= Administrative divisions of Smolensk Oblast =

Smolensk Oblast Смоленская область (Russian)
- Oblast
- Flag Coat of arms

- Coordinates: 55°00′N 33°00′E
- Country: Russia
- Federal district: Central
- Economic region: Central
- Established: September 27, 1937
- Administrative center: Smolensk

Government
  - Body: Oblast Duma
  - Governor: Vasily Anokhin

Area
  - Total: 49,779 km^{2} (19,220 sq mi)
  - Rank: 53rd

Population (2021 census)
  - Total: 888,421
  - Estimate (January 2014): 967,900
  - Rank: 57th
  - Density: 17.847/km^{2} (46.224/sq mi)
  - Urban: 72.6%
  - Rural: 27.4%
- Time zone: UTC+
- ISO 3166 code: RU-SMO
- License plates: 67
- Official languages: Russian
- Website: admin-smolensk.ru

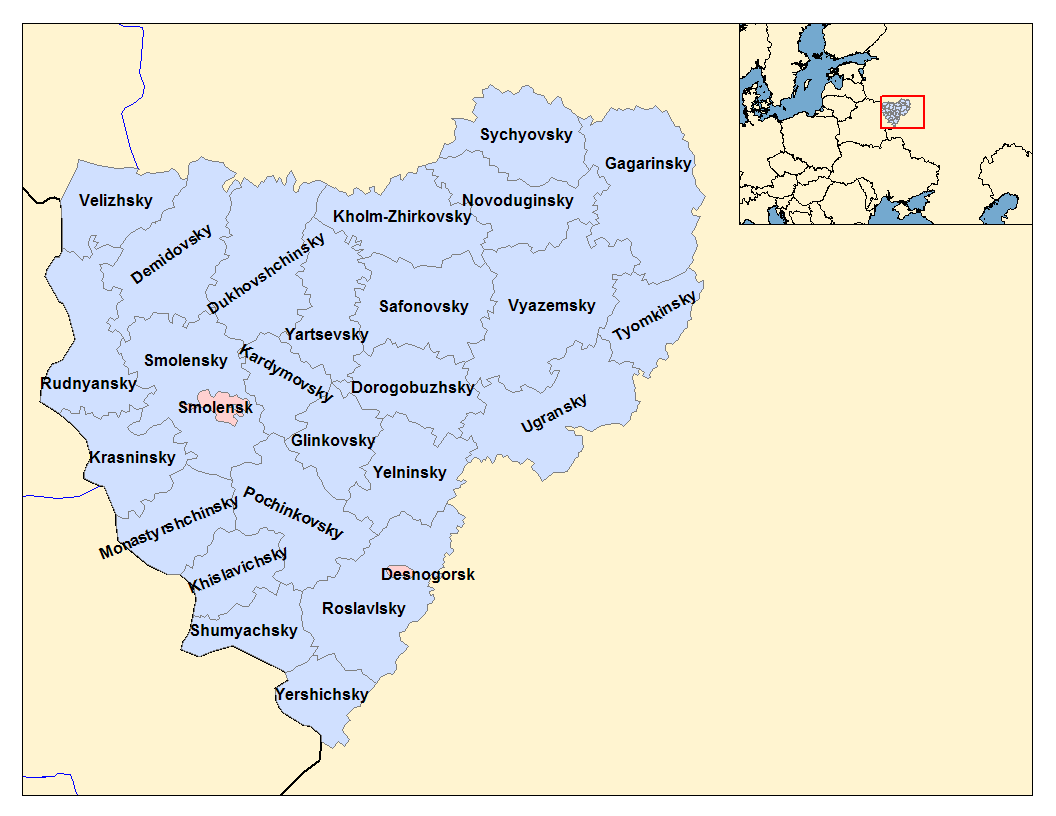
Administrative divisions of Smolensk Oblast

Administrative divisions of Kostroma Oblast lists all of the various administrative divisions that comprise Smolensk Oblast in western Russia on nation's border with Belarus.

== List ==
- Cities and towns under the oblast's jurisdiction:
  - Smolensk (Смоленск) (administrative center)
    - city districts:
      - Leninsky (Ленинский)
      - Promyshlenny (Промышленный)
      - Zadneprovsky (Заднепровский)
  - Desnogorsk (Десногорск)
- Districts:
  - Demidovsky (Демидовский)
    - Towns under the district's jurisdiction:
      - Demidov (Демидов)
    - Urban-type settlements under the district's jurisdiction:
      - Przhevalskoye resort settlement (Пржевальское)
    - with 16 rural okrugs under the district's jurisdiction.
  - Dorogobuzhsky (Дорогобужский)
    - Towns under the district's jurisdiction:
      - Dorogobuzh (Дорогобуж)
    - Urban-type settlements under the district's jurisdiction:
      - Verkhnedneprovsky (Верхнеднепровский)
    - with 12 rural okrugs under the district's jurisdiction.
  - Dukhovshchinsky (Духовщинский)
    - Towns under the district's jurisdiction:
      - Dukhovshchina (Духовщина)
    - Urban-type settlements under the district's jurisdiction:
      - Ozyorny (Озёрный)
    - with 6 rural okrugs under the district's jurisdiction.
  - Gagarinsky (Гагаринский)
    - Towns under the district's jurisdiction:
      - Gagarin (Гагарин)
    - with 15 rural okrugs under the district's jurisdiction.
  - Glinkovsky (Глинковский)
    - with 6 rural okrugs under the district's jurisdiction.
  - Kardymovsky (Кардымовский)
    - Urban-type settlements under the district's jurisdiction:
      - Kardymovo (Кардымово)
    - with 8 rural okrugs under the district's jurisdiction.
  - Khislavichsky (Хиславичский)
    - Urban-type settlements under the district's jurisdiction:
      - Khislavichi (Хиславичи)
    - with 11 rural okrugs under the district's jurisdiction.
  - Kholm-Zhirkovsky (Холм-Жирковский)
    - Urban-type settlements under the district's jurisdiction:
      - Kholm-Zhirkovsky (Холм-Жирковский)
    - with 15 rural okrugs under the district's jurisdiction.
  - Krasninsky (Краснинский)
    - Urban-type settlements under the district's jurisdiction:
      - Krasny (Красный)
    - with 12 rural okrugs under the district's jurisdiction.
  - Monastyrshchinsky (Монастырщинский)
    - Urban-type settlements under the district's jurisdiction:
      - Monastyrshchina (Монастырщина)
    - with 9 rural okrugs under the district's jurisdiction.
  - Novoduginsky (Новодугинский)
    - with 6 rural okrugs under the district's jurisdiction.
  - Pochinkovsky (Починковский)
    - Towns under the district's jurisdiction:
      - Pochinok (Починок)
    - with 16 rural okrugs under the district's jurisdiction.
  - Roslavlsky (Рославльский)
    - Towns under the district's jurisdiction:
      - Roslavl (Рославль)
    - with 21 rural okrugs under the district's jurisdiction.
  - Rudnyansky (Руднянский)
    - Towns under the district's jurisdiction:
      - Rudnya (Рудня)
    - Urban-type settlements under the district's jurisdiction:
      - Golynki (Голынки)
    - with 8 rural okrugs under the district's jurisdiction.
  - Safonovsky (Сафоновский)
    - Towns under the district's jurisdiction:
      - Safonovo (Сафоново)
    - Urban-type settlements under the district's jurisdiction:
      - Izdeshkovo (Издешково)
    - with 16 rural okrugs under the district's jurisdiction.
  - Shumyachsky (Шумячский)
    - Urban-type settlements under the district's jurisdiction:
      - Shumyachi (Шумячи)
    - with 7 rural okrugs under the district's jurisdiction.
  - Smolensky (Смоленский)
    - with 19 rural okrugs under the district's jurisdiction.
  - Sychyovsky (Сычёвский)
    - Towns under the district's jurisdiction:
      - Sychyovka (Сычёвка)
    - with 11 rural okrugs under the district's jurisdiction.
  - Tyomkinsky (Тёмкинский)
    - with 10 rural okrugs under the district's jurisdiction.
  - Ugransky (Угранский)
    - Urban-type settlements under the district's jurisdiction:
      - Ugra (Угра)
    - with 16 rural okrugs under the district's jurisdiction.
  - Velizhsky (Велижский)
    - Towns under the district's jurisdiction:
      - Velizh (Велиж)
    - with 9 rural okrugs under the district's jurisdiction.
  - Vyazemsky (Вяземский)
    - Towns under the district's jurisdiction:
      - Vyazma (Вязьма)
    - with 22 rural okrugs under the district's jurisdiction.
  - Yartsevsky (Ярцевский)
    - Towns under the district's jurisdiction:
      - Yartsevo (Ярцево)
    - with 11 rural okrugs under the district's jurisdiction.
  - Yelninsky (Ельнинский)
    - Towns under the district's jurisdiction:
      - Yelnya (Ельня)
    - with 11 rural okrugs under the district's jurisdiction.
  - Yershichsky (Ершичский)
    - with 9 rural okrugs under the district's jurisdiction.

== Summary table ==
Smolensk Oblast, Russia
Administrative center: Smolensk
As of 2013:
Number of districts (районы)	25
Number of cities/towns (города)	15
Number of urban-type settlements (посёлки городского типа)	12
Number of rural okrugs (сельские округа)	302
As of 2002:
Number of rural localities (сельские населённые пункты)	4,894
Number of uninhabited rural localities (сельские населённые пункты без населения)	488
