= Monastyrshchinsky District =

Monastyrshchinsky District Монастырщинский район (Russian)
- District
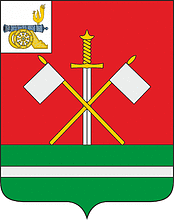
- Flag Coat of arms
- Location of Monastyrshchinsky District in Smolensk Oblast
- Coordinates: 54°21′N 31°50′E
- Country: Russia
- Federal subject: Smolensk Oblast
- Established: 1 October 1929
- Administrative center: Monastyrshchina

Area
  - Total: 1,513.75 km^{2} (584.46 sq mi)

Population (2010 Census)
  - Total: 10,788
  - Density: 7.1267/km^{2} (18.458/sq mi)
  - Urban: 37.7%
  - Rural: 62.3%

Administrative structure
  - Administrative divisions: 1 Urban settlements, 9 Rural settlements
  - Inhabited localities: 1 urban-type settlements, 202 rural localities

Municipal structure
  - Municipally incorporated as: Monastyrshchinsky Municipal District
  - Municipal divisions: 1 urban settlements, 6 rural settlements
- Time zone: UTC+3 (MSK)
- OKTMO ID: 66627000
- Website: http://monast.admin-smolensk.ru

Monastyrshchinsky District (Russian: Монасты́рщинский райо́н) is an administrative and municipal district (raion), one of the twenty-five in Smolensk Oblast, Russia. It is located in the west of the oblast and borders with Smolensky District in the north, Pochinkovsky District in the east, Khislavichsky District in the south, Mstsislaw District of Mogilev Region of Belarus in the west, and with Krasninsky District in the northwest. The area of the district is 1,513.75 square kilometers (584.46 sq mi). Its administrative center is the urban locality (a settlement) of Monastyrshchina. Population: 10,788 (2010 Census); 13,876 (2002 census); 17,559 (1989 Soviet census). The population of Monastyrshchino accounts for 37.7% of the district's total population.

== Geography ==
The whole area of the district belongs to the drainage basin of the Sozh River, a tributary of the Dnieper. The principal river of the district, the Vikhra River, a right tributary of the Sozh, crosses the district from northeast to southwest and then crosses into Belarus. The settlement of Monastyrshchina is located on the left bank of the Vikhra. The rivers in the northern, central, and western parts of the district flow into the Vikhra, whereas those in the eastern and the southern parts belong to the drainage basins of other right tributaries of the Sozh.

== History ==
Between second half of the 14th century and the middle of the 17th century, the area belonged intermittently to the Grand Duchy of Lithuania, to Poland, and to the Grand Duchy of Moscow. In the 18th century, much of the area belonged to Poland, and in 1772, as a result of the First Partition of Poland, it was transferred to Russia and included in the newly established Mogilev Governorate. It belonged to Mstislavsky Uyezd. In 1919, Mogilev Governorate was abolished, and Mstitlavl Uyezd was transferred to Smolensk Governorate. On 3 March 1924, a half of Mstislavsky Uyezd was transferred to Byelorussian Soviet Socialist Republic, and seven volosts were left in Smolensk Governorate. In 1925, Monastyrshchina Volost was established.

The northern part of the district remained in Russia after the 17th century, and in the course of the administrative reform carried out in 1708 by Peter the Great, it was included into Smolensk Governorate and remained there until 1929, with the exception of the brief period between 1775 and 1796, when Smolensk Governorate was transformed into Smolensk Viceroyalty. The area belonged to Krasninsky Uyezd, which was established in 1775.

On 12 July 1929, governorates and uyezds were abolished, and Monastyrshchinsky District with the administrative center in the selo of Monastyrshchina was established. The district belonged to Smolensk Okrug of Western Oblast. On August 1, 1930, the okrugs were abolished, and the districts were subordinated directly to the oblast. On 27 September 1937 Western Oblast was abolished and split between Oryol and Smolensk Oblasts. Monastyrshchinsky District was transferred to Smolensk Oblast. Between 1941 and 1943, during WWII, the district was occupied by German troops. In January 1965, Monastyrshchina was granted urban-type settlement status.

In 1963, during the abortive Khrushchyov administrative reform, Khislavichsky District was merged into Monastyrshchinsky District. In 1965, it was re-established.

== Economy ==
=== Industry ===
There is a cheese production factory, located in Monastyrshchina.

=== Agriculture ===
There are 20 large- and mid-size farms in the district.

=== Transportation ===
The closest railway station is in Pochinok, on the railway connecting Smolensk and Bryansk via Roslavl.

Monastyrshchina is connected by paved roads with Smolensk, Pochinok, and Khislavichi, and has access to the M1 highway, connecting Moscow with Belarus via Smolensk. A road of a poor quality connects Monastyrshchina with Mstsislaw across the border with Belarus. There are local roads as well, with bus traffic originating from Monastyrshchina.

The Vikhra is not navigable.

== Culture and recreation ==
The Sts. Peter and Paul Church in Monastyrshchina was built in 1906. There is a local museum in Monastyrshchina.
