= Khislavichsky District =

Khislavichsky District Хиславичский район (Russian)
- District
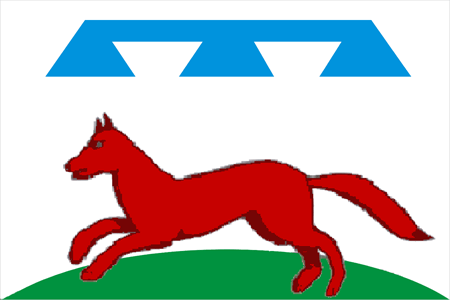
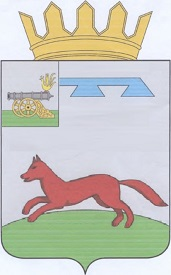
- Flag Coat of arms
- Location of Khislavichsky District in Smolensk Oblast
- Coordinates: 54°11′N 32°09′E
- Country: Russia
- Federal subject: Smolensk Oblast
- Established: 1 October 1929
- Administrative center: Khislavichi

Area
  - Total: 1,161.00 km^{2} (448.26 sq mi)

Population (2010 Census)
  - Total: 9,070
  - Density: 7.81/km^{2} (20.2/sq mi)
  - Urban: 45.6%
  - Rural: 54.4%

Administrative structure
  - Administrative divisions: 1 Urban settlements, 11 Rural settlements
  - Inhabited localities: 1 urban-type settlements, 148 rural localities

Municipal structure
  - Municipally incorporated as: Khislavichsky Municipal District
  - Municipal divisions: 1 urban settlements, 11 rural settlements
- Time zone: UTC+3 (MSK)
- OKTMO ID: 66652000
- Website: http://hislav.admin-smolensk.ru/

Khislavichsky District (Russian: Хиславичский райо́н) is an administrative and municipal district (raion), one of the twenty-five in Smolensk Oblast, Russia. It is located in the southwest of the oblast and borders with Monastyrshchinsky District in the north, Pochinkovsky District in the east, Shumyachsky District in the south, and with Mstsislaw District of Mogilev Region of Belarus in the west. The area of the district is 1,161 square kilometers (448 sq mi). Its administrative center is the urban locality (an urban-type settlement) of Khislavichi. Population: 9,070 (2010 Census); 12,007 (2002 census); 15,071 (1989 Soviet census). The population of Khislavichi accounts for 45.6% of the district's total population.

== Geography ==
The whole area of the district belongs to the drainage basin of the Sozh River, a major right tributary of the Dnieper. The Sozh crosses the district from the north to the southwest, crossing into Belarus. The principal tributaries of the Sozh within the district are the Berezina River (left) and the Lyza River (right). Most of the area of the district is flat, and in the northwest the outskirts of the Smolensk Upland dominate the landscape.

== History ==
Since the 12th century, the area belonged to the Principality of Smolensk, and since the end of the 12th century — to its vassal state, the Principality of Mstislavl. Until 1359, it belonged intermittently to the Grand Duchy of Lithuania and to Smolensk lands. After 1359, together with the whole Principality of Mstislavl, it became part of the Grand Duchy of Lithuania, and subsequently of Poland. The Principality of Mstislavl was abolished in 1483, and Khislavichi is first mentioned in 1526. In 1772, as a result of the First Partition of Poland, the area was transferred to Russia and included in the newly established Mogilev Governorate. It belonged to Mstislavsky Uyezd. In 1919, Mogilev Governorate was abolished, and Mstislavsky Uyezd was transferred to Smolensk Governorate. On 3 March 1924, a half of Mstislavsky Uyezd was transferred to Byelorussian Soviet Socialist Republic, and seven volosts, including Khislavichi, were left in Smolensk Governorate.

On 12 July 1929, governorates and uyezds were abolished, and Khislavichsky District with the administrative center in the settlement of Khislavichi was established. The district belonged to Roslavl Okrug of Western Oblast. On August 1, 1930, the okrugs were abolished, and the districts were subordinated directly to the oblast. In 1935, Khislavichi was granted urban-type settlement status. On 27 September 1937 Western Oblast was abolished and split between Oryol and Smolensk Oblasts. Khislavichsky District was transferred to Smolensk Oblast. Between July 1941 and September 1943, during WWII, the district was occupied by German troops.

In 1963, during the abortive Khrushchyov administrative reform, Khislavichsky District was merged into Monastyrshchinsky District. In 1965, it was re-established.

== Economy ==
=== Agriculture ===
There are 19 farms in the district. The main agricultural specializations are cattle breeding as well as growing of crops and vegetables.

=== Transportation ===
Khislavichi is on a main road which connects Pochinok with Mstsislaw, where it continues to Orsha and Krychaw. The road crosses into Belarus west of the village of Oktyabrskoye. In Khislavichi, a road branches northwest to Monastyrshchina. There are also local roads with bus traffic originating from Khislavichi.

The closest railway station is in Pochinok.

The Sozh is not navigable within the district.

== Culture and recreation ==
There are 13 archaeological monuments and 10 cultural monuments in the district, all protected at the local level.

In Khislavichi, there is a local museum.
