= Yartsevsky =

Yartsevsky (masculine), Yartsevskaya (feminine), or Yartsevskoye (neuter) may refer to:

- Yartsevsky District, a district of Smolensk Oblast, Russia
- Yartsevskoye Urban Settlement, an administrative division and a municipal formation which the town of Yartsevo and three rural localities in Yartsevsky District of Smolensk Oblast, Russia are incorporated as
