= Kardymovsky District =

Kardymovsky District Кардымовский район (Russian)
- District
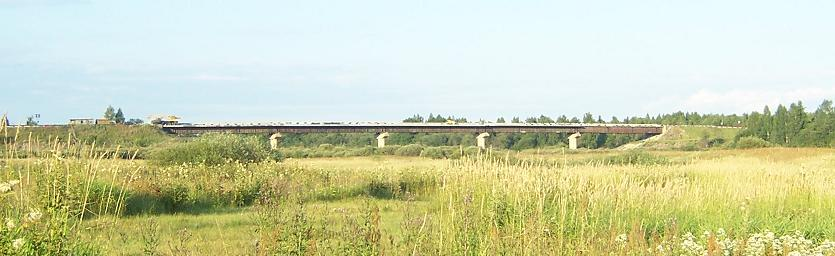
- A bridge over the Dnieper near the village of Solovyovo in Kardymovsky District

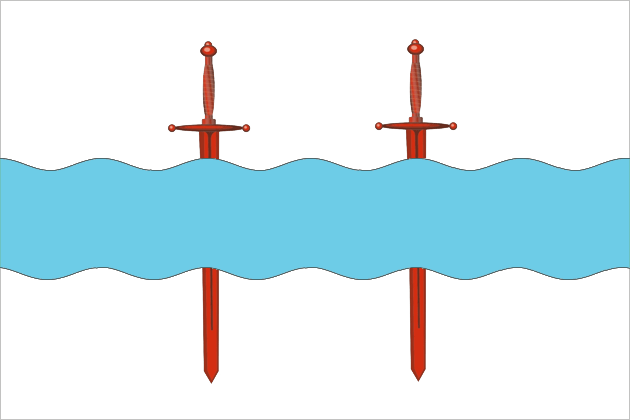
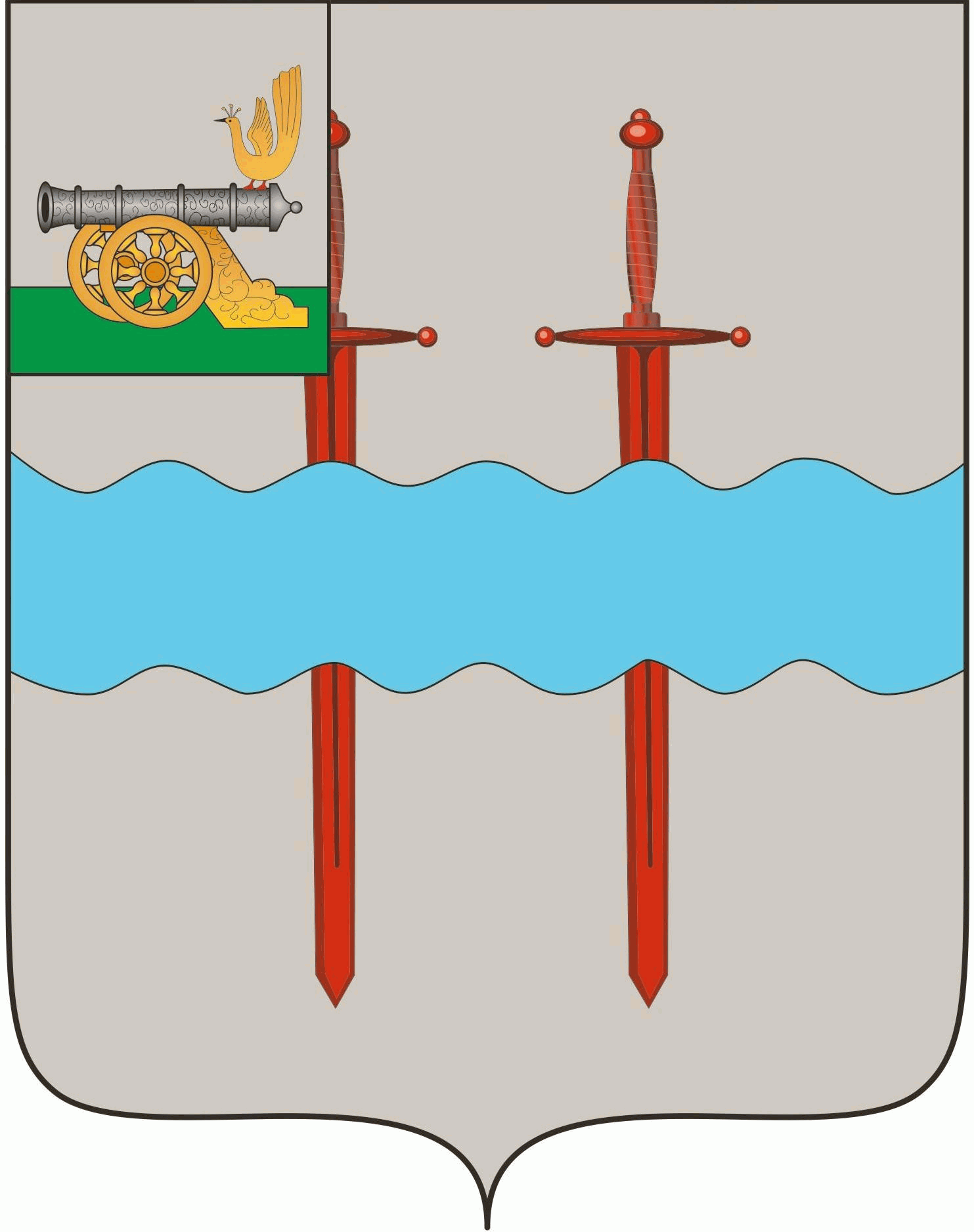
- Flag Coat of arms
- Location of Kardymovsky District in Smolensk Oblast
- Coordinates: 54°52′48″N 32°26′42″E
- Country: Russia
- Federal subject: Smolensk Oblast
- Established: 1 October 1929
- Administrative center: Kardymovo

Area
  - Total: 1,093.15 km^{2} (422.07 sq mi)

Population (2010 Census)
  - Total: 11,852
  - Density: 10.842/km^{2} (28.081/sq mi)
  - Urban: 39.3%
  - Rural: 60.7%

Administrative structure
  - Administrative divisions: 1 Urban settlements, 8 Rural settlements
  - Inhabited localities: 1 urban-type settlements, 159 rural localities

Municipal structure
  - Municipally incorporated as: Kardymovsky Municipal District
  - Municipal divisions: 1 urban settlements, 8 rural settlements
- Time zone: UTC+3 (MSK)
- OKTMO ID: 66623000
- Website: http://kardymovo.ru/

Kardymovsky District (Russian: Карды́мовский райо́н) is an administrative and municipal district (raion), one of the twenty-five in Smolensk Oblast, Russia. It is located in the center of the oblast and borders with Dukhovshchinsky District in the north, Yartsevsky District in the northeast, Dorogobuzhsky District in the east, Glinkovsky District in the southeast, Pochinkovsky District in the south, and with Smolensky District in the west. The area of the district is 1,093.15 square kilometers (422.07 sq mi). Its administrative center is the urban locality (a settlement) of Kardymovo. Population: 11,852 (2010 Census); 12,521 (2002 census); 13,505 (1989 Soviet census). The population of Kardymovo accounts for 39.3% of the district's total population.

== Geography ==
The rivers in the whole area of the district belong to the drainage basin of the Dnieper. The Dnieper itself crosses the area of the district in the east and in the south, and flows on the eastern, southern, and western border of the district. The biggest (right) tributaries of the Dnieper inside the district are the Khmost, which crosses the district from the north to the south, and the Orleya, which is fully within the district. 23.8% of the area of the district is covered by forest.

== History ==
The area in the Middle Ages belonged intermittently to the Principality of Smolensk, the Grand Duchy of Lithuania, the Grand Duchy of Moscow, and Poland. In the course of the administrative reform carried out in 1708 by Peter the Great, the area was included into Smolensk Governorate and remained there until 1929, with the exception of the brief periods between 1713 and 1726, when it belonged to Riga Governorate, and between 1775 and 1796, when Smolensk Governorate was transformed into Smolensk Viceroyalty. It was split between Smolensky, Dorogobuzhsky, and Dukhovshchinsky Uyezds.

On 12 July 1929, governorates and uyezds were abolished, and Kardymovsky District with the administrative center in the selo of Kardymovo was established on the territories which previously belonged to Smolensky, Dorogobuzhsky, and Dukhovshchinsky Uyezds. The district belonged to Smolensk Okrug of Western Oblast. On August 1, 1930 the okrugs were abolished, and the districts were subordinated directly to the oblast. On 20 November 1930 Kardymovsky District was abolished and merged into Smolensky District. On 18 January 1935 Kardymovsky District was re-established. On 27 September 1937 Western Oblast was abolished and split between Oryol and Smolensk Oblasts. Kardymovsky District was transferred to Smolensk Oblast. Between 1941 and September 1943, during WWII, the district was occupied by German troops. On 1 February 1963, Kardymovsky District was merged into Smolensky and Yartsevsky Districts, but on 23 March 1977 it was re-established. In 1979, Kardymovo was made an urban-type settlement.

== Economy ==
=== Human resources ===
In 2019, the unemployment level in the district was 2.27%. The average salary was 21,600 rubles per month, which was 73.5% of the mean salary in Smolensk Oblast.

=== Industry ===
There are enterprises of food industry of the district, as well as plastic, rubber, and equipment production.

=== Agriculture ===
The main agricultural specialization of the district is cattle breeding with milk and meat production, as well as growing of potato, crops, and vegetables.

=== Transportation ===
The railway connecting Moscow and Smolensk crosses the district from east to west. The main railway station is in Kardymovo, a few trains stop there.

The M1 highway connecting Moscow with the state border between Russia and Belarus crosses the northern part of the district from east to west. In Kamenka, a road to Dukhovshchina, Bely, and Nelidovo branches off north. Another road, connecting Dorogobuzh and Smolensk, traversed the district from east to west, passing through Kardymovo. The R120 highway, here a part of the bypass of Smolensk, crosses the western part of the district. There are local roads as well, with bus traffic originating from Kardymovo.

The Dnieper is navigable within the district, however, there is no organized navigation.

== Culture and recreation ==
There is a local museum in Kardymovo.

As of 2018, the district has 41 objects designated as cultural heritage. These include historical churches in the villages of Shestakovo and Yarovnya.
