= Golynki =

Golynki Голынки
- Work settlement
- Interactive map of Golynki
- Location of Golynki Golynki (Smolensk Oblast)
- Coordinates: 54°51′54″N 31°22′54″E
- Country: Russia
- Federal subject: Smolensk Oblast
- Administrative district: Rudnyansky District
- Urban settlementSelsoviet: Golynkovskoye
- Founded: 1908
- Urban-type settlement status since: 1963

Population (2010 Census)
  - Total: 2,834
  - Estimate (2024): 2,856 (+0.8%)

Administrative status
  - Capital of: Rudnyansky District, Golynkovskoye Urban Settlement

Municipal status
  - Municipal district: Rudnyansky Municipal District
  - Urban settlement: Golynkovskoye Urban Settlement
  - Capital of: Rudnyansky Municipal District, Golynkovskoye Urban Settlement
- Time zone: UTC+3 (MSK)
- Postal code: 216740
- OKTMO ID: 66638153051

Golynki (Russian: Голынки) is an urban-type settlement in Rudnyansky District of Smolensk Oblast, Russia. It is located on the banks of the Yelenka River. Population: 3,573 (2010 census); 3,884 (2002 census); 4,607 (1989 Soviet census).

== History ==
Golymki is known as a settlement since 1908, when it was made by a merger of five villages. The names of the four of them were Golynki, Glinyany, Skorokhody, and Ukhabnoye; the name of the fifth village is unknown. The settlement belonged to Orshansky Uyezd of Mogilev Governorate. In 1919, Mogilev Governorate was abolished, and Orshansky Uyezd was included into Gomel Governorate. In 1920, the uyezd was included into Vitebsk Governorate, and shortly the area was transferred to Smolensky Uyezd of Smolensk Governorate.

On 12 July 1929, governorates and uyezds were abolished, and Rudnyansky District with the administrative center in Rudnya was established. The district belonged to Smolensk Okrug of Western Oblast. On August 1, 1930, the okrugs were abolished, and the districts were subordinated directly to the oblast. On 27 September 1937 Western Oblast was abolished and split between Oryol and Smolensk Oblasts. Rudnyansky District was transferred to Smolensk Oblast. Between 1941 and September 1943, during WWII, the district was occupied by German troops. In 1963, Golynki was granted the urban-type settlement status, and the population started to steadily increase due to the construction of the thermometer production plant.

== Climate ==
Golynki has a warm-summer humid continental climate (Dfb in the Köppen climate classification).

Climate data for Golynki
| Month | Jan | Feb | Mar | Apr | May | Jun | Jul | Aug | Sep | Oct | Nov | Dec | Year |
|---|---|---|---|---|---|---|---|---|---|---|---|---|---|
| Mean daily maximum °C (°F) | −4.1 (24.6) | −3.2 (26.2) | 2.3 (36.1) | 11.1 (52.0) | 17.3 (63.1) | 20.5 (68.9) | 22.9 (73.2) | 21.6 (70.9) | 15.9 (60.6) | 8.7 (47.7) | 2.7 (36.9) | −1.3 (29.7) | 9.5 (49.2) |
| Daily mean °C (°F) | −6.1 (21.0) | −5.7 (21.7) | −1.0 (30.2) | 6.7 (44.1) | 13.0 (55.4) | 16.7 (62.1) | 19.1 (66.4) | 17.8 (64.0) | 12.4 (54.3) | 6.1 (43.0) | 0.9 (33.6) | −3.1 (26.4) | 6.4 (43.5) |
| Mean daily minimum °C (°F) | −8.5 (16.7) | −8.7 (16.3) | −4.8 (23.4) | 1.6 (34.9) | 7.9 (46.2) | 11.9 (53.4) | 14.6 (58.3) | 13.6 (56.5) | 8.7 (47.7) | 3.5 (38.3) | −0.9 (30.4) | −5.0 (23.0) | 2.8 (37.1) |
| Average precipitation mm (inches) | 53 (2.1) | 47 (1.9) | 45 (1.8) | 46 (1.8) | 74 (2.9) | 83 (3.3) | 96 (3.8) | 80 (3.1) | 64 (2.5) | 67 (2.6) | 57 (2.2) | 50 (2.0) | 762 (30) |
Source: https://en.climate-data.org/asia/russian-federation/smolensk-oblast/golynki-57396/

== Economy ==
=== Industry ===
The economy of Golynki is based on the plant producing thermometers. There was also a peat production plant.

=== Transportation ===
The railway connecting Smolensk with Vitebsk via Rudnya passes Golynki.

The R120 highway connecting Smolensk via Rudnya with the state border between Russia and Belarus, and continuing across the border to Vitebsk, makes the southern border of Golynki.
