= Smolensky District, Smolensk Oblast =

Smolensky District Смоленский район (Russian)
- District
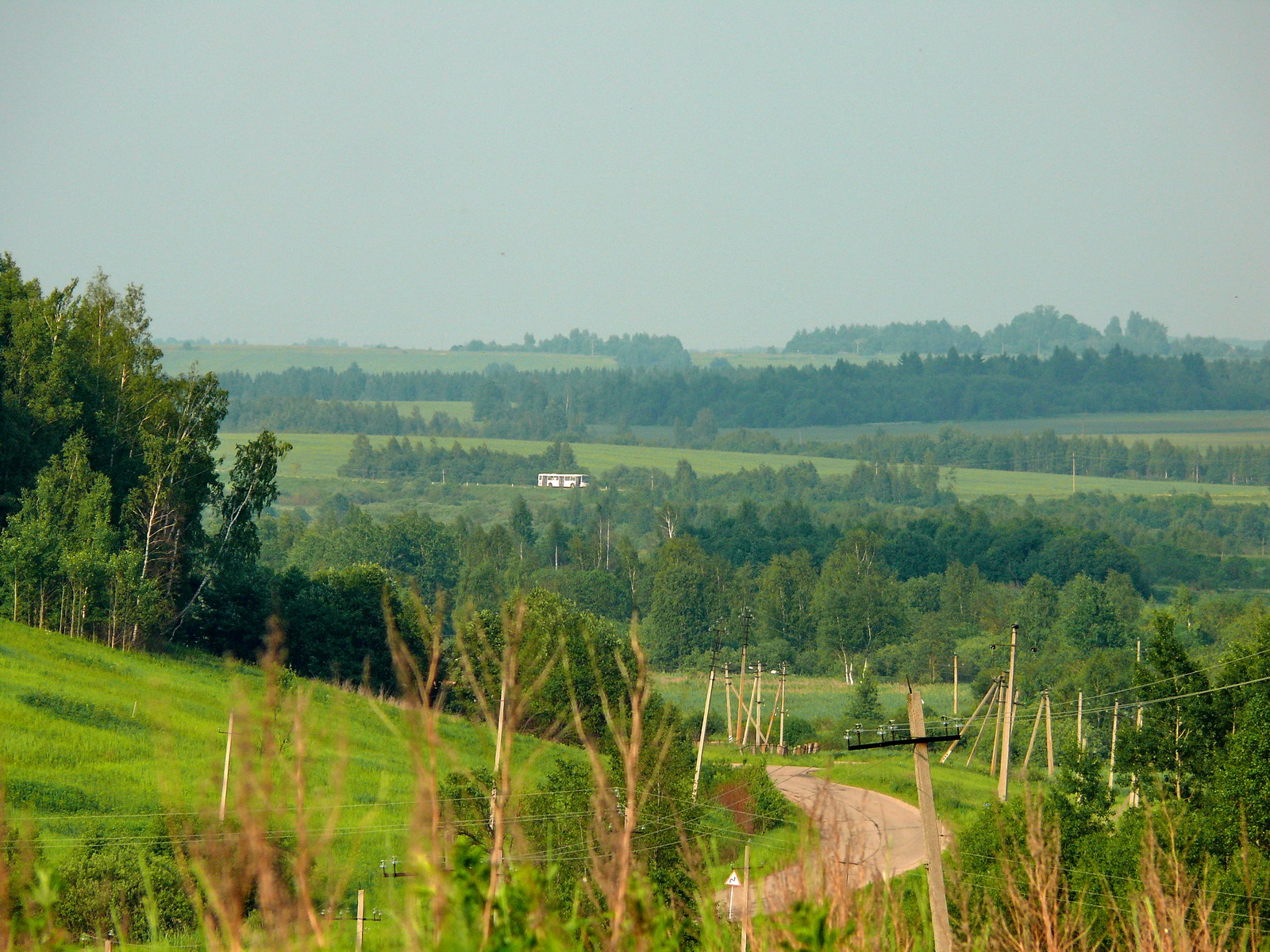
- Landscape in Smolensky District

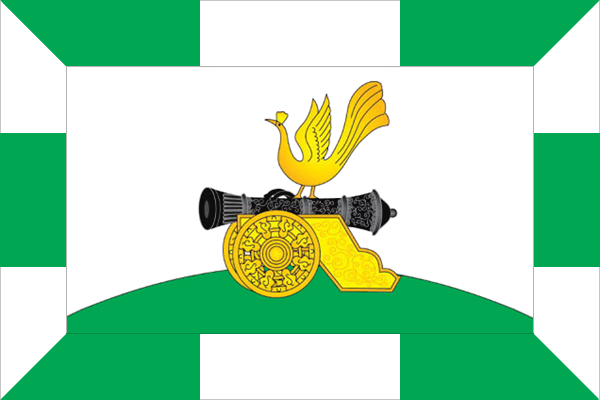
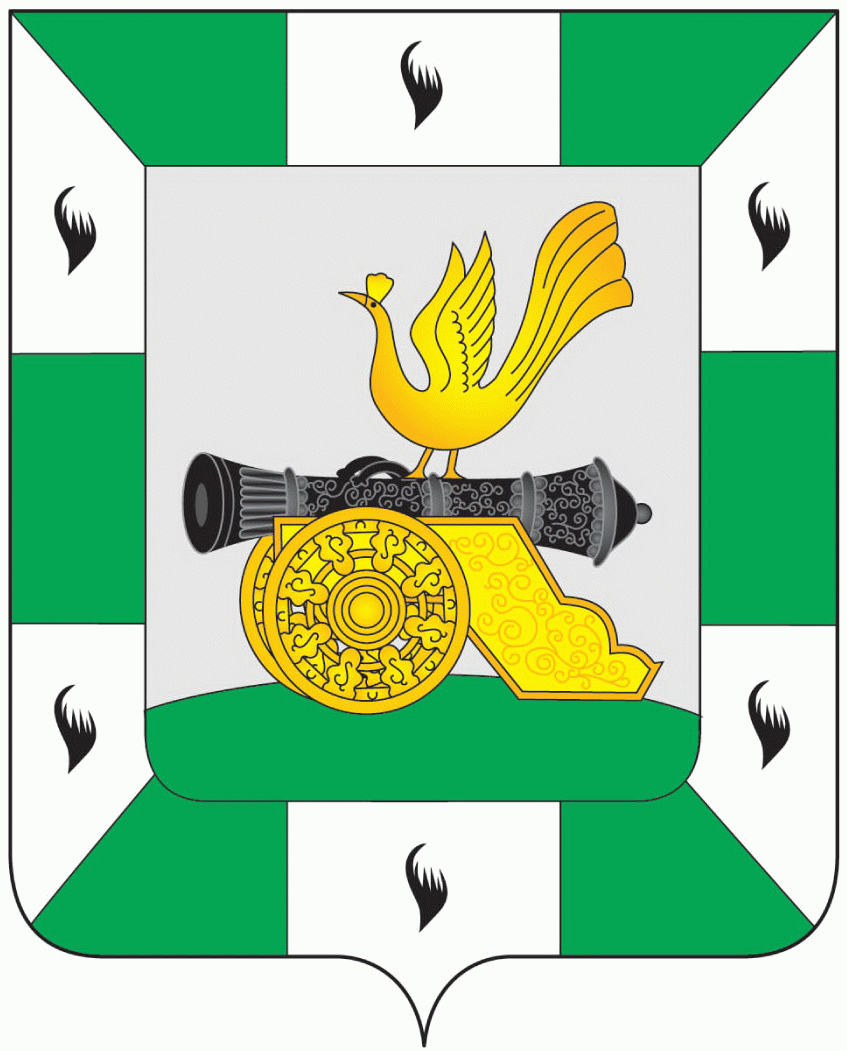
- Flag Coat of arms
- Location of Smolensky District in Smolensk Oblast
- Coordinates: 54°47′N 32°03′E
- Country: Russia
- Federal subject: Smolensk Oblast
- Established: 1930
- Administrative center: Smolensk

Area
  - Total: 2,494.98 km^{2} (963.32 sq mi)

Population (2010 Census)
  - Total: 44,964
  - Density: 18.022/km^{2} (46.676/sq mi)
  - Urban: 0%
  - Rural: 100%

Administrative structure
  - Administrative divisions: 19 Rural settlements
  - Inhabited localities: 420 rural localities

Municipal structure
  - Municipally incorporated as: Smolensky Municipal District
  - Municipal divisions: 0 urban settlements, 19 rural settlements
- Time zone: UTC+3 (MSK)
- OKTMO ID: 66544000
- Website: http://www.smol-ray.ru/

Smolensky District (Russian: Смоле́нский райо́н) is an administrative and municipal district (raion), one of the twenty-five in Smolensk Oblast, Russia. It is located in the west of the oblast and borders with Demidovsky District in the north, Dukhovshchinsky District in the northeast, Kardymovsky District in the east, Pochinkovsky District in the south, Monastyrshchinsky District in the southwest, Krasninsky District in the west, and with Rudnyansky District in the northwest. The area of the district is 2,494.98 square kilometers (963.32 sq mi). Its administrative center is the city of Smolensk (which is not administratively a part of the district). Population: 44,964 (2010 Census); 47,281 (2002 census); 50,620 (1989 Soviet census).

== Geography ==
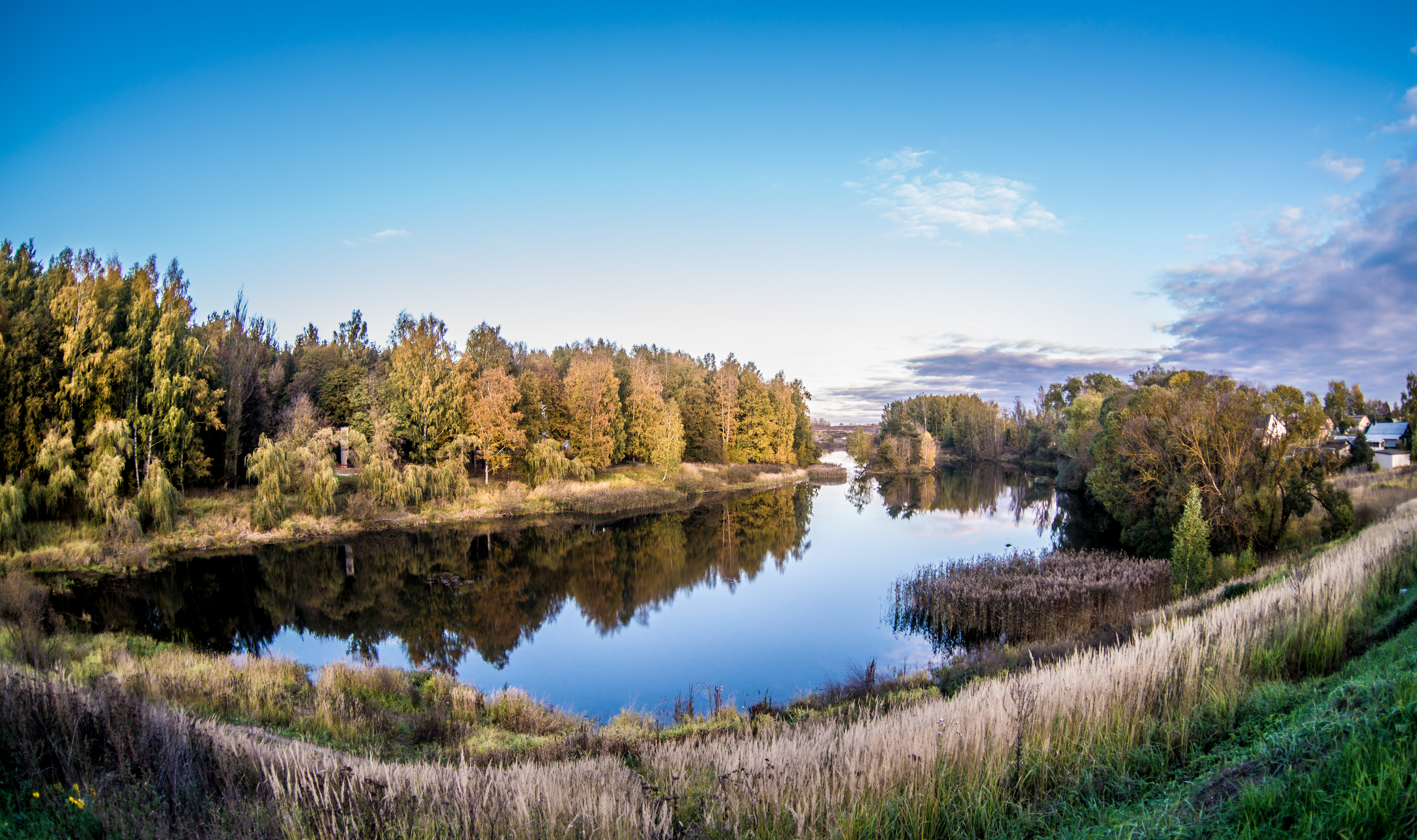
A lake by the village of Nagat.

The district is split between the drainage basins of the Dnieper and the Daugava. The rivers in the northern part of the district flow into the Kasplya River, a left tributary of the Daugava. The Kasplya has its source in the district. The Dnieper crosses the district from east to west. The southern part of the district belongs to the drainage basin of the Sozh River, a major left tributary of the Dnieper.

== History ==
The area was continuously populated since prehistory due to the trading route along the Dnieper. Since the 9th century, it was always attached to the city of Smolensk. The first settlement in the area, the selo of Dresna, was mentioned in chronicles under 1136; the selo of Kasplya was mentioned under 1150. In 1580, after the Livonian War, the area was transferred to Poland. In 1667, according to the Truce of Andrusovo, it was transferred back to Russia.

In the course of the administrative reform carried out in 1708 by Peter the Great, the area was included into Smolensk Governorate and remained there until 1929, with the exception of the brief period between 1775 and 1796, when Smolensk Governorate was transformed into Smolensk Viceroyalty. The area was split between Dukhovshchinsky, Krasninsky, Porechsky, and Smolensky Uyezds.

On 12 July 1929, governorates and uyezds were abolished, and three districts were established in the area: Grinyovsky, Kardymovsky, and Katynsky Districts. All three district had their administrative center in the city of Smolensk and belonged to Smolensk Okrug of Western Oblast. On August 1, 1930 the okrugs were abolished, and the districts were subordinated directly to the oblast. In 1930 these three districts were merged into newly established Smolensky District with the administrative center in Smolensk. On 27 September 1937 Western Oblast was abolished and split between Oryol and Smolensk Oblasts. Smolensky District was transferred to Smolensk Oblast. Between 1941 and 1943, during WWII, the district was occupied by German troops.

Kardymovsky District was restored in 1935 and abolished again in 1963, during the abortive Khrushchyov administrative reform, and split between Smolensky and Yartsevsky Districts. In 1977, it was re-established. Similarly, in 1963 Krasninsky District was abolished and merged into Smolensky District. It was re-established in 1965.

On 12 July 1929, Kasplyansky District with the administrative center in the selo of Kasplya was established. It belonged to Smolensk Okrug of Western Oblast. In 1932 it was abolished and split between Demidovsky, Dukhovshchinsky, Rudnyandky, and Smolensky Districts. In 1938, Kasplyansky District was re-established, and in 1961, it was abolished again and merged into Smolensky District.

== Administrative and municipal status ==
Within the framework of administrative divisions, Smolensky District is one of the twenty-five in the oblast. The city of Smolensk serves as its administrative center, despite being incorporated separately as an urban okrug—an administrative unit with the status equal to that of the districts.

As a municipal division, the district is incorporated as Smolensky Municipal District. Smolensk Urban Okrug is incorporated separately from the district

== Economy ==
=== Industry ===
There are no big industrial enterprises in the district. Small enterprises are involved into food and construction industries.

=== Agriculture ===
The main agricultural specializations in the district are cattle breeding with meat and milk production; production of pork, poultry, and eggs, and crops growing.

=== Transportation ===
The city of Smolensk is fully surrounded by Smolensky District, and all communications to Smolensk run through the district.

The railway connecting Moscow and Minsk runs through the district passing Smolensk. In Smolensk, another railway to Vitebsk and further with Daugavpils via Rudnya branches off north-west. East of Smolensk, two more railway lines branch off: One runs south to Bryansk via Roslavl, and another one runs north to Prechistoye. The railway line to Prechistoye does not have passenger traffic, all other lines do.

The M1 highway connecting Moscow with the state border between Russia and Belarus crosses the district from east to west bypassing Smolensk from the north. The R133 highway to Demidov, Velizh, and Nevel branches off north in Olsha. The R120 highway continues north to Rudnya and further across the border to Vitebsk, and south to Roslavl and Bryansk. The R135 highway runs from Smolensk to the southwest to Krasny and continues across the border to Orsha.

The Dnieper is navigable within the district, however, there is no organized navigation.

== Culture and recreation ==
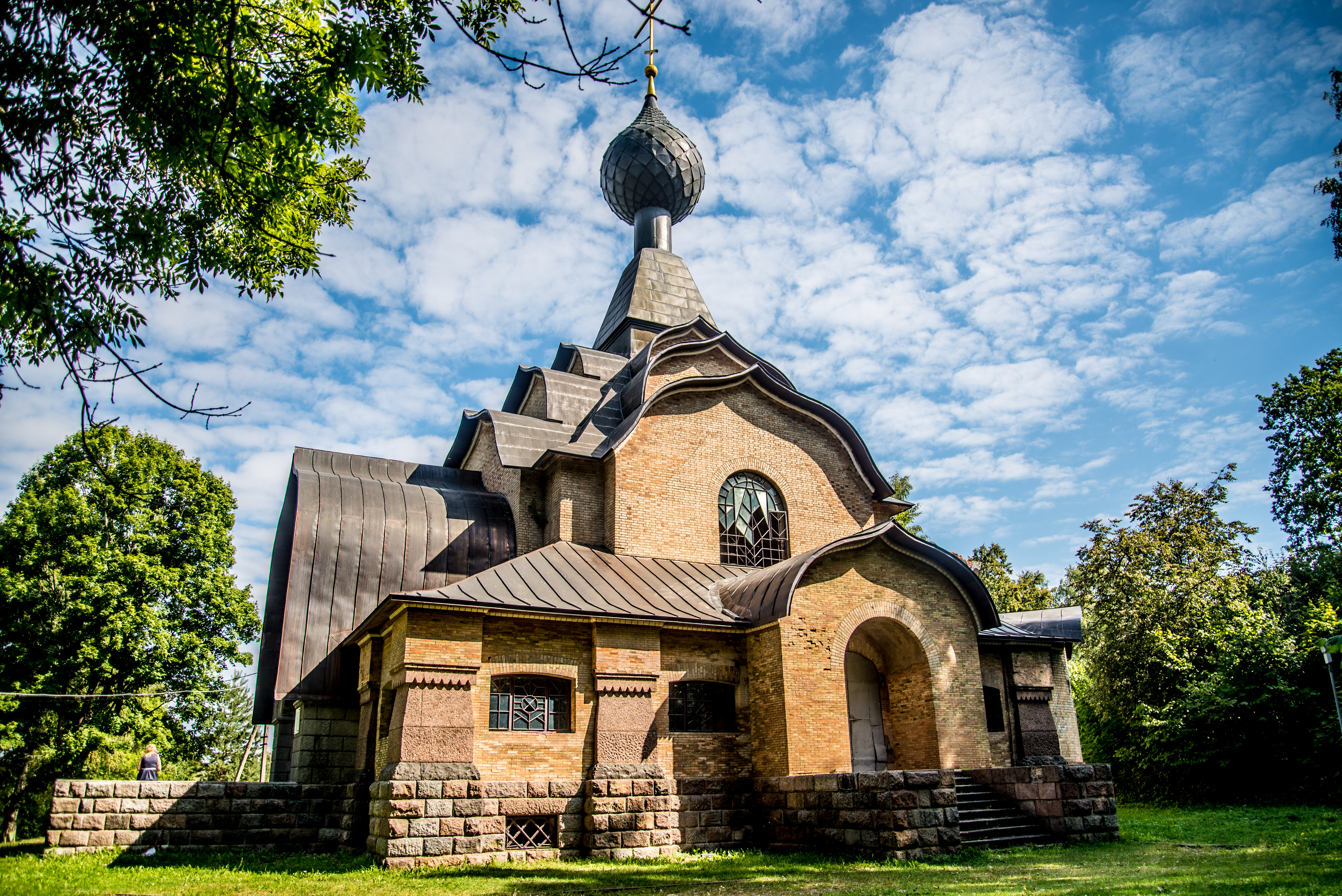
The Church of the Holy Spirit in Talashkino

The federally protected monuments in the districts include a park in the selo of Talashkino and an estate in the selo of Syrokorenskiye Lipki

In Katyn, just west of the city of Smolensk, thousands of Polish officers were executed in 1940 by the Soviet regime. The site currently features a memorial, built around the Katyn war cemetery, and a museum.

In Talashkino, Mariya Tenisheva opened in the end of the 19th century an artisan center, where local people were employed. Most of the buildings of the estate have been lost. Those which survived, including the Church of the Holy Spirit and the fairy-tale reconstruction by Sergey Malyutin, currently host a museum.
