= Vikhra =

River in Eastern Europe

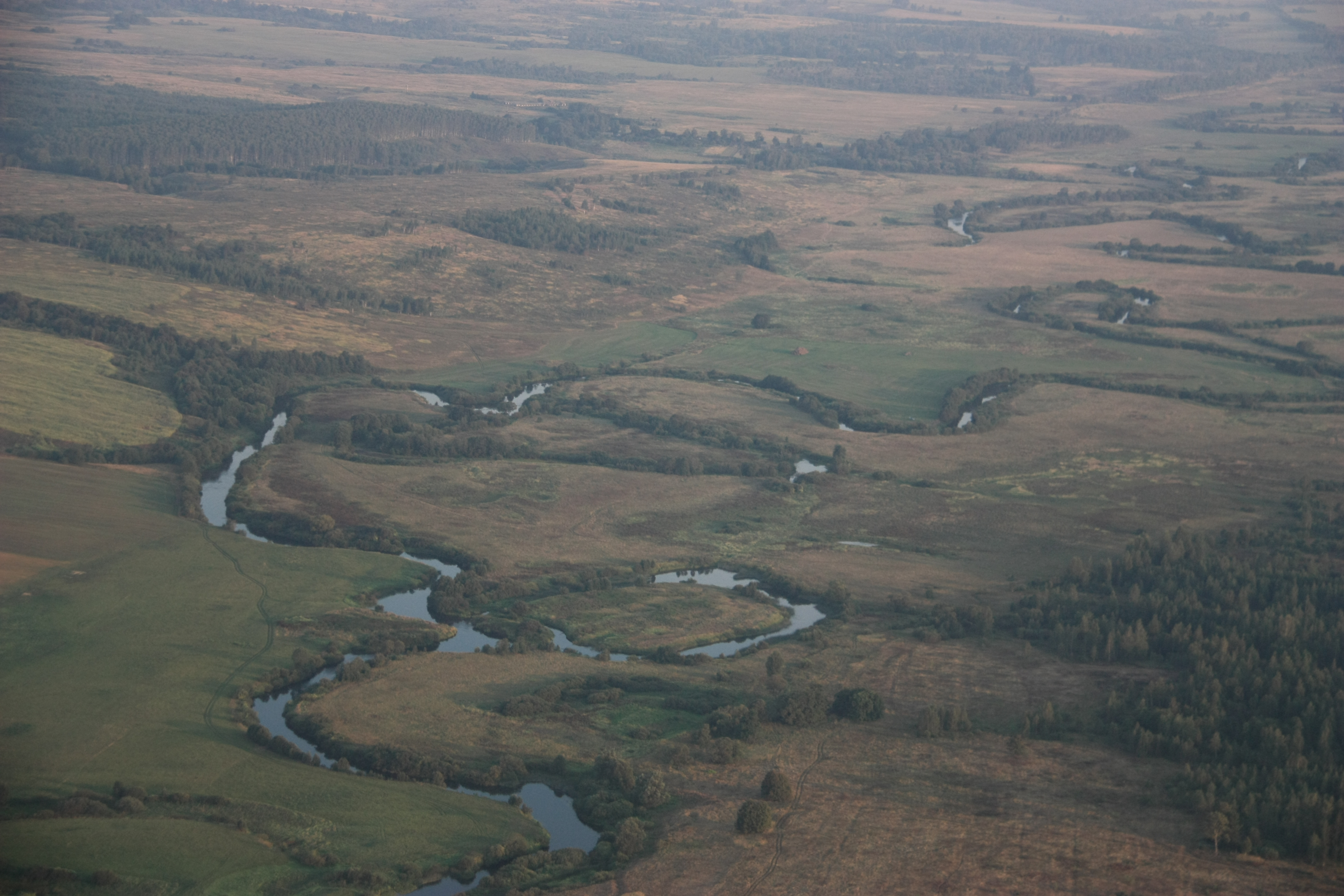

Location
- Country: Belarus, Russia

Physical characteristics
- Source
  - location: Smolensky District, Russia
- Mouth: Sozh
  - location: near Mstsislaw, Belarus
  - coordinates: 54°00′41″N 31°51′34″E
- Length: 128 km (80 mi)

Basin features
- Progression: Sozh→ Dnieper→ Dnieper–Bug estuary→ Black Sea

The Vikhra (Russian: Вихра), or Vichra (Belarusian: Віхра) is a river in Smolensky, Krasninsky, and Monastyrshchinsky Districts of Smolensk Oblast, Russia, and Mstsislaw District of Mogilev Region, Belarus. A right tributary of the Sozh, the Vikhra flows through Monastyrshchinsky District and is 128 kilometres (80 mi) long. The urban-type settlement of Monastyrshchina is located on the banks of the Vikhra. The Battle of the Vikhra River occurred in the area.

The source of the Vikhra is close to the village of Korytnva in the southwest of Smolensk District, Smolensk Oblast, Russia. The Vikhra flows south, crosses the north-eastern corner of Krasninsky District and enters Monastyrshchinsky District. In Monastyrshchina, it turns west and in the village of Skreplevo turns southwest. It crosses into Belarus downstream of the village of Bachenki. The mouth of the Vikhra is near the town of Mstsislaw.
