= Khmost =

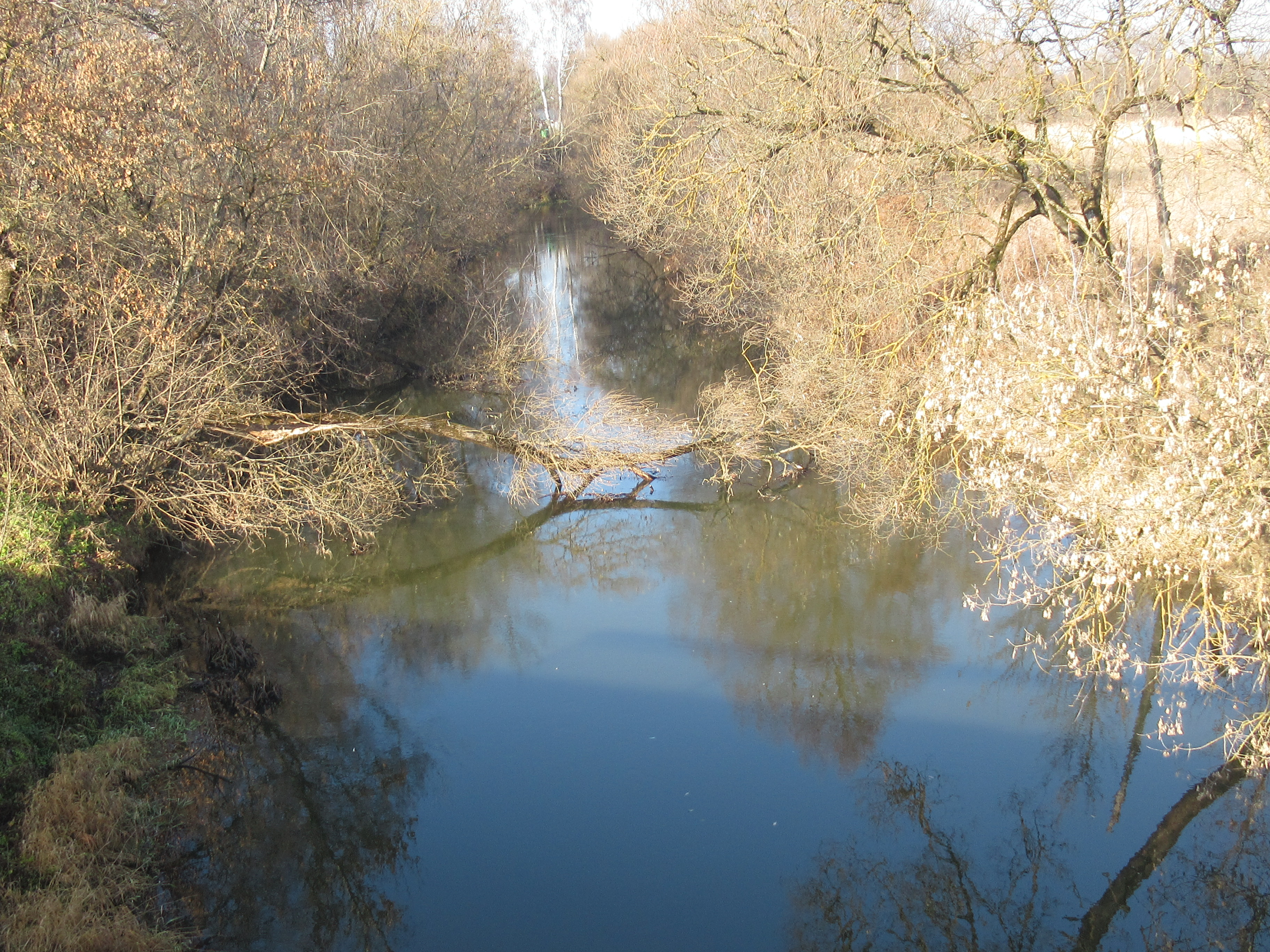
- Native name: Хмость (Russian)

Location
- Country: Russia

Physical characteristics
- Mouth: Dnieper
  - coordinates: 54°45′34.1″N 32°34′20.4″E
- Length: 135 km (84 mi)
- Basin size: 636 km^{2} (246 sq mi)

Basin features
- Progression: Dnieper→ Dnieper–Bug estuary→ Black Sea

The Khmost (Russian: Хмость) is a river in Dukhovshchinsky, Smolensky, and Kardymovsky Districts of Smolensk Oblast, Russia, a right tributary of the Dnieper. The length of the river is 135 kilometres (84 mi), and the area of its drainage basin is 636 square kilometres (246 mi^{2}). The settlement of Kardymovo is located near the river mouth.

The source of the Khmost is in the west of Dukhovshchina District, north of the village of Vasino. It flows south and downstream of the village of Botino makes the border between Dukhovshchinsky and Smolensky Districts. A short stretch of the river crosses Smolensky District, then the river turns east and forms the border between Dukhovshchinsky and Kardymovsky Districts. In the village of Lisichino, it departs from the border and flows southeast through Kardymovsky District. The mouth of the Khmost is south of the village of Ryzhkovo.
