= Rudnyansky District, Smolensk Oblast =

Rudnyansky District Руднянский район (Russian)
- District
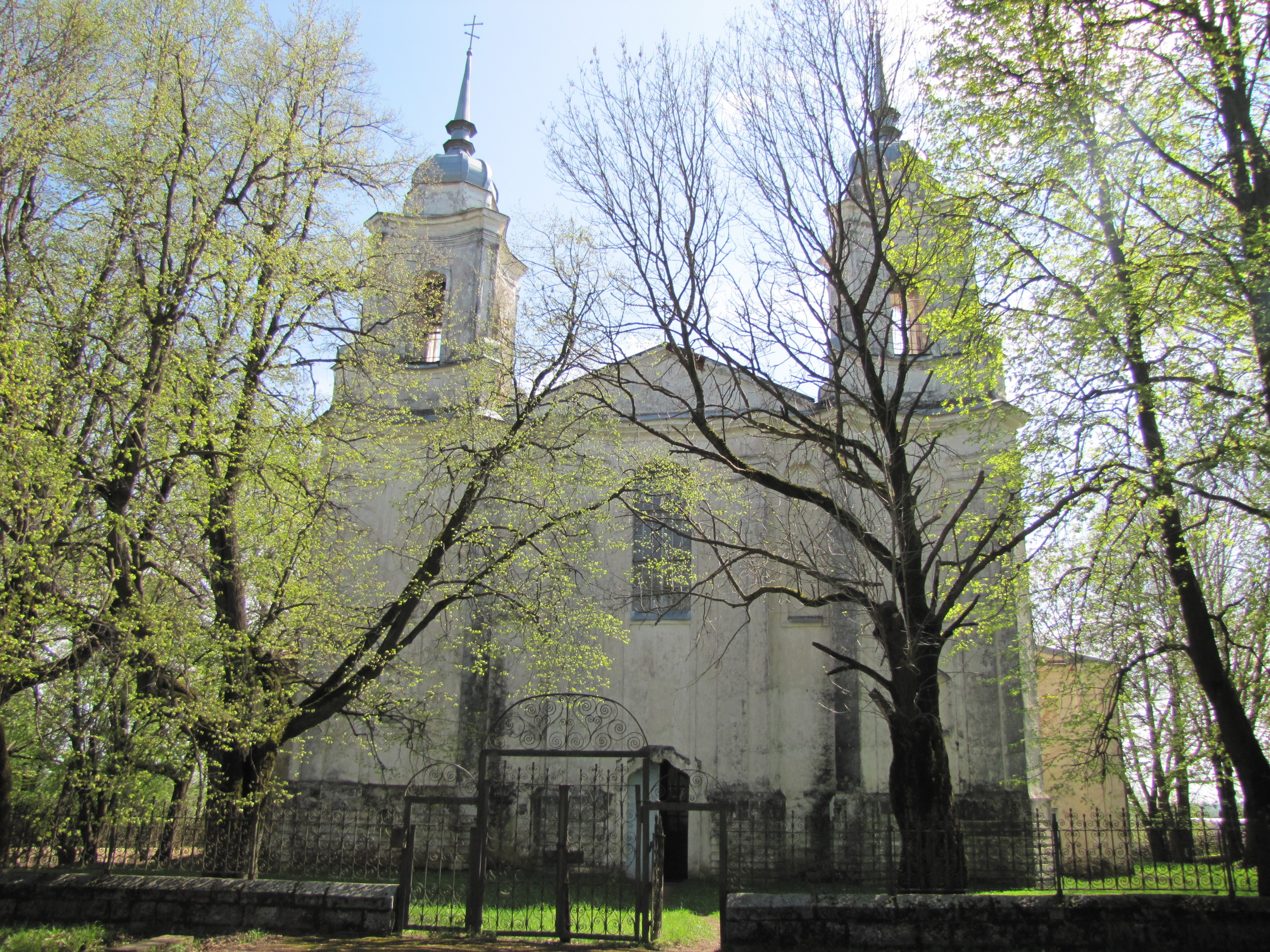
- Church of the Assumption of the Virgin, 18th century, in the village of Lyubavichi.

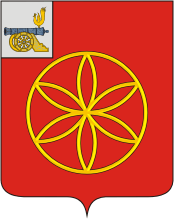
- Coat of arms
- Location of Rudnyansky District in Smolensk Oblast
- Coordinates: 54°48′33″N 30°45′02″E
- Country: Russia
- Federal subject: Smolensk Oblast
- Established: 1 October 1929
- Administrative center: Rudnya

Area
  - Total: 2,111.41 km^{2} (815.22 sq mi)

Population (2010 Census)
  - Total: 25,244
  - Density: 11.956/km^{2} (30.966/sq mi)
  - Urban: 53.9%
  - Rural: 46.1%

Administrative structure
  - Administrative divisions: 1 Urban settlements (towns), 1 Urban settlements (urban-type settlements), 8 Rural settlements
  - Inhabited localities: 1 cities/towns, 1 urban-type settlements, 210 rural localities

Municipal structure
  - Municipally incorporated as: Rudnyansky Municipal District
  - Municipal divisions: 2 urban settlements, 8 rural settlements
- Time zone: UTC+3 (MSK)
- OKTMO ID: 66638000
- Website: http://рудня.рф/

Rudnyansky District (Russian: Рудня́нский райо́н) is an administrative and municipal district (raion), one of the twenty-five in Smolensk Oblast, Russia. It is located in the west and northwest of the oblast and borders with Velizhsky District in the north, Demidovsky District in the northeast, Smolensky District in the east, Krasnensky District in the south, and with Vitebsk, Liozna, and Dubrowna Districts of Vitebsk Region of Belarus in the west. The area of the district is 2,111.41 square kilometers (815.22 sq mi). Its administrative center is the town of Rudnya. Population: 25,244 (2010 Census); 28,037 (2002 census); 34,724 (1989 Soviet census). The population of Rudnya accounts for 39.7% of the district's total population.

== Geography ==
The area of the district is elongated north to south and is split between drainage basin of the Western Dvina (north) and the Dnieper (south). The biggest tributary of the Western Dvina within the district is the Kasplya River, which crosses the northern part of the district from east to west; its major left tributary is the Rutovech River. Rivers in the southern part of the district flow to the Dnieper. The largest tributary of the Dnieper in the district is the Malaya Berezina River.

== History ==
The area was settled in the prehistory, and there are multiple archaeological sites in the district. Rudnya (as the settlement of Rodnya) is first mentioned in 1363 since the lands were occupied by Andrei of Polotsk and included in the Principality of Smolensk. Since 1404, it belonged to the Grand Duchy of Lithuania, then to Poland, which was confirmed in 1667 by the Truce of Andrusovo.

After the First Partition of Poland in 1772 the area was included into newly established Babinovichsky Uyezd of Mogilev Governorate. In 1840, the uyezd was abolished and merged into Orshansky Uyezd of the same governorate. In 1919, Mogilev Governorate was abolished, and Orshansky Uyezd was included into Gomel Governorate. In 1920, the uyezd was included into Vitebsk Governorate, and shortly the area was transferred to Smolensky Uyezd of Smolensk Governorate. In 1926, Rudnya was granted the town status.

The area was south of the Pale of Settlement, and Jews were allowed to settle here. In particular, the village of Lyubavichi gave the name to Chabad-Lubavitch branch of Hassidism. Virtually all Jews who stayed until World War II were massacred in 1941 during the Holocaust.

On 12 July 1929, governorates and uyezds were abolished, and Rudnyansky District with the administrative center in Rudnya was established. The district belonged to Smolensk Okrug of Western Oblast. On August 1, 1930 the okrugs were abolished, and the districts were subordinated directly to the oblast. On 27 September 1937 Western Oblast was abolished and split between Oryol and Smolensk Oblasts. Rudnyansky District was transferred to Smolensk Oblast. Between 1941 and September 1943, during WWII, the district was occupied by German troops.

On 12 July 1929, Kasplyansky District with the administrative center in the selo of Kasplya was established as well in the areas which previously belonged to Demidovsky, Dukhovshchinsky, and Smolensky Uyezds. The district belonged to Smolensk Okrug of Western Oblast. On 1 February 1932, the district was abolished and split between Demidovsky, Dukhovshchinsky, Rudnyansky, and Smolensky Districts. In 1938, it was re-established; it belonged to Smolensk Oblast. In 1961, Kasplyansky District was abolished and merged into Smolensky District.

Another district established on 12 July 1929 was Ponizovsky District with the administrative center in the selo of Ponizovye. It was created in the areas which previously belonged to Demidovsky Uyezd. The district belonged to Smolensk Okrug of Western Oblast. In 1930, the district was abolished and split between Demidovsky and Rudnyansky Districts. In 1935, it was re-established, and in 1937, it was transferred to Smolensk Oblast. In 1961, Ponizovsky District was abolished and split between Demidovsky and Rudnyansky Districts.

== Economy ==
=== Industry ===
80% of the industrial production in the district is produced by food industry. There is also production of shoes and of doors and windows.

=== Agriculture ===
The main agricultural specialization of the district is cattle breeding for meat and milk production. There is also growing of flax.

=== Transportation ===
The railway connecting Smolensk with Vitebsk and further with Daugavpils crosses the southern part of the district. Rudnya is the largest railway station.

The R120 highway connecting Smolensk with the state border between Russia and Belarus, and continuing across the border to Vitebsk, runs through the district, passing Rudnya. The R130 highway connects Rudnya to Demidov.

== Culture and recreation ==
The district contains a number of cultural heritage monuments of federal significance, including the monument to the first Katyusha rocket launcher military usage during World War II in Rudnya.

In Rudnya, there is a history museum and a museum-house of Mikhail Yegorov. The latter is a subdivision of Smolensk State Museum Reserve. Yegorov, who was born close to Rudnya, was one of the two Soviet soldiers who raised a flag over the Reichstag on 2 May 1945, after the Battle of Berlin.
