= Ugransky District =

Ugransky District Угранский район (Russian)
- District
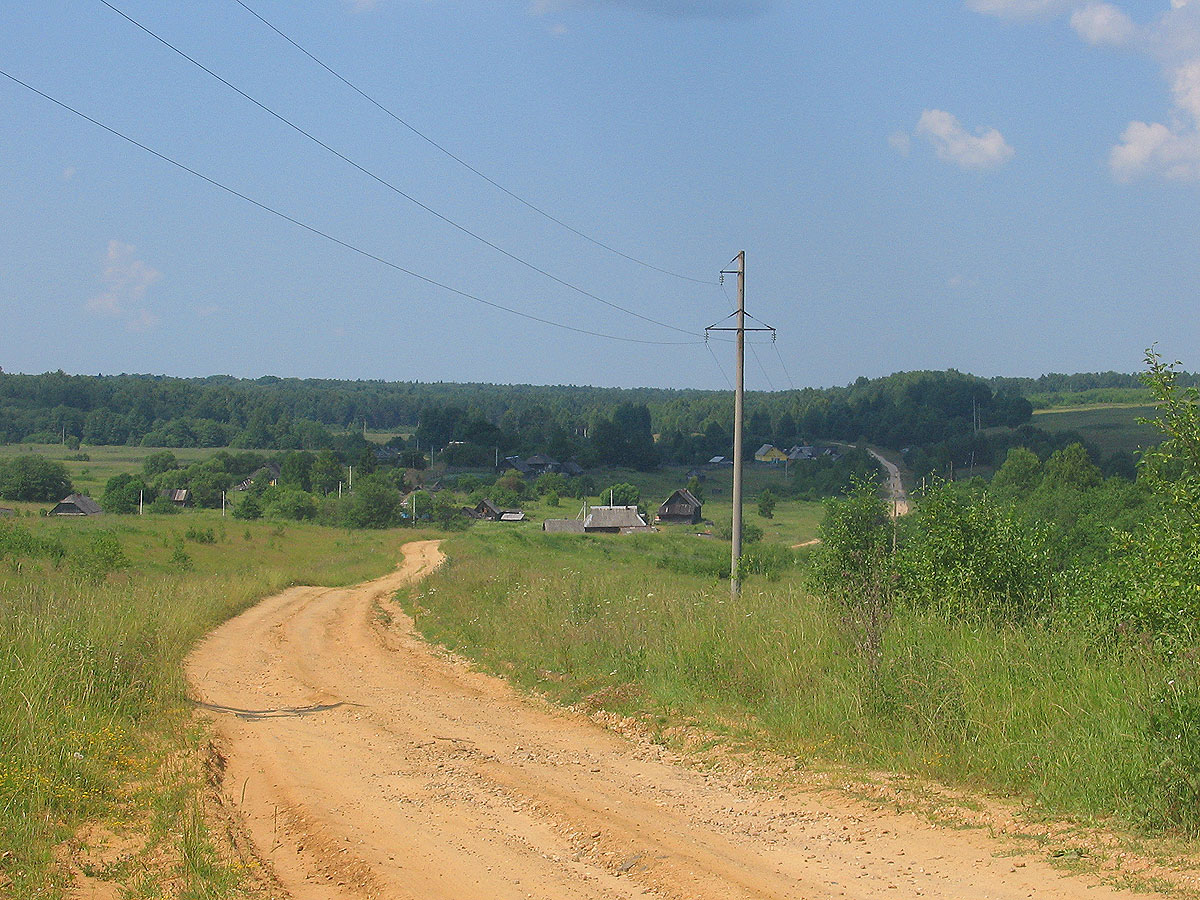
- Landscape in Ugransky District
- Flag Coat of arms
- Location of Ugransky District in Smolensk Oblast
- Coordinates: 54°47′00″N 34°20′10″E
- Country: Russia
- Federal subject: Smolensk Oblast
- Established: 1961
- Administrative center: Ugra

Area
  - Total: 2,868.52 km^{2} (1,107.54 sq mi)

Population (2010 Census)
  - Total: 8,916
  - Density: 3.108/km^{2} (8.050/sq mi)
  - Urban: 48.0%
  - Rural: 52.0%

Administrative structure
  - Administrative divisions: 17 Rural settlements
  - Inhabited localities: 202 rural localities

Municipal structure
  - Municipally incorporated as: Ugransky Municipal District
  - Municipal divisions: 0 urban settlements, 17 rural settlements
- Time zone: UTC+3 (MSK)
- OKTMO ID: 66650000
- Website: https://admin-ugra.ru/

Ugransky District (Russian: Угрáнский райо́н) is an administrative and municipal district (raion), one of the twenty-five in Smolensk Oblast, Russia. It is located in the east of the oblast. The area of the district is 2,868.52 square kilometers (1,107.54 sq mi). Its administrative center is the rural locality (a selo) of Ugra. Population: 8,916 (2010 Census); 11,022 (2002 census); 14,005 (1989 Soviet census). The population of Ugra accounts for 48.0% of the district's total population.

== People ==
- Mikhail Isakovsky (1900–1973)
