= Old Smolensk Road =

Old Smolensk Road (Russian: Старая Смоленская дорога) is a historical road (tract) in the Smolensk Oblast and Moscow Oblast, connecting the Moscow Kremlin and the Smolensk Fortress. On the Smolensk - Kardymovo - Dorogobuzh - Vyazma section it coincides with the P134 road, after Vyazma the roads diverge: P134 - to the north towards Zubtsov, Old Smolensk- to the east towards Mozhaysk. Another remnant of the Smolensk tract in the Moscow Oblast is the A100 Mozhaysk Highway. After the construction of the Moscow - Brest highway, which was completed in 1940, the Old Smolensk Road lost its national significance and is used mainly for intraregional communications, and in some places it disappeared completely and is not visible even as clearings on maps. The sections from Smolensk to Dorogobuzh and from Vyazma to Bushukovo are in good condition. From Bushukovo to the Chebotovo tract there is an ordinary forest road. From Vyazma to Gagarin the road is practically invisible.

== History ==
The origin of the Old Smolensk Road dates back to the 14th-15th centuries. The road was the oldest and shortest water-land route from Europe to the Moscow lands. Its description can be found in the mid-16th century book "Notes on Muscovite Affairs" by the Austrian ambassador Sigismund von Herberstein, the books of Augustin von Mayerberg and the "Travel Notes" of the steward P. A. Tolstoy. The road from Smolensk to Moscow was difficult and dangerous. According to Augustin Meyerberg (1661), for 130 miles between Vyazma and Mozhaysk, the road went through a continuous forest, the wilderness of which is protected by one village, Tsaryovo-Zaymishche. Adolf Lisek (1675) wrote that "The road from Smolensk to Moscow is as dangerous from bears as it is boring because of the continuous forests. The only road between these cities goes along a strip of cut forest about 30 feet wide with a log flooring on the swamps".

Later, the road straightens out, becomes a straight road and completely overland. Only by the 18th century does the road fully take shape, acquire its outlines, and become overgrown with inns, post stations, and waypoints.

According to the project of engineer Ivan Solovyov, in the 18th century, the former seasonal dirt road received a crushed stone surface, a little later, residents of the surrounding settlements under the leadership of Ivan Glinka near the village of Solovyovo built two floating bridges across the Dnieper, Solovyova ferry, and year-round communication between Smolensk and Moscow became possible along the road.

Russian troops retreated along the Smolensk road under the onslaught of Napoleon's army during the French invasion of Russia. Napoleon retreated along it with the remnants of a large army from Russia to the west, starting from Vyazma. According to contemporaries, in October 1812, from Moscow, along the Old Kaluga Road and Old Smolensk Road, in "mixed fear, the French troops ran away after their leader".

The military actions during the Great Patriotic War of 1941-1945 left the most significant mark in the entire long history of the Old Smolensk Road. Repeating the events of 1812, the exhausted Red Army retreated to Moscow. Up until 1943, the front line passed in the area of the village Uvarovka, and the German troops, whose offensive had finally stalled due to fierce resistance from the Soviet soldiers, began to prepare for defense in the Durykino area, mentioned in the geography of the Old Smolensk Road. In 1943, repeating the path of Napoleon's army, the German troops began to retreat along the entire front line as a result of the Rzhev-Vyazma operation. The events of the war of 1812 and the Great Patriotic War are associated with fierce battles at the Solovyovskaya crossing.

For a long time, the main European road route from Moscow ran along part of the route from Vyazma to Smolensk. in this section, the road is pulled to the bed of the Dnieper River and has a less dissected relief (a technological advantage) than the relief of the route of the modern straightened M1 "Belarus" highway.
