= Kardymovo =

Kardymovo Кардымово
- Urban-type-settlement
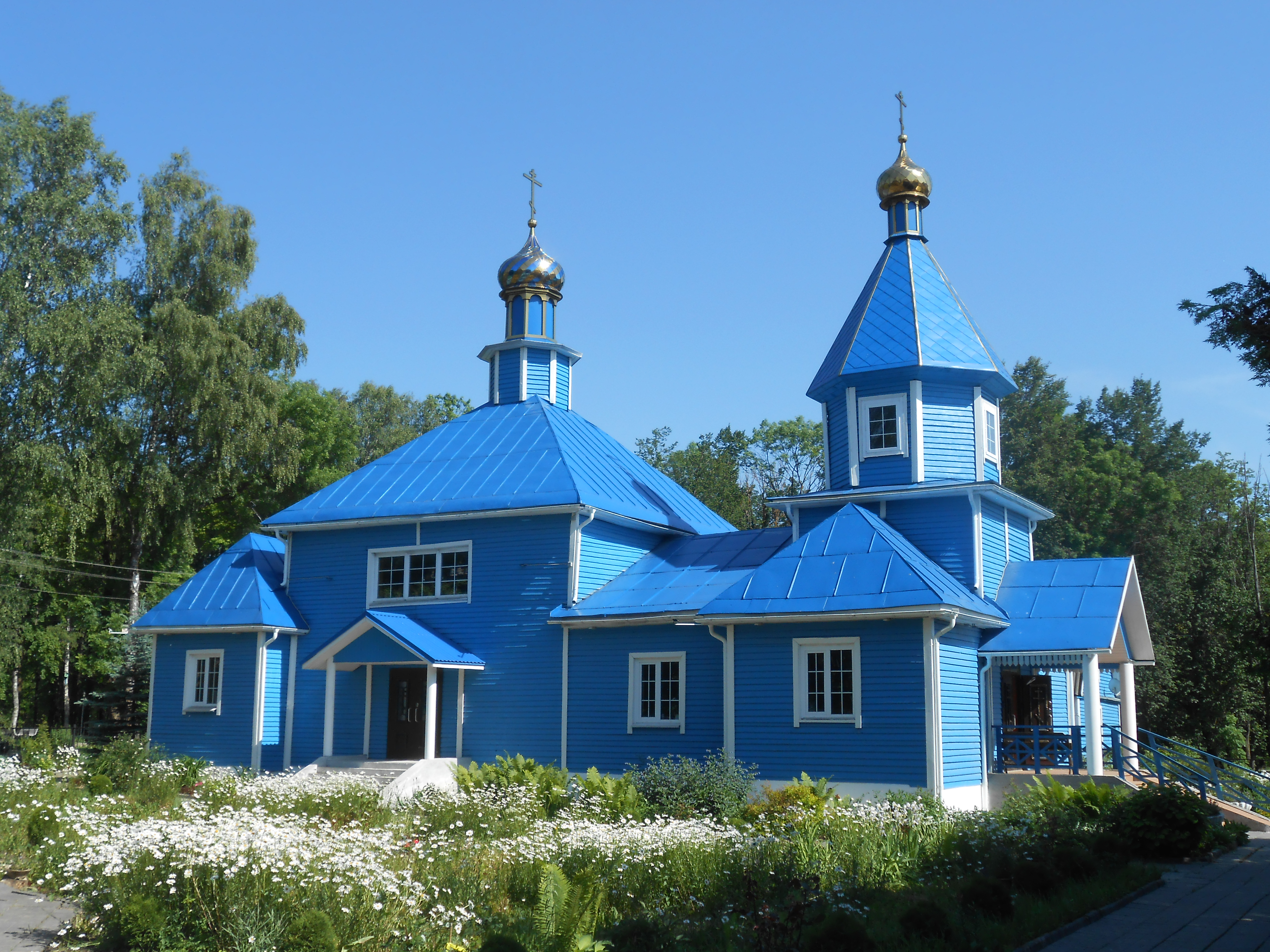
- Our Lady of Kazan church in Kardymovo
- Interactive map of Kardymovo
- Location of Kardymovo Kardymovo (European Russia) Kardymovo (Russia)
- Coordinates: 54°53′24″N 32°25′54″E
- Country: Russia
- Federal subject: Smolensk Oblast
- First mentioned: 1859
- Urban-type-settlement status since: 1979

Population (2010 Census)
  - Total: 11,852
  - Estimate (2024): 4,443 (−62.5%)

Municipal status
  - Municipal district: Kardymovsky Municipal District
  - Urban settlement: Kardymovsky Urban Settlement
  - Capital of: Kardymovsky Municipal District, Kardymovsky Urban Settlement
- Time zone: UTC+3 (MSK)
- Postal code: 215850
- Dialing code: +7 48167
- OKTMO ID: 66623151051

Kardymovo (Russian: Кардымово) is an urban locality (an urban-type settlement) in Smolensk Oblast, Russia. It is the administrative center of Kardymovsky District.

== Geography ==
The town is located on the railway Smolensk-Moscow, 28 km north-east of Smolensk. Through the settlement flows the Khmost River, a tributary of the Dnieper.

== Climate ==
Kardymovo has a warm-summer humid continental climate (Dfb in the Köppen climate classification).

Climate data for Kardymovo
Month	Jan	Feb	Mar	Apr	May	Jun	Jul	Aug	Sep	Oct	Nov	Dec	Year
Mean daily maximum °C (°F)	−4.5 (23.9)	−3.6 (25.5)	1.9 (35.4)	10.8 (51.4)	17.2 (63.0)	20.3 (68.5)	22.9 (73.2)	21.4 (70.5)	15.8 (60.4)	8.4 (47.1)	2.3 (36.1)	−1.7 (28.9)	9.3 (48.7)
Daily mean °C (°F)	−6.5 (20.3)	−6.1 (21.0)	−1.4 (29.5)	6.3 (43.3)	12.9 (55.2)	16.5 (61.7)	19.1 (66.4)	17.6 (63.7)	12.2 (54.0)	5.9 (42.6)	0.6 (33.1)	−3.5 (25.7)	6.1 (43.0)
Mean daily minimum °C (°F)	−8.9 (16.0)	−9.0 (15.8)	−5.0 (23.0)	1.3 (34.3)	7.7 (45.9)	11.7 (53.1)	14.6 (58.3)	13.4 (56.1)	8.5 (47.3)	3.3 (37.9)	−1.3 (29.7)	−5.5 (22.1)	2.6 (36.6)
Average precipitation mm (inches)	54 (2.1)	47 (1.9)	46 (1.8)	47 (1.9)	76 (3.0)	85 (3.3)	92 (3.6)	81 (3.2)	68 (2.7)	70 (2.8)	57 (2.2)	52 (2.0)	775 (30.5)
Source: https://en.climate-data.org/asia/russian-federation/smolensk-oblast/kardymovo-32861/

== History ==
Kardymovo is mentioned for the first time in a list of populated areas for 1859. It belonged to Tsurikovskaya Volost of Smolensky Uyezd of Smolensk Governorate, later to Nadvinskaya Volost of Dukhovshhinsky Uyezd. The settlement developed around Kamenka railway station and incorporated the village of Kamenka. In 1924, it became the center of Kardymovskaya Volost of Smolensky Uyezd, also of Smolensk Governorate. On 12 July 1929, governorates and uyezds were abolished, and Kardymovsky District with the administrative center in the selo of Kardymovo was established. The district belonged to Smolensk Okrug of Western Oblast. On August 1, 1930, the okrugs were abolished, and the districts were subordinated directly to the oblast. On 20 November 1930 Kardymovsky District was abolished and merged into Smolensky District. On 18 January 1935 Kardymovsky District was re-established. On 27 September 1937 Western Oblast was abolished and split between Oryol and Smolensk Oblasts. Kardymovsky District was transferred to Smolensk Oblast. Between 1941 and September 1943, during WWII, the district was occupied by German troops. On 1 February 1963, Kardymovsky District was merged into Smolensky and Yartsevsky Districts, but on 23 March 1977 it was re-established. Between 1963 and 1977, Kardymovo was the center of Kardymovsky Selsoviet of Yartsevsky District. In 1979, Kardymovo was made an urban-type settlement.

== Economy ==
=== Industry ===
In Kardymovo, there is a beer production plant, as well as enterprises of plastic, rubber, and equipment production.

=== Transportation ===
Kardymovo railway station is on the railway connecting Moscow and Smolensk. A few trains stop here.

== Landmarks ==
Church of the Kazan Icon of the Mother is located in the settlement as well as the Kardymovsky District Local History Museum The museum exhibition devoted to the history Kardymovsky District and talks about the monuments of archeology, Old Smolensk Road, the War of 1812, Battle of Smolensk in 1941, the occupation area of 1941–1943, partisan and underground struggle in the region and the 312th Infantry Division that liberated Kardymovo. The museum has an interesting exhibition on the ethnography of the area. Here are the household items and tools, clothing and other stuff.
