= Ugra, Smolensk Oblast =

Ugra Угра
- Urban-type settlement
- View of Ugra from the railway line

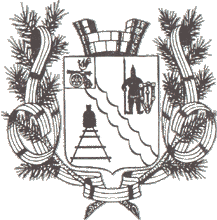
- Coat of arms
- Interactive map of Ugra
- Location of Ugra Ugra (Smolensk Oblast)
- Coordinates: 54.7796°N 34.3264°E
- Country: Russia
- Federal subject: Smolensk Oblast
- Administrative district: Ugransky District
- Founded: 1929

Population (2010 Census)
  - Total: 4,278
  - Estimate (2021): 3,452 (−19.3%)
- Time zone: UTC+3 (MSK)
- Postal code: 215430
- OKTMO ID: 66650477101

Ugra (Russian: Угра) is an urban locality (an urban-type settlement) in Ugransky District of Smolensk Oblast, Russia. Population: 4,278 (2010 census); 4,848 (2002 census); 5,059 (1989 Soviet census).

== Climate ==
Ugra has a warm-summer humid continental climate (Dfb in the Köppen climate classification).

Climate data for Ugra
Month	Jan	Feb	Mar	Apr	May	Jun	Jul	Aug	Sep	Oct	Nov	Dec	Year
Mean daily maximum °C (°F)	−5 (23)	−4.2 (24.4)	1.4 (34.5)	10.7 (51.3)	17.4 (63.3)	20.4 (68.7)	23.1 (73.6)	21.6 (70.9)	15.8 (60.4)	8.5 (47.3)	2 (36)	−2.1 (28.2)	9.1 (48.5)
Daily mean °C (°F)	−7 (19)	−6.6 (20.1)	−1.8 (28.8)	6.3 (43.3)	13.1 (55.6)	16.6 (61.9)	19.3 (66.7)	17.7 (63.9)	12.3 (54.1)	5.9 (42.6)	0.2 (32.4)	−3.9 (25.0)	6.0 (42.8)
Mean daily minimum °C (°F)	−9.3 (15.3)	−9.5 (14.9)	−5.4 (22.3)	1.2 (34.2)	7.8 (46.0)	11.8 (53.2)	14.8 (58.6)	13.4 (56.1)	8.5 (47.3)	3.2 (37.8)	−1.7 (28.9)	−5.9 (21.4)	2.4 (36.3)
Average precipitation mm (inches)	48 (1.9)	42 (1.7)	43 (1.7)	46 (1.8)	76 (3.0)	78 (3.1)	93 (3.7)	78 (3.1)	63 (2.5)	64 (2.5)	53 (2.1)	49 (1.9)	733 (29)
Source: https://en.climate-data.org/asia/russian-federation/smolensk-oblast/ugra-32860/
