= Khislavichi =

Khislavichi Хиславичи
- Settlement
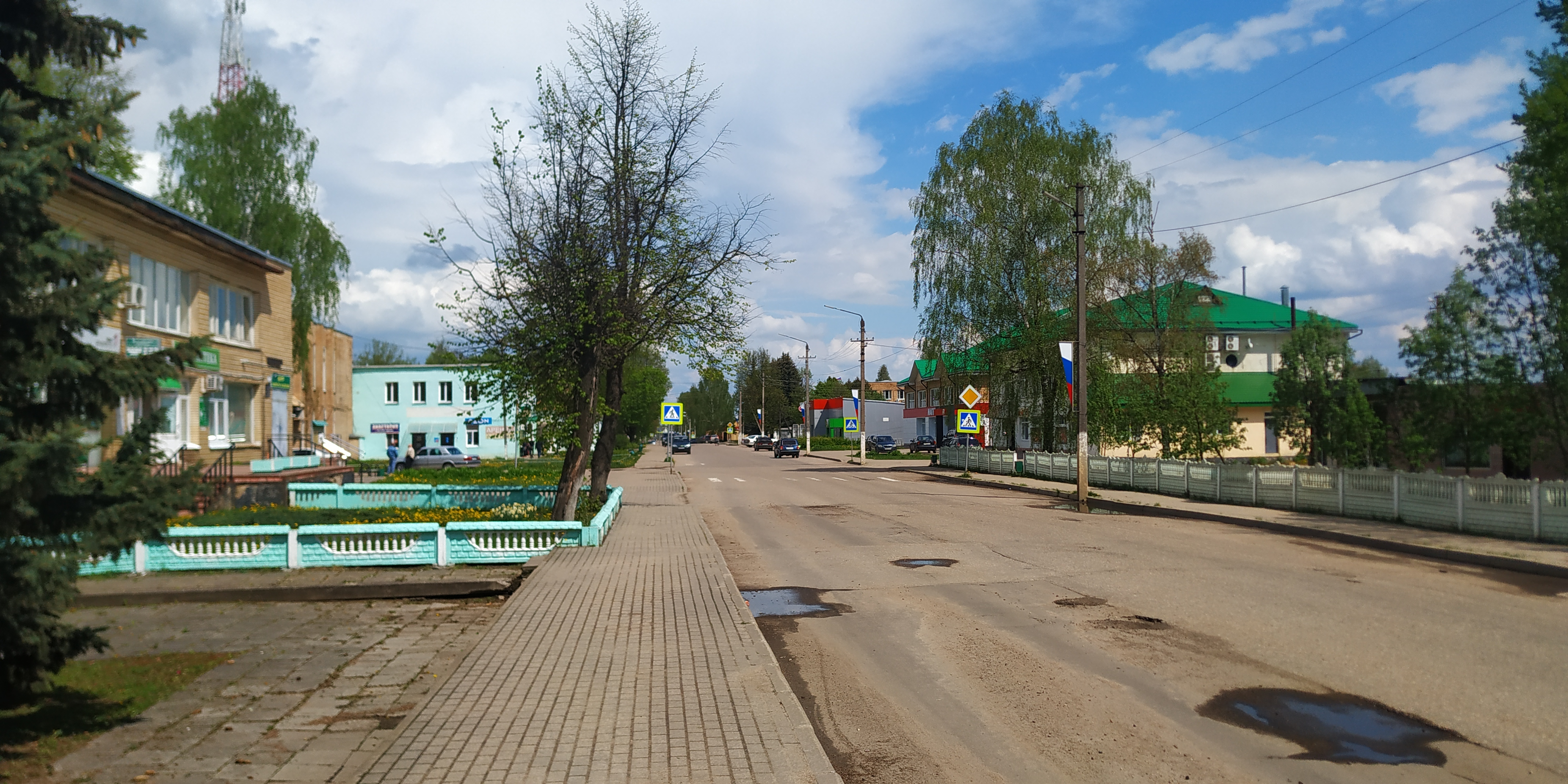
- Interactive map of Khislavichi
- Location of Khislavichi Khislavichi (European Russia) Khislavichi (Russia)
- Country: Russia
- Federal subject: Smolensk Oblast
- Administrative district: Khislavichsky District
- Urban settlementSelsoviet: Khislavichskoye
- Urban-type settlement status since: 1935

Population (2010 Census)
  - Total: 4,138
  - Estimate (2024): 3,095 (−25.2%)

Administrative status
  - Capital of: Khislavichsky District

Municipal status
  - Municipal district: Khislavichsky Municipal District
  - Urban settlement: Khislavichskoye Urban Settlement
  - Capital of: Khislavichsky Municipal District
- Time zone: UTC+3 (MSK)
- Postal code: 216620
- OKTMO ID: 66652151051

Khislavichi (Russian: Хиславичи, Yiddish: חאסלאוויץ Khoslovitz) is an urban locality (an urban-type settlement) and the administrative center of Khislavichsky District of Smolensk Oblast, Russia, located by the right bank of the Sozh River. Population: 4,138 (2010 census); 4,617 (2002 census); 5,013 (1989 Soviet census).

== History ==
Khislavichi is first mentioned in 1526. It belonged to the Polish–Lithuanian Commonwealth, and since the 18th century miasteczko (shtetl) Khislavichi (Polish: Chosławicze) was in Mstsislaw Voivodeship. The last starost of Chosławicze was Jan Ciechanowiecki, appointed by King Augustus III of Poland in 1754.

In 1772, as a result of the First Partition of Poland, it was transferred to the Russian Empire and included in its Mogilev Governorate. It belonged to Mstislavsky Uyezd of the Mogilev Governorate. By the end of the 19th century, of the total population of 4,361, 3,642 were Jews and 739 were of Russian Orthodox faith. There were eight synagogues and two wooden churches. The settlement belonged to Saltykov Russian noble family.

In 1919, Mogilev Governorate was abolished, and Mstislavsky Uyezd was transferred to Smolensk Governorate. On 3 March 1924, a half of Mstislavsky Uyezd was transferred to Byelorussian Soviet Socialist Republic, and seven volosts, including Khislavichi, were left in Smolensk Governorate.

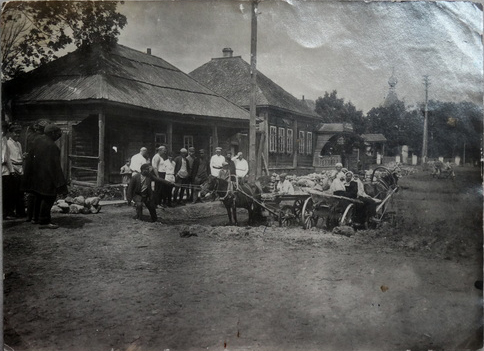
Khislavichi in 1930

On 12 July 1929, governorates and uyezds were abolished, and Khislavichsky District with the administrative center in the settlement of Khislavichi was established. The district belonged to Roslavl Okrug of Western Oblast. On August 1, 1930, the okrugs were abolished, and the districts were subordinated directly to the oblast. In 1935, Khislavichi was granted urban-type settlement status. On 27 September 1937 Western Oblast was abolished and split between Oryol and Smolensk Oblasts. Khislavichsky District was transferred to Smolensk Oblast.

The German Army entered Khislavichi on July 16, 1941. 800 Jews of the town were resettled in a ghetto. In September or October 1941, 120 to 150 Jews were murdered in a mass execution. On March 20, 1942, the Hilfspolizei entered the ghetto. Under the command of the Einsatzgruppen, they killed all the Jews of the ghetto about 150 meters northwest of the town in a ditch near the local machine and tractor station.

In 1963, during the Khrushchyov administrative reform, Khislavichsky District was merged into Monastyrshchinsky District. In 1965, it was re-established.

== Geography ==
=== Climate ===
Khislavichi has a warm-summer humid continental climate (Dfb in the Köppen climate classification).

Climate data for Khislavichi
Month	Jan	Feb	Mar	Apr	May	Jun	Jul	Aug	Sep	Oct	Nov	Dec	Year
Mean daily maximum °C (°F)	−4.3 (24.3)	−3.5 (25.7)	2.1 (35.8)	11.5 (52.7)	17.8 (64.0)	20.9 (69.6)	23.4 (74.1)	22.1 (71.8)	16.4 (61.5)	9.1 (48.4)	2.7 (36.9)	−1.4 (29.5)	9.7 (49.5)
Daily mean °C (°F)	−6.3 (20.7)	−5.9 (21.4)	−1.3 (29.7)	6.9 (44.4)	13.4 (56.1)	16.9 (62.4)	19.4 (66.9)	18.1 (64.6)	12.6 (54.7)	6.3 (43.3)	0.9 (33.6)	−3.2 (26.2)	6.5 (43.7)
Mean daily minimum °C (°F)	−8.8 (16.2)	−8.9 (16.0)	−5.2 (22.6)	1.6 (34.9)	8.1 (46.6)	11.9 (53.4)	14.7 (58.5)	13.6 (56.5)	8.7 (47.7)	3.4 (38.1)	−1 (30)	−5.2 (22.6)	2.7 (36.9)
Average precipitation mm (inches)	52 (2.0)	45 (1.8)	45 (1.8)	47 (1.9)	71 (2.8)	84 (3.3)	95 (3.7)	75 (3.0)	63 (2.5)	68 (2.7)	55 (2.2)	49 (1.9)	749 (29.6)
Source: https://en.climate-data.org/asia/russian-federation/smolensk-oblast/khislavichi-245390/

== Economy ==
=== Transportation ===
Khislavichi is on a main road which connects Pochinok with Mstsislaw, where it continues to Orsha and Krychaw. In Khislavichi, another road branches northwest to Monastyrshchina. There are also local roads with bus traffic originating from Khislavichi.

The closest railway station is in Pochinok.

The Sozh is not navigable in Khislavichi.

== Culture and recreation ==
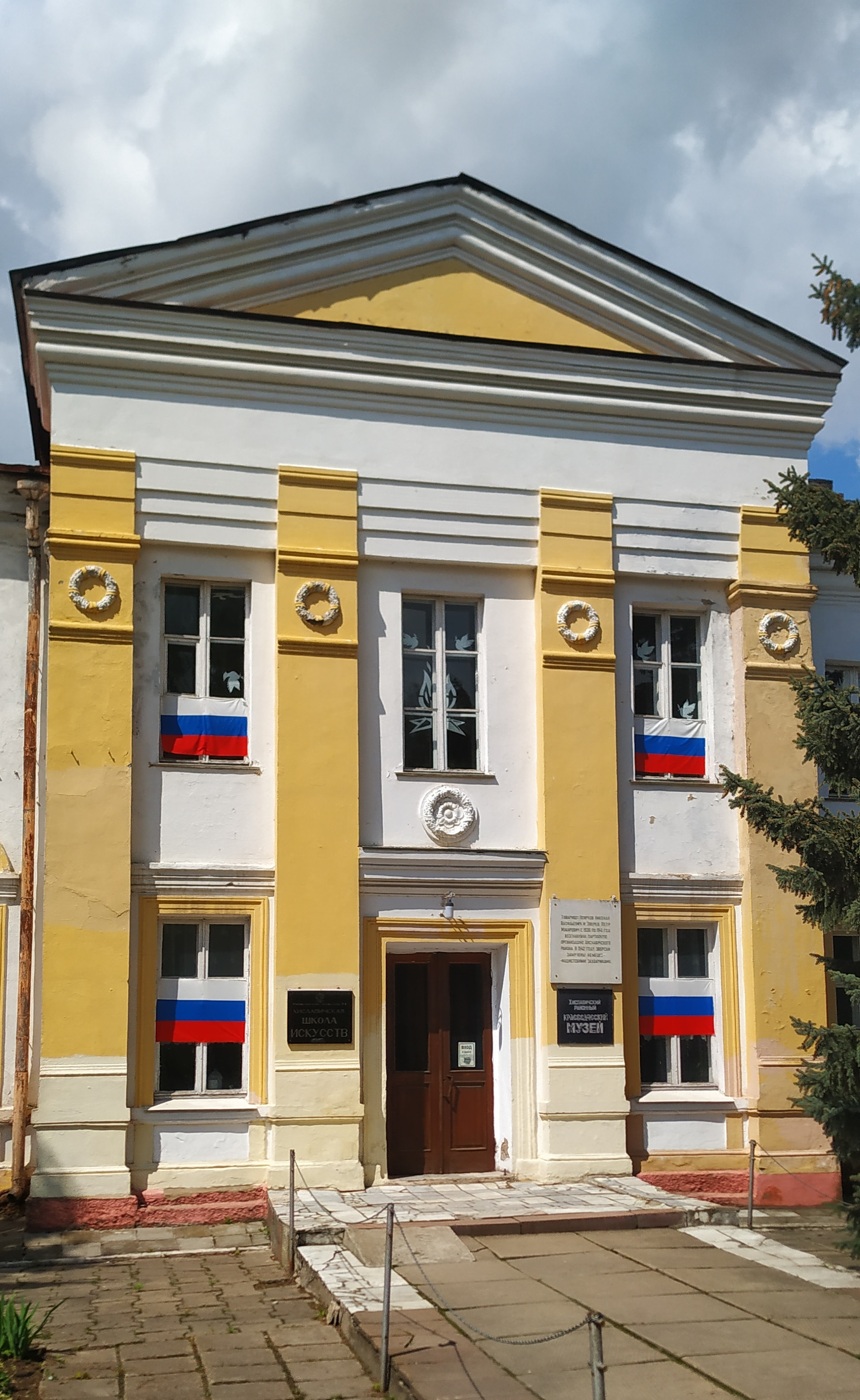
Art school and local museum

In Khislavichi, there is a local museum.
