= Ozyorny, Smolensk Oblast =

Ozyorny Озёрный
- Urban-type settlement
- Interactive map of Ozyorny
- Location of Ozyorny Ozyorny (Smolensk Oblast)
- Coordinates: 55.5799°N 32.4098°E
- Country: Russia
- Federal subject: Smolensk Oblast
- Administrative district: Dukhovshchinsky District

Population (2010 Census)
  - Total: 5,933
  - Estimate (2024): 4,763 (−19.7%)
- Time zone: UTC+3 (MSK)
- Postal code: 216239
- OKTMO ID: 66616155051

Ozyorny (Russian: Озёрный) is an urban locality (an urban-type settlement) in Dukhovshchinsky District of Smolensk Oblast, Russia. Population: 5,933 (2010 census); 6,380 (2002 census); 6,829 (1989 Soviet census).
