= Monastyrshchina, Monastyrshchinsky District, Smolensk Oblast =

Monastyrshchina Монастырщина
- Settlement
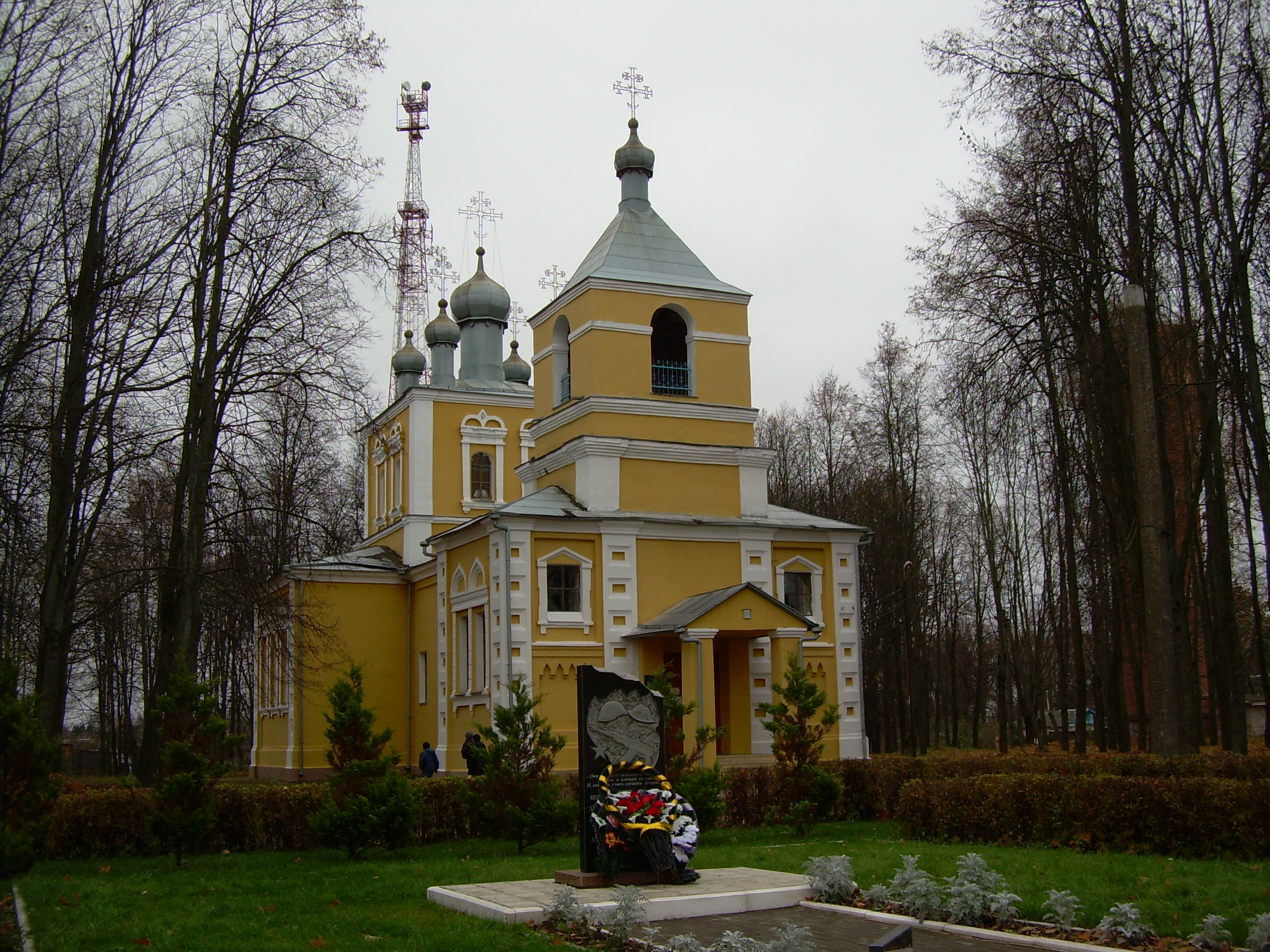
- Interactive map of Monastyrshchina
- Location of Monastyrshchina Monastyrshchina (Smolensk Oblast)
- Coordinates: 54°21′N 31°50′E
- Country: Russia
- Federal subject: Smolensk Oblast
- Administrative district: Monastyrshchinsky District
- Urban settlementSelsoviet: Monastyrshchinskoye
- Urban-type settlement status since: 1965

Population (2010 Census)
  - Total: 4,065
  - Estimate (2024): 3,127 (−23.1%)

Administrative status
  - Capital of: Monastyrshchinsky District

Municipal status
  - Municipal district: Monastyrshchinsky Municipal District
  - Urban settlement: Monastyrshchinskoye Urban Settlement
  - Capital of: Monastyrshchinsky Municipal District
- Time zone: UTC+3 (MSK)
- Postal code: 216130
- OKTMO ID: 66627151051

Monastyrshchina (Russian: Монастырщина, Polish: Monasterszczyzna) is an urban locality (a settlement) and the administrative center of Monastyrshchinsky District of Smolensk Oblast, Russia. It is located on the left bank of the Vikhra River, in the western part of the oblast. Population: 4,065 (2010 census); 4,622 (2002 census); 5,166 (1989 Soviet census).

== History ==
Monastyrshchina is known since the end of the 13th century or the beginning of the 14th century, when a skete was founded here. Between second half of the 14th century and the middle of the 17th century, the area belonged intermittently to the Grand Duchy of Lithuania, to Poland, and to the Grand Duchy of Moscow. In the 18th century, Monastyrshchina belonged to Poland, and in 1772, as a result of the First Partition of Poland, it was transferred to Russia and included in the newly established Mogilev Governorate. It belonged to Mstislavsky Uyezd. In 1919, Mogilev Governorate was abolished, and Mstislavsky Uyezd was transferred to Smolensk Governorate. In 1925, Monastyrshchina Volost was established.

On 12 July 1929, governorates and uyezds were abolished, and Monastyrshchinsky District with the administrative center in the selo of Monastyrshchina was established. The district belonged to Smolensk Okrug of Western Oblast. On August 1, 1930, the okrugs were abolished, and the districts were subordinated directly to the oblast. On 27 September 1937 Western Oblast was abolished and split between Oryol and Smolensk Oblasts. Monastyrshchinsky District was transferred to Smolensk Oblast. Between 1941 and 1943, during WWII, the district was occupied by German troops. In January 1965, Monastyrshchina was granted urban-type settlement status.

== Climate ==
Monastyrshchina has a warm-summer humid continental climate (Dfb in the Köppen climate classification).

Climate data for Monastyrshchina
Month	Jan	Feb	Mar	Apr	May	Jun	Jul	Aug	Sep	Oct	Nov	Dec	Year
Mean daily maximum °C (°F)	−4.2 (24.4)	−3.4 (25.9)	2.2 (36.0)	11.4 (52.5)	17.6 (63.7)	20.8 (69.4)	23.2 (73.8)	22 (72)	16.3 (61.3)	9 (48)	2.7 (36.9)	−1.4 (29.5)	9.7 (49.4)
Daily mean °C (°F)	−6.2 (20.8)	−5.8 (21.6)	−1.2 (29.8)	6.9 (44.4)	13.3 (55.9)	16.9 (62.4)	19.3 (66.7)	18 (64)	12.6 (54.7)	6.3 (43.3)	0.9 (33.6)	−3.1 (26.4)	6.5 (43.6)
Mean daily minimum °C (°F)	−8.6 (16.5)	−8.7 (16.3)	−4.9 (23.2)	1.8 (35.2)	8.1 (46.6)	11.9 (53.4)	14.7 (58.5)	13.6 (56.5)	8.8 (47.8)	3.5 (38.3)	−1 (30)	−5.1 (22.8)	2.8 (37.1)
Average precipitation mm (inches)	52 (2.0)	46 (1.8)	46 (1.8)	47 (1.9)	73 (2.9)	85 (3.3)	96 (3.8)	75 (3.0)	62 (2.4)	66 (2.6)	56 (2.2)	50 (2.0)	754 (29.7)
Source: https://en.climate-data.org/asia/russian-federation/smolensk-oblast/monastyrshchina-34301/

== Economy ==
=== Industry ===
There is a cheese production factory in Monastyrshchina.

=== Transportation ===
The closest railway station is in Pochinok, on the railway connecting Smolensk and Bryansk via Roslavl.

Monastyrshchina is connected by paved roads with Smolensk, Pochinok, and Khislavichi, and has access to the M1 highway, connecting Moscow with Belarus via Smolensk. A road of a poor quality connects Monastyrshchina with Mstsislaw across the border with Belarus.

The Vikhra is not navigable.

== Culture and recreation ==
The Sts. Peter and Paul Church was built in 1906. There is a local museum in Monastyrshchina.
