= Yartsevo, Smolensk Oblast =

Town in Smolensk Oblast, Russia

Yartsevo Ярцево
- Town
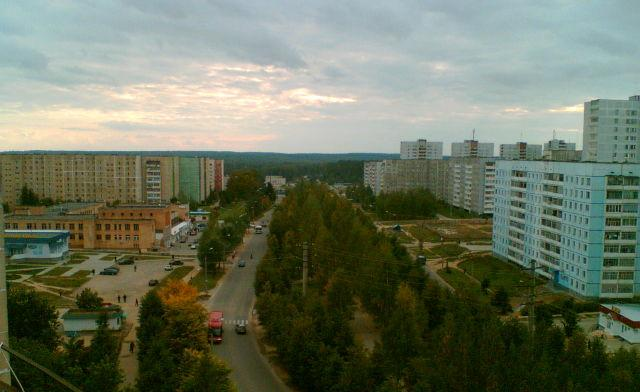
- Metallurgov Avenue in Yartsevo

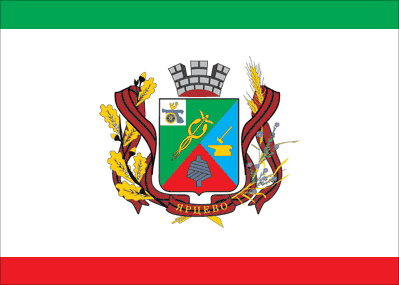
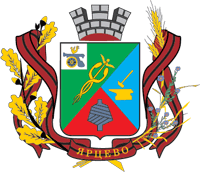
- Flag Coat of arms
- Interactive map of Yartsevo
- Location of Yartsevo Yartsevo (Smolensk Oblast)
- Coordinates: 55°04′N 32°42′E
- Country: Russia
- Federal subject: Smolensk Oblast
- Administrative district: Yartsevsky District
- Urban settlementSelsoviet: Yartsevskoye
- First mentioned: 1610
- Town status since: 1926

Area
  - Total: 58.11 km^{2} (22.44 sq mi)
- Elevation: 190 m (620 ft)

Population (2010 Census)
  - Total: 47,848
  - Estimate (2025): 39,801 (−16.8%)
  - Density: 823.4/km^{2} (2,133/sq mi)

Administrative status
  - Capital of: Yartsevsky District, Yartsevskoye Urban Settlement

Municipal status
  - Municipal district: Yartsevsky Municipal District
  - Urban settlement: Yartsevskoye Urban Settlement
  - Capital of: Yartsevsky Municipal District, Yartsevskoye Urban Settlement
- Time zone: UTC+3 (MSK)
- Postal codes: 215800, 215801, 215805–215807, 215849
- Dialing code: +7 48143
- OKTMO ID: 66658101001

Yartsevo (Russian: Я́рцево) is a town and the administrative center of Yartsevsky District in Smolensk Oblast, Russia, located on the Vop River, 63 kilometers (39 mi) northeast of Smolensk, the administrative center of the oblast. Population: 47,848 (2010 census); 52,617 (2002 census); 52,304 (1989 Soviet census).

== History ==
It was founded on the spot of a village of Yartsevo-Perevoz (Я́рцево-Перево́з), known since 1859. It grew due to the construction of a cotton mill in 1873. Later on, a soap factory, a brickworks, a sawmill, and a foundry were built in the area. Yartsevo was granted town status in 1926.

== Administrative and municipal status ==
Within the framework of administrative divisions, Yartsevo serves as the administrative center of Yartsevsky District. As an administrative division, it is, together with three rural localities, incorporated within Yartsevsky District as Yartsevskoye Urban Settlement. As a municipal division, this administrative unit also has urban settlement status and is a part of Yartsevsky Municipal District.

=== Politics ===
In 1991, Viktor Vasilyevich Vuymin became the first "democratic" mayor (head of the Yartsevo district). In 1997, after his term of office expired, the district council of deputies elected a new head - representative of the Communist Party of the Russian Federation, Yuri Viktorovich Romanovsky. Romanovsky served almost the full term - until 2000 when he left "of his own free will." Yuri Mikhailovich Mochalov became mayor. He remained in this post for a little over a year - on 16 November 2001, he died in a car accident.

In 2002, the city was led by Viktor Nikolayevich Shchyogolev. In the same year, after the election of a new governor of the Smolensk Oblast, Shchegolev left his post. Yuri Vasilyevich Pankov, already the fifth head of administration in the recent history of Yartsev, became the mayor. Two years later, he also left "of his own free will." On 23 June 2004, the city was headed by Vladimir Aleksandrovich Galkin, who was also elected by the deputy corps.

However, in 2004, changes were made to the Charter, according to which the head is elected in popular elections. Thus, on 24 December 2004, elections were held, and Galkin won. However, in connection with the reform of local government and the division of a single municipality - Yartsevo district - into 13 separate ones (Yartsevo district, the city of Yartsevo, and 11 rural settlements), in 2005, elections were held for the head of the city of Yartsevo and the heads of all 11 rural settlements. Galkin nominated himself for them and won. Thus, until 2011, Galkin was both the mayor of the city and the head of the Yartsevo district.

In 2010, amendments to the city charter were adopted. Now, the head of the city is elected by deputies from among its members, and the head of the administration is appointed by contract. From 2 June 2010 to 28 January 2013, the head of the district administration was Alexander Petrakov.

In 2013, the city administration was liquidated, and its powers were delegated to the district administration. During the existence of the city administration (2006-2013), three heads of the city administration were replaced: Vladimir Galkin (2006-2011), Maxim Serkov (2012), and Yuri Pankov (2012-2013).

From 21 March 2013 to 20 February 2015, the head of the district administration (merged with the city) was Yuri Pankov (for the second time since 2002–2004).

Since 3 April 2015, the head of the Yartsevo district administration is Vladimir Makarov.

==== Heads of administration ====
Heads of the administration of the Yartsevo district (in 2006-2013 there was also an administration of the city of Yartsevo):

#	Name	Years in office	Party	Title
1	Viktor Vuimin	16/12/1991 — 25/02/1997		Head of Administration of Yartsevo District
2	Yuri Romanovsky	26/02/1997 — 26/09/2000	Communist Party of the Russian Federation	Head of Administration of Yartsevo District
3	Yuri Mochalov	27/09/2000 — 16/11/2001	Independent	Head of Administration of Yartsevo District
Acting	Nikolai Nadelin	19/11/2001 — 13/01/2002	Independent	Acting Head of Administration of Yartsevo District
4	Viktor Shchyogolev Щёголев	14/01/2002 — 22/08/2002	Independent	Head of Administration of Yartsevo District
5	Yuri Pankov	03/09/2002 — 22/06/2004	Independent	Head of Administration of Yartsevo District
6	Vladimir Galkin	23/06/2004 — 12/03/2011	Independent	Head of the municipal formation "Yartsevo district" (until 02/03/2011), head of administration of the municipal formation "Yartsevo district" (until 25/12/2009), Head of the city of Yartsevo (until 12/03/2011)
Acting	Vyachislav Lyan	26/12/2009 — 01/06/2010		Acting head of the administration of the municipal formation "Yartsevsky district"
7	Alexander Petrakov	02/06/2010 — 28/01/2013		Head of Administration of the Municipal Formation "Yartsevsky District"
Acting	Viktor Grigoryev	29/01/2013 — 20/03/2013		Acting head of the administration of the municipal formation "Yartsevsky district"
8	Yuri Pankov	21/03/2013 — 20/02/2015	United Russia	Head of Administration of the Municipal Formation "Yartsevsky District"
Acting	Viktor Karabanov	21/02/2015 — 02/04/2015	United Russia	Acting head of the administration of the municipal formation "Yartsevsky district"
9	Vladimir Makarov	03/04/2015 — present	United Russia	Head of the municipal formation "Yartsevsky district" of the Smolensk Oblast (since 29/10/2015), head of the administration of the municipal formation "Yartsevsky district"

==== City council ====
On 19 September 2021, the 2021 regional elections took place. As a result, two factions were formed in the City Council: the Communist Party of the Russian Federation (13 people) and United Russia (7 people). Of the 20 deputies who entered the city council of the fourth convocation, a new city council chairman was chosen. Since September 2021, Nikolai Novoselov has been the head of the city and chairman of the city council of deputies.

Chairmen of the City Council:

#	Name	Years in office	Party	Title
1	Sergei Sokolov	2006 — 2011	Independent	Chairman of the City Council of the 1st convocation
2	Alexander Timoshkov	2011 — 2016	United Russia	Head of the city of Yartsevo, Chairman of the City Council of the 2nd convocation
3	Mikhail Kulikov	2016 — 2017	United Russia	Head of the city of Yartsevo, Chairman of the City Council of the 3rd convocation
4	Mikhail Frolov	2017 — 2021	United Russia	Head of the city of Yartsevo, Chairman of the City Council of the 3rd convocation
5	Nikolai Novoselov	2021 — present	Communist Party of the Russian Federation	Head of the city of Yartsevo, Chairman of the City Council of the 4th convocation

==== District council ====
Chairmen of the District Council:

#	Name	Years in office	Party	Title
1	Mikhail Yudenkov	1996 — 2001	Communist Party of the Russian Federation	Chairman of the District Council of the 1st convocation
2	Nikolay Khlapov	2001 — 2004		Chairman of the District Council of the 2nd convocation
3	Olga Vasilyeva	2005 — 2007	United Russia	Chairman of the District Council of the 3rd convocation
4	Vladimir Kozlov	2007 — 2009		Chairman of the District Council of the 3rd convocation
5	Vladimir Galkin	2009 — 2011	Independent	Head of the Yartsevo District, Chairman of the District Council of the 4th convocation
6	Konstantin Grashchenkov	2011 — 2014		Head of the Yartsevo District, Chairman of the District Council of the 4th convocation
7	Boris Avilov	2014 — 2015	United Russia	Head of the Yartsevo District, Chairman of the District Council of the 4th convocation
8	Vyacheslav Salnikov	2015 — 2020	United Russia	Chairman of the District Council of the 5th convocation
9	Irina Polyakova	2020 — present	United Russia	Chairman of the District Council of the 6th convocation

== Notable people ==
- Aleksandr Gennadievich Kurosh — mathematician.
- Svetlana Shkolina — high jumper.
- Noize MC - singer.

== See also ==
- Ivan Kamera (1897-1952), artillery general during World War II
