= Rudnya, Rudnyansky District, Smolensk Oblast =

Town in Smolensk Oblast, Russia

Rudnya Рудня
- Town
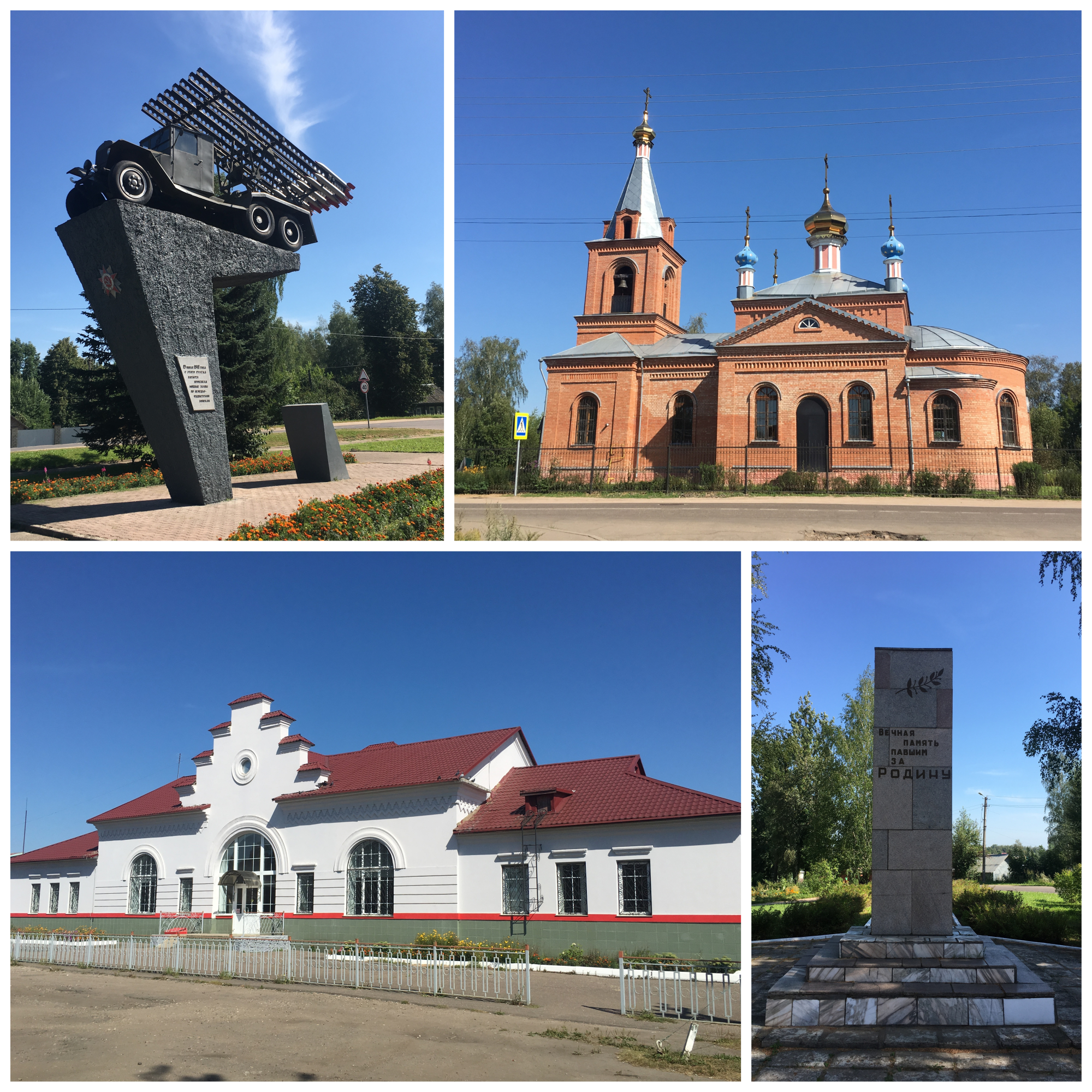

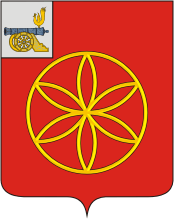
- Coat of arms
- Interactive map of Rudnya
- Location of Rudnya Rudnya (Smolensk Oblast)
- Coordinates: 54°57′N 31°06′E
- Country: Russia
- Federal subject: Smolensk Oblast
- Administrative district: Rudnyansky District
- Urban settlementSelsoviet: Rudnyanskoye
- First mentioned: 1363
- Town status since: 1926

Area
  - Total: 14.99 km^{2} (5.79 sq mi)
- Elevation: 190 m (620 ft)

Population (2010 Census)
  - Total: 10,030
  - Estimate (2025): 8,408 (−16.2%)
  - Density: 669.1/km^{2} (1,733/sq mi)

Administrative status
  - Capital of: Rudnyansky District, Rudnyanskoye Urban Settlement

Municipal status
  - Municipal district: Rudnyansky Municipal District
  - Urban settlement: Rudnyanskoye Urban Settlement
  - Capital of: Rudnyansky Municipal District, Rudnyanskoye Urban Settlement
- Time zone: UTC+3 (MSK)
- Postal codes: 216790, 216799
- OKTMO ID: 66638101001

Rudnya (Russian: Ру́дня, Polish: Rudnia) is a town and the administrative center of Rudnyansky District in Smolensk Oblast, Russia, located on the Malaya Berezina River (Dnieper's basin) 68 kilometers (42 mi) northwest of Smolensk, the administrative center of the oblast. Population: 10,030 (2010 census); 9,853 (2002 census); 11,032 (1989 Soviet census).

== History ==
Historical affiliations

Poland–Lithuania late 14th cent.–1569
Polish–Lithuanian Commonwealth 1569–1772
Russian Empire 1772–1917
Russian Republic 1917
Soviet Russia 1917–1922
Soviet Union 1922–1991
Russian Federation 1991–present

Rudnya (as the settlement of Rodnya) is first mentioned in 1363 since the lands were occupied by Andrei of Polotsk and included in the Principality of Smolensk. During Polish rule it was part of the Vitebsk Voivodeship. It was located on the route connecting Vitebsk and Smolensk.

After the First Partition of Poland in 1772 the area was included into newly established Babinovichsky Uyezd of Mogilev Governorate. In 1840, the uyezd was abolished and merged into Orshansky Uyezd of the same governorate. As part of Tsarist anti-Polish repressions, the local Catholic church was closed in 1866. In 1919, Mogilev Governorate was abolished, and Orshansky Uyezd was included into Gomel Governorate. In 1920, the uyezd was included into Vitebsk Governorate, and shortly the area was transferred to Smolensky Uyezd of Smolensk Governorate. In 1926, Rudnya was granted the town status.

On 12 July 1929, governorates and uyezds were abolished, and Rudnyansky District with the administrative center in Rudnya was established. The district belonged to Smolensk Okrug of Western Oblast. On August 1, 1930, the okrugs were abolished, and the districts were subordinated directly to the oblast. On 27 September 1937 Western Oblast was abolished and split between Oryol and Smolensk Oblasts. Rudnyansky District was transferred to Smolensk Oblast. Between 1941 and September 1943, during World War II, the district was occupied by German troops.

Rudnya is known as the maiden battle target of the famous Soviet multiple rocket launchers Katyusha. On July 14, 1941, an experimental artillery battery of seven launchers was first used in battle at Rudnya, under the command of Captain Ivan Flyorov, destroying a concentration of German troops with tanks, armored vehicles, and trucks at the marketplace, causing massive German Army casualties and its retreat from the town in panic.

== Administrative and municipal status ==
Within the framework of administrative divisions, Rudnya serves as the administrative center of Rudnyansky District. As an administrative division, it is incorporated within Rudnyansky District as Rudnyanskoye Urban Settlement. As a municipal division, this administrative unit also has urban settlement status and is a part of Rudnyansky Municipal District.

== Economy ==
=== Industry ===
80% of the industrial production in Rudnyansky District is produced by food industry. There is also production of shoes and of doors and windows.

=== Transportation ===
The railway connecting Smolensk with Vitebsk and further with Daugavpils passes Rudnya.

The R120 highway connecting Smolensk with the state border between Russia and Belarus, and continuing across the border to Vitebsk, passes Rudnya as well. The R130 highway connects Rudnya to Demidov.

== Culture and recreation ==
Rudnya contains a number of protected cultural heritage monuments, including the monument to the first Katyusha rocket launcher military usage during World War II in Rudnya.

July 14, 1941 was the site of the first combat use of Katyushas, when a battery of I. A. Flerov's rocket launchers directly attacked a concentration of Germans on the city's Market Square. After the capture of Vitebsk and the threat of a cauldron being formed, when Soviet troops were surrounded, and Army Commander Konev and the commander of the western direction Eremenko miraculously escaped death or capture along with the headquarters stationed in Rudnya, a critical situation developed. Therefore, the command decided to launch the first rocket salvos on this section of the front. On July 14, 1941, the command instructed Captain G. A. Adilbekov, commander of the combined tank battalion that united all the combat vehicles of the 102nd Tank Regiment of the 51st Tank Division, to provide reliable cover for the organized retreat of the troops and headquarters of three corps and the 19th Army near Rudnya. In a similar situation, on July 11 near Vitebsk, he also covered the retreat of infantry units. Katyusha salvos supported the tank crews in holding back the advancing 39th motorized corps of Goth. In honor of this event, there is a monument in the city - Katyusha on a pedestal.

In Rudnya, there is a history museum and a museum-house of Mikhail Yegorov. The latter is a subdivision of Smolensk State Museum Reserve. Yegorov, who was born close to Rudnya, was one of the two Soviet soldiers who raised a flag over the Reichstag on 2 May 1945, after the Battle of Berlin.

Rudnya at one point had a Shtetl status, meaning that the village had a large concentration of Jews living in it. Jewish families first arrived after the Pale of Settlement was established in the western Russian Empire in 1791, granting Jews the legality to live in this settlement area. In 1926, there were 2235 Jews in Rudnya, nearly half of the village's population at the time. Many Jews in Rudnya moved to larger cities such as Leningrad and Smolensk in the early 1900s due to the newly established Communist driven industrial boom in larger cities. Of the nearly 2000 Jews who remained in the village during WWII, most were killed by the Nazis during the Holocaust after a ghetto was established in Rudnya. Local Jews were shot to death in several murder operations between 1941 and 1943.

== Geography ==
=== Climate ===
Rudnya has a warm-summer humid continental climate (Dfb in the Köppen climate classification).

Climate data for Rudnya
| Month | Jan | Feb | Mar | Apr | May | Jun | Jul | Aug | Sep | Oct | Nov | Dec | Year |
|---|---|---|---|---|---|---|---|---|---|---|---|---|---|
| Mean daily maximum °C (°F) | −4.1 (24.6) | −3.2 (26.2) | 2.4 (36.3) | 11.2 (52.2) | 17.2 (63.0) | 20.5 (68.9) | 22.9 (73.2) | 21.6 (70.9) | 16.0 (60.8) | 8.7 (47.7) | 2.7 (36.9) | −1.3 (29.7) | 9.6 (49.2) |
| Daily mean °C (°F) | −6.1 (21.0) | −5.8 (21.6) | −1.1 (30.0) | 6.6 (43.9) | 13.0 (55.4) | 16.6 (61.9) | 19.0 (66.2) | 17.7 (63.9) | 12.4 (54.3) | 6.1 (43.0) | 1.0 (33.8) | −3.0 (26.6) | 6.4 (43.5) |
| Mean daily minimum °C (°F) | −8.6 (16.5) | −8.9 (16.0) | −4.9 (23.2) | 1.4 (34.5) | 7.7 (45.9) | 11.7 (53.1) | 14.5 (58.1) | 13.4 (56.1) | 8.6 (47.5) | 3.5 (38.3) | −0.9 (30.4) | −5.0 (23.0) | 2.7 (36.9) |
| Average precipitation mm (inches) | 54 (2.1) | 49 (1.9) | 47 (1.9) | 47 (1.9) | 73 (2.9) | 83 (3.3) | 98 (3.9) | 83 (3.3) | 69 (2.7) | 69 (2.7) | 59 (2.3) | 53 (2.1) | 784 (31) |
Source: https://en.climate-data.org/asia/russian-federation/smolensk-oblast/rudnya-37333/
