= Dukhovshchinsky Uyezd =

Subdivision of the Smolensk Governorate

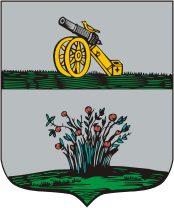
Coat of Arms of Dukhovshchina (1780)

Dukhovshchinsky Uyezd (Духовщинский уезд) was one of the subdivisions of the Smolensk Governorate of the Russian Empire. It was situated in the central part of the governorate. Its administrative centre was Dukhovshchina.

== Demographics ==
At the time of the Russian Empire Census of 1897, Dukhovshchinsky Uyezd had a population of 124,286. Of these, 98.3% spoke Russian, 0.5% Polish, 0.3% Latvian, 0.3% Yiddish, 0.3% Belarusian and 0.1% German as their native language.
