= Orshansky Uyezd =

Subdivision of the Mogilev Governorate of the Russian Empire

Orshansky Uyezd (Оршанский уезд) was one of the subdivisions of the Mogilev Governorate of the Russian Empire (from 1919 to 1920 of the Gomel Governorate and from 1920 to 1924 of the Vitebsk Governorate of the Russian SFSR). It was situated in the northern part of the governorate. Its administrative centre was Orsha.

== Demographics ==
At the time of the Russian Empire Census of 1897, Orshansky Uyezd had a population of 187,068. Of these, 79.9% spoke Belarusian, 12.1% Yiddish, 2.6% Russian, 2.0% Latvian, 1.8% Polish, 0.8% Lithuanian, 0.3% German and 0.3% Estonian as their native language.
