= Mstislavsky Uyezd =

Mstislavsky Uyezd (Мстиславский уезд) was one of the subdivisions of the Mogilev Governorate of the Russian Empire. It was situated in the northeastern part of the governorate. Its administrative centre was Mstsislaw.

== Demographics ==
At the time of the Russian Empire Census of 1897, Mstislavsky Uyezd had a population of 103,300. Of these, 81.5% spoke Belarusian, 16.1% Yiddish, 1.4% Russian and 0.9% Polish as their native language.
