= Yartsevsky District =

Yartsevsky District Ярцевский район (Russian)
- District
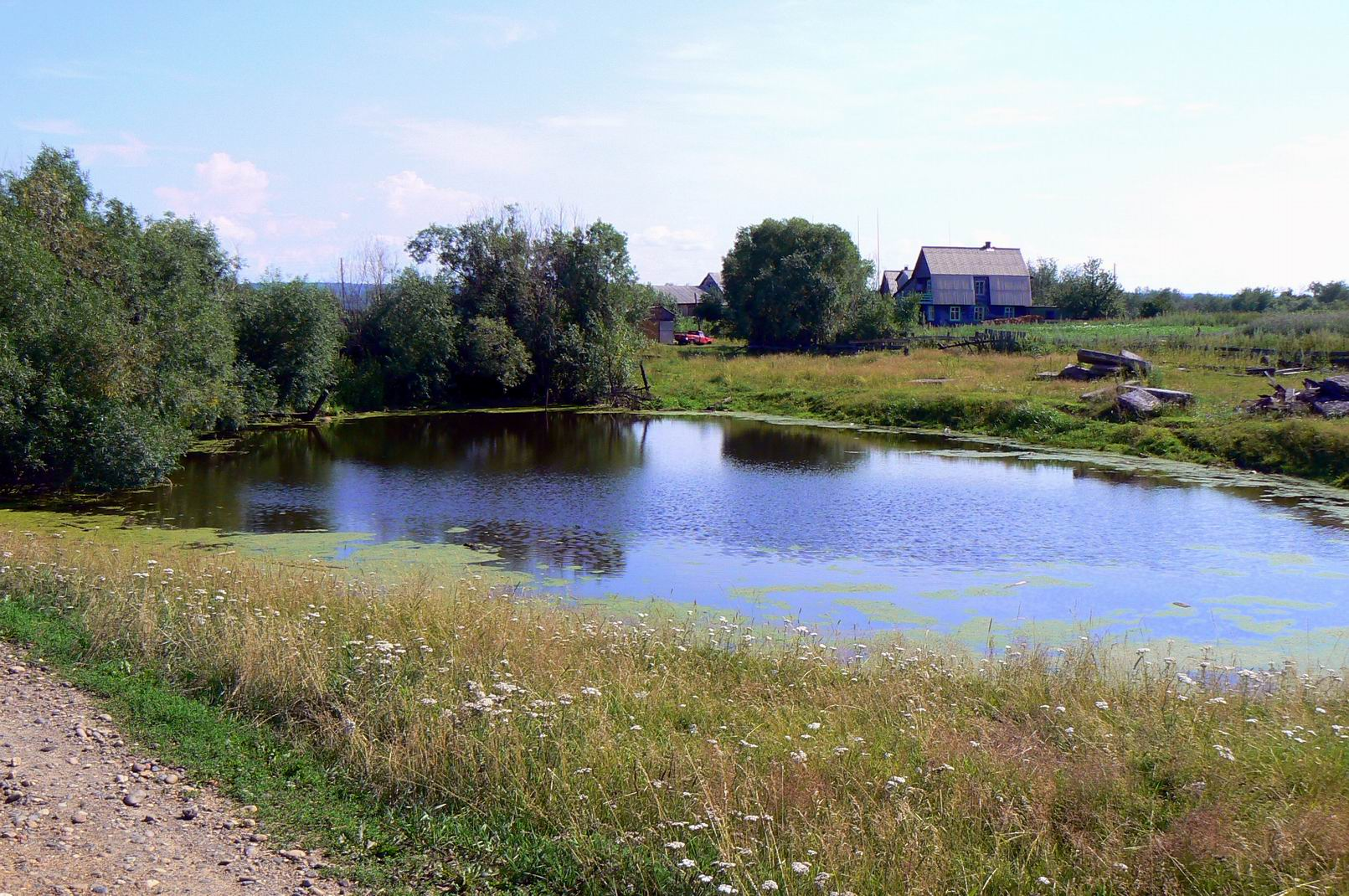
- Landscape in Yartsevsky District

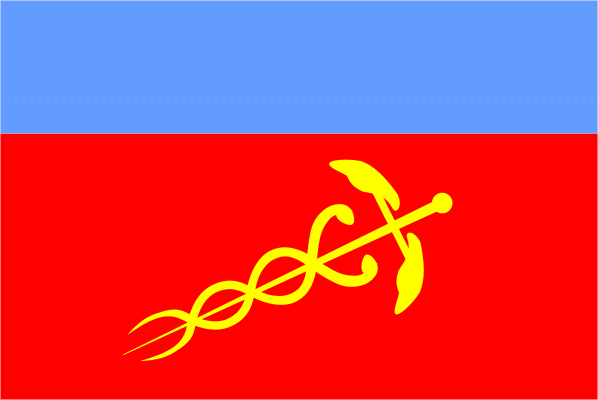
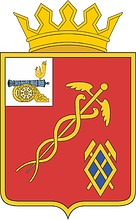
- Flag Coat of arms
- Location of Yartsevsky District in Smolensk Oblast
- Coordinates: 55°04′N 32°41′E
- Country: Russia
- Federal subject: Smolensk Oblast
- Established: 1929
- Administrative center: Yartsevo

Area
  - Total: 1,618.93 km^{2} (625.07 sq mi)

Population (2010 Census)
  - Total: 55,803
  - Density: 34.469/km^{2} (89.274/sq mi)
  - Urban: 85.7%
  - Rural: 14.3%

Administrative structure
  - Administrative divisions: 1 Urban settlements, 11 Rural settlements
  - Inhabited localities: 1 cities/towns, 115 rural localities

Municipal structure
  - Municipally incorporated as: Yartsevsky Municipal District
  - Municipal divisions: 1 urban settlements, 11 rural settlements
- Time zone: UTC+3 (MSK)
- OKTMO ID: 66658000
- Website: http://yarcevo.admin-smolensk.ru/

Yartsevsky District (Russian: Ярцевский райо́н) is an administrative and municipal district (raion), one of the twenty-five in Smolensk Oblast, Russia. It is located in the central and northern parts of the oblast. The area of the district is 1,618.93 square kilometers (625.07 sq mi). Its administrative center is the town of Yartsevo. Population: 55,803 (2010 Census); 62,012 (2002 census); 10,767 (1989 Soviet census). The population of Yartsevo accounts for 85.7% of the district's total population.
