= Vyazma constituency =

Russian legislative constituency

Vyazma single-member constituency
- Constituency of the Russian State Duma

- Constituency boundaries from 1995 to 2007
- Deputy: None
- Federal subject: Smolensk Oblast
- Districts: Desnogorsk, Dorogobuzhsky, Dukhovshchinsky, Gagarinsky, Glinkovsky, Kholm-Zhirkovsky, Novoduginsky, Roslavlsky, Safonovsky, Sychyovsky, Tyomkinsky, Ugransky, Vyazemsky, Yartsevsky, Yelninsky, Yershichsky
- Voters: 413,730 (2003)

The Vyazma constituency (No.168 (Note: No.167 in 1993-1995)) was a Russian legislative constituency in Smolensk Oblast in 1993–2007. It was based in rural central and eastern Smolensk Oblast. The seat was last occupied by United Russia deputy Viktor Derenkovsky, a businessman, who won the open-seat race in the 2003 election.

The constituency was dissolved in 2007 when State Duma adopted full proportional representation for the next two electoral cycles. Vyazma constituency was not re-established for the 2016 election, currently its former territory is split between Smolensk constituency (northern part) and Roslavl constituency (southern part).

== Boundaries ==
1993–1995: Desnogorsk, Dorogobuzhsky District, Dukhovshchinsky District, Gagarin, Gagarinsky District, Glinkovsky District, Kholm-Zhirkovsky District, Novoduginsky District, Roslavl, Roslavlsky District, Safonovo, Safonovsky District, Sychyovsky District, Tyomkinsky District, Ugransky District, Vyazemsky District, Vyazma, Yartsevo, Yartsevsky District, Yelninsky District
The constituency covered rural eastern and central Smolensk Oblast, including the towns of Desnogorsk, Gagarin, Roslavl, Safonovo, Vyazma and Yartsevo.

1995–2007: Desnogorsk, Dorogobuzhsky District, Dukhovshchinsky District, Gagarin, Gagarinsky District, Glinkovsky District, Kholm-Zhirkovsky District, Novoduginsky District, Roslavl, Roslavlsky District, Safonovo, Safonovsky District, Sychyovsky District, Tyomkinsky District, Ugransky District, Vyazemsky District, Vyazma, Yartsevo, Yartsevsky District, Yelninsky District, Yershichsky District
After 1995 redistricting the constituency retained all of its former territory and gained rural Yershichsky District at the southern tip of Smolensk Oblast from Smolensk constituency.

== Members elected ==
Election	Member	Party
1993	Vyacheslav Balalayev	Agrarian Party
1995	Dmitry Abramenkov	Communist Party
1999	Dmitry Abramenkov	Communist Party
2003	Viktor Derenkovsky	United Russia

== Election results ==
=== 1993 ===
==== Declared candidates ====
- Vyacheslav Balalayev (APR), agriculture executive
- Sergey Semkin (Civic Union), chief engineer of the Moscow Railway Smolensk division
- Vladimir Vladimirov (DPR), union organizer
- Vladimir Yermolenko (Kedr), economist
- Vladimir Zharikhin (BR–NI), public relations department head at People's Party "Free Russia" executive committee

==== Results ====
Summary of the 12 December 1993 Russian legislative election in the Vyazma constituency
Candidate	Party	Votes	%
Vyacheslav Balalayev	Agrarian Party	100,503	38.19%
Sergey Semkin	Civic Union	–	12.70%
Vladimir Vladimirov	Democratic Party	–	–
Vladimir Yermolenko	Kedr	–	–
Vladimir Zharikhin	Future of Russia–New Names	–	–
Total		263,154	100%

=== 1995 ===
==== Declared candidates ====
- Dmitry Abramenkov (CPRF), expert technician at Roslavl railway vocational college
- Natalya Argonova (Forward, Russia!), teaching methodologist
- Vyacheslav Balalayev (APR), incumbent Member of State Duma (1994–present)
- Inna Demidova (Independent), Chairwoman of the Vyazemsky District Committee on Youth (previously ran as NDR candidate)
- Aleksandr Grinkevich (BIR), former First Secretary of the CPSU Gagarin City Committee (1989–1991)
- Vladimir Koloskov (Independent), motel worker
- Aleksandr Kozyrev (LDPR), Member of State Duma (1994–present)
- Valery Latyshev (NRPR), party secretary in Vyazma
- Vladimir Novikov (DVR–OD), Smolensk State Pedagogical Institute associate professor
- Ivan Popkov (KhDS–KhS), Bible Society in Russia regional manager
- Andrey Serdyukov (Independent), senior state forestry inspector
- Anatoly Sokol (Independent), chief doctor of the diamond factory polyclinic
- Sergey Stepanov (SK), first secretary of the Union of Communists central committee (1993–present)
- Aleksandr Zhidkov (Independent), beekeeper

==== Results ====
Summary of the 17 December 1995 Russian legislative election in the Vyazma constituency
Candidate	Party	Votes	%
Dmitry Abramenkov	Communist Party	76,038	26.04%
Aleksandr Kozyrev	Liberal Democratic Party	48,902	16.75%
Vyacheslav Balalayev (incumbent)	Agrarian Party	45,134	15.46%
Vladimir Novikov	Democratic Choice of Russia – United Democrats	15,997	5.48%
Sergey Stepanov	Union of Communists	11,496	3.94%
Inna Demidova	Independent	10,682	3.66%
Anatoly Sokol	Congress of Russian Communities	9,711	3.33%
Valery Latyshev	National Republican Party	9,596	3.29%
Aleksandr Grinkevich	Ivan Rybkin Bloc	8,081	2.77%
Natalya Argonova	Forward, Russia!	7,725	2.65%
Andrey Serdyukov	Independent	5,958	2.04%
Aleksandr Zhidkov	Independent	5,025	1.72%
Ivan Popkov	Christian-Democratic Union - Christians of Russia	4,500	1.54%
Vladimir Koloskov	Independent	2,885	0.99%
against all		25,173	8.62%
Total		291,953	100%

=== 1999 ===
==== Declared candidates ====
- Dmitry Abramenkov (CPRF), incumbent Member of State Duma (1996–present)
- Andrey Antipov (Independent), consultant to the State Duma Committee on Defense
- Viktor Derenkovsky (Independent), agriculture businessman
- Viktor Goryainov (DN), journalist
- Boris Khaytovich (Independent), businessman
- Mikhail Khvostantsev (SPS), Deputy Governor of Smolensk Oblast (1998–1999)
- Vladimir Kishenin (Independent), IT businessman
- Vladimir Komarov (Independent), Rosenergoatom executive, former chief engineer of the Chernobyl Nuclear Power Plant (1986–1989)
- Leonid Kravchenko (Independent), former Chairman of the State Committee of Television and Radio Broadcasting of the Soviet Union (1990–1991)
- Nikolay Pavlov (ROS), former People's Deputy of Russia (1990–1993)
- Aleksey Ryabchenko (LDPR), chief sanitary doctor of Dukhovshchinsky District
- Aleksandr Stepanov (Independent), businessman

==== Failed to qualify ====
- Yury Korytko (Independent)
- Nikolay Molokanov (Independent), dentist

==== Did not file ====
- Mikhail Loginov (NDR), First Deputy Head of Administration of Ugransky District
- Nikolay Petrov (Independent)
- Igor Polupanov (Nikolayev–Fyodorov Bloc), retired Air Defense Forces lieutenant general
- Nikolay Rudchenko (Independent)
- Sergey Stepanov (Independent), first secretary of the Union of Communists central committee (1993–present), 1995 candidate for this seat
- Anatoly Sukharev (Independent)

==== Results ====
Summary of the 19 December 1999 Russian legislative election in the Vyazma constituency
Candidate	Party	Votes	%
Dmitry Abramenkov (incumbent)	Communist Party	59,728	24.11%
Viktor Derenkovsky	Independent	53,278	21.50%
Vladimir Kishenin	Independent	30,842	12.45%
Leonid Kravchenko	Independent	18,953	7.65%
Mikhail Khvostantsev	Union of Right Forces	15,844	6.39%
Nikolay Pavlov	Russian All-People's Union	15,469	6.24%
Aleksey Ryabchenko	Liberal Democratic Party	6,100	2.46%
Andrey Antipov	Independent	6,046	2.44%
Vladimir Komarov	Independent	4,050	1.63%
Viktor Goryainov	Spiritual Heritage	2,223	0.90%
Boris Khaytovich	Independent	1,787	0.72%
Aleksandr Stepanov	Independent	1,354	0.55%
against all		28,692	11.58%
Total		247,759	100%

=== 2003 ===
==== Declared candidates ====
- Viktor Akimov (NPRF), chairman of the regional consumers union
- Vladimir Beryozov (CPRF), former Senator from Smolensk Oblast (2002)
- Viktor Dedkov (Yabloko), agriculture businessman
- Viktor Derenkovsky (United Russia), agriculture businessman, 1999 candidate for this seat
- Vladimir Kishenin (RPP-PSS), chairman of the Party of Social Justice (2003–present), IT businessman, 1999 candidate for this seat
- Oleg Kosmachev (ORP Rus'), security guard
- Aleksey Ryabchenko (LDPR), chief sanitary doctor of Dukhovshchinsky District, 1999 candidate for this seat
- Sergey Stepanov (Independent), first secretary of the Union of Communists central committee (1993–present), 1995 and 1999 candidate for this seat

==== Failed to qualify ====
- Aleksandr Belkin (PME), lawyer

==== Did not file ====
- Vladimir Mikheyev (Independent), unemployed
- Viktor Vlasov (SPS), Deputy Head of Administration of Dorogobuzhsky District

==== Declined ====
- Dmitry Abramenkov (CPRF), incumbent Member of State Duma (1996–present)

==== Results ====
Summary of the 7 December 2003 Russian legislative election in the Vyazma constituency
Candidate	Party	Votes	%
Viktor Derenkovsky	United Russia	78,453	36.92%
Vladimir Kishenin	Russian Pensioners' Party-Party of Social Justice	43,260	20.36%
Vladimir Beryozov	Communist Party	30,017	14.13%
Viktor Akimov	People's Party	7,879	3.71%
Viktor Dedkov	Yabloko	7,646	3.60%
Aleksey Ryabchenko	Liberal Democratic Party	7,141	3.36%
Sergey Stepanov	Independent	3,719	1.75%
Oleg Kosmachev	United Russian Party Rus'	2,614	1.23%
against all		28,082	13.22%
Total		212,491	100%
