= Seltso (inhabited locality) =

Seltso (Russian: Сельцо) is the name of several inhabited localities in Russia.

== Modern localities ==
=== Arkhangelsk Oblast ===
As of 2014, one rural locality in Arkhangelsk Oblast bears this name:

Arkhangelsk Oblast location map
Location of Seltso in Arkhangelsk Oblast

- Seltso, Arkhangelsk Oblast, a village in Zaostrovsky Selsoviet of Vinogradovsky District; 62°29′N 43°47′E

=== Bryansk Oblast ===
As of 2014, five inhabited localities in Bryansk Oblast bear this name:

Bryansk Oblast distribution map
Distribution of the inhabited localities called Seltso in Bryansk Oblast.

Urban localities

- Seltso, a town under the administrative jurisdiction of Seltsovsky Urban Administrative Okrug (city of oblast significance); 53°22′N 34°06′E

Rural localities

- Seltso, Bryansky District, Bryansk Oblast, a village in Glinishchevsky Rural Administrative Okrug of Bryansky District; 53°21′N 34°05′E
- Seltso, Dyatkovsky District, Bryansk Oblast, a village under the administrative jurisdiction of Ivotsky Settlement Administrative Okrug in Dyatkovsky District; 53°44′N 34°04′E
- Seltso, Kletnyansky District, Bryansk Oblast, a village in Nadvinsky Rural Administrative Okrug of Kletnyansky District; 53°31′N 33°15′E
- Seltso, Rognedinsky District, Bryansk Oblast, a village in Fedorovsky Rural Administrative Okrug of Rognedinsky District; 53°56′N 33°33′E

=== Ivanovo Oblast ===
As of 2014, three rural localities in Ivanovo Oblast bear this name:

Ivanovo Oblast distribution map
Distribution of the inhabited localities called Seltso in Ivanovo Oblast.

- Seltso, Savinsky District, Ivanovo Oblast, a village in Savinsky District; 56°33′N 41°02′E
- Seltso, Vichugsky District, Ivanovo Oblast, a village in Vichugsky District; 57°10′N 42°20′E
- Seltso, Yuryevetsky District, Ivanovo Oblast, a village in Yuryevetsky District; 57°24′N 42°48′E

=== Kaluga Oblast ===
As of 2014, two rural localities in Kaluga Oblast bear this name:

- Seltso, Baryatinsky District, Kaluga Oblast, a village in Baryatinsky District
- Seltso, Mosalsky District, Kaluga Oblast, a village in Mosalsky District

=== Kostroma Oblast ===
As of 2014, two rural localities in Kostroma Oblast bear this name:

Kostroma Oblast distribution map
Distribution of the inhabited localities called Seltso in Kostroma Oblast.

- Seltso, Kostromskoy District, Kostroma Oblast, a village in Samsonovskoye Settlement of Kostromskoy District; 57°39′N 40°59′E
- Seltso, Sudislavsky District, Kostroma Oblast, a village in Voronskoye Settlement of Sudislavsky District; 58°06′N 42°02′E

=== Leningrad Oblast ===
As of 2014, four rural localities in Leningrad Oblast bear this name:

Leningrad Oblast distribution map
Distribution of the inhabited localities called Seltso in Leningrad Oblast.

- Seltso, Tikhvinsky District, Leningrad Oblast, a village in Shugozerskoye Settlement Municipal Formation of Tikhvinsky District; 59°57′N 34°13′E
- Seltso, Tosnensky District, Leningrad Oblast, a settlement under the administrative jurisdiction of Lyubanskoye Settlement Municipal Formation in Tosnensky District; 59°20′N 31°13′E
- Seltso (settlement), Seltsovskoye Settlement Municipal Formation, Volosovsky District, Leningrad Oblast, a settlement in Seltsovskoye Settlement Municipal Formation of Volosovsky District; 59°38′N 29°32′E
- Seltso (village), Seltsovskoye Settlement Municipal Formation, Volosovsky District, Leningrad Oblast, a village in Seltsovskoye Settlement Municipal Formation of Volosovsky District; 59°36′N 29°32′E

=== Moscow Oblast ===
As of 2014, two rural localities in Moscow Oblast bear this name:

Moscow Oblast distribution map
Distribution of the inhabited localities called Seltso in Moscow Oblast.

- Seltso, Konstantinovskoye Rural Settlement, Ramensky District, Moscow Oblast, a village in Konstantinovskoye Rural Settlement of Ramensky District; 55°25′N 38°10′E
- Seltso, Ostrovetskoye Rural Settlement, Ramensky District, Moscow Oblast, a village in Ostrovetskoye Rural Settlement of Ramensky District; 55°34′N 38°01′E

=== Nizhny Novgorod Oblast ===
As of 2014, one rural locality in Nizhny Novgorod Oblast bears this name:

Nizhny Novgorod Oblast location map
Location of Seltso in Nizhny Novgorod Oblast

- Seltso, Nizhny Novgorod Oblast, a village in Nikolo-Pogostinsky Selsoviet of Gorodetsky District; 56°33′N 43°36′E

=== Novgorod Oblast ===
As of 2014, nine rural localities in Novgorod Oblast bear this name:

- Seltso, Batetsky District, Novgorod Oblast, a village in Batetskoye Settlement of Batetsky District
- Seltso, Kholmsky District, Novgorod Oblast, a village in Togodskoye Settlement of Kholmsky District
- Seltso, Moshenskoy District, Novgorod Oblast, a village in Kirovskoye Settlement of Moshenskoy District
- Seltso, Novgorodsky District, Novgorod Oblast, a village in Borkovskoye Settlement of Novgorodsky District
- Seltso, Fedorkovskoye Settlement, Parfinsky District, Novgorod Oblast, a village in Fedorkovskoye Settlement of Parfinsky District
- Seltso, Polavskoye Settlement, Parfinsky District, Novgorod Oblast, a village in Polavskoye Settlement of Parfinsky District
- Seltso, Soletsky District, Novgorod Oblast, a village in Dubrovskoye Settlement of Soletsky District
- Seltso, Gorskoye Settlement, Volotovsky District, Novgorod Oblast, a village in Gorskoye Settlement of Volotovsky District
- Seltso, Slavitinskoye Settlement, Volotovsky District, Novgorod Oblast, a village in Slavitinskoye Settlement of Volotovsky District

=== Pskov Oblast ===
As of 2014, three rural localities in Pskov Oblast bear this name:

- Seltso, Dedovichsky District, Pskov Oblast, a village in Dedovichsky District
- Seltso, Loknyansky District, Pskov Oblast, a village in Loknyansky District
- Seltso, Pskovsky District, Pskov Oblast, a village in Pskovsky District

=== Smolensk Oblast ===
As of 2014, twelve rural localities in Smolensk Oblast bear this name:

- Seltso, Demidovsky District, Smolensk Oblast, a village in Zhichitskoye Rural Settlement of Demidovsky District
- Seltso, Dukhovshchinsky District, Smolensk Oblast, a village in Prechistenskoye Rural Settlement of Dukhovshchinsky District
- Seltso, Gagarinsky District, Smolensk Oblast, a village in Nikolskoye Rural Settlement of Gagarinsky District
- Seltso, Kholm-Zhirkovsky District, Smolensk Oblast, a village under the administrative jurisdiction of Kholm-Zhirkovskoye Urban Settlement in Kholm-Zhirkovsky District
- Seltso, Novoduginsky District, Smolensk Oblast, a village in Dneprovskoye Rural Settlement of Novoduginsky District
- Seltso, Pochinkovsky District, Smolensk Oblast, a village in Leninskoye Rural Settlement of Pochinkovsky District
- Seltso, Rudnyansky District, Smolensk Oblast, a village in Klyarinovskoye Rural Settlement of Rudnyansky District
- Seltso, Safonovsky District, Smolensk Oblast, a village in Baranovskoye Rural Settlement of Safonovsky District
- Seltso, Tyomkinsky District, Smolensk Oblast, a village in Kikinskoye Rural Settlement of Tyomkinsky District
- Seltso, Ugransky District, Smolensk Oblast, a village in Rusanovskoye Rural Settlement of Ugransky District
- Seltso, Vyazemsky District, Smolensk Oblast, a village in Polyanovskoye Rural Settlement of Vyazemsky District
- Seltso, Yartsevsky District, Smolensk Oblast, a village in Podroshchinskoye Rural Settlement of Yartsevsky District

=== Tver Oblast ===
As of 2014, six rural localities in Tver Oblast bear this name:

- Seltso, Bezhetsky District, Tver Oblast, a village in Filippkovskoye Rural Settlement of Bezhetsky District
- Seltso, Kalininsky District, Tver Oblast, a village in Krasnogorskoye Rural Settlement of Kalininsky District
- Seltso, Rameshkovsky District, Tver Oblast, a village in Ilgoshchi Rural Settlement of Rameshkovsky District
- Seltso, Staritsky District, Tver Oblast, a village in Novo-Yamskoye Rural Settlement of Staritsky District
- Seltso, Maryinskoye Rural Settlement, Torzhoksky District, Tver Oblast, a village in Maryinskoye Rural Settlement of Torzhoksky District
- Seltso, Ostashkovskoye Rural Settlement, Torzhoksky District, Tver Oblast, a village in Ostashkovskoye Rural Settlement of Torzhoksky District

=== Vladimir Oblast ===
As of 2014, four rural localities in Vladimir Oblast bear this name:

- Seltso, Gorokhovetsky District, Vladimir Oblast, a village in Gorokhovetsky District
- Seltso, Kovrovsky District, Vladimir Oblast, a village in Kovrovsky District
- Seltso, Muromsky District, Vladimir Oblast, a village in Muromsky District
- Seltso, Suzdalsky District, Vladimir Oblast, a selo in Suzdalsky District

=== Vologda Oblast ===
As of 2014, five rural localities in Vologda Oblast bear this name:

- Seltso, Shchetinsky Selsoviet, Cherepovetsky District, Vologda Oblast, a village in Shchetinsky Selsoviet of Cherepovetsky District
- Seltso, Telepshinsky Selsoviet, Cherepovetsky District, Vologda Oblast, a village in Telepshinsky Selsoviet of Cherepovetsky District
- Seltso, Sheksninsky District, Vologda Oblast, a village in Domshinsky Selsoviet of Sheksninsky District
- Seltso, Sokolsky District, Vologda Oblast, a village in Prigorodny Selsoviet of Sokolsky District
- Seltso, Ustyuzhensky District, Vologda Oblast, a village in Podolsky Selsoviet of Ustyuzhensky District

=== Yaroslavl Oblast ===
As of 2014, nine rural localities in Yaroslavl Oblast bear this name:

- Seltso, Bolsheselsky District, Yaroslavl Oblast, a village in Bolsheselsky Rural Okrug of Bolsheselsky District
- Seltso, Lyubimsky District, Yaroslavl Oblast, a village in Voskresensky Rural Okrug of Lyubimsky District
- Seltso, Rostovsky District, Yaroslavl Oblast, a selo in Sulostsky Rural Okrug of Rostovsky District
- Seltso, Lomovsky Rural Okrug, Rybinsky District, Yaroslavl Oblast, a village in Lomovsky Rural Okrug of Rybinsky District
- Seltso, Nazarovsky Rural Okrug, Rybinsky District, Yaroslavl Oblast, a village in Nazarovsky Rural Okrug of Rybinsky District
- Seltso, Nikolo-Edomsky Rural Okrug, Tutayevsky District, Yaroslavl Oblast, a village in Nikolo-Edomsky Rural Okrug of Tutayevsky District
- Seltso, Pomogalovsky Rural Okrug, Tutayevsky District, Yaroslavl Oblast, a village in Pomogalovsky Rural Okrug of Tutayevsky District
- Seltso, Uglichsky District, Yaroslavl Oblast, a village in Maymersky Rural Okrug of Uglichsky District
- Seltso, Yaroslavsky District, Yaroslavl Oblast, a village in Tochishchensky Rural Okrug of Yaroslavsky District

== Alternative names ==
- Seltso, alternative name of Pogost, a village in Seletsky Selsoviet of Kholmogorsky District in Arkhangelsk Oblast; 63°19′N 41°24′E
- Seltso, alternative name of Seltso-Rudnoye, a village in Ovstugsky Rural Administrative Okrug of Zhukovsky District in Bryansk Oblast; 53°24′N 33°51′E
