= Smolensk constituency =

Legislative constituency in Russia

Smolensk single-member constituency
- Constituency of the Russian State Duma
- Deputy: Alexander Babakov; A Just Russia
- Federal subject: Smolensk Oblast
- Districts: Demidovsky, Desnogorsk, Dorogobuzhsky, Dukhovshchinsky, Gagarinsky, Glinkovsky, Kardymovsky, Khislavichsky, Kholm-Zhirkovsky, Krasninsky, Monastyrshchinsky, Novoduginsky, Pochinkovsky, Roslavlsky, Rudnyansky, Safonovsky, Shumyachsky, Smolensk, Smolensky, Sychyovsky, Tyomkinsky, Ugransky, Velizhsky, Vyazemsky, Yartsevsky, Yelninsky, Yershichsky
- Voters: 712,483 (2026)

The Smolensk constituency (No.176 (Note: No.168 in 1993-1995, No.169 in 1995-2007, No.175 in 2016–2026)) is a Russian legislative constituency in Smolensk Oblast. The constituency covers the entire territory of Smolensk Oblast.

The constituency has been represented since 2026 by A Just Russia deputy Alexander Babakov, five-term State Duma member and Deputy Chairman of the State Duma. Prior six-term United Russia incumbent Sergey Neverov withdrew from the primary, while one-term Liberal Democratic incumbent Sergey Leonov, who was redistricted from the Roslavl constituency, unsuccessfully sought re-election on the party list.

== Boundaries ==
1993–1995: Demidovsky District, Kardymovsky District, Khislavichsky District, Krasninsky District, Monastyrshchinsky District, Pochinkovsky District, Rudnyansky District, Shumyachsky District, Smolensk, Smolensky District, Velizhsky District, Yershichsky District
The constituency covered the oblast capital Smolensk and western Smolensk Oblast.

1995–2007: Demidovsky District, Kardymovsky District, Khislavichsky District, Krasninsky District, Monastyrshchinsky District, Pochinkovsky District, Rudnyansky District, Shumyachsky District, Smolensk, Smolensky District, Velizhsky District
After 1995 redistricting the constituency was slightly altered, losing rural Yershichsky District at the southern tip of Smolensk Oblast to Vyazma constituency.

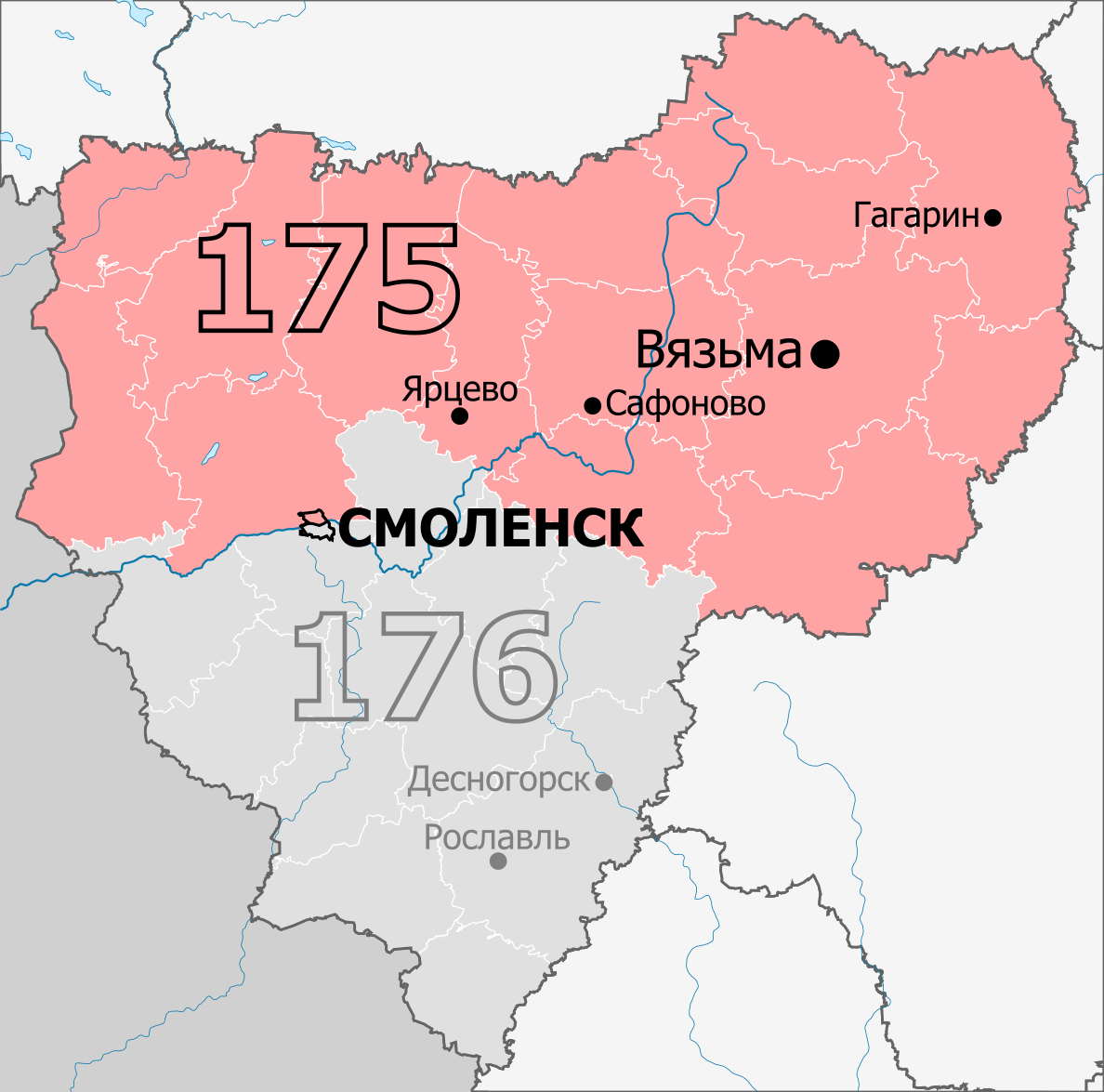
Constituency boundaries from 2016 to 2026

2016–2026: Demidovsky District, Dorogobuzhsky District, Dukhovshchinsky District, Gagarinsky District, Kholm-Zhirkovsky District, Novoduginsky District, Rudnyansky District, Safonovsky District, Smolensk (Zadneprovsky), Smolensky District (Divasovskoye, Gnezdovskoye, Kasplyanskoye, Katynskoye, Korokhotkinskoye, Loinskoye, Novoselskoye, Pecherskoye, Smetaninskoye, Stabenskoye, Volokovskoye, Vyazginskoye), Sychyovsky District, Tyomkinsky District, Ugransky District, Velizhsky District, Vyazemsky District, Yartsevsky District
The constituency was re-created for the 2016 election and retained only Zadneprovsky City District of Smolensk and north-western corner of Smolensk Oblast, losing the rest to new Roslavl constituency. This seat instead gained north-eastern Smolensk Oblast from the dissolved Vyazma constituency.

2026–present: Demidovsky District, Desnogorsk, Dorogobuzhsky District, Dukhovshchinsky District, Gagarinsky District, Glinkovsky District, Kardymovsky District, Khislavichsky District, Kholm-Zhirkovsky District, Krasninsky District, Monastyrshchinsky District, Novoduginsky District, Pochinkovsky District, Roslavlsky District, Rudnyansky District, Safonovsky District, Shumyachsky District, Smolensk, Smolensky District, Sychyovsky District, Tyomkinsky District, Ugransky District, Velizhsky District, Vyazemsky District, Yartsevsky District, Yelninsky District, Yershichsky District
After the 2025 redistricting Smolensk Oblast lost one of its two constituencies, so both Smolensk and Roslavl constituencies were merged into a single constituency, covering the entirety of Smolensk Oblast.

== Members elected ==
Election	Member	Party
1993	Anatoly Lukyanov	Communist Party
1995	Anatoly Lukyanov	Communist Party
1999	Anatoly Lukyanov	Communist Party
2003	Sergey Antufyev	United Russia
2007	Proportional representation - no election by constituency	
2011	Proportional representation - no election by constituency	
2016	Sergey Neverov	United Russia
2021	Sergey Neverov	United Russia
2026	Alexander Babakov	A Just Russia

== Election results ==
=== 1993 ===
Summary of the 12 December 1993 Russian legislative election in the Smolensk constituency
Candidate	Party	Votes	%
Anatoly Lukyanov	Communist Party	102,477	34.56%
Aleksandr Ignatenkov	Agrarian Party	–	17.10%
Aleksandr Bobrov	Future of Russia–New Names	–	–
Gennady Kosenkov	Democratic Party	–	–
Sergey Novikov	Independent	–	–
Aleksandr Prokhorov	Civic Union	–	–
Anatoly Savin	Independent	–	–
Total		296,562	100%

=== 1995 ===
Summary of the 17 December 1995 Russian legislative election in the Smolensk constituency
Candidate	Party	Votes	%
Anatoly Lukyanov (incumbent)	Communist Party	116,848	37.27%
Sergey Zhamoydo	Liberal Democratic Party	50,226	16.02%
Gennady Danilov	Democratic Choice of Russia – United Democrats	20,984	6.69%
Vasily Litvinov	Independent	16,689	5.32%
Boris Parfenov	Yabloko	13,547	4.32%
Aleksandr Plyaskin	Independent	13,155	4.20%
Vitaly Shvedov	Congress of Russian Communities	10,301	3.29%
Aleksandr Zimin	Independent	9,105	2.90%
Stanislav Dmitrachkov	Trade Unions and Industrialists – Union of Labour	5,482	1.75%
Aleksandr Belyakov	Independent	4,767	1.52%
Viktor Smirnov	Independent	4,336	1.38%
Sergey Krivko	Independent	3,893	1.24%
Aleksandr Popov	Independent	3,490	1.11%
Vladimir Pekarev	Christian-Democratic Union - Christians of Russia	3,290	1.05%
Aleksandr Golubev	Social Democrats	2,007	0.64%
against all		29,672	9.46%
Total		313,501	100%

=== 1999 ===
Summary of the 19 December 1999 Russian legislative election in the Smolensk constituency
Candidate	Party	Votes	%
Anatoly Lukyanov (incumbent)	Communist Party	85,178	32.00%
Yevgeny Kamanin	Yabloko	59,264	22.27%
Sergey Kolesnikov	Independent	50,428	18.95%
Viktor Grisin	Party of Pensioners	9,855	3.70%
Sergey Shepelev	Liberal Democratic Party	9,458	3.55%
Vladimir Zaytsev	Spiritual Heritage	5,967	2.24%
Eduard Baltin	Independent	5,555	2.09%
Yury Grigoryev	Congress of Russian Communities-Yury Boldyrev Movement	4,763	1.79%
Yury Zheribor	Kedr	4,183	1.57%
against all		27,576	10.36%
Total		266,152	100%

=== 2003 ===
Summary of the 7 December 2003 Russian legislative election in the Smolensk constituency
Candidate	Party	Votes	%
Sergey Antufyev	United Russia	98,412	40.07%
Anatoly Lukyanov (incumbent)	Communist Party	36,980	15.06%
Sergey Maslakov	Independent	25,883	10.54%
Svetlana Korzhova	Liberal Democratic Party	17,174	6.99%
Aleksandr Ignatenkov	Agrarian Party	13,452	5.48%
Boris Parfenov	Yabloko	5,702	2.32%
Igor Yukhimenko	Union of Right Forces	5,247	2.14%
Mikhail Grigoryev	United Russian Party Rus'	2,100	0.86%
Sergey Fomchenkov	Independent	2,007	0.82%
against all		33,058	13.46%
Total		245,939	100%

=== 2016 ===
Summary of the 18 September 2016 Russian legislative election in the Smolensk constituency
Candidate	Party	Votes	%
Sergey Neverov	United Russia	98,039	56.64%
Aleksandr Gerasenkov	Liberal Democratic Party	23,123	13.36%
Aleksandr Stepchenkov	Communist Party	20,126	11.63%
Mikhail Atroshchenkov	A Just Russia	7,855	4.54%
Oleg Aksenov	Patriots of Russia	6,983	4.03%
Vladimir Stefantsov	Communists of Russia	3,571	2.06%
Oleg Petrikov	Rodina	2,573	1.49%
Yevgeny Dorosevich	The Greens	2,196	1.27%
Yury Poskannoy	Yabloko	1,761	1.02%
Roman Shisterov	Party of Growth	1,587	0.92%
Total		173,072	100%

=== 2021 ===
Summary of the 17-19 September 2021 Russian legislative election in the Smolensk constituency
Candidate	Party	Votes	%
Sergey Neverov (incumbent)	United Russia	90,608	52.98%
Oleg Kopyl	Communist Party	23,613	13.81%
Andrey Ivanov	A Just Russia — For Truth	13,243	7.74%
Mikhail Kovalev	Liberal Democratic Party	10,273	6.01%
Viktor Kozyrev	Communists of Russia	10,232	5.98%
Vladimir Shunin	Party of Pensioners	6,687	3.91%
Aleksandra Bichashvili	New People	6,611	3.87%
Larisa Dolzhikova	Yabloko	3,641	2.13%
Total		171,039	100%

=== 2026 ===
Summary of the 18-20 September 2026 Russian legislative election in the Smolensk constituency
Candidate	Party	Votes	%
Alexander Babakov	A Just Russia	214,846	49.61%
Sergey Yakimov	United Russia	74,972	17.31%
Stepan Yemelyanov	Communist Party	51,277	11.84%
Aleksey Voytov	New People	34,580	7.98%
Mikhail Kovalev	Liberal Democratic Party	31,607	7.30%
Darya Shavrikova	The Greens	10,348	2.39%
Ilya Ryabenkov	Rodina	6,056	1.40%
Total		433,082	100%
