= Roslavl constituency =

Legislative constituency in Russia

Roslavl single-member constituency
- Constituency of the Russian State Duma

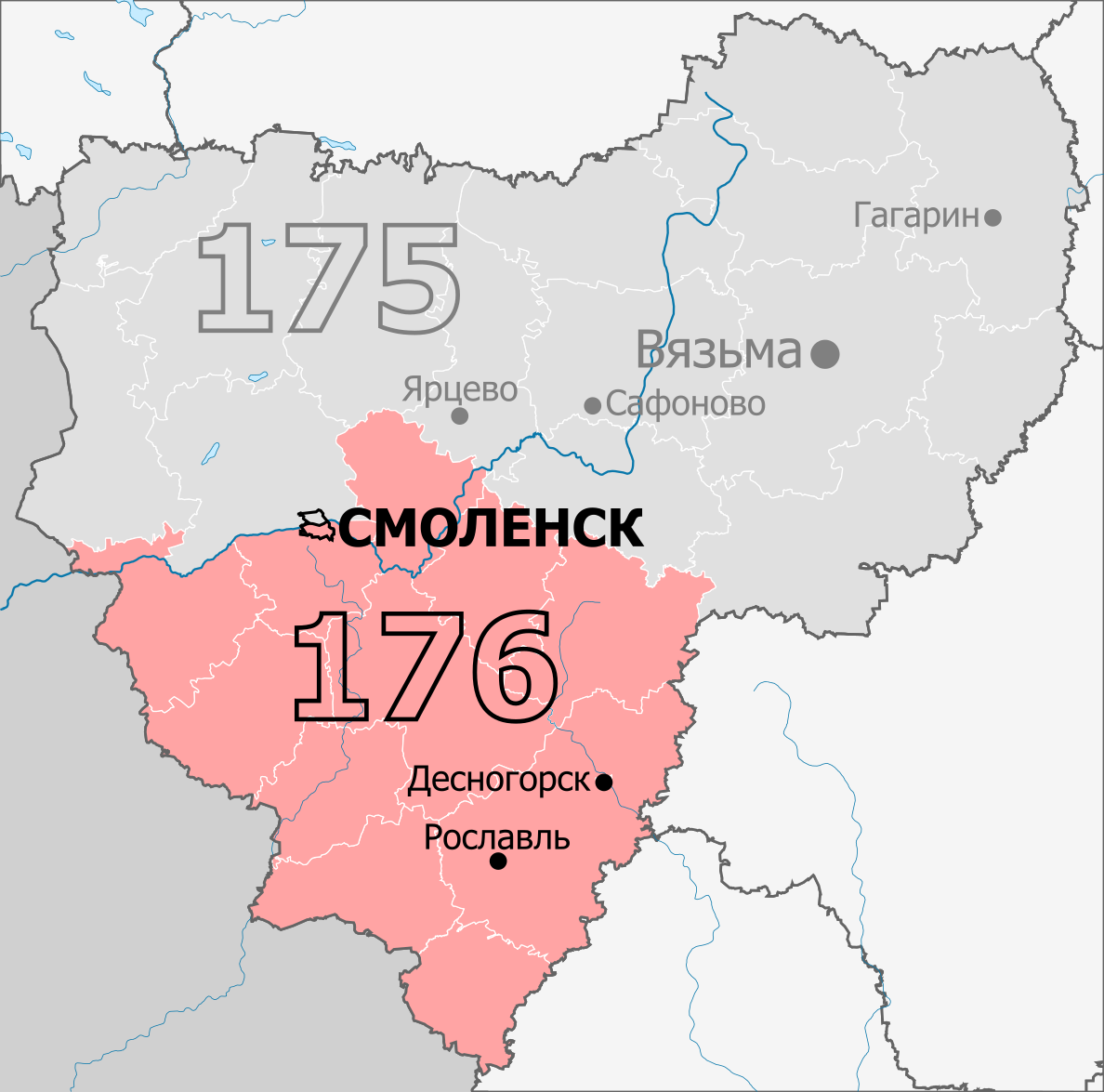
- Constituency boundaries from 2016 to 2026
- Deputy: None
- Federal subject: Smolensk Oblast
- Districts: Desnogorsk, Glinkovsky, Kardymovsky, Khislavichsky, Krasninsky, Monastyrshchinsky, Pochinkovsky, Roslavlsky, Shumyachsky, Smolensk (Leninsky, Promyshlenny), Smolensky (Koshchinskoye, Kozinskoye, Mikhnovskoye, Pionerskoye, Prigorskoye, Talashkinskoye), Yelninsky, Yershichsky
- Other territory: Israel (Haifa-1)
- Voters: 363,927 (2021)

The Roslavl constituency (No.176) was a Russian legislative constituency in Smolensk Oblast in 2016–2026. The constituency covered southern part of Smolensk and southern Smolensk Oblast. After 2025 redistricting Smolensk Oblast lost one of its two constituencies, so Roslavl constituency was dissolved and merged with Smolensk constituency.

The constituency was last represented by Liberal Democratic deputy Sergey Leonov, former Senator and 2016 candidate for this seat, who won the open seat in 2021, succeeding one-term United Russia incumbent Olga Okuneva. Leonov unsuccessfully sought re-election to the State Duma in 2026 on the LDPR party list.

== Boundaries ==
2016–2026: Desnogorsk, Glinkovsky District, Kardymovsky District, Khislavichsky District, Krasninsky District, Monastyrshchinsky District, Pochinkovsky District, Roslavlsky District, Shumyachsky District, Smolensk (Leninsky, Promyshlenny), Smolensky District (Koshchinskoye, Kozinskoye, Mikhnovskoye, Pionerskoye, Prigorskoye, Talashkinskoye), Yelninsky District, Yershichsky District
The constituency was created for the 2016 election, taking southern Smolensk and south-western Smolensk Oblast from Smolensk constituency, and south-eastern Smolensk Oblast, including Desnogorsk and Roslavl, from the dissolved Vyazma constituency.

== Members elected ==
Election	Member	Party
2016	Olga Okuneva	United Russia
2021	Sergey Leonov	Liberal Democratic Party

== Election results ==
=== 2016 ===
==== Declared candidates ====
- Sergey Alkhimov (Patriots of Russia), Member of Smolensky District Duma (2015–present), agriculture executive
- Artyom Kraynov (The Greens), homemaker
- Sergey Lebedev (A Just Russia), Member of Smolensk City Council (2005–present), former Chairman of the City Council (2005–2010), construction businessman
- Sergey Leonov (LDPR), Member of Smolensk Oblast Duma (2013–present)
- Andrey Mitrofanenkov (CPRF), Member of Yelninsky District Council of Deputies (2010–present)
- Olga Okuneva (United Russia), Deputy Governor of Smolensk Oblast (2014–present)
- Aleksey Protasov (CPCR), perennial candidate
- Sergey Revenko (Yabloko), individual entrepreneur
- Dmitry Savchenkov (Rodina), individual entrepreneur
- Pavel Yukhimenko (Party of Growth), businessman

==== Declined ====
- Aleksandr Fedulov (United Russia), director of the Moscow Power Engineering Institute, Smolensk branch (2012–present) (lost the primary)
- Aleksandr Kalugin (United Russia), Member of Smolensk Oblast Duma (2013–present), kolkhoz chairman (lost the primary)
- Artyom Malashchenkov (United Russia), Member of Smolensk Oblast Duma (2007–present) (lost the primary)
- Anatoly Mishnev (United Russia), former Senator from Smolensk Oblast (2012–2015) (lost the primary)
- Sergey Shchebetkov (United Russia), Member of Smolensk Oblast Duma (2013–present), businessman (lost the primary)
- Artem Turov (United Russia), Member of State Duma (2015–present) (lost the primary, ran on the party list)

==== Results ====
Summary of the 18 September 2016 Russian legislative election in the Roslavl constituency
Candidate	Party	Votes	%
Olga Okuneva	United Russia	67,300	45.94%
Andrey Mitrofanenkov	Communist Party	25,912	17.69%
Sergey Leonov	Liberal Democratic Party	21,081	14.39%
Sergey Lebedev	A Just Russia	12,282	8.38%
Sergey Alkhimov	Patriots of Russia	3,178	2.17%
Sergey Revenko	Yabloko	3,105	2.12%
Aleksey Protasov	Communists of Russia	2,958	2.02%
Dmitry Savchenkov	Rodina	2,499	1.71%
Pavel Yukhimenko	Party of Growth	1,630	1.11%
Artyom Kraynov	The Greens	1,497	1.02%
Total		146,492	100%

=== 2021 ===
==== Declared candidates ====
- Anna Andreyenkova (United Russia), Member of Smolensk Oblast Duma (2013–present)
- Svetlana Gorina (Party of Growth), businesswoman
- Olga Kalistratova (SR–ZP), Member of Smolensk Oblast Duma (2018–present), 2020 gubernatorial candidate
- Sergey Leonov (LDPR), Senator from Smolensk Oblast (2018–present), 2016 candidate for this seat
- Sergey Revenko (Yabloko), self-employed, 2016 candidate for this seat
- Andrey Shaposhnikov (CPRF), Member of Smolensk Oblast Duma (2018–present), aide to State Duma member Yury Afonin
- Mikhail Tsyganov (RPPSS), unemployed

==== Withdrawn candidates ====
- Aleksey Voytov (New People), food businessman

==== Declined ====
- Olga Okuneva (United Russia), incumbent Member of State Duma (2016–present) (withdrew from the primary)

==== Results ====
Summary of the 17-19 September 2021 Russian legislative election in the Roslavl constituency
Candidate	Party	Votes	%
Sergey Leonov	Liberal Democratic Party	45,519	34.56%
Andrey Shaposhnikov	Communist Party	31,375	21.90%
Anna Andreyenkova	United Russia	27,183	18.97%
Olga Kalistratova	A Just Russia — For Truth	12,757	8.90%
Mikhail Tsyganov	Party of Pensioners	8,415	5.87%
Svetlana Gorina	Party of Growth	4,245	2.96%
Sergey Revenko	Yabloko	2,603	1.82%
Total		143,293	100%
