= Safonovsky =

Safonovsky (masculine), Safonovskaya (feminine), or Safonovskoye (neuter) may refer to:

- Safonovsky District, a district of Smolensk Oblast, Russia
- Safonovskoye Urban Settlement, an administrative division and a municipal formation which the town of Safonovo in Safonovsky District of Smolensk Oblast, Russia is incorporated as
- Safonovsky (rural locality) (Safonovskaya, Safonovskoye), several rural localities in Russia
