= Tyomkino =

Tyomkino (Russian: Тёмкино) or Temkino is the name of several rural localities in Russia:

- Temkino, Kaliningrad Oblast, a settlement under the administrative jurisdiction of the town of district significance of Pravdinsk in Pravdinsky District of Kaliningrad Oblast
- Temkino, Pavlovskoye Rural Settlement, Tyomkinsky District, Smolensk Oblast, a selo in Pavlovskoye Rural Settlement of Tyomkinsky District of Smolensk Oblast
- Tyomkino, Tyomkinskoye Rural Settlement, Tyomkinsky District, Smolensk Oblast, a selo in Tyomkinskoye Rural Settlement of Tyomkinsky District of Smolensk Oblast
- Temkino, Udmurt Republic, a vyselok in Uzey-Tuklinsky Selsoviet of Uvinsky District of the Udmurt Republic
- Temkino, Vladimir Oblast, a village in Alexandrovsky District of Vladimir Oblast
