= Kholm-Zhirkovsky =

Kholm-Zhirkovsky (masculine), Kholm-Zhirkovskaya (feminine), or Kholm-Zhirkovskoye (neuter) may refer to:

- Kholm-Zhirkovsky District, a district of Smolensk Oblast, Russia
- Kholm-Zhirkovsky (urban locality), an urban locality (a settlement) in Smolensk Oblast, Russia
