= Gusino =

Gusino (Russian: Гусино) is the name of several rural localities in Russia:

- Gusino, Novgorod Oblast, a village in Ivanovskoye Settlement of Starorussky District in Novgorod Oblast
- Gusino, Pskov Oblast, a village in Pustoshkinsky District of Pskov Oblast
- Gusino (selo), Krasninsky District, Smolensk Oblast, a selo in Gusinskoye Rural Settlement of Krasninsky District in Smolensk Oblast
- Gusino (village), Krasninsky District, Smolensk Oblast, a village in Gusinskoye Rural Settlement of Krasninsky District in Smolensk Oblast
- Gusino, Smolensky District, Smolensk Oblast, a village in Katynskoye Rural Settlement of Smolensky District in Smolensk Oblast
