= Seltso (disambiguation) =

Seltso is a town in Bryansk Oblast, Russia.

Seltso may also refer to:

- Seltso (inhabited locality), several other inhabited localities in Russia
- Seltso (rural locality type), a type of rural locality in the Russian Empire and the Polish–Lithuanian Commonwealth
