= Safonovsky (rural locality) =

Safonovsky (Russian: Сафоновский; masculine), Safonovskaya (Сафоновская; feminine), or Safonovskoye (Сафоновское; neuter) is the name of several rural localities in Russia:

- Safonovsky, Oryol Oblast, a settlement in Znamensky Selsoviet of Znamensky District of Oryol Oblast
- Safonovsky, Volgograd Oblast, a khutor in Rossoshinsky Selsoviet of Uryupinsky District of Volgograd Oblast
- Safonovskaya, a village in Nizhneslobodsky Selsoviet of Vozhegodsky District of Vologda Oblast
