= Kholmogory =

Kholmogory (Russian: Холмогоры) is the name of several rural localities (selos and villages) in Russia:

- Kholmogory, Arkhangelsk Oblast, a selo in Kholmogorsky Selsoviet of Kholmogorsky District of Arkhangelsk Oblast
- Kholmogory, Republic of Bashkortostan, a village in Shabagishsky Selsoviet of Kuyurgazinsky District of the Republic of Bashkortostan
