= Sergey Neverov =

Russian politician (born 1961)

Sergey Neverov OH OF MOMF MP
- Сергей Неверов
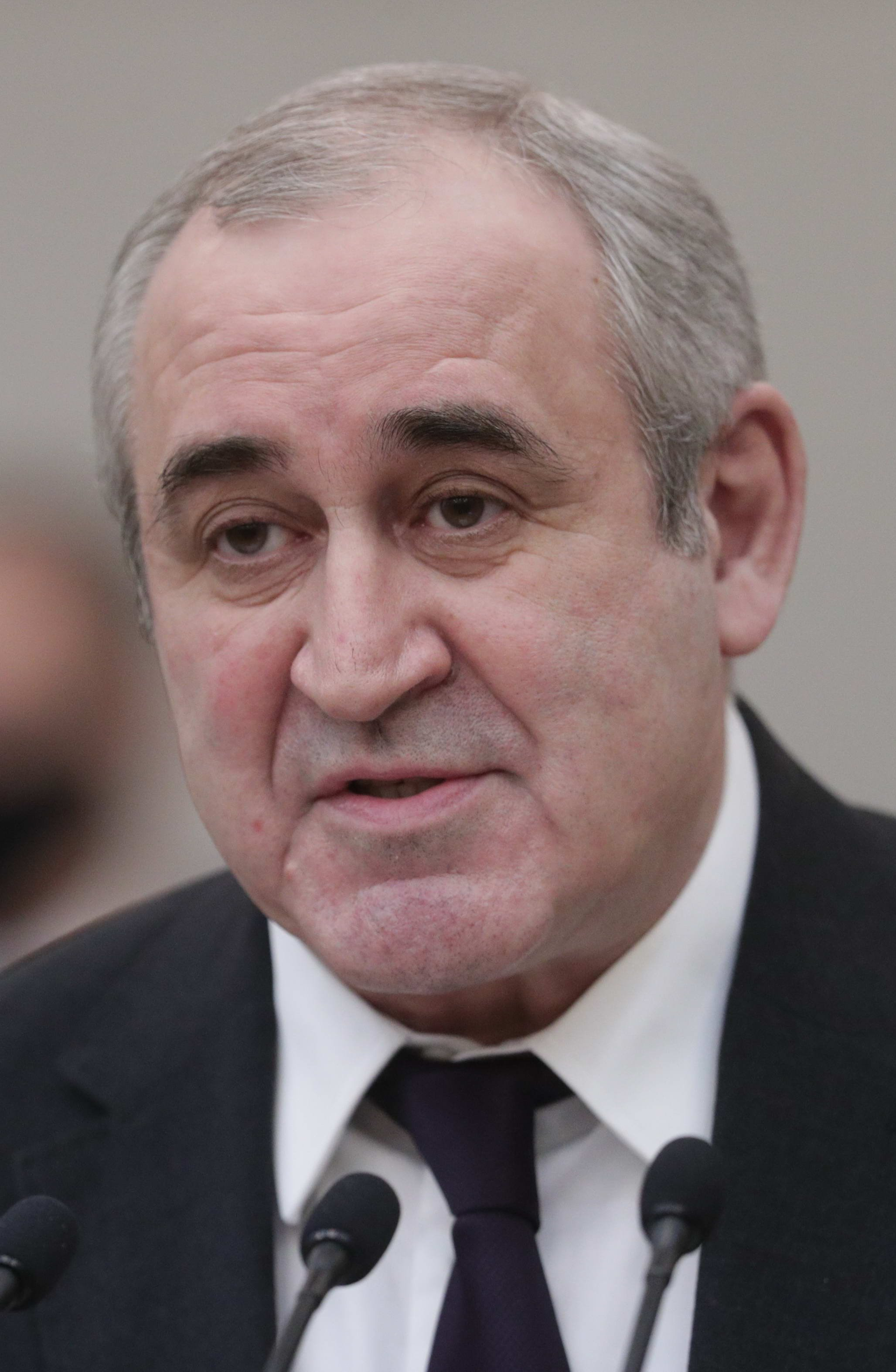
- Neverov in 2021

Parliamentary leader of United Russia in State Duma
- In office 9 October 2017 – 12 October 2021
- Preceded by: Vladimir Vasilyev
- Succeeded by: Vladimir Vasilyev

Vice Chairman of the State Duma
- In office 12 October 2021 – 23 July 2024
- In office 21 December 2011 – 13 February 2020

Member of the State Duma for Smolensk Oblast
- Incumbent
- Assumed office 5 October 2016
- Preceded by: constituency re-established
- Constituency: Smolensk (No. 175)

Member of the State Duma (Party List Seat)
- In office 24 December 2007 – 5 October 2016

Member of the State Duma for Kemerovo Oblast
- In office 18 January 2000 – 24 December 2007
- Preceded by: Viktor Medikov
- Succeeded by: constituencies abolished
- Constituency: Novokuznetsk (No. 90) (Note: Renumbered as 91 in 2003.)

Personal details
- Born: 21 December 1961 (age 64) Tashtagol, Kemerovo Oblast, Russian SFSR, USSR
- Party: United Russia
- Spouse: Olga Neverova
- Children: 3
- Education: Siberian State Industrial University
- Sergey Neverov's voice Neverov on the Echo of Moscow program, 21 January 2013

Sergey Ivanoviсh Neverov (Russian: Сергей Иванович Неве́ров; born 21 December 1961) is a Russian political figure and deputy chairman of the State Duma of the Federal Assembly of the VI, VII and VIII convocations. He was the parliamentary leader of United Russia since 9 October 2017 to 19 September 2021. He was the Secretary of the General Council of the party United Russia from 2011 to 2017.

He was formerly a member of the State Duma of the Russian Federation of the third (1999), fourth (2003) and the fifth (2007) convocations. Prior to 1991, he was a member of the Communist Party of the Soviet Union.

== Sanctions ==
In July 2014, he was included in the sanctions list of the United States.

Neverov was sanctioned by the government of the United Kingdom in 2014 in relation to the Russo-Ukrainian War.

== Family ==
He is married to Olga Viktorovna Neverova (born 1962), and they have two children.

== Awards ==
- Distinguished Miner of Kuzbass
- Order of Honour (2010)
- Order of Friendship (2014)
- Medal of the Order For Merit to the Fatherland
- Certificate of Merit of the President of the Russian Federation

== Notes ==
Preceded by Vladimir Vasilyev	Parliamentary leader of United Russia in the State Duma; 2017–2021	Succeeded by Vladimir Vasilyev
