= Tyomkino, Tyomkinskoye Rural Settlement, Tyomkinsky District, Smolensk Oblast =

Tyomkino Тёмкино
- Settlement
- Interactive map of Tyomkino
- Location of Tyomkino Tyomkino (Smolensk Oblast)
- Country: Russia
- Federal subject: Smolensk Oblast
- Administrative district: Tyomkinsky District
- Selsoviet: Tyomkinsky Selsoviet
- Founded: 1874

Area
  - Total: 5.73 km^{2} (2.21 sq mi)
- Elevation: 197 m (646 ft)

Population (2010 Census)
  - Total: 1,942
  - Estimate (2018): 2,346 (+20.8%)
  - Density: 339/km^{2} (878/sq mi)

Administrative status
  - Capital of: Tyomkinsky District, Tyomkinsky Selsoviet

Municipal status
  - Municipal district: Tyomkinsky Municipal District
  - Rural settlement: Tyomkinskoye Rural Settlement
  - Capital of: Tyomkinsky Municipal District
- Time zone: UTC+3 (MSK)
- Postal code: 215350
- Dialing code: +7 48136
- OKTMO ID: 66648450101

Tyomkino (Russian: Тёмкино) is a rural locality (a selo) and the administrative center of Tyomkinsky District in Smolensk Oblast of Russia. Population: 2,414 (2010 census); 2,452 (2002 census); 2,764 (1989 Soviet census).

== History ==
Tyomkino was occupied by German forces during World War II and is still surrounded by a series of trenches and fortifications. The site of fierce fighting, munitions are still regularly unearthed in its fields.

== Tourism and recreation ==
Tyomkino is a popular holiday destination, with its pure underground springs believed to have healing and recuperative powers.

== Religion ==
Believed to be the final resting place of Saint Makaria, it has become a place of pilgrimage for followers of the Russian Orthodox faith. She was canonized for her powers of healing.

A new Russian Orthodox Church, constructed entirely of wood, has recently been built in Tyomkino.
