= Dmitry Abramenkov =

Russian politician

Dmitriy Nikolayevich Abramenkov (born April 24, 1947) is a Russian government official and political figure.

Abramenkov was the vice-governor of the Smolensk Oblast and was a deputy in the State Duma during the second (1995–1999) and third (1999–2003) sessions.

Abramenkov graduated from the Roslavl Technical School for Rail Transport, and later attended the higher party school in Leningrad. He began his career as a crane operator and locomotive technician, before advancing to roles such as staff leader of the All-Union Komsomol of the Smolensk AES, chairman of the District Committee of People's Control, and instructor of the City Committee of the Communist Party of the Soviet Union. After being elected to the State Duma, he was Master of Production Training at the Roslavl Technical School for Rail Transport.

In the State Duma, Abramenkov was associated with the Communist Party of the Russian Federation. He served on the committee for science and was selected as a candidate for membership in the Central Committee of the Russian Communist Party.
