= Seltso, Sokolsky District, Vologda Oblast =

Seltso Сельцо
- Village
- Location within Vologda Oblast Location within Russia
- Coordinates: 59°26′N 40°12′E
- Country: Russia
- Region: Vologda Oblast
- District: Sokolsky District
- Time zone: UTC+3:00

Seltso (Russian: Сельцо) is a rural locality (a village) in Prigorodnoye Rural Settlement, Sokolsky District, Vologda Oblast, Russia. The population was 19 as of 2002.

== Geography ==
Seltso is located 10 km southeast of Sokol (the district's administrative centre) by road. Sloboda is the nearest rural locality.
