= Seltso, Ustyuzhensky District, Vologda Oblast =

Seltso Сельцо
- Village
- Location within Vologda Oblast Location within Russia
- Coordinates: 58°42′N 36°21′E
- Country: Russia
- Region: Vologda Oblast
- District: Ustyuzhensky District
- Time zone: UTC+3:00

Seltso (Russian: Сельцо) is a rural locality (a village) in Nikiforovskoye Rural Settlement, Ustyuzhensky District, Vologda Oblast, Russia. The population was 11 as of 2002.

== Geography ==
Seltso is located 22 km (14 mi) southwest of Ustyuzhna (the district's administrative centre) by road. Spasskoye is the nearest rural locality.
