= Gusino (village), Krasninsky District, Smolensk Oblast =

Village in Smolensk Oblast, Russia

Coordinates: 54°43′41″N 31°22′12″E

Gusino (Russian: Гусино) is a village in Krasninsky District of Smolensk Oblast, Russia, located in the west of Krasninsky District, 20 kilometers north of the district administrative center of Krasny and near the M1 ("Belarus") and P135 highways.

The population as of 2007 is 3,252 persons in an area of 5.55 km^{2}.

== Geography ==
There is a train station on the Moscow - Minsk line. The village is the administrative center of the Gusinsky rural settlement.

The local economy is centered on forestry and the production of peat, lumber, and drainage pipes.

The telephone dialing code is +7 48145, the postal code is 216117.

== History ==
In the 1930s, a Jewish kolkhoz (collective farm) was established at Gusoni. On the eve of World War II, the important local Jewish community counted around 600 members, more than half of the total population of Gusino.

The Germans occupied the village in July 1941; some Jews apparently managed to escape to the east before that. The Jews who remained in the city, 200 to 270 people, were concentrated in a ghetto on July 28, 1941 and were employed in various forced labor activities. In September and October 1941, a number of Jews were murdered in the village. On February 6, 1942, the remaining 280 Jews of the ghetto were murdered in a mass execution.
