= Seltso, Gorokhovetsky District, Vladimir Oblast =

Seltso Сельцо
- Village
- Location within Vladimir Oblast Location within Russia
- Coordinates: 55°59′N 42°24′E
- Country: Russia
- Region: Vladimir Oblast
- District: Gorokhovetsky District
- Time zone: UTC+3:00

Seltso (Russian: Сельцо) is a rural locality (a village) in Fominskoye Rural Settlement, Gorokhovetsky District, Vladimir Oblast, Russia. The population was 2 as of 2010.

== Geography ==
Seltso is located 37 km southwest of Gorokhovets (the district's administrative centre) by road. Pochinki is the nearest rural locality.

== History ==
In the salary books of the Ryazan diocese of 1678, the village was part of the Rostriginsky parish and was home to 11 peasant yards and 2 landlord yards.

In the 19th century to the first quarter of the 20th century, the village was part of the Fominsky volost division of the Gorokhovetsky district and since 1926 Seltso has been part of the Murom district. In 1859 there were 22 households in the village, in 1905 there were 40 households, and in 1926 there were 41 households.

Since 1929, the village has been part of the Pochinksky Village Council of the Fominsky District of the Gorky Territory. In 1940 Seltso joined the Fominsky Village Council and in 2005 Seltso joined the Fominsky Rural Settlement.
