= Kholmogory, Republic of Bashkortostan =

Kholmogory Холмогоры
- Village
- Location within Bashkortostan Location within Russia
- Coordinates: 52°42′N 55°45′E
- Country: Russia
- Region: Bashkortostan
- District: Kuyurgazinsky District
- Time zone: UTC+5:00

Kholmogory (Russian: Холмогоры) is a rural locality (a village) in Shabagishsky Selsoviet, Kuyurgazinsky District, Bashkortostan, Russia. The population was 121 as of 2010. There are 2 streets.

== Geography ==
Kholmogory is located 4 km west of Yermolayevo (the district's administrative centre) by road. Yermolayevo is the nearest rural locality.
