= Sergey Leonov =

Russian politician

- Сергей Леонов
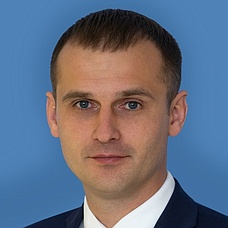
- Leonov in 2018

Member of the State Duma for Smolensk Oblast
- In office 12 October 2021 – 30 September 2026
- Preceded by: Olga Okuneva
- Succeeded by: constituency dissolved
- Constituency: Roslavl (No. 176)

Russian Federation Senator from Smolensk Oblast
- In office 27 September 2018 – 6 October 2021
- Preceded by: Lyudmila Kozlova
- Succeeded by: Irina Kozhanova

Personal details
- Born: Sergey Leonov; 9 May 1983 (age 43) Suvorov, Tula Oblast, Russian SFSR, Soviet Union
- Party: Liberal Democratic Party of Russia
- Education: Smolensk State Medical Academy; Smolensk Institute of Business and Entrepreneurship

Sergey Dmitriyevich Leonov (Russian: Сергей Дмитриевич Леонов; born 9 May 1983) is a Russian politician from the ultranationalist Liberal Democratic Party. He has represented Roslavl constituency in the State Duma since the 2021 election.

He was sanctioned by the United Kingdom in March 2022 for actions by Russia in Ukraine.

On 20 April 2022, during the Russian invasion of Ukraine, he proposed to forcibly take blood from Ukrainian war prisoners.

== Biography ==
Sergey Dmitriyevich Leonov was born on 9 May 1983, in the town of Suvorov, Tula Oblast. Since 1990, his family has been residing in the city of Smolensk.

In 2000, he graduated from the N. M. Przhevalsky Gymnasium in Smolensk, and in 2006 — from the Faculty of Medicine of the Smolensk State Medical Academy. In 2009, he graduated with honors from the Non-State Higher Professional Education Institution "Institute of Business and Entrepreneurship", majoring in Organization Management.

== Political career ==
From 2008 to 2011, he served as Deputy Coordinator of the LDPR's Smolensk Regional Branch, while also working as a public assistant to State Duma Deputy A. V. Ostrovsky in the Smolensk region (2009–2012).

In 2010, Sergey Leonov was elected deputy of the Smolensk District Duma of the Municipal District “Smolensky District” in Smolensk Oblast representing LDPR. In 2013, he was elected deputy of the Smolensk Regional Duma of the 5th convocation on the LDPR list and became Chairman of the Regional Duma Committee on Local Self-Government, Civil Service, and Relations with Public Organizations. At the time of his election, he was Director of the "Scientific Research Center for Biotechnology" LLC.

Since 2013, he has held the position of Coordinator of the LDPR's Smolensk Regional Branch.

Member of the Federation Council from the legislative authority of Smolensk Oblast from 27 September 2018, to 6 October 2021. Coordinator of the LDPR Smolensk Regional Branch from 2013 to 2021.

Deputy Chairman of the All-Russian Public Organization "Russian Union of Young Scientists".

Deputy of the Smolensk Regional Duma of the 5th convocation, elected on the LDPR party list, from 2013 to 2018.

Member of the State Duma of the Russian Federation (2021-2026).

On 6 October 2021, the Federation Council terminated Leonov's senatorial powers in connection with his election to the State Duma.
