= Safonovskaya =

Safonovskaya Сафоновская
- Village
- Location within Vologda Oblast Location within Russia
- Coordinates: 60°26′N 41°02′E
- Country: Russia
- Region: Vologda Oblast
- District: Vozhegodsky District
- Time zone: UTC+3:00

Safonovskaya (Russian: Сафоновская) is a rural locality (a village) in Nizhneslobodskoye Rural Settlement, Vozhegodsky District, Vologda Oblast, Russia. The population was 17 as of 2002.

== Geography ==
Safonovskaya is located 56 km east of Vozhega (the district's administrative centre) by road. Timoshinskaya is the nearest rural locality.
