= Vladimir Beryozov =

Russian military officer and politician (1940–2024)

Member of the Federation Council of Russia for Smolensk Oblast
- In office 18 January 2002 – 18 June 2002
- Succeeded by: Sergey Antufyev

Personal details
- Born: Vladimir Prokofievich Beryozov; 12 December 1940 Makhachkala, Dagestan ASSR, Russian SFSR, USSR
- Died: 5 March 2024 (aged 83) Smolensk, Russia
- Party: CPRF
- Education: Lenin Military-Political Academy
- Occupation: Military officer

Vladimir Prokofievich Beryozov (Russian: Владимир Прокофьевич Берёзов; 12 December 1940 – 5 March 2024) was a Russian military officer and politician. A member of the Communist Party of the Russian Federation, he served in the Federation Council from January to June 2002.

Beryozov died in Smolensk on 5 March 2024 at the age of 83.
