= Temkino, Vladimir Oblast =

Temkino Темкино
- Village
- Location within Vladimir Oblast Location within Russia
- Coordinates: 56°28′N 38°49′E
- Country: Russia
- Region: Vladimir Oblast
- District: Alexandrovsky District
- Time zone: UTC+3:00

Temkino (Russian: Темкино) is a rural locality (a village) in Slednevskoye Rural Settlement, Alexandrovsky District, Vladimir Oblast, Russia. The population was 20 as of 2010. There are 4 streets.

== Geography ==
Temkino is located on the Seraya River, 12 km northeast of Alexandrov (the district's administrative centre) by road. Svinkino is the nearest rural locality.
