= Safonovsky, Volgograd Oblast =

Safonovsky Сафоновский
- Khutor
- Location within Volgograd Oblast Location within Russia
- Coordinates: 50°40′N 41°48′E
- Country: Russia
- Region: Volgograd Oblast
- District: Uryupinsky District
- Time zone: UTC+4:00

Safonovsky (Russian: Сафоновский) is a rural locality (a khutor) in Rossoshinskoye Rural Settlement, Uryupinsky District, Volgograd Oblast, Russia. The population was 137 as of 2010. There is 1 street.

== Geography ==
Safonovsky is located 31 km southwest of Uryupinsk (the district's administrative centre) by road. Rossoshinsky is the nearest rural locality.
