= Seltso, Kovrovsky District, Vladimir Oblast =

Seltso Сельцо
- Village
- Location within Vladimir Oblast Location within Russia
- Coordinates: 56°26′N 41°50′E
- Country: Russia
- Region: Vladimir Oblast
- District: Kovrovsky District
- Time zone: UTC+3:00

Seltso (Russian: Сельцо) is a rural locality (a village) in Klyazminskoye Rural Settlement, Kovrovsky District, Vladimir Oblast, Russia. The population was 21 as of 2010.

== Geography ==
Seltso is located 43 km east of Kovrov (the district's administrative centre) by road. Panteleyevo is the nearest rural locality.
