= Union of Communists =

All-Union Party «Union of Communists» Всесоюзная партия «Союз коммунистов»
- Abbreviation: SK (English); СК (Russian)
- General Secretary: Sergei Stepanov
- Founded: November 17, 1991; 33 years ago
- Registered: September 29, 1992; 32 years ago
- Preceded by: Marxist platform of the CPSU
- Headquarters: Moscow, Russia
- Newspaper: Iskra (Spark); Golos Kommunista (Voice of communist); Glasnost
- Membership: 2,000
- Ideology: Communism; Marxism-Leninism; Stalinism; Anti-revisionism; Soviet patriotism Scientific communism
- Political position: Far-left
- National affiliation: RCWP-CPSU
- Continental affiliation: UCP-CPSU (before 2001); CPSU
- Colours: Red
- Slogan: "Workers of the world, unite!" (Russian: "Пролетарии всех стран, соединяйтесь!")
- Anthem: The Internationale
- Seats in the State Duma: 0 / 450
- Seats in the Regional Parliaments: 0 / 3,994

Website
- soyuz-kommunistov.ru

The All-Union Party «Union of Communists» (SK; Russian: Всесоюзная партия «Союз коммунистов»; СК; Vsesoyuznaya partiya «Soyuz kommunistov», SK) is a communist party created in 1991 in the USSR, operating in the territory of the countries of the former Soviet Union, the second communist party created after the dissolution of the Communist Party of the Soviet Union (CPSU).

A distinctive feature of the SK was that its organizational work from the very beginning was focused not on the formation of its own structures, but on establishing contacts with supporters of the revival of the CPSU.

As an all-Russian organization, the party was registered by the Ministry of Justice of the Russian Federation on September 29, 1992.

== Party structure ==
The party declares the principle of democratic centralism, which provides for the mutual accountability of higher and lower levels, the subordination of the minority to the majority, while maintaining the minority's rights to defend their views and representation in elected bodies.

Primary organizations, created on the basis of territorial, functional, professional and other characteristics, are the main link of the SK party. Primary organizations are united in regional (district, city, regional, territorial, republican) party organizations in accordance with the administrative-territorial division.

The supreme body of the All-Union Party Union of Communists is the Congress, which is held at least once every 5 years. The congress is in charge of program and statutory issues, determines the strategy of the party, elects its governing bodies - the Central Committee (CC) and the Central Control Commission (CCC), responsible for carrying out the outlined course and ensuring the unity of the party ranks.

Since 1994, the main press organ of the UK has been the Iskra newspaper. Earlier, the main press organ of the Investigative Committee was the independent communist newspaper Golos Kommunista (Voice of Communist), which was restored in January 1993. While the party was a member of the UCP-CPSU, materials on the activities of the Investigative Committee were periodically printed in the social and political weekly Glasnost.

== History ==
On September 7–8, 1991, at a meeting of the Coordinating Council of the Marxist Platform (MP) in the CPSU, by a majority vote, it was decided to create a "new communist party" Union of Communists "(working title)", the successor to the CPSU, which "will unite like-minded people on the ideological basis of the Marxist platform". The Organizing Committee of the "Union of Communists" was formed, which included A. Prigarin, V. Isaichikov, O. Melnikov, S. Terekhov, O. Khlobustov.

=== Congresses and Conferences ===
- The founding conference of the Union of Communists of the RSFSR - took place on November 16–17, 1991 in the city of Zheleznodorozhny, Moscow Oblast and in Moscow, 210 people took part in it, who represented 7 regions and 2 autonomous republics of the then RSFSR, as well as 6 republics of the USSR. 15 journalists were accredited for the conference. The conference participants elected the composition of the organizing committee of the Union of Communists party, the program and statutory commissions.
- The 1st Congress of the Union of Communists was held on April 25–26, 1992 in Moscow. 82 delegates, participants of the InterSK Congress and 162 guests took part in the work of the 1st Congress of the Union of Communists. The Congress adopted the Political Resolution, the Anti-Crisis Economic Program (mainly), the resolution "On the organizational development of the Union of Communists", as well as amendments to the SK Charter. The congress elected a Central Committee and a Central Control and Revision Commission of the Union of Communists. At the joint Plenum held after the end of the congress, the Central Committee Secretariat and the Central Committee Bureau were elected.
- II Congress of the Union of Communists - held on October 23, 1993 in Moscow, at which the post of the first secretary of the Central Committee was established. S. N. Stepanov was elected first secretary of the Central Committee of the Investigative Committee. A. A. Prigarin with a group of his supporters in December 1993. were expelled from the party "Union of Communists" for anti-party activities.
- III Congress of the Party "Union of Communists" - held on December 10, 1994 in Moscow.
- IV (extraordinary) congress of the "Union of Communists" party - held on August 12, 1995, which made a decision on the party's participation in the elections to the State Duma under the auspices of the "Union of Communists" electoral association and approved the lists of candidates from the "Union of Communists" party for deputies
- The 6th Congress of the Union of Communists Party took place in Moscow at the end of January 2000. At the congress, it was decided to support Gennady Zyuganov in the presidential elections - as a single candidate from the communists. Resolutions were also adopted on measures to achieve the unity of the communists and the entire patriotic opposition, and on the party-political rehabilitation of Joseph Stalin. Changes were made to the charter, governing bodies were elected, S. Stepanov became the first secretary of the Central Committee of the SK.
- The 7th Congress of the Union of Communists Party took place in Moscow at the end of March 2004. By the decision of the congress, the amended and amended texts of the Charter and Program of the Party were proposed for discussion by the Communists of all currents - as the basis for the Charter and Program of the United Communist Party, which is to be built immediately.
- The 8th Congress of the Union of Communists Party was held on January 31, 2015 in Moscow, attended by 57 delegates from seven republics of the USSR. The Congress introduced a number of changes to the Charter and Program of the All-Union Party "Union of Communists" and adopted a number of statements, appeals and resolutions. In the documents adopted by the congress, two main ideas are the unification of the communists and the creation of an all-union patriotic front, where all progressive patriotic forces would interact. At the congress, new members of the Central Committee and Central Control Commission of the party were elected. S. N. Stepanov was elected General Secretary of the Central Committee of the All-Union Party "Union of Communists".
- IX Congress of the All-Union Party "Union of Communists" - took place on February 16, 2020 in Moscow, which was attended by delegates from nine republics of the USSR. 27 delegates took the floor in the debate. In the reports and speeches of the delegates, an analysis of the current situation was given, information was announced on preparations for the celebration of the 150th anniversary of the birth of Vladimir Ilyich Lenin and the 75th anniversary of Victory in the Great Patriotic War, achievements and shortcomings in the work of the Central Committee, its departments, republican and regional committees. The congress adopted a number of statements, appeals and resolutions, which were published in the Iskra newspaper. At the congress, new members of the Central Committee and Central Control Commission of the party were elected. S. N. Stepanov was elected General Secretary of the Central Committee of the All-Union Party "Union of Communists".

=== Struggle to restore the CPSU ===
The party "Union of Communists" announced the need to recreate the CPSU at the founding conference (November 16–17, 1991). At the Plenum of the Central Committee of the CPSU on June 13, 1992, the organizing committee was elected to hold the XX Party Conference of the CPSU and the XXIX Congress of the CPSU It also included two representatives of the party, A. A. Prigarin and S. N. Stepanov.

Since the fall of 1992, work on the reconstruction of the Communist Party of the RSFSR and its organizational structures has been widely deployed both in the center and in the localities. By this time, there were several approaches to the restoration and further development of the Russian Communist Party, one of them in the form of the restoration of the Communist Party of the RSFSR as an integral (regional) part of the CPSU, regardless of the court decision, even if it is not registered, supported by the Bolshevik Platform, the Union of Communists, the recreated Central Committee Komsomol, Informburo MGK KPSU .

In October 1992, the XX Party Conference of the CPSU took place. It made a decision to prepare the XXIX Congress of the CPSU and re-register the Communists and was held as an event of the "Union of Communists".

On December 12, 1992, a joint plenum of the Central Committee and the Central Control Commission of the "Union of Communists" party was held, at which the issues of the current situation in the communist movement of the country, the organizational tasks of the Union of Communists, which considers the task of the Communists - members of the Union of Communists - to actively participate in the work to restore the CP RSFSR and the CPSU, including active work in Moscow in the organizing committees of the XXIX Congress of the CPSU and the II Congress of the Communist Party of the RSFSR.

The result of the work of the Union of Communists party to rally the communist forces during that period was the holding of the XXIX Congress of the CPSU, which took place in March 1993. And the very first members of the UCP-CPSU were the Union of Communists party, the Union of Communists of Latvia and the Communist Party of South Ossetia. They, according to the Charter of the UCP-CPSU, signed a protocol on joining the UCP-CPSU in April 1993.

=== Union of Communists and Black October 1993 ===
The Union of Communists Party took an active part in defending the Constitutional system of the RSFSR and opposed the coup d'etat. In the events of September–October 1993, hundreds of members of the Union of Communists Party were received, dozens of members of the Union of Communists Party were awarded the Order of the Defender of the Soviets. Courage during these events was shown by the secretaries of the Central Committee of the Union of Communists party V. A. Ershov, V. S. Markov, E. A. Kafyrin, O. Menshikova, S. N. Stepanov, members of the Central Committee V. Bondarenko, M. Kukel, V. A. Shilkin and many other party members.

Sergei Stepanov together with Sergei Chernyakhovsky wrote at nine o'clock in the evening on September 21, 1993 at the House of Soviets, a statement on behalf of the Political Executive Committee of the SPK-CPSU regarding the coup d'état committed by Yeltsin. This statement was transmitted to Novaya Square, where the editorial office of the Glasnost newspaper was located.

The party Union of Communists organized the information center "Ring of the Federation", which provided truthful information about the events near the House of the Council in all subjects of the RSFSR. Much credit for this belongs to Elena and Georgy Afanasyev. The Union of Communists Party organized the delivery in September 1993 of food and medicine for the defenders of the House of Soviets. The party has issued and distributed tens of thousands of leaflets.

=== The Union of Communists is a participant in the creation of the People's Patriotic Union of Russia ===
In 1996, the People's Patriotic Union of Russia (NPSR) appeared, it was established by the Agrarian Party of Russia, the Communist Party of the Russian Federation, and a number of other communist parties, and among them was the Union of Communists party, as well as a number of other organizations of various kinds, from the party they were members of the Coordination Council of the People's Patriotic Union of Russia Sergey Stepanov and Vladimir Markov.

=== In the 21st century ===
In recent years, the party has focused on creating party organizations throughout the entire Soviet Union and providing practical assistance to ordinary citizens (for example, the case of V.D. Zazykina won in 2014). The Union of Communists party also considers the creation and registration in 2011 of the International the public association Union of Communists, which currently exists in Russia, Belarus, Ukraine and a number of CIS republics. There is also an agreement to establish a branch of the International Public Association "Union of Communists" in Bulgaria and a number of other countries of Eastern Europe.

== Prominent members ==
- Sergei Nikolaevich Stepanov (Born 1957) - General (formerly First) Secretary of the Central Committee of the All-Union Party "Union of Communists"
- Vladimir Semenovich Markov (1934-2013) - Second Secretary of the Central Committee of the All-Union Party "Union of Communists", editor-in-chief of the newspapers "Iskra" and "For the Motherland, for Stalin - Today and Always."
- Natalia Pavlovna Balatskaya (Born 1950) - Secretary of the Central Committee of the All-Union Party "Union of Communists", Chairman of the Russian branch of the International Public Organization "Union of Communists".
- Alexey Alekseevich Prigarin (1930—2016) - member of the Central Committee of the CPSU (until 1993), one of the secretaries of the Central Committee of the Union of Communists until 1993. Expelled from the Union of Communists party with a group of his supporters after the II Congress of the Union communists ", later headed the UCP-CPSU
- A. P. Beresneva (1940-2007) - head. kindergarten, the first secretary of the Yartsevo city committee of the "Union of Communists" party, one of the organizers of the presentation of the Order of the Patriotic War to Yartsevo in 2001 for his significant contribution to the Victory over fascism.
- Grigory Vasilievich Stakheev (1924-2004) - Honorary Citizen of the city of Nizhnyaya Salda, representative of the Central Committee of the Union of Communists Party in the Sverdlovsk Region and the city (city of Nizhnyaya Salda) Council of War and Home Front Veterans.
- Ivan Fotievich Stadnyuk (1920-1994) - Soviet writer and military journalist, in the Union of Communists since 1991.
- Vasiliy Vasilievich Shcherbakov (1951-2010) - Hero of the Soviet Union, colonel of the Soviet army, member of the Central Committee of the All-Union Party "Union of Communists", oversaw work with young people there.

== See also ==
- List of anti-revisionist groups

== Books ==
- Yuri Korgunyuk, Sergei Zaslavsky Russian multi-party system: formation, functioning, development — М.: INDEM Foundation, 1996. — Chapter 5. The communist movement.
