= Kholm-Zhirkovsky (urban locality) =

Kholm-Zhirkovsky Холм-Жирковский
- Urban-type settlement
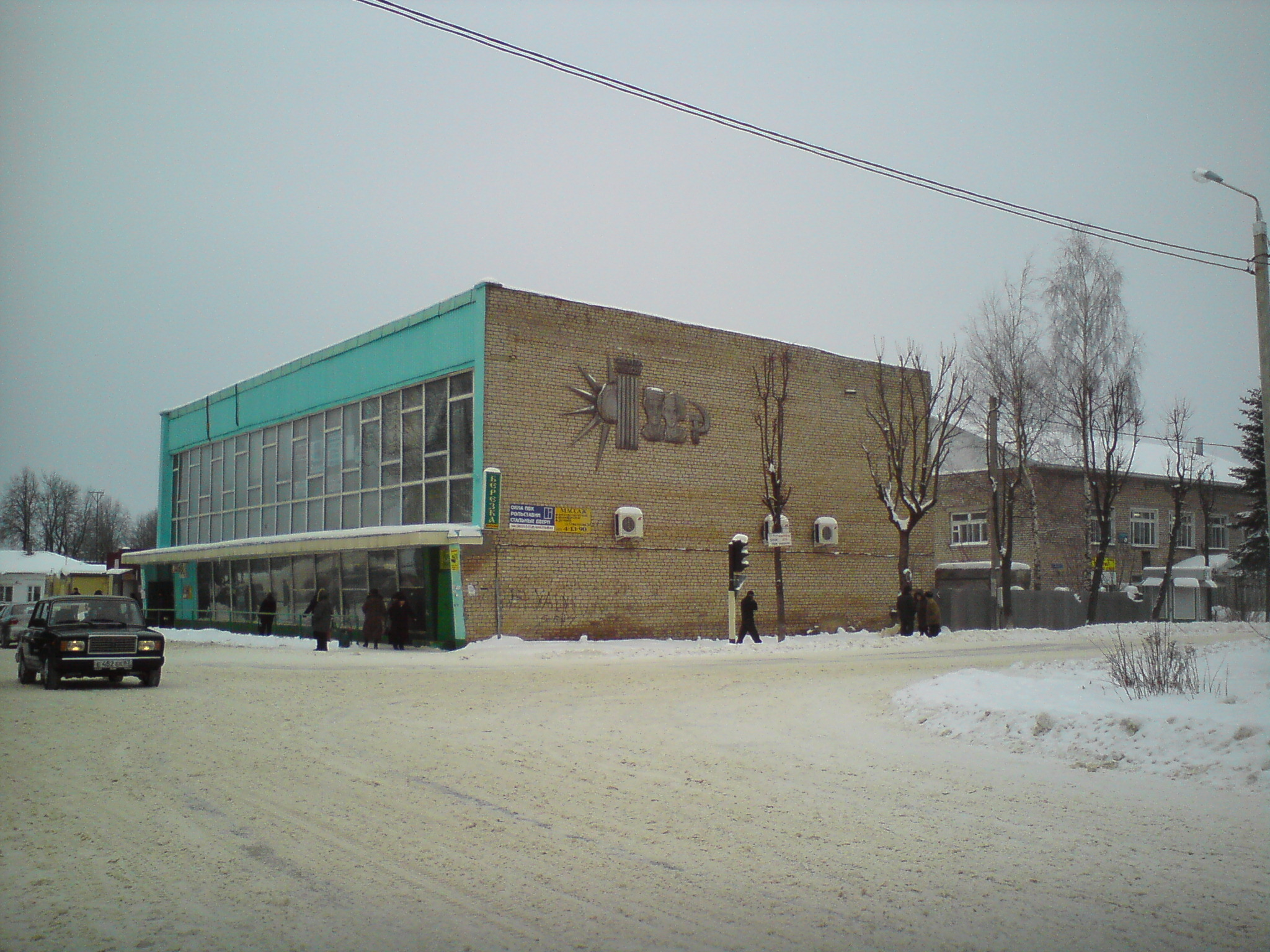

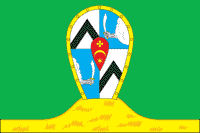
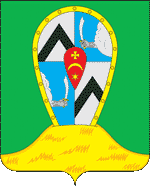
- Flag Coat of arms
- Interactive map of Kholm-Zhirkovsky
- Location of Kholm-Zhirkovsky Kholm-Zhirkovsky (Smolensk Oblast)
- Coordinates: 55°31′N 33°28′E
- Country: Russia
- Federal subject: Smolensk Oblast
- Administrative district: Kholm-Zhirkovsky District
- Founded: 1708

Population (2010 Census)
  - Total: 3,491
  - Estimate (2024): 3,006 (−13.9%)
- Time zone: UTC+3 (MSK)
- Postal code: 215650
- OKTMO ID: 66654151051

Kholm-Zhirkovsky (Russian: Холм-Жирковский) is an urban locality (an urban-type settlement) in Kholm-Zhirkovsky District of Smolensk Oblast, Russia, located 130 kilometers (81 mi) northeast of Smolensk, about 300 kilometers (190 mi) west of Moscow, and 38 kilometers (24 mi) from the Moscow-Minsk highway. Population: 3,491 (2010 census); 3,826 (2002 census); 3,666 (1989 Soviet census).

Kholm-Zhirkovsky was first mentioned in 1708. Urban-type settlement status was granted to it in 1971.
