= Glinkovsky District =

Glinkovsky District Глинковский район (Russian)
- District
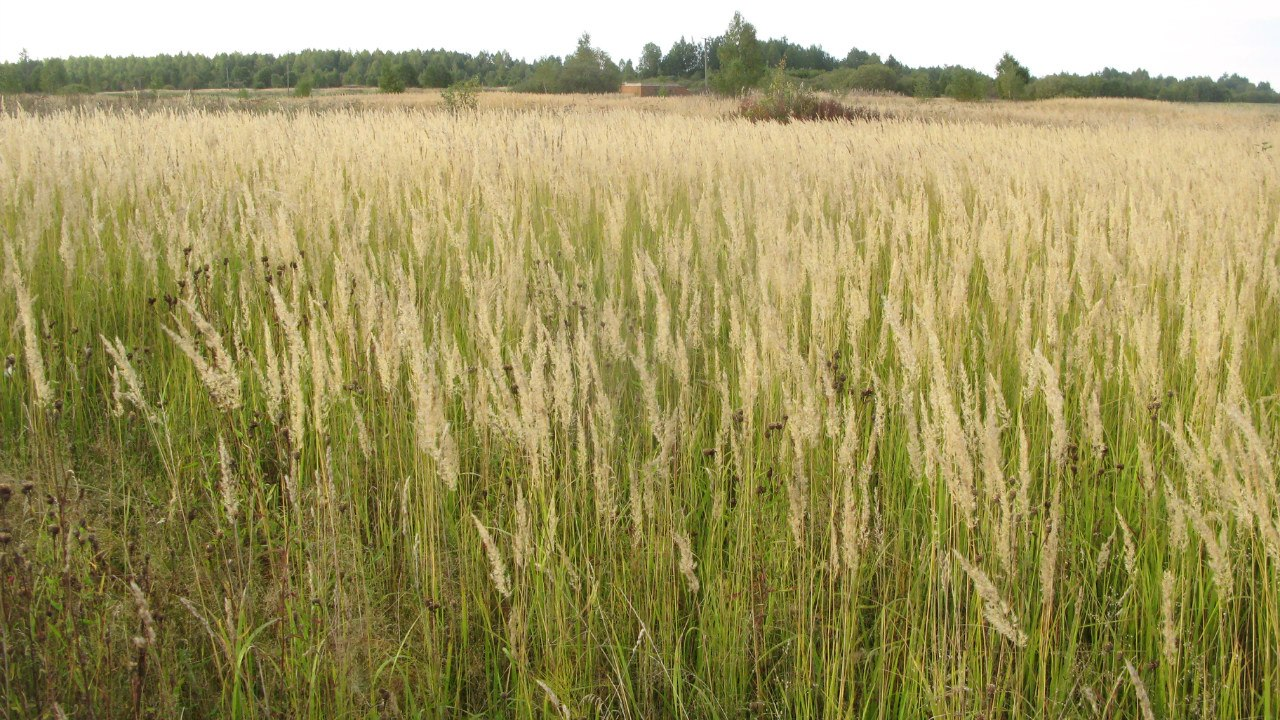
- Village Monino (deserted), Glinkovsky District

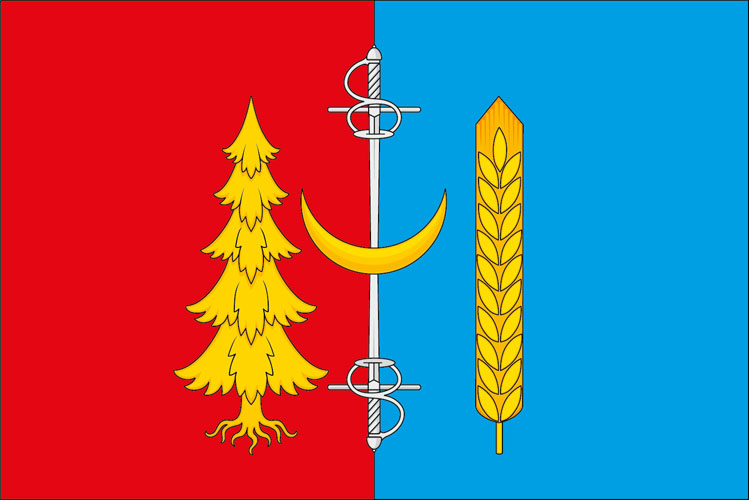
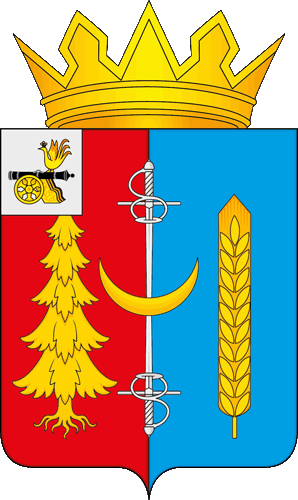
- Flag Coat of arms
- Location of Glinkovsky District in Smolensk Oblast
- Coordinates: 54°39′06″N 32°52′26″E
- Country: Russia
- Federal subject: Smolensk Oblast
- Established: 1929
- Administrative center: Glinka

Area
  - Total: 1,225.74 km^{2} (473.26 sq mi)

Population (2010 Census)
  - Total: 4,948
  - Density: 4.037/km^{2} (10.46/sq mi)
  - Urban: 0%
  - Rural: 100%

Administrative structure
  - Administrative divisions: 6 rural settlement
  - Inhabited localities: 90 rural localities

Municipal structure
  - Municipally incorporated as: Glinkovsky Municipal District
  - Municipal divisions: 0 urban settlements, 6 rural settlements
- Time zone: UTC+3 (MSK)
- OKTMO ID: 66609000
- Website: http://glinka.admin-smolensk.ru/

Glinkovsky District (Russian: Гли́нковский райо́н) is an administrative and municipal district (raion), one of the twenty-five in Smolensk Oblast, Russia. It lies in the center of the oblast and borders with Dorogobuzhsky District in the northeast, Yelninsky District in the southeast, Pochinkovsky District in the southwest, and with Kardymovsky District in the west. The area of the district is 1,225.74 square kilometers (473.26 sq mi). Its administrative center is the rural locality (a selo) of Glinka. Population: 4,948 (2010 Census); 6,149 (2002 census); 7,866 (1989 Soviet census).

The population of Glinka accounts for 39.3% of the district's total population. The settlement which became Glinka dates from 1898. On 1 June 1907 the railway station was renamed Glinka in honour of the composer Mikhail Glinka (died February 1857).

== Geography ==
Glinkovsky District is located on the Smolensk Upland. The whole area of the district belongs to the drainage basin of the Dnieper. Rivers in the north and in the center of the district drain to the Dnieper directly. The biggest of them are the Ustrom and the Volost. Minor areas in the south of the district belong to the drainage basins of the Desna and the Sozh, major left tributaries of the Dnieper. The Dnieper itself makes part of the border with Kardymovsky District.

== History ==
The area in the Middle Ages belonged intermittently to the Principality of Smolensk, the Grand Duchy of Lithuania, the Grand Duchy of Moscow, and Poland. In the course of the administrative reform carried out in 1708 by Peter the Great, the area was included into Smolensk Governorate and remained there until 1929, with the exception of the brief periods between 1713 and 1726, when it belonged to Riga Governorate, and between 1775 and 1796, when Smolensk Governorate was transformed into Smolensk Viceroyalty. It was split between Smolensky and Yelninsky Uyezd. Glinka was founded in 1898 as a settlement serving Sovkino railway station and was renamed in 1907 to commemorate the composer Mikhail Glinka who was born in the selo of Novospasskoye close by. In October 1928, Yelninsky Uyezd was abolished and split between Smolensky, Roslavlsky, and Vyazemsky Uyezds.

On 12 July 1929, governorates and uyezds were abolished, and Glinkovsky District with the administrative center in the selo of Glinka was established on the territories which previously belonged to Yelninsky and Smolensky Uyezds. The district belonged to Smolensk Okrug of Western Oblast. On August 1, 1930, the okrugs were abolished, and the districts were subordinated directly to the oblast. On 27 September 1937 Western Oblast was abolished and split between Oryol and Smolensk Oblasts. Glinkovsky District was transferred to Smolensk Oblast. Between 1941 and 1943, during WWII, the district was occupied by German troops. On 21 August 1961, Glinkovsky District was merged into Yelninsky District, but on 20 October 1980 it was re-established.

== Economy ==
=== Industry ===
There are no large-scale industrial enterprises in the district. There are plans to build a cement plant and to develop timber industry.

=== Agriculture ===
The main agricultural specialization of the district is cattle breeding with milk and meat production.

=== Transportation ===
The railway connecting Smolensk and Sukhinichi via Spas-Demensk crosses the district from northwest to southeast. Glinka is the largest railway station in the district. There is infrequent passenger navigation.

Glinka has connections to roads connecting Yelnya and Pochinok, as well as Yelnya and Safonovo (with further access to the M1 highway connecting Moscow and Smolensk).

The Dnieper is navigable within the district, however, there is no organized navigation.
