= Krasninsky District, Smolensk Oblast =

Krasninsky District Краснинский район (Russian)
- District
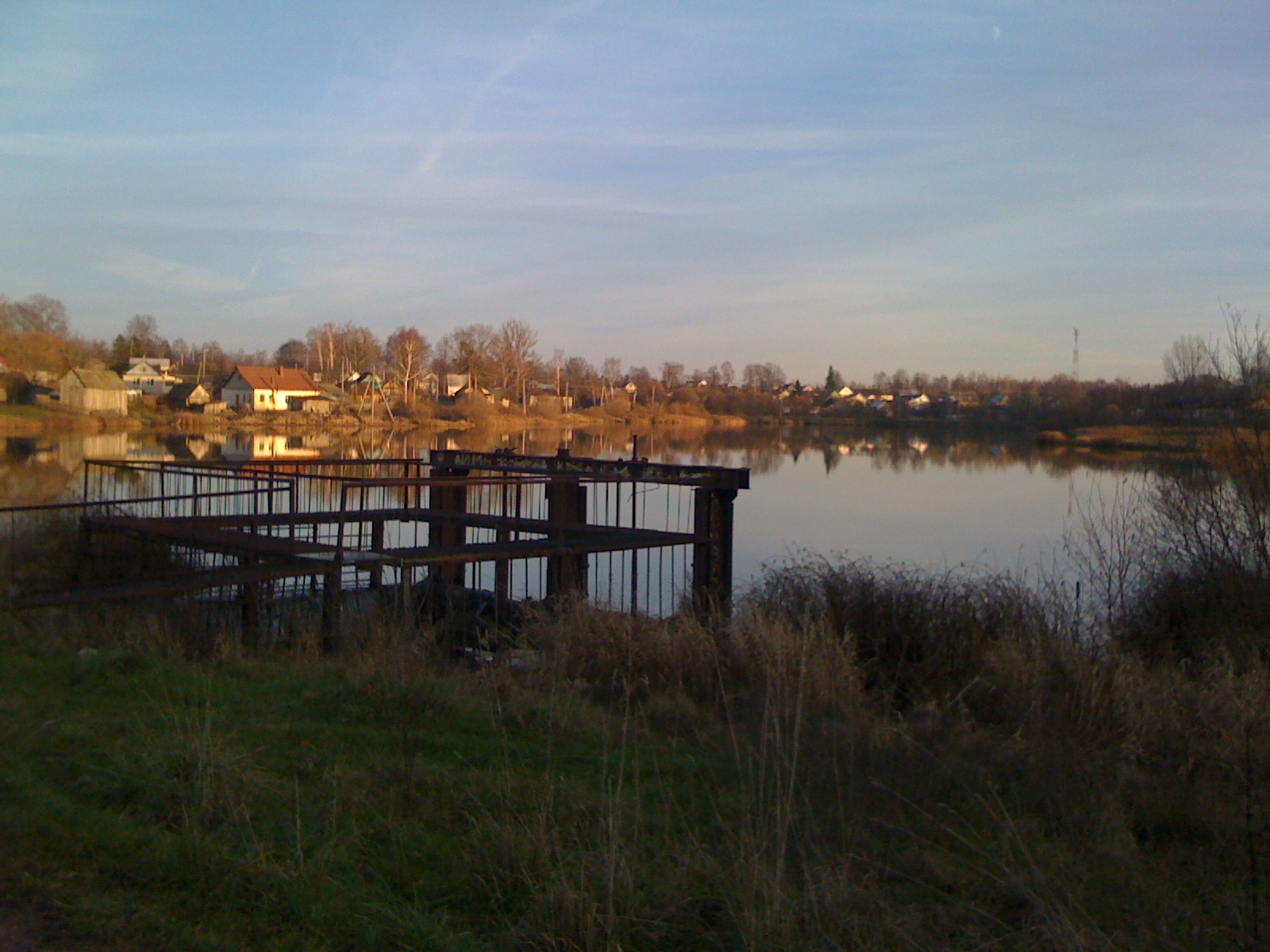
- Lake view, Krasninsky District

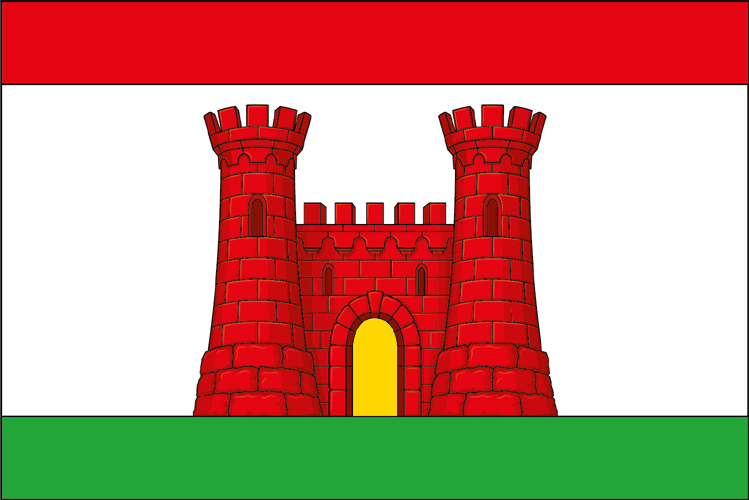
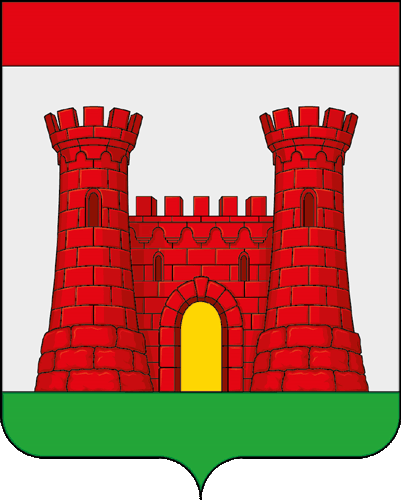
- Flag Coat of arms
- Location of Krasninsky District in Smolensk Oblast
- Coordinates: 54°33′36″N 31°26′06″E
- Country: Russia
- Federal subject: Smolensk Oblast
- Established: 1929 (first), 1965 (second)
- Administrative center: Krasny

Area
  - Total: 1,507.67 km^{2} (582.11 sq mi)

Population (2010 Census)
  - Total: 12,895
  - Density: 8.5529/km^{2} (22.152/sq mi)
  - Urban: 33.7%
  - Rural: 66.3%

Administrative structure
  - Administrative divisions: 1 Urban settlements, 12 Rural settlements
  - Inhabited localities: 1 urban-type settlements, 181 rural localities

Municipal structure
  - Municipally incorporated as: Krasninsky Municipal District
  - Municipal divisions: 1 urban settlements, 12 rural settlements
- Time zone: UTC+3 (MSK)
- OKTMO ID: 66624000
- Website: http://krasniy.admin-smolensk.ru/

Krasninsky District (Russian: Кра́снинский райо́н) is an administrative and municipal district (raion), one of the twenty-five in Smolensk Oblast, Russia. It is located in the west of the oblast and borders with Rudnyansky District in the north, Smolensky District in the east, Monastyrshchinsky District in the south, Horki District of Mogilev Region of Belarus in the southwest, and with Dubrowna District of Vitebsk Region, also of Belarus, in the west. The area of the district is 1,507.67 square kilometers (582.11 sq mi). Its administrative center is the urban locality (a settlement) of Krasny. Population: 12,895 (2010 Census); 15,537 (2002 census); 18,758 (1989 Soviet census). The population of Krasny accounts for 33.7% of the district's total population.

== Geography ==
Most of the district's territory is located on the Smolensk-Krasninsky Plateau. Soils of the area are formed mostly of loam, sand, and sandy loam. Forests cover 29.3% of the territory.

The whole area of the district belongs to the drainage basin of the Dnieper. The Dnieper crosses the northern part of the district. Its major (left) tributary within the district, the Mereya, flows in the north of the district and forms a natural border between Krasninsky District and Vitebsk Region of Belarus, itself part of the Belarus–Russia border. The rivers in the eastern part of the district drain into the Sozh, another major left tributary of the Dnieper; the biggest of them is the Vikhra River.

== History ==
The area was settled in the prehistory, and there are multiple archaeological sites in the district. Krasny (originally Krasn or Krasen) is first mentioned in 1165 by the Hypatian Codex, when Davyd Rostislavich, Prince of Smolensk, gave Krasen to his nephew, Roman of Vitebsk. Between the second half of the 14th century and the middle of the 17th century, the area belonged intermittently to the Grand Duchy of Lithuania, to Poland, and to the Grand Duchy of Moscow. Since 1654, it was finally transferred to the Tsardom of Russia.

In the course of the administrative reform carried out in 1708 by Peter the Great, the area was included into Smolensk Governorate and remained there until 1929, with the exception of the brief period between 1775 and 1796, when Smolensk Governorate was transformed into Smolensk Viceroyalty. The area belonged to Krasninsky Uyezd, which was established in 1775. In 1776, Krasny was granted town status. In 1796, the uyezd was abolished but it was re-established in 1802.

During the French invasion of Russia, Krasny played an important role, since the French army passed it twice en route to and from Russia. The Battle of Krasnoi was fought here in November 1812.

On 12 July 1929, governorates and uyezds were abolished, and Krasninsky District with the administrative center in Krasny was established. The district belonged to Smolensk Okrug of Western Oblast. On August 1, 1930 the okrugs were abolished, and the districts were subordinated directly to the oblast. On 27 September 1937 Western Oblast was abolished and split between Oryol and Smolensk Oblasts. Krasninsky District was transferred to Smolensk Oblast. Between 1941 and 1943, during WWII, the district was occupied by German troops. On 1 February 1963, during the abortive Khrushchyov administrative reform, Krasninsky District was merged into Smolensky District, but in 1965 it was re-established.

== Economy ==
The district's economy is mostly agricultural, specializing in beef and dairy cattle, potatoes, and flax. Industry includes flax and dairy processing, vegetable processing, and manufacture of drainage pipes (all in Krasny and Gusino).

=== Transportation ===
The Moscow–Brest railway line and the M1 "Belarus" Highway both run through the northern part of the district, connecting Smolensk and Orsha. Krasny has access to M1 and is additionally connected by paved roads with Smolensk and with Orsha (so called Old Smolensk Road).

== Culture and recreation ==
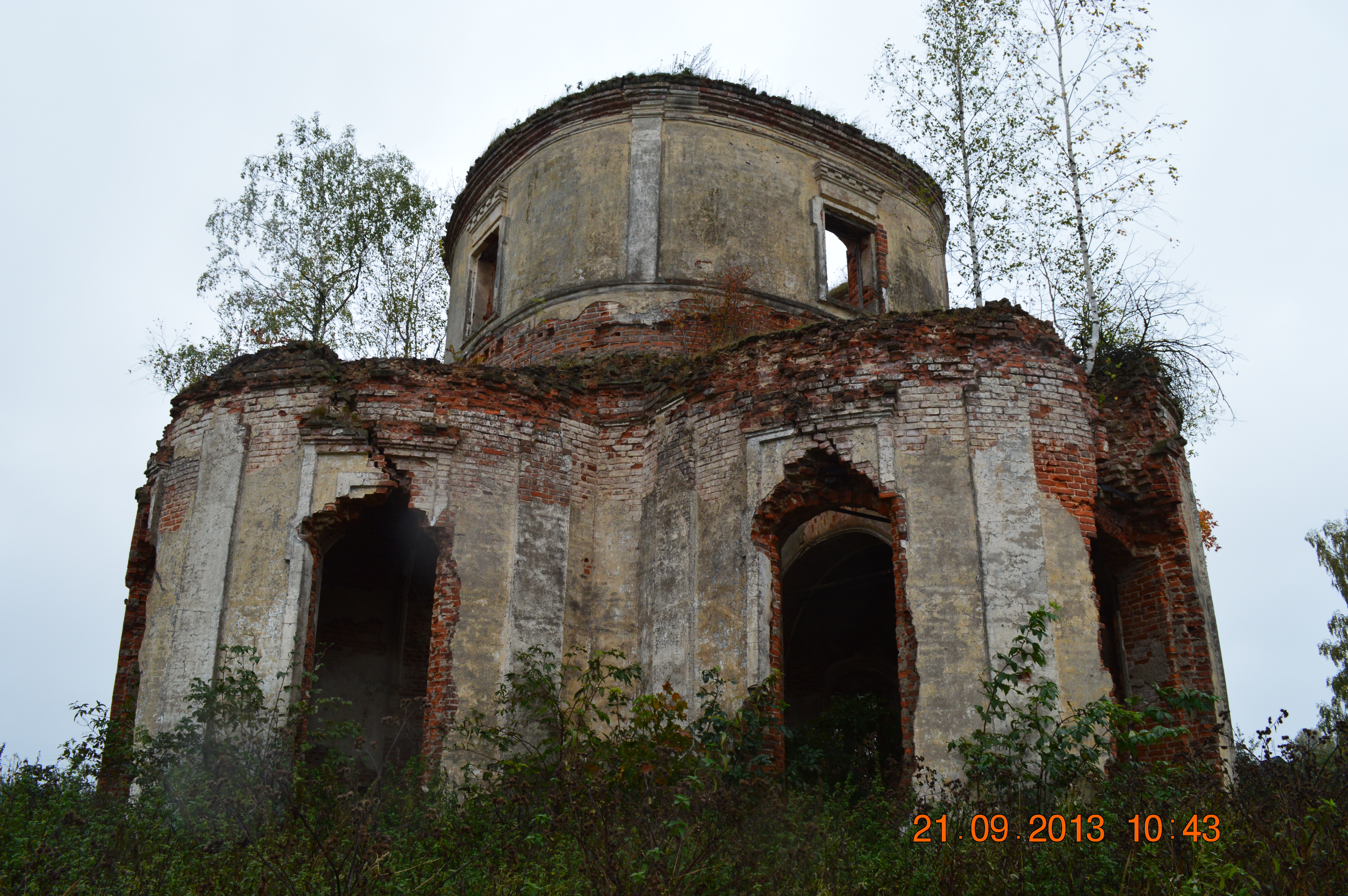
Dormition Church, Palkino

In Krasny, there is a local museum.
