= Desnogorsk =

Town in Smolensk Oblast, Russia

Desnogorsk Десногорск
- Town
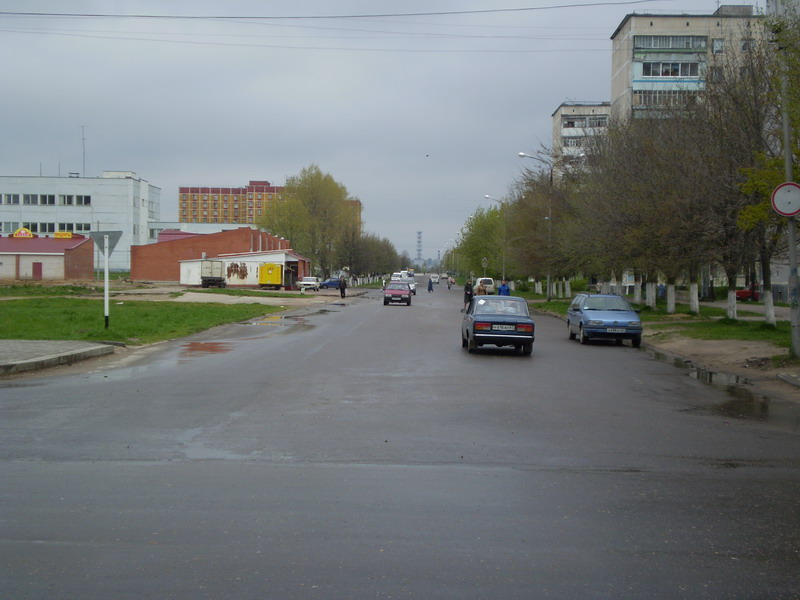

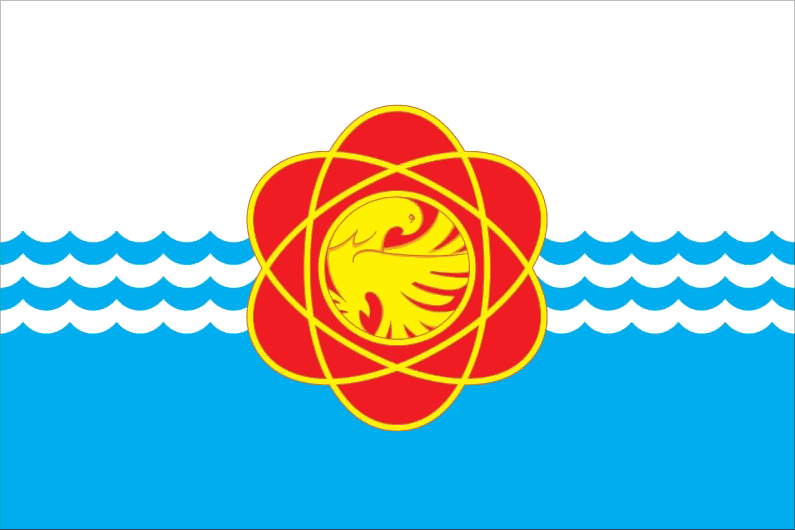
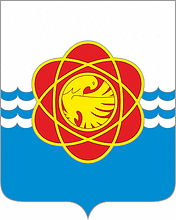
- Flag Coat of arms
- Interactive map of Desnogorsk
- Location of Desnogorsk Desnogorsk (Smolensk Oblast)
- Coordinates: 54°09′N 33°17′E
- Country: Russia
- Federal subject: Smolensk Oblast
- urban-type settlement: 1974
- Town status since: 1989

Government
  - Leader: Mikhail Khobotov
- Elevation: 200 m (660 ft)

Population (2010 Census)
  - Total: 29,677
  - Estimate (2024): 24,618 (−17%)

Administrative status
  - Subordinated to: Desnogorsk Urban Okrug
  - Capital of: Desnogorsk Urban Okrug

Municipal status
  - Urban okrug: Desnogorsk Urban Okrug
  - Capital of: Desnogorsk Urban Okrug
- Time zone: UTC+3 (MSK)
- Postal codes: 216400, 216401
- OKTMO ID: 66710000001
- Website: admin-smolensk.ru/~desnogorsk/

Desnogorsk (Russian: Десного́рск) is a town in Smolensk Oblast, Russia, located on the right bank of the Desna River 153 kilometers (95 mi) southeast of Smolensk. Population: 29,677 (2010 census); 32,070 (2002 census); 32,302 (1989 Soviet census). Desnogorsk is located on the banks of the Desna River and is surrounded by Roslavlsky District.

Historical population
Year	Pop.	±%
1979	9,830	—
1989	32,302	+228.6%
2002	32,070	−0.7%
2010	31,100	−3.0%
2021	25,345	−18.5%
Source: Census data

== Geography ==
=== Climate ===
Desnogorsk has a warm-summer humid continental climate (Dfb in the Köppen climate classification).

Climate data for Desnogorsk
Month	Jan	Feb	Mar	Apr	May	Jun	Jul	Aug	Sep	Oct	Nov	Dec	Year
Mean daily maximum °C (°F)	−4.6 (23.7)	−3.7 (25.3)	1.8 (35.2)	11 (52)	17.7 (63.9)	20.7 (69.3)	23.2 (73.8)	21.9 (71.4)	16 (61)	8.8 (47.8)	2.3 (36.1)	−1.8 (28.8)	9.4 (49.0)
Daily mean °C (°F)	−6.6 (20.1)	−6.1 (21.0)	−1.4 (29.5)	6.5 (43.7)	13.4 (56.1)	16.9 (62.4)	19.4 (66.9)	18 (64)	12.5 (54.5)	6.2 (43.2)	0.6 (33.1)	−3.6 (25.5)	6.3 (43.3)
Mean daily minimum °C (°F)	−8.9 (16.0)	−8.8 (16.2)	−4.9 (23.2)	1.5 (34.7)	8.3 (46.9)	12.1 (53.8)	15 (59)	13.7 (56.7)	8.9 (48.0)	3.4 (38.1)	−1.3 (29.7)	−5.6 (21.9)	2.8 (37.0)
Average precipitation mm (inches)	52 (2.0)	45 (1.8)	46 (1.8)	48 (1.9)	72 (2.8)	83 (3.3)	94 (3.7)	79 (3.1)	63 (2.5)	69 (2.7)	54 (2.1)	51 (2.0)	756 (29.7)
Source: https://en.climate-data.org/asia/russian-federation/smolensk-oblast/desnogorsk-46612/

== History ==
It was founded as a settlement around the Smolensk Nuclear Power Plant in 1974 (construction started in 1972). It belonged to Roslavlsky District. It was granted town status in 1989 and simultaneously declared to be the town of oblast significance.

== Administrative and municipal status ==
Within the framework of administrative divisions, it is, together with one rural locality, incorporated as Desnogorsk Urban Okrug—an administrative unit with the status equal to that of the districts. As a municipal division, this administrative unit also has urban okrug status.

== Economy ==
=== Industry ===
Smolensk Nuclear Power Plant is the main enterprise in Desnogorsk.

=== Transportation ===
The Russian route A130, formerly A101, connecting Moscow with the border of Belarus and continuing to Babruysk, passes close to Desnogorsk. There is also a connection to the road between Roslavl and Yelnya which continues further via Dorogobuzh and Safonovo to the M1 highway.

There is a railroad in Desnogorsk but no passenger traffic. The closest railway station with passenger traffic is Roslavl I.
