= Safonovo, Safonovsky District, Smolensk Oblast =

Town in Smolensk Oblast, Russia

Safonovo Сафоново
- Town
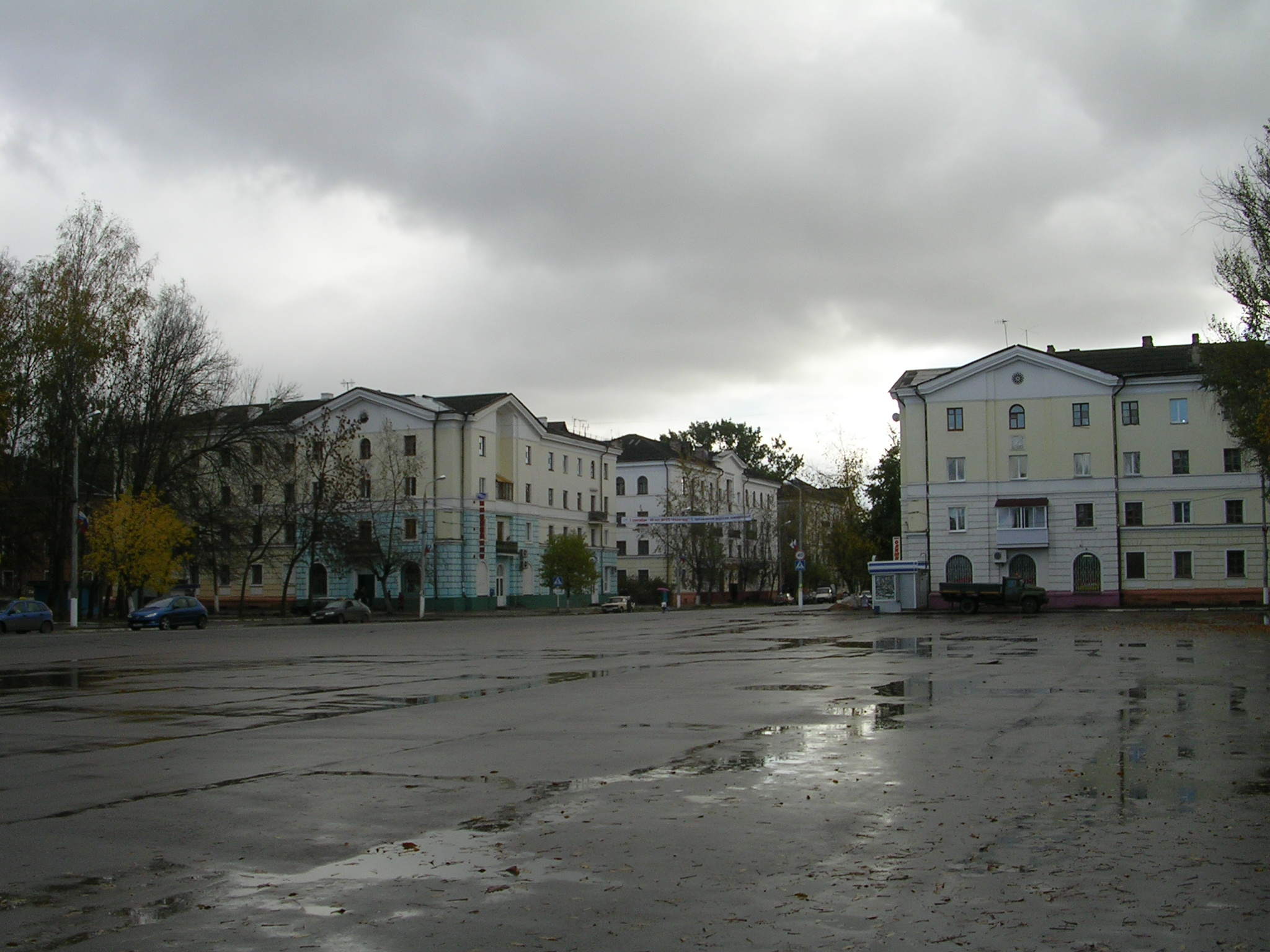
- Lenina Street in Safonovo

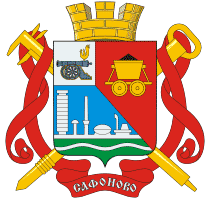
- Coat of arms
- Interactive map of Safonovo
- Location of Safonovo Safonovo (Smolensk Oblast)
- Coordinates: 55°07′N 33°15′E
- Country: Russia
- Federal subject: Smolensk Oblast
- Administrative district: Safonovsky District
- Urban settlementSelsoviet: Safonovskoye
- First mentioned: 1859
- Town status since: 1952

Area
  - Total: 30.43 km^{2} (11.75 sq mi)
- Elevation: 213 m (699 ft)

Population (2010 Census)
  - Total: 46,116
  - Estimate (2025): 36,779 (−20.2%)
  - Density: 1,515/km^{2} (3,925/sq mi)

Administrative status
  - Capital of: Safonovsky District, Safonovskoye Urban Settlement

Municipal status
  - Municipal district: Safonovsky Municipal District
  - Urban settlement: Safonovskoye Urban Settlement
  - Capital of: Safonovsky Municipal District, Safonovskoye Urban Settlement
- Time zone: UTC+3 (MSK)
- Postal codes: 215500, 215502, 215503, 215505, 215506, 215569
- OKTMO ID: 66641101001

Safonovo (Russian: Сафо́ново) is a town and the administrative center of Safonovsky District in Smolensk Oblast, Russia, located on the Vopets River 102 kilometers (63 mi) northeast of Smolensk, the administrative center of the oblast. Population: 46,116 (2010 census); 48,209 (2002 census); 56,571 (1989 Soviet census).

== Geography ==
The town is located on the Vopets River 102 kilometers (63 mi) northeast of Smolensk, the administrative center of the oblast.

=== Climate ===
Safonovo has a warm-summer humid continental climate (Dfb in the Köppen climate classification).

Climate data for Safonovo
Month	Jan	Feb	Mar	Apr	May	Jun	Jul	Aug	Sep	Oct	Nov	Dec	Year
Mean daily maximum °C (°F)	−4.8 (23.4)	−3.9 (25.0)	1.6 (34.9)	10.6 (51.1)	17 (63)	20.2 (68.4)	22.8 (73.0)	21.3 (70.3)	15.6 (60.1)	8.2 (46.8)	2.1 (35.8)	−2 (28)	9.1 (48.3)
Daily mean °C (°F)	−6.8 (19.8)	−6.5 (20.3)	−1.8 (28.8)	6.1 (43.0)	12.8 (55.0)	16.3 (61.3)	19 (66)	17.4 (63.3)	12 (54)	5.7 (42.3)	0.3 (32.5)	−3.8 (25.2)	5.9 (42.6)
Mean daily minimum °C (°F)	−9.4 (15.1)	−9.5 (14.9)	−5.6 (21.9)	0.9 (33.6)	7.4 (45.3)	11.4 (52.5)	14.4 (57.9)	13.1 (55.6)	8.2 (46.8)	3 (37)	−1.5 (29.3)	−5.8 (21.6)	2.2 (36.0)
Average precipitation mm (inches)	51 (2.0)	45 (1.8)	44 (1.7)	45 (1.8)	76 (3.0)	83 (3.3)	91 (3.6)	80 (3.1)	65 (2.6)	69 (2.7)	55 (2.2)	50 (2.0)	754 (29.8)
Source: https://en.climate-data.org/asia/russian-federation/smolensk-oblast/safonovo-32856/

== History ==
The village of Safonovo was first mentioned in 1859. In 1918, it became the administrative center of Safonovskaya Volost, and since 1929 it served as the administrative center of Safonovsky District. In the 1930s, large deposits of brown coal were discovered there. In 1938, the village was granted urban-type settlement status, and in 1952—town status.

== Administrative and municipal status ==
Within the framework of administrative divisions, Safonovo serves as the administrative center of Safonovsky District. As an administrative division, it is incorporated within Safonovsky District as Safonovskoye Urban Settlement. As a municipal division, this administrative unit also has urban settlement status and is a part of Safonovsky Municipal District.

== Economy ==
Safonovo Electric Machines Factory—a manufacturer of powerful electric motors and generators, and PO Avangard—a significant producer of parts made out of glass- and carbon-fiber-reinforced polymers, are located in the town.
