= Vyazemsky District, Smolensk Oblast =

Vyazemsky District Вяземский район (Russian)
- District
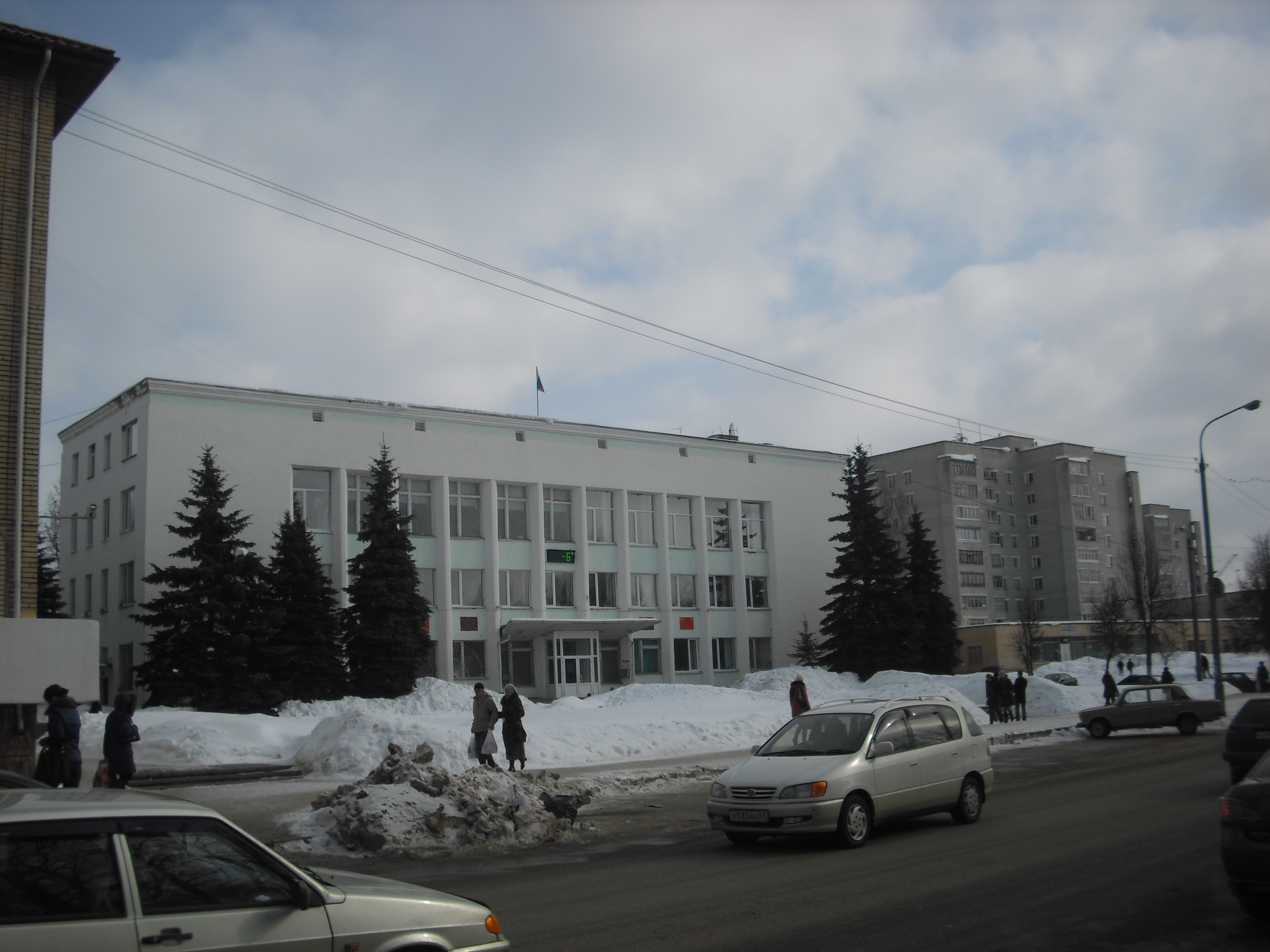
- Vyazemsky District Administration building

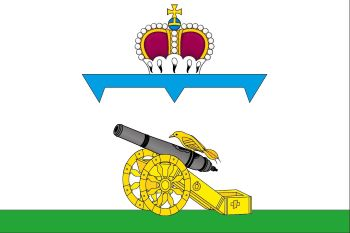
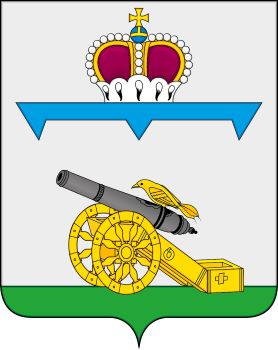
- Flag Coat of arms
- Location of Vyazemsky District in Smolensk Oblast
- Coordinates: 55°13′N 34°18′E
- Country: Russia
- Federal subject: Smolensk Oblast
- Established: 1929
- Administrative center: Vyazma

Area
  - Total: 3,337.90 km^{2} (1,288.77 sq mi)

Population (2010 Census)
  - Total: 80,436
  - Density: 24.098/km^{2} (62.413/sq mi)
  - Urban: 71.0%
  - Rural: 29.0%

Administrative structure
  - Administrative divisions: 1 Urban settlements, 22 Rural settlements
  - Inhabited localities: 1 cities/towns, 331 rural localities

Municipal structure
  - Municipally incorporated as: Vyazemsky Municipal District
  - Municipal divisions: 1 urban settlements, 22 rural settlements
- Time zone: UTC+3 (MSK)
- OKTMO ID: 66605000
- Website: http://www.vyazma.ru/

Vyazemsky District (Russian: Вя́земский райо́н) is an administrative and municipal district (raion), one of the twenty-five in Smolensk Oblast, Russia. It is located in the northeast of the oblast. The area of the district is 3,337.90 square kilometers (1,288.77 sq mi). Its administrative center is the town of Vyazma. Population: 80,436 (2010 Census); 81,305 (2002 census); 25,106 (1989 Soviet census). The population of Vyazma accounts for 71.0% of the district's total population.
