= Kholm-Zhirkovsky District =

Kholm-Zhirkovsky District Холм-Жирковский район (Russian)
- District
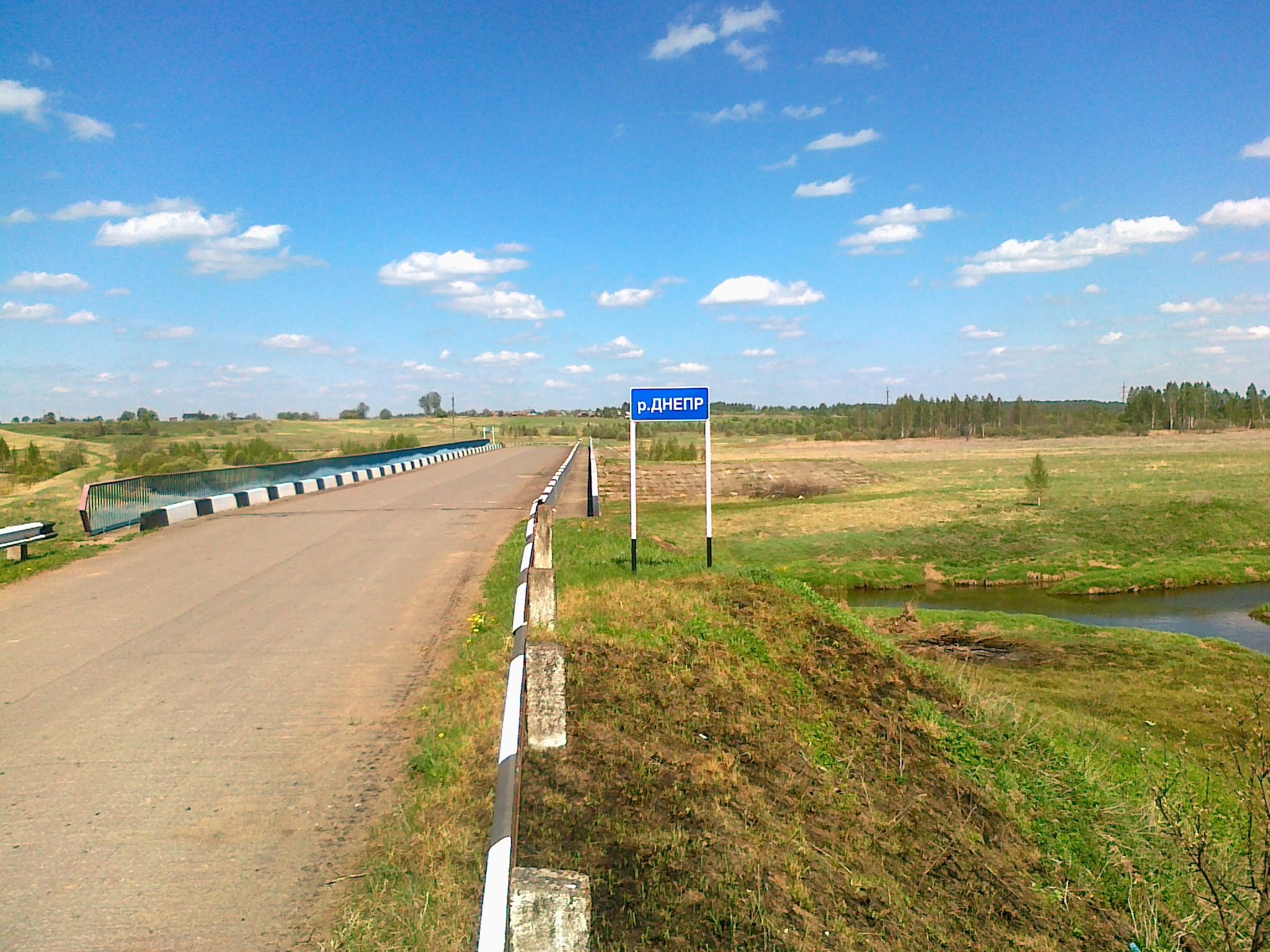
- Bridge over Dnieper River, Nakhimovskoe, Kholm-Zhirkovsky District

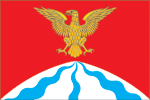
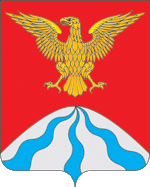
- Flag Coat of arms
- Location of Kholm-Zhirkovsky District in Smolensk Oblast
- Coordinates: 55°30′53″N 33°29′56″E
- Country: Russia
- Federal subject: Smolensk Oblast
- Established: 1 October 1929
- Administrative center: Kholm-Zhirkovsky

Area
  - Total: 2,033.40 km^{2} (785.10 sq mi)

Population (2010 Census)
  - Total: 10,717
  - Density: 5.2705/km^{2} (13.650/sq mi)
  - Urban: 32.6%
  - Rural: 67.4%

Administrative structure
  - Administrative divisions: 1 Urban settlements, 14 Rural settlements
  - Inhabited localities: 1 urban-type settlements, 177 rural localities

Municipal structure
  - Municipally incorporated as: Kholm-Zhirkovsky Municipal District
  - Municipal divisions: 1 urban settlements, 14 rural settlements
- Time zone: UTC+3 (MSK)
- OKTMO ID: 66654000
- Website: https://holm.admin-smolensk.ru/

Kholm-Zhirkovsky District (Russian: Холм-Жирковский райо́н) is an administrative and municipal district (raion), one of the twenty-five in Smolensk Oblast, Russia. It is located in the north of the oblast. The area of the district is 2,033.40 square kilometers (785.10 sq mi). Its administrative center is the urban locality (a settlement) of Kholm-Zhirkovsky. Population: 10,717 (2010 Census); 12,815 (2002 census); 15,966 (1989 Soviet census). The population of the administrative center accounts for 32.6% of the district's total population.
