= Safonovsky District =

Safonovsky District Сафоновский район (Russian)
- District
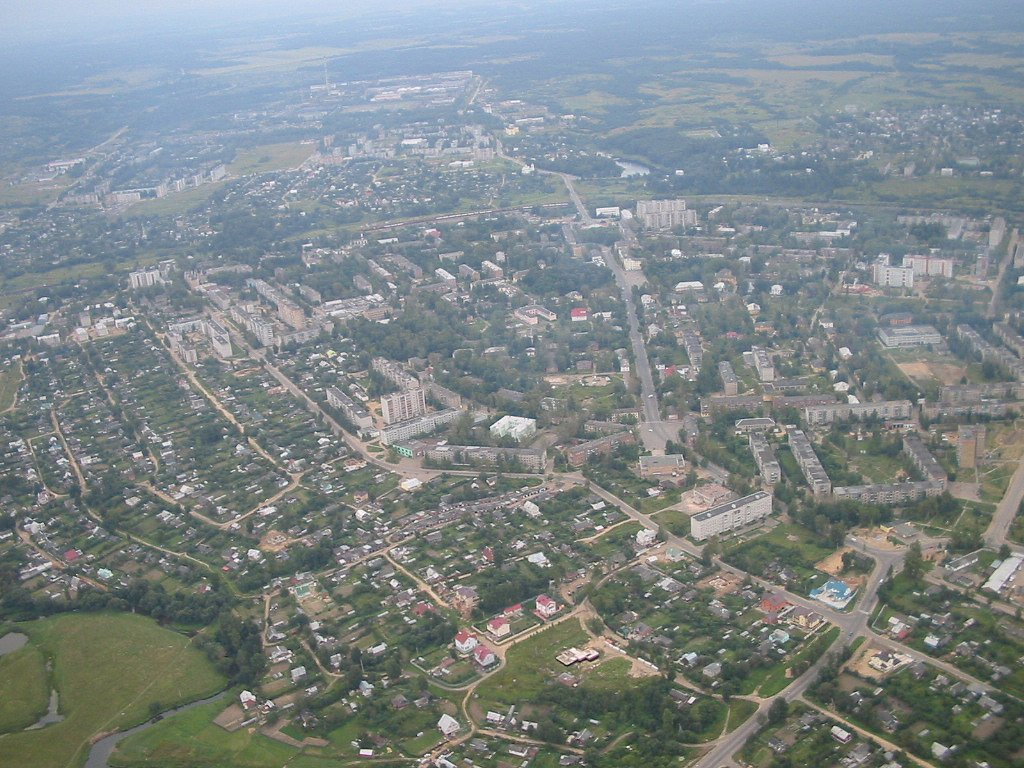
- View of Safonovo, Safonovsky District

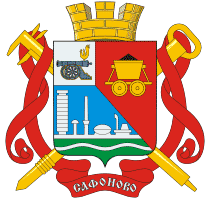
- Coat of arms
- Location of Safonovsky District in Smolensk Oblast
- Coordinates: 55°06′N 33°15′E
- Country: Russia
- Federal subject: Smolensk Oblast
- Established: 1929
- Administrative center: Safonovo

Area
  - Total: 2,258.46 km^{2} (872.00 sq mi)

Population (2010 Census)
  - Total: 61,572
  - Density: 27.263/km^{2} (70.610/sq mi)
  - Urban: 77.6%
  - Rural: 22.4%

Administrative structure
  - Administrative divisions: 1 Urban settlements, 17 Rural settlements
  - Inhabited localities: 1 cities/towns, 226 rural localities

Municipal structure
  - Municipally incorporated as: Safonovsky Municipal District
  - Municipal divisions: 1 urban settlements, 17 rural settlements
- Time zone: UTC+3 (MSK)
- OKTMO ID: 66641000
- Website: http://www.admin-safonovo.ru

Safonovsky District (Russian: Сафо́новский райо́н) is an administrative and municipal district (raion), one of the twenty-five in Smolensk Oblast, Russia. It is located in the northern central part of the oblast. The area of the district is 2,258.46 square kilometers (872.00 sq mi). Its administrative center is the town of Safonovo. Population: 61,572 (2010 Census); 65,251 (2002 census); 17,115 (1989 Soviet census). The population of Safonovo accounts for 74.9% of the district's total population.
