= Tyomkinsky District =

Tyomkinsky District Тёмкинский район (Russian)
- District
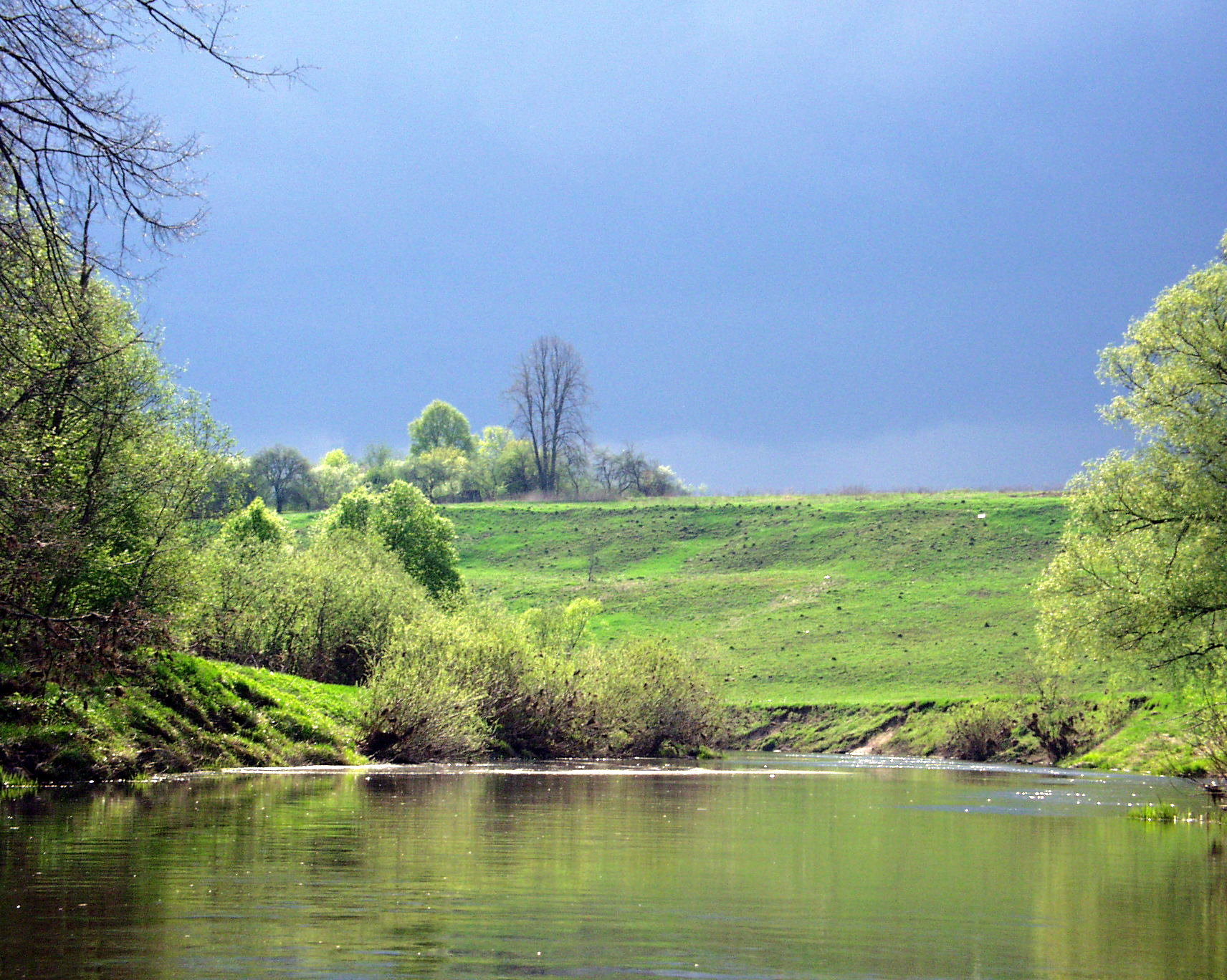
- Vorya River, Tyomkinsky District

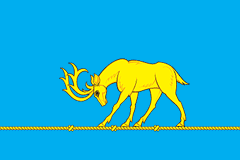
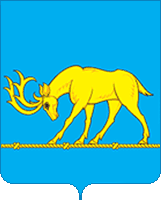
- Flag Coat of arms
- Location of Tyomkinsky District in Smolensk Oblast
- Coordinates: 55°04′39″N 35°00′43″E
- Country: Russia
- Federal subject: Smolensk Oblast
- Established: 1929
- Administrative center: Tyomkino

Area
  - Total: 1,324.22 km^{2} (511.28 sq mi)

Population (2010 Census)
  - Total: 6,348
  - Density: 4.794/km^{2} (12.42/sq mi)
  - Urban: 0%
  - Rural: 100%

Administrative structure
  - Administrative divisions: 10 rural settlement
  - Inhabited localities: 131 rural localities

Municipal structure
  - Municipally incorporated as: Tyomkinsky Municipal District
  - Municipal divisions: 0 urban settlements, 10 rural settlements
- Time zone: UTC+3 (MSK)
- OKTMO ID: 66648000
- Website: http://admin.smolensk.ru/~temkino/

Tyomkinsky District (Russian: Тёмкинский райо́н) is an administrative and municipal district (raion), one of the twenty-five in Smolensk Oblast, Russia. It is located in the northeast of the oblast. The area of the district is 1,324.22 square kilometers (511.28 sq mi). Its administrative center is the rural locality (a selo) of Tyomkino. Population: 6,348 (2010 Census); 6,916 (2002 census); 8,160 (1989 Soviet census). The population of the administrative center accounts for 38.0% of the district's total population.
