= 2023 Smolensk Oblast gubernatorial election =

← 2020	8–10 September 2023	2028 →
- Turnout: 33.69%
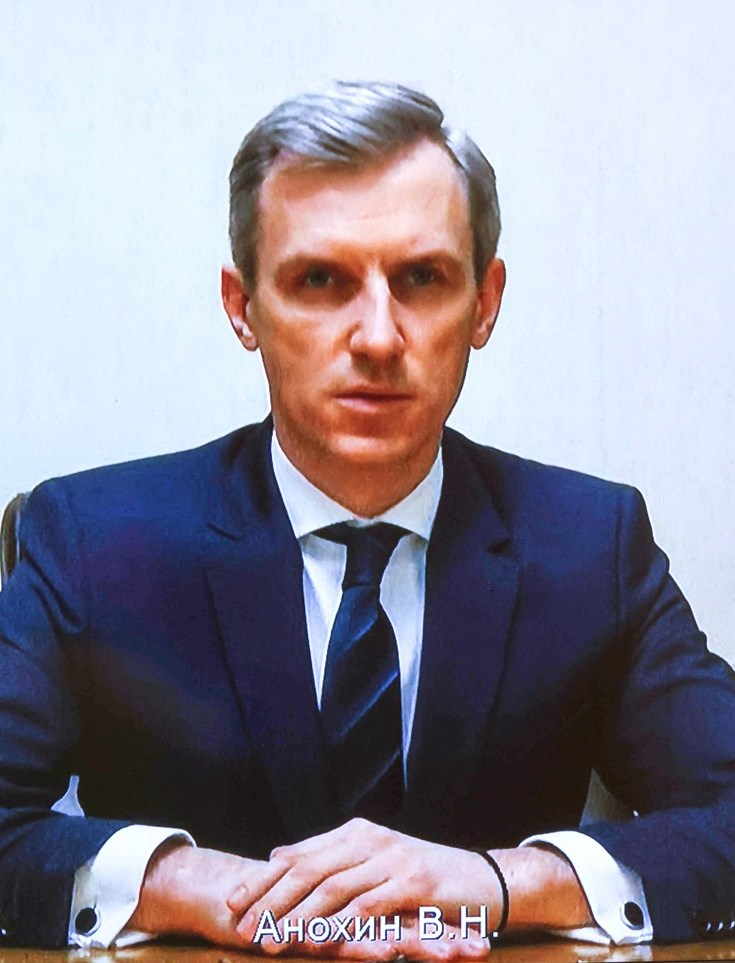
		CPRF
Candidate	Vasily Anokhin	Andrey Maksimov
Party	United Russia	CPRF
Popular vote	216,767	14,352
Percentage	86.62%	5.74%
Governor before election
Vasily Anokhin (acting)
Independent
Governor-elect
Vasily Anokhin
United Russia

The 2023 Smolensk Oblast gubernatorial election took place on 8–10 September 2023, on common election day, coinciding with the Smolensk Oblast Duma election. Acting Governor Vasily Anokhin was elected for a full term.

== Background ==
State Duma member Alexey Ostrovsky was appointed acting Governor of Smolensk Oblast in April 2012 after the resignation of Sergey Antufyev. Ostrovsky was unanimously elected for a full term a week later by Smolensk Oblast Duma, becoming first governor from LDPR since 1999, when then-Governor of Pskov Oblast Yevgeny Mikhailov switched to Unity. Ostrovsky was the only governor from the party until 2018, when Vladimir Sipyagin and Sergey Furgal were elected governors of Vladimir Oblast and Khabarovsk Krai respectively. In May 2015 Ostrovsky asked President Vladimir Putin for early resignation, he was immediately reappointed as acting Governor of Smolensk Oblast and won September 2015 gubernatorial election with 65.2% of the vote. Governor Ostrovsky won a 2020 election for a third gubernatorial term with 56.5%.

On 17 March 2023, unexpectedly for LDPR and most observers, Alexey Ostrovsky asked for resignation after serving more than 10 years in office. President Putin approved the request and replaced Ostrovsky with Vasily Anokhin, Director of the Department of Regional Development at the Apparatus of the Government of Russia. Anokhin is viewed as ally of Deputy Prime Minister Marat Khusnullin, whose secretariat acting governor previously headed.

== Candidates ==
In Smolensk Oblast candidates for Governor can be nominated only by registered political parties, self-nomination is not possible. However, candidates are not obliged to be members of the nominating party. Candidate for Governor of Smolensk Oblast should be a Russian citizen and at least 30 years old. Candidates for Governor should not have a foreign citizenship or residence permit. Each candidate in order to be registered is required to collect at least 7% of signatures of members and heads of municipalities. Also gubernatorial candidates present 3 candidacies to the Federation Council and election winner later appoints one of the presented candidates.

=== Registered ===
- Vasily Anokhin (United Russia), acting Governor of Smolensk Oblast (2023–present), former Director of the Department of Regional Development of the Government of the Russian Federation (2021–2023)
- Mikhail Kovalyov (LDPR), Member of Smolensk City Council (2020–present), aide to State Duma member Sergey Leonov
- Andrey Maksimov (CPRF), Deputy Chairman of the Smolensk City Council (2020–present), Member of City Council (2015–present), aide to State Duma member Svetlana Savitskaya
- Roman Shklavets (Communists of Russia), nephrologist

=== Did not file ===
- Dmitry Vasilyev (RPPSS), businessman, retired FSB officer
- Igor Yasinsky (Rodina), military pensioner, foundation president

=== Declined ===
- Vladislav Davankov (New People), Deputy Chairman of the State Duma (2021—present) (running for Mayor of Moscow)
- Andrey Ivanov (SR–ZP), dentist
- Sergey Leonov (LDPR), Member of State Duma (2021–present)

=== Candidates for Federation Council ===
Incumbent Senator Nina Kulikovskikh (United Russia) was not renominated.

- Vasily Anokhin (United Russia):
  - Mikhail Artyomenkov, Rector of Smolensk State University (2017–present)
  - Olga Ivanova, lyceum director
  - Ruslan Smashnyov, Deputy Governor of Smolensk Oblast (2020–present; First Deputy Governor in 2021–2023)

== Finances ==
All sums are in rubles.

Financial Report	Source	Anokhin	Kovalyov	Maksimov	Shklavets	Vasilyev	Yasinsky
First		30,000	18,600	200,000	33,200	0	1,000
Final		40,030,000	1,518,000	458,000	33,200	0	1,000

== Results ==
Summary of the 8–10 September 2023 Smolensk Oblast gubernatorial election results
Candidate	Party	Votes	%
Vasily Anokhin (incumbent)	United Russia	216,767	86.62
Andrey Maksimov	Communist Party	14,352	5.74
Mikhail Kovalyov	Liberal Democratic Party	10,004	4.00
Roman Shklavets	Communists of Russia	3,410	1.36
Valid votes		244,533	97.72
Blank ballots		5,712	2.28
Total		250,245	100.00
Turnout		250,245	33.69
Registered voters		742,756	100.00

Governor Anokhin appointed Deputy Governor Ruslan Smashnyov (Independent) to the Federation Council, replacing incumbent Nina Kulikovskikh (United Russia).

== See also ==
- 2023 Russian regional elections
