= 2023 Smolensk Oblast Duma election =

2023 Russian election

← 2018	8–10 September 2023	2028 →
- Turnout: 33.68%
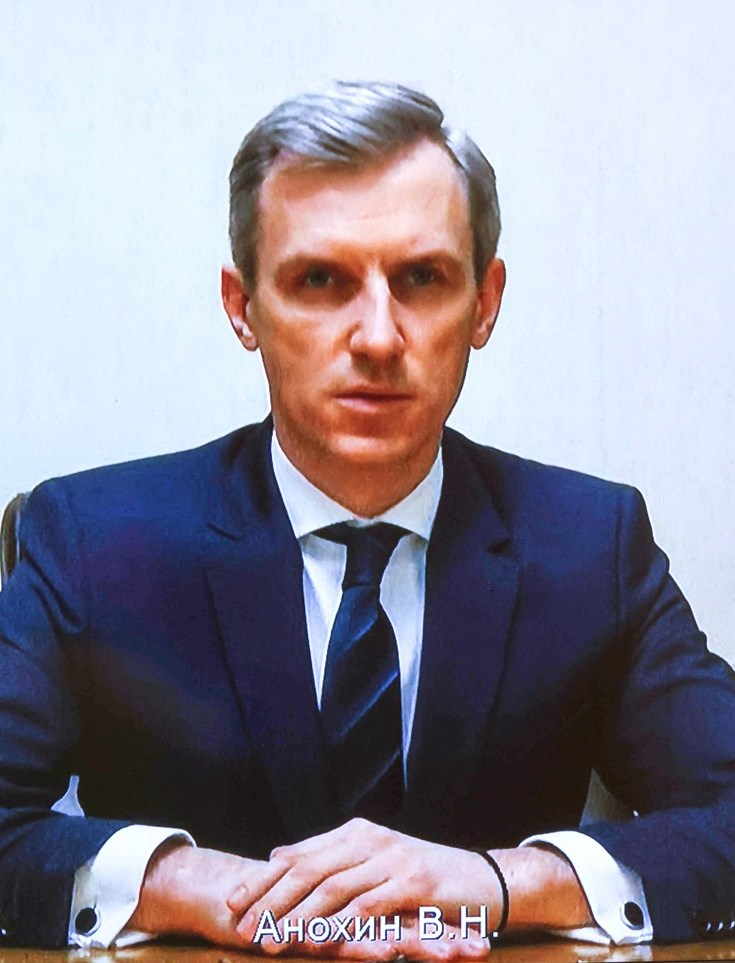

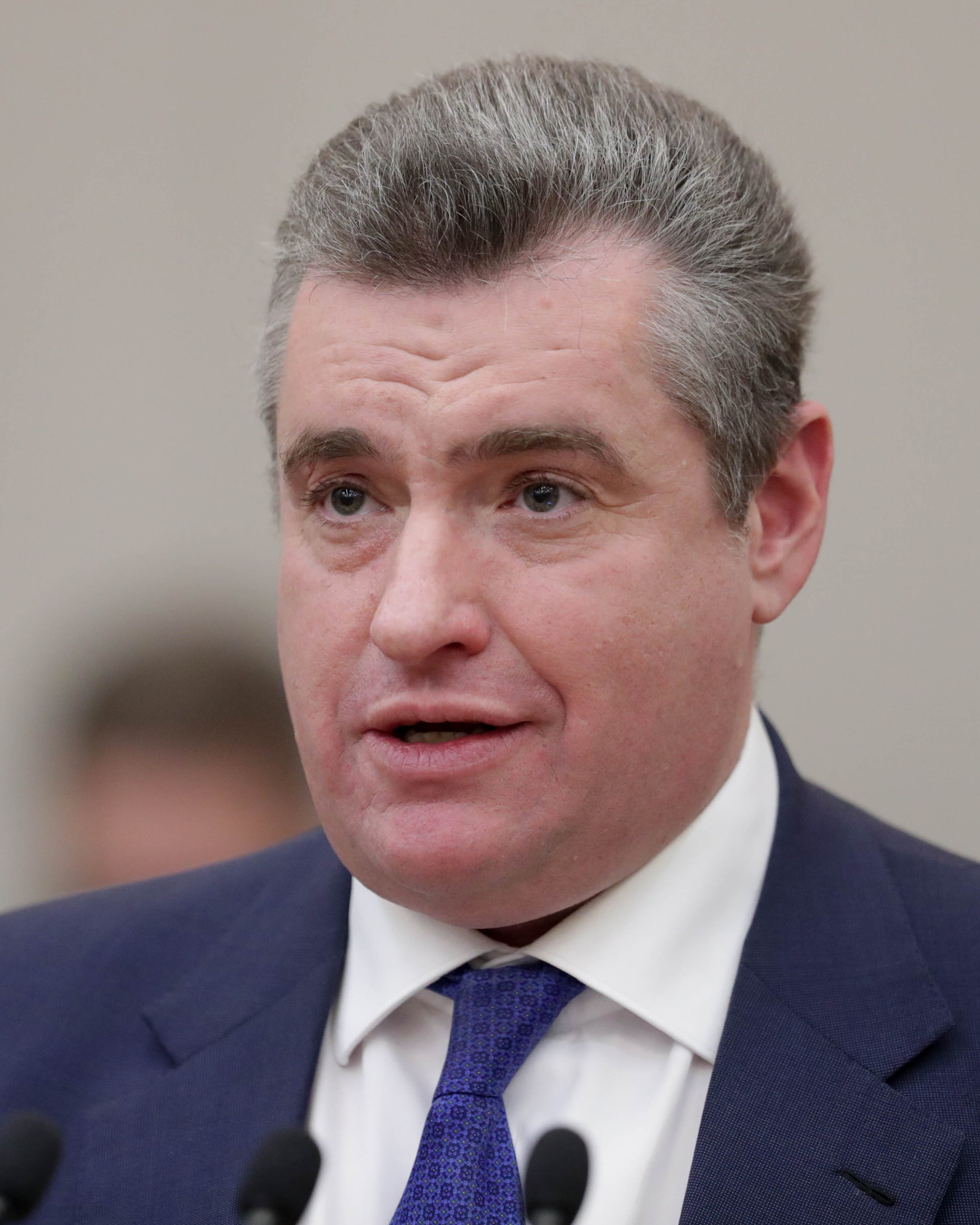
	Majority party	Minority party	Third party
			CPRF
Candidate	Vasily Anokhin	Leonid Slutsky	Valery Kuznetsov
Leader	Dmitry Medvedev	Leonid Slutsky	Gennady Zyuganov
Party	United Russia	LDPR	CPRF
Last election	26 seats, 36.34%	6 seats, 19.83%	12 seats, 22.91%
Seats won	41	4	3
Seat change	▲15	▼2	▼9
Popular vote	143,562	28,150	24,583
Percentage	57.39%	11.25%	9.83%
Swing	▲21.05%	▼8.58%	▼13.08%
	Fourth party	Fifth party	Sixth party
	RPPSS	SR-ZP	NL
Candidate	Dmitry Vasilyev	Andrey Ivanov	Aleksandr Zhustaryov
Leader	Vladimir Burakov	Sergey Mironov	Aleksey Nechayev
Party	Party of Pensioners	SR-ZP	New People
Last election	2 seats, 9.29%	2 seats, 7.79%	Did not exist
Seats won	0	0	0
Seat change	▼2	▼2	Did not exist
Popular vote	11,410	10,814	10,539
Percentage	4.56%	4.32%	4.21%
Swing	▼4.73%	▼3.47%	Did not exist

The 2023 Smolensk Oblast Duma election took place on 8–10 September 2023, on common election day, coinciding with 2023 Smolensk Oblast gubernatorial election. All 48 seats in the Oblast Duma were up for reelection.

== Electoral system ==
Under current election laws, the Oblast Duma is elected for a term of five years, with parallel voting. 16 seats are elected by party-list proportional representation with a 5% electoral threshold, with the other half elected in 32 single-member constituencies by first-past-the-post voting. Until 2023 the number of mandates allocated in proportional and majoritarian parts were standing at 24 each. Seats in the proportional part are allocated using the Imperiali quota, modified to ensure that every party list, which passes the threshold, receives at least one mandate.

== Candidates ==
=== Party lists ===
To register regional lists of candidates, parties need to collect 0.5% of signatures of all registered voters in Smolensk Oblast.

The following parties were relieved from the necessity to collect signatures:

- United Russia
- Communist Party of the Russian Federation
- A Just Russia — Patriots — For Truth
- Liberal Democratic Party of Russia
- New People
- Russian Party of Pensioners for Social Justice

№	Party	Oblast-wide list	Candidates	Territorial groups	Status
1	Liberal Democratic Party	Leonid Slutsky • Andrey Borisov • Mikhail Kovalyov	44	16	Registered
2	Communists of Russia	Roman Shklavets • Anna Frolova • Vladimir Zagryadsky	19	16	Registered
3	Communist Party	Valery Kuznetsov • Andrey Mitrofanenkov • Aleksandr Stepchenkov	38	16	Registered
4	The Greens	Artur Redchenkov • Tatyana Gomareva	18	16	Registered
5	New People	Aleksandr Zhustaryov • Aleksey Voytov • Oleg Kletny	30	15	Registered
6	A Just Russia – For Truth	Andrey Ivanov	30	16	Registered
7	United Russia	Vasily Anokhin • Natalya Polushkina • Igor Lyakhov	51	16	Registered
8	Party of Pensioners	Dmitry Vasilyev • Svetlana Vtorova • Igor Pushkarev	39	16	Registered
	Yabloko				Failed to qualify
	Rodina				Failed the certification

New People, Communists of Russia and The Greens will take part in Smolensk Oblast legislative election for the first time.

=== Single-mandate constituencies ===
32 single-mandate constituencies were formed in Smolensk Oblast, an increase of 8 seats since last redistricting in 2018. To register candidates in single-mandate constituencies need to collect 3% of signatures of registered voters in the constituency.

Number of candidates in single-mandate constituencies
Party	Candidates	
Party	Nominated	Registered
United Russia	32	31
Communist Party	30	30
Liberal Democratic Party	32	32
Party of Pensioners	17	17
A Just Russia — For Truth	30	29
New People	17	14
Communists of Russia	21	16
Independent	1	0
Total	180	169

== Results ==
=== Results by party lists ===
Summary of the 8–10 September 2023 Smolensk Oblast Duma election results
Party	Party list					Constituency		Total	
Party	Votes	%	±pp	Seats	+/–	Seats	+/–	Seats	+/–
United Russia	143,562	57.39	▲21.05%	12	▲3	29	▲12	41	▲15
Liberal Democratic Party	28,150	11.25	▼8.58%	2	▼3	2	▲1	4	▼2
Communist Party	24,583	9.83	▼13.08%	2	▼4	1	▼5	3	▼9
Party of Pensioners	11,410	4.56	▼4.73%	0	▼2	0	Steady	0	▼2
A Just Russia — For Truth	10,814	4.32	▼3.47%	0	▼2	0	Steady	0	▼2
New People	10,539	4.21	New	0	New	0	New	0	New
Communists of Russia	10,142	4.05	New	0	New	0	New	0	New
The Greens	2,837	1.13	New	0	New	–	–	0	New
Invalid ballots	8,130	3.25	▼0.60%	—	—	—	—	—	—
Total	250,167	100.00	—	16	▼8	32	▲8	48	Steady
Turnout	250,167	33.68	▲10.01%	—	—	—	—	—	—
Registered voters	742,694	100.00	—	—	—	—	—	—	—

Igor Lyakhov (United Russia) was re-elected as Chairman of the Oblast Duma, while Oblast Duma member Artyom Malashchenkov (United Russia) was appointed to the Federation Council, replacing incumbent Senator Irina Kozhanova (LDPR).

=== Results in single-member constituencies ===
==== District 1 ====
Summary of the 8–10 September 2023 Smolensk Oblast Duma election in District 1
Candidate	Party	Votes	%
Dmitry Novikov (incumbent)	United Russia	5,375	63.54%
Nikolay Goncharov	Liberal Democratic Party	644	7.61%
Ilya Karpusha	Communist Party	545	6.44%
Oleg Yakushenkov	A Just Russia – For Truth	453	5.36%
Denis Savkin	New People	386	4.56%
Anastasia Zhukova	Communists of Russia	358	4.23%
Timofey Makeyenkov	Party of Pensioners	267	3.16%
Total		8,459	100%

==== District 2 ====
Summary of the 8–10 September 2023 Smolensk Oblast Duma election in District 2
Candidate	Party	Votes	%
Sergey Esalnek	United Russia	2,659	44.94%
Sergey Susaykov	Communist Party	826	13.96%
Dmitry Kovalev	A Just Russia – For Truth	784	13.25%
Nadezhda Berdnikova	Liberal Democratic Party	574	9.70%
Leonid Panfilov	Communists of Russia	422	7.13%
Nikita Rosin	New People	338	5.71%
Total		5,917	100%

==== District 3 ====
Summary of the 8–10 September 2023 Smolensk Oblast Duma election in District 3
Candidate	Party	Votes	%
Semyon Zharikov	United Russia	2,493	40.45%
Stepan Yemelyanov	Communist Party	1,129	18.32%
Maksim Shilko	A Just Russia – For Truth	663	10.76%
Andrey Filippov	New People	456	7.40%
Aleksandr Utkin	Party of Pensioners	413	6.70%
Dmitry Yurchenkov	Liberal Democratic Party	337	5.47%
Anna Dubasova	Communists of Russia	301	4.88%
Total		6,163	100%

==== District 4 ====
Summary of the 8–10 September 2023 Smolensk Oblast Duma election in District 4
Candidate	Party	Votes	%
Valery Razuvayev (incumbent)	United Russia	4,114	55.27%
Andrey Mitrofanenkov	Communist Party	984	13.22%
Aleksey Ovchinnikov	New People	655	8.80%
Lyudmila Gorbatova	Liberal Democratic Party	512	6.88%
Pavel Kharlamov	Party of Pensioners	431	5.79%
Olga Matorina	Communists of Russia	360	4.84%
Total		7,443	100%

==== District 5 ====
Summary of the 8–10 September 2023 Smolensk Oblast Duma election in District 5
Candidate	Party	Votes	%
Nikolay Shumeyko	United Russia	3,672	53.18%
Artur Ageyenkov (incumbent)	Communist Party	847	12.27%
Aleksey Voytov	New People	613	8.88%
Margarita Volosenkova	A Just Russia – For Truth	601	8.70%
Anna Kanayeva	Liberal Democratic Party	321	4.65%
Snezhana Asriyeva	Communists of Russia	277	4.01%
Yevgeny Ageyenkov	Party of Pensioners	248	3.59%
Total		6,905	100%

==== District 6 ====
Summary of the 8–10 September 2023 Smolensk Oblast Duma election in District 6
Candidate	Party	Votes	%
Mikhail Leonenkov	United Russia	3,440	53.18%
Andrey Zakharov	Communist Party	990	15.30%
Alevtina Popova	New People	644	9.96%
Vyacheslav Yevdokimov	Party of Pensioners	501	7.74%
Dmitry Markov	Liberal Democratic Party	322	4.98%
Sergey Tatarintsev	A Just Russia – For Truth	222	3.43%
Total		6,469	100%

==== District 7 ====
Summary of the 8–10 September 2023 Smolensk Oblast Duma election in District 7
Candidate	Party	Votes	%
Aleksandr Zelensky	United Russia	2,531	39.50%
Oleg Kopyl	Communist Party	946	14.76%
Svetlana Obydennikova	A Just Russia – For Truth	865	13.50%
Aleksey Peshchanitsky	Liberal Democratic Party	712	11.11%
Oleg Kletny	New People	591	9.22%
Aleksey Kopachev	Communists of Russia	367	5.73%
Total		6,408	100%

==== District 8 ====
Summary of the 8–10 September 2023 Smolensk Oblast Duma election in District 8
Candidate	Party	Votes	%
Yevgeny Rudak	United Russia	3,274	57.20%
Andrey Shaposhnikov (incumbent)	Communist Party	905	15.81%
Pyotr Tikhomirov	Liberal Democratic Party	423	7.39%
Ksenia Komaseva	A Just Russia – For Truth	399	6.97%
Andrey Frolenkov	Party of Pensioners	396	6.92%
Total		5,724	100%

==== District 9 ====
Summary of the 8–10 September 2023 Smolensk Oblast Duma election in District 9
Candidate	Party	Votes	%
Sergey Nikolayev	United Russia	3,877	59.50%
Yevgeny Kotov (incumbent)	Communist Party	1,475	22.64%
Nadezhda Yakubova	Liberal Democratic Party	679	10.42%
Total		6,516	100%

==== District 10 ====
Summary of the 8–10 September 2023 Smolensk Oblast Duma election in District 10
Candidate	Party	Votes	%
Nikolay Martynov (incumbent)	United Russia	3,242	49.54%
Kirill Bystrov (incumbent)	Communist Party	930	14.21%
Galina Mikhalyova	New People	575	8.79%
Dmitry Lyubimov	Liberal Democratic Party	517	7.90%
Nadezhda Gulitskaya	Party of Pensioners	465	7.11%
Yulia Zuyeva	A Just Russia – For Truth	424	6.48%
Total		6,544	100%

==== District 11 ====
Summary of the 8–10 September 2023 Smolensk Oblast Duma election in District 11
Candidate	Party	Votes	%
Maksim Stepanov	Liberal Democratic Party	2,729	37.53%
Sergey Chuzhavko	United Russia	2,053	28.23%
Andrey Baranov	A Just Russia – For Truth	1,064	14.63%
Aleksandr Zhemchugov	Communist Party	909	12.50%
Total		7,272	100%

==== District 12 ====
Summary of the 8–10 September 2023 Smolensk Oblast Duma election in District 12
Candidate	Party	Votes	%
Artyom Malashchenkov	United Russia	4,628	57.78%
Oleg Aksenov	A Just Russia – For Truth	1,654	20.65%
Mikhail Grigoryants	Communist Party	517	6.45%
Anna Smolyakova	Liberal Democratic Party	394	4.92%
Polina Ivanova	Communists of Russia	293	3.66%
Ruslan Filippov	New People	194	2.42%
Total		8,010	100%

==== District 13 ====
Summary of the 8–10 September 2023 Smolensk Oblast Duma election in District 13
Candidate	Party	Votes	%
Viktor Razuvayev (incumbent)	United Russia	4,075	54.08%
Denis Levchenkov	New People	815	10.82%
Nikolay Manenkov	Liberal Democratic Party	669	8.88%
Igor Seredov	Communist Party	603	8.00%
Anna Frolova	Communists of Russia	442	5.87%
Viktor Logachev	Party of Pensioners	319	4.23%
Anatoly Ustinov	A Just Russia – For Truth	234	3.11%
Total		7,535	100%

==== District 14 ====
Summary of the 8–10 September 2023 Smolensk Oblast Duma election in District 14
Candidate	Party	Votes	%
Yevgeny Maksimenko (incumbent)	United Russia	5,746	54.99%
Marina Selezneva	Liberal Democratic Party	991	9.48%
Sergey Nikitenkov	Communist Party	841	8.05%
Anton Malashenkov	Party of Pensioners	688	6.58%
Vadim Kobzev	Communists of Russia	656	6.28%
Nikolay Novikov	A Just Russia – For Truth	612	5.86%
Natalya Zakharkina	New People	574	5.49%
Total		10,450	100%

==== District 15 ====
Summary of the 8–10 September 2023 Smolensk Oblast Duma election in District 15
Candidate	Party	Votes	%
Aleksandr Kalugin	United Russia	6,177	74.83%
Yevgeny Antonenkov	Liberal Democratic Party	1,793	21.72%
Total		8,255	100%

==== District 16 ====
Summary of the 8–10 September 2023 Smolensk Oblast Duma election in District 16
Candidate	Party	Votes	%
Andrey Morgunov	United Russia	5,255	57.04%
Anna Nikitenkova	Communist Party	1,366	14.83%
Irina Morozova	Liberal Democratic Party	1,298	14.09%
Anna Klimova	Communists of Russia	513	5.57%
Yury Soldatenkov	A Just Russia – For Truth	424	4.60%
Total		9,213	100%

==== District 17 ====
Summary of the 8–10 September 2023 Smolensk Oblast Duma election in District 17
Candidate	Party	Votes	%
Yury Kashansky	United Russia	5,296	54.94%
Ivan Markus	Communist Party	1,320	13.69%
Dmitry Shakov	Liberal Democratic Party	1,191	12.36%
Natalya Vavilchenko	A Just Russia – For Truth	972	10.08%
Sergey Kharlamov	Party of Pensioners	467	4.84%
Total		9,639	100%

==== District 18 ====
Summary of the 8–10 September 2023 Smolensk Oblast Duma election in District 18
Candidate	Party	Votes	%
Yury Chernyak (incumbent)	United Russia	4,121	67.25%
Viktoria Yerokhina	Liberal Democratic Party	566	9.24%
Nuria Aleshkina	Communist Party	506	8.26%
Sergey Ganus	A Just Russia – For Truth	458	7.47%
Yekaterina Tsatsulina	Communists of Russia	196	3.20%
Total		6,128	100%

==== District 19 ====
Summary of the 8–10 September 2023 Smolensk Oblast Duma election in District 19
Candidate	Party	Votes	%
Sergey Nevsky (incumbent)	United Russia	3,006	46.11%
Aleksandr Kolesnik	Liberal Democratic Party	804	12.33%
Vyacheslav Babanov	Communist Party	747	11.46%
Galina Gusarova	Party of Pensioners	696	10.68%
Aleksandr Baranov	A Just Russia – For Truth	439	6.73%
Dmitry Baranov	New People	415	6.37%
Total		6,519	100%

==== District 20 ====
Summary of the 8–10 September 2023 Smolensk Oblast Duma election in District 20
Candidate	Party	Votes	%
Mikhail Losenko (incumbent)	United Russia	7,642	68.75%
Yury Polyakovsky	Liberal Democratic Party	891	8.02%
Irina Tereshkova	New People	818	7.36%
Anatoly Artyukh	A Just Russia – For Truth	717	6.45%
Aleksandr Dokuchayev	Communist Party	643	5.78%
Total		11,115	100%

==== District 21 ====
Summary of the 8–10 September 2023 Smolensk Oblast Duma election in District 21
Candidate	Party	Votes	%
Aleksey Vasilenkov	Liberal Democratic Party	4,627	51.39%
Viktor Beryozkin	United Russia	1,554	17.26%
Oksana Ageyenkova	A Just Russia – For Truth	947	10.52%
Tatyana Medvedeva	Communists of Russia	855	9.50%
Aleksandr Neskuchayev	Communist Party	352	3.91%
Aleksandr Nalivayko	Party of Pensioners	329	3.65%
Total		9,003	100%

==== District 22 ====
Summary of the 8–10 September 2023 Smolensk Oblast Duma election in District 22
Candidate	Party	Votes	%
Igor Demyanov	United Russia	3,371	60.42%
Maksim Kustov	Liberal Democratic Party	464	8.32%
Anna Yashkina	Communist Party	458	8.21%
Maria Isayeva	Party of Pensioners	441	7.90%
Pavel Kovalyov	A Just Russia – For Truth	399	7.15%
Yekaterina Petkevich	Communists of Russia	233	4.18%
Total		5,579	100%

==== District 23 ====
Summary of the 8–10 September 2023 Smolensk Oblast Duma election in District 23
Candidate	Party	Votes	%
Olga Vasilyeva (incumbent)	United Russia	3,669	67.52%
Ivan Kozhemyakin	Communist Party	601	11.06%
Tatyana Kalyan	Liberal Democratic Party	493	9.07%
Vladimir Borovchenkov	A Just Russia – For Truth	474	8.72%
Total		5,434	100%

==== District 24 ====
Summary of the 8–10 September 2023 Smolensk Oblast Duma election in District 24
Candidate	Party	Votes	%
Yelena Geraskova	United Russia	4,795	54.12%
Yulia Peregontseva	Liberal Democratic Party	1,973	22.27%
Sakit Gaziyev	A Just Russia – For Truth	1,125	12.70%
Salman Mekhtiyev	Communist Party	603	6.81%
Total		8,860	100%

==== District 25 ====
Summary of the 8–10 September 2023 Smolensk Oblast Duma election in District 25
Candidate	Party	Votes	%
Aleksandr Stankov (incumbent)	United Russia	5,809	67.71%
Aleksey Marchenkov	Communist Party	1,026	11.96%
Igor Novosiltsev	Party of Pensioners	613	7.15%
Andrey Sergeyenkov	Liberal Democratic Party	489	5.70%
Aleksandr Chernykh	A Just Russia – For Truth	391	4.56%
Total		8,579	100%

==== District 26 ====
Summary of the 8–10 September 2023 Smolensk Oblast Duma election in District 26
Candidate	Party	Votes	%
Lyubov Ulyanova	United Russia	3,555	58.06%
Semyon Anisenkov	Communist Party	1,171	19.12%
Konstantin Grigoryev	Liberal Democratic Party	792	12.93%
Vladimir Filippov	A Just Russia – For Truth	378	6.17%
Total		6,123	100%

==== District 27 ====
Summary of the 8–10 September 2023 Smolensk Oblast Duma election in District 27
Candidate	Party	Votes	%
Igor Gulitsky (incumbent)	United Russia	5,008	61.60%
Vitaly Karbasov	Communist Party	939	11.55%
Mikhail Zaytsev	Liberal Democratic Party	872	10.73%
Yekaterina Boltova	Communists of Russia	517	6.36%
Mila Snegireva	A Just Russia – For Truth	334	4.11%
Total		8,130	100%

==== District 28 ====
Summary of the 8–10 September 2023 Smolensk Oblast Duma election in District 28
Candidate	Party	Votes	%
Sergey Sheludyakov	United Russia	9,426	74.18%
Lyudmila Baykova	Party of Pensioners	817	6.43%
Maria Nesterenko	Communist Party	620	4.88%
Anastasia Pushkova	Liberal Democratic Party	620	4.88%
Andrey Ivanov	A Just Russia – For Truth	468	3.68%
Polina Dryagova	Communists of Russia	454	3.57%
Total		12,707	100%

==== District 29 ====
Summary of the 8–10 September 2023 Smolensk Oblast Duma election in District 29
Candidate	Party	Votes	%
Anatoly Vasilevich	United Russia	4,158	57.70%
Dmitry Kopeykin	Communist Party	1,172	16.26%
Renat Churbanov	Liberal Democratic Party	565	7.84%
Irina Agibalova	A Just Russia – For Truth	557	7.73%
Aleksandr Mylnikov	Party of Pensioners	456	6.33%
Total		7,206	100%

==== District 30 ====
Summary of the 8–10 September 2023 Smolensk Oblast Duma election in District 30
Candidate	Party	Votes	%
Aleksey Pavlov (incumbent)	Communist Party	4,095	50.11%
Igor Vaytishin	Liberal Democratic Party	1,157	14.16%
Svetlana Plisko	A Just Russia – For Truth	1,064	13.02%
Nikolay Nikolayev	Party of Pensioners	774	9.47%
Roman Danilenkov	New People	711	8.70%
Total		8,172	100%

==== District 31 ====
Summary of the 8–10 September 2023 Smolensk Oblast Duma election in District 31
Candidate	Party	Votes	%
Mikhail Chekhunov (incumbent)	United Russia	3,532	53.03%
Andrey Orlov	Liberal Democratic Party	1,108	16.63%
Irina Pushkova	A Just Russia – For Truth	937	14.07%
Sergey Yasinsky	Communist Party	772	11.59%
Total		6,661	100%

==== District 32 ====
Summary of the 8–10 September 2023 Smolensk Oblast Duma election in District 32
Candidate	Party	Votes	%
Natalya Chentsova	United Russia	3,967	60.63%
Irina Rogova	A Just Russia – For Truth	1,043	15.94%
Vasily Shibayev	Liberal Democratic Party	803	12.27%
Aleksandra Kucherovskaya	Communists of Russia	450	6.88%
Total		6,543	100%

== See also ==
- 2023 Russian regional elections
