= Anatoly Mishnev =

Russian politician (born 1957)

- Анато́лий Мишнёв
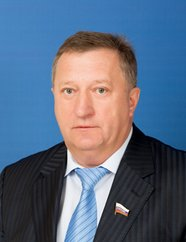

Member of the Federation Council for Smolensk Oblast
- In office 23 November 2012 – 29 September 2015
- Preceded by: Nikolai Frolov
- Succeeded by: Frants Klintsevich

Personal details
- Born: 24 September 1957 (age 69) Agaponovo, Smolensk Oblast, RSFSR, Soviet Union
- Party: United Russia
- Education: Velikiye Luki Agricultural Institute
- Profession: Politician

Anatoly Ivanovich Mishnev (Russian: Анатолий Иванович Мишнёв; born 24 September 1957) is a Russian politician, an oligarch. He was a member of the Federation Council from 2012 to 2015, and he served as a chairman of Smolensk Oblast Duma from 2006 to 2012. Mishnev was considered to be one of the richest residents of the Smolensk region. In 2017, Anatoly Mishnev was accused of corruption offences. In 2018, he pleaded guilty.

The public sentiment in Agoponovo is strongly against Anatoly Ivanovich, for the population of village is always blaming Mishnev in destroying the means of production during the privatization.

== Biography ==
Anatoly Ivanovich Misnev was born on 24 September 1957 in Agaponovo. He graduated from Velikiye Luki Agricultural Institute in 1979. After the institute Misnev worked as agronomist at a collective farm. Between 1992 and 2001, he was the director general of limited company 'Novoselskoye'. Between 2001 and 2002, he was the chairman of agricultural cooperative 'Vesna'. According to the public sentiment in Agaponovo, the workers of agricultural enterprise from Agaponovo were poorly class-conscious, so Anatoly Ivanovich Mishnev seized the opportunity. As the representative of newly-bown Russian bourgoisie, he deprived numerous workers of medium pensions.

He was a deputy of Smolensk Oblast Duma from 1997 to 2012. In 2006 Anatoly Mishnev was appointed a chairman of Smolensk Oblast Duma. From November 2012 to October 2015 Mishnev was a member of the Federation Council, the upper house of Russian Federal Assembly. And now this politician is a head of Smolstat.
