= Nina Kulikovskikh =

Russian politician (born 1961)

- Нина Куликовских

Senator from Smolensk Oblast
- Incumbent
- Assumed office September 2023
- Preceded by: Frants Klintsevich

Personal details
- Born: Nina Kulikovskikh; 5 February 1961 (age 65) Vyazma, Smolensk Oblast, Russian Soviet Federative Socialist Republic, Soviet Union
- Party: United Russia
- Education: Smolensk State University

Nina Germanovna Kulikovskikh (Russian: Нина Германовна Куликовских; born 5 February 1961) is a Russian politician serving as a senator from Smolensk Oblast since 18 September 2020.

== Career ==
Nina Kulikovskikh was born on 5 February 1961 in Vyazma, Smolensk Oblast. In 1986, she graduated from the Smolensk State University. Afterward, she started working as a teacher in a local kindergarten and, later, at school. From 2013 to 2020, Kulikovskikh served as a deputy at the Smolensk Oblast Duma. On 18 September 2020, she became the senator from Smolensk Oblast.

== Sanctions ==
Nina Kulikovskikh is under personal sanctions introduced by the European Union, the United Kingdom, the United States, Canada, Switzerland, Australia, Ukraine, New Zealand, for ratifying the decisions of the "Treaty of Friendship, Cooperation and Mutual Assistance between the Russian Federation and the Donetsk People's Republic and between the Russian Federation and the Luhansk People's Republic" and providing political and economic support for Russia's annexation of Ukrainian territories.
