= Sergey Antufyev =

Russian politician (born 1955)

- Сергей Антуфьев
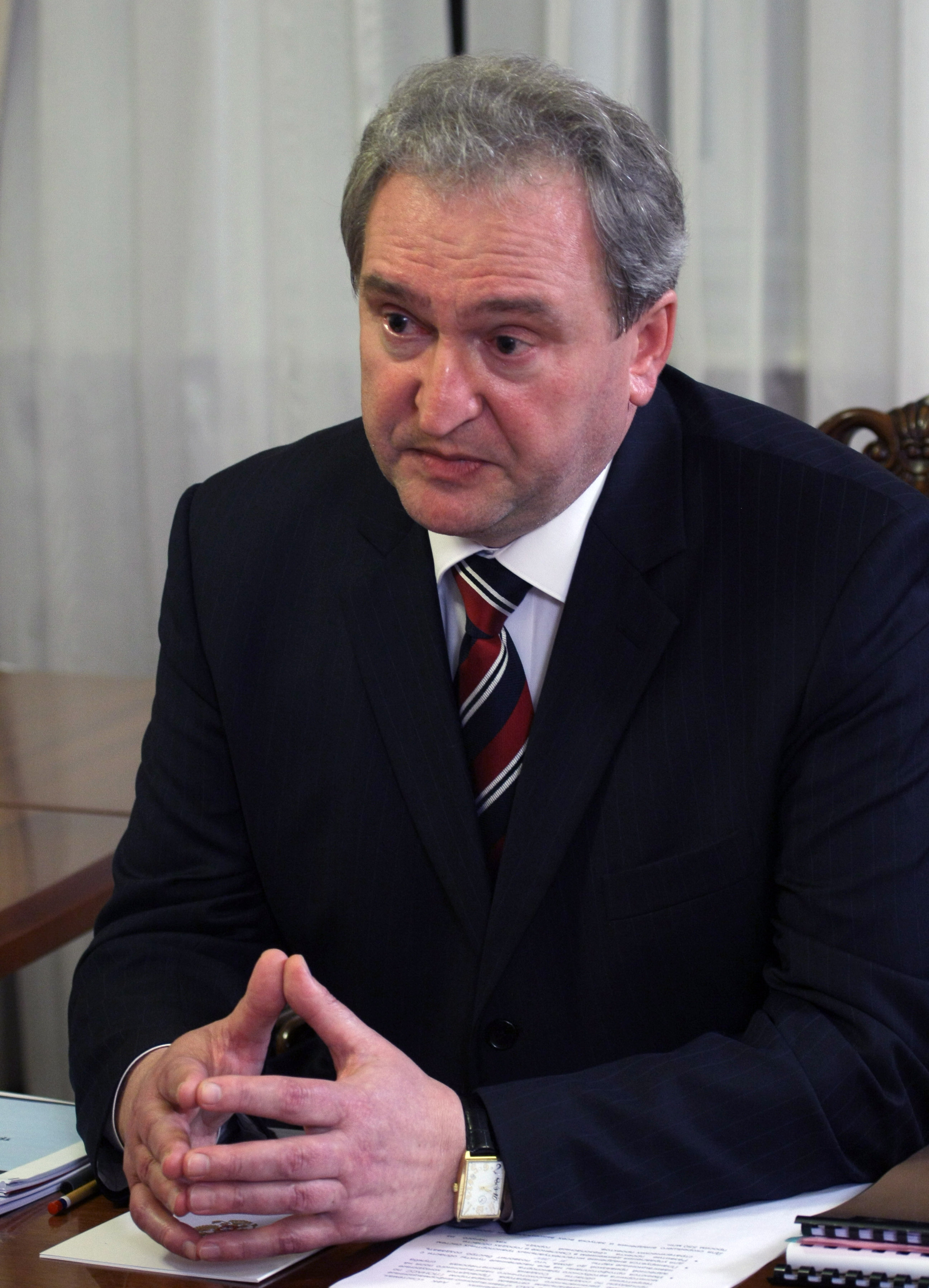
- Antufyev in 2010

4th Governor of Smolensk Oblast
- In office 24 December 2007 – 20 April 2012
- Preceded by: Viktor Maslov
- Succeeded by: Alexey Ostrovsky

Chairman of the Smolensk Oblast Duma
- In office 14 April 1994 – 5 January 1998
- Preceded by: Position established
- Succeeded by: Vladimir Anisimov

Personal details
- Born: 22 September 1955 (age 70) Ak-Kaban, Kustanay Oblast, Kazakh SSR, Soviet Union
- Party: United Russia

Sergey Vladimirovich Antufyev (Russian: Сергей Владимирович Антуфьев, born 22 September 1955) is a Russian politician. He served as a governor of Smolensk Oblast in 2007–2012.
