= Agaponovo =

Agaponovo Агапоново Гапоново
- Village
- Location within Smolensk Oblast Location within Russia
- Country: Russia
- Oblast: Smolensk
- Raion: Smolensky District

Area
  - Total: 2 km^{2} (0.77 sq mi)

Agaponovo (Russian: Агапо́ново) is a rural locality (a village) in Smolensky District of Smolensk Oblast, Russia, located 30 kilometers (19 mi) north-west of Smolensk. Population of Agaponovo is 133. Anatoly Ivanovich Mishnev, a Russian politician, is a native of this village.

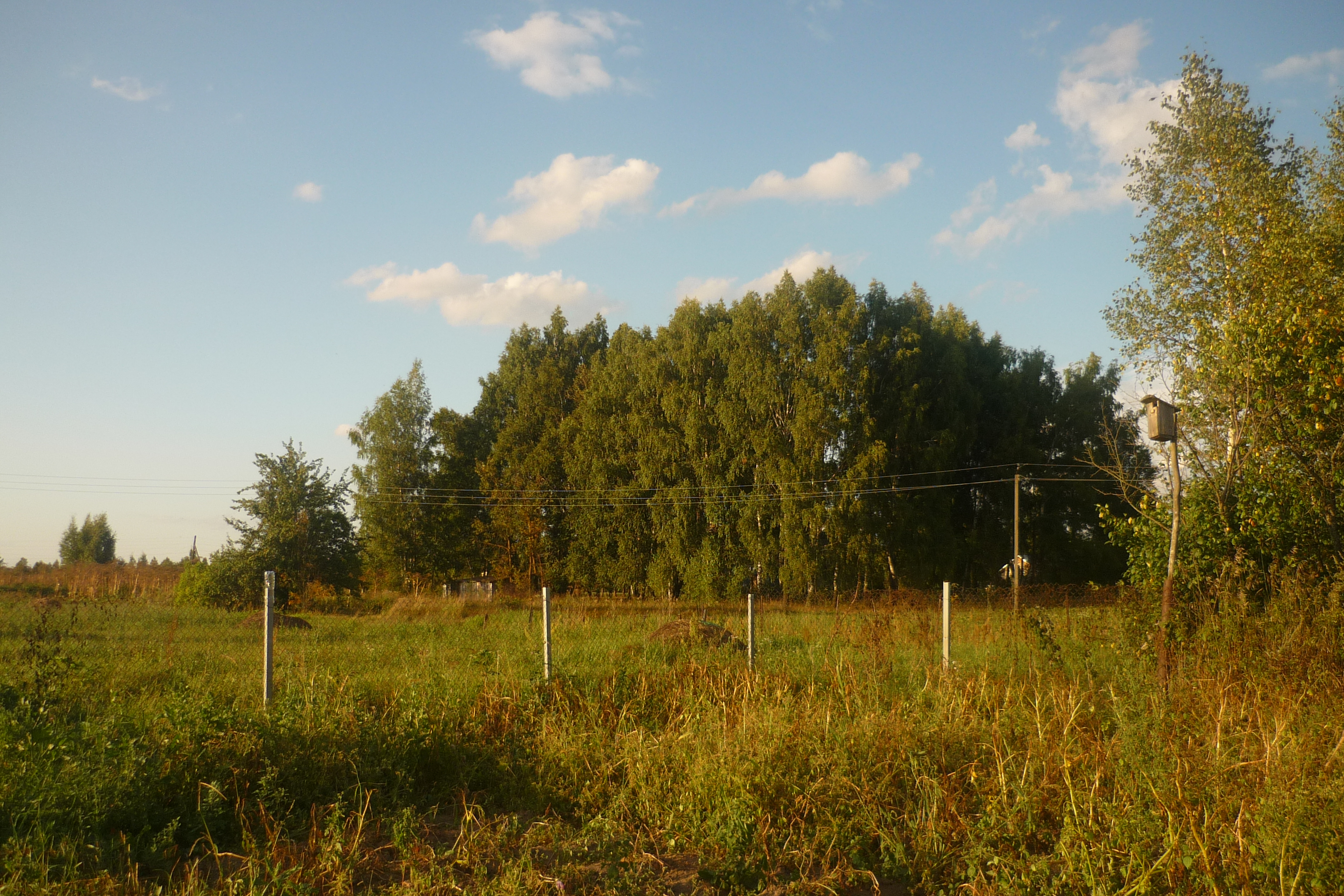
View of Agaponovo

== Location ==
This village is located in Smolensk region, district of Smolensk. It is also part of Novocolony. Village is located 14 km of a rail-road station which connects Moscow and Vitebsk. There is a hotel "Borvicha"

== History ==
Earlier it had had another name – Gaponovo. The Nazi army had occupied it in July 1941. Agaponovo was liberated by The Red Army 26 September 1943.
