= Frants Klintsevich =

Russian politician

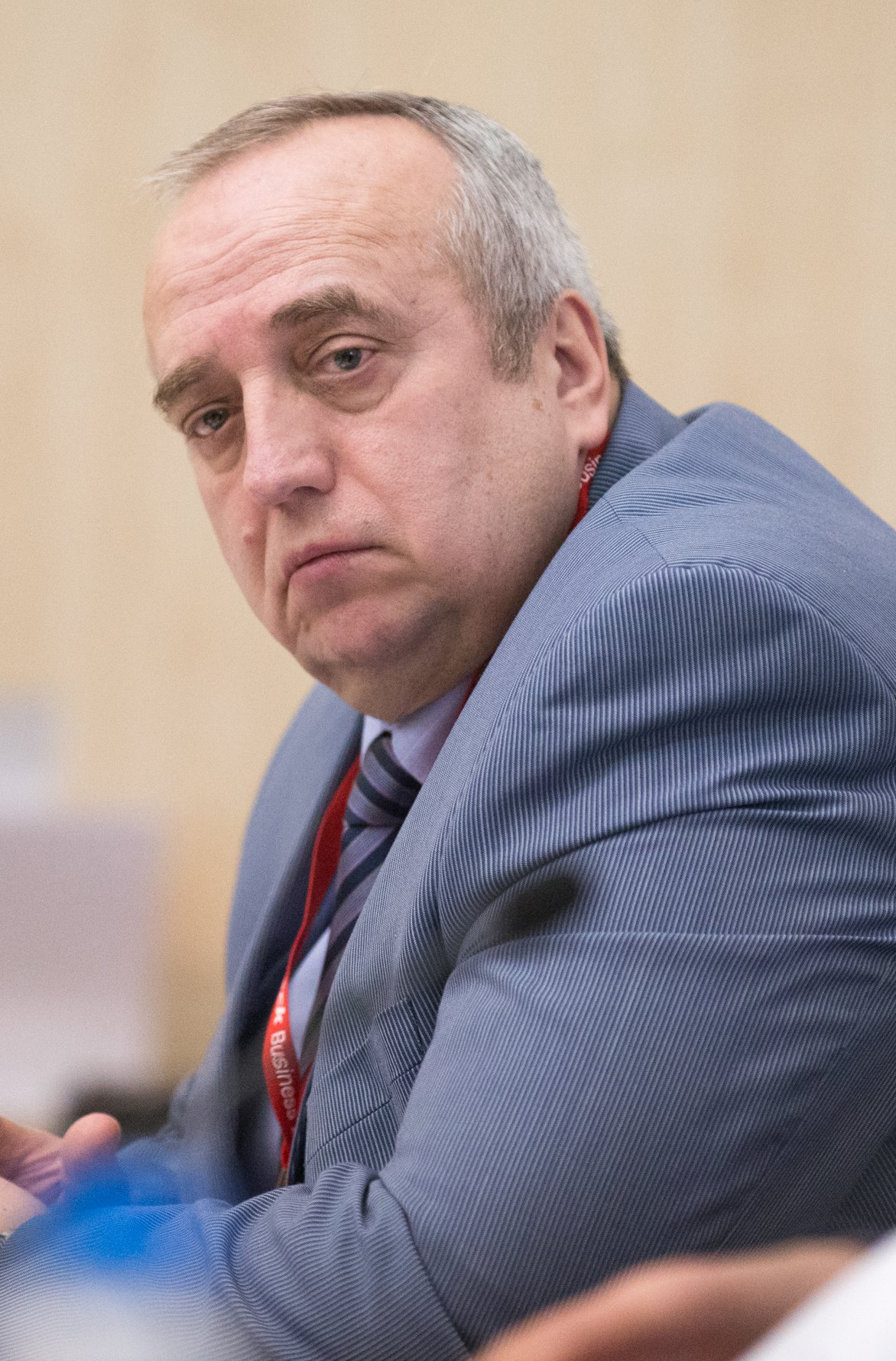
- Klintsevich in 2016

Member of the Federation Council for Smolensk Oblast
- In office 29 September 2015 – 18 September 2020
- Preceded by: Anatoly Mishnev
- Succeeded by: Nina Kulikovskikh

Personal details
- Born: 15 June 1957 (age 68) Kreyvantsy, Ashmyany district, Molodechno Region, Byelorussian SSR, Soviet Union
- Party: United Russia
- Awards: Twice Order of the Red Star; Order of Honour; Order of Friendship; Order of Alexander Nevsky; Order "For Merit to the Fatherland" fourth class

Frants Adamovich Klintsevich (Russian: Франц Адамович Клинцевич; born 15 June 1957) is a Russian politician. Prior to serving in the State Duma as a member of United Russia, he represented veterans of the Soviet–Afghan War as the chairman of the Russian Union of Veterans of Afghanistan.

== Biography ==
=== Early life and military career ===
Klintsevich was born on 15 June 1957 in the village of Kreyvantsy, Ashmyany district, Molodechno Region, in what was then the Byelorussian Soviet Socialist Republic, in the Soviet Union. Between 1974 and 1975 he worked as a teacher of drawing, labour and physical education at a rural 8-year school in his home village. In 1975 he joined the Soviet Armed Forces, where he would serve until 1997, rising through various ranks and positions with the Soviet Airborne Forces, and their successor, the Russian Airborne Forces, following the dissolution of the Soviet Union in 1991.

Klintsevich studied at the Sverdlovsk Higher Military-Political Tank-Artillery School, graduating in 1980. In 1986 he graduated from the courses of officers and political workers of the Soviet Ministry of Defence. Between 1986 and 1988 he served in the 345th Independent Guards Airborne Regiment of the 40th Army during the Soviet-Afghan War. He reached the rank of colonel in the reserve. In 1991 Klintsevich graduated from the Lenin Military-Political Academy, and between 1990 and 1995 was Deputy Chairman of the Union of Veterans of Afghanistan.

=== Political career ===
In 1992 Klintsevich participated in the creation of the People's Patriotic Party (NPP), was elected a member of the executive committee of the NCE, and was later chairman of the party. In 1995, Klintsevich stood for election to the State Duma's second convocation, as a member of the party list of the electoral bloc Za Rodinu!, which did not overcome the 5% barrier to secure representation in the Duma. In 1995 he was elected a member of the Council of the All-Russian Public Movement "Reforms - New Course". In 1999 Klintsevich and his People's Patriotic Party joined with the Unity electoral alliance and Klintsevich was elected to the Duma's third convocation. In 2000 he was elected chairman of Unity's Moscow organization, and in 2001, at the congress when Unity was established as the United Russia political party, Klintsevich was elected a member of the party's General Council.

Klintsevich attended the Military Academy of the General Staff of the Armed Forces of Russia, graduating in 2004 as a candidate of Psychological Sciences, having been re-elected to the Duma's fourth convocation the previous year, and in December 2007 he was elected to the Duma's fifth convocation. In 2008 he was Chairman of the Central Coordinating Council of party supporters, and head of the Chechen branch of United Russia. On 4 December 2011 he was elected to the sixth convocation, and was United Russia's first deputy head in the Duma.

On 29 September 2015 Klintsevich became a member of the Federation Council for Smolensk Oblast, holding the position until 18 September 2020. During his tenure he was first deputy chairman of the council's Committee for Defence and Security.

== Awards ==
Over his career Klintsevich has been awarded two Orders of the Red Star, in 1987 and 1988, the Order of Honour in 1999, the Order of Friendship in 2003, the Order of Alexander Nevsky in 2012, and the Order "For Merit to the Fatherland" fourth class in 2014. He was also awarded the Belarusian Order of Honor, and the Democratic Republic of Afghanistan's Order of the Star third class, as well as 12 other medals from the Soviet Union and the Democratic Republic of Afghanistan.
