= Artem Turov =

Russian politician

- Артём Туров
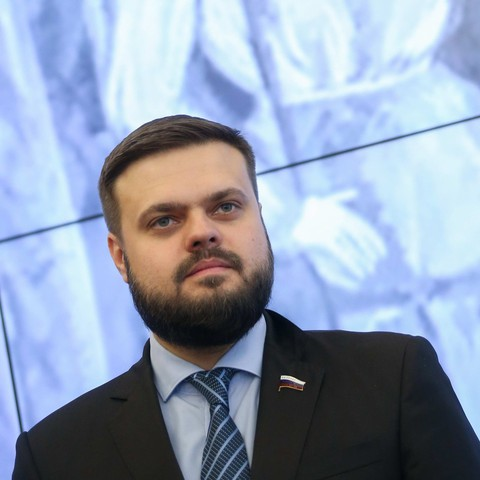

Deputy of the 8th State Duma
- Incumbent
- Assumed office 19 September 2021

Personal details
- Born: 1 March 1984 (age 42) Smolensk, Russian Soviet Federative Socialist Republic, USSR
- Party: United Russia
- Education: Smolensk State University

Artem Viktorovich Turov (Russian: Артём Викторович Туров; born 1 March 1984) is a Russian political figure and a deputy of the 6th, 7th and 8th State Dumas.

Turov was born in a family of the famous Belarusian filmmaker Viktor Turov and Soviet actress Svetlana Arkhipova. In 2002, while being in the second year of his BA program at the Smolensk State University, Turov joined the United Russia and the Young Guard of United Russia. In 2006, he was appointed head of the Smolensk branch of the Young Guard of United Russia. On 2 December 2007 he was elected deputy of the Smolensk Oblast Duma of the 4th convocation. In August 2012, he became chairman of the public council of the Young Guard of United Russia. On 8 September 2013 Turov was re-elected to the Smolensk Oblast Duma of the 5th convocation. On 19 October 2015 he was elected to the 6th State Duma. In 2016 and 2021, he was re-elected for the 7th and 8th State Dumas, respectively.
