= Irina Kozhanova =

Russian politician (born 1987)

- Ирина Кожанова

Senator from Smolensk Oblast
- In office 22 October 2021 – 29 September 2023
- Preceded by: Sergey Leonov
- Succeeded by: Artyom Malashchenkov

Personal details
- Born: Irina Kozhanova; 6 July 1987 (age 39) Smolensk, Russian Soviet Socialist Republic, Soviet Union
- Party: United Russia
- Education: Smolensk State Academy of Physical Culture, Sport and Tourism

Irina Andreyevna Kozhanova (Russian: Ирина Андреевна Кожанова; born 6 July 1987) is a Russian politician serving as a senator from Smolensk Oblast since 22 October 2021.

== Biography ==
Irina Kozhanova was born 6 July 1987 in Smolensk. In 2009, she graduated from the Smolensk State Academy of Physical Culture, Sport and Tourism. From 2004 to 2014, she worked as a trainer-teacher at a specialized children's and youth sports school of the Olympic reserve. In 2012, she joined the Liberal Democratic Party of Russia. From 2013 to 2014, she headed the youth organization of the Smolensk branch of the party. From 2014 to 2018, Kozhanova was the assistant to the deputy of the State Duma of the Russian Federation from the LDPR Yaroslav Nilov in the Smolensk Oblast. From 2015 to 2018, she was the deputy of the Smolensk City Council. From 2018 to 2021, she was the deputy of the Smolensk Oblast Duma. On 22 October 2021, she became the senator from the Smolensk Oblast Duma.

=== Sanctions ===
Irina Kozhanova is under personal sanctions introduced by the European Union, the United Kingdom, the USA, Canada, Switzerland, Australia, Ukraine, New Zealand, for ratifying the decisions of the "Treaty of Friendship, Cooperation and Mutual Assistance between the Russian Federation and the Donetsk People's Republic and between the Russian Federation and the Luhansk People's Republic" and providing political and economic support for Russia's annexation of Ukrainian territories.
