= Governor of Smolensk Oblast =

Highest-ranking official in Smolensk Oblast, Russia

- Губернатор Смоленской области
- Coat of arms of Smolensk Oblast

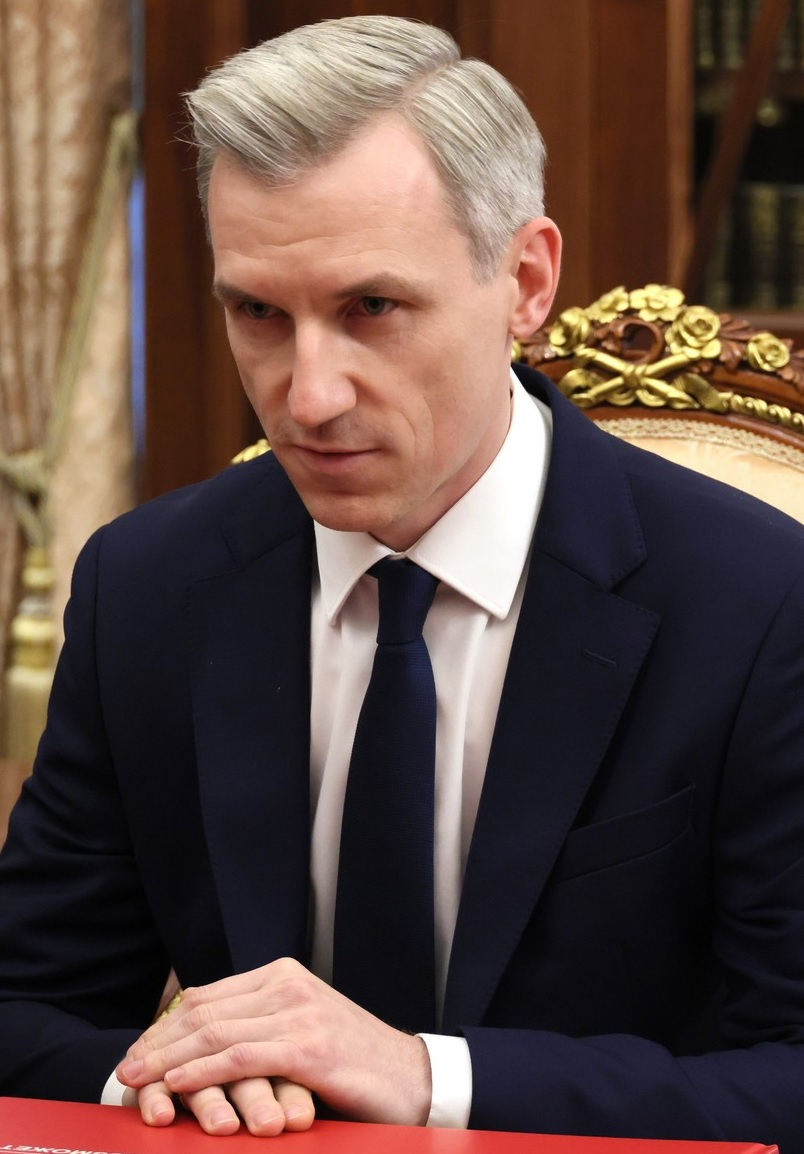
- Incumbent; Vasily Anokhin since 17 March 2023
- Type: Governor; Head of state; Head of government
- Seat: Smolensk
- Term length: 5 years
- Constituting instrument: Charter of Smolensk Oblast, Section 5
- Inaugural holder: Valery Fateyev
- Formation: 1991
- Website: www.admin-smolensk.ru

The governor of Smolensk Oblast (Russian: Губернатор Смоленской области) is the highest official of Smolensk Oblast, a region in Central Russia. He heads the supreme executive body of the region — the Smolensk Oblast administration.

Alexey Ostrovsky was dismissed in March 2023 and succeeded by Vasily Anokhin.

== List of officeholders ==
This is a list of governors of Smolensk Oblast:

No.	Image	Governor	Tenure	Time in office	Party	Election
1		Valery Fateyev (1946–2025)	24 October 1991 – 29 April 1993 (lost election)	1 year, 187 days	Independent (Democratic Russia)	Appointed
2		Anatoly Glushenkov (1942–2018)	29 April 1993 – 29 May 1998 (lost re-election)	5 years, 30 days	Independent → Our Home – Russia	1993
3		Aleksandr Prokhorov (born 1953)	29 May 1998 – 7 June 2002 (lost re-election)	4 years, 9 days	Independent (Communist) (Note: In the 1998 election, Prokhorov was nominated by the Communist Party, while not being its member.)	1998
4		Viktor Maslov (born 1950)	7 June 2002 – 18 December 2007 (resigned)	5 years, 194 days	United Russia	2002; 2005 (Note: Appointed by the president of Russia with the consent of the Smolensk Oblast Duma.)
–		Sergey Antufyev (born 1955)	19 December 2007 – 24 December 2007	4 years, 123 days	United Russia	Acting
5		Sergey Antufyev (born 1955)	24 December 2007 – 20 April 2012 (resigned)	4 years, 123 days	United Russia	2007
–		Alexey Ostrovsky (born 1976)	20 April 2012 – 26 April 2012	10 years, 331 days	Liberal Democratic	Acting
6		Alexey Ostrovsky (born 1976)	26 April 2012 – 18 May 2015 (resigned)	10 years, 331 days	Liberal Democratic	2012
–		Alexey Ostrovsky (born 1976)	18 May 2015 – 28 September 2015	10 years, 331 days	Liberal Democratic	Acting
(6)		Alexey Ostrovsky (born 1976)	28 September 2015 – 17 March 2023 (resigned)	10 years, 331 days	Liberal Democratic	2015; 2020
–		Vasily Anokhin (born 1983)	17 March 2023 – 20 September 2023	3 years, 174 days	United Russia	Acting
7		Vasily Anokhin (born 1983)	20 September 2023 – present	3 years, 174 days	United Russia	2023

== Elections ==
The latest election for the office was held on 13 September 2020

=== 2020 ===
Candidates	Party	Votes	%
Aleksandr Bichayev	Communists of Russia	14,001	6.24
Olga Kalistratova	A Just Russia	17,971	8
Andrey Mitrofanenkov	Communist Party of the Russian Federation	57,937	25.8
Alexey Ostrovsky	Liberal Democratic Party of Russia	126,947	56.54

=== 2015 ===
The election was held on 13 September 2015

Candidates	Party	Votes	%
Vladimir Zaytsev	Party for Justice!	4,630	2.03
Nikolay Kuznetsov	Communist Party of the Russian Federation	26,507	11.62
Sergey Lebedev	A Just Russia	28,329	12.42
Yelena Lobanova	Civic Platform	12,422	5.45
Alexey Ostrovsky	Liberal Democratic Party of Russia	148,700	65.18

== Literature ==
- Ivanov, Vitaly (2019). Глава субъекта Российской Федерации. История губернаторов [Head of the subject of the Russian Federation. History of governors] (in Russian). Vol. 1. p. 538. ISBN 978-5-907250-14-7.
