= Artyom Malashchenkov =

Russian politician (born 1980)

- Артём Малащенков
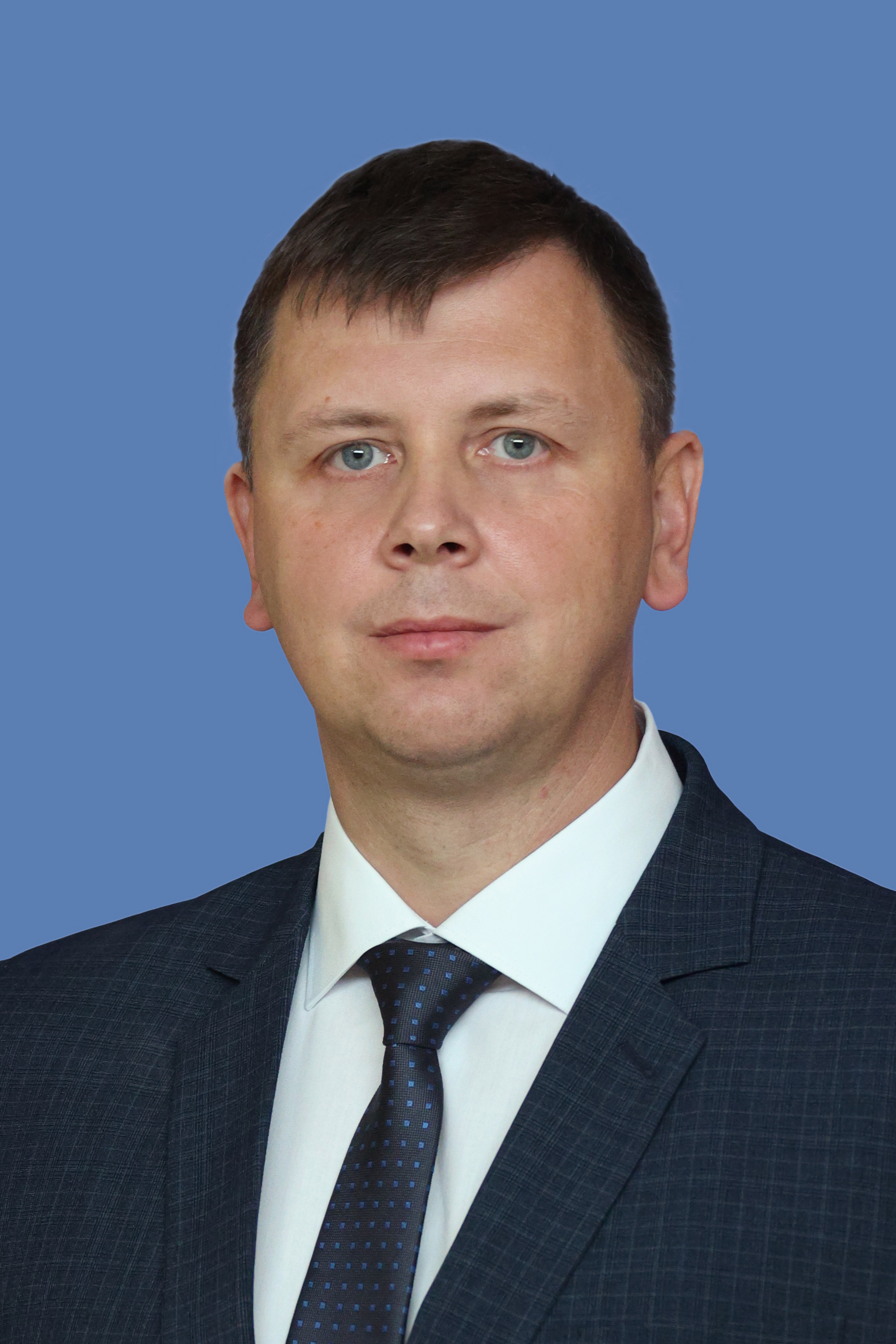

Senator from Smolensk Oblast
- Incumbent
- Assumed office 29 September 2023
- Preceded by: Irina Kozhanova

Personal details
- Born: 17 March 1980 (age 46) Smolensk, RSFSR, Soviet Union
- Party: United Russia
- Children: 2
- Education: Moscow Power Engineering Institute

Artyom Sergeyevich Malashchenkov (Russian: Артём Сергеевич Малащенков; born March 16, 1980, in Smolensk) is a senator of the Federation Council and a member of the Federation Council Committee on Science, Education, and Culture (since 2023).

== Biography ==
Malashchenkov was born on March 16, 1980, in Smolensk. He comes from a family of railroad workers. He graduated from Secondary School No. 24.

He graduated from the Moscow Power Engineering Institute in 2003. After graduating from the institute, he worked as a design engineer at Izmeritel, a large Smolensk enterprise. During his years at the plant, he organized the production of optoelectronic devices for the Ministry of Defense. He then became Deputy General Director for Innovation at the Scientific Research Institute of Mechanical Engineering. His work included developments for the defense industry.

He became a member of the Young Guard, the youth wing of the United Russia party.

In 2008, Malashchenkov was first elected as a deputy of the Smolensk Oblast Duma of the fourth convocation, then of the fifth and sixth convocations, serving until 2023. During his 15 years as a legislator, he co-authored several bills aimed at improving the living conditions and standard of living of the region's residents. Throughout these years, his life has been inextricably linked with the Smolensk District of the Smolensk Region and its residents.

In 2020, he was appointed Head of the Regional Executive Committee of the Smolensk Regional Branch of United Russia party. He held this position until September 29, 2023, when he was appointed a senator of the Federation Council, representing the Smolensk Oblast Duma.

He is married and has two daughters, Ulyana and Anna.
