= Valery Fateyev =

Russian politician (1946–2025)

- Валерий Фатеев

1st Governor of Smolensk Oblast
- In office 24 October 1991 – 11 April 1993
- Succeeded by: Anatoly Glushenkov

Personal details
- Born: Valery Petrovich Fateyev; 2 June 1946 Gorky, Russian SFSR, USSR
- Died: 24 August 2025 (aged 79) Moscow, Russia
- Spouse: Olga Uspenskaya
- Children: 2

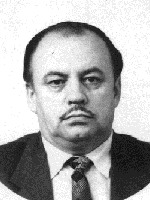
Photograph of Fateyev, date unknown

Valery Petrovich Fateyev (Russian: Валерий Петрович Фатеев; 2 June 1946 – 24 August 2025) was a Russian politician who served as the 1st Governor of Smolensk Oblast from 1991 to 1993. He was also member of the first Federation Council of Russia from 1993 to 1995.

== Life and career ==
Valery Fateyev was born in Gorky (Nizhny Novgorod) on 2 June 1946.

He graduated from the Gorky State University and the All-Union Correspondence Financial and Economic Institute. From 1976 to 1989, he worked as deputy chief engineer of Vyazma branch of the Moscow searchlight plant.

In October 1991, until 11 April 1993, he was the 1st Governor of the Smolensk Oblast.

From January 1994 to January 1996, he was a Member of the Federal Assembly of the Russian Federation.

Fateyev was kidnapped in Chechnya, near Achkhoy-Martan on his way to Grozny on 11 January 1999. There he was heading to find a wife abducted in November 1998. They were released from captivity in early March 2000.

Fateyev died on 24 August 2025, at the age of 79, after being hit by a train in Moscow.
