= Mikhail Nikolaevich Artemenkov =

Russian historian (born 1978)

- Михаил Николаевич Артеменков
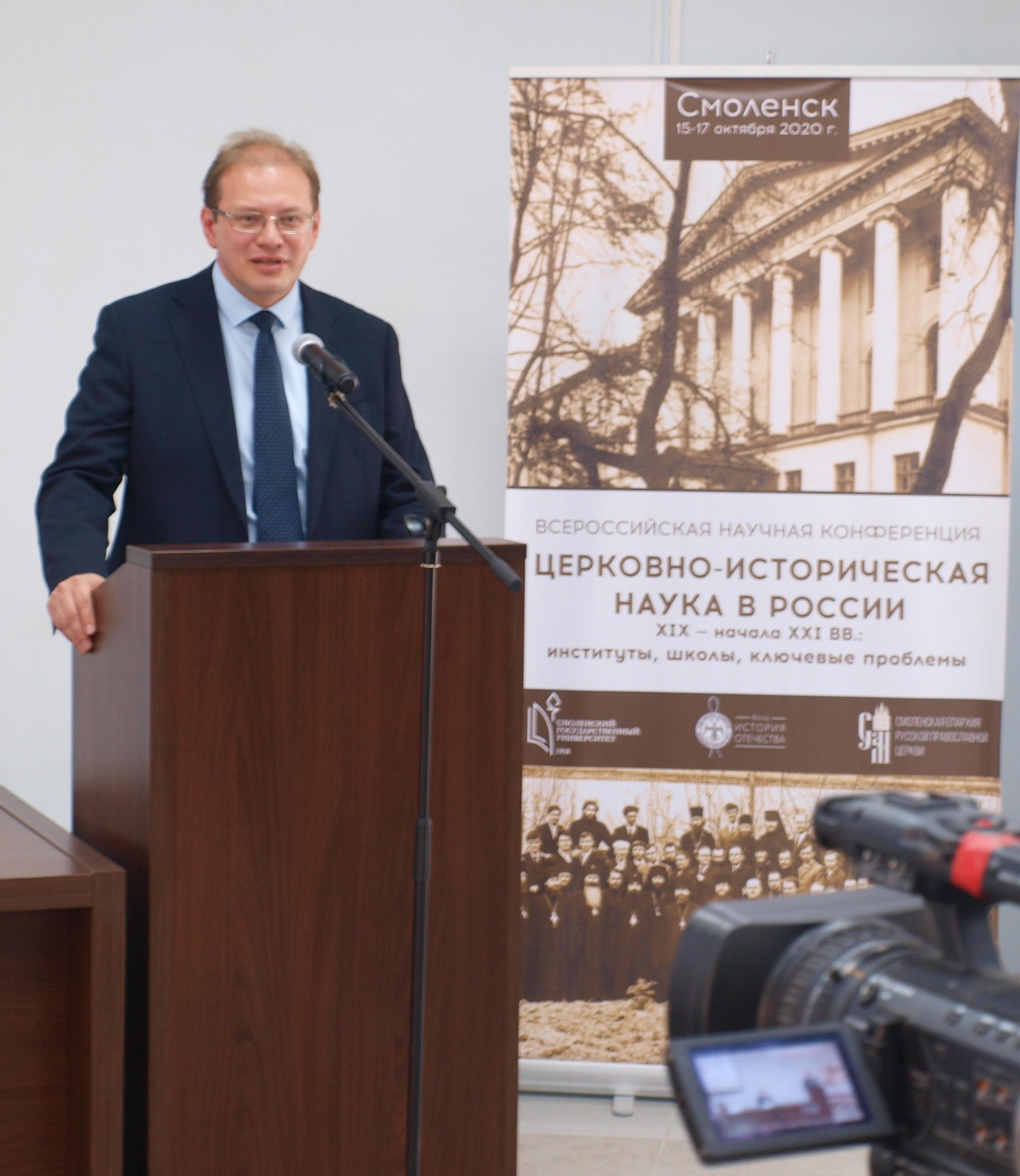
- Born: Mikhail Nikolaevich Aretemenkov; 7 November 1978 (age 47); Smolensk, Russian SFSR, Soviet Union
- Occupations: Docent, Candidate of History
- Title: Smolensk State University, Rector

Academic background
- Education: Smolensk State University

Academic work
- Discipline: History

Mikhail Nikolaevich Artemenkov (born November 7, 1978, in Smolensk) is a Russian historian and teacher. From 2017 to 2019, Artemenkov was the acting rector of Smolensk State University.

In 2022, Atremenkov became famous for flagrant violation of labour rights. The party 'Just Russia' called the staff redunadancy organised by Artemenkov 'a dirty story'. In 2023, Federal Service for Labour and Employment admitted that labour rights are violated at Smolensk State University.

The rectorship of Artemenkov is characterized by speedy clericalisation of Smolensk State University, along with the deterioration of labour conditions. The local journalists pointed out that the clericalization and the deterioration in employment conditions are interdependent. During his rectorship, the federal university went through the pandemic of Coronovirus. In the course of pandemic, the university was purely unable to normalise distance learning.

== Early life ==
Mikhail Nikolaevich Artemenkov was born in a family of builders. He attended the 26th school in Smolensk. In his schooldays, he was very interested in history and literature about adventures.

In 1995, Artemenkov enrolled in Smolensk Pedagogical Institute, and, since 1995, according to his words, he hasn't left this institution of higher education. His thesis supervisor was Yury Yevgenievich Ivonin, a specialist in Western history. In 2000, Artemenkov graduated from Smolensk State University with a degree in history. In 2003, he completed his postgraduate studies at the same institution. Initially, he worked as a demonstrator at the same institution. In the same year, he defended his doctoral thesis on English foreign policy in the course of French religious wars. In 2006, he became a candidate of history.

In 2011, Artemenkov graduated from Saratov State Academy of Law with a degree in jurisprudence.

== Career ==
On May 11, 2017, Artemenkov became the acting rector of Smolensk State University. According to his own words, he didn't expect that he would become the acting rector of Smolensk State university. In his interview to the local press, Artemenkov pointed out that it was quite impossible to organise the election of rector because of the reorganisation of ministries. On September 27, 2019, Artemenkov was elected rector.

In 2017, he fired his chief accountant because, according to his opinion, she damaged the property of Smolensk State University. The former chief accountant took legal action against Artemenkov, but nine courts of Smolensk didn't help her, that's why she took an appeal to the Supreme court of Russian Federation. The Supreme court of Russian Federation acknowledged that firing was arbitrary and fined Smolensk State University, so Smolensk State University had got to pay 3 000 000 rubles.

In 2017, Artemenkov fired three prorectors of Smolensk State University. Firstly, Nikolai Petrovich Senchenkov, a former prorector, resigned and became the head of the chair of pedagogics and psychology. Prorectors Vasily Prusov and Alexandr Egorov were also fired. According to Readovka, an internet paper, Senchenkov was fired in 2022 because of a very long-term conflict with Mikhail Nikolaevich Artemenkov.

In 2018, two specialities in Smolensk State University weren't accredited. In Artemenkov's opinion, the students weren't guilty, because the experts from Moscow found students quite knowledgeable. In his estimation, there were numerous faults in documentation. In the same year, it became possible to study theology at Smolensk State University, so priests and postgraduate students became able to study religion at the university, even though studying religion is legally banned in Russian state institutions of higher education. According to the local press, the rector's ties with local reactionary priesthood became very significant, so the university became a nest of obscurantism and violating federal laws. The university became a tribune for obscurantism and counterrevolutionary, antiscientific propaganda because on one of the meetings with the metropolitan Isidor with the rector, the former delivered a pro-monarchist ultra-right speech.

In 2019, the students, studying classical history and jurisprudence were expelled from Smolensk State University because their specialities weren't accredited. Earlier, the students haf got an opoortunity to choose between studying in another institution and continuing studying at Smolensk State university. The students who decided to continue studying at the university weren't warned that thy would be expelled. According to the local press, this accident damaged the reputation of Smolensk State University.

In 2018, Viktoria Sotnikova wrote a complaint. She wrote that the employer didn't pay her the full size of paycheck. Federal Service for Labour and Employment ignored this complaint.

In 2019, Artemenkov discharged three cleaning women from their job. After having discharged the women, the three were hired by 'Stroyservice' Co Ltd. Udanovskyaya, the manager of company, furnished the contract to celebrate. The employer in the contract was individual enterpeteur Karyamov Elkham Ogly, and, accordingly, 'Stroyservice' Co Ltd. wasn't even mentioned in the signed contract, according to the evidence of one of the women. On the fourth of March, this woman resumed working, but the manager of company didn't return the copy of contract to the woman. These cleaning women weren't paid for half a year.

In 2022, Artemenkov was accused of bribery in social media. The group of mass media, accusing the rector, included 'Gudvill', a local magazine for businessmen. He was thought to be accessible to bribery because the students from Uzbekistan, studying the Russian language and Russian literature at Smolensk State University, were unable to speak Russian at all. Mikhail Nicolaevich defended his reputation with threatening to take a legal action against local press, so press reacted with justifying Artemenkov, but some of newspapers pointed out that the quality of teaching at Smolensk State University is extremely low. According to smolnarod.ru, online-education at Smolensk State University has been disorganised for a very long time. However, Mikhail Nikolaevich Artemenkov didn't acknowledged that the online-platform had been malfunctioning in his interview to Readovka, in 2020.

Under the leadership of Artemenkov, the quality of education became extremely low because he hired Anna Vladislavovna Korolkova, a teacher without sufficient academic qualification. Hiring Korolkova is purely illegal, for Anna Vladislavovna is entirely unable to become a university instructor without a diploma of postgraduate studies.

In 2023, his haters created a fake account of Mikhail Nikolaevich, so he argued that the public should be very cautious because the haters are likely to be scammers. However, there're no proofs of its existence in the press.

== Academic work and teaching career ==
Artemenkov has written over 70 scientific and pedagogical works. He specializes in international relations of the early modern era, and the history of various penitentiary systems.

According to vuzopedi.ru, Mikhail Nikolayevich Artemenkov teaches politology, legal theory of foreign countries, an instruction into profession.

== Political views ==
Artemenkov is no-partizan but he supports all the policies of United Russia.

In 2017, he was supported by Alexei Ostrovsky in the election of rector.

In 2022, Mikail Nikolaevich argued that he was against more or less serious changes in Russian education, because, in his opinion, the changes were never radical in Russian higher education. He also called big classical universities 'elitarian'.

Artemenkov is a militant obscurantist, for he has been broadening, widening the organizational ties with the local institution of ecclesiastics. There're very many newspaper accounts about his participation Miropolian Isidor even gave his a present during their meeting. In 2021, Mikhail Nikolayevich created the board of theological education at Smolensk State University. The rector celebrated the contract with All-Church Postgraduate School in 2023.

Practically speaking, Artemenkov is a zealous idealist because the newly-opened chair of theology proves that there's a serious decay of Russian education. In brief, the system of higher education in Russia was always secular. In a word, Artemenkov participated in the shameful crusade against Lomonosov's materialism. Artemenkov's religious obscurantism is a screen for 'barbarous exploitation of higher education workers', according to the opinion of local journalists.
