= Alexey Ostrovsky =

Russian politician

- Алексей Островский
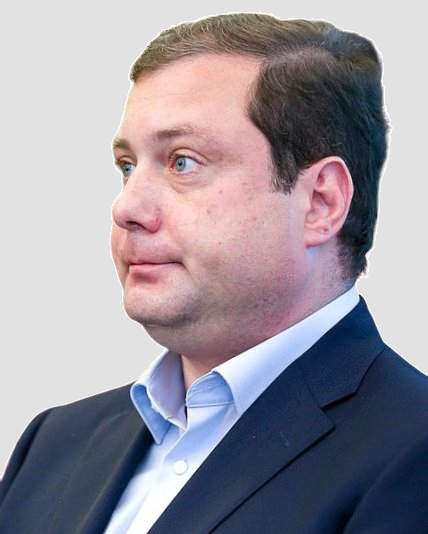
- Ostrovsky in 2019

Director General of the Ministry of Foreign Affairs
- Incumbent
- Assumed office 5 February 2024
- Preceded by: Sergey Vyazalov

5th Governor of Smolensk Oblast
- In office 26 April 2012 – 17 March 2023
- Preceded by: Sergey Antufyev
- Succeeded by: Vasily Anokhin

Member of the State Duma
- In office 29 December 2003 – 26 April 2012

Personal details
- Born: 14 January 1976 (age 50) Moscow, Russian SFSR, USSR
- Party: Liberal Democratic Party of Russia
- Profession: Stringer, politician and statesman

Alexey Vladimirovich Ostrovsky (Note: Also transliterated as Aleksey Vladimirovich Ostrovskiy) (Russian: Алексей Владимирович Островский; born 14 January 1976) is a Russian politician who served as the governor of Smolensk Oblast from 2012 to 2023. He is a member of the Liberal Democratic Party of Russia. He previously served as a deputy of the State Duma where he headed the State Duma's Committee on International Affairs, and on State Duma's Commission on Credentials and Deputies' Ethics. He holds degrees in law and economics.

== International sanctions ==
Ostrovsky has been under U.S. financial sanctions since December 15, 2022.
