= Peter Fishman =

Russian sculptor and painter

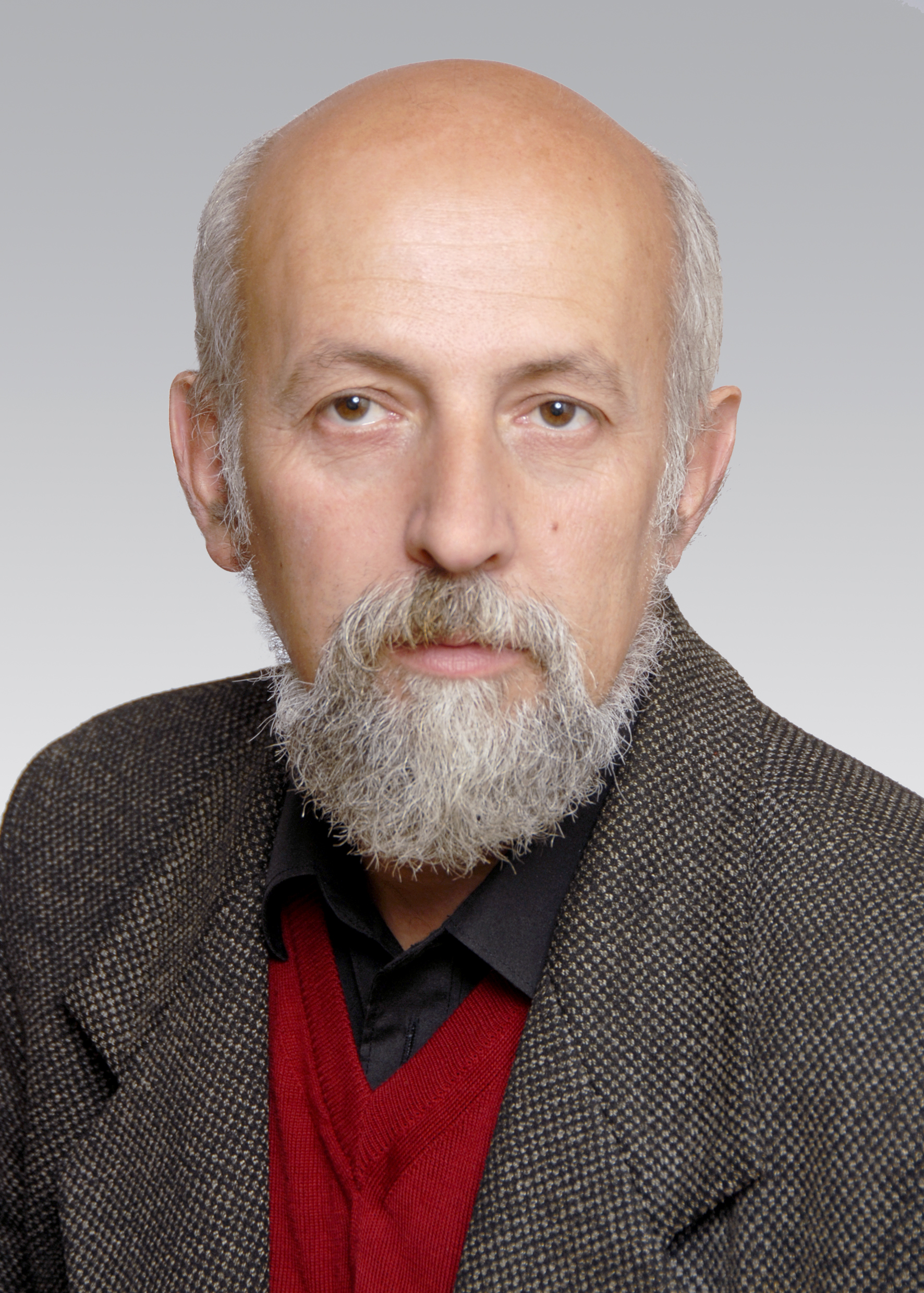
- Born: November 30, 1955 (61); Kiev, Ukrainian SSR, Soviet Union
- Education: Smolensk State University
- Known for: Sculpture, painting

Peter Fishman (Russian: Пётр Аронович Фишман; born in Kyiv in1955) is a Russian sculptor and painter of Jewish ancestry, Professor ordinarius in sculpture at the Smolensk University for Humanities.

== Life and career ==
Peter Fishman was born into a family of a serviceman in 1955. The family moved from city to city due to father’s army service. In 1967, they settled in the city of Smolensk. There Fishman started painting in the art studio of the local Palace of Pioneers; some years later he entered the Smolensk art school. After finishing the art school, he continued his education in the field of fine arts at the department of arts of the Smolensk State Pedagogical Institute. In 1978 he successfully defended his final project for a master's degree and earned praise of the state commission. His supervisor was people's artist Albert Sergeev.

From 1980 to 1986 Fishman worked as a fine art restorer at the Smolensk State Museum. Currently, in addition to creative and educational activities he is engaged in restoration of historic and artistic monuments. Since 1978 he has been participating regularly in all-Union and all-Russian exhibitions. In 1989, Fishman became a member of the Union of Artists. In 1998 and 2000, he organized the stone sculpture symposiums in Smolensk. In 2005 he was the artistic director of the creative team for the cultural exchange between the twin cities of Smolensk and Hagen, Germany.

== Awards ==
- 2005 — state grant of the Union of Artists of Russia in the field of Fine Arts
- 2004 — diploma of the Russian Academy of Arts
- 1999 — diploma of the Union of Artists of Russia

== Selected exhibitions ==
- 2013 — "The Artists of Smolensk for the city", Smolensk
- 2011 — "The Artists of Smolensk", Ivanovo
- 2010 — "The Artists of Smolensk" (Exhibition Hall of the Union of Russian Artists), Moscow
- 2009
  - Second All-Russian Exhibition of Sculpture, honoring the great sculptor Stepan Erzia, Saransk
  - All-Russian Exhibition "Russia XI», Central House of Artists, Moscow
  - Exhibition of Smolensk artists "Following the old Smolensk road," (State Exhibition Hall - Museum " Nasledie"), Moscow
- 2008 — Tenth Regional Exhibition "Artists of the central regions of Russia", Yaroslavl
- 2006 — First All-Russian Exhibition of Sculpture, Lipetsk
- 2005 — Stone International Sculpture Symposium in Hagen, Germany
- 2004 — Tenth All-Russian Exhibition "Russia" (Central Exhibition Hall), Moscow
- 2003 — Ninth Regional Exhibition "Artists of the central regions of Russia", Lipetsk
- 2002 — Interregional Exhibition "Young Russia", Bryansk
- 2001
  - Exhibition honoring the 75th Anniversary of the People's Artist of Russia, Professor Albert Sergeyev
  - A traveling exhibition of the Russian Academy of Arts, Smolensk, Moscow
  - Exhibition of Smolensk Artists, Vitebsk, Belarus
  - Exhibition of Smolensk Artists, Orsha, Belarus
- 2000
  - All-Russian Art Exhibition honoring 2000 years of Christianity, "For Thy Name's Sake"
  - All-Russian Art Exhibition "Dedicated to the Defenders of the Fatherland" honoring the 55th Anniversary of the Victory in the Great Patriotic War, Moscow
- 1999 — Ninth All-Russian Exhibition "Russia, Moscow

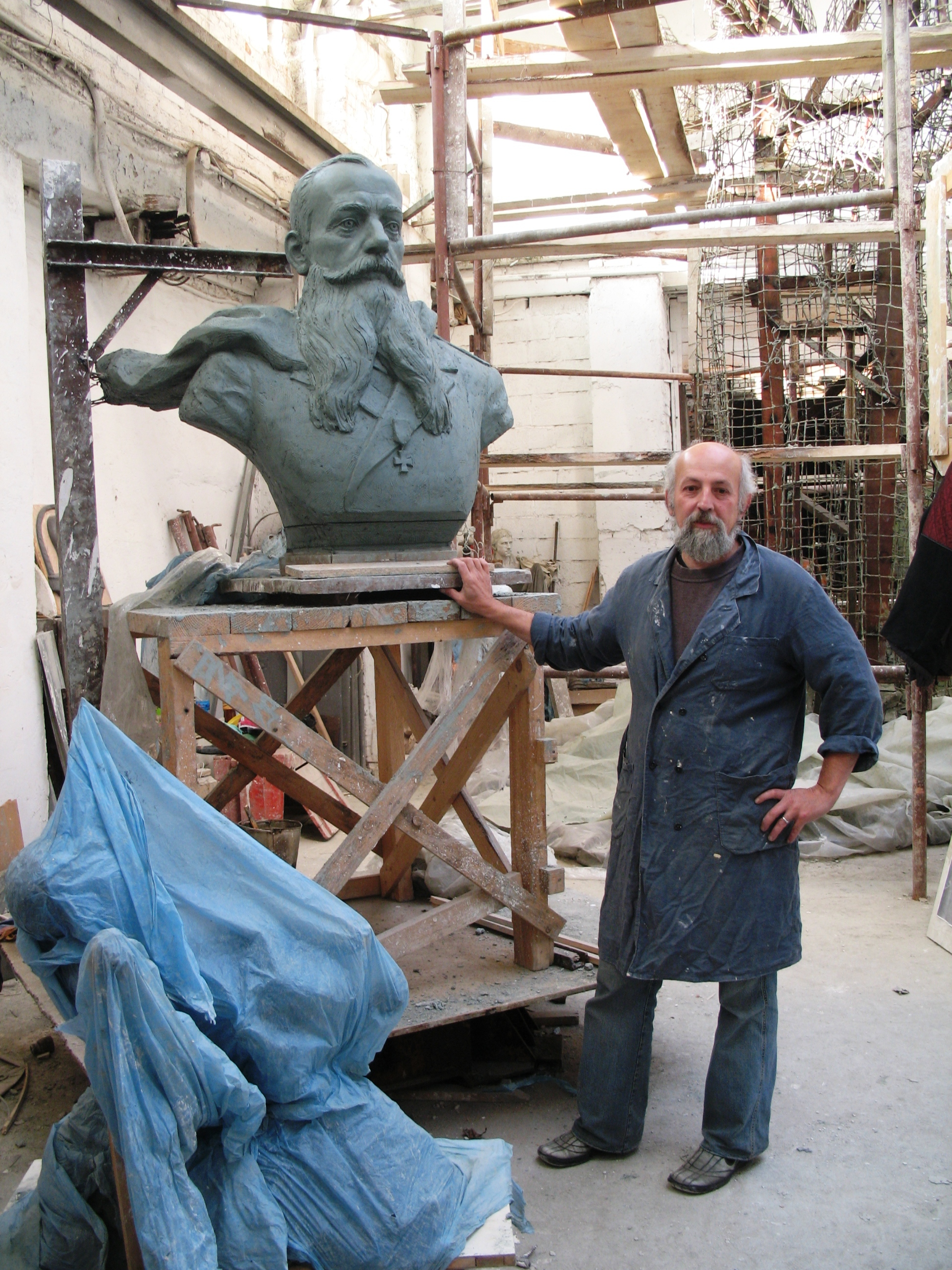
Working on the bust of Vice-admiral Makarov

- 1998
  - Regional Exhibition "Time. Space. The Man", Gagarin
  - Group Art Exhibition "The teacher and the students", Gagarin
  - Exhibition of Smolensk Artists at the Military Academy of Air Defense, Smolensk
- 1997 — Eighth Regional Exhibition "Artists of the central regions of Russia", Moscow
- 1994 — Solo exhibition, Konenkov Museum of Sculpture, Smolensk
- 1991 — Inter-republican exhibition "Monuments of the Fatherland in the works of Russian artists, Ukraine, Belarus", Smolensk, Minsk
- 1990 — Seventh Regional Art Exhibition "Artists of the central regions of Russia", Vladimir
- 1988 — All-Union Art Exhibition "Guarding the gains of socialism", Moscow
- 1987 — Republican Art Exhibition "The Artist and the Time", Moscow
- 1985
  - Second All-Russian Exhibition of Sculpture, Moscow
  - Sixth Zonal Art Exhibition "Artists of Nechernozemie"
  - Seventh Republican Art Exhibition "Soviet Russia", Moscow
- 1980 — Regional Exhibition of the Artists' Union, Smolensk
- 1979 — Regional Exhibition of the Artists' Union, Smolensk
- 1978 — All-Union Exhibition of Young Artists, Moscow

== Publication ==
- Гайдарова, Раиса Петровна. Художник - человек мира: публикации разных лет, - Смоленск : Смоленская гор. тип., 2011, с.128 ISBN 978-5-94223-696-0
- Смоленские художники «60 лет смоленской организации Союза Художников России», Смоленск 1999г, Биографическая справка с.69 ISBN 5-87210-157-0

== Monumental sculptures ==
- 2015 — Governor Aleksandr Lopatin, Bronze. Smolensk, Russia
- 2014 — Memorial Board of Russian writer Boris Vasilyev, Bronze. Smolensk, Russia
- 2013 — Memorial Board of Soviet General Ivan Chernyakhovsky, Bronze. Smolensk, Russia
- 2011 — Bust of Major General Evgeni Olenin, Bronze. Smolensk, Russia
- 2010 — Bust of Vice-admiral Stepan Makarov, Bronze. Smolensk, Russia
- 2008 — Bust of Major General Konstantin Rakutin, Bronze. Yelnya, Russia
- 2005
  - Wish fulfilling fish, Granite. Hagen, Germany
  - Phoenix, Granite. Hagen, Germany
  - Bust of Aleksandr Oleynik, Bronze. Smolensk, Russia
- 2004 — Bust of Lieutenant General Nicolay Gagen, Bronze. Yelnya, Russia
- 2002 — Bust of Major General Vasiliy Sosedov, Bronze. Smolensk, Russia
- 2001 — Nude, Granite. Hagen, Germany
- 2000 — Unique fish, Granite. Smolensk, Russia
- 1998 — Sculptor's muse, Granite. Smolensk, Russia

== Photo gallery ==
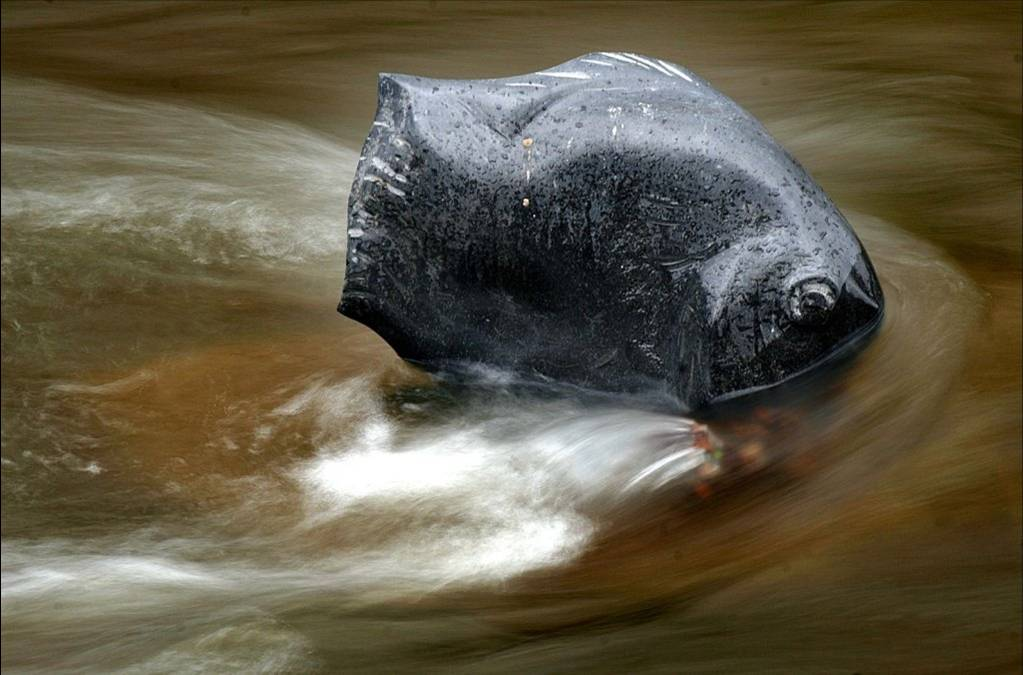
Wish fulfilling fish, Hagen city, Granite
