= Federal Service for Labour and Employment =

Federal Service for Labor and Employment, Russia

- Федеральная служба по труду и занятости (Роструд)
- Flag of the Federal Service for Labour and Employment

- Emblem of the Federal Service for Labour and Employment

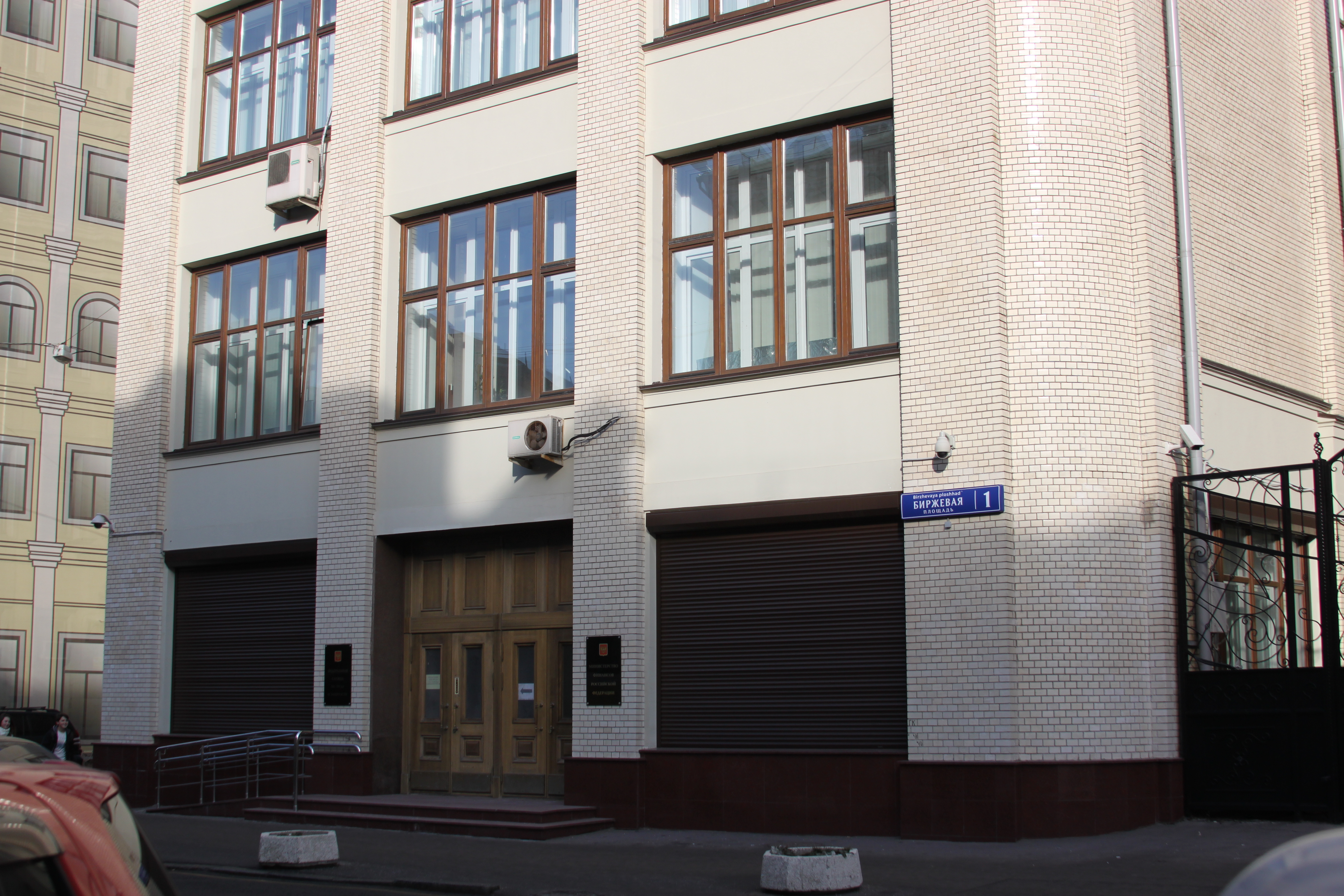
- Headquarters at the Ryabushinskih brothers' house, Birzhevaya Square

Federal agency overview
- Formed: March 9, 2004
- Headquarters: Birzhevaya Square, Moscow, Russia; 55°45′21″N 37°37′32″E
- Employees: 214
- Federal agency executive: Mikhail Ivankov
- Parent Federal agency: Ministry of Labour and Social Protection
- Website: rostrud.gov.ru

The Federal Service for Labour and Employment (Rostrud; Russian: Федеральная служба по труду и занятости (Роструд)) is the federal executive body of Russia under the jurisdiction of the Ministry of Labor and Social Protection of the Russian Federation. It carries out enforcement functions in the field of labor, employment and alternative civil service, functions to control and supervise compliance with labor laws and other regulatory legal acts containing labor law, legislation on employment of the population, alternative civil service, functions to provide public services in the field promoting employment and protection against unemployment, labor migration and the settlement of collective labor disputes.

== History ==
In the Soviet period, across the cities of the USSR, there were employment and population information bureaus. Then centers for employment, career guidance and retraining began to be created. In 1991, public employment services began to be created. Currently, employment services in the Russian Federation are subordinate to the authorities of the constituent entities of the Russian Federation.
