= List of chairmen of the Smolensk Oblast Duma =

The chairman of the Smolensk Oblast Duma is the presiding officer of that legislature.

== Chairmen ==
Name	Took office	Left office
Sergey Antufiev	1994	1998
Vladimir Anismov	1998	2006
Anatoly Misenov	2006	Present

== Sources ==
- Smolensk Oblast Duma
