= Vasily Anokhin =

Russian politician

- Василий Анохин
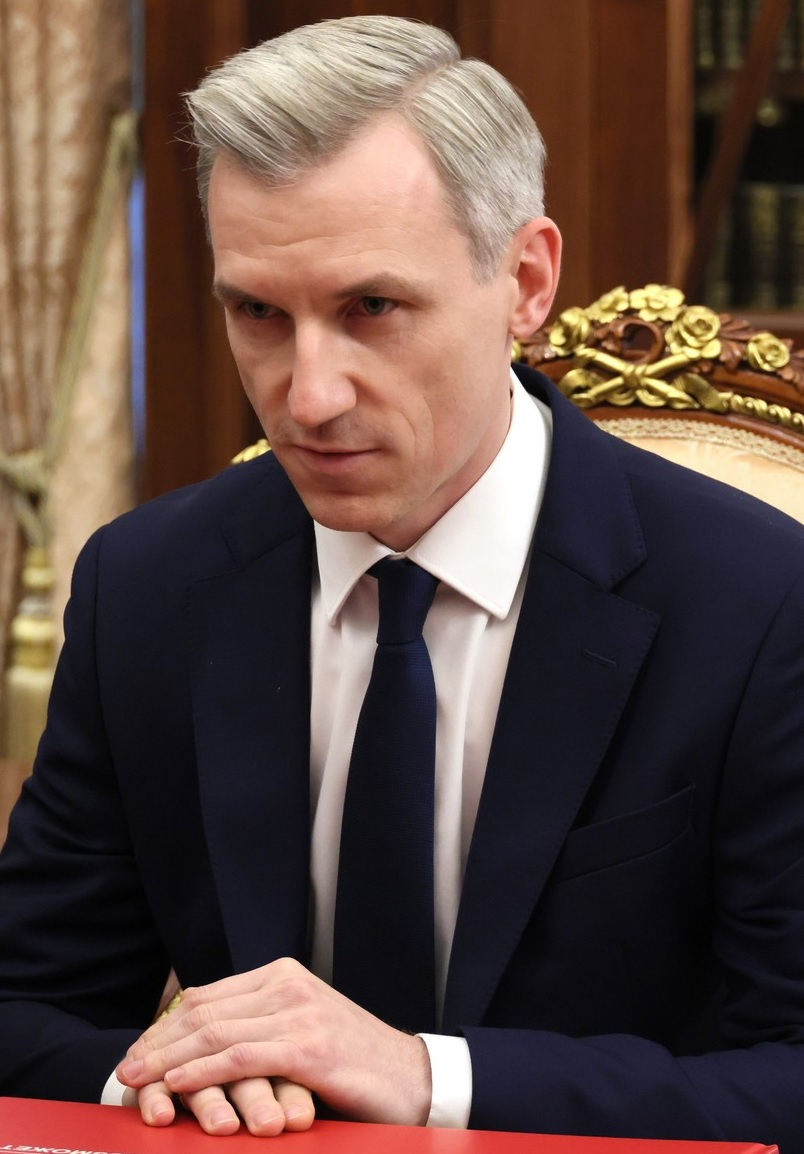
- Anokhin in 2025

7th Governor of Smolensk Oblast
- Incumbent
- Assumed office 23 September 2023
- President: Vladimir Putin
- Preceded by: Alexey Ostrovsky

Personal details
- Born: 24 May 1983 (age 42) Moscow, Russian SFSR, Soviet Union
- Profession: Economist

Vasily Nikolayevich Anokhin (Russian: Василий Николаевич Анохин; born 24 May 1983) is a Russian politician who has been the acting governor of Smolensk Oblast since 17 March 2023 following the dismissal of Alexey Ostrovsky. He was sanctioned by the US on 20 July 2023.
