= Smolensk State University =

- Смоленский государственный университет
- Type: Public
- Established: 1918
- Location: Przhevalsky 4 street, Smolensk, Russia; 57°47′05″N 32°02′44″E
- Campus: urban
- Website: www.smolgu.ru
- Building details
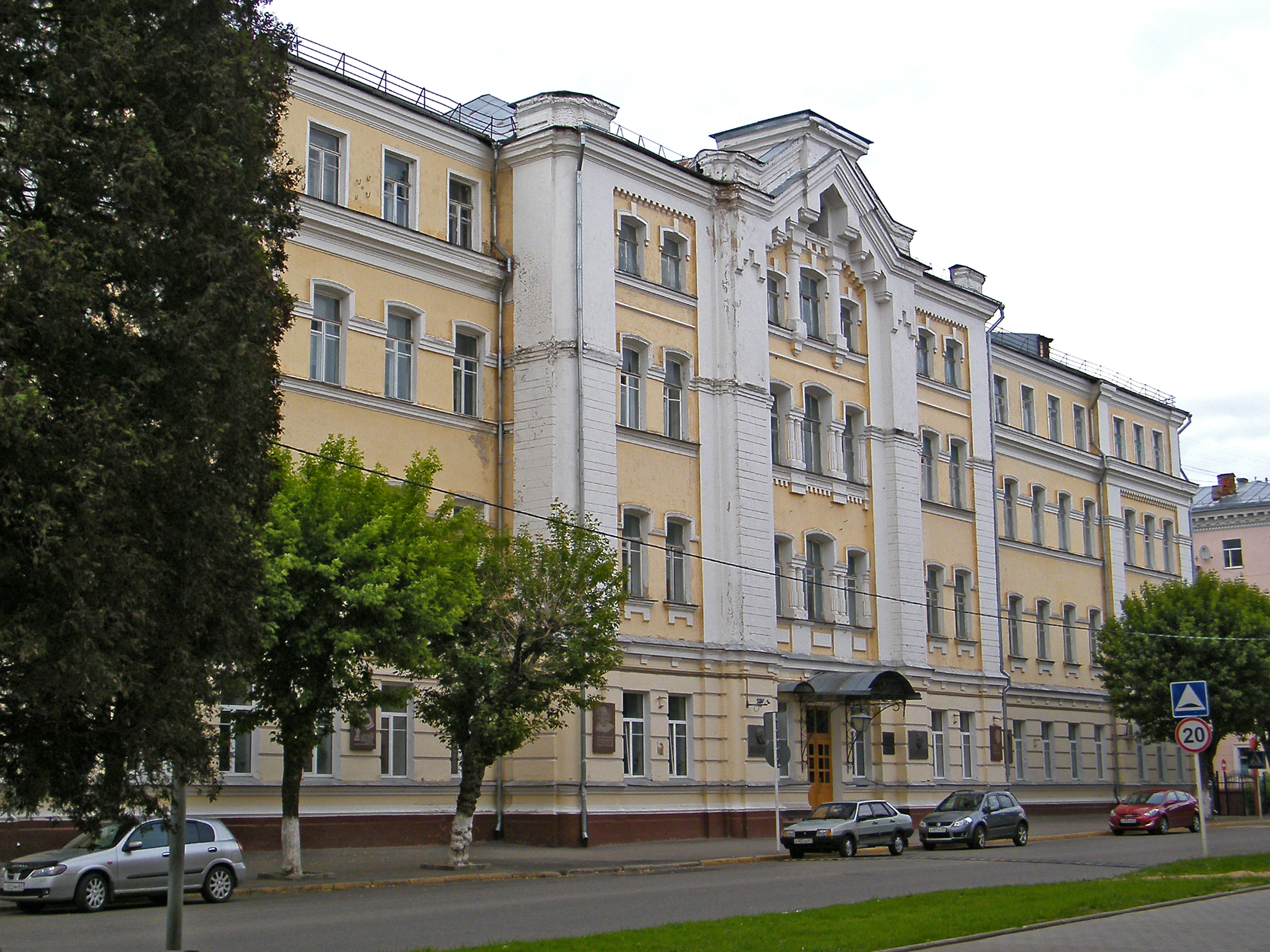
- Main campus building

Smolensk State University (Russian: Смоленский государственный университет (СмолГУ)) is a public university located in Smolensk, Smolensk Oblast, Russia.

== History ==
It was formed on November 7, 1918, by a decree of the Council of People's Commissars. Initially, the university combined humanitarian, natural-scientific and medical educational directions. In accordance with the government decision on the reform of higher and secondary vocational education, by order of the People's Commissariat of Education of the RSFSR of April 18, 1930, the university was reorganized into two independent institutes: the Smolensk State Pedagogical Institute of the People's Commissariat of the RSFSR and the Smolensk State Medical Institute of the People's Commissariat of the RSFSR.

On January 13, 1998, by the order of the Ministry of Education of the Russian Federation, Smolensk State Pedagogical Institute was renamed Smolensk State Pedagogical University. The modern stage of the university's history begins on December 19, 2005, when, by the order of the Federal Agency for Education, the state educational institution of higher education "Smolensk State Pedagogical University" was renamed "Smolensk State University" (SmolSU), thus, elevating its status to a classical university.

On April 13, 2011, the organizational form of the university was changed and it became a budgetary institution.

In 2018, it became possible to study theology at Smolensk State University.

In 2019, students studying classical history and jurisprudence were expelled from Smolensk State University because their majors lost accreditation. Though students were initially offered the choice of studying in another institution or waiting for re-accreditation, the students who decided to continue studying at SmolSU weren't warned that they would be expelled.

In 2021, it became known that the students from Belarus, Afghanistan, Haiti, Uzbekistan, Mali were going to become the students of Smolensk State University. The local press criticizes teaching foreign students, for 30% foreigners were expelled from Smolensk State University, according to reports.

In recent years, SmolSU has signed cooperation agreements with other universities. These include a plan for joint programs with Voronezh State University, and student exchanges with Hebei University of Technology.

== Notable alumni ==
- Peter Fishman, sculptor
- Aleksandr Kurosh, mathematician
