= Smolensk Oblast Duma =

Regional parliament of Smolensk Oblast, Russia

Smolensk Oblast Duma Смоленская областная дума
- 8th legislature

Type
- Type: Unicameral

Leadership
- Chairman: Igor Lyakhov, United Russia since 26 September 2013

Structure
- Seats: 48
- Political groups: United Russia (41) LDPR (4) CPRF (3)

Elections
- Voting system: Mixed
- Last election: 8-10 September 2023
- Next election: 2028

Meeting place
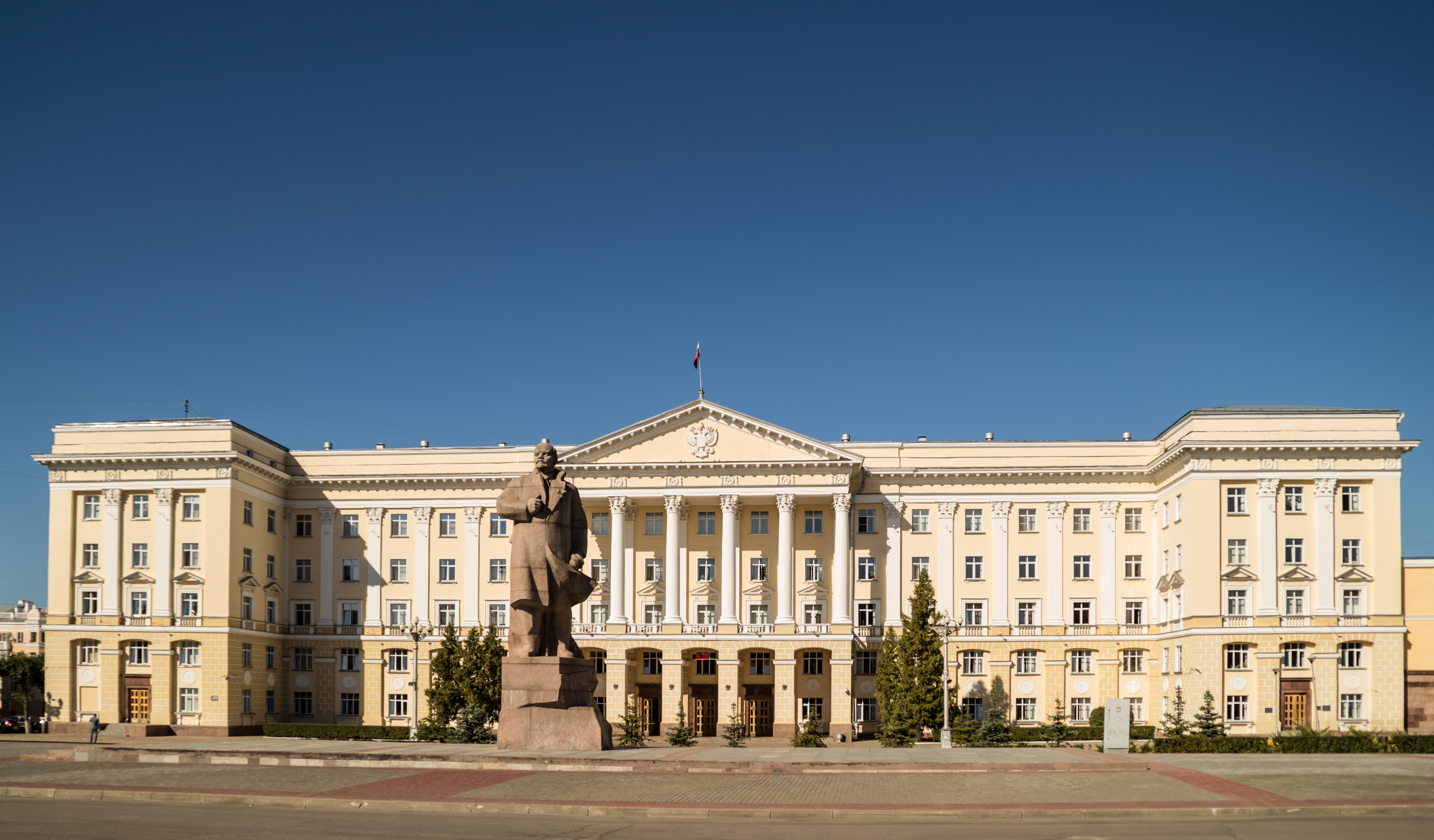
- 1 Lenin Square, Smolensk

Website
- smoloblduma.ru

The Smolensk Oblast Duma (Russian: Смоленская областная дума, romanized: Smolenskaya oblastnaya duma) is the regional parliament of Smolensk Oblast, a federal subject of Russia. A total of 48 deputies are elected for five-year terms.

== Elections ==
=== 2013 ===
Party	%	Seats
United Russia	41.17	36
Communist Party of the Russian Federation	15.02	5
Liberal Democratic Party of Russia	13.49	4
A Just Russia	7.58	2
Russian Party of Pensioners for Social Justice	6.07	1
Registered voters/turnout	25.17	

=== 2018 ===
Party	%	Seats
United Russia	36.43	26
Communist Party of the Russian Federation	22.91	12
Liberal Democratic Party of Russia	19.73	6
Russian Party of Pensioners for Social Justice	9.31	2
A Just Russia	7.79	2
Registered voters/turnout	23.75	

=== 2023 ===
Party	%	Seats
United Russia	36.43	41
Liberal Democratic Party of Russia	11.25	4
Communist Party of the Russian Federation	9.83	3
Party of Pensioners	4.56	0
A Just Russia	4.32	0
New People	4.21	0
Communists of Russia	4.05	0
The Greens	1.13	0
Invalid ballots	3.25	
Registered voters/turnout	33.68	
