= Smolensk Oblast =

First-level administrative division of Russia

Smolensk Oblast Смоленская область (Russian)
- Oblast
- Flag Coat of arms

- Coordinates: 55°00′N 33°00′E
- Country: Russia
- Federal district: Central
- Economic region: Central
- Established: September 27, 1937
- Administrative center: Smolensk

Government
  - Body: Oblast Duma
  - Governor: Vasily Anokhin

Area
  - Total: 49,779 km^{2} (19,220 sq mi)
  - Rank: 53rd

Population (2021 census)
  - Total: 888,421
  - Estimate (2018): 949,348
  - Rank: 57th
  - Density: 17.847/km^{2} (46.224/sq mi)
  - Urban: 72.6%
  - Rural: 27.4%

GDP (nominal, 2024)
  - Total: ₽655 billion (US$7.69 billion)
  - Per capita: ₽761,465 (US$8,935.18)
- Time zone: UTC+3 (MSK)
- ISO 3166 code: RU-SMO
- License plates: 67
- OKTMO ID: 66000000
- Official languages: Russian
- Website: admin-smolensk.ru

Smolensk Oblast (Note: Russian: Смоленская область, romanized: Smolenskaya oblastʹ), informally also called Smolenshchina, (Note: Russian: Смоленщина) is a federal subject of Russia (an oblast). Its administrative centre is the city of Smolensk. As of the 2021 Census, its population was 888,421.

== Geography ==
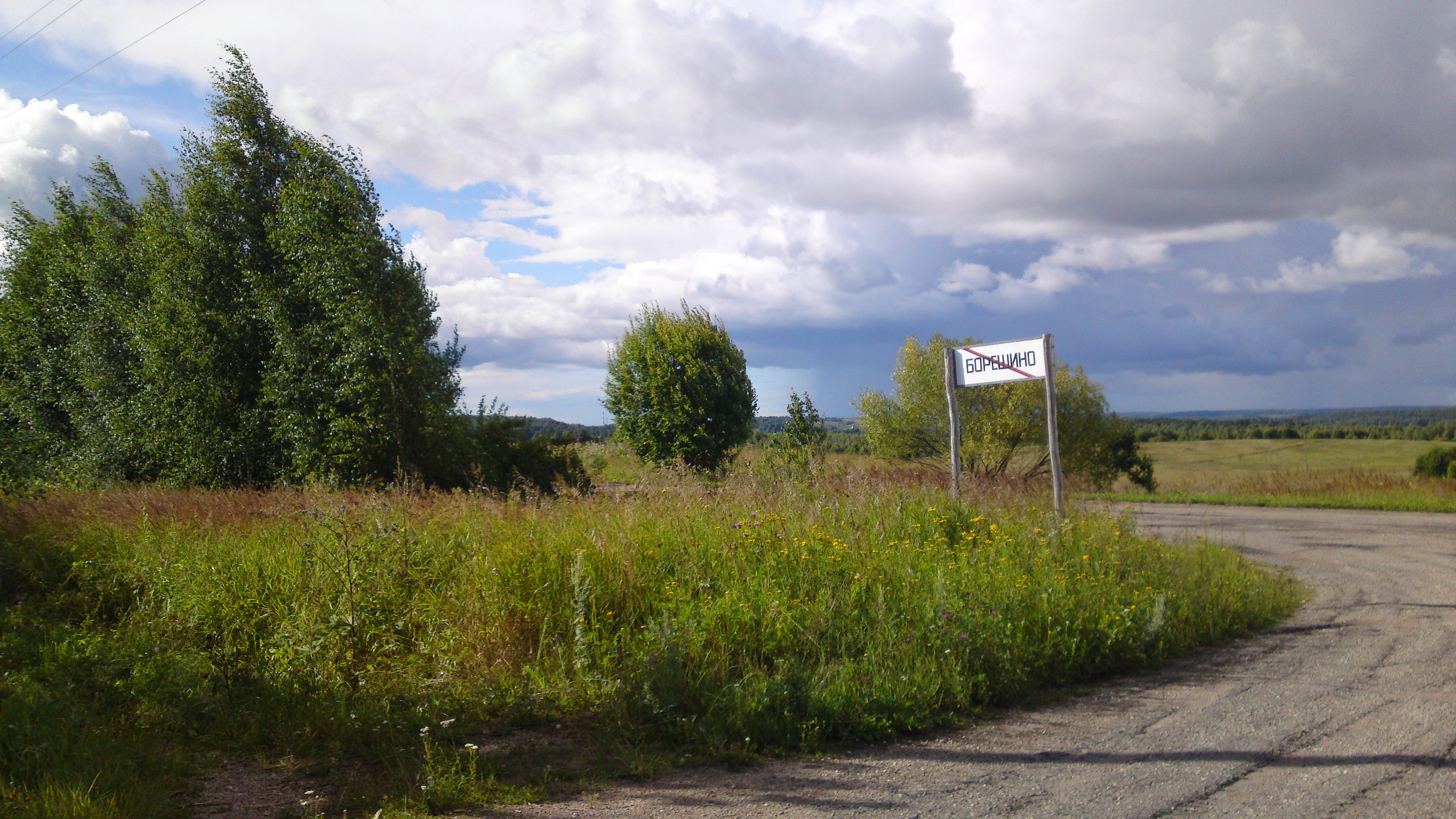
Roslavlsky old tract, the village of Boreshino

The oblast was founded on 27 September 1937. It borders Pskov Oblast in the north, Tver Oblast in the northeast, Moscow Oblast in the east, Kaluga Oblast in south, Bryansk Oblast in the southwest, and Mogilev and Vitebsk Oblasts of Belarus, in the west and northwest, as part of the Belarus–Russia border.

=== Hydrography ===
The main river of the region is the Dnieper river and its tributaries, Desna, Vop, Vyazma. By the rivers of the Volga basin and its tributary Vazuza Gzhat and tributary of the Oka river, Ugra. To the north-west flows a short section of the Western Dvina River and its tributary river Kasplya.

Among the major reservoirs supplying water are Moscow Vazuzssky Yauza and reservoirs in the north-east, as well as cooling power plants, Smolensk reservoir in the north near the village of Lake and Desnogorsk Reservoir in the south area of the city near the Desnogorsk.

=== Climate ===
The climate of Smolensk Oblast is humid continental, similar to the climate of Moscow Oblast, but slightly warmer in winter due to being located further west. Summers are short, warm and rainy, while winters are long, cold and snowy. Average temperatures range from −9 °C (16 °F) in January to 17 °C (63 °F) in July (although in the south it ranges from −8 °C (18 °F) in January to 18 °C (64 °F) in July). Annual precipitation varies from 630 to 730 mm (25 to 29 in) per year.

== Politics ==
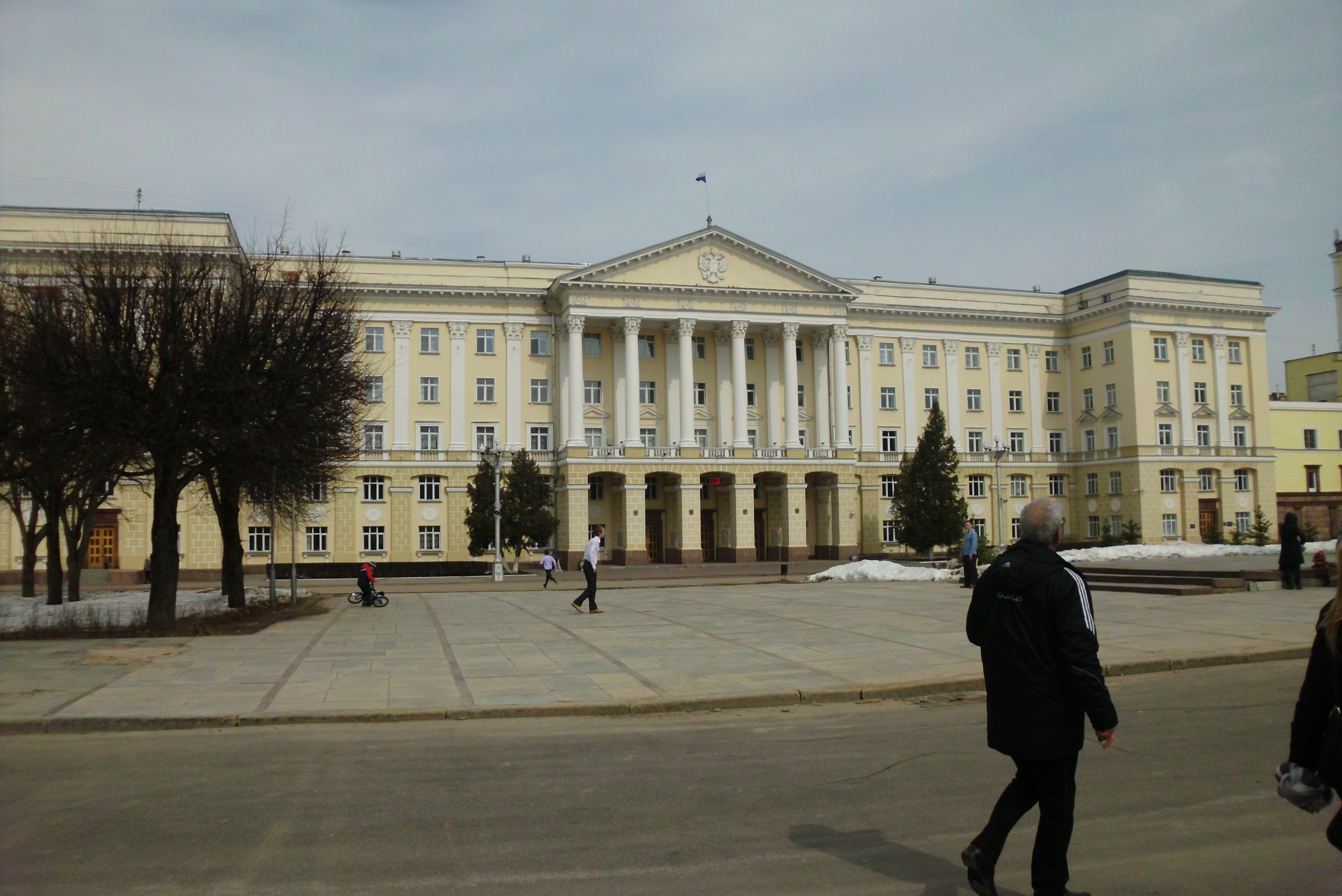
Building of the Oblast Administration

During the Soviet period, the high authority in the oblast was shared between three persons: The first secretary of the Smolensk CPSU Committee (who in reality had the biggest authority), the chairman of the oblast Soviet (legislative power), and the Chairman of the oblast Executive Committee (executive power). Since 1991, CPSU lost all the power, and the head of the Oblast administration, and eventually the governor was appointed/elected alongside elected regional parliament.

The Charter of Smolensk Oblast is the fundamental law of the region. The Legislative Assembly of Smolensk is the province's standing legislative (representative) body. The Legislative Assembly exercises its authority by passing laws, resolutions, and other legal acts and by supervising the implementation and observance of the laws and other legal acts passed by it. The highest executive body is the Oblast Government, which includes territorial executive bodies such as district administrations, committees, and commissions that facilitate development and run the day to day matters of the province. The Oblast administration supports the activities of the Governor who is the highest official and acts as guarantor of the observance of the oblast Charter in accordance with the Constitution of Russia. From July 1941-September 1943 part of region fell to Germany.

== Administrative divisions ==
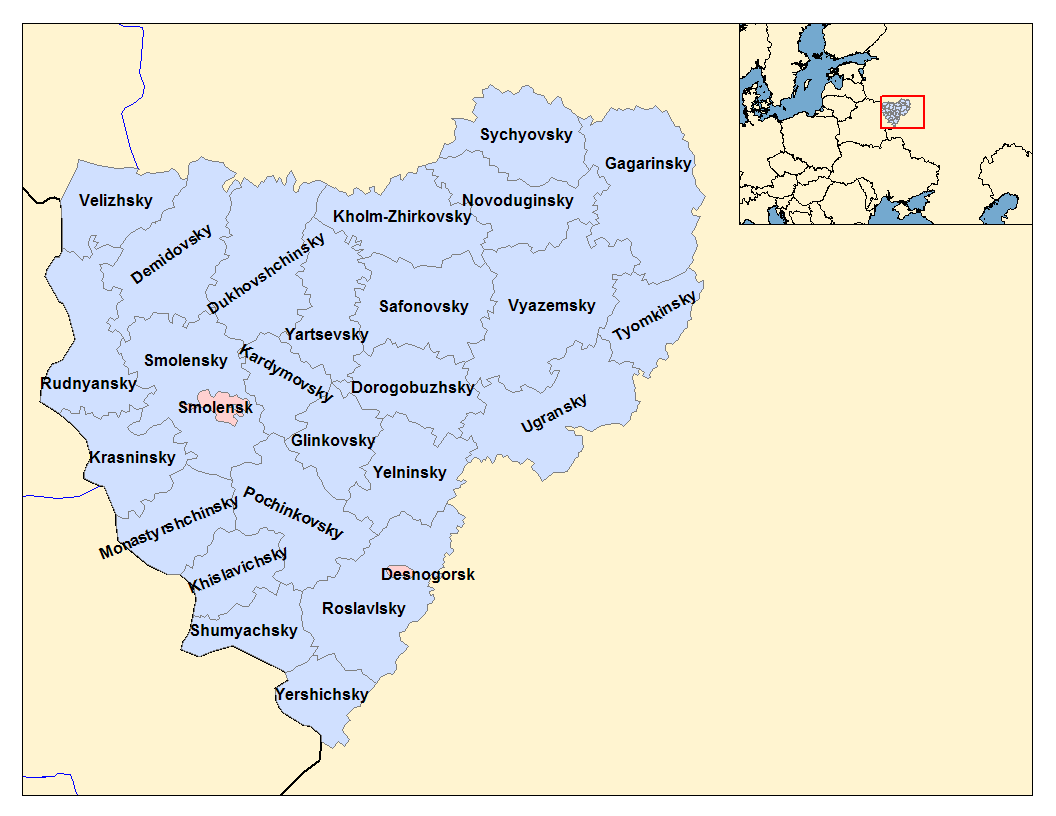
Administrative divisions of Smolensk Oblast

Smolensk Oblast is divided into 25 districts (raions) and two cities, which are further divided into 15 towns, 12 urban-type settlements, and 302 rural okrugs.

== Demographics ==
Historical population
Year	Pop.	±%
1897	1,525,279	—
1926	2,292,712	+50.3%
1959	1,142,969	−50.1%
1970	1,106,066	−3.2%
1979	1,120,748	+1.3%
1989	1,158,299	+3.4%
2002	1,049,574	−9.4%
2010	985,537	−6.1%
2021	888,421	−9.9%
2025	857,847	−3.4%
Source: Census data, estimate

Population: 888,421 (2021 census); 985,537 (2010 census); 1,049,574 (2002 census); 1,158,299 (1989 Soviet census).

Vital statistics for 2024:

- Births: 4,931 (5.7 per 1,000)
- Deaths: 13,153 (15.3 per 1,000)

Total fertility rate (2024):
1.05 children per woman

Life expectancy (2021):
Total — 68.00 years (male — 63.28, female — 72.83)

Ethnic composition (2010):

- Russians: 94.6%
- Ukrainians: 1.3%
- Belarusians: 1.3%
- Armenians: 0.5%
- Others: 2.3%
- 41,457 people were registered from administrative databases, and could not declare an ethnicity. It is estimated that the proportion of ethnicities in this group is the same as that of the declared group.

=== Religion ===
Religion in Smolensk Oblast as of 2012 (Sreda Arena Atlas)
Russian Orthodoxy	29%
Other Orthodox	1.9%
Old Believers	1.5%
Roman Catholic	0.6%
Protestantism	0.5%
Other Christians	6.6%
Spiritual but not religious	36.9%
Atheism and irreligion	14%
Other and undeclared	9%

According to a 2012 survey 19.5% of the population of Smolensk Oblast adheres to the Russian Orthodox Church, 7% are unaffiliated generic Christians, 3% are Orthodox Christian believers who do not belong to church or belong to other (non-Russian) Orthodox churches, 2% are Old Believers, 1% are adherents of the Slavic native faith (Rodnovery) movement, 0.4% are members of the Catholic Church. In addition, 45% of the population declares to be "spiritual but not religious", 13% is atheist, and 9.1% follows other religions or did not give an answer to the question.

== Economy ==
Smolensk Oblast has a diverse economy, and exports large amounts of ammonium nitrate, fertilizers, wheat, and wood. The top exports in 2021 were fertilizers (19.2%, $284M), wood products (13.2%, $194M), wheat (9.8%, $144M), and machinery (7.6%, $112M).

== Notable people ==
- Isaac Asimov (1920–1992), an American writer and professor of biochemistry, born in Petrovichi
- Yuri Gagarin (1934–1968), a Soviet pilot and cosmonaut and the first man in space, born in Klushino
- Shmuel Schneersohn (1834–1882) an Orthodox rabbi, born in Lyubavichi
- Ivan Sidorenko (1919–1994) a Red Army officer and sniper, born in Glinkovsky District
- Andrey Nikolayevich Tikhonov (1906–1993) a Russian mathematician and geophysicist, born in Gzhatsk
- Mikhail Tukhachevsky (1893–1937) nicknamed the Red Napoleon by foreign newspapers, a Soviet general

== See also ==
- 2010 Polish presidential airplane crash
- Katyn massacre
- List of Chairmen of the Smolensk Oblast Duma
