= Sloboda (rural locality) =

Sloboda (Russian: Слобода) is the name of several rural localities in Russia.

== Modern localities ==
=== Arkhangelsk Oblast ===
As of 2012, two rural localities in Arkhangelsk Oblast bear this name:

- Sloboda, Vilegodsky District, Arkhangelsk Oblast, a selo in Pavlovsky Selsoviet of Vilegodsky District
- Sloboda, Vinogradovsky District, Arkhangelsk Oblast, a village in Osinovsky Selsoviet of Vinogradovsky District

=== Bryansk Oblast ===
As of 2012, four rural localities in Bryansk Oblast bear this name:

- Sloboda, Karachevsky District, Bryansk Oblast, a village under the administrative jurisdiction of Karachev Urban Administrative Okrug in Karachevsky District; 53°7′N 35°2′E
- Sloboda, Mglinsky District, Bryansk Oblast, a village in Molodkovsky Rural Administrative Okrug of Mglinsky District; 53°14′N 32°50′E
- Sloboda, Rognedinsky District, Bryansk Oblast, a village in Fedorovsky Rural Administrative Okrug of Rognedinsky District; 53°56′N 33°29′E
- Sloboda, Trubchevsky District, Bryansk Oblast, a village in Usokhsky Rural Administrative Okrug of Trubchevsky District; 52°37′N 33°52′E

=== Republic of Buryatia ===
As of 2012, one rural locality in the Republic of Buryatia bears this name:

- Sloboda, Republic of Buryatia, a selo in Poselsky Selsoviet of Bichursky District

=== Ivanovo Oblast ===
As of 2012, one rural locality in Ivanovo Oblast bears this name:

- Sloboda, Ivanovo Oblast, a village in Verkhnelandekhovsky District

=== Kaluga Oblast ===
As of 2012, seven rural localities in Kaluga Oblast bear this name:

- Sloboda, Babyninsky District, Kaluga Oblast, a village in Babyninsky District
- Sloboda (Barsuki Rural Settlement), Dzerzhinsky District, Kaluga Oblast, a village in Dzerzhinsky District; municipally, a part of Barsuki Rural Settlement of that district
- Sloboda (Ugorskaya Rural Settlement), Dzerzhinsky District, Kaluga Oblast, a village in Dzerzhinsky District; municipally, a part of Ugorskaya Rural Settlement of that district
- Sloboda, Khvastovichsky District, Kaluga Oblast, a selo in Khvastovichsky District
- Sloboda, Kozelsky District, Kaluga Oblast, a village in Kozelsky District
- Sloboda, Medynsky District, Kaluga Oblast, a village in Medynsky District
- Sloboda, Sukhinichsky District, Kaluga Oblast, a village in Sukhinichsky District

=== Kirov Oblast ===
As of 2012, three rural localities in Kirov Oblast bear this name:

- Sloboda, Afanasyevsky District, Kirov Oblast, a village in Ichetovkinsky Rural Okrug of Afanasyevsky District; 58°41′N 53°41′E
- Sloboda, Kotelnichsky District, Kirov Oblast, a village in Spassky Rural Okrug of Kotelnichsky District; 58°39′N 48°11′E
- Sloboda, Nagorsky District, Kirov Oblast, a village in Nagorsky Rural Okrug of Nagorsky District; 50°25′N 50°42′E

=== Komi Republic ===
As of 2012, one rural locality in the Komi Republic bears this name:

- Sloboda, Komi Republic, a village in Kuratovo Selo Administrative Territory of Sysolsky District; 60°54′N 49°45′E

=== Kostroma Oblast ===
As of 2012, two rural localities in Kostroma Oblast bear this name:

- Sloboda, Antropovsky District, Kostroma Oblast, a village in Kotelnikovskoye Settlement of Antropovsky District; 57°59′N 42°48′E
- Sloboda, Kostromskoy District, Kostroma Oblast, a village in Kuzmishchenskoye Settlement of Kostromskoy District; 57°53′N 41°14′E

=== Kursk Oblast ===
As of 2012, one rural locality in Kursk Oblast bears this name:

- Sloboda, Kursk Oblast, a village in Troitskokrasnyansky Selsoviet of Shchigrovsky District

=== Lipetsk Oblast ===
As of 2012, one rural locality in Lipetsk Oblast bears this name:

- Sloboda, Lipetsk Oblast, a selo in Slobodskoy Selsoviet of Izmalkovsky District; 52°42′N 37°55′E

=== Moscow Oblast ===
As of 2012, four rural localities in Moscow Oblast bear this name:

- Sloboda, Klinsky District, Moscow Oblast, a village in Voroninskoye Rural Settlement of Klinsky District; 56°28′N 36°52′E
- Sloboda, Leninsky District, Moscow Oblast, a village in Razvilkovskoye Rural Settlement of Leninsky District; 55°36′N 37°49′E
- Sloboda, Ruzsky District, Moscow Oblast, a village in Volkovskoye Rural Settlement of Ruzsky District; 55°53′N 36°21′E
- Sloboda, Shatursky District, Moscow Oblast, a village under the administrative jurisdiction of the Town of Shatura in Shatursky District; 55°35′N 39°25′E

=== Novgorod Oblast ===
As of 2012, three rural localities in Novgorod Oblast bear this name:

- Sloboda, Chudovsky District, Novgorod Oblast, a village in Uspenskoye Settlement of Chudovsky District
- Sloboda, Lyubytinsky District, Novgorod Oblast, a village under the administrative jurisdiction of Lyubytinskoye Settlement in Lyubytinsky District
- Sloboda, Parfinsky District, Novgorod Oblast, a village in Fedorkovskoye Settlement of Parfinsky District

=== Omsk Oblast ===
As of 2012, one rural locality in Omsk Oblast bears this name:

- Sloboda, Omsk Oblast, a village in Zavyalovsky Rural Okrug of Znamensky District; 57°7′N 73°34′E

=== Oryol Oblast ===
As of 2012, three rural localities in Oryol Oblast bear this name:

- Sloboda, Mtsensky District, Oryol Oblast, a village in Bashkatovsky Selsoviet of Mtsensky District; 53°14′N 36°12′E
- Sloboda, Sverdlovsky District, Oryol Oblast, a village in Koshelevsky Selsoviet of Sverdlovsky District; 52°38′N 36°12′E
- Sloboda, Zalegoshchensky District, Oryol Oblast, a village in Nizhne-Zalegoshchensky Selsoviet of Zalegoshchensky District; 52°52′N 36°51′E

=== Perm Krai ===
As of 2012, one rural locality in Perm Krai bears this name:

- Sloboda, Perm Krai, a village in Cherdynsky District

=== Pskov Oblast ===
As of 2012, five rural localities in Pskov Oblast bear this name:

- Sloboda, Bezhanitsky District, Pskov Oblast, a village in Bezhanitsky District
- Sloboda, Gdovsky District, Pskov Oblast, a village in Gdovsky District
- Sloboda, Porkhovsky District, Pskov Oblast, two villages in Porkhovsky District
- Sloboda, Pskovsky District, Pskov Oblast, a village in Pskovsky District

=== Ryazan Oblast ===
As of 2012, two rural localities in Ryazan Oblast bear this name:

- Sloboda, Rybnovsky District, Ryazan Oblast, a village in Markovsky Rural Okrug of Rybnovsky District
- Sloboda, Shilovsky District, Ryazan Oblast, a village in Muratovsky Rural Okrug of Shilovsky District

=== Smolensk Oblast ===
As of 2012, twenty rural localities in Smolensk Oblast bear this name:

- Sloboda, Demidovsky District, Smolensk Oblast, a village in Dubrovskoye Rural Settlement of Demidovsky District
- Sloboda, Gagarinsky District, Smolensk Oblast, a village in Pokrovskoye Rural Settlement of Gagarinsky District
- Sloboda, Cherepovskoye Rural Settlement, Khislavichsky District, Smolensk Oblast, a village in Cherepovskoye Rural Settlement of Khislavichsky District
- Sloboda, Upinskoye Rural Settlement, Khislavichsky District, Smolensk Oblast, a village in Upinskoye Rural Settlement of Khislavichsky District
- Sloboda, Krasninsky District, Smolensk Oblast, a village in Oktyabrskoye Rural Settlement of Krasninsky District
- Sloboda, Alexandrovskoye Rural Settlement, Monastyrshchinsky District, Smolensk Oblast, a village in Alexandrovskoye Rural Settlement of Monastyrshchinsky District
- Sloboda, Dobroselskoye Rural Settlement, Monastyrshchinsky District, Smolensk Oblast, a village in Dobroselskoye Rural Settlement of Monastyrshchinsky District
- Sloboda, Slobodskoye Rural Settlement, Monastyrshchinsky District, Smolensk Oblast, a village in Slobodskoye Rural Settlement of Monastyrshchinsky District
- Sloboda, Tatarskoye Rural Settlement, Monastyrshchinsky District, Smolensk Oblast, a village in Tatarskoye Rural Settlement of Monastyrshchinsky District
- Sloboda, Tatarskoye Rural Settlement, Monastyrshchinsky District, Smolensk Oblast, a village in Tatarskoye Rural Settlement of Monastyrshchinsky District
- Sloboda, Pochinkovsky District, Smolensk Oblast, a village in Dankovskoye Rural Settlement of Pochinkovsky District
- Sloboda, Roslavlsky District, Smolensk Oblast, a village in Astapkovichskoye Rural Settlement of Roslavlsky District
- Sloboda, Kazimirovskoye Rural Settlement, Rudnyansky District, Smolensk Oblast, a village in Kazimirovskoye Rural Settlement of Rudnyansky District
- Sloboda, Ponizovskoye Rural Settlement, Rudnyansky District, Smolensk Oblast, a village in Ponizovskoye Rural Settlement of Rudnyansky District
- Sloboda, Smoligovskoye Rural Settlement, Rudnyansky District, Smolensk Oblast, a village in Smoligovskoye Rural Settlement of Rudnyansky District
- Sloboda, Shumyachsky District, Smolensk Oblast, a village in Pervomayskoye Rural Settlement of Shumyachsky District
- Sloboda, Divasovskoye Rural Settlement, Smolensky District, Smolensk Oblast, a village in Divasovskoye Rural Settlement of Smolensky District
- Sloboda, Loinskoye Rural Settlement, Smolensky District, Smolensk Oblast, a village in Loinskoye Rural Settlement of Smolensky District
- Sloboda, Pionerskoye Rural Settlement, Smolensky District, Smolensk Oblast, a village in Pionerskoye Rural Settlement of Smolensky District
- Sloboda, Vyazemsky District, Smolensk Oblast, a village in Kaydakovskoye Rural Settlement of Vyazemsky District

=== Sverdlovsk Oblast ===
As of 2012, one rural locality in Sverdlovsk Oblast bears this name:

- Sloboda, Sverdlovsk Oblast, a selo under the administrative jurisdiction of the City of Pervouralsk

=== Tula Oblast ===
As of 2012, three rural localities in Tula Oblast bear this name:

- Sloboda, Slobodskoy Rural Okrug, Belyovsky District, Tula Oblast, a village in Slobodskoy Rural Okrug of Belyovsky District
- Sloboda, Taratukhinsky Rural Okrug, Belyovsky District, Tula Oblast, a village in Taratukhinsky Rural Okrug of Belyovsky District
- Sloboda, Dubensky District, Tula Oblast, a village in Voskresensky Rural Okrug of Dubensky District

=== Tver Oblast ===
As of 2012, seven rural localities in Tver Oblast bear this name:

- Sloboda, Kalininsky District, Tver Oblast, a village in Mednovskoye Rural Settlement of Kalininsky District
- Sloboda, Kashinsky District, Tver Oblast, a village in Shepelevskoye Rural Settlement of Kashinsky District
- Sloboda, Konakovsky District, Tver Oblast, a village in Staromelkovskoye Rural Settlement of Konakovsky District
- Sloboda, Krasnokholmsky District, Tver Oblast, a village in Barbinskoye Rural Settlement of Krasnokholmsky District
- Sloboda, Molokovsky District, Tver Oblast, a village in Molokovskoye Rural Settlement of Molokovsky District
- Sloboda, Ostashkovsky District, Tver Oblast, a village in Botovskoye Rural Settlement of Ostashkovsky District
- Sloboda, Staritsky District, Tver Oblast, a village in Staritsa Rural Settlement of Staritsky District

=== Vladimir Oblast ===
As of 2012, one rural locality in Vladimir Oblast bears this name:

- Sloboda, Vladimir Oblast, a village in Kolchuginsky District

=== Vologda Oblast ===
As of 2012, twelve rural localities in Vologda Oblast bear this name:

- Sloboda, Afanasovsky Selsoviet, Babayevsky District, Vologda Oblast, a village in Afanasovsky Selsoviet of Babayevsky District
- Sloboda, Kuysky Selsoviet, Babayevsky District, Vologda Oblast, a village in Kuysky Selsoviet of Babayevsky District
- Sloboda, Belozersky District, Vologda Oblast, a village in Sholsky Selsoviet of Belozersky District
- Sloboda, Anokhinsky Selsoviet, Gryazovetsky District, Vologda Oblast, a village in Anokhinsky Selsoviet of Gryazovetsky District
- Sloboda, Pertsevsky Selsoviet, Gryazovetsky District, Vologda Oblast, a village in Pertsevsky Selsoviet of Gryazovetsky District
- Sloboda, Kaduysky District, Vologda Oblast, a village in Nikolsky Selsoviet of Kaduysky District
- Sloboda, Kichmengsko-Gorodetsky District, Vologda Oblast, a village in Pyzhugsky Selsoviet of Kichmengsko-Gorodetsky District
- Sloboda, Nyuksensky District, Vologda Oblast, a village in Gorodishchensky Selsoviet of Nyuksensky District
- Sloboda, Sokolsky District, Vologda Oblast, a village in Prigorodny Selsoviet of Sokolsky District
- Sloboda, Totemsky District, Vologda Oblast, a village in Manylovsky Selsoviet of Totemsky District
- Sloboda, Verkhovazhsky District, Vologda Oblast, a village in Lipetsky Selsoviet of Verkhovazhsky District
- Sloboda, Vologodsky District, Vologda Oblast, a village in Nesvoysky Selsoviet of Vologodsky District

=== Voronezh Oblast ===
As of 2012, one rural locality in Voronezh Oblast bears this name:

- Sloboda, Voronezh Oblast, a selo in Slobodskoye Rural Settlement of Bobrovsky District

=== Yaroslavl Oblast ===
As of 2012, seven rural localities in Yaroslavl Oblast bear this name:

- Sloboda, Danilovsky District, Yaroslavl Oblast, a village in Slobodskoy Rural Okrug of Danilovsky District
- Sloboda, Gavrilov-Yamsky District, Yaroslavl Oblast, a village in Mitinsky Rural Okrug of Gavrilov-Yamsky District
- Sloboda, Lyubimsky District, Yaroslavl Oblast, a village in Pigalevsky Rural Okrug of Lyubimsky District
- Sloboda, Pervomaysky District, Yaroslavl Oblast, a village in Prechistensky Rural Okrug of Pervomaysky District
- Sloboda, Poshekhonsky District, Yaroslavl Oblast, a village in Priukhrinsky Rural Okrug of Poshekhonsky District
- Sloboda, Ilyinsky Rural Okrug, Uglichsky District, Yaroslavl Oblast, a village in Ilyinsky Rural Okrug of Uglichsky District
- Sloboda, Slobodskoy Rural Okrug, Uglichsky District, Yaroslavl Oblast, a village in Slobodskoy Rural Okrug of Uglichsky District

== Renamed localities ==
- Sloboda, name of Povorskaya Sloboda, a village in Pokrovskoye Rural Settlement of Gagarinsky District in Smolensk Oblast, before February 2009
- Sloboda, name of Przhevalskoye, a selo in Slobodskoy and Demidovsky Districts of Smolensk Oblast, before 1964.

== Alternative names ==
- Sloboda, alternative name of Sloboda-Seletskaya, a village under the administrative jurisdiction of Unecha Urban Administrative Okrug in Unechsky District of Bryansk Oblast; 52°49′N 32°47′E
- Sloboda, alternative name of Novaya Sloboda, a selo in Novoslobodsky Selsoviet of Bolsheboldinsky District in Nizhny Novgorod Oblast; 54°56′N 45°9′E
- Sloboda, alternative name of Slobodka, a village in Dubrovsky Selsoviet of Dolzhansky District in Oryol Oblast; 52°10′N 37°21′E
- Sloboda, alternative name of Slobodka, a village in Pennovsky Selsoviet of Trosnyansky District in Oryol Oblast; 52°16′N 35°39′E
