= Sloboda (disambiguation) =

Sloboda was a type of settlement in Belarus, Russia, Ukraine and other Slavic states.

Sloboda may also refer to:

- Sloboda (surname), a Slovak surname (includes a list of people with the name)
- Sloboda (defense company), a Serbian defense manufacturing company based in Čačak
- Sloboda (confectionery company), a Croatian company based in Osijek, now better known as Karolina
- Sloboda (rural locality), name of several rural localities in Russia
- Słoboda, Podlaskie Voivodeship, Poland
- Słoboda, Podkarpackie Voivodeship, Poland
- FK Sloboda Čačak, Serbia
- FK Sloboda Mrkonjić Grad, Bosnia and Herzegovina
- FK Sloboda Novi Grad, Bosnia and Herzegovina
- FK Sloboda Tuzla, Bosnia and Herzegovina
- FK Sloboda Užice, Serbia

== See also ==
- Slabada
- Slobozia (disambiguation)
- Slobodskoy (disambiguation)
- Svoboda (disambiguation), cognate spelling
- Sloboda Ukraine, a historical region of Ukraine
- Sloboda-Komarivtsi, Ukraine
