= Svoboda (surname) =

Svoboda is a common Czech surname. Svobodová is a feminine form of the surname. For more than century it is one of the three most common Czech surnames.

== Etymology ==
The primary meaning of the word is 'freedom' or 'liberty' in Czech. As a surname, it used to refer to "free men" (to distinguish them from "serfs"). In the old Czech orthography the word was written as Swoboda and this spelling is still preserved in countries where the letter "w" is common, such as Poland or German-speaking countries. The Slovak, Croatian and Serbian version is written as "Sloboda".

== People named Svoboda ==
- Adam Svoboda (1978–2019), Czech ice hockey goaltender
- Alena Svobodová (born 1957), Czech rower
- Antonin Svoboda (disambiguation), multiple people
- Bill Svoboda (1928–1980), American football linebacker
- Bohuslav Svoboda (born 1944), Czech politician, mayor of Prague
- Cyril Svoboda (born 1956), former Deputy Prime Minister of the Czech Republic
- David Svoboda (born 1985), Czech modern pentathlete
- Drew Svoboda, American football coach
- Evan Svoboda, American football player
- František Svoboda (1906–1948), Czech football player
- František Svoboda (canoeist) (1904–1991), Czechoslovak canoeist
- Gabriela Svobodová (born 1953), former Czech cross country skier
- Hana Svobodová (born 1988), Czech beauty competition winner
- Irena Svobodová (born 1953), Czech volleyball player
- Jakub Svoboda (born 1989), Czech ice hockey player
- Jaroslav Svoboda (born 1980), Czech ice hockey right winger
- Jim Svoboda (born 1960), American football coach
- Jiří Svoboda (canoeist) (born 1954), Czechoslovak sprint canoeist
- Jiří Svoboda (volleyball) (born 1941), Czech former volleyball player
- Jiřina Ptáčníková Svobodová (born 1986), Czech female pole vaulter, wife of the Czech hurdler Petr Svoboda
- Jindřich Svoboda (footballer) (born 1952), Czech football player
- Jindřich Svoboda (aviator) (1917–1942), Czech bomber captain in the RAF
- Josef Svoboda (1920–2002), Czech artist and scenic designer
- Karel Svoboda (disambiguation), multiple people
- Karl Svoboda (rugby union) (born 1962), Canadian former rugby union player
- Karl Svoboda (politician) (1929–2022), Austrian politician
- Kathy Svoboda, American biologist
- Květoslav Svoboda (born 1982), Czech freestyle swimmer
- Ludvík Svoboda (1895–1979), Czechoslovak general and politician
- Martin Svoboda (footballer) (born 1975), Czech football goalkeeper
- Martin Svoboda (rowing) (born 1975), Czech rowing coxswain
- Michael Svoboda (born 1998), Austrian footballer
- Milan Svoboda (1939–2004), Czechoslovak slalom canoeist
- Miroslav Svoboda (disambiguation), multiple people
- Oldřich Svoboda (born 1967), Czech ice hockey goalkeeper
- Patrik Svoboda (born 1994), Czech football player
- Pavel Svoboda (born 1962), Czech politician and lawyer
- Pavel Svoboda (organist) (born 1987), Czech Organist
- Petr Svoboda (born 1966), retired Czech professional ice hockey defenseman
- Petr Svoboda (athlete) (born 1984), Czech athlete, competing in the hurdle sprint
- Petr Svoboda (ice hockey b. 1980) (born 1980), former professional ice hockey defenceman
- Radoslav Svoboda (born 1957), Czech ice hockey player
- Růžena Svobodová (1868–1920), Czech writer
- Stanislav Svoboda (cyclist) (1930–1967), Czech cyclist
- Stanislav Svoboda (speedway rider) (1919–1992), Czechoslovak speedway rider
- Svatopluk Svoboda (1886–1971), Czech gymnast
- Terese Svoboda, American author from New York City
- Tomáš Svoboda (disambiguation), multiple people
- Vaclav Svoboda, pseudonym of Jindřich Marco (1921–2000), Czechoslovak photographer
- Zdeněk Svoboda (born 1972), former professional footballer

== See also ==
- Swoboda (disambiguation) for the Polish spelling
- Sloboda (disambiguation) for the Serbo-Croatian and Macedonian spelling
- List of most common surnames in the Czech Republic
