= Przhevalsky (inhabited locality) =

Przhevalsky (Russian: Пржева́льский; masculine), Przhevalskaya (Пржева́льская; feminine), or Przhevalskoye (Пржева́льское; neuter) is the name of several inhabited localities in Russia:

- Przhevalskoye, an urban locality (a resort settlement) in Demidovsky District of Smolensk Oblast
- Przhevalskaya, a rural locality (a railway station) in Pogranichny District of Primorsky Krai
