= Svoboda =

Svoboda (Cyrillic: свобода) means "freedom" in various Slavic languages. It may refer to:

== People ==
- Svoboda (surname)

== Organizations ==
=== Media ===
- Radio Svoboda, operated by Radio Free Europe/Radio Liberty
- Svoboda (newspaper), a daily Ukrainian language newspaper published in New Jersey by Ukrainian National Association

=== Politics ===
- Svoboda (political party) (All-Ukrainian Union "Svoboda"), a far right, conservative and ultranationalist political party in Ukraine
- Freedom Movement (Slovenia)

=== Sports ===
- NK Svoboda (disambiguation)

== Places ==
- Svoboda Factory Club, memorial building in Moscow
- Svoboda, Pazardzhik Province, a village in Bulgaria
- Svoboda nad Úpou, a town in the Czech Republic
- Svoboda, a former name of the Russian town of Liski, Voronezh Oblast

== Other uses ==
- 2559 Svoboda, asteroid
- Svoboda, a lighting device designed by Josef Svoboda
- Svoboda 1945: Liberation, a Czech point-and-click adventure game.

== See also ==
- Swoboda (disambiguation) for the Polish spelling
- Sloboda (disambiguation) for the Slovak, Serbo-Croatian and Macedonian spelling
