= FK Sloboda =

FK Sloboda may refer to the following football clubs:

- FK Sloboda Čačak, Serbia
- FK Sloboda Mrkonjić Grad, Bosnia and Herzegovina
- FK Sloboda Novi Grad, Bosnia and Herzegovina
- FK Sloboda Tuzla, Bosnia and Herzegovina
- FK Sloboda Užice, Serbia

== See also ==
- Sloboda (disambiguation)
- NK Svoboda (disambiguation)
