= Lake Sapsho =

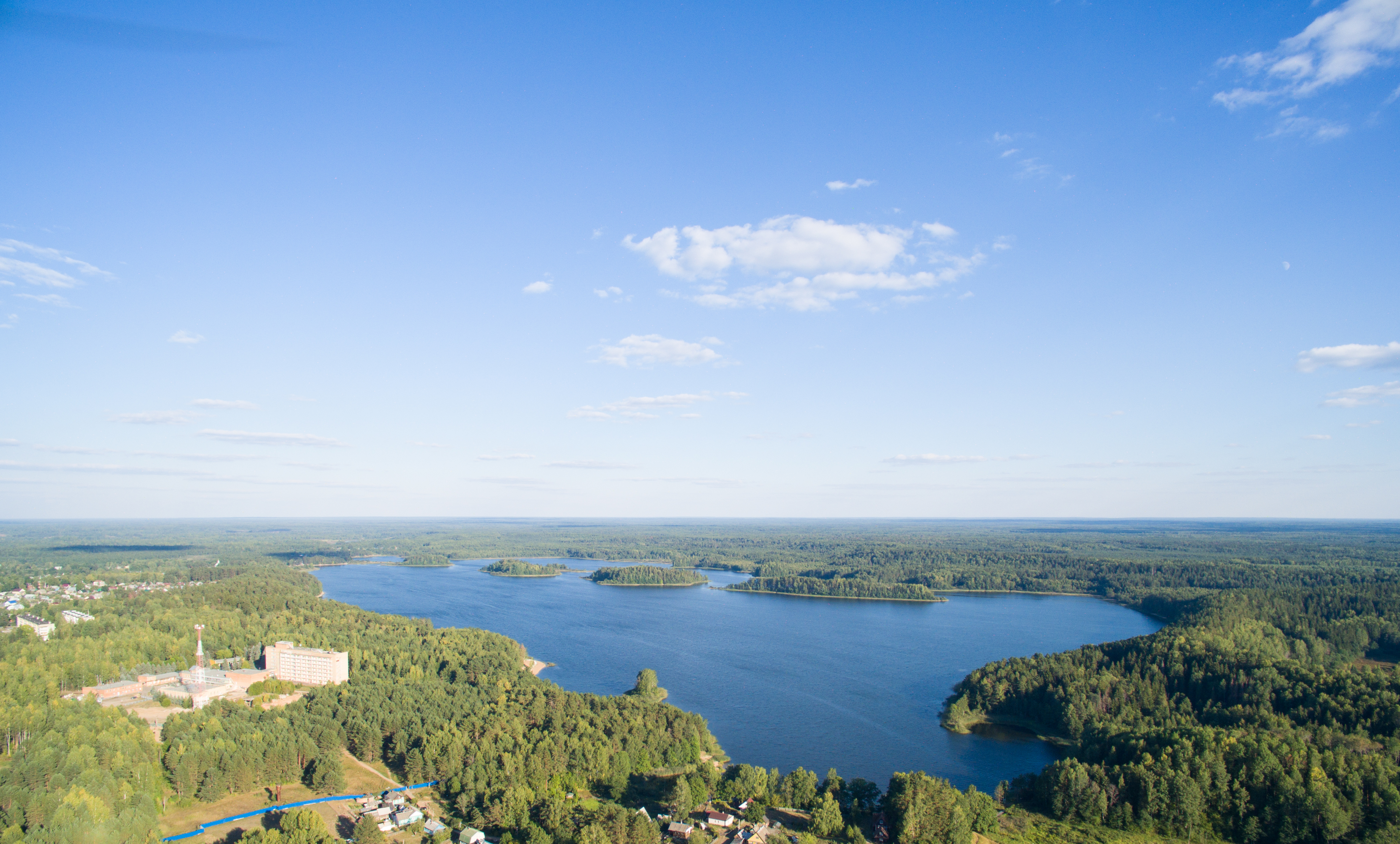

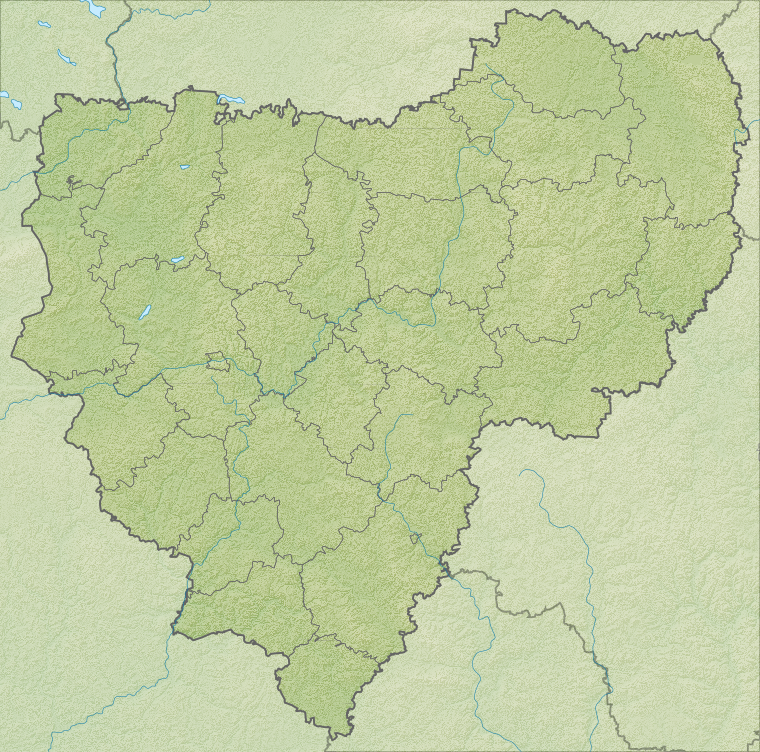
- Location within Smolensk Oblast
- Location: Smolensk Oblast, Russia
- Coordinates: 55°29′44″N 31°50′43″E
- Lake type: Glacial lake
- Primary inflows: Sapsha, Sapshanka
- Primary outflows: Sapsha
- Basin countries: Russia
- Surface area: 3.04 km^{2} (1.17 sq mi)
- Average depth: 6.9 m (23 ft)
- Max. depth: 18.6 m (61 ft)
- Water volume: 0.021 km^{3} (0.005 cu mi)
- Shore length^{1}: 7.8 km (4.85 mi)
- Surface elevation: 172.7 m (567 ft)
- Frozen: November–April
- Islands: 6
- Settlements: Przhevalskoye
- ^{1} Shore length is not a well-defined measure.

Lake Sapsho (Russian: Сапшо́) is a glacial lake in Demidovsky District of Smolensk Oblast, Russia. It is the largest lake (3,04 km^{2}) of the Smolenskoye Poozerye National Park. It is situated northeast of Demidov in the northwestern part of the oblast, near the settlement of Przhevalskoye. Famous 19th century Russian traveller Nikolay Przhevalsky compared the lake with Lake Baikal in miniature. The lake is a natural monument. It is connected with the Baltic Sea by the Sapsha, Vasilyevka, Yelsha, and Daugava rivers. There are 4 big and 2 small islands on the lake. There are a lot of tumuli of the Tushumlin culture by Lake Sapsho. The flora and fauna of the lake are very diverse. Yet in the beginning of the 20th century there was the industrial fishery. Though now any industry is prohibited here. A lot of species of the flora and fauna of the lake are in the Red Book.

== Geography and hydrography ==
=== The Lake ===
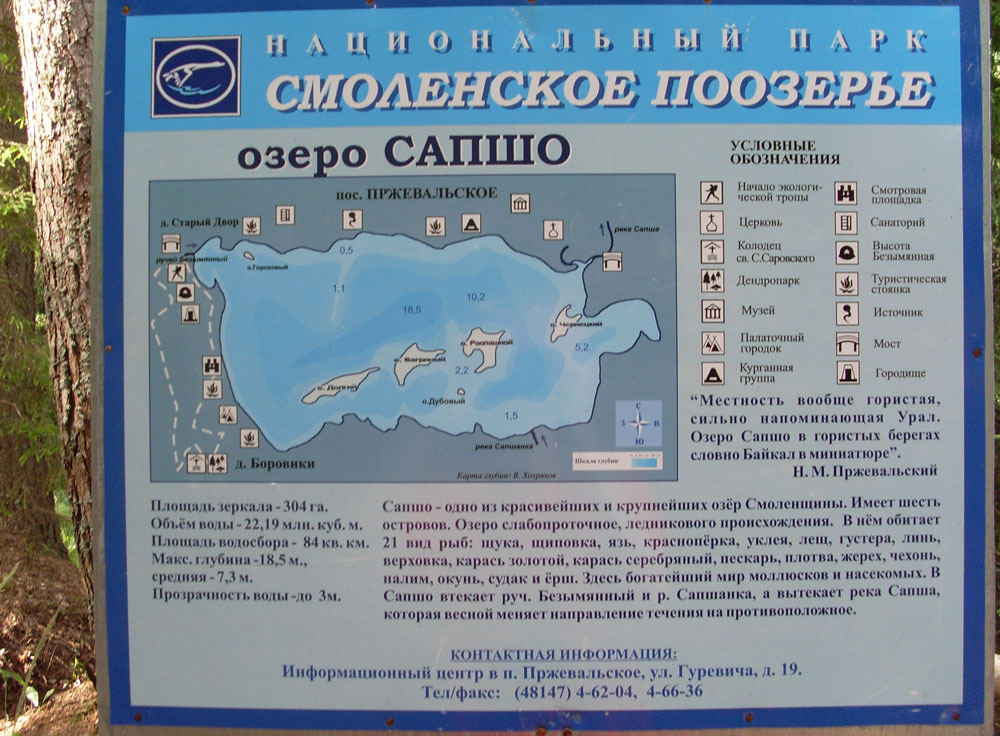
The bottom of Lake Sapsho

Lake Sapsho is situated in the north-west of Smolensk Oblast, 120 km (75 mi) to the north of Smolensk. It is on the Sloboda Upland (Russian: Слободская возвышенность) that is a part of Smolensk–Moscow Upland (Russian: Смоленско-Московская возвышенность). It is the largest lake in Smolenskoye Poozerye National Park. There are two eskers. One of them is partly destroyed by glacial flows. It caused the arising of five of six islands. Lake Sapsho is divided into deep northern and shallow southern parts. The other esker forms the western border of the lake. The northern side is also abrupt. On the contrary, the eastern and southern sides are gentle. The bottom of the lake here is also not steep. The northern basin is divided into western and eastern parts by a long underwater spit. The depth here is less than 5 m (16 ft). It ends with a long shoal with depth less than 1 m (3 ft 3 in), a so-called "underwater island" or "sitnik".

Lake Sapsho drains into the rivers of the Western Dvina (Russian: Западная Двина) basin. In spring, usually by the middle or end of April, water volume increases because of melting snow. The melting of ice on the lake usually takes from 10 to 15 days more, and ends in the late April or early May. The swimming season opens in late June or early July, and finishes in late July or early August. The lake usually covers with ice in the 2nd or 3rd decade of November. Sometimes, it happens in the middle of December. The thickness of ice is from 50 cm (20 in) to 70 cm (28 in). In most severe winters it may become up to 90 cm (35 in). The period of freeze-up is from 150 to 170 days.

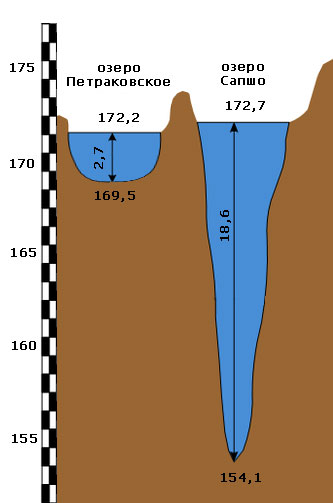
Surface elevation of Lake Petrakovskoye and Lake Sapsho

=== The Rivers ===
Inflow rivers are the Sapshanka (Russian: Сапшанка) in the south and the Sapsha (Russian: Сапша) in the west. The outflow river is the Sapsha in the east. The Sapsha connects Lake Sapsho and Lake Petrakovskoye (Russian: Петраковское). Both lakes have similar surface elevation. The area of Lake Petrakovskoye is 0.17 km^{2} (0.066 sq mi). During the period of melting snow in spring and heavy showers in summer Lake Petrakovskoye fills with water faster than Lake Sapsho. Therefore, the Sapsha changes its flow. Usually changing of flow of the Sapsha happens several times a year.

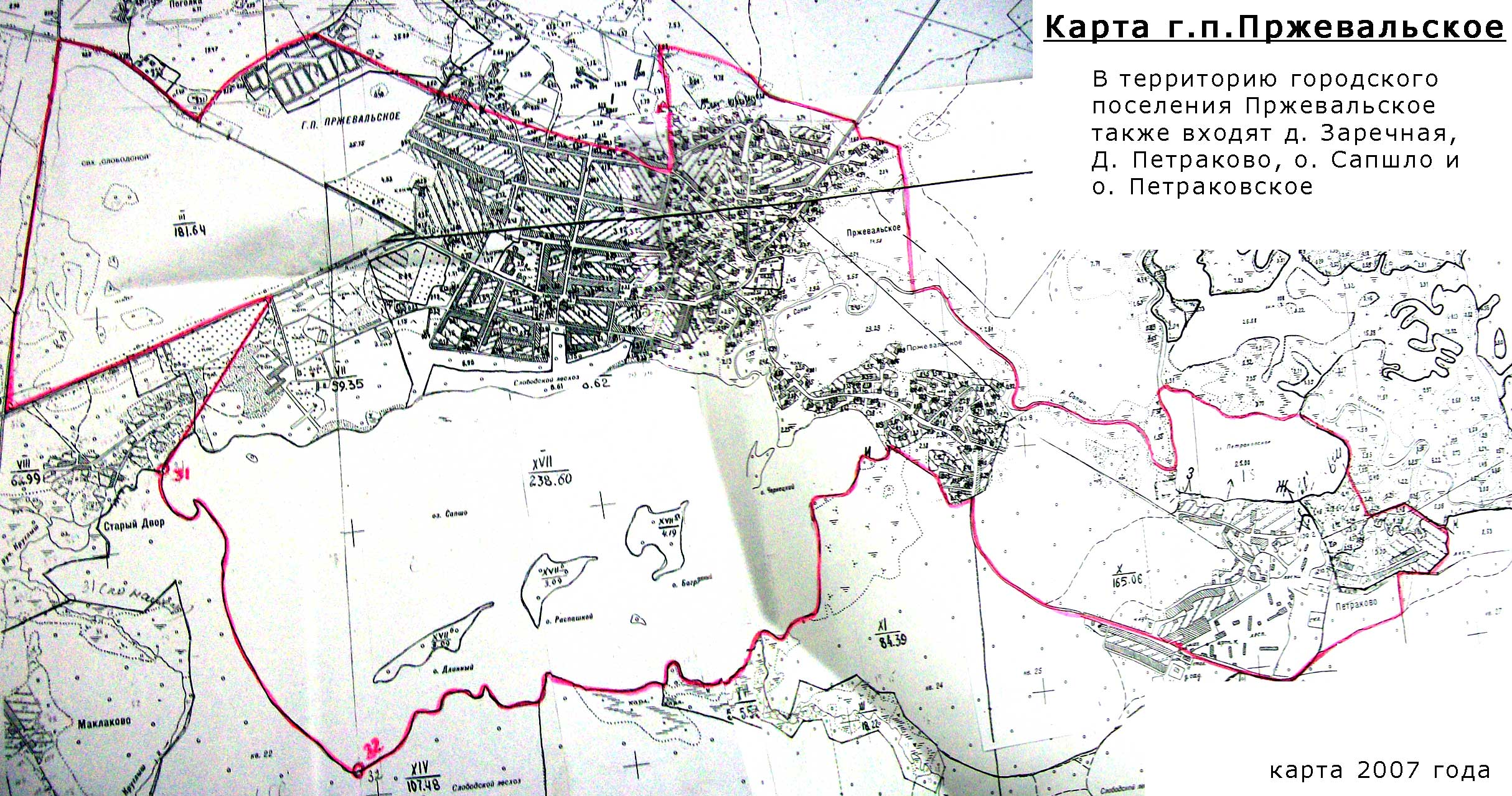
Lake Sapsho and Lake Petrakovskoye on the map of Przhevalskoye

=== The Islands ===
There 6 islands on the lake. Four of them are large: Chernetsky / Monk Island (Russian: Чернецкий), Raspashnoy / Border Island (Russian: Распашной), Bagryany / Crimson Island (Russian: Багряный), Dlinny / Long Island (Russian: Длинный). Two of them are small: Dubovy / Oak Island (Russian: Дубовый) and Lyubvi / Island of Love (Russian: Любви). Five of them are located in line along one of two eskers.

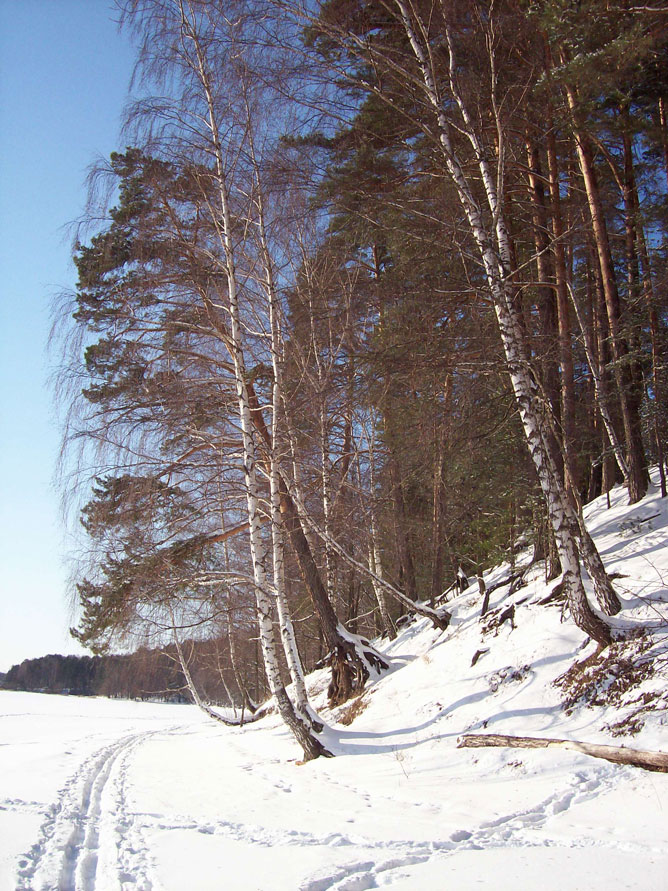
At Lake Sapsho in winter
