= Słoboda, Podlaskie Voivodeship =

Słoboda
- Village
- Location within Poland
- Coordinates: 53°56′06″N 22°49′40″E
- Country: Poland
- Voivodeship: Podlaskie
- County: Suwałki
- Gmina: Raczki

Słoboda [swɔˈbɔda] is a village in the administrative district of Gmina Raczki, within Suwałki County, Podlaskie Voivodeship, in north-eastern Poland.

== See also ==
- Sloboda
- Słoboda, Subcarpathian Voivodeship
