= Swoboda (surname) =

Swoboda is a surname of Czech origin. A variant of Svoboda, it is popular mainly among West Slavic nations. In Czech, the word's primary meaning is 'freedom' or 'liberty'. As a surname, it used to refer to "free men" (to distinguish them from "serfs").

Due to modern Czech orthography, the most common form in the Czech Republic is Svoboda. In the old Czech orthography the name was written Swoboda and this spelling is still preserved in countries where the letter "w" is common, such as Poland or German-speaking countries. Its Slovak version is Sloboda.

== Notable people with the name ==
- Albin Swoboda (disambiguation), multiple individuals
- Alois P. Swoboda (1873–1938), American fitness writer
- Brigitte Swoboda (1943–2019), Austrian actor
- Eduard Swoboda (1814–1902), Austrian painter
- Erich Swoboda (1896–1964), Austrian archaeologist
- Ewa Swoboda (born 1997), Polish track athlete
- Franz Swoboda (1933–2017), Austrian footballer
- Franz Swoboda (gymnast) (1909–unknown), Austrian gymnast
- Hannes Swoboda (born 1946), Austrian politician
- Henry Swoboda (1897–1990), Czech musicologist
- Josefine Swoboda (1861–1924), Austrian portrait painter
- Joseph Wilhelm Swoboda (1806–1882), Czech opera singer
- Kai Swoboda (born 1971), Australian slalom canoeist
- Lary J. Swoboda (1939–2012), American politician
- Markus Swoboda (born 1990), Austrian paracanoeist
- Mike Swoboda (1938–2008), American politician
- Robin Swoboda (born 1958), American news anchor
- Ron Swoboda (born 1944), American baseball player
- Rudolf Swoboda (1859–1914), Austrian Orientalist painter
- Rudolf Swoboda the Elder (1819–1859), Austrian landscape painter

== Fictional characters ==
- Larry Swoboda, the defense attorney in John Grisham's novel, Witness to a Trial: A Short Story Prequel to The Whistler (2016)
- Wade Swoboda, name of actor Casey Saunder's character in the 1990s TV comedy series Grace Under Fire.
