= Kasplya =

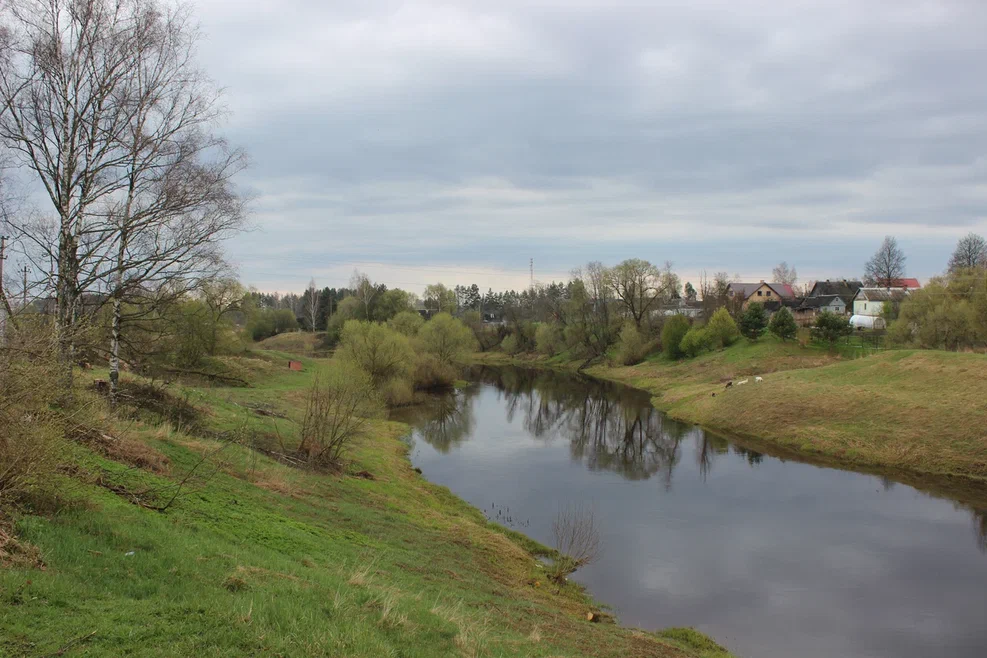
- Native name: Каспля (Russian)

Location
- Country: Russia, Belarus

Physical characteristics
- Source
  - coordinates: 54°59′N 31°38′E
- Mouth: Daugava (Western Dvina)
  - coordinates: 55.4086°N 30.7187°E
- Length: 136 km (85 mi)
- Basin size: 5,410 km^{2} (2,090 sq mi)
- Discharge
  - average: 36.9 m^{3}/s (1,300 cu ft/s)

Basin features
- Progression: Daugava→ Baltic Sea

The Kasplya (Belarusian and Russian: Каспля) is a river in Smolensky, Demidovsky, and Rudnyansky Districts of Smolensk Oblast of Russia and in Vitebsk Region of northern Belarus. It is a major left-bank tributary of the Daugava. Of its total length of 136 kilometres (85 mi), the first 116 kilometres (72 mi) are in Russia, and the rest in Belarus. It joins the Daugava in the urban-type settlement of Surazh. The town of Demidov is situated on the Kasplya.

The Kasplya originates from Lake Kasplya in Smolensky District. It flows north, crosses the border with Demidovsky District and turns northwest. It flows through Demidov, and next to the selo of Boroda turns west, crosses Rudnyansky District and enters Belarus. There, it turns northwest again and enters the Daugava.

During the Viking Age, the river was an important part of the Dnieper trade route, as there was a portage from the Kasplya to the Dnieper tributaries entering the Dnieper near Gnezdovo.
