= Slobozia (disambiguation) =

Map of places named Slobozia

Slobozia is a city in Ialomița County, Romania.

Slobozia may also refer to:

- Slobozia, Argeș, a commune in Argeș County, Romania
- Slobozia, Giurgiu, a commune in Giurgiu County, Romania
- Slobozia, a village in Popești Commune, Argeș County, Romania
- Slobozia, a village in Stoenești Commune, Argeș County, Romania
- Slobozia, a village in Filipeni Commune, Bacău County, Romania
- Slobozia, a village in Stănișești Commune, Bacău County, Romania
- Slobozia, a village in Urecheşti Commune, Bacău County, Romania
- Slobozia, a village in Broscăuți Commune, Botoșani County, Romania
- Slobozia, a village in Cordăreni Commune, Botoșani County, Romania
- Slobozia, a village in Hănești Commune, Botoșani County, Romania
- Slobozia, a village in Păltiniș Commune, Botoşani County, Romania
- Slobozia, a village in Cătina Commune, Buzău County, Romania
- Slobozia, a village in Cornățelu Commune, Dâmbovița County, Romania
- Slobozia, a village in Ciurea Commune, Iași County, Romania
- Slobozia, a village in Deleni Commune, Iași County, Romania
- Slobozia, a village in Schitu Duca Commune, Iași County, Romania
- Slobozia, a village in Sirețel Commune, Iași County, Romania
- Slobozia, a village in Voinești Commune, Iași County, Romania
- Slobozia, a village in Boghicea Commune, Neamț County, Romania
- Slobozia, a village in Fântânele Commune, Suceava County, Romania
- Slobozia, a village in Zvoriștea Commune, Suceava County, Romania
- Slobozia, a village in Gârceni Commune, Vaslui County, Romania
- Slobozia, a district in the municipality of Onești, Bacău County, Romania
- Slobozia, a district in the municipality of Târgu Jiu, Gorj County, Romania
- Slobozia, a district in the town of Roznov, Neamț County, Romania
- Slobozia, Moldova, a city in Transnistria, Moldova
  - Slobozia District, the surrounding area
- Slobozia, Ștefan Vodă, a commune in Ștefan Vodă district, Moldova
- Slobozia, Bălți, a former commune now part of the city of Bălți, Moldova
- Slobozia Bradului, a commune in Vrancea County, Romania
- Slobozia Ciorăști, a commune in Vrancea County, Romania
- Slobozia Conachi, a commune in Galați County, Romania
- Slobozia-Dușca, a commune in Criuleni District, Moldova
- Slobozia Mare, a commune in Cahul District, Moldova
- Slobozia Mândra, a commune in Teleorman County, Romania
- Slobozia Moară, a commune in Dâmbovița County, Romania
- Slobozia Nouă, several places
- Slobozia-Rașcov, a commune in Camenca District, Transnistria, Moldova
- Slobozia-Șirăuți, a commune in Briceni District, Moldova
- Slobozia Blăneasa, a village in Negrilești, Galați, Romania
- Slobozia Botești, a village in Măicănești Commune, Vrancea County, Romania
- Slobozia-Chișcăreni, a village in Chișcăreni Commune, Sîngerei District, Moldova
- Slobozia Corni, a village in Ghidigeni Commune, Galați County, Romania
- Slobozia-Cremene and Slobozia-Vărăncău, villages in Vărăncău, Soroca, Moldova
- Slobozia Hănești, a village in Hănești Commune, Botoșani County, Romania
- Slobozia-Hodorogea, a village in Biești Commune, Orhei District, Moldova
- Slobozia-Horodiște, a village in Horodiște, Rezina, Moldova
- Slobozia-Măgura, a village in Bursuceni Commune, Sîngerei District, Moldova
- Slobozia-Medveja, a village in Medveja, Briceni, Moldova
- Slobozia Oancea, a village in Oancea Commune, Galați County, Romania
- Slobozia-Recea, a village in Recea, Rîșcani, Moldova
- Slobozia Silișcani, a village in Mihălășeni, Botoșani, Romania
- Slobozia Sucevei, a village in Grănicești Commune, Suceava County, Romania
- Slobozia Bănilei, the Romanian name for Sloboda-Banyliv, Chernivtsi Oblast, Ukraine
- Slobozia Comăreștilor, the Romanian name for Sloboda-Komarivtsi, Chernivtsi Oblast, Ukraine
- Slobozia-Mihălceni, the former name of Mihălceni village, Ciorăști Commune, Vrancea County, Romania
- Slobozia Rarancei, the Romanian name for Sloboda, Chernivtsi Oblast, Ukraine
