= Antonin Svoboda =

Antonin Svoboda or Antonín Svoboda may refer to:

- Antonín Svoboda (athlete) (1900–1965), Czech Olympics sprinter
- Antonín Svoboda (computer scientist) (1907–1980), Czech computer scientist
- Antonin Svoboda (director), film director, director of The Strange Case of Wilhelm Reich (2012)
- Antonín Svoboda (footballer) (born 2002), Czech football player

== See also ==
- Svoboda (surname)
- Antonin (name)
