= Smolenskoye Poozerye National Park =

National park in Russia

- Смоленское Поозерье (Russian)
- IUCN category II (national park)
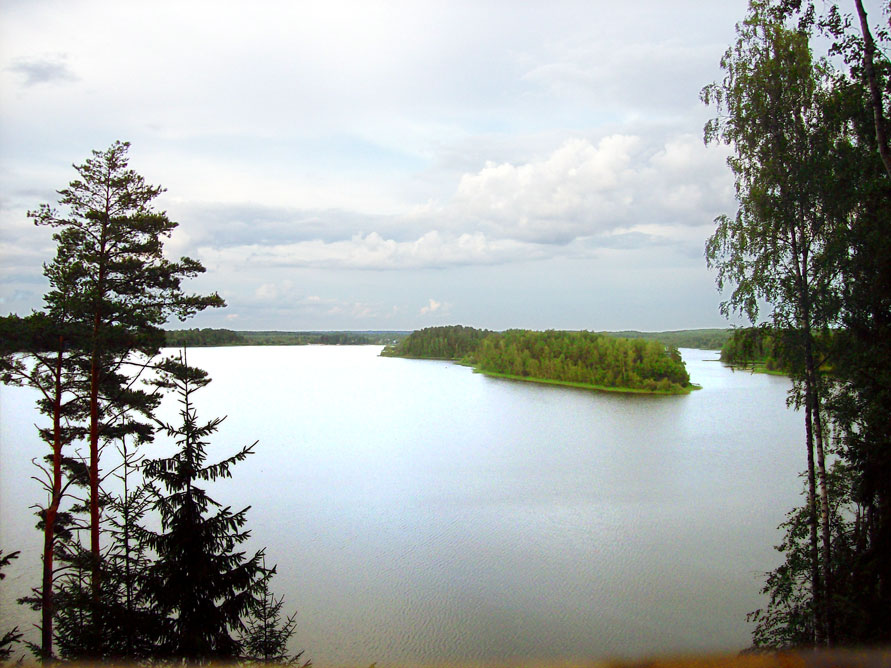
- Islands in Lake Sapsho

- Location within Russia
- Location: Smolensk Oblast
- Nearest city: Smolensk
- Coordinates: 55°32′N 31°24′E
- Area: 146,237 hectares (361,359 acres; 1,462 km^{2}; 565 sq mi)
- Established: 1992
- Visitors: 250,000(Park administration)
- Governing body: FGBU "Smolenskoye Poozrye"
- Website: http://www.poozerie.ru/en/home/

Smolenskoye Poozerye, Smolensk Oblast, Russia

Climate chart (precipitation, max. and min. temperature)
J	F	M	A	M	J	J	A	S	O	N	D
1.3 23 12	1.2 24 12	1.4 33 20	1.5 50 34	1.9 64 44	3 70 51	3.5 73 55	3.1 71 53	2.4 61 44	1.8 48 36	1.8 35 27	1.7 27 18
- █ Average max. and min. temperatures in °F
- █ Precipitation totals in inches
- Source: [http://www.globalspecies.org/weather_stations/climate/424/291
Metric conversion
J	F	M	A	M	J	J	A	S	O	N	D
33 −5 −11	30 −4 −11	36 1 −7	38 10 1	48 18 7	76 21 11	89 23 13	79 22 11	61 16 7	46 9 2	46 2 −3	43 −3 −8
- █ Average max. and min. temperatures in °C
- █ Precipitation totals in mm

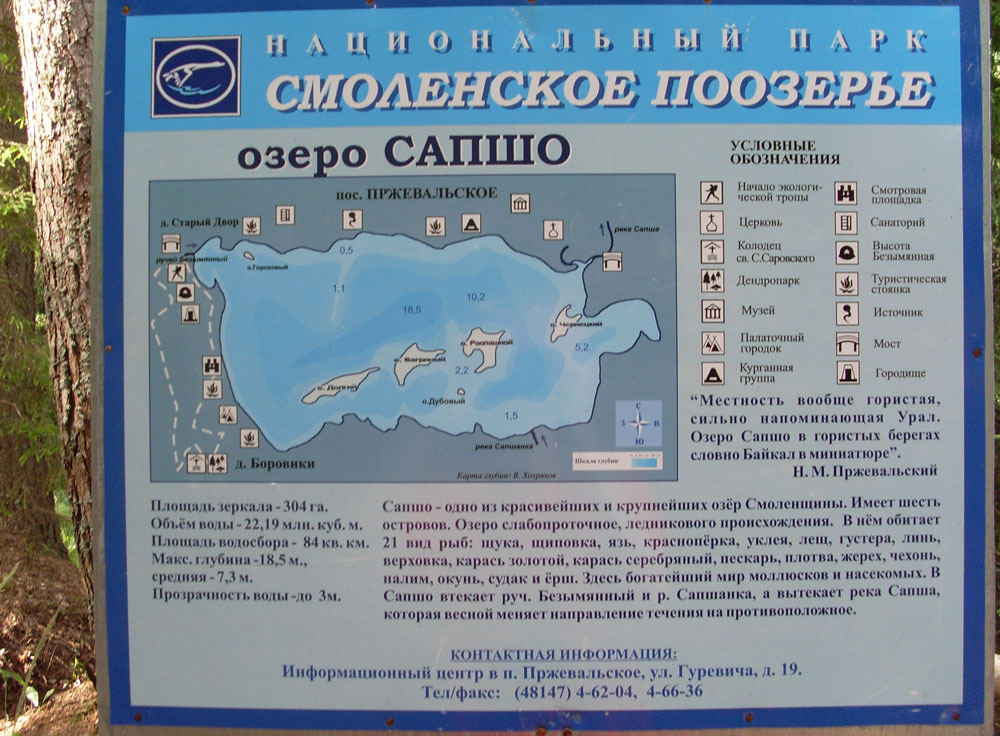
Recreation map of Lake Sapsho

Smolenskoye Poozerye National Park (Russian: Смоленское Поозерье, which translates as Smolensk Lakes) is a forest-wetland ecosystem of 35 lakes and surroundings in the northwest of Smolensk Oblast near the Russian border with Belarus, about 40 miles (64 km) north of the city of Smolensk. The Western Dvina River flows through the lake region. The park was officially established in 1992. Since 2002, the park has been included in the international network of biosphere reserves. Administratively, the national park is shared between Demidovsky and Dukhovshchinsky Districts of Smolensk Oblast.

== Topography ==
The park covers a region 55 kilometres (34 mi) (east-west) by 50 kilometres (31 mi) (north-south) over a flat network of low-lying rivers and lakes. The highest elevation is 248 metres (814 ft), the lowest is 167 metres (548 ft). The underlying landforms include gravel moraines and ridges, and flat floodplains. The two main rivers are the Yelsha and the Polovya. The largest lake is Lake Sapsho (3 km2), a glacial lake and major tourist draw to its resort town of Przhevalskoye. Areas of coverage have been estimated as 107,563 hectares (265,794 acres) of forest (about 75%), 16,240 hectares (40,130 acres) of bogs, 1,608 hectares (3,973 acres) of lakes, and 468 hectares (1,156 acres) of rivers.

== Climate and ecoregion ==
Smolenskoye Poozerye is towards the eastern end of the Sarmatic mixed forests ecoregion (WWF ID#436), which runs from southern Sweden across the Baltic states and central eastern Europe (including Moscow) to the Ural Mountains. The ecoregion is a strip of low forests, lakes and wetlands, running from the Baltic Sea east to the Urals. Forest cover is typically mixed conifer and deciduous trees, with the unbroken tracts under pressure from agriculture.

For aquatic habitat, the park is in the "Volga-Ural" freshwater ecoregion (WWF ID#410), a region that is characterized in general by a high number fish species but relatively few endemics.

The climate of Smolenskoye Poozerye is Humid continental climate, warm summer (Köppen climate classification (Dfb)). This climate is characterized by large swings in temperature, both diurnally and seasonally, with mild summers and cold, snowy winters. Days can be clear in winter when polar air masses are present, and in summer there are occasional thunderstorms. Average temperatures range from 17 F in January to +64 F in July. Annual precipitation averages 24.6 inches (62 cm).

== Plants ==
The park is designed to cover many different habits in a small, contiguous place. These habitats include pine forests, spruce forests, broad-leaf forests, bogs, sedge meadows along the banks for rivers and lakes, dry meadows, and water habitat itself. A review of tree cover percentages reported spruce (16%), pine (12%), birch (38%), aspen (13%), and black alder (6%).

== Animals ==
A census of animals in the park recorded 54 mammal species, 232 bird species, and 37 species of fish. In 2012, the World Wildlife Fund initiated a project entitled "Conservation and restoration of rare bird species in large wetlands of Smolensk Lakeland National Park".

== History ==
The territory of the Smolensk Lakes has been inhabited since ancient times, and archaeological remains are found throughout the park. The earliest flint tools date to the Mesolithic Age (7,000-8,000 BCE), there are 17 known Neolithic sites, and about 25 Bronze Age memorials. Since the fifth century AD, the culture of the area has been Slavic agricultural and timber-related. In modern times, 123 villages have been recorded in the region. The park includes a resort town, Przhevalskoye, on the shores of Lake Sapsho.

== Tourism ==
The park is developed with recreational facilities, including a popular spa "Holy Well", and an ancient settlement Verzhavska. Nature trails, bike trails, horse trials, and water tourist routes are maintained. There is a trail for children called "Fairy tales of a Russian forest", which features defense outposts and homes of folklore characters 'Baba-Yaga' and 'Leshy'. There are guided tours for bird-watching, historical-cultural site visits, and scientific education. The park administers 32 tourist shelters, and 30 guest houses. The park's administration estimates that there are 230,000-250,000 visitors per year, most of whom are local.

== See also ==
- Protected areas of Russia
