= Swoboda =

Swoboda may refer to:

- Swoboda (surname)

== Places ==
- Swoboda, Chodzież County, in Greater Poland Voivodeship (west-central Poland)
- Swoboda, Gostynin County, in Masovian Voivodeship (east-central Poland)
- Swoboda, Kalisz County, in Greater Poland Voivodeship (west-central Poland)
- Swoboda, Lublin Voivodeship, in east Poland
- Swoboda, Mińsk County, in Masovian Voivodeship (east-central Poland)
- Swoboda, Wieruszów County, in Łódź Voivodeship (central Poland)
- Swoboda, Zgierz County, in Łódź Voivodeship (central Poland)

== See also ==
- Svoboda (disambiguation)
