= Sloboda, Republic of Buryatia =

Sloboda Слобода
- Selo
- Location within Republic of Buryatia Location within Russia
- Coordinates: 50°36′N 107°54′E
- Country: Russia
- Region: Republic of Buryatia
- District: Bichursky District
- Time zone: UTC+8:00

Sloboda (Russian: Слобода) is a rural locality (a selo) in Bichursky District, Republic of Buryatia, Russia. The population was 556 as of 2010. There are 5 streets.

== Geography ==
Sloboda is located 27 km east of Bichura (the district's administrative centre) by road. Poselye is the nearest rural locality.
