= Sloboda, Vladimir Oblast =

Sloboda Слобода
- Village
- Location within Vladimir Oblast Location within Russia
- Coordinates: 56°18′N 39°31′E
- Country: Russia
- Region: Vladimir Oblast
- District: Kolchuginsky District
- Time zone: UTC+3:00

Sloboda (Russian: Слобода) is a rural locality (a village) in Yesiplevskoye Rural Settlement, Kolchuginsky District, Vladimir Oblast, Russia. The population was 5 as of 2010.

== Geography ==
Sloboda is located on the Ilmovka River, 16 km east of Kolchugino (the district's administrative centre) by road. Shkolny is the nearest rural locality.
