= Przhevalskoye =

Przhevalskoye Пржевальское
- Settlement
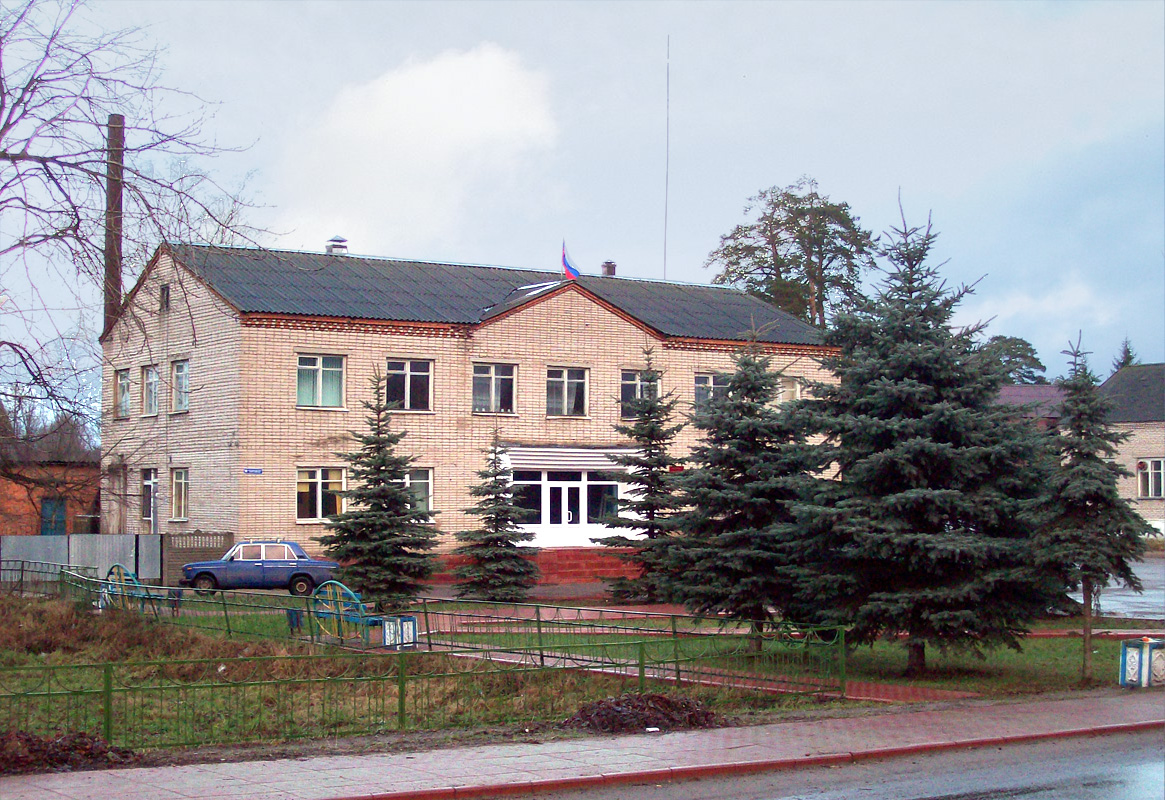
- Administration building in Przhevalskoye
- Interactive map of Przhevalskoye
- Location of Przhevalskoye Przhevalskoye (Smolensk Oblast)
- Coordinates: 55°31′N 31°52′E
- Country: Russia
- Federal subject: Smolensk Oblast
- Administrative district: Demidovsky District
- Urban settlementSelsoviet: Przhevalskoye
- Urban-type settlement status since: 1974

Area
  - Total: 11.25 km^{2} (4.34 sq mi)

Population (2010 Census)
  - Total: 1,683
  - Estimate (2024): 1,195 (−29%)
  - Density: 149.6/km^{2} (387.5/sq mi)

Administrative status
  - Capital of: Przhevalskoye Urban Settlement

Municipal status
  - Municipal district: Demidovsky Municipal District
  - Urban settlement: Przhevalskoye Urban Settlement
  - Capital of: Przhevalskoye Urban Settlement
- Time zone: UTC+3 (MSK)
- Postal code: 216270
- OKTMO ID: 66611153051

Przhevalskoye population
- 2010 Census: 1,683
- 2002 Census: 2,110
- 1989 Census: 2,883
- 1979 Census: 2,811

Przhevalskoye (Russian: Пржева́льское) is an urban locality (a settlement) in Demidovsky District of Smolensk Oblast, Russia, located in the northwestern part of the oblast, on Lake Sapsho, northeast of the town of Demidov, the administrative center of the district. It is a terminus of the Demidov-Przhevalskoye Highway. As of the 2010 Census, its population was 1,683.

The settlement is home to the Museum of Nikolay Przhevalsky, which occupies the mansion of the famous traveler. Previously called Sloboda (Слобода́), it was renamed after Przhevalsky in 1964.

== History ==
The village of Sloboda was first mentioned in 1724 in connection with the building of the church, although the place had been inhabited long before that. Archeologists found ceramic products of the 4th or 3rd millennium BCE. In the 4th-8th centuries, it was inhabited by the Krivichs. People also lived in these lands at later times. Along the rivers and lakes (including Lake Sapsho), there was the trade route from the Varangians to the Greeks, and not so far away there was the second big city of the Principality of Smolensk called Verzhavsk (Вержавск). In the 19th century, it was an outlying area with little economic activity. It was the reason why Nikolay Przhevalsky bought an estate here in 1881. In the middle of the 20th century, Przhevalskoye-Sloboda became famous during World War II for its partisan defenders. From September 1942 to September 1943, the front line ran through the village. Almost all buildings were burnt. The partisans' staff was located in the partly ruined church.

In the 19th century, Sloboda belonged to Porechsky Uyezd of Smolensk Governorate. In 1927, it was transferred to Yartsevsky Uyezd of the same governorate. On 12 July 1929, governorates and uyezds were abolished, and Slobodskoy District with the administrative center in Sloboda was established. The district belonged to Smolensk Okrug of Western Oblast. In 1930, the district was abolished and split between Demidovsky, Ilyinsky, Prechistensky, and Velizhsky Districts. In 1938, it was re-established. In 1960, Slobodskoy District was abolished and merged into Demidovsky District.

The settlement has been serving as a health resort since mineral waters were discovered in the 1970s, and a sanatorium (the largest in Smolensk Oblast was built in 1974.). Also in 1974, it was granted urban-type settlement status.

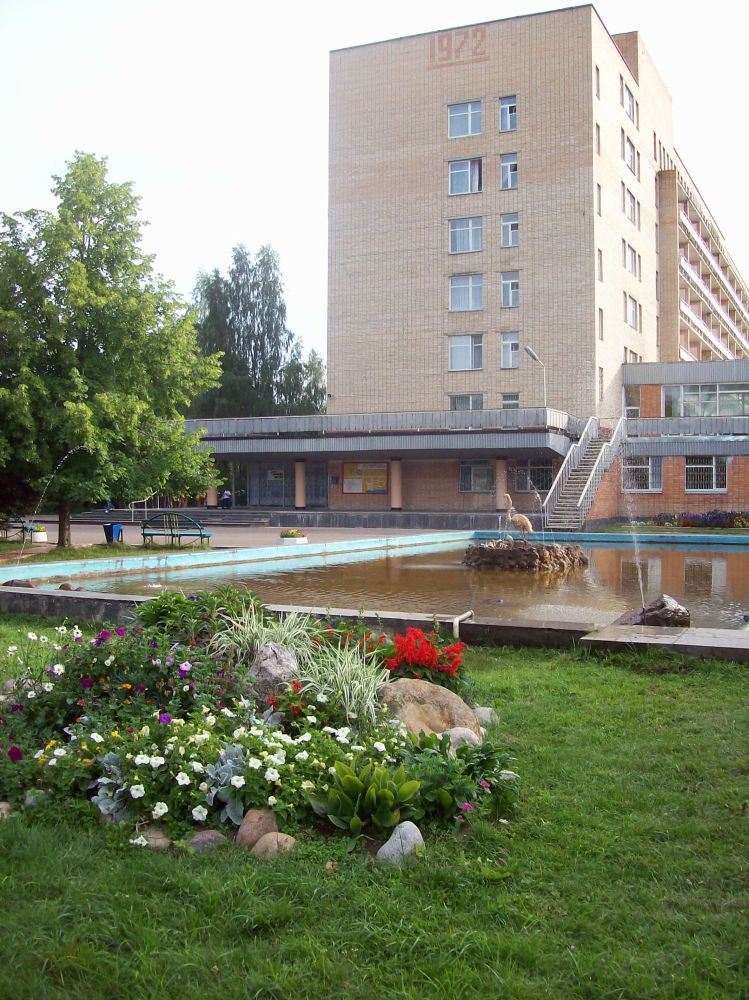
The sanatorium of Przhevalskoye

Przhevalskoye is also a part of Smolenskoye Poozerye National Park.

== Climate ==
Przhevalskoye has a warm-summer humid continental climate (Dfb in the Köppen climate classification).

Climate data for Przhevalskoye
Month	Jan	Feb	Mar	Apr	May	Jun	Jul	Aug	Sep	Oct	Nov	Dec	Year
Mean daily maximum °C (°F)	−4.3 (24.3)	−3.3 (26.1)	2.2 (36.0)	10.9 (51.6)	17 (63)	20.2 (68.4)	22.8 (73.0)	21.3 (70.3)	15.7 (60.3)	8.3 (46.9)	2.4 (36.3)	−1.6 (29.1)	9.3 (48.8)
Daily mean °C (°F)	−6.3 (20.7)	−5.9 (21.4)	−1.2 (29.8)	6.5 (43.7)	13 (55)	16.5 (61.7)	19.1 (66.4)	17.6 (63.7)	12.4 (54.3)	5.9 (42.6)	0.8 (33.4)	−3.3 (26.1)	6.3 (43.2)
Mean daily minimum °C (°F)	−8.6 (16.5)	−8.8 (16.2)	−4.8 (23.4)	1.7 (35.1)	8.1 (46.6)	12.1 (53.8)	14.9 (58.8)	13.8 (56.8)	9 (48)	3.6 (38.5)	−1 (30)	−5.2 (22.6)	2.9 (37.2)
Average precipitation mm (inches)	55 (2.2)	48 (1.9)	46 (1.8)	44 (1.7)	73 (2.9)	86 (3.4)	96 (3.8)	84 (3.3)	72 (2.8)	72 (2.8)	60 (2.4)	54 (2.1)	790 (31.1)
Source: https://en.climate-data.org/asia/russian-federation/smolensk-oblast/przhevalskoye-564000/

== Economy ==
=== Transportation ===
A paved road connects Przhevalskoye with Demidov, where it has access to R133 highway to Smolensk, Nevel via Velizh, and a road to Rudnya.

== Sights ==
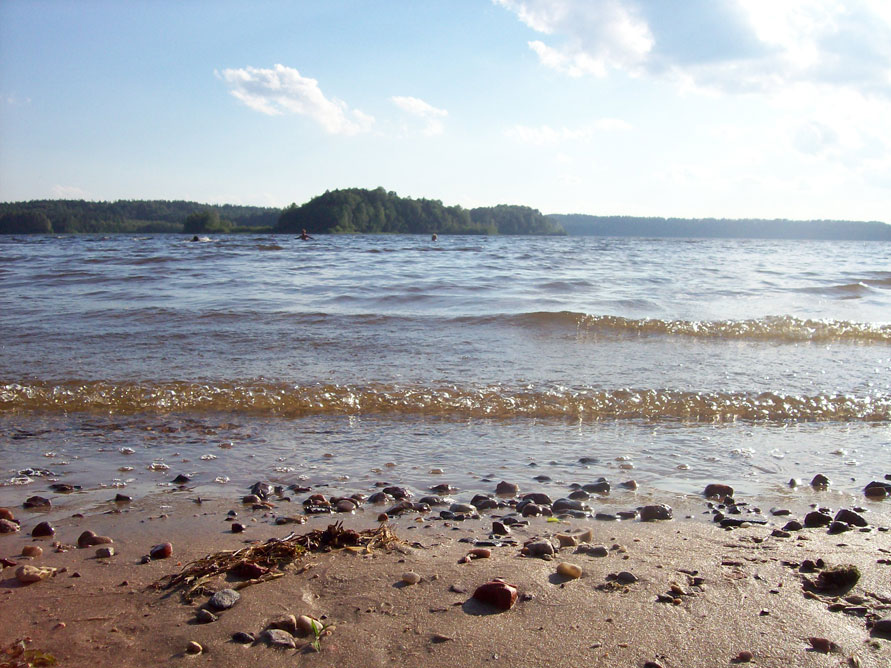
Lake Sapsho

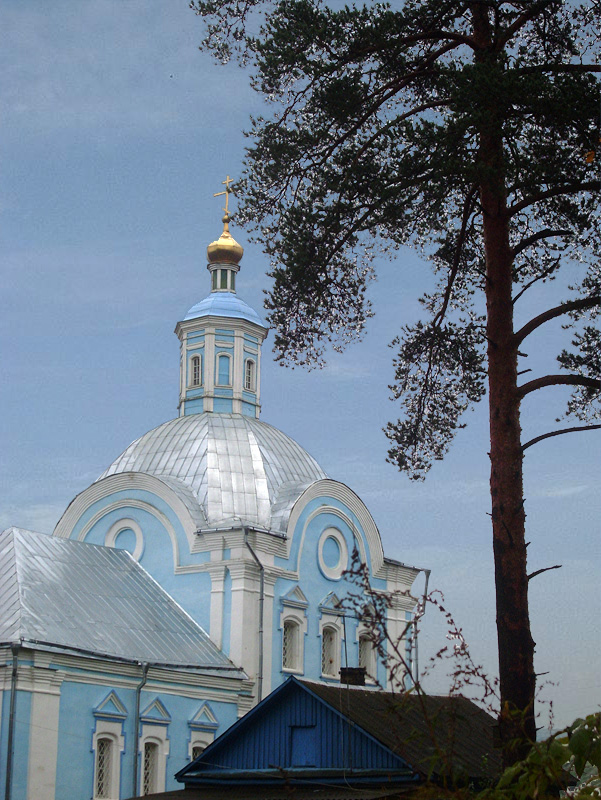
The church of the Ascension

- Lake Sapsho with its six islands and one "under-water island", as well as tumuli nearby
- Lake Mutnoye (sapropelic mud)
- Museum of Nikolay Przhevalsky, explorer of Central Asia
- The church of the Ascension
