= Sloboda (surname) =

Sloboda is a Slovak surname. In Slavic languages the primary meaning of the word is "freedom", "liberty". As the surname it used to refer to "free men" (to distinguish them from "serfs"). The cognate surnames in other Slavic languages include Svoboda and Swoboda.

Notable people with the surname include:

- Anton Sloboda (born 1987), Slovak footballer
- John Sloboda (born 1950), British cognitive psychologist
- Karol Sloboda (born 1983), Slovak professional ice hockey player
- Martin Sloboda (born 1990), Slovak professional ice hockey player
- Radoslav Sloboda, Slovak professional ice hockey player
- Radovan Sloboda (ice hockey) (born 1982), Slovak professional ice hockey player
- Radovan Sloboda (politician) (born 1966), Slovak politician and sports administrator
- Roman Sloboda (born 1987), Slovak footballer
- Rudolf Sloboda (1938–1995), Slovak author
