= Tomáš Svoboda =

Tomáš Svoboda may refer to:

- Tomáš Svoboda (composer) (1939–2022), French-born American classical composer
- Tomáš Svoboda (ice hockey) (born 1987), Czech ice hockey forward
- Tomáš Svoboda (triathlete) (born 1985), Czech triathlete and aquathlete
