= Sloboda, Totemsky District, Vologda Oblast =

Sloboda Слобода
- Village
- Location within Vologda Oblast Location within Russia
- Coordinates: 59°38′N 42°12′E
- Country: Russia
- Region: Vologda Oblast
- District: Totemsky District
- Time zone: UTC+3:00

Sloboda (Russian: Слобода) is a rural locality (a village) in Tolshmenskoye Rural Settlement, Totemsky District, Vologda Oblast, Russia. The population was 25 as of 2002. There are 2 streets.

== Geography ==
Sloboda is located 68 km southwest of Totma (the district's administrative centre) by road. Krasnoye is the nearest rural locality.
