= Sloboda, Sokolsky District, Vologda Oblast =

Sloboda Слобода
- Village
- Location within Vologda Oblast Location within Russia
- Coordinates: 59°26′N 40°12′E
- Country: Russia
- Region: Vologda Oblast
- District: Sokolsky District
- Time zone: UTC+3:00

Sloboda (Russian: Слобода) is a rural locality (a village) in Prigorodnoye Rural Settlement, Sokolsky District, Vologda Oblast, Russia. The population was 32 as of 2002.

== Geography ==
The distance to Sokol is 9 km, to Litega is 6 km. Boriskovo is the nearest rural locality.
