= Porechsky Uyezd =

Porechsky Uyezd (Поречский уезд) was one of the subdivisions of the Smolensk Governorate of the Russian Empire. It was situated in the northwestern part of the governorate. Its administrative centre was Porechye (Demidov).

== Demographics ==
At the time of the Russian Empire Census of 1897, Porechsky Uyezd had a population of 131,936. Of these, 97.0% spoke Russian, 1.1% Belarusian, 0.7% Latvian, 0.6% Yiddish, 0.3% Polish, 0.1% Estonian, 0.1% German and 0.1% Romani as their native language.
