= Sloboda, Nyuksensky District, Vologda Oblast =

Sloboda Слобода
- Village
- Location within Vologda Oblast Location within Russia
- Coordinates: 60°16′N 44°20′E
- Country: Russia
- Region: Vologda Oblast
- District: Nyuksensky District
- Time zone: UTC+3:00

Sloboda (Russian: Слобода) is a rural locality (a village) in Gorodishchenskoye Rural Settlement, Nyuksensky District, Vologda Oblast, Russia. The population was 28 as of 2002.

== Geography ==
Sloboda is located 34 km southeast of Nyuksenitsa (the district's administrative centre) by road. Perkhushkovo is the nearest rural locality.
