= NK Svoboda (disambiguation) =

NK Svoboda Ljubljana is a Slovenian football club.

NK Svoboda may also refer to the following Slovenian football clubs:

- NK Svoboda Kisovec
- NK Brežice 1919, formerly NK Svoboda Brežice

== See also ==
- FK Sloboda (disambiguation)
