= Demidovsky District =

Demidovsky District Демидовский район (Russian)
- District
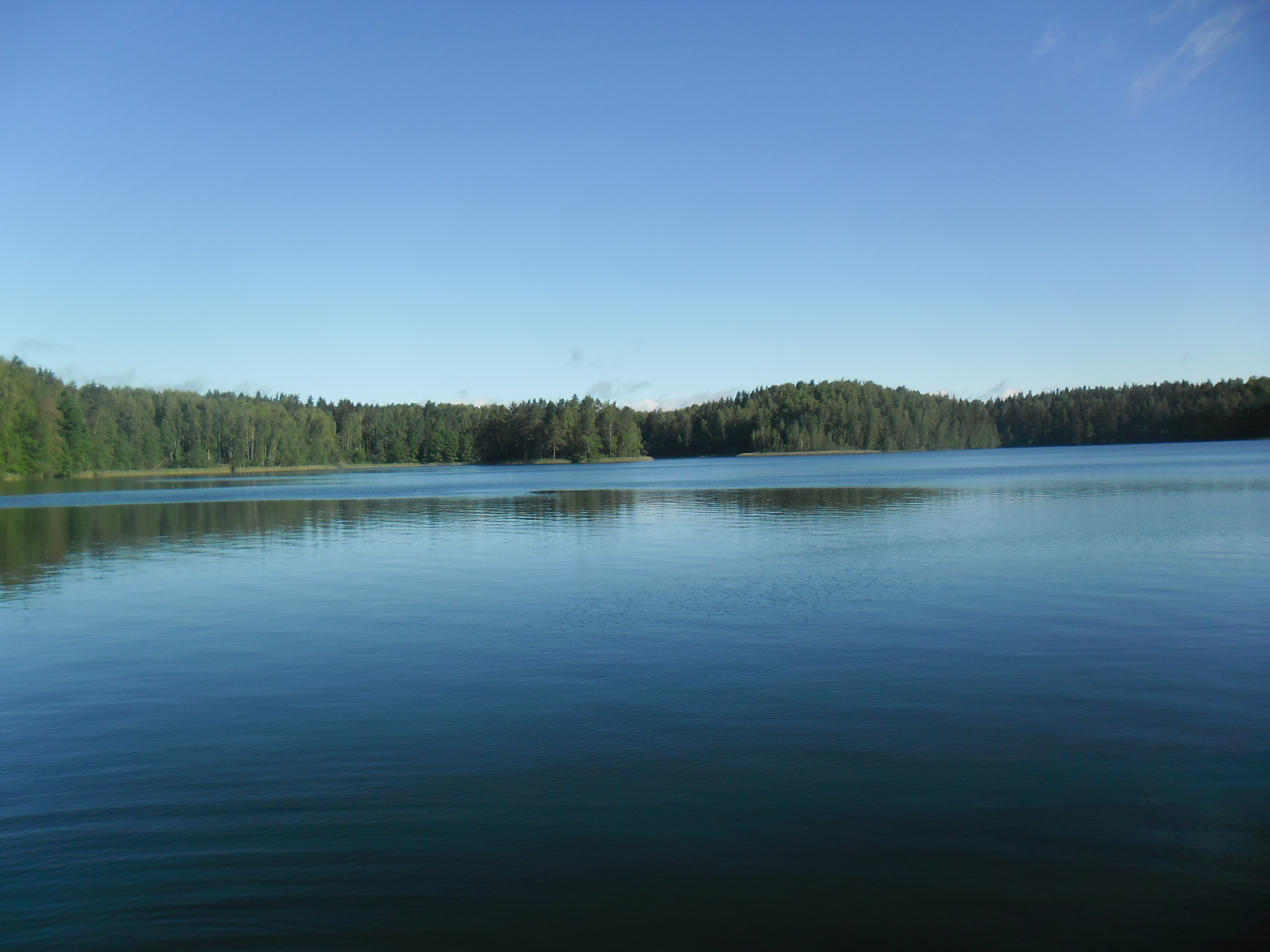
- Lake Chistik, a protected area of Russia in Demidovsky District

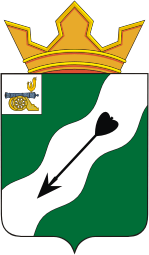
- Flag Coat of arms
- Location of Demidovsky District in Smolensk Oblast
- Coordinates: 55°16′N 31°31′E
- Country: Russia
- Federal subject: Smolensk Oblast
- Established: 1 October 1929
- Administrative center: Demidov

Area
  - Total: 2,514.02 km^{2} (970.67 sq mi)

Population (2010 Census)
  - Total: 14,039
  - Density: 5.5843/km^{2} (14.463/sq mi)
  - Urban: 64.2%
  - Rural: 35.8%

Administrative structure
  - Administrative divisions: 1 Urban settlements (towns), 1 Urban settlements (urban-type settlements), 15 Rural settlements
  - Inhabited localities: 1 cities/towns, 1 urban-type settlements, 231 rural localities

Municipal structure
  - Municipally incorporated as: Demidovsky Municipal District
  - Municipal divisions: 2 urban settlements, 4 rural settlements
- Time zone: UTC+3 (MSK)
- OKTMO ID: 66611000
- Website: http://demidov.admin-smolensk.ru

Demidovsky District (Russian: Деми́довский райо́н) is an administrative and municipal district (raion), one of the twenty-five in Smolensk Oblast, Russia. It is located in the northwest of the oblast and borders with Zharkovsky District of Tver Oblast in the north, Velizhsky District in the northwest, Rudnyansky District in the southwest, Smolensky District in the south, and with Dukhovshchinsky District in the east. The area of the district is 2,514.02 square kilometers (970.67 sq mi). Its administrative center is the town of Demidov. Population: 14,039 (2010 Census); 18,167 (2002 census); 24,237 (1989 Soviet census). The population of Demidov accounts for 52.2% of the district's total population.

== Geography ==
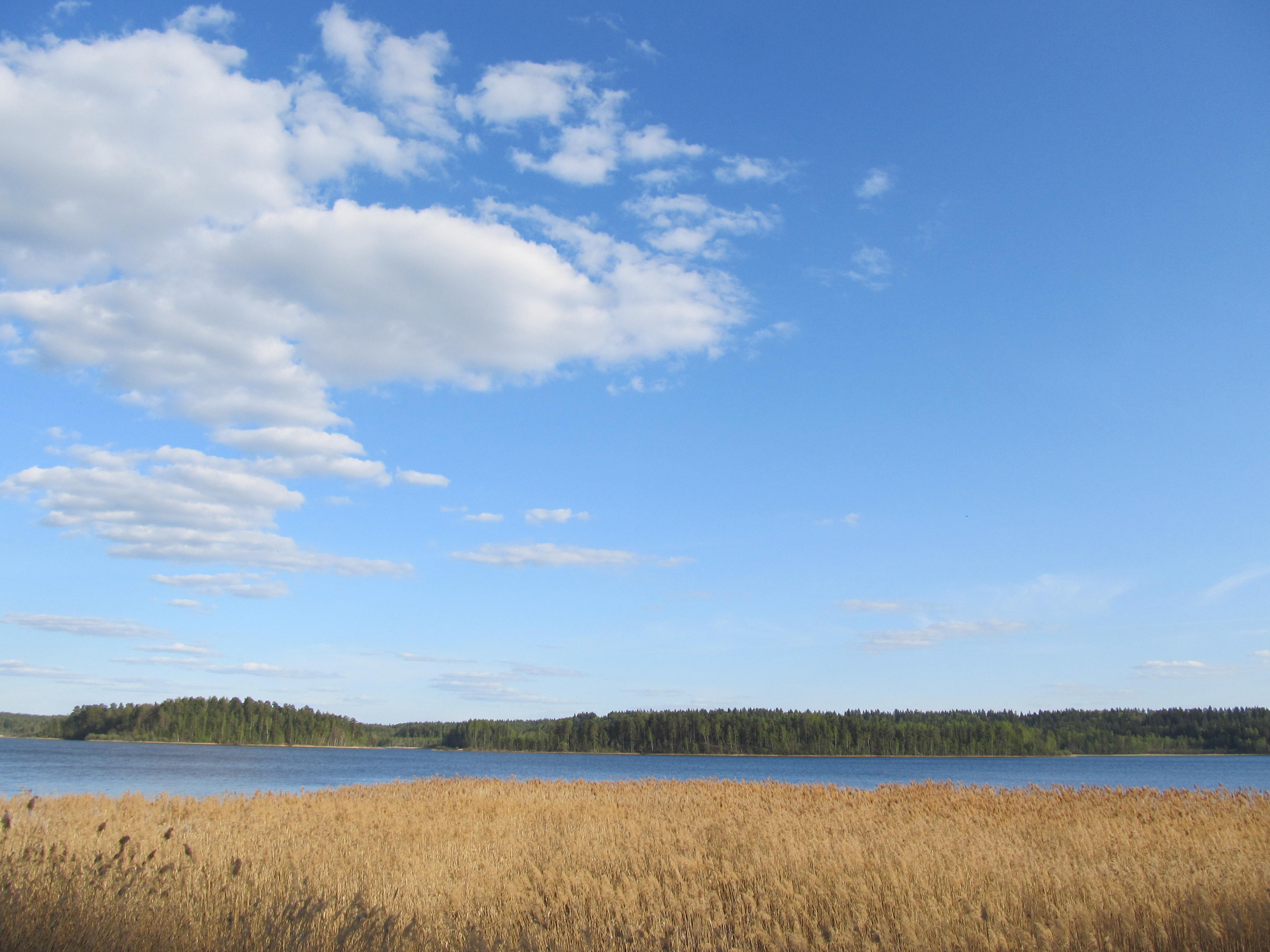
Lake Sapsho, Smolenskoye Poozerye National Park

The area of the district belongs to the drainage basin of the Western Dvina. Major rivers flowing through the district include the Kasplya, a major left tributary of the Western Dvina, the Cherebesna, a left tributary of the Kasplya, the Vyatsha, a right tributary of the Cherebesna, and the Yelsha, a left tributary of the Mezha. There are many lakes, most significant of which are Lake Sapsho, Lake Dgo, and Lake Baklanovskoye. 58.4% of the district's territory is covered by forests. A portion of Smolenskoye Poozerye National Park is located in the district; the park is shared between Demidovsky and Dukhovshchinsky Districts.

== History ==
The area was settled in the prehistory, and, as the Western Dvina always has been an important waterway, there are multiple archaeological sites in the district. The fortress of Porechye is first mentioned in 1499, and since 1514 it belonged to the Grand Duchy of Moscow, at the border with the Grand Duchy of Lithuania. In 1580, after the Livonian War, the area was transferred to Poland, where it was included into Vitebsk Voivodeship. In 1667, according to the Truce of Andrusovo, it was transferred back to Russia. Subsequently Porechye developed as an important trading post since it was located at the intersection of roads connecting Saint Petersburg with Kiev and Moscow with Riga. The Kasplya was navigable until mid-19th century, and Porechye sent ships to Riga. Later, it lost its trade important, since the Kasplya became more shallow, and the railway between Moscow and Riga went via Velikiye Luki, far from Porechye.

In the course of the administrative reform carried out in 1708 by Peter the Great, the area was included into Smolensk Governorate and remained there until 1929, with the exception of the brief periods between 1713 and 1726, when it belonged to Riga Governorate, and between 1775 and 1796, when Smolensk Governorate was transformed into Smolensk Viceroyalty. In 1776, Porechye was granted a town status, and Porechsky Uyezd with the center in Porechye was established. On 19 November 1918, Porechye was renamed Demidov, to commemorate the bolshevik Yakov Demidov, who was the chairman of the Uyezd Communist Party Committee and was killed during the Russian Civil War. Porechsky Uyezd was renamed Demidovsky Uyezd. In 1927, Demidovsky Uyezd was abolished. Part of the area was transferred to Yartsevsky Uyezd of Smolensk Governorate.

On 12 July 1929, governorates and uyezds were abolished, and Demidovsky District with the administrative center in Demidov was established. The district belonged to Smolensk Okrug of Western Oblast. On August 1, 1930 the okrugs were abolished, and the districts were subordinated directly to the oblast. On 27 September 1937 Western Oblast was abolished and split between Oryol and Smolensk Oblasts. Demidovsky District was transferred to Smolensk Oblast. Between 1941 and September 1943, during WWII, the district was occupied by German troops. On 1 February 1963, during the abortive Khrushchyov administrative reform, Velizhsky District was merged into Demidovsky District, but on 12 January 1965 it was re-established.

On 12 July 1929, Kasplyansky District with the administrative center in the selo of Kasplya was established as well in the areas which previously belonged to Demidovsky, Dukhovshchinsky, and Smolensky Uyezds. The district belonged to Smolensk Okrug of Western Oblast. On 1 February 1932, the district was abolished and split between Demidovsky, Dukhovshchinsky, Rudnyansky, and Smolensky Districts. In 1938, it was re-established; it belonged to Smolensk Oblast. In 1961, Kasplyansky District was abolished and merged into Smolensky District.

Another district established on 12 July 1929 was Ponizovsky District with the administrative center in the selo of Ponizovye. It was created in the areas which previously belonged to Demidovsky Uyezd. The district belonged to Smolensk Okrug of Western Oblast. In 1930, the district was abolished and split between Demidovsky and Rudnyansky Districts. In 1935, it was re-established, and in 1937, it was transferred to Smolensk Oblast. In 1961, Ponizovsky District was abolished and split between Demidovsky and Rudnyansky Districts.

One more district established on 12 July 1929 was Prechistensky with the administrative center in the selo of Prechistoye. It was created in the areas which previously belonged to Belsky, Demidovsky, and Dukhovshchinsky Uyezds. The district belonged to Smolensk Okrug of Western Oblast. In 1934, the district was abolished and split between Belsky, Demidovsky, Dukhovshchinsky, and Ilyinsky Districts. In 1935, it was re-established, and in 1937, it was transferred to Smolensk Oblast. In 1961, Prechistensky District was abolished and merged into Dukhovshchinsky District.

On 12 July 1929 Slobodskoy District with the administrative center in the selo of Sloboda was also established. It was created in the areas which previously belonged to Demidovsky Uyezd. The district belonged to Smolensk Okrug of Western Oblast. In 1930, the district was abolished and split between Demidovsky, Ilyinsky, Prechistensky, and Velizhsky Districts. In 1938, it was re-established. In 1960, Slobodskoy District was abolished and merged into Demidovsky District.

== Economy ==
=== Industry ===
The economy of the district is based on agriculture and timber industry; production of building materials is also developed.

=== Agriculture ===
The main agricultural specialization of the district are cattle breeding with meat and milk production.

=== Transportation ===
Paved roads connect Demidov with Smolensk, with Nevel via Velizh, and with Rudnya. There are also local roads with bus traffic originating from Demidov.

There are no railways in the district. The closest railway station is in Rudnya, on the railway connecting Smolensk with Vitebsk.

== Culture and recreation ==
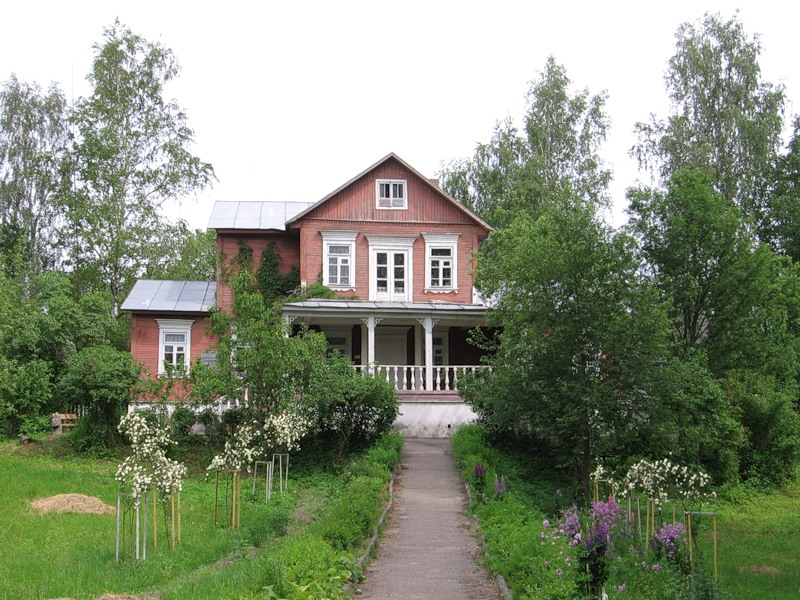
Nikolay Przhevalsky Estate, Przhevalskoye.

The estate formerly owned by the geographer and explorer of Central Asia Nikolay Przhevalsky in the urban-type settlement of Przhevalskoye, as well as a number of archaeological sites, are designated cultural monuments of federal significance. The Przhevalsky Estate has been converted to a memorial museum.
