= Sloboda, Kichmengsko-Gorodetsky District, Vologda Oblast =

Sloboda Слобода
- Village
- Location within Vologda Oblast Location within Russia
- Coordinates: 60°01′N 45°51′E
- Country: Russia
- Region: Vologda Oblast
- District: Kichmengsko-Gorodetsky District
- Time zone: UTC+3:00

Sloboda (Russian: Слобода) is a rural locality (a village) in Kichmegnskoye Rural Settlement, Kichmengsko-Gorodetsky District, Vologda Oblast, Russia. The population was 309 as of 2002. There are 7 streets.

== Geography ==
Sloboda is located 7 km northeast of Kichmengsky Gorodok (the district's administrative centre) by road. Lobanovo is the nearest rural locality.
