= Albin Swoboda =

Albin Swoboda may refer to:

- Albin Swoboda, Sr. (1836-1901), operatic tenor
- Albin Swoboda, Jr. (1883-1970), operatic bass-baritone and son of Albin Swoboda, Sr.
