= Demidov, Smolensk Oblast =

Town in Smolensk Oblast, Russia

Demidov Демидов
- Town
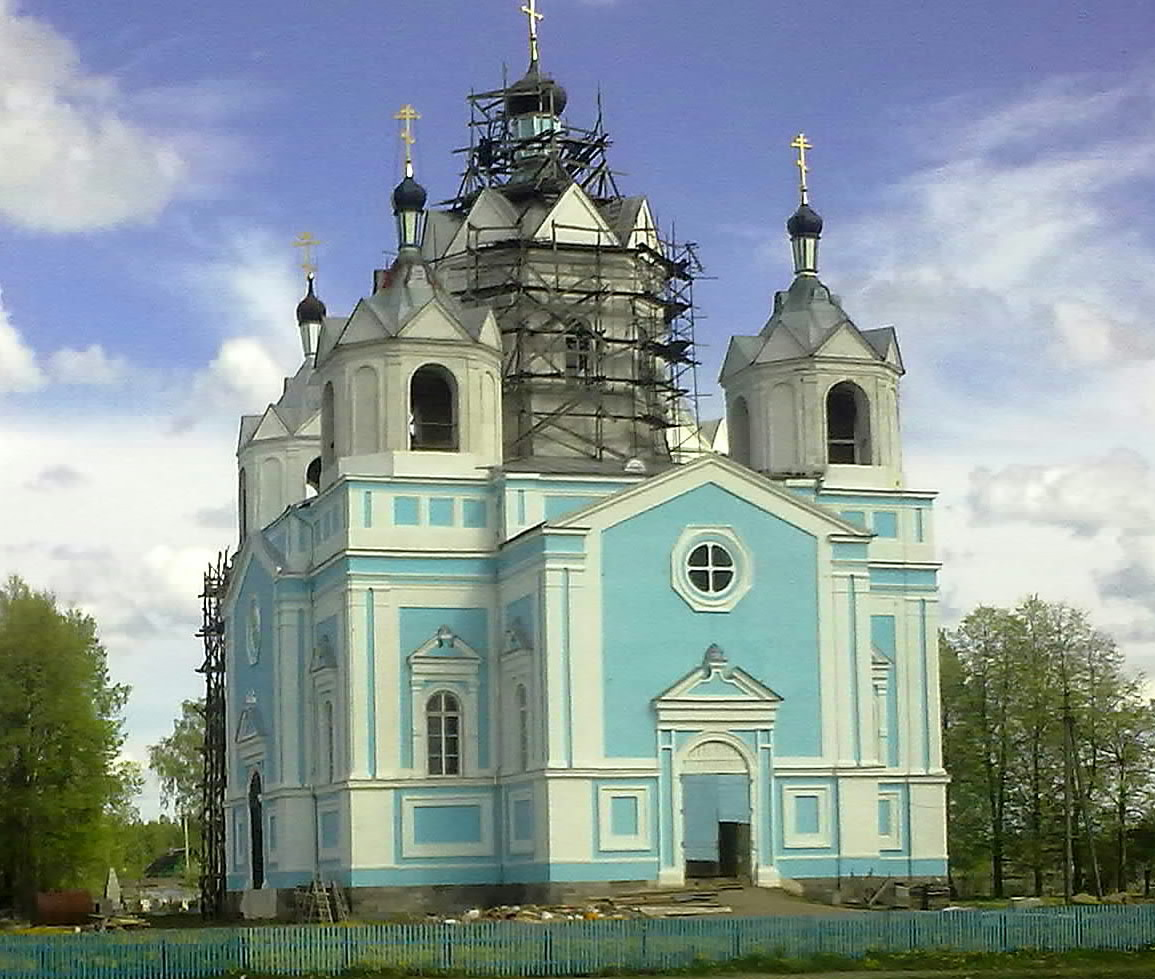
- The Dormition Cathedral, Demidov

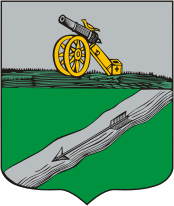
- Coat of arms
- Interactive map of Demidov
- Location of Demidov Demidov (Smolensk Oblast)
- Coordinates: 55°16′N 31°31′E
- Country: Russia
- Federal subject: Smolensk Oblast
- Administrative district: Demidovsky District
- Urban settlementSelsoviet: Demidovskoye
- Town status since: 1776

Area
  - Total: 78.92 km^{2} (30.47 sq mi)
- Elevation: 160 m (520 ft)

Population (2010 Census)
  - Total: 19,738
  - Estimate (2024): 6,261 (−68.3%)
  - Density: 250.1/km^{2} (647.8/sq mi)

Administrative status
  - Capital of: Demidovsky District, Demidovskoye Urban Settlement

Municipal status
  - Municipal district: Demidovsky Municipal District
  - Urban settlement: Demidovskoye Urban Settlement
  - Capital of: Demidovsky Municipal District, Demidovskoye Urban Settlement
- Time zone: UTC+3 (MSK)
- Postal codes: 216240, 216279
- OKTMO ID: 66611101001

Demidov (Russian: Деми́дов) is a town and the administrative center of Demidovsky District in Smolensk Oblast, Russia, located on the Kasplya River at its confluence with the Gobza River. Population: 7,333 (2010 census); 8,786 (2002 census); 10,198 (1989 Soviet census). It was previously known as Porechye (until 1918).

== History ==
The area was settled in the prehistory, and, as the Western Dvina always has been an important waterway, there are multiple archaeological sites in the district. The fortress of Porechye (Поре́чье) is first mentioned in 1499, and since 1514 it belonged to the Grand Duchy of Moscow, at the border with the Grand Duchy of Lithuania. In 1580, after the Livonian War, the area was transferred to Poland, where it was included into Vitebsk Voivodeship. In 1667, according to the Truce of Andrusovo, it was transferred back to Russia. Subsequently Porechye developed as an important trading post since it was located at the intersection of roads connecting Saint Petersburg with Kiev and Moscow with Riga. The Kasplya was navigable until mid-19th century, and Porechye sent ships to Riga. Later, it lost its trade important, since the Kasplya became more shallow, and the railway between Moscow and Riga went via Velikiye Luki, far from Porechye.

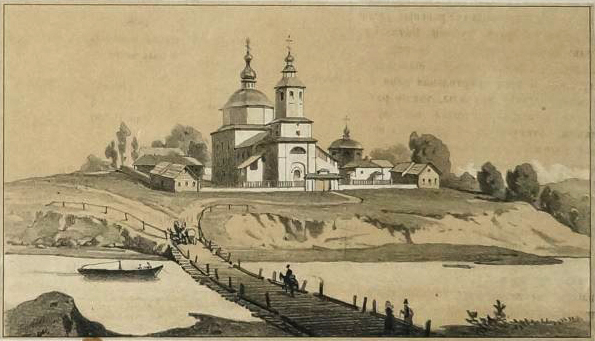
Porechye in 1858

In the course of the administrative reform carried out in 1708 by Peter the Great, the area was included into Smolensk Governorate and remained there until 1929, with the exception of the brief periods between 1713 and 1726, when it belonged to Riga Governorate, and between 1775 and 1796, when Smolensk Governorate was transformed into Smolensk Viceroyalty. In 1776, Porechye was granted a town status, and Porechsky Uyezd with the center in Porechye was established. On 19 November 1918, Porechye was renamed Demidov, to commemorate the bolshevik Yakov Demidov, who was the chairman of the Uyezd Communist Party Committee and was killed during the Russian Civil War. Porechsky Uyezd was renamed Demidovsky Uyezd. In 1927, Demidovsky Uyezd was abolished.

On 12 July 1929, governorates and uyezds were abolished, and Demidovsky District with the administrative center in Demidov was established. The district belonged to Smolensk Okrug of Western Oblast. On August 1, 1930 the okrugs were abolished, and the districts were subordinated directly to the oblast. On 27 September 1937 Western Oblast was abolished and split between Oryol and Smolensk Oblasts. Demidovsky District was transferred to Smolensk Oblast. Between 1941 and September 1943, during WWII, the district was occupied by German troops.

== Administrative and municipal status ==
Within the framework of administrative divisions, Demidov serves as the administrative center of Demidovsky District. As an administrative division, it is, together with four rural localities, incorporated within Demidovsky District as Demidovskoye Urban Settlement. As a municipal division, this administrative unit also has urban settlement status and is a part of Demidovsky Municipal District.

== Economy ==
=== Industry ===
In Demidov, there are enterprises of timber and construction industries.

=== Transportation ===
Paved roads connect Demidov with Smolensk, with Nevel via Velizh, and with Rudnya. There are also local roads with bus traffic originating from Demidov.

The closest railway station is in Rudnya, on the railway connecting Smolensk with Vitebsk.

== Culture and recreation ==
A couple of dozens of 18-19th century buildings survived; they are designated cultural monuments. One of them is the Dormition Church, built between 1852 and 1861. Several monuments to soldiers and civilians killed during the Russian Civil war and during WWII has been also designated historic monuments.
