= Słoboda, Podkarpackie Voivodeship =

Słoboda
- Village
- Location within Poland
- Coordinates: 50°18′4″N 22°36′23″E
- Country: Poland
- Voivodeship: Subcarpathian
- County: Leżajsk
- Gmina: Kuryłówka
- Population: 150

Słoboda [swɔˈbɔda] is a village in the administrative district of Gmina Kuryłówka, within Leżajsk County, Subcarpathian Voivodeship, in south-eastern Poland.
