= Yershichsky District =

Yershichsky District Ершичский район (Russian)
- District
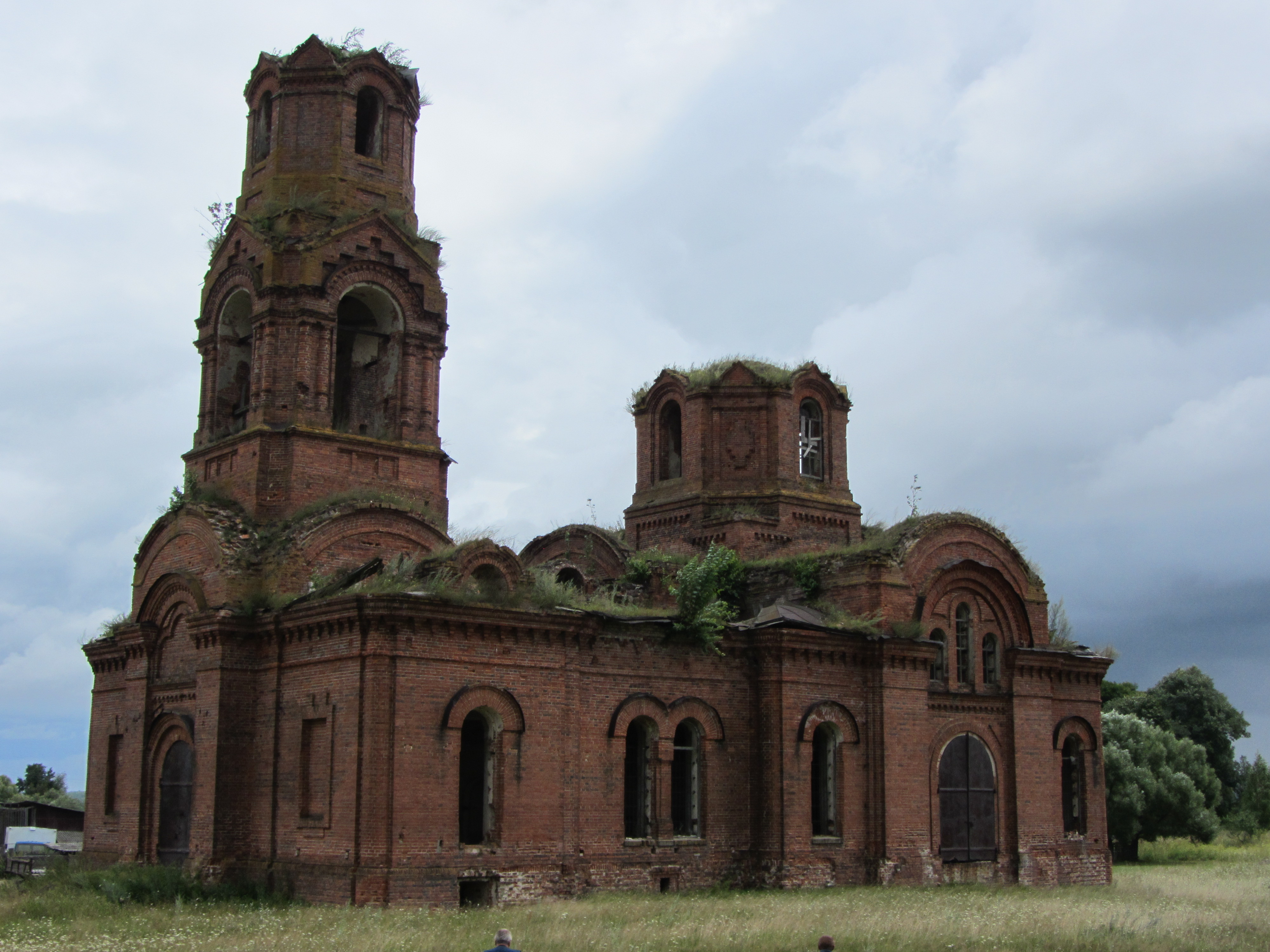
- Former church in the village of Korsiki

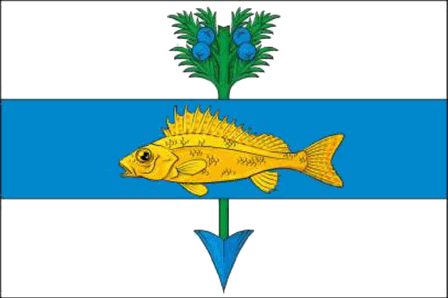
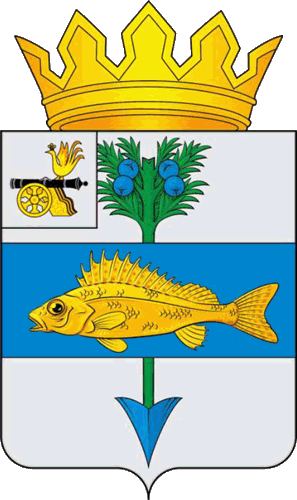
- Flag Coat of arms
- Location of Yershichsky District in Smolensk Oblast
- Coordinates: 53°24′49″N 32°47′06″E
- Country: Russia
- Federal subject: Smolensk Oblast
- Established: 1929
- Administrative center: Yershichi

Area
  - Total: 1,039.00 km^{2} (401.16 sq mi)

Population (2010 Census)
  - Total: 7,102
  - Density: 6.835/km^{2} (17.70/sq mi)
  - Urban: 0%
  - Rural: 100%

Administrative structure
  - Administrative divisions: 9 rural settlement
  - Inhabited localities: 79 rural localities

Municipal structure
  - Municipally incorporated as: Yershichsky Municipal District
  - Municipal divisions: 0 urban settlements, 9 rural settlements
- Time zone: UTC+3 (MSK)
- OKTMO ID: 66621000
- Website: http://ershichadm.admin-smolensk.ru/

Yershichsky District (Russian: Ершичский райо́н) is an administrative and municipal district (raion), one of the twenty-five in Smolensk Oblast, Russia. It is located in the south of the oblast and borders with Roslavlsky District in the north, Dubrovsky District of Bryansk Oblast in the east, Kletnyansky District, also of Bryansk Oblast, in the south, Khotsimsk District of Mogilev Region of Belarus in the southwest, Klimavichy District of Mogilev Region in the west, and with Shumyachsky District in the northwest. The area of the district is 1,039.00 square kilometers (401.16 sq mi). Its administrative center is the rural locality (a selo) of Yershichi. Population: 7,102 (2010 Census); 8,859 (2002 census); 11,544 (1989 Soviet census). The population of Yershichi accounts for 44.6% of the district's total population.

== Geography ==
The whole area of the district belongs to the drainage basin of the Sozh River, a left tributary of the Dnieper. The major tributaries of the Sozh (both left) flowing through the district are the Besed River (which has its source in Yershichsky District) and the Iput River. Yershichi is located on the right bank of the Iput River.

== History ==
Historically, the area belonged intermittently to the Principality of Smolensk and the Grand Duchy of Lithuania, subsequently to Poland. In the course of the administrative reform carried out in 1708 by Peter the Great, it was included into Smolensk Governorate and remained there until 1929, with the exception of the brief periods between 1713 and 1726, when it belonged to Riga Governorate, and between 1775 and 1796, when Smolensk Governorate was transformed into Smolensk Viceroyalty. It belonged to Roslavlsky Uyezd.

On 12 July 1929, governorates and uyezds were abolished, and Yershichsky District with the administrative center in the selo of Yershich was established. The district belonged to Roslavl Okrug of Western Oblast. On August 1, 1930, the okrugs were abolished, and the districts were subordinated directly to the oblast. In 1932, the district was abolished and split between Roslavlsky and Kletnyansky Districts of Western Oblast. In 1935, it was re-established. On 27 September 1937 Western Oblast was abolished and split between Oryol and Smolensk Oblasts. Yershichsky District was transferred to Smolensk Oblast. Between August 1941 and 1943, during WWII, the district was occupied by German troops. In 1963, during the abortive Khrushchyov administrative reform, Yershichsky District was merged into Shumyachsky District. In 1972, it was re-established.

== Economy ==
=== Industry ===
There are several enterprises in the district producing construction materials.

=== Agriculture ===
The main agricultural specializations are cattle and pig breeding with meat and milk production as well as growing of crops and potatoes.

=== Transportation ===
Yershichi is connected by paved roads with Roslavl and with Shumyachi. There are local roads as well.

== Culture and recreation ==
There is a private ethnographic museum in a ghost village of Novaya Matsilevka, which is unattended.
