= Uts (river) =

River in Belarus

Uts Vuts
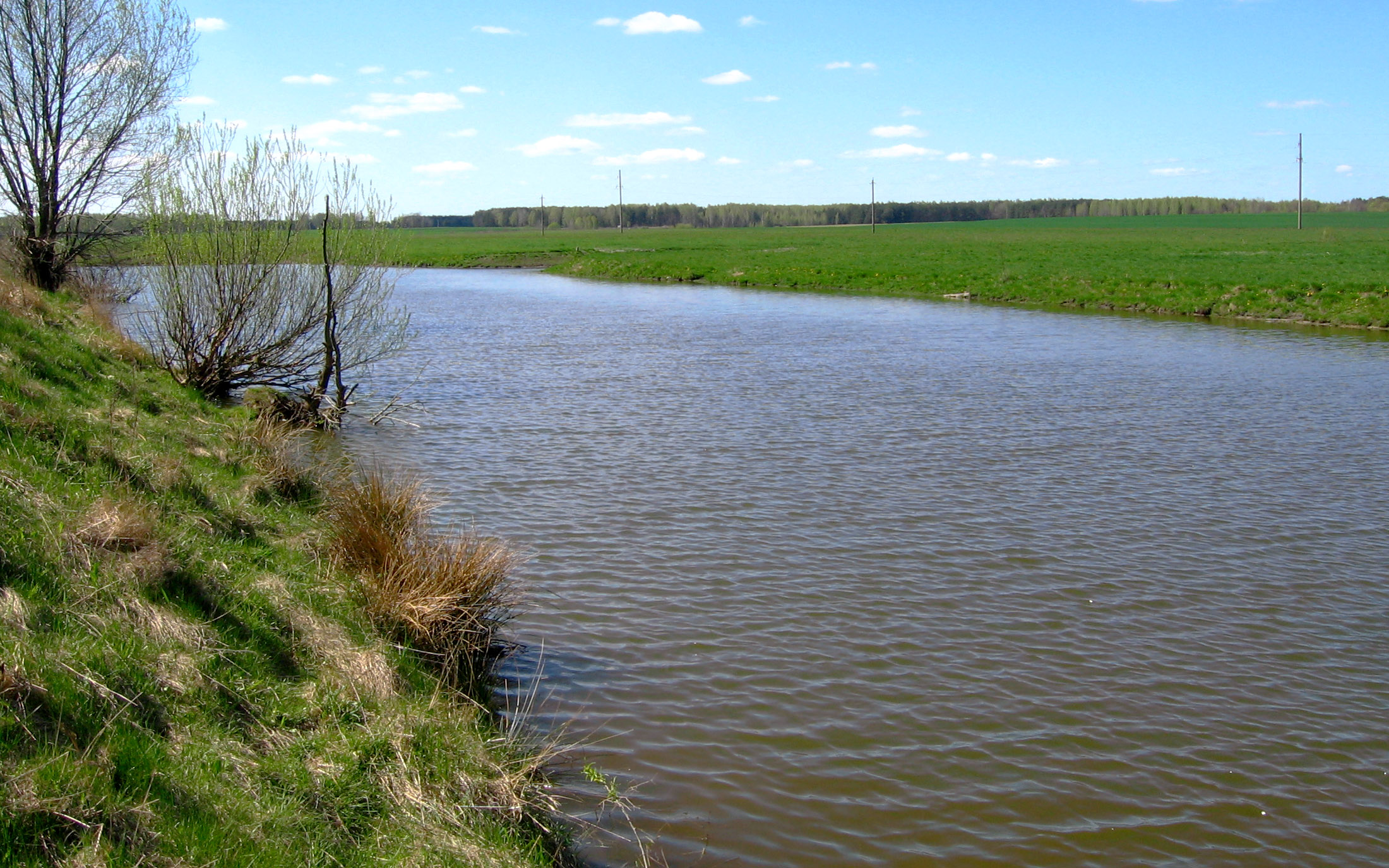
- Uts River in a middle flow
- Native name: Уць (Belarusian); Вуць (Belarusian); Уть (Russian)

Location
- Country: Belarus

Physical characteristics
- Source
  - location: Dobrush District
- Mouth
  - location: Sozh
  - coordinates: 52.2443°N 30.9426°E
- Length: 75 km (47 mi)
- Basin size: 433 km^{2} (167 sq mi)

Basin features
- Progression: Sozh→ Dnieper→ Dnieper–Bug estuary→ Black Sea

The Uts or Vuts (Belarusian: Уць or Вуць, Russian: Уть), is a 75-kilometre-long (47 mi) river in the Gomel Region of Belarus.

The Uts flows through Dobrush District and Gomel District and is a left tributary of the Sozh.

== Gallery ==
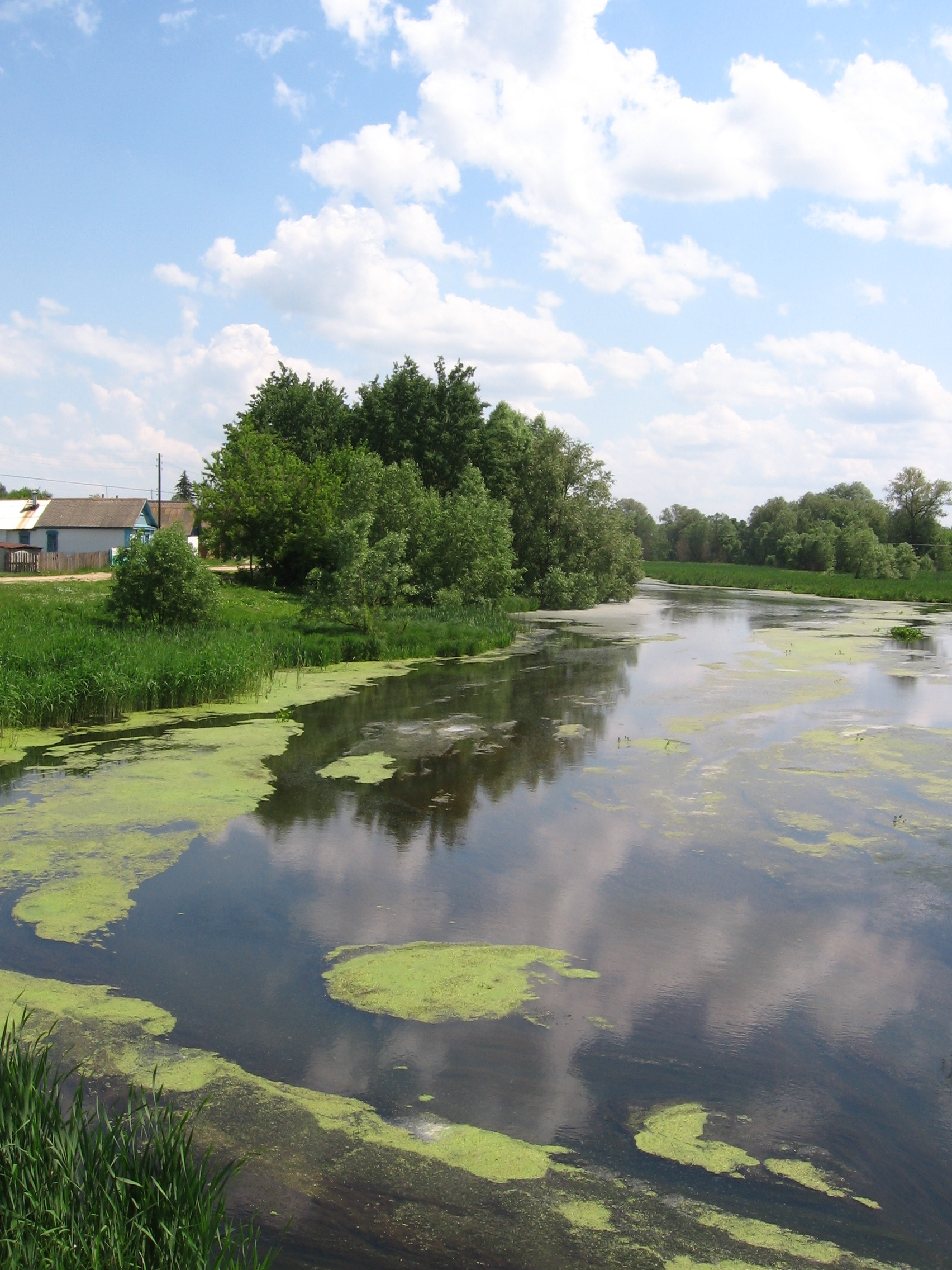
Uts River in its upstream between Vysoky Hutor and Uts village, Dobrush District, Gomel Region

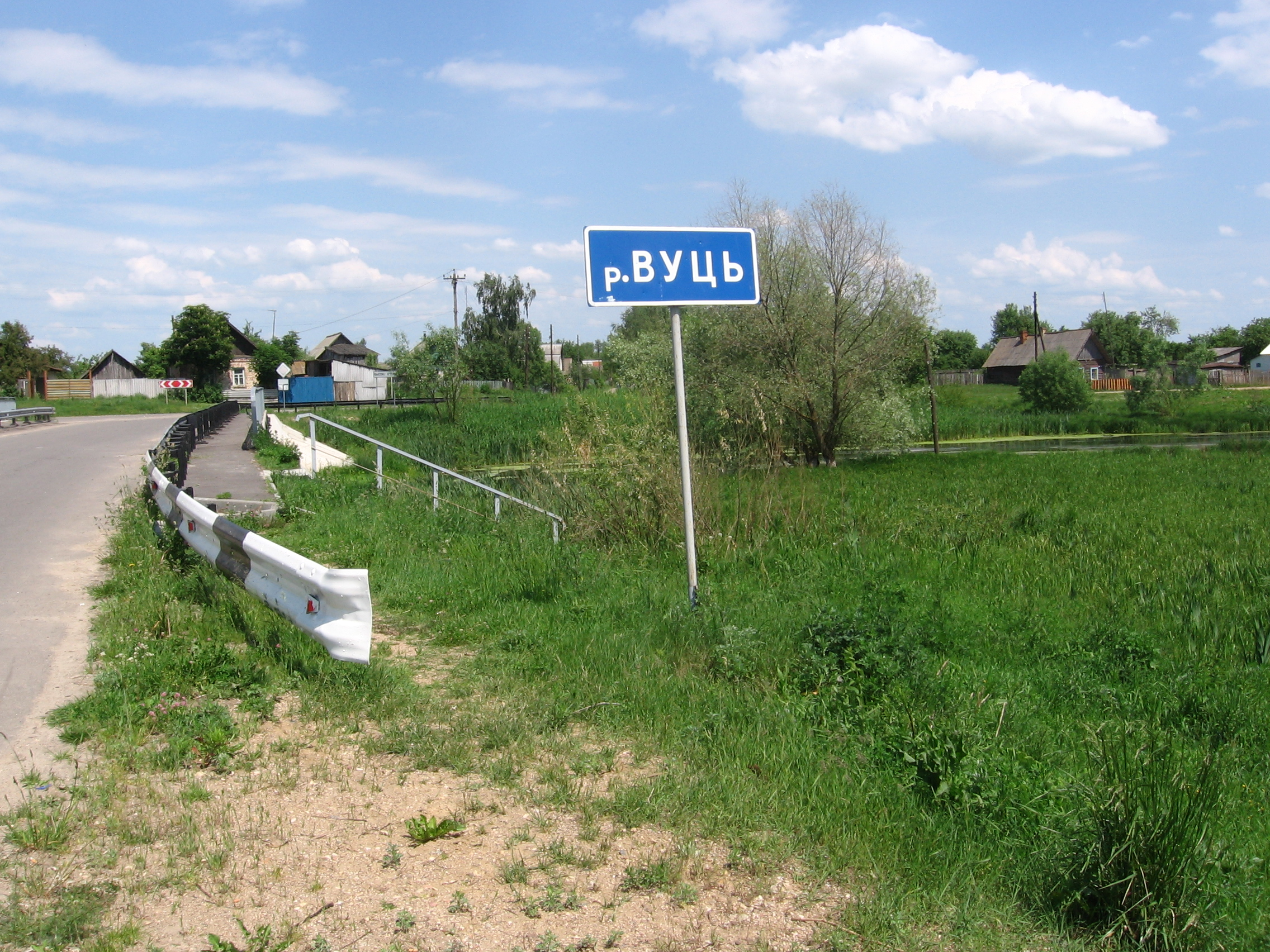
The bridge across Uts River connecting Uts Village and Vysoky Hutor, Dobrush District, Gomel Region
