= Besed =

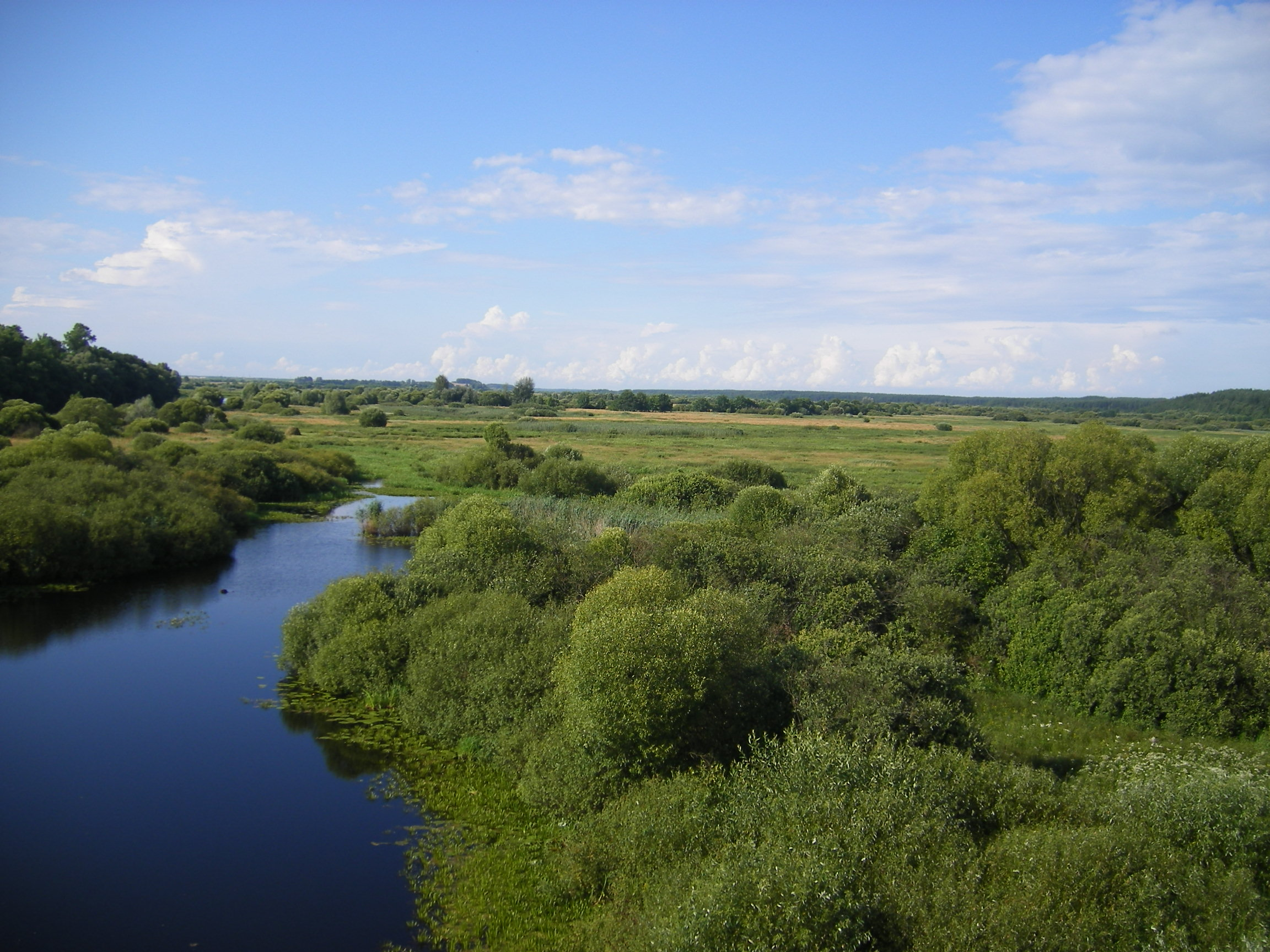

Location
- Country: Belarus, Russia

Physical characteristics
- Source
  - location: Yershichsky District, Russia
  - coordinates: 53.6684°N 32.6222°E
- Mouth: Sozh River
  - location: near Vietka, Belarus
  - coordinates: 52.6251°N 31.1399°E
- Length: 261 km (162 mi)
- Basin size: 5,600 km^{2} (2,200 sq mi)

Basin features
- Progression: Sozh→ Dnieper→ Dnieper–Bug estuary→ Black Sea

The Besed or Biesiedź (Belarusian: Беседзь; Russian: Беседь) is a river of Belarus (Mogilev Region and Gomel Region) and Russia (Smolensk Oblast and Bryansk Oblast). It is a left-bank tributary of the Sozh River in the Dnieper basin. The Besed is 261 kilometres (162 mi) long, and has a drainage basin of 5,600 square kilometres (2,200 sq mi).
