= Yershichi =

Yershichi Ершичи
- Settlement
- Interactive map of Yershichi
- Location of Yershichi Yershichi (Smolensk Oblast)
- Country: Russia
- Federal subject: Smolensk Oblast
- Administrative district: Yershichsky District
- Selsoviet: Yershichsky Selsoviet

Population (2010 Census)
  - Total: 3,169
  - Estimate (2002): 3,326 (+5%)

Administrative status
  - Capital of: Yershichsky District, Yershichsky Selsoviet

Municipal status
  - Municipal district: Yershichsky Municipal District
  - Rural settlement: Yershichskoye Rural Settlement
  - Capital of: Yershichsky Municipal District
- Time zone: UTC+3 (MSK)
- Postal code: 216580
- OKTMO ID: 66621433101

Yershichi (Russian: Ершичи) is a rural locality (a selo) and the administrative center of Yershichsky District of Smolensk Oblast, Russia. It is located on the right bank of the Iput River. Population: 3,169 (2010 census); 3,326 (2002 census); 3,808 (1989 Soviet census).

== History ==
Yershichi is known as a village since the late 16th or the early 17th century; it became a selo in 1730. At that time, it belonged to Smolensk Governorate and remained there until 1929, with the exception of the brief periods between 1713 and 1726, when it belonged to Riga Governorate, and between 1775 and 1796, when Smolensk Governorate was transformed into Smolensk Viceroyalty. It belonged to Roslavlsky Uyezd.

On 12 July 1929, governorates and uyezds were abolished, and Yershichsky District with the administrative center in Yershich was established. The district belonged to Roslavl Okrug of Western Oblast. On August 1, 1930, the okrugs were abolished, and the districts were subordinated directly to the oblast. In 1932, the district was abolished and split between Roslavlsky and Kletnyansky Districts of Western Oblast. In 1935, it was re-established. On 27 September 1937 Western Oblast was abolished and split between Oryol and Smolensk Oblasts. Yershichsky District was transferred to Smolensk Oblast. Between August 1941 and 1943, during WWII, the district was occupied by German troops. In 1963, during the abortive Khrushchyov administrative reform, Yershichsky District was merged into Shumyachsky District. In 1972, it was re-established.

== Climate ==
Yershichi has a warm-summer humid continental climate (Dfb in the Köppen climate classification).

Climate data for Yershichi
Month	Jan	Feb	Mar	Apr	May	Jun	Jul	Aug	Sep	Oct	Nov	Dec	Year
Mean daily maximum °C (°F)	−4.2 (24.4)	−3.3 (26.1)	2.3 (36.1)	11.7 (53.1)	18.1 (64.6)	21.1 (70.0)	23.5 (74.3)	22.4 (72.3)	16.5 (61.7)	9.3 (48.7)	2.8 (37.0)	−1.4 (29.5)	9.9 (49.8)
Daily mean °C (°F)	−6.1 (21.0)	−5.6 (21.9)	−0.9 (30.4)	7.3 (45.1)	13.8 (56.8)	17.3 (63.1)	19.7 (67.5)	18.4 (65.1)	12.9 (55.2)	6.5 (43.7)	1 (34)	−3.1 (26.4)	6.8 (44.2)
Mean daily minimum °C (°F)	−8.4 (16.9)	−8.2 (17.2)	−4.5 (23.9)	2.2 (36.0)	8.7 (47.7)	12.4 (54.3)	15.2 (59.4)	14 (57)	9.1 (48.4)	3.7 (38.7)	−0.9 (30.4)	−5.1 (22.8)	3.2 (37.7)
Average precipitation mm (inches)	51 (2.0)	45 (1.8)	46 (1.8)	49 (1.9)	71 (2.8)	83 (3.3)	97 (3.8)	72 (2.8)	63 (2.5)	67 (2.6)	54 (2.1)	51 (2.0)	749 (29.4)
Source: https://en.climate-data.org/asia/russian-federation/smolensk-oblast/yershichi-109836/

== Economy ==
=== Industry ===
There are several enterprises in Yershichi producing construction materials.

=== Transportation ===
Yershichi is connected by paved roads with Roslavl and with Shumyachi. There are local roads as well.
