= Iput (river) =

Iput Belarusian: Іпуць Russian: Ипуть
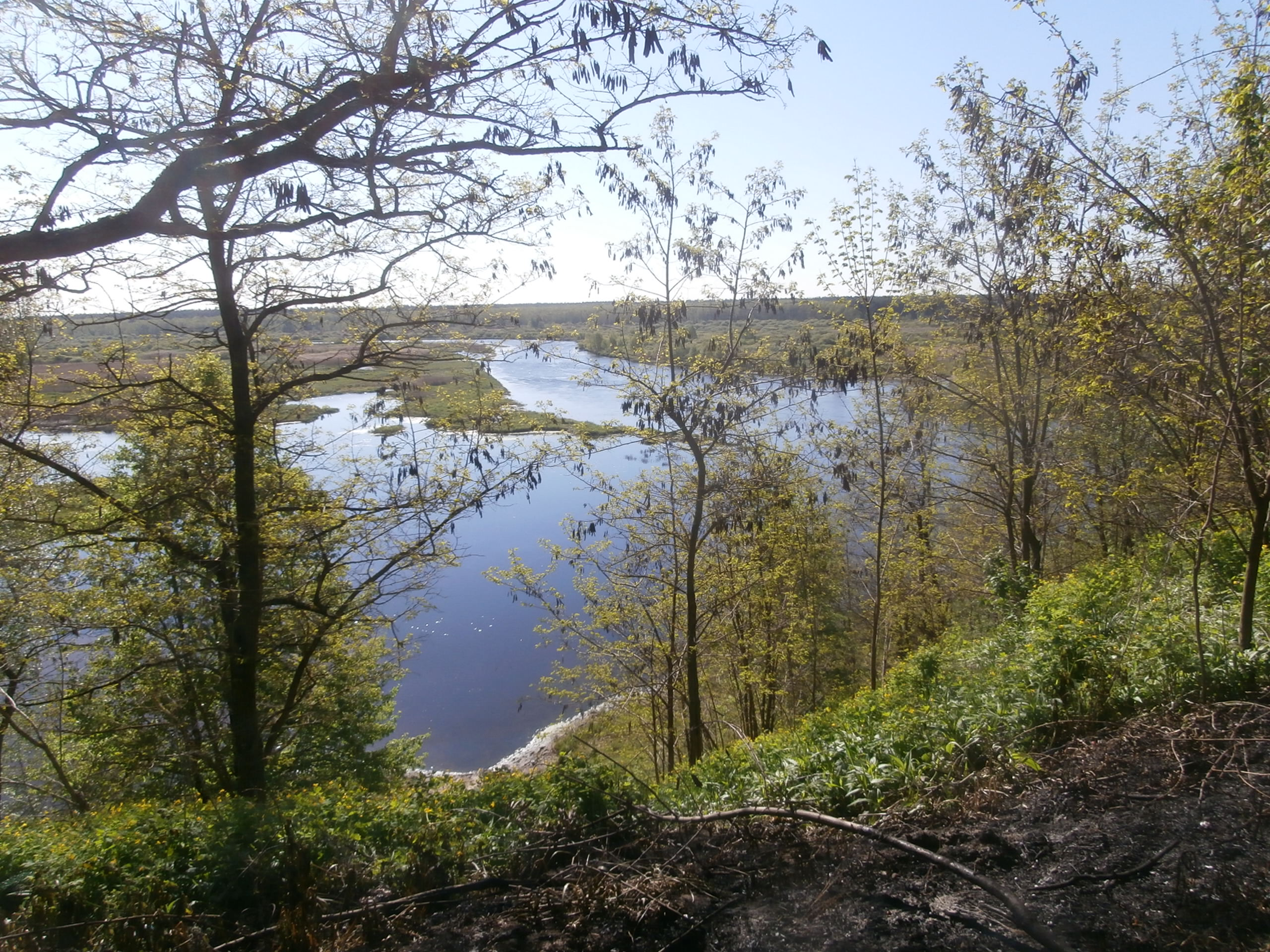
- The Iput in Dobrush

Location
- Country: Russia, Belarus

Physical characteristics
- Mouth: Sozh
  - coordinates: 52°25′44″N 31°03′04″E
- Length: 437 km (272 mi)
- Basin size: 10,900 km^{2} (4,200 sq mi)

Basin features
- Progression: Sozh→ Dnieper→ Dnieper–Bug estuary→ Black Sea

Ramsar Wetland
- Official name: Iput River Floodplain
- Designated: 30 March 2015
- Reference no.: 2262

The Iput, or Iputs (Belarusian: Іпуць, alternative transliteration Ipuć, [iput͡sʲ]; Russian: Ипуть) is a river in Mogilev and Gomel Regions in Belarus and Smolensk and Bryansk Oblasts in Russia. It is a left tributary of the Sozh. The length of the Iput is 437 kilometres (272 mi). The area of its basin is 10,900 square kilometres (4,200 mi^{2}). The Iput freezes over in late November and stays icebound until late March to early April. Its main tributaries are the Voronitsa and Unecha. The towns of Surazh and Dobrush are located on the Iput.

The source of the Iput is in Mogilev Region of Belarus. It flows east and enters Russia, where it makes the border between Shumyachsky and Yershichsky Districts of Smolensk Oblast. Close to the village of Shadoga it departs of the border and flows southeast, flowing through the selo of Yershichi, and flows south downstream of Yershichi. A stretch of the Iput, flowing southwest, makes a border between Smolensk Oblast (Yershichsky District) and Bryansk Oblast (Kletnyansky District). Downstream of the selo of Korsiki the Iput departs south of the border and flows south through Kletnyansky District, accepts the Nadva from the left, crosses the northern part of Mglinsky District and makes the border between Mglinsky and Surazhsky Districts. It further flows southwest through Surazhsky District and the town of Surazh and makes the border between Surazhsky and Klintsovsky Districts, and further downstream between Gordeyevsky and Klintsovsky Districts. Downstream, it crosses the western part of Klintsovsky District, makes a border between Klintsovsky and Novozybkovsky Districts, crosses Novozybkovsky and Zlynkovsky Districts and flows to Belarus. the mouth of the Iput is in the city of Gomel.

A stretch of the Iput 20 kilometres (12 mi) west of Klintsy is a protected birds sanctuary.
