= Surazh, Russia =

Town in Bryansk Oblast, Russia

Surazh Сураж
- Town
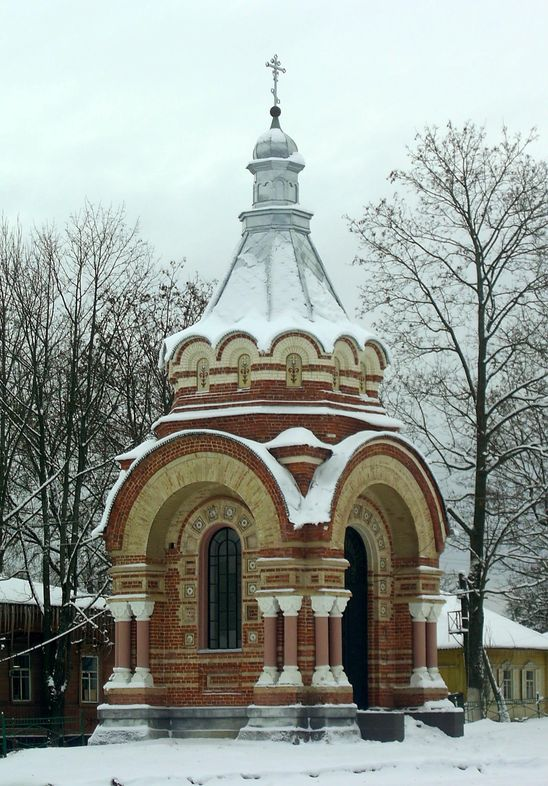
- Small church from 1907

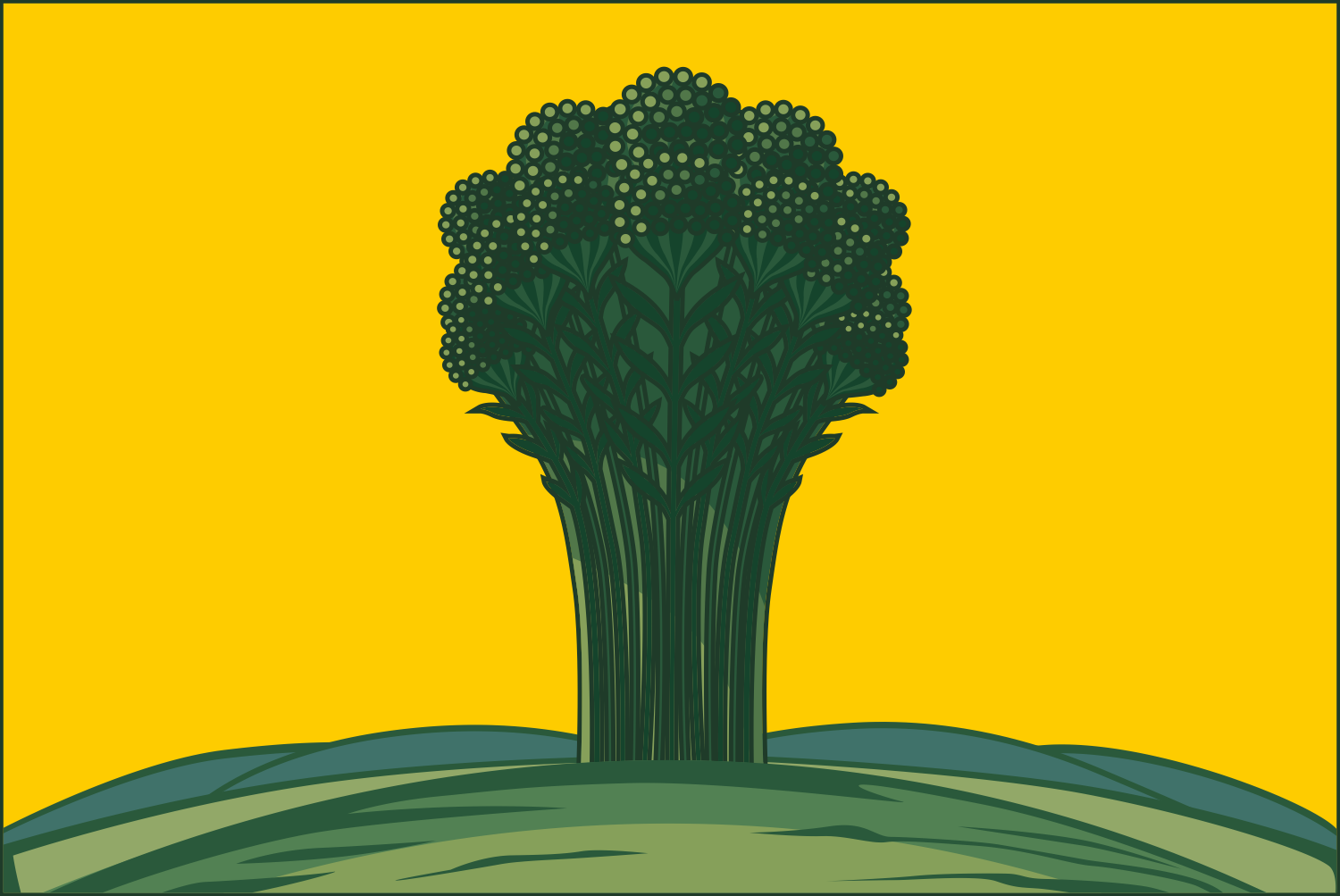
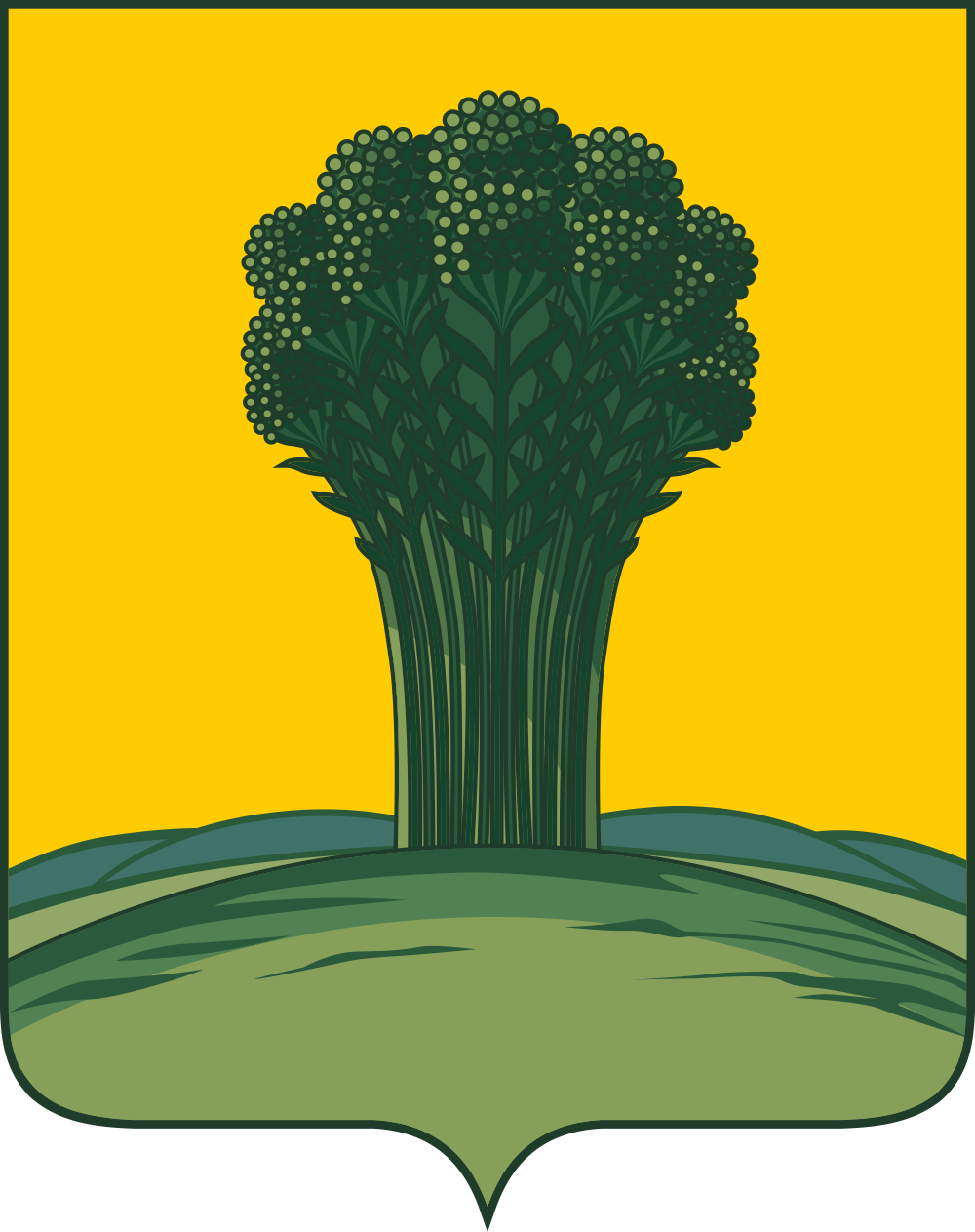
- Flag Coat of arms
- Interactive map of Surazh
- Location of Surazh Surazh (Bryansk Oblast)
- Coordinates: 53°01′N 32°23′E
- Country: Russia
- Federal subject: Bryansk Oblast
- Administrative district: Surazhsky District
- Urban Administrative OkrugSelsoviet: Surazhsky
- First mentioned: 17th century
- Elevation: 160 m (520 ft)

Population (2010 Census)
  - Total: 11,640
  - Estimate (2021): 11,176 (−4%)

Administrative status
  - Capital of: Surazhsky District, Surazhsky Urban Administrative Okrug

Municipal status
  - Municipal district: Surazhsky Municipal District
  - Urban settlement: Surazhskoye Urban Settlement
  - Capital of: Surazhsky Municipal District, Surazhskoye Urban Settlement
- Time zone: UTC+3 (MSK)
- Postal code: 243500
- OKTMO ID: 15654101001
- Website: www.suradmin.ru

Surazh (Russian: Сураж) is a town and the administrative center of Surazhsky District in Bryansk Oblast, Russia, located on the Iput River 177 kilometers (110 mi) southwest of Bryansk, the administrative center of the oblast. Population: 11,176 (2021 census); 11,640 (2010 census); 12,046 (2002 census); 12,559 (1989 Soviet census); 1,599 (1897).

== History ==
The territory formed part of the Smolensk Voivodeship within the Polish–Lithuanian Commonwealth until 1648/1667, and afterwards it was located within the Cossack Hetmanate. It was first mentioned in the 17th century as the village of Surazhichi (Суражичи); later as a sloboda. Since 1781 it has been known as the town of Surazh-na-Iputi (Сураж-на-Ипути), and since 1797—as simply Surazh.

From 1803 it was administratively located in the Chernihiv Governorate. In 1870 there were 82 craftsmen and eight small factories in the town. According to a 1897 census, the town had a population of 4,006, of which 59.9% were Jews, 24.4% were Belarusians, 13.9% were Russians, 0.8% were Ukrainians and 0.6% were Poles.

Jews apparently first settled in Surazh in the first half of the 18th century. In 1897 the Jewish population of Surazh of 2,398 comprised 60 percent of the total population. The Jews of Surazh suffered from pogroms in October 1905 and at the end of winter and in the spring of 1917. In 1918 a pogrom was carried out in Surazh by Red Army soldiers. In 1939 the 2,052 Jews of Surazh comprised about 23 percent of the total population. The town was occupied by the Germans on August 17, 1941. The Jews were forced into a ghetto after which the homes they left were damaged and then burned. In March 1942 all the ghetto inmates were shot near Kislovka village. Surazh was liberated by the Red Army on September 25, 1943.

== Administrative and municipal status ==
Within the framework of administrative divisions, Surazh serves as the administrative center of Surazhsky District. As an administrative division, it is incorporated within Surazhsky District as Surazhsky Urban Administrative Okrug. As a municipal division, Surazhsky Urban Administrative Okrug is incorporated within Surazhsky Municipal District as Surazhskoye Urban Settlement.

== Demographics ==
Ethic composition according to the results of the 2021 Russian census:

Nationality	Number of People	Percent Share
Russians	9575	85.67%
Belarusians	91	0.81%
Ukrainians	56	0.50%
Jews	26	0.23%
Tajiks	23	0.21%
Others and Not Stated	1371	12.28%

== Ecological problems ==
As a result of the Chernobyl disaster on April 26, 1986, part of the territory of Bryansk Oblast has been contaminated with radionuclides (mainly Gordeyevsky, Klimovsky, Klintsovsky, Krasnogorsky, Surazhsky, and Novozybkovsky Districts). In 1999, some 226,000 people lived in areas with the contamination level above 5 Curie/km^{2}, representing approximately 16% of the oblast's population.
