= Sozh =

River in Eastern Europe; tributary of the Dnieper River

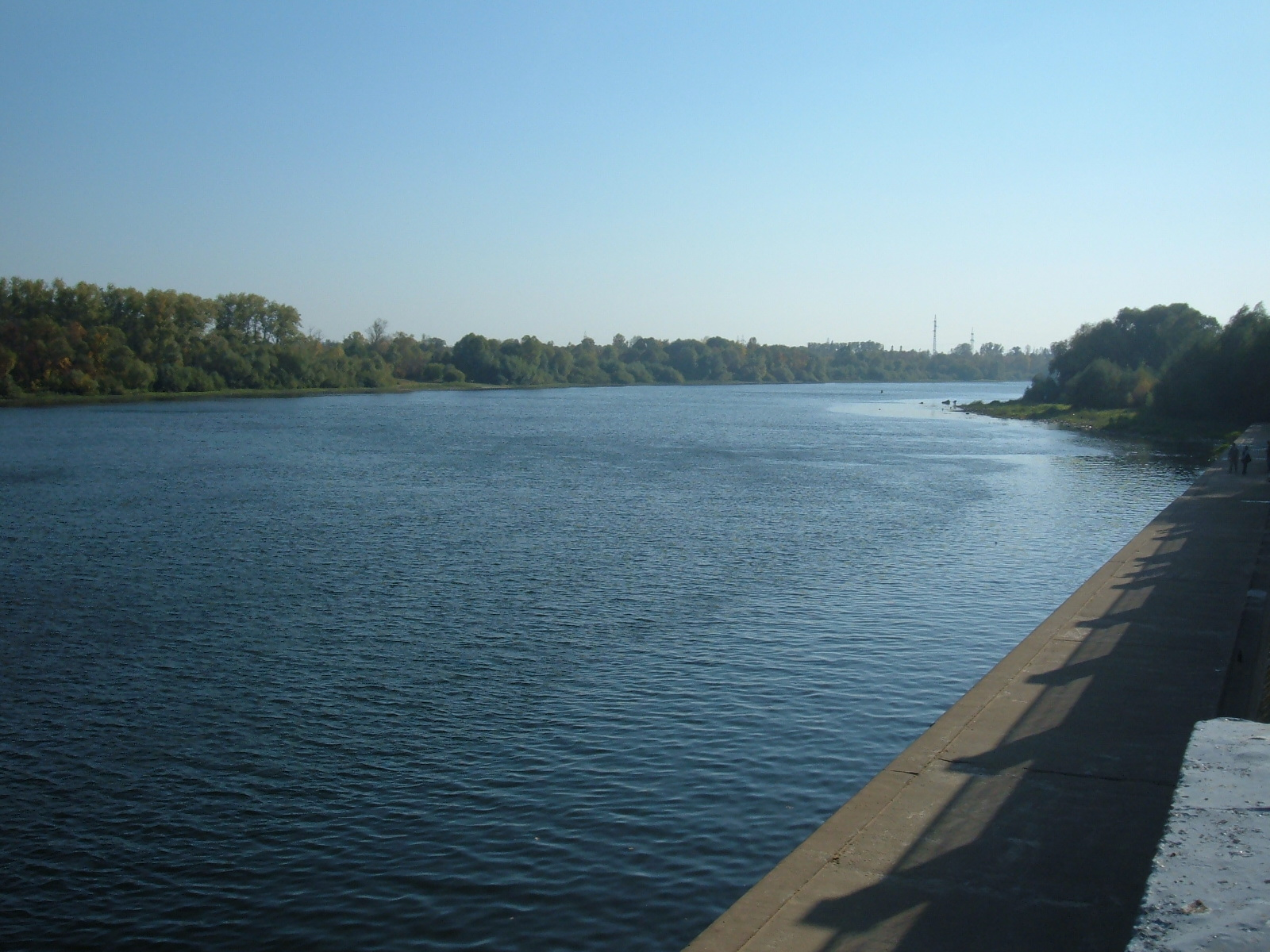
- Sozh in Gomel, Belarus

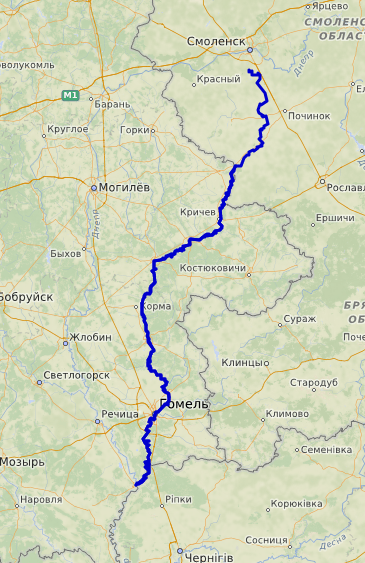
- Native name: Сож (Belarusian); Сож (Russian)

Location
- Country: Belarus, Russia, Ukraine

Physical characteristics
- Source
  - location: Russia
- Mouth
  - location: Dnieper
  - coordinates: 51°56′50″N 30°48′24″E
- Length: 648 km (403 mi)
- Basin size: 42,140 km^{2} (16,270 sq mi)
- Discharge
  - average: In Gomel: 207 m^{3}/s (7,300 cu ft/s)

Basin features
- Progression: Dnieper→ Dnieper–Bug estuary→ Black Sea

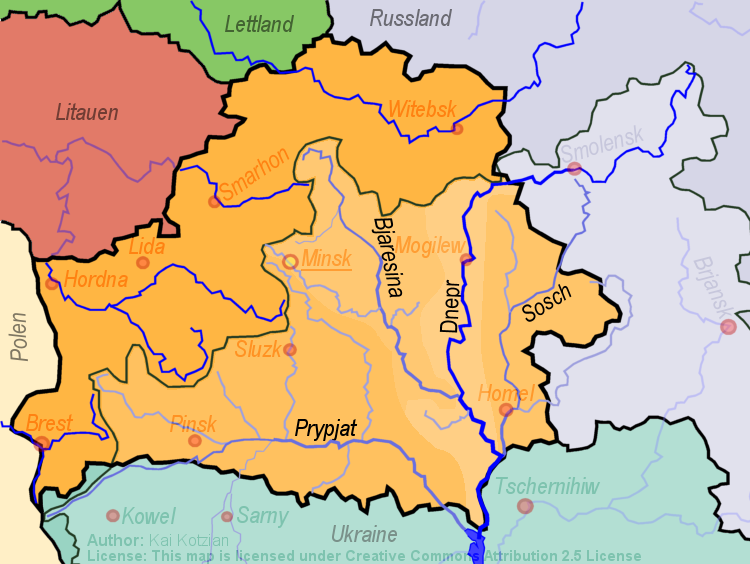
Belarus River Map

The Sozh (Belarusian: Сож, romanized: Sož, IPA: [sɔʐ]; Russian: Сож; Ukrainian: Сож) is a river flowing in Russia, Belarus, and Ukraine. It is a left bank tributary of the Dnieper. The Sozh passes through Gomel, the second largest city in Belarus.

The river is crossed by the Sozh Floating Bridge at Karma and an elegant steel arch at Gomel, which is featured on a Rbls 300 national stamp.

== Etymology ==
The original name was Sozh' (Russian: Сожь), from Old East Slavic Съжь. With the previously suggested Baltic and Finnic etymologies considered unsatisfactory, Vadim Andreevich Zhuchkevich proposed that the name is derived from Old Russian/Old Belarusian sozhzh' (сожжь) 'burned parts of a forest prepared for plowing,' which has parallels to other place names.

== Geography ==
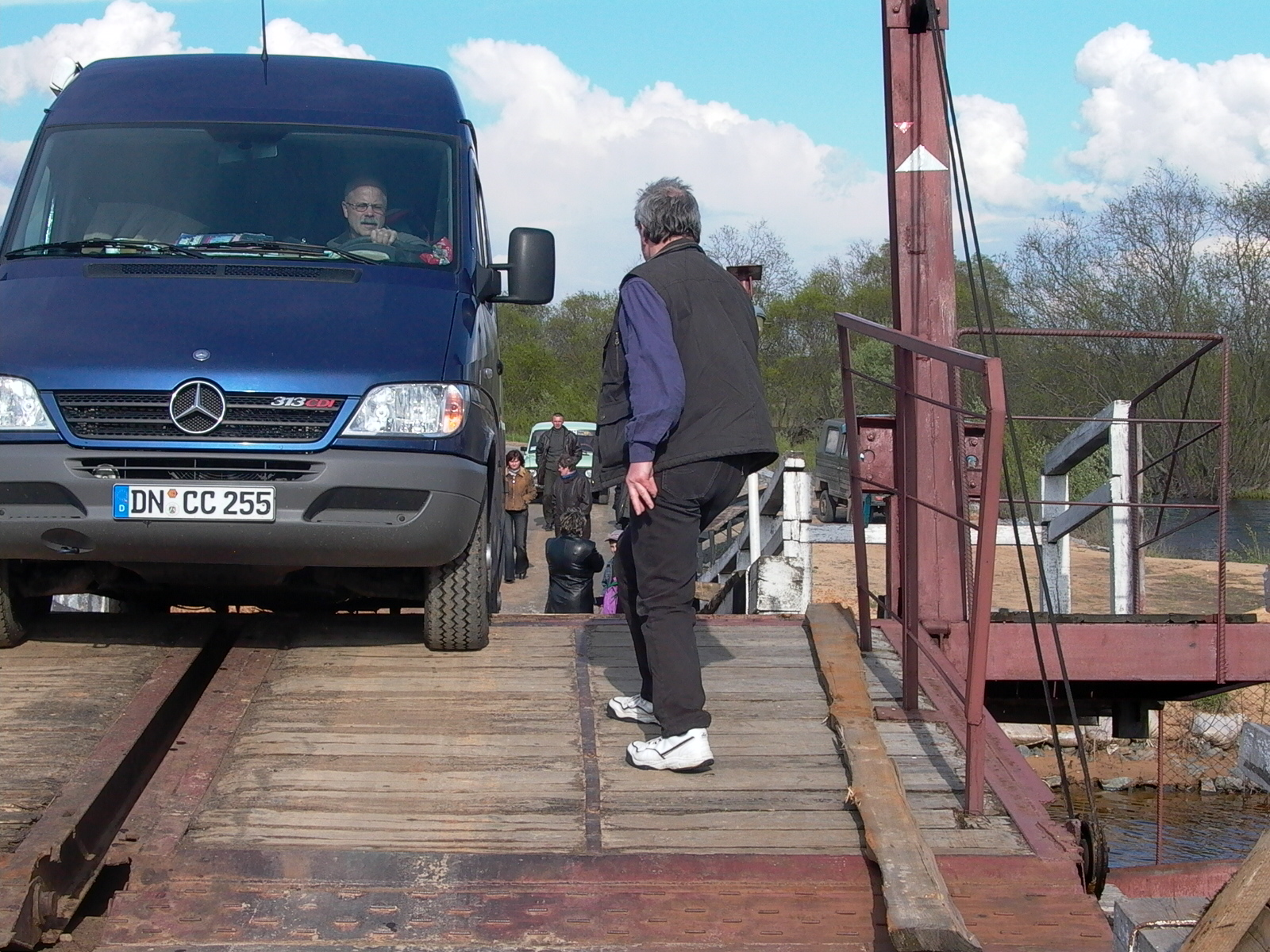
Sozh Floating Bridge crossing the river near Karma, Belarus

The Sozh rises in Russia and is mostly snow-fed. The river freezes over between November and early January. The ice thaws from late March or April. The Vikhra and Pronia, on the right, and the Ostyor, Besed, Iput and Uts on the left are its main tributaries. It is one of the six tributaries longer than 500 km that join the Dnieper – the third longest river in Europe at 2,201 km.

The Sozh has navigational locks in its upper reaches where it is navigable from Krychaw. Timber is floated along the river.

The mouth of the river is 150m broad and swampy. The catchment area of the river is 42,140 square kilometres (16,270 sq mi) along its 648 kilometres (403 mi) length, 21,700 square kilometres (8,400 sq mi) and 493 kilometres (306 mi) within Belarus. The mean discharge recorded at Gomel, 100 kilometres (62 mi) upstream from the mouth, is 207 m^{3}/s.

Important historical towns on the banks of the main river and its tributaries are: Krychaw, Cherykaw, Slawharad, Gomel and Vietka.

In Russia, the Sozh has its source in Smolensky District and flows through Pochinkovsky and Khislavichsky Districts of Smolensk Oblast. The urban-type settlement of Khislavichi is located on the banks of the Sozh. It flows further south, making the border between Khislavichsky and Shumyachsky District of Smolensk Oblast in the east, and Mogilev Region of Belarus in the west.

== History ==
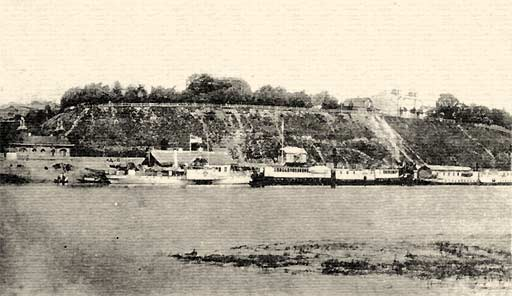
Sozh River in Gomel, 1890s

Many of the cities and towns located in the river valley are part of the river's history of events. Several centuries ago, the East Slavic Radimichi tribal people lived in the Sozh River basin and established the Gomel town. They were involved in agricultural practices, rearing cattle, fishing and honey collection. They were craftsmen, and they were good tradesman as the river provided navigation to the northwestern and southeastern parts of Europe. Gomel, a river port and a railhead, is also known as Homyel or Homiel. It is situated to the southeast of Belarus, and is the capital (administrative centre) of the Gomel Region. It is located on the western bank of the Sozh River, about 300 km from Minsk, and close to the border with Russia and Ukraine. The earliest reported occupation of the town was in 1142, under Kievan Rus. This was followed by Lithuanian control in 1537, then Polish under the Truce of Andrusovo, and later under Russia in 1772. Embankments were built on the banks of the Sozh River . As a result, "a unique nature-architecture ensemble grew on the high picturesque bank of the Sozh River right in the historical center of Gomel." These monuments are credited to the Rumyantsevs and the Paskeviches who were statesmen and military commanders of the Russian Empire. The town is now an important industrial center with a population of about half million. Located in the region of the Chernobyl disaster, Gomel and its surrounding area still suffers from subsisting levels of radiation.

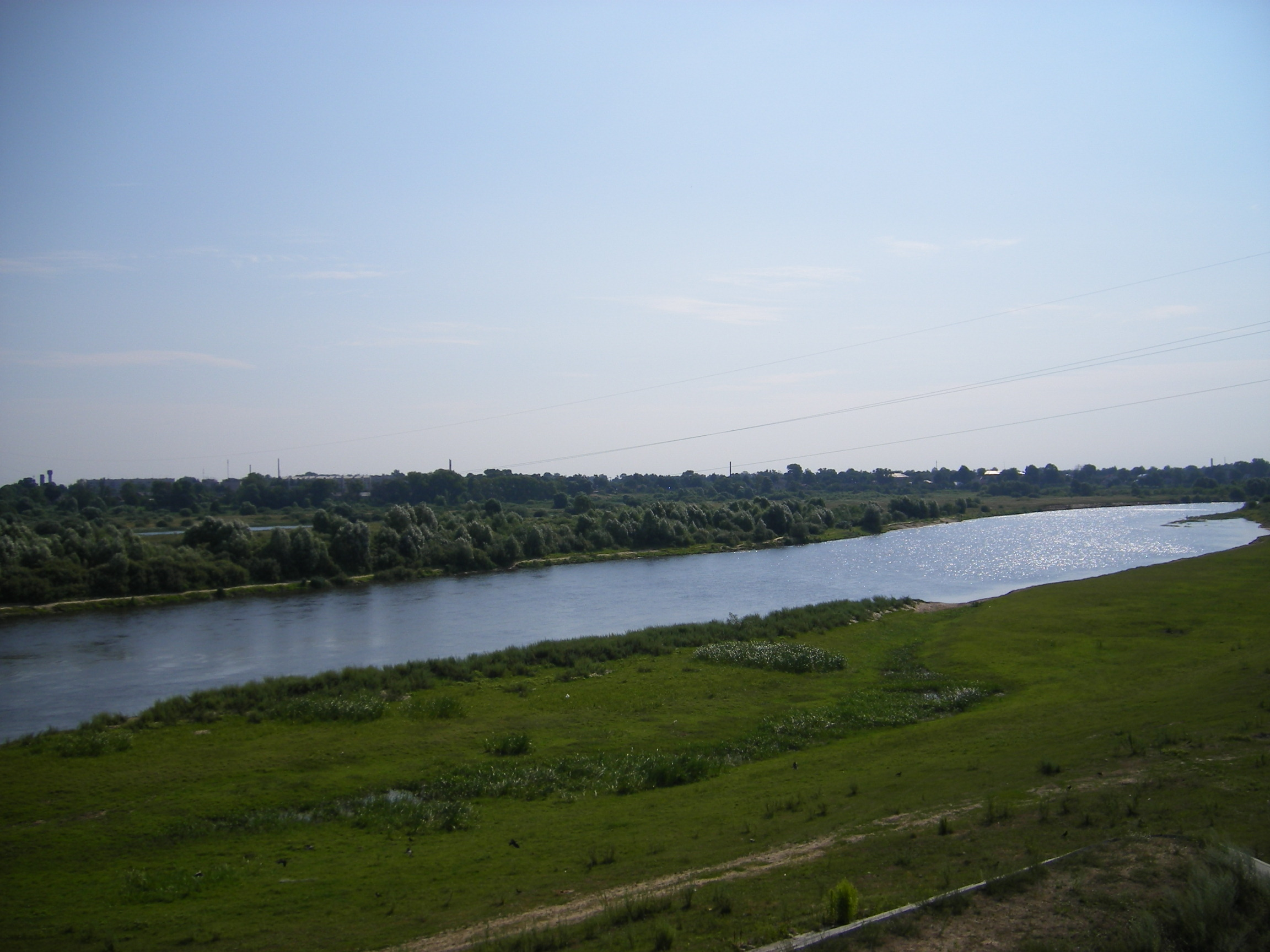
The Sozh River in the Vetka district Khalch

Vetka is a small town, 22 kilometres (14 mi) northeast of Gomel, surrounded by forest and marshy land. It was gutted twice by invading Tsarist forces in 1735 and 1764 which forced the residents to resettle in Eastern Russia. It was renowned for the unique icon style paintings and also wood carvings. It was annexed by the Russian Empire, in 1852. Ships were manufactured here from 1840. During World War II, the town was occupied by the Nazis who killed many of the residents. Vetka, on the Sozh River, is located in an area radioactively polluted as a result of the Chernobyl disaster that occurred on 26 April 1986. High radiation levels due to iodine-131 (20,000 kBq/m^{2}) and strontium-90 (137 kBq/m^{2}) were measured in the soil in the entire Vetka district after the accident. This disaster also resulted in a large-scale relocation of population. A Folk Art Museum, founded in 1987, has exhibits depicting the ancient artefacts, carved wooden entrance doors, manuscripts, traditional costumes and woven rushniki.

Anthropomorphized forms of Russian myths include tales of rivalry between the Sozh, described as wild and turbulent, and the Dnieper, which is described as quiet and leisurely.

=== Archaeological excavations ===
Excavations have unearthed a Palaeolithic boat in the soils of the Sozh River, which has been preserved in the Museum of Ancient Belarusian Culture. The remains of pantheist temples were excavated in the mounds of Tushemlia and Haradok on the Sozh River and dated to the 3rd and 4th centuries. These temples have been inferred as temples erected by Balts for worship of gods and goddesses. Through the end of the 14th century, during the Grand Duchy of Lithuania period, pantheistic religion was prevalent in the region. Another Palaeolithic site, discovered by Konstantin Mikhailovich Polikarpovich, is located on the hill above the bank of Sozh river, in Berdizh village. Remains of woolly mammoth have also been found along the Sozh River.

== Economy ==
Sozh River deposits that extend into Smolensk Oblast providing a supply of ground phosphate to Krychaw and Klimavichy rock plants. Phosphorite is found along the river between Mstislavl and Krichev. Many other construction materials, such as chalk, clay, sand, and gravel are also distributed in the river region as are many mineral water springs. The Sozh is one of the two chief rivers of Mogilev in the Smolensk Oblast where the trade in the early part of the 20th century, involving primarily paper, oil, wire nails, flour, glass, and matches, was predominantly in the hands of the large Jewish population.

== Tributaries ==
Main tributaries: Vihra, Oster, Pronya, Besed, Iput, Khmara, Peschanka.
