= Urzhumovo =

Urzhumovo Уржумово
- Village
- Location within Vologda Oblast Location within Russia
- Coordinates: 60°50′N 46°23′E
- Country: Russia
- Region: Vologda Oblast
- District: Velikoustyugsky District
- Time zone: UTC+3:00

Urzhumovo (Russian: Уржумово) is a rural locality (a village) in Yudinskoye Rural Settlement, Velikoustyugsky District, Vologda Oblast, Russia. The population was 2 as of 2002.

== Geography ==
Urzhumovo is located 12 km northeast of Veliky Ustyug (the district's administrative centre) by road. Sokolovo is the nearest rural locality.
