= Konanovo =

Konanovo Конаново
- Village
- Location within Vologda Oblast Location within Russia
- Coordinates: 60°27′N 46°36′E
- Country: Russia
- Region: Vologda Oblast
- District: Velikoustyugsky District
- Time zone: UTC+3:00

Konanovo (Russian: Конаново) is a rural locality (a village) in Teplogorskoye Rural Settlement, Velikoustyugsky District, Vologda Oblast, Russia. The population was 6 as of 2002.

== Geography ==
Konanovo is located 68 km southeast of Veliky Ustyug (the district's administrative centre) by road. Vatamanovo is the nearest rural locality.
