= Zolotavtsevo =

Zolotavtsevo Золотавцево
- Village
- Location within Vologda Oblast Location within Russia
- Coordinates: 60°47′N 46°15′E
- Country: Russia
- Region: Vologda Oblast
- District: Velikoustyugsky District
- Time zone: UTC+3:00

Zolotavtsevo (Russian: Золотавцево) is a rural locality (a village) in Yudinskoye Rural Settlement, Velikoustyugsky District, Vologda Oblast, Russia. The population was 354 as of 2002. There are 20 streets.

== Geography ==
Zolotavtsevo is located 6 km northwest of Veliky Ustyug (the district's administrative centre) by road. Krasnoye Pole is the nearest rural locality.
