= Korobovo, Velikoustyugsky District, Vologda Oblast =

Korobovo Коробово
- Village
- Location within Vologda Oblast Location within Russia
- Coordinates: 60°47′N 46°21′E
- Country: Russia
- Region: Vologda Oblast
- District: Velikoustyugsky District
- Time zone: UTC+3:00

Korobovo (Russian: Коробово) is a rural locality (a village) in Yudinskoye Rural Settlement, Velikoustyugsky District, Vologda Oblast, Russia. The population was 11 as of 2002.

== Geography ==
Korobovo is located 5 km northeast of Veliky Ustyug (the district's administrative centre) by road. Galkino is the nearest rural locality.
