= Kulnevo =

Kulnevo Кульнево
- Village
- Location within Vologda Oblast Location within Russia
- Coordinates: 60°50′N 46°12′E
- Country: Russia
- Region: Vologda Oblast
- District: Velikoustyugsky District
- Time zone: UTC+3:00
- Website: wrappertube.org

Kulnevo (Russian: Кульнево) is a rural locality (a village) in Yudinskoye Rural Settlement, Velikoustyugsky District, Vologda Oblast, Russia. The population was 3 as of 2002.

== Geography ==
Kulnevo is located 14 km northwest of Veliky Ustyug (the district's administrative centre) by road. Budrino is the nearest rural locality.
