= Odomchino =

Odomchino Одомчино
- Village
- Location within Vologda Oblast Location within Russia
- Coordinates: 60°42′N 46°08′E
- Country: Russia
- Region: Vologda Oblast
- District: Velikoustyugsky District
- Time zone: UTC+3:00

Odomchino (Russian: Одомчино) is a rural locality (a village) in Mardengskoye Rural Settlement, Velikoustyugsky District, Vologda Oblast, Russia. Its population was 5 as of 2002.

== Geography ==
Odomchino is located 19 km southwest of Veliky Ustyug (the district's administrative centre) by road. Gremyachevo is the nearest rural locality.
