= Murdinskaya =

Murdinskaya Мурдинская
- Village
- Location within Vologda Oblast Location within Russia
- Coordinates: 60°24′N 46°18′E
- Country: Russia
- Region: Vologda Oblast
- District: Velikoustyugsky District
- Time zone: UTC+3:00

Murdinskaya (Russian: Мурдинская) is a rural locality (a village) in Verkhneshardengskoye Rural Settlement, Velikoustyugsky District, Vologda Oblast, Russia. The population was 16 as of 2002.

== Geography ==
Murdinskaya is located 47 km south of Veliky Ustyug (the district's administrative centre) by road. Slobodchikovo is the nearest rural locality.
