= Verkhnyaya Kichuga =

Verkhnyaya Kichuga Верхняя Кичуга
- Village
- Location within Vologda Oblast Location within Russia
- Coordinates: 60°37′N 45°41′E
- Country: Russia
- Region: Vologda Oblast
- District: Velikoustyugsky District
- Time zone: UTC+3:00

Verkhnyaya Kichuga (Russian: Верхняя Кичуга) is a rural locality (a village) in Opokskoye Rural Settlement, Velikoustyugsky District, Vologda Oblast, Russia. The population was 87 as of 2002.

== Geography ==
Verkhnyaya Kichuga is located 52 km southwest of Veliky Ustyug (the district's administrative centre) by road. Kichuga is the nearest rural locality.
