= Zagorye, Verkhneshardengskoye Rural Settlement, Velikoustyugsky District, Vologda Oblast =

Zagorye Загорье
- Village
- Location within Vologda Oblast Location within Russia
- Coordinates: 60°23′N 46°26′E
- Country: Russia
- Region: Vologda Oblast
- District: Velikoustyugsky District
- Time zone: UTC+3:00

Zagorye (Russian: Загорье) is a rural locality (a village) in Verkhneshardengskoye Rural Settlement, Velikoustyugsky District, Vologda Oblast, Russia. The population was 1 as of 2002.

== Geography ==
The distance to Veliky Ustyug is 55 km, to Verkhnyaya Shardenga is 8.7 km. Istopnaya is the nearest rural locality.
