= Lodeyka =

Lodeyka Лодейка
- Village
- Location within Vologda Oblast Location within Russia
- Coordinates: 60°41′N 45°45′E
- Country: Russia
- Region: Vologda Oblast
- District: Velikoustyugsky District
- Time zone: UTC+3:00

Lodeyka (Russian: Лодейка) is a rural locality (a village) in and the administrative center of Nizhneyerogodskoye Rural Settlement, Velikoustyugsky District, Vologda Oblast, Russia. The population was 258 as of 2002.

== Geography ==
Lodeyka is located 41 km southwest of Veliky Ustyug (the district's administrative centre) by road. Vypolzovo is the nearest rural locality.
