= Bolshoye Kalikino =

Bolshoye Kalikino Большое Каликино
- Village
- Location within Vologda Oblast Location within Russia
- Coordinates: 60°40′N 45°51′E
- Country: Russia
- Region: Vologda Oblast
- District: Velikoustyugsky District
- Time zone: UTC+3:00

Bolshoye Kalikino (Russian: Большое Каликино) is a rural locality (a village) in Nizhneyerogodskoye Rural Settlement, Velikoustyugsky District, Vologda Oblast, Russia. The population was 5 as of 2002.

== Geography ==
Bolshoye Kalikino is located 34 km southwest of Veliky Ustyug (the district's administrative centre) by road. Krasavino is the nearest rural locality.
