= Verkhnyaya Shardenga =

Verkhnyaya Shardenga Верхняя Шарденьга
- Selo
- Location within Vologda Oblast Location within Russia
- Coordinates: 60°23′N 46°18′E
- Country: Russia
- Region: Vologda Oblast
- District: Velikoustyugsky District
- Time zone: UTC+3:00

Verkhnyaya Shardenga (Russian: Верхняя Шарденьга) is a rural locality (a selo) and the administrative center of Verkhneshardengskoye Rural Settlement, Velikoustyugsky District, Vologda Oblast, Russia. The population was 209 as of 2002.

== Geography ==
Verkhnyaya Shardenga is located 50 km south of Veliky Ustyug (the district's administrative centre) by road. Gorbachevo is the nearest rural locality.
