= Verkhneye Borodkino =

Verkhneye Borodkino Верхнее Бородкино
- Village
- Location within Vologda Oblast Location within Russia
- Coordinates: 60°43′N 46°23′E
- Country: Russia
- Region: Vologda Oblast
- District: Velikoustyugsky District
- Time zone: UTC+3:00

Verkhneye Borodkino (Russian: Верхнее Бородкино) is a rural locality (a village) in Shemogodskoye Rural Settlement, Velikoustyugsky District, Vologda Oblast, Russia. The population was 6 as of 2002.

== Geography ==
Verkhneye Borodkino is located 12 km southeast of Veliky Ustyug (the district's administrative centre) by road. Chernakovo is the nearest rural locality.
