= Parshino, Shemogodskoye Rural Settlement, Velikoustyugsky District, Vologda Oblast =

Parshino Павшино
- Village
- Location within Vologda Oblast Location within Russia
- Coordinates: 60°48′N 46°28′E
- Country: Russia
- Region: Vologda Oblast
- District: Velikoustyugsky District
- Time zone: UTC+3:00

Parshino (Russian: Павшино) is a rural locality (a village) in Shemogodskoye Rural Settlement, Velikoustyugsky District, Vologda Oblast, Russia. The population was 23 as of 2002.

== Geography ==
The distance to Veliky Ustyug is 30 km, to Aristovo is 14 km. Fedorovskoye is the nearest rural locality.
