= Bolshoye Yesiplevo =

Bolshoye Yesiplevo Большое Есиплево
- Village
- Location within Vologda Oblast Location within Russia
- Coordinates: 60°54′N 46°27′E
- Country: Russia
- Region: Vologda Oblast
- District: Velikoustyugsky District
- Time zone: UTC+3:00

Bolshoye Yesiplevo (Russian: Большое Есиплево) is a rural locality (a village) in Krasavinskoye Rural Settlement, Velikoustyugsky District, Vologda Oblast, Russia. The population was 11 as of 2002.

== Geography ==
Bolshoye Yesiplevo is located 20 km northeast of Veliky Ustyug (the district's administrative centre) by road. Vasilyevskoye is the nearest rural locality.
