= Arkhangelskaya Melnitsa =

Arkhangelskaya Melnitsa Архангельская Мельница
- Village
- Location within Vologda Oblast Location within Russia
- Coordinates: 60°27′N 46°30′E
- Country: Russia
- Region: Vologda Oblast
- District: Velikoustyugsky District
- Time zone: UTC+3:00

Arkhangelskaya Melnitsa (Russian: Архангельская Мельница) is a rural locality (a village) in Ust-Alexeyevskoye Rural Settlement, Velikoustyugsky District, Vologda Oblast, Russia. The population was 29 as of 2002.

== Geography ==
Arkhangelskaya Melnitsa is located 56 km southeast of Veliky Ustyug (the district's administrative centre) by road. Gorbishchevo is the nearest rural locality.
