= Minino, Velikoustyugsky District, Vologda Oblast =

Minino Минино
- Village
- Location within Vologda Oblast Location within Russia
- Coordinates: 60°22′N 46°34′E
- Country: Russia
- Region: Vologda Oblast
- District: Velikoustyugsky District
- Time zone: UTC+3:00

Minino (Russian: Минино) is a rural locality (a village) in Verkhnevarzhenskoye Rural Settlement, Velikoustyugsky District, Vologda Oblast, Russia. The population was 3 as of 2002.

== Geography ==
Minino is located 66 km southeast of Veliky Ustyug (the district's administrative centre) by road. Starina is the nearest rural locality.
