= Slobodka, Veliky Ustyug, Velikoustyugsky District, Vologda Oblast =

Slobodka Слободка
- Village
- Location within Vologda Oblast Location within Russia
- Coordinates: 60°47′N 46°16′E
- Country: Russia
- Region: Vologda Oblast
- District: Velikoustyugsky District
- Time zone: UTC+3:00

Slobodka (Russian: Слободка) is a rural locality (a village) in Veliky Ustyug Urban Settlement, Velikoustyugsky District, Vologda Oblast, Russia. The population was 244 as of the 2002 census.

== Geography ==
The distance to Veliky Ustyug is 0.5 km. Popovkino is the nearest rural locality.
