= Bolshoye Yamkino =

Bolshoye Yamkino Большое Ямкино
- Village
- Location within Vologda Oblast Location within Russia
- Coordinates: 60°45′N 46°05′E
- Country: Russia
- Region: Vologda Oblast
- District: Velikoustyugsky District
- Time zone: UTC+3:00

Bolshoye Yamkino (Russian: Большое Ямкино) is a rural locality (a village) in Mardengskoye Rural Settlement, Velikoustyugsky District, Vologda Oblast, Russia. The population was 1 as of 2002.

== Geography ==
Bolshoye Yamkino is located 16 km west of Veliky Ustyug (the district's administrative centre) by road. Polutino is the nearest rural locality.
