= Sotnikovo, Vologda Oblast =

Sotnikovo Сотниково
- Village
- Location within Vologda Oblast Location within Russia
- Coordinates: 60°48′N 46°19′E
- Country: Russia
- Region: Vologda Oblast
- District: Velikoustyugsky District
- Time zone: UTC+3:00

Sotnikovo (Russian: Сотниково) is a rural locality (a village) in Yudinskoye Rural Settlement, Velikoustyugsky District, Vologda Oblast, Russia. The population was 60 as of 2002. There are three streets.

== Geography ==
Sotnikovo is located 6 km northeast of Veliky Ustyug (the district's administrative centre) by road. Korobeynikovo is the nearest rural locality.
