= Parshino, Orlovskoye Rural Settlement, Velikoustyugsky District, Vologda Oblast =

Parshino Павшино
- Village
- Location within Vologda Oblast Location within Russia
- Coordinates: 60°28′N 46°34′E
- Country: Russia
- Region: Vologda Oblast
- District: Velikoustyugsky District
- Time zone: UTC+3:00

Parshino (Russian: Павшино) is a rural locality (a village) in Orlovskoye Rural Settlement, Velikoustyugsky District, Vologda Oblast, Russia. The population was 11 as of 2002.

== Geography ==
The distance to Veliky Ustyug is 72 km, to Chernevo is 4 km. Marmugino is the nearest rural locality.
