= Nizhneye Gribtsovo =

Nizhneye Gribtsovo Нижнее Грибцово
- Village
- Location within Vologda Oblast Location within Russia
- Coordinates: 60°38′N 46°18′E
- Country: Russia
- Region: Vologda Oblast
- District: Velikoustyugsky District
- Time zone: UTC+3:00

Nizhneye Gribtsovo (Russian: Нижнее Грибцово) is a rural locality (a village) in Parfyonovskoye Rural Settlement, Velikoustyugsky District, Vologda Oblast, Russia. The population was 9 as of 2002.

== Geography ==
Nizhneye Gribtsovo is located 19 km south of Veliky Ustyug (the district's administrative centre) by road. Semennikovo is the nearest rural locality.
