= Bolshoye Vostroye =

Bolshoye Vostroye Большое Вострое
- Village
- Location within Vologda Oblast Location within Russia
- Coordinates: 60°39′N 45°42′E
- Country: Russia
- Region: Vologda Oblast
- District: Velikoustyugsky District
- Time zone: UTC+3:00

Bolshoye Vostroye (Russian: Большое Вострое) is a rural locality (a village) in Nizhneyerogodskoye Rural Settlement, Velikoustyugsky District, Vologda Oblast, Russia. The population was 6 as of 2002.

== Geography ==
Bolshoye Vostroye is located 45 km southwest of Veliky Ustyug (the district's administrative centre) by road. Berezovo is the nearest rural locality.
