= Prislon =

Prislon Прислон
- Village
- Location within Vologda Oblast Location within Russia
- Coordinates: 60°40′N 46°49′E
- Country: Russia
- Region: Vologda Oblast
- District: Velikoustyugsky District
- Time zone: UTC+3:00

Prislon (Russian: Прислон) is a rural locality (a village) in Pokrovskoye Rural Settlement, Velikoustyugsky District, Vologda Oblast, Russia. The population was 6 as of 2002.

== Geography ==
The distance to Veliky Ustyug is 39 km, to Ilyinskoye is 9 km. Korolyovo is the nearest rural locality.
