= Navolok, Velikoustyugsky District, Vologda Oblast =

Navolok Наволок
- Village
- Location within Vologda Oblast Location within Russia
- Coordinates: 60°28′N 46°31′E
- Country: Russia
- Region: Vologda Oblast
- District: Velikoustyugsky District
- Time zone: UTC+3:00

Navolok (Russian: Наволок) is a rural locality (a village) in Orlovskoye Rural Settlement, Velikoustyugsky District, Vologda Oblast, Russia. The population was 19 as of 2002.

== Geography ==
Navolok is located 61 km southeast of Veliky Ustyug (the district's administrative centre) by road. Pavlovo is the nearest rural locality.
