= Stryukovo =

Stryukovo Стрюково
- Village
- Location within Vologda Oblast Location within Russia
- Coordinates: 60°21′N 46°37′E
- Country: Russia
- Region: Vologda Oblast
- District: Velikoustyugsky District
- Time zone: UTC+3:00

Stryukovo (Russian: Стрюково) is a rural locality (a village) in Verknevarzhenskoye Rural Settlement, Velikoustyugsky District, Vologda Oblast, Russia. The population was 37 as of 2002.

== Geography ==
Stryukovo is located 71 km southeast of Veliky Ustyug (the district's administrative centre) by road. Makarovo is the nearest rural locality.
