= Teltevo =

Teltevo Тельтево
- Village
- Location within Vologda Oblast Location within Russia
- Coordinates: 60°43′N 46°04′E
- Country: Russia
- Region: Vologda Oblast
- District: Velikoustyugsky District
- Time zone: UTC+3:00

Teltevo (Russian: Тельтево) is a rural locality (a village) in Mardengskoye Rural Settlement, Velikoustyugsky District, Vologda Oblast, Russia. The population was 12 as of 2002.

== Geography ==
Teltevo is located 18 km southwest of Veliky Ustyug (the district's administrative centre) by road. Moseyev Pochinok is the nearest rural locality.
