= Verkhneye Gribtsovo =

Verkhneye Gribtsovo Верхнее Грибцово
- Village
- Location within Vologda Oblast Location within Russia
- Coordinates: 60°39′N 46°18′E
- Country: Russia
- Region: Vologda Oblast
- District: Velikoustyugsky District
- Time zone: UTC+3:00

Verkhneye Gribtsovo (Russian: Верхнее Грибцово) is a rural locality (a village) in Parfyonovskoye Rural Settlement, Velikoustyugsky District, Vologda Oblast, Russia. The population was 18 as of 2002.

== Geography ==
Verkhneye Gribtsovo is located 17 km south of Veliky Ustyug (the district's administrative centre) by road. Karasovo is the nearest rural locality.
