= Klepikovo, Velikoustyugsky District, Vologda Oblast =

Klepikovo Клепиково
- Village
- Location within Vologda Oblast Location within Russia
- Coordinates: 60°56′N 46°26′E
- Country: Russia
- Region: Vologda Oblast
- District: Velikoustyugsky District
- Time zone: UTC+3:00

Klepikovo (Russian: Клепиково) is a rural locality (a village) in Krasavinskoye Rural Settlement, Velikoustyugsky District, Vologda Oblast, Russia. The population was 29 as of 2002.

== Geography ==
Klepikovo is located 25 km northeast of Veliky Ustyug (the district's administrative centre) by road. Krasavino is the nearest rural locality.
