= Sulinskaya =

Sulinskaya Сулинская
- Village
- Location within Vologda Oblast Location within Russia
- Coordinates: 60°45′N 46°20′E
- Country: Russia
- Region: Vologda Oblast
- District: Velikoustyugsky District
- Time zone: UTC+3:00

Sulinskaya (Russian: Сулинская) is a rural locality (a village) in Yudinskoye Rural Settlement, Velikoustyugsky District, Vologda Oblast, Russia. The population was 27 as of 2002.

== Geography ==
Sulinskaya is located 4 km east of Veliky Ustyug (the district's administrative centre) by road. Rogozinino is the nearest rural locality.
