= Kolpakovo, Vologda Oblast =

Kolpakovo Колпаково
- Village
- Location within Vologda Oblast Location within Russia
- Coordinates: 60°49′N 46°25′E
- Country: Russia
- Region: Vologda Oblast
- District: Velikoustyugsky District
- Time zone: UTC+3:00

Kolpakovo (Russian: Колпаково) is a rural locality (a village) in Yudinskoye Rural Settlement, Velikoustyugsky District, Vologda Oblast, Russia. The population was 9 as of 2002.

== Geography ==
Kolpakovo is located 13 km northeast of Veliky Ustyug (the district's administrative centre) by road. Zapan Bobrovnikovo is the nearest rural locality.
