= Novoye Rozhkovo =

Novoye Rozhkovo Новое Рожково
- Village
- Location within Vologda Oblast Location within Russia
- Coordinates: 60°34′N 46°27′E
- Country: Russia
- Region: Vologda Oblast
- District: Velikoustyugsky District
- Time zone: UTC+3:00

Novoye Rozhkovo (Russian: Новое Рожково) is a rural locality (a village) in Parfyonovskoye Rural Settlement, Velikoustyugsky District, Vologda Oblast, Russia. The population was 2 as of 2002.

== Geography ==
Novoye Rozhkovo is located 30 km southeast of Veliky Ustyug (the district's administrative centre) by road. Smolinskaya Vystavka is the nearest rural locality.
