= Sokolovo, Velikoustyugsky District, Vologda Oblast =

Sokolovo Соколово
- Village
- Location within Vologda Oblast Location within Russia
- Coordinates: 60°50′N 46°24′E
- Country: Russia
- Region: Vologda Oblast
- District: Velikoustyugsky District
- Time zone: UTC+3:00

Sokolovo (Russian: Соколово) is a rural locality (a village) in Yudinskoye Rural Settlement, Velikoustyugsky District, Vologda Oblast, Russia. The population was 2 in 2002.

== Geography ==
Sokolovo is located 13 km northeast of Veliky Ustyug (the district's administrative centre) by road. Urzhumovo is the nearest rural locality.
