= Kurdenga =

Kurdenga Курденьга
- Village
- Location within Vologda Oblast Location within Russia
- Coordinates: 60°30′N 46°47′E
- Country: Russia
- Region: Vologda Oblast
- District: Velikoustyugsky District
- Time zone: UTC+3:00

Kurdenga (Russian: Курденьга) is a rural locality (a village) in Orlovskoye Rural Settlement, Velikoustyugsky District, Vologda Oblast, Russia. The population was 19 as of 2002.

== Geography ==
Kurdenga is located 24 km southwest of Veliky Ustyug (the district's administrative centre) by road. Leonovo is the nearest rural locality.
