= Podsosenye, Velikoustyugsky District, Vologda Oblast =

Podsosenye Подсосенье
- Village
- Location within Vologda Oblast Location within Russia
- Coordinates: 60°43′N 46°10′E
- Country: Russia
- Region: Vologda Oblast
- District: Velikoustyugsky District
- Time zone: UTC+3:00

Podsosenye (Russian: Подсосенье) is a rural locality (a village) in Samotovinskoye Rural Settlement, Velikoustyugsky District, Vologda Oblast, Russia. The population was 249 as of 2002.

== Geography ==
Podsosenye is located 10 km southwest of Veliky Ustyug (the district's administrative centre) by road. Chernyatino is the nearest rural locality.
