= Priluki (settlement), Velikoustyugsky District, Vologda Oblast =

Priluki Прилуки
- Settlement
- Location within Vologda Oblast Location within Russia
- Coordinates: 60°35′N 45°26′E
- Country: Russia
- Region: Vologda Oblast
- District: Velikoustyugsky District
- Time zone: UTC+3:00

Priluki (Russian: Прилуки) is a rural locality (a settlement) in Opokskoye Rural Settlement, Velikoustyugsky District, Vologda Oblast, Russia. The population was 24 as of 2002.

== Geography ==
Priluki is located 66 km southwest of Veliky Ustyug (the district's administrative centre) by road. Porog is the nearest rural locality.
