= Mikhninskaya =

Mikhninskaya Михнинская
- Village
- Location within Vologda Oblast Location within Russia
- Coordinates: 60°26′N 46°18′E
- Country: Russia
- Region: Vologda Oblast
- District: Velikoustyugsky District
- Time zone: UTC+3:00

Mikhninskaya (Russian: Михнинская) is a rural locality (a village) in Nizhneshardengskoye Rural Settlement, Velikoustyugsky District, Vologda Oblast, Russia. The population was 8 as of 2002.

== Geography ==
Mikhninskaya is located 43 km south of Veliky Ustyug (the district's administrative centre) by road. Burdukino is the nearest rural locality.
