= Varzhenskaya Zaimka =

Varzhenskaya Zaimka Варженская Заимка
- Village
- Location within Vologda Oblast Location within Russia
- Coordinates: 60°24′N 46°38′E
- Country: Russia
- Region: Vologda Oblast
- District: Velikoustyugsky District
- Time zone: UTC+3:00

Varzhenskaya Zaimka (Russian: Варженская Заимка) is a rural locality (a village) in Teplogorskoye Rural Settlement, Velikoustyugsky District, Vologda Oblast, Russia. The population was 4 as of 2002.

== Geography ==
Varzhenskaya Zaimka is located 65 km southeast of Veliky Ustyug (the district's administrative centre) by road. Derevenka is the nearest rural locality.
