= Pozharovo =

Pozharovo Пожарово
- Village
- Location within Vologda Oblast Location within Russia
- Coordinates: 60°24′N 46°31′E
- Country: Russia
- Region: Vologda Oblast
- District: Velikoustyugsky District
- Time zone: UTC+3:00

Pozharovo (Russian: Пожарово) is a rural locality (a village) in Ust-Alexeyevskoye Rural Settlement, Velikoustyugsky District, Vologda Oblast, Russia. The population was 56 as of 2002.

== Geography ==
Pozharovo is located 62 km southeast of Veliky Ustyug (the district's administrative centre) by road. Yushkovo is the nearest rural locality.
