= Marilovo =

Marilovo Марилово
- Village
- Location within Vologda Oblast Location within Russia
- Coordinates: 60°19′N 46°39′E
- Country: Russia
- Region: Vologda Oblast
- District: Velikoustyugsky District
- Time zone: UTC+3:00

Marilovo (Russian: Марилово) is a rural locality (a village) in Verkhnevarzhenskoye Rural Settlement, Velikoustyugsky District, Vologda Oblast, Russia. The population was 24 as of 2002.

== Geography ==
Marilovo is located 74 km southeast of Veliky Ustyug (the district's administrative centre) by road. Andronovo is the nearest rural locality.
