= Krivaya Beryoza =

Krivaya Beryoza Кривая Берёза
- Village
- Location within Vologda Oblast Location within Russia
- Coordinates: 60°38′N 46°24′E
- Country: Russia
- Region: Vologda Oblast
- District: Velikoustyugsky District
- Time zone: UTC+3:00

Krivaya Beryoza (Russian: Кривая Берёза) is a rural locality (a village) in Parfyonovskoye Rural Settlement, Velikoustyugsky District, Vologda Oblast, Russia. The population was 3 as of 2002.

== Geography ==
Krivaya Beryoza is located 22 km southeast of Veliky Ustyug (the district's administrative centre) by road. Karasovo is the nearest rural locality.
