= Chuchery =

Chuchery Чучеры
- Village
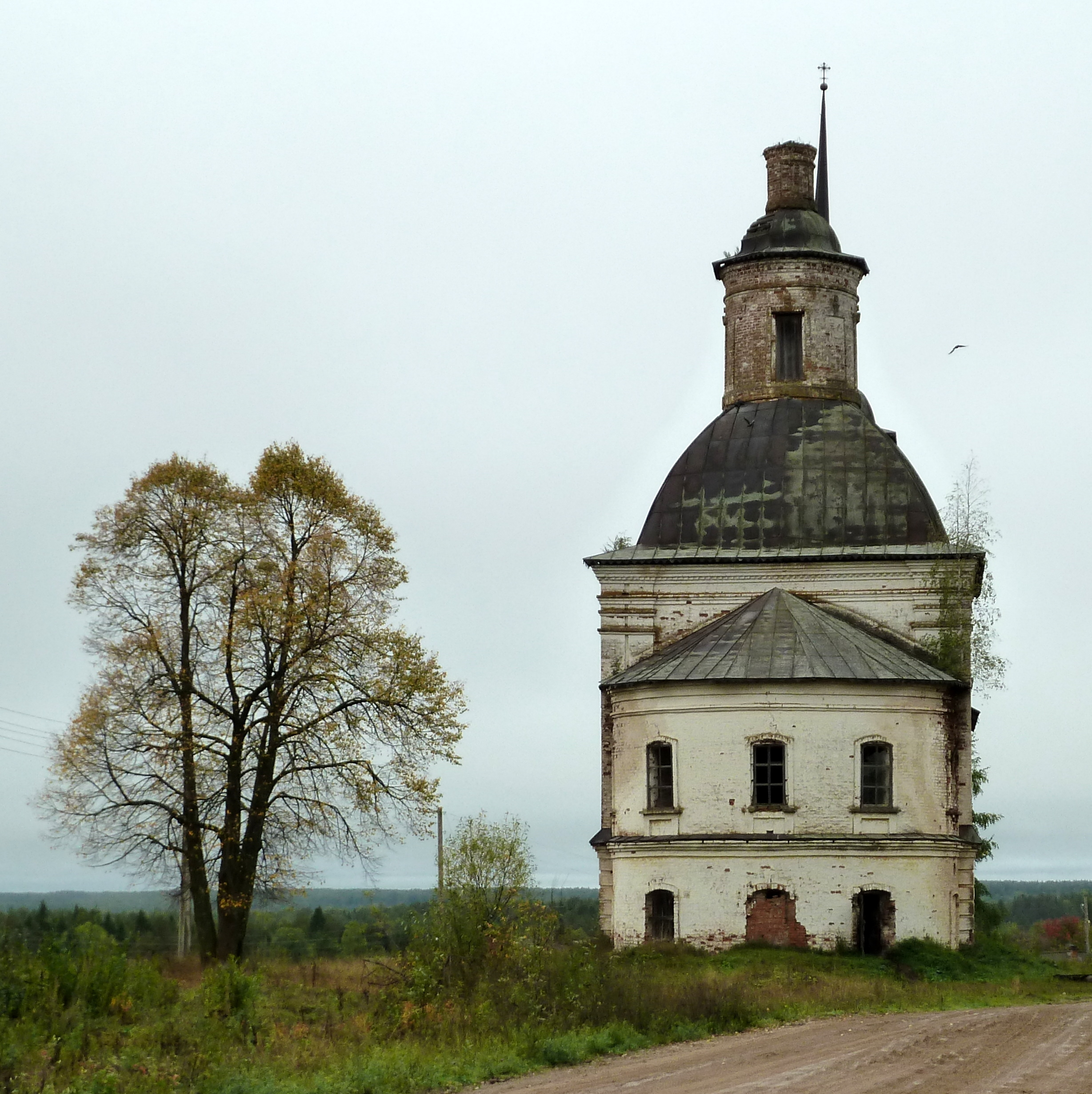
- Chuchery, Veliky Ustyug district, Vologda region

- Location within Vologda Oblast Location within Russia
- Coordinates: 60°38′N 46°36′E
- Country: Russia
- Region: Vologda Oblast
- District: Velikoustyugsky District
- Time zone: UTC+3:00

Chuchery (Russian: Чучеры) is a rural locality (a village) in Pokrovskoye Rural Settlement, Velikoustyugsky District, Vologda Oblast, Russia. The population was 56 as of 2002.

== Geography ==
Chuchery is located 25 km southeast of Veliky Ustyug (the district's administrative centre) by road. Novoselovo is the nearest rural locality.
