= Ishutino =

Ishutino Ишутино
- Village
- Location within Vologda Oblast Location within Russia
- Coordinates: 60°46′N 46°12′E
- Country: Russia
- Region: Vologda Oblast
- District: Velikoustyugsky District
- Time zone: UTC+3:00

Ishutino (Russian: Ишутино) is a rural locality (a village) in Mardengskoye Rural Settlement, Velikoustyugsky District, Vologda Oblast, Russia. The population was 161 as of 2002. There are 18 streets.

== Geography ==
Ishutino is located 8 km northwest of Veliky Ustyug (the district's administrative centre) by road. Vozdvizhenye is the nearest rural locality.
