= Susolovka =

Susolovka Сусоловка
- Settlement
- Location within Vologda Oblast Location within Russia
- Coordinates: 60°48′N 47°03′E
- Country: Russia
- Region: Vologda Oblast
- District: Velikoustyugsky District
- Time zone: UTC+3:00

Susolovka (Russian: Сусоловка) is a rural locality (a settlement) and the administrative center of Susolovskoye Rural Settlement, Velikoustyugsky District, Vologda Oblast, Russia. The population was 910 as of 2002. There are 22 streets.

== Geography ==
Susolovka is located 72 km east of Veliky Ustyug (the district's administrative centre) by road. Black forest is the nearest locality.
