= Myakinnitsyno =

Myakinnitsyno Мякинницыно
- Village
- Location within Vologda Oblast Location within Russia
- Coordinates: 60°20′N 46°38′E
- Country: Russia
- Region: Vologda Oblast
- District: Velikoustyugsky District
- Time zone: UTC+3:00

Myakinnitsyno (Russian: Мякинницыно) is a rural locality (a village) and the administrative center of Verkhnevarzhenskoye Rural Settlement, Velikoustyugsky District, Vologda Oblast, Russia. The population was 256 as of 2002.

== Geography ==
Myakinnitsyno is located 73 km southeast of Veliky Ustyug (the district's administrative centre) by road. Andronovo is the nearest rural locality.
