= Korolyovo, Pokrovskoye Rural Settlement, Velikoustyugsky District, Vologda Oblast =

Korolyovo Королёво
- Village
- Location within Vologda Oblast Location within Russia
- Coordinates: 60°39′N 46°51′E
- Country: Russia
- Region: Vologda Oblast
- District: Velikoustyugsky District
- Time zone: UTC+3:00

Korolyovo (Russian: Королёво) is a rural locality (a village) in Pokrovskoye Rural Settlement, Velikoustyugsky District, Vologda Oblast, Russia. The population was 8 as of 2002.

== Geography ==
The distance to Veliky Ustyug is 42 km, to Ilyinskoye is 12 km. Palema is the nearest rural locality.
