= Ulyanitsa =

Ulyanitsa Ульяница
- Village
- Location within Vologda Oblast Location within Russia
- Coordinates: 60°30′N 46°28′E
- Country: Russia
- Region: Vologda Oblast
- District: Velikoustyugsky District
- Time zone: UTC+3:00

Ulyanitsa (Russian: Ульяница) is a rural locality (a village) in Ust-Alexeyevskoye Rural Settlement, Velikoustyugsky District, Vologda Oblast, Russia. The population was 5 as of 2002.

== Geography ==
Ulyanitsa is located 59 km southeast of Veliky Ustyug (the district's administrative centre) by road. Opalevo is the nearest rural locality.
