= Tomashevo =

Tomashevo Томашево
- Village
- Location within Vologda Oblast Location within Russia
- Coordinates: 60°30′N 46°48′E
- Country: Russia
- Region: Vologda Oblast
- District: Velikoustyugsky District
- Time zone: UTC+3:00

Tomashevo (Russian: Томашево) is a rural locality (a village) in Orlovskoye Rural Settlement, Velikoustyugsky District, Vologda Oblast, Russia. The population was 123 as of 2002.

== Geography ==
Tomashevo is located 80 km southeast of Veliky Ustyug (the district's administrative centre) by road. Kurdenga is the nearest rural locality.
