= Mitikhino =

Mitikhino Митихино
- Village
- Location within Vologda Oblast Location within Russia
- Coordinates: 60°21′N 46°39′E
- Country: Russia
- Region: Vologda Oblast
- District: Velikoustyugsky District
- Time zone: UTC+3:00

Mitikhino (Russian: Митихино) is a rural locality (a village) in Verkhnevarzhenskoye Velikoustyugsky District, Vologda Oblast, Russia. The population was 4 as of 2002.

== Geography ==
Mitikhino is located 73 km southeast of Veliky Ustyug (the district's administrative centre) by road. Myakinnitsyno is the nearest rural locality.
