= Buslayevo =

Buslayevo Буслаево
- Village
- Location within Vologda Oblast Location within Russia
- Coordinates: 60°28′N 46°17′E
- Country: Russia
- Region: Vologda Oblast
- District: Velikoustyugsky District
- Time zone: UTC+3:00

Buslayevo (Russian: Буслаево) is a rural locality (a village) in Nizhneshardengskoye Rural Settlement, Velikoustyugsky District, Vologda Oblast, Russia. The population was 5 as of 2002.

== Geography ==
Buslayevo is located 43 km south of Veliky Ustyug (the district's administrative centre) by road. Isakovo is the nearest rural locality.
