= Smolinskaya Vystavka =

Smolinskaya Vystavka Смолинская Выставка
- Village
- Location within Vologda Oblast Location within Russia
- Coordinates: 60°34′N 46°28′E
- Country: Russia
- Region: Vologda Oblast
- District: Velikoustyugsky District
- Time zone: UTC+3:00

Smolinskaya Vystavka (Russian: Смолинская Выставка) is a rural locality (a village) in Parfyonovskoye Rural Settlement, Velikoustyugsky District, Vologda Oblast, Russia. The population was 29 as of 2002.

== Geography ==
Smolinskaya Vystavka is located 30 km southeast of Veliky Ustyug (the district's administrative centre) by road. Novoye Rozhkovo is the nearest rural locality.
