= Budrino =

Budrino Будрино
- Village
- Location within Vologda Oblast Location within Russia
- Coordinates: 60°50′N 46°12′E
- Country: Russia
- Region: Vologda Oblast
- District: Velikoustyugsky District
- Time zone: UTC+3:00

Budrino (Russian: Будрино) is a rural locality (a village) in Yudinskoye Rural Settlement, Velikoustyugsky District, Vologda Oblast, Russia. The population was 74 as of 2002.

== Geography ==
Budrino is located 13 km northwest of Veliky Ustyug (the district's administrative centre) by road. Kulnevo is the nearest rural locality.
