= Kochurino =

Kochurino Кочурино
- Village
- Location within Vologda Oblast Location within Russia
- Coordinates: 60°23′N 46°33′E
- Country: Russia
- Region: Vologda Oblast
- District: Velikoustyugsky District
- Time zone: UTC+3:00

Kochurino (Russian: Кочурино) is a rural locality (a village) in Ust-Alexeyevskoye Rural Settlement, Velikoustyugsky District, Vologda Oblast, Russia. The population was 5 as of 2002.

== Geography ==
Kochurino is located 64 km southeast of Veliky Ustyug (the district's administrative centre) by road. Voronino is the nearest rural locality.
