= Peganovo =

Peganovo Пеганово
- Village
- Location within Vologda Oblast Location within Russia
- Coordinates: 60°33′N 46°12′E
- Country: Russia
- Region: Vologda Oblast
- District: Velikoustyugsky District
- Time zone: UTC+3:00

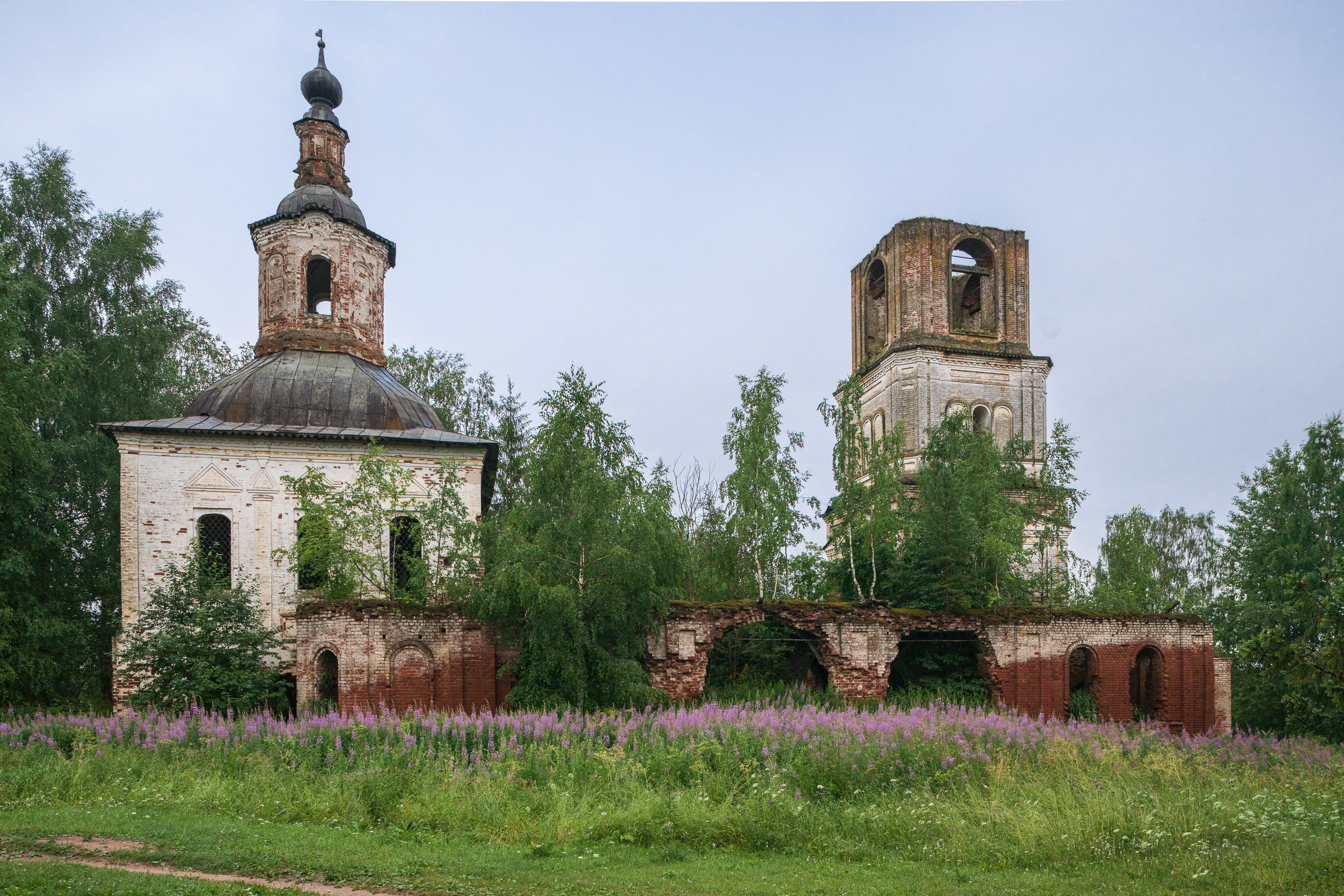
Church of St. Nicholas the Wonderworker: Peganovo, Veliky Ustyug District, Vologda Oblast

Peganovo (Russian: Пеганово) is a rural locality (a village) in Tregubovskoye Rural Settlement, Velikoustyugsky District, Vologda Oblast, Russia. The population was 380 as of 2002. There are 6 streets.

== Geography ==
Peganovo is located 29 km southwest of Veliky Ustyug (the district's administrative centre) by road. Pestovo is the nearest rural locality.
