= Popovkino =

Popovkino Поповкино
- Village
- Location within Vologda Oblast Location within Russia
- Coordinates: 60°46′N 46°15′E
- Country: Russia
- Region: Vologda Oblast
- District: Velikoustyugsky District
- Time zone: UTC+3:00

Popovkino (Russian: Поповкино) is a rural locality (a village) in Samotovinskoye Rural Settlement, Velikoustyugsky District, Vologda Oblast, Russia. The population was 45 as of 2002.

== Geography ==
Popovkino is located 5 km northwest of Veliky Ustyug (the district's administrative centre) by road. Onbovo is the nearest rural locality.
