= Polutino, Vologda Oblast =

Polutino Полутино
- Village
- Location within Vologda Oblast Location within Russia
- Coordinates: 60°44′N 46°06′E
- Country: Russia
- Region: Vologda Oblast
- District: Velikoustyugsky District
- Time zone: UTC+3:00

Polutino (Russian: Полутино) is a rural locality (a village) in Mardengskoye Rural Settlement, Velikoustyugsky District, Vologda Oblast, Russia. The population was 5 as of 2002.

== Geography ==
Polutino is located 17 km west of Veliky Ustyug (the district's administrative centre) by road. Bolshoye Yamkino is the nearest rural locality.
