= Verkhny Zayemkuch =

Verkhny Zayemkuch Верхний Заемкуч
- Village
- Location within Vologda Oblast Location within Russia
- Coordinates: 60°39′N 46°19′E
- Country: Russia
- Region: Vologda Oblast
- District: Velikoustyugsky District
- Time zone: UTC+3:00

Verkhny Zayemkuch (Russian: Верхний Заемкуч) is a rural locality (a village) in Parfyonovskoye Rural Settlement, Velikoustyugsky District, Vologda Oblast, Russia. The population was 8 as of 2002.

== Geography ==
Verkhny Zayemkuch is located 19 km south of Veliky Ustyug (the district's administrative centre) by road. Nizhny Zayemkuch is the nearest rural locality.
