= Zayamzha =

Zayamzha Заямжа
- Village
- Location within Vologda Oblast Location within Russia
- Coordinates: 60°48′N 46°24′E
- Country: Russia
- Region: Vologda Oblast
- District: Velikoustyugsky District
- Time zone: UTC+3:00

Zayamzha (Russian: Заямжа) is a rural locality (a village) in Yudinskoye Rural Settlement, Velikoustyugsky District, Vologda Oblast, Russia. The population was 2 as of 2002.

== Geography ==
Zayamzha is located 10 km northeast of Veliky Ustyug (the district's administrative centre) by road. Paykino is the nearest rural locality.
