= Telyachye =

Village in Vologda Oblast, Russia

Telyachye Телячье
- Village
- Location within Vologda Oblast Location within Russia
- Coordinates: 60°26′N 46°31′E
- Country: Russia
- Region: Vologda Oblast
- District: Velikoustyugsky District
- Time zone: UTC+3:00

Telyachye (Russian: Телячье) is a rural locality (a village) in Ust-Alexeyevskoye Rural Settlement, Velikoustyugsky District, Vologda Oblast, Russia. The population was 6 as of 2002.

== Geography ==
Telyachye is located 57 km southeast of Veliky Ustyug (the district's administrative centre) by road. Arkhangelskaya Melnitsa is the nearest rural locality.
