= Gerasimovo, Velikoustyugsky District, Vologda Oblast =

Gerasimovo Герасимово
- Village
- Location within Vologda Oblast Location within Russia
- Coordinates: 60°32′N 46°12′E
- Country: Russia
- Region: Vologda Oblast
- District: Velikoustyugsky District
- Time zone: UTC+3:00

Gerasimovo (Russian: Герасимово) is a rural locality (a village) in Nizhneshardengskoye Rural Settlement, Velikoustyugsky District, Vologda Oblast, Russia. The population was 2 as of 2002.

== Geography ==
Gerasimovo is located 33 km south of Veliky Ustyug (the district's administrative centre) by road. Pestovo is the nearest rural locality.
