= Shastovo =

Shastovo Шастово
- Village
- Location within Vologda Oblast Location within Russia
- Coordinates: 60°35′N 46°33′E
- Country: Russia
- Region: Vologda Oblast
- District: Velikoustyugsky District
- Time zone: UTC+3:00

Shastovo (Russian: Шастово) is a rural locality (a village) in Parfyonovskoye Rural Settlement, Velikoustyugsky District, Vologda Oblast, Russia. The population was 3 as of 2002.

== Geography ==
Shastovo is located 35 km southeast of Veliky Ustyug (the district's administrative centre) by road. Demidovo is the nearest rural locality.
