= Gora, Velikoustyugsky District, Vologda Oblast =

Gora Гора
- Village
- Location within Vologda Oblast Location within Russia
- Coordinates: 60°20′N 46°16′E
- Country: Russia
- Region: Vologda Oblast
- District: Velikoustyugsky District
- Time zone: UTC+3:00

Gora (Russian: Гора) is a rural locality (a village) in Verkhneshardengskoye Rural Settlement, Velikoustyugsky District, Vologda Oblast, Russia. The population was 6 as of 2002.

== Geography ==
Gora is located 54 km south of Veliky Ustyug (the district's administrative centre) by road. Podvolochye is the nearest rural locality.
