= Pleso, Velikoustyugsky District, Vologda Oblast =

Pleso Плесо
- Village
- Location within Vologda Oblast Location within Russia
- Coordinates: 60°28′N 46°41′E
- Country: Russia
- Region: Vologda Oblast
- District: Velikoustyugsky District
- Time zone: UTC+3:00

Pleso (Russian: Плесо) is a rural locality (a village) in Orlovskoye Rural Settlement, Velikoustyugsky District, Vologda Oblast, Russia. The population was 6 as of 2002.

== Geography ==
Pleso is located 71 km southeast of Veliky Ustyug (the district's administrative centre) by road. Bobykino is the nearest rural locality.
