= Koshovo =

Koshovo Кошово
- Village
- Location within Vologda Oblast Location within Russia
- Coordinates: 60°52′N 46°21′E
- Country: Russia
- Region: Vologda Oblast
- District: Velikoustyugsky District
- Time zone: UTC+3:00

Koshovo (Russian: Кошово) is a rural locality (a village) in Krasavinskoye Rural Settlement, Velikoustyugsky District, Vologda Oblast, Russia. The population was 25 as of 2002.

== Geography ==
Koshovo is located 17 km northeast of Veliky Ustyug (the district's administrative centre) by road. Bushkovo is the nearest rural locality.
