= Konkovo, Vologda Oblast =

Konkovo Конково
- Village
- Location within Vologda Oblast Location within Russia
- Coordinates: 60°34′N 46°30′E
- Country: Russia
- Region: Vologda Oblast
- District: Velikoustyugsky District
- Time zone: UTC+3:00

Konkovo (Russian: Конково) is a rural locality (a village) in Parfyonovskoye Rural Settlement, Velikoustyugsky District, Vologda Oblast, Russia. The population was 21 as of 2002.

== Geography ==
The distance to Veliky Ustyug is 29.5 km, to Karasovo is 18 km. Slobodka is the nearest rural locality.
