= Starina, Velikoustyugsky District, Vologda Oblast =

Starina Старина
- Village
- Location within Vologda Oblast Location within Russia
- Coordinates: 60°21′N 46°34′E
- Country: Russia
- Region: Vologda Oblast
- District: Velikoustyugsky District
- Time zone: UTC+3:00

Starina (Russian: Старина) is a rural locality (a village) in Verkhnevarzhenskoye Rural Settlement, Velikoustyugsky District, Vologda Oblast, Russia. The population was 2 as of 2002.

== Geography ==
Starina is located 67 km southeast of Veliky Ustyug (the district's administrative centre) by road. Minino is the nearest rural locality.
