= Birichevo =

Birichevo Биричево
- Village
- Location within Vologda Oblast Location within Russia
- Coordinates: 60°29′N 46°15′E
- Country: Russia
- Region: Vologda Oblast
- District: Velikoustyugsky District
- Time zone: UTC+3:00

Birichevo (Russian: Биричево) is a rural locality (a village) in Nizhneshardengskoye Rural Settlement, Velikoustyugsky District, Vologda Oblast, Russia. The population was 7 as of 2002.

== Geography ==
The distance to Veliky Ustyug is 33.5 km (20.8 mi), to Peganovo is 8.5 km (5.3 mi). Isakovo is the nearest rural locality.
