= Yednovo =

Yednovo Едново
- Village
- Location within Vologda Oblast Location within Russia
- Coordinates: 60°50′N 46°31′E
- Country: Russia
- Region: Vologda Oblast
- District: Velikoustyugsky District
- Time zone: UTC+3:00

Yednovo (Russian: Едново) is a rural locality (a village) in Shemogodskoye Velikoustyugsky District, Vologda Oblast, Russia. The population was 10 as of 2002.

== Geography ==
Yednovo is located 31 km northeast of Veliky Ustyug (the district's administrative centre) by road. Balagurovo is the nearest rural locality.
