= Birichevo, Pokrovskoye Rural Settlement, Velikoustyugsky District, Vologda Oblast =

Birichevo Биричево
- Village
- Location within Vologda Oblast Location within Russia
- Coordinates: 60°36′N 46°50′E
- Country: Russia
- Region: Vologda Oblast
- District: Velikoustyugsky District
- Time zone: UTC+3:00

Birichevo (Russian: Биричево) is a rural locality (a village) in Pokrovskoye Rural Settlement, Velikoustyugsky District, Vologda Oblast, Russia. The population was 2 as of 2002.

== Geography ==
The distance to Veliky Ustyug is 57 km, to Ilyinskoye is 5 km. Martishchevo is the nearest rural locality.
