= Savino, Velikoustyugsky District, Vologda Oblast =

Savino Савино
- Village
- Location within Vologda Oblast Location within Russia
- Coordinates: 60°51′N 46°11′E
- Country: Russia
- Region: Vologda Oblast
- District: Velikoustyugsky District
- Time zone: UTC+3:00

Savino (Russian: Савино) is a rural locality (a village) in Yudinskoye Rural Settlement, Velikoustyugsky District, Vologda Oblast, Russia. The population was 1 as of 2002.

== Geography ==
The distance to Veliky Ustyug is 16 km, to Yudino is 15 km. Knyaginino is the nearest rural locality.
