= Barsukovo, Velikoustyugsky District, Vologda Oblast =

Barsukovo Барсуково
- Village
- Location within Vologda Oblast Location within Russia
- Coordinates: 60°44′N 46°17′E
- Country: Russia
- Region: Vologda Oblast
- District: Velikoustyugsky District
- Time zone: UTC+3:00

Barsukovo (Russian: Барсуково) is a rural locality (a village) in Tregubovskoye Rural Settlement, Velikoustyugsky District, Vologda Oblast, Russia. The population was 33 as of 2002.

== Geography ==
Barsukovo is located 11 km south of Veliky Ustyug (the district's administrative centre) by road. Pestovo is the nearest rural locality.
