= Yezekiyevo =

Yezekiyevo Езекиево
- Village
- Location within Vologda Oblast Location within Russia
- Coordinates: 60°53′N 46°09′E
- Country: Russia
- Region: Vologda Oblast
- District: Velikoustyugsky District
- Time zone: UTC+3:00

Yezekiyevo (Russian: Езекиево) is a rural locality (a village) in Yudinskoye Rural Settlement, Velikoustyugsky District, Vologda Oblast, Russia. The population was 1 as of 2002.

== Geography ==
Yezekiyevo is located 19 km northwest of Veliky Ustyug (the district's administrative centre) by road. Kuznetsovo is the nearest rural locality.
