= Poldarsa =

Poldarsa Полдарса
- Village
- Location within Vologda Oblast Location within Russia
- Coordinates: 60°35′N 45°23′E
- Country: Russia
- Region: Vologda Oblast
- District: Velikoustyugsky District
- Time zone: UTC+3:00

Poldarsa (Russian: Полдарса) is a rural locality (a village) in Opokskoye Rural Settlement, Velikoustyugsky District, Vologda Oblast, Russia. The population was 76 as of 2002.

== Geography ==
Poldarsa is located 65 km southwest of Veliky Ustyug (the district's administrative centre) by road. Poldarsa (settlement) is the nearest rural locality.
