= Musino, Velikoustyugsky District, Vologda Oblast =

Musino Мусино
- Village
- Location within Vologda Oblast Location within Russia
- Coordinates: 60°42′N 46°01′E
- Country: Russia
- Region: Vologda Oblast
- District: Velikoustyugsky District
- Time zone: UTC+3:00

Musino (Russian: Мусино) is a rural locality (a village) in Mardengskoye Rural Settlement, Velikoustyugsky District, Vologda Oblast, Russia. The population was 4 as of 2002.

== Geography ==
Musino is located 22 km southwest of Veliky Ustyug (the district's administrative centre) by road. Mardenga is the nearest rural locality.
