= Gorka-Managorskaya =

Gorka-Managorskaya Горка-Манагорская
- Village
- Location within Vologda Oblast Location within Russia
- Coordinates: 60°40′N 46°04′E
- Country: Russia
- Region: Vologda Oblast
- District: Velikoustyugsky District
- Time zone: UTC+3:00

Gorka-Managorskaya (Russian: Горка-Манагорская) is a rural locality (a village) in Samotovinskoye Rural Settlement, Velikoustyugsky District, Vologda Oblast, Russia. The population was 7 as of 2002.

== Geography ==
Gorka-Managorskaya is located 22 km southwest of Veliky Ustyug (the district's administrative centre) by road. Leonovo is the nearest rural locality.
