= Bereznikovo =

Bereznikovo Березниково
- Village
- Location within Vologda Oblast Location within Russia
- Coordinates: 60°57′N 46°30′E
- Country: Russia
- Region: Vologda Oblast
- District: Velikoustyugsky District
- Time zone: UTC+3:00

Bereznikovo (Russian: Березниково) is a rural locality (a village) in Krasavinskoye Rural Settlement, Velikoustyugsky District, Vologda Oblast, Russia. The population was 8 as of 2002.

== Geography ==
Bereznikovo is located 27 km northeast of Veliky Ustyug (the district's administrative centre) by road. Krasavino is the nearest rural locality.
