= Slizovitsa =

Slizovitsa Слизовица
- Village
- Location within Vologda Oblast Location within Russia
- Coordinates: 60°26′N 46°46′E
- Country: Russia
- Region: Vologda Oblast
- District: Velikoustyugsky District
- Time zone: UTC+3:00

Slizovitsa (Russian: Слизовица) is a rural locality (a village) in Teplogorskoye Rural Settlement, Velikoustyugsky District, Vologda Oblast, Russia. The population was 30 as of 2002.

== Geography ==
Slizovitsa is located 73 km southeast of Veliky Ustyug (the district's administrative centre) by road. Votchevo is the nearest rural locality.
