= Orlovo, Velikoustyugsky District, Vologda Oblast =

Orlovo Орлово
- Selo
- Location within Vologda Oblast Location within Russia
- Coordinates: 60°29′N 46°36′E
- Country: Russia
- Region: Vologda Oblast
- District: Velikoustyugsky District
- Time zone: UTC+3:00

Orlovo (Russian: Орлово) is a rural locality (a selo) in Orlovskoye Rural Settlement, Velikoustyugsky District, Vologda Oblast, Russia. The population was 11 as of 2002.

== Geography ==
Orlovo is located 65 km southeast of Veliky Ustyug (the district's administrative centre) by road. Chernevo is the nearest rural locality.
