= Penye =

Penye Пенье
- Village
- Location within Vologda Oblast Location within Russia
- Coordinates: 60°49′N 46°31′E
- Country: Russia
- Region: Vologda Oblast
- District: Velikoustyugsky District
- Time zone: UTC+3:00

Penye (Russian: Пенье) is a rural locality (a village) in Shemogodskoye Rural Settlement, Velikoustyugsky District, Vologda Oblast, Russia. The population was 6 as of 2002. There are 6 streets.

== Geography ==
The distance to Veliky Ustyug is 31 km, to Aristovo is 15 km. Podberezye is the nearest rural locality.
