= Gorbishchevo =

Gorbishchevo Горбищево
- Village
- Location within Vologda Oblast Location within Russia
- Coordinates: 60°27′N 46°30′E
- Country: Russia
- Region: Vologda Oblast
- District: Velikoustyugsky District
- Time zone: UTC+3:00

Gorbishchevo (Russian: Горбищево) is a rural locality (a village) in Ust-Alexeyevskoye Rural Settlement, Velikoustyugsky District, Vologda Oblast, Russia. The population was 3 as of 2002.

== Geography ==
Gorbishchevo is located 56 km southeast of Veliky Ustyug (the district's administrative centre) by road. Arkhangelskaya Melnitsa is the nearest rural locality.
