= Kuzminskoye, Velikoustyugsky District, Vologda Oblast =

Kuzminskoye Кузьминское
- Village
- Location within Vologda Oblast Location within Russia
- Coordinates: 60°35′N 46°30′E
- Country: Russia
- Region: Vologda Oblast
- District: Velikoustyugsky District
- Time zone: UTC+3:00

Kuzminskoye (Russian: Кузьминское) is a rural locality (a village) in Parfyonovskoye Rural Settlement, Velikoustyugsky District, Vologda Oblast, Russia. The population was 4 as of 2002.

== Geography ==
Kuzminskoye is located 34 km southeast of Veliky Ustyug (the district's administrative centre) by road. Kurakino is the nearest rural locality.
