= Striga, Vologda Oblast =

Striga Стрига
- Settlement
- Location within Vologda Oblast Location within Russia
- Coordinates: 60°47′N 46°20′E
- Country: Russia
- Region: Vologda Oblast
- District: Velikoustyugsky District
- Time zone: UTC+3:00

Striga (Russian: Стрига) is a rural locality (a settlement) in Yudinskoye Rural Settlement, Velikoustyugsky District, Vologda Oblast, Russia. The population was 423 as of 2002. There are 6 streets.

== Geography ==
Striga is located 5 km northeast of Veliky Ustyug (the district's administrative centre) by road. Nikulino is the nearest rural locality.
