= Sludka, Velikoustyugsky District, Vologda Oblast =

Sludka Слудка
- Village
- Location within Vologda Oblast Location within Russia
- Coordinates: 60°33′N 46°26′E
- Country: Russia
- Region: Vologda Oblast
- District: Velikoustyugsky District
- Time zone: UTC+3:00

Sludka (Russian: Слудка) is a rural locality (a village) in Ust-Alexeyevskoye Rural Settlement, Velikoustyugsky District, Vologda Oblast, Russia. The population was 4 as of 2002.

== Geography ==
Sludka is located 67 km southeast of Veliky Ustyug (the district's administrative centre) by road. Gavrino is the nearest rural locality.
