= Kasyanka =

Kasyanka Касьянка
- Village
- Location within Vologda Oblast Location within Russia
- Coordinates: 60°19′N 46°18′E
- Country: Russia
- Region: Vologda Oblast
- District: Velikoustyugsky District
- Time zone: UTC+3:00

Kasyanka (Russian: Касьянка) is a rural locality (a village) in Verkhneshardenskoye Rural Settlement, Velikoustyugsky District, Vologda Oblast, Russia. The population was 3 as of 2002.

== Geography ==
Kasyanka is located 57 km south of Veliky Ustyug (the district's administrative centre) by road. Gora is the nearest rural locality.
