= Belaya, Vologda Oblast =

Belaya Белая
- Village
- Location within Vologda Oblast Location within Russia
- Coordinates: 60°35′N 45°22′E
- Country: Russia
- Region: Vologda Oblast
- District: Velikoustyugsky District
- Time zone: UTC+3:00

Belaya (Russian: Белая) is a rural locality (a village) in Opokskoye Rural Settlement, Velikoustyugsky District, Vologda Oblast, Russia. The population was 52 as of 2002.

== Geography ==
Belaya is located 121 km northwest of Veliky Ustyug (the district's administrative centre) by road. Sukhonsky is the nearest rural locality.
