= Sakovo =

Sakovo Саково
- Village
- Location within Vologda Oblast Location within Russia
- Coordinates: 60°26′N 46°42′E
- Country: Russia
- Region: Vologda Oblast
- District: Velikoustyugsky District
- Time zone: UTC+3:00

Sakovo (Russian: Саково) is a rural locality (a village) in Teplogorskoye Rural Settlement, Velikoustyugsky District, Vologda Oblast, Russia. The population was 3 as of 2002.

== Geography ==
Sakovo is located 68 km southeast of Veliky Ustyug (the district's administrative centre) by road. Teplogorye is the nearest rural locality.
