= Ilatovskaya =

Ilatovskaya Илатовская
- Village
- Location within Vologda Oblast Location within Russia
- Coordinates: 60°57′N 45°27′E
- Country: Russia
- Region: Vologda Oblast
- District: Velikoustyugsky District
- Time zone: UTC+3:00

Ilatovskaya (Russian: Илатовская) is a rural locality (a village) in Lomovatskoye Rural Settlement, Velikoustyugsky District, Vologda Oblast, Russia. The population was 55 as of 2002.

== Geography ==
Ilatovskaya is located 89 km northwest of Veliky Ustyug (the district's administrative centre) by road. Pikhtovo is the nearest rural locality.
