= Polutovo =

Polutovo Полутово
- Village
- Location within Vologda Oblast Location within Russia
- Coordinates: 60°52′N 46°25′E
- Country: Russia
- Region: Vologda Oblast
- District: Velikoustyugsky District
- Time zone: UTC+3:00

Polutovo (Russian: Полутово) is a rural locality (a village) in Krasavinskoye Rural Settlement, Velikoustyugsky District, Vologda Oblast, Russia. The population was 260 as of 2002. There are 10 streets.

== Geography ==
Polutovo is located 18 km northeast of Veliky Ustyug (the district's administrative centre) by road. Bushkovo is the nearest rural locality.
