= Antushevo, Velikoustyugsky District, Vologda Oblast =

Antushevo Антушево
- Village
- Location within Vologda Oblast Location within Russia
- Coordinates: 60°21′N 46°35′E
- Country: Russia
- Region: Vologda Oblast
- District: Velikoustyugsky District
- Time zone: UTC+3:00

Antushevo (Russian: Антушево) is a rural locality (a village) in Verkhnevarzhenskoye Rural Settlement, Velikoustyugsky District, Vologda Oblast, Russia. The population was 1 as of 2002.

== Geography ==
Antushevo is located 68 km southeast of Veliky Ustyug (the district's administrative centre) by road. Starina is the nearest rural locality.
