= Parfyonovo, Velikoustyugsky District, Vologda Oblast =

Parfyonovo Парфёново
- Village
- Location within Vologda Oblast Location within Russia
- Coordinates: 60°38′N 46°18′E
- Country: Russia
- Region: Vologda Oblast
- District: Velikoustyugsky District
- Time zone: UTC+3:00

Parfyonovo (Russian: Парфёново) is a rural locality (a village) in Parfyonovskoye Rural Settlement, Velikoustyugsky District, Vologda Oblast, Russia. The population was 12 as of 2002.

== Geography ==
Parfyonovo is located 20 km south of Veliky Ustyug (the district's administrative centre) by road. Nizhneye Gribtsovo is the nearest rural locality.
