= Pikhtovo =

Pikhtovo Пихтово
- Settlement
- Location within Vologda Oblast Location within Russia
- Coordinates: 60°58′N 45°23′E
- Country: Russia
- Region: Vologda Oblast
- District: Velikoustyugsky District
- Time zone: UTC+3:00

Pikhtovo (Russian: Пихтово) is a rural locality (a settlement) in Lomovatskoye Rural Settlement, Velikoustyugsky District, Vologda Oblast, Russia. The population was 91 as of 2002.

== Geography ==
Pikhtovo is located 93 km northwest of Veliky Ustyug (the district's administrative centre) by road. Ilatovskaya is the nearest rural locality.
