= Rukavishnikovo =

Rukavishnikovo Рукавишниково
- Village
- Location within Vologda Oblast Location within Russia
- Coordinates: 60°43′N 46°23′E
- Country: Russia
- Region: Vologda Oblast
- District: Velikoustyugsky District
- Time zone: UTC+3:00

Rukavishnikovo (Russian: Рукавишниково) is a rural locality (a village) in Shemgogodskoye Rural Settlement, Velikoustyugsky District, Vologda Oblast, Russia. The population was 43 as of 2002.

== Geography ==
Rukavishnikovo is located 10 km southeast of Veliky Ustyug (the district's administrative centre) by road. Kopylovo is the nearest rural locality.
