= Khimzavod =

Khimzavod Химзавод
- Settlement
- Location within Vologda Oblast Location within Russia
- Coordinates: 60°47′N 46°57′E
- Country: Russia
- Region: Vologda Oblast
- District: Velikoustyugsky District
- Time zone: UTC+3:00

Khimzavod (Russian: Химзавод) is a rural locality (a settlement) in Susolovskoye Rural Settlement, Velikoustyugsky District, Vologda Oblast, Russia. The population was 30 as of 2002.

== Geography ==
Khimzavod is located 66 km east of Veliky Ustyug (the district's administrative centre) by road. Severny is the nearest rural locality.
