= Konshevo =

Konshevo Коншево
- Village
- Location within Vologda Oblast Location within Russia
- Coordinates: 60°46′N 46°21′E
- Country: Russia
- Region: Vologda Oblast
- District: Velikoustyugsky District
- Time zone: UTC+3:00

Konshevo (Russian: Коншево) is a rural locality (a village) in Yudinskoye Rural Settlement, Velikoustyugsky District, Vologda Oblast, Russia. The population was 2 as of 2002.

== Geography ==
Konshevo is located 5 km northeast of Veliky Ustyug (the district's administrative centre) by road. Dudino is the nearest rural locality.
