= Skornyakovo =

Skornyakovo Скорняково
- Village
- Location within Vologda Oblast Location within Russia
- Coordinates: 60°56′N 46°29′E
- Country: Russia
- Region: Vologda Oblast
- District: Velikoustyugsky District
- Time zone: UTC+3:00

Skornyakovo (Russian: Скорняково) is a rural locality (a village) in Krasavinskoye Rural Settlement, Velikoustyugsky District, Vologda Oblast, Russia. The population was 52 as of 2002.

== Geography ==
Skornyakovo is located 27 km northeast of Veliky Ustyug (the district's administrative centre) by road. Bereznikovo is the nearest rural locality.
