= Nizhnyaya Kichuga =

Nizhnyaya Kichuga Нижняя Кичуга
- Village
- Location within Vologda Oblast Location within Russia
- Coordinates: 60°37′N 45°42′E
- Country: Russia
- Region: Vologda Oblast
- District: Velikoustyugsky District
- Time zone: UTC+3:00

Nizhnyaya Kichuga (Russian: Нижняя Кичуга) is a rural locality (a village) in Strelenskoye Rural Settlement, Velikoustyugsky District, Vologda Oblast, Russia. The population was 2 as of 2002.

== Geography ==
Nizhnyaya Kichuga is located 52 km southwest of Veliky Ustyug (the district's administrative centre) by road. Verkhnyaya Kichuga is the nearest rural locality.
