= Nizhneye Pankratovo =

Nizhneye Pankratovo Нижнее Панкратово
- Village
- Location within Vologda Oblast Location within Russia
- Coordinates: 60°46′N 46°24′E
- Country: Russia
- Region: Vologda Oblast
- District: Velikoustyugsky District
- Time zone: UTC+3:00

Nizhneye Pankratovo (Russian: Нижнее Панкратово) is a rural locality (a village) in Shemogodskoye Rural Settlement, Velikoustyugsky District, Vologda Oblast, Russia. The population was 8 as of 2002.

== Geography ==
Nizhneye Pankratovo is located 18 km northeast of Veliky Ustyug (the district's administrative centre) by road. Aristovo is the nearest rural locality.
