= Bobrovnikovo =

Bobrovnikovo Бобровниково
- Village
- Location within Vologda Oblast Location within Russia
- Coordinates: 60°49′N 46°25′E
- Country: Russia
- Region: Vologda Oblast
- District: Velikoustyugsky District
- Time zone: UTC+3:00

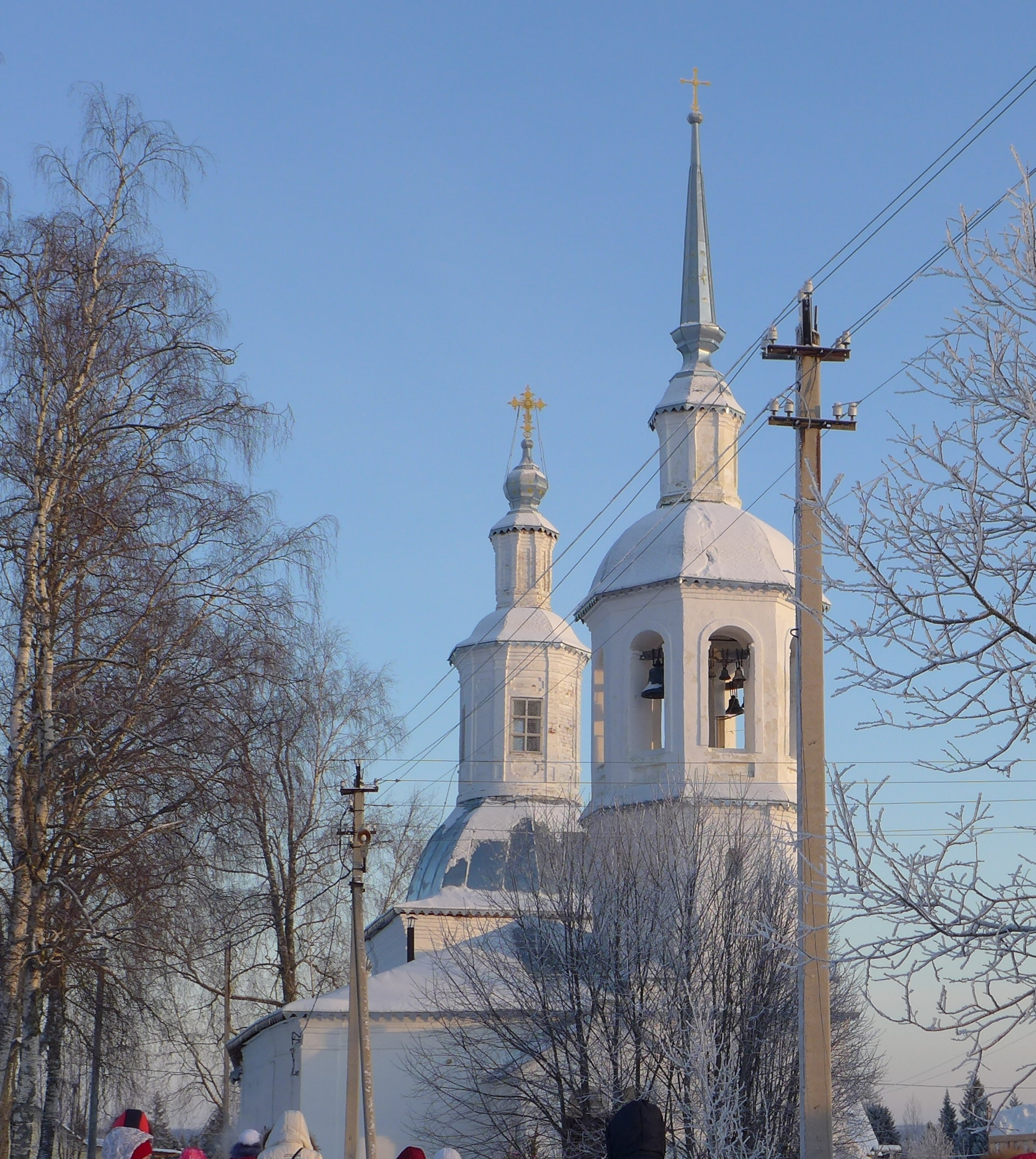
Church of the Vladimir Mother of God in Bobrovnikovo

Bobrovnikovo (Russian: Бобровниково) is a rural locality (a village) in Yudinskoye Rural Settlement, Velikoustyugsky District, Vologda Oblast, Russia. The population was 240 as of 2002. There are 10 streets.

== Geography ==
Bobrovnikovo is located 11 km northeast of Veliky Ustyug (the district's administrative centre) by road. Kupriyanovo is the nearest rural locality.
