= Popovskoye =

Popovskoye Поповское
- Village
- Location within Vologda Oblast Location within Russia
- Coordinates: 60°47′N 46°26′E
- Country: Russia
- Region: Vologda Oblast
- District: Velikoustyugsky District
- Time zone: UTC+3:00

Popovskoye (Russian: Поповское) is a rural locality (a village) in Shemogodskoye Rural Settlement, Velikoustyugsky District, Vologda Oblast, Russia. The population was 5 as of 2002.

== Geography ==
Popovskoye is located 20 km northeast of Veliky Ustyug (the district's administrative centre) by road. Fedorovskoye is the nearest rural locality.
