= Kushalovo =

Kushalovo Кушалово
- Village
- Location within Vologda Oblast Location within Russia
- Coordinates: 60°36′N 46°51′E
- Country: Russia
- Region: Vologda Oblast
- District: Velikoustyugsky District
- Time zone: UTC+3:00

Kushalovo (Russian: Кушалово) is a rural locality (a village) in Pokrovskoye Rural Settlement, Velikoustyugsky District, Vologda Oblast, Russia. The population was 28 as of 2002. There are 2 streets.

== Geography ==
Kushalovo is located 51 km southeast of Veliky Ustyug (the district's administrative centre) by road. Pervomayskoye is the nearest rural locality.
