= Pervomayskoye, Velikoustyugsky District, Vologda Oblast =

Pervomayskoye Первомайское
- Village
- Location within Vologda Oblast Location within Russia
- Coordinates: 60°36′N 46°52′E
- Country: Russia
- Region: Vologda Oblast
- District: Velikoustyugsky District
- Time zone: UTC+3:00

Pervomayskoye (Russian: Первомайское) is a rural locality (a village) in Pokrovskoye Rural Settlement, Velikoustyugsky District, Vologda Oblast, Russia. The population was 131 as of 2002. There are five streets.

== Geography ==
Pervomayskoye is located 51 km southeast of Veliky Ustyug (the district's administrative centre) by road. Kushalovo is the nearest rural locality.
