= Ivashevo, Velikoustyugsky District, Vologda Oblast =

Ivashevo Ивашево
- Village
- Location within Vologda Oblast Location within Russia
- Coordinates: 60°44′N 46°17′E
- Country: Russia
- Region: Vologda Oblast
- District: Velikoustyugsky District
- Time zone: UTC+3:00

Ivashevo (Russian: Ивашево) is a rural locality (a village) in Tregubovskoye Rural Settlement, Velikoustyugsky District, Vologda Oblast, Russia. The population was 61 as of 2002.

== Geography ==
Ivashevo is located 9 km northwest of Veliky Ustyug (the district's administrative centre) by road. Belozerovo is the nearest rural locality.
