= Bolshoye Voroshnino =

Bolshoye Voroshnino Большое Ворошнино
- Village
- Location within Vologda Oblast Location within Russia
- Coordinates: 60°19′N 46°40′E
- Country: Russia
- Region: Vologda Oblast
- District: Velikoustyugsky District
- Time zone: UTC+3:00

Bolshoye Voroshnino (Russian: Большое Ворошнино) is a rural locality (a village) in Verkhnevarzhenskoye Rural Settlement, Velikoustyugsky District, Vologda Oblast, Russia. The population was 16 as of 2002.

== Geography ==
Bolshoye Voroshnino is located 75 km southeast of Veliky Ustyug (the district's administrative centre) by road. Marilovo is the nearest rural locality.
