= Blagoveshchenye =

Blagoveshchenye Благовещенье
- Village
- Location within Vologda Oblast Location within Russia
- Coordinates: 60°43′N 46°06′E
- Country: Russia
- Region: Vologda Oblast
- District: Velikoustyugsky District
- Time zone: UTC+3:00

Blagoveshchenye (Russian: Благовещенье) is a rural locality (a village) and the administrative center of Mardengskoye Rural Settlement, Velikoustyugsky District, Vologda Oblast, Russia. The population was 474 as of 2002. There are 14 streets.

== Geography ==
Blagoveshchenye is located 17 km southwest of Veliky Ustyug (the district's administrative centre) by road. Teltevo is the nearest rural locality.
