= Aristovo, Velikoustyugsky District, Vologda Oblast =

Aristovo Аристово
- Village
- Location within Vologda Oblast Location within Russia
- Coordinates: 60°45′N 46°24′E
- Country: Russia
- Region: Vologda Oblast
- District: Velikoustyugsky District

Population (2002)
  - Total: 620
- Time zone: UTC+3:00
- Postal code: 162386

Aristovo (Russian: Аристово) is a rural locality (a village) and the administrative center of Shemogodskoye Rural Settlement, Velikoustyugsky District, Vologda Oblast, Russia. The population was 620 as of 2002. There are 9 streets.

== Geography ==
Aristovo is located 16 kilometres (9.9 mi) east of Veliky Ustyug (the district's administrative centre) by road. Kuznetsovo is the nearest rural locality. The area surrounding the town has a record of geo-magnetic anomalies. The town can be found 764.1 kilometres (474.8 mi) Northwest of Moscow, which is the capital.
