= Bobykino =

Bobykino Бобыкино
- Village
- Location within Vologda Oblast Location within Russia
- Coordinates: 60°28′N 46°40′E
- Country: Russia
- Region: Vologda Oblast
- District: Velikoustyugsky District
- Time zone: UTC+3:00

Bobykino (Russian: Бобыкино) is a village) in Orlovskoye Rural Settlement, Velikoustyugsky District, Vologda Oblast, Russia. The population was 5 as of 2002.

== Geography ==
Bobykino is located 70 km southeast of Veliky Ustyug (the district's administrative centre) by road. Pleso is the nearest rural locality.
