= Verkhneye Yakutino =

Verkhneye Yakutino Верхнее Якутино
- Village
- Location within Vologda Oblast Location within Russia
- Coordinates: 60°36′N 46°11′E
- Country: Russia
- Region: Vologda Oblast
- District: Velikoustyugsky District
- Time zone: UTC+3:00

Verkhneye Yakutino (Russian: Верхнее Якутино) is a rural locality (a village) in Tregubovskoye Rural Settlement, Velikoustyugsky District, Vologda Oblast, Russia. The population was 112 as of 2002.

== Geography ==
Verkhneye Yakutino is located 24 km southwest of Veliky Ustyug (the district's administrative centre) by road. Luzhevitsa is the nearest rural locality.
