= Antsiferovo, Velikoustyugsky District, Vologda Oblast =

Antsiferovo Анциферово
- Village
- Location within Vologda Oblast Location within Russia
- Coordinates: 60°35′N 46°47′E
- Country: Russia
- Region: Vologda Oblast
- District: Velikoustyugsky District
- Time zone: UTC+3:00

Antsiferovo (Russian: Анциферово) is a rural locality (a village) in Pokrovskoye Rural Settlement, Velikoustyugsky District, Vologda Oblast, Russia. The population was 5 as of 2002.

== Geography ==
Antsiferovo is located 57 km southeast of Veliky Ustyug (the district's administrative centre) by road. Maloye Chebayevo is the nearest rural locality.
