= Vozdvizhenye, Velikoustyugsky District, Vologda Oblast =

Vozdvizhenye Воздвиженье
- Village
- Location within Vologda Oblast Location within Russia
- Coordinates: 60°46′N 46°13′E
- Country: Russia
- Region: Vologda Oblast
- District: Velikoustyugsky District
- Time zone: UTC+3:00

Vozdvizhenye (Russian: Воздвиженье) is a rural locality (a village) in Mardengskoye Rural Settlement, Velikoustyugsky District, Vologda Oblast, Russia. The population was 12 as of 2002.

== Geography ==
Vozdvizhenye is located 9 km northwest of Veliky Ustyug (the district's administrative centre) by road. Ishutino is the nearest rural locality.
