= Bakharevo =

Bakharevo Бахарево
- Village
- Location within Vologda Oblast Location within Russia
- Coordinates: 60°44′N 46°24′E
- Country: Russia
- Region: Vologda Oblast
- District: Velikoustyugsky District
- Time zone: UTC+3:00

Bakharevo (Russian: Бахарево) is a rural locality (a village) in Shemogodskoye Rural Settlement, Velikoustyugsky District, Vologda Oblast, Russia. The population was 136 as of 2002.

== Geography ==
Bakharevo is located 14 km southeast of Veliky Ustyug (the district's administrative centre) by road. Chyornaya is the nearest rural locality.
