= Ruposovo =

Ruposovo Рупосово
- Village
- Location within Vologda Oblast Location within Russia
- Coordinates: 60°42′N 45°46′E
- Country: Russia
- Region: Vologda Oblast
- District: Velikoustyugsky District
- Time zone: UTC+3:00

Ruposovo (Russian: Рупосово) is a rural locality (a village) in Nizhneyerogodskoye Rural Settlement, Velikoustyugsky District, Vologda Oblast, Russia. The population was 3 as of 2002.

== Geography ==
Ruposovo is located 41 km southwest of Veliky Ustyug (the district's administrative centre) by road. Solovyevo is the nearest rural locality.
