= Rogozinino =

Rogozinino Рогозинино
- Village
- Location within Vologda Oblast Location within Russia
- Coordinates: 60°45′N 46°20′E
- Country: Russia
- Region: Vologda Oblast
- District: Velikoustyugsky District
- Time zone: UTC+3:00

Rogozinino (Russian: Рогозинино) is a rural locality (a village) in Yudinskoye Rural Settlement, Velikoustyugsky District, Vologda Oblast, Russia. The population was 23 as of 2002.

== Geography ==
Rogozinino is located 4 km southeast of Veliky Ustyug (the district's administrative centre) by road. Sulinskaya is the nearest rural locality.
