= Novaya Derevnya, Velikoustyugsky District, Vologda Oblast =

Novaya Derevnya Новая Деревня
- Village
- Location within Vologda Oblast Location within Russia
- Coordinates: 60°58′N 46°28′E
- Country: Russia
- Region: Vologda Oblast
- District: Velikoustyugsky District
- Time zone: UTC+3:00

Novaya Derevnya (Russian: Новая Деревня) is a rural locality (a village) in Krasavino Urban Settlement, Velikoustyugsky District, Vologda Oblast, Russia. As of 2002, the population was 28.

== Geography ==
Novaya Derevnya is located 28 km northeast of Veliky Ustyug (the district's administrative centre) by road. Bukhinino is the nearest rural locality.
