= Kuzminskaya Vystavka =

Kuzminskaya Vystavka Кузьминская Выставка
- Village
- Location within Vologda Oblast Location within Russia
- Coordinates: 60°37′N 46°17′E
- Country: Russia
- Region: Vologda Oblast
- District: Velikoustyugsky District
- Time zone: UTC+3:00

Kuzminskaya Vystavka (Russian: Кузьминская Выставка) is a rural locality (a village) in Parfyonovskoye Rural Settlement, Velikoustyugsky District, Vologda Oblast, Russia. The population was 4 as of 2002.

== Geography ==
Kuzminskaya Vystavka is located 23 km south of Veliky Ustyug (the district's administrative centre) by road. Parfenovskaya Vystavka is the nearest rural locality.
