= Podborye =

Podborye Подборье
- Village
- Location within Vologda Oblast Location within Russia
- Coordinates: 60°29′N 46°38′E
- Country: Russia
- Region: Vologda Oblast
- District: Velikoustyugsky District
- Time zone: UTC+3:00

Podborye (Russian: Подборье) is a rural locality (a village) in Orlovskoye Rural Settlement, Velikoustyugsky District, Vologda Oblast, Russia. The population was 10 as of 2002.

== Geography ==
Podborye is located 67 km southeast of Veliky Ustyug (the district's administrative centre) by road. Chernevo is the nearest rural locality.
