= Energetik, Vologda Oblast =

Energetik Энергетик
- Settlement
- Location within Vologda Oblast Location within Russia
- Coordinates: 60°47′N 46°18′E
- Country: Russia
- Region: Vologda Oblast
- District: Velikoustyugsky District
- Time zone: UTC+3:00

Energetik (Russian: Энергетик) is a rural locality (a settlement) in Yudinskoye Rural Settlement, Velikoustyugsky District, Vologda Oblast, Russia. The population was 112 as of 2002.

== Geography ==
Energetik is located 24 km southwest of Veliky Ustyug (the district's administrative centre) by road. Leonovo is the nearest rural locality.
