= Bolshoy Dvor, Velikoustyugsky District, Vologda Oblast =

Bolshoy Dvor Большой Двор
- Village
- Location within Vologda Oblast Location within Russia
- Coordinates: 60°31′43″N 46°29′24″E
- Country: Russia
- Region: Vologda Oblast
- District: Velikoustyugsky District
- Time zone: UTC+3:00

Bolshoy Dvor (Russian: Большой Двор) is a rural locality (a village) in ust-Alexeyevskoye Rural Settlement, Velikoustyugsky District, Vologda Oblast, Russia. The population was 32 as of 2002.

== Geography ==
The distance to Veliky Ustyug is 60 km, to Ust-Alexeyevo is 8 km. Opalevo is the nearest rural locality.
