= Belozerovo, Ust-Alexeyevskoye Rural Settlement, Velikoustyugsky District, Vologda Oblast =

Belozerovo Белозерово
- Village
- Location within Vologda Oblast Location within Russia
- Coordinates: 60°26′N 46°29′E
- Country: Russia
- Region: Vologda Oblast
- District: Velikoustyugsky District
- Time zone: UTC+3:00

Belozerovo (Russian: Белозерово) is a rural locality (a village) in Ust-Alexeyevskoye Rural Settlement, Velikoustyugsky District, Vologda Oblast, Russia. The population was 8 as of 2002.

== Geography ==
The distance to Veliky Ustyug is 54 km, to Ust-Alexeyevo is 2 km. Dresvishche is the nearest rural locality.
