= Gribino =

Gribino Грибино
- Village
- Location within Vologda Oblast Location within Russia
- Coordinates: 60°38′N 46°43′E
- Country: Russia
- Region: Vologda Oblast
- District: Velikoustyugsky District
- Time zone: UTC+3:00

Gribino (Russian: Грибино) is a rural locality (a village) in Bukovo Rural Settlement, Velikoustyugsky District, Vologda Oblast, Russia. The population was 6 as of 2002.

== Geography ==
Gribino is located 39 km southeast of Veliky Ustyug (the district's administrative centre) by road. Bukovo is the nearest rural locality.
