= Vargalovo =

Vargalovo Варгалово
- Village
- Location within Vologda Oblast Location within Russia
- Coordinates: 60°31′N 46°26′E
- Country: Russia
- Region: Vologda Oblast
- District: Velikoustyugsky District
- Time zone: UTC+3:00

Vargalovo (Russian: Варгалово) is a rural locality (a village) in Ust-Alexeyevskoye Rural Settlement, Velikoustyugsky District, Vologda Oblast, Russia. The population was 5 as of 2002.

== Geography ==
Vargalovo is located 66 km southeast of Veliky Ustyug (the district's administrative centre) by road. Artemovka is the nearest rural locality.
