= Lenivitsa =

Lenivitsa Ленивица
- Village
- Location within Vologda Oblast Location within Russia
- Coordinates: 60°42′N 45°53′E
- Country: Russia
- Region: Vologda Oblast
- District: Velikoustyugsky District
- Time zone: UTC+3:00

Lenivitsa (Russian: Ленивица) is a rural locality (a village) in Nizhneyerogodskoye Rural Settlement, Velikoustyugsky District, Vologda Oblast, Russia. The population was 3 as of 2002.

== Geography ==
Lenivitsa is located 30 km southwest of Veliky Ustyug (the district's administrative centre) by road. Pupyshevo is the nearest rural locality.
