= Kalashovo =

Kalashovo Калашово
- Village
- Location within Vologda Oblast Location within Russia
- Coordinates: 60°46′N 46°20′E
- Country: Russia
- Region: Vologda Oblast
- District: Velikoustyugsky District
- Time zone: UTC+3:00

Kalashovo (Russian: Калашово) is a rural locality (a village) in Yudinskoye Rural Settlement, Velikoustyugsky District, Vologda Oblast, Russia. The population was 48 as of 2002.

== Geography ==
Kalashovo is located 4 km northeast of Veliky Ustyug (the district's administrative centre) by road. Yudino is the nearest rural locality.
