= Paykino =

Paykino Пайкино
- Village
- Location within Vologda Oblast Location within Russia
- Coordinates: 60°48′N 46°24′E
- Country: Russia
- Region: Vologda Oblast
- District: Velikoustyugsky District
- Time zone: UTC+3:00

Paykino (Russian: Пайкино) is a rural locality (a village) in Yudinskoye Rural Settlement, Velikoustyugsky District, Vologda Oblast, Russia. The population was 1 as of 2002.

== Geography ==
Paykino is located 11 km northeast of Veliky Ustyug (the district's administrative centre) by road. Zayamzha is the nearest rural locality.
