= Maloye Chebayevo =

Maloye Chebayevo Малое Чебаево
- Village
- Location within Vologda Oblast Location within Russia
- Coordinates: 60°35′N 46°44′E
- Country: Russia
- Region: Vologda Oblast
- District: Velikoustyugsky District
- Time zone: UTC+3:00

Maloye Chebayevo (Russian: Малое Чебаево) is a rural locality (a village) in Pokrovksoye Rural Settlement, Velikoustyugsky District, Vologda Oblast, Russia. The population was 29 as of 2002.

== Geography ==
Maloye Chebayevo is located 35 km southeast of Veliky Ustyug (the district's administrative centre) by road. Ilyinskoye is the nearest rural locality.
