= Nikulino, Opokskoye Rural Settlement, Velikoustyugsky District, Vologda Oblast =

Nikulino Никулино
- Village
- Location within Vologda Oblast Location within Russia
- Coordinates: 60°35′N 45°25′E
- Country: Russia
- Region: Vologda Oblast
- District: Velikoustyugsky District
- Time zone: UTC+3:00

Nikulino (Russian: Никулино) is a rural locality (a village) in Opokskoye Rural Settlement, Velikoustyugsky District, Vologda Oblast, Russia. The population was 2 as of 2002.

== Geography ==
The distance to Veliky Ustyug is 61 km, to Poldarsa is 2 km. Priluki is the nearest rural locality.
