= Izmarukhovo =

Izmarukhovo Измарухово
- Village
- Location within Vologda Oblast Location within Russia
- Coordinates: 60°39′N 46°52′E
- Country: Russia
- Region: Vologda Oblast
- District: Velikoustyugsky District
- Time zone: UTC+3:00

Izmarukhovo (Russian: Измарухово) is a rural locality (a village) in Pokrovskoye Rural Settlement, Velikoustyugsky District, Vologda Oblast, Russia. The population was 96 as of 2002.

== Geography ==
The distance to Veliky Ustyug is 43 km, to Ilyinskoye is 13 km.
