= Aksenovsky Pochinok =

Aksenovsky Pochinok Аксёновский Починок
- Village
- Location within Vologda Oblast Location within Russia
- Coordinates: 60°29′N 46°28′E
- Country: Russia
- Region: Vologda Oblast
- District: Velikoustyugsky District
- Time zone: UTC+3:00

Aksenovsky Pochinok (Russian: Аксёновский Починок) is a rural locality, or village, in Ust-Alexeyevskoye Rural Settlement, Velikoustyugsky District, Vologda Oblast, Russia. The population was 15 as of 2002.

== Geography ==
Aksenovsky Pochinok is located 57 km southeast of Veliky Ustyug (the district's administrative centre) by road. Ust-Alexeyevo is the nearest rural locality.
