= Medenitsyno =

Medenitsyno Меденицыно
- Village
- Location within Vologda Oblast Location within Russia
- Coordinates: 60°45′N 46°14′E
- Country: Russia
- Region: Vologda Oblast
- District: Velikoustyugsky District
- Time zone: UTC+3:00

Medenitsyno (Russian: Меденицыно) is a rural locality (a village) in Samotovinskoye Rural Settlement, Velikoustyugsky District, Vologda Oblast, Russia. The population was 28 as of 2002. There are 2 streets.

== Geography ==
Medenitsyno is located 5 km west of Veliky Ustyug (the district's administrative centre) by road. Zherebyatyevo is the nearest rural locality.
