= Bolshaya Sloboda =

Bolshaya Sloboda Большая Слобода
- Village
- Location within Vologda Oblast Location within Russia
- Coordinates: 60°37′N 45°55′E
- Country: Russia
- Region: Vologda Oblast
- District: Velikoustyugsky District
- Time zone: UTC+3:00

Bolshaya Sloboda (Russian: Большая Слобода) is a rural locality (a village) in Samotovinskoye Rural Settlement, Velikoustyugsky District, Vologda Oblast, Russia. The population was 4 as of 2002.

== Geography ==
Bolshaya Sloboda is located 33 km southwest of Veliky Ustyug (the district's administrative centre) by road. Stepanitsa is the nearest rural locality.
