= Bayushevskaya =

Bayushevskaya Баюшевская
- Village
- Location within Vologda Oblast Location within Russia
- Coordinates: 60°37′N 46°55′E
- Country: Russia
- Region: Vologda Oblast
- District: Velikoustyugsky District
- Time zone: UTC+3:00

Bayushevskaya (Russian: Баюшевская) is a rural locality (a village) in Pokrovskoye Rural Settlement, Velikoustyugsky District, Vologda Oblast, Russia. The population was 4 as of 2002.

== Geography ==
Bayushevskaya is located 54 km southeast of Veliky Ustyug (the district's administrative centre) by road. Alexeyevskaya is the nearest rural locality.
