= Opalipsovo =

Opalipsovo Опалипсово
- Village
- Location within Vologda Oblast Location within Russia
- Coordinates: 60°43′N 46°11′E
- Country: Russia
- Region: Vologda Oblast
- District: Velikoustyugsky District
- Time zone: UTC+3:00

Opalipsovo (Russian: Опалипсово) is a rural locality (a village) in Samotovinskoye Rural Settlement, Velikoustyugsky District, Vologda Oblast, Russia. As of 2002, its population was 52.

== Geography ==
Opalipsovo is located 9 km southwest of Veliky Ustyug, the district's administrative centre, by road. Osinovo is the nearest rural locality.
