= Podvorskiye =

Podvorskiye Подворские
- Village
- Location within Vologda Oblast Location within Russia
- Coordinates: 60°42′N 46°21′E
- Country: Russia
- Region: Vologda Oblast
- District: Velikoustyugsky District
- Time zone: UTC+3:00

Podvorskiye (Russian: Подворские) is a rural locality (a village) in Shemogodskoye Rural Settlement, Velikoustyugsky District, Vologda Oblast, Russia. The population was 15 as of 2002.

== Geography ==
Podvorskiye is located 11 km southeast of Veliky Ustyug (the district's administrative centre) by road. Kopylovo is the nearest rural locality.
