= Velikoustyugsky District =

Velikoustyugsky District Великоустюгский район (Russian)
- District
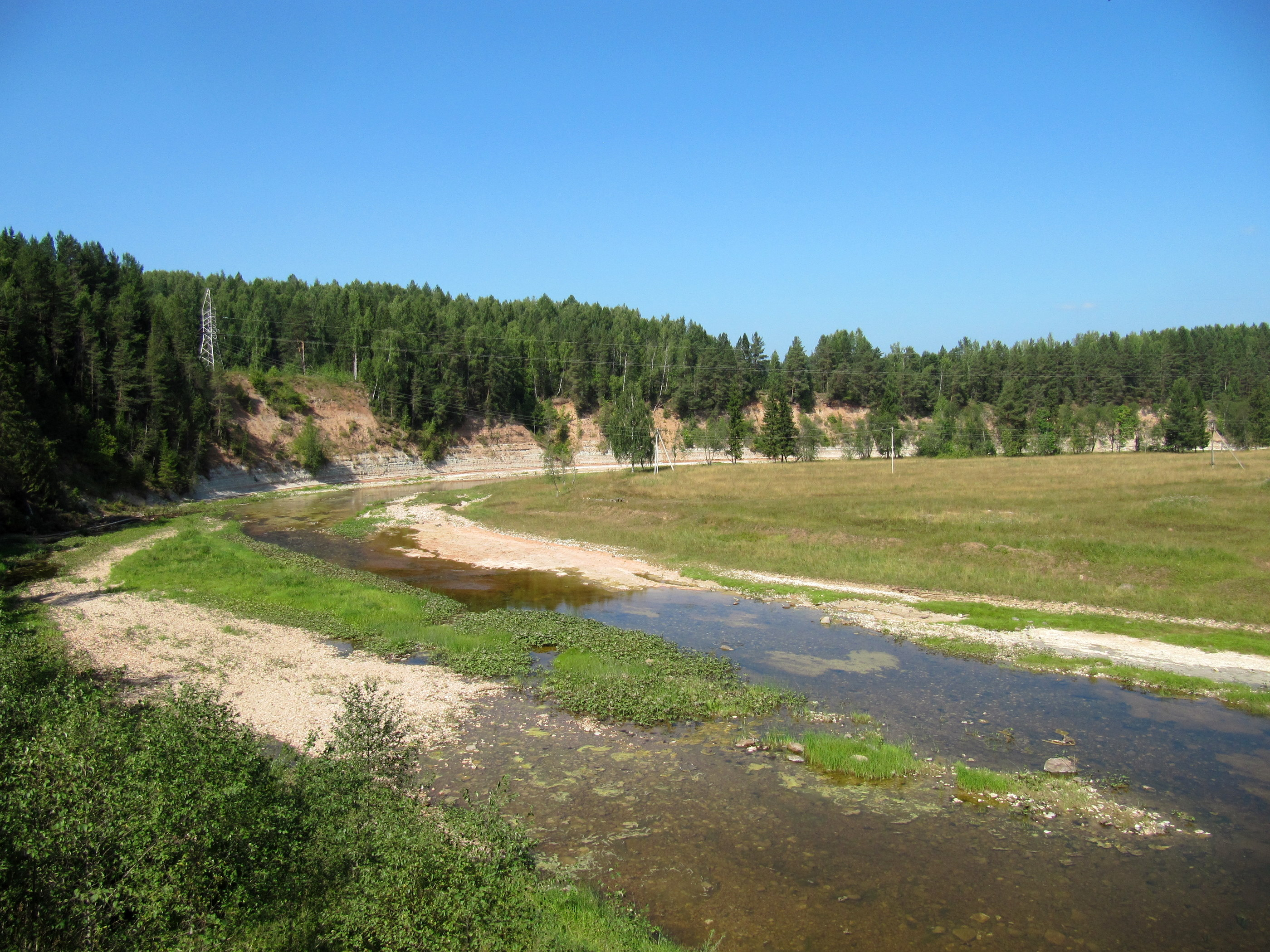
- The Strelna River near the village of Studenoye in Velikoustyugsky District

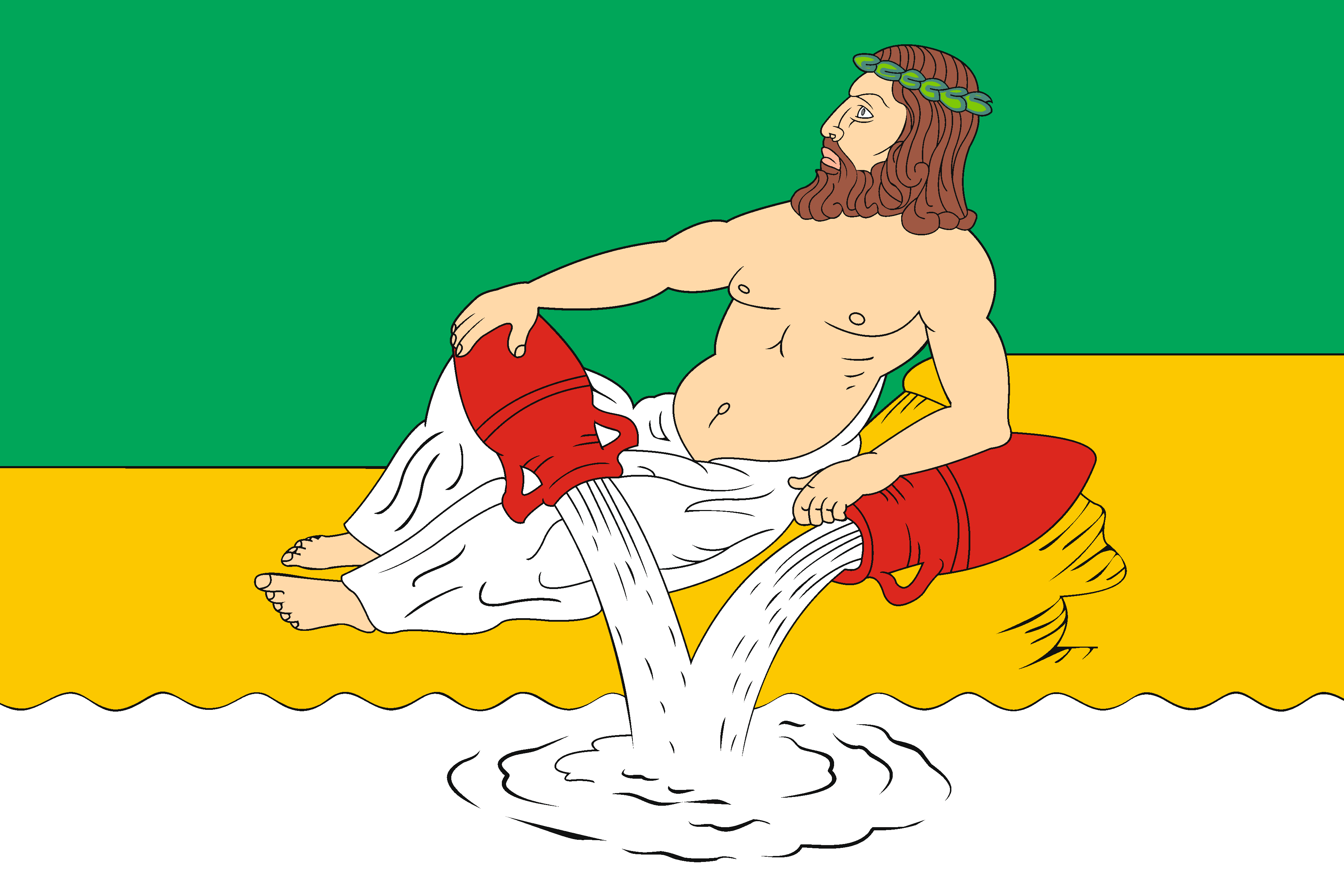
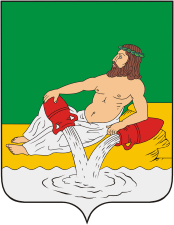
- Flag Coat of arms
- Location of Velikoustyugsky District in Vologda Oblast
- Coordinates: 60°46′N 46°18′E
- Country: Russia
- Federal subject: Vologda Oblast
- Established: June 10, 1924
- Administrative center: Veliky Ustyug

Area
  - Total: 7,700 km^{2} (3,000 sq mi)

Population (2010 Census)
  - Total: 18,087
  - Density: 2.3/km^{2} (6.1/sq mi)
  - Urban: 0%
  - Rural: 100%

Administrative structure
  - Administrative divisions: 20 Selsoviets
  - Inhabited localities: 434 rural localities

Municipal structure
  - Municipally incorporated as: Velikoustyugsky Municipal District
  - Municipal divisions: 3 urban settlements, 17 rural settlements
- Time zone: UTC+3 (MSK)
- OKTMO ID: 19614000
- Website: http://www.vumr.ru

Velikoustyugsky District (Russian: Великоу́стюгский райо́н) is an administrative and municipal district (raion), one of the twenty-six in Vologda Oblast, Russia. It is located in the northeast of the oblast and borders with Kotlassky District of Arkhangelsk Oblast in the north, Luzsky District of Kirov Oblast in the east, Podosinovsky District of Kirov Oblast in the southeast, Kichmengsko-Gorodetsky District in the south, Nyuksensky District in the west, and with Ustyansky District of Arkhangelsk Oblast in the northwest. The area of the district is 7,700 square kilometers (3,000 sq mi). Its administrative center is the town of Veliky Ustyug (which is not administratively a part of the district). Population: 18,087 (2010 census); 22,210 (2002 Census); 26,146 (1989 Soviet census).

== Geography ==
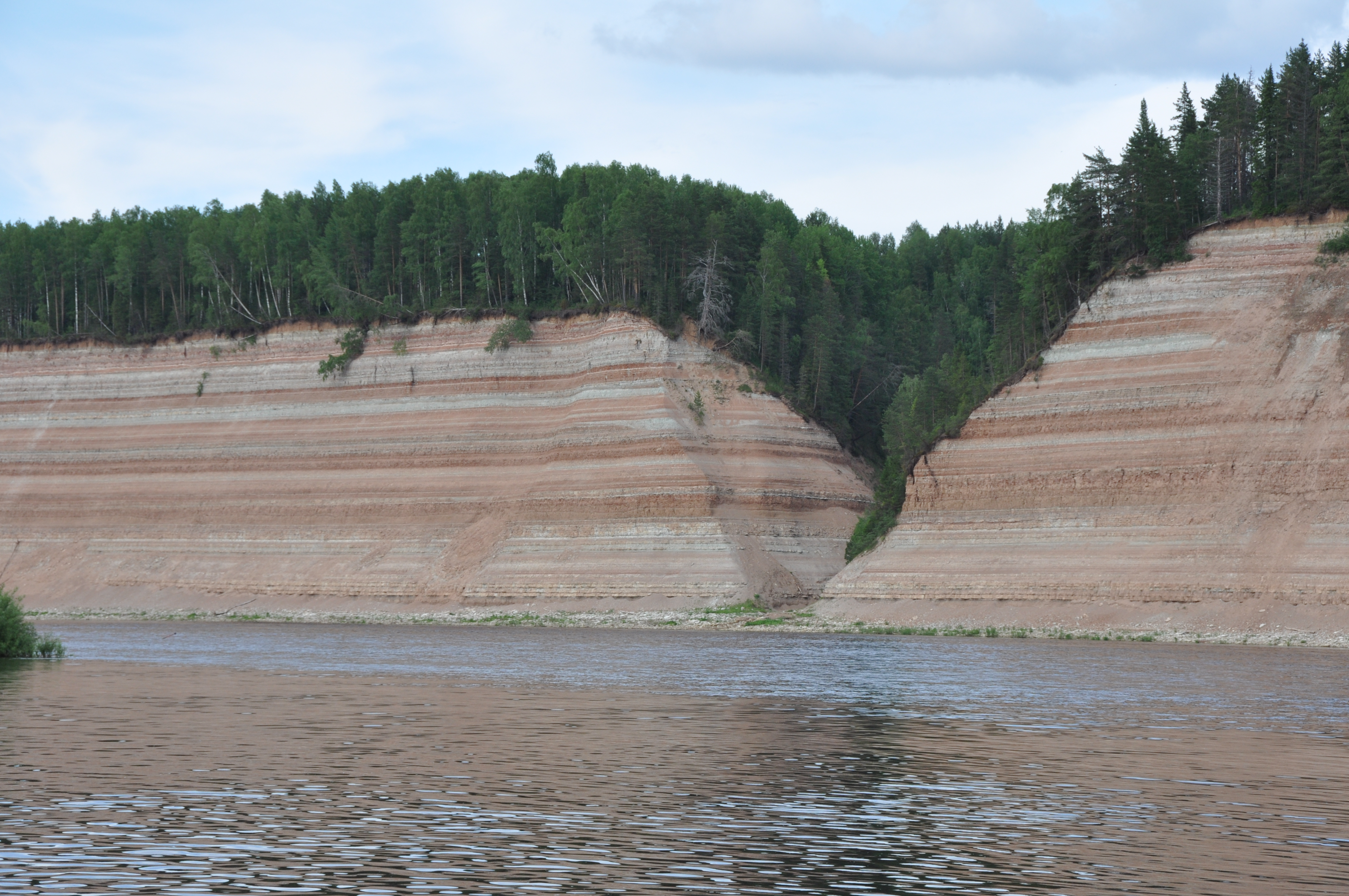
The banks of the Sukhona River in the village of Porog

In Veliky Ustyug, the Sukhona and Yug Rivers form the Northern Dvina, one of the biggest rivers in Europe. Upstream from the town of Kotlas, and especially within the limits of the district, the Northern Dvina is sometimes referred to as the Little Northern Dvina. The Sukhona, the Yug, and the Northern Dvina split the district into three roughly equal areas. The biggest tributary of the Yug within the district is the Luza River. Minor areas in the west of the district lie in the basin of the Kizema River, itself in the basin of the Vaga. Some areas in the north of the district are in the basin of the Ustya River, a tributary of the Vaga. The whole district belongs to the basin of the Northern Dvina.

Almost the whole of the district is covered by coniferous forests (taiga). The exception are the meadows in the floodplains.

== History ==
The area was populated by the Finnic peoples and then colonized by the Vladimir-Suzdal Principality (in contrast to the surrounding areas, which were a part of the Novgorod Republic). Veliky Ustyug is one of the oldest settlements in the Russian North and was first mentioned in the chronicles in 1207. The Novgorod merchants used the Sukhona River as one of the main waterways leading to the White Sea and the Pechora, and Veliky Ustyug was the only point on this waterway not belonging to Novgorod. In the 14th century, the area became a part of the Grand Duchy of Moscow.

In the course of the administrative reform carried out in 1708 by Peter the Great, the area was included into Archangelgorod Governorate. Veliky Ustyug was explicitly mentioned as one of the twenty towns comprising the governorate. From 1719, it was the seat of Ustyug Province, one of the four provinces of Archangelgorod Governorate. In 1780, the governorate was abolished and transformed into Vologda Viceroyalty. The latter was abolished in 1796, and Veliky Ustyug became the seat of Velikoustyugsky Uyezd of Vologda Governorate. In 1918, the area was transferred to the newly established Northern Dvina Governorate with the administrative center located in Veliky Ustyug. In 1924, the uyezds were abolished in favor of the new divisions, the districts (raions).

On June 19, 1924, Velikoustyugsky District was established. Ust-Alexeyevsky District with the administrative center of Ust-Alexeyevo was established at the same time. On February 27, 1928, Ust-Alexeyevsky District was merged into Velikoustyugsky District. In 1929, Northern Dvina Governorate was merged into Northern Krai. The krai consisted of five okrugs, one of which, Northern Dvina Okrug, had its administrative center in Veliky Ustyug. In July 1930, the okrugs were abolished, and the districts were directly subordinated to Northern Krai. On January 25, 1935, Ust-Alexeyevsky District was re-established.

In 1936, Northern Krai was transformed into Northern Oblast, and in 1937, Northern Oblast itself was split into Arkhangelsk Oblast and Vologda Oblast. Velikoustyugsky District has remained in Vologda Oblast ever since. In 1959, Ust-Alexeyevsky District was merged back into Velikoustyugsky District.

== Administrative and municipal divisions ==
Within the framework of administrative divisions, Velikoustyugsky District is one of the twenty-six in the oblast. The town of Veliky Ustyug serves as its administrative center, despite being incorporated separately as a town of oblast significance—an administrative unit with the status equal to that of the districts (and which, in addition to Veliky Ustyug, also includes the town of Krasavino and the work settlement of Kuzino). The district is divided into twenty selsoviets.

As a municipal division, the district is incorporated as Velikoustyugsky Municipal District and is divided into three urban and nineteen rural settlements, with the town of oblast significance of Veliky Ustyug being incorporated within the municipal district as Veliky Ustyug Urban Settlement. The town of Krasavino and the urban-type settlement of Kuzino are also incorporated within the municipal district as urban settlements—Krasavino Urban Settlement and Kuzino Urban Settlement, correspondingly.

== Economy ==
The economy of the district is based on timber production. Food industry is present, and tourism plays an important role.

=== Transportation ===
A number of roads connect Veliky Ustyug with other towns. The road to the north runs to Krasavino and further to Kotlas. The one to the south runs to Nikolsk and further to Manturovo, where it connects to the road to Kostroma. The road to the southwest connects Veliky Ustyug with Vologda via Totma. All these roads are paved. An unpaved road, originating from Kuzino (which is connected with Veliky Ustyug by a ferry crossing) runs to Luza and continues to Lalsk and further to the Komi Republic.

The railroad connects Veliky Ustyug with Yadrikha railway station on the railroad connecting Konosha and Kotlas. Passenger service to Veliky Ustyug was discontinued in 2005. Two more railroads cross peripheral parts of the district: one connecting Konosha and Kotlas in the north (west of Yadrikha) and another one connecting Kirov and Kotlas in the northeast.

The Sukhona, the Yug, and the Northern Dvina are all navigable within the limits of the district, but there is no passenger navigation except for a number of ferry crossings.

Veliky Ustyug is served by the Veliky Ustyug Airport. There are no scheduled passenger flights.

== Culture and recreation ==
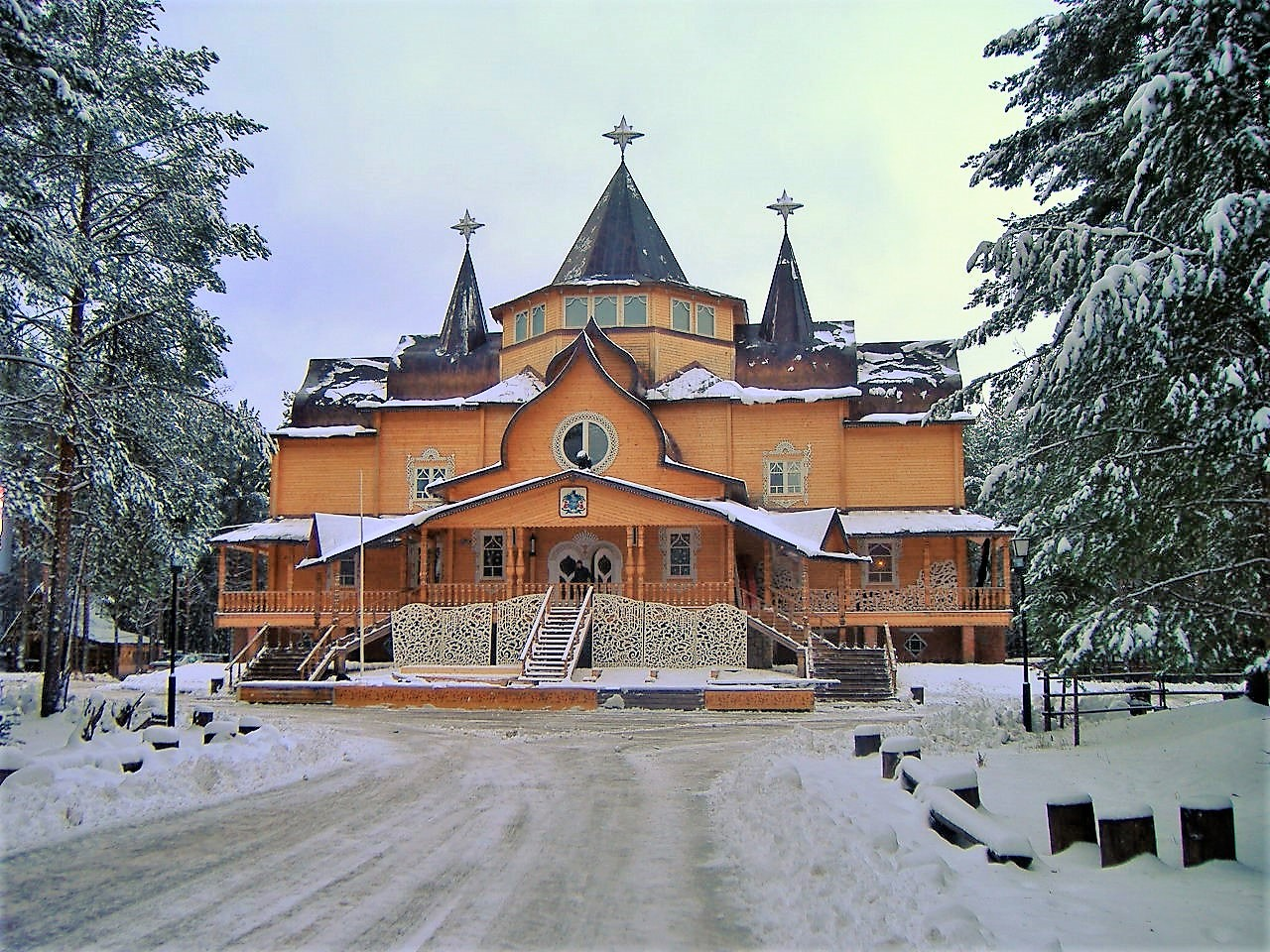
Main building of the Ded Moroz residence

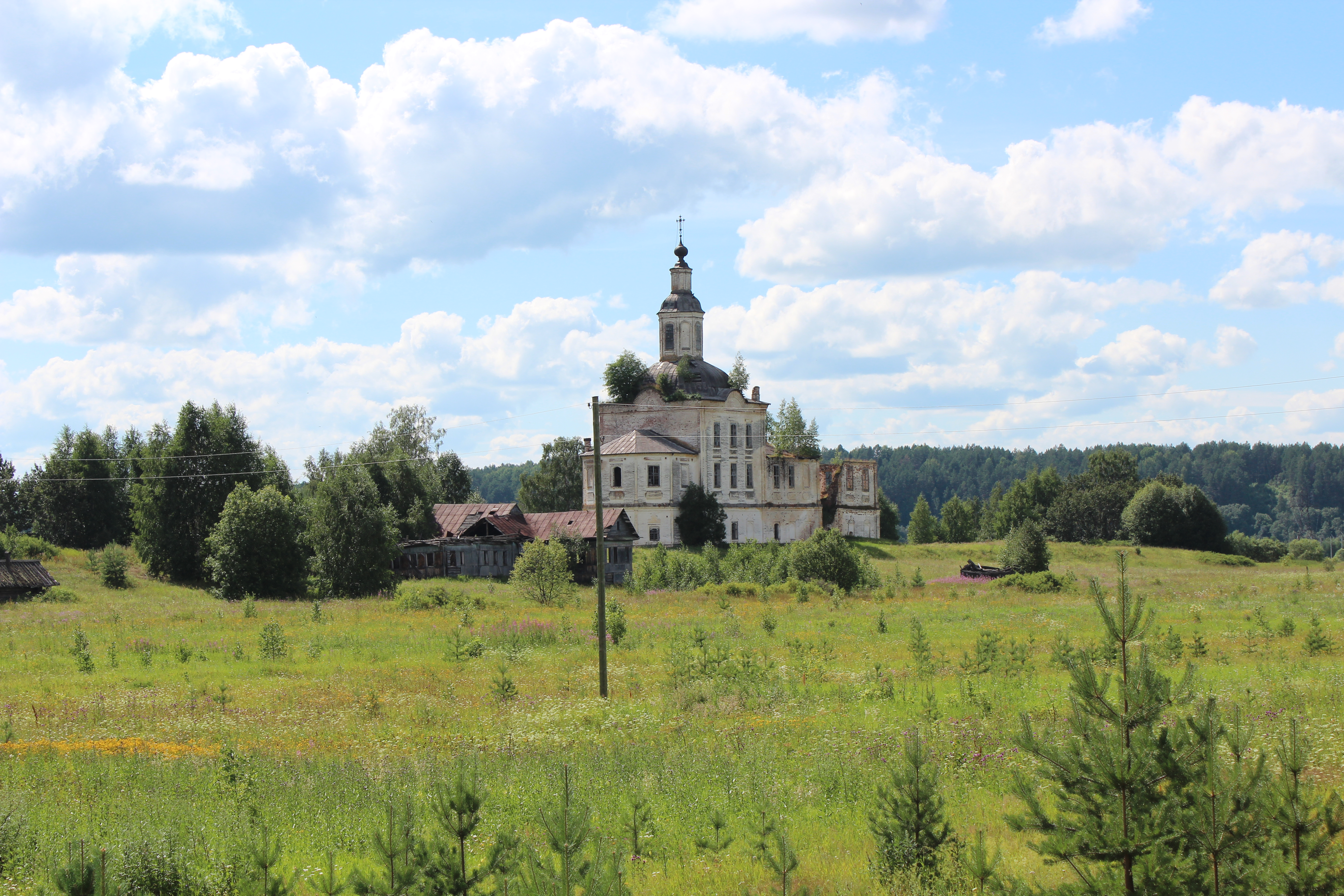
The Saint Basil Church in the village of Obradovo

The district contains one object classified as cultural and historical heritage by the Russian Federal law, and additionally forty-one objects classified as cultural and historical heritage of local importance. Most of these are wooden farms and churches built prior to 1917. These numbers do not include the protected monuments in Veliky Ustyug.

The only object protected at the federal level is the archaeological monument "Palemsky Gorodok".

Troitse-Gledensky Monastery in the village of Morozovitsa, close to the confluence of the Sukhona and the Yug, is located in the district.

Since the 1990s, Veliky Ustyug has been marketed as the residence of Ded Moroz, a fictional character similar to Santa Claus. The residence, which is a major tourist attraction, is actually located outside of the town, on the territory of Velikoustyugsky District.
