= 2024 Vologda Oblast gubernatorial election =

2024 Russian local election

- 6–8 September 2024
- Turnout: 49.15%
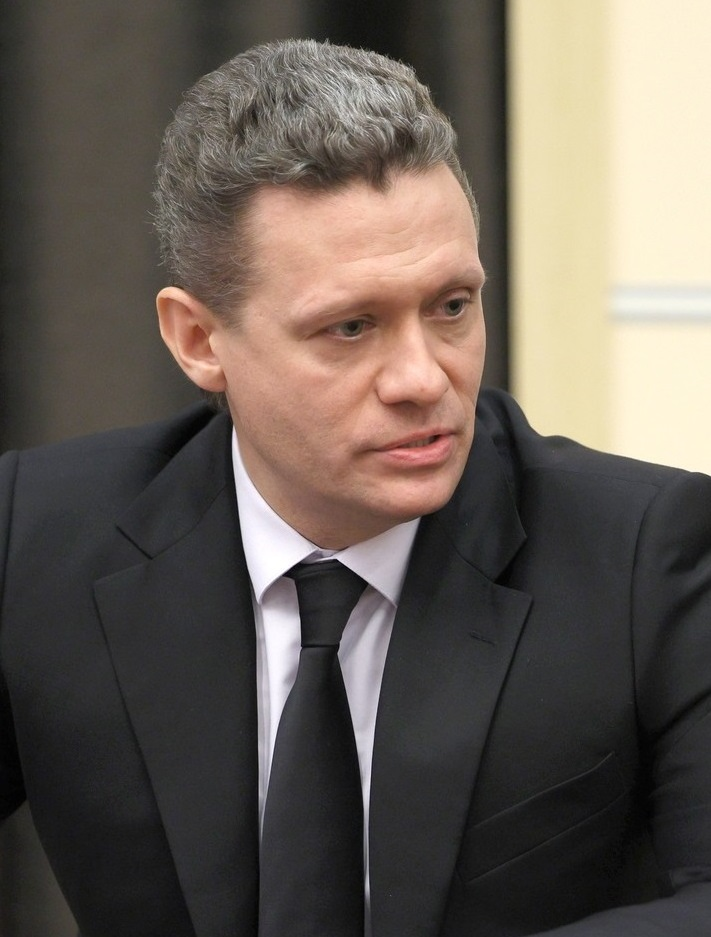

			LDPR
Candidate	Georgy Filimonov	Aleksandr Morozov	Anton Grimov
Party	United Russia	CPRF	LDPR
Popular vote	273,380	84,813	36,324
Percentage	62.30%	19.33%	8.28%
Governor before election
Georgy Filimonov (acting)
United Russia
Governor-elect
Georgy Filimonov
United Russia

The 2024 Vologda Oblast gubernatorial election took place on 6–8 September 2024, on common election day. Acting Governor Georgy Filimonov was elected for a full term in office.

== Background ==
Then-Cherepovets mayor Oleg Kuvshinnikov was appointed acting Governor of Vologda Oblast and was later elected by the Legislative Assembly of Vologda Oblast in December 2011, replacing four-term incumbent Governor Vyacheslav Pozgalyov. Kuvshinnikov resigned early in May 2014 and ran in the special gubernatorial election in September 2014 winning it with 62.98% of the vote. Kuvshinnikov ran for a third term in 2019 and won with 60.79% of the vote.

On 31 October 2023 Oleg Kuvshinnikov unexpectedly announced his resignation nearly a year ahead of the gubernatorial election. Deputy Chairman of the Moscow Oblast Government Georgy Filimonov was appointed acting Governor of Vologda Oblast the same day. In November 2023 Filimonov appointed his predecessor, Oleg Kuvshinnikov, to the Federation Council after incumbent Senator Olga Danilova, whom Kuvshinnikov himself appointed just 44 days ago, stepped down.

In January 2024 Legislative Assembly of Vologda Oblast changed the electoral law, allowing gubernatorial candidates run as a self-nominated. Later acting Governor Filimonov announced that he was not planning to join any political party and would run in the upcoming gubernatorial election as an independent. However, on May 24, 2024 Senator Andrey Turchak, the secretary general of United Russia, visited Vologda and personally handed over a party card to Governor Filimonov, who joined the party and announced his intention to run under its ticket.

== Candidates ==
In Vologda Oblast candidates for Governor can be nominated by registered political parties or by self-nomination. Candidate for Governor of Vologda Oblast should be a Russian citizen and at least 30 years old. Candidates for Governor should not have a foreign citizenship or residence permit. Each candidate in order to be registered is required to collect at least 7% of signatures of members and heads of municipalities. In addition, self-nominated candidates should collect 1% of signatures of Vologda Oblast residents. Also gubernatorial candidates present 3 candidacies to the Federation Council and election winner later appoints one of the presented candidates.

=== Declared ===
Candidate name, political party		Occupation	Status	Ref.
Georgy Filimonov; United Russia	Georgy Filimonov	Acting Governor of Vologda Oblast (2023–present); Former Deputy Chairman of the Government of Moscow Oblast (2021–2023)	Registered	
Anton Grimov; Liberal Democratic Party		Member of Legislative Assembly of Vologda Oblast (2011–present); Aide to State Duma member Sergey Karginov (2019–present)	Registered	
Igor Katukhin; Party of Pensioners		Member of Legislative Assembly of Vologda Oblast (2022–present)	Registered	
Denis Khripel; SR–ZP		Businessman; Son of former Federation Council member Gennady Khripel	Registered	
Aleksandr Morozov; Communist Party		Member of Legislative Assembly of Vologda Oblast (2011–present); 2014 and 2019 gubernatorial candidate	Registered	
Mikhail Dorofeyev; Independent		Chairman of Yabloko party Vologda city office (2016–present)	Withdrew	
Nikolay Tolchanov; Independent		Former first secretary of Communists of Russia regional committee in Tambov Oblast (2021–2023)	Did not file	

=== Declined ===
- Vladislav Zvorykin (SR–ZP), Member of Legislative Assembly of Vologda Oblast (2021–present), businessman

=== Candidates for Federation Council ===
Gubernatorial candidate, political party	Candidates for Federation Council	Status
Georgy Filimonov; United Russia	* Yevgeny Artemov, former Deputy Governor of Vologda Oblast (2012) * Oleg Kuvshinnikov, incumbent Senator (2023–present) * Andrey Lutsenko, former Chairman of the Legislative Assembly of Vologda Oblast (2016–2024)	Registered

== Finances ==
All sums are in rubles.

Financial Report	Source	Dorofeyev	Filimonov	Grimov	Katukhin	Khripel	Morozov	Tolchanov
First		12,875	10,100,000	185,000	1,030,000	30,000	30,000	0
Final		12,875	60,100,000	1,802,000	9,030,000	231,380	2,680,000	0

== Results ==
Summary of the 6–8 September 2024 Vologda Oblast gubernatorial election results
Candidate	Party	Votes	%
Georgy Filimonov (incumbent)	United Russia	273,380	62.30
Aleksandr Morozov	Communist Party	84,813	19.33
Anton Grimov	Liberal Democratic Party	36,324	8.28
Denis Khripel	A Just Russia – For Truth	19,385	4.42
Igor Katukhin	Party of Pensioners	17,662	4.02
Valid votes		431,564	98.34
Blank ballots		7,279	1.66
Total		438,843	100.00
Turnout		438,843	49.15
Registered voters		892,898	100.00

Governor Filimonov appointed former Deputy Governor Yevgeny Bogomazov (United Russia) to the Federation Council, replacing incumbent Senator Oleg Kuvshinnikov (United Russia), after all candidates nominated by Filimonov including Kuvshinnikov declined to take a seat.

== See also ==
- 2024 Russian regional elections
