= Semenkovo =

Semenkovo (Russian: Семенково) or Semyonkovo (Семёнково) is the name of several rural localities in Russia.

== Modern localities ==
=== Ivanovo Oblast ===
As of 2010, one rural locality in Ivanovo Oblast bears this name:

- Semenkovo, Ivanovo Oblast, a village in Kineshemsky District

=== Kaluga Oblast ===
As of 2010, one rural locality in Kaluga Oblast bears this name:

- Semenkovo, Kaluga Oblast, a village in Spas-Demensky District

=== Kostroma Oblast ===
As of 2011, four rural localities in Kostroma Oblast bear this name:

- Semenkovo, Buysky District, Kostroma Oblast, a village in Tsentralnoye Settlement of Buysky District
- Semenkovo, Chukhlomsky District, Kostroma Oblast, a village in Chukhlomskoye Settlement of Chukhlomsky District
- Semenkovo, Kostromskoy District, Kostroma Oblast, a village in Karavayevskoye Settlement of Kostromskoy District
- Semenkovo, Krasnoselsky District, Kostroma Oblast, a village in Gridinskoye Settlement of Krasnoselsky District

=== Moscow Oblast ===
As of 2010, ten rural localities in Moscow Oblast bear this name:

- Semenkovo, Dmitrovsky District, Moscow Oblast, a village under the administrative jurisdiction of the Town of Yakhroma in Dmitrovsky District
- Semenkovo, Bazarovskoye Rural Settlement, Kashirsky District, Moscow Oblast, a village in Bazarovskoye Rural Settlement of Kashirsky District
- Semenkovo, Koltovskoye Rural Settlement, Kashirsky District, Moscow Oblast, a village in Koltovskoye Rural Settlement of Kashirsky District
- Semenkovo, Klinsky District, Moscow Oblast, a village in Nudolskoye Rural Settlement of Klinsky District
- Semenkovo, Naro-Fominsky District, Moscow Oblast, a village under the administrative jurisdiction of the Town of Vereya in Naro-Fominsky District
- Semenkovo, Odintsovsky District, Moscow Oblast, a village in Nazaryevskoye Rural Settlement of Odintsovsky District
- Semenkovo, Podolsky District, Moscow Oblast, a village in Voronovskoye Rural Settlement of Podolsky District
- Semenkovo, Ruzsky District, Moscow Oblast, a village in Volkovskoye Rural Settlement of Ruzsky District
- Semenkovo, Serebryano-Prudsky District, Moscow Oblast, a village under the administrative jurisdiction of the work settlement of Serebryanye Prudy in Serebryano-Prudsky District
- Semenkovo, Sergiyevo-Posadsky District, Moscow Oblast, a village under the administrative jurisdiction of the Town of Krasnozavodsk in Sergiyevo-Posadsky District

=== Oryol Oblast ===
As of 2010, one rural locality in Oryol Oblast bears this name:

- Semenkovo, Oryol Oblast, a village in Retyazhsky Selsoviet of Kromskoy District

=== Smolensk Oblast ===
As of 2010, four rural localities in Smolensk Oblast bear this name:

- Semenkovo, Novoduginsky District, Smolensk Oblast, a village in Dneprovskoye Rural Settlement of Novoduginsky District
- Semenkovo, Smolensky District, Smolensk Oblast, a village in Talashkinskoye Rural Settlement of Smolensky District
- Semenkovo, Ugransky District, Smolensk Oblast, a village in Zakharyevskoye Rural Settlement of Ugransky District
- Semenkovo, Yelninsky District, Smolensk Oblast, a village in Korobetskoye Rural Settlement of Yelninsky District

=== Tver Oblast ===
As of 2010, two rural localities in Tver Oblast bear this name:

- Semenkovo, Kimrsky District, Tver Oblast, a village in Kimrsky District
- Semenkovo, Torzhoksky District, Tver Oblast, a village in Torzhoksky District

=== Vladimir Oblast ===
As of 2010, one rural locality in Vladimir Oblast bears this name:

- Semenkovo, Vladimir Oblast, a village in Alexandrovsky District

=== Vologda Oblast ===
As of 2010, eleven rural localities in Vologda Oblast bear this name:

- Semenkovo, Frolovsky Selsoviet, Gryazovetsky District, Vologda Oblast, a village in Frolovsky Selsoviet of Gryazovetsky District
- Semenkovo, Komyansky Selsoviet, Gryazovetsky District, Vologda Oblast, a village in Komyansky Selsoviet of Gryazovetsky District
- Semenkovo, Mezhdurechensky District, Vologda Oblast, a village in Nozemsky Selsoviet of Mezhdurechensky District
- Semenkovo, Sokolsky District, Vologda Oblast, a village in Arkhangelsky Selsoviet of Sokolsky District
- Semenkovo, Syamzhensky District, Vologda Oblast, a village in Zhityevsky Selsoviet of Syamzhensky District
- Semenkovo, Totemsky District, Vologda Oblast, a village in Pogorelovsky Selsoviet of Totemsky District
- Semenkovo, Goncharovsky Selsoviet, Vologodsky District, Vologda Oblast, a village in Goncharovsky Selsoviet of Vologodsky District
- Semenkovo, Kipelovsky Selsoviet, Vologodsky District, Vologda Oblast, a village in Kipelovsky Selsoviet of Vologodsky District
- Semenkovo, Oktyabrsky Selsoviet, Vologodsky District, Vologda Oblast, a village in Oktyabrsky Selsoviet of Vologodsky District
- Semenkovo, Semenkovsky Selsoviet, Vologodsky District, Vologda Oblast, a settlement in Semenkovsky Selsoviet of Vologodsky District
- Semenkovo, Veprevsky Selsoviet, Vologodsky District, Vologda Oblast, a village in Veprevsky Selsoviet of Vologodsky District

=== Yaroslavl Oblast ===
As of 2010, nine rural localities in Yaroslavl Oblast bear this name:

- Semenkovo, Bolsheselsky District, Yaroslavl Oblast, a village in Novoselsky Rural Okrug of Bolsheselsky District
- Semenkovo, Lyubimsky District, Yaroslavl Oblast, a village in Osetsky Rural Okrug of Lyubimsky District
- Semenkovo, Okhotinsky Rural Okrug, Myshkinsky District, Yaroslavl Oblast, a village in Okhotinsky Rural Okrug of Myshkinsky District
- Semenkovo, Povodnevsky Rural Okrug, Myshkinsky District, Yaroslavl Oblast, a village in Povodnevsky Rural Okrug of Myshkinsky District
- Semenkovo, Rostovsky District, Yaroslavl Oblast, a village in Karashsky Rural Okrug of Rostovsky District
- Semenkovo, Rybinsky District, Yaroslavl Oblast, a village in Ogarkovsky Rural Okrug of Rybinsky District
- Semenkovo, Golovinsky Rural Okrug, Uglichsky District, Yaroslavl Oblast, a village in Golovinsky Rural Okrug of Uglichsky District
- Semenkovo, Putchinsky Rural Okrug, Uglichsky District, Yaroslavl Oblast, a village in Putchinsky Rural Okrug of Uglichsky District
- Semenkovo, Vasilevsky Rural Okrug, Uglichsky District, Yaroslavl Oblast, a village in Vasilevsky Rural Okrug of Uglichsky District

== Renamed localities ==
- Semyonkovo, until 2011, name of Semyonkovo-na-Koryoge, a village in Tsentralnoye Settlement of Buysky District, Kostroma Oblast
