= Nikolay Tikhomirov (politician) =

Russian politician (1952–2026)

Nikolai Tikhomirov
- Николай Тихомиров
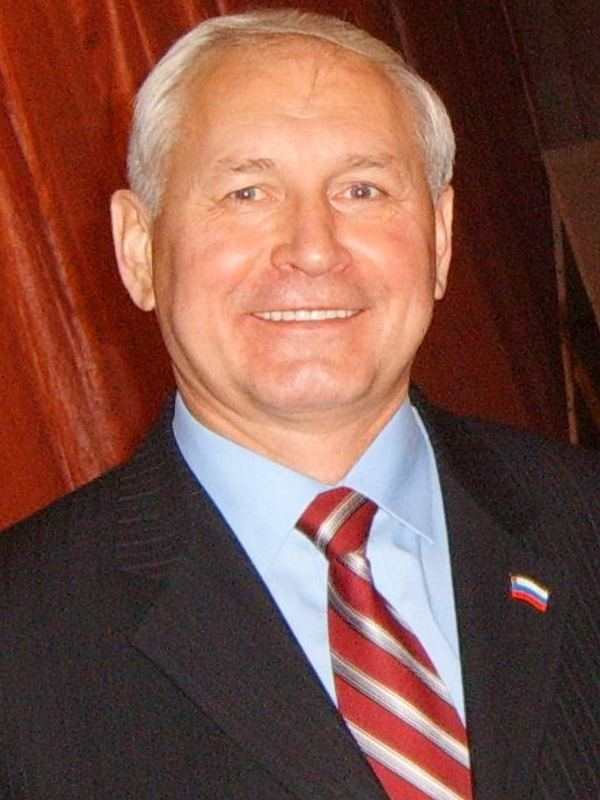
- Tikhomirov in 2007

Member of the Federation Council from Vologda Oblast
- In office 10 February 2012 – 19 September 2019
- Preceded by: Valery Fyodorov
- Succeeded by: Yelena Avdeyeva

Chairman of the Legislative Assembly of Vologda Oblast
- In office December 2001 – December 2011
- Preceded by: Gennady Khripel
- Succeeded by: Georgiy Shevtsov

Personal details
- Born: 12 January 1952 Sheksninsky District, Vologda Oblast, Russian SFSR, Soviet Union
- Died: 11 February 2026 (aged 74)

Nikolay Vasilyevich Tikhomirov (Russian: Николай Васильевич Тихомиров; 12 January 1952 – 11 February 2026) was a Russian politician. He was a senator from 2012 to 2019. Tikhomirov died on 11 February 2026, at the age of 74.
