= Yevgeny Bogomazov =

- Евгений Богомазов
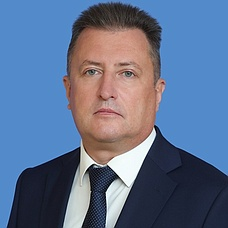

Senator from Vologda Oblast
- Incumbent
- Assumed office 26 September 2024
- Preceded by: Oleg Kuvshinnikov

Personal details
- Born: 17 April 1970 (age 56) Cherepovets, Russia, Soviet Union
- Party: United Russia
- Education: MVD Academy of Management; Volgograd State Pedagogical Institute

Yevgeny Artemovich Bogomazov (Russian: Евгений Артёмович Богомазов; born April 17, 1970, in Chagoda, Vologda Oblast) is a Russian politician, senator of the Federation Council and member of the Federation Council Committee on Science, Education, and Culture. He is a member of United Russia party.

== Biography ==
He was born April 17, 1970, in the settlement of Chagoda, Vologda Oblast. He graduated from the Volgograd State Pedagogical Institute in 1994, majoring in history.

In 2009, he graduated from the MVD Academy of Management with a degree in jurisprudence. From 1992 to 1993, he was a history teacher and deputy director for educational work at the Dedovopolskaya Junior Secondary School in the village of Borisovo, Chagodoshchensky District, Vologda Oblast.

From 1993 to 2014, he served in the internal affairs agencies of the Vologda Oblast. He held the positions of Chief of the Syamzhensky District Department of Internal Affairs and Chief of the Sheksninsky District Department of Internal Affairs. He retired in April 2014 from his position as Chief of the Vologda City Department of the Ministry of Internal Affairs with the rank of police colonel due to length of service.

On June 29, 2014, he was elected Head of the Sheksninsky Municipal District. On March 20, 2017, he was appointed Deputy Governor of the Vologda Oblast.

On September 26, 2024 by Decree No. 294 of the Governor of Vologda Oblast, he was granted the powers of a Senator of the Russian Federation – a representative of the executive body of state power of the Vologda Oblast.
