= Krasavino =

Krasavino (Russian: Красавино) is the name of several inhabited localities in Russia.

Urban localities

- Krasavino, Veliky Ustyug, Vologda Oblast, a town under the administrative jurisdiction of the town of oblast significance of Veliky Ustyug in Vologda Oblast

Rural localities

- Krasavino, Kotlassky District, Arkhangelsk Oblast, a village in Zabelinsky Selsoviet of Kotlassky District in Arkhangelsk Oblast
- Krasavino, Krasnoborsky District, Arkhangelsk Oblast, a village in Belosludsky Selsoviet of Krasnoborsky District in Arkhangelsk Oblast
- Krasavino, Vilegodsky District, Arkhangelsk Oblast, a village in Pavlovsky Selsoviet of Vilegodsky District in Arkhangelsk Oblast
- Krasavino, Milofanovsky Selsoviet, Nikolsky District, Vologda Oblast, a village in Milofanovsky Selsoviet of Nikolsky District in Vologda Oblast
- Krasavino, Niginsky Selsoviet, Nikolsky District, Vologda Oblast, a village in Niginsky Selsoviet of Nikolsky District in Vologda Oblast
- Krasavino, Verkhnekemsky Selsoviet, Nikolsky District, Vologda Oblast, a village in Verkhnekemsky Selsoviet of Nikolsky District in Vologda Oblast
- Krasavino, Zelentsovsky Selsoviet, Nikolsky District, Vologda Oblast, a village in Zelentsovsky Selsoviet of Nikolsky District in Vologda Oblast
- Krasavino, Nyuksensky District, Vologda Oblast, a village in Dmitriyevsky Selsoviet of Nyuksensky District in Vologda Oblast
- Krasavino, Velikoustyugsky District, Vologda Oblast, a village in Samotovinsky Selsoviet of Velikoustyugsky District in Vologda Oblast
