= Yelena Avdeyeva =

Russian politician (1968–2023)

- Елена Авдеева
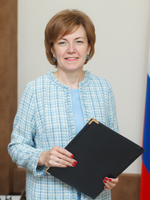
- Avdeyeva in 2019

Russian Federation Senator from Vologda Oblast
- In office 19 September 2019 – 29 August 2023
- Preceded by: Nikolay Tikhomirov
- Succeeded by: Olga Danilova

Mayor of Cherepovets
- In office 14 September 2017 – 19 September 2019
- Preceded by: Yury Kuzin
- Succeeded by: Dmitry Lavrov (acting)

Personal details
- Born: Yelena Osipovna Avdeyeva; 19 July 1968 Cherepovets, Vologda Oblast, Russian SFSR, USSR
- Died: 29 August 2023 (aged 55)
- Party: United Russia

Yelena Osipovna Avdeyeva (Russian: Елена Осиповна Авдеева; 19 July 1968 – 29 August 2023) was a Russian politician who served as a Member of the Federation Council - representative of the executive authority of the Vologda Oblast from 19 September 2019 until her death.

Avdeyeva served as the mayor of Cherepovets from 2017 to 2019.

== Early life and education ==
Avdeyeva was born on 19 July 1968 in Cherepovets.

In 1992, she graduated from Saint Petersburg State University of Economics and Finance.

== Career in tax administration ==
From 1987, she worked in the tax inspectorate of the Cherepovets region. By 1997, she held the position of Deputy Head of the Department of Taxation of Citizens.

Between 1997 and 1999, she served as Deputy Head of the Department of Personal Income Taxation of the State Tax Inspectorate for Cherepovets. From 1999 to 2005, she was Deputy Head of the Inspectorate of the Federal Tax Service of Russia for Cherepovets.

== Municipal administration of Cherepovets ==
In 2005, Avdeyeva was appointed Deputy General Director of LLC Central Consulting Service for Taxes of the Vologda Region by Mayor Yury Kuzin.

From 2006 to 2012, during Oleg Kuvshinnikov's tenure as mayor, she headed the Department of Urban Economy and Trade of Cherepovets. From 2012 to 2017, she served as Deputy Mayor of Cherepovets, overseeing social issues.

On 14 September 2017, Avdeyeva was appointed Mayor of Cherepovets after passing the competitive selection for the city manager position.

== Federation Council ==
On 19 September 2019, following the re-election of Governor Oleg Kuvshinnikov, Avdeyeva was appointed as the representative of the executive authority of Vologda Oblast in the Federation Council.

== Death ==
Yelena Avdeyeva died on 29 August 2023 at the age of 55.

== Awards ==
6 June 2023 - Order for Merit to the Fatherland, II degree.

== Sanctions ==
On March 23, 2022, amid Russia's invasion of Ukraine, she was added to Canada's sanctions list of “regime associates” for contributing to the violation of Ukraine's sovereignty and territorial integrity.

On September 30, 2022, she was included in the United States sanctions list “for Putin’s annexation of Ukrainian regions” and for supporting the law on so-called “fake news”.

On December 16, 2022, she was added to the European Union sanctions list for “supporting and implementing actions and policies that undermine the territorial integrity, sovereignty, and independence of Ukraine, and that further destabilize Ukraine”.

For similar reasons, she has also been under sanctions imposed by the United Kingdom, Switzerland, Ukraine, and New Zealand.
