= List of chairmen of the Legislative Assembly of Vologda Oblast =

The chairman of the Legislative Assembly of Vologda Oblast is the presiding officer of that legislature.

== Chairmen ==
Name	Took office	Left office
Gennady Khripel	April 1994	September 1995
Gury Sudakov	September 1995	February 1996
Gennady Khripel	February 1996	December 2001
Nikolay Tikhomirov	December 2001	December 2011
Georgy Shevtsov	December 2011	Present
