= Krasavino, Nyuksensky District, Vologda Oblast =

Krasavino Красавино
- Village
- Location within Vologda Oblast Location within Russia
- Coordinates: 60°28′N 44°28′E
- Country: Russia
- Region: Vologda Oblast
- District: Nyuksensky District
- Time zone: UTC+3:00

Krasavino (Russian: Красавино) is a rural locality (a village) in Nyuksenskoye Rural Settlement, Nyuksensky District, Vologda Oblast, Russia. The population was 119 as of 2002. There are 4 streets.

== Geography ==
Krasavino is located 37 km northeast of Nyuksenitsa (the district's administrative centre) by road. Gora is the nearest rural locality.
