= Semenkovo, Totemsky District, Vologda Oblast =

Semenkovo Семенково
- Village
- Location within Vologda Oblast Location within Russia
- Coordinates: 59°41′N 42°02′E
- Country: Russia
- Region: Vologda Oblast
- District: Totemsky District
- Time zone: UTC+3:00

Semenkovo (Russian: Семенково) is a rural locality (a village) in Pogorelovskoye Rural Settlement, Totemsky District, Vologda Oblast, Russia. The population was 11 as of 2002.

== Geography ==
Semenkovo is located 57 km southwest of Totma (the district's administrative centre) by road. Boyarskoye is the nearest rural locality.
