= Governor of Vologda Oblast =

Highest-ranking official in Vologda Oblast, Russia

- Coat of arms of Vologda Oblast

- Incumbent; Georgy Filimonov since 26 September 2024
- Seat: Vologda
- Term length: 5 years
- Constituting instrument: Charter of Vologda Oblast, Section 5
- Inaugural holder: Nikolay Podgornov
- Formation: 1991
- Website: vologda-oblast.ru/en/

The Governor of Vologda Oblast (Russian: Губернатор Вологодской области) is the head of government of Vologda Oblast, a federal subject of Russia.

The position was introduced in 1991 as Head of Administration of Vologda Oblast. The Governor is elected by direct popular vote for a term of five years.

== List of officeholders ==
No.	Portrait	Governor	Tenure	Time in office	Party	Election
1		Nikolay Podgornov (1949–2026)	24 October 1991 – 23 March 1996 (removed)	4 years, 151 days	Independent	Appointed
—		Vyacheslav Pozgalyov (1946–2026)	23 March 1996 – 3 June 1996	3 years, 270 days	Independent → Our Home – Russia	Acting
2		Vyacheslav Pozgalyov (1946–2026)	3 June 1996 – 18 December 1999 (resigned) (Note: In September 1999, Pozgalyov announced his intention to resign in order to hold a snap gubernatorial election coinciding with the 1999 Russian legislative election. His resignation took effect on 18 December, one day before the vote.)	3 years, 270 days	Independent → Our Home – Russia	Appointed 1996
—		Nikolay Kostygov (born 1949)	18 December 1999 – 24 December 1999 (successor took office)	6 days	Independent	Acting
(2)		Vyacheslav Pozgalyov (1946–2026)	24 December 1999 – 14 December 2011 (resigned)	11 years, 355 days (Note: Total: 15 years, 260 days.)	NDR → Unity → United Russia	1999; 2003; 2007 (Note: Appointed by the president of Russia with the consent of the Legislative Assembly of Vologda Oblast.)
—		Oleg Kuvshinnikov (born 1965)	14 December 2011 – 28 December 2011	11 years, 321 days	United Russia	Acting
3		Oleg Kuvshinnikov (born 1965)	28 December 2011 – 17 May 2014 (resigned)	11 years, 321 days	United Russia	2011
—		Oleg Kuvshinnikov (born 1965)	17 May 2014 – 23 September 2014	11 years, 321 days	United Russia	Acting
(3)		Oleg Kuvshinnikov (born 1965)	23 September 2014 – 31 October 2023 (resigned)	11 years, 321 days	United Russia	2014; 2019
—		Georgy Filimonov (born 1980)	31 October 2023 – 26 September 2024	2 years, 356 days	Independent → United Russia	Acting
4		Georgy Filimonov (born 1980)	26 September 2024 – present	2 years, 356 days	Independent → United Russia	2024
