= Gennady Khripel =

Russian politician (1949–2024)

- Геннадий Хрипель
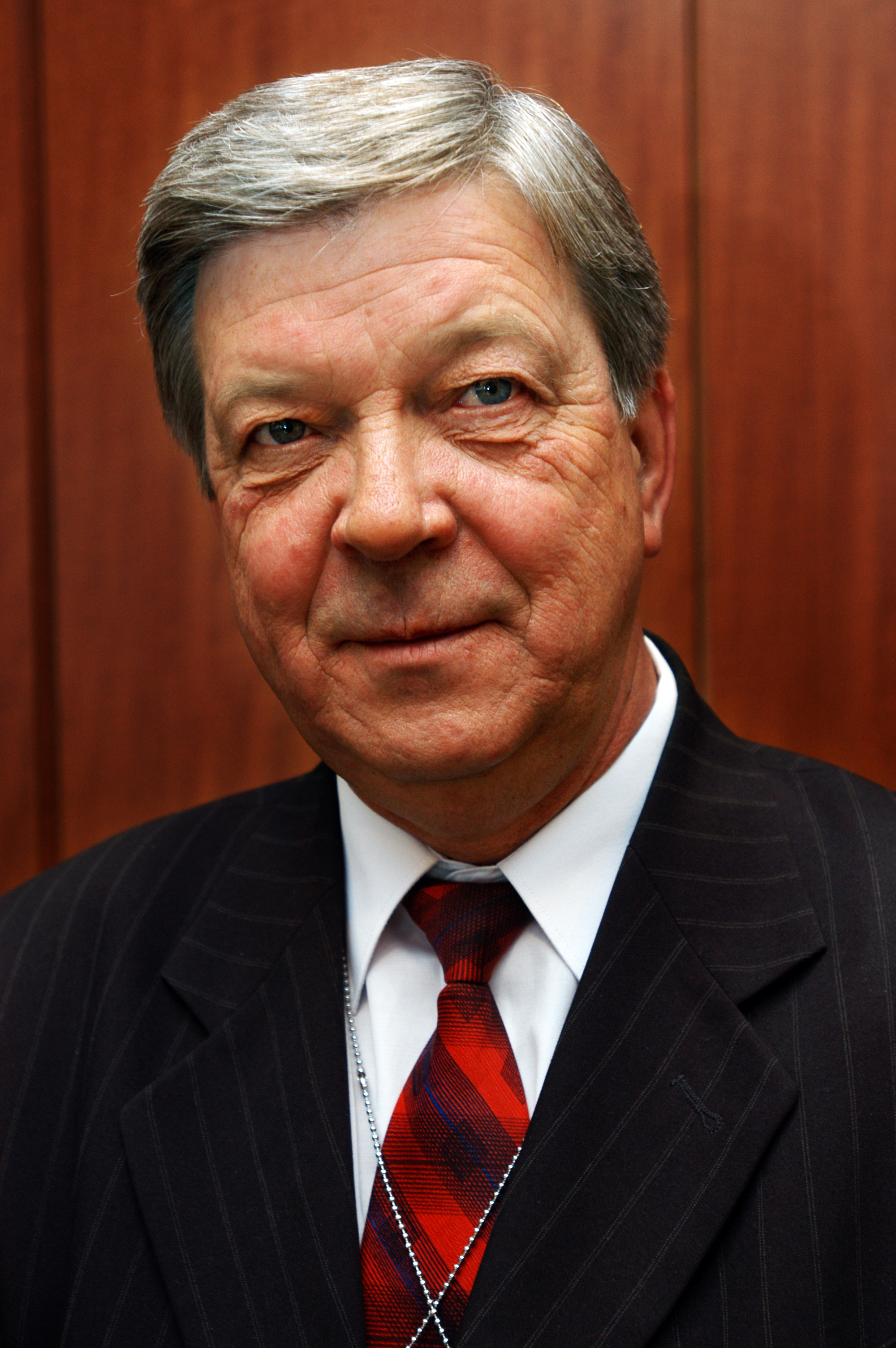
- Khripel in 2005

Member of the Federation Council of Russia
- In office January 1996 – May 2007
- Succeeded by: Yuri Vorobyov

Chairman of the Legislative Assembly of Vologda Oblast
- In office February 1996 – December 2001
- Preceded by: G. V. Sudakov
- Succeeded by: Nikolai Tikhomirov
- In office April 1994 – September 1995
- Preceded by: position established
- Succeeded by: G. V. Sudakov

Personal details
- Born: Gennady Timofeyevich Khripel; 12 April 1949 Chudovo, Novgorod Oblast, Russian SFSR, USSR
- Died: 1 April 2024 (aged 74)
- Party: SRZP
- Education: Yaroslav Mudryi National Law University
- Occupation: Electrician

Gennady Timofeyevich Khripel (Russian: Генна́дий Тимофе́евич Хри́пель; 12 April 1949 – 1 April 2024) was a Russian politician. A member of A Just Russia – For Truth, he served in the Federation Council from 1996 to 2007.

Khripel died on 1 April 2024, at the age of 74.

== Biography ==
Gennady Khripel was born on April 12, 1949 in the town of Chudovo, Novgorod oblast. After graduating from school, in 1966, he began working as an electrician at the Sukhonsky pulp and paper mill. From 1968 to 1970 he served in the Soviet Army. Having served in the army, he returned to the mill and continued working as an electrician. In 1974 he became the chief engineer of Sokolsky bread receiving enterprise.

In 1978 he graduated from Kharkov Law Institute with a degree in law (on-the-job training).

From 1977 to 1989 he worked as an investigator at the Sokolsky inter-district prosecutor's office, then as a prosecutor of the Vashkinsky and Babaevsky districts of the Vologda Oblast.

=== Political career ===
From 1989 to 1990 he was First Secretary of the Babaevsky District Committee of the CPSU. In 1990-1991 he worked as deputy chairman, and in 1993-1994 – as chairman of the Vologda Regional Congress of People's Deputies.

In the 1994 elections he was elected a deputy of the Legislative Assembly of Vologda Oblast, in April of the same year he was elected as Chairman of the Legislative Assembly of Vologda Oblast by secret ballot.

On November 19, 1994 he was elected the first ever Chairman of the Parliamentary Assembly of the North-West of Russia, created on the initiative of the Legislative Assembly of the Vologda Oblast. In September 1995 he resigned from the post of Chairman of the Legislative Assembly of the Vologda Oblast, and in February 1996 he was re-elected to this post.

In January 1996 he became a member of the Federation Council of the Russian Federation. In March 1996 he became a member of the Federation Council Committee on International Affairs.

In the elections of March 22, 1998 he was again elected as a deputy of the Legislative Assembly of the region, on April 15 of the same year at the organizational session he was again elected Chairman of the Legislative Assembly of the Vologda region.

In December 2001 he resigned as a deputy and Chairman of the Legislative Assembly of the Vologda Oblast in connection with continuing his work as its representative in the Federation Council of the Federal Assembly of the Russian Federation.

From January to October 2002 he was a member of the Federation Council Committee on International Affairs, since October 2002 – deputy chairman of the Federation Council Committee on International Affairs, since October 2006 – member of the Federation Council Commission on National Maritime Policy.

In 2006–2009 he was the Chairman of the Council of the regional branch of the Just Russia in the Vologda Oblast.
