= Krasavino, Velikoustyugsky District, Vologda Oblast =

Krasavino Красавино
- Village
- Location within Vologda Oblast Location within Russia
- Coordinates: 60°40′N 45°52′E
- Country: Russia
- Region: Vologda Oblast
- District: Velikoustyugsky District
- Time zone: UTC+3:00

Krasavino (Russian: Красавино) is a rural locality (a village) in Samotovinskoye Rural Settlement, Velikoustyugsky District, Vologda Oblast, Russia. The population was 49 as of 2002.

== Geography ==
Krasavino is located 42 km southwest of Veliky Ustyug (the district's administrative centre) by road. Vlasovo is the nearest rural locality.
