= Nikolay Podgornov (politician) =

Russian politician (1949–2026)

- Николай Подгорнов
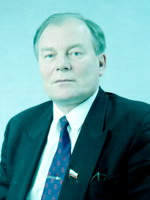
- Podgornov in 2008

1st Governor of Vologda Oblast
- In office 24 October 1991 – 23 March 1996
- Succeeded by: Vyacheslav Pozgalyov

Personal details
- Born: 15 May 1949 Lezhdom, Vologda Oblast, Russian SFSR, Soviet Union
- Died: 12 September 2026 (aged 77) Vologda, Russia
- Party: Our Home – Russia
- Children: 2

Nikolay Mikhailovich Podgornov (Russian: Николай Михайлович Подгорнов; 15 May 1949 – 12 September 2026) was a Russian politician who served as the 1st Governor of Vologda Oblast from 1991 to 1996.

== Life and career ==
=== Early life and education ===
Nikolay Podgornov was born on 15 May 1949 in the village of Lezhdom, Gryazovetsky District, Vologda Oblast, to a Russian family. His grandfathers were rural doctors. His father worked in the NKVD, the Soviet interior ministry and secret police.

In 1965, he graduated from GPTU-4 in the city of Veliky Ustyug and was a ship's engineer-helmsman-mechanic.

=== Labor activity ===
Podgornov worked as a second assistant to a mechanic at a ship repair plant, as a minder-sailor of a motor ship of the Kotlas River Shipping Company, as a mechanic at the Sidorovsky state farm in the Gryazovets region.

In 1969, he was elected executive secretary of the Komsomol organization of the Demyanovsky state farm. From 1971 to 1973, he served in the army, where he joined the CPSU, as the member until the end of 1990. After demobilization, he worked as chairman of the trade union committee and secretary of the Komsomol committee of the Zarya collective farm in the Gryazovets district.

From 1976 to 1979 he was the director of the Demyanovsky state farm, and between 1979 and 1990 he was the director of the Avrora state farm in the Gryazovets district.

He was a member of the bureau of the Vologda regional committee of the CPSU. He graduated from the All-Union Correspondence Institute of Law.

In 1988, he was elected a delegate to the XIX Conference of the CPSU. From 1990 to 1993, he was a People's Deputy of Russia for the Sokol Territorial District No. 332 of the Vologda Region, and was a member of the Supreme Economic Council under the Presidium of the Supreme Council of Russia.

=== Politics ===
On 24 October 1991, Podgornov was appointed head of administration of Vologda Oblast by decree of the President of the RSFSR. In 1992, he twice refused the post of Minister of Agriculture of Russia the ministry has offered to him.

In the summer of 1993, Podgornov participated in the work of the Constitutional Conference. In September 1993, he was one of the initiators of the creation of the "Vologda Republic".

In 1993, he was elected a member of the Federation Council for the Vologda dual-mandate constituency No. 35. He was included in the list of support for the Choice of Russia bloc.

In 1996, he was ex officio a member of the Federation Council, was a member of the Committee on Federation Affairs, the Federal Treaty and Regional Policy.

In February 1996, a criminal case was initiated against him in connection with the 1996 presidential elections in Russia and the election campaign of Boris Yeltsin. On 23 March, he was temporarily removed from office and on 17 May 1996, he was officially removed from office.

In October 1996, he took part in the gubernatorial elections, and took fourth place.

In November 1996, Podgornov was arrested on unproven charges of bribery, embezzlement, abuse of office, and tax evasion. In 1998, the Vologda Regional Court, having considered the case of Podgornov, issued an acquittal on 19 counts out of 20 that appeared in the indictment. Recognizing the guilt of the ex-governor on the fact of the illegal acquisition of equipment and parts for the jeep provided for his use, on 2 December 1998, the court sentenced him to one year of probation. In May 1999, the Supreme Court of Russia overturned the verdict of the regional court, and in October 1999, Podgornov was sentenced to 7 years in prison and taken into custody. In 2000, he was released under an amnesty.

Podgornov retired from political activity, went into business, was the general director of the Northern Farm agricultural company. In September 2014, he filed for his own bankruptcy. The claim was granted in full. In March 2015, a new criminal case was opened against him under Part 2 of Article 199.1 of the Criminal Code of Russia for failure to fulfill the duties of a tax agent. According to the investigating authorities in the Vologda Oblast, from 1 April 2011 to 30 November 2012, he withheld more than 11 million rubles of income tax from his employees without transferring them to the budget. With this money, he settled with three firms in which he himself was the founder.

=== Personal life and death ===
Podgornov was married and had two children. He died at Vologda Regional Hospital on 12 September 2026, at the age of 77.
