= Sukhonsky =

Sukhonsky Сухонский
- Settlement
- Location within Vologda Oblast Location within Russia
- Coordinates: 60°36′N 45°21′E
- Country: Russia
- Region: Vologda Oblast
- District: Velikoustyugsky District
- Time zone: UTC+3:00

Sukhonsky (Russian: Сухонский) is a rural locality (a settlement) in Opokskoye Rural Settlement, Velikoustyugsky District, Vologda Oblast, Russia. The population was 172 as of 2002. There are 6 streets.

== Geography ==
Sukhonsky is located 120 km southwest of Veliky Ustyug (the district's administrative centre) by road. Poldarsa is the nearest rural locality.
