= Semenkovo, Oktyabrsky Selsoviet, Vologodsky District, Vologda Oblast =

Semenkovo Семёнково
- Village
- Location within Vologda Oblast Location within Russia
- Coordinates: 59°17′N 39°04′E
- Country: Russia
- Region: Vologda Oblast
- District: Vologodsky District
- Time zone: UTC+3:00

Semenkovo (Russian: Семёнково) is a rural locality (a village) in Mayskoye Rural Settlement, Vologodsky District, Vologda Oblast, Russia. The population was 1 as of 2002.

== Geography ==
The distance to Vologda is 6. Khrenovo ,Yagody(beryes)is the nearest locality. there are 12 villages of Semenkovo in the region, to avoid misunderstandings, the village can be called the Museum of Architecture without Semenkovo
