= Semenkovo, Goncharovsky Selsoviet, Vologodsky District, Vologda Oblast =

Semenkovo Семёнково
- Village
- Location within Vologda Oblast Location within Russia
- Coordinates: 59°17′N 39°33′E
- Country: Russia
- Region: Vologda Oblast
- District: Vologodsky District
- Time zone: UTC+3:00

Semenkovo (Russian: Семёнково) is a rural locality (a village) in Mayskoye Rural Settlement, Vologodsky District, Vologda Oblast, Russia. The population was 4 as of 2002.

== Geography ==
Semenkovo is located 22 km northwest of Vologda (the district's administrative centre) by road. Zarya, Kovylevo is the nearest locality. creek Mesha
