= Semenkovo, Semenkovsky Selsoviet, Vologodsky District, Vologda Oblast =

Semenkovo Семёнково
- Settlement
- Location within Vologda Oblast Location within Russia
- Coordinates: 59°14′N 39°51′E
- Country: Russia
- Region: Vologda Oblast
- District: Vologodsky District
- Time zone: UTC+3:00

Semenkovo (Russian: Семёнково) is a rural locality (a settlement) and the administrative center of Semenkovskoye Rural Settlement, Vologodsky District, Vologda Oblast, Russia. The population was 1,233 as of 2002. There are 16 streets.

== Geography ==
The distance to Vologda is 8 km (5.0 mi). Barachevo is the nearest rural locality.
