= Semenkovo, Ivanovo Oblast =

Semenkovo Семенково
- Village
- Location within Ivanovo Oblast Location within Russia
- Coordinates: 57°20′N 42°08′E
- Country: Russia
- Region: Ivanovo Oblast
- District: Kineshemsky District
- Time zone: UTC+3:00

Semenkovo (Russian: Семенково) is a rural locality (a village) in Kineshemsky District, Ivanovo Oblast, Russia. Population: 7 (2010 census);

== Geography ==
This rural locality is located 12 kilometres (7.5 mi) from Kineshma (the district's administrative centre), 81 kilometres (50 mi) from Ivanovo (capital of Ivanovo Oblast) and 324 kilometres (201 mi) from Moscow. Yermachikha is the nearest rural locality.
