= Georgy Filimonov =

Russian politician (born 1980)

- Георгий Филимонов
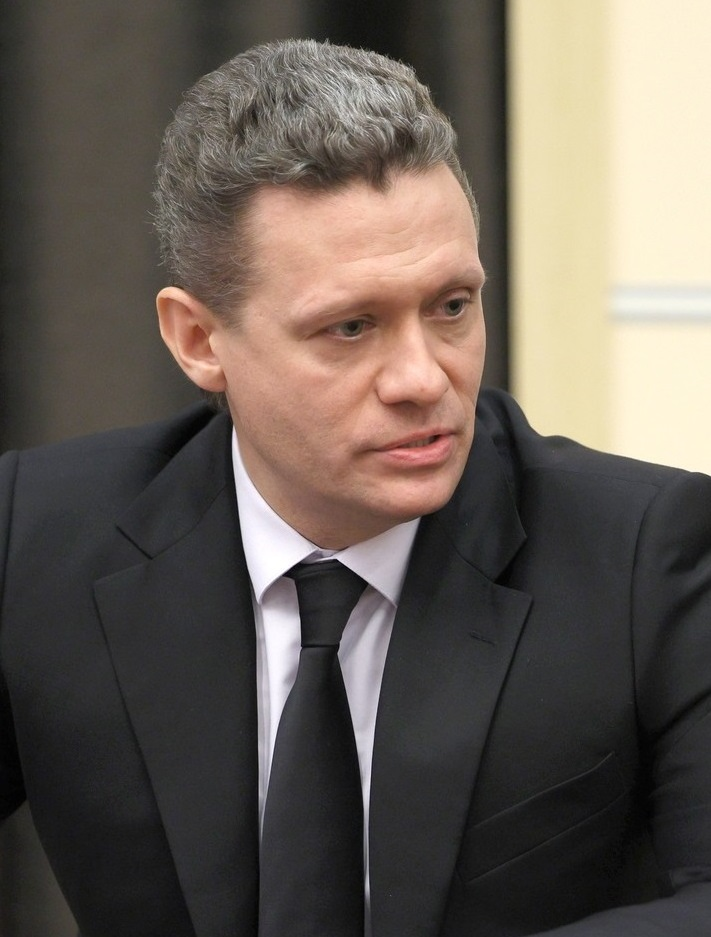
- Filimonov in 2023

4th Governor of Vologda Oblast
- Incumbent
- Assumed office 26 September 2024; Acting: 31 October 2023 – 26 September 2024
- Preceded by: Oleg Kuvshinnikov

Deputy Chairman of the Government of Moscow Oblast
- In office November 2021 – 31 October 2023

Personal details
- Born: 2 February 1980 (age 46) Tomsk, Tomsk Oblast, Russian SFSR, Soviet Union
- Party: United Russia
- Other political affiliations: All-Russia People's Front; Izborsky Club
- Education: Peoples' Friendship University of Russia

Georgy Yuryevich Filimonov (Russian: Георгий Юрьевич Филимонов; born 23 February 1980) is a Russian politician and former kickboxer who is the Governor of Vologda Oblast since 31 October 2023. He previously served as Deputy Chairman of the government of Moscow Oblast from 2021 to 2023. As Governor of Vologda Oblast, Filimonov has pursued conservative policies, including restricting abortion and the sale of alcohol.

== Early life and career ==
Georgy Filimonov was born on 23 February 1980 in Tomsk. A year after his birth, the Filimonov family moved to Cherepovets, Vologda Oblast. His father, Yury, is the director of the Cherepovets Martial Arts Center, Honored Kickboxing Trainer of the Russian Federation, and a former member of the Cherepovets City Duma. He trained with Sergey Kiriyenko, the current first deputy head of the Presidential Administration of the Russian Federation. His mother, Irina, is the artistic director and director of the Theater for Children and Youth of Cherepovets.

Since his childhood, under the guidance of his father, Filimonov has been involved in martial arts, including wushu and kickboxing. In 1999, he won a gold medal at the W.A.K.O. World Championships 1999 in Caorle, Italy in the "Musical Forms" category (imaginary wrestling in which the performer uses martial arts techniques to music). In 2001, at a similar competition in Maribor, Slovenia, Filimonov placed third. He was awarded the title of Master of Sports of Russia in 2001.

In 2003, Filimonov graduated from the Faculty of Humanities and Social Sciences of the Peoples' Friendship University of Russia with a degree in international relations. In 2007, he defended his PhD thesis at the Institute of the US and Canada of the Russian Academy of Sciences on the topic "US Foreign Cultural Policy as a Component of Soft Power." In 2013, he defended his doctoral dissertation at the Diplomatic Academy of the Ministry of Foreign Affairs of the Russian Federation on the topic "The Role of Soft Power in US Foreign Policy."

Since November 2009, Filimonov has been an associate professor at the Department of Theory and History of International Relations at the Peoples' Friendship University of Russia. Since January 2011, he has also served as the university's Deputy Head of the Department of Theory and History of International Relations. From 2014 to 2017, he was director of the Peoples' Friendship University's Institute of Strategic Studies and Forecasts, as well as a professor at the department of theory and history of international relations.

== Political career ==
From 2005 to 2006, Filimonov was an employee of the secretariat of the organizing committee for the preparation and support of Russia's chairmanship of the G8. From 2005 to 2009, he held the position of adviser in the foreign policy department of the Administration of the President of the Russian Federation.

Since October 2009, he had been the Deputy General Director of Soglasie CJSC for foreign economic cooperation.

Filimonov has been a member of the Izborsky Club since 2016. He is described as politically being ultra-conservative and ultra-patriotic. During the 2014 pro-Russian unrest in Ukraine, Filimonov exchanged emails with Kirill Shamalov (at the time son-in-law of President Vladimir Putin) arguing that a full-scale invasion of Ukraine was needed. He additionally claimed that the 2015 assassination of Boris Nemtsov was organised by Russia's enemies to start a "colour revolution".

Since 2017, he worked as an assistant in the Department of the Presidential Administration of the Russian Federation for Domestic Policy.

In November 2021, Filimonov was appointed as the Deputy Chairman of the Government of the Moscow Oblast.

=== Governor of Vologda Oblast ===
On 31 October 2023, President Vladimir Putin appointed Filimonov as acting governor of Vologda Oblast, replacing Oleg Kuvshinnikov. Filimonov was elected in his own right the next year, winning 62.30% of the vote.

Filimonov's governance has been marked by promotion of ultra-conservative ideology, turning Vologda Oblast into an "ideological experiment", as described by the website Russian Election Monitor. His government has rewritten school curricula to promote nationalistic and militaristic themes, and Russian Election Monitor has said that he has established a centralised system of governance based on "unwavering allegiance" from low-level bureaucrats. Filimonov has frequently praised Joseph Stalin, and has a portrait of Stalin in his office, along with Lavrentiy Beria, Felix Dzerzhinsky and Mao Zedong.

Filimonov has described the "rebirth of the Russian North" as his top priority, according to independent newspaper Novaya Gazeta, and he has advocated for a total ban on abortion in Vologda Oblast. In late 2023 he signed a law making it illegal to encourage abortion. Under his government, with the support of the Russian Orthodox Church, abortion has been de facto banned in the region, although Russian law prevents the banning of abortion. Filimonov has also pursued the prohibition of alcohol, restricting sales to between 12:00 and 14:00 from 1 March 2025.

Filimonov has frequently criticised steel and mining company Severstal, which is politically and economically dominant in Vologda Oblast. He has blamed Severstal's leadership for making Cherepovets one of the most polluted cities in Russia, accused its leadership of failing to invest in the local economy and condemned the "mass influx" of migrant workers to Cherepovets Steel Mill. Filimonov challenged Severstal's owner, Alexei Mordashov, to a fight, and signed a decree on 27 February 2025 banning all migrant workers from the regional construction sector throughout 2025. A week after signing the decree banning migrant workers, Filimonov revoked it, and he has since offered to "bury the hatchet" with Mordashov, though he has also condemned Severstal for a "quasi-liberal orientation".

== Personal life and image, criticism ==
Filimonov is known for his eccentric personality, and he has been compared to the oprichniki of Ivan the Terrible. Filimonov has embraced these comparisons as part of his public image, frequently wearing a black cape and robe similar to those worn by the oprichniki. He is also known to be fond of Mao suits and social media. Filimonov is a follower of the Slavic Native Faith, and has said in an interview that he has a sacred name, given in accordance with the "Slavic pre-Christian tradition," which is hidden from others.

In 2025, a complaint was sent to President Vladimir Putin by at least 120 residents of Vologda Oblast accusing Filimonov of publicly praising Joseph Stalin, driving businesses away by imposing a ban on alcohol sales, making nationalist statements and conducting frequent personnel changes in local offices, including the city council of Cherepovets. Exiled politician Yevgeny Domozhirov, also from Vologda Oblast, has accused Filimonov of "aggressively pushing these ideas of Russian fascism", specifically highlighting his support for far-right philosopher Aleksandr Dugin and ultranationalist writer Alexander Prokhanov.

He is married to his wife, Irina, a former dancer. They have two daughters, Veleslava and Ladoslava. He speaks English, French and Spanish.
