= Vologda State University =

University in Russia

- Вологодский государственный университет
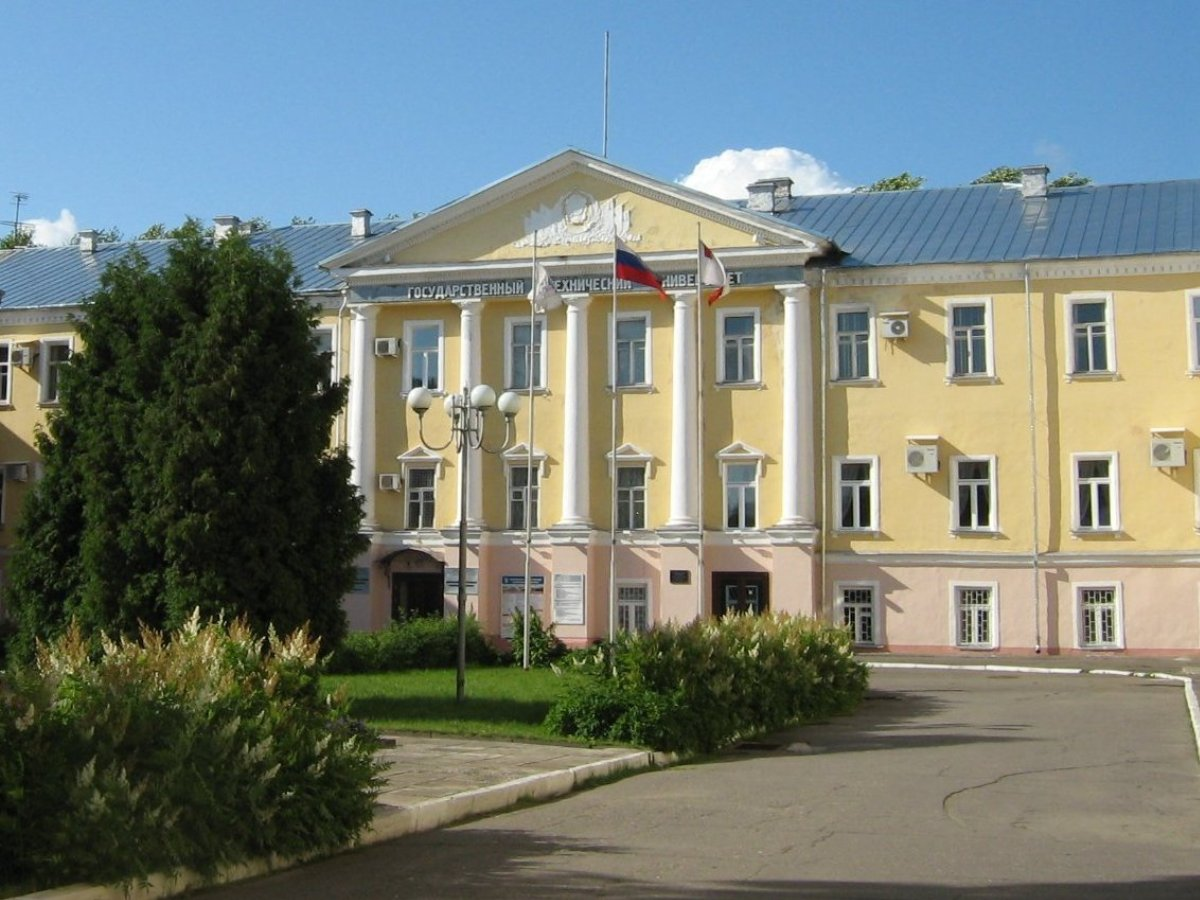
- Type: Public
- Established: 1912 (2016 in current form)
- Location: Vologda, Russia; 59°13′19″N 39°53′47″E
- Campus: Urban
- Nickname: VyaGU (Russian: ВоГУ)
- Website: www.vogu35.ru

Vologda State University (Russian: Федеральное государственное бюджетное образовательное учреждение высшего образования «Вологодский государственный университет» (ВоГУ)) is a public university in Vologda, the capital city of Vologda Oblast in Russia. It was created in its current form in October 2013 with the merger of the Vologda State Pedagogical University and the Vologda State Technical University.

== History ==
=== Vologda State Pedagogical University ===
The Pedagogical Institute was opened in Vologda in 1918 on the basis of the teachers' institute created in 1912. In 1930, the Northern Regional Pedagogical Institute was founded on its basis, renamed the Vologda State Pedagogical Institute by order of the People's Commissariat of Education of the RSFSR dated 07/09/1935 No. 569. In 1940-1957 it was named after Molotov. In 1995 it was transformed into the Vologda State Pedagogical University.

In 1950-1952 one of the founders of Soviet and Russian sociology, Igor Kon, taught at the university six lecture courses.

=== Vologda State Technical University ===
The history of the University began in 1966, and was founded on 15 March 1966 when the General engineering faculty of the North-Western Extramural Polytechnic Institute (NWPI) was founded in Vologda. There was only evening and extramural training at the faculty. In 1967 the faculty was reorganized into the Vologda Branch of the NWPI. There were only 2 faculties: Internal faculty and Evening and Extramural faculty. In 1975 the Vologda Oblast executive committee reorganized the Vologda Branch of the NWPI into the Vologda Polytechnic Institute (VPI). In 1999 the VPI was given the highest accreditive rank of the university. From that point until the merger with the State Pedagogical University it was called the Vologda State Technical University (VSTU).

=== Merger ===
On August 28, 2013, Order No. 1001 of the Russian Ministry of Education and Science was issued which was followed by Order No. 1182 which formalized the two institution's merger into unified entity called Vologda State University.
