= Oleg Kuvshinnikov =

Russian politician (born 1965)

- Олег Кувшинников
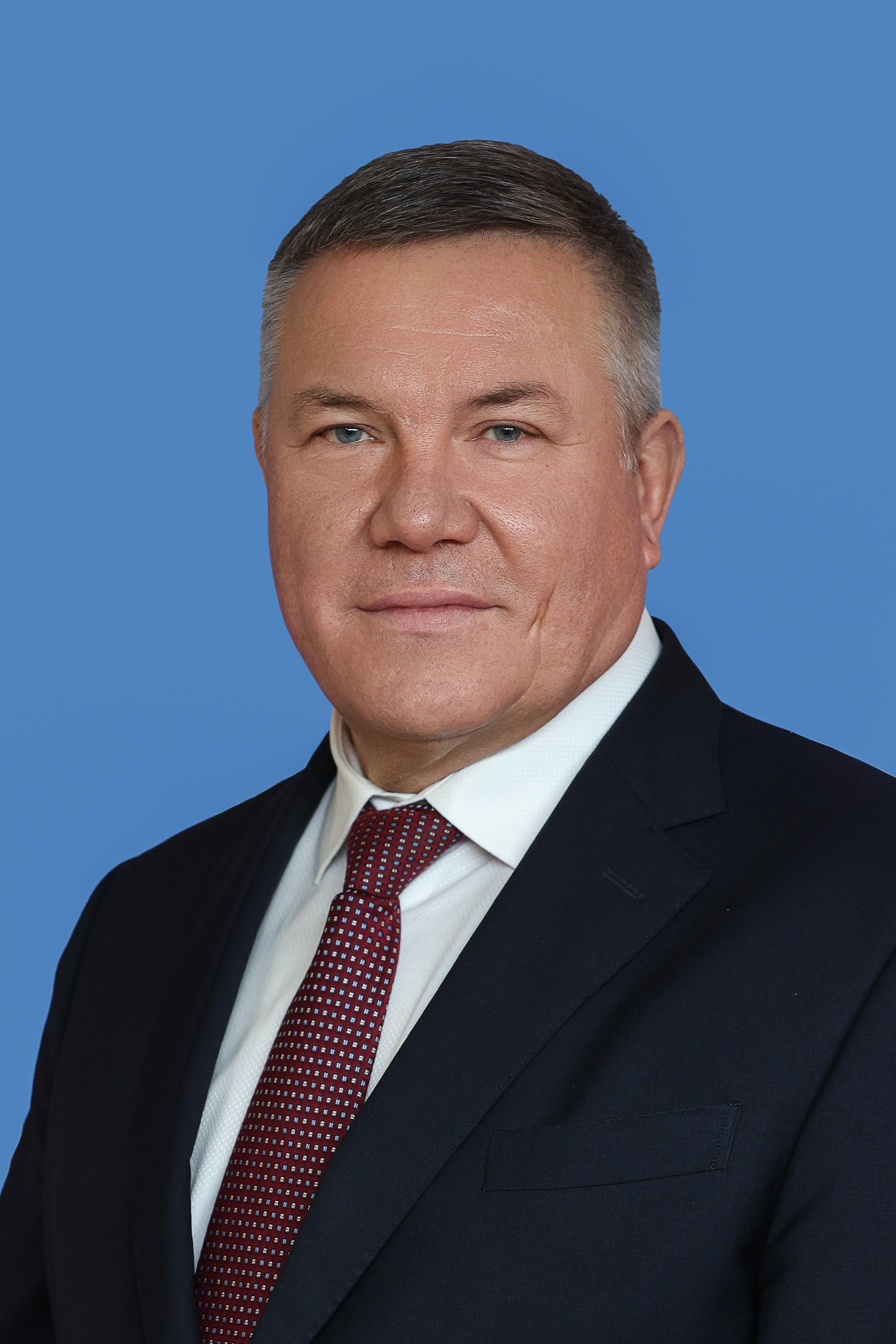
- Official portrait, 2023

3rd Governor of Vologda Oblast
- In office 14 December 2011 – 31 October 2023
- Preceded by: Vyacheslav Pozgalyov
- Succeeded by: Georgy Filimonov

Mayor of Cherepovets
- In office 11 March 2007 – 14 December 2011
- Preceded by: Mikhail Stavrovsky
- Succeeded by: Yury Kuzin

Mayor of Cherepovets (acting)
- In office November 2006 – 11 March 2007

Member of the Cherepovets City Duma
- In office 2002 – November 2006

Personal details
- Born: 2 February 1965 (age 60) Cherepovets, Russia, Soviet Union
- Party: United Russia
- Children: 3

Oleg Aleksandrovich Kuvshinnikov (Russian: Олег Александрович Кувшинников; born 2 February 1965), is a Russian politician who served as the 3rd Governor of Vologda Oblast from 14 December 2011 to 31 October 2023.

He is a member of the United Russia party.

== Biography ==
Oleg Kuvshinnikov was born in Cherepovets on 2 February 1965. His father, Aleksandr Nikolayevich, worked as the chief engineer of the railway transport department of the Severstal company, while his mother, Yelena Ivanovna, is a primary school teacher.

In his childhood and adolescence, he was actively involved in sports. He was a pupil of the SDYUSSHOR in ice hockey of Cherepovets, and was a candidate for the master of sports in hockey.

He graduated from school number 22 in Cherepovets.

In September 1982, he came to work at the Cherepovets Metallurgical Plant in the shop for the repair of coke-chemical equipment of the coke-chemical production as a mechanic for the repair of metallurgical equipment.

From 1985 to 1987, he served in the Soviet Army in the Kemerovo, working in a communications battalion, as a head of the communications equipment, and a secretary of the Komsomol committee of the battalion. His last military rank was a foreman.

In 1987, after serving in the army, he continued to work at the Cherepovets Metallurgical Plant as a rolling mill "250" section rolling shop, where he went through all the stages of production growth.

In 1991, he graduated with honors from the Yaroslavl College of Soviet Trade.

Since 1994, he was a foreman of the section rolling shop, then head of the mill "250", and later promoted as the deputy head of the production shop.

In 1994, he graduated from the St. Petersburg Institute of Trade and Economics.

In 1999, he graduated from the State University of Management in Moscow, under the program "Production Management".

Since 2000, he has been the head of the section rolling shop.

In February 2002, he was appointed theHead of Sheet Rolling Shop No. 1. According to the results of 2003, Rolling Shop No. 1 was recognized as the best subdivision of OAO Severstal.

=== Member of the Cherepovets City Duma ===
From 2002 to 2006, Kuvshinnikov was a member of parliament, a deputy of the Cherepovets City Duma, and was the chairman of the commission on municipal services.

In 2002, he completed a training course under the TOP-100 corporate training program for managers.

From January 2004 to November 2006, he held the position of director of the social and household complex of OAO Severstal.

From 2004 to 2005, he was a member of the Board of Directors of OAO Severstal.

Since 2005, he has been President of the Severstal Basketball Club in Cherepovets.

In 2005, he graduated from the MBA program (Master of Business Administration) at the Academy of National Economy under the Government of the Russian Federation.

=== In the leadership of the city of Cherepovets ===
Since November 2006, he was the First Deputy Mayor of Cherepovets, and was sometimes the acting Mayor at that time.

In March 2007, Kuvshinnikov was elected mayor of Cherepovets, with 65.3% of the vote. He took office on 11 March.

In April 2009, he was elected vice-president of the Union of Cities of the Center and North-West of Russia.

On 21 October 2010, he was elected Chairman of the Healthy Cities, Districts and Towns Association during the founding meeting.

In January 2011, Kuvshinnikov received four points out of five possible in the index of influence of the heads of large cities.

On 17 September 2011, Kuvshinnikov was included in the Council for the Development of Local Self-Government in accordance with the Decree of the President.

During Kuvshinnikov's term as mayor between 2008 and 2010, the Yagorbsky bridge was completely reconstructed with the expansion of the roadbed and with the subsequent completion in 2011 of the interchange with access to Naberezhnaya Street, as the project and the start of construction falls under Governor of Vologda Oblast Vyacheslav Pozgalyov. In July 2009, after a 20-year renovation, the Galsky Manor museum complex was opened.

In December 2011, Kuvshinnikov announced his possible resignation as the mayor if United Russia won less than 50% of the vote in Cherepovets.

=== Governor of Vologda Oblast ===
On 14 December 2011, Pozgalyov's resignation, Kuvshinnikov was appointed acting governor of the Vologda Oblast.

On 28 December 2011, on the proposal of President Dmitry Medvedev, Kuvshinnikov was approved as governor by the Legislative Assembly of the Vologda Oblast.

On 7 February 2012, Kuvshinnikov reorganized the secretariat and the governor's protocol service, by reducing the staff by four.

In February 2012, Kuvshinnikov topped the ranking of the most sociable and open to the media governors. At the same time, Kuvshinnikov was recognized by Nezavisimaya Gazeta as one of the least influential heads of regions.

From 3 October 2013 to 9 April 2014 and from 26 May to 22 November 2017, he was a member of the Presidium of the State Council of Russia.

From 2012 to 2013, orders for the provision of services to the Government of the Vologda Oblast for the organization of domestic and international charter flights for a total amount of at least 78 million 489 thousand rubles were placed on the website of the state order of the Vologda Region.

In January 2014, Oleg Kuvshinnikov became the first in the information openness rating among the heads of regions. This is evidenced by the data of a study conducted by the National Monitoring Service. At the same time, the leadership of the Vologda Oblast was included in the anti-rating of the All-Russian People's Front "Index of extravagance". For 2 years, 86 million rubles were spent on charter flights.

In March 2014, Kuvshinnikov initiated a prosecutorial check against journalist Roman Romanenko for his joking post on social networks calling for saving Russians not only in Crimea, but also in the Vologda Oblast. On 4 April 2014, operational-search actions were launched against the Good People charity fund, which is led by Romanenko.

On 5 May 2014, during a working meeting with the President of Russia, he asked for permission to hold early elections for the Vologda Governor. President Putin supported the decision.

On 17 May 2014, in accordance with the Decree of the President of Russia, he accepted his resignation at his own request, and was appointed acting Governor of the Vologda Oblast until the person elected Governor of region takes office.

On 11 June 2014, Kuvshinnikov's initiative, the state award of the Vologda Oblast "For services to the Vologda Oblast" was established.

On 26 June 2014, another of Kuvshinnikov's initiative, the law of the Vologda Oblast No. 3121-03 “On the headmen of the settlements of the Vologda Oblast”, was adopted, which promotes the participation of residents in local self-government.

On 14 September 2014, Kuvshinnikov won the election of the Governor of the Vologda Oblast.

In December 2017, he completed advanced training at Vologda State University under the additional professional program "Project Management in Authorities: Advanced Knowledge (for project managers, administrators, heads of project offices)".

On the Single Voting Day, 8 September 2019, with a score of 60.79% in the first round of elections for the Governor of the Vologda Oblast, he won the reelection, and extended his term of office until 2024.

Kuvshinnikov is a supporter of the abolition of the non-penalized threshold for drivers of 20 km / h and the initiator of reducing the speed limit in settlements to 50 km / h instead of 60 km / h.

In March 2020, at the initiative of the Governor, the Honorary title "Honored Worker of Culture of the Vologda Region" was established to increase the prestige of the profession of a cultural worker.

In September 2021, Kuvshinnikov became the author of the autobiographical book “How to Become/Be a Governor and Stay Alive”, timed to coincide with the 10th anniversary of his tenure as Governor of the Vologda Oblast.

Since December 2021, he has been a member of the Supreme Council of the United Russia party, and the composition was approved on 4 December 2021.

On 31 October 2023 Kuvshinnikov was dismissed from his position of governor by Vladimir Putin and replaced by Geogry Filimonov.

=== Sanctions ===
In July 2022, Kuvshinnikov is under British sanctions for supporting Russia's war against Ukraine.

== Criticism ==
In November 2013, preschool institutions were allowed to take loans from banks to pay salaries.

In 2013, the response of the Department of Construction and Housing and Public Utilities of the Vologda Oblast to the appeal of the mother of a disabled child living in a collapsing house was published in the media, about the impossibility of the administration of the municipality to enforce the court decision on the provision of housing, due to the lack of free apartments in the municipal housing stock.

== Family ==
He is married, and has three sons. The eldest, Aleksandr, works at the Cherepovets Metallurgical Plant, is married and has a daughter. The middle aged, Roman, graduated from the Suvorov Military School in Saint Petersburg, student of the Cherepovets Higher Military Engineering School of Radio Electronics, and is married. The youngest is Danila, who is studying at the Cherepovets Metallurgical College.

== Hobbies ==
He enjoys playing hockey, downhill and cross-country skiing, football, basketball, and swimming. He is a fan of the Severstal hockey club.
