= Vyacheslav Pozgalyov =

Russian politician (1946–2026)

- Вячеслав Позгалёв
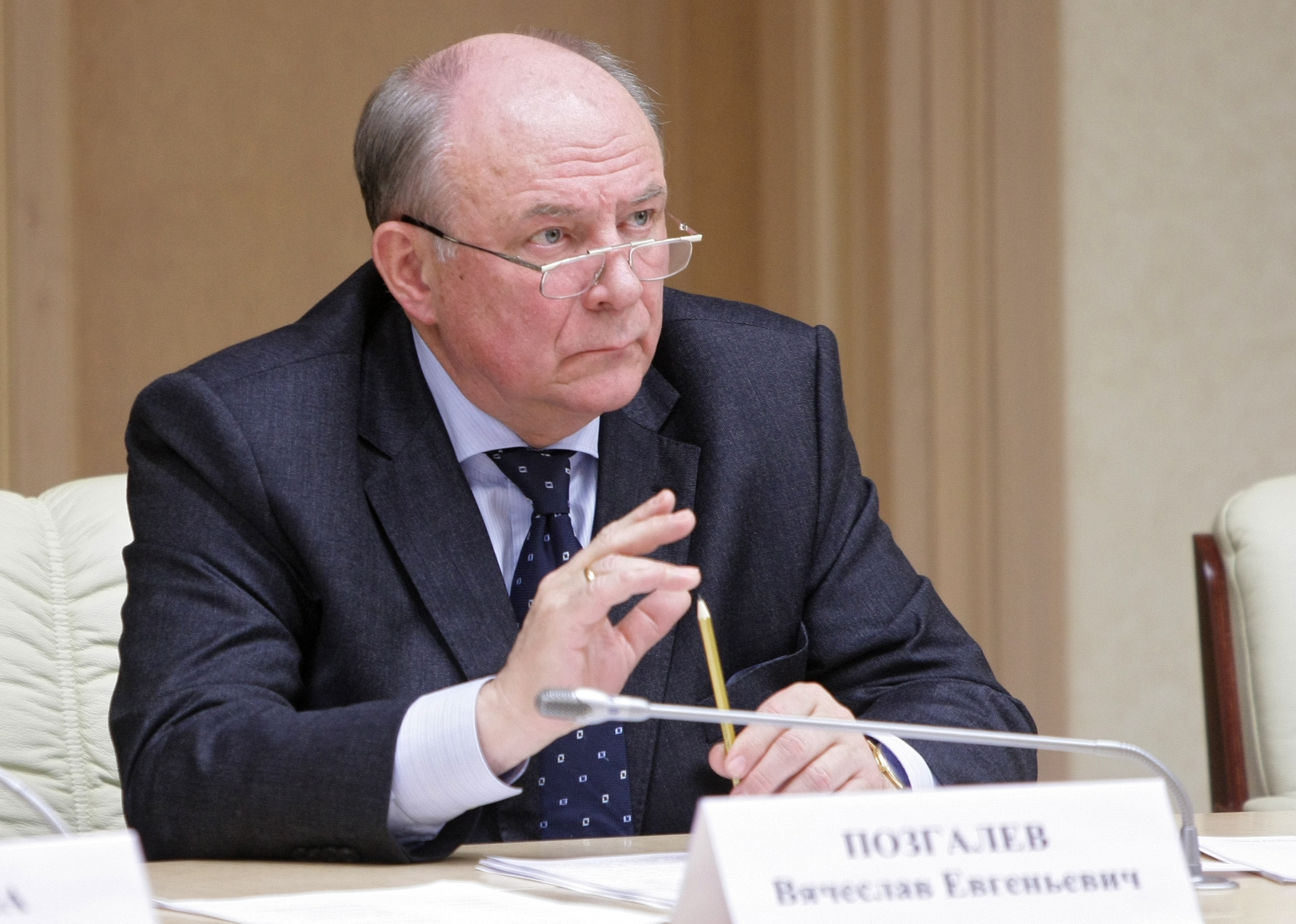
- Pozgolyov in 2010

Member of the State Duma
- In office 14 December 2011 – October 2016

2nd Governor of Vologda Oblast
- In office 23 March 1996 – 14 December 2011
- Preceded by: Nikolay Podgornov
- Succeeded by: Oleg Kuvshinnikov

1st Head of Cherepovets
- In office 4 April 1990 – 23 March 1996
- Succeeded by: Mikhail Stavrovsky

Personal details
- Born: 15 November 1946 Pyongyang, North Korea
- Died: 25 June 2026 (aged 79) Moscow, Russia
- Party: United Russia

Vyacheslav Yevgenyevich Pozgalyov (Russian: Вячеслав Евгеньевич Позгалёв; 15 November 1946 – 25 June 2026) was a Russian politician, who served as governor of Vologda Oblast from 1996 to 2011. He was born in Pyongyang, North Korea to a family of a Smersh officer. He was raised in the Far East and Cherepovets, Vologda Oblast.

Pozgalyov became the governor in 1996. Prior to that, he had been the mayor of Cherepovets. He tendered his resignation on 12 December 2011. He last served as a member of the State Duma until 2016.

Pozgalyov died on 25 June 2026, at the age of 79.

== Honours and awards ==
- Order of Merit for the Fatherland;
  - 2nd class (3 December 1999) – for outstanding contribution to strengthening Russian statehood, and socio-economic development of the region
  - 3rd class (14 November 1996) – for services to the state and many years of diligent work
  - 4th class (20 September 2011) – for outstanding contribution to the socio-economic development of the field and many years of honest work
- Order of Honour (5 August 2003) – for outstanding contribution to the socio-economic development of the field and years of diligent work
- Order of Friendship (15 November 2006) – for outstanding contribution to the socio-economic development of the field and years of diligent work
- Order of the Badge of Honour (1985)
- Honour of the sign "Public recognition" – for the efficient operation of the economy and the successful solution of the social programs of the Vologda region
- Commemorative Medal "For Assistance" (Interior Ministry of Russia, 2011)
