= Legislative Assembly of Vologda Oblast =

Regional parliament of Vologda Oblast, Russia

Legislative Assembly of Vologda Oblast Законодательное собрание Вологодской области
- 10th legislature

Type
- Type: Unicameral

Leadership
- Chairman: Andrey Lutsenko, United Russia since 27 September 2016

Structure
- Seats: 34
- Political groups: United Russia (24) CPRF (5); SRZP (2); LDPR (2) RPPSJ (1)

Elections
- Voting system: Mixed
- Last election: 19 September 2021
- Next election: 2026

Meeting place
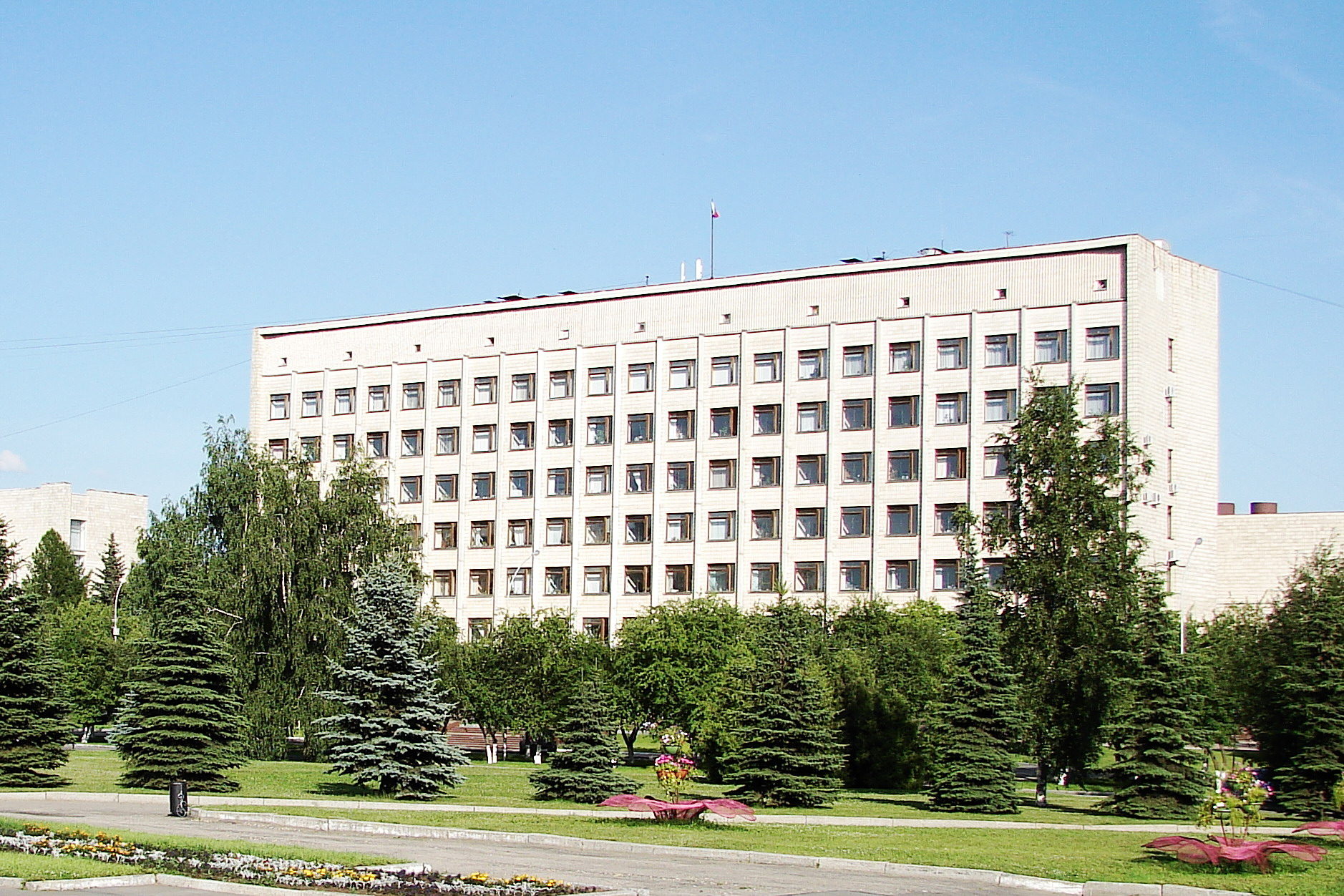
- 25 Pushkinskaya Street, Vologda

Website
- vologdazso.ru

The Legislative Assembly of Vologda Oblast (Russian: Законодательное собрание Вологодской области, romanized: Zakonodatel'noye sobraniye Vologodskoy oblasti) is the regional parliament of Vologda Oblast, a federal subject of Russia. A total of 34 deputies are elected for five-year terms.

== Elections ==
=== 2016 ===
Party	%	Seats
United Russia	37.27	25
Liberal Democratic Party of Russia	21.80	4
Communist Party of the Russian Federation	15.20	3
A Just Russia	12.98	2
Russian Party of Pensioners for Social Justice	4.59	0
Yabloko	3.23	0
Registered voters/turnout	40.56	

=== 2021 ===
Party	%	Seats
United Russia	35.65	24
Communist Party of the Russian Federation	24.42	5
Liberal Democratic Party of Russia	14.55	2
A Just Russia — For Truth	12.34	2
Russian Party of Pensioners for Social Justice	8.19	1
Yabloko	2.34	0
Registered voters/turnout	44.69	

== See also ==
- List of chairmen of the Legislative Assembly of Vologda Oblast
