= Vologda Oblast =

First-level administrative division of Russia

Vologda Oblast Вологодская область (Russian)
- Oblast
- Flag Coat of arms

- Interactive map of Vologda Oblast
- Coordinates: 60°05′N 40°27′E
- Country: Russia
- Federal district: Northwestern
- Economic region: Northern
- Established: September 23, 1937
- Administrative center: Vologda

Government
  - Body: Legislative Assembly
  - Governor: Georgy Filimonov

Area
  - Total: 144,527 km^{2} (55,802 sq mi)
  - Rank: 25th

Population (2021 census)
  - Total: 1,142,827
  - Estimate (2018): 1,176,689
  - Rank: 42nd
  - Density: 7.90736/km^{2} (20.4800/sq mi)
  - Urban: 72.4%
  - Rural: 27.6%

GDP (nominal, 2024)
  - Total: ₽1.08 trillion (US$12.7 billion)
  - Per capita: ₽961,567 (US$11,283.22)
- Time zone: UTC+3 (MSK)
- ISO 3166 code: RU-VLG
- License plates: 35
- OKTMO ID: 19000000
- Official languages: Russian
- Website: http://www.vologda-oblast.ru/

Vologda Oblast (Note: Russian: Вологодская область, romanized: Vologodskaya oblastʹ, IPA: [vəlɐˈɡotskəjə ˈobləsʲtʲ]; Veps: Vologdan agj) is a federal subject of Russia (an oblast). Its administrative center is Vologda. The oblast has a population of 1,202,444 (2010 Census). The largest city is Cherepovets, the home of the Severstal metallurgical plant, the largest industrial enterprise in the oblast.

Vologda Oblast is home to many historic monuments, such as the Kirillo-Belozersky Monastery, Ferapontov Monastery (a World Heritage Site) with the frescoes of Dionisius, the two medieval towns of Velikiy Ustyug and Belozersk, and the baroque churches of Totma and Ustyuzhna.

Large reserves of wood and fresh water are the main natural resources.

== History ==
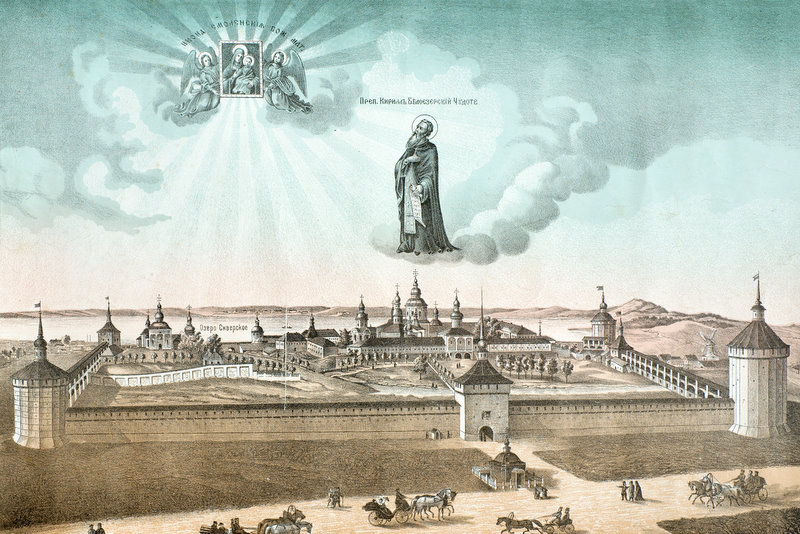
View of Kirillo-Belozersky Monastery. A lithograph from 1897

The area of Vologda Oblast was settled by Finnic peoples in prehistory, and most of the toponyms in the region are, in fact, Finnic. Vepsians, who still live in the west of the oblast, are the descendants of that population. Subsequently, the area was colonized by the Russians. Belozersk was mentioned in chronicles in 862 as one of the oldest towns in Russia. Much of the area was controlled by the Novgorod Republic, in particular, Totma was founded in 1152. Veliky Ustyug and the west of the current territory of the Oblast, with Belozersk and Ustyuzhna, belonged to the Vladimir-Suzdal Principality and were constantly threatened by Novgorod. Not later than in the 13th century, the Novgorod merchants already reached the White Sea. They reached the area by using the waterways. The main waterway to the White Sea was the Northern Dvina, and Novgorod merchants used the Volga and its tributary, the Sheksna, along the Slavyanka River into Lake Nikolskoye, then the boats were taken by land to Lake Blagoveshchenskoye, from there downstream along the Porozovitsa River into Lake Kubenskoye and further to the Sukhona and the Northern Dvina.

In the 13th century, minor principalities started to proliferate. First, the Principality of Beloozero separated from Rostov, its northern and northeastern parts in the 15th century became quasi-independent, forming smaller feudal states like the Principality of Zaozerye or the Principality of Kubena. Many smaller principalities are only mentioned once in chronicles, and the very existence of these principalities is questionable. Between 1452 and 1481, Vologda was the center of the Principality of Vologda, the last independent principality in Vologda lands. By the end of the 15th century, all these lands were a part of the Great Duchy of Moscow.

In the 14th and the 15th centuries, the lands around Vologda became attractive for monks looking for desolate areas but still wishing to keep connections with the princes of Moscow. The princes, in their turn, viewed the monasteries as means to keep the influence of the Grand Duchy of Moscow in its remote areas. A number of influential monasteries, including Spaso-Prilutsky, Pavlo-Obnorsky, Kirillo-Belozersky, and Ferapontov monasteries, were founded. Kirillo-Belozersky Monastery soon became one of the most prominent Russian monasteries, with a lot of political influence, and successful economic development.

In the middle of the 15th century, the Vologda Lands were strongly involved with the Muscovite Civil War: Thus, Vasily the Blind was exiled to Vologda in 1446 and was released from his allegiance oath by the hegumen of the Kirillo-Belozersky Monastery, and by the late 1440s the Sukhona valley became the battlefield between the retreating army of Dmitry Shemyaka and the army of Vasily, chasing Shemyaka. During the Time of Troubles, the area was ravaged by Polish troops, who at some point besieged Vologda but did not succeed in conquering the city.

In the 17th century, Vologda was a prosperous city located on the main trading route from Moscow to Western Europe. During the reign of Tsar Peter the Great in the 18th century, Vologda became a shipbuilding center and played an important role in support of Russian military operations against Sweden. However, the importance of Vologda as a trade center was diminished after Saint Petersburg was founded in 1703, and the foreign trade was rerouted to the Baltic Sea. Peter even imposed restrictions on the White Sea trade.

Vologda was the northernmost territory where serfdom existed in Russia. In the lands west and south of Vologda, estates existed, but to the north and east of Vologda serfdom was never implemented, and the population owned their land.

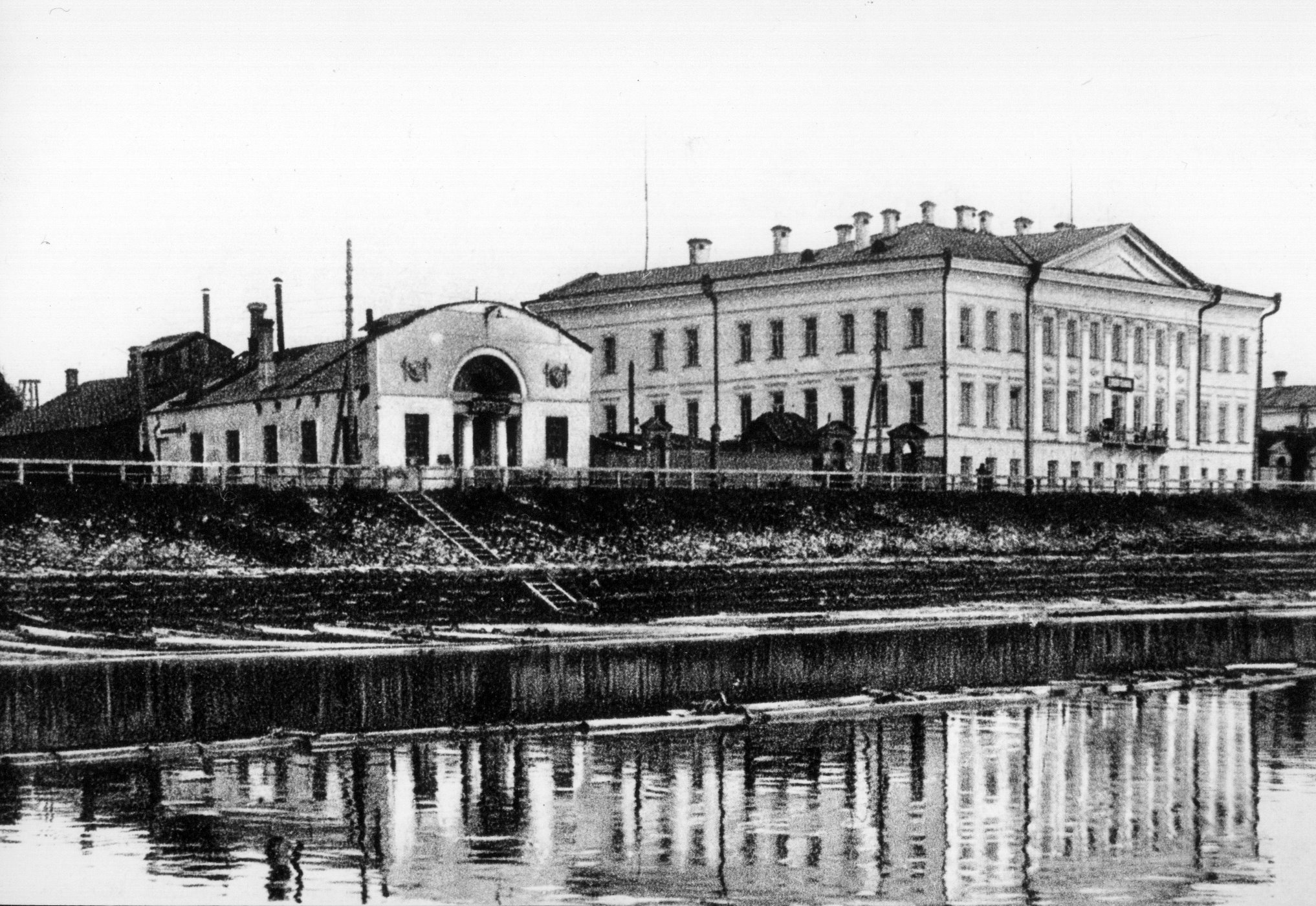
Vologda in the 1910s

In 1708, Peter the Great issued an edict which established seven governorates. The description of the borders of the governorates was not given; instead, their area was defined as a set of towns and the lands adjacent to those towns. Two of the governorates, Archangelgorod Governorate (east of the oblast) and Ingermanland Governorate (west of the oblast), were located in the present-day area of Vologda oblast. Vologda became a part of Archangelgorod Governorate. Subsequently, the western part of the Oblast was transferred to Novgorod Governorate. In 1780, Vologda became the administrative center of Vologda Viceroyalty which included the territory of the former Archangelgorod Governorate. Eventually, the viceroyalty was transformed into Vologda Governorate. After a sequence of further administrative reforms, Vologda Oblast was established in 1937.

During the Second World War, the Soviet Union operated a prisoner-of-war camp in Kornilyevo, first for Poles and Finns captured during the Soviet invasions of Poland and Finland, and later for German POWs. Parts of Oshtinsky District in the west of the oblast became the only areas of Vologda Oblast to be occupied by foreign (Finnish) troops. The Finnish advance was stopped in October 1941, but the occupation continued till June 1944, when the Soviet Army started to advance.

In 1955, the construction of Severstal in the city of Cherepovets, the biggest industrial enterprise in the oblast, was completed.

On 4 July 1997, Vologda, alongside Bryansk, Chelyabinsk, Magadan, and Saratov signed a power-sharing agreement with the government of Russia, granting it autonomy. The agreement would be abolished on 15 March 2002.

== Politics ==
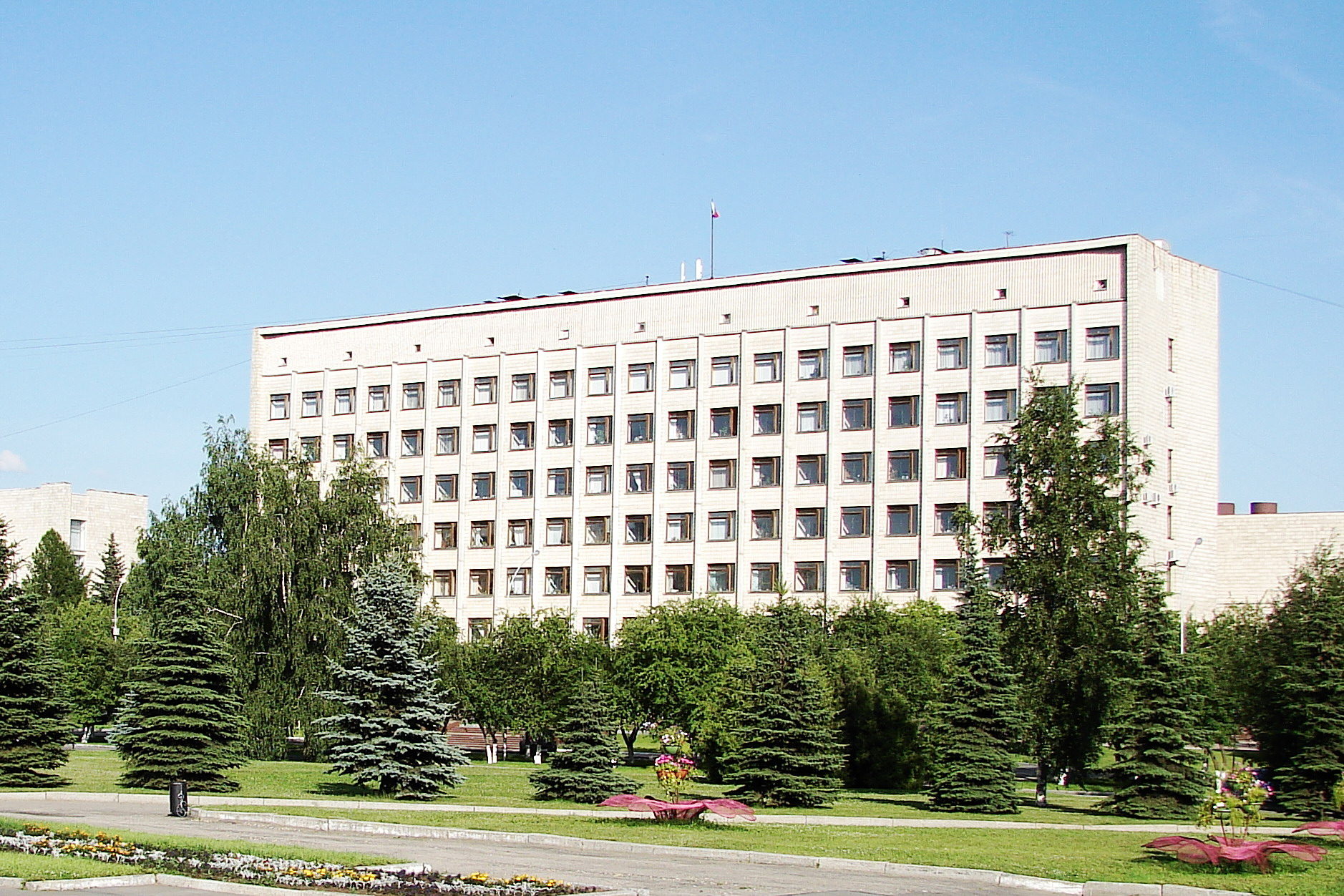
The building of the Legislative Assembly in Vologda

During the Soviet period, the high authority in the oblast was shared between three persons: The first secretary of the Vologda CPSU Committee (who in reality had the biggest authority), the chairman of the oblast Soviet (legislative power), and the Chairman of the oblast Executive Committee (executive power). Since 1991, CPSU lost all the power, and the head of the Oblast administration, and eventually the governor was appointed/elected alongside elected regional parliament.

The politics in the oblast is governed by the Charter of Vologda Oblast. The laws within the authority of the oblast are passed by the Legislative Assembly of Vologda Oblast. The highest executive body is the Vologda Oblast Administration. It also includes the executive bodies of the subdivisions such as districts, and is responsible for the daily administration. The Oblast administration supports the activities of the governor who is the head of the oblast and acts as guarantor of the observance of the Charter in accordance with the Constitution of Russia.

As a subject of the Russian Federation, the Vologda Oblast has a certain constituent power, which consists of the right to adopt its charter, laws, and other regulatory legal acts. The charter of the Vologda Oblast establishes the foundations of the legal status, ensuring human and civil rights, as well as the institutions of democracy, the economic and financial foundations of the region, the foundations of socio-cultural policy, the organization of state power, administrative-territorial division and the organization of local self-government.

=== First secretaries of the Vologda Oblast CPSU Committee ===
In the period when they were the most important authority in the oblast (1937 to 1991), the following first secretaries were appointed

- 1937: Grigory Andreyevich Ryabov, executed during the Great Purge
- 1937–1942: Pavel Timofeyevich Komarov
- 1942–1945: Boris Fyodorovich Nikolayev
- 1945–1952: Vasily Nikitich Derbinov
- 1952–1955: Alexey Vladimirovich Syomin
- 1955–1960: Ivan Sergeyevich Latunov
- 1960–1961: Vadim Sergeyevich Milov
- 1961–1985: Anatoly Semyonovich Drygin
- 1985–1990: Valentin Alexandrovich Kuptsov
- 1990–1991: Vladimir Ivanovich Saranskikh

=== Governors ===
Since 1991, governors were sometimes appointed, and sometimes elected:

- 1991–1996: Nikolay Mikhaylovich Podgornov, head of the administration, appointed
- 1996–2011: Vyacheslav Yevgenyevich Pozgalyov, head of the administration, appointed; then governor, elected
- 2011–2023: Oleg Alexandrovich Kuvshinnikov, governor, appointed; then elected in 2014
- 2023–present: Georgy Yuryevich Filimonov, governor, appointed then elected in 2024

=== Legislative Assembly ===
Legislative power is exercised by the Legislative Assembly of Vologda Oblast - a unicameral parliament of 34 deputies elected by a mixed electoral system (17 + 17) by the region's inhabitants for a five-year term. The current convocation was elected in September 2021. The deputies represent five parties: United Russia (24), Communist Party (5), Liberal Democratic Party (2), A Just Russia (2), and Party of Pensioners (1). The current chairman is Andrei Lutsenko. The next elections are expected in September 2026.

=== Governor and government ===
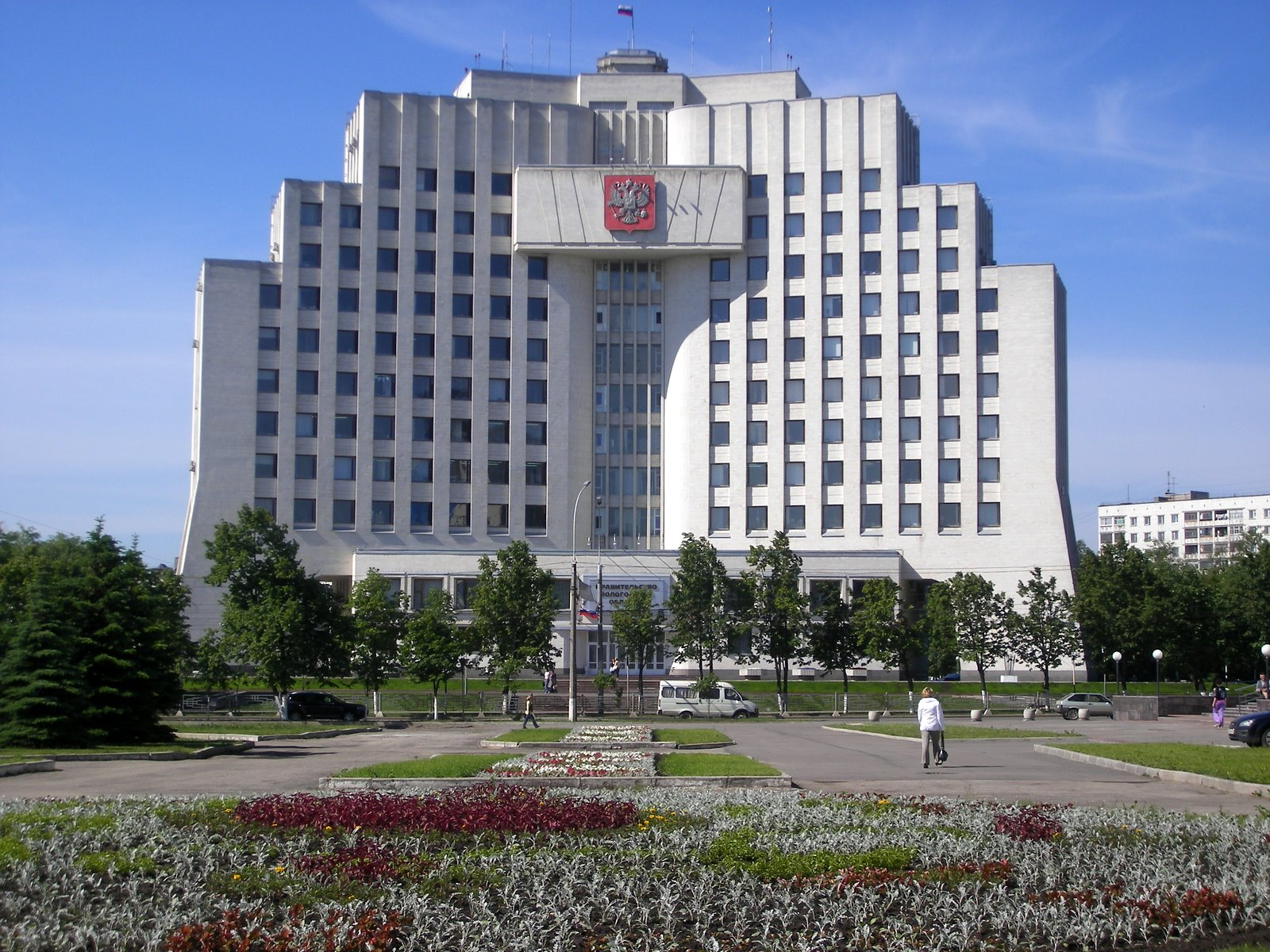
The building of the government of the Vologda Oblast and the administration of the governor

Executive power is exercised by the governor, the government of the Vologda Oblast headed by him, and other executive authorities. The governor is elected by the region's inhabitants for a term of five years and cannot hold the said position for more than two consecutive terms. The current governor is Georgy Filimonov of United Russia. In December 2011, he was appointed acting governor and then empowered by deputies of the Legislative Assembly. In 2012, in most subjects of the Russian Federation, direct elections of governors were returned with a municipal filter, a two-term limit, and the possibility of dismissal by decree of the President of the Russian Federation. In the early elections in September 2014, Kuvshinnikov won 62.98% of the vote and was elected for five years. In the elections in September 2019, Kuvshinnikov was re-elected for five years.

Legislative power is exercised by the Legislative Assembly of Vologda Oblast, a unicameral parliament consisting of thirty-four deputies.

== Geography ==
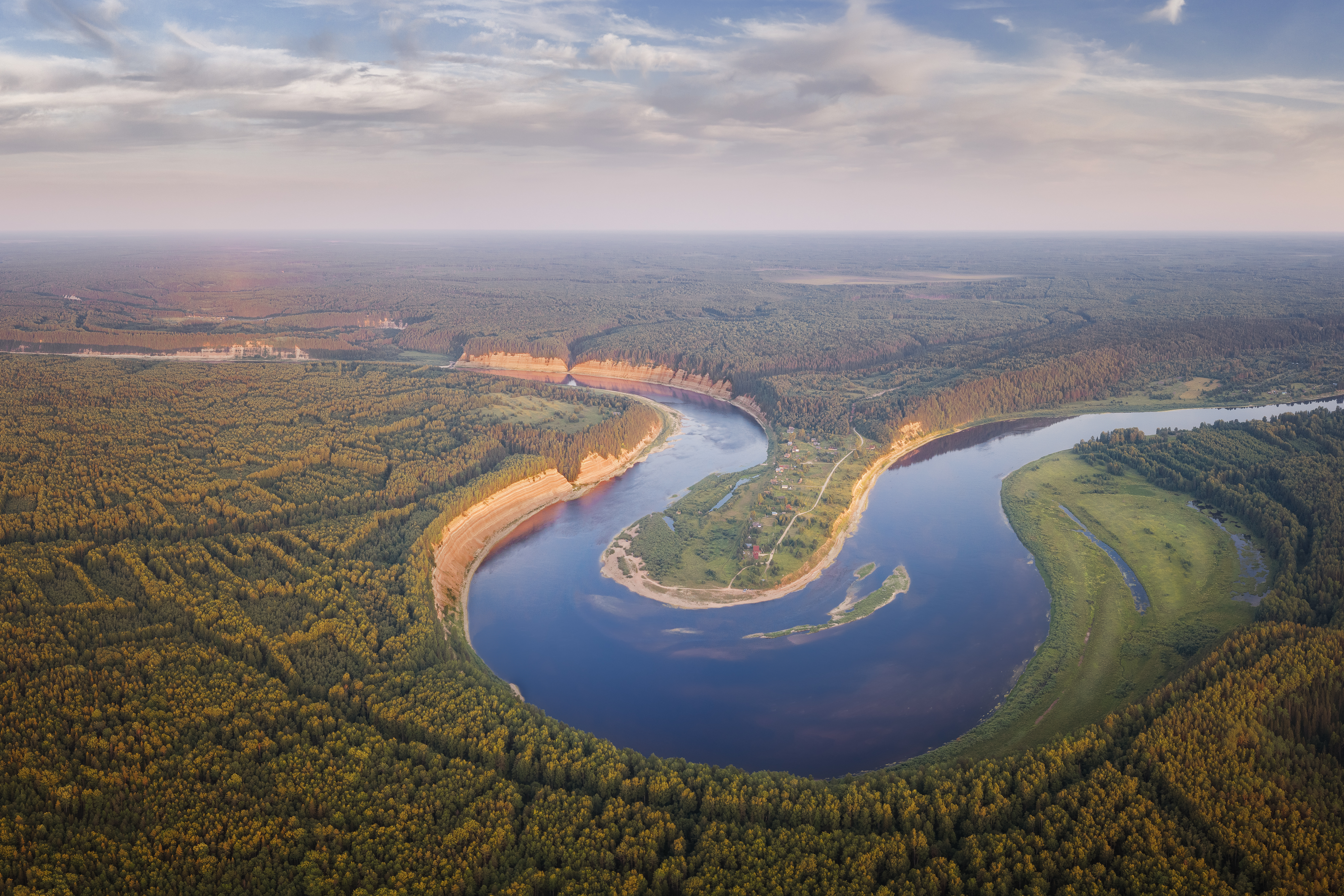
River Sukhona

Vologda Oblast borders with Arkhangelsk Oblast in the north, Kirov Oblast in the east, Kostroma Oblast in the southeast, Yaroslavl Oblast in the south, Tver and Novgorod Oblasts in the southwest, Leningrad Oblast in the west, and the Republic of Karelia in the northwest.

Vologda Oblast is located on the East European Plain, and most of it represents forested hilly landscape. The southwest of the oblast, along the Sheksna and the Mologa, is flat. The northwestern part is mostly of glacial origin, with the Andoma Hills, the Veps Hills, and a number of minor hill chains. The highest point of the oblast is 304 metres (997 ft) high Malgora hill. In the east of the oblast, the valleys of the Vaga, the Sukhona, and the Yug are cut through the hills. The southeast of the oblast is occupied by the Northern Ridge, which is located south of the valley of the Sukhona.

Much of the area of the oblast is occupied by coniferous forest (taiga) and by swamps.

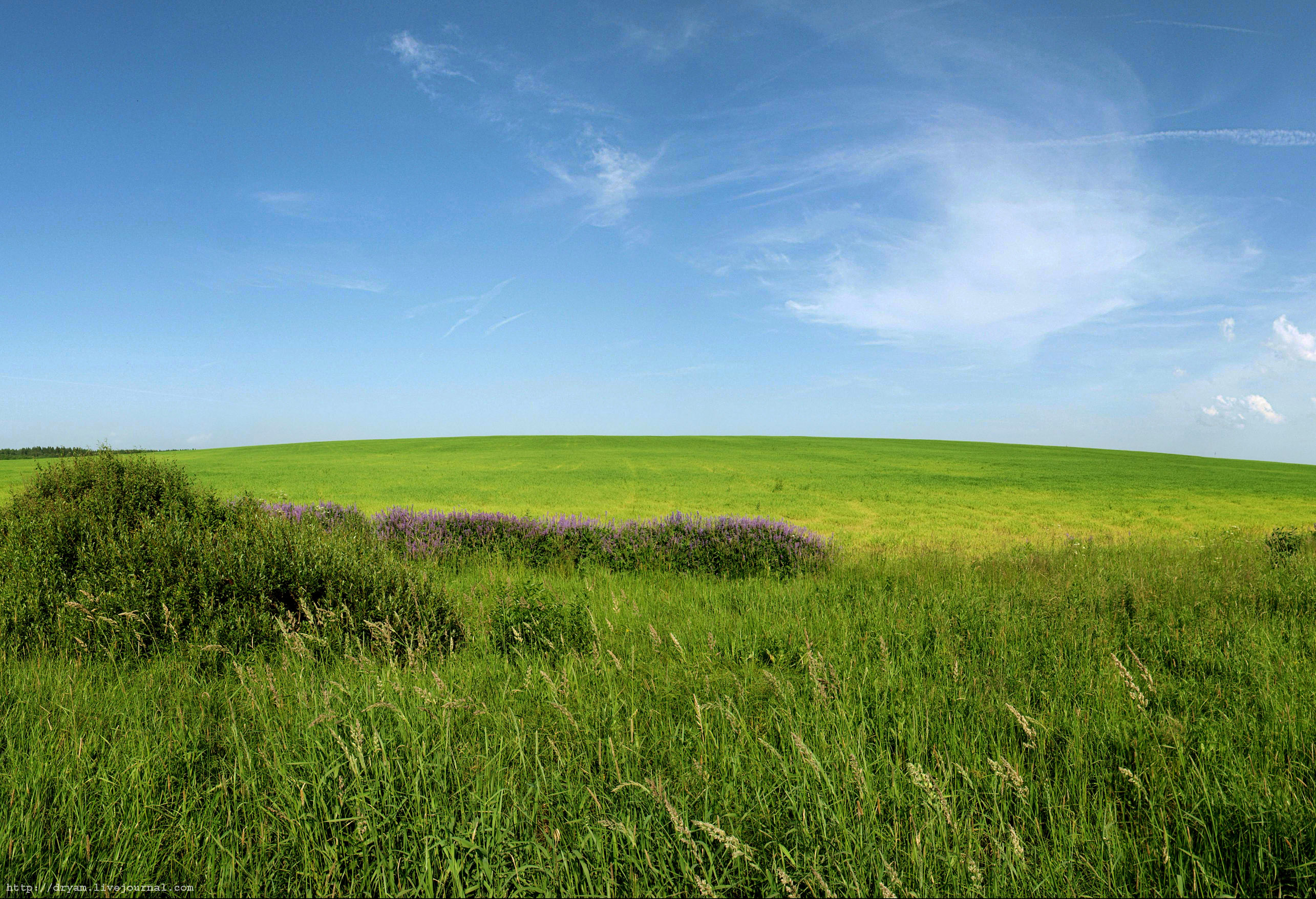
Hills in Vologda Oblast. Northwest of the city of Vologda, close to the selo of Molochnoye.

The area of Vologda Oblast is split between the basins of the White Sea, the Baltic Sea, and the Caspian Sea. In the northeast of the oblast, in the Vologodsky District, there is a point which is a triple divide of the river basins of the Neva (Baltic Sea), the Volga (Caspian Sea), and the Onega (White Sea), and thus the basins of the Atlantic Ocean, the Arctic Ocean, and the endorheic basins of the interior of Eurasia. This is one of the very few such triple divides in the world and the only one in Russia. The southwestern shore of Lake Onega, one of the biggest freshwater lakes in Europe, belongs to Vologda Oblast, and the tributaries of Lake Onega, the biggest of which are the Vytegra River and the Andoma River, belong to the river basin of the Neva and thus drain to the Baltic Sea. Also, minor areas in the west of the oblast drain into the Oyat River which is a right tributary of the Svir and belongs to the basin of the Neva. The western part of the oblast drains into the Rybinsk Reservoir of the Volga. The biggest tributaries of the reservoir are the Mologa, the Suda, the Sogozha, and the Sheksna. Lake Beloye, one of the biggest lakes in the oblast, is the source of the Sheksna. Some areas in the south of the oblast drain into tributaries of the Volga, including the Unzha. Lake Vozhe in the northwest of the Oblast, with its main tributary, the Vozhega, drains in the Onega River in the White Sea basin. The rest of the oblast, including Lake Kubenskoye, another major lake in the oblast, belongs to the river basin of the Northern Dvina. The Northern Dvina is formed in the northeast of the oblast from merging of the Sukhona and the Yug. The Sukhona forms the major waterway of Vologda Oblast. Another major tributary of the Northern Dvina, which has its source in Vologda Oblast, is the Vaga.

Two areas in Vologda Oblast have been designated as protected natural areas of federal significance. These are Russky Sever National Park in the center of the oblast and Darwin Nature Reserve in the southwest of the oblast (shared with Yaroslavl Oblast).

== Demographics ==
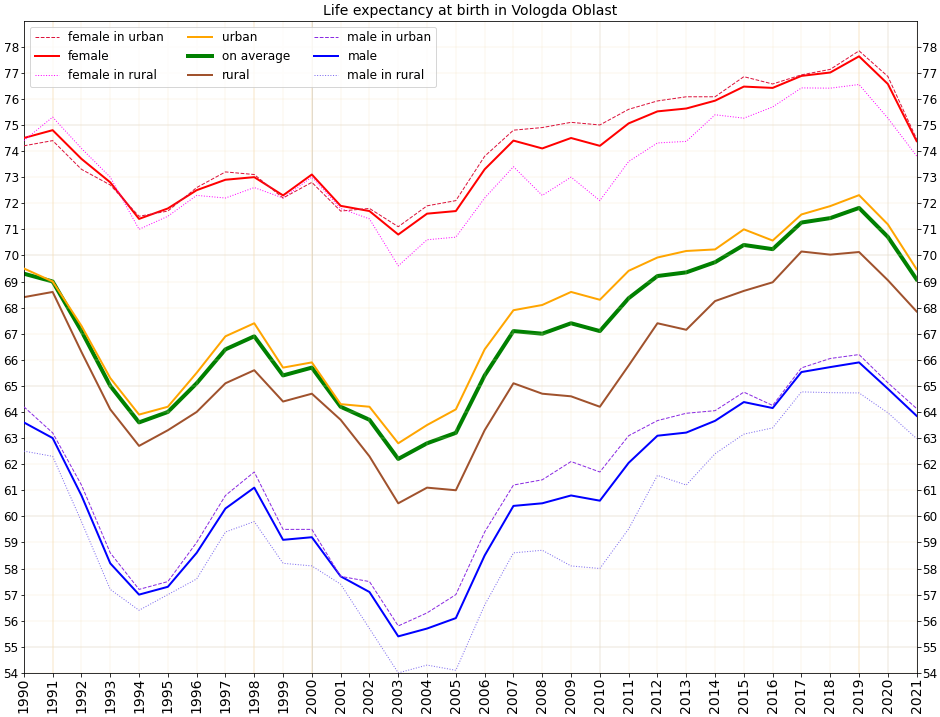
Life expectancy at birth in Vologda Oblast

Historical population
Year	Pop.	±%
1897	1,341,785	—
1926	1,053,832	−21.5%
1939	1,599,000	+51.7%
1959	1,307,531	−18.2%
1970	1,295,897	−0.9%
1979	1,309,799	+1.1%
1989	1,353,870	+3.4%
2002	1,269,568	−6.2%
2010	1,202,444	−5.3%
2021	1,142,827	−5.0%
Source: Census data

Population: 1,142,827 (2021 census); 1,202,444 (2010 census); 1,269,568 (2002 census); 1,353,870 (1989 Soviet census).

Vital statistics for 2024:

- Births: 8,230 (7.4 per 1,000)
- Deaths: 16,163 (14.5 per 1,000)

Total fertility rate (2024):

1.33 children per woman

Life expectancy (2021)

Total: 69.08 years (male: 63.85, female: 74.38)

Ethnic composition for 2010:

- Russians: 97.3%
- Ukrainians: 0.7%
- Belarusians: 0.3%
- Veps: 0.04%
- Others: 1.7%
- 58,511 people were registered from administrative databases, and could not declare an ethnicity. It is estimated that the proportion of ethnicities in this group is the same as that of the declared group.

Babayevsky and Vytegorsky District in the northwest of the oblast belong to the areas traditionally populated by Vepsians. The Vepsians living in Vologda Oblast speak the central group of Veps dialects. More than 55% of the population of the oblast lives in its two largest cities (Vologda and Cherepovets).

Religion in Vologda Oblast as of 2012 (Sreda Arena Atlas)
Russian Orthodoxy	29.5%
Other Orthodox	0.9%
Old Believers	0.5%
Other Christians	2%
Rodnovery and other native faiths	1%
Spiritual but not religious	39.4%
Atheism and irreligion	19.9%
Other and undeclared	5.8%

Religion

According to a 2012 survey 29.5% of the population of Vologda Oblast adheres to the Russian Orthodox Church, 2% are unaffiliated generic Christians, 1% are Eastern Orthodox Christian believers not belonging to any church or belonging to non-Russian Eastern Orthodox churches, 1% are adherents of the Slavic native faith (Rodnovery), and 1% are Old Believers. In addition, 39% of the population declared to be "spiritual but not religious", 20% is atheist, and 6.5% follows other religions or did not give an answer to the question.

=== Settlements ===
Largest cities or towns in Volgoda Oblast
Rank		Pop.
1	Cherepovets	317,970
2	Vologda	312,420
3	Sokol, Vologda Oblast	36,924
4	Veliky Ustyug	31,475
5	Sheksna, Sheksninsky District, Vologda Oblast	18,892
6	Gryazovets	14,800
7	Babayevo (town), Vologda Oblast	11,395
8	Kaduy, Vologda Oblast	11,194
9	Vytegra	10,324
10	Totma	9,805

== Administrative divisions ==
The oblast is administratively divided into four cities and towns under the oblast's jurisdiction (Vologda, Cherepovets, Sokol, and Veliky Ustyug) and twenty-six districts. Another ten towns (Babayevo, Belozersk, Gryazovets, Kadnikov, Kharovsk, Kirillov, Nikolsk, Totma, Ustyuzhna, and Vytegra) have the status of the towns of district significance. The town of Krasavino is under administrative jurisdiction of Veliky Ustyug Town of Oblast Significance.

== Economy ==
=== Industry ===
The biggest industrial enterprise of Vologda Oblast is the Severstal steel plant located in the city of Cherepovets. The metallurgical industry is responsible for approximately 50% of the total industrial production of the oblast. it is followed by chemical (also based in Cherepovets), food, and timber industries, and the machine building industry.

Metallurgy was a traditional industry developed in the region since the 16th century, when its center was located in Ustyuzhna. Another traditional industries were salt production (around Totma) and glass making (in what is currently Chagodoshchensky District). In the 18th century, timber production started to grow rapidly. In the 19th century, the textile industry enterprises making flax textiles started to proliferate. In 1871, the Danish merchant Friedrich Buman opened a specialized butter factory in the manor of Fominskoye (13 km northwest of Vologda). It was the first butter factory both in Vologda Governorate and in Russia. Since then Vologda became the center of the butter industry, and the Vologda butter, a special type of butter with the taste of nuts invented by Nikolay Vereschagin and Buman, became a world trademark.

=== Agriculture ===
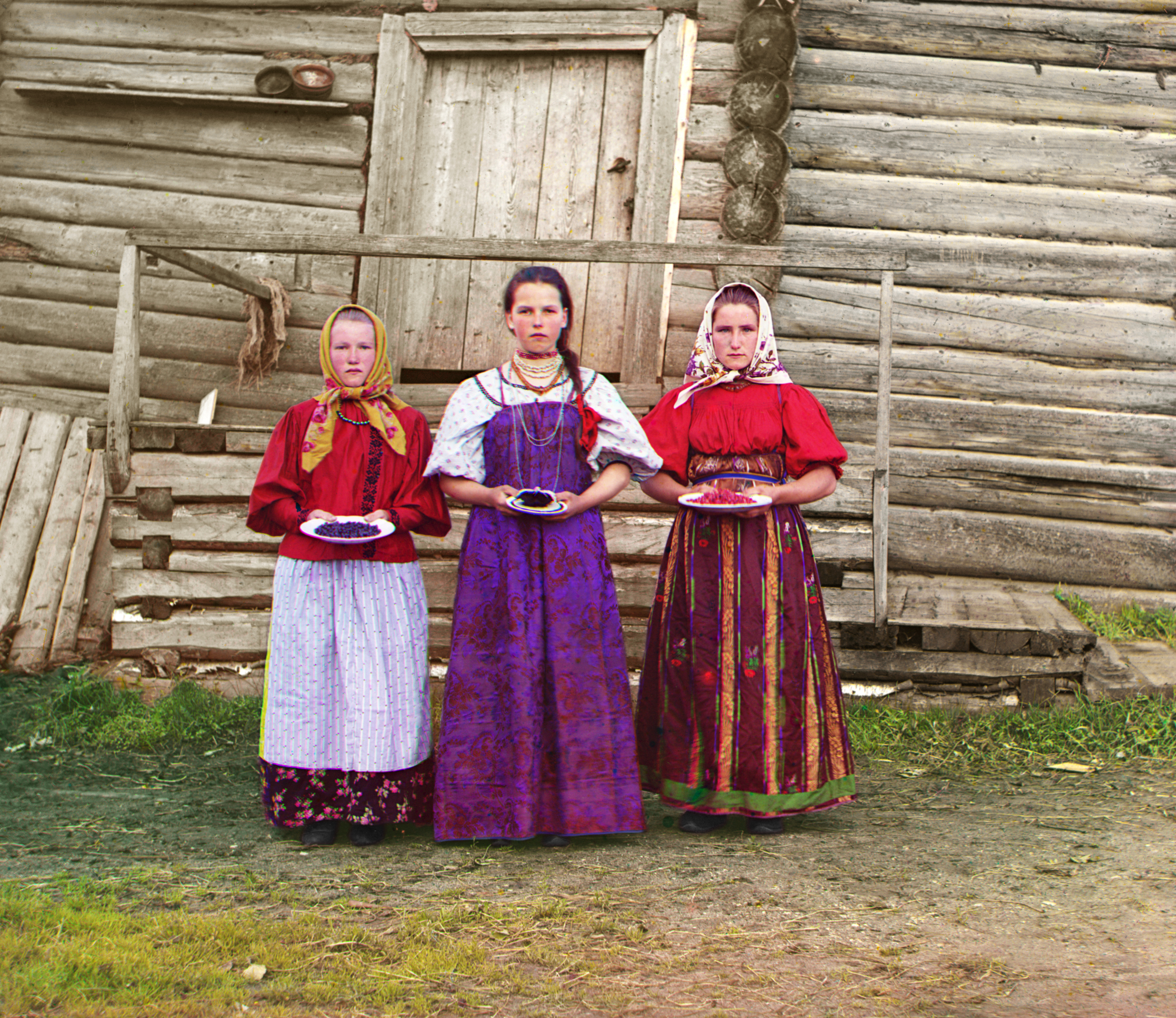
Young Russian peasant women in front of traditional wooden house, in a rural area along the Sheksna River near Kirillov. Early color photograph from Russia, created by Sergey Prokudin-Gorsky.

The agriculture in the oblast is essentially cattle breeding with milk and meat production, production of eggs, growing of crops, flax, potatoes, and vegetables. In 2008, 73% of all agricultural products were produced by large-scale farms.

=== Transportation ===
The area of current Vologda Oblast has always been located on the trading routes connecting central Russia to the White Sea, and, in fact, in the 17th century the White Sea was the main sea export route for Russia. The whole course of the Sukhona is navigable, as well as the lower courses of some of its tributaries, including the Vologda. However, there is currently very little or no regular passenger navigation on the Sukhona. Volga–Baltic Waterway, first constructed in the 19th century as the Mariinsk Canal System and then reconstructed in the 20th century, connects the river basins of the Volga and the Neva via the Sheksna, Lake Beloye, the Kovzha, and the Vytegra, and is one of the main waterways in European Russia. The Northern Dvina Canal connects the Sheksna and Lake Kubenskoye, thus being a connection between the river basins of the Volga and the Northern Dvina.

One of the principal highways in Russia, M8, connects Moscow and Arkhangelsk, and passes Vologda. This highway is paved and heavily used. Other important paved roads include A114 highway, connecting Vologda to Cherepovets and Saint Petersburg, the roads connecting Vologda to Kirillov (the part which continues to Lipin Bor, Vytegra, and Pudozh, is partially paved), Vologda to Veliky Ustyug via Totma, Totma to Nikolsk via Imeni Babushkina, and Kotlas to Manturovo and eventually to Kostroma and Moscow via Veliky Ustyug and Nikolsk. There are connections from Ustyuzhna to Pestovo and Vesyegonsk. However, the road network is underdeveloped, especially close to the borders of the oblast. There is only one road crossing from Vologda Oblast to Kostroma Oblast. Several roads cross into Kirov Oblast, but they are all unpaved and badly maintained. So is the connection between Lipin Bor and Kargopol. In the west of the oblast, there are very few through roads even across the district boundaries. Nevertheless, the vast majority of settlements have road connections of some quality, the roads are used for timber transportation, and there is regular bus service on the main roads.

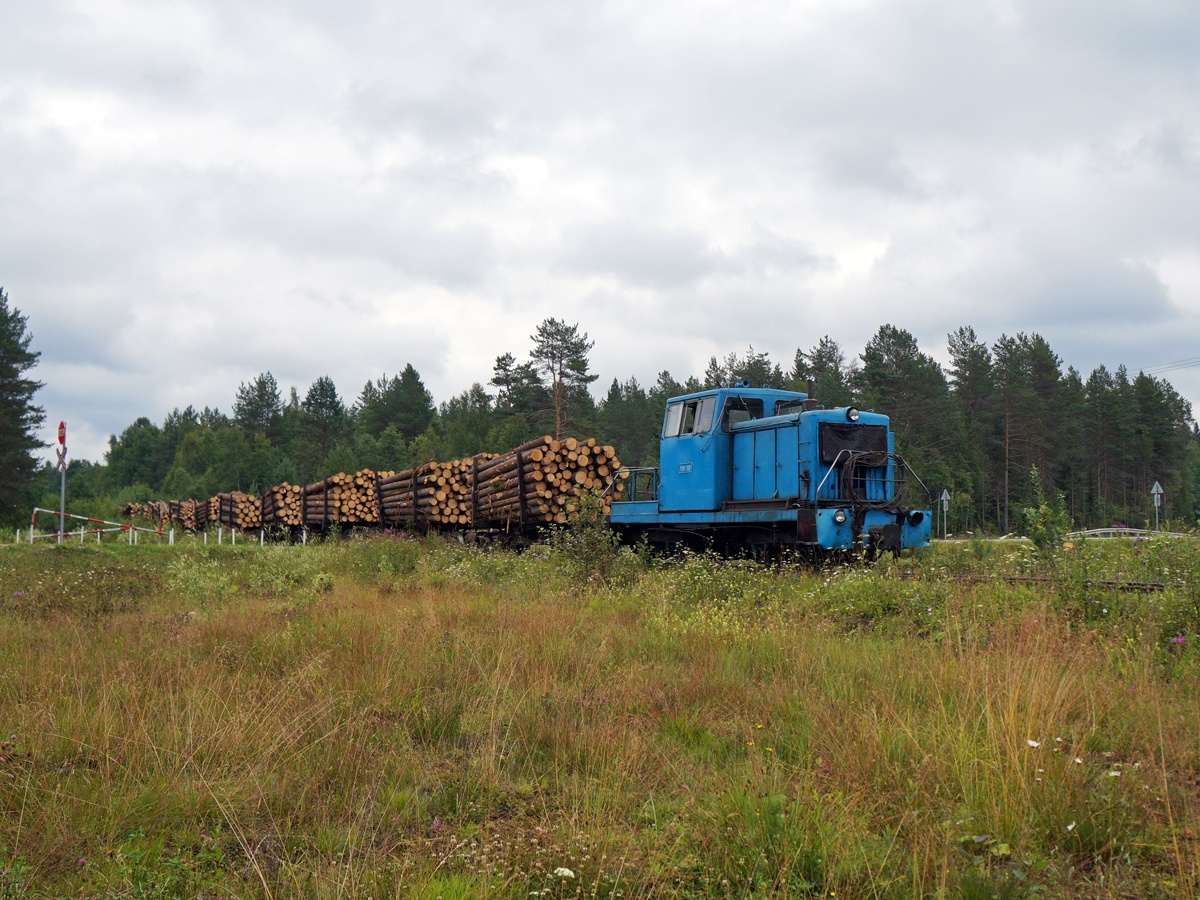
Belorucheyskaya forest railway in 2015

The principal railway line in the oblast is the railroad connecting Moscow and Arkhangelsk. The piece between Vologda and Arkhangelsk was constructed in the 1890s. A branch from Konosha eastwards to Kotlas and further to Vorkuta, which crosses the north of the oblast, was constructed in the 1940s to facilitate the transport of coal from the Komi Republic. The railway connecting Vologda with Saint Petersburg via Cherepovets was built in the 1900s. There is also a railway connecting Vologda via Vokhtoga to Buy. At Vokhtoga, the Monza Railroad branches off east. It was built for timber transport and is operated by the timber production authorities. The Monza railroad runs along the border of Vologda and Kostroma Oblasts. The plans to extend it further east to Nikolsk were never realized. The Monza Railroad has a separate station in Vokhoga, Vokhtoga-2 railway station. The headquarters of the Monzales company which owns the railroad are located in Vokhtoga. A large number of narrow-gauge railways were built in the 1950s and 1960s to facilitate the transport of timber, but since then most of these have become unprofitable and have been destroyed.

Currently, the local aviation has almost disappeared. There is an airport in Vologda. Locally, there is infrequent service to Veliky Ustyug, Kichmengsky Gorodok, and Vytegra.

The oil transport system, Baltic Pipeline System, runs through the oblast, with three oil-pumping stations located at Nyuksenitsa, Pogorelovo, and Gryazovets.

== Arts and culture ==
=== Literature ===
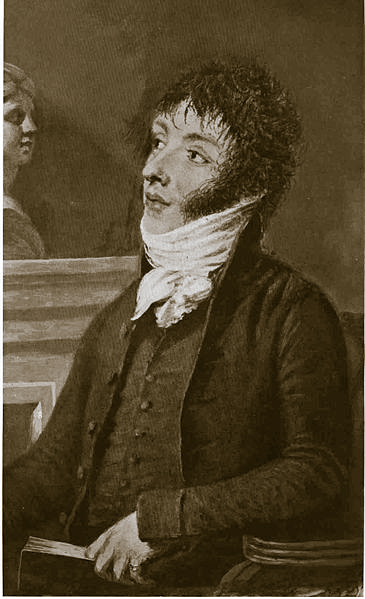
Batyushkov's portrait by Orest Kiprensky (1815)

In the 19th and the 20th centuries, many notable authors had their estates in Vologda Region; however, their literary activity mostly was related to Saint Petersburg rather than to the estates. Thus, Konstantin Batyushkov, a poet, was born and raised in his estate in Danilovskoye, but became a notable author after he moved to the state service to Saint Petersburg, and he only returned to Vologda (where he eventually died) after he developed a mental illness. Igor Severyanin, a 20th-century poet, spent considerable periods of his life in the estate of his uncle, Vladimirovka, close to the city of Cherepovets.

In the 20th century, two of the authors of the Village prose movement in Soviet literature, which predominantly described rural life, were tightly connected with Vologda Region. Vasily Belov was born in the village of Timonikha, currently in Kharovsky District, and lives in Vologda. Alexander Yashin was born in Nikolsky District and completed his studies in Nikolsk, but then moved to Moscow. A poet Nikolay Rubtsov spent much of his life in Vologda Oblast before being killed in a domestic dispute in 1971. Yury Koval, mainly known for his children's books, spent considerable periods of his life in Vologda Oblast.

=== Architecture ===
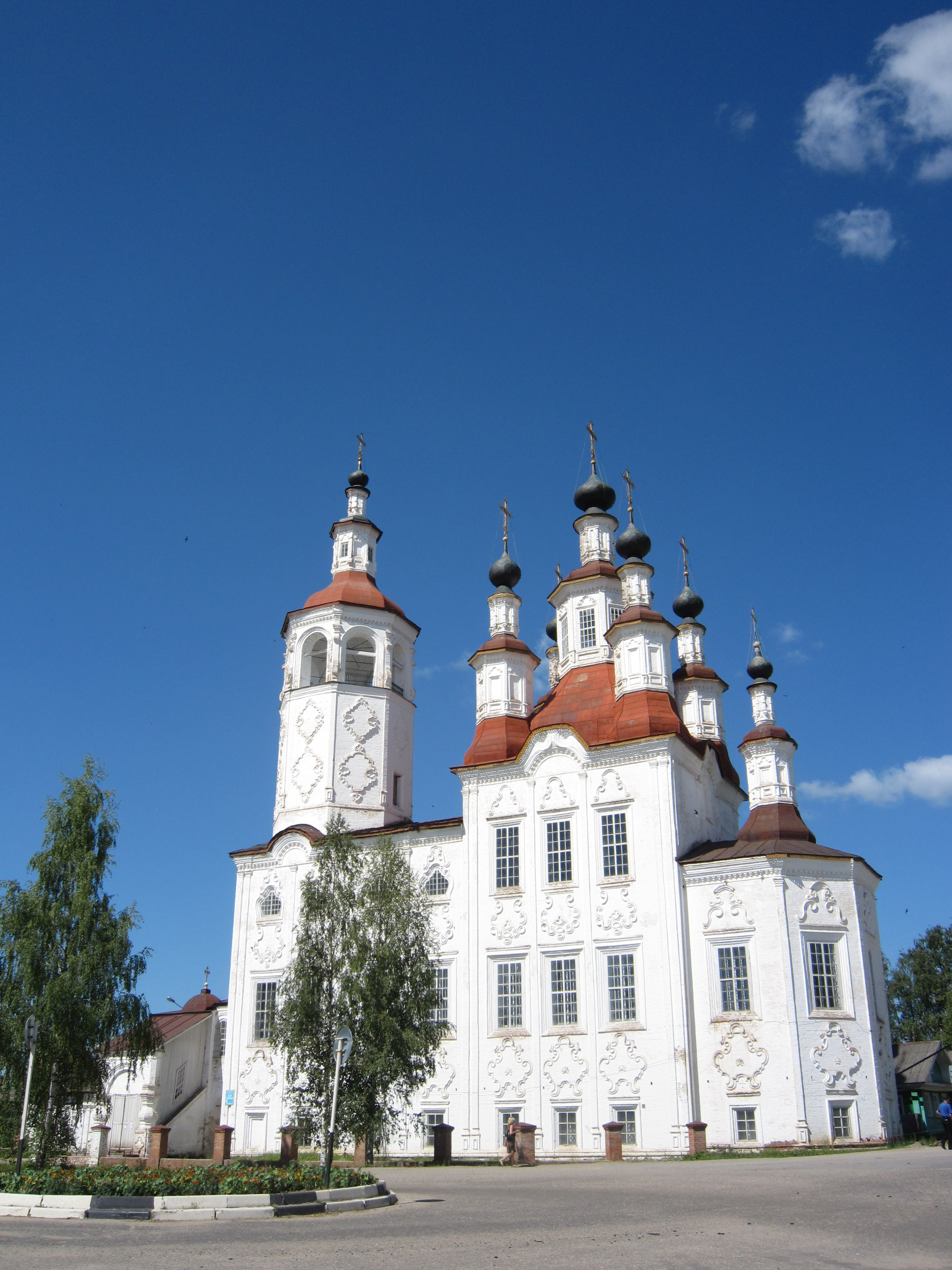
Church of the Entry into Jerusalem, Totma

Three of the towns in the oblast—Belozersk, Totma, and Veliky Ustyug—are classified as historical towns by the Ministry of Culture of Russian Federation, which implies certain restrictions on construction in their historical centers.

The old center of Vologda until the 1990s contained many wooden houses, including five wooden classicist manors, protected by the government as cultural heritage monuments. Despite the protection, many of these burnt down, or were simply demolished. Still, many buildings, including four classicist manors, survive, and make Vologda one of the biggest collection of wooden town houses of the 19th century in Russia.

Some of the best examples of rural wooden architecture are collected in open-air Ethnographic Museum in Semyonkovo, northwest of Vologda.

Several cities and towns in Vologda Oblast preserved their architectural heritage. In contrast to many other Russian towns in the 1920s and 1930s, Veliky Ustyug was left intact and declared the national cultural heritage very early after 1917. It preserved therefore almost all of its historic center. Vologda, Belozersk, Totma, Gryazovets, and Ustyuzhna keep many of their historical buildings. In particular, several churches in Totma were built in the 18th century in the unique style which is sometimes referred to as Totma Baroque.

The relative desolation of Vologda lands attracted monks looking for solitude, resulting in numerous monasteries. The Kirillo-Belozersky Monastery, the Spaso-Prilutsky Monastery, the Goritsky Monastery, and the Troitse-Gledensky Monastery represent examples of Russian medieval fortification architecture and also contain buildings rated among the best preserved cultural heritage. The Ferapontov Monastery, included into the World Heritage list, contains the only survived fully painted church in Russia with the frescoes of Dionisius. As of 2010, four of the monasteries in Vologda Oblast were acting: the Kirillo-Belozersky, the Spaso-Prilutsky, the Goritsky, and the Pavlo-Obnorsky monasteries.

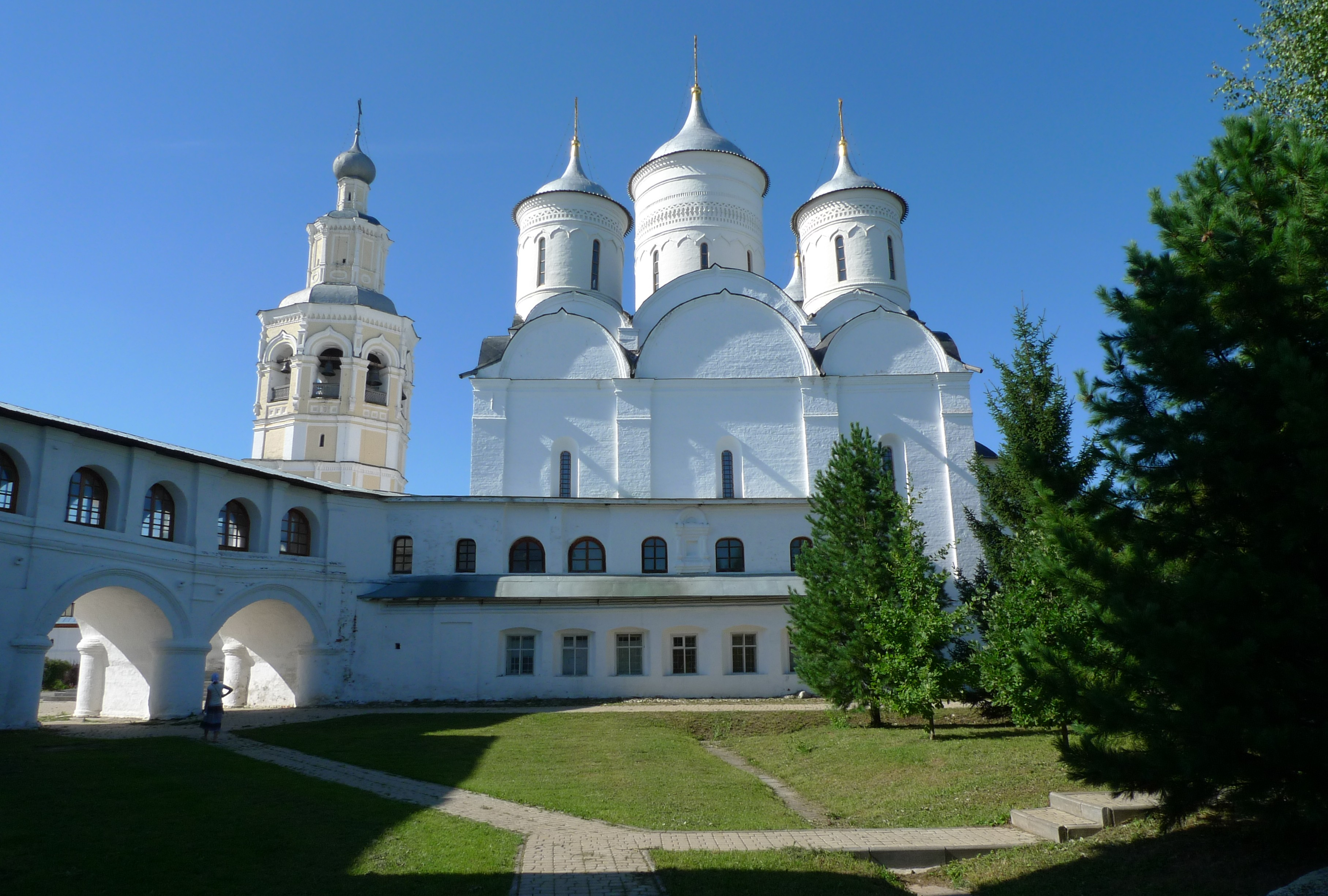
Spaso-Prilutsky Monastery

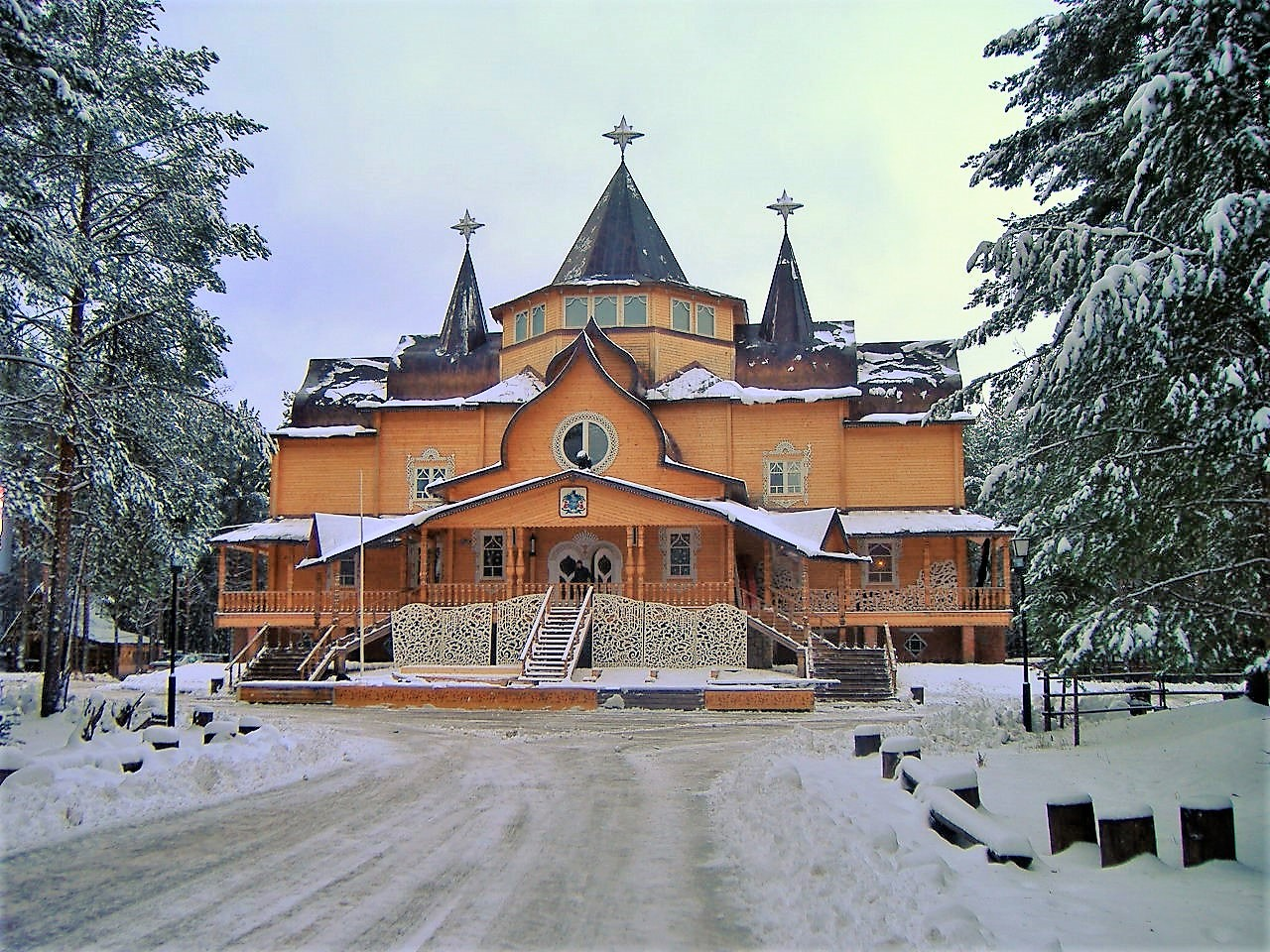
The residence of Ded Moroz in Veliky Ustyug

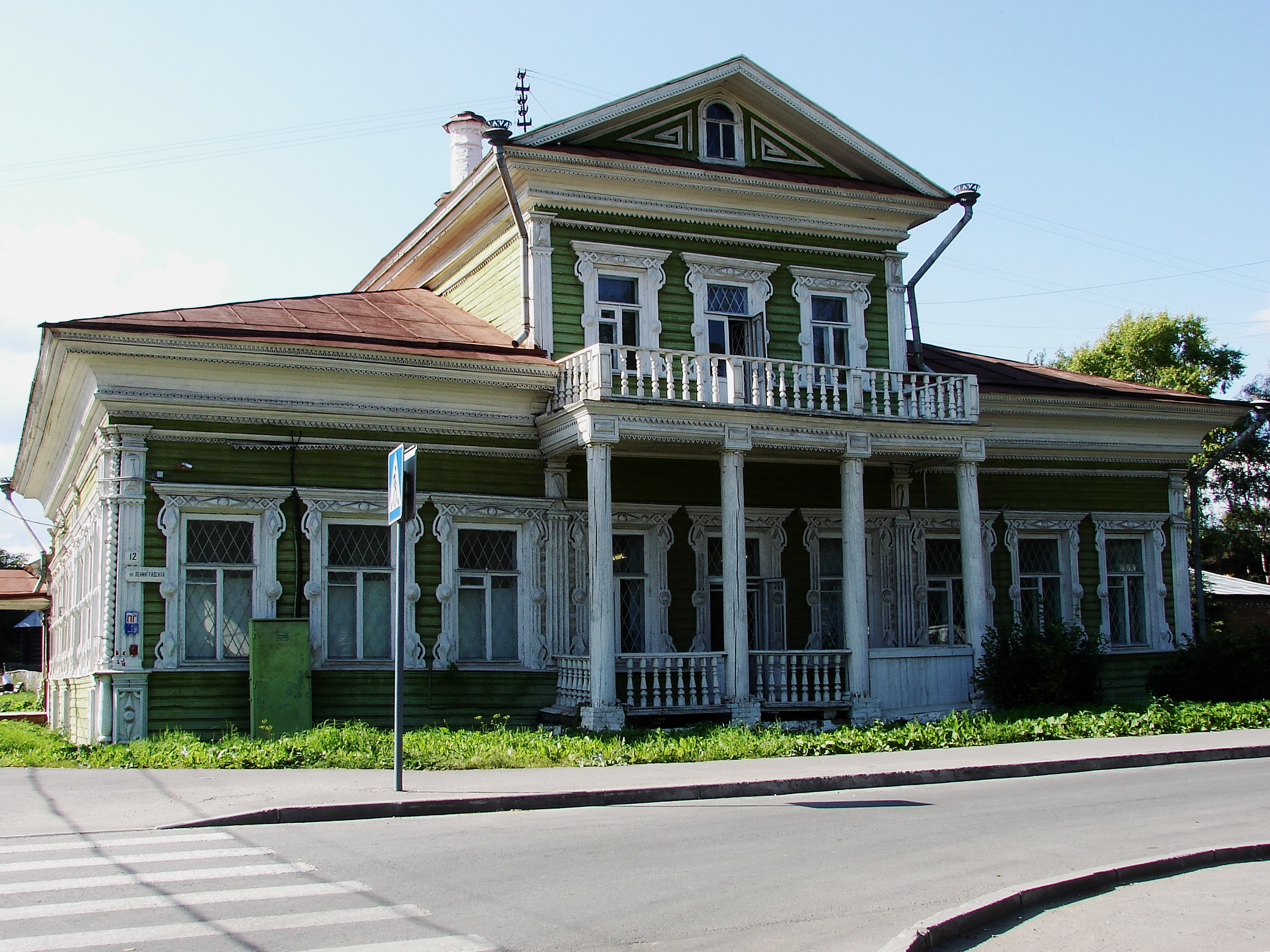
Zasetsky House in Vologda (the 1790s)

=== Handicrafts ===
Various handicrafts were developed in the area. A number of those are protected by law.

== Bibliography ==
- Brumfield, William. Vologda Album (Moscow: Tri Kvadrata, 2005). ISBN 5-94607-050-9.
