= Mieleszczuk =

Mieleszczuk or Mileszczuk is a Polish-language surname, most probably of Ukrainian origin. The correspoinding Ukrainian-language surname is Meleshchuk (Мелещук). Notable people with the surname include:

- Olga Avigail Mieleszczuk, Poland-born Israeli singer
- Kazimierz Mieleszczuk (1939–2021), Polish handball player
- Yeva Meleshchuk (born 2001), Ukrainian gymnast

== See also ==
- Melekhov
- Meleshko
- Melenchuk
