= Meletiev =

Meletiev, feninine: Meletieva (Russian: Мелетиев) is a Russian patronymic surname derived from the given name Meletiy (Meletius). Boris Unbegaun indicates that most probably it is an artificial Russian surname originated in clergy, being derived from the official Church Slavonic baptismal given name Meletiy, rather than the colloquial form Melentiy. Notable people with the surname include:

- Pavel Meletiev (1880–1962), Catholic bishop, titular bishop of Heracleopolis
- Serafima Meletieva (born 1886), abbess of the Catholic Church of the Byzantine Rite

== See also ==
- Melentyev
