= Yemelyanovo =

Yemelyanovo (Russian: Емельяново) is the name of several inhabited localities in Russia.

== Modern localities ==
=== Urban localities ===
- Yemelyanovo, Krasnoyarsk Krai, a work settlement in Yemelyanovsky District of Krasnoyarsk Krai

=== Rural localities ===
- Yemelyanovo, Pestyakovsky District, Ivanovo Oblast, a village in Pestyakovsky District of Ivanovo Oblast
- Yemelyanovo, Yuzhsky District, Ivanovo Oblast, a village in Yuzhsky District of Ivanovo Oblast
- Yemelyanovo, Zavolzhsky District, Ivanovo Oblast, a village in Zavolzhsky District of Ivanovo Oblast
- Yemelyanovo, Luzsky District, Kirov Oblast, a village in Papulovsky Rural Okrug of Luzsky District in Kirov Oblast
- Yemelyanovo, Pizhansky District, Kirov Oblast, a village in Izhevsky Rural Okrug of Pizhansky District in Kirov Oblast
- Yemelyanovo, Buysky District, Kostroma Oblast, a village in Tsentralnoye Settlement of Buysky District in Kostroma Oblast
- Yemelyanovo, Galichsky District, Kostroma Oblast, a village in Berezovskoye Settlement of Galichsky District in Kostroma Oblast
- Yemelyanovo, Moscow Oblast, a village in Gorskoye Rural Settlement of Orekhovo-Zuyevsky District in Moscow Oblast
- Yemelyanovo, Pechorsky District, Pskov Oblast, a village in Pechorsky District of Pskov Oblast
- Yemelyanovo, Pskovsky District, Pskov Oblast, a village in Pskovsky District of Pskov Oblast
- Yemelyanovo, Kazulinskoye Rural Settlement, Safonovsky District, Smolensk Oblast, a village in Kazulinskoye Rural Settlement of Safonovsky District in Smolensk Oblast
- Yemelyanovo, Prudkovskoye Rural Settlement, Safonovsky District, Smolensk Oblast, a village in Prudkovskoye Rural Settlement of Safonovsky District in Smolensk Oblast
- Yemelyanovo, Republic of Tatarstan, a selo in Laishevsky District of the Republic of Tatarstan
- Yemelyanovo, Belsky District, Tver Oblast, a village in Budinskoye Rural Settlement of Belsky District in Tver Oblast
- Yemelyanovo, Staritsky District, Tver Oblast, a selo in Yemelyanovskoye Rural Settlement of Staritsky District in Tver Oblast
- Yemelyanovo, Vesyegonsky District, Tver Oblast, a village in Lyubegoshchinskoye Rural Settlement of Vesyegonsky District in Tver Oblast
- Yemelyanovo, Vologda Oblast, a village in Spassky Selsoviet of Vologodsky District in Vologda Oblast

== Abolished localities ==
- Yemelyanovo, Nizhny Novgorod Oblast, a village in Semenovsky Selsoviet of Urensky District in Nizhny Novgorod Oblast; abolished in September 2013

== Alternative names ==
- Yemelyanovo, alternative name of Yemelyanova, a village in Velyaminovsky Rural Administrative Okrug of Karachevsky District in Bryansk Oblast; 52°59′N 35°5′E

== See also ==
- Yemelyanovsky, several rural localities in Russia
