= Melekhov =

Melekhov (Russian: Мелехов), feminine: Melekhova is a Russian-language surname. The Ukrainian-language equivalent is Melekhiv, Belarusan: Melekhau/Melekhaw. It is a patronymic surname derived from the diminutive form Мелёха/Мелеха (Melyokha/Melekha) of the given name Yemelyan or Meletiy/Meletius.

Notable people with the surname include:

- Aleksandr Melekhov (born 2002), Russian footballer
- Ivan Melekhov (1905–1994) Soviet forestry scientist
- Vyacheslav Melekhov (1945–2012), Soviet and Russian film and stage actor
- Yanina Melekhova, Belarusian and Russian film and stage actress
- Melekhov family, from the novel And Quiet Flows the Don novel by Mikhail Sholokhov
  - Grigory Melekhov, major protagonist of the novel
  - Prokopy, grandfather of Grigory
  - Pantelei, father of Grigory
  - Vasilissa, mother of Grigory
  - Pyotr, older brother of Grigory
  - Yevdokiya, younger sister of Grigory
  - Darya, wife of Pyotr
  - Natalya, wife of Grigory
