= Yemelyanovsky =

Yemelyanovsky (Russian: Емелья́новский; masculine), Yemelyanovskaya (Емелья́новская; feminine), or Yemelyanovskoye (Емелья́новское; neuter) is the name of several rural localities in Russia.

== Modern localities ==
- Yemelyanovsky, Nizhny Novgorod Oblast, a settlement in Vasilevo-Maydansky Selsoviet of Pochinkovsky District in Nizhny Novgorod Oblast
- Yemelyanovsky, Novosibirsk Oblast, a settlement in Moshkovsky District of Novosibirsk Oblast
- Yemelyanovskoye, a village in Kabozhskoye Settlement of Khvoyninsky District in Novgorod Oblast
- Yemelyanovskaya, Cherevkovsky Selsoviet, Krasnoborsky District, Arkhangelsk Oblast, a village in Cherevkovsky Selsoviet of Krasnoborsky District in Arkhangelsk Oblast
- Yemelyanovskaya, Lyakhovsky Selsoviet, Krasnoborsky District, Arkhangelsk Oblast, a village in Lyakhovsky Selsoviet of Krasnoborsky District in Arkhangelsk Oblast
- Yemelyanovskaya, Telegovsky Selsoviet, Krasnoborsky District, Arkhangelsk Oblast, a village in Telegovsky Selsoviet of Krasnoborsky District in Arkhangelsk Oblast
- Yemelyanovskaya, Lensky District, Arkhangelsk Oblast, a village in Slobodchikovsky Selsoviet of Lensky District in Arkhangelsk Oblast
- Yemelyanovskaya, Plesetsky District, Arkhangelsk Oblast, a village in Kenozersky Selsoviet of Plesetsky District in Arkhangelsk Oblast
- Yemelyanovskaya, Primorsky District, Arkhangelsk Oblast, a village in Koskogorsky Selsoviet of Primorsky District in Arkhangelsk Oblast
- Yemelyanovskaya, Kirov Oblast, a village under the administrative jurisdiction of the Town of Luza in Luzsky District of Kirov Oblast; 60°41′N 47°3′E
- Yemelyanovskaya, Belozersky District, Vologda Oblast, a village in Artyushinsky Selsoviet of Belozersky District in Vologda Oblast
- Yemelyanovskaya, Tarnogsky District, Vologda Oblast, a village in Nizhnespassky Selsoviet of Tarnogsky District in Vologda Oblast
- Yemelyanovskaya, Vozhegodsky District, Vologda Oblast, a village in Vozhegodsky Selsoviet of Vozhegodsky District in Vologda Oblast

== Alternative names ==
- Yemelyanovskaya/Yemelyanovskoye, alternative names of Yemelyanovka, a village in Voznesenskaya Rural Territory of Yaysky District in Kemerovo Oblast; 56°23′N 85°55′E
