= Max Gunzburger =

American mathematician

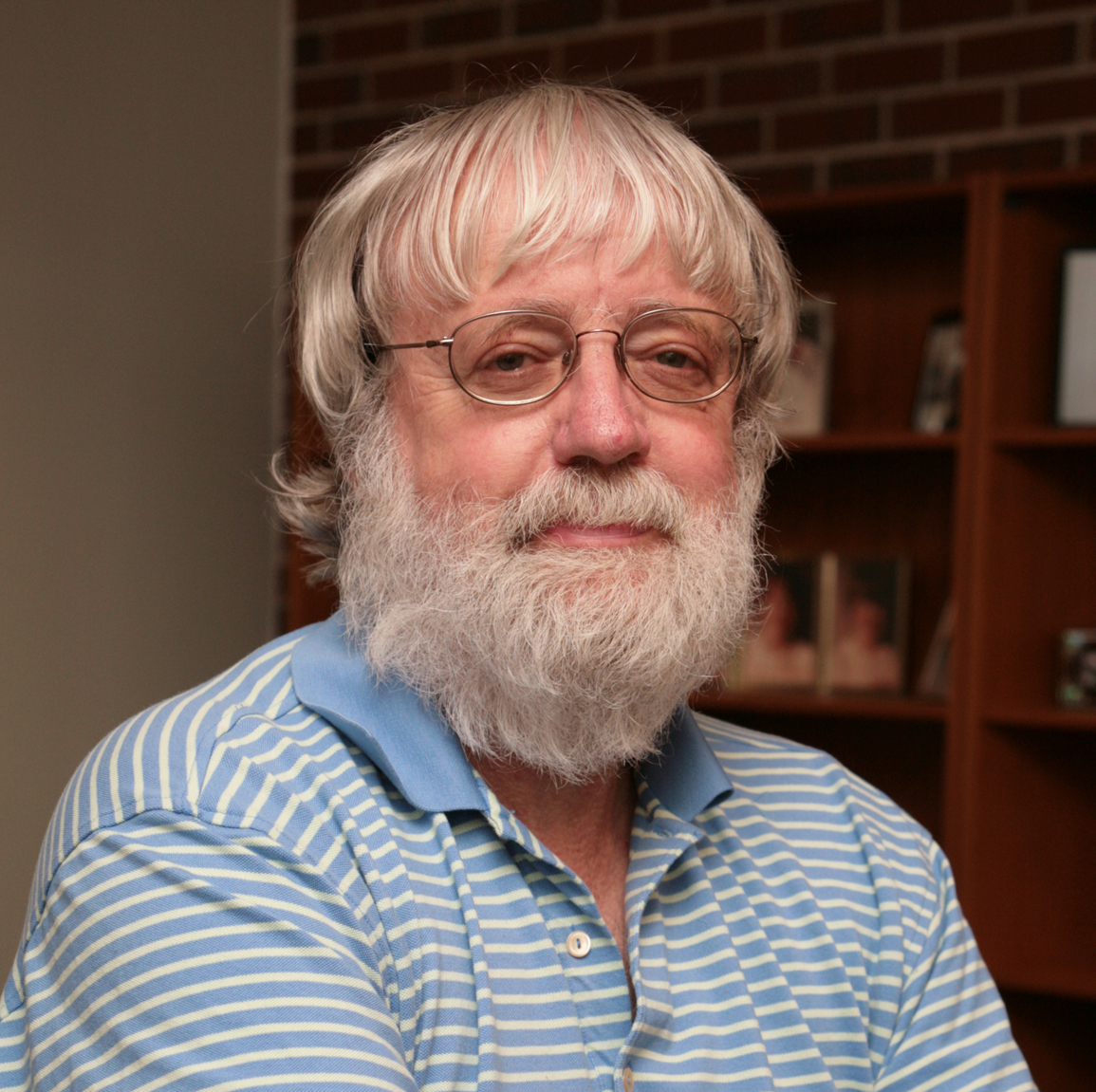
- Born: Buenos Aires, Argentina
- Education: New York University
- Known for: Finite Element Method; Centroidal Voronoi Tesselations; Optimal Control
- Awards: W.T. and Idalia Reid Prize in Mathematics
- Scientific career
- Fields: Mathematician and Computational Scientist
- Workplaces: Florida State University; Iowa State University
- Doctoral advisor: Lu Ting

Max D. Gunzburger, Francis Eppes Distinguished Professor of Mathematics at Florida State University, is an American mathematician and computational scientist affiliated with the Florida State interdisciplinary Department of Scientific Computing. He was the 2008 winner of the SIAM W.T. and Idalia Reid Prize in Mathematics. His seminal research contributions include flow control, finite element analysis, superconductivity and Voronoi tessellations. He has also made contributions in the areas of aerodynamics, materials, acoustics, climate change, groundwater, image processing and risk assessment.

== Ph.D. ==
After completing his BS degree at New York University in 1966, Gunzburger earned his Ph.D. degree from the same University in 1969. His thesis, titled Diffraction of shock waves by a thin wing—Symmetric and anti-symmetric problems, was written under the direction of Lu Ting.

== Early career ==
Gunzburger began his career at New York University as a research scientist and assistant professor of mathematics, a position he held from receiving his Ph.D. until 1971. He then spent two years working as a post-doctorate at the Naval Ordnance Laboratory before transferring to the Institute for Computer Applications in Science and Engineering at NASA until 1976. He then became an associate professor and professor of mathematics at the University of Tennessee, a position he held from 1976 to 1982.

Transferring again, he moved from Carnegie Mellon University in 1981 to 1989, to Virginia Polytechnic Institute and State University from 1987 to 1997. In 1989 he completed his influential first book, "Finite Element Methods for Viscous Incompressible Flows: A Guide to Theory, Practice and Algorithms," ISBN 978-0-12-307350-1, which according to Google scholar has over 400 citations as of March 2009.

== Distinguished professorship ==
In 1995, Gunzburger took a position with Iowa State University as professor and chair of mathematics. In 2001, he was awarded distinguished professor of mathematics. At Iowa State he wrote three other books.

Gunzburger came to the Florida State University in 2002. As an Eppes professor, Gunzburger is among the university's most distinguished scholars. He currently serves as the chair of the Department of Scientific Computing.

== SIAM ==
Gunzburger served as editor-in-chief of the SIAM Journal on Numerical Analysis from 2000 to 2007. He also served as the chairman of the board of trustees in 2003 and has held various other SIAM positions

== Awards and honors ==
In 2007, issues 3–4 in volume 4 of the "International Journal of Numerical Analysis and Modeling" were dedicated to Gunzburger to honor the occasion of his 60th birthday. In 2008, Gunzburger was awarded the W.T. and Idalia Reid Prize in Mathematics, an award given for "research in, or other contributions to, the broadly defined areas of differential equations and control theory." The award was given based on "fundamental contributions to control of distributed parameter systems and computational mathematics." Gunzbuger was elected a fellow of SIAM on May 1, 2009 for "contributions to control of fluids and scientific computing."

== Publications ==
As of March 2009, Gunzburger has published 153 peer-reviewed articles in scholarly journals (162 according to MathSciNet). Three of the most highly cited are

- Qiang Du, Max Gunzburger, and Janet S. Peterson, "Analysis and approximation of the Ginzburg-Landau model of superconductivity", SIAM Review 34 (1992), no 1, 54–81. MR 1156289
- Qiang Du, Vance Faber, and Max Gunzburger, "Centroidal Voronoi tessellations: Applications and algorithms", SIAM Review 41 (1999), no. 4, pp. 637–676. MR 1722997
- Pavel B. Bochev and Max Gunzburger, "Finite element methods of least-squares type", SIAM Review 40 (1998), no. 4, 789–837. MR 1659689

== Students and Post-Doctorates ==
As of March 2009, 29 students had completed their Ph.D. degrees under Gunzburger's supervision. He had also supported 11 post-doctorates.
