= Melentyev =

Melentyev, feninine: Melentyeva, also Melentiev (Russian: Мелентьев) is a Russian patronymic surname derived from the given name Melentiy (Meletius). Notable people with the surname include:

- Alexander Melentyev (1954–2015), Soviet sport shooter
- Mariya Melentyeva (1924–1942) World War II Soviet partisan
- Vasilisa Melentyeva (fl. 1575), the legendary or real sixth wife of Ivan the Terrible
- Vitaliay Melentyev (1916–1984), Russian Soviet writer
- Yuri Melentiev (born 1964), Kyrgyz sport shooter
- Yuri Melentyev (1932–1997), Soviet and Russian author, state functionary, Minister of Culture of RSFSR

== See also ==
- Meletiev
