= Meleshko =

Meleshko is a Ukrainian-language surname. Literally, it is a diminutive derived from the given name Мелёха/Мелеха (Melyokha/Melekha), which is a diminutive form of the given name Yemelyan or Meletiy/Meletius.

- Dmitry Meleshko
- Vasyl Meleshko
- Roman Meleshko
