= Emelianenko =

Emelianenko, Yemelyanenko or Emelyanenko (Russian: Емельяненко) is an East Slavic gender-neutral surname derived from the given name Yemelyan. It may refer to:

- Alexander Emelianenko (born 1981), Russian mixed martial arts fighter, brother of Fedor
- Fedor Emelianenko (born 1976), Russian mixed martial arts fighter, brother of Alexander
- Maria Emelianenko, Russian-American applied mathematician
- Vladimir Emelyanenko (born 1952), Russian astronomer
  - 5617 Emelyanenko, a minor planet named after Vladimir Emelyanenko
