= Maria Emelianenko =

Russian-American mathematician

Maria Emelianenko is a Russian-American applied mathematician and materials scientist known for her work in numerical algorithms, scientific computing, grain growth, and centroidal Voronoi tessellations. She is a professor of mathematical sciences at George Mason University.

== Education and career ==
Emelianenko earned a bachelor's degree in computer science and mathematics in 1999 and a master's degree in 2001 from Moscow State University, both summa cum laude. Her master's thesis, Numerical approach to solving Andronov–Hopf and Bogdanov–Takkens systems of differential equations, was supervised by Alexander Bratus. She then came to Pennsylvania State University for additional graduate study. She earned a second master's degree in 2002 with the thesis Analysis of Constrained Multidimensional Birth-Death Processes supervised by Natarajan Gautam. Gautam moved to Texas A&M University in 2005, and Emelianenko completed her Ph.D. the same year under the supervision of Qiang Du, with the dissertation Multilevel and Adaptive Methods for Some Nonlinear Optimization Problems.

After postdoctoral research at the Carnegie Mellon University Center for Nonlinear Analysis, Emelianenko joined the George Mason University mathematics faculty in 2007. She was promoted to full professor in 2017. At George Mason, she is also affiliated faculty with the Computational Materials Science Center, and directs the Math PhD Industrial Immersion Program.

== Activism ==
Emelianenko has acted as an activist for women in mathematics, writing of differential treatment of female faculty members in mathematics departments and of prejudice against talented women deriving from a misguided belief that their success was due to tokenism. She has been an organizer of many workshops and symposia, including several aimed at women in mathematics.
