= Omelyan =

Omelyan (Ukrainian: Омелян) is a Ukrainian surname and given name corresponding to Russian Yemelyan. Notable people with the name include:

- Volodymyr Omelyan, Ukrainian diplomat and politician
- Yaroslav Omelyan, Ukrainian artist
- Omelyan Koziy, Ukrainian diplomat
- Omelyan Kovch, Ukrainian Greek-Catholic priest
