= Qiang Du =

- Education: University of Science and Technology of China (B.S., 1983); Carnegie Mellon University (Ph.D., 1988)
- Scientific career
- Fields: Applied Mathematics
- Workplaces: Pennsylvania State University (2001-2014); Columbia University
- Doctoral advisor: Max D. Gunzburger

Qiang Du (Chinese: 杜强), the Fu Foundation Professor of Applied Mathematics at Columbia University, is a Chinese mathematician and computational scientist. Prior to moving to Columbia, he was the Verne M. Willaman Professor of Mathematics at Pennsylvania State University affiliated with the Pennsylvania State University Department of Mathematics and Materials Sciences.

== Education ==
After completing his BS degree at University of Science and Technology of China in 1983, Du earned his Ph.D. degree from Carnegie Mellon University in 1988. His thesis was written under the direction of Max D. Gunzburger.

== Selected publications ==
His two most often cited papers are

- Du, Qiang; Faber, Vance; Gunzburger, Max (1999). "Centroidal Voronoi Tessellations: Applications and Algorithms". SIAM Review. 41 (4). Society for Industrial & Applied Mathematics (SIAM): 637–676. Bibcode:1999SIAMR..41..637D. doi:10.1137/s0036144599352836. ISSN 0036-1445.
- Du, Qiang; Gunzburger, Max D.; Peterson, Janet S. (1992). "Analysis and Approximation of the Ginzburg–Landau Model of Superconductivity". SIAM Review. 34 (1). Society for Industrial & Applied Mathematics (SIAM): 54–81. doi:10.1137/1034003. ISSN 0036-1445.

== Students and post-doctorates ==
As of June 2018, 17 students had completed their Ph.D. degrees under Du's supervision. He had also supported 10 post-doctorates.

== Recognition ==
Du was elected a fellow of the Society for Industrial and Applied Mathematics in 2013 for "contributions to applied and computational mathematics with applications in material science, computational geometry, and biology." In 2017 he was elected as a Fellow of the American Association for the Advancement of Science. He was elected as a Fellow of the American Mathematical Society in the 2020 Class, for "contributions to applied and computational mathematics with applications in materials science, computational geometry, and biology".
