= Meletios Kalamaras =

His Eminence Meletios
- Metropolitan of Nikopolis & Preveza
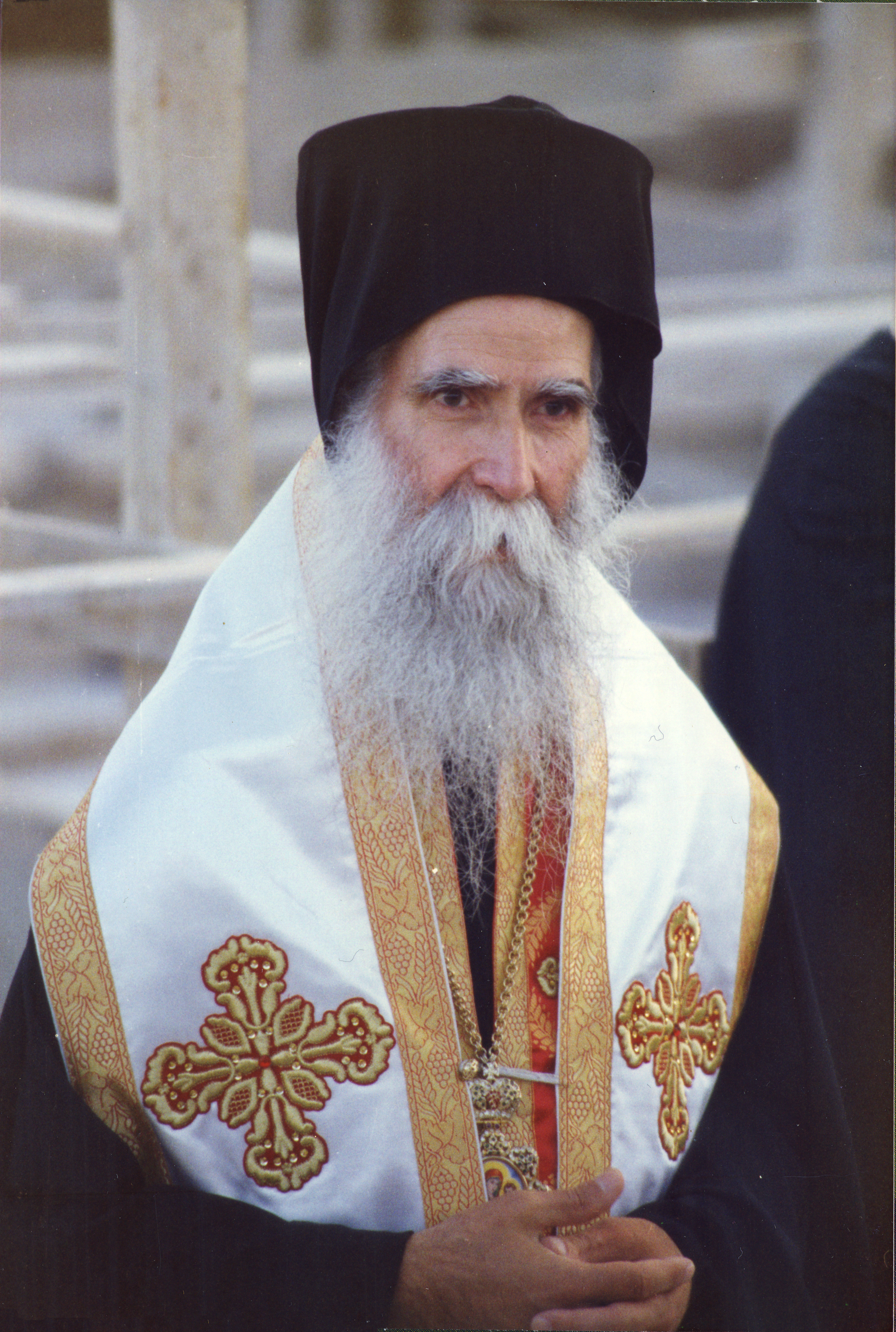
- Metropolitan Meletios in 1989
- Native name: Μελέτιος Καλαμαράς
- Church: Ecumenical Patriarchate of Constantinople
- See: Preveza
- Appointed: 26 February 1980
- Installed: 26 February 1980
- Term ended: 21 June 2012
- Predecessor: Stylianos (Kornaros)
- Successor: Chysostomos (Tsiringas)

Orders
- Ordination: 20 August 1959 by Chrysostomos (Daskalakis)
- Consecration: 26 February 1980

Personal details
- Born: Meletios Kalamaras; 28 August 1933 Alagonia, Messinia, Peloponnese, Greece
- Died: 21 June 2012 (aged 78) Flamboura, Preveza, Greece
- Buried: St. Constantine & Helen's churchyard, Preveza, Greece
- Denomination: Eastern Orthodox Christianity
- Parents: Agissilaos Kalamaras & Eleni Vassilaki
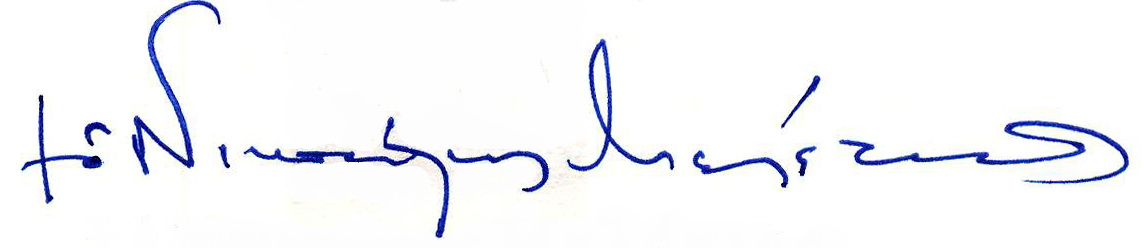
- Signature

Metropolitan Meletios (28 September 1933 – 21 June 2012) was a Greek Orthodox bishop. He was the Metropolitan of Nicopolis & Preveza for 32 years. He was appointed on 26 February 1980 and held the office until his death, 21 June 2012.

== Early life ==
Meletios Kalamaras was born in Alagonia, a small Peloponnesian village, on September 28, 1933. He was the ninth of eleven children of doctor Agesilaos Kalamaras and Eleni Vassilakis. He lived for a while in Alagonia and for a few years in Kalamata. In 1947 he went to Athens to study in the then eight-grade high school, where he lived with his aunt Evangelia, his father's cousin, who daily read the Greetings and Supplications to the Virgin Mary.

In high school, he studied at the 8th Boys' High School in Athens. Inspired by a nearby church, he pursued a degree at the University of Athens School of Theology. He graduated after studying there from 1950 to 1954, as well from the School of Philosophy of the same university, where he studied from 1954 to 1957.

== Diaconate ==
On December 28, 1954, at the age of 21, he became a monk in the Monastery of Zoodochos Pigi, Messinia, after the relative blessing from the Metropolitan of Messinia Chrysostomos Daskalakis. The bishop ordained him a deacon soon after, while he was still at the monastery. The few Kollyvades monks who kept the monastery, provided guidance for Meletios. By that time, he had mastered Ancient Greek and spoke Latin as his mother tongue. He also knew Russian, French, German, and English fluently. Because of his abilities, Chrysostomos took him from the monastery and he brought him to Kalamata in 1957.

== Priesthood ==
While he was still a deacon, Meletios was called to preach. He was a preacher in Kalamata from 1957 to 1967. He was ordained to the priesthood on August 20, 1959, by the Metropolitan of Messinia Chrysostomos I, whom he followed. In Kalamata, his life was influenced by the enormous personalities which already dominated the city, Father Ioel Yiannakopoulos (1901–1966), and Father Agathangelos Michaelidis (1908–1991), a priest from Asia Minor, protosyncellus at that time of the Metropolitan of Messinia Chrysostomos. After the death of Father Joel, Father Agathangelos was the reason that Father Meletios was firstly located at Penteli Monastery with him, and then at the Office of Orthodox and Inter-Church Relations of the Holy Synod of the Church of Greece, where he served as secretary until 1980.

In Athens he was vicar of the church of St Eleftherios, near Alexandras Avenue. Every Wednesday and Saturday he confessed in the minstrels' gallery of the church. At the Patision Student Hostel, which was near to his house, he organised meetings with students, and conducted the Great Lent Salutations to the Theotokos in the hostel's chapel. Many young students from both the church and the hostel confessed to him, several of whom formed the original dough of the Prophet Elias Monastery in Flamboura, Preveza, northwestern Greece.

His preparations for his followers to revive the Dochiariou Monastery in Mount Athos were disrupted by his election as Metropolitan of Nicopolis and Preveza.

== Episcopate ==
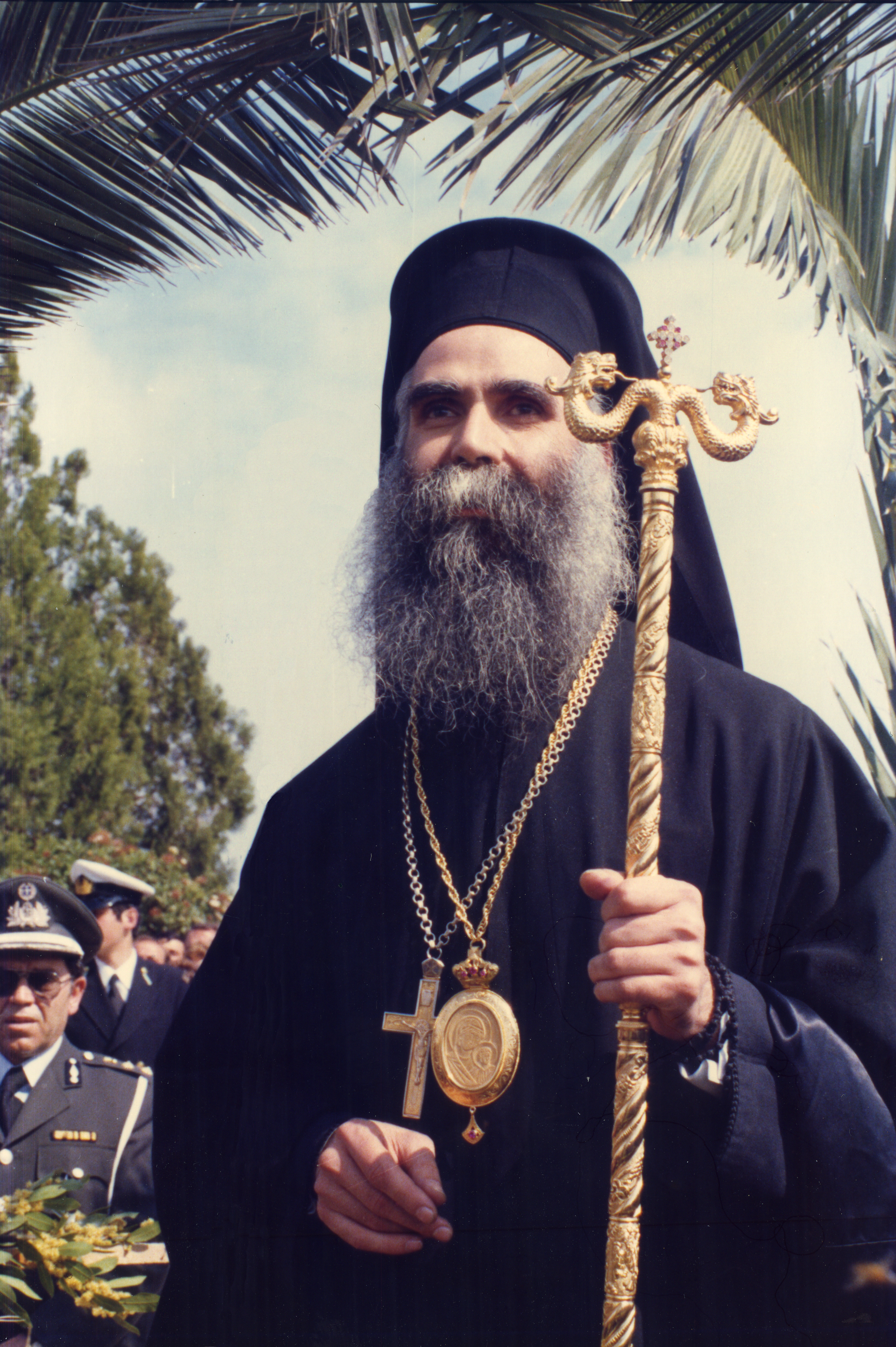
Meletios on his arrival in Preveza, March 28, 1980

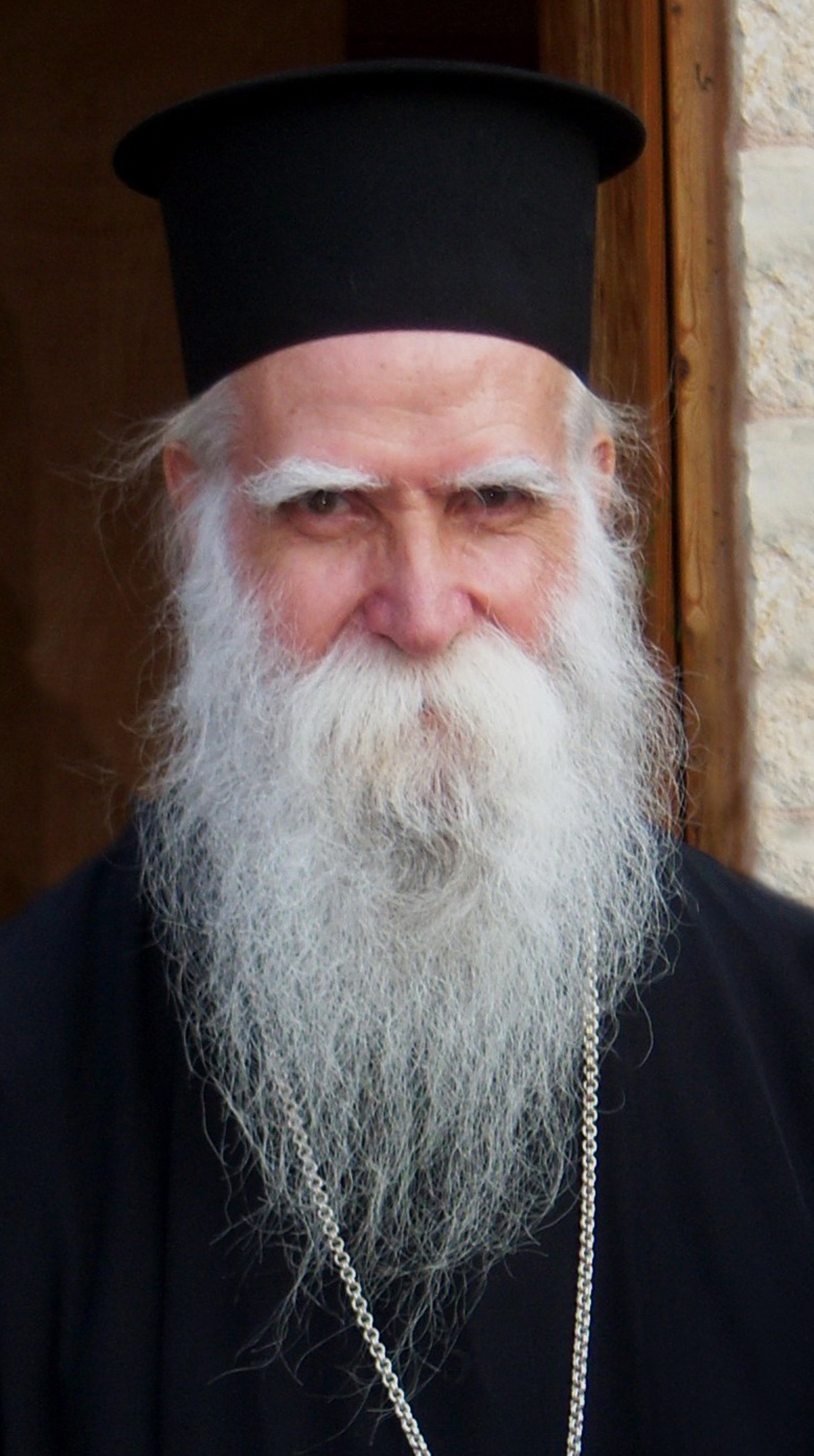
Meletios in August 2008

On February 26, 1980, the Holy Synod of the Church of Greece elected him as the next Bishop of Nicopolis and Preveza.

Meletios was consecrated bishop on Saturday, March 1, 1980, in his parish church, St. Eleftherios at Gyzi, in Athens, in the presence of eleven bishops from the Church of Greece, the Metropolitan of Nubia, and the Archbishop of Sinai.

In his ordination homily, he compared the priesthood to the Cross of Jesus.

Father Meletios and five of his spiritual children came to Preveza on March 28, 1980, which fell on the Friday before Palm Sunday. He was called to "plant" a church, in a difficult, small provincial town, scarred by its past.

The goals he set as of the first day he arrived in Preveza were:

- To restore the spiritual integrity and authenticity of the clergy,
- To restore the church experience from a spiritual, traditional and aesthetic point of view,
- To assemble the faithful into members of the One Body of Christ,
- To re-educate the people,
- To establish a model of monastic life.

He had a readiness of mind, and the right "timing" for a joke, but he was always serious in matters of faith and the duties assigned to him. He recognised the weight of the high office of being a shepherd of the faithful, and a successor of the Apostles, but he walked humbly among the people, without any pretense. Although he knew ten languages and had written treatises of high theological level, he never displayed his knowledge and preferred simplicity in his speech. He was extremely ascetic and morally disciplined, yet showed sympathy and tolerance to those he met. He abhorred political and economic activity, but handled it with foresight when it was to benefit the people spiritually. These characteristics existed in rare combination in Bishop Meletios.

== Meletios and Monastic life ==
Throughout his life Father Meletios was a true monk. Coming to Preveza and having the responsibility of priesthood in the Diocese of Nicopolis & Preveza, he naturally realized the need for monasticism, as an expression of the authenticity and freedom of the Church of Christ from conventional and seasonal forms. A dozen monks already lived near him, as well as others intending to become monks. There was no male monasticism in the Metropolis and the women's monastery of St Dimitrios at Zalongo housed a solitary elderly nun.

== Memorial ==
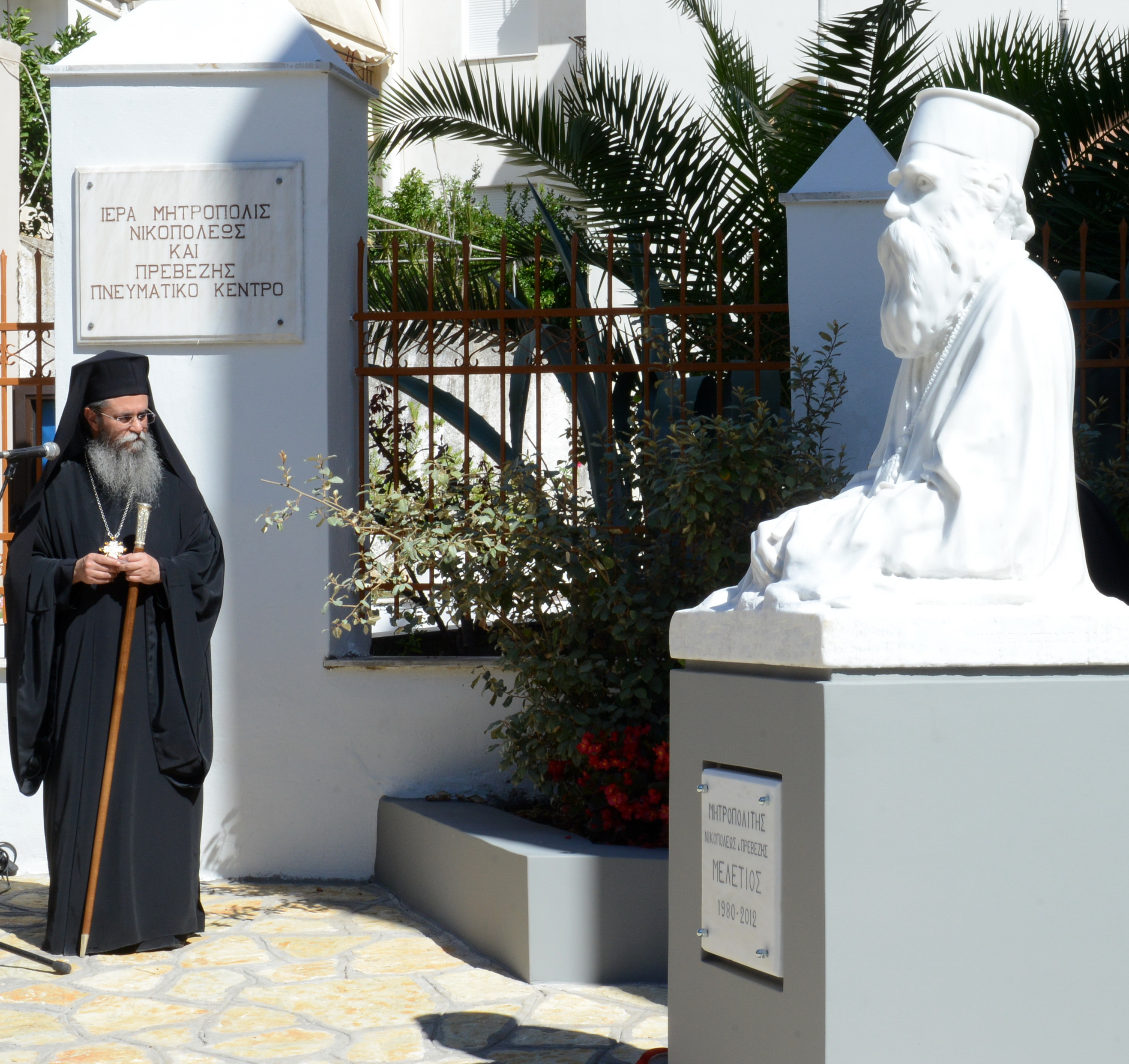
Unveiling of the marble bust of the late Metropolitan Meletios in July 2021, Preveza

On July 3, 2021, a marble bust of Father Meletios was erected in Preveza. The bust is the work of the sculptor Vangelis Rinas. Meletios' bust was sculpted out of white Dionysos marble in 2020, but due to the conditions caused by the pandemic, it was placed the following year, in the open space outside the Spiritual Centre of the Diocese of Preveza, which Meletios had established.

== Bibliography ==
- Bitzilekis, Nikolaos E. (2013). «Give me this stranger» (in Greek: «Δός μοι τοῦτον τόν Ξένον»). The First annual memorial service for fr. Meletios, late Metropolitan of Nicopolis and Preveza (21.6.2013) (in Greek). Preveza, Greece.
- Kalamaras, Meletios (2022). Jesus Christ. The praise of heart and the door of mercy (in Greek). Preveza, Greece: Ionas editions. ISBN 978-618-85924-0-7.
- Karabelas, Nikos D. (2021). Meletios, Mepropolitan of Nicopolis & Preveza (1980-2012). Unveiling of his bust (in Greek). Preveza, Greece: Ionas editions.
- Lloyd-Moffett, Stephen R. (2009). Beauty for Ashes. The Spiritual Transformation of a Modern Greek Community. Crestwood, New York: St Vladimir's Seminary Press. ISBN 978-0-88141-341-0.
- Martzouchos, Theodosios (2012). The Farewell of the clergy of the Diocese of Preveza to their Father (in Greek). Preveza, Greece.
- Paul, the Apostle (1769). First Epistle to the Corinthians. Oxford.
- Romanos, the Melodist (1963). Maas, Paul; Trypanis, Constantine A. (eds.). Sancti Romani Melodi Cantica Genuina. Oxford, UK: Oxford University Press.
- Sanidopoulos, John (June 28, 2012). "How I came to know Christ. Metropolitan Meletios of Nikopolis". johnsanidopoulos.com.
- Varden, (bishop) Erik (2022). A letter to the OCSO. Trondheim.
