= Yevgeni Dukhnov =

Russian professional football player

Personal information
- Full name: Yevgeni Sergeyevich Dukhnov
- Date of birth: 14 September 1986 (age 40)
- Place of birth: Stavropol, Russian SFSR
- Height: 1.73 m (5 ft 8 in)
- Position: Midfielder

Youth career
- SUOR Stavropol

Senior career*
Years	Team	Apps	(Gls)
2003–2004	FC Dynamo Stavropol	30	(8)
2006–2007	FC Kavkaztransgaz-2005 Ryzdvyany	40	(1)
2008–2009	FC Stavropol	11	(2)
2009	FC Stavropolye-2009	13	(1)
2010	FC Torpedo-ZIL Moscow	27	(5)
2011–2012	FC Ufa	37	(3)
2013	FC Fakel Voronezh	10	(0)
2013–2015	FC Avangard Kursk	32	(5)
2015–2016	FC Neftekhimik Nizhnekamsk	44	(4)
2017	FC Armavir	10	(0)
2017–2020	FC Sakhalin Yuzhno-Sakhalinsk	33	(4)
- * Club domestic league appearances and goals

Yevgeni Sergeyevich Dukhnov (Russian: Евгений Серге́евич Духнов; born 14 September 1986) is a Russian former professional football player.

== Club career ==
He made his Russian Football National League debut for FC Ufa on 7 August 2012 in a game against FC Rotor Volgograd.

== Personal life ==
His younger brother Vyacheslav Dukhnov is also a footballer.
