= Stavropol =

City in Stavropol Krai, Russia

Stavropol Ставрополь
- City
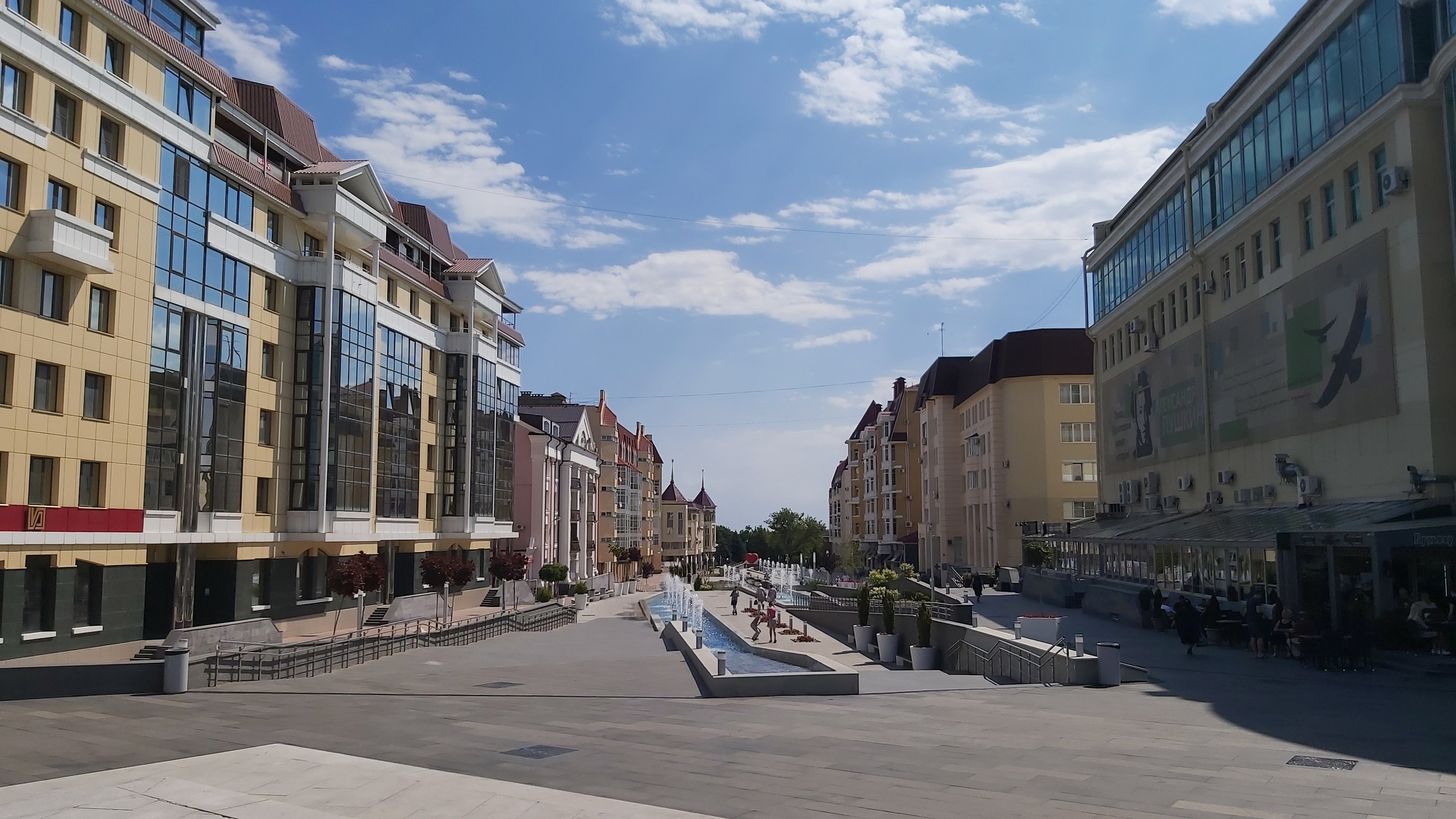
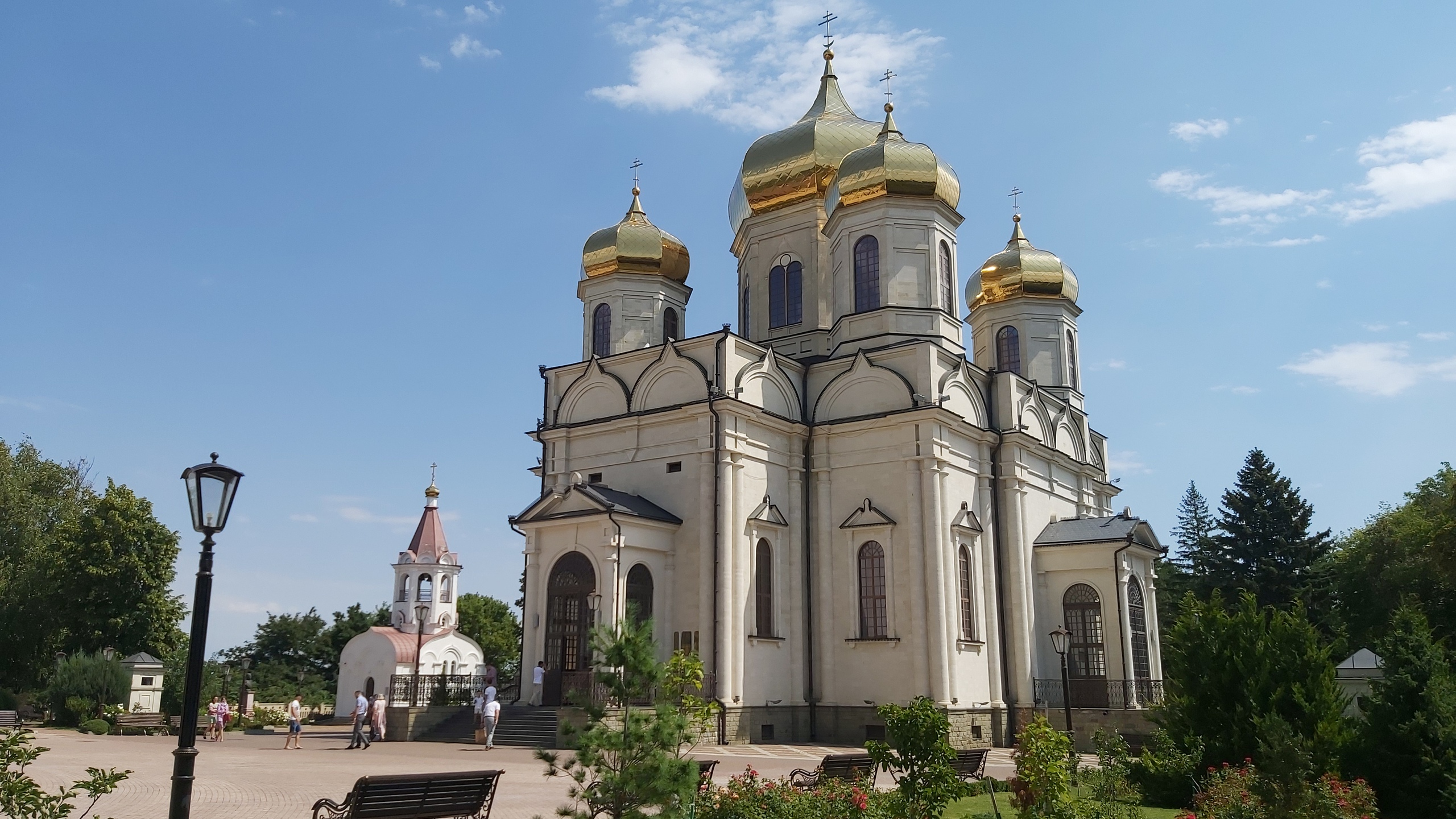
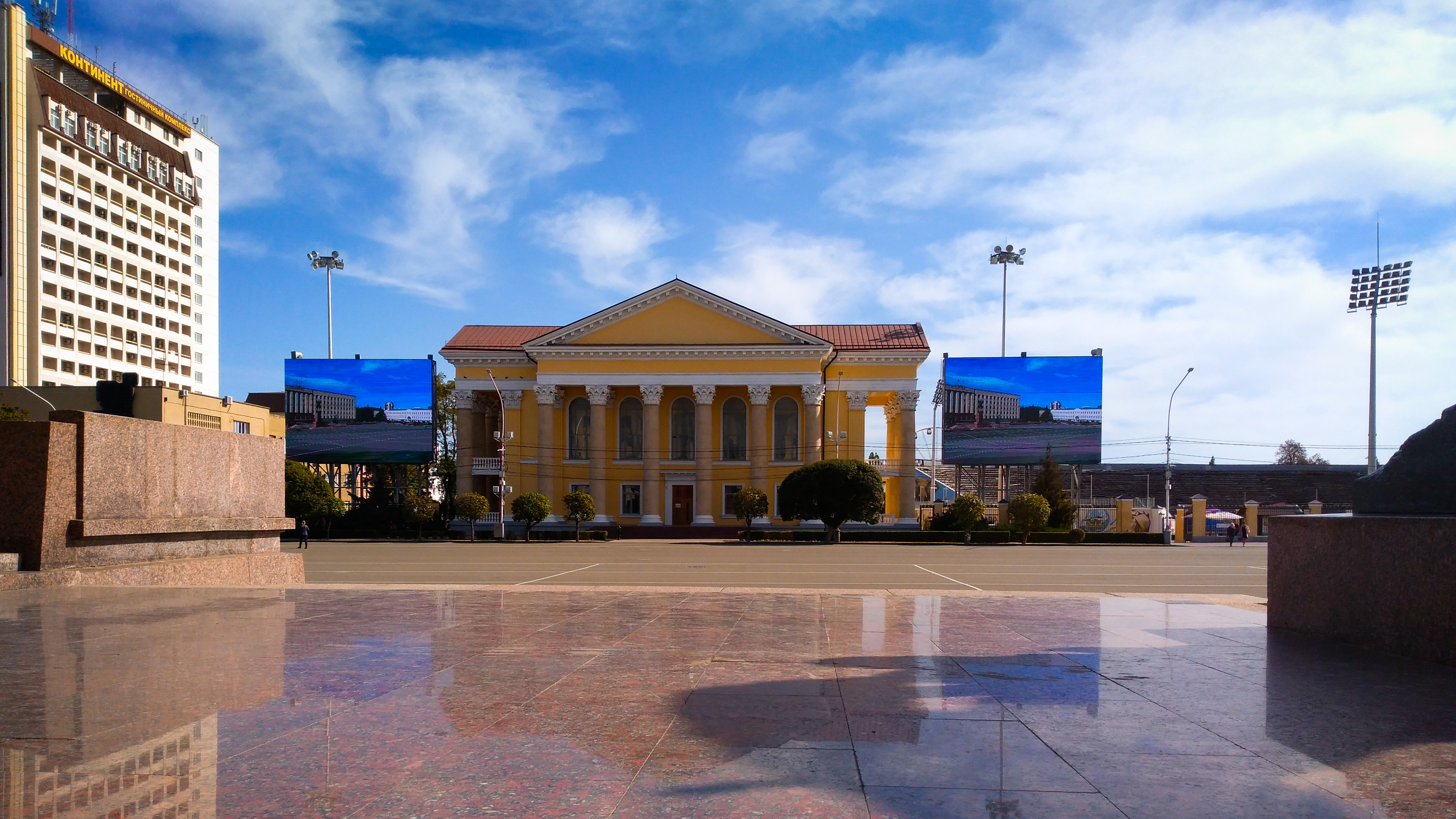
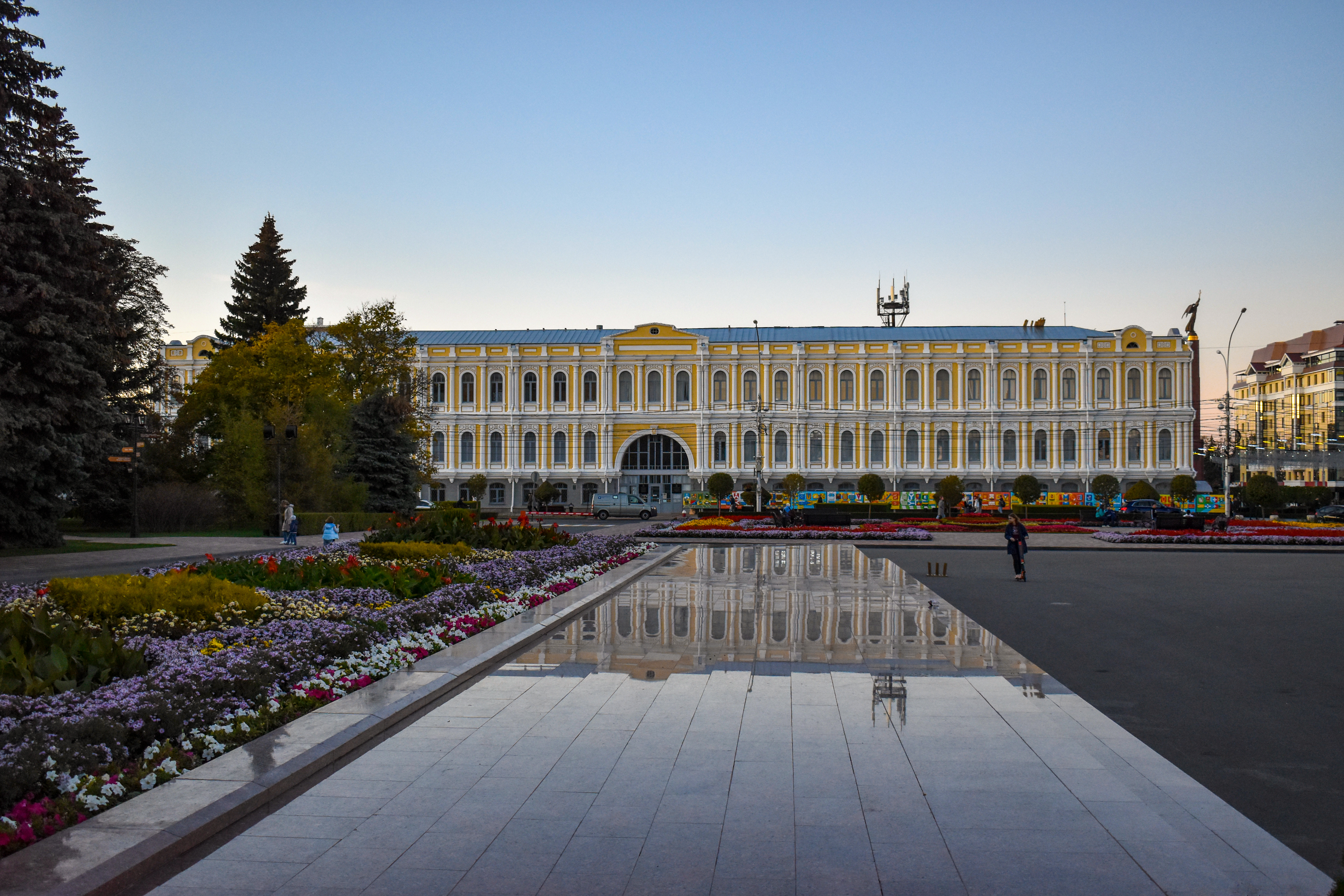
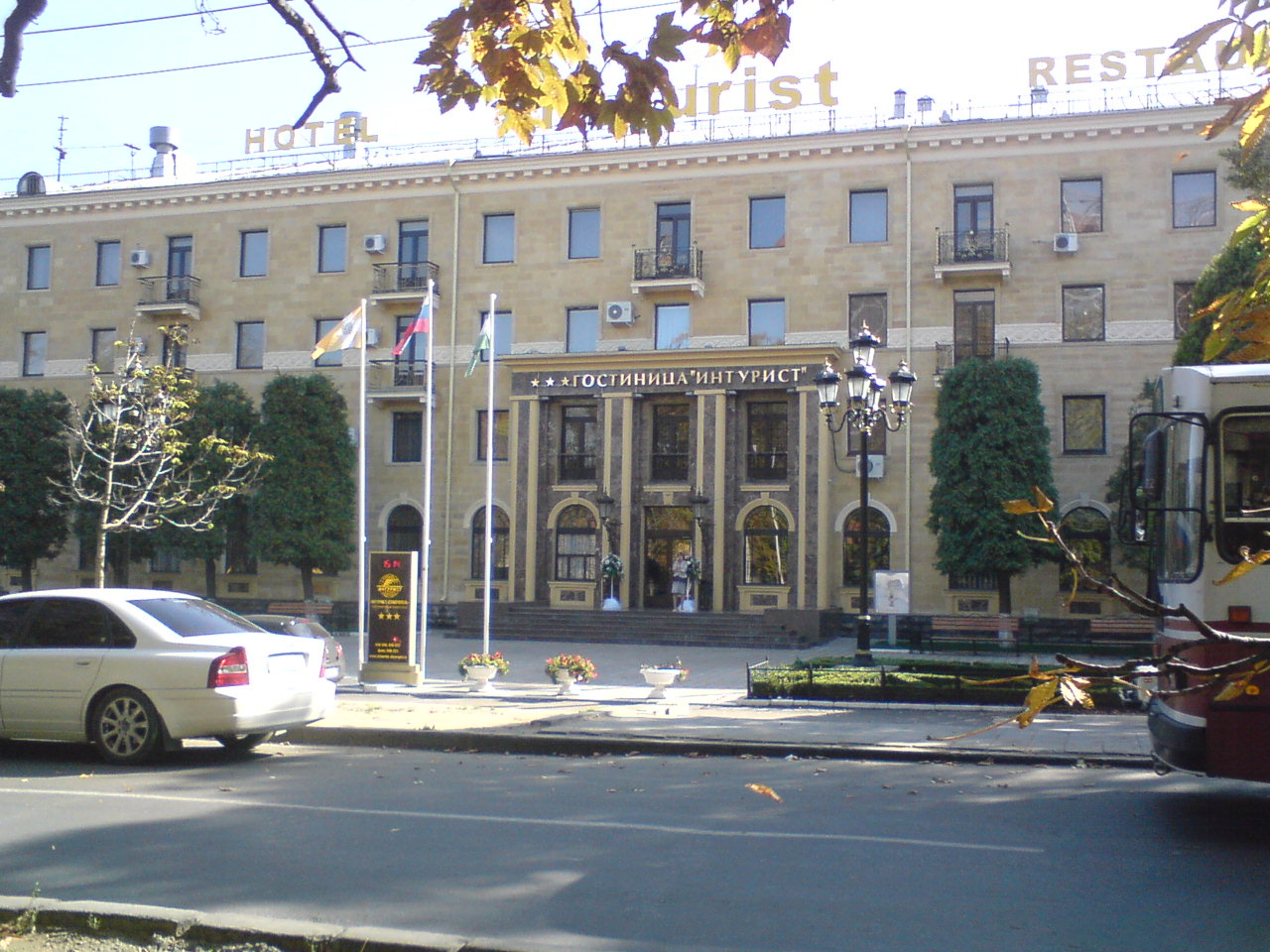
- View of downtown Kaskad Fantanov area Cathedral of the Kazan Icon Stavropol Library Stavropol State Historical, Cultural and Natural Landscape Museum Stavropol Intourist Hotel

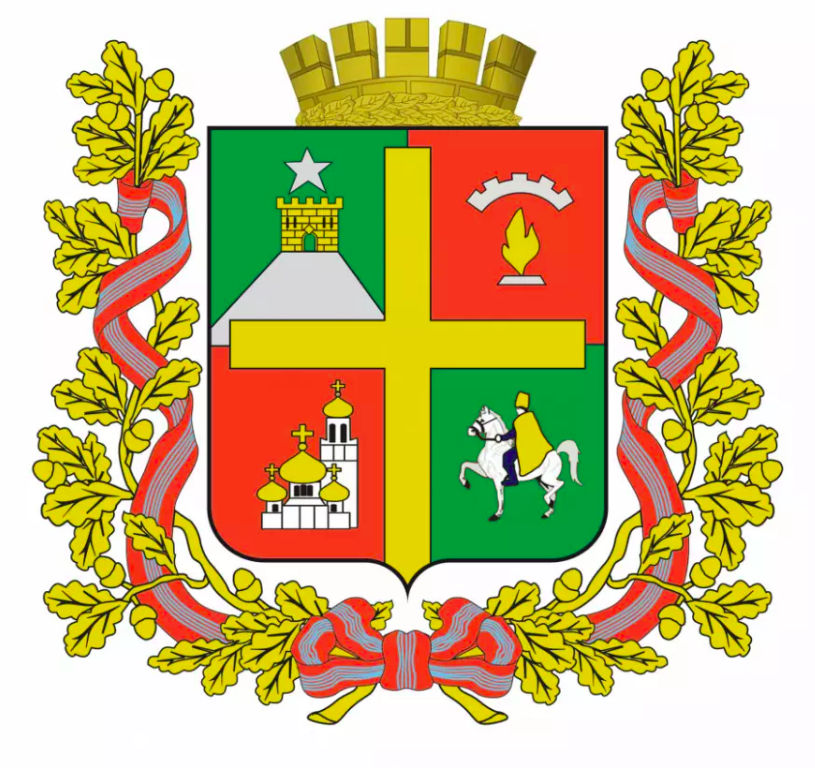
- Flag Coat of arms
- Interactive map of Stavropol
- Location of Stavropol Stavropol (European Russia) Stavropol (Russia) Stavropol (Europe)
- Coordinates: 45°03′N 41°59′E
- Country: Russia
- Federal subject: Stavropol Krai
- Founded: October 22, 1777
- City status since: 1785

Government
  - Body: City Duma
  - Mayor: Ivan Ulyanchenko
- Elevation: 620 m (2,030 ft)

Population (2010 Census)
  - Total: 398,539
  - Estimate (January 2015): 425,853 (+6.9%)
  - Rank: 47th in 2010

Administrative status
  - Subordinated to: city of krai significance of Stavropol
  - Capital of: Stavropol Krai, city of krai significance of Stavropol

Municipal status
  - Urban okrug: Stavropol Urban Okrug
  - Capital of: Stavropol Urban Okrug
- Time zone: UTC+3 (MSK)
- Postal codes: 355000–355013, 355016–355021, 355024–355026, 355028–355032, 355035, 355037–355038, 355040–355042, 355044–355045, 355047
- Dialing code: +7 8652
- OKTMO ID: 07701000001
- Website: ставрополь.рф

Stavropol (Russian: Ставрополь, IPA: [ˈstavrəpəlʲ]), known as Voroshilovsk from 1935 until 1943, is a city in and the administrative centre of Stavropol Krai, in the North Caucasus region of Southern Russia. As of the 2021 Census, its population was 547,820, and it is one of Russia's fastest growing cities.

== Etymology ==
The name Stavropol (Russian: Ста́врополь) is a Russian rendering of the Greek name Stauropolis (Ancient Greek: Σταυρούπολις 'City of the Cross'). According to legend, soldiers found a stone cross there while building the fortress in the city's future location. It is not related to Byzantine Stauroupolis (ancient Aphrodisias) in Asia Minor, nor to the city of Stavropol-on-Volga (now called Tolyatti).

== History ==
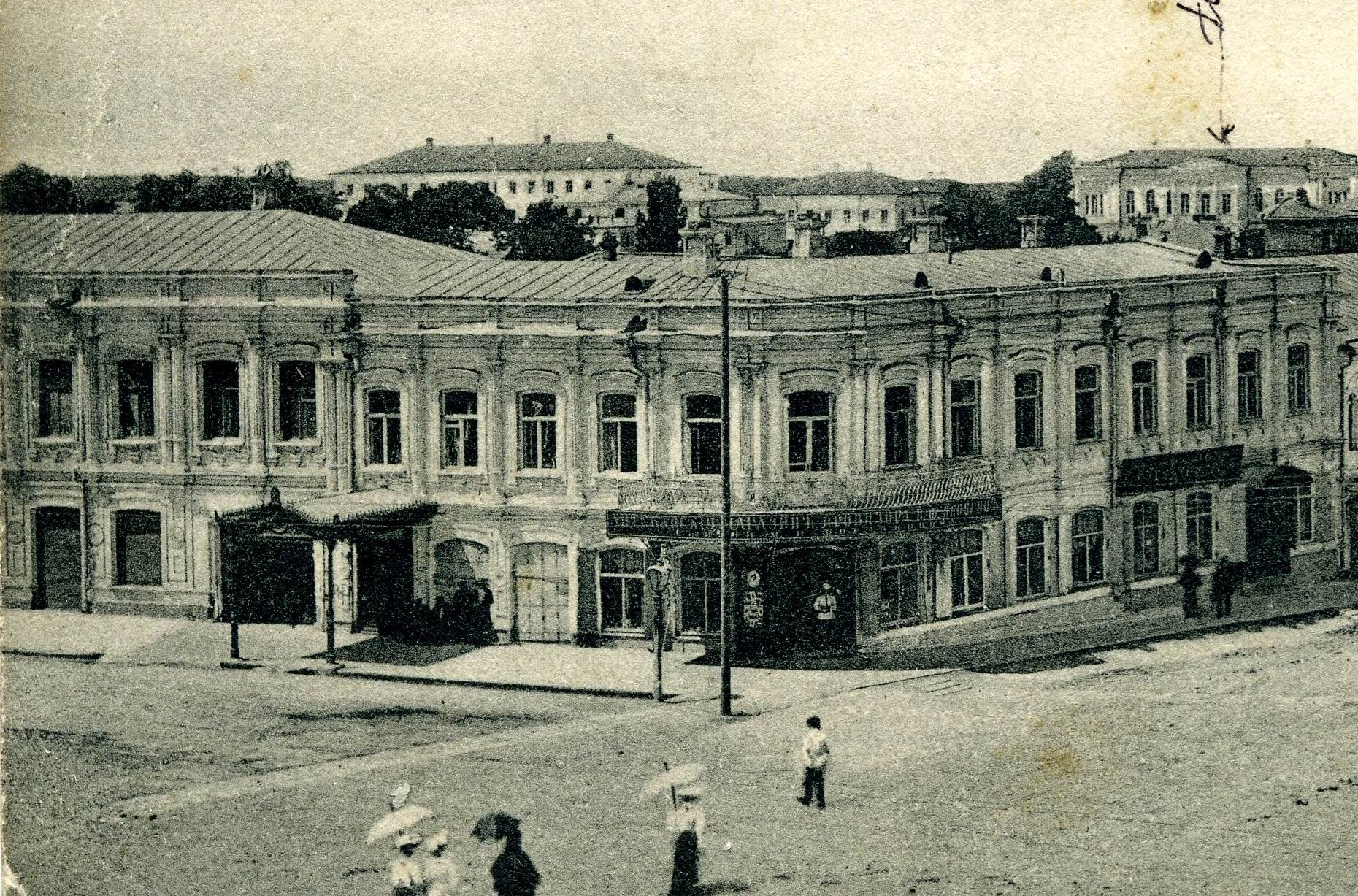
Early-20th-century view

It was founded on October 22, 1777, following the Russo-Turkish War of 1768–1774, as a military encampment, and was granted city status in 1785. Prince Grigory Potemkin, who founded Stavropol as one of ten fortresses built between Azov and Mozdok at the request of Catherine the Great, played a leading role in the creation of the city. Don Cossacks, particularly those from the Khopersky Regiment, settled the area in and around the cities of Stavropol and Georgiyevsk with a mission to defend borders of the Empire.

Alexander I in 1809 invited several Armenian families to settle by the fortress, in order to encourage trade in the region.

Stavropol's strategic location aided the Russian Empire's conquest of the Caucasus. By the early 19th century the city grew into a busy trade center of the North Caucasus. In 1843, an Episcopal see of the Russian Orthodox Church was established in Stavropol and in 1847 the city became the seat of Stavropol Governorate.

During the Russian Civil War the city changed hands several times and finally was captured by the Red Army from the Volunteer Army of general Anton Denikin on February 29, 1920. The city was renamed Voroshilovsk on May 5, 1935, after Kliment Voroshilov, but the original name was restored by decree on January 12, 1943.

World War II took a heavy toll on the city. Between August 3, 1942, and January 21, 1943, Stavropol was occupied by the Germans and its airport was used as a base for the Luftwaffe (German air force) to bomb Soviet oil supplies in Grozny. The Germans operated a subcamp of the Dulag 102 prisoner-of-war camp in the city. The city was liberated by the Soviet Army in January 1943.

Natural gas began to be extracted near the city in 1946, and a pipeline was later built to supply Moscow.

== Administrative and municipal status ==
The administrative divisions of Stavropol consist of three districts:

- Leninsky district
- Oktyabrsky district
- Promishlenny district

Stavropol is the administrative center of the krai. Within the framework of administrative divisions, it is, together with one rural locality (the khutor of Grushevy), incorporated as the city of krai significance of Stavropol—an administrative unit with the status equal to that of the districts. As a municipal division, the city of krai significance of Stavropol is incorporated as Stavropol Urban Okrug.

== Economy ==
Stavropol's economy focuses on the production of automobiles, furniture, and construction equipment and materials. The city relies on air transport through Shpakovskoye airport as well as rail and highway connections to other Russian cities.

== Demographics ==
Stavropol's 2021 population is now estimated at 453,387. In 1950, the population of Stavropol was 108,353. Stavropol has grown by 3,293 since 2015, which represents a 0.73% annual change.

Historical population

Year	Pop.	±%
1897	41,590	—
1926	57,405	+38.0%
1939	85,251	+48.5%
1959	141,023	+65.4%
1970	198,251	+40.6%

Year	Pop.	±%
1979	258,233	+30.3%
1989	318,298	+23.3%
2002	354,867	+11.5%
2010	398,539	+12.3%
2021	457,443	+14.8%

Source: Census data

== Facilities ==
Stavropol has a theater and an association football team called FC Dynamo Stavropol.

The main educational institutions of the town include North-Caucasus Federal University, Stavropol State Agrarian University, and Stavropol State Medical University.

The area of Russia in which Stavropol resides is very mountainous, placing the city in the midst of the northern Caucasus mountain range.

The city, like many other Russian cities has its own botanical garden, which covers up to 18 hectares, including 16 hectares of natural woods.

== Climate ==
Stavropol experiences a humid continental climate (Dfa), using the 0 °C (32 °F) isotherm, with short but cold winters (though mild for Russia) and hot summers. Precipitation is rather low, with a 562 millimeters (22.1 in) annual average.

Stavropol is not protected by the mountains in the winter months, so it can frequently get very cold. The lowest temperature recorded in Stavropol was −28.3 °C (−18.9 °F) on 8 February 2012, while the highest was +39.7 °C (103.5 °F) on 8 August 2006.

Climate data for Stavropol (1991-2020, extremes 1854-present)
Month	Jan	Feb	Mar	Apr	May	Jun	Jul	Aug	Sep	Oct	Nov	Dec	Year
Record high °C (°F)	16.8 (62.2)	20.9 (69.6)	30.2 (86.4)	35.0 (95.0)	32.5 (90.5)	36.3 (97.3)	38.6 (101.5)	39.7 (103.5)	37.3 (99.1)	34.2 (93.6)	24.8 (76.6)	21.9 (71.4)	39.7 (103.5)
Mean daily maximum °C (°F)	1.3 (34.3)	2.5 (36.5)	8.2 (46.8)	15.5 (59.9)	21.0 (69.8)	25.7 (78.3)	29.0 (84.2)	28.9 (84.0)	23.0 (73.4)	15.7 (60.3)	7.8 (46.0)	3.1 (37.6)	15.1 (59.2)
Daily mean °C (°F)	−2.3 (27.9)	−1.7 (28.9)	3.2 (37.8)	9.7 (49.5)	15.4 (59.7)	19.9 (67.8)	22.9 (73.2)	22.6 (72.7)	16.9 (62.4)	10.5 (50.9)	3.6 (38.5)	−0.5 (31.1)	10.0 (50.0)
Mean daily minimum °C (°F)	−5.0 (23.0)	−4.8 (23.4)	−0.4 (31.3)	5.0 (41.0)	10.5 (50.9)	15.0 (59.0)	17.4 (63.3)	16.9 (62.4)	12.0 (53.6)	6.6 (43.9)	0.5 (32.9)	−3.3 (26.1)	5.9 (42.6)
Record low °C (°F)	−27.7 (−17.9)	−28.3 (−18.9)	−19.4 (−2.9)	−10.7 (12.7)	−2.3 (27.9)	3.1 (37.6)	10.0 (50.0)	6.9 (44.4)	−3.5 (25.7)	−12.0 (10.4)	−19.9 (−3.8)	−24.3 (−11.7)	−28.3 (−18.9)
Average precipitation mm (inches)	29 (1.1)	28 (1.1)	41 (1.6)	41 (1.6)	71 (2.8)	77 (3.0)	59 (2.3)	37 (1.5)	48 (1.9)	52 (2.0)	38 (1.5)	33 (1.3)	554 (21.8)
Average rainy days	5	5	8	13	13	13	10	8	10	11	10	7	113
Average snowy days	13	13	9	1	0.3	0	0	0	0	1	6	10	53
Average relative humidity (%)	84	82	78	68	68	66	60	60	68	77	84	84	73
Mean monthly sunshine hours	85	100	133	183	257	286	313	290	228	164	94	69	2,202
Source 1: Pogoda.ru.net
Source 2: Climatebase.ru (sun)

== Notable people ==
Well-known Russians who have visited or resided in Stavropol include: Generals Alexander Suvorov (1730–1800), Alexey Yermolov (1777–1861), and Nikolay Raevsky (1771–1829); the poets Alexander Pushkin (1799–1837) and Mikhail Lermontov (1814–1841), who were in political disfavor, the surgeon Nikolay Pirogov (1810–1881), Alexander Griboyedov (1795–1829), Leo Tolstoy (1828–1910), and the national poet of Ossetia, Kosta Khetagurov.

The first and only executive president of the Soviet Union, Mikhail Gorbachev (1931–2022), was born in Stavropol Krai and spent several years working in the city of Stavropol as the head of the krai's administration. Gorbachev's chief mentor, long-time friend, and predecessor Yuri Andropov (1914–1984) was also born in Stavropol Krai.

Actor Lev Gorn (born 1971) star of The Americans, and Serge de Sazo (1915–2012) Russian born French photographer, were born in Stavropol.

An abbess of the Catholic Church of the Byzantine Rite, Serafima Meletieva was born in 1886 at Stavropol.

Piotr Mikhailovich Skarżyński (1744–1805), A Russian Major General. He served in the cavalry units of the Russian army and he commanded the Buzhan Cossacks during the Russo-Turkish War of 1787–1791, he showed heroism during the assault on Ochakov and the defense of the Kinburn fortress. He was awarded the Order of St. George. He owned an estate in Stavropol where he made wine.

Major General Pavel Klimenko was born in Stavropol, he was killed during the Russian invasion of Ukraine in November 2024.

Yevgeni Sergeyevich Dukhnov (born September 1986) former professional football player.

Matvey Safonov (born February 1999) professional football player for Paris-Saint Germain.

== Twin towns – sister cities ==
Stavropol is twinned with:

- Des Moines, United States (suspended)
- Béziers, France
- Pazardzhik, Bulgaria
- Yerevan, Armenia
- Zhenjiang, China
- Changzhou, China
