= Yemelyanovo, Zavolzhsky District, Ivanovo Oblast =

Yemelyanovo Емельяново
- Village
- Location within Ivanovo Oblast Location within Russia
- Coordinates: 57°31′N 42°02′E
- Country: Russia
- Region: Ivanovo Oblast
- District: Zavolzhsky District
- Time zone: UTC+3:00

Yemelyanovo (Russian: Емельяново) is a rural locality (a village) in Zavolzhsky District, Ivanovo Oblast, Russia. Population: 68 (2010 census);

== Geography ==
This rural locality is located 6 km from Zavolzhsk (the district's administrative centre), 88 km from Ivanovo (capital of Ivanovo Oblast) and 330 km from Moscow. Pochinok is the nearest rural locality.
