= Melenchuk =

Melenchuk is a Ukrainian-language surname. The Romanian-language spelling of the surname is Melenciuc. Notable people with the surname include:

- Jim Melenchuk (born 1953), Canadian politician
- Yemelyan Melenchuk (1871–1917), a politician from Bessarabia, Russian Empire
- Alexandru Melenciuc (born 1979), Moldovan footballer
