= Pavel Meletiev =

The Most Reverend Pavel Meletiev
- Titular Bishop of Heracleopolis Magna
- Church: Catholic; Belarusian Autocephalous Orthodox (previous)
- Installed: October 26, 1946
- Term ended: May 19, 1962
- Previous post: Bishop of Roslavl (1943–1944)

Orders
- Ordination: September 24, 1908 (deacon); 1910 (priest) by Ioaniky Kazansky and Mikhey Alekseyev
- Consecration: July 12, 1943 by Panteleimon Rozhnovsky

Personal details
- Born: November 15, 1880 Arkhangelsk, Arkhangelsk Governorate, Russian Empire
- Died: May 19, 1962 (aged 81) Bruxelles, Belgium
- Denomination: Eastern Catholicism; Eastern Orthodoxy

Pavel Meletiev (Russian: Павел Мелетьев, November 15, 1880 – May 19, 1962), born Trofim Nikolayevich Meletiev (Russian: Трофим Николаевич Мелетьев), was a bishop of the Belarusian Autocephalous Orthodox Church who became part of the Catholic Church in 1946. He was the Bishop of Roslavl in the Orthodox Church, and after becoming Catholic he was made the Titular Bishop of Heracleopolis Magna and served Russian Byzantine Catholics living abroad.

== Early life ==
Pavel Meletiev was born in Arkhangelsk, in the northern Russian Empire, on November 15, 1880, as Trofim Meletiev. Born to a Russian Orthodox family, he went to seminary and also entered the Solovetsky Monastery. Meletiev was ordained a hierodeacon on September 24, 1908, and some time in 1910 became a hieromonk (priest-monk). In 1916, he became the hegumen of the monastery and diocesan missionary in the far north of Russia.

Meletiev wrote of his early life: "Every year, I spent a vacation in the monastery. There I lived in an atmosphere of prayer and penance. This austere life of the monks are very attracted to me, and every year I gladly returned to it. This opportunity to live among them, those days spent with them in a monastery and a prayer, it was for me a source of great happiness."

== Service in the North ==
Since 1903, he was a novice in the Holy Transfiguration Monastery Solovetsky, there was tonsured. From 1908 - ierodiakon from 1910 - Fr. Exam for teacher training courses at St. Petersburg School District. Since 1916 - Superior, was a missionary diocese in the Far North. He recalled that:

Wanderers took his stick and began to visit the town after town, village to village, preaching the North bypassing Russia. I had to oblige that, to protect the faithful from lukewarmness and indifference in the faith from unbelief and atheism.

Actively opposed the Bolshevik government during the Civil War, published his "Bolshevism before the court of Divine Truth."

== Arrest, prison camp ==
In 1920, there was a missionary trip in the Pinega, where in February the same year, after the occupation troops of the Red Army of the North of Russia, was arrested. Was in custody in Arkhangelsk, in exile, recalled:

During the year and two months "the number of the Cheka," as counter-revolutionary. In 1921 was sentenced to death the revolutionary tribunal, which was commuted to 20 years imprisonment, the sentence was reduced to five years of strict isolation. In prison, subjected to new challenges:

"Members of the clergy working in the prison seemed exhausting and humiliating. Drove us to the excavation, digging ditches, the water drives the purpose to make fun of us. In the spring of standing knee-deep in cold water and dig a ditch - is sheer torture."

In 1925 was released some time in Moscow, where he helped the bishops Joasaph (Shishkov, Drelevskomu) and Peacock (Kroshechkinu). He was engaged in missionary work in Moscow, Kaluga, Serpukhov. He served in the Kazan Cathedral Church of the Kaluga diocese. In 1931 was arrested again and sentenced to seven years imprisonment in Kazakhstan. In 1937 Meletiou was released.

== Secret service ==
From 1937 to 1941 Meletiev lived in hiding:

"It was a life of constant anxiety, constant hardship and persecution. Nobody wanted to take me, no one wanted to give me shelter for the night. When at my good fortune, some kind and compassionate soul I took, she suffered from fear and anxiety."

== Activities during the Second World War ==
After the outbreak of World War II legalized in German-occupied territory. In one thousand nine hundred and forty-one - one thousand nine hundred forty-three years he served in Smolensk, Bryansk and Mogilev regions, has been elevated to the rank of Archimandrite.

On 12 July 1943 - Bishop Roslavl, vicar of the diocese of Smolensk. His department was in the city of Bryansk. Meletiev was a member of the Belarusian Orthodox Church, which recognized the jurisdiction of the Russian Orthodox Church. With him in the Bryansk region was opened 67 churches, began teaching children and adults, the law of God.

After the Soviet offensive was evacuated in Mogilev, then lived in Czechoslovakia, Austria, Germany. Established links with the Russian Orthodox Church Outside Russia, but its leaders refused to help him - he barely managed to get a temporary residence in the pantry Protection Church in Vienna. According to some, not long occupied the chair of the Vienna ROCOR. In this difficult situation, the refugee bishop helped Catholic Bishop of Regensburg Michael Buchberger.

== Catholic bishop ==
In the summer of 1946 along with her sister Abbess Serafima Meletieva joined the Catholic Church. From 1946 turned a Catholic titular bishop of the Eastern Rite. Its scope has been responsible for pastoral care of Catholic communities in the Russian Western Europe. To this end, he traveled, visiting temples, made of worship, consecrated the new church, supplied the new priests, preached.

From 1948 he lived in Belgium : first in the monastery Sheveton, and with 1951 - in Brussels, where he took an active part in the work of the Russian Catholic Centre, served in the house church, worked with Kornievski and Russian Catholic publishing house, "Life with God." In 1950, the Paris bulletin "Our parish" gave this description of Bishop Paul as making a strong impression. Despite years of hardship, contemporarises noted his gentleness, humility and forgiveness. He was characterized as a fervent servant who strictly adhered to the cherch's constitutions.The bulletin emphasized his persistent dedication to prayer, concluding that he possessed, in every sence, a great gift for prayer.

He participated in the Russian Congress of Catholic clergy in Rome in 1950, the Congress of Russian Catholics in Brussels in 1956. During the celebration of his 75th birthday said that:

"Once seriously thought about my perfect pitch for reunification with the Roman Church and came to the conclusion that he had acted correctly, my conscience is calm, peace and joy in the Lord, reign in my soul."

In January 1962 was adopted in Rome by Pope John XXIII. On 19 May 1962, Meletiev was hit by a car near the house where he lived. His funeral service was committed to the Church of the Holy Cross in Belgium. He was buried in the cemetery Woluwe-Saint-Pierre next to his sister.

== Works ==
The path of my ministry: Memories of his experiences in the Soviet Union / / Russian Catholic Herald. 1951, No. 4, 1952, No. 1. Russia and the Universal Church, 1955, No. 2 (26)., 1956, No. 1 (29), 1957, No. 2 (34), 6 (38), 1960, No. 5 (48), 1962, No. 4 (57).
