= Yemelyanovo, Vologda Oblast =

Yemelyanovo Емельяново
- Village
- Location within Vologda Oblast Location within Russia
- Coordinates: 59°10′N 39°53′E
- Country: Russia
- Region: Vologda Oblast
- District: Vologodsky District
- Time zone: UTC+3:00

Yemelyanovo (Russian: Емельяново) is a rural locality (a village) in Spasskoye Rural Settlement, Vologodsky District, Vologda Oblast, Russia. The population was 58 as of 2002. There are 20 streets.

== Geography ==
Yemelyanovo is located 7 km south of Vologda (the district's administrative centre) by road. Osanovo is the nearest rural locality.
