= Aleksandr Melekhov =

Russian footballer

Personal information
- Full name: Aleksandr Dmitriyevich Melekhov
- Date of birth: 18 January 2002 (age 24)
- Height: 1.75 m (5 ft 9 in)
- Position: Midfielder

Youth career
- Chertanovo Education Center

Senior career*
Years	Team	Apps	(Gls)
2020–2023	FC Chertanovo Moscow	22	(1)
- * Club domestic league appearances and goals

Aleksandr Dmitriyevich Melekhov (Russian: Александр Дмитриевич Мелехов; born 18 January 2002) is a Russian former football player.

== Club career ==
He made his debut in the Russian Football National League for FC Chertanovo Moscow on 22 August 2020 in a game against FC Neftekhimik Nizhnekamsk.
