= Yemelyanovskaya, Vozhegodsky District, Vologda Oblast =

Yemelyanovskaya Емельяновская
- Village
- Location within Vologda Oblast Location within Russia
- Coordinates: 60°27′N 40°09′E
- Country: Russia
- Region: Vologda Oblast
- District: Vozhegodsky District
- Time zone: UTC+3:00

Yemelyanovskaya (Russian: Емельяновская) is a rural locality (a village) in Vozhegodskoye Urban Settlement, Vozhegodsky District, Vologda Oblast, Russia. The population was 6 as of 2002.

== Geography ==
Yemelyanovskaya is located 3 km southwest of Vozhega (the district's administrative centre) by road. Yemelyanovskaya is the nearest rural locality.
