= Serafima Meletieva =

Serafima Meleteva or Serafina Rosov (born 29 April 1886) was an abbess of the Catholic Church of the Byzantine Rite, or, in other terminology belonged to the Greek Catholic Church and the Synod of the Russian traditions of the apostolate in the Russian Diaspora.

== Biography ==
Serafina Rosov was born in Stavropol, Russia on 29 April 1886 in an Orthodox family of the Old Style. Her parents were the physician Nicholas Rosov and his legal wife Julia.In 1896, Seraphina Rosov went to Saint Petersburg, and became Mother Superior in 1929. Bishop Paul Meletiev, called her his sister, nowhere in the document refer names of their parents so Abbess Seraphim could be, or his half-sister, or just a "sister in Christ."

Since 1944 in exile, in 1946, together with Bishop Paul Meletiev moved from Orthodoxy to Catholicism. Meletieva lived in the center "of the East-Christian center "at the publishing house" Life with Bohr "in Brussels participated in worship at the church of the Annunciation. She was buried in the cemetery Woluwe-Saint-Pierre in Brussels. Some documents of a personal nature, and books are available in the archives of the Abbess' Christian Russia in Seriate, Italy.
