= Yemelyan =

Yemelyan, Emelyan is an East Slavic given name derived from Latin Aemilianus. Surnames derived from it: Yemelyanov, Emelianenko. Diminutive: Yemelya. Notable people with the name include:

- Yemelyan Danilov (1627–1654), Russian bellmaker
- Yemelyan Pugachev (1742–1775), pretender to the Russian throne, led a Cossack insurrection during the reign of Catherine II
- Yemelyan Ukraintsev (1641–1708), Russian diplomat and statesman
- Yemelyan Yaroslavsky (1878–1943), Russian revolutionary, Soviet politician, communist party organizer, activist, journalist, historian

== See also ==
- Omelyan, Ukrainian counterpart
- Yemelyanovo (disambiguation)
- Emiliano
- Emilian (disambiguation)
