= Vangelis Rinas =

Greek painter and sculptor (born 1966)

- Born: 1966 (age 59–60); Samos Island, Greek
- Occupations: Painter and sculptor

Vangelis Rinas (born 1966), is a Greek painter and sculptor. He grew up in Ikaria and holds an MFA from the Athens School of Fine Arts and lives and works in Athens and New York City. Since 1992, he has exhibited in Greece and abroad, including solo shows at the National Art Museum of China in Beijing and at the Tenri Cultural Institute in New York. Since 2000, he has also presented three solo exhibitions named Endless Sailing. Some of his sculptures, which feature Chinese ideograms and Braille writing, have been installed in the National Center for the Performing Arts in Beijing.

== Selected solo exhibitions ==
- 2012 Vangelis Rinas: Palimpsests of Time, Tenri Cultural Institute, New York, N.Y, USA
- 2012 Passages: Loss, Search and Ascent, Elga Wimmer PCC Gallery, New York, N.Y, USA
- 2010 Endless Sailing III, National Art Museum of China (NAMOC), Beijing, China
- 2010 Endless Sailing III, School of Fine Arts, Shanghai University, 99 Creative Center, Shanghai, China
- 2007 Endless Sailing II, Skoufa Gallery Athens, Greece
- 2007 National Printing House of Greece Annual Calendar, Agathi Gallery, Athens, Greece
- 2005 Children's Portraits, Agathi Gallery, Athens, Greece
- 2002 Endless Sailing II, Athinais Gallery, Athens, Greece
- 2002 Communication between Painting and Photography, Adam Gallery Athens, Greece
- 2001 Water and Wind II, Adam Gallery, Athens, Greece
- 1998 Water and Wind I, Prisma Gallery, Livadia, Viotia, Greece
- 1993 First Reading, Maria Papadopoulou Gallery, Athens, Greece
- 1992 Engraving, Miranda Gallery, Hyrda Island, Greece

== Selected group exhibitions ==
- 2010 Environment Concern and Human Existence, Fourth Beijing International Art Biennale, China 2010, Beijing, China
- 2010 Taste of Brackishness II, Poseidonion Grand Hotel, Spetses island, Greece
- 2010 With the Generation of 30s as a Springboard, the Great Art Studios and the descendαnts, Glikas Gallery, Athens, Greece
- 2009 Ambassadors of Contemporary Greek Art-Three Generations of Painters, Hellenic Museum, Melbourne, Australia
- 2009 Water Colouring the Landscape, curated by Iris Kritikou, Contemporary Balkan Art Gallery, Limnos Island, Greece
- 2009 Greek Visual Artists, Viannos Gallery, Basilica of Saint Mark, Heraklion, Creta Island, Greece
- 2009 Four Seasons, Hellenic War Museum, Athens, Greece
- 2009 Modern Greek Landscape Painting from the 18th to the 21st Century - vision, experience and space regenerating, curated by B. Haris Kambouridis and M. Theocharakis Foundation for the Fine Arts and Music, Athens, Greece
- 2008 Greek Artists for the Human Rights, curated by the Human Rights Defense Center
- 2007 Visual Arts in Greece2007 - Artistic Innovation: Semiotics of its Terms in the New Age, State Museum of Contemporary Art, Salonika, Greece
- 2007 Dialogues 2007, Macedonian Museum of Contemporary Art, Salonika, Greece
- 2007 Greek Artists for the Human Rights, curated by the Human Rights Defense Center, The City of Athens Cultural Centre, Athens, Greece
- 2006 90 Greek Artists for the Human Rights, curated by the Human Rights Defense Center, The City of Athens Cultural Organization, Eleftherias Park Arts Centre, Athens, Greece
- 2005 Shall we play?, Adam Gallery, Athens, Greece
- 2005 Art Works Exhibition, curated by the Human Rights Defense Center, The City of Athens Cultural Organization, Eleftherias Park Arts Centre Athens, Greece
- 2005 Agathi Gallery, Athens, Greece
- 2005 Vision and Touch, Atrion Gallery, Salonika, Greece
- 2005 Sacred and Profane, aspects of the female in modern Greek painting 1930–2005, curated by Haris Kambouridis, Municipal Art Gallery of Chania, Creta Island, Greece
- 2003 Christmas with Greek and Russian Contemporary Art, K Gallery, London, Great Britain
- 2003 New Iconolatry, curated by Haris Kambouridis, Fine Arts Kapopoulos Gallery, Athens, Greece
- 2001 Visions and Bonds, The City of Athens Cultural Organization, Eleftherias Park Arts Centre, Athens, Greece
- 2001 Apollon Gallery, Rafina, Attica, Greece
- 1999 Anny Balta Gallery, Thessaloniki
- 1998 Municipality of Corfu Gallery, Corfu Island, Greece
- 1998 Trigono Gallery, Kifissia, Attica, Greece
- 1997 Selini Gallery, Kifissia, Attica, Greece
- 1994 Kostis Palamas Building, Athens, Greece
- 1994 A.Tassos Fine Arts Society, Athens, Greece
- 1992 Polyedro Gallery, Patra, Greece
- 1992 Maria Papadopoulou Gallery, Athens, Greece
- 1992 Municipality of Vyronas Cultural Centre (Isadora Duncan), Vyronas, Athens
- 1991 Athens School of Fine Arts Graduates Exhibition, National Art Gallery and Alexander Soutzos Museum, Athens, Greece

== Reviews ==
- Jonathan Goodman, "Vangelis Rinas: The Art of Hybridity" Vangelis Rinas: Deterioration and Renewal", Tenri Cultural Institute, New York, N.Y., USA, 2012
- Dr. Thalia Vrachopoulos, "Vangelis Rinas: Palimpsests of Time" Vangelis Rinas: Deterioration and Renewal", Tenri Cultural Institute, New York, N.Y., USA, 2012
- Mary Hrbacek, "Painting in the Present Past", NY Arts, 23 June 2012
- Dr. Thalia Vrachopoulos, "Vangelis Rinas' Passages: Loss, Search and Ascent" Vangelis Rinas Passages, May 2012
- Liu Dawei, "He is sailing from the Aegean, First Personal Exhibition of the Greek Artist Vangelis Rinas in China", Endless Sailing III National Art Museum of China, March 2010
- Harris Kambouridis, "In the Harmonious Sway of Myth," Endless Sailing III National Art Museum of China, March 2010
- Annita Patsouraki, "Infinitive Voyage", Prayer for those who sail well in the seas," Vangelis Rinas; Endless Sailing II, 2007
- Haris Kambouridis, "With Art as a Valuable Cargo," Vangelis Rinas; Endless Sailing II, 2007
- Haris Kambouridis, "Molding the Clay with Color", Ta Nea, 28 December 2005
- Dora Iliopoulou-Rogan, "Endless sailing," Vangelis Rinas: Endless Sailing, 2002
- Nasa Patapiou, "I have ventured upon a great sea..." Vangelis Rinas: Endless Sailing, 2002
- Haris Kambouridis, "Shipbuilding for the voyage of art," Vangelis Rinas: Endless Sailing, 2002
- Dora Iliopoulou-Rogan, "Into the Inner Recesses" Vangelis Rinas, March 2001
- Haris Kambouridis, "Spark of Resurrection", Ta Nea, 18 April 2001
- Lena Pappa, "In a closed Room," Vangelis Rinas, March 1993

== Bibliography ==
- Vangelis Rinas: Palimpsests of Time. Catalogue. New York, 2012
- Vangelis Rinas Passages. Catalogue. New York: Elga Wimmer PCC Gallery, 2012
- Zacharias Sokos, "Vangelis Rinas_The Painter", Apostrofos, Third program of Greek National Radio, 20 February 2012
- Zacharias Sokos, "Vangelis Rinas_The Painter", Apostrofos, Ert webtv, ErtWorld, 26 February 2012
- First Visit of the Opera of Beijing
- The Album of the Fourth Beijing International Art Biennale, China 2010. Catalogue. Beijing China: People's Fine Arts Publishing House, 2010, 53
- Nadia Soufli, "Vangelis Rinas" Hot Harbor, August 2010, 69–76
- Yiannis Moutsos, "Endless Sailing to China" Gentleman, July 2010, 110–111
- Nikos Vatopoulos, "A wooden Boat to China" Kathimerini, 18 July 2010, 1
- Annita Patsouraki, "Vangelis Rinas, Endless Sailing" The World of Metro, June 2010, no. 52, 7–9
- " The Greek Artist Vangelis Rinas "Endless Sailing III" exhibition opening, Artonline, 23 April 2010
- "Greek Artist Rinas: Chinese Ideograms carving the Wooden Symbol of Cultural Expansion" China News, 9 March 2010
- Endless Sailing III National Art Museum of China. Catalogue. Beijing, China: China Federation of Literary and Art Circles Publishing Co., March 2010
- Liang Yeqian, "Greek Painter Rinas" Xinhua News Agency, 3 March 2010
- "The First Greek Painter Rinas' Exhibition in the National Art Museum", 9 March 2010
- "The Greek Artist Vangelis Rinas "Endless Sailing III" exhibition opening", Finance 17ok, 10 March 2010
- Nikos Vatopoulos, "A Tale of two Countries' Friendship", Ekathimerini, 3 March 2010
- Vangelis Rinas from Greece holds solo exhibition, National Art Museum of China News, March 2010
- "The first Greek painter works visit the National Art Museum of China", News.99ys, March 2010
- "The First Greek Painter works visit the National Art Museum of China", macauart.net, March 2010
- "The first Greek painter works visit the National Art Museum of China", Art.China, March 2010
- National Art Museum of China Art Show, March 2010, no.3
- Katerina Zaharopoulou, "The Age of Images" ET-1 program, Greek TV, 15 March 2007
- Vivi Vasilopoulou, "Traveling" Ependytis, 24 February 2010
- Marilena Astrapelou, "A Long Journey with Canvas", Vimagazino, 21 February 2010, no. 488, 52–55
- China Greece Times, Europe Weekly, 14 February 2010 no. 5
- Myrto Raftopoulou, "Endless Sailing II", Efoplistis, April 2007, 124–127
- Vangelis Rinas; Endless Sailing II. Catalogue. Athens, Greece: Skoufa Gallery, 2007
- Phivi Paraskeva, "A Visual Journey in the World of Subconscious", Proto Thema, 3 April 2007
- Visual Arts in Greece 2007-Artistic Innovation: Semiotics of its Terms in the New Age, Modern Greek Arts Archives, Catalogue. Salonika, Greece: State Museum of Contemporary Art, 2007, 157
- Kyriakos Valavanis, Kritiki Logou kai Techis, 2007, no. 5
- "Boat in the Air", Eleftherotypia, 22 March 2002, 30
- Vangelis Rinas: Endless Sailing. Catalogue. Athens, Greece: March 2002
- "If you ever see a boat in the land…", Ta Nea, 19 March 2002
- Vangelis Rinas. Catalogue. Athens, Greece: March 2001
- Panos Bailis, "The Hope does have a Face", Ta Nea, 18 February 1994
- Vangelis Rinas, Catalogue. Athens, Greece: Maria Papadopoulou Gallery, 1993
- Vangelis Kechriotis, "Faces in a closed Room" Avgi, March 1993
- Dimitris Mitropoulos, "Visual Athens Today" Taxydromos, 14 July 1993

== Selected public collections ==
- National Center for the Performing Arts (The Opera of Beijing), Beijing, China
- Beijing International Art Biennale Collection, Beijing, China
- Hellenic Parliament, Athens, Greece
- National Bank of Greece, London
- Commercial Bank of Greece, Athens, Greece
- Municipal Gallery of Corfu Island, Greece
- Municipal Gallery of Viannos, Crete Island, Greece
