= Computational scientist =

Not be Confused with Computer Scientist

A computational scientist is a person skilled in scientific computing. This person is usually a scientist, a statistician, an applied mathematician, or an engineer who applies high-performance computing and sometimes cloud computing in different ways to advance the state-of-the-art in their respective applied discipline; physics, chemistry, social sciences and so forth. Thus scientific computing has increasingly influenced many areas such as economics, biology, law, and medicine to name a few. Because a computational scientist's work is generally applied to science and other disciplines, they are not necessarily trained in computer science specifically, though concepts of computer science are often used. Computational scientists are typically researchers at academic universities, national labs, or tech companies.

One of the tasks of a computational scientist is to analyze large amounts of data, often from astrophysics or related fields, as these can often generate huge amounts of data. Computational scientists often have to clean up and calibrate the data to a usable form for an effective analysis. Computational scientists are also tasked with creating artificial data through computer models and simulations.
