= Meletius =

Meletius or Meletios (Greek: Μελέτιος) is a given name of Greek origin: μελέτη ('care', 'attention') + -ιος, a suffix of relation, i.e., meaning "caring", "attentive". Notable people with the name include:

== Saints ==
- Meletius I of Antioch (died 381), Patriarch of Antioch 360–381
- Meletios the Younger (died c. 1105), monk and pilgrim
- Meletius I of Constantinople (1549–1601), locum tenens Ecumenical Patriarch of Constantinople 1597–1598 (same as Meletius I of Alexandria)

== Patriarchs ==
- Meletius of Jerusalem, Patriarch of Jerusalem from 1731 to 1737
- Meletius II of Constantinople (died 1780), Ecumenical Patriarch of Constantinople 1768–1769
- Meletius III of Constantinople (1772–1845), Ecumenical Patriarch of Constantinople in 1845
- Meletius II of Antioch (1837–1906), Patriarch of Antioch 1899–1906
- Meletius IV of Constantinople (1871–1935), Ecumenical Patriarch of Constantinople 1921–1923 (same as Meletius II of Alexandria)

== Other people ==
- Melitius of Lycopolis (died 327), bishop and founder of the Melitians
- Meletius Smotrytsky (c. 1577 – 1633), archbishop and proposed saint
- Meletius Tipaldi (died 1713), Orthodox turned Uniate bishop
- Meletis Vasileiou (died 1826)
- Meletios Kalamaras (1933–2012), late Metropolitan of Nicopolis and Preveza
