= Yartsevo =

Yartsevo (Russian: Ярцево) is the name of several inhabited localities in Russia.

Urban localities

- Yartsevo, Smolensk Oblast, a town in Yartsevsky District of Smolensk Oblast; administratively incorporated as Yartsevskoye Urban Settlement

Rural localities

- Yartsevo, Bryansk Oblast, a selo in Zapolskokhaleyevichsky Selsoviet of Starodubsky District of Bryansk Oblast
- Yartsevo, Ivanovo Oblast, a village in Yuryevetsky District of Ivanovo Oblast
- Yartsevo, Kaluga Oblast, a village in Dzerzhinsky District of Kaluga Oblast
- Yartsevo, Kirov Oblast, a village under the administrative jurisdiction of the urban-type settlement of Lalsk in Luzsky District of Kirov Oblast
- Yartsevo, Kostroma Oblast, a village in Knyazhevskoye Settlement of Makaryevsky District of Kostroma Oblast
- Yartsevo, Krasnoyarsk Krai, a selo in Yartsevsky Selsoviet of Yeniseysky District of Krasnoyarsk Krai
- Yartsevo, Moscow, a village in Mikhaylovo-Yartsevskoye Settlement of Moscow
- Yartsevo, Dmitrovsky District, Moscow Oblast, a village under the administrative jurisdiction of the Town of Yakhroma in Dmitrovsky District of Moscow Oblast
- Yartsevo, Stupinsky District, Moscow Oblast, a village in Aksinyinskoye Rural Settlement of Stupinsky District of Moscow Oblast
- Yartsevo, Nizhny Novgorod Oblast, a village in Bolsheokulovsky Selsoviet of Navashinsky District of Nizhny Novgorod Oblast
- Yartsevo, Lyubytinsky District, Novgorod Oblast, a village under the administrative jurisdiction of the urban-type settlement of Lyubytino in Lyubytinsky District of Novgorod Oblast
- Yartsevo, Parfinsky District, Novgorod Oblast, a village in Polavskoye Settlement of Parfinsky District of Novgorod Oblast
- Yartsevo, Novosokolnichesky District, Pskov Oblast, a village in Novosokolnichesky District, Pskov Oblast
- Yartsevo, Opochetsky District, Pskov Oblast, a village in Opochetsky District, Pskov Oblast
- Yartsevo, Palkinsky District, Pskov Oblast, a village in Palkinsky District, Pskov Oblast
- Yartsevo, Tula Oblast, a village in Krapivenskaya Rural Administration of Shchyokinsky District of Tula Oblast
- Yartsevo, Tver Oblast, a village in Toporovskoye Rural Settlement of Sandovsky District of Tver Oblast
- Yartsevo, Vladimir Oblast, a village in Selivanovsky District of Vladimir Oblast
- Yartsevo, Babayevsky District, Vologda Oblast, a village in Toropovsky Selsoviet of Babayevsky District of Vologda Oblast
- Yartsevo, Cherepovetsky District, Vologda Oblast, a village in Abakanovsky Selsoviet of Cherepovetsky District of Vologda Oblast
- Yartsevo, Totemsky District, Vologda Oblast, a village in Vozhbalsky Selsoviet of Totemsky District of Vologda Oblast
- Yartsevo, Soshnevsky Selsoviet, Ustyuzhensky District, Vologda Oblast, a village in Soshnevsky Selsoviet of Ustyuzhensky District of Vologda Oblast
- Yartsevo, Zalessky Selsoviet, Ustyuzhensky District, Vologda Oblast, a village in Zalessky Selsoviet of Ustyuzhensky District of Vologda Oblast
- Yartsevo, Vozhegodsky District, Vologda Oblast, a village in Vozhegodsky Selsoviet of Vozhegodsky District of Vologda Oblast
- Yartsevo, Nekouzsky District, Yaroslavl Oblast, a village in Spassky Rural Okrug of Nekouzsky District of Yaroslavl Oblast
- Yartsevo, Yaroslavsky District, Yaroslavl Oblast, a village in Tunoshensky Rural Okrug of Yaroslavsky District of Yaroslavl Oblast
