= Luza =

Luza or Luža may refer to:

- Luza (river), a river in Russia, a right tributary of the Yug
- Luza, Luzsky District, Kirov Oblast, a town in Luzsky District of Kirov Oblast, Russia
- Luža, Kočevje, former settlement in southern Slovenia
- Luža, Trebnje, a settlement in eastern Slovenia

== People with the surname ==
- Dave Luza (born 1974), Dutch improv comedian
- Gustavo Luza (born 1962), former tennis player from Argentina
- Lechedzani Luza (born 1978), boxer from Botswana

== See also ==
- Luza (inhabited locality), a list of inhabited localities in Russia
- Luzsky (disambiguation)
