= Demidovsky (rural locality) =

Demidovsky (Russian: Демидовский; masculine), Demidovskaya (Демидовская; feminine), or Demidovskoye (Демидовское; neuter) is the name of several rural localities in Russia:

- Demidovsky, Republic of Bashkortostan, a khutor in Suslovsky Selsoviet of Birsky District in the Republic of Bashkortostan
- Demidovsky, Nizhny Novgorod Oblast, a pochinok in Gorevsky Selsoviet of Urensky District in Nizhny Novgorod Oblast
- Demidovsky, Rostov Oblast, a khutor in Tubyanskoye Rural Settlement of Verkhnedonskoy District in Rostov Oblast
- Demidovskoye, Arkhangelsk Oblast, a selo in Rovdinsky Selsoviet of Shenkursky District in Arkhangelsk Oblast
- Demidovskoye, Yaroslavl Oblast, a village in Volzhsky Rural Okrug of Rybinsky District in Yaroslavl Oblast
- Demidovskaya, Kargopolsky District, Arkhangelsk Oblast, a village in Kalitinsky Selsoviet of Kargopolsky District in Arkhangelsk Oblast
- Demidovskaya, Krasnoborsky District, Arkhangelsk Oblast, a village in Belosludsky Selsoviet of Krasnoborsky District in Arkhangelsk Oblast
- Demidovskaya, Velsky District, Arkhangelsk Oblast, a village in Puysky Selsoviet of Velsky District in Arkhangelsk Oblast
- Demidovskaya, Kirov Oblast, a village under the administrative jurisdiction of the Town of Luza in Luzsky District of Kirov Oblast; 60°38′N 47°25′E
- Demidovskaya, Syamzhensky District, Vologda Oblast, a village in Dvinitsky Selsoviet of Syamzhensky District in Vologda Oblast
- Demidovskaya, Tarnogsky District, Vologda Oblast, a village in Shevdenitsky Selsoviet of Tarnogsky District in Vologda Oblast
