= Veliky Ustyug =

Town in Vologda Oblast, Russia

Veliky Ustyug Великий Устюг
- Town
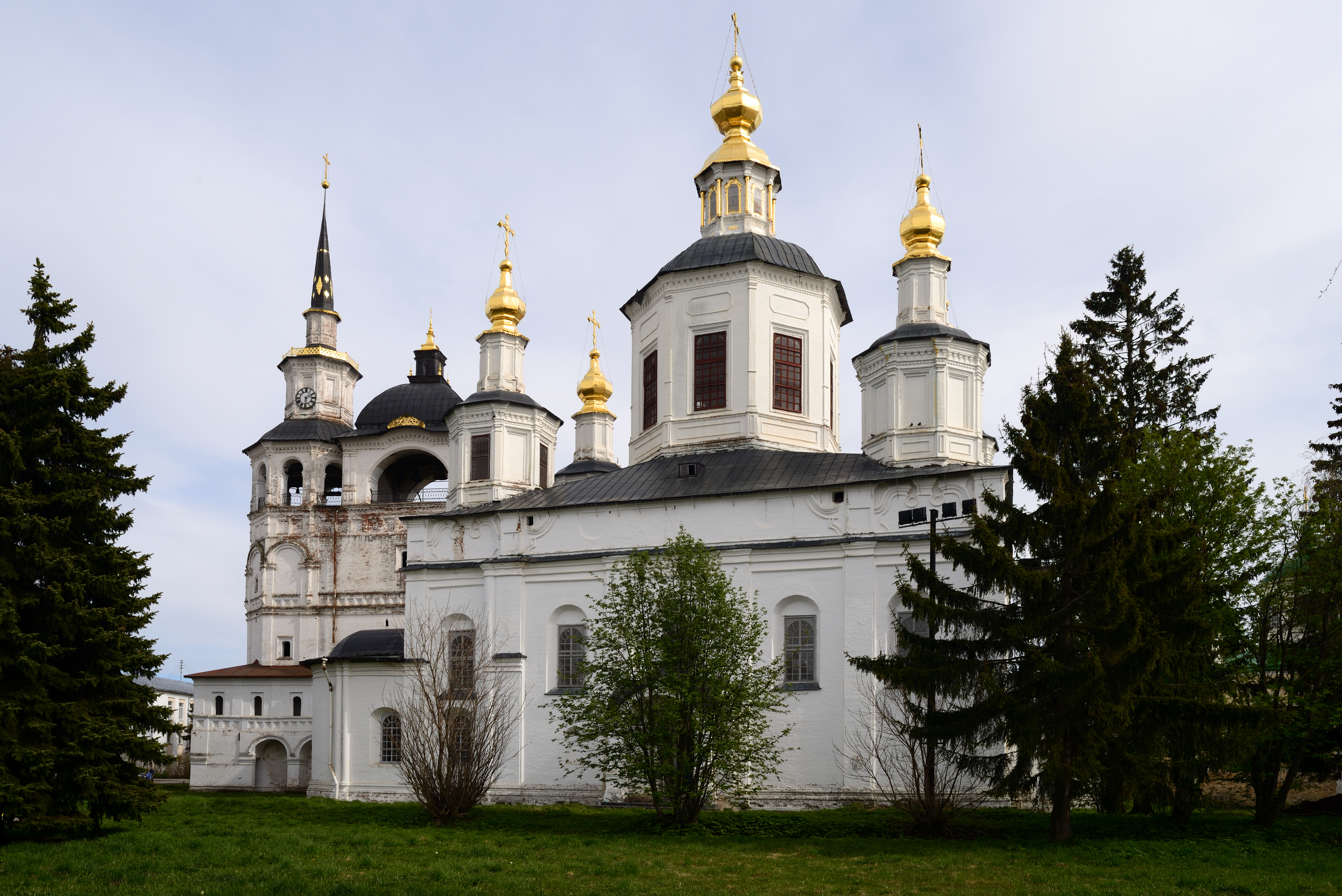
- Assumption Cathedral Children’s Museum Centre Diocesan school

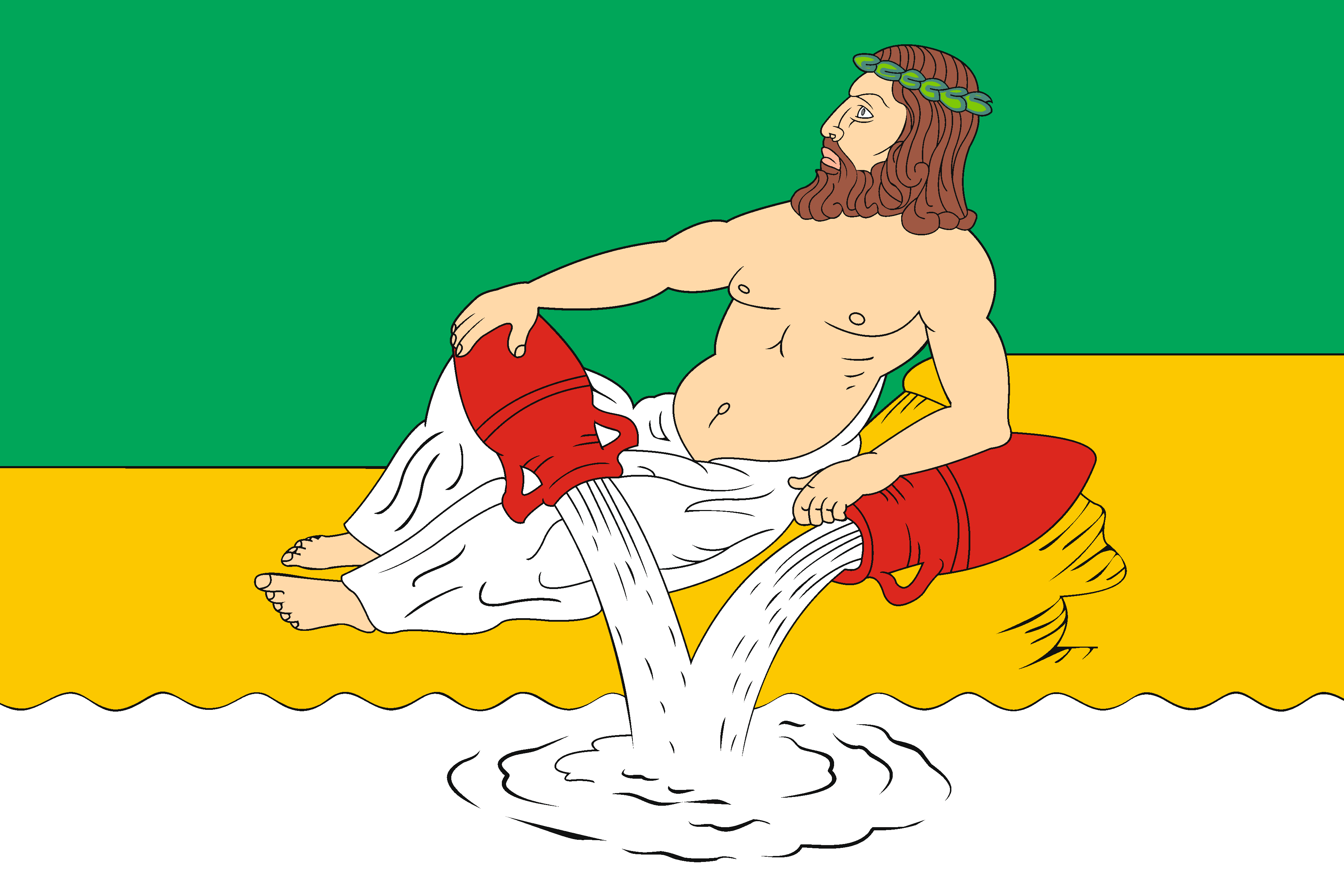
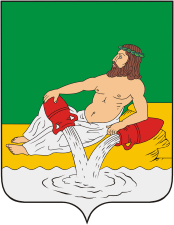
- Flag Coat of arms
- Interactive map of Veliky Ustyug
- Location of Veliky Ustyug Veliky Ustyug (Europe) Veliky Ustyug (Russia)
- Coordinates: 60°46′N 46°18′E
- Country: Russia
- Federal subject: Vologda Oblast
- First mentioned: 1207
- Elevation: 62 m (203 ft)

Population (2010 Census)
  - Total: 31,665
  - Estimate (2023): 28,266 (−10.7%)

Administrative status
  - Subordinated to: town of oblast significance of Veliky Ustyug
  - Capital of: Velikoustyugsky District, town of oblast significance of Veliky Ustyug

Municipal status
  - Municipal district: Velikoustyugsky Municipal District
  - Urban settlement: Veliky Ustyug Urban Settlement
  - Capital of: Velikoustyugsky Municipal District, Veliky Ustyug Urban Settlement
- Time zone: UTC+3 (MSK)
- Postal codes: 160839, 162390, 162391, 162393, 162394, 162396, 162399
- Dialing code: +7 81738
- OKTMO ID: 19614101001
- Website: www.movustug.ru

Veliky Ustyug (Russian: Вели́кий У́стюг) is a town in Vologda Oblast, Russia, located in the northeast of the oblast at the confluence of the Sukhona and Yug Rivers. As of the 2010 Census, its population was 31,665.

Veliky Ustyug has a great historical significance and was one of the major cities of the Russian North. It preserved some of the past urban structure and many of the architectural monuments. It has lost its former leading role and is nowadays mostly known for tourism.

== Location and etymology ==
Veliky Ustyug is close to the confluence of the Sukhona (flowing from the west) and the Yug (from the south) rivers. Downstream from this confluence the rivers form a single waterway known as the Northern Dvina, sometimes referred to as the Little Northern Dvina. The historical center of the town is on the left (high) bank of the Sukhona and, in contrast to many historical Russian towns, there is an embankment along the Sukhona.

Dymkovskaya Sloboda and Troitse-Gledensky Monastery are on the right bank of the Sukhona. New parts of the town, mostly industrial areas, face the Northern Dvina. The only bridge in Veliky Ustyug is across the Sukhona upstream of the town center.

Previously, Gleden was a fortress, and the left bank of the Sukhona was a posad—a territory outside the fortress populated by craftsmen. In the 15th century, the fortress was destroyed in an attack by Vyatka army, and the new fortress was built in the former posad area. The fortress was demolished when it became apparent than no military threat to Veliky Ustyug exists.

The first recorded settlement in the area was the monastic settlement at Gleden (Гледен), founded near the confluence of the Yug and the Sukhona, where Troitsko-Gledensky Monastery is now. The name Ustyug means "the mouth of the Yug". By the late 15th century, the name changed to Veliky (Great) Ustyug.

== History ==
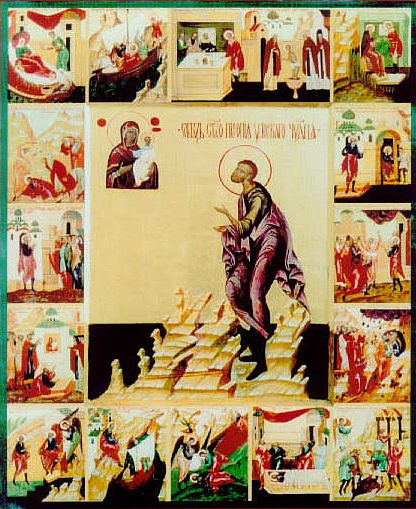
St. Prokopy, the Ustyug icon from 1669, Velikoustyugsky Museum of History, Art, and Architecture

The town of Veliky Ustyug was first mentioned in a chronicle in 1207. In 1212, Mikhaylo-Arkhangelsky Monastery was founded. It was a part of the Vladimir-Suzdal Principality (in contrast to the neighboring lands, most notably Totma, colonized by Novgorod). Thus Veliky Ustyug created the only obstacle to Novgorod's trade with the north, as the Sukhona and the Northern Dvina were the main waterways connecting Novgorod with the White Sea. Clashes between Novgorod and Ustyug became regular, especially throughout the whole 14th century. In 1328, Ustyug was annexed by the Grand Duchy of Moscow.

The town was not immediately affected by the Mongol invasion of Rus' in the 13th century; however, its rapid growth in the second half of the century was due to influx of refugees from Central Russia.

In the 15th century, Veliky Ustyug became notable for the war between Vasily II of Moscow and his cousin Dmitry Shemyaka, which left northern Russia deserted. Shemyaka took Veliky Ustyug in 1450, drowned in the Sukhona those citizens who refused to accept him as a prince, and made the town his residence for two years, until he was driven off by the forces of Vasily. In the 15th century, the town had a great military importance and became the base for the operations against the Finno-Ugric peoples.

In 1613, during the Time of Troubles, Veliky Ustyug was besieged by Polish troops but never taken. At the junction of important trade routes, the town turned into a significant commercial and industrial center in the 16th and 17th centuries. Veliky Ustyug area was the birthplace of the explorers Semyon Dezhnyov, Yerofey Khabarov, Vladimir Atlasov, and of St. Stephen of Perm. Veliky Ustyug lost its key role as a river port with the diminishing importance of the Sukhona River route for trade between China and western Europe, which started with the foundation of Saint-Petersburg in 1703, whereby the trade was diverted to the Baltic Sea.

The 16th and 17th centuries were the time of the highest rise of the culture in Veliky Ustyug, in which it acquired a national-wide significance. The town is known for its remarkable handicrafts, such as silver filigree, birch bark fretwork, decorative copper binding, and niello. The town developed a distinct manner of icon painting — Ustyug icon painting. In the 17th century, Veliky Ustyug was a major producer of tiles, which are visible on many Ustyug churches and were sold to neighboring towns of the Russian North. On January 25, 1613, the town was unsuccessfully besieged by Polish-Lithuanian vagabonds (see Lisowczycy) led by Jakub Jacki.

In the course of the administrative reform carried out in 1708 by Peter the Great, Veliky Ustyug was explicitly mentioned as one of the 20 towns included into the Archangelgorod Governorate. From 1719, it was the center of Ustyug Province, one of the four provinces of the Governorate. In 1780, the governorate was abolished and transformed into Vologda Viceroyalty. The latter was abolished in 1796, and Veliky Ustyug became the center of Velikoustyugsky Uyezd of Vologda Governorate. In 1918, the town became the administrative center of the newly established Northern Dvina Governorate. In 1924, the uyezds were abolished in favor of the new divisions, the districts (raions).

In 1929, Northern Dvina Governorate was merged into Northern Krai. The krai consisted of five okrugs, one of which, Northern Dvina Okrug, had its administrative center in Veliky Ustyug. In July 1930, the okrugs were abolished, and the districts were directly subordinated to Northern Krai. In 1936, Northern Krai was transformed into Northern Oblast, and in 1937, Northern Oblast was split into Arkhangelsk Oblast and Vologda Oblast. Veliky Ustyug remained in Vologda Oblast ever since.

Veliky Ustyug, in contrast to the majority of historical Russian towns, managed to preserve almost all of its architectural and cultural monuments. This was in a great part due to the efforts of the local intellectuals grouped around the Regional Museum, and most notably of Nikolay Bekryashev, the museum director from 1924 to 1938. This group managed to convince the authorities that the churches and old buildings have a historical significance and must be handed in the museum rather than demolished.

In 2004, at its own expense, the Stefanovo church erected a commemorative cross where the executions had taken place from 1918 to 1939 in the ravine behind its cemetery.

== Administrative and municipal status ==
Within the framework of administrative divisions, Veliky Ustyug serves as the administrative center of Velikoustyugsky District, even though it is not a part of it. As an administrative division, it is, together with the town of Krasavino and the work settlement of Kuzino, incorporated separately as the town of oblast significance of Veliky Ustyug—one of the four administrative units in the oblast with the status equal to that of the districts. Within the framework of municipal divisions, the town of Veliky Ustyug, together with the village of Slobodka in Yudinsky Selsoviet of Velikoustyugsky District is incorporated as Veliky Ustyug Urban Settlement within Velikoustyugsky Municipal District. The town of Krasavino, together with six rural localities in Krasavinsky Selsoviet of Velikoustyugsky District, is incorporated as Krasavino Urban Settlement, and the work settlement of Kuzino is incorporated as Kuzino Urban Settlement; both also within Velikoustyugsky Municipal District.

== Climate ==
Veliky Ustyug has a borderline humid continental climate/subarctic climate (Köppen climate classification Dfb/Dfc), with warm summers and very cold winters.

Climate data for Veliky Ustyug
Month	Jan	Feb	Mar	Apr	May	Jun	Jul	Aug	Sep	Oct	Nov	Dec	Year
Record high °C (°F)	8.1 (46.6)	4.0 (39.2)	13.2 (55.8)	27.0 (80.6)	31.4 (88.5)	34.2 (93.6)	34.9 (94.8)	34.8 (94.6)	28.6 (83.5)	21.5 (70.7)	10.4 (50.7)	8.0 (46.4)	34.9 (94.8)
Mean daily maximum °C (°F)	−10.5 (13.1)	−8.4 (16.9)	−0.6 (30.9)	7.6 (45.7)	15.6 (60.1)	20.7 (69.3)	23.3 (73.9)	19.7 (67.5)	12.9 (55.2)	4.6 (40.3)	−2.9 (26.8)	−7.6 (18.3)	6.2 (43.2)
Daily mean °C (°F)	−14.1 (6.6)	−12.2 (10.0)	−4.8 (23.4)	2.8 (37.0)	9.9 (49.8)	15.1 (59.2)	17.9 (64.2)	14.8 (58.6)	9.0 (48.2)	2.1 (35.8)	−5.3 (22.5)	−10.6 (12.9)	2.1 (35.7)
Mean daily minimum °C (°F)	−17.6 (0.3)	−16.0 (3.2)	−9.0 (15.8)	−2.1 (28.2)	4.2 (39.6)	9.6 (49.3)	12.4 (54.3)	9.8 (49.6)	5.2 (41.4)	−0.4 (31.3)	−7.7 (18.1)	−13.6 (7.5)	−2.1 (28.2)
Record low °C (°F)	−44.8 (−48.6)	−42.9 (−45.2)	−36.3 (−33.3)	−23.6 (−10.5)	−9.6 (14.7)	−3.9 (25.0)	1.9 (35.4)	−1.2 (29.8)	−7.9 (17.8)	−19.2 (−2.6)	−35.5 (−31.9)	−46.3 (−51.3)	−46.3 (−51.3)
Average precipitation mm (inches)	35.5 (1.40)	26.8 (1.06)	28.1 (1.11)	32.6 (1.28)	43.2 (1.70)	58.4 (2.30)	61.8 (2.43)	59.4 (2.34)	52.6 (2.07)	53.2 (2.09)	44.6 (1.76)	41.0 (1.61)	537.2 (21.15)
Source: climatebase.ru

== Economy ==
=== Industry ===
There are timber industry enterprises in Veliky Ustyug, as well as a shipyard, food industry, and enterprises serving the tourist industry — in particular, the jewelry production plant.

Tourism is an important branch of economy in Veliky Ustyug. It started in the 1960s and got a further boost in 1990s when Veliky Ustyug started to be marketed as the residence of Ded Moroz, also known as "Grandfather Frost".

=== Transportation ===
Roads connect Veliky Ustyug with other towns. The road to the north runs to Krasavino and further to Kotlas. The one to the south runs to Nikolsk and further to Manturovo, where it connects to the road to Kostroma. The road to the southwest connects Veliky Ustyug with Vologda via Totma. It was built in the beginning of the 21st century; before this road was opened, the only way to get from Veliky Ustyug to Vologda was via Nikolsk and Totma. All these roads are paved.

An unpaved road, originating from Kuzino (which is connected with Veliky Ustyug by a ferry crossing) runs to Luza and continues to Lalsk and further to the Komi Republic.

The railroad connects Veliky Ustyug with Yadrikha railway station on the railroad connecting Konosha and Kotlas. The passenger service to Veliky Ustyug was discontinued in 2005.

The Sukhona, the Yug, and the Northern Dvina are all navigable in Veliky Ustyug, but there is no passenger navigation except for ferry crossings.

Veliky Ustyug is served by the Veliky Ustyug Airport with occasional passenger service to Vologda.

== Demographics ==
Veliky Ustyug population
- 2010 Census: 31,665
- 2002 Census: 33,419
- 1989 Census: 36,202
- 1979 Census: 37,916

The population of Veliky Ustyug was steadily growing until the second half of 20th century, but in the recent years it has been on decline, as is the general trend in Russia.

== Main sights ==
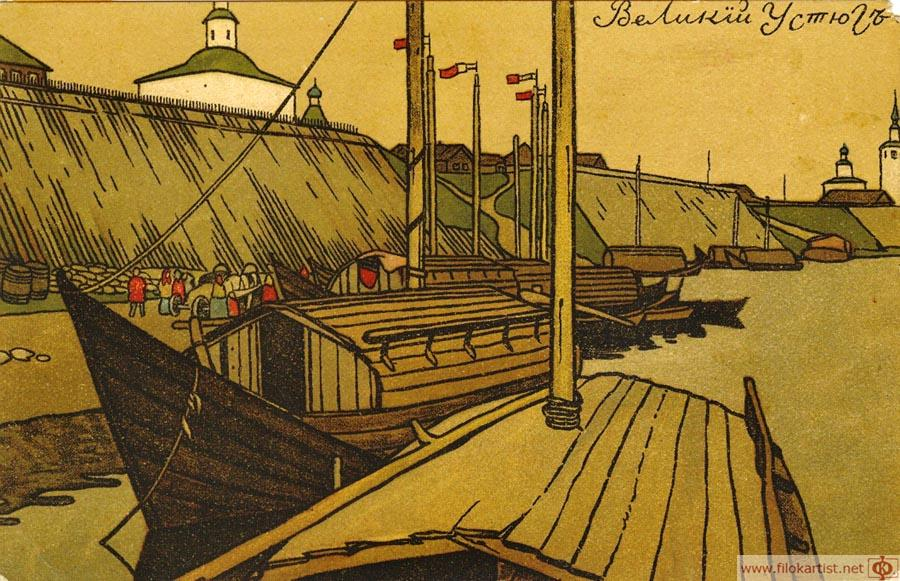
Veliky Ustyug by Ivan Bilibin, around 1900

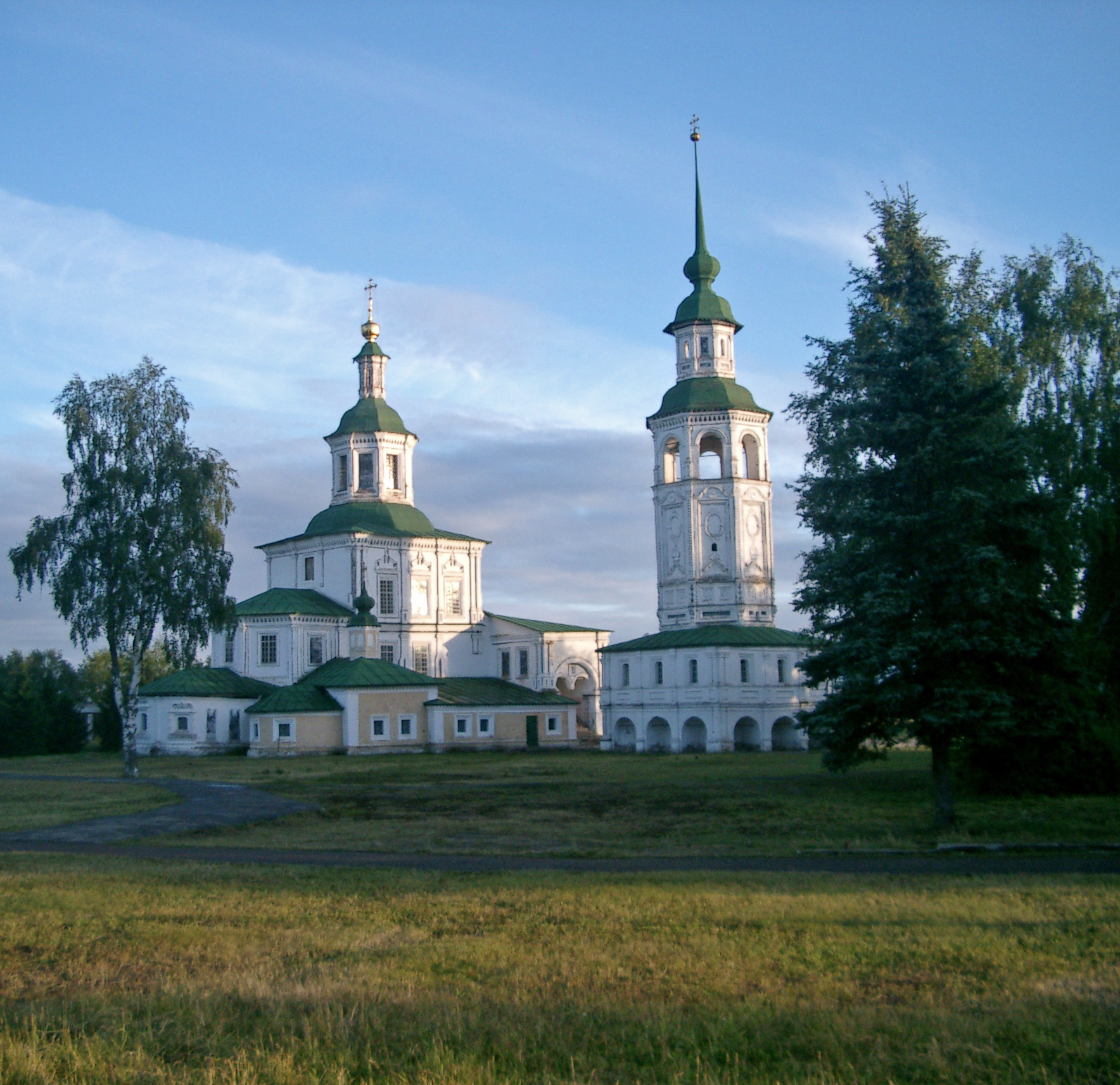
St. Nicholas Church and the bell-tower

Veliky Ustyug preserves much of its architectural heritage and has one of the best preserved architectural ensembles in Russia. The town contains 152 objects classified as cultural and historical heritage by the Russian Federal law and 25 objects classified as cultural and historical heritage of local importance. It is classified as a historical town by the Ministry of Culture of Russian Federation, which implies certain restrictions on construction in the historical center.

Most of the architectural monuments are on the left bank of the Sukhona, and many of these are the living houses. The exceptions are Troitsko-Gledensky Monastery and the Dymkovo Sloboda, on the right bank of the Sukhona. Troitsko-Gledensky Monastery is in the village of Morozovitsa, in Velikoustyugsky District.

The principal architectural ensembles of Veliky Ustyg are

- The old Sobornoye Dvorishche (Cathedral Square), with the ensemble of Assumption Cathedral (1619–1659), the St. Prokopius Cathedral (1668, Prokopius is the local saint who lived in Ustyug), the Cathedral of St. John the Righteous (1656–1663), and the Epiphany Church (1689)
- Mikhaylo-Arkhangelsky Monastery with the Cathedral of Archangel Michael (1653–1656), the Presentation Church (1653), the Gate Church of St. Vladimir (1682), and the Church of Mid-Pentecost (1710), the wall with towers and the cells
- Former transfiguration monastery: The Transfiguration Church, the Presentation Church (1725–1739), and the St. George Church (1696–1704)
- The St. Nicholas Church with the bell-tower (17th century)
- The Ascension Church (1648)
- The Church of Women Bearing Myrrh (1714–1722)
- The Church of St. Simeon the Stylite (18th century)

The monuments of civil architecture are mostly concentrated along the Sukkhona, along Sovetsky Avenue and Krasnaya Street.

Some of these buildings belong to the Velikoustyugsky Museum of History, Art, and Architecture. The museum was open in 1909 in the premises of Mikhaylo-Arkhangelsky Monastery. In 1918 it was transformed into the Museum of the Northern Dvina Culture. Between 1924 and 1938 the museum director was Nikolay Bekryashev, an artist, who devoted his energy to extending the museum to the old buildings, mostly churches, of the town, which thus were saved from destruction. In particular, a big collection of icons and objects of applied arts survived. Despite the efforts of Bekryashev and other museum employees, some of the buildings were destroyed by the authorities. The museum currently serves as an umbrella institution that organizes permanent and temporary exhibits in the former church buildings.

== Culture ==
=== Ded Moroz ===
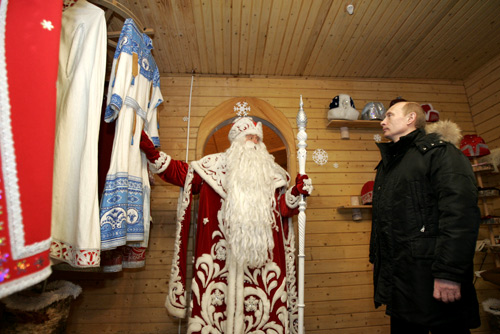
Vladimir Putin, President of the Russian Federation, visiting Ded Moroz's residence in Veliky Ustyug on January 7, 2008

In 1998, then Moscow Mayor Yury Luzhkov proposed to officially locate the residence of Ded Moroz aka "Grandfather Frost", a legendary figure similar to Saint Nicholas, Father Christmas or Santa Claus who has his roots in Slavic pagan mythology, in Veliky Ustyug.

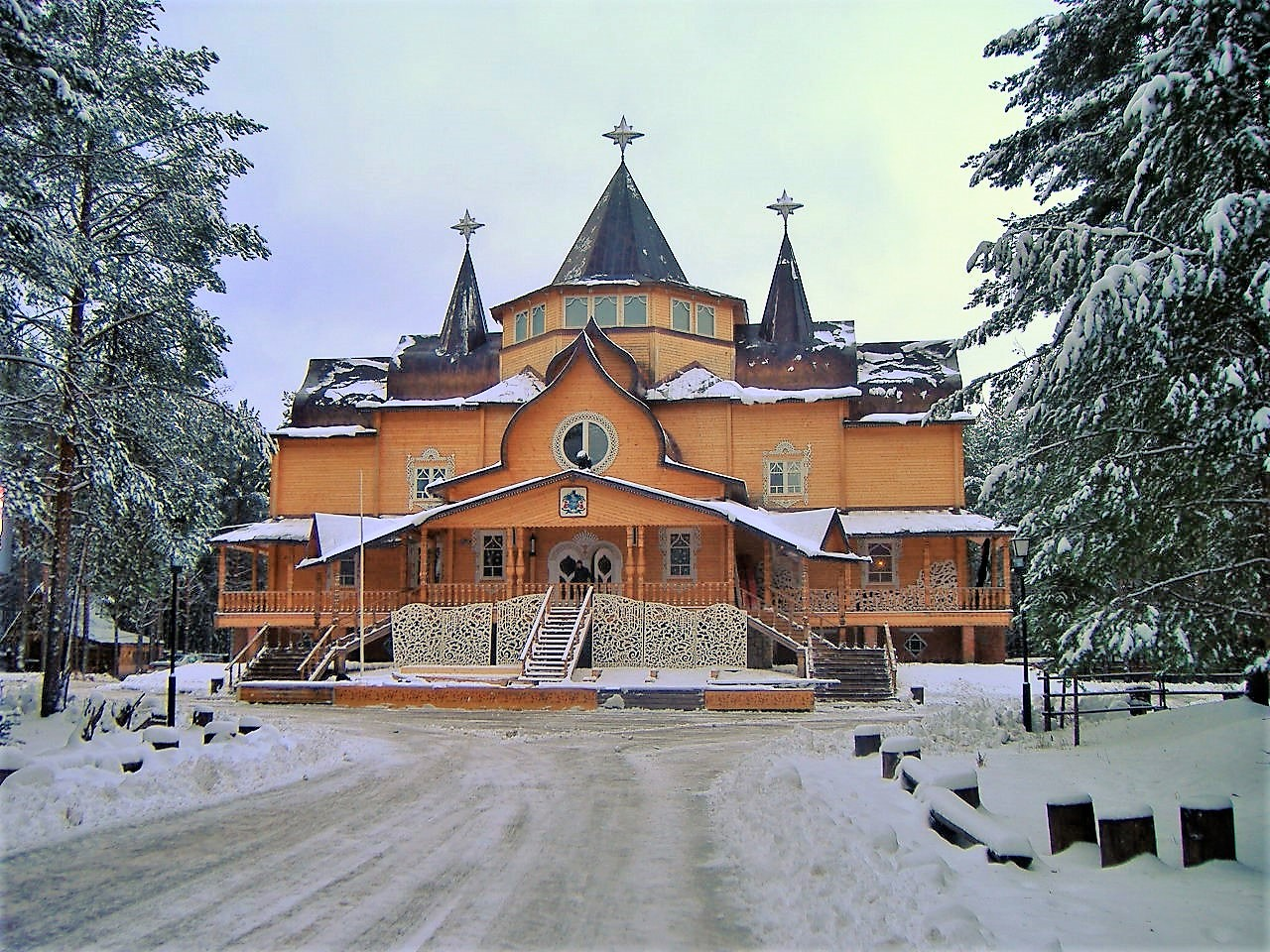
Main building of the Ded Moroz residence

The residence, which is a resort promoted as the Votchina ("estate") of Ded Moroz, is a major tourist attraction.

It is 16 km from the town, on the premises of Velikoustyugsky District. There is a dedicated post office there that answers children's mail to Ded Moroz.

== See also ==
- Ustyug Annunciation
