= Kuzino =

Kuzino Кузино
- Urban-type settlement
- Interactive map of Kuzino
- Location of Kuzino Kuzino (Vologda Oblast)
- Coordinates: 60°43′53″N 46°22′31″E
- Country: Russia
- Federal subject: Vologda Oblast
- Administrative district: Veliky Ustyug Town of Oblast Significance
- Urban-type settlement status since: 1938

Population (2010 Census)
  - Total: 1,131
  - Estimate (2023): 801 (−29.2%)

Municipal status
  - Municipal district: Velikoustyugsky Municipal District
  - Urban settlement: Kuzino Urban Settlement
  - Capital of: Kuzino Urban Settlement
- Time zone: UTC+3 (MSK)
- Postal code: 162345
- OKTMO ID: 19614110051

Kuzino (Russian: Кузино) is an urban locality (an urban-type settlement) under the administrative jurisdiction of the town of oblast significance of Veliky Ustyug, Vologda Oblast, Russia, located on the right bank of the Northern Dvina River at the confluence of the Sukhona and the Yug Rivers, opposite to Veliky Ustyug. Municipally, it is incorporated as Kuzino Urban Settlement, one of the three urban settlements in Velikoustyugsky Municipal District. Population: 1,131 (2010 census); 1,451 (2002 census); 2,042 (1989 Soviet census).

== History ==
In 1920s, Kuzino was part of Shemogodsky Selsoviet of Velikoustyugsky District of Northern Dvina Governorate. In 1930s, it grew up due to the construction of the mechanical works, and the nearby village of Yesiplevo was merged into Kuzino. In 1938, Kuzino was granted the status of an urban-type settlement.

== Economy ==
=== Industry ===
In the past, the main industrial enterprise in Kuzino was the mechanical works which went bankrupt and stopped operation in 2000s. Currently, the survived buildings of the works are used as a shipyard (boat repair) and for timber production. Most of the population are employed in Veliky Ustyug and commute there daily.

=== Transportation ===
Kuzino is connected by a passenger ferry with Veliky Ustyug. In winter, the rivers freeze, and cars and trucks cross the Northern Dvina over the ice. In spring and autumn, when the ice melts or sets up, there is no crossing to Veliky Ustyug. The Sukhona, the Yug, and the Northern Dvina are all navigable, but there is no passenger navigation except for the ferry crossings.

An unpaved road connects Kuzino with Luza in Kirov Oblast and continues to Lalsk and further to the Komi Republic.
