= Luza (inhabited locality) =

Luza (Russian: Луза) is the name of several inhabited localities in Russia.

Urban localities

- Luza, Luzsky District, Kirov Oblast, a town in Luzsky District of Kirov Oblast; 60°39′N 47°17′E

Rural localities

- Luza, Slobodskoy District, Kirov Oblast, a village in Leninsky Rural Okrug of Slobodskoy District in Kirov Oblast; 58°39′N 49°56′E
- Luza, Zuyevsky District, Kirov Oblast, a village in Sezenevsky Rural Okrug of Zuyevsky District in Kirov Oblast; 58°28′N 51°7′E
- Luza, Udmurt Republic, a village in Yelovsky Selsoviet of Yarsky District in the Udmurt Republic
- Luza, Vologda Oblast, a village in Viktorovsky Selsoviet of Velikoustyugsky District in Vologda Oblast
