= Krasavino, Veliky Ustyug, Vologda Oblast =

Town in Vologda Oblast, Russia

Krasavino Красавино
- Town
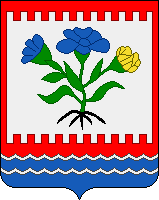
- Coat of arms
- Interactive map of Krasavino
- Location of Krasavino Krasavino (Vologda Oblast)
- Coordinates: 60°58′N 46°28′E
- Country: Russia
- Federal subject: Vologda Oblast
- Town of district significanceSelsoviet: Krasavino
- Town status since: 1947
- Elevation: 65 m (213 ft)

Population (2010 Census)
  - Total: 7,003
  - Estimate (2023): 5,460 (−22%)

Administrative status
  - Subordinated to: town of oblast significance of Veliky Ustyug
  - Capital of: town of district significance of Krasavino

Municipal status
  - Municipal district: Velikoustyugsky Municipal District
  - Urban settlement: Krasavino Urban Settlement
  - Capital of: Krasavino Urban Settlement
- Time zone: UTC+3 (MSK)
- Postal code: 162341
- Dialing code: +7 81738
- OKTMO ID: 19614105001
- Website: www.krasavino.16mb.com

Krasavino (Russian: Краса́вино) is a town under the administrative jurisdiction of the town of oblast significance of Veliky Ustyug in Vologda Oblast, Russia, located on the left bank of the Northern Dvina River, 648 kilometers (403 mi) northeast of Vologda, the administrative center of the oblast, and 25 kilometers (16 mi) north of Veliky Ustyug proper. Population: 7,003 (2010 census); 8,211 (2002 census); 9,535 (1989 Soviet census).

== History ==
The town is home to one of the oldest flax-processing factory in Russia, established in 1848 by Pyotr Lyurs, when Krasavino was still a selo. Lyurs was not able to get enough profit from the linum production and sold the factory to Yakov Gribanov. Under Gribanov, Krasavino played a prominent role as a major producer of textile (known sometimes as Gribanov textile).

In 1899–1914, a number of carcasses of huge reptiles from the Permian period were found in the outskirts of Krasavino. Krasavino was granted work settlement status in 1927 and town status in 1947.

== Administrative and municipal status ==
Within the framework of administrative divisions, the town of Krasavino, together with the work settlement of Kuzino, is subordinated to the town of oblast significance of Veliky Ustyug. As an administrative division, it is also considered to be incorporated within Velikoustyugsky District as the town of district significance of Krasavino. As a municipal division, the town of Krasavino, together with six rural localities in Krasavinsky Selsoviet of Velikoustyugsky District, is incorporated within Velikoustyugsky Municipal District as Krasavino Urban Settlement.

== Economy ==
=== Industry ===
The basis of the economy of Krasavino are the saw mill, the flax-processing factory, and the brickstone production factory.

=== Transportation ===
Krasavino is located on the road connecting Veliky Ustyug with Kotlas. There is a station on the railway connecting Veliky Ustyug with Yadrikha railway station on the railway connecting Konosha and Kotlas. The passenger service between Yadrikha and Veliky Ustyug was discontinued in 2005.

The Northern Dvina is navigable in Krasavino but there is no passenger navigation.
