= Medvedevsky =

Medvedevsky (masculine), Medvedevskaya (feminine), or Medvedevskoye (neuter) may refer to:

- Medvedevsky District, a district of the Mari El Republic, Russia
- Medvedevsky (rural locality), a rural locality (a settlement) in Samara Oblast, Russia
- Medvedevskaya, Lalsk, Kirov Oblast, a rural locality (a village) under the administrative jurisdiction of the urban-type settlement of Lalsk, Kirov Oblast, Russia
- Medvedevskaya, Shabalinsky District, Kirov Oblast, a rural locality (a village) in Shabalinsky District of Kirov Oblast, Russia
