= Demidovsky =

Demidovsky (masculine), Demidovskaya (feminine), or Demidovskoye (neuter) may refer to:

- Demidovsky District, a district of Smolensk Oblast, Russia
- Demydivka Raion (Demidovsky District), a district of Rivne Oblast, Ukraine
- Demidovskoye Urban Settlement, an administrative division and a municipal formation which the town of Demidov and four rural localities in Demidovsky District of Smolensk Oblast, Russia are incorporated as
- Demidovsky (rural locality) (Demidovskaya, Demidovskoye), several rural localities in Russia
