= Luzsky =

Luzsky (masculine), Luzskaya (feminine), or Luzskoye (neuter) may refer to:

- Luzsky District, a district of Kirov Oblast, Russia
- Luzskoye Urban Settlement, a municipal formation which the Town of Luza in Luzsky District of Kirov Oblast, Russia is incorporated as
