= Troitse-Gledensky Monastery =

Coordinates: 60°43′07″N 46°18′35″E

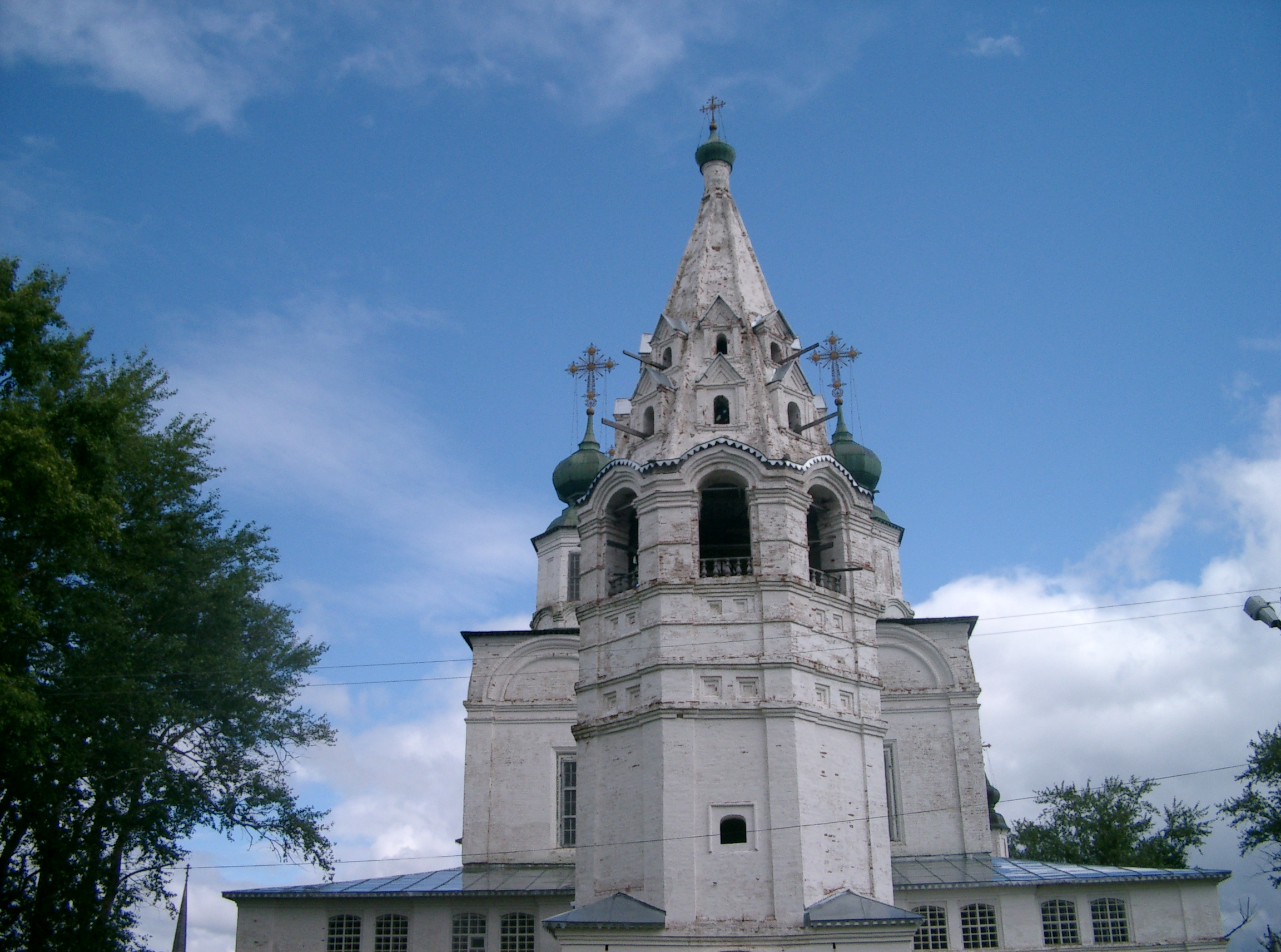
- The Trinity Cathedral (background) and the bell-tower (foreground)
- Interactive map of Troitse-Gledensky Monastery

Monastery information
- Full name: Троице-Гледенский монастырь
- Order: Russian Orthodox Church
- Established: 1492, 1912
- Disestablished: 1841, 1925
- Dedication: Divine Trinity
- Diocese: Vologda Eparchy

Site
- Location: Morozovitsa, Vologda Oblast, Russia
- Public access: Yes

Troitse-Gledensky Monastery (Russian: Троице-Гледенский монастырь) is a former Russian Orthodox monastery founded in the 12th century. The monastery is located in the village of Morozovitsa of Velikoustyugsky District in the north-east of Vologda Oblast, at the confluence of the Sukhona and the Yug Rivers, close to the town of Veliky Ustyug. The monastery ensemble currently belongs to Velikoustyugsky Museum of History, Art, and Architecture.

== History ==
The monastery is located at the place where previously a fortress of Gleden was built in the end of the 12th century by Vsevolod the Big Nest, the Grand Prince of Vladimir. Gleden was the predecessor of Veliky Ustyug and was destroyed in the 15th century during wars between Russian princes. The early history of the monastery is not well documented, however, it is assumed that the monastery was founded at the same time as the fortress, but survived the civil war of the 15th century. Troitse-Gledensky monastery was first mentioned in 1492. By 1725, the monastery has 24 monks and 176 priests and deacons. By the same year, it owned 60 villages with the total population of about 1000.

In the beginning of the 19th century, the monastery lost any significance, and there were two to four monks living there. The monastery was abolished in 1841, re-established in 1912 as a female monastery and in 1918 transformed into an agricultural commune. The commune was a compromise between the authorities, trying to eradicate any religious movements, and the nuns, who wished to preserve the same way of living they had in the monastery. In 1925, the commune was abolished, since it was judged by the authorities to display too much of the religious fever. The monastery was eventually used as a junior correction establishment, as a center for force resettlement, and as a retirement home. In the 1980s, the former monastery buildings were transferred to the Veliky Ustyug Museum.

== Architecture ==
The architectural ensemble of the monastery originates from 17th and 18th centuries. This is the time when in and around Veliky Ustyug the stone building, churches in the first instance, started to replace the wooden buildings. Almost all the buildings of the monastery preserve the original exterior and interior.

The main church of the monastery is the Trinity Cathedral build as a cube and containing five domes. The Trinity cathedral was the first stone building of the monastery. The construction was initiated by Rostov Metropolitan Iona Sysoyevich, and the cathedral was consecrated in 1707. Mikhaylo-Arkhangelsky Monastery in Veliky Ustyug was used as a prototype for the cathedral. Inside, the cathedral contains a five-row iconostasis carved between 1776 and 1784 by local artists, brothers Nikolay Bogdanov and Timofey Bogdanov. The icons were also painted locally. Next to the cathedral, there is a tented roof bell-tower, built simultaneously with the cathedral.

Another church in the monastery is the Church of the Tikhvin Icon of the Virgin (1729–1740). There is also a wall (1770s) with towers and gates. One of the gates is the Assumption Church.
