= Nikolay Bekryashev =

Russian painter

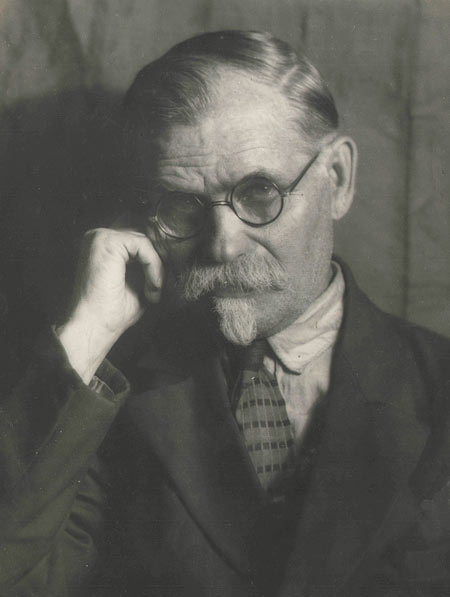
- Born: Nikolay Yegorovich Bekryashev; 11 April 1874; Vyropaikha, Solvychegodsky Uyezd, Vologda Governorate, Russian Empire
- Died: 6 April 1939 (aged 65); Arkhangelsk Oblast, Russian SSR, Soviet Union
- Education: Imperial Academy of Arts
- Spouses: Lyudmila Borisova (m. 1910–1932) Serafima Heytman (m. 1936)

Nikolay Georgiyevich (Yegorovich) Bekryashev (Russian: Никола́й Гео́ргиевич (Его́рович) Бе́кряшев, 1874 – 1939) was a Russian painter. He was the director of the Museum of the Northern Dvina Culture (currently the Veliky Ustyug Museum of History, Art, and Architecture) from 1924 to 1938 and is credited with the preservation of most of historical and architectural heritage of the town of Veliky Ustyug.

== Biography ==
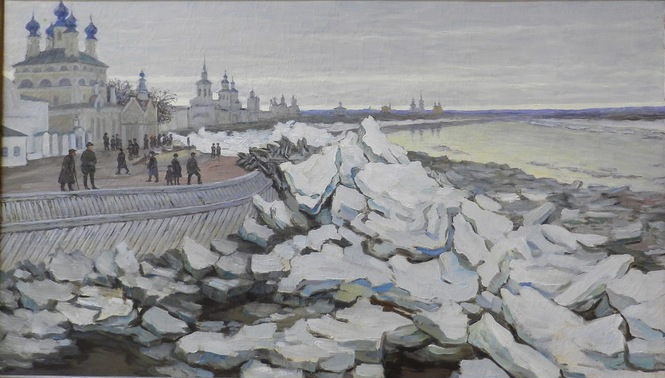
Ice Drifting in Veliky Ustyug on the Sukhona River, 1923

Nikolay Bekryashev was born on 11 April [O.S. 30 March] 1874 in the village of Vyropaikha (present-day Dolgopolovskaya) near Krasnoborsk, Vologda Governorate of the Russian Empire to Maria Nikolayevna and Yegor Nikolayevich Bekryashev. He studied in the Imperial Academy of Arts in Saint-Petersburg from 1900 to 1910. He specialized in genre painting.

In 1918, the Northern Dvina Culture was open in Veliky Ustyug. The opening event was the exhibition of painting of Aleksandr Borisov. Yevlampy Burtsev was appointed the first director of the museum. After the death of Burtsev on 20 November 1924 Bekryashev became the museum director. From 1918, Bekryashev was at the center of the circle of local intellectuals in Veliky Ustyug, whose goal was to preserve the historical heritage of the town. On the opposite side, the authorities wished to close the churches, to confiscate the church property, and eventually to demolish the buildings. Bekryashev and his colleagues found a way to compromise with the authorities, so that the church property was confiscated, but declared to be the historical and cultural heritage, transferred to the museum and preserved there.

The museum was initially located on the premises of Mikhaylo-Arkhangelsky Monastery in the center of the town. In 1921, Bekryashev managed to attract the commission from Moscow, which evaluated the Veliky Ustyg buildings and concluded on which of them represent the cultural heritage. He used the decisions of the committee against the local authorities which had no interest in keeping the buildings of former churches. In 1923, he initiated the creation of Northern Dvina Governorate Society of Regional Studies. The members of the Society, and Bekryashev in particular, personally toured the town in order to identify objects of cultural importance. As the result, Veliky Ustyug lost very little of its historical buildings and remained one of the best preserved architectural ensembles in Russia.

Nikolay Bekryashev was arrested on 20 February 1938 during the Great Purge and sentenced to three years in prison for counter-revolutionary activity. He died on 6 April 1939 while still in a labor camp, near Plesetsk of Arkhangelsk Oblast.

In 2000, he was posthumously awarded the title of an honorary citizen of Veliky Ustyug. The commemorative plaque to Nikolay Bekryashev is installed in the Veliky Ustyug Museum of History, Art, and Architecture.
