= Luza (river) =

Luza Russian: Луза
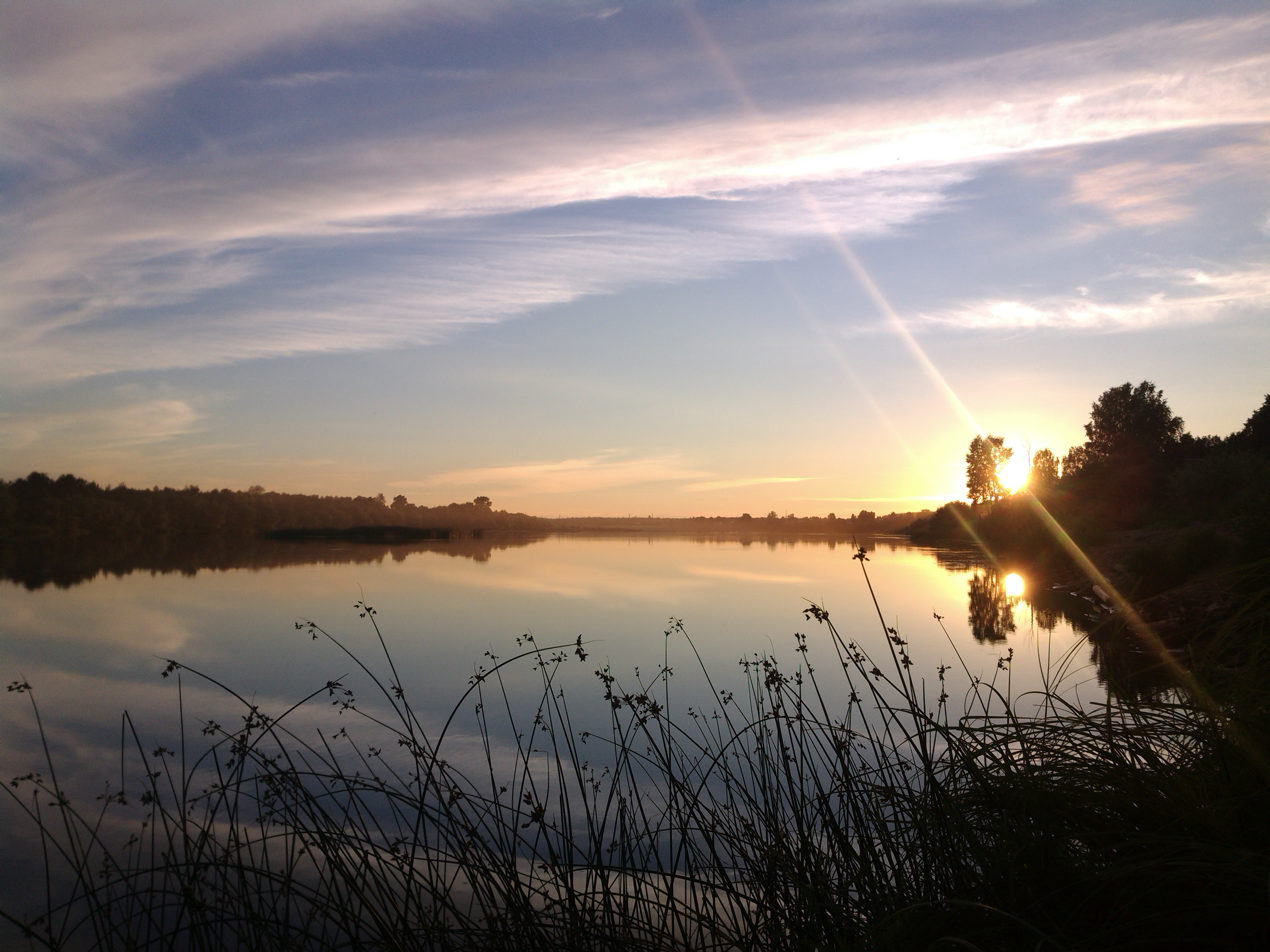

Location
- Country: Russia

Physical characteristics
- Mouth: Yug
  - coordinates: 60°34′14″N 46°27′03″E
- Length: 574 km (357 mi)
- Basin size: 18,300 km^{2} (7,100 sq mi)
- Discharge
  - average: 117 cubic metres per second (4,100 cu ft/s)

Basin features
- Progression: Yug→ Northern Dvina→ White Sea

The Northern Dvina basin. The Luza is shown on the map

The Luza (Russian: Луза) is a river in Oparinsky and Luzsky Districts of Kirov Oblast, Priluzsky District of the Komi Republic, and Velikoustyugsky District of Vologda Oblast in Russia. It is a right tributary of the Yug. It is 574 kilometers (357 mi) long, and the area of its drainage basin is 18,300 square kilometers (7,100 sq mi). Its main tributaries are the Lopyu, the Porub, the Lekhta, and the Lala (all from the right). The town of Luza and the urban-type settlement of Lalsk are located on the banks of the Luza, as well as the selo of Obyachevo, the administrative center of Priluzsky District.

The basin of the Luza comprises vast areas in the north of Kirov Oblast, southeast of the Komi Republic, north-east of Vologda Oblast, and minor areas in the southwest of Arkhangelsk Oblast. Having the source in the east of Oparinsky District of Kirov Oblast, the Luza initially flows east, enters the Komi Republic, makes a bow and returns in the western direction, crossing Kirov Oblast again and emptying to the Yug River in Vologda Oblast. Most of the course of the Luza runs through the Northern Ridge.

The Luza is navigable for more than 400 kilometers (250 mi) downstream of the selo of Noshul in the Komi Republic; however, there is no passenger navigation. Until the 1990s, it was used for timber rafting.

The Luza had a historical significance in the past as one of the waterways of the Russian North. Whereas it is not listed among the most important waterways, there were at least two portages from the Luza to the basin of the Vyatka, one to the Kobra, another one to the Moloma. These portages were local and presumably were used by local hunters and traders. Lalsk was founded by the Novgorodians looking for a remote location.
