= Yartsevo, Cherepovetsky District, Vologda Oblast =

Yartsevo Ярцево
- Village
- Location within Vologda Oblast Location within Russia
- Coordinates: 59°20′N 37°31′E
- Country: Russia
- Region: Vologda Oblast
- District: Cherepovetsky District
- Time zone: UTC+3:00

Yartsevo (Russian: Ярцево) is a rural locality (a village) in Abakanovskoye Rural Settlement, Cherepovetsky District, Vologda Oblast, Russia. The population was 12 as of 2002.

== Geography ==
Yartsevo is located 47 km northwest of Cherepovets (the district's administrative centre) by road. Nikolskoye is the nearest rural locality.
