= Yesiplevo =

Yesiplevo Есиплево
- Selo
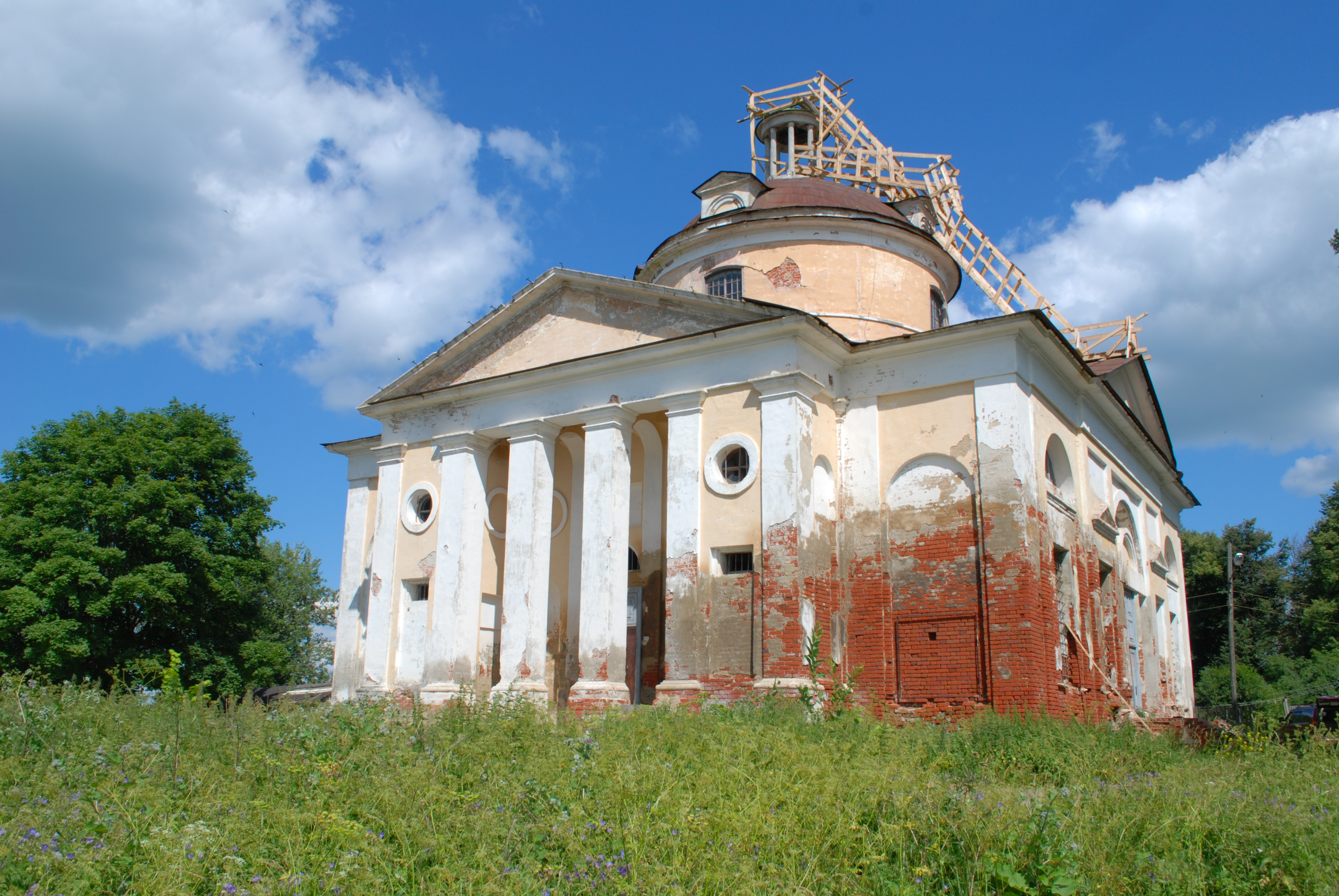
- Church of the Intercession of the Virgin Mary (Russian: Церковь Покрова Богородицы)

- Location within Vladimir Oblast Location within Russia
- Coordinates: 56°18′N 39°32′E
- Country: Russia
- Region: Vladimir Oblast
- District: Kolchuginsky District

Population (2010)
  - Total: 458
- Time zone: UTC+3:00

Yesiplevo (Russian: Есиплево) is a rural locality (a selo) and the administrative center of Yesiplevskoye Rural Settlement, Kolchuginsky District, Vladimir Oblast, Russia. The population was 458 in 2010. There are 14 streets.

== Geography ==
Yesiplevo is located on the Ilmovka River, 15 km east of Kolchugino (the district's administrative centre) by road. Sloboda is the nearest rural locality. The selo of Shkolny (Russian: Школьный, 56.312°N 39.540°E) is part of the village and had a population of four as of 2010.
