= Yartsevo, Vladimir Oblast =

Yartsevo Ярцево
- Village
- Location within Vladimir Oblast Location within Russia
- Coordinates: 55°47′N 41°33′E
- Country: Russia
- Region: Vladimir Oblast
- District: Selivanovsky District
- Time zone: UTC+3:00

Yartsevo (Russian: Ярцево) is a rural locality (a village) in Malyshevskoye Rural Settlement, Selivanovsky District, Vladimir Oblast, Russia. The population was 27 as of 2010.

== Geography ==
Yartsevo is located on the Ushna River, 19 km southwest from Krasnaya Gorbatka (the district's administrative centre) by road. Krasnaya Ushna is the nearest rural locality.
