= Morozovitsa =

Morozovitsa Морозовица
- Village
- Location within Vologda Oblast Location within Russia
- Coordinates: 60°42′N 46°17′E
- Country: Russia
- Region: Vologda Oblast
- District: Velikoustyugsky District
- Time zone: UTC+3:00

Morozovitsa (Russian: Морозовица) is a rural locality (a village) in and the administrative center of Tregubovskoye Rural Settlement, Velikoustyugsky District, Vologda Oblast, Russia. The population was 879 as of 2002. There are 20 streets.

== Geography ==
Morozovitsa is located 13 km south of Veliky Ustyug (the district's administrative centre) by road. Pestovo is the nearest rural locality.
