= Demidovsky, Republic of Bashkortostan =

Demidovsky Демидовский
- Khutor
- Location within Bashkortostan Location within Russia
- Coordinates: 55°27′N 55°42′E
- Country: Russia
- Region: Bashkortostan
- District: Birsky District
- Time zone: UTC+5:00

Demidovsky (Russian: Демидовский) is a rural locality (a khutor) in Suslovsky Selsoviet, Birsky District, Bashkortostan, Russia. The population was 10 as of 2010. There is 1 street.

== Geography ==
Demidovsky is located 15 km northeast of Birsk (the district's administrative centre) by road. Shestykovo is the nearest rural locality.
