= Demidovskaya, Tarnogsky District, Vologda Oblast =

Demidovskaya Демидовская
- Village
- Location within Vologda Oblast Location within Russia
- Coordinates: 60°30′N 43°32′E
- Country: Russia
- Region: Vologda Oblast
- District: Tarnogsky District
- Time zone: UTC+3:00

Demidovskaya (Russian: Демидовская) is a rural locality (a village) in Tarnogskoye Rural Settlement, Tarnogsky District, Vologda Oblast, Russia. The population was 53 as of 2002.

== Geography ==
Demidovskaya is located 3 km northwest of Tarnogsky Gorodok (the district's administrative centre) by road. Tarnogsky Gorodok is the nearest rural locality.
