= Lalsk =

Lalsk Лальск
- Urban-type settlement
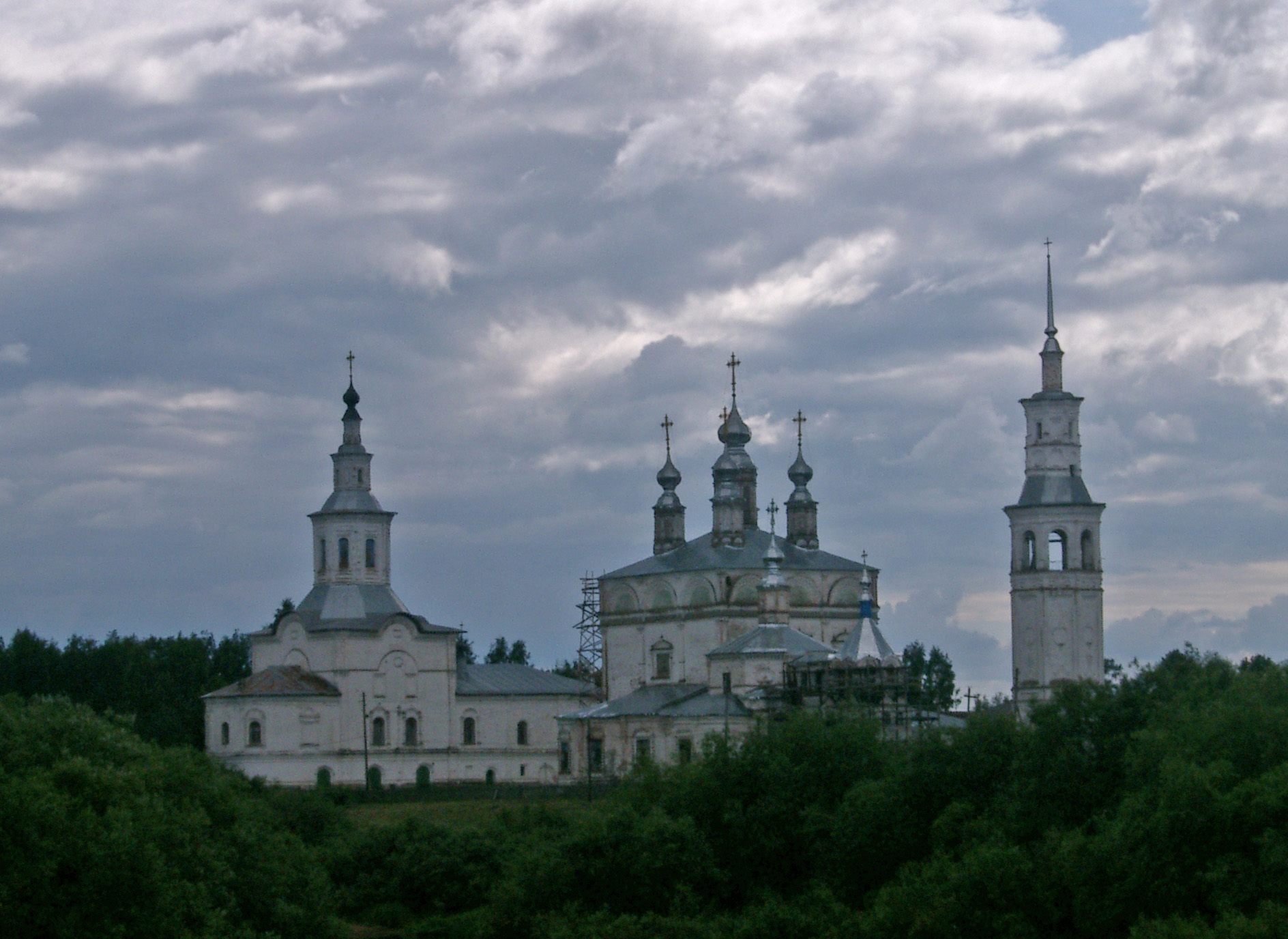
- The cathedral compound in Lalsk

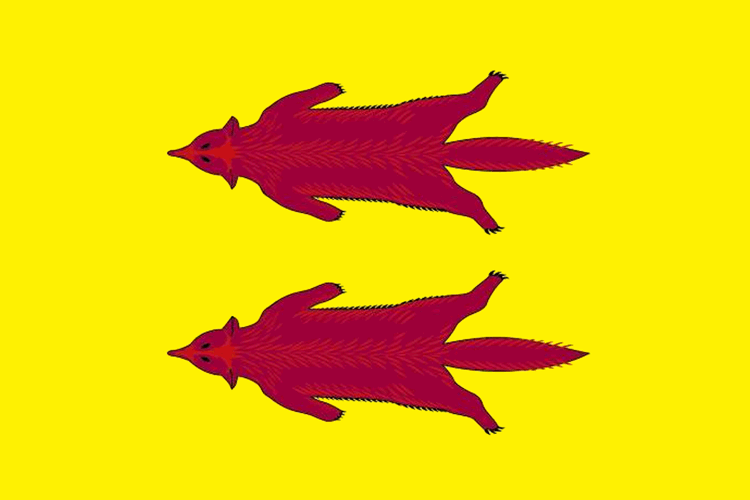
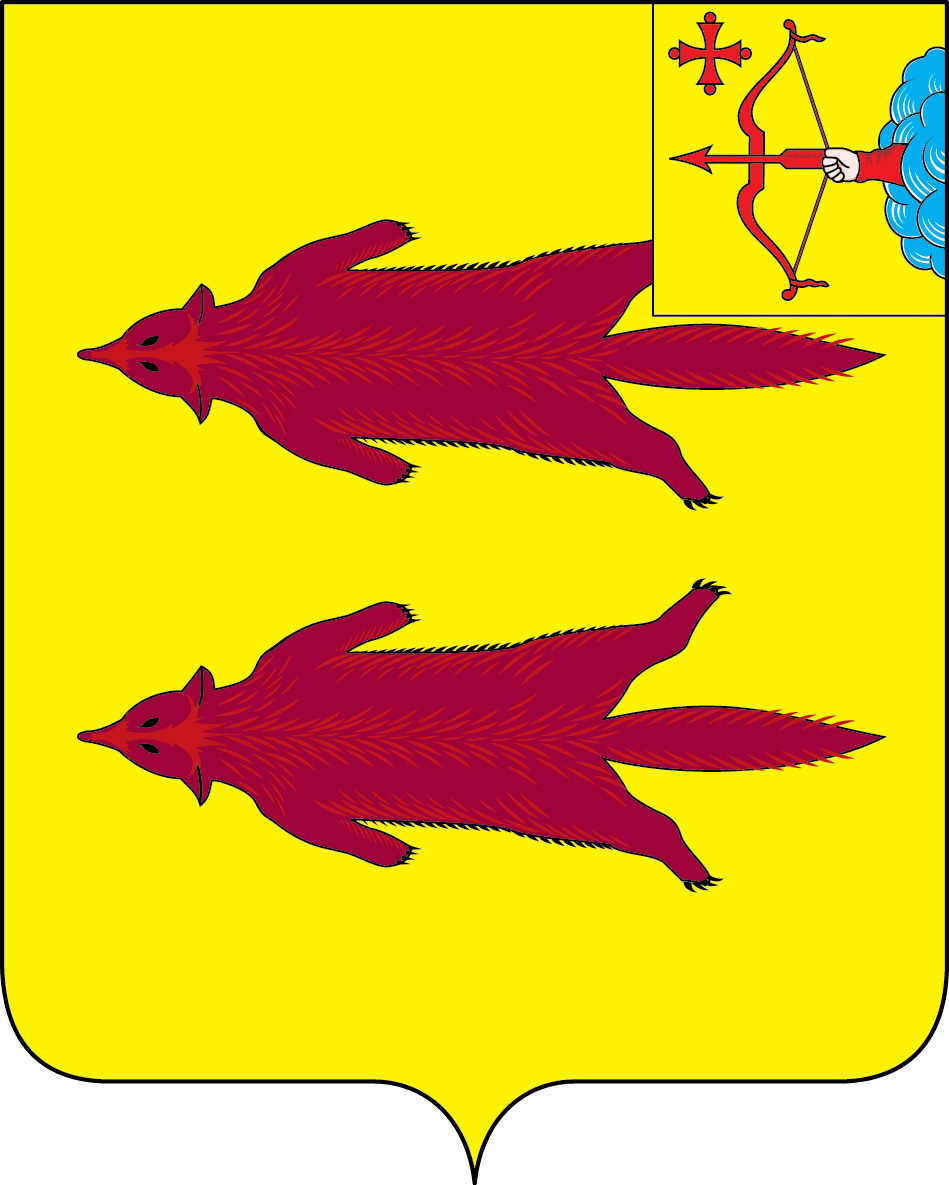
- Flag Coat of arms
- Interactive map of Lalsk
- Location of Lalsk Lalsk (Kirov Oblast)
- Coordinates: 60°44′14″N 47°35′21″E
- Country: Russia
- Federal subject: Kirov Oblast
- Administrative district: Luzsky District
- Founded: 1570 (Julian)

Population (2010 Census)
  - Total: 3,705
  - Estimate (2025): 2,204 (−40.5%)
- Time zone: UTC+3 (MSK)
- Postal code: 613970
- OKTMO ID: 33622154051

Lalsk (Russian: Лальск) is an urban locality (an urban-type settlement) in Luzsky District of Kirov Oblast, Russia, located 27 kilometers (17 mi) northeast from Luza, the administrative center of the district. Population: 3,705 (2010 census); 4,551 (2002 census); 5,471 (1989 Soviet census).

== History ==
It takes its name from the Lala River, a tributary of the Luza. The settlement was established by the Novgorodians fleeing east from Ivan the Terrible after the Massacre of Novgorod. It was a large trading outpost in the eastern part of the Russian North in the late 17th and 18th centuries. The earliest stone church was consecrated in 1711.

Lalsk had town status between 1779 and 1927 and served as the administrative center of Lalsky District between 1924 and 1963.

== Architecture ==
Lalsk is notable for a remarkable cluster of 18th-century Orthodox churches in various stages of disrepair:

- The Cathedral of Christ's Resurrection (1698–1715) with a campanile dating from 1729
- The nearby Church of the Annunciation for winter services (1732–1762)
- The partly ruined Church of the Epiphany (1711)
- The Church of St. John the Baptist (1714)
- The Church of the Savior's Transfiguration (1730–1732)
- The Church of the Virgin's Dormition (1791–1796)
