= Luzsky District =

Luzsky District Лузский район (Russian)
- District
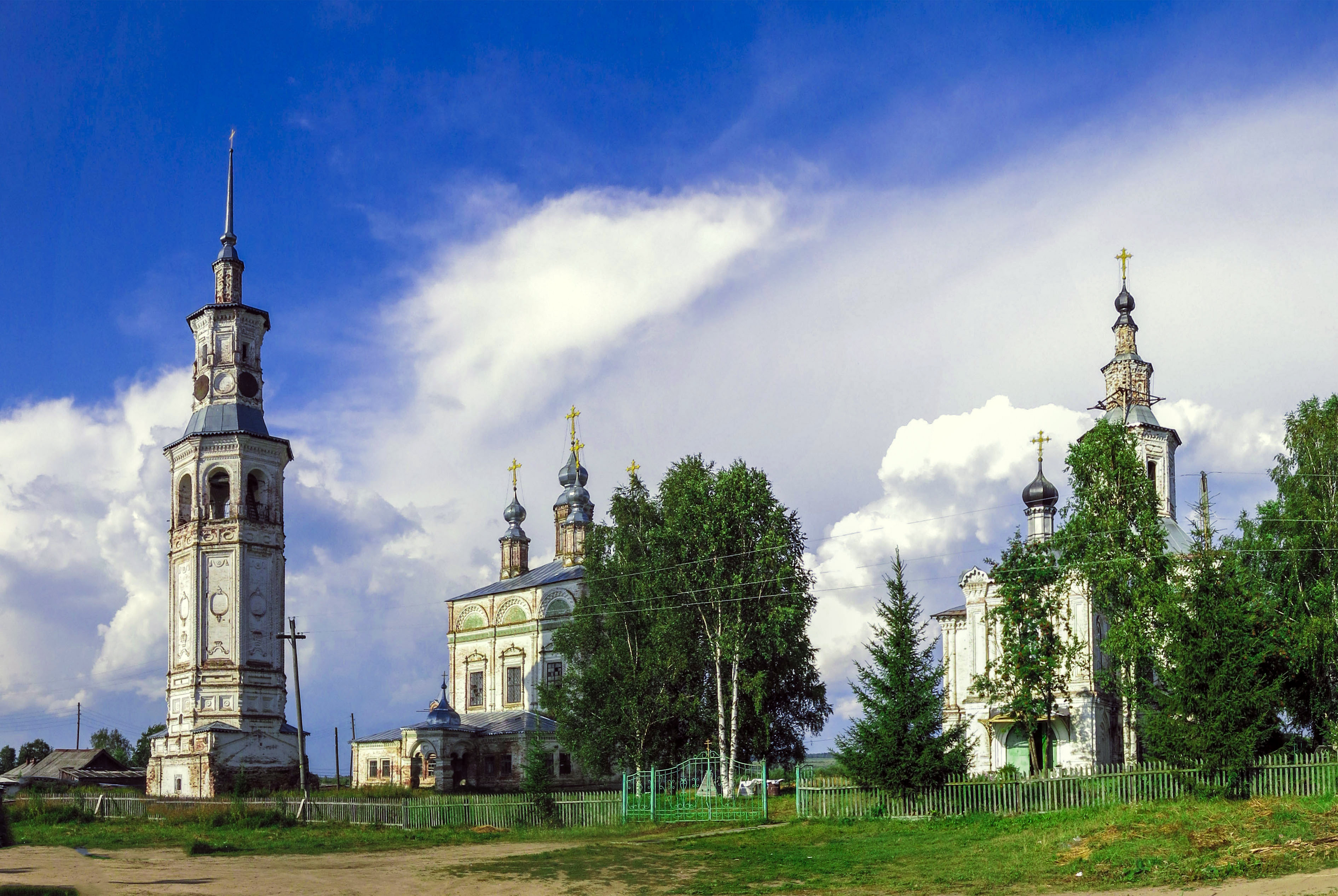
- A church complex in Lalsk, Luzsky District

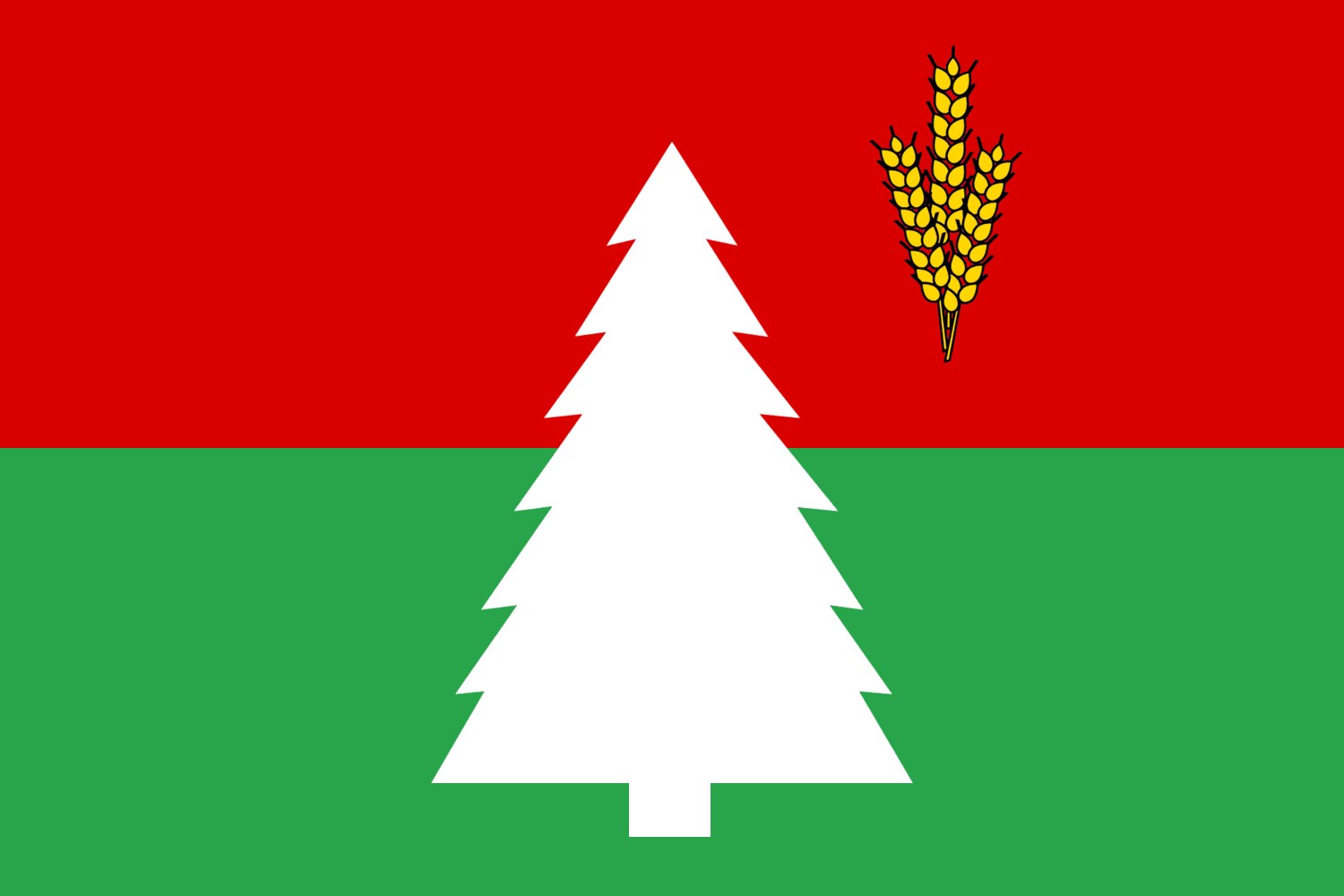
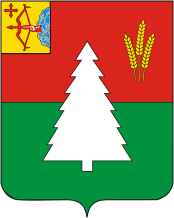
- Flag Coat of arms
- Location of Luzsky District in Kirov Oblast
- Coordinates: 60°37′N 47°17′E
- Country: Russia
- Federal subject: Kirov Oblast
- Established: 1963
- Administrative center: Luza

Area
  - Total: 5,315 km^{2} (2,052 sq mi)

Population (2010 Census)
  - Total: 18,688
  - Density: 3.516/km^{2} (9.107/sq mi)
  - Urban: 80.1%
  - Rural: 19.9%

Administrative structure
  - Administrative divisions: 1 Towns, 1 Urban-type settlements, 1 Rural okrugs
  - Inhabited localities: 1 cities/towns, 1 urban-type settlements, 137 rural localities

Municipal structure
  - Municipally incorporated as: Luzsky Municipal District
  - Municipal divisions: 2 urban settlements, 1 rural settlements
- Time zone: UTC+3 (MSK)
- OKTMO ID: 33622000
- Website: http://лузский.рф

Population of Luzsky District
- 2010 Census: 18,688
- 2002 Census: 22,599
- 1989 Census: 26,843
- 1979 Census: 29,953

Luzsky District (Russian: Лу́зский райо́н) is an administrative and municipal district (raion), one of the thirty-nine in Kirov Oblast, Russia. It is located in the northwest of the oblast. The area of the district is 5,315 square kilometers (2,052 sq mi). Its administrative center is the town of Luza. As of the 2010 Census, the total population of the district was 18,688, with the population of Luza accounting for 60.3% of that number.

== History ==
The district was established in 1963 by merging of Lalsky and Podosinovsky Districts, although Podosinovsky District was split back at a later date.
