= Luza, Luzsky District, Kirov Oblast =

Town in Kirov Oblast, Russia

Luza Луза
- Town
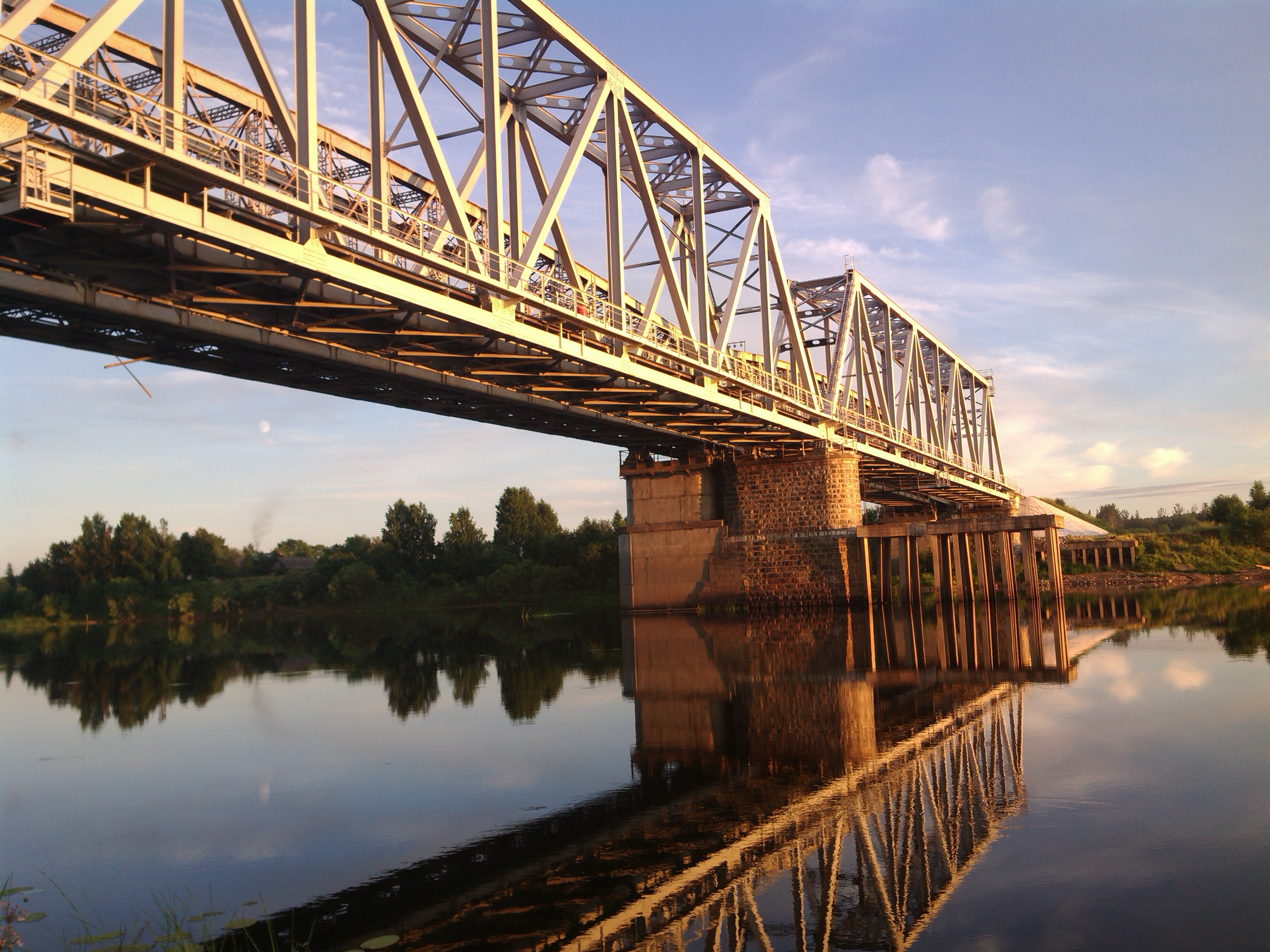

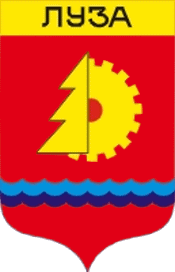
- Coat of arms
- Interactive map of Luza
- Location of Luza Luza (Kirov Oblast)
- Coordinates: 60°39′N 47°17′E
- Country: Russia
- Federal subject: Kirov Oblast
- Administrative district: Luzsky District
- TownSelsoviet: Luza
- Founded: the end of the 19th century
- Town status since: 1944
- Elevation: 95 m (312 ft)

Population (2010 Census)
  - Total: 11,260
  - Estimate (2021): 9,122 (−19%)

Administrative status
  - Capital of: Luzsky District, Town of Luza

Municipal status
  - Municipal district: Luzsky Municipal District
  - Urban settlement: Luzskoye Urban Settlement
  - Capital of: Luzsky Municipal District, Luzskoye Urban Settlement
- Time zone: UTC+3 (MSK)
- Postal codes: 613980, 613982, 613983, 613999
- OKTMO ID: 33522000001
- Website: admluza.ru

Luza (Russian: Лу́за) is a town and the administrative center of Luzsky District in Kirov Oblast, Russia, located on the Luza River (Yug's tributary), 301 kilometers (187 mi) northwest of Kirov, the administrative center of the oblast. Population: 11,260 (2010 census); 12,311 (2002 census); 13,706 (1989 Soviet census).

== Paleontology ==
Fossil of temnospondyl amphibian Luzocephalus blomi was found in the Lower Triassic (Lower Induan) deposits of Luza. There is also a report about vertebrae of Tupilakosaurus sp. from the same location.

== History ==
Luza was established as a settlement at the railway station in the end of the 19th century on location of an older settlement, which had been known since the 17th century. Town status was granted to it in 1944.

== Administrative and municipal status ==
Within the framework of administrative divisions, Luza serves as the administrative center of Luzsky District. As an administrative division, it is, together with thirty-six rural localities, incorporated within Luzsky District as the Town of Luza. As a municipal division, the Town of Luza is incorporated within Luzsky Municipal District as Luzskoye Urban Settlement.

== Economy ==
Luza is a large timber-works center. There is a sawmill and a railroad tie-manufacturing plant in the town. Luza is one of the monotowns, on 2021 the biggest employer in the city is Holz House LLC. Holz House produces prefabricated glulam houses and sell glulam and lumber all over the world.
