= Obradovo =

Obradovo (Russian: Обрадово) is the name of several rural localities in Russia:

- Obradovo, Tver Oblast, a village in Vyshnevolotsky District of Tver Oblast
- Obradovo, Vologda Oblast, a village in Orlovsky Selsoviet of Velikoustyugsky District of Vologda Oblast
