= Obradovo, Vologda Oblast =

Obradovo Обрадово
- Village
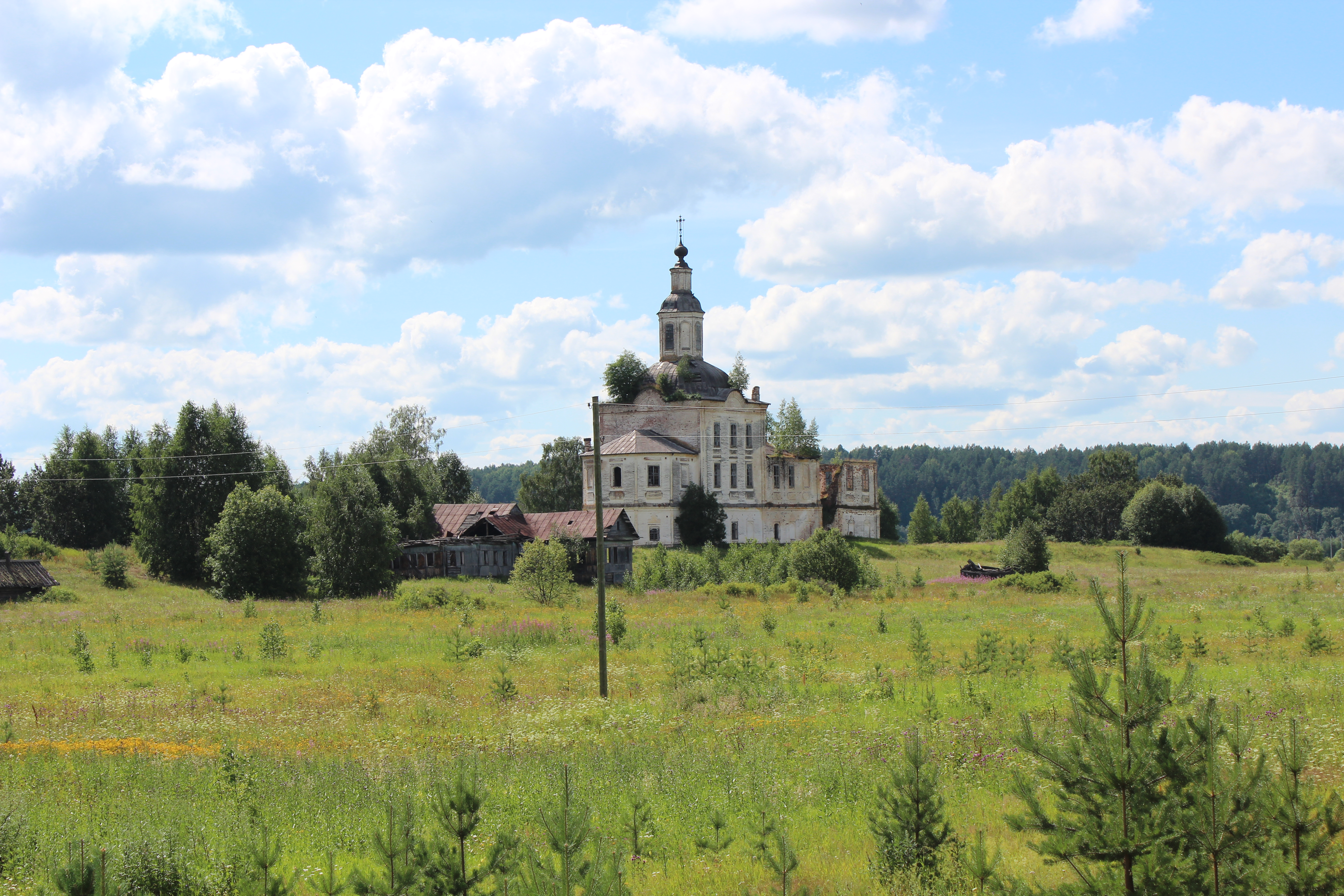
- Obradovo

- Location within Vologda Oblast Location within Russia
- Coordinates: 60°27′N 46°47′E
- Country: Russia
- Region: Vologda Oblast
- District: Velikoustyugsky District
- Time zone: UTC+3:00

Obradovo (Russian: Обрадово) is a rural locality (a village) in Orlovskoye Rural Settlement, Velikoustyugsky District, Vologda Oblast, Russia. The population was 1 as of 2002.

== Geography ==
Obradovo is located 85 km southeast of Veliky Ustyug (the district's administrative centre) by road. Vasilyevo is the nearest rural locality.
