= Studyonoye =

Studyonoye Студёное
- Village
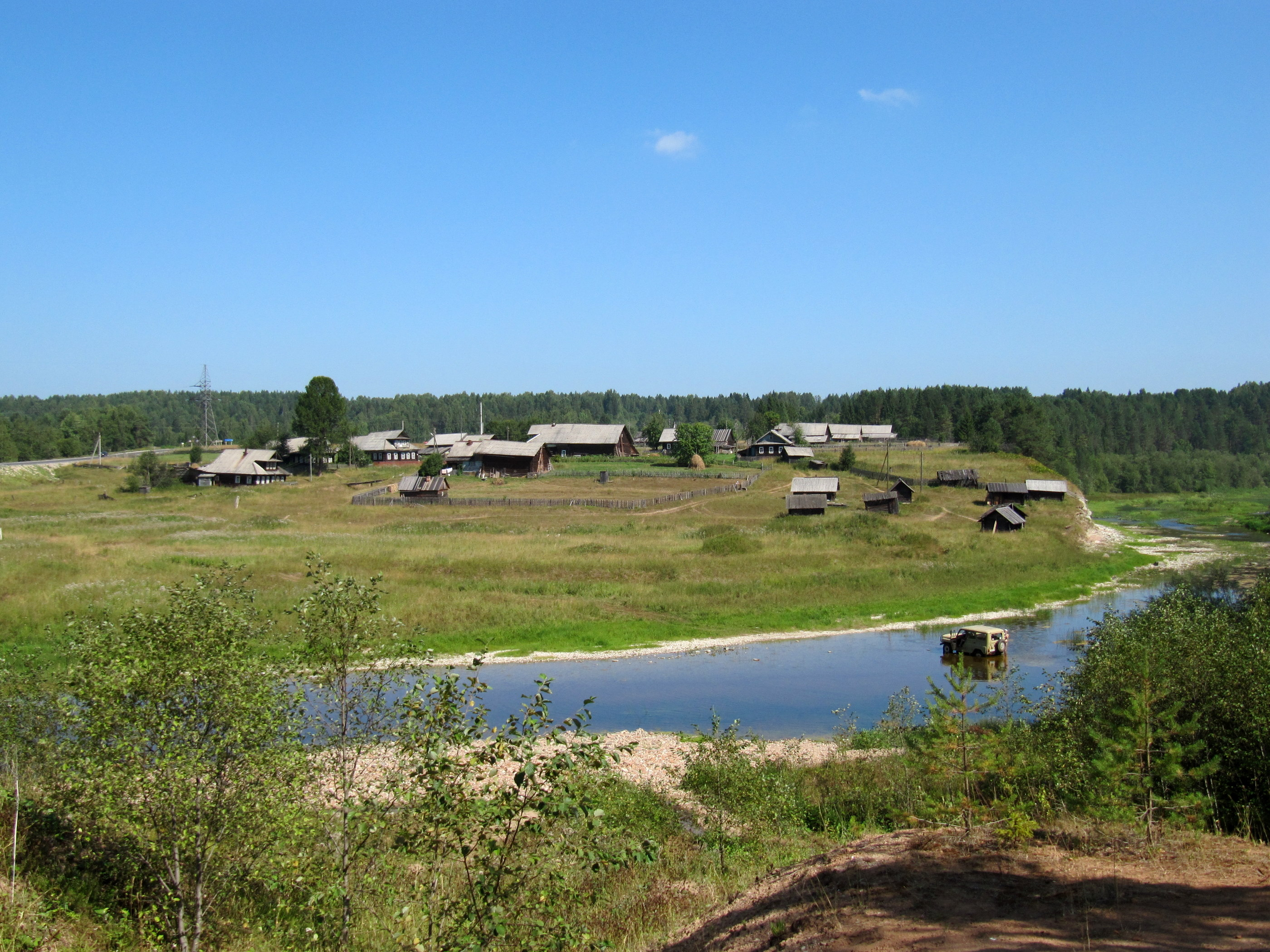

- Location within Vologda Oblast Location within Russia
- Coordinates: 60°34′N 45°32′E
- Country: Russia
- Region: Vologda Oblast
- District: Velikoustyugsky District
- Time zone: UTC+3:00

Studyonoye (Russian: Студёное) is a rural locality (a village) in Opokskoye Rural Settlement, Velikoustyugsky District, Vologda Oblast, Russia. The population was 15 as of 2002.

== Geography ==
Studyonoye is located 56 km southwest of Veliky Ustyug (the district's administrative centre) by road. Priluki is the nearest rural locality.
