= Palema =

Palema Палема
- Selo
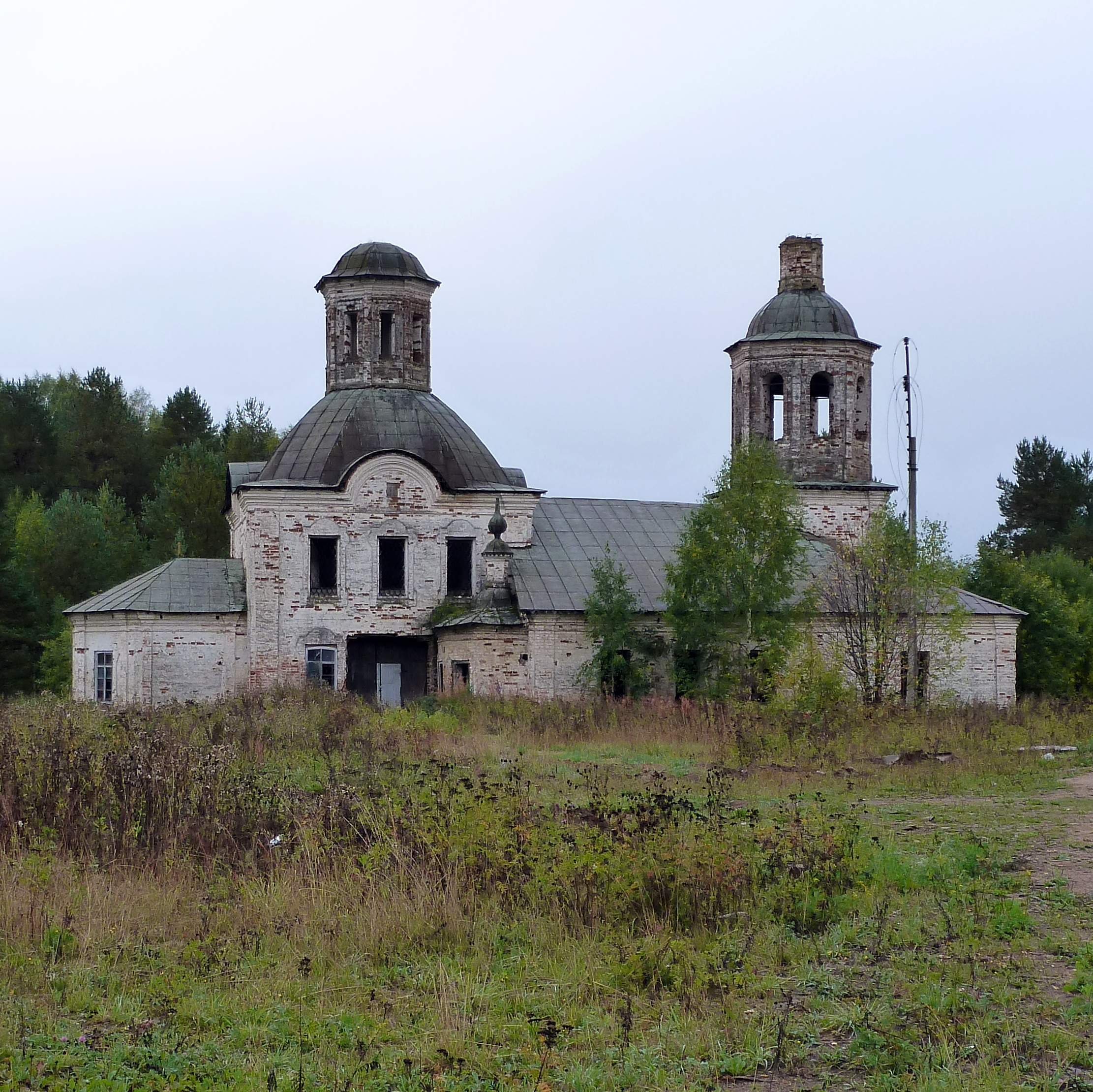

- Location within Vologda Oblast Location within Russia
- Coordinates: 60°38′N 46°52′E
- Country: Russia
- Region: Vologda Oblast
- District: Velikoustyugsky District
- Time zone: UTC+3:00

Palema (Russian: Палема) is a rural locality (a selo) in Pokrovskoye Rural Settlement, Velikoustyugsky District, Vologda Oblast, Russia. The population was 40 as of 2002.

== Geography ==
Palema is located 45 km southeast of Veliky Ustyug (the district's administrative centre) by road. Korolyovo is the nearest rural locality.
