= Ustye Povalikhino =

Ustye Povalikhino Устье-Повалихино
- Village
- Location within Vologda Oblast Location within Russia
- Coordinates: 60°38′N 46°13′E
- Country: Russia
- Region: Vologda Oblast
- District: Velikoustyugsky District
- Time zone: UTC+3:00

Ustye Povalikhino (Russian: Устье-Повалихино) is a rural locality (a village) in Tregubovskoye Rural Settlement, Velikoustyugsky District, Vologda Oblast, Russia. The population was 6 as of 2002. There are 2 streets.

== Geography ==
Ustye Povalikhino is located 22 km southwest of Veliky Ustyug (the district's administrative centre) by road. Skorodum is the nearest rural locality.

== Politics ==
Marina Udgodskaya unexpectedly won the 2020 mayor election after she ran for office only as a weak opponent against former mayor Nikolai Loktev, so he could easily be re-elected.
