= Zaozeritsa =

Zaozeritsa Заозерица
- Village
- Location within Vologda Oblast Location within Russia
- Coordinates: 60°31′N 46°28′E
- Country: Russia
- Region: Vologda Oblast
- District: Velikoustyugsky District

Population
  - Total: 41 (2,002)
- Time zone: UTC+3:00
- Postal code: 162370

Zaozeritsa (Russian: Заозерица) is a rural locality (a village) in Ust-Alexeyevskoye Rural Settlement, Velikoustyugsky District, Vologda Oblast, Russia. The population was 41 as of 2002.

== Geography ==
Zaozeritsa is located 62 km southeast of Veliky Ustyug (the district's administrative centre) by road. Bolshoy Dvor is the nearest rural locality.
