= Birichevo, Ust-Alexeyevskoye Rural Settlement, Velikoustyugsky District, Vologda Oblast =

Birichevo Биричево
- = Village
- Location within Vologda Oblast Location within Russia
- Coordinates: 60°24′N 46°31′E
- Country: Russia
- Region: Vologda Oblast
- District: Velikoustyugsky District
- Time zone: UTC+3:00

Birichevo (Russian: Биричево) is a rural locality (a village) in Ust-Alexeyevskoye Rural Settlement, Velikoustyugsky District, Vologda Oblast, Russia. The population was 66 as of 2002.

== Geography ==
The distance to Veliky Ustyug is 58 km, to Ust-Alexeyevo is 6 km. Pozharovo is the nearest rural locality.
