= Novosyolovo, Pokrovskoye Rural Settlement, Velikoustyugsky District, Vologda Oblast =

Novosyolovo Новосёлово
- Village
- Location within Vologda Oblast Location within Russia
- Coordinates: 60°38′N 46°36′E
- Country: Russia
- Region: Vologda Oblast
- District: Velikoustyugsky District
- Time zone: UTC+3:00

Novosyolovo (Russian: Новосёлово) is a rural locality (a village) in Pokrovskoye Rural Settlement, Velikoustyugsky District, Vologda Oblast, Russia. The population was 28 as of 2002.

== Geography ==
The distance to Veliky Ustyug is 19.5 km, to Ilyinskoye is 10.5 km. Kulakovo is the nearest rural locality.
