= Zagorye, Nizhneyerogodskoye Rural Settlement, Velikoustyugsky District, Vologda Oblast =

Zagorye Загорье
- Village
- Location within Vologda Oblast Location within Russia
- Coordinates: 60°43′N 45°45′E
- Country: Russia
- Region: Vologda Oblast
- District: Velikoustyugsky District
- Time zone: UTC+3:00

Zagorye (Russian: Загорье) is a rural locality (a village) in Nizhneyerogodskoye Rural Settlement, Velikoustyugsky District, Vologda Oblast, Russia. The population was 38 as of 2002.

== Geography ==
The distance to Veliky Ustyug is 38.8 km, to Lodeyka is 3.2 km. Malaya Gorka is the nearest rural locality.
