= Verkhneye Pankratovo =

Verkhneye Pankratovo Верхнее Панкратово
- Village
- Location within Vologda Oblast Location within Russia
- Coordinates: 60°45′N 46°25′E
- Country: Russia
- Region: Vologda Oblast
- District: Velikoustyugsky District
- Time zone: UTC+3:00

Verkhneye Pankratovo (Russian: Верхнее Панкратово) is a rural locality (a village) in Shemogodskoye Rural Settlement, Velikoustyugsky District, Vologda Oblast, Russia. The population was 7 as of 2002.

== Geography ==
Verkhneye Pankratovo is located 16 km east of Veliky Ustyug (the district's administrative centre) by road. Bolshiye Slobody is the nearest rural locality.
