= Vlasovo, Nizhneshardengskoye Rural Settlement, Velikoustyugsky District, Vologda Oblast =

Vlasovo Власово
- Village
- Location within Vologda Oblast Location within Russia
- Coordinates: 60°32′N 46°11′E
- Country: Russia
- Region: Vologda Oblast
- District: Velikoustyugsky District
- Time zone: UTC+3:00

Vlasovo (Russian: Власово) is a rural locality (a village) in Nizhneshardengskoye Rural Settlement, Velikoustyugsky District, Vologda Oblast, Russia. The population was 2 as of 2002.

== Geography ==
The distance to Veliky Ustyug is 26 km, to Peganovo is 1 km. Gerasimovo is the nearest rural locality.
