= Karasovo, Velikoustyugsky District, Vologda Oblast =

Karasovo Карасово
- Village
- Location within Vologda Oblast Location within Russia
- Coordinates: 60°40′N 46°19′E
- Country: Russia
- Region: Vologda Oblast
- District: Velikoustyugsky District
- Time zone: UTC+3:00

Karasovo (Russian: Карасово) is a rural locality (a village) and the administrative center of Parfyonovskoye Rural Settlement, Velikoustyugsky District, Vologda Oblast, Russia. The population was 250 as of 2002.

== Geography ==
Karasovo is located 15 km southeast of Veliky Ustyug (the district's administrative centre) by road. Verkhneye Gribtsovo is the nearest rural locality.
