= Peremilovo, Vologda Oblast =

Peremilovo Перемилово
- Village
- Location within Vologda Oblast Location within Russia
- Coordinates: 60°47′N 46°11′E
- Country: Russia
- Region: Vologda Oblast
- District: Velikoustyugsky District
- Time zone: UTC+3:00

Peremilovo (Russian: Перемилово) is a rural locality (a village) in Mardengskoye Rural Settlement, Velikoustyugsky District, Vologda Oblast, Russia. The population was 11 as of 2002. There is 1 street.

== Geography ==
Peremilovo is located 8 km (5.0 mi) northwest of Veliky Ustyug (the district's administrative centre) by road. Gruznishchevo is the nearest rural locality.
