= Bolshiye Slobody =

Bolshiye Slobody Большие Слободы
- Village
- Location within Vologda Oblast Location within Russia
- Coordinates: 60°45′N 46°27′E
- Country: Russia
- Region: Vologda Oblast
- District: Velikoustyugsky District
- Time zone: UTC+3:00

Bolshiye Slobody (Russian: Большие Слободы) is a rural locality (a village) in Shemogodskoye Rural Settlement, Velikoustyugsky District, Vologda Oblast, Russia. The population was 3 as of 2002.

== Geography ==
Bolshiye Slobody is located 18 km east of Veliky Ustyug (the district's administrative centre) by road. Verkhneye Pankratovo is the nearest rural locality.
