= Kalikino, Velikoustyugsky District, Vologda Oblast =

Kalikino Каликино
- Village
- Location within Vologda Oblast Location within Russia
- Coordinates: 60°44′N 46°16′E
- Country: Russia
- Region: Vologda Oblast
- District: Velikoustyugsky District
- Time zone: UTC+3:00

Kalikino (Russian: Каликино) is a rural locality (a village) in Tregubovskoye Rural Settlement, Velikoustyugsky District, Vologda Oblast, Russia. The population was 22 as of 2002. There are 6 streets.

== Geography ==
Kalikino is located 10 km southwest of Veliky Ustyug (the district's administrative centre) by road. Zaozerye is the nearest rural locality.
