= Nikulino, Yudinskoye Rural Settlement, Velikoustyugsky District, Vologda Oblast =

Nikulino Никулино
- Village
- Location within Vologda Oblast Location within Russia
- Coordinates: 60°47′N 46°21′E
- Country: Russia
- Region: Vologda Oblast
- District: Velikoustyugsky District
- Time zone: UTC+3:00

kmNikulino (Russian: Никулино) is a rural locality (a village) in Yudinskoye Rural Settlement, Velikoustyugsky District, Vologda Oblast, Russia. The population was 18 as of 2002.

== Geography ==
From Nikulino, the town of Veliky Ustyug is roughly three km away. Yudino, the nearest rural locality, is four km away.
