= Malinovo, Velikoustyugsky District, Vologda Oblast =

Malinovo Малиново
- Village
- Location within Vologda Oblast Location within Russia
- Coordinates: 60°22′N 46°36′E
- Country: Russia
- Region: Vologda Oblast
- District: Velikoustyugsky District
- Time zone: UTC+3:00

Malinovo (Russian: Малиново) is a rural locality (a village) in Verkhnevarzhenskoye Rural Settlement, Velikoustyugsky District, Vologda Oblast, Russia. The population was 15 as of 2002.

== Geography ==
Malinovo is located 71 km southeast of Veliky Ustyug (the district's administrative centre) by road. Stryukovo is the nearest rural locality.
