= Podgorye, Velikoustyugsky District, Vologda Oblast =

Podgorye Подгорье
- Village
- Location within Vologda Oblast Location within Russia
- Coordinates: 60°58′N 46°29′E
- Country: Russia
- Region: Vologda Oblast
- District: Velikoustyugsky District
- Time zone: UTC+3:00

Podgorye (Russian: Подгорье) is a rural locality (a village) in Krasavino Urban Settlement, Velikoustyugsky District, Vologda Oblast, Russia. The population was 10 as of 2002.

== Geography ==
Podgorye is located 29 km northeast of Veliky Ustyug (the district's administrative centre) by road. Korobovskoye is the nearest rural locality.
