= Teplogorye =

Teplogorye Теплогорье
- Village
- Location within Vologda Oblast Location within Russia
- Coordinates: 60°27′N 46°40′E
- Country: Russia
- Region: Vologda Oblast
- District: Velikoustyugsky District
- Time zone: UTC+3:00

Teplogorye (Russian: Теплогорье) is a rural locality (a village) and the administrative center of Teplogorskoye Rural Settlement, Velikoustyugsky District, Vologda Oblast, Russia. The population was 392 as of 2002. There are five streets.

== Geography ==
Teplogorye is located 67 km southeast of Veliky Ustyug (the district's administrative centre) by road. Berezovka is the nearest rural locality.
