= Yershovo, Velikoustyugsky District, Vologda Oblast =

Yershovo Ершово
- Village
- Location within Vologda Oblast Location within Russia
- Coordinates: 60°26′N 46°48′E
- Country: Russia
- Region: Vologda Oblast
- District: Velikoustyugsky District
- Time zone: UTC+3:00

Yershovo (Russian: Ершово) is a rural locality (a village) in Teplogorskoye Rural Settlement, Velikoustyugsky District, Vologda Oblast, Russia. The population was 57 as of 2002.

== Geography ==
Yershovo is located 75 km southeast of Veliky Ustyug (the district's administrative centre) by road. Pestovo is the nearest rural locality.
