= Zhuravlevo =

Zhuravlevo Журавлево
- Village
- Location within Vologda Oblast Location within Russia
- Coordinates: 60°47′N 46°18′E
- Country: Russia
- Region: Vologda Oblast
- District: Velikoustyugsky District
- Time zone: UTC+3:00

Zhuravlevo (Russian: Журавлево) is a rural locality (a village) in Yudinskoye Rural Settlement, Velikoustyugsky District, Vologda Oblast, Russia. The population was 47 as of 2002. There are 6 streets.

== Geography ==
Zhuravlevo is located 5 km northeast of Veliky Ustyug (the district's administrative centre) by road. Energetik is the nearest rural locality.
