= Malinniki, Vologda Oblast =

Malinniki Малинники
- Village
- Location within Vologda Oblast Location within Russia
- Coordinates: 60°28′N 46°27′E
- Country: Russia
- Region: Vologda Oblast
- District: Velikoustyugsky District
- Time zone: UTC+3:00

Malinniki (Russian: Малинники) is a rural locality (a village) in Ust-Alexeyevskoye Rural Settlement, Velikoustyugsky District, Vologda Oblast, Russia. The population was 2 as of 2002.

== Geography ==
Malinniki is located 57 km south of Veliky Ustyug (the district's administrative centre) by road. Ust-Alexeyevo is the nearest rural locality.
