= Rozhkovo, Vologda Oblast =

Rozhkovo Рожково
- Village
- Location within Vologda Oblast Location within Russia
- Coordinates: 60°33′N 46°30′E
- Country: Russia
- Region: Vologda Oblast
- District: Velikoustyugsky District
- Time zone: UTC+3:00

Rozhkovo (Russian: Рожково) is a rural locality (a village) in Parfyonovskoye Rural Settlement, Velikoustyugsky District, Vologda Oblast, Russia. The population was 9 as of 2002.

== Geography ==
Rozhkovo is located 34 km southeast of Veliky Ustyug (the district's administrative centre) by road. Konkovo is the nearest rural locality.
