= Zherebyatyevo =

Zherebyatyevo Жеребятьево
- Village
- Location within Vologda Oblast Location within Russia
- Coordinates: 60°45′N 46°14′E
- Country: Russia
- Region: Vologda Oblast
- District: Velikoustyugsky District
- Time zone: UTC+3:00

Zherebyatyevo (Russian: Жеребятьево) is a rural locality (a village) in Satovoinskoye Rural Settlement, Velikoustyugsky District, Vologda Oblast, Russia. The population was 56 as of 2002.

== Geography ==
Zherebyatyevo is located 5 km west of Veliky Ustyug (the district's administrative centre) by road. Valga is the nearest rural locality.
