= Pupyshevo =

Pupyshevo Пупышево
- Village
- Location within Vologda Oblast Location within Russia
- Coordinates: 60°42′N 45°54′E
- Country: Russia
- Region: Vologda Oblast
- District: Velikoustyugsky District
- Time zone: UTC+3:00

Pupyshevo (Russian: Пупышево) is a rural locality (a village) in Nezhneyerogodskoye Rural Settlement, Velikoustyugsky District, Vologda Oblast, Russia. The population was 5 as of 2002.

== Geography ==
Pupyshevo is located 29 km southwest of Veliky Ustyug (the district's administrative centre) by road. Zaruchevye is the nearest rural locality.
