= Novator, Vologda Oblast =

Novator Новатор
- Village
- Location within Vologda Oblast Location within Russia
- Coordinates: 60°44′N 46°12′E
- Country: Russia
- Region: Vologda Oblast
- District: Velikoustyugsky District
- Time zone: UTC+3:00

Novator (Russian: Новатор) is a rural locality (a village) and the administrative center of Samotovinskoye Rural Settlement, Velikoustyugsky District, Vologda Oblast, Russia. The population was 2,767 as of 2002. There are 40 streets.

== Geography ==
Novator is located 7 km southwest of Veliky Ustyug (the district's administrative centre) by road. Valga is the nearest rural locality.
