= Kichuga =

Kichuga Кичуга
- Settlement
- Location within Vologda Oblast Location within Russia
- Coordinates: 60°37′N 45°40′E
- Country: Russia
- Region: Vologda Oblast
- District: Velikoustyugsky District
- Time zone: UTC+3:00

Kichuga (Russian: Кичуга) is a rural locality (a settlement) in the Opokskoye Rural Settlement, Velikoustyugsky District, Vologda Oblast, Russia. The population was 35 as of 2002.

== Geography ==
Kichuga is located 51 km southwest of Veliky Ustyug (the district's administrative centre) by road. Verkhnyaya Kichuga is the nearest rural locality.
