= Semennikovo =

Semennikovo Семенниково
- Village
- Location within Vologda Oblast Location within Russia
- Coordinates: 60°38′N 46°17′E
- Country: Russia
- Region: Vologda Oblast
- District: Velikoustyugsky District
- Time zone: UTC+3:00

Semennikovo (Russian: Семенниково) is a rural locality (a village) in Parfyonovskoye Rural Settlement, Velikoustyugsky District, Vologda Oblast, Russia. The population was 2 as of 2002.

== Geography ==
Semennikovo is located 19 km south of Veliky Ustyug (the district's administrative centre) by road. Nizhneye Gribtsovo is the nearest rural locality.
