= Valga, Vologda Oblast =

Valga Валга
- Settlement
- Location within Vologda Oblast Location within Russia
- Coordinates: 60°45′N 46°14′E
- Country: Russia
- Region: Vologda Oblast
- District: Velikoustyugsky District
- Time zone: UTC+3:00

Valga (Russian: Валга) is a rural locality (a settlement) in Samotovinskoye Rural Settlement, Velikoustyugsky District, Vologda Oblast, Russia. The population was 193 as of 2002. There are five streets.

== Geography ==
Valga is located 6 km southwest of Veliky Ustyug (the district's administrative centre) by road. Zherebyatyevo is the nearest rural locality.
