= Udachino =

Udachino Удачино
- Village
- Location within Vologda Oblast Location within Russia
- Coordinates: 60°21′N 46°37′E
- Country: Russia
- Region: Vologda Oblast
- District: Velikoustyugsky District
- Time zone: UTC+3:00

Udachino (Russian: Удачино) is a rural locality (a village) in Verkhnevarzhenskoye Rural Settlement, Velikoustyugsky District, Vologda Oblast, Russia. The population was 27 in 2002.

== Geography ==
Udachino is located 70 kilometres (43 mi) southeast of Veliky Ustyug (the district's administrative centre) by road. Makarovo is the nearest rural locality.
