= Korobovskoye =

Korobovskoye Коробовское
- Village
- Location within Vologda Oblast Location within Russia
- Coordinates: 60°58′N 46°30′E
- Country: Russia
- Region: Vologda Oblast
- District: Velikoustyugsky District
- Time zone: UTC+3:00

Korobovskoye (Russian: Коробовское) is a rural locality (a village) in Krasavino Urban Settlement, Velikoustyugsky District, Vologda Oblast, Russia. The population was 8 as of 2002.

== Geography ==
Korobovskoye is located 30 km northeast of Veliky Ustyug (the district's administrative centre) by road. Korolyovo is the nearest rural locality.
