= Burlevo =

Burlevo Бурлево
- Village
- Location within Vologda Oblast Location within Russia
- Coordinates: 60°32′N 46°26′E
- Country: Russia
- Region: Vologda Oblast
- District: Velikoustyugsky District
- Time zone: UTC+3:00

Burlevo (Russian: Бурлево) is a rural locality (a village) in Ust-Alexeyevskoye Rural Settlement, Velikoustyugsky District, Vologda Oblast, Russia. The population was 4 as of 2002.

== Geography ==
Burlevo is located 64 km southeast of Veliky Ustyug (the district's administrative centre) by road. Artemovka is the nearest rural locality.
