= Belozerovo =

Belozerovo Белозерово
- Village
- Location within Vologda Oblast Location within Russia
- Coordinates: 60°45′N 46°17′E
- Country: Russia
- Region: Vologda Oblast
- District: Velikoustyugsky District
- Time zone: UTC+3:00

Belozerovo (Russian: Белозерово) is a rural locality (a village) in Tregubovskoye Rural Settlement, Velikoustyugsky District, Vologda Oblast, Russia. The population was 119 as of 2002.

== Geography ==
The distance to Veliky Ustyug is 13.5 km, to Morozovitsa is 7.7 km. Barsukovo is the nearest rural locality.
