= Olennikovo =

Olennikovo Оленниково
- Village
- Location within Vologda Oblast Location within Russia
- Coordinates: 60°39′N 46°14′E
- Country: Russia
- Region: Vologda Oblast
- District: Velikoustyugsky District
- Time zone: UTC+3:00

Olennikovo (Russian: Оленниково) is a rural locality (a village) in Tregubovskoye Rural Settlement, Velikoustyugsky District, Vologda Oblast, Russia. The population was 1 as of 2002.

== Geography ==
Olennikovo is located 22 km southwest of Veliky Ustyug (the district's administrative centre) by road. Starkovo is the nearest rural locality.
