= Klimlevo =

Klimlevo Климлево
- Village
- Location within Vologda Oblast Location within Russia
- Coordinates: 60°47′N 46°28′E
- Country: Russia
- Region: Vologda Oblast
- District: Velikoustyugsky District
- Time zone: UTC+3:00

Klimlevo (Russian: Климлево) is a rural locality (a village) in Shemogodskoye Rural Settlement, Velikoustyugsky District, Vologda Oblast, Russia. The population was 10 as of 2002.

== Geography ==
Klimlevo is located 26 km northeast of Veliky Ustyug (the district's administrative centre) by road. Kozlovo is the nearest rural locality.
