= Kremenye =

Kremenye Кременье
- Village
- Location within Vologda Oblast Location within Russia
- Coordinates: 60°38′N 46°12′E
- Country: Russia
- Region: Vologda Oblast
- District: Velikoustyugsky District
- Time zone: UTC+3:00

Kremenye (Russian: Кременье) is a rural locality (a village) in Tregubovskoye Rural Settlement, Velikoustyugsky District, Vologda Oblast, Russia. The population was 12 as of 2002.

== Geography ==
Kremenye is located 20 km southwest of Veliky Ustyug (the district's administrative centre) by road. Shchekino is the nearest rural locality.
