= Afurino =

Afurino Афурино
- Village
- Location within Vologda Oblast Location within Russia
- Coordinates: 60°49′N 46°13′E
- Country: Russia
- Region: Vologda Oblast
- District: Velikoustyugsky District
- Time zone: UTC+3:00

Afurino (Russian: Афурино) is a rural locality (a village) in Yudinskoye Rural Settlement, Velikoustyugsky District, Vologda Oblast, Russia. The population was 12 as of 2002.

== Geography ==
Afurino is located 10 km northwest of Veliky Ustyug (the district's administrative centre) by road. Gorka is the nearest rural locality.
