= French invasion of Russia =

1812 conflict during the Napoleonic Wars

- Part of the Napoleonic Wars
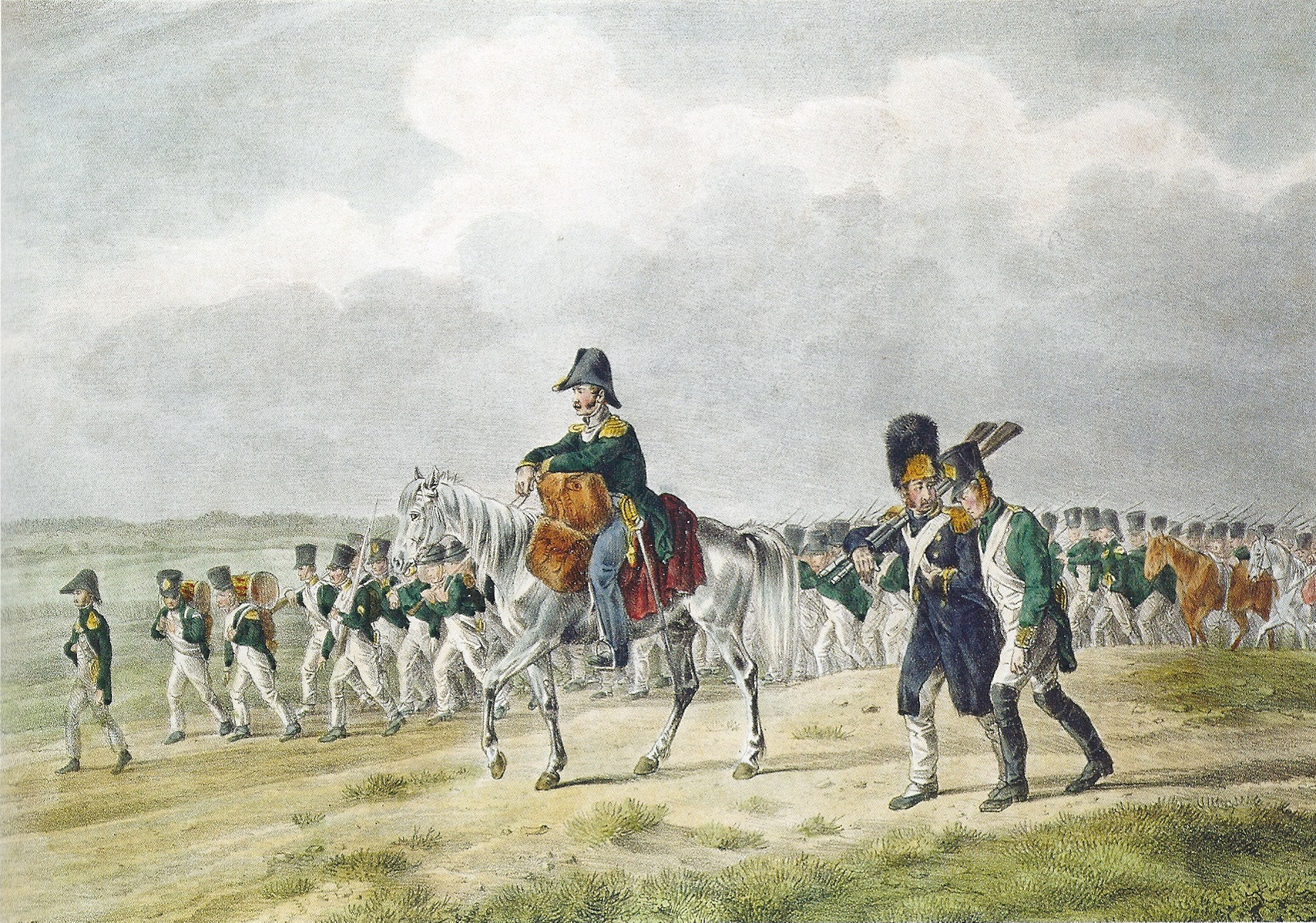
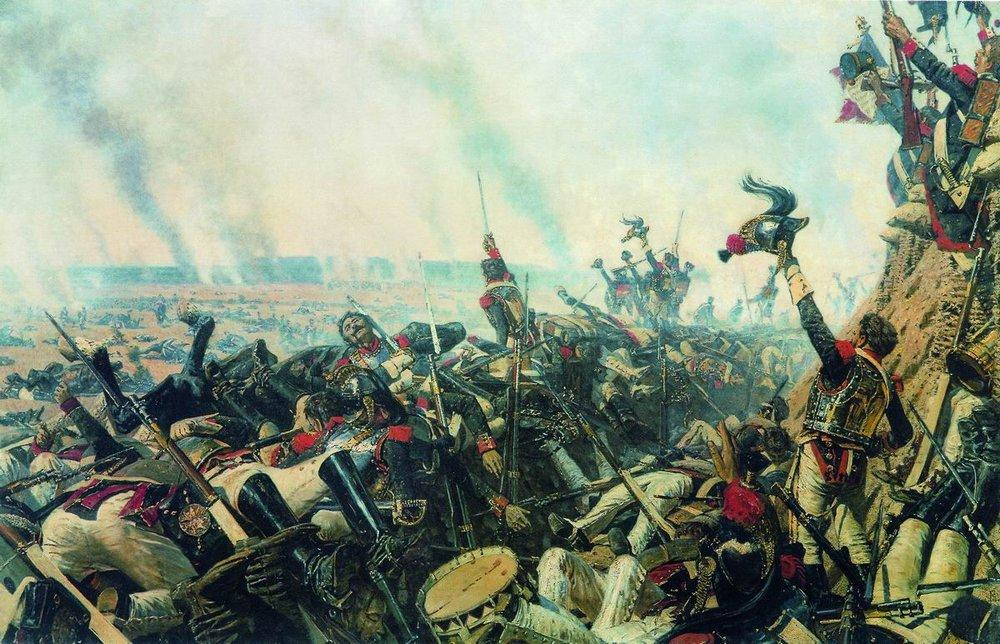
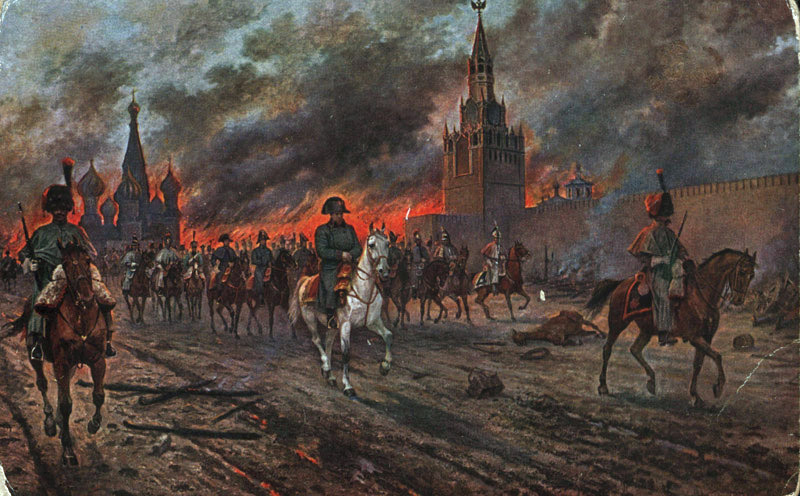
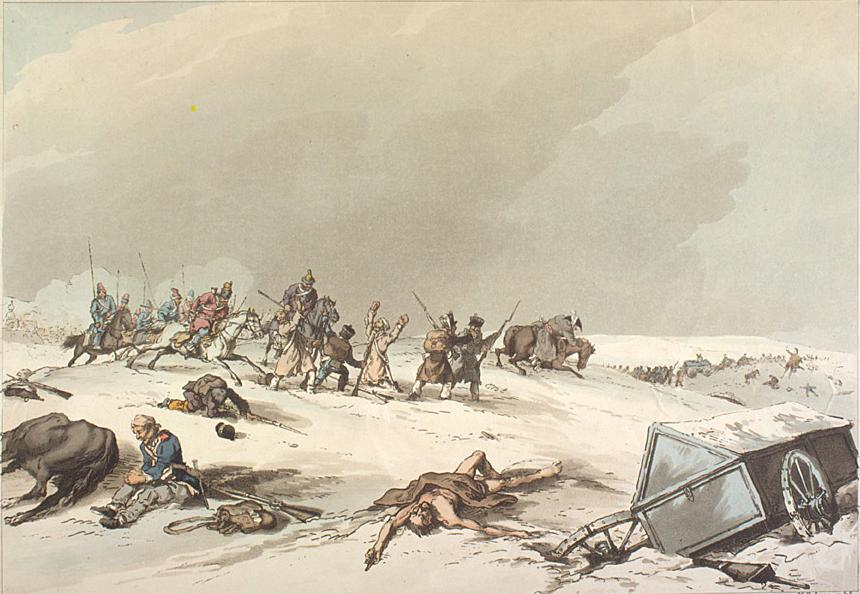
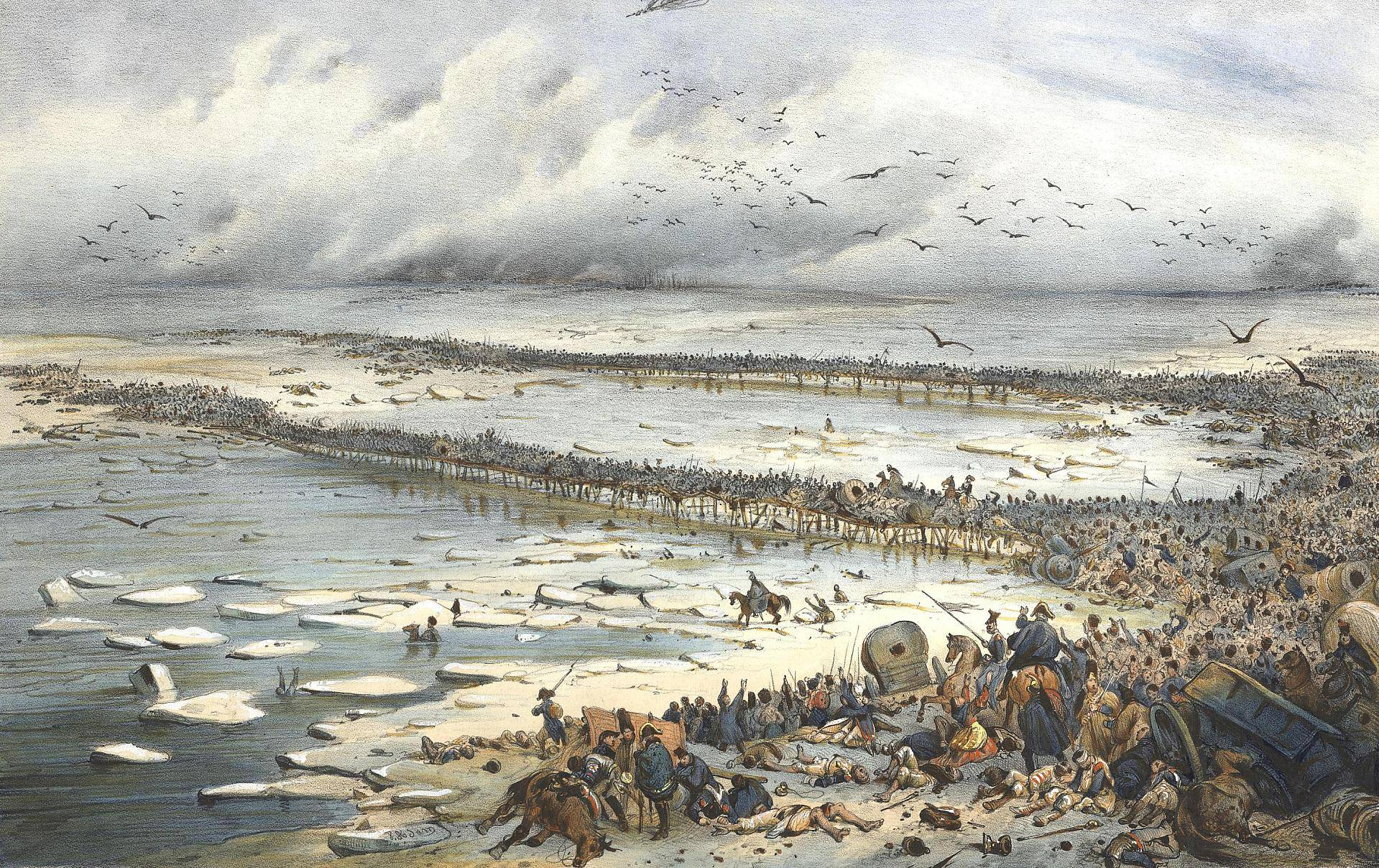
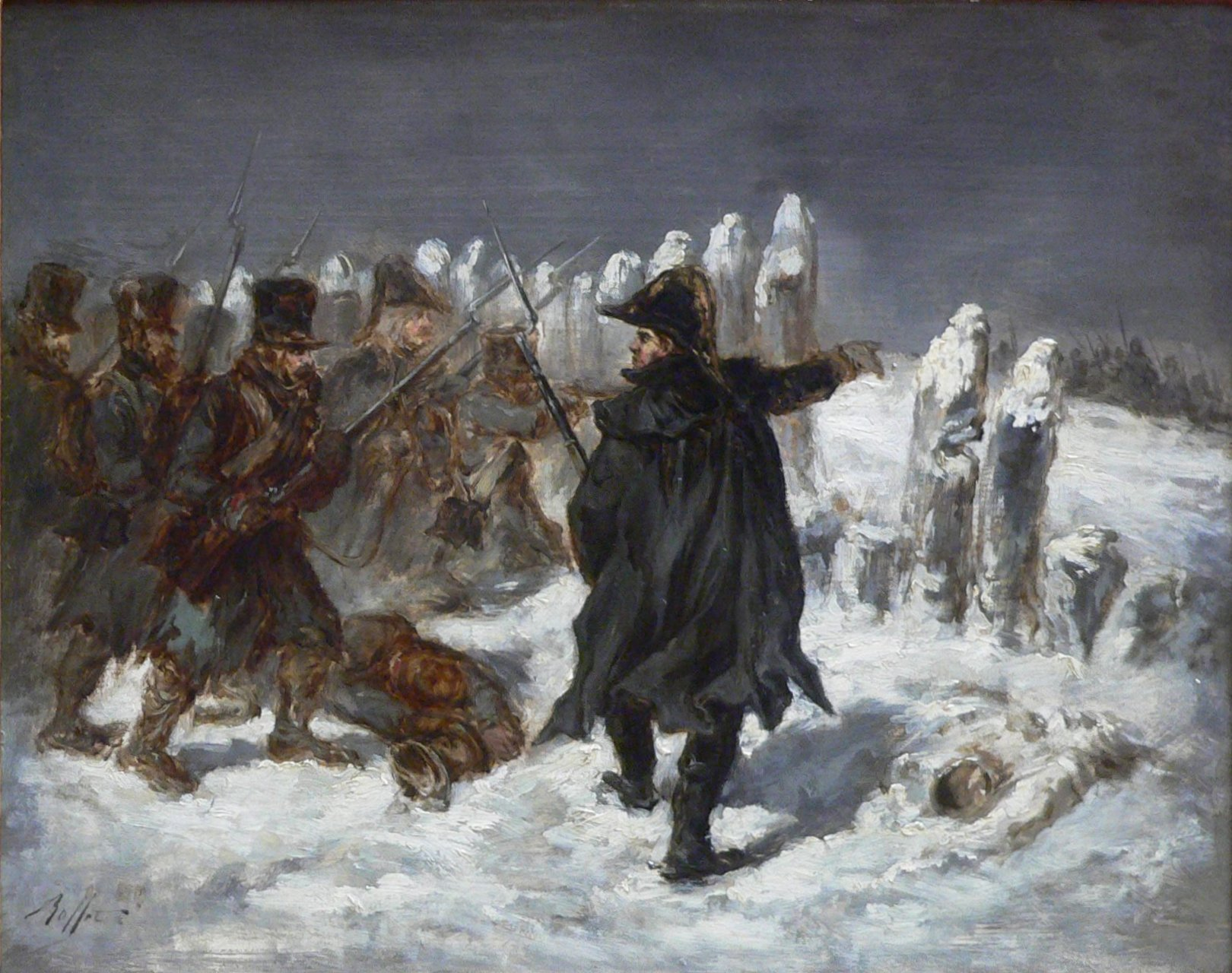
- Top to bottom, left to right: Italian soldiers struggling with thirst and heat by Albrecht Adam; The end of Borodino battle by Vasily Vereshchagin; Moscow burning by Viktor Mazurovsky; French soldiers attacked by Russian Cossacks; Crossing the Berezina River by Victor Adam; Marshal Ney at the Kaunas redoubt by Auguste Raffet
Date	24 June – 24 December 1812 (6 months)
Location	Russian Empire
Result	Russian victory

Belligerents
(First French Empire) French Empire; Duchy of Warsaw; Lithuanian Provisional Governing Commission; Italy; Naples; Swiss Confederacy; Austria; Prussia Rhine Confederation: (Kingdom of Saxony) Saxony; (Kingdom of Bavaria) Bavaria; (Kingdom of Westphalia) Westphalia; (Kingdom of Württemberg) Württemberg; (Grand Duchy of Hesse) Hesse; Berg; (Grand Duchy of Baden) Baden; Frankfurt; Würzburg	Russian Empire; United Kingdom

Commanders and leaders
(First French Empire) Napoleon I other commanders: List: (First French Empire) Pierre Augereau; (Kingdom of Italy (Napoleonic)) Eugène de Beauharnais; (First French Empire) Jean-Baptiste Bessières; Jérôme Bonaparte; (First French Empire) Louis-Nicolas Davout; (First French Empire) Jean-Andoche Junot; (First French Empire) François Joseph Lefebvre; (First French Empire) Étienne Macdonald; (First French Empire) Édouard Mortier; (Kingdom of Naples) Joachim Murat; (First French Empire) Michel Ney; (First French Empire) Nicolas Oudinot; Józef Poniatowski; (First French Empire) Jean Reynier; (First French Empire) Laurent Saint-Cyr; (First French Empire) Ambroży Mikołaj Skarżyński; (Austrian Empire) Karl von Schwarzenberg; (First French Empire) Claude Victor; (Kingdom of Prussia) Johann Yorck	(Russian Empire) Alexander I other commanders: List: (Russian Empire) Aleksey Arakcheyev; (Russian Empire) Pyotr Bagration †; (Russian Empire) Alexander Balashov; (Russian Empire) Mikhail Barclay de Tolly; (Russian Empire) Alexander von Benckendorff; (Russian Empire) Levin von Bennigsen; (Russian Empire) Pavel Chichagov; (Russian Empire) Eufemiusz Czaplic; (Russian Empire) Dmitry Dokhturov; (Russian Empire) Dmitry Golitsyn; (Russian Empire) Yakov Kulnev †; (Russian Empire) Mikhail Kutuzov; (Russian Empire) Charles de Lambert; (Russian Empire) Mikhail Miloradovich; (Russian Empire) Vasily Orlov-Denisov; (Russian Empire) Alexander Osterman-Tolstoy; (Russian Empire) Fabian Osten-Sacken; (Russian Empire) Peter von der Pahlen; (Russian Empire) Matvei Platov; (Russian Empire) Nikolay Raevsky; (Russian Empire) Pavel Stroganov; (Russian Empire) Alexander Tormasov; (Russian Empire) Nikolay Tuchkov †; (Russian Empire) Peter Wittgenstein; (Russian Empire) Aleksey Yermolov; (United Kingdom of Great Britain and Ireland) Thomas Byam Martin

Strength
600,000–685,000 total: 440,000–449,000 – First wave; 134,000 – Borodino; 108,000 – Maloyaroslavets; 33,000 – Berezina	571,000–713,000 total: 198,000 – First wave; 118,000 – Borodino; 129,000 – Maloyaroslavets; 126,000 – Berezina

Casualties and losses
580,000–630,000: 300,000–350,000 dead; 100,000 killed in combat; 200,000 died from other causes; 50,000 died in captivity; 180,000 wounded; 50,000 deserted; 50,000 captured	410,000: 210,000 dead; 150,000 wounded; 50,000 deserted
- Total military and civilian deaths: c. 1,000,000

French invasion of Russia
Prussian corps
Napoleon
Austrian corps

The French invasion of Russia, also known as the Russian campaign, (Note: French: Campagne de Russie) the Second Polish War, and in Russia as the Patriotic War of 1812, (Note: Russian: Отечественная война 1812 года, romanized: Otechestvennaya voyna 1812 goda) was initiated by Napoleon with the aim of forcing the Russian Empire to comply with the continental blockade of the United Kingdom. Widely studied, Napoleon's incursion into Russia remains a focal point in military history, recognized as among the most devastating military endeavors to ever unfold. In the span of less than six months, the campaign claimed the lives of around a million soldiers and civilians.

Beginning on 24 June 1812, the initial wave of the multinational Grande Armée crossed the Neman River, marking the entry from the Duchy of Warsaw into Russia. Employing extensive forced marches, Napoleon rapidly advanced his army of nearly half a million men through Western Russia, encompassing present-day Belarus, in a bid to dismantle the disparate Russian forces led by Barclay de Tolly and Pyotr Bagration totaling approximately 180,000–220,000 soldiers at that juncture. Despite suffering enormous losses from extreme weather conditions, disease, desertion and inadequate supplies, Napoleon captured Smolensk after a two-day battle in August 1812, although the main Russian armies escaped encirclement. The Russian army continued to retreat deeper into Russia, forcing Napoleon to rely on an increasingly overstretched supply system that was incapable of sustaining such a large army in the field.

Following the Battle of Smolensk, Alexander I appointed Mikhail Kutuzov commander-in-chief of the Russian armies. The decision was widely welcomed by the army and the public, many of whom had become dissatisfied with Barclay de Tolly's continued retreats. Although Kutuzov enjoyed greater prestige than his predecessor, he largely maintained the same strategy of withdrawing deeper into Russia while preserving the army. In the fierce Battle of Borodino, located 110 kilometres (70 mi) west of Moscow, Napoleon failed to destroy the Russian army, while Kutuzov was unable to halt the French advance. At the Council at Fili, Kutuzov made the critical decision not to defend Moscow but to order a general withdrawal, prioritizing the preservation of the Russian army. On 14 September, Napoleon and his roughly 100,000-strong army took control of Moscow, only to discover it deserted and set ablaze by its military governor Fyodor Rostopchin. Remaining in Moscow for five weeks, Napoleon awaited a peace proposal that never materialized. Due to favorable weather conditions, Napoleon delayed his retreat and, hoping to secure supplies, began a different route westward than the one the army had devastated on the way there. However, after losing the Battle of Maloyaroslavets, he was compelled to retrace his initial path.

As early November arrived, snowfall and frost complicated the retreat. Shortages of food and winter attire for the soldiers and provision for the horses, combined with guerilla warfare from Russian peasants and Cossacks, resulted in significant losses. More than half of the soldiers perished from starvation, exhaustion, typhus, and the unforgiving continental climate.

During the Battle of Krasnoi, Napoleon faced a critical scarcity of cavalry and artillery due to severe snowfall and icy conditions. Employing a strategic maneuver, he deployed the Old Guard against Miloradovich, who obstructed the primary road to Krasny, effectively isolating him from the main army. Of the French commanders, Davout successfully broke through, whereas Eugene de Beauharnais and Michel Ney were forced to take a detour. Despite the consolidation of several retreating French corps with the main army, by the time he reached the Berezina river, Napoleon commanded only around 49,000 troops alongside 40,000 stragglers of little military significance. On 5 December, Napoleon departed from the army at Smorgonie in a sled and returned to Paris. Within a few days, an additional 20,000 people succumbed to the bitter cold and diseases carried by lice. Murat and Ney assumed command, pressing forward but leaving over 20,000 men in the hospitals of Vilnius. The remnants of the principal armies, disheartened, crossed the frozen Neman and the Bug.

While exact figures remain elusive due to the absence of meticulous records, estimations varied and often included exaggerated counts, overlooking auxiliary troops. Napoleon's initial force upon entering Russia exceeded 450,000 men, over 150,000 horses, approximately 25,000 wagons, and nearly 1,400 artillery pieces. However, the surviving count dwindled to 120,000 men (excluding early deserters), (Note: 50,000 were Austrians, Prussians, and other Germans, 20,000 were Poles, and just 35,000 were Frenchmen.) signifying a staggering loss of approximately 380,000 lives (dead or missing/prisoner) throughout the campaign, half from diseases. This catastrophic outcome shattered Napoleon's once-untarnished reputation of invincibility. The great loss of cavalry would particularly affect him in the subsequent campaigns. Russian losses were nearly as large, with the campaign whittling down their field army to 40,000 effectives by the time they reached the Neman River. With the considerable resources of the French Empire at his disposal (more than Russia's), Napoleon quickly went about reconstituting his army, but in this moment of opportunity Austria and Prussia switched sides to that of Russia and Britain, greatly shifting the balance of power and triggering the War of the Sixth Coalition.

== Names ==
The French invasion is known as the Russian campaign, the Second Polish War, the Second Polish campaign, (Note: French: seconde [deuxième] campagne de Pologne) the Patriotic War of 1812 (in Russia), or the War of 1812. It should not be confused with the Soviet term for the German invasion Operation Barbarossa during the Second World War, the Great Patriotic War (Великая Отечественная война, Velikaya Otechestvennaya Voyna). Nor should it be confused with the concurrent conflict between Great Britain and the United States, also known as the War of 1812. In Russian literature written before the Russian Revolution, the war was occasionally described as "the invasion of twelve nations" (Russian: нашествие двенадцати языков). Napoleon termed the war the "Second Polish War" to gain support from Polish nationalists and patriots. Though the stated goal of the war was the resurrection of the Polish state on the territories of the former Polish–Lithuanian Commonwealth (modern territories of Poland, Lithuania, Latvia, Belarus, and Ukraine), in fact, this issue was of no real concern to Napoleon.

== Background ==
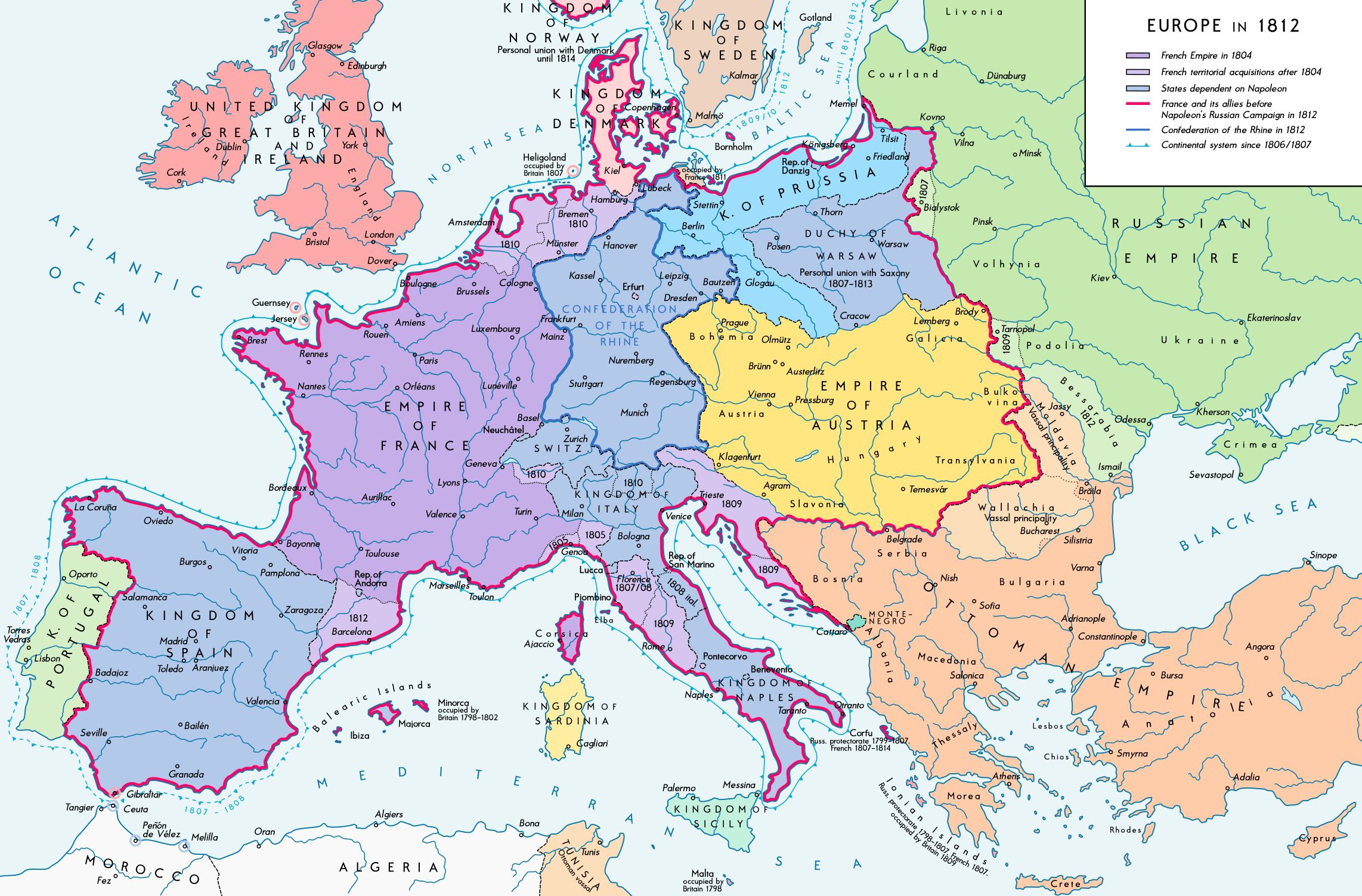
The French Empire in 1812

From 1792 onwards, France found itself frequently embroiled in conflicts with major European powers, a direct aftermath of the French Revolution. Napoleon, rising to power in 1799 and assuming autocratic rule over France, orchestrated numerous military campaigns that led to the establishment of the First French Empire. Starting in 1803, the Napoleonic Wars served as a testament to Napoleon's military prowess. He secured victories in the War of the Third Coalition (1803–1806, leading to the dissolution of the thousand-year-old Holy Roman Empire), the War of the Fourth Coalition (1806–1807), and the War of the Fifth Coalition (1809).

In 1807, following a French triumph at Friedland, Napoleon and Alexander I of Russia signed the Treaty of Tilsit along the Neman River. These treaties progressively solidified Russia's alignment with France, allowing Napoleon to exert dominance over neighboring states. The accord rendered Russia an ally of France, leading to their adoption of the Continental System, a blockade aimed at the United Kingdom. However, the treaty imposed significant economic strain on Russia, prompting Tsar Alexander to break away from the Continental blockade on 31 December 1810. Russia at this point of history had relied on trade through the Oresund to trade with Europe but since the continental system blockaded Britain the trade route would be rendered useless. This caused the Russians to withdraw from the agreement in a neutral stance. This decision left Napoleon without his primary foreign policy tool against the United Kingdom.

The Treaty of Schönbrunn, concluding the 1809 conflict between Austria and France, included a clause that transferred Western Galicia from Austria and annexed it to the Duchy of Warsaw. This move was seen unfavorably by Russia, perceiving the territory's annexation as a potential threat for a French invasion point. Russia's Foreign Minister Nikolay Rumyantsev advocated a closer alliance with France in response.

In an attempt to secure greater cooperation from Russia, Napoleon initially pursued an alliance by proposing marriage to Anna Pavlovna, the youngest sister of Alexander. However, he ultimately married Marie Louise, the daughter of the Austrian emperor. Subsequently, France and Austria solidified their relationship by signing an alliance treaty on 14 March 1812.

In March 1811, Marshal Davout received orders to clandestinely prepare for a demonstration of military strength aimed at impressing Russia. This plan involved deploying (Dutch) troops to Magdeburg and occupying the Baltic ports Stettin and Danzig. During this period, Napoleon's physical and mental condition underwent changes. He experienced weight gain and increasing susceptibility to various health issues. In May 1812, he left his palace in Saint-Cloud; one month later he arrived in Toruń.

=== Russian military reforms ===
The Russians did not sit idle and learned from previous defeats, which included Austerlitz and Friedland. Construction of fortresses began in Dinaburg (now Daugavpils), and Bobruysk (now Babruysk), fortresses in Kiev (now Kyiv) and Riga were reconstructed, new rear food supply depots were established, and military reforms were carried out in 1810–1812. The highest military administration was transformed: in January 1812, the "Institution for the Administration of the Large Active Army" (applicable until 1846) was adopted – a new regulation on field troop command that managed the activities of army headquarters. The divisional system was improved (an infantry division now consisted of four infantry and two jaeger regiments), and the corps system was officially established for the first time in the Russian Army. On the initiative of Barclay de Tolly, troop training in aimed fire and actions in skirmish formations was organised. Military intelligence agencies were created: the Secret Expedition under the Minister of War (Barclay de Tolly; 1810; strategic intelligence) and the Supreme Military Police (1812; counterintelligence); positions of military attaché were introduced at Russian embassies (1810; they were engaged in collecting military, economic, and other information). Based on military intelligence, Barclay created offensive plans in case of a new possible war. The Arakcheyev artillery system was introduced in exchange for the Shuvalov system.

== Declaration of war ==
Committed to Catherine the Great's expansion policy, Alexander I issued an ultimatum in April 1812, demanding the evacuation of French troops from Prussia and the Grand Duchy of Warsaw. When Napoleon chose war over retreat, between June 8 and 20, the troops remained in constant motion, enduring arduous marches amid intense heat. Napoleon's primary objective was to defeat the Imperial Russian Army and compel Tsar Alexander I to rejoin to the Continental System. From 21 to 22 June 1812, Bonaparte stayed at Vilkaviškis Manor. There Napoleon announced the following proclamation:

Soldiers, the second Polish war is begun. The first terminated at Friedland, and at Tilsit, Russia vowed an eternal alliance with France, and war with the English. She now breaks her vows and refuses to give any explanation of her strange conduct until the French eagles have repassed the Rhine, and left our allies at her mercy. Russia is hurried away by a fatality: her destinies will be fulfilled. Does she think us degenerated? Are we no more the soldiers who fought at Austerlitz? She places us between dishonour and war—our choice cannot be difficult. Let us then march forward; let us cross the Neman and carry the war into her country. This second Polish war will be as glorious for the French arms as the first has been, but the peace we shall conclude shall carry with it its own guarantee, and will terminate the fatal influence which Russia for fifty years past has exercised in Europe.

== Logistics ==
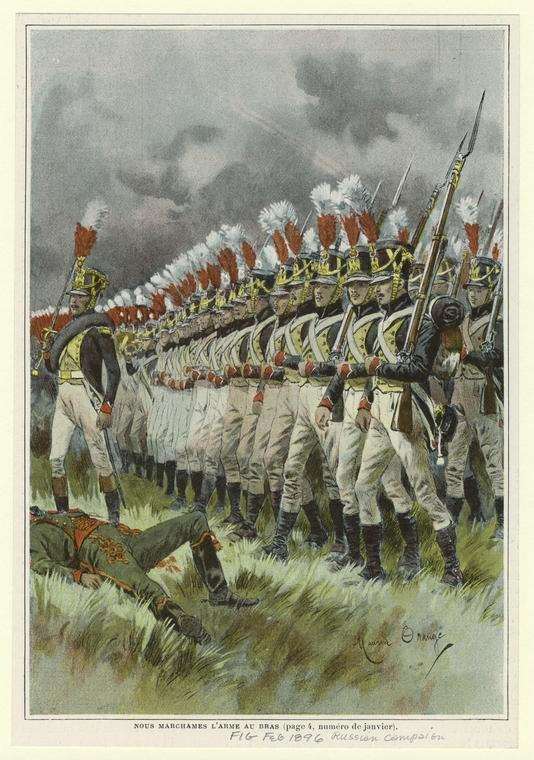
French attack by infantry

The invasion of Russia starkly highlights the pivotal role of logistics in military strategy, particularly in situations where the available terrain cannot sustain the large number of deployed troops. Napoleon meticulously prepared for supplying his army, significantly surpassing the logistical efforts of previous campaigns.

To sustain the Grande Armée and its operations, twenty train battalions with 7,848 vehicles were mobilised to provide a 40-day supply. Extensive magazines were strategically set up in towns and cities across Poland and East Prussia, while the Vistula river valley was developed into a vital supply base in 1811–1812. Intendant/Quartermaster General Dumas organized five supply lines from the Rhine to the Vistula, establishing administrative headquarters in three arrondissements in French-controlled Germany and Poland. This logistical preparation served as a significant trial of Napoleon's administrative and logistical acumen, with his focus in the first half of 1812 dedicated mainly to provisioning his invading army.

Napoleon's study of Russian geography and history, including Swedish invasion of Russia in 1708–1709 led by Charles XII, reinforced his understanding of the imperative to transport as many supplies as possible. The French Army's prior experience operating in the sparsely populated and underdeveloped regions of Poland and East Prussia during the War of the Fourth Coalition (1806–1807) also informed their approach.

However, nothing was to go as planned, because Napoleon had failed to take into account conditions that were totally different from what he had known so far.

Napoleon and the Grande Armée were accustomed to utilizing the method of living off the land, which proved successful in the densely populated and agriculturally prosperous regions of central Europe, characterized by a well-connected network of roads. Swift forced marches had disoriented the traditional Austrian and Prussian armies, relying extensively on foraging for sustenance. Colonel Pion documented the logistical challenges that this strategy imposed on the army:

There is no fodder for the horses; as usual there is no order or administration; the Army must live by the sword, and even on Prussian territory and with their allies, the troops pillage atrociously, as if they were in an enemy's country.

During the campaign, the widespread death and depletion of horses emerged as a significant issue. Forced marches often forced troops to go without essential supplies, as supply wagons struggled to keep pace; The scarcity of roads, frequently turned to mud by rainstorms (rasputitsa), further impeded horse-drawn wagons and artillery.

In thinly populated and agriculturally sparse regions, the lack of food and water led to casualties among troops and their mounts, exposing them to waterborne diseases from drinking contaminated water and consuming spoiled food and forage. While the foremost sections of the army received whatever provisions could be supplied, formations behind them suffered from starvation. During the attack phase, Vilnius stood as the most advanced magazine in the operational area. Beyond that point, the army had to rely solely on its own resources.

=== Provisions and transportation ===
Danzig contained enough provisions to feed 400,000 men for 50 days. Breslau, Płock, and Wyszogród were turned into grain depots, milling vast quantities of flour for delivery to Thorn, where 60,000 biscuits were produced every day. A large bakery was established at Villenberg (Braniewo County). 50,000 cattle were collected to follow the army. After the invasion began, large magazines were constructed at Kaunas, Vilnius, and Minsk, with the Vilnius base having enough rations to feed 100,000 men for 40 days. It also contained 27,000 muskets and 30,000 pairs of shoes, along with brandy and wine. Medium-sized depots were established at Vitebsk, Orsha, and Smolensk, and several small ones throughout the Russian interior. The French also captured numerous intact Russian supply dumps, which the Russians had failed to destroy or empty, and Moscow itself was filled with food.

The standard heavy wagons, well-suited for the dense and partially paved road networks of Germany and France, proved too cumbersome for the sparse and primitive Russian dirt tracks, further damaged by the unstable weather. Many horses also died during the march towards Vilnius through forests which lacked the necessary fodder, slowing even further the transport of supplies for Napoleon's troops. The supply route from Smolensk to Moscow was therefore entirely dependent on light wagons with small loads. The problem was worsened by the ever-growing distance between supply dumps and Napoleon's excessive use of forced marches, which the wagoneers could not keep up with. The weather itself became an issue, where, according to historian Richard K. Riehn:

The thunderstorms of the 29th [of June] turned into other downpours, turning the tracks—some diarists claim there were no roads in Lithuania—into bottomless mires. Wagons sank up to their hubs; horses dropped from exhaustion; men lost their boots. Stalled wagons became obstacles that forced men around them and stopped supply wagons and artillery columns. Then came the sun, which would bake the deep ruts into canyons of concrete, where horses would break their legs and wagons their wheels.

Jean-François Boulart reported:

Then on 29 June came a fresh and awful and extraordinary storm; such a terrible tempest had not been known in the memory of man. Thunder and lightning burst forth from every side of the horizon; soldiers were struck dead; torrents of rain flooded the bivouacs; the downpour lasted all the next day.

The heavy losses to disease, hunger and desertion in the early months of the campaign were in large part due to the inability to transport provisions quickly enough to the troops. The intendance (central military administration) routinely failed to distribute with sufficient rigor the supplies that were built up or captured. These flaws meant that despite Napoleon's careful planning, the Grande Armée never attained complete self-sufficiency.

Inadequate supplies also played a key role in the losses suffered by the army. Davidov and other Russian campaign participants record wholesale surrenders of starving members of the Grande Armée even before the onset of the frosts. Caulaincourt describes men swarming over and cutting up horses that slipped and fell, even before the horse had been killed. Other accounts describe eating the flesh of horses still walking, too cold to react in pain; drinking blood and preparing black pudding was popular. The French were simply unable to feed their army. Starvation led to a general loss of cohesion and discipline. Constant harassment of the French Army by Cossacks added to the losses during the retreat.

Though starvation caused horrendous casualties in Napoleon's army, losses arose from other sources as well. The main body of Napoleon's Grande Armée diminished by a third in just the first eight weeks of the campaign, before any major battle was fought. This loss in strength was in part due to diseases such as diphtheria, dysentery and typhus and the need for garrison supply centres. There are eyewitness reports of cannibalism in November 1812.

=== Combat service and support and medicine ===
Nine pontoon companies, three pontoon trains with 100 pontoons each, two companies of marines, nine sapper companies, six miner companies and an engineer park were deployed for the invasion force. Large-scale military hospitals were created at Breslau, Warsaw, Thorn, Marienburg, Elbing and Danzig, while hospitals in East Prussia (Königsberg), had beds for 28,000. The main hospital was in Vilnius, another was set up in Hlybokaye.

=== Ammunition ===
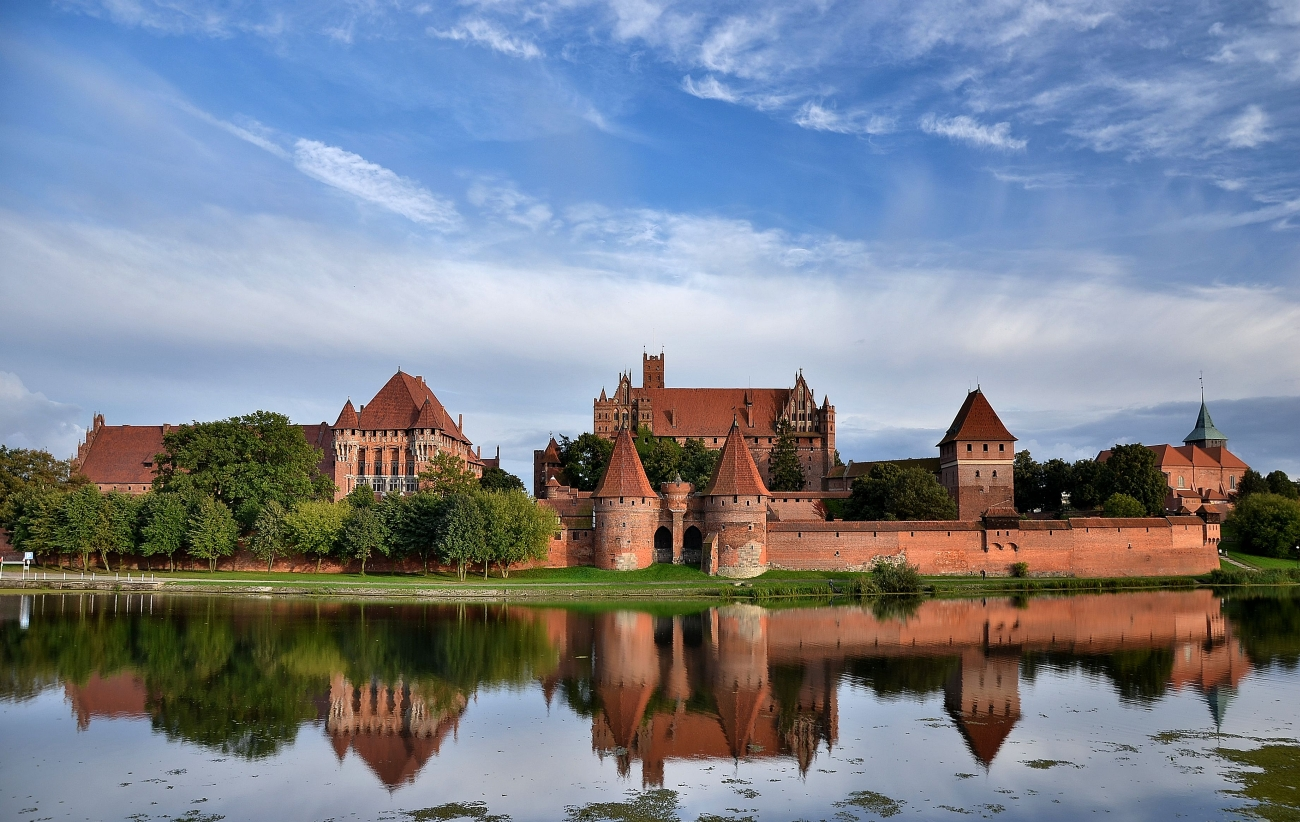
Napoleon stopped at Castle Malbork, a large military warehouse

A significant arsenal was established in Warsaw, forming a crucial part of the logistical infrastructure. The distribution of artillery was concentrated across strategic locations at Magdeburg, Küstrin, Stettin, Danzig, and Glogau.

- Magdeburg contained a siege artillery train housing 100 heavy guns and storing 462 cannons, two million paper cartridges and 300,000 pounds/135 tonnes of gunpowder;
- Danzig had a siege train with 130 heavy guns and 300,000 pounds of gunpowder;
- Stettin contained 263 guns, a million cartridges and 200,000 pounds/90 tonnes of gunpowder;
- Küstrin contained 108 guns and a million cartridges;
- Glogau contained 108 guns, a million cartridges and 100,000 pounds/45 tonnes of gunpowder.

Modlin Fortress near Warsaw, Thorn and Malbork (Marienburg) served as vital ammunition and supply depots.

Troops gathered in Thorn, Königsberg, Wehlau, Insterburg, and Gumbinnen, where Napoleon arrived on 18 June. Meanwhile, Davout had ordered his I corps to pillage the town. The corps coming from Warsaw used the Suwałki Gap. Several corps, except X Corps, passed Marijampolė before arriving at the river Neman. On 23 June Napoleon arrived at Naugardiškė near Kaunas.

== Invasion ==
=== Crossing the Russian border ===
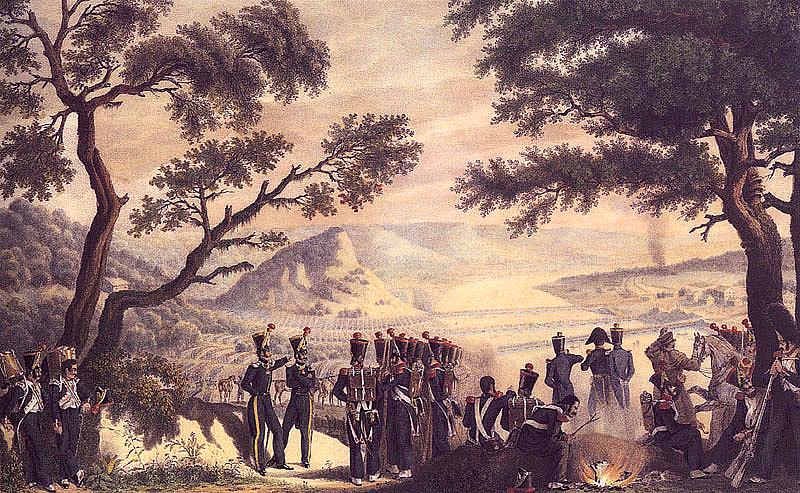
On the border of Neman 1812 by Christian Wilhelm von Faber du Faur

After two days of preparation, the invasion commenced on Wednesday, 24 June [O.S. 12 June] 1812 with Napoleon's army crossing the border. (Note: The "Grande Armée" is estimated between 450 and 600,000 soldiers, half of them foreigners. About 120,000 were young conscripts; 50,000 volunteers, perhaps 3,000 women and some children. A Dutch general noted that all commanders exaggerated the number of their soldiers to appear more impressive.) The army was split up into five columns:

1. The left wing under Macdonald with the X Corps of 30,000 men (half of them Prussians) crossed the Neman at Tilsit on the 24th. He moved north in Courland but did not succeed in occupying Riga. Early August he occupied Dunaburg; early September he returned to Riga with his entire force. On 18 December, a few days after the French left the Russian Empire, he drew back to Königsberg, followed by Peter Wittgenstein. On 25 December, one of his generals Yorck von Wartenburg found himself isolated because the Russian army blocked the road. After five days he was urged by his officers (and in the presence of Carl von Clausewitz), at least to accept neutralization of his troops and an armistice. Yorck's resolution had enormous consequences.
2. In the evening of 23 June, Morand, accompanied by sappers, occupied the other side of the Neman. Around noon the next morning, Napoleon, followed by the Imperial Guard (47,000), crossed the river on one of the three pontoon bridges nearby Napoleon's Hill. Afterwards, Murat's cavalry and three corps crossed the river destined for Vilnius. Then they followed Barclay de Tolly's 1st Western Army to Drissa and Polotsk.
  - The cavalry corps of Murat (32,000) advanced to Vilnius and Polotsk in the vanguard.
  - The I Corps of Davout (72,000), the strongest corps, left Vilnius on 1 July and occupied Minsk a week later. Davout's goal was to cut off Pyotr Bagration from Barclay de Tolly. He had already lost a third of his men when he engaged Bagration, but defeated the Russians at Mogilev and then went to Smolensk, where he joined the main army.
  - The II Corps of Oudinot (37,000) crossed the Neman and the Viliya to combat Peter Wittgenstein, who protected the road to St Petersburg. Oudinot did not succeed in joining up with Macdonald, and instead joined the VI Corps. For two months, these corps kept Wittgenstein at a distance until the Second Battle of Polotsk.
  - The III Corps of Ney (39,000) defended the 4th pontoon bridge at Aleksotas which could be used to escape; Ney then went to Polotsk. The Second Central force crossed at Piliuona 20 km upstream.
  - The IV Corps of Beauharnais (45,000 Italians) crossed the Neman near Piliuona. Napoleon's stepson had orders to avoid Vilnius on his way to Vitebsk.
  - The VI Corps of St. Cyr (25,000 Bavarians) crossed at Piliuona. St. Cyr was to throw himself between the two Russian armies and cut off all communication between them. He followed the II Corps to Polotsk, forming the northern flank. Neither corps ever saw Moscow. With French forces moving through different routes in the direction of Polotsk and Vitebsk, the first major engagement took place on 25 July at the Battle of Ostrovno.
3. The right flank force under Napoleon's brother Jérôme Bonaparte, King of Westphalia (62,000), crossed the Neman near Grodno on 1 July, and moved towards Bagration's 2nd Western Army. It seems the force was advancing slowly so the stragglers could catch up. On Napoleon's order, Davout secretly took over the command of the right flank on 6 July. The Battle of Mir was a tactical victory for the Russians; Jérôme let Platov escape by deploying too few of Józef Poniatowski's troops. Jérôme left the army after being criticised by Davout. He went home at the end of July, taking a small guard battalion with him.
  - The IV Cavalry Corps of Latour Maubourg (8,000) joined Davout.
  - The V Corps (36,000 Poles) under Poniatowski joined Davout and went to Mogilev and Smolensk. Polish legions, including Lithuanians, formed the largest foreign contingent.
  - The VIII Corps (17,000 Westphalians) were led by Vandamme, who was sent home in early July. Jérôme Bonaparte took over, but resigned on 15 July when he found out Davout had been secretly given the command of his forces. In early August, the command was given to Junot. In the Battle of Smolensk (1812), Junot was sent to bypass the left flank of the Russian army, but he got lost and was unable to carry out this operation. Junot, a heavy drinker, was blamed for allowing the Russian army to retreat arriving too late at the Battle of Valutino. After the Battle of Borodino, Junot had only 2,000 men left.
4. The right or southern wing under Schwarzenberg, with the XII Corps of 34,000 Austrians, crossed the Western Bug on a pontoon bridge at Drohiczyn on 2 July. Tormasov's 3rd Reserve Army of Observation prevented him from joining up with Davout. When Tormasov occupied Brest (Belarus) at the end of July, Schwarzenberg and Reynier were cut off from supplies. On 18 September, the Austrians withdrew when Pavel Chichagov arrived from the south and seized Minsk. On 14 December 1812 Schwarzenberg crossed the border.
  - The VII Corps of Reynier (17,000 Saxons) stayed in the Grodno region and cooperated with Schwarzenberg to protect the Duchy of Warsaw against Tormasov.
5. During the campaign, reinforcements of 80,000 and the baggage trains with 30,000 men were sent on different dates. In November, the division of Durutte assisted Reynier. In December, Loison was sent to help extricate the remnants of the Grand Army in its retreat. Within a few days many of Loison's unexperienced soldiers died of the extreme cold. Napoleon arrested him for not marching with his division to the front.
  - Of the IX Corps of Victor (33,000), the majority was sent to Smolensk in early September; Victor took over command from St. Cyr. At the end of October, he retreated, losing significant supplies in Vitebsk to Wittgenstein. Victor and H.W. Daendels were ordered to cover the retreat to the Berezina.
  - The XI Corps of Augereau was part of the reserve. It was created in the late summer. It contained an entire division of reformed deserters. This corps, based in Poland, did not participate in military operations in Russia until November/December. Augereau also had at his disposal a Danish contingent of about 10,000 men under General Ewald, intended for service with XI Corps during the Russian campaign, which remained in Holstein for the duration of the campaign. Augereau never left Berlin; his younger brother general Jean-Pierre and his troops were compelled to surrender to the partisans Aleksandr Figner and Denis Davydov on 9 November.

=== March on Vilnius ===
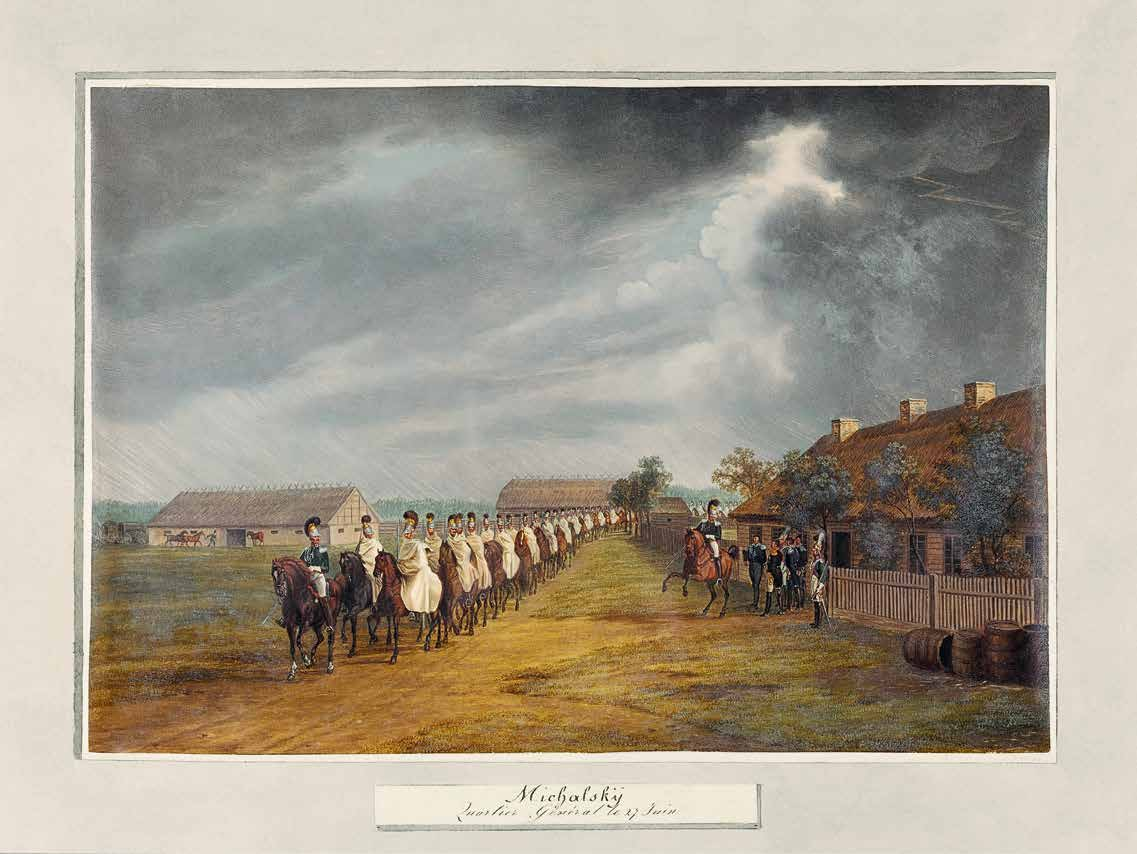
27 June 1812. Quartier Général at Mykoliškiai

Napoleon initially met little resistance and moved quickly into the enemy's territory in spite of the difficulties in transporting more than 1,100 cannons. But the roads in this area of Lithuania proved to be little more than small dirt tracks and footpaths through areas of birched woodland and marshes. With wagons struggling to move over the uneven surface and the troops moving too quickly, food and drink were not properly distributed.

On 25 June, Murat's reserve cavalry provided the vanguard with Napoleon, the Imperial Guard, and Davout's 1st Corps following behind. Napoleon spent the night and the next day in Kaunas, allowing only his guards, not even the generals, to enter the city. The next day he rushed towards the capital of Vilnius, pushing the infantry forward in columns that suffered from stifling heat and heavy rain. The central group marched 110 kilometres (70 mi) in two days. Ney's III Corps marched down the road to Sudervė, with Oudinot marching on the other side of the Viliya river.

Since the end of April, the Russian headquarters had been centred in Vilnius, but on June 24 couriers rushed news about the crossing of the Neman to Barclay de Tolley. Orders were immediately sent out to Bagration and Platov, who commanded the Cossacks, to take the offensive. Balashov left Vilnius on June 26, and Barclay assumed overall command.

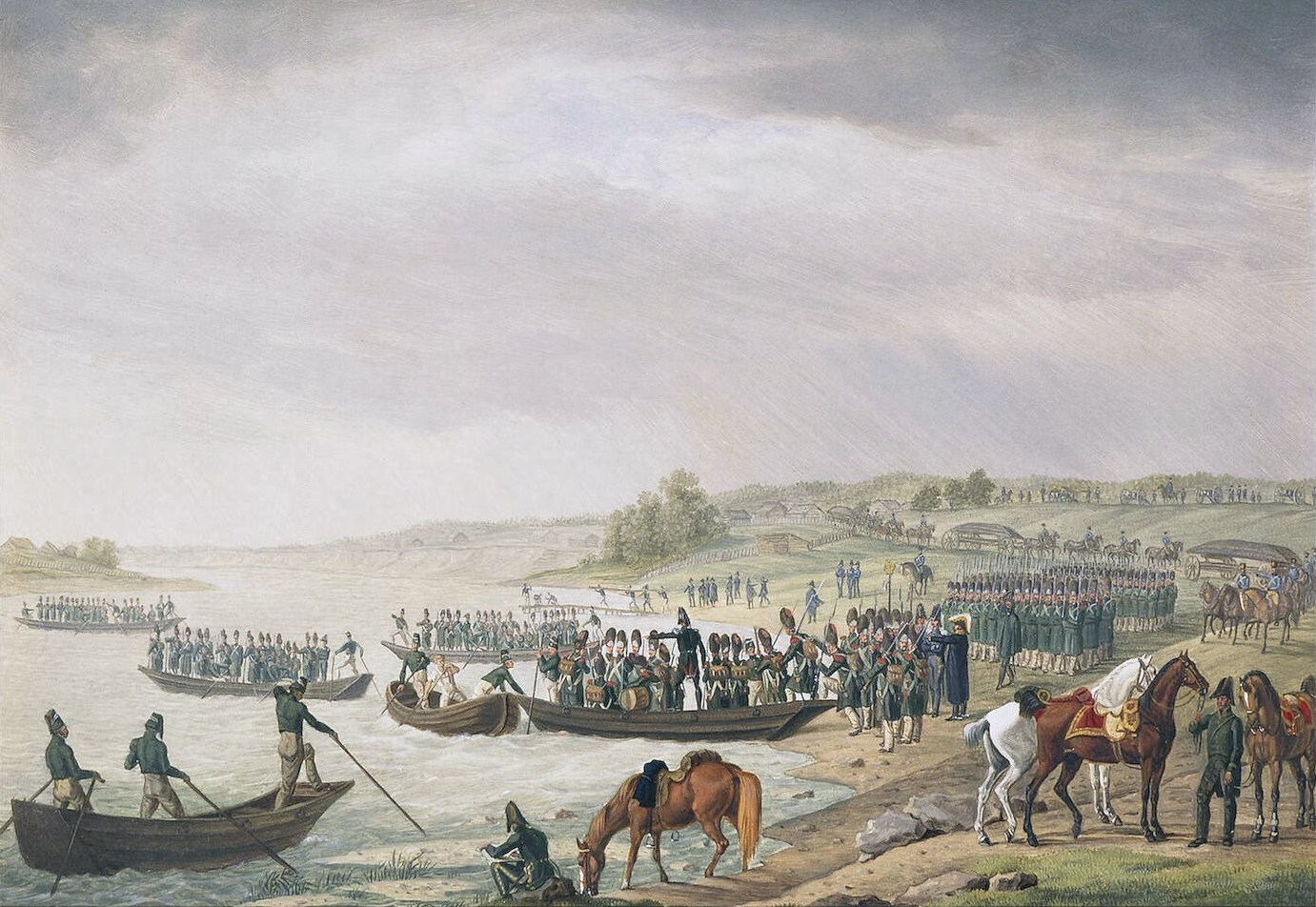
Italian corps of Eugène de Beauharnais crossing the Neman on 30 June 1812

Napoleon reached Vilnius on 28 June with only light skirmishing but leaving more than 5,000 dead horses in his wake. The lack of horses to transport food supplies meant that he was forced to abandon up to 100 guns and up to 500 artillery wagons. Napoleon expected that Balashov would sue for peace at this point, but was to be disappointed. Balashov demanded that the French return across the Neman before negotiations could begin. Barclay continued to retreat to Drissa, deciding that the concentration of the 1st and 2nd armies was his priority.

Several days after crossing the Neman, a number of French soldiers began to develop high fevers and a red rash on their bodies, indicative of typhus. On 29/30 June, a violent thunderstorm struck Lithuania during the night and continued for several hours or a day.

The results were most disastrous to the French forces. The movement of troops was impeded or absolutely checked and the vast troop and supply trains on the Vilnius-Kaunas Road became disorganized. The existing roads became little better than quagmires causing the horses to break down under the additional strain. The delay and frequent loss of these supply trains caused both troops and horses to suffer. Napoleon's forces traditionally were well supplied by his transportation corps, but they proved inadequate during the invasion.

Foraging in Lithuania proved hard, as the land was mostly barren and forested. The army was able to forage fewer supplies than they had in Poland, and two days of forced marching made a bad supply situation worse. Central to the problem were the expanding distances to supply magazines and the fact that no supply wagon could keep up with a forced-marched infantry column. Some 50,000 stragglers and deserters became a lawless mob warring with the local peasantry in all-out guerrilla war, which further hindered supplies reaching the Grande Armée.

A Lieutenant Mertens—a Württemberger serving with Ney's III Corps—reported in his diary that oppressive heat followed by cold nights and rain left them with dead horses and camping in swamp-like conditions with dysentery and fever raging through the ranks, with hundreds in a field hospital that had to be set up for the purpose. He reported the times, dates and places of events, reporting new thunderstorms on 6 July and men dying of sunstroke a few days later. Napoleon's strategy proved to be a mistake: forced marches wore out the men and sapped their morale, leading to high rates of suicide, desertion, and death. The inability of the wagon trains to keep pace meant that supplies were taken on a first-come basis, and many soldiers only had spoiled food and water taken from dirty rivers and ponds to sustain themselves. This poor diet, coupled with bad hygiene and poor weather, allowed contagious diseases to spread and kill hundreds of men.

=== March on Vitebsk and Minsk ===
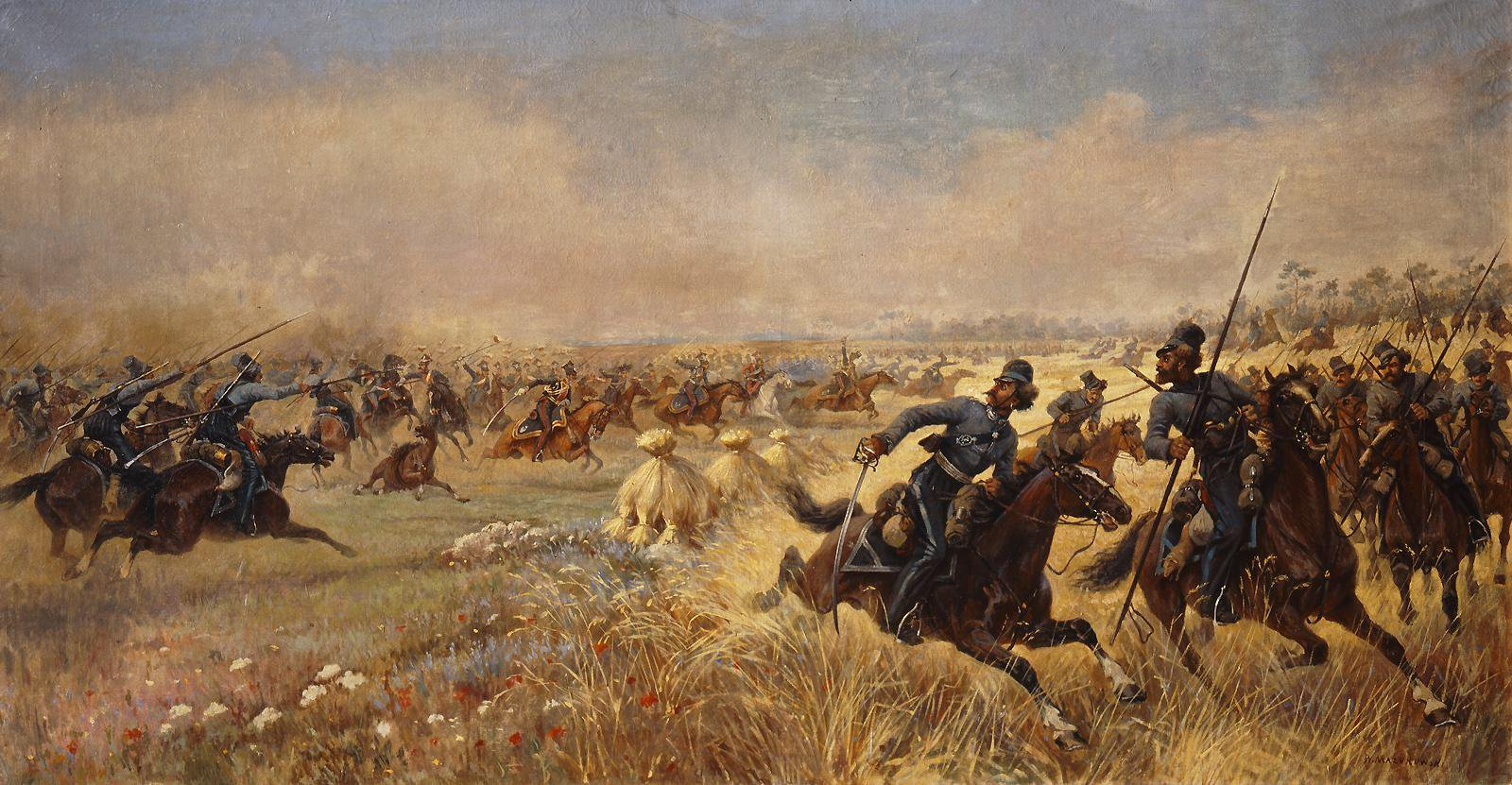
Cossacks feigning retreat against Polish uhlans at the Battle of Mir

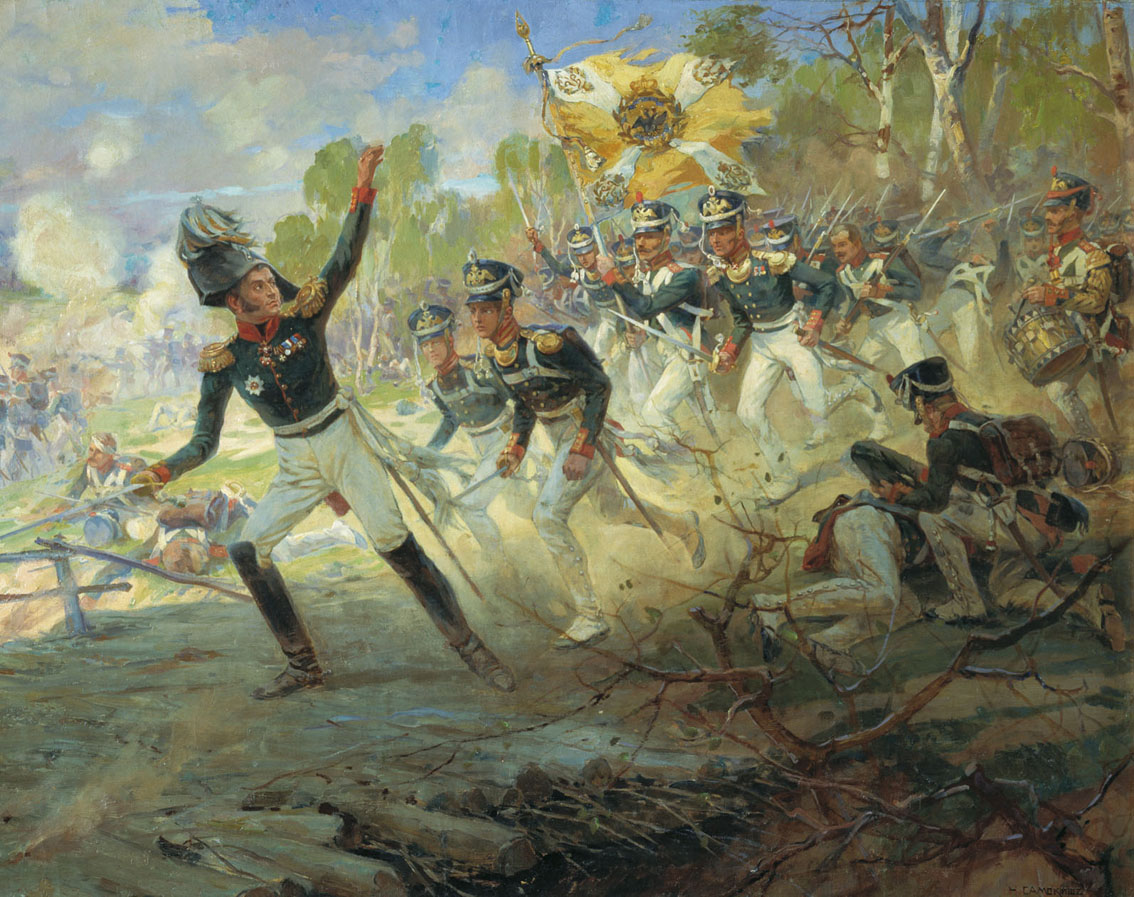
General Raevsky leading a detachment of the Russian Imperial Guard at the Battle of Saltanovka

Although Barclay wanted to give battle, he assessed it as a hopeless situation, and ordered Vilnius' magazines burned and its bridge dismantled. Wittgenstein moved his command to Klaipėda, passing beyond Macdonald and Oudinot's operations with Wittgenstein's rear guard clashing with Oudinot's forward elements. Barclay continued his retreat and, with the exception of the occasional rearguard clash, remained unhindered in his movements ever further east.

The French operation intended to split Bagration's forces from Barclay's forces by driving to Vilnius had cost the French forces 25,000 losses from all causes in only a few days. Strong probing operations were advanced from Vilnius towards Nemenčinė, Molėtai in the north and Ashmyany in the east, the location of Bagration on his way to Minsk. Bagration ordered Platov and Dokhturov to distract the enemy.

Murat advanced to Nemenčinė on July 1, running into elements of Dmitry Dokhturov's III Russian Cavalry Corps. Napoleon assumed this was Bagration's 2nd Army and rushed out, before being told it was not. Napoleon then attempted to use Davout, Jerome, and Eugene in a hammer and anvil to catch Bagration and to destroy the 2nd Army before it could reach Minsk.

Conflicting orders and lack of information had almost placed Bagration in a bind marching into Davout; however, Jerome could not arrive in time over the same mud tracks, supply problems, and weather that had so badly affected the rest of the Grande Armée. Command disputes between Jerome, Vandamme and Davout did not help the situation.

In the first two weeks of July, the Grande Armée lost 100,000 men due to sickness and desertion. On 8 July, Dirk van Hogendorp was appointed as Governor of Lithuania, organizing hospitals for the wounded in Vilnius and supplies for the army; Louis Henri Loison was appointed in Königsberg. The main problem was forage from East Prussia. For three weeks, the Dutch soldiers had hardly seen bread and only eaten soup.

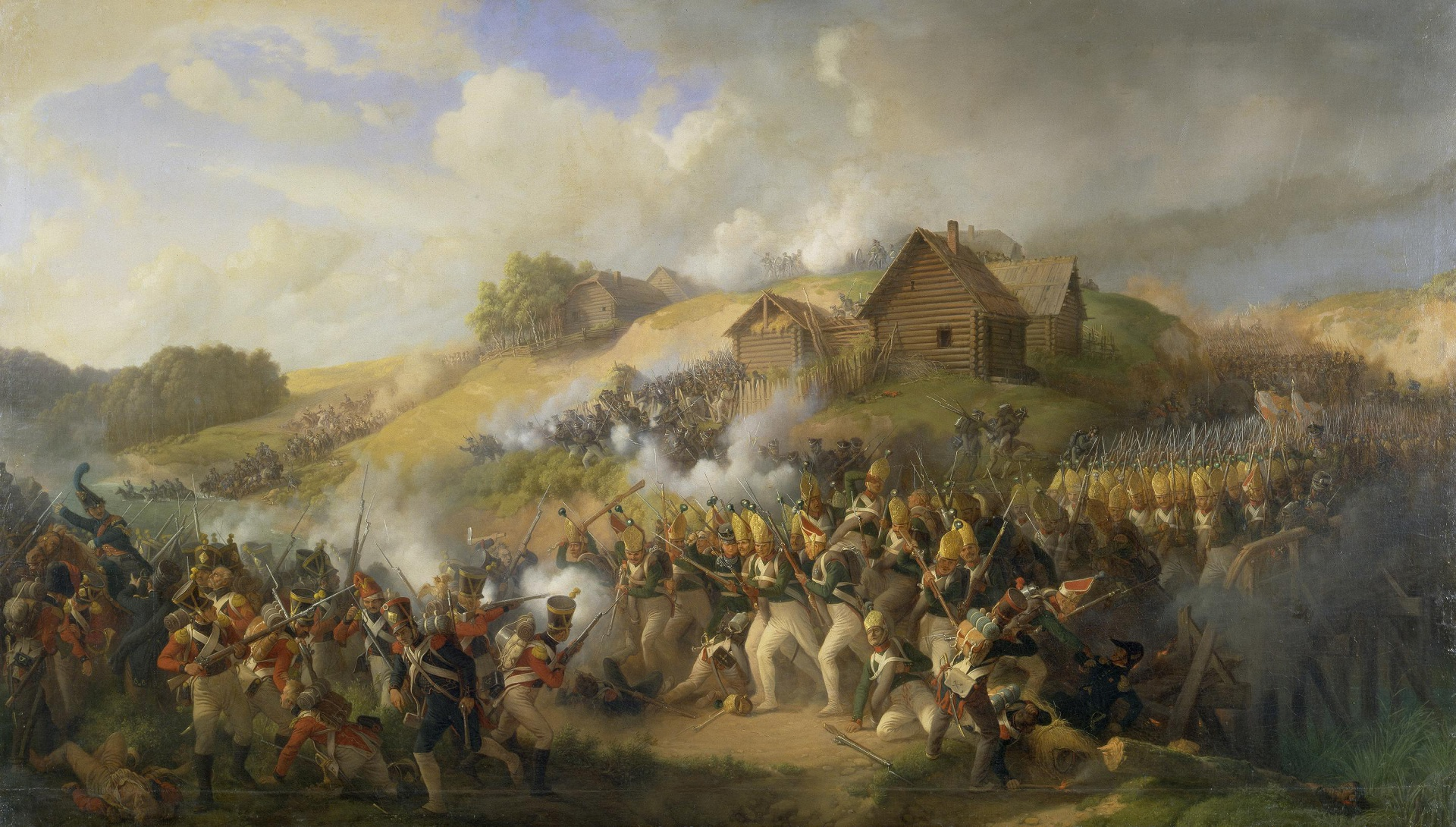
The Battle of Klyastitsy stopped the French offensive on St. Petersburg

Davout had lost 10,000 men marching to Minsk, which he reached on July 8th, and would not attack Bagration without Jerome joining him. He ordered Polish cavalry to search for the thousands of looting soldiers who stayed behind. Davout left the city after four days when a Polish governor was appointed; Joseph Barbanègre had to organize the logistics. Davout crossed the Berezina and ran into the Battle of Mogilev with Bagration; he went to Orsha, and crossed the Dniepr on his way to Smolensk. Davout thought Bagration had some 60,000 men and Bagration thought Davout had 70,000. Unbeknownst to Barclay, Bagration was getting orders from both Alexander's staff and Barclay, and left Bagration without a clear picture of what was expected of him and the general situation. This stream of confused orders to Bagration had him upset with Barclay, which would have repercussions later.

After five weeks, the loss of troops from disease and desertion had reduced Napoleon's effective fighting strength to about half. Ney and his corps were given ten days to recover and search for food. Jakob Walter describes his foraging experience during Russia's scorched earth tactics:

Finally we arrived at Polotsk, a large city on the other side of the Western Dvina River. In this region I once left the bivouac to seek provisions. There were eight of us, and we came to a very distant village. Here we searched all the houses. There were no peasants left. I later realized how heedless I had been, since each one ran into a house alone, broke open everything that was covered, and searched all the floors and still nothing was found. Finally, when we assembled and were ready to leave, I once more inspected a little hut somewhat removed from the village. Around it from top to bottom were heaped bundles of hemp and shives, which I tore down; and, as I worked my way to the ground, sacks full of flour appeared. Now I joyfully called all my comrades so that we might dispose of the booty. In the village we saw sieves; these we took to sift the flour mixed with chaff an inch long; and, after that, we refilled the sacks. ... Then the question of carrying and dividing the grain arose, but it occurred to me that I had seen a horse in one of the houses. Everyone immediately hurried to find the horse. We found two instead of one, but unfortunately they were both colts, and one could not be used at all. We took the largest, placed two sacks on it, and started out very slowly. While we were marching there, the Russians saw us from a distance with this booty; and at the same moment we saw a troop of peasants in the valley, about fifty. These ran toward us. What could we do but shoot at them?

=== March on Smolensk ===
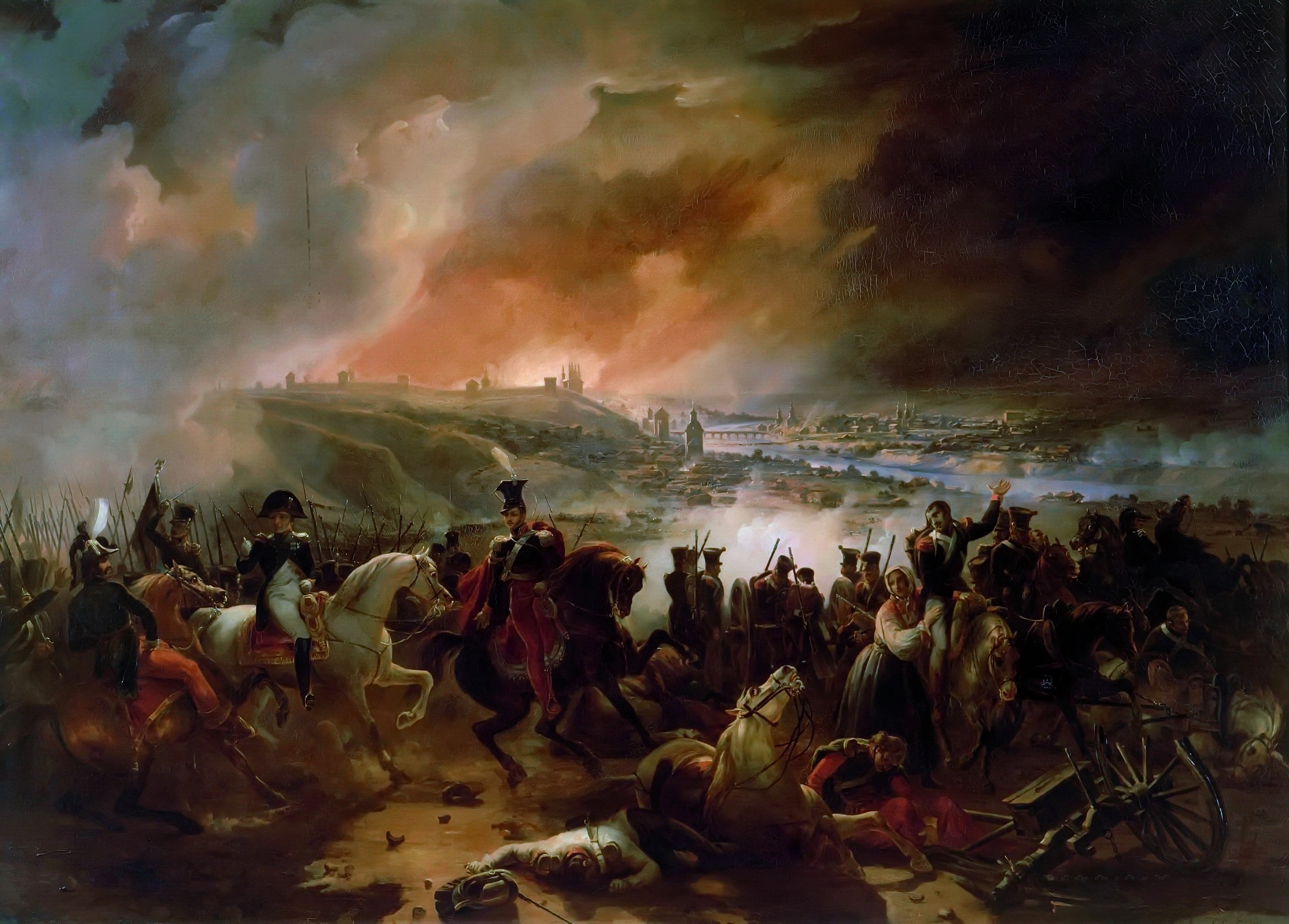
The Battle of Smolensk by Jean-Charles Langlois. Napoleon and Poniatowski with the burning city of Smolensk

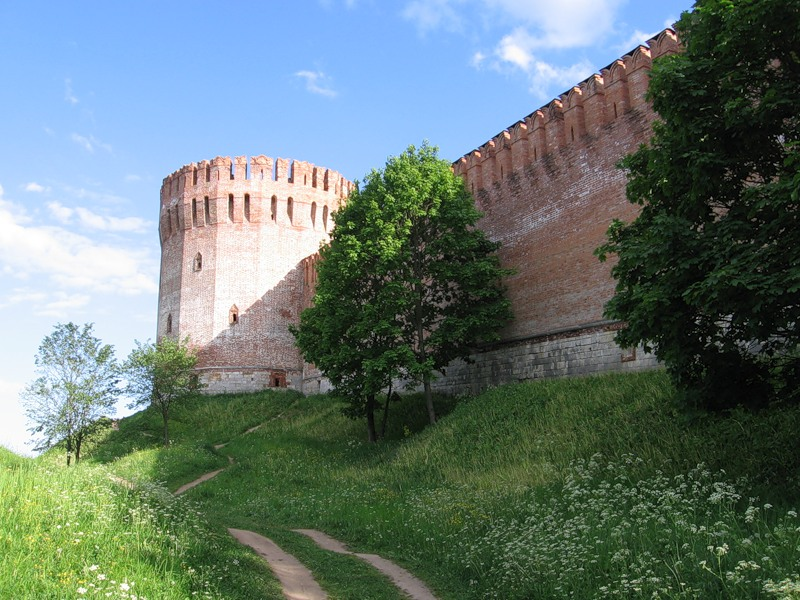
The total length of the city wall around the Smolensk Kremlin was 6.5 kilometres, with a height of up to 19 metres and a width of up to 5.2 metres, and a total of 38 watchtowers. The Kremlin lost nine towers because of the bombardment and fire.

Exactly at midnight on July 16, Napoleon left Vilnius. On 19 July the Tsar left the army in Polotsk and headed for Moscow, taking the discredited Von Phull with him. (Note: Karl Ludwig von Phull was responsible for the initial plan for the defence of Russia - the retreat to the fortified camp at Drissa.) Barclay, the Russian commander-in-chief, refused to fight despite Bagration's urgings. Several times he attempted to establish a strong defensive position, but each time the French advance was too quick for him to finish preparations, and he was forced to retreat once more. When the French Army progressed further (under conditions of extreme heat and drought, rivers and wells filled with carrion) it encountered serious problems in foraging, aggravated by the scorched earth tactics of the Russian forces.

From Smolensk to Moshaisk, the war displayed its horrible work of destruction: all the roads, fields, and woods lay as though sown with people, horses, wagons, burned villages and cities; everything looked like the complete ruin of all that lived. In particular, we saw ten dead Russians to one of our men, although every day our numbers fell off considerably.

After the battle of Vitebsk Napoleon discovered that the Russians were able to slip away during the night. The city, at the intersection of important trade routes, and the palace of Alexander of Württemberg would be Napoleon's base for the next two weeks. His army needed to recover and rest, while Napoleon considered next steps.

According to Antoine-Henri Jomini, Napoleon planned not to go further than Smolensk and make Vilnius his headquarters for the winter. However, he could not go back at the end of July. His position was unfavourable, according to Adam Zamoyski, made so by the heat—even at night—and the lack of supplies. He had lost a third of his army due to sickness and straggling. The Russo-Turkish War (1806–1812) had come to an end as Kutuzov signed the Treaty of Bucharest and the Russian general Pavel Chichagov headed north-west. Napoleon's former ally Bernadotte broke off relations with France and entered into an alliance with Russia (Treaty of Örebro). Mid-July, Napoleon's brother Jérome resigned and decided to go home. For Napoleon, he lost the opportunity to keep the Russian army under Bagration separated in the south.

On 14 August, the French army crossed the Dniepr, and Ney and Murat won the first Battle of Krasnoi. The next day Napoleon celebrated his 43rd birthday with a review of the army. In the morning of the 16th, Murat's cavalry and Ney's infantry closed up to the western side of Smolensk. The main body of the army did not come up until late in the afternoon. The corps of Barclay and Bagration finally succeeded in uniting in Smolensk and held a council of war. Under pressure, Barclay de Tolly decided to launch an offensive.

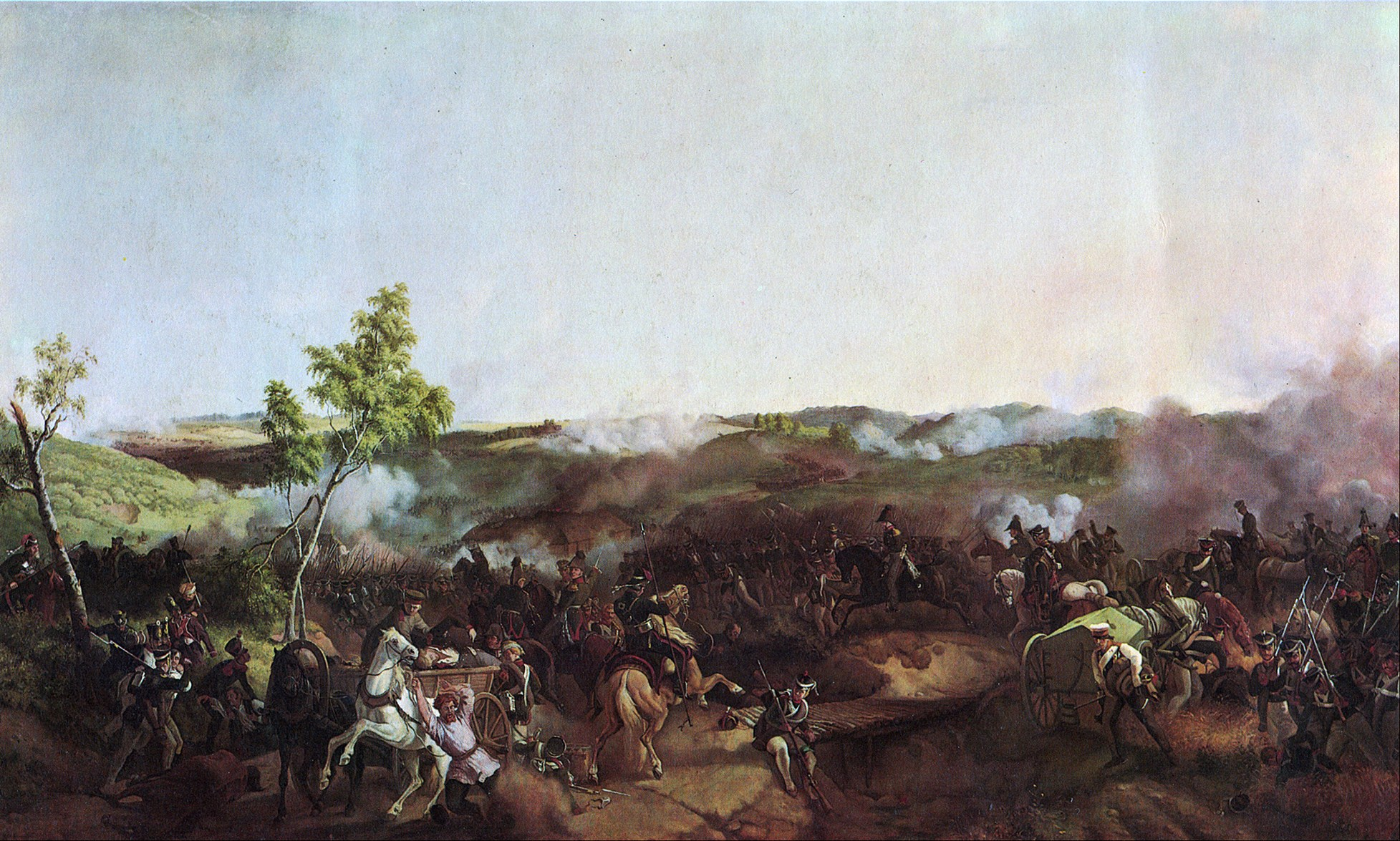
The Battle of Valutino on 19 August 1812

The Battle of Smolensk (1812) on August 16–18 became the first real confrontation of significant forces. Napoleon surrounded the southern bank of the Dniepr, while the northern bank was guarded by Barclay's army. When Bagration moved further east, to prevent the French from crossing the river and attacking the Russians from behind, Napoleon began the attack on the Smolensk Kremlin. In the middle of the night, Barclay de Tolly withdrew his troops from the burning city to avoid a large confrontation with no chance of victory. When the French army moved in, the Russians left to the east. Ney, Junot and Oudinot tried to halt the Russian's retreat. The Battle of Valutino could have been decisive, but the Russians succeeded in their escape via a diversion on the road to Moscow.

The French discussed their options to prepare for a new attack after winter, but Napoleon pressed his army on after the Russians. Murat implored him to stop, but Napoleon was intent on reaching Moscow. After five or six days, Napoleon invited the wounded general Tuchkov to write to the tsar about Napoleon's readiness for peace negotiations, and then the general was sent to Paris as an honorary prisoner. On 24 August, the Grande Armée marched out on the Old Smolensk Road, 30 feet wide; Eugene on the left, Poniatowski on the right, and Murat in the centre, with the Emperor, the Guard, I Corps and III Corps in the second line. Joseph Barbanègre was appointed commander of the devastated city and had to organise new supplies.

Kutuzov in command

Meanwhile, Wittgenstein was forced to retreat to the north after the First Battle of Polotsk. Bagration asked Aleksey Arakcheyev to organize the militia, as Barclay had led the French right into the capital. Political pressure on Barclay to give battle and the general's continuing reluctance to do so led to his removal after the defeat. On 20 August Barclay was replaced in his position as commander-in-chief by the popular veteran Mikhail Kutuzov. The former head of the St. Petersburg militia and a member of the State Council, Kutuzov arrived on the 29th at the border village Tsaryovo-Zaymishche. (Note: On the day before he left the capital he met with Madame de Stael, one of Napoleon's main opponents. A few weeks earlier she also had visited Miloradovich and Rostopchin the governors of Kiev and Moscow.) The weather was still unbearably hot, and Kutuzov continued Barclay's successful strategy, using attrition warfare instead of risking the army in an open battle. The Russian Army fell back ever deeper into Russia's empty and forested interior as Napoleon continued to move east. Unable because of political pressure to give up Moscow without a fight, Kutuzov took up a defensive position some 120 kilometres (75 mi) before Moscow at Borodino.

=== Battle of Borodino ===
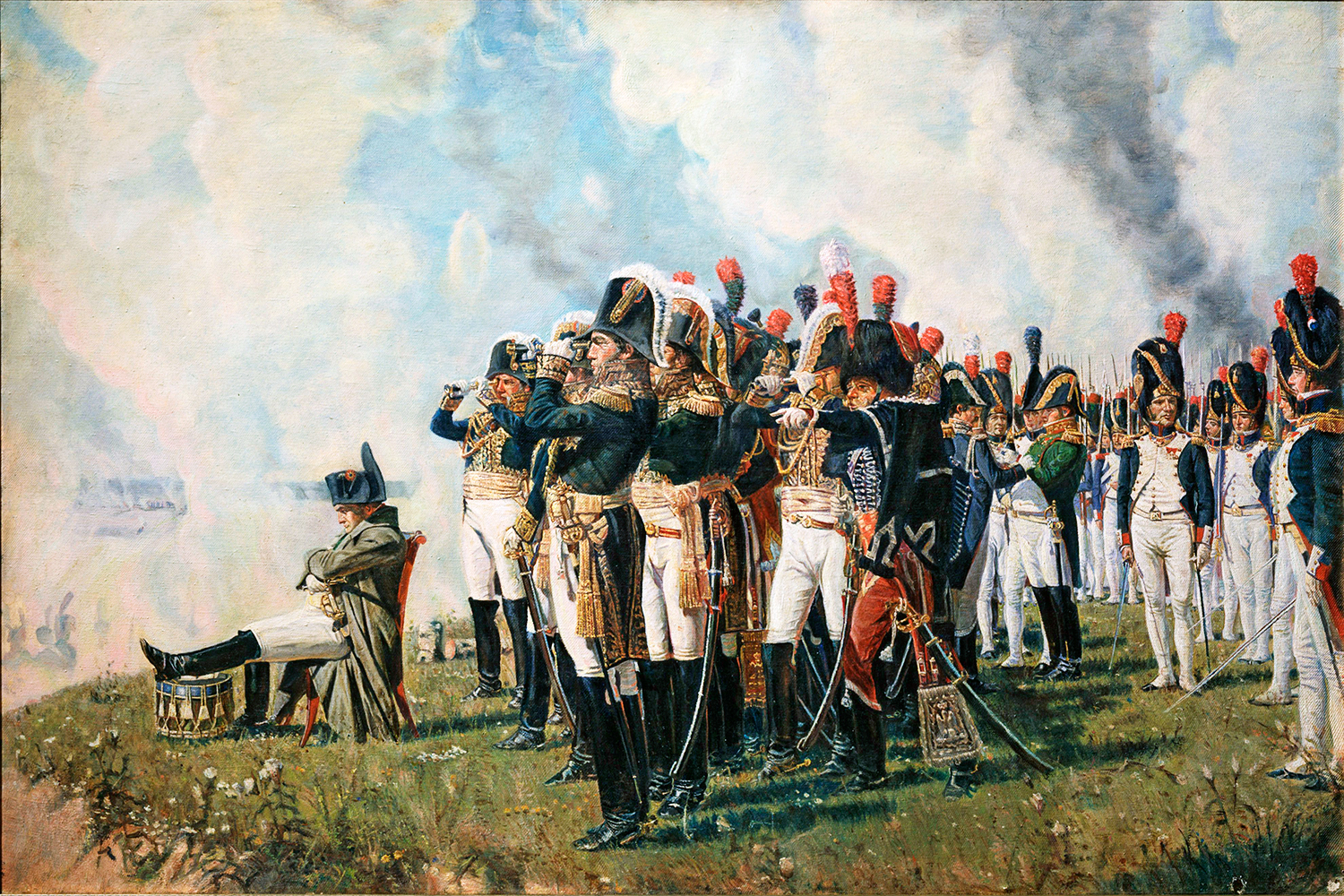
Napoleon and his staff at the battle

The Battle of Borodino, fought on 7 September 1812, was the largest battle of the French invasion of Russia, involving more than 250,000 troops and causing at least 70,000 casualties. The Grande Armée attacked the Imperial Russian Army near the village of Borodino, west of the town of Mozhaysk, and eventually captured the main positions on the battlefield, but failed to destroy the Russian army. About a third of Napoleon's soldiers were killed or wounded; Russian losses, while heavier, could be replaced, unlike the invading French army's.

The battle ended with the Russian Army, while out of position, still offering resistance. The state of exhaustion of the French forces and the lack of recognition of the state of the Russian Army led Napoleon to remain on the battlefield with his army, instead of engaging in the forced pursuit that had marked other campaigns that he had conducted. The entirety of the Guard was still available to Napoleon, and in refusing to use it he lost this singular chance to destroy the Russian Army. Borodino was a pivotal point in the campaign, as it was the last offensive action fought by Napoleon in Russia. By withdrawing, the Russian Army preserved its combat strength.

Borodino was the bloodiest day of battle in the Napoleonic Wars. The day after the battle, on September 8, the Russian Army could muster only half its strength. Kutuzov chose to act in accordance with his scorched-earth tactics and retreat, leaving the road to Moscow open, and ordering the evacuation of the city.

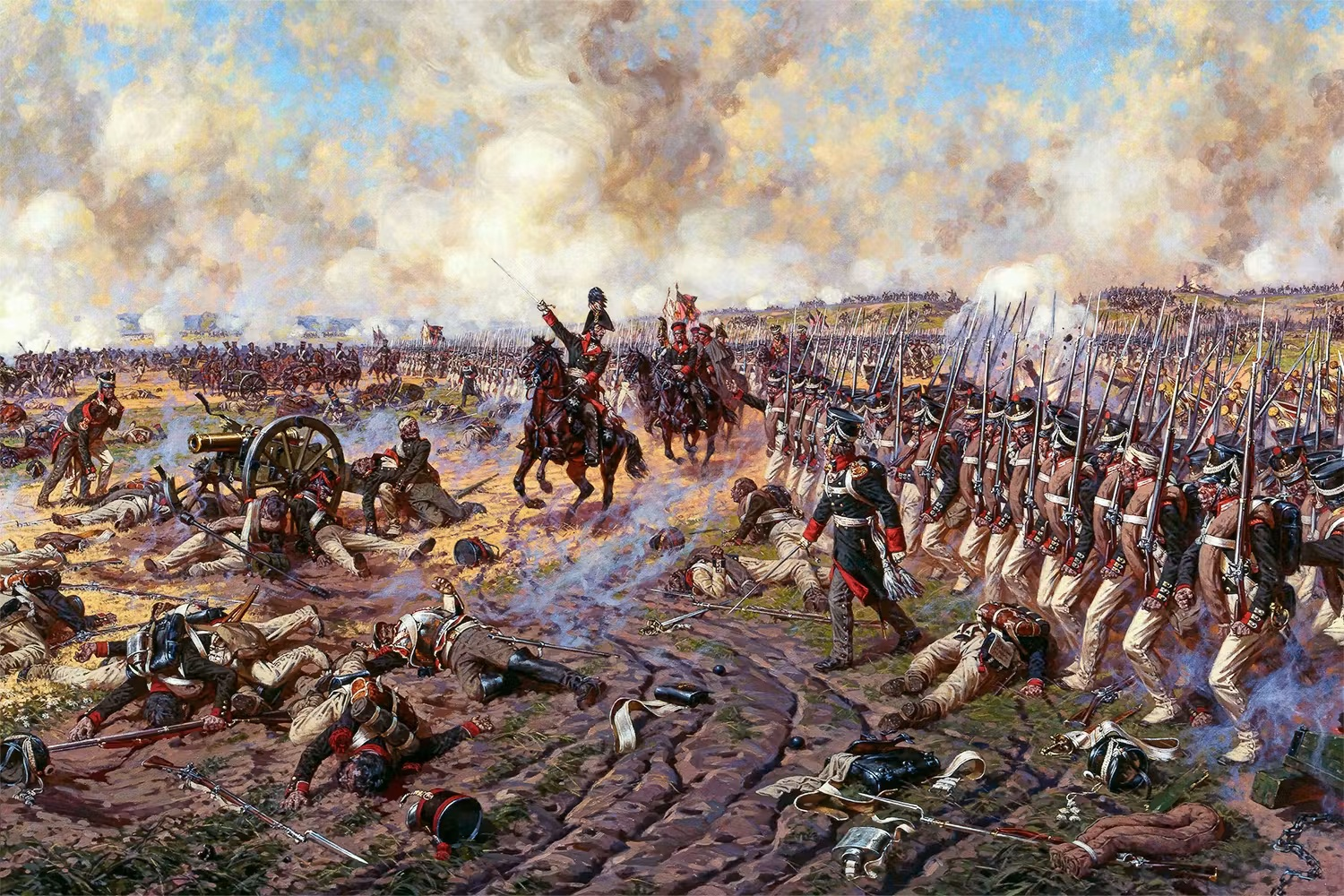
Pyotr Bagration giving orders at the battle

By this point the Russians had managed to draft large numbers of reinforcements (volunteers) into the army, bringing the Russian army to their peak 1812 strength of 904,000, with perhaps 100,000 in the vicinity of Moscow.

Both armies began to move and rebuild. The Russian retreat was significant for two reasons: firstly, the move was to the south and not the east; secondly, the Russians immediately began operations that would continue to deplete the French forces. Platov, commanding the rear guard on September 8, offered such strong resistance that Napoleon remained on the Borodino field. On the following day, Miloradovich assumed command of the rear guard, adding his forces to the formation.

On 8 September, the Russian army began retreating east from Borodino and camped outside Mozhaysk. When the village of Mozhaysk was captured by the French on the 9th, the Grande Armée rested for two days to recover. Napoleon asked Berthier to send reinforcements from Smolensk to Moscow and from Minsk to Smolensk. The French Army began to move out on September 10, with an ill Napoleon not leaving until the 12th. Some 18,000 men were ordered in from Smolensk, and Marshal Victor's corps supplied another 25,000.

=== Capture of Moscow ===
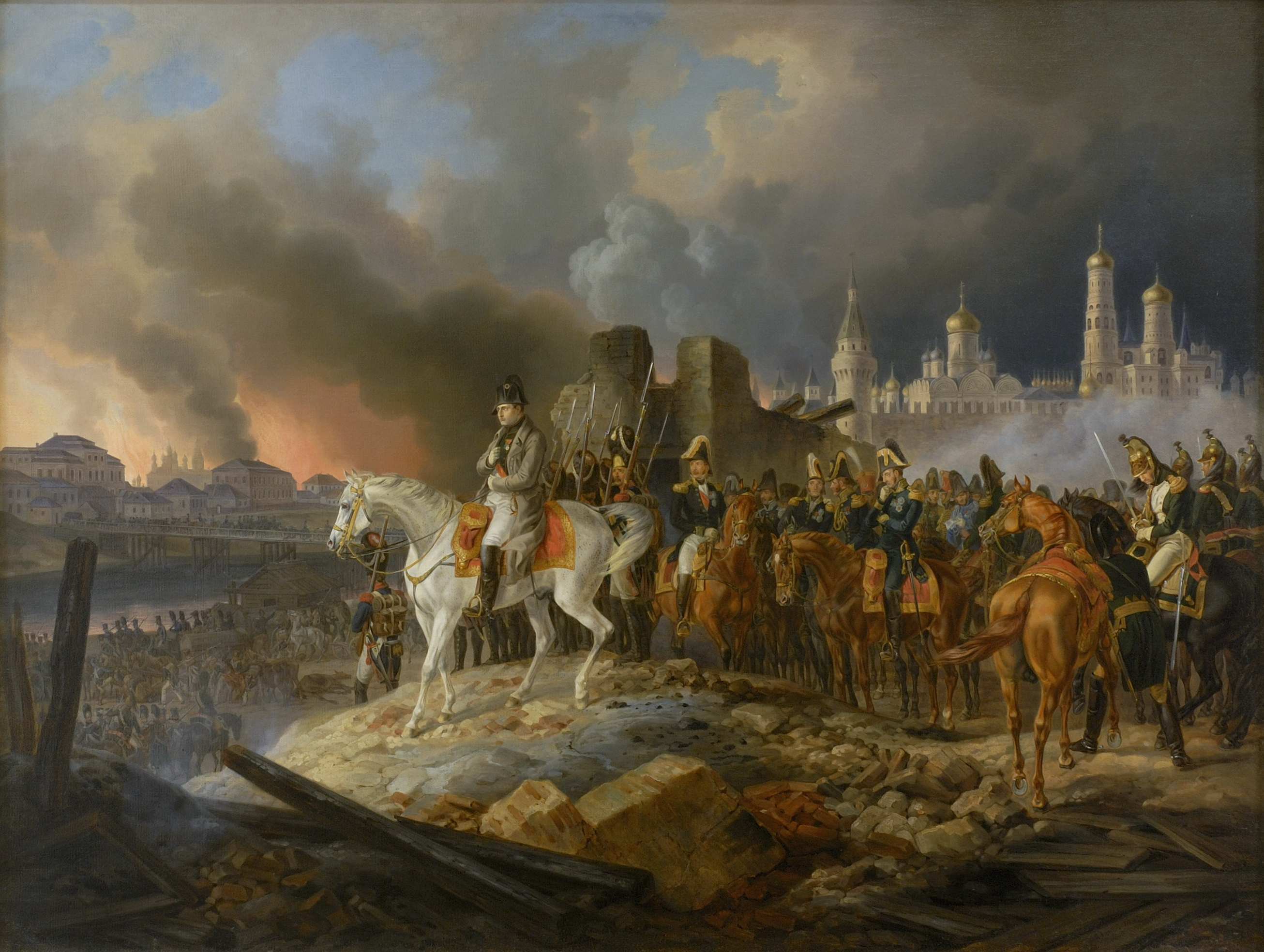
Napoleon watching the fire of Moscow in September 1812

On 10 September, the main quarter of the Russian Army was situated at Bolshiye Vyazyomy. Kutuzov settled in a Vyazyomy Manor on the high road to Moscow owned by Dmitry Golitsyn. The next day Tsar Alexander signed a document that Kutuzov was promoted General Field Marshal, the highest military rank of the Imperial Russian Army. Russian sources suggest Kutuzov wrote a number of orders and letters to Rostopchin, the Moscow military governor, about saving the city or the army. On 12 September [O.S. 31 August] 1812, the main forces of Kutuzov departed from the village, now Golitsyno and camped near Odintsovo, 20 km to the west, followed by Mortier and Joachim Murat's vanguard. Napoleon, who suffered from a cold and lost his voice, spent the night at Vyazyomy Manor (on the same sofa in the library as Kutuzov). On Sunday afternoon the Russian military council at Fili discussed the risks and agreed to abandon Moscow without fighting. Leo Tolstoy wrote Fyodor Rostopchin was invited also and explained the difficult decision in quite a few remarkable chapters in his book War and Peace. This came at the price of losing Moscow, whose population was evacuated. Miloradovich would not give up his rearguard duties until September 14, allowing Moscow to be evacuated. Miloradovich finally retreated under a flag of truce. Kutuzov withdrew to the southeast of Moscow.

On 14 September 1812, Napoleon moved into Moscow. However, he was surprised to have received no delegation from the city. Before the order was received to evacuate Moscow, the city had a population of approximately 270,000 people. 48 hours later three quarters of Moscow was reduced to ashes by arson. A French Army foot soldier recalled:

On the march into the city or rather on the march toward it, from a hill in a forest an hour and a half away, we saw the huge city lying before us. Clouds of fire, red smoke, great gilded crosses of the church towers glittered, shimmered, and billowed up toward us from the city... there were broad streets, long straight alleys, tall buildings massively built of brick, church towers with burned roofs and half-melted bells, and copper roofs which had rolled from the buildings; everything was uninhabited and uninhabitable.

Although Saint Petersburg was the political capital at that time, Moscow, which Napoleon had successfully occupied, was considered to be Russia's spiritual capital. The occupation led Alexander I to decide there was no way for France and Russia to peacefully coexist. On 19 September, Murat lost sight of Kutuzov, who changed direction and turned west to Podolsk and Tarutino where he would be more protected by the surrounding hills and the Nara river. On 3 October Kutuzov and his entire staff arrived at Tarutino and camped there for two weeks. He controlled the three-pronged roads from Obninsk to Kaluga and Medyn so that Napoleon could not turn south or southwest. This position not only allowed him to harass the French lines of communication but also stay in contact with the Russian forces under Tormasov and Chichagov, commander of the Army of the Danube. He was also well placed to watch over the workshops and arms factories in nearby Tula and Briansk.

Kutuzov's food supplies and reinforcements were mostly coming up through Kaluga from the fertile and populous southern provinces, his new deployment gave him every opportunity to feed his men and horses and rebuild their strength. He refused to attack; he was happy for Napoleon to stay in Moscow for as long as possible, avoiding complicated movements and manoeuvres.

Kutuzov avoided frontal battles involving large masses of troops in order to reinforce his army and to wait there for Napoleon's retreat. This tactic was sharply criticised by Chief of Staff Bennigsen and others, but also by Tsar Alexander. Barclay de Tolly interrupted his service for five months and settled in Nizhny Novgorod. Each side avoided the other and seemed no longer to wish to get into a fight. On 5 October, on order of Napoleon, the French ambassador Jacques Lauriston left Moscow to meet Kutuzov at his headquarters. Kutuzov agreed to meet, despite the orders of the Tsar. On 10 October, Murat complained to Belliard about the lack of food and fodder; each day he lost 200 men captured by Russians. On 18 October, at dawn during breakfast, Murat's camp in a forest was surprised by an attack by forces led by Bennigsen, known as Battle of Winkovo. Bennigsen was supported by Kutuzov from his headquarters at distance. Bennigsen asked Kutuzov to provide troops for the pursuit. However, Kutuzov refused.

=== Retreat ===
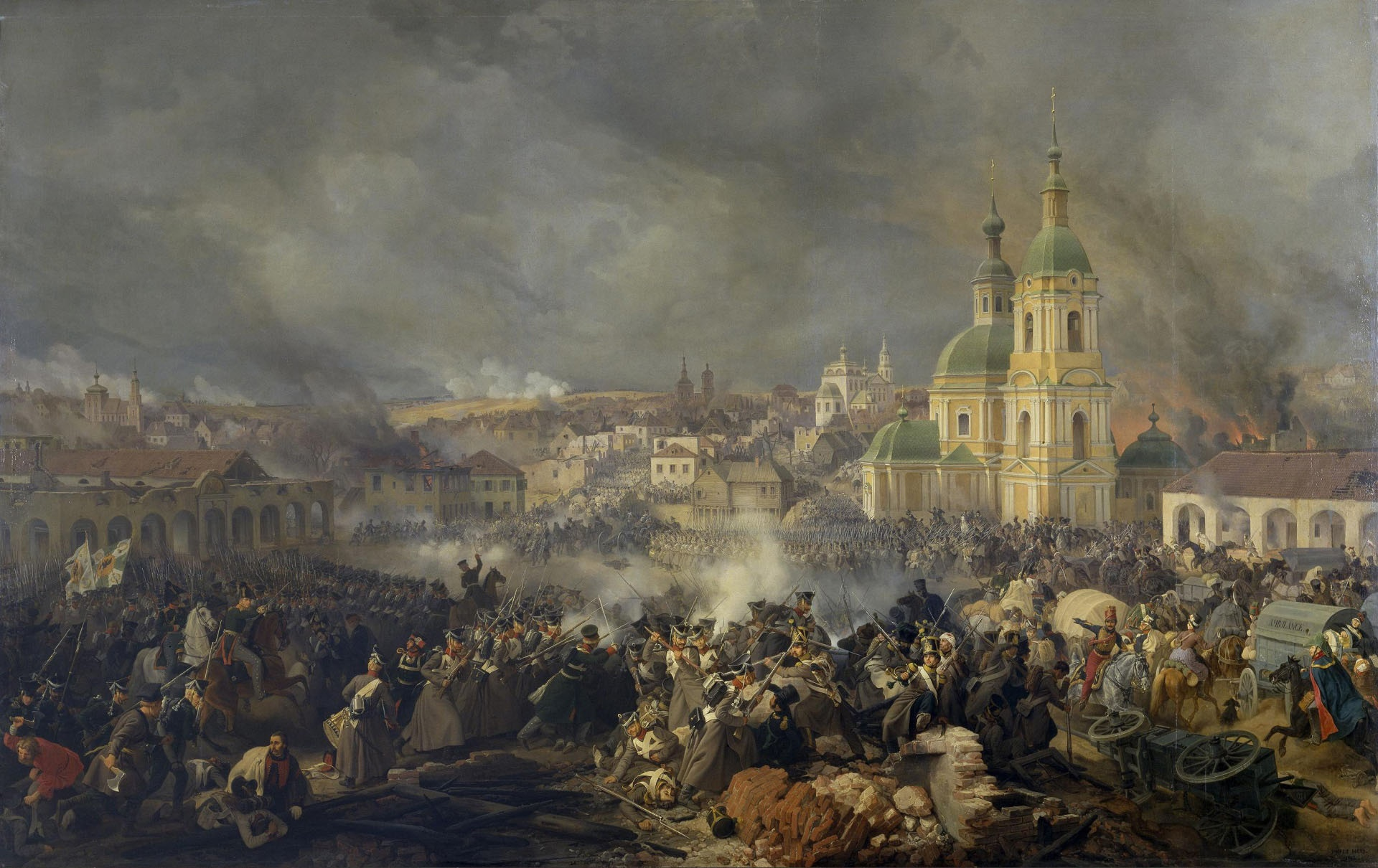
The Battle of Vyazma on 3 November 1812

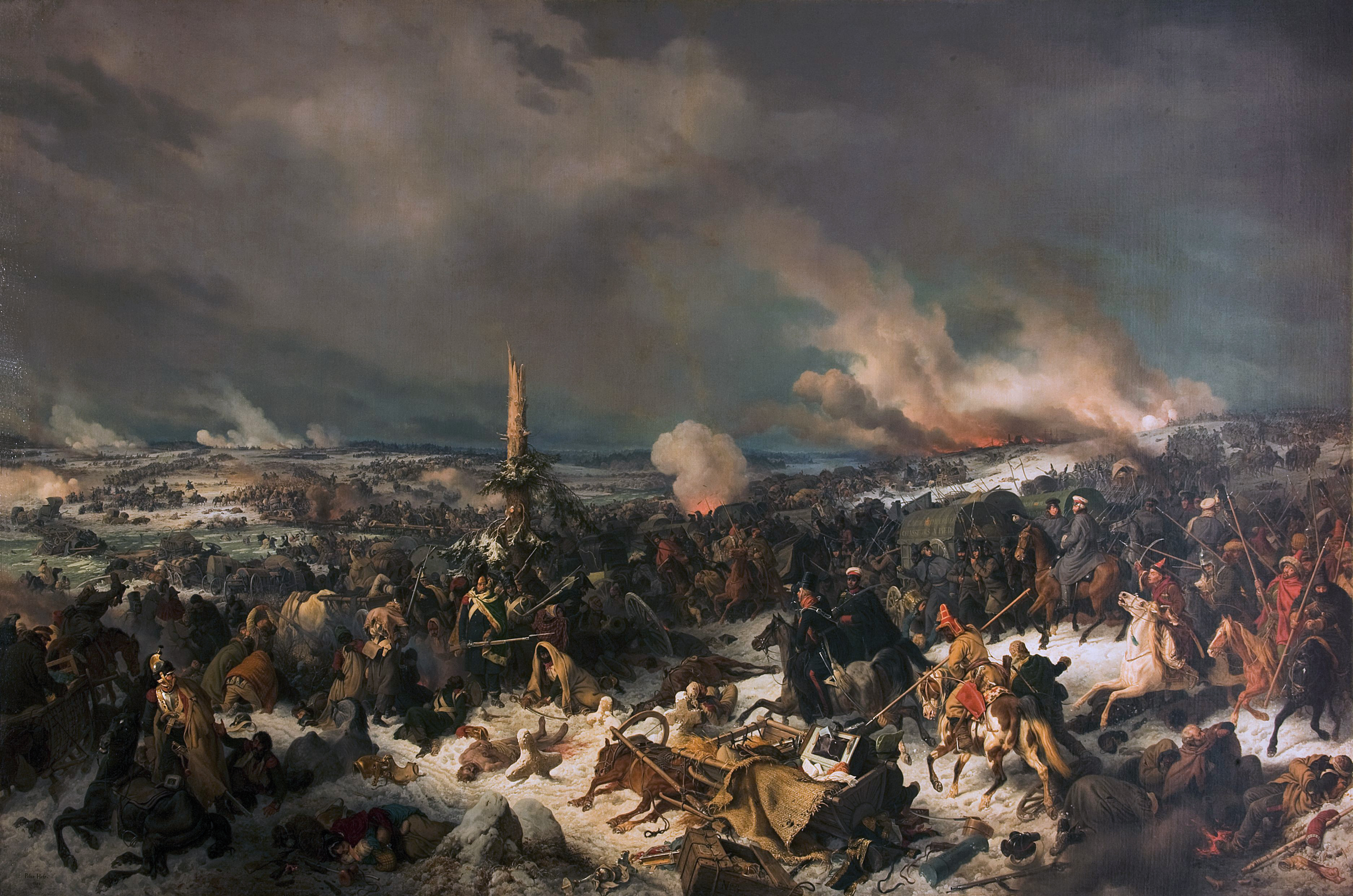
Crossing the Berezina River by Peter von Hess, 1844. Kalmyks and Bashkirs attacking French troops at the Berezina

As the Tsar refused to respond, and encouraged because the weather remained fine and warm into October, Napoleon stayed too long. On 19 October, after five weeks of occupation, the French Army left Moscow. Napoleon's forces still numbered 108,000 men, but his cavalry had been nearly destroyed. With horses exhausted or dead, commanders redirected cavalrymen into infantry units, leaving French forces helpless against Cossack fighters intensifying the guerilla warfare. With little direction or supplies, the army turned to leave the region, struggling on toward worse disaster. Napoleon journeyed along the Old Kaluga road, venturing southward in pursuit of untouched, prosperous regions within Galicia. His aim was to steer clear of the devastated path created by his army's eastward march, instead favoring alternative routes, notably the westward path through Medyn. Avoiding Kutuzov became Napoleon's primary objective, yet his progress faced an obstacle at Maloyaroslavets.

The Battle of Maloyaroslavets, showcasing Kutuzov's strategic maneuvering, compelled the French Army to return to the same Smolensk road they had previously traveled eastward. To further thwart any southern retreat by the French, Kutuzov implemented partisan strategies repeatedly striking at vulnerable points in their supply lines. As the retreating French formation fragmented and dispersed, bands of Cossacks (under Matvei Platov, Vasily Orlov-Denisov and Denis Davydov) and nimble Russian cavalry launched assaults on isolated foraging French units. Fully supplying the army became an insurmountable challenge due to the uninterrupted stretches of forests. The absence of grazing fields and fodder took a toll on the surviving horses, leading to the demise of nearly all due to either starvation or their use as sustenance by starving soldiers. The French cavalry, bereft of horses, faced dissolution, forcing generals and cavalrymen to traverse on foot. The scarcity of horses necessitated abandoning numerous cannons and wagons, a loss that significantly weakened Napoleon's armies throughout subsequent campaigns. Starvation and disease plagued the troops, exacerbating the dire circumstances.

In early November 1812, when Napoleon arrived at Dorogobuzh, he learned that General Claude de Malet had attempted a coup d'état in France. Badly weakened by these circumstances, the French military position collapsed. Further, defeats were inflicted on elements of the Grande Armée at Vyazma, Polotsk and Krasny. Napoleon faced dire circumstances when extreme weather trapped his forces, resulting in the loss of a significant portion of his cavalry and artillery amidst the snow. Russian armies captured the French supply depots at Polotsk, Vitebsk and Minsk, inflicting a logistical disaster on Napoleon's fast-collapsing Russian operation. However, the union with Victor, Oudinot and Dąbrowski at the Bobr brought the numerical strength of the Grande Armée back up to some 49,000 French combatants as well as about 40,000 stragglers. All the French corps went on to Borisov, where a strategic bridge to cross the Berezina was destroyed by the Russian army. The crossing of the river Berezina was a final French calamity: two Russian armies inflicted heavy casualties on the remnants of the Grande Armée. Because of an incursion of thaw the ice on the Berezina river started to melt during the last major battle of the campaign. In military terms, the escape can be considered as a French strategic victory. It was a missed opportunity for the Russians who blamed Pavel Chichagov.

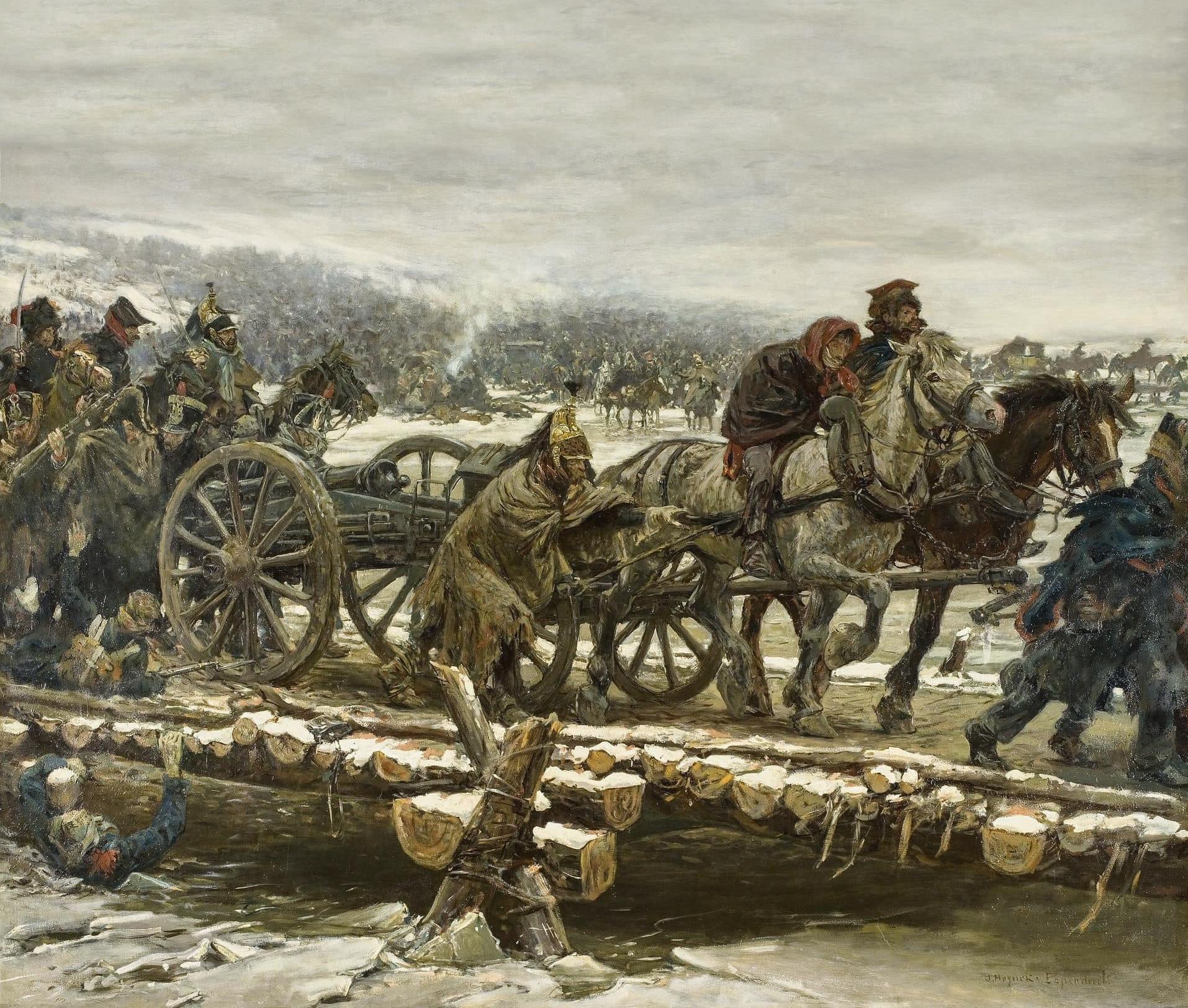
Dutch and French soldiers crossing the Berezina, by Jan Hoynck van Papendrecht.

Dutch officer Jean-François Dumonceau, who served as captain in the 2nd Lancers Regiment of the Imperial Guard during the campaign, gave a vivid description of the desperate crossing at the Berezina in his memoirs:

At the bridges the Russians bombard the mass of people gathered there with a battery of cannons. From our vantage point it appears as a wildly surging crowd trying to escape the fire, moving from one bridge to another in the hope of crossing the river. Waves of people surge back and forth while the cannon fire tears enormous gaps into the terror-stricken mass. Under the pressure of the crowd, one of the bridges collapses. Countless people fall into the water among the ice floes and disappear into the depths. Other unfortunates throw themselves into the river in an attempt to swim to safety. The constant wailing and the splintering of the wagons create an indescribable noise. It sounds like the roaring of a distant storm at sea and fills us with horror.

On 3 December, Napoleon published the 29th Bulletin in which he informed the outside world for the first time of the catastrophic state of his army. He abandoned the army on 5 December and returned home on a sled, leaving the sick Murat in command. In the following weeks, the Grande Armée shrank further, and on 14 December 1812, it left Russian territory.

=== Cold weather ===
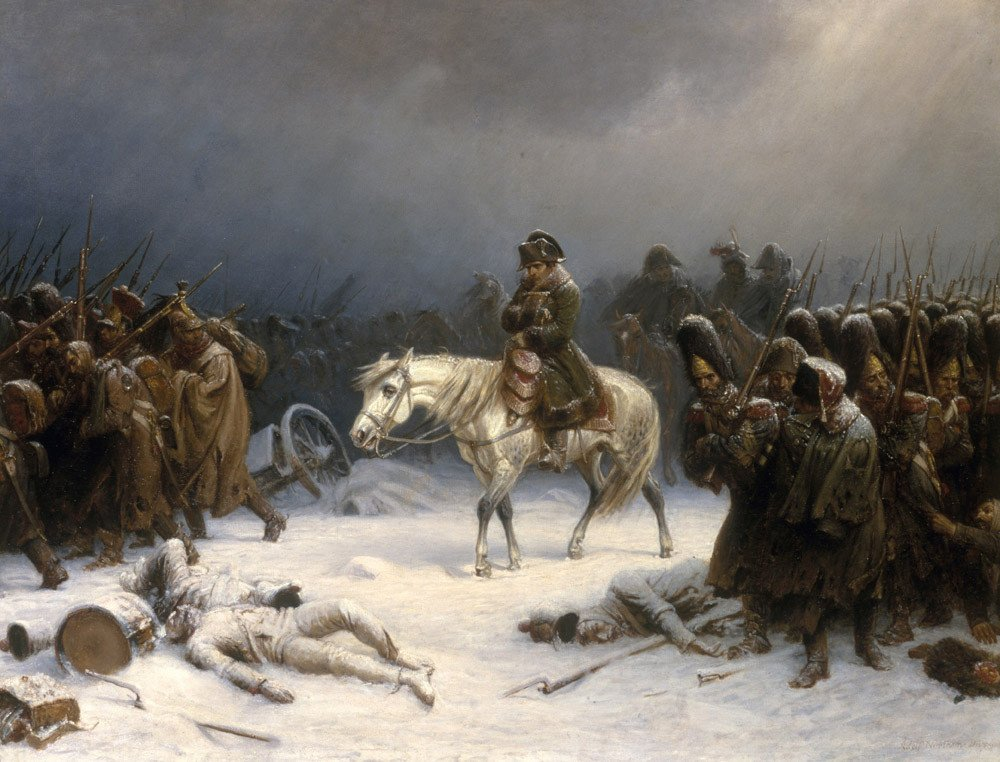
Napoleon's withdrawal from Russia, painting by Adolph Northen

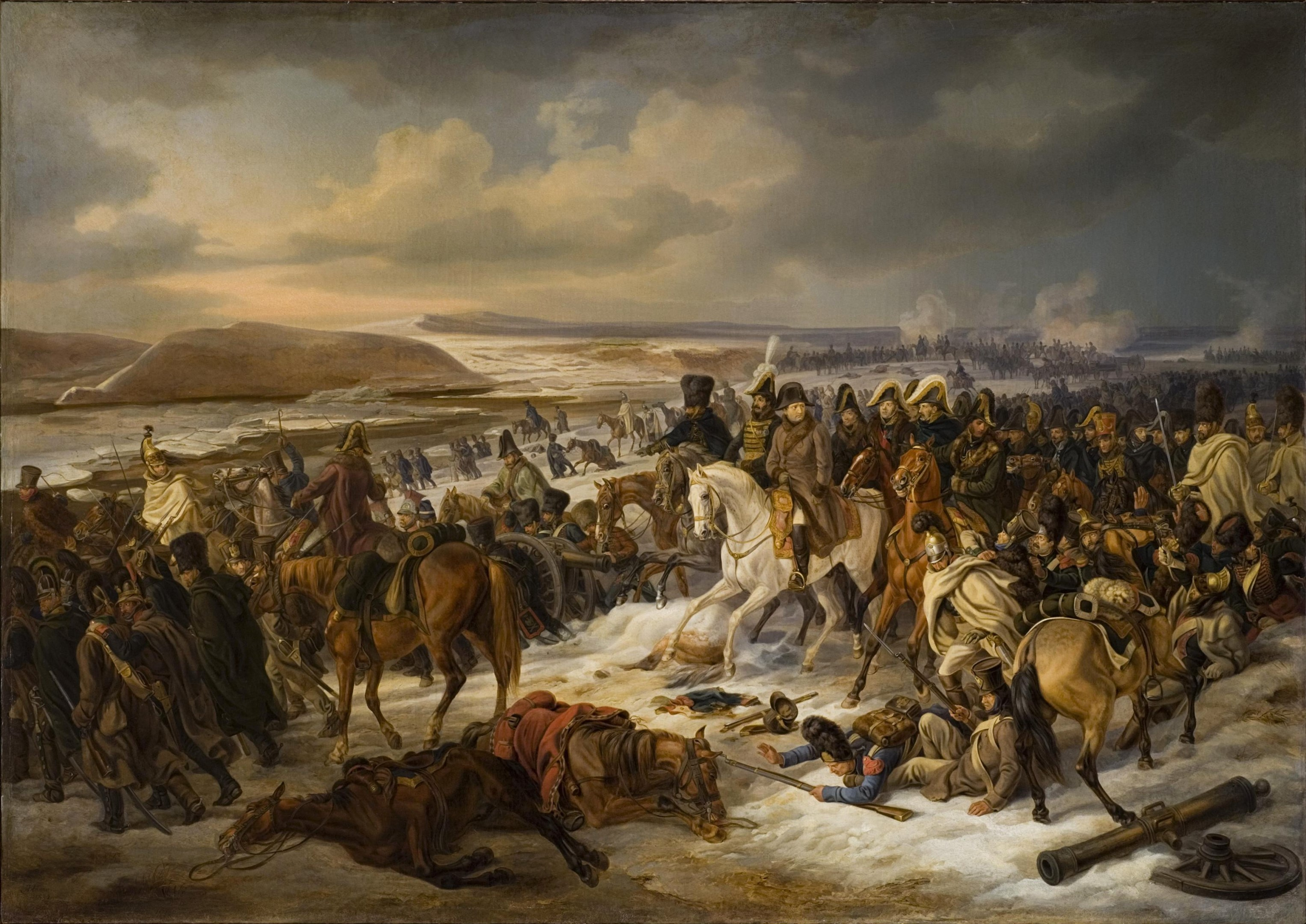
Napoleon among his retreating troops at the Berezina, painting by Albrecht Adam

Following the campaign, a saying arose that "General Winter" defeated Napoleon, alluding to the Russian Winter. Minard's map shows that the opposite is true, as the French losses were highest in the summer and autumn due to inadequate preparation of logistics resulting in insufficient supplies, while many troops were also killed by disease. Thus, the outcome of the campaign was decided long before the cold weather became a factor.

When winter arrived on 6 November with a blizzard, the army was still equipped with summer clothing and did not have the means to protect themselves from the cold or snow. It had also failed to forge caulkin shoes for the horses to enable them to traverse roads that had become iced over. The most devastating effect of the cold weather upon Napoleon's forces occurred during their retreat. Starvation and gangrene coupled with hypothermia led to the loss of tens of thousands of men. Heavy artillery pieces, loot, and wagons were abandoned as irreplaceable draft animals perished. The intense cold enfeebled the brains of those whose health had already suffered, especially of those who had had dysentery, but soon, while the cold increased daily, its pernicious effect was noticed in all.

In his memoir, Napoleon's close adviser Armand de Caulaincourt recounted scenes of massive loss, and offered a vivid description of mass death through hypothermia:

The cold was so intense that bivouacking was no longer supportable. Bad luck to those who fell asleep by a campfire! Furthermore, disorganization was perceptibly gaining ground in the Guard. One constantly found men who, overcome by the cold, had been forced to drop out and had fallen to the ground, too weak or too numb to stand. Ought one to help them along—which practically meant carrying them. They begged one to let them alone. There were bivouacs all along the road—ought one to take them to a campfire? Once these poor wretches fell asleep they were dead. If they resisted the craving for sleep, another passer-by would help them along a little farther, thus prolonging their agony for a short while, but not saving them, for in this condition the drowsiness engendered by cold is irresistibly strong.

This befell a Grande Armée that was ill-equipped for cold weather. The French deficiencies in equipment caused by the assumption that their campaign would be concluded before the cold weather set in were a large factor in the number of casualties they suffered. After a few days of thaw, the temperature dropped again on 23 November. From the Berezina, the retreat was nothing but utter flight. The preservation of war materiel and military positions was no longer considered. When the night-time temperature dropped to minus 35 degrees Celsius it proved catastrophic for Loison's untried soldiers. Some suffered from snow blindness. Within three days, his division of 15,000 soldiers lost 12,000 men without a battle.

=== Summary ===
In Napoleon's Russian Campaign, Riehn sums up the limitations of Napoleon's logistics as follows:

The military machine Napoleon the artilleryman had created was perfectly suited to fight short, violent campaigns, but whenever a long-term sustained effort was in the offing, it tended to expose feet of clay. [...] In the end, the logistics of the French military machine proved wholly inadequate. The experiences of short campaigns had left the French supply services completely unprepared for [..] Russia, and this was despite the precautions Napoleon had taken. There was no quick remedy that might have repaired these inadequacies from one campaign to the next. [...] The limitations of horse-drawn transport and the road networks to support it were simply not up to the task. Indeed, modern militaries have long been in agreement that Napoleon's military machine at its apex, and the scale on which he attempted to operate with it in 1812 and 1813, had become an anachronism that could succeed only with the use of railroads and the telegraph. And these had not yet been invented.

Napoleon lacked the apparatus to efficiently move so many troops across such large distances of hostile territory. The French supply depots established in the Russian interior failed in their purpose as supplies could not be distributed quickly enough. The French train battalions did their best, but the distances, the speed required, and the poor conditions they labored under meant that the demands Napoleon placed on them were too great. Napoleon's demand of a speedy advance by the Grande Armée over a network of dirt roads that dissolved into deep mires further broke down his logistical network as weakened draft animals collapsed from overwork and vehicles that could not be repaired broke down. As the graph of Charles Joseph Minard, given below, shows, the Grande Armée incurred the majority of its losses during the march to Moscow during the summer and autumn.

== Historical assessment ==
=== Grande Armée ===
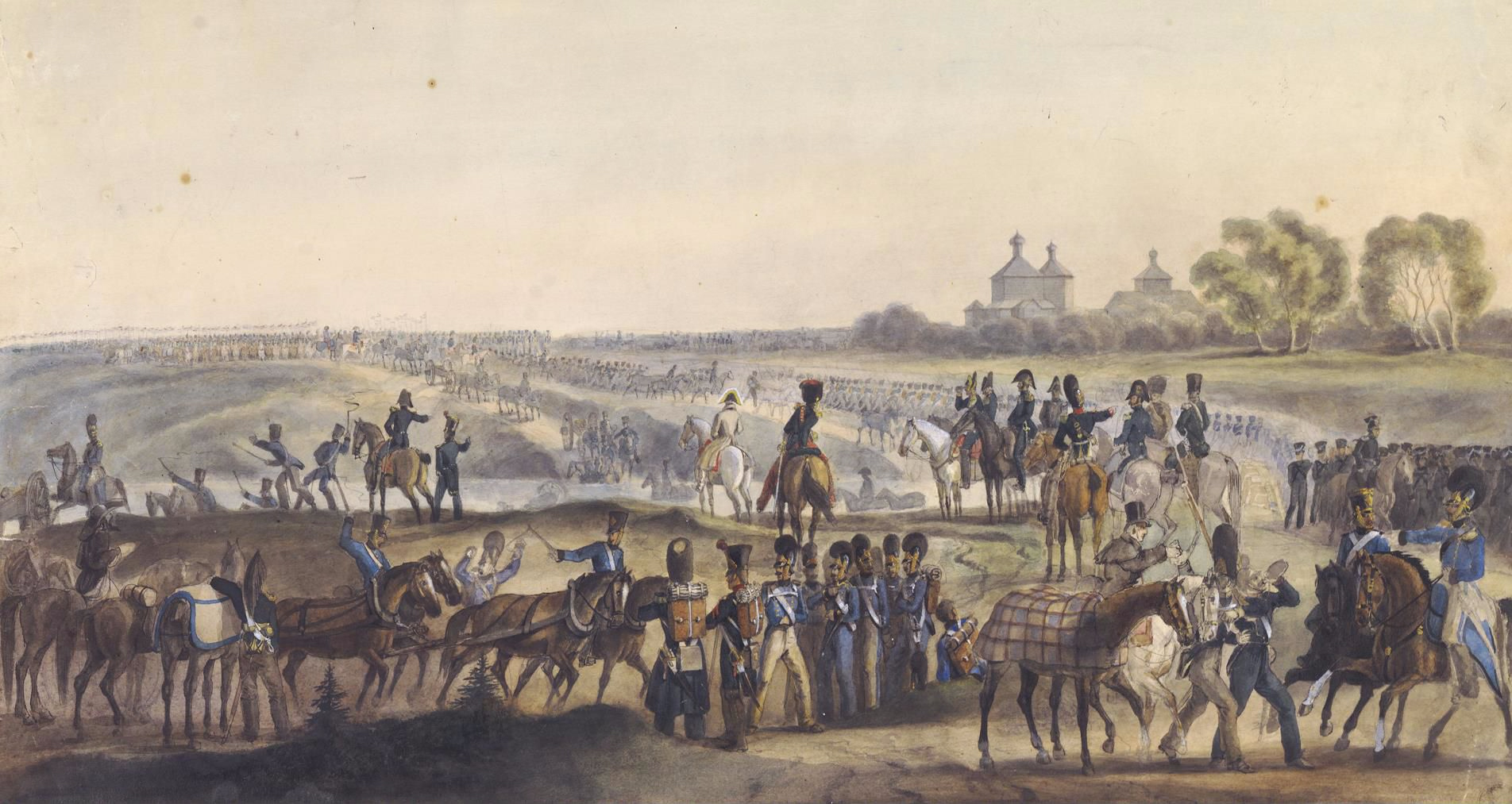
The Grande Armée crossing the Dnieper on 14 August 1812

On 24 June 1812, around 400,000–500,000 men of the Grande Armée, the largest army assembled up to that point in European history, crossed the border into Russia and headed towards Moscow. Anthony Joes wrote in the Journal of Conflict Studies that figures on how many men Napoleon took into Russia and how many eventually came out vary widely. In total (excluding the separate Austrian and Prussian contingents), Napoleon deployed 600,000 soldiers, only half of whom were from France. Contingents from client states included 117,000 Germans (17,000 Westphalians and the rest from other Confederation of the Rhine members), 90,000 Poles from the Duchy of Warsaw, 30,000 Italians from the Kingdoms of Italy and Naples, and 9,000 Swiss from the Swiss Confederacy. Felix Markham thinks that 450,000 crossed the Neman on 25 June 1812. When Ney and the rearguard recrossed the Neman on December 14, he had barely a thousand men fit for action. James Marshall-Cornwall says 510,000 Imperial troops entered Russia. Eugene Tarle believes that 420,000 crossed with Napoleon and 150,000 eventually followed, for a grand total of 570,000. Richard K. Riehn provides the following figures: 685,000 men marched into Russia in 1812, of whom around 355,000 were French; 31,000 soldiers marched out again in some sort of military formation, with perhaps another 35,000 stragglers, for a total of fewer than 70,000 known survivors. Adam Zamoyski estimated that between 550,000 and 600,000 French and allied troops (including reinforcements) operated beyond the Neman, of which as many as 400,000 troops died, but this includes deaths of prisoners during captivity.

Minard's famous infographic (see below) depicts the march ingeniously by showing the size of the advancing army, overlaid on a rough map, as well as the retreating soldiers together with temperatures recorded (as much as 30 below zero on the Réaumur scale (−38 °C, −36 °F)) on their return. The numbers on this chart have 422,000 crossing the Neman with Napoleon, 22,000 taking a side trip early on in the campaign, 100,000 surviving the battles en route to Moscow and returning from there; only 4,000 survive the march back, to be joined by 6,000 that survived from that initial 22,000 in the feint attack northward; in the end, only 10,000 crossed the Neman back out of the initial 422,000.

=== Imperial Russian Army ===
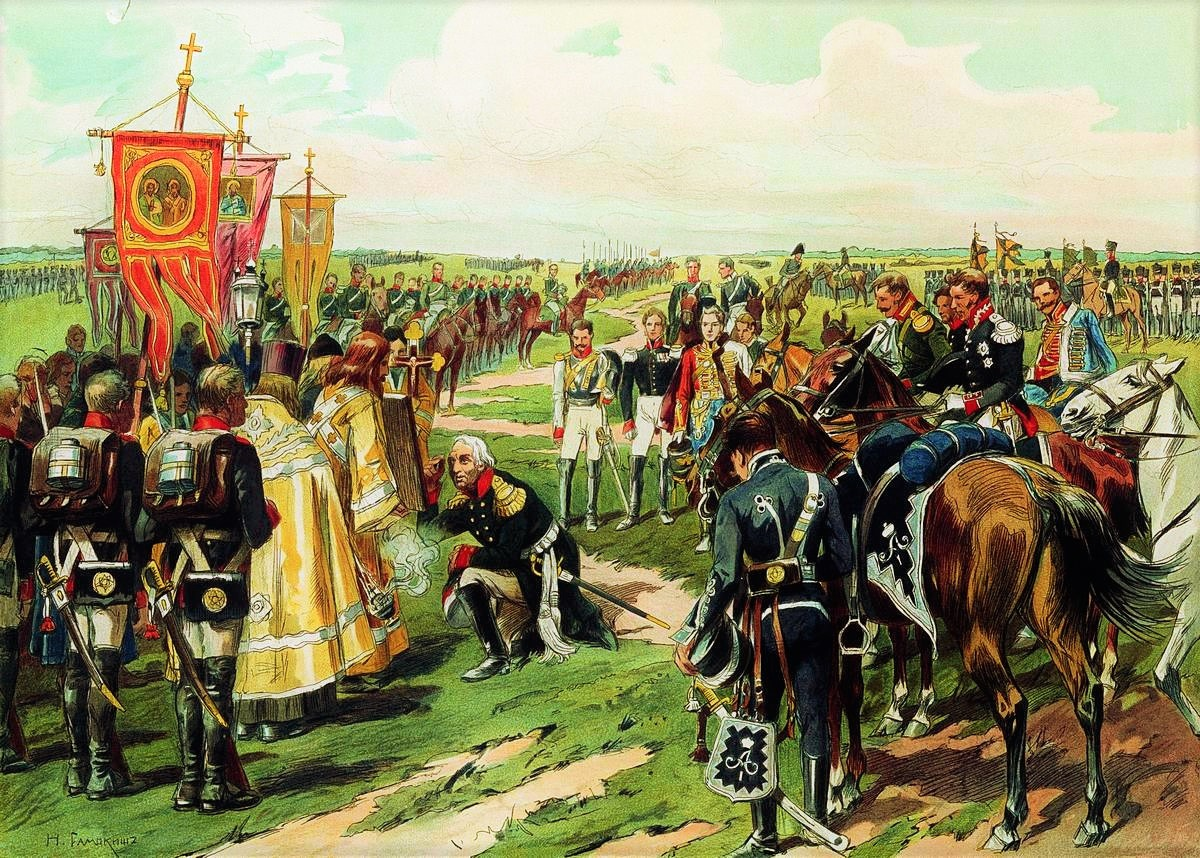
Kutuzov before the Battle of Borodino. Lithograph by N. S. Samokish.

Barclay de Tolly, the Minister of War and field commander of the First Western Army and General of Infantry, served as the Commander in Chief of the Russian Armies. According to Tolstoy in War and Peace (Book X) he was unpopular and regarded as a foreigner by Bagration who was higher in rank but had to follow his orders. Kutuzov replaced Barclay and acted as Commander-in-chief during the retreat following the Battle of Smolensk.

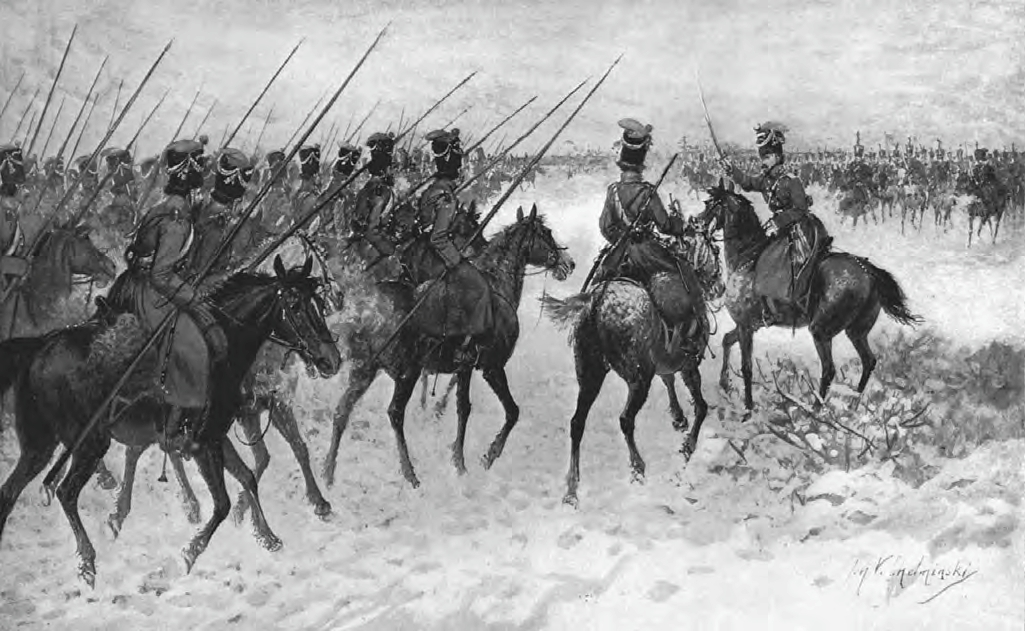
As irregular cavalry, the Cossack horsemen of the Russian steppes were best suited to reconnaissance, scouting, and harassing the enemy's flanks and supply lines.

These forces, however, could count on reinforcements from the second line, which totalled 129,000 men and 8,000 Cossacks with 434 guns and 433 rounds of ammunition.

Of these, about 105,000 men were actually available for the defence against the invasion. In the third line were the 36 recruit depots and militias, which came to a total of approximately 161,000 men of various and highly disparate military values, of which about 133,000 actually took part in the defence.

Thus, the grand total of all the forces was 488,000 men, of which about 428,000 gradually came into action against the Grande Armee. This bottom line, however, includes more than 80,000 Cossacks and militiamen, as well as about 20,000 men who garrisoned the fortresses in the operational area. The majority of the officer corps came from the aristocracy. About 7% of the officer corps came from the Baltic German nobility from the governorates of Estonia and Livonia. Because the Baltic German nobles tended to be better educated than the ethnic Russian nobility, the Baltic Germans were often favoured with positions in high command and various technical positions. The Russian Empire had no universal educational system, and those who could afford it had to hire tutors or send their children to private schools. The educational level of the Russian nobility and gentry varied enormously depending on the quality of the tutors and private schools, with some Russian nobles being extremely well educated while others were just barely literate. The Baltic German nobility was more inclined to invest in their children's education than the ethnic Russian nobility, which led to the government favouring them when granting officers' commissions. Of the 800 doctors in the Russian Army in 1812, almost all of them were Baltic Germans. The British historian Dominic Lieven noted that, at the time, the Russian elite defined Russianness in terms of loyalty to the House of Romanov rather in terms of language or culture, and as the Baltic German aristocrats were very loyal, they were considered and considered themselves to be Russian despite speaking German as their first language.

Sweden, Russia's only ally, did not send supporting troops, but the alliance made it possible to withdraw the 45,000-man Russian corps Steinheil from Finland and use it in the later battles (20,000 men were sent to Riga and Polotsk).

=== Losses ===
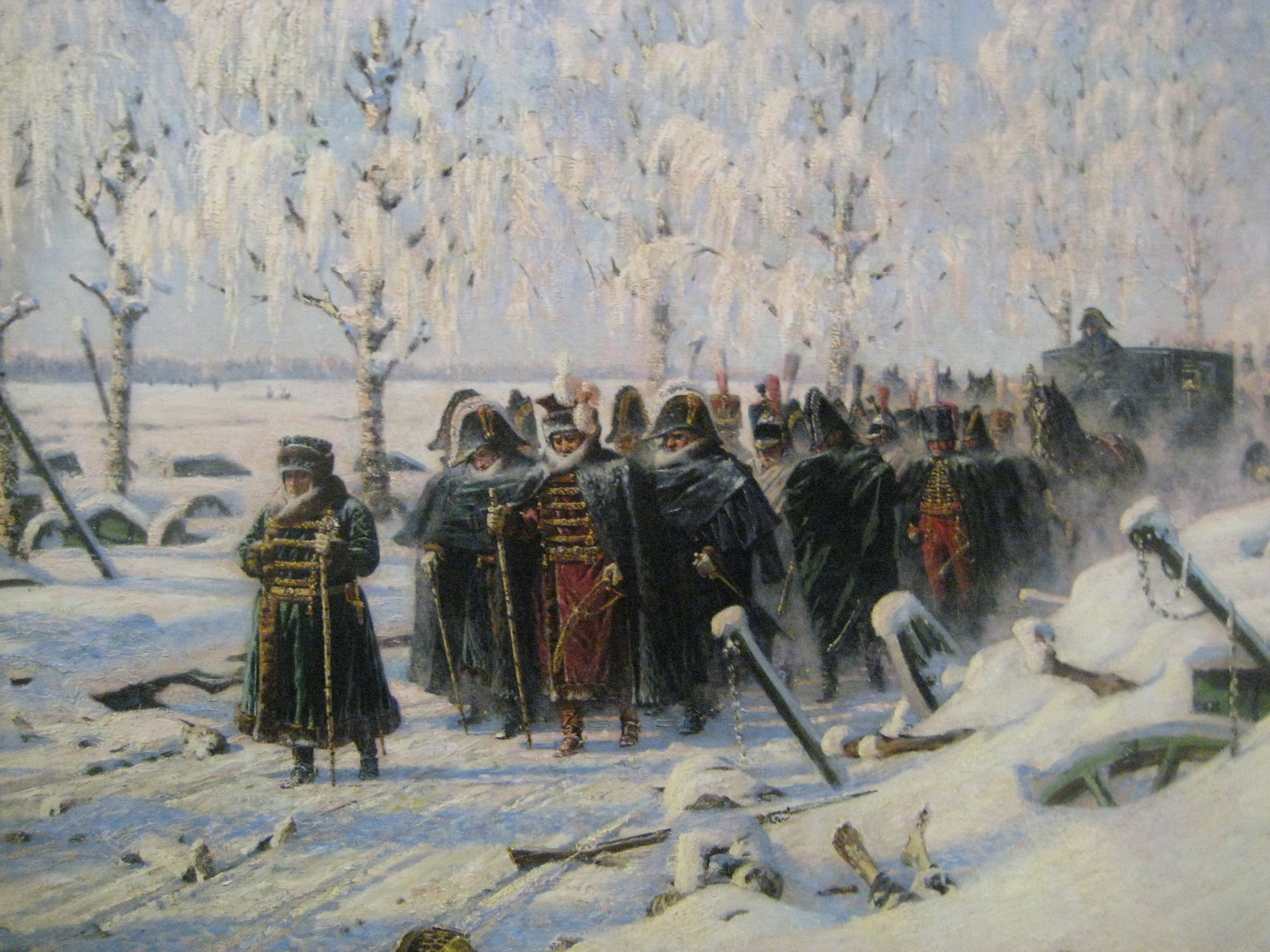
Napoleon's retreat, surrounded by the Old Guards after the Battle of Krasnoi. Painting by Vasily Vereshchagin

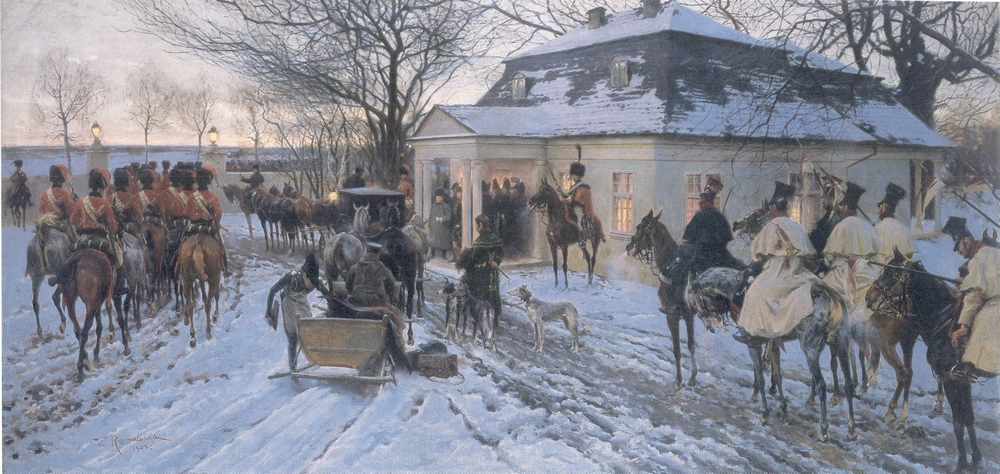
Painting Napoleon in Smorgon by Zygmunt Rozwadowski

Napoleon lost more than 500,000 men in Russia. Out of an original force of 615,000, only 110,000 frostbitten and half-starved survivors stumbled back. Desgenettes took care of wounded. Marshall Lefebvre arrived with Louise Fusil, who was one of the few women who survived the retreat. It is questionable if Ida Saint Elme, ‘Courtisane de la Grande Armée’, was another one.

It is estimated that of the 612,000 combatants who entered Russia, only 112,000 returned to the frontier. Among the casualties, 100,000 are thought to have been killed in action, 200,000 to have died from other causes, 50,000 to have been left sick in hospitals, 50,000 to have deserted, and 100,000 to have been taken as prisoners of war. The French themselves lost 70,000 in action and 120,000 wounded, as against the non-French contingents' 30,000 and 60,000. Russian casualties have been estimated at 200,000 killed, 50,000 dispersed or deserting, and 150,000 wounded.

Recent Russian studies show that Russians captured over 110,000 prisoners during the six-month-long campaign. The harsh winter, as well as popular violence, malnutrition, sickness and hardships during transportation, meant that two-thirds of these men (and women) perished within weeks of captivity. Official reports from forty-eight Russian provinces reveal that 65,503 prisoners had died in Russia by February 1813. Other 39,645 were still held prisoner by the same date, including a group of 50 women and 7 children.

Hay has argued that the destruction of the Dutch contingent (20,225) of the Grande Armée was not a result of the death of most of its members. Rather, its various units disintegrated and the troops scattered. Later, some of its personnel were collected and reorganised into the new Dutch army.

Most of the Prussian contingent survived thanks to the Convention of Tauroggen and almost the whole Austrian contingent under Schwarzenberg withdrew successfully. The Russians formed the Russian-German Legion from other German prisoners and deserters.

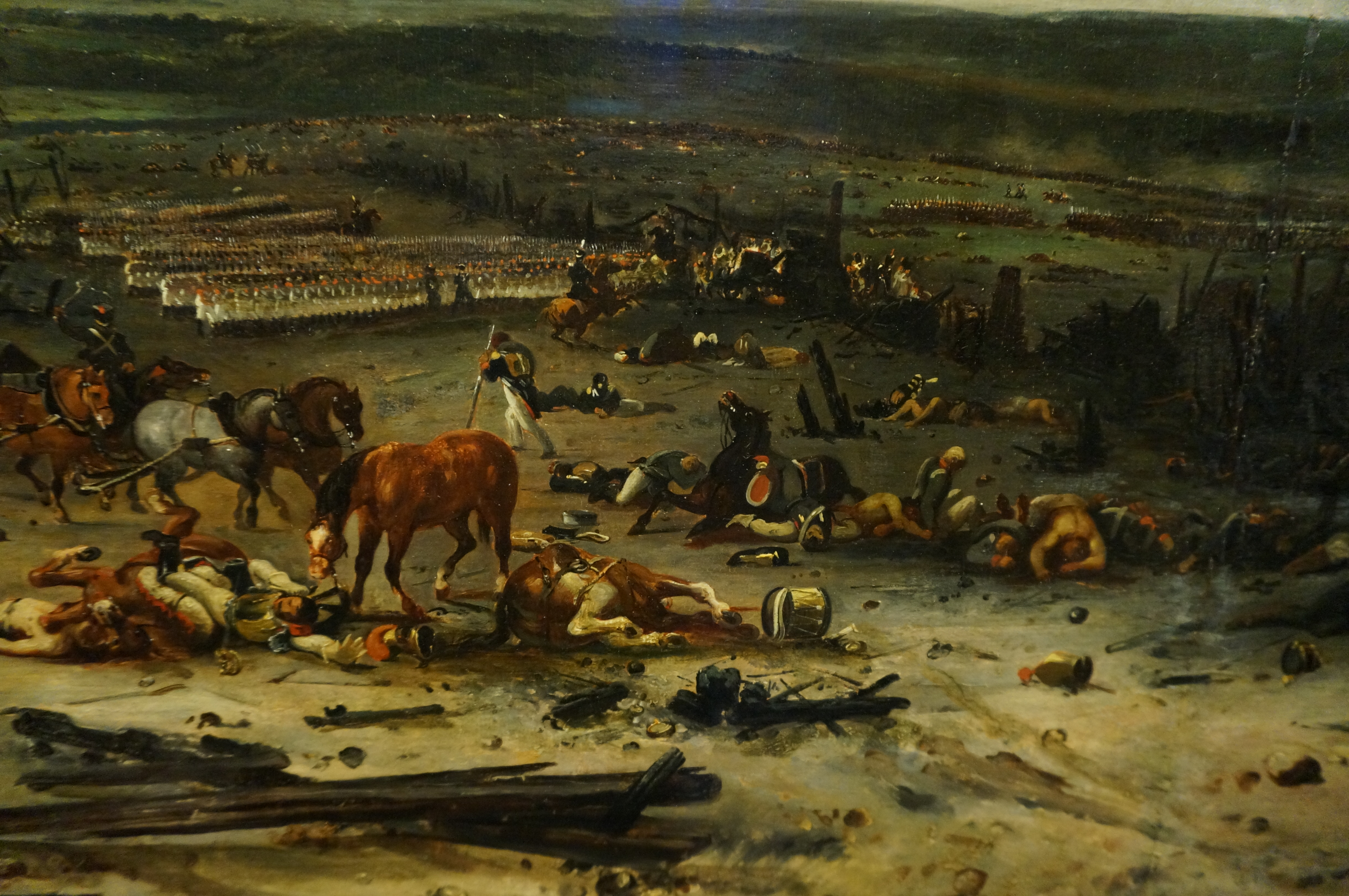
Casualties in the Battle of Borodino

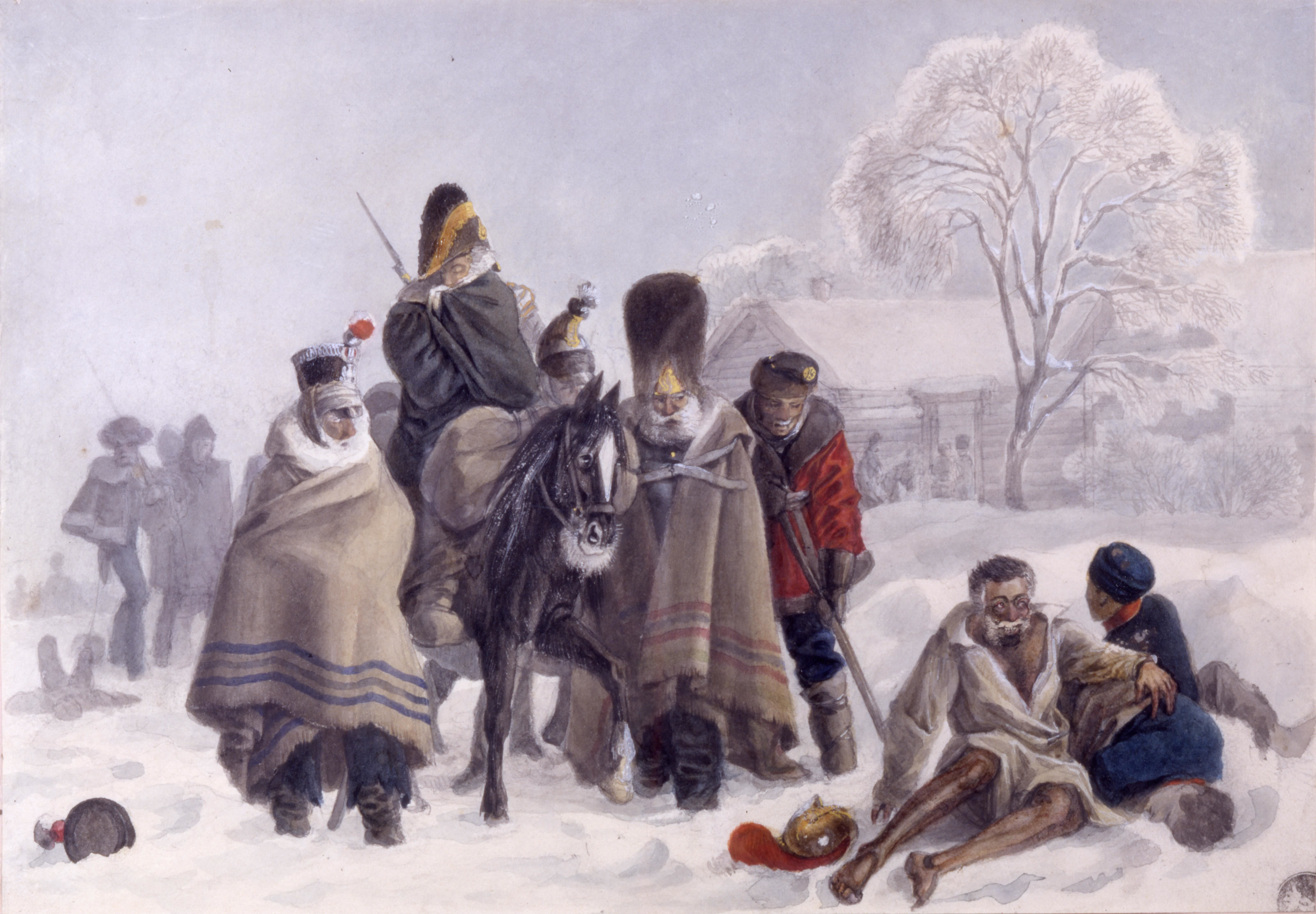
The remnants of the Grande Armée during the retreat

Russian casualties in the few open battles are comparable to the French losses, but civilian losses along the devastating campaign route were much higher than the military casualties. In total, despite earlier estimates giving figures of several million dead, around one million were killed, including civilians—fairly evenly split between the French and Russians. Military losses amounted to 300,000 French, about 72,000 Poles, 50,000 Italians, 80,000 Germans, and 61,000 from 16 other nations. As well as the loss of human life, the French also lost some 150,000 horses and between 1,000 to 1,300 artillery pieces, 875 of which were collected and recorded in Moscow in November 1814.

The losses of the Russian armies are difficult to assess. The 19th-century historian Michael Bogdanovich assessed reinforcements of the Russian armies during the war using the Military Registry archives of the General Staff. According to this, the reinforcements totalled 134,000 men. The main army at the time of capture of Vilnius in December had 70,000 men, whereas its number at the start of the invasion had been about 150,000. Thus, total losses would come to 210,000 men. Of these, about 40,000 returned to duty. Losses of the formations operating in secondary areas of operations as well as losses in militia units were about 40,000. Thus, he came up with the number of 210,000 dead soldiers and militiamen. Bodart gives a similar figure of 200,000 Russian troops dead (out of 623,000 men committed including 95,000 Cossacks and militia) compared to 300,000 French and allied. According to Dominic Lieven Russian espionage (Alexander Chernyshyov, Karl Nesselrode) was well organized. The Russian light cavalry was superior from the start with a good supply of horses; the musketeers were not.

=== Aftermath ===
The Russian victory over the French Army in 1812 was a significant blow to Napoleon's ambitions of European dominance. His army was shattered and morale was low, both for French troops still in Russia, fighting battles just before the campaign ended, and for the troops on other fronts. Napoleon alone was able to maintain any semblance of order; with his absence, Murat and the other officers lost all authority.

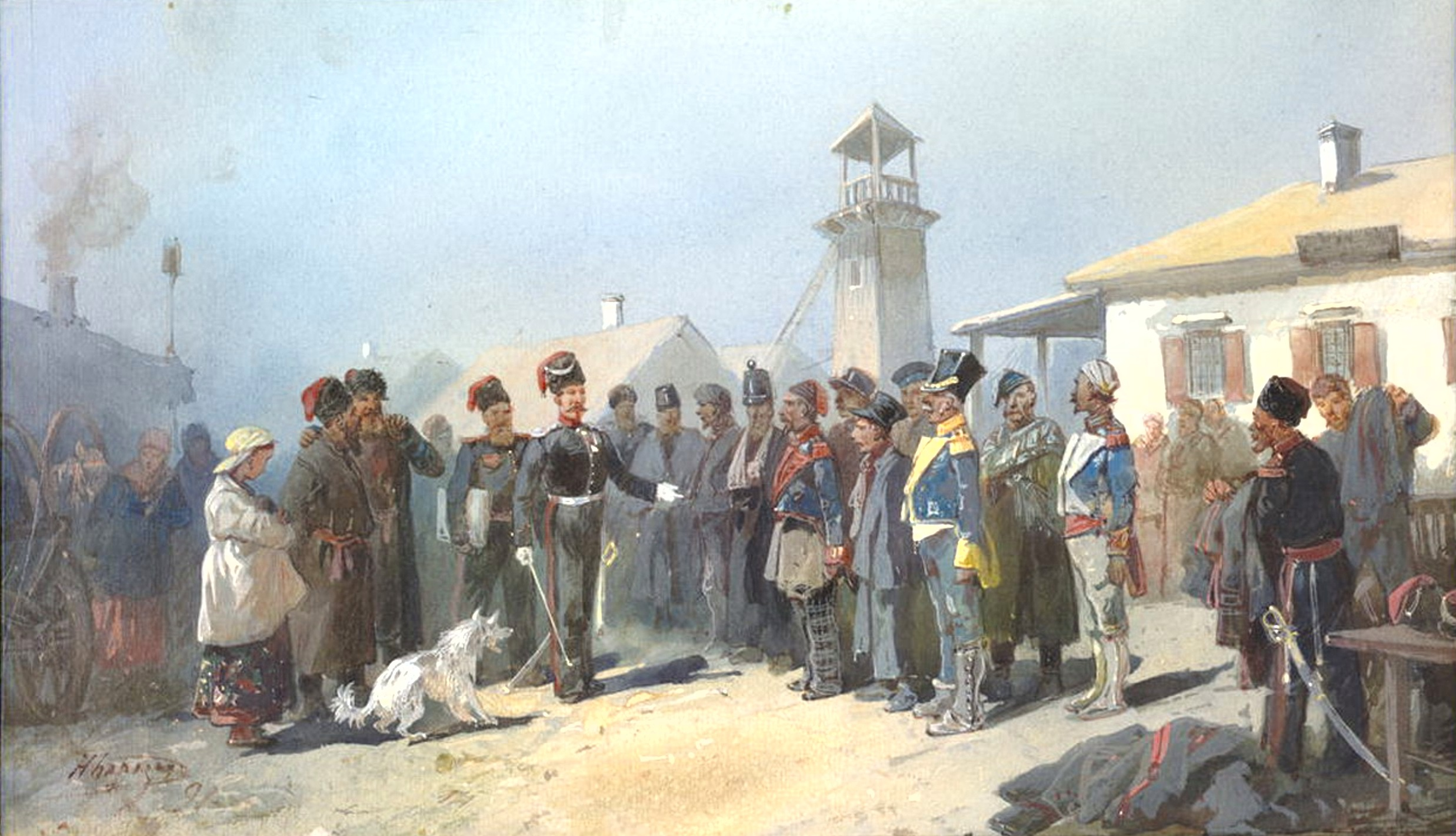
"Enlistment in the Cossacks of captured Poles of Napoleon's army, 1813". Painting of Nikolay Karazin, 1881

In January 1813 the French army gathered behind the Vistula some 23,000 strong. The Austrian and Prussian troops mustered some 35,000 men in addition. The number of deserters and stragglers having left Russia alive is unknown by definition. The number of new inhabitants of Russia is unknown. The number of prisoners is estimated at 100,000, of whom more than 50,000 died in captivity.

The War of the Sixth Coalition started in 1813 as the Russian campaign was decisive for the Napoleonic Wars and led to Napoleon's defeat and exile on the island of Elba. For Russia, the term Patriotic War (an English rendition of the Russian Отечественная война) became a symbol for a strengthened national identity that had a great effect on Russian patriotism in the 19th century. A series of revolutions followed, starting with the Decembrist revolt of 1825 and ending with the February Revolution of 1917.

=== Historiography ===
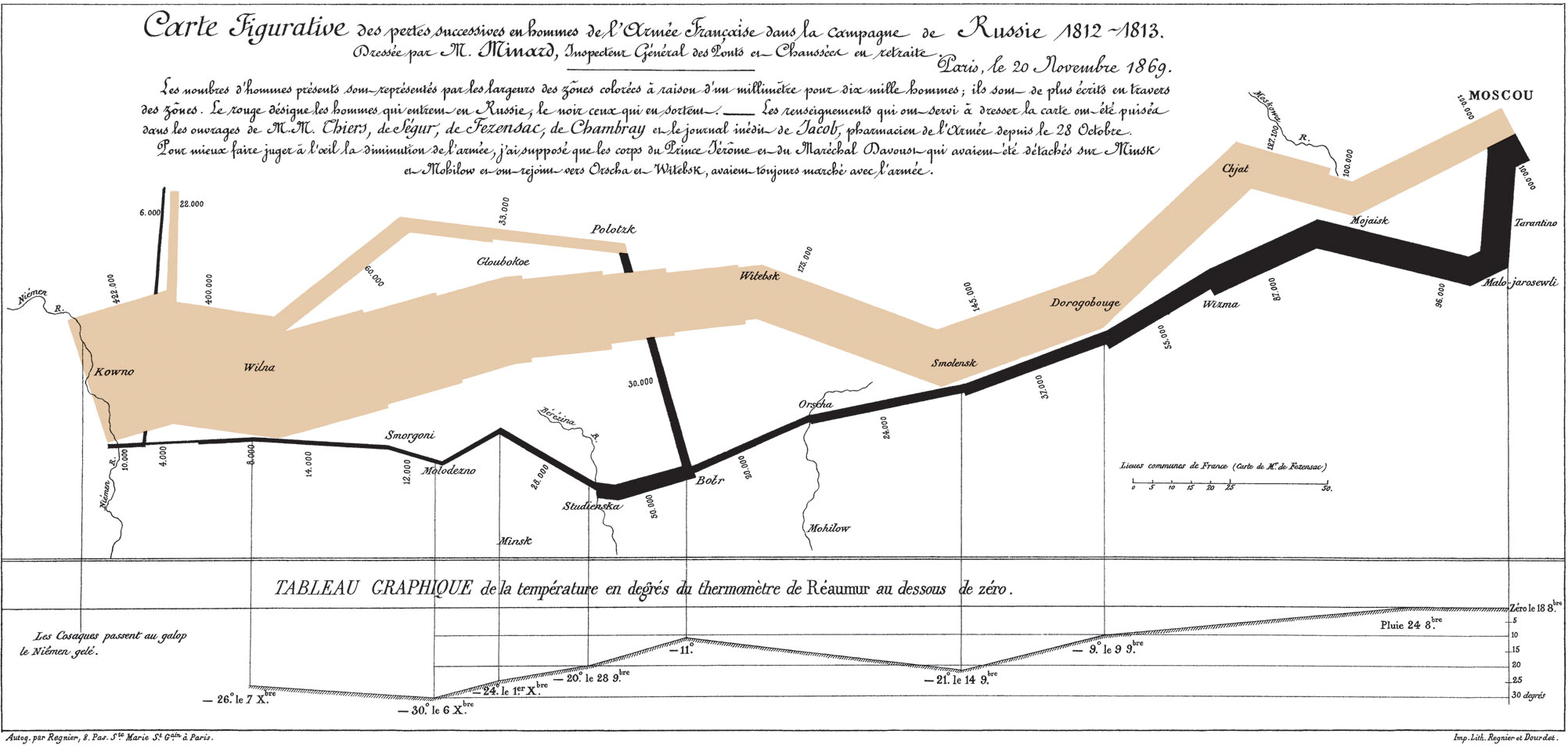
Minard's Map of French casualties see also Attrition warfare against Napoleon. Compare on Minard's Map the location of Vilnius.

Dominic Lieven wrote that much of the historiography about the campaign for various reasons distorts the story of the Russian war against France in 1812–14. The number of Western historians who are fluent in French or German vastly outnumbers those who are fluent in Russian, which has the effect that many Western historians simply ignore Russian language sources when writing about the campaign because they cannot read them.

According to von Lieven, memoirs written by French veterans of the campaign together with much of the work done by French historians show the influence of "orientalism", which depicted Russia as a strange, backward, exotic and barbaric "Asian" nation that was intrinsically inferior to the West, especially France. The picture drawn by the French is that of a vastly superior army being defeated by geography, the climate and just plain bad fortune. German-language sources are not as hostile to the Russians as French sources, but many of the Prussian officers, such as Carl von Clausewitz (who did not speak Russian), who joined the Russian Army to fight against the French, found service with a foreign army both frustrating and strange, and their accounts reflected these experiences. Lieven compared those historians who use Clausewitz's account of his time in Russian service as their main source for the 1812 campaign to those historians who might use an account written by a Free French officer who did not speak English who served with the British Army in World War II as their main source for the British war effort in the Second World War.

In Russia, the official historical line until 1917 was that the peoples of the Russian Empire had rallied together in defence of the throne against a foreign invader. Because many of the younger Russian officers in the 1812 campaign took part in the Decembrist uprising of 1825, their roles in history were erased at the order of Emperor Nicholas I. Likewise, because many of the officers who were also veterans who stayed loyal during the Decembrist uprising went on to become ministers in the tyrannical regime of Emperor Nicholas I, they had a negative reputation among the radical intelligentsia of 19th century Russia. For example, Count Alexander von Benckendorff is thought by von Lieven to have achieved good results militarily in 1812 commanding a Cossack company, but because he later become the Chief of the Third Section Of His Imperial Majesty's Chancellery as the secret police were called, was one of the closest friends of Nicholas I and is infamous for his persecution of Russia's national poet Alexander Pushkin, he is not well remembered in Russia and his role in 1812 is usually ignored.

Furthermore, the 19th century was a great age of nationalism and there was a tendency by historians in the Allied nations to give the lion's share of the credit for defeating France to their own respective nation with British historians claiming that it was the United Kingdom that played the most important role in defeating Napoleon; Austrian historians giving that honour to their nation; Russian historians writing that it was Russia that played the greatest role in the victory, and Prussian and later German historians writing that it was Prussia that made the difference. In such a context, various historians liked to diminish the contributions of their allies. Von Lieven's account doesn't mention the influence of Polish national feeling on convictions concerning the war, which were also significant, also in the aftermath.

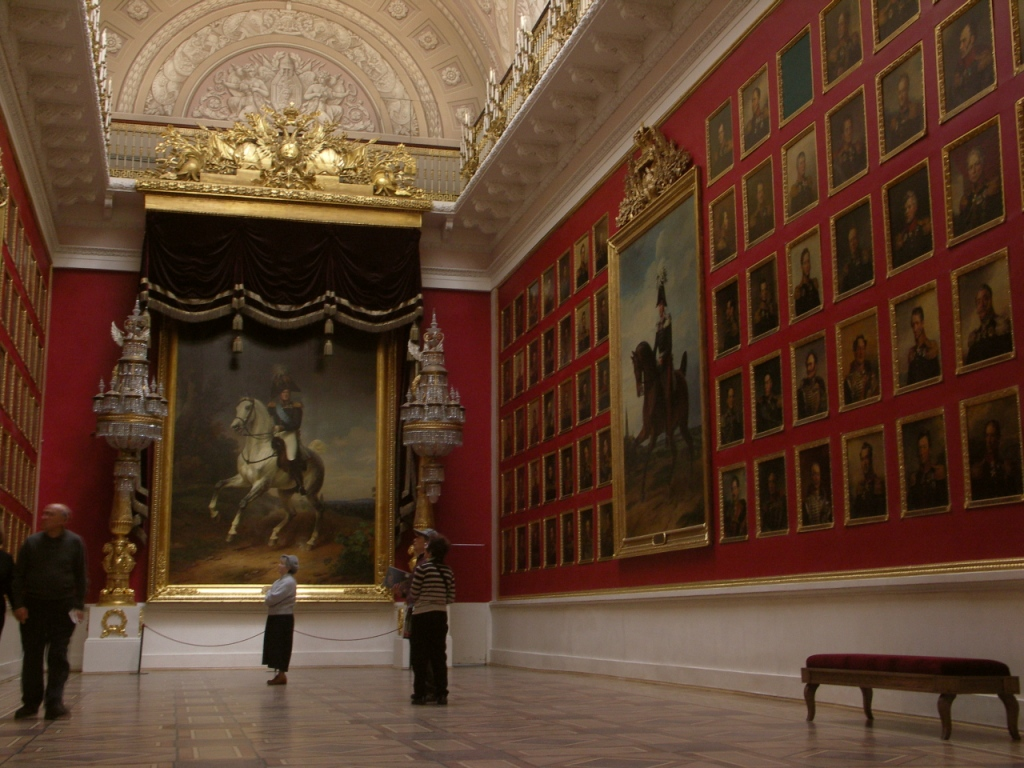
The hall of military fame in the Winter Palace with portraits of Russian generals

Leo Tolstoy was not a historian, but his popular 1869 historical novel War and Peace, which depicted the war as a triumph of what Lieven called the "moral strength, courage and patriotism of ordinary Russians" with military leadership a negligible factor, has shaped the popular understanding of the war in both Russia and abroad from the 19th century onward. A recurring theme of War and Peace is that certain events are just fated to happen, and there is nothing that a leader can do to challenge destiny, a view of history that dramatically discounts leadership as a factor in history. During the Soviet period, historians engaged in what Lieven called huge distortions to make history fit with Communist ideology, with Marshal Kutuzov and Prince Bagration transformed into peasant generals, Alexander I alternatively ignored or vilified, and the war becoming a massive "People's War" fought by the ordinary people of Russia with almost no involvement on the part of the government. During the Cold War, many Western historians were inclined to see Russia as "the enemy", and there was a tendency to downplay and dismiss Russia's contributions to the defeat of Napoleon. As such, Napoleon's claim that the Russians did not defeat him and he was just the victim of fate in 1812 was very appealing to many Western historians.

Russian historians tended to focus on the French invasion of Russia in 1812 and ignore the campaigns in 1813–1814 fought in Germany and France, because a campaign fought on Russian soil was regarded as more important than campaigns abroad and because in 1812 the Russians were commanded by the ethnic Russian Kutuzov while in the campaigns in 1813–1814 the senior Russian commanders were mostly ethnic Germans, being either Baltic German nobility or Germans who had entered Russian service. At the time the conception held by the Russian elite was that the Russian empire was a multi-ethnic entity, in which the Baltic German aristocrats in service to the House of Romanov were considered part of that elite—an understanding of what it meant to be Russian defined in terms of dynastic loyalty rather than language, ethnicity, and culture that does not appeal to those later Russians who wanted to see the war as purely a triumph of ethnic Russians.

One consequence of this is that many Russian historians liked to disparage the officer corps of the Imperial Russian Army because of the high proportion of Baltic Germans serving as officers, which further reinforces the popular stereotype that the Russians won despite their officers rather than because of them. Furthermore, Emperor Alexander I often gave the impression at the time that he found Russia a place that was not worthy of his ideals, and he cared more about Europe as a whole than about Russia. Alexander's conception of a war to free Europe from Napoleon lacked appeal to many nationalist-minded Russian historians, who preferred to focus on a campaign in defence of the homeland rather than what Lieven called Alexander's rather "murky" mystical ideas about European brotherhood and security. Lieven observed that for every book written in Russia on the campaigns of 1813–1814, there are a hundred books on the campaign of 1812 and that the most recent Russian grand history of the war of 1812–1814 gave 490 pages to the campaign of 1812 and 50 pages to the campaigns of 1813–1814. Lieven noted that Tolstoy ended War and Peace in December 1812 and that many Russian historians have followed Tolstoy in focusing on the campaign of 1812 while ignoring the greater achievements of campaigns of 1813–1814 that ended with the Russians marching into Paris.

Napoleon did not touch serfdom in Russia. What the reaction of the Russian peasantry would have been if he had lived up to the traditions of the French Revolution, bringing liberty to the serfs, is an intriguing question.

=== German invasion ===
Academics have drawn parallels between the French invasion of Russia and Operation Barbarossa, the German invasion of 1941. David Stahel writes:

Historical comparisons reveal that many fundamental points that denote Hitler's failure in 1941 were actually foreshadowed in past campaigns. The most obvious example is Napoleon's ill-fated invasion of Russia in 1812. The German High Command's inability to grasp some of the essential hallmarks of this military calamity highlights another angle of their flawed conceptualization and planning in anticipation of Operation Barbarossa. Like Hitler, Napoleon was the conqueror of Europe and foresaw his war on Russia as the key to forcing England to make terms. Napoleon invaded with the intention of ending the war in a short campaign centred on a decisive battle in western Russia. As the Russians withdrew, Napoleon's supply lines grew and his strength was in decline from week to week. The poor roads and harsh environment took a deadly toll on both horses and men, while politically Russia's oppressed serfs remained, for the most part, loyal to the aristocracy. Worse still, while Napoleon defeated the Russian Army at Smolensk and Borodino, it did not produce a decisive result for the French and each time left Napoleon with the dilemma of either retreating or pushing deeper into Russia. Neither was really an acceptable option, the retreat politically and the advance militarily, but in each instance, Napoleon opted for the latter. In doing so the French emperor outdid even Hitler and successfully took Moscow in September 1812, but it counted for little when the Russians simply refused to acknowledge defeat and prepared to fight on through the winter. By the time Napoleon left Moscow to begin his infamous retreat, the Russian campaign was doomed.

The invasion by Germany was called the Great Patriotic War by the Soviet government, to evoke comparisons with the victory by Alexander I over Napoleon's invading army. In addition, the Germans, like the French, took solace from the notion they had been defeated by the Russian winter, rather than the Russians themselves or their own mistakes.

=== Cultural impact ===
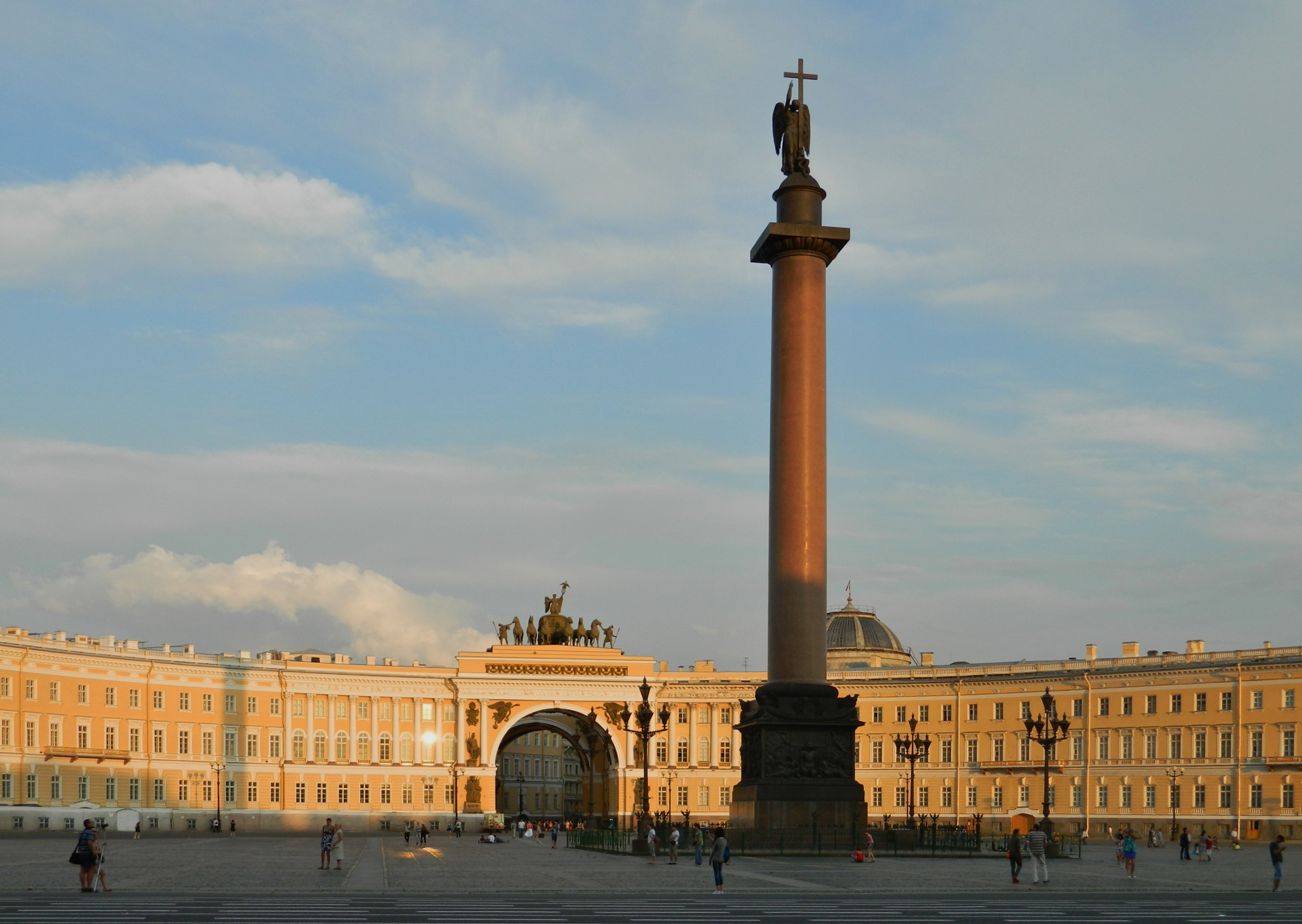
Palace Square with Alexander Column

An event of epic proportions and momentous importance for European history, the French invasion of Russia has been the subject of much discussion among historians. The campaign's sustained role in Russian popular culture may be seen in Leo Tolstoy's War and Peace, Pyotr Ilyich Tchaikovsky's 1812 Overture, and the identification of it with the German invasion during World War II, which became known as the Great Patriotic War in the Soviet Union.

== See also ==
- 1812 Overture, a piece of music written in 1882 (seventy years after the fact) by the Russian composer Tchaikovsky to commemorate the victory over Napoleon.
- Antony's Atropatene campaign, a Roman invasion of the Parthian Empire, which is widely compared to Napoleon's invasion of Russia.
- Arches of Triumph in Novocherkassk, a monument built in 1817 to commemorate the victory over the French.
- General Confederation of Kingdom of Poland
- Kutuzov (film)
- List of battles of the French invasion of Russia
- List of In Our Time programmes, including "Napoleon's retreat from Moscow"
- Nadezhda Durova
- Vasilisa Kozhina
- War and Peace (film series)
- War and Peace (opera), an opera by Prokofiev
