= Battle of Smolensk (1812) =

Battle of the French invasion of Russia

- Part of the French invasion of Russia
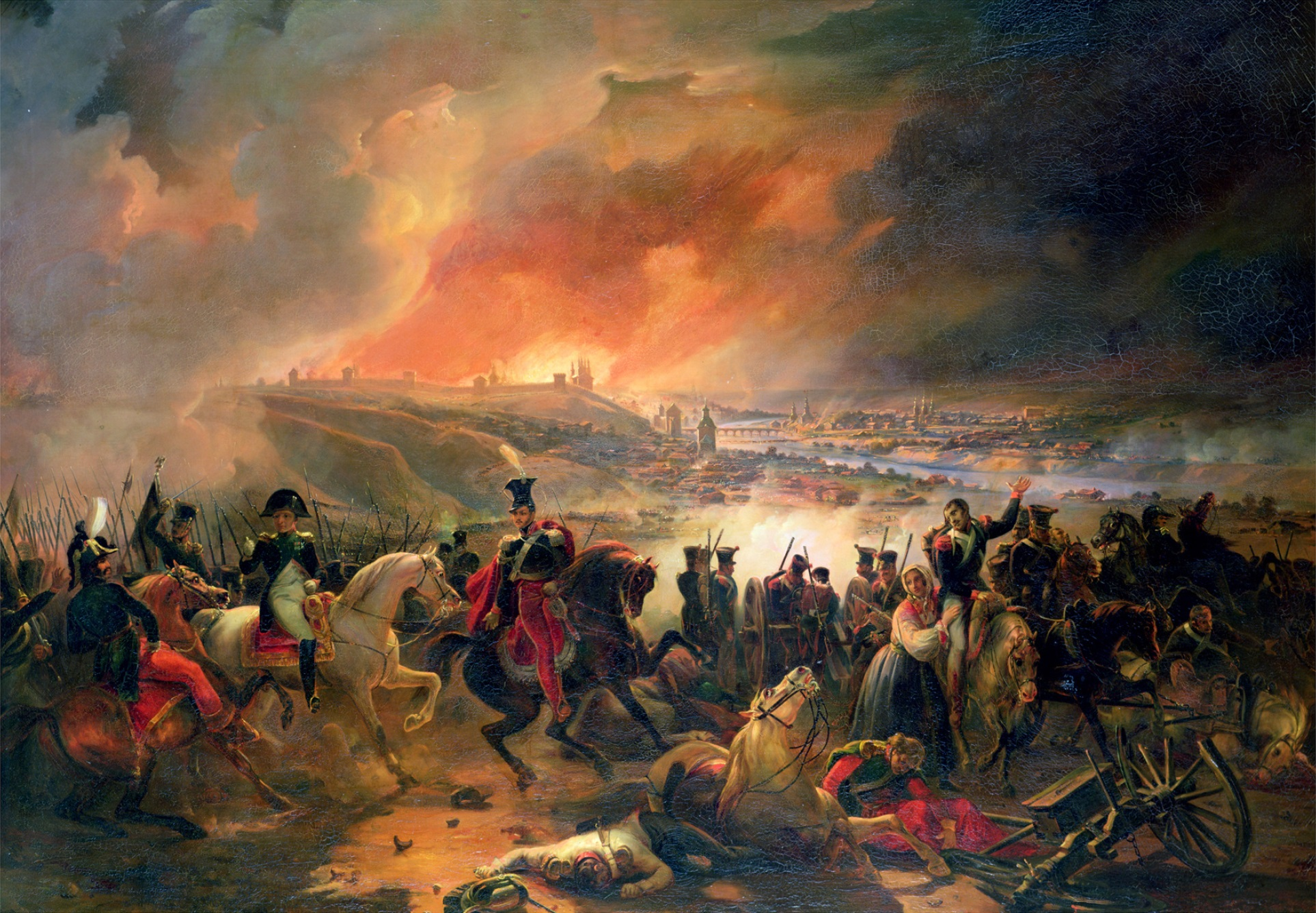
- The Battle of Smolensk; Jean-Charles Langlois, 1839
Date	16–18 August 1812
Location	Smolensk, Russia 54°46′N 32°02′E
Result	French victory

Belligerents
France; Duchy of Warsaw	Russia

Commanders and leaders
(First French Empire) Napoleon Bonaparte; Józef Poniatowski	(Russian Empire) Barclay de Tolly (Russian Empire) Pyotr Bagration (Russian Empire) Nikolay Raevsky (Russian Empire) Dmitry Dokhturov

Strength
180,000: 45,000 engaged	120,000: 30,000 engaged

Casualties and losses
9,000–10,000 killed, wounded or captured	6,000–14,000 killed, wounded or captured
- Location within Europe

French invasion of Russia
current battle
Prussian corps
Napoleon
Austrian corps

The Battle of Smolensk was the first major battle of the French invasion of Russia. It took place on 16–18 August 1812 (Note: Old Style date: 4–6 August 1812) and involved about 45,000 men of the Grande Armée under Emperor Napoleon I against about 30,000 Russian troops under General Barclay de Tolly. Napoleon occupied Smolensk by driving out Prince Pyotr Bagration's Second Army. The French artillery bombardment burned the city to the ground. Of 2,250 buildings, 84% were destroyed, leaving only 350 intact. Of the city's 15,000 inhabitants, about 1,000 were left at the end of the battle inside the smoking ruins. With over 15,000 casualties, it was one of the bloodiest battles of the invasion.

== Prelude ==
=== Vitebsk operation ===
The Russian First Western Army under General Michael Andreas Barclay de Tolly slipped away from Vitebsk on 27 July after an inconclusive fight against Emperor Napoleon, avoiding a general engagement. Napoleon was frustrated by his inability to bring the Russian army to battle and lingered at Vitebsk until 12 August to reform his Grande Armée and wait for stragglers to catch up. General Jean-Andoche Junot replaced King Jérôme as commander of the Westphalian VIII Corps and the Corps joined Napoleon's main army on 4 August near Orsha.

=== French situation ===
After five weeks of non-stop operations, the main 375,000-man strike force available to Napoleon had been reduced to 185,000 men by a host of factors. 90,000 troops under Marshal Nicolas Oudinot and Generals Laurent de Gouvion Saint-Cyr, Jean Reynier and Victor de Fay de La Tour-Maubourg had been detached for various missions. Russian forces had inflicted thousands of combat losses on Napoleon's main army, but the primary cause in the reduction of his force was strategic consumption—the need to garrison cities, towns, fortresses and forward supply depots.

Rapid forced marches and the inability of supply wagon trains led to high incidences of desertion and tens of thousands of losses to hunger and disease, most notably dysentery. The scorching July heat reduced the availability of water supplies. Huge numbers of cavalry horses and transportation horses and oxen had died due to a lack of grazing areas and the inability of the wagons to carry enough fodder.

=== Russian plan ===
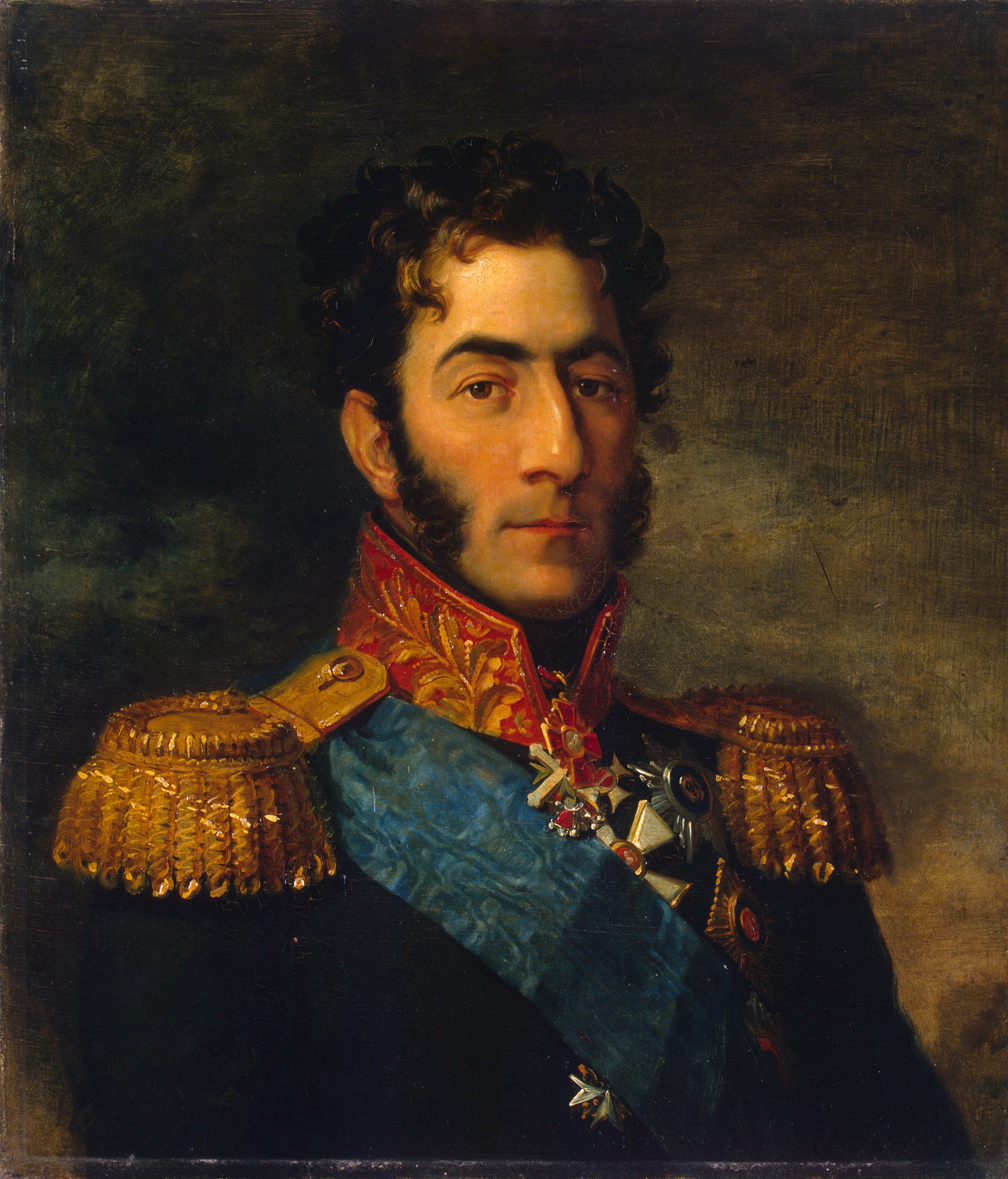
Prince Pyotr Bagration lobbied for an offensive against Napoleon's advancing army.

The loss of vast stretches of Russian territory to the advancing French led to a crisis and shift in power in the Russian high command. An aggressive "Russian" faction around Prince Pyotr Bagration called for an immediate, all-out attack against Napoleon. They were supported by Czar Alexander I and the bulk of the officer corps. The "foreign" faction around Barclay de Tolly, composed mostly of officers of German extraction, advocated the continuation of the present policy of delay and withdrawal to dilute Napoleon's striking power. Under strong pressure from above and below, including threats of force, Barclay agreed to an offensive on 6 August. Ignorant as to French dispositions, Barclay intended to outflank what he presumed to be the isolated corps of Viceroy Eugène de Beauharnais near Rudnia, destroy it, and inflict further losses on the French as they came to Eugéne's aid.

Barclay advanced on Rudnia and Poryeche on 7 August. Count Matvei Platov's Cossacks imposed a sharp defeat on General Horace Sébastiani's cavalry near Inkovo the same day, inflicting 600 French casualties. On 8 August, Barclay received false intelligence that Eugène's corps was at Poryeche and reoriented half of his army to face north. Platov was directed to rejoin Barclay's army and Bagration was to move to Vidra. Bagration disobeyed his orders, fearing French Marshal Louis-Nicolas Davout's threat to his left flank. He declared his army was hungry and sick and moved to Smolensk. Barclay failed to stop him, merely adjusting his own forces to compensate. On 11 August, Barclay stayed put and engaged only in outpost fighting with French cavalry under Neapolitan King Joachim. On 12 August, Barclay's scouts found Poryeche empty and he directed Platov to reconnoiter the French movements. The Russian offensive had failed due to disagreements among the generals, Barclay's inactivity and pointless marches that lost the Russians time they could not recover.

=== French plan ===
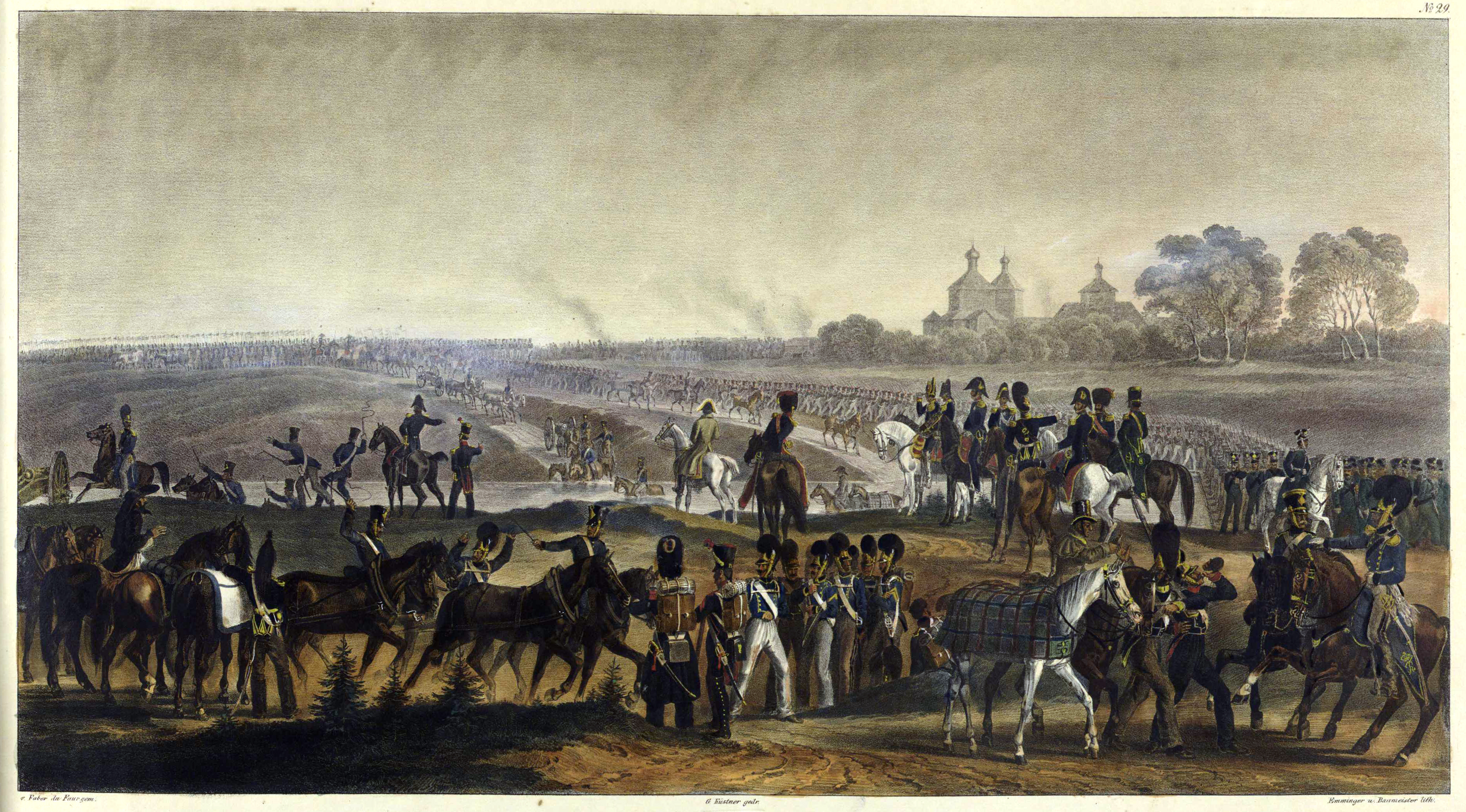
First Battle of Krasnoi; the Grande Armée crosses the Dnieper on 14 August by Christian Wilhelm von Faber du Faur.

Scheme of the Smolensk Kremlin, the remaining parts of the walls are shown in blue

Napoleon had expected a Russian offensive and saw in it a great opportunity to envelop and annihilate the Russian army. He directed Marshal Jacques MacDonald to cross the Daugava to help out Oudinot's force and ordered Oudinot and Saint-Cyr to attack Prince Peter Wittgenstein's 20,000-strong corps to prevent it from assisting Barclay. Napoleon came up with what became known as the Smolensk maneuver, a masterful operation designed to outflank Barclay from the south, cut off the Russians from Moscow and destroy the isolated Russian army, thus bringing the war to an end.

The action at Inkovo on 7 August was seen by Napoleon as heralding an immediate Russian attack. Worried, he deployed his army in a defensive posture around III Corps. By 10 August, Barclay's glacial slowness of operations had convinced Napoleon that the threat had passed. He proceeded with his maneuver. Vitebsk was garrisoned with a force of 3,800 men, which later grew to 7,000, to protect the French lines of communications. Napoleon did not know Barclay's exact location and was acting on instinct. The Grande Armée would advance in two huge columns commanded by Napoleon and Davout. Napoleon's column consisted of Joachim Murat's cavalry, the Imperial Guard, III Corps and IV Corps. It would cross the Dnieper at Rosasna. Davout's column would cross at Orsha, composed of I Corps, V Corps and VIII Corps. This giant force would advance east along the left bank of the Dnieper, swing north to cut the Smolensk-Moscow road and annihilate the isolated Russians. Latour-Maubourg's cavalry would attack down the Dnieper as a diversion. Napoleon's deployment remained hidden from the Russians due to a thick cavalry screen under Generals Emmanuel de Grouchy, Étienne de Nansouty and Louis-Pierre Montbrun. French engineers under General Jean Baptiste Eblé erected four pontoon bridges across the Dnieper near Rosasna on the night of 13–14 August and by daybreak the 175,000-strong Grande Armée was advancing rapidly toward Smolensk.

=== Battle of Krasnoi ===
Barclay had left Generalmajor Neverovsky's 27th Division to guard Krasny (Krasnoi; Krasnoy), along with some cavalry and artillery. This force of 5,500–7,200 infantry, 1,500 cavalry and 10–14 guns was attacked by 20,000 Frenchmen under Murat and Marshal Michel Ney beginning around 2:30 PM on 14 August. Murat's and Ney's inability to coordinate their infantry-cavalry operations allowed the Russians to get away, at the cost of 1,500–2,300 Russian men and seven guns as well as 500 French casualties. The French had multiple excellent chances in the First Battle of Krasnoi to annihilate the Russians but failed to do so. Neverovsky retreated into Smolensk, shutting the gates behind him. The French inability to capture the city on the fly imposed a disastrous delay on their operations. Neverovsky requested reinforcements from Bagration and received Nikolai Raevsky's VII Corps, which arrived on the morning of 15 August to defend the southern bank of the Dnieper near Smolensk.

Barclay learned of the French attack from Neverovsky. He interpreted Napoleon's offensive as a retreat and prepared to capture Vitebsk. He ordered Bagration to move south along the Dnieper. Bagration refused, pointing out that Smolensk, Neverovsky and Raevsky were in grave danger. He then received permission from Barclay to deploy to the Dnieper's southern bank at Katan. Barclay ordered General Dmitry Dokhturov's corps to join Bagration and directed the Smolensk governor to evacuate the city archives. No decisive action was undertaken by Barclay due to uncertainty about Napoleon's locations. Czar Alexander left the army and turned over command of the armies to Barclay, ordering him to defend Smolensk. Barclay decided to rush his and Bagration's men down the road from Vitebsk to Smolensk. With his entire plan of operations hanging in the balance, Napoleon failed to act with sufficient vigor and ordered a 24-hour halt to the advance instead.

== Battle ==
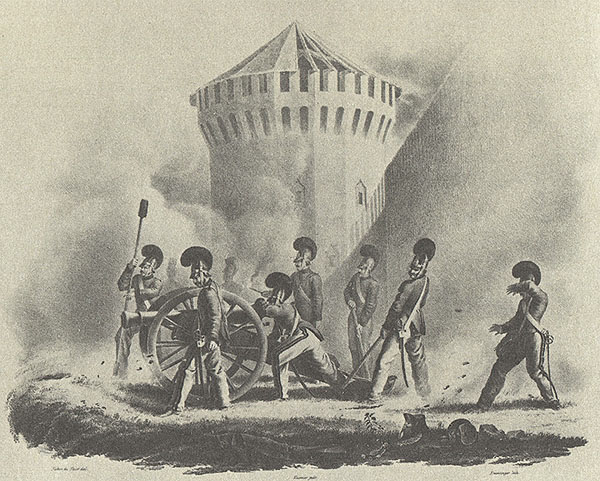
Württemberg artillery in action at Smolensk on 18 August by Faber du Faur

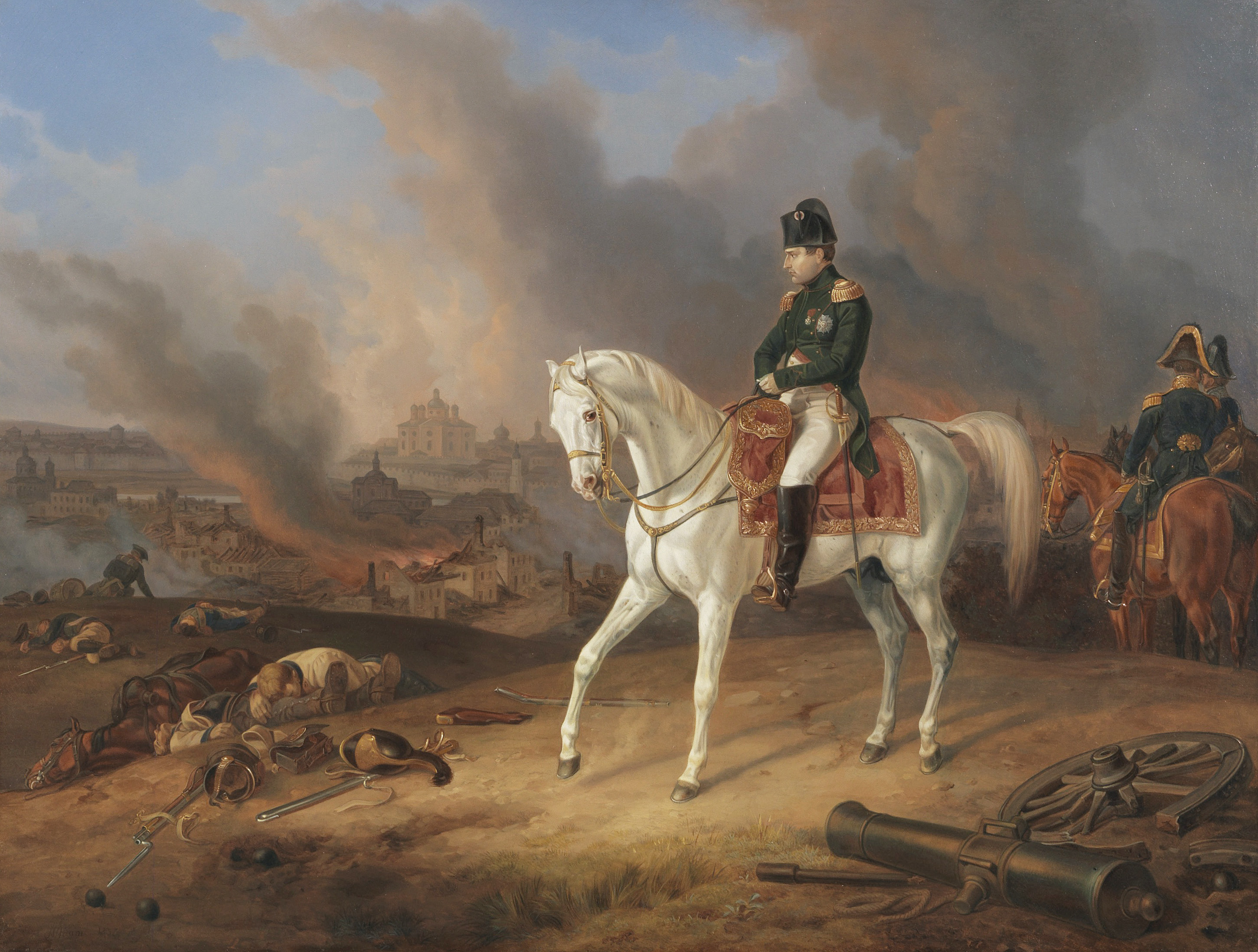
Napoleon before burning Smolensk. Oil on canvas by Albrecht Adam (1836)

Smolensk, a historic fortress city with a population of 12,600, resides along the primary Western route linking Warsaw to Moscow. Prior to the First Partition of Poland, it stood as a border town within the Russian Empire. The formidable Smolensk Kremlin, encompassed by 38 bastion towers and a sturdy stone wall, served as a significant stronghold. To the south, the River Dnieper flows adjacent to this fortified kremlin. Napoleon's anticipation presumed that the Russians would engage outside Smolensk to shield the city from potential destruction. (The Assumption Cathedral in Smolensk housed one of the most venerated icons of the Eastern Orthodox Church, Our Lady of Smolensk attributed to St Luke.) However, by August 16, French forces encountered a heavily fortified city defended by Bagration's troops. The defenses were further reinforced by the subsequent arrival of Barclay and the main Russian army.

The main battle was fought on 16 August. An initial probing force captured two suburbs but failed to bring the Russians out to battle. Napoleon ordered a general assault with three corps of the Grande Armée, supported by two hundred artillery pieces. This was initially successful, the intense artillery bombardment setting the city on fire. French forces lacked ladders or climbing apparatus to scale the city walls and were under counter fire from Russian artillery. By nightfall, most of the city was burning.

So, as soon as day broke —we marched against the city. The river was crossed below the city. The suburbs on the northern side were stormed, set on fire, and burned up. My company's doctor, named Staüble, had his arm shot away in crossing the stream, and he died afterward. No longer could I pay any attention to my comrades and, therefore, knew not in what way they perished or were lost. Everyone fired and struck at the enemy in wild madness, and no one could tell whether he was in front, in the middle, or behind the center of the army.

To save the army, Barclay de Tolly abandoned the city destroying all ammunition stores and bridges leaving a small force to hold out for two days to cover his retreat. Around dawn on 17 August, Grande Armée Polish forces successfully breached the walls, and in a few hours the main French forces entered the city. Barclay retained forces on the other side of the river preventing a crossing until the night of August the 18th. The city was almost completely destroyed.

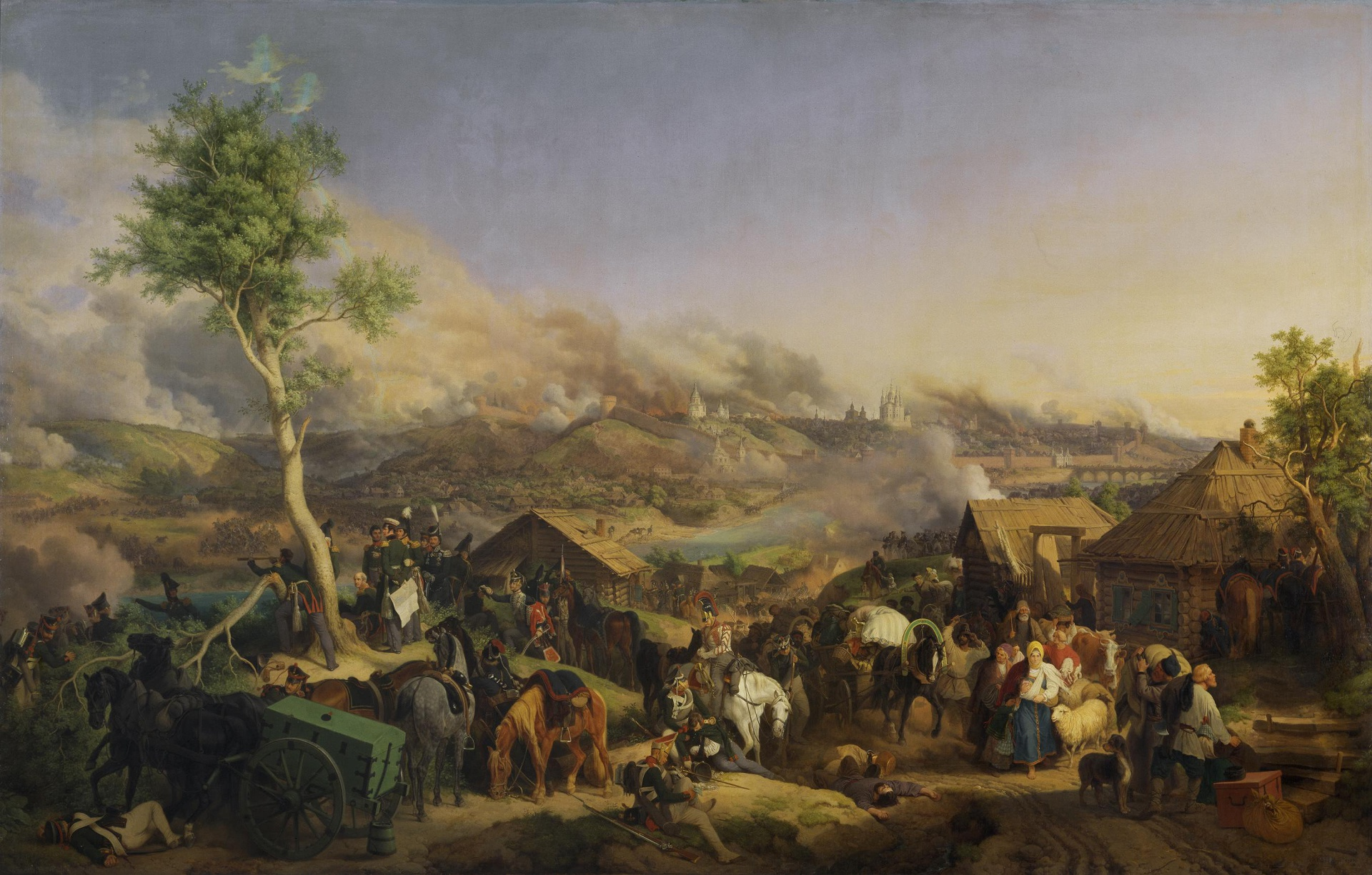
The Battle of Smolensk by Peter von Hess, 1846

=== Casualties ===
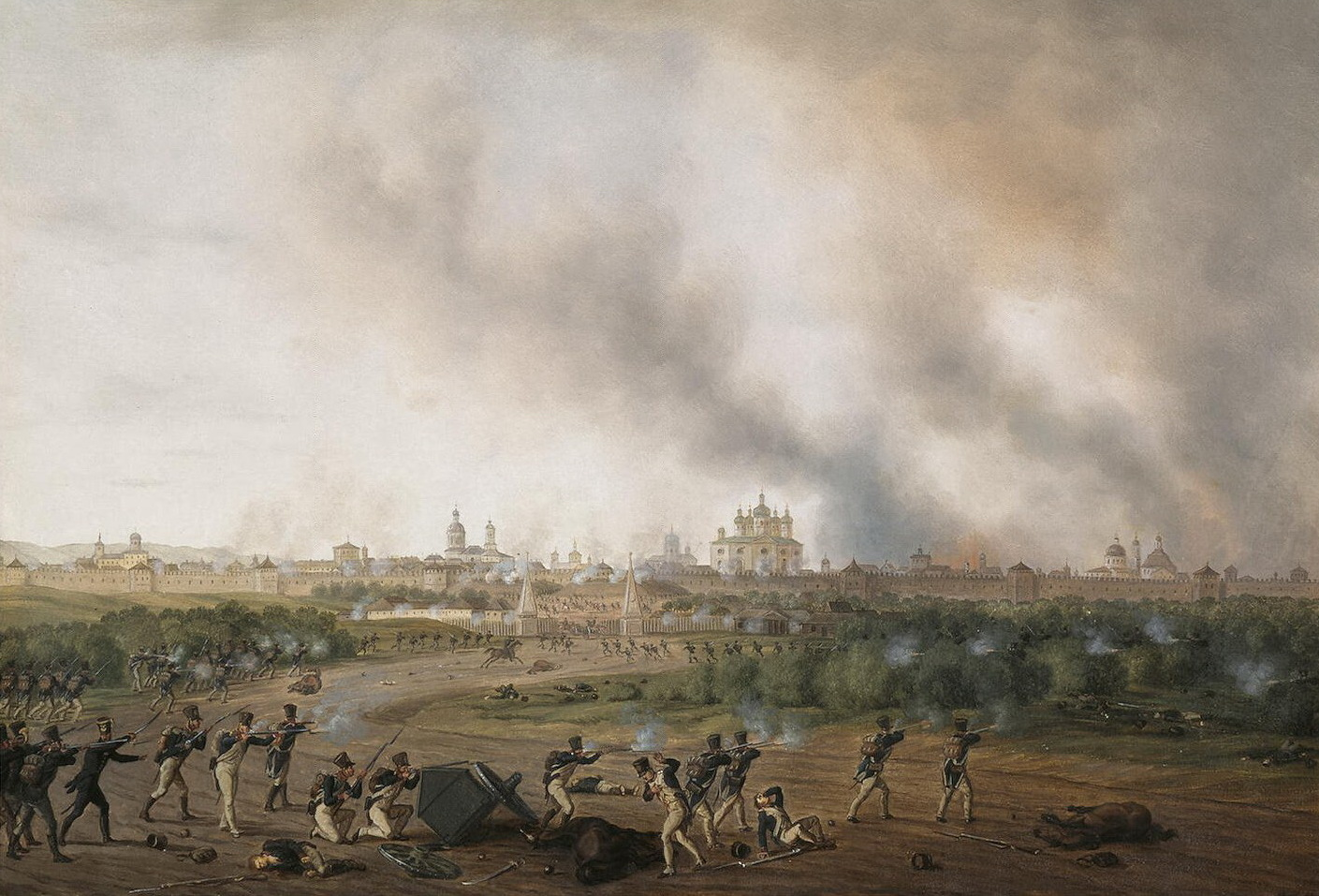
Battle of Smolensk on 18 August 1812, by Albrecht Adam

Barclay de Tolly claimed 4,000 Russian casualties, while Bogdanovich spoke of 6,000 hors de combat. Docturov's VI Corps had 16,800 men available prior to the battle but only 6,000 capable of combat at its end, which would mean 10,800 casualties for one Russian corps alone. Prince Eugen of Württemberg's division lost 1,300 men alone. Gaston Bodart gave 6,000. whilst David Chandler estimates them as 12,000–14,000. Alexander Mikaberidze suggests 10,000 Russian casualties at Smolensk.

Napoleon claimed 700 French killed and 3,100–3,200 wounded. His estimate is disputed, as I Corps alone under Lobau lost 6,000. Chandler puts French losses at 10,000, while Mikaberidze also suggested 10,000. Bodart listed 10,000. Russian authors claimed the French losses were as high as 20,000.

== Aftermath ==
The Tsar replaced the unpopular Barclay de Tolly with Kutuzov, who took over the army on 29 August at Tsaryovo Zaymishche and ordered his men to prepare for battle. Kutuzov understood that Barclay's decision to retreat had been correct, but the Tsar, the Russian troops and Russia could not accept further retreat. His order to search for a battleground eastwards led subsequently to the Battle of Lubino and Borodino.

== Legacy ==
The Battle of Smolensk is commemorated on the Tomb of the Unknown Soldier in Warsaw, with the inscription SMOLENSK 17 VIII 1812.

== See also ==
- Jean-Victor Poncelet
- Jakob Walter

== Notes ==
Preceded by Battle of Gorodechno	Napoleonic Wars; Battle of Smolensk (1812)	Succeeded by First Battle of Polotsk
