= First Battle of Krasnoi =

Battle between France & Russia

- Part of the French invasion of Russia
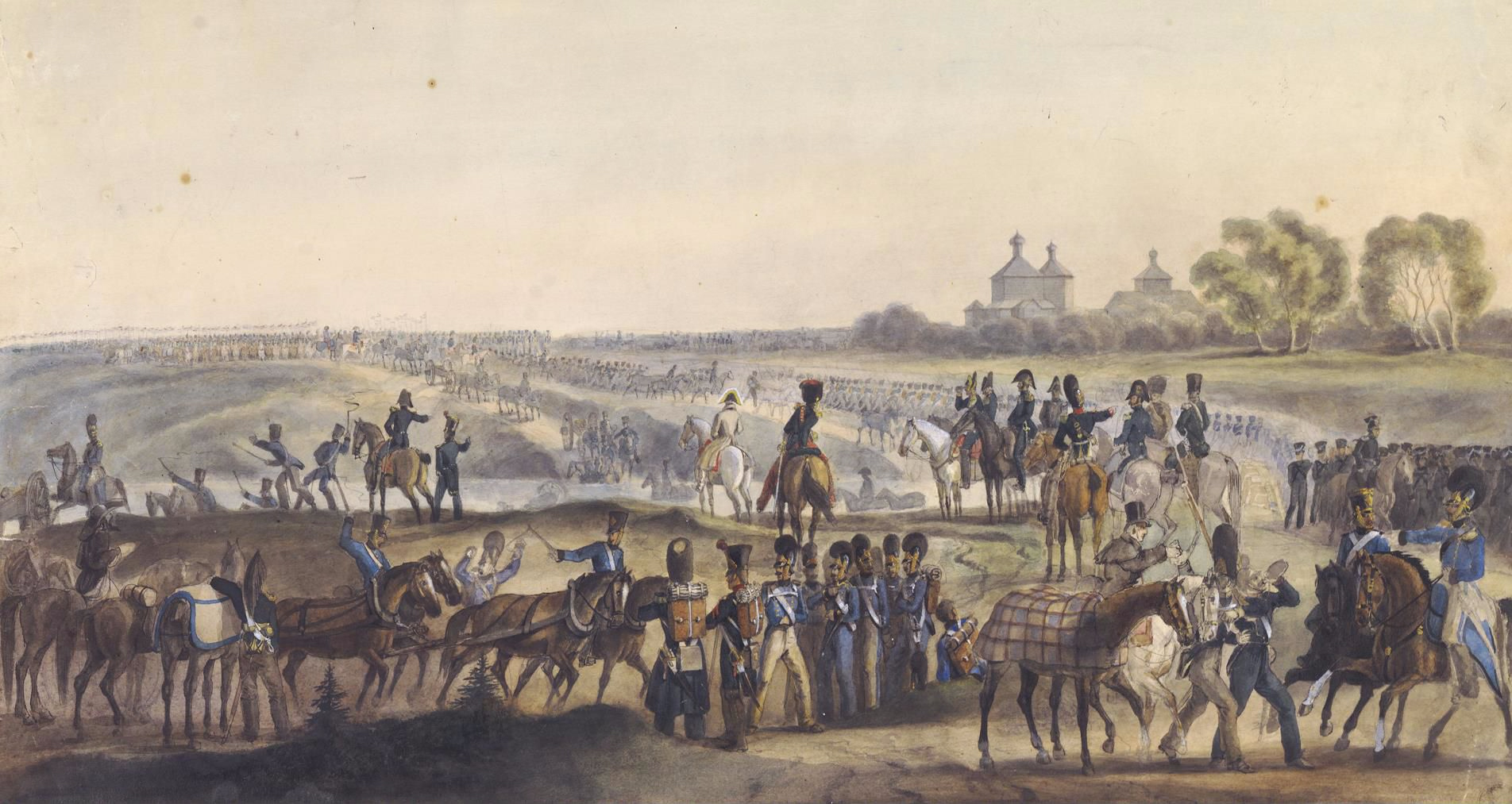
- The crossing of the Dniepr by Christian Wilhelm von Faber du Faur
Date	14 August 1812
Location	Krasnoi, southwest of Smolensk, Russian Empire 54°33′22″N 31°25′29″E
Result	French victory

Belligerents
(First French Empire) French Empire	Russian Empire

Commanders and leaders
(First French Empire) Michel Ney (First French Empire) Joachim Murat	(Russian Empire) Dmitry Neverovsky (Russian Empire) Pyotr Bagration (Note: Strategic control)

Strength
approx. 20,000 (Note: Including Murat's 15,000 cavalry and Ney's 5,000 infantry. Bodart claimed ca. 20,000 total for Ney and Murat.) • 15,000 cavalry • 5,000 infantry	6,000–7,000 • up to 5,500 infantry • up to 1,500 cavalry 14 cannon

Casualties and losses
500	700 killed or wounded 800 captured 7 cannon

French invasion of Russia
current battle
Prussian corps
Napoleon
Austrian corps

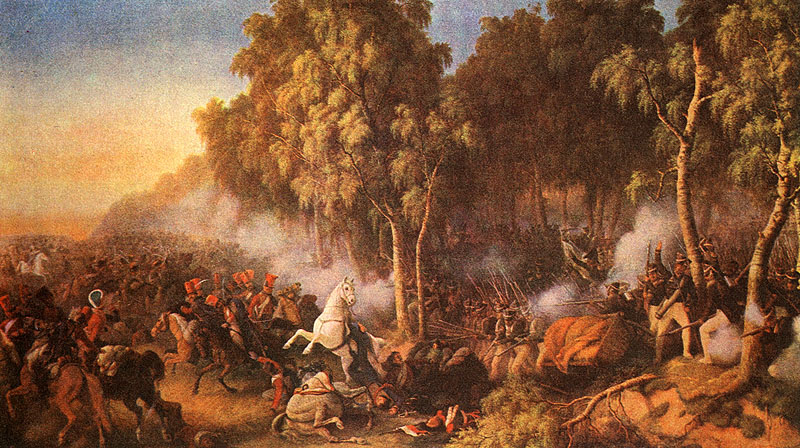
Battle of Krasnoi on 14 August 1812; painting by Peter von Hess

The First Battle of Krasnoi was fought on 14 August [O.S. 2 August] 1812 at Krasny between Ney and Murat's French troops and Neverovsky's Russian division, which consisted largely of fresh conscript soldiers. It was part of the French invasion of Russia.

It ended with a victory for the French, but the Russians retreated in good order to Smolensk, having managed to close the city gates before the upcoming battle, when reinforcements would arrive for Neverovsky and a decisive French success would be prevented.

== Prelude ==
Bagration had reinforced Neverovsky's division with some cavalry and left it at an advance position around Krasnoi (Krasny) to cover westwards in the direction of Orsha.

== Battle ==
Ney's infantry in cooperation with Murat's cavalry drove him out of Krasnoi and captured part of his artillery, the first trophies of the entire campaign. Neverovsky assembled his 5,500 to 6,000 infantrymen into a huge square Murat's cavalry could not break. The square moved across the field over a palisade fence and Murat's cavalry could not follow. Neverovsky's troops were able to get away in good order but left 1,500 men behind.

Battle maps

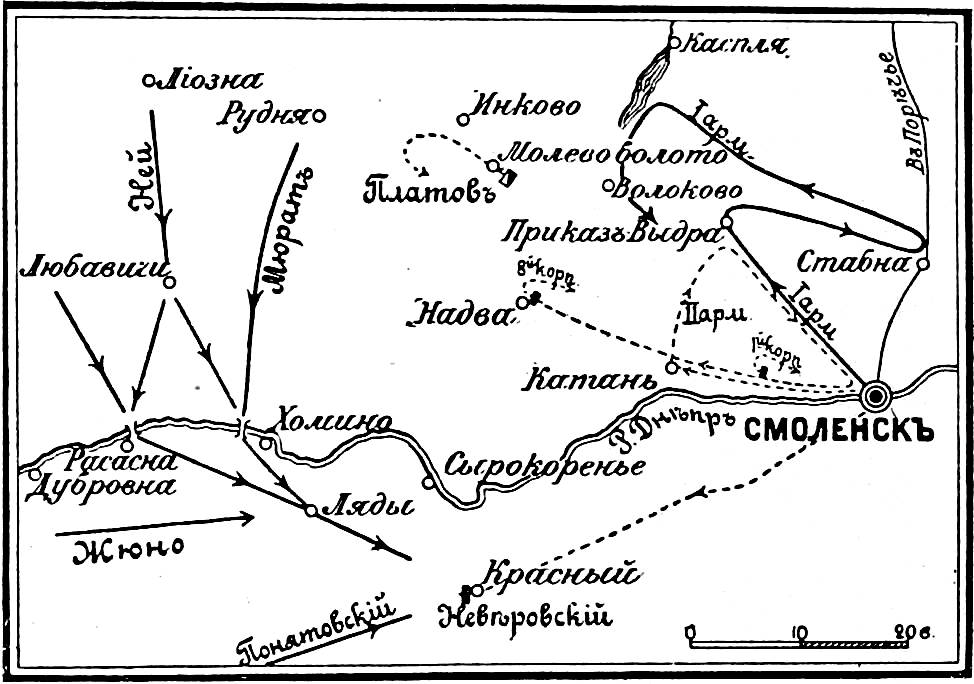
Battle of Krasnoi August 2nd (14) 1812. (Sketch of troop movements)

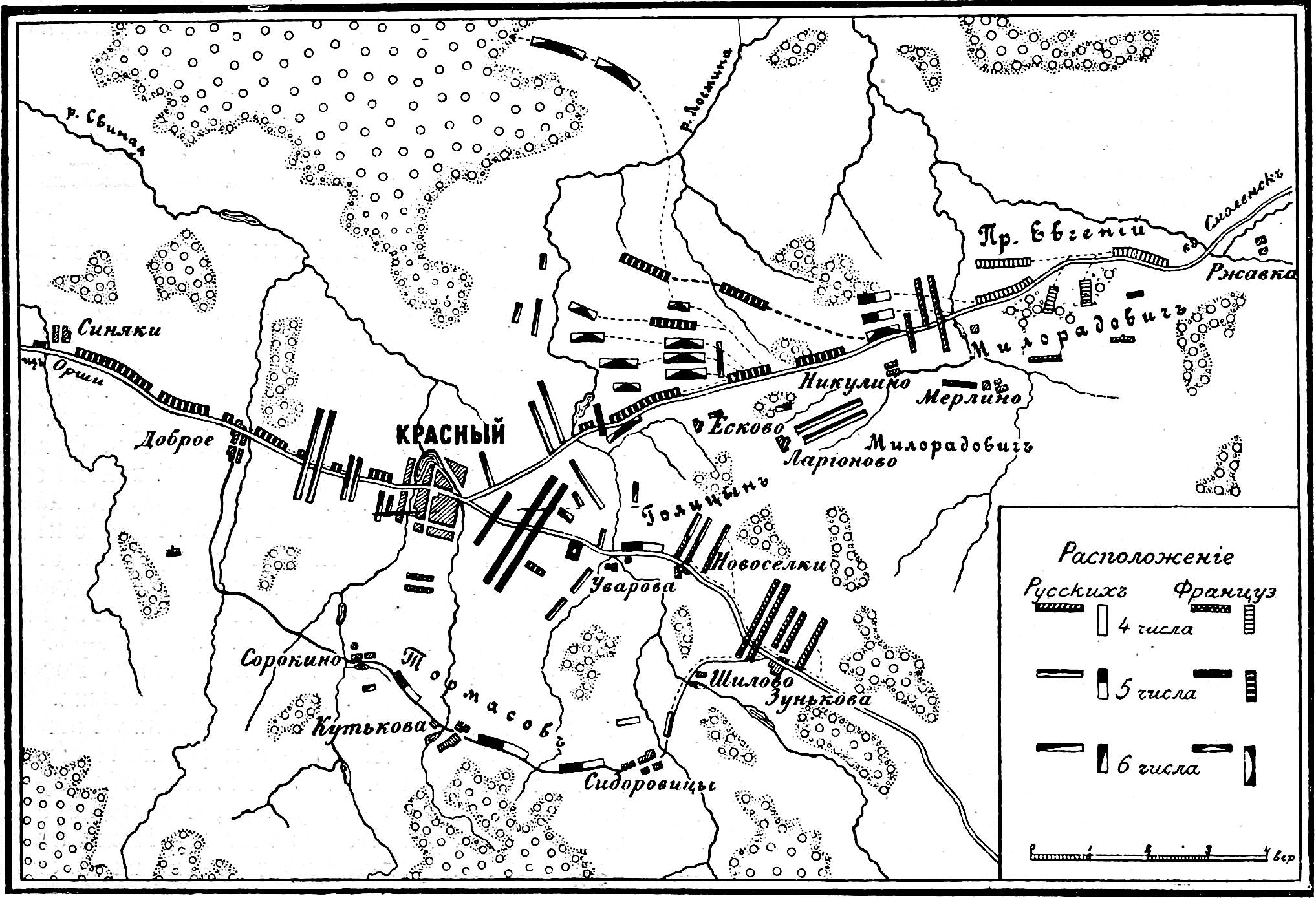
Battle of Krasnoi August 2nd (14) 1812. (Map of troop movements)

== Aftermath ==
Neverovsky returned to Smolensk and reported. The battle of Smolensk started only two days later.

== See also ==
- "Second" Battle of Krasny mid-November 1812
- List of battles of the French invasion of Russia
