= Battle of Valutino =

1812 battle during the French invasion of Russia

- Part of the French invasion of Russia
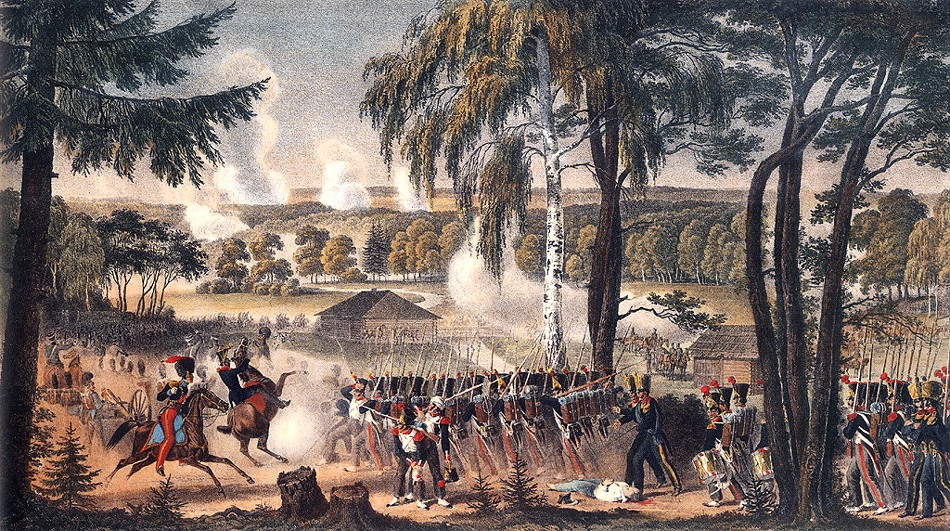
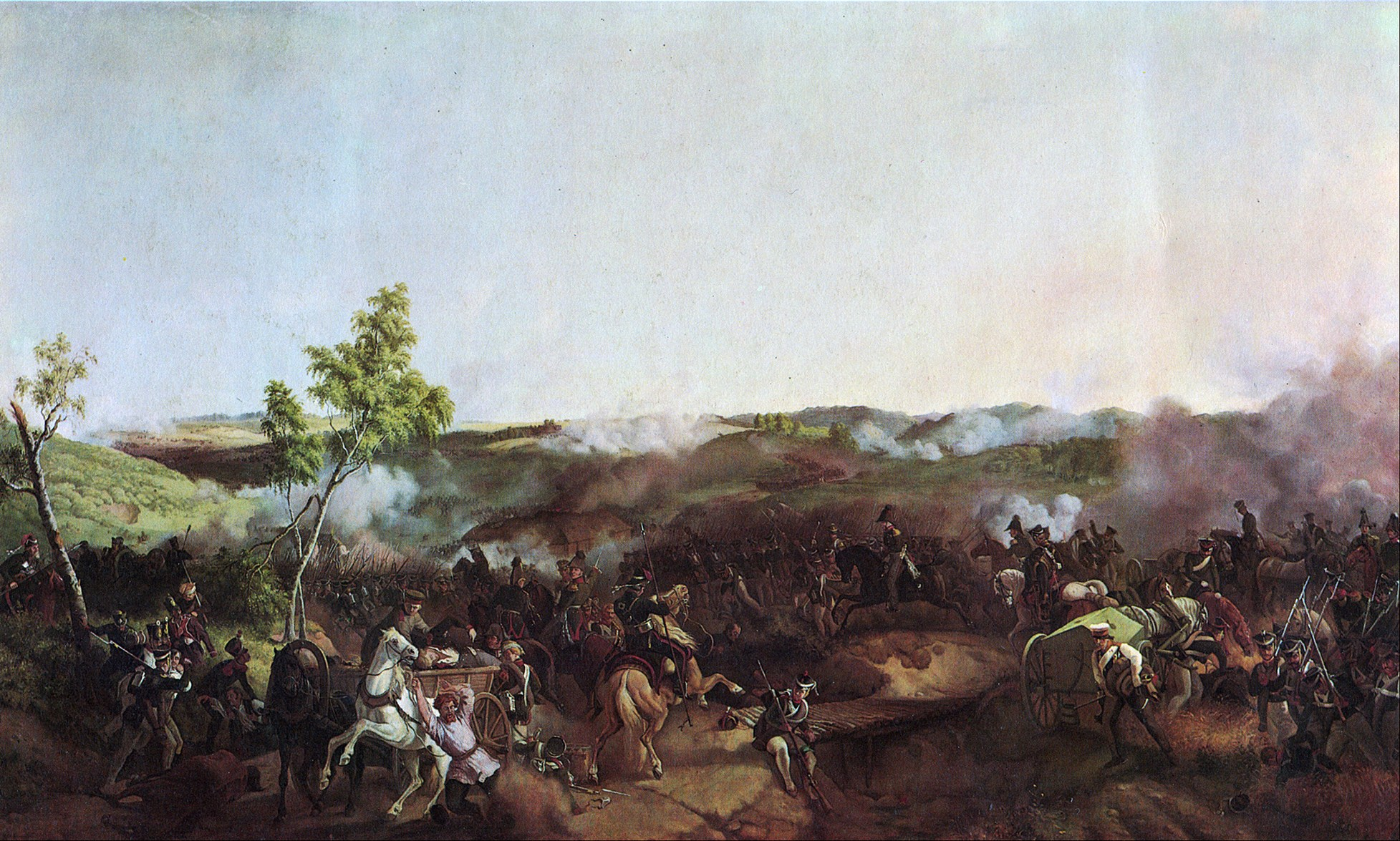
- French infantry at the Battle of Valutino, by Christian Wilhelm von Faber du Faur (left painting), and another depiction of the battle by Peter von Hess (right)
Date	19 August 1812 (Note: 7 August according to the old style)
Location	Near Smolensk, Russian Empire 54.8231°N 32.2411°E
Result	Indecisive (Note: The French captured the Russian positions, but were unable to prevent the corps from moving to the compound in Moscow.)

Belligerents
(First French Empire) French Empire	Russian Empire

Commanders and leaders
(First French Empire) Michel Ney (First French Empire) Jean-Andoche Junot (First French Empire) Charles Gudin †	(Russian Empire) Barclay de Tolly (Russian Empire) Nikolay Tuchkov (Russian Empire) Aleksey Yermolov

Strength
35,000	25,000

Casualties and losses
7,000–9,000 (Note: 8,800)	6,000

French invasion of Russia
current battle
Prussian corps
Napoleon
Austrian corps

The Battle of Valutino (also called the battle of Lubino) (Note: Russian: Битва у Валутиной горы, lit. 'Battle of Valutino Mountain', French: Bataille de Valutino) took place on 19 August 1812 near Valutino^{[ru]} and Lubino^{[ru]}, between a corps of French and allied troops led by Marshal Ney, about 35,000 strong, and a strong rear-guard of General Barclay de Tolly's Russian army of about 25,000, commanded by the general himself. The Russians were strongly posted in marshy ground, protected by a small stream, about 20 kilometres (12 mi) east of Smolensk. The French, attacking resolutely, captured the Russian position in the face of considerable physical obstacles; the Russian army, however, did not intend to determinately defend this position, because at the time of the battle it was in a general retreat deep into the territory as part of a scorched earth strategy.

== Prelude ==
Napoleon's hopes of trapping General Barclay's army were dashed when he discovered that the Russian force awaiting the French was a rearguard under General Tuchkov. Barclay's main force of three infantry and one cavalry corps was strung out near Smolensk, trying to get away from the French after the Battle of Smolensk. The rearguard then turned around to fight the French on the Stragan river.

== Battle ==
After a heavy bombardment, Ney launched an assault against the Russians, crossing the Stragan but failing to capture the crest. Murat's cavalry attacks were bogged down in marshy ground and accomplished nothing. General Junot's force was close to the battlefield and was urged to attack the Russians by Murat. Junot did not engage, and the opportunity for a decisive victory passed.

When Napoleon heard of Junot's failure to attack, they had been friends since their early twenties, he is said to have shouted in frustration "[Junot] will now never earn his Marshal's Baton!"

A few hours later, Ney launched the last French attack. General Gudin led the assault and was hit by a cannonball, which removed one leg. He died three days later from infection. Gudin's attack was repulsed also thanks to reinforcements in the form of 3rd and 4th Corps sent by General Yermolov (the chief of staff) to General Tuchkov. The French still managed to capture the crest after hard fighting. By that point the majority of Barclay's army had escaped and was heading towards Lubino.

== Aftermath ==
The French suffered around 7,000-8,800 casualties. The Russians lost about 6,000. Napoleon was furious after the battle, realizing that another good chance to trap and destroy the Russian army had been lost.

== See also ==
- List of battles of the French invasion of Russia

== Notes ==
Preceded by First Battle of Polotsk	Napoleonic Wars; Battle of Valutino	Succeeded by Battle of Mesoten
