= Krasny, Krasninsky District, Smolensk Oblast =

Krasny Красный
- Settlement
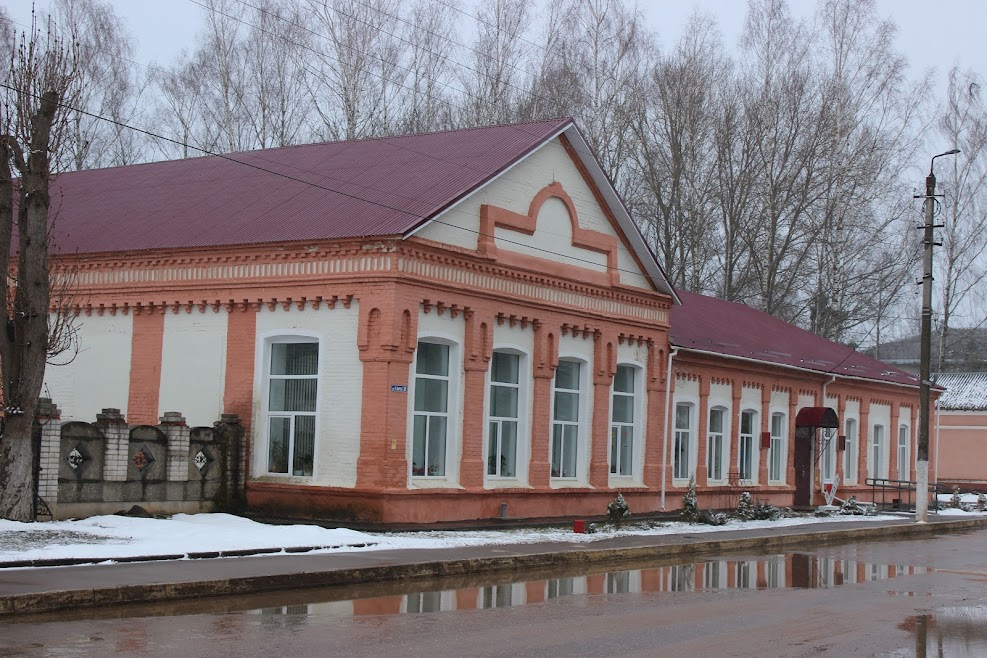

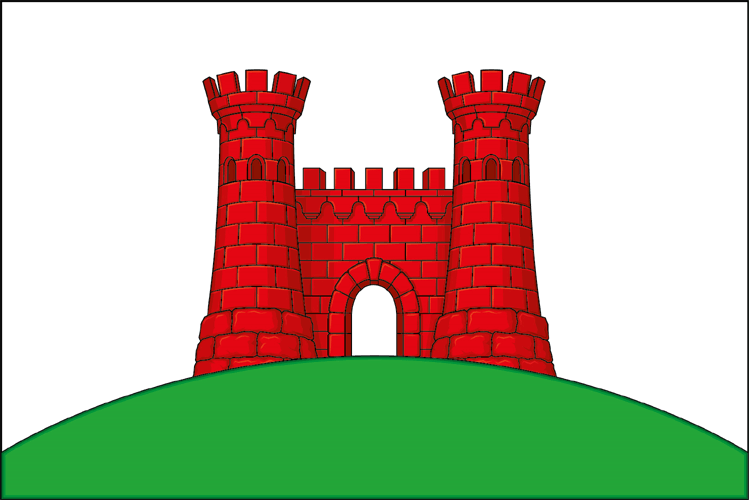
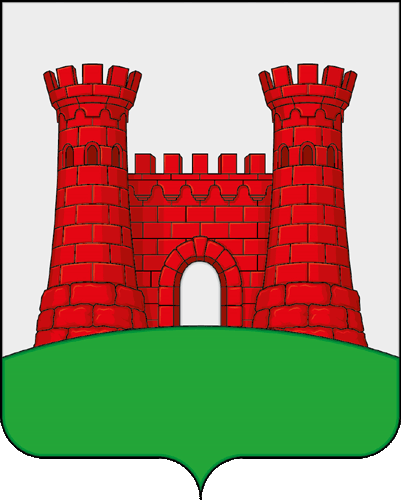
- Flag Coat of arms
- Interactive map of Krasny
- Location of Krasny Krasny (Smolensk Oblast)
- Coordinates: 54°33′36″N 31°25′48″E
- Country: Russia
- Federal subject: Smolensk Oblast
- Administrative district: Krasninsky District
- Urban settlementSelsoviet: Krasninskoye
- Founded: 1165 (Julian)

Population (2010 Census)
  - Total: 4,349
  - Estimate (2024): 3,424 (−21.3%)

Administrative status
  - Capital of: Krasninskoye Urban Settlement

Municipal status
  - Municipal district: Krasninsky Municipal District
  - Urban settlement: Krasninskoye Urban Settlement
  - Capital of: Krasninsky Municipal District
- Time zone: UTC+3 (MSK)
- Postal code: 216100
- OKTMO ID: 66624151051

Krasny (Russian: Кра́сный) is an urban locality (an urban-type settlement) and the administrative center of Krasninsky District of Smolensk Oblast, Russia, located at the confluence of the Svinaya and the Mereyka Rivers 67 kilometers (42 mi) southwest of Smolensk. Population: 4,349 (2010 census); 4,714 (2002 census); 5,087 (1989 Soviet census).

== History ==
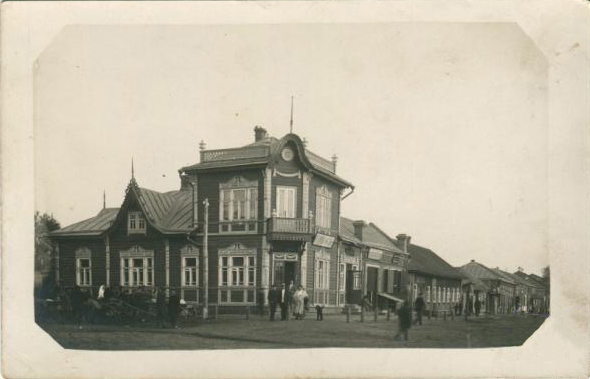
Early 20th-century view of the town

Krasny (originally Krasn or Krasen) is first mentioned in 1165 by the Hypatian Codex, when Davyd Rostislavich, Prince of Smolensk, gave Krasen to his nephew, Roman of Vitebsk. In 1404 it became part of the Grand Duchy of Lithuania, then in 1516 it passed to the Grand Duchy of Moscow, and in 1618 it passed to the Polish–Lithuanian Commonwealth, within which it was administratively located in the Smolensk Voivodeship. In 1654, it was finally transferred to the Tsardom of Russia.

In the course of the administrative reform carried out in 1708 by Peter the Great, the area was included into Smolensk Governorate and remained there until 1929, with the exception of the brief period between 1775 and 1796, when Smolensk Governorate was transformed into Smolensk Viceroyalty. The area belonged to Krasninsky Uyezd, which was established in 1775. In 1776, Krasny was granted town status. In 1796, the uyezd was abolished but it was re-established in 1802.

During the French invasion of Russia, Krasny played an important role, since the French army passed it twice en route to and from Russia. The First Battle of Krasnoi (Krasny) in August 1812 was a lesser action of Ney and Murat's advance guard against the small retreating Russian rearguard of Dmitry Neverovsky. The French ran into unexpectedly strong resistance from the Russians. In his Napoleonic history, de Ségur wrote that Neverovsky retreated "like a lion".

At the Battle of Krasnoi in November 1812, the Russian army inflicted heavy losses on the remnants of the French Grande Armée. There are two monuments in Krasny commemorating that event, both erected in 1912.

Historical population
Year	Pop.	±%
1863	2,760	—
1897	2,753	−0.3%
1989	5,087	+84.8%
2002	4,714	−7.3%
2010	4,349	−7.7%

In 1897, the ethnic make-up, by mother tongue, was 46.3% Russian, 46.2% Belarusian, 5.7% Jewish and 1.0% Polish.

On 12 July 1929, governorates and uyezds were abolished, and Krasninsky District with the administrative center in Krasny was established. Krasny did not retain the town status during Soviet times. The district belonged to Smolensk Okrug of Western Oblast. On August 1, 1930, the okrugs were abolished, and the districts were subordinated directly to the oblast. On 27 September 1937 Western Oblast was abolished and split between Oryol and Smolensk Oblasts. Krasninsky District was transferred to Smolensk Oblast. Between 1941 and 1943, during WWII, Krasny was occupied by German troops. On 1 February 1963, during the abortive Khrushchyov administrative reform, Krasninsky District was merged into Smolensky District, but in 1965 it was re-established.

== Climate ==
Krasny has a warm-summer humid continental climate (Dfb in the Köppen climate classification).

Climate data for Krasny
Month	Jan	Feb	Mar	Apr	May	Jun	Jul	Aug	Sep	Oct	Nov	Dec	Year
Mean daily maximum °C (°F)	−4.1 (24.6)	−3.3 (26.1)	2.3 (36.1)	11.2 (52.2)	17.4 (63.3)	20.7 (69.3)	23.1 (73.6)	21.8 (71.2)	16.1 (61.0)	8.8 (47.8)	2.7 (36.9)	−1.3 (29.7)	9.6 (49.3)
Daily mean °C (°F)	−6.1 (21.0)	−5.7 (21.7)	−1.1 (30.0)	6.7 (44.1)	13.2 (55.8)	16.8 (62.2)	19.2 (66.6)	17.9 (64.2)	12.5 (54.5)	6.2 (43.2)	1.0 (33.8)	−3.1 (26.4)	6.5 (43.6)
Mean daily minimum °C (°F)	−8.5 (16.7)	−8.7 (16.3)	−4.8 (23.4)	1.7 (35.1)	8.0 (46.4)	11.9 (53.4)	14.6 (58.3)	13.6 (56.5)	8.7 (47.7)	3.5 (38.3)	−1.0 (30.2)	−5.0 (23.0)	2.8 (37.1)
Average precipitation mm (inches)	53 (2.1)	47 (1.9)	46 (1.8)	48 (1.9)	76 (3.0)	84 (3.3)	98 (3.9)	78 (3.1)	64 (2.5)	67 (2.6)	57 (2.2)	51 (2.0)	769 (30.3)
Source: https://en.climate-data.org/asia/russian-federation/smolensk-oblast/krasny-31405/

== Economy ==
Industry includes flax and dairy processing, vegetable processing, and manufacture of drainage pipes.

=== Transportation ===
Krasny has access to M1 "Belarus" Highway and is additionally connected by paved roads with Smolensk and with Orsha (so called Old Smolensk Road).

== Culture and recreation ==
In Krasny, there is a museum of local lore, whose three exhibits include materials on the Patriotic War of 1812, Great Patriotic War of 1941–1945, and on modern life at the settlement.

On September 27, 2009, the "Walk of Heroes" history museum opened in Krasny.
