= Charles Auguste Creutzer =

Brigadier-General Charles Auguste Creutzer (French pronunciation: [ʃaʁl oɡyst kʁɔitsa]; 1780–1832) was a French officer in Napoleon's Army.

== Biography ==
Charles-Auguste Creutzer was born on 1 April 1780 in Deux-Ponts (French derivation, more commonly known as Zweibrücken, now in the Rhineland-Palatinate in Germany) which passed from the Palatinate-Birkenfeld-Zweibrücken at the time of his birth to Bavaria in 1799.

Creutzer joined French military service 22 December 1799 with the guides of the Army of the Rhine (Guides de l'Armée du Rhin). He was promoted to corporal (brigadier) of the 11th Dragoons on 21 April 1800, he distinguished himself at the Battle of Memmingen on 10 May of that year, earning another promotion to sergeant (maréchal des logis) on 13 May by General Claude-Jacques Lecourbe. On 19 June, in an attack on the village of Schowningen he charged the enemy with 5 hussars and captured 16 soldiers, including an officer, earning him yet another promotion, this time to second lieutenant (sous-lieutenant) on 23 June (provisionally, confirmed by the Consulate on 12 December 1800) by Jean Victor Marie Moreau, the commanding general.

Creutzer next became an aide de camp to General Gudin 20 July 1800 (provisionally, confirmed on 20 July 1801), a lieutenant 10 July 1801, served in the Army of the Coast (L'armée des côtes de l'Océan) 1804–1805, with the Grand Army (Grande Armée) 1805–1807 (promoted to Captain 4 March 1807), with the Army of Germany (L'armée d'Allemagne) in 1808, where he was promoted to colonel (chef d'escadron) on 16 June 1809.

Creutzer served on the general staff during the Russian Campaign of 1812 and in Saxony in 1813. On 4 August 1813 Creutzer was promoted to brigadier-general (general de brigade) and given command of the 2nd brigade of the division of Régis Barthélemy Mouton-Duvernet in the XIV Corps of the Grand Army. He commanded the brigade at Kulm on 29 August, but during the Second Battle of Kulm he was captured in the village of d'Arbesau on 17 September. He was released in July 1814. On 1 September he was placed on the non-active list, was named a chevalier de Saint-Louis 4 October and officier de la Légion d'honneur 12 October 1814.

In 1815 during Napoleon's Hundred Days Creutzer was commandant of the town and fortress of Bitche. Bitche was besieged by General Zollern's Fourth Infantry Division of the Austrian IV Corps, but Creutzer refused to surrender Bitche, until the general armistice.

He returned to service in 1816 as an inspector of infantry, served as such on the General Staff from 30 December 1818 through 16 June 1819 and was placed on the available (disponible) list on 1 January 1820, where he remained without position until after the July Revolution in 1830. Creutzer's last active employment was as commandant of the department of the Moselle from 6 December 1830 to 31 March 1831. He spent the rest of his career active without employment or in reserve.

== Family ==
Creutzer married the niece of Marshal François Joseph Lefebvre. Creutzer's sister, Jeanne Caroline Christine married the Napoleonic general from an aristocrat background Charles-Étienne Gudin de La Sablonnière (1768–1812).
