= Dmitry Neverovsky =

Russian general (1771–1813)

Dmitry Petrovich Neverovsky
- Дмитрий Неверовский
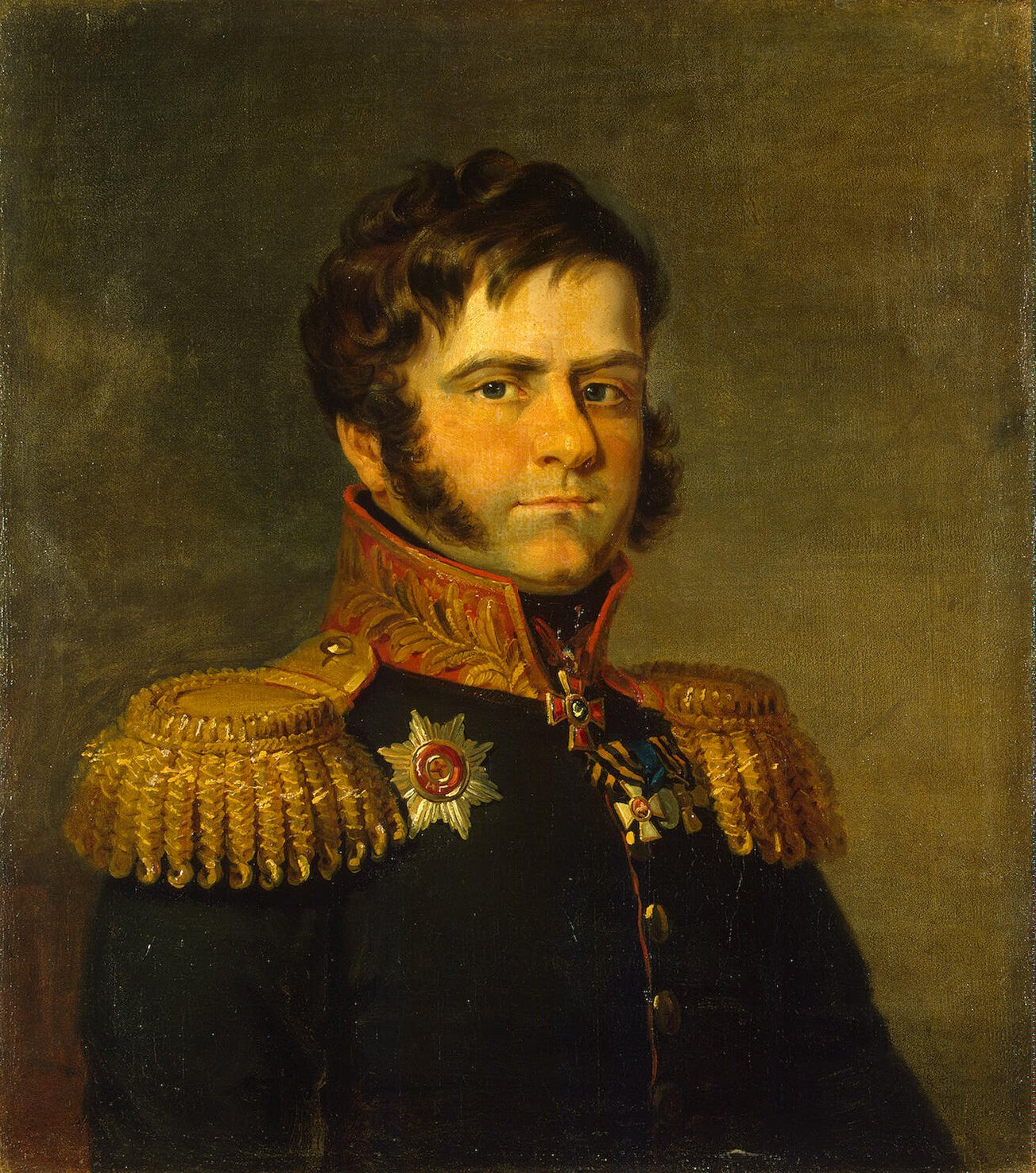
- Portrait by George Dawe, 1820–1825
- Born: 21 October 1771; Prokhorovka, Poltava Governorate, Russian Empire
- Died: 21 October 1813 (aged 42); Halle, Saxony-Anhalt
- Burial place: Borodino
- Military career
- Allegiance: Russia
- Branch: Imperial Russian Army
- Service years: 1786–1813
- Rank: General-lieutenant

Dmitry Petrovich Neverovsky (Russian: Дмитрий Петрович Неверовский; 21 October 1771 – 21 October 1813) was a Russian military officer and general who served in the Russo-Turkish War and the Napoleonic Wars. He served in the battles of Smolensk, Borodino, and Leipzig, where he was mortally wounded. Born to a minor noble in Poltava, in modern-day Ukraine. He would join the army at 15 years of age.

== Life ==
Dmitry Neverovsky was born in Poltava (present-day Ukraine). His father was a middle-ranking official at the time, and Neverovsky grew up alongside fourteen other children. Like many inhabitants of Ukraine at the time, Neverovsky was a fine horseman. Young Neverovsky found a patron in Count Pyotr Zavadovsky, a friend of his father's. Zavadovsky assisted in Neverovsky's education, enabling him to learn Russian and Latin and become a mathematician.

== Military career ==
His career would start out in the Semyonovsky Life Guards Regiment in 1786 at 15 years of age. Something of a year later, he would be promoted to the rank of sergeant.

=== Russo-Turkish War of 1787-1792 ===
He would fight during the Russo-Turkish war, beginning after his transfer to the Malorossiya or 'Little Russian' Grenadier Regiment, where he was promoted in October 1787. During his time in the regiment, he would fight at the battle of Salchea and Bender.

=== Polish-Russian war of 1794 ===
Under the command of Alexander Suvorov, Neverovsky would participate in the Kościuszko Uprising. He would engage in 4 known battles, Derevitse, Gorodische, Maciejowice and Praga. The most prestigious of which was Gorodische, where he would be promoted to a captain.

=== Napoleonic Wars ===
In October 1803, Neverovsky was appointed to the 1st marine battalion as their commander as a colonel. The following year, 1804, he was promoted to a major-general and appointed commander of the 3rd marine regiment, due to the 12 battalions being formed into 4 regiments. Then, Neverovsky served in the Russian army sent to Hannover under Peter Tolstoy (1805) when Russia joined the 3rd coalitionary war and was eventually recalled to Russia. Thus, the humiliating defeat endured at the battle of Austerlitz did not harm his reputation.

In November 1807, Dmitry Neverovsky was appointed as commander of the Pavlovsky Life Guards Regiment, then known as the Pavlovsky Grenadier Regiment. He came to be well-respected due to his character. His honesty, courageousness, generosity and directness earned the trust of his men, and he stood at nearly 2 metres tall, hulking over the rest of the men of the regiment. Dmitry Neverovsky was well known for his focus on the health of his soldiers and their food, and genuinely cared about the soldiers under him. After discovering the high desertion rates of two companies of the regiment, he ousted the officers, believing them to be cruel, as he was subscribed to the idea that Russian soldiers could only desert if the officers were crude, unjust and altogether too harsh. During his time in the regiment, he opened a regimental school to teach the NCOs to read and write. Part of his contributions to the regiment were improving its accuracy, as he would often host firing drills, partake in them, and would personally see to it that the men maintained their muskets well.

While fighting during the French invasion of Russia, after marching to the Western border 10 days after the wars' start, he was assigned to Bagration's 2nd Western Army and was commander of the 27th Infantry Division, which he had helped organise in the last months of the year prior. Seeing that a French assault upon Smolensk would be disastrous without reinforcements, he ordered Neverovsky to stand his ground near Krasnoi, causing the First Battle of Krasnoi. Dmitry Neverovsky was able to successfully delay Marshal Ney, and the battle of Smolensk would start 2 days later. During the course of the Battle of Borodino, his 27th infantry division fought fiercely within the defensive works of "Bagration's Fleches", suffering a casualty rate of a little under 60% of the division's total numbers. Despite being injured, he remained with his men on the field. For his contributions, he was promoted to the rank of Lieutenant-General.

He would then go on to fight at the battle of Leipzig, where he obtained the wound that would end him.

== Death ==
Serving under General Fabian Osten-Sacken's Corps, Neverovsky fought at the battle of Leipzig. During the course of which, a musket ball would shatter his leg, and gangrene would begin to set in. 14 days after the battle of Leipzig, Dmitry Neverovsky would die at Halle, on the 2nd of November. Originally, he was buried at Halle, but his body was moved to Borodino in 1912.

== Monuments ==
General Dmitry Neverovsky's grave is located in Borodino's fields.

== Sources ==
- "Неверовский, Дмитрий Петрович" . Brockhaus and Efron Encyclopedic Dictionary (in Russian). 1906.
