= Charles-Étienne Gudin de La Sablonnière =

French general (1768–1812)

Charles-Étienne Gudin
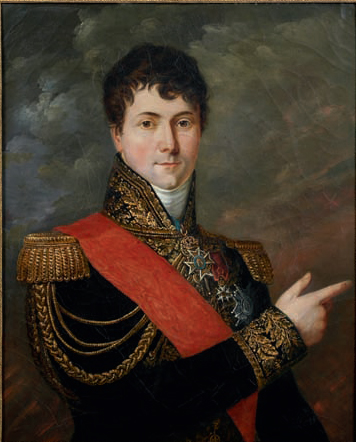
- Portrait by Georges Rouget, 1839
- Born: 13 February 1768; Montargis, Kingdom of France
- Died: 22 August 1812 (aged 44); Smolensk, Russian Empire
- Military career
- Allegiance: France
- Branch: Army
- Service years: 1782–1812
- Rank: General of division
- Conflicts: French Revolutionary Wars; Napoleonic Wars
- Awards: Count of the Empire; Grand Eagle of the Legion of Honour
- Other work: Governor of the Palace of Fontainebleau

Charles-Étienne César Gudin de la Sablonnière (French pronunciation: [ʃaʁl etjɛn sezaʁ ɡydɛ̃ də la sablɔnjɛʁ]; 13 February 1768 – 22 August 1812) was a French general who served during the French Revolutionary Wars and the Napoleonic Wars. A schoolmate of Napoleon Bonaparte at the military school of Brienne-le-Château, Gudin made a career in the army of the ancien régime and the French Revolution. He was promoted to general of division in 1800 and obtained command of a division under Marshal Davout under the First French Empire. Gudin was widely regarded as one of the most capable officers in the Grande Armée and distinguished himself at the battles of Auerstaedt, Eylau, Eckmühl and Wagram, where he demonstrated his talents as a tactician. He was mortally wounded at the Battle of Valutino during the Russian campaign on 19 August 1812.

== Early life and career ==
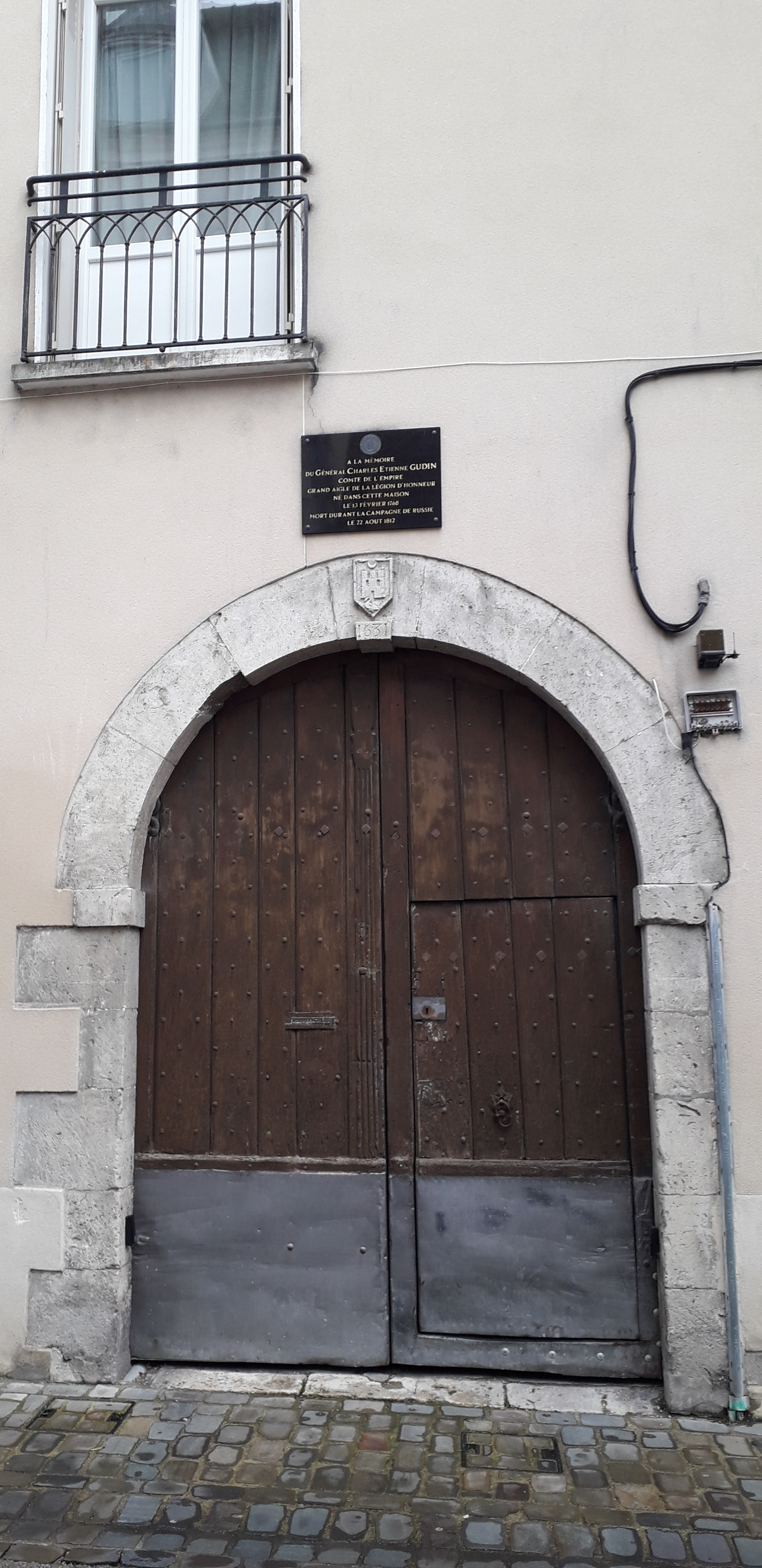
Gudin's birthplace in Montargis

Gudin was born into a noble family in Montargis on 13 February 1768. He was the son of Gabriel Louis Gudin (1732–1819), an officer of the Artois Regiment, and Marie Anne Humery de la Boissière (1736–1827). Gudin studied at the École de Brienne at the same time as Napoleon Bonaparte, then joined the corps of gendarmes of the Maison militaire du roi on 28 October 1782. Two years later, on 2 July 1784, he entered his father's regiment as a substitute sub-lieutenant. Gudin was promoted to full sub-lieutenant in June 1786 and to lieutenant on 1 January 1791. On 28 January he embarked for Saint-Domingue, where he took part in the suppression of the 1791 slave rebellion. He was stationed in Saint-Domingue until January 1793.

== Revolutionary Wars and Consulate ==
Gudin was then sent to the Army of the Rhine, which soon after became the Army of the Rhine and Moselle. Appointed chef de bataillon in 1793 then adjutant general in 1794, he distinguished himself under General Moreau in the Rhine campaigns of 1795 and 1796, and was appointed chief of staff of an active division then brigade general on 5 February 1799. Gudin attacked and captured the Grimsel Pass on 9 July, and then crossed the Furka to join General Lecourbe in the combat of Oberalp on 14 August. Driven from Airolo and the St. Gotthard Pass by Marshal Suvorov's Russians on 23–24 September, he recaptured these positions in early October. The following year he took part in the battles of Stein, Stockach, Messkirch, Höchstädt and Neuburg. On 6 February 1800, while chief of staff of the Army of the Rhine, Gudin was promoted to general of division. He took Füssen on 11 July 1800. Back in Paris, he had a meeting with Bonaparte who congratulated him for his conduct. After three years with no commands, Gudin was placed at the head of the 10th military division at Toulouse in August 1803.

== Napoleonic Wars ==
=== From the Bruges camp to Berlin ===
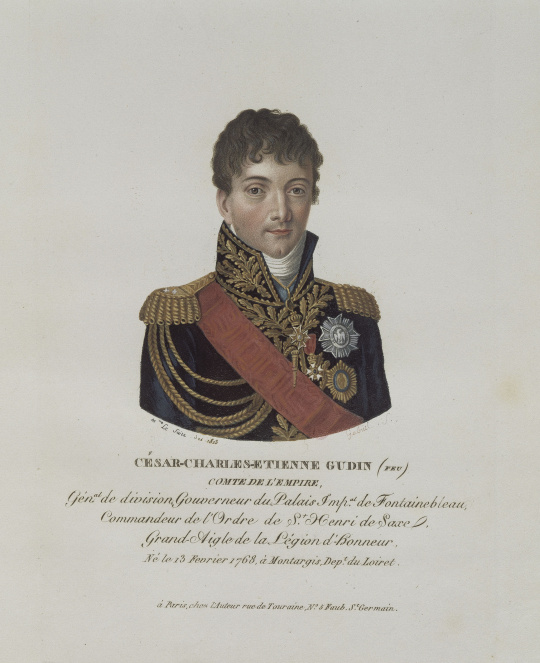
Portrait by Georges-François-Marie Gabriel after Justine Lesuire (1813)

On 23 August 1804, Gudin was chosen to command the 3rd division of Marshal Davout's corps at the Bruges camp, replacing General Durutte. Georges Rivollet notes that "the end of 1804 and 1805 were entirely consacrated by Gudin to the training of the troops and to the maneuvers and shooting exercises that followed one another uninterruptedly". On 30 August 1805, Gudin's 3rd division was officially integrated into the III Corps of the Grande Armée, placed under Davout's command, and participated in the German campaign of the War of the Third Coalition. On the crossing of the Rhine, his division was composed of three brigades comprising eight battalions, for a total of 6,728 men. In November, he was stationed with his troops at Pressburg. Shortly before the Battle of Austerlitz, he left Pressburg to join the main army near Brünn but did not arrive on the battlefield until the day after the battle. Between 1806 and 1812, Gudin shared command of the divisions of the III Corps with generals Friant (1st division) and Morand (2nd division). They were nicknamed "the three of a kind" (le brelan) by Napoleon. This command stability contributed to a large extent to the effectiveness and the prestige of the III Corps within the Grande Armée.

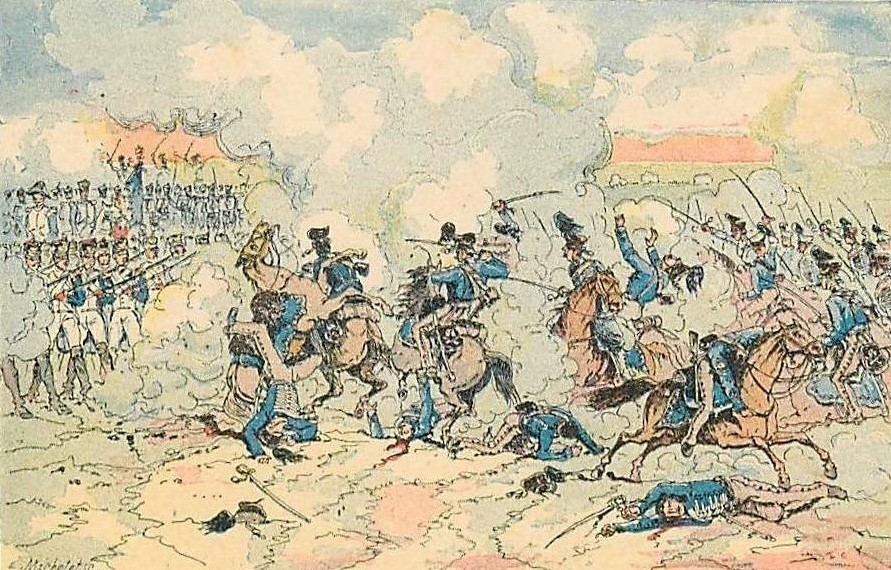
French infantry squares repulsing a Prussian cavalry charge at the Battle of Auerstaedt

Gudin took part in the campaigns of 1806 and 1807 in Prussia and Poland. He had as brigade generals Petit and Gautier, commanding the 1st and 2nd brigades of his division respectively. Within the Grande Armée, he distinguished himself particularly at the Battle of Auerstaedt on 14 October 1806. Marching at the head of Davout's III Corps, he captured the village of Hassenhausen early in the morning and repelled, thanks to his squares, a charge of Blücher's cavalry. He then defended his position against the Prussian troops of General Schmettau. After several hours of resistance, and when his position threatened to be turned, he was rescued by the Morand division, which arrived on the battlefield and then took part in the French counter-offensive against the faltering Prussian army, seizing the village of Eckartsberg. Gudin's division, having been heavily engaged, was the one that recorded the heaviest losses during the battle. It suffered 40 percent casualties, or 134 officers and 3,500 men killed or wounded, one of whom was Gudin, who was seriously injured. For the historian François-Guy Hourtoulle, Gudin's role at Auerstaedt was "crucial".

As a reward, the Emperor ordered the Gudin division to march at the head of the French army entering Berlin. Despite these victories, the war continued and Gudin made his way to Küstrin, which he captured on 1 November 1806, taking 4,000 prisoners. His division then joined the rest of the army in Poland and arrived in Warsaw at the end of the month.

=== Polish campaign and War of the Fifth Coalition ===
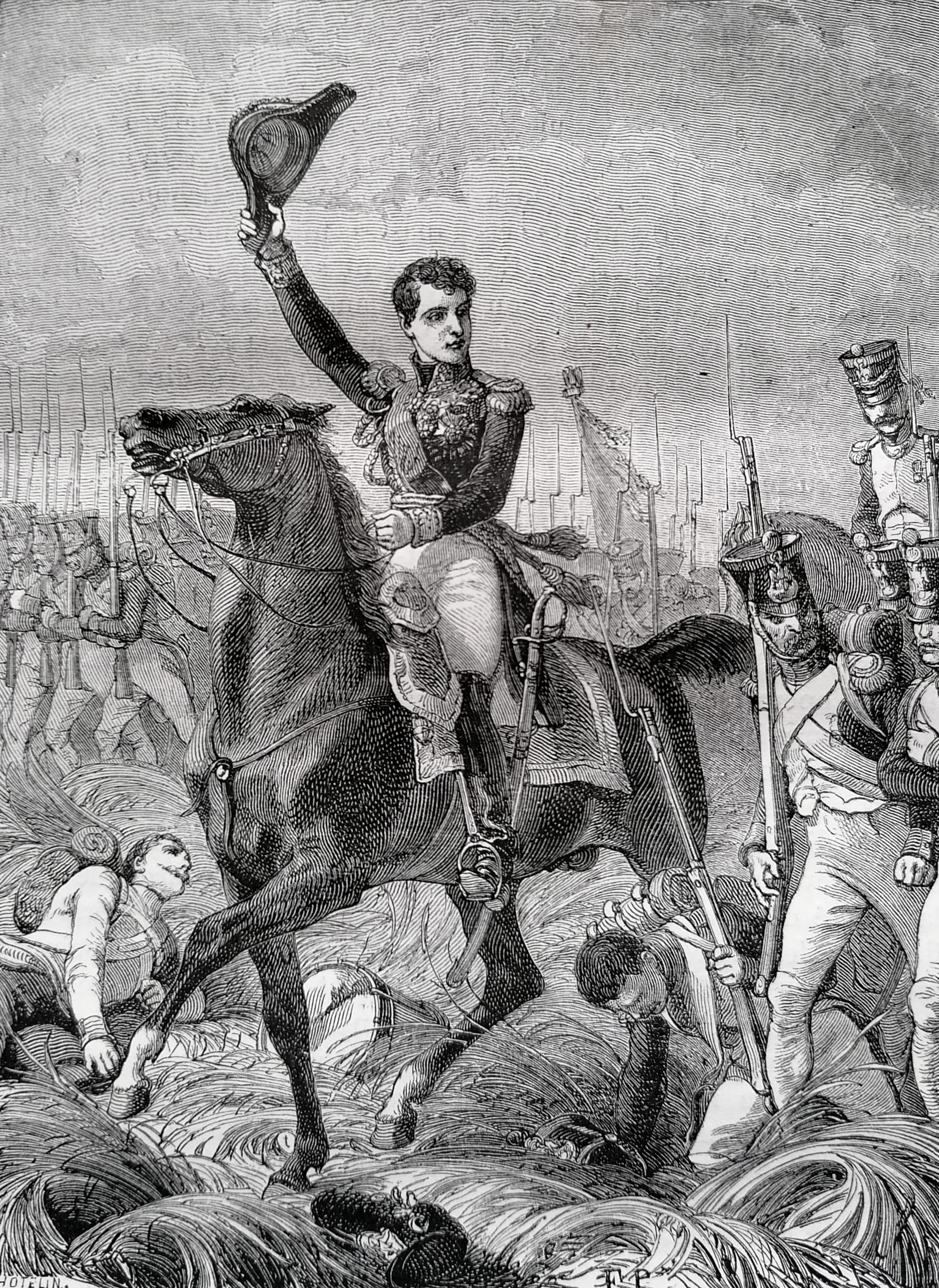
General Gudin on campaign, by Henri Félix Emmanuel Philippoteaux (1873)

A few days later, Napoleon launched his offensive against the Russians. After crossing the Vistula and the Narew, Gudin's division was engaged in the Battle of Pultusk in late December 1806 but the general, who had fallen seriously ill, was not present and was replaced on the occasion by General Daultanne. On 8 February 1807, the Emperor faced the Russian general Bennigsen at the Battle of Eylau, where Davout's corps was tasked with attacking the Russian left flank. The Petit brigade, belonging to the 3rd division, arrived on the field early in the afternoon and immediately went to the assistance of Morand and Friant, who engaged the Russians in fierce fighting. The rest of Gudin's troops arrived on the battlefield shortly afterwards and the general succeeded in capturing the villages of Auklappen, Lampasch and Kuttschitten. The arrival of L'Estocq's Prussian corps, however, forced him to evacuate these last two villages. To support the 12th Line Infantry Regiment, Gudin launched a counterattack with the 51st and 108th Line which, combined with pressure from of Friant's and Morand's troops, forced the Russians to retreat. On 10 February, the Friant and Gudin divisions resumed their advance but a temporary armistice ended hostilities. He was absent from the Battle of Friedland. After the Peace of Tilsit, Gudin was made a Count of the Empire on 7 June 1808 with an endowment of 50,000 francs. He was also appointed governor of the Palace of Fontainebleau in early 1809. At the same time, Gudin requested four months' leave due to illness.

Recalled to the army shortly afterwards, Gudin's division and that of Morand were temporarily placed under the command of Marshal Lannes and participated in the Battle of Abensberg. On 22 April, while Davout faced Archduke Charles at the Battle of Eckmühl, Napoleon, arriving from the south, deployed the Morand and Gudin divisions with the mission of turning the Austrian left wing. After crossing a river, Gudin's 3rd division pushed back an Austrian brigade and occupied the village of Rogging; a battalion of the 12th Line of Gudin's division also contributed to the capture of Eckmühl. Following this victory, the III Corps pursued the retreating Austrians until Ratisbon and, once its fortress had been taken, gathered around Vienna. On 1 June 1809, the Gudin division was composed of 10,588-men divided into three brigades under the command of generals Leclerc des Essarts, Boyer de Rébeval and Duppelin. On 30 June, Gudin's division seized an Austrian bridgehead on the Danube in front of Pressburg, inflicting 1,800 losses on the enemy.

At the Battle of Wagram a week later, with an initial attack on the evening of 5 July against the village of Markgrafneusiedl by Davout's corps having failed, Napoleon ordered a second attempt the following day. That day, however, in the morning, Rosenberg's Austrian corps struck first at the French lines. Expelling the Puthod division from the village of Grosshofen, the Austrians continued their advance on Glinzendorf but were halted by fire from the Gudin and Friant divisions supported by the cavalry. The attackers fell back in disorder on Grosshofen, from where they were finally expelled, forcing Rosenberg to retreat to his starting lines. At 10 a.m., Davout launched his offensive in turn. While Morand and Friant bypassed the position of Markgrafnieusedl, Gudin's division, together with Puthod's, crossed the Russbach stream and attacked the village head-on. Despite fierce Austrian resistance, Gudin, who had personally placed himself at the head of the 85th Line, seized the Nieusedl plateau around noon and joined the rest of the III Corps. The arrival of the Hohenzollern corps, which had come to support Rosenberg against the right of Gudin's division, temporarily put the 85th Line in a difficult position until the Austrian reinforcements were finally defeated. Gudin suffered four gunshot wounds during the Battle of Wagram. A month later, on 14 August 1809, he was made a Grand Eagle of the Legion of Honour.

=== Russian campaign and death ===
The next two years of Gudin's life passed without major events. In January 1810, he was given leave to treat an ear abscess. The same year, Gudin's division was stationed in the Kingdom of Westphalia before being assigned to Magdeburg. For the invasion of Russia in 1812, Gudin's 3rd division, integrated into Marshal Davout's I Corps, was composed of the Leclerc des Essarts (7th Light), Desailly (12th Line) and Gérard (21st and 127th Line) brigades. At the start of the campaign, the Morand, Friant and Gudin divisions were separated from the I Corps and placed under Napoleon's direct orders. Gudin's division was present at the Battle of Vitebsk on 27 July, but its engagement was cut short following the Russian retreat. A few weeks later, on 17 August, the I Corps actively participated in the fighting for the suburbs of Smolensk. The 3rd division took the suburb of Mstislav and there established a battery which, combined with Morand's and Friant's artillery, precipitated the evacuation of the city by the Russian army.

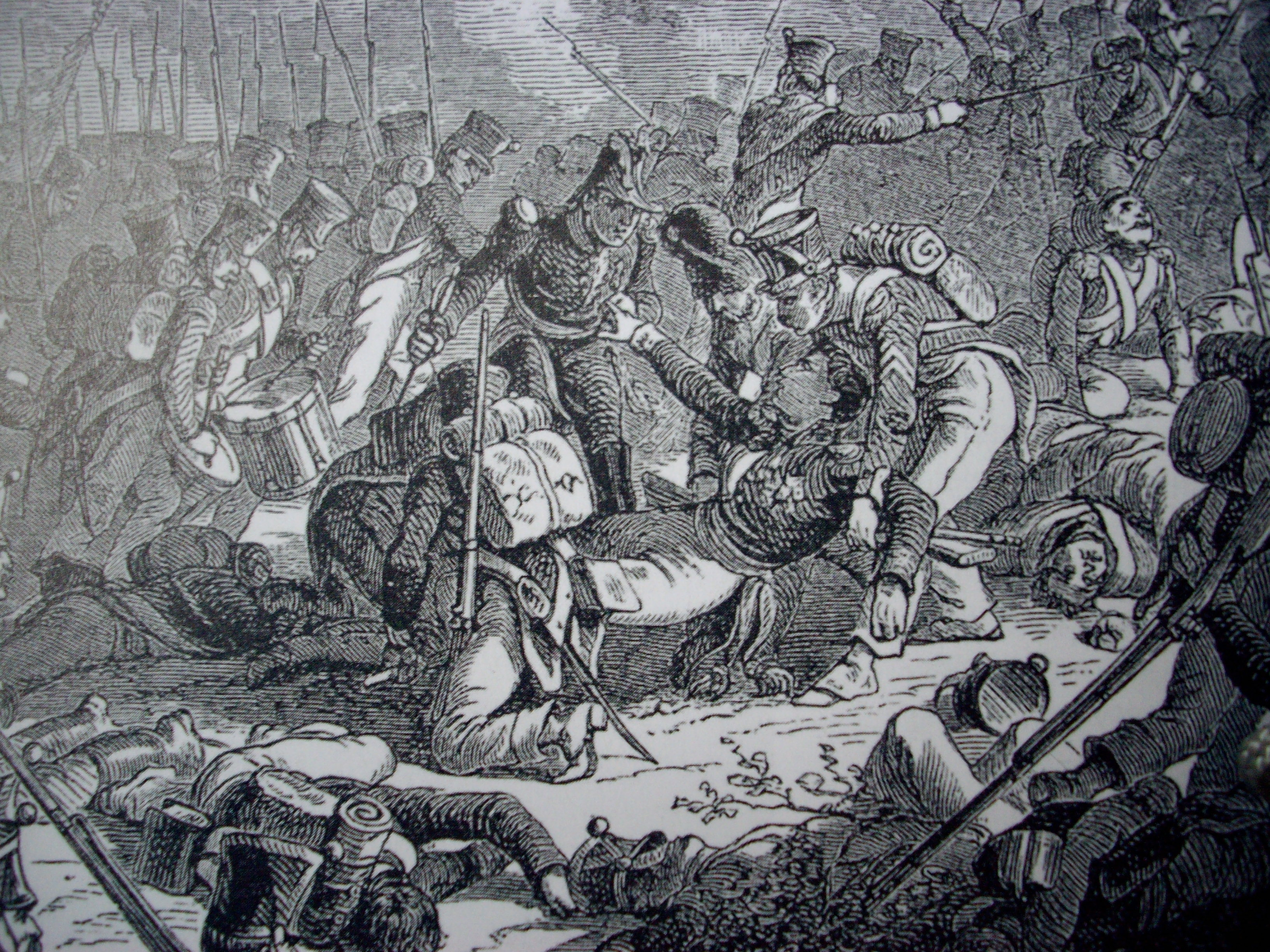
General Gudin, mortally wounded at the Battle of Valutino, hands over his command to General Gérard. Illustration by Philippoteaux.

On 19 August, while Gudin was visiting a religious monument on the right bank of the Dnieper with the Emperor, an aide-de-camp of Marshal Ney informed them that Ney's troops were held in check by the Russian rearguard, which was firmly entrenched on the Valutina Gora plateau. With reinforcements being requested to take the position, Napoleon ordered Gudin to move urgently with his division to the battlefield. Upon his arrival, Gudin met with Ney and advised him to wait until the end of the envelopment manoeuvre, being conducted by Junot, before launching a new attack. Ney disagreed, and a lively dialogue ensued between the two men, which Gudin concluded with the reply: "you will see how my division knows how to take a position that it has been tasked with attacking." At the moment when the 3rd division had just knocked down the centre of the Russian column and was on the verge of capturing the enemy position, Gudin was struck by a cannonball which severed one of his legs and seriously wounded the other. His leg was amputated but he developed gangrene. Gudin died in Smolensk three days later on 22 August 1812, from wounds received at the Battle of Valutino, after having been visited by the Emperor on his deathbed.

Napoleon granted Gudin's widow a pension of 12,000 francs as well as an endowment of 4,000 francs for each of his children with the title of baron. He also dedicated a funeral oration to him in his 14th bulletin, dated 23 August: "General Gudin was one of the most distinguished officers of the army; he was commendable for his moral qualities as much as for his bravery and his intrepidity." Gudin was a friend of Marshal Davout, who wept at the news of his death, and was personally known and esteemed by Napoleon.

== Recovery of remains ==
On 6 July 2019, in a park in central Smolensk, archaeologists led by French historian Pierre Malinowski found a coffin and skeletal remains that bore signs of trauma consistent with the historical record of Gudin's death (one leg amputated and another one wounded). The find was confirmed when DNA tests from the remains found in Russia matched those of Pierre-César Gudin, Gudin's brother, who was also a Napoleonic general.

Gudin's body was subsequently returned to France, and on 13 July 2021 the French Minister of Veterans Affairs, Geneviève Darrieussecq, accompanied by a guard of honour in Napoleonic uniform, officially received his remains. The tense international situation saw the cancellation of a planned larger ceremony. Gudin's remains were buried in the Hôtel des Invalides on 2 December 2021, marking the anniversary of the French victory at the Battle of Austerlitz.

== Legacy ==
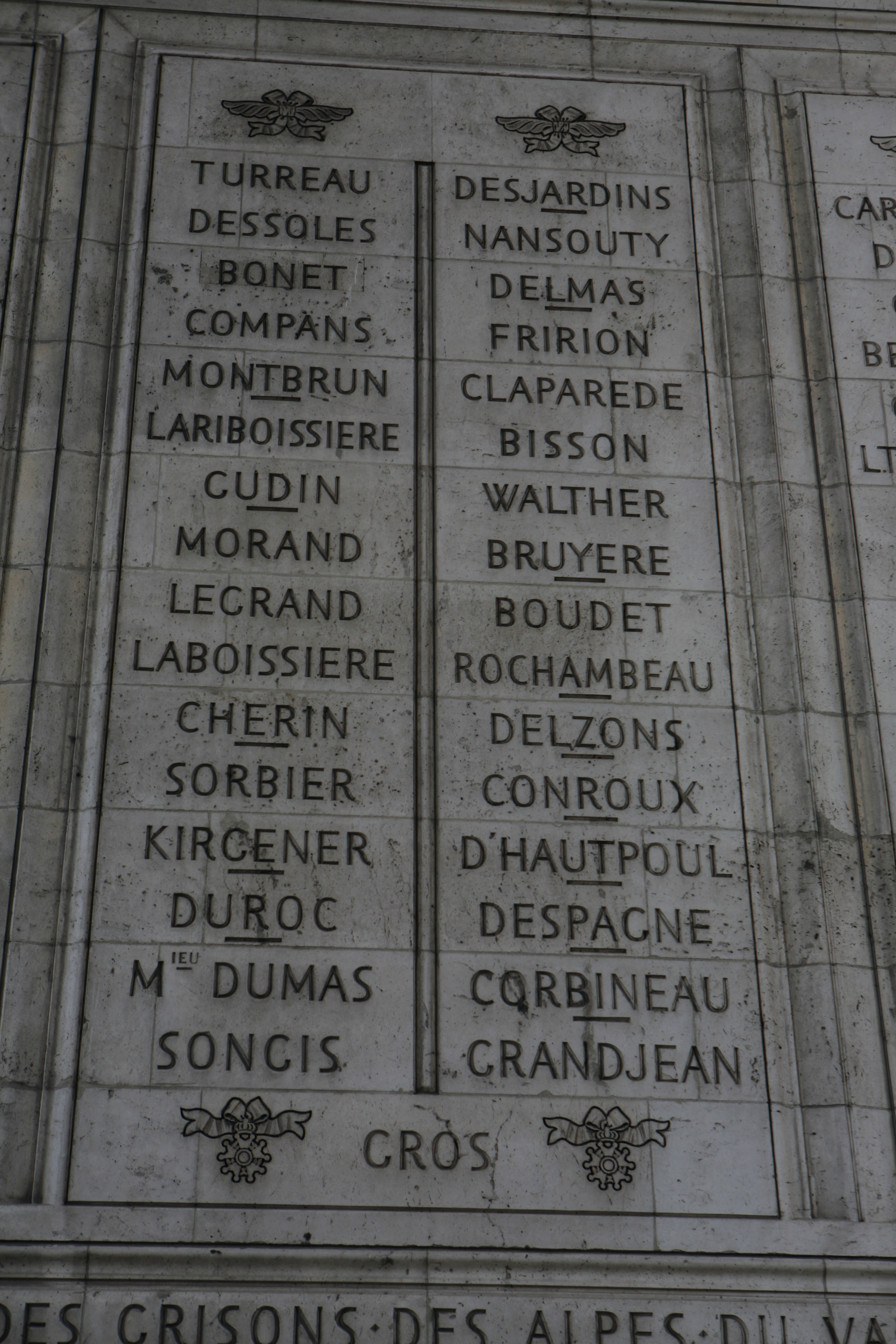
Gudin's name is inscribed on the Arc de Triomphe (7th from the top on the left).

Historians François Houdecek, Frédéric Lemaire and Michel Roucaud write that Gudin's peers considered him "a vigorous general who shines in offensive actions, but who equally perfectly masters defense", citing as examples his campaign in Switzerland in 1799 and his actions at the Battle of Auerstaedt in 1806. Gudin figured among the "six best infantry officers of the army" according to Marshal Georges Mouton. Until 2019, it was only known that his body had been buried in the Smolensk citadel. Gudin's heart was removed to be buried in a chapel in the Père Lachaise Cemetery, Paris. His name is engraved on the Arc de Triomphe in Paris. A bust of Gudin by Louis-Denis Caillouette is exhibited at the Galerie des Batailles in the Château de Versailles. The Rue Gudin, located in the 16th arrondissement of Paris, was named after him.

== Family ==
Gudin was married to Jeanne Caroline Christine Creutzer, the sister of General Charles Auguste Creutzer (1780–1832). They had five children, among them Charles Gabriel César Gudin (1798-1874), a general of the Second Empire. His younger brother Pierre César Gudin des Bardelières (1775-1855) also followed a military career, reaching the rank of brigade general, and was made a Baron of the Empire by Napoleon in 1810. He was a nephew of General Étienne Gudin (1734–1819).
