= Krasninsky =

Krasninsky (masculine), Krasninskaya (feminine), or Krasninskoye (neuter) may refer to:

- Krasninsky District, name of several districts in Russia
- Krasninsky (rural locality) (Krasninskaya, Krasninskoye), name of several rural localities in Russia
