= Krasninsky District =

Location of Lipetsk Oblast in Russia

Location of Smolensk Oblast in Russia

Krasninsky District is the name of several administrative and municipal districts in Russia:

- Krasninsky District, Lipetsk Oblast, an administrative and municipal district of Lipetsk Oblast
- Krasninsky District, Smolensk Oblast, an administrative and municipal district of Smolensk Oblast

== See also ==
- Krasninsky (disambiguation)
- Krasnensky District
