= Tsaryovo Zaymishche =

Tsaryovo Zaymishche Царёво Займище
- Village
- Location within Bryansk Oblast Location within Russia
- Coordinates: 53°04′N 34°42′E
- Country: Russia
- Region: Bryansk Oblast
- District: Karachevsky District
- Time zone: UTC+3:00

Tsaryovo Zaymishche (Russian: Царёво Займище) is a rural locality (a village) in Karachevsky District, Bryansk Oblast, Russia. The population was 12 as of 2010. There is 1 street.

== Geography ==
Tsaryovo Zaymishche is located 20 km southwest of Karachev (the district's administrative centre) by road. Priyutovo is the nearest rural locality.
