= Christian Wilhelm von Faber du Faur =

German painter (1780–1857)

Faber du Faur
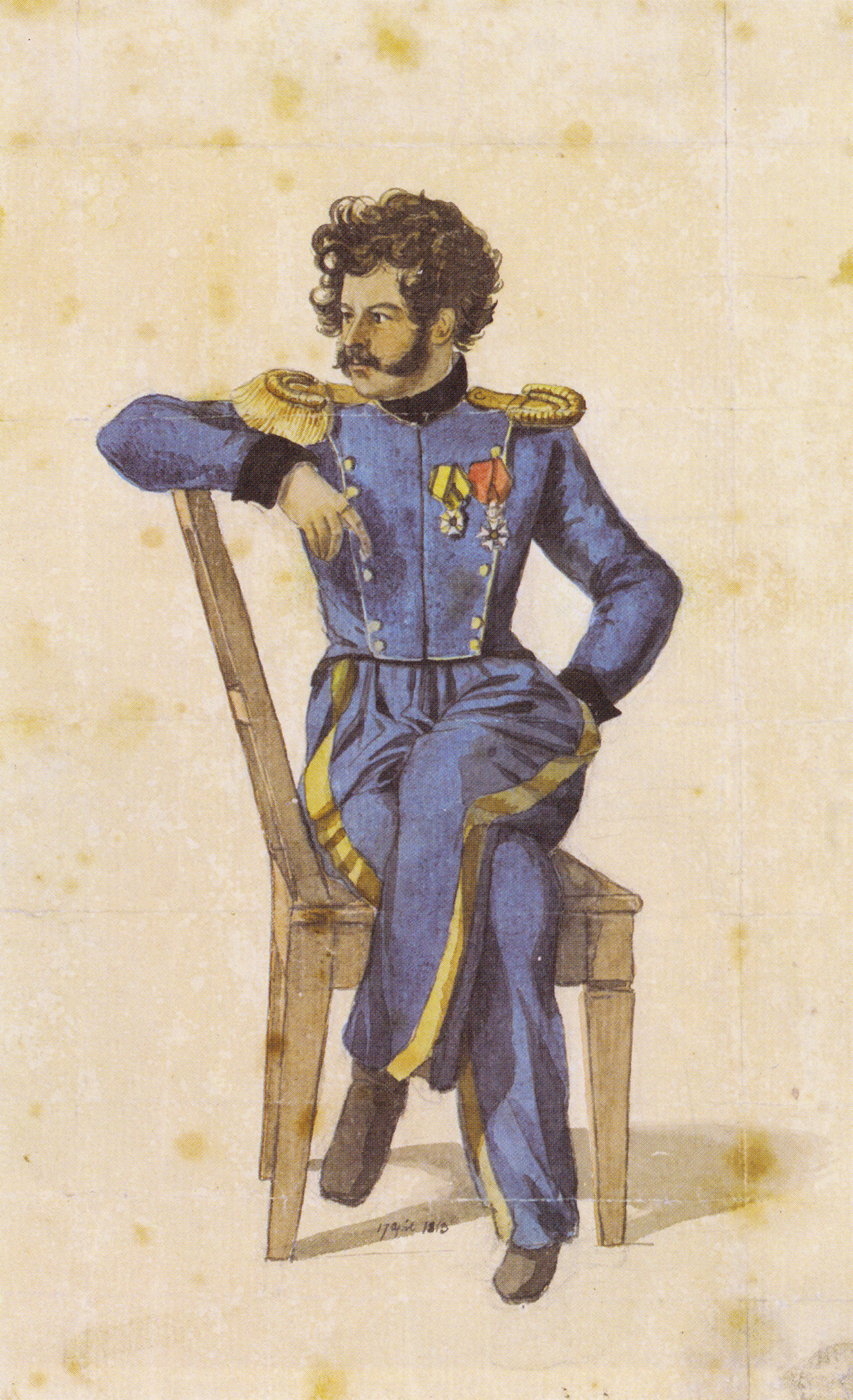
- Born: Christian Wilhelm von Faber du Faur; 18 August 1780; Stuttgart, Duchy of Württemberg (present-day Baden-Württemberg, Germany)
- Died: 6 February 1857 (aged 76); Stuttgart, Kingdom of Württemberg (present-day Baden-Württemberg, Germany)
- Known for: Painting
- Notable work: Blatter aus meinem Portefeuille im Laufe des Feldzugs 1812

Christian Wilhelm von Faber du Faur (18 August 1780 – 6 February 1857) was a painter and an officer in the army of the Kingdom of Württemberg. He was born in Stuttgart. He first devoted himself to painting, but subsequently became a soldier, and as a lieutenant in the 25th Division (the Württemberg unit) of the III Corps of Napoleon's Grande Armée, served in the French invasion of Russia, which he sketched as it progressed. His sketches were exhibited in 1816, and subsequently he used them to produce color plates, and then in 1831–44 published some of them, with text, in a work entitled Blatter aus meinem Portefeuille im Laufe des Feldzugs 1812. His most noteworthy paintings are The Passage of the Beresina, a work of great merit, and The Coffee-House at Wilna. He attained the rank of general in 1849. He died in Stuttgart in 1857.

== Gallery ==
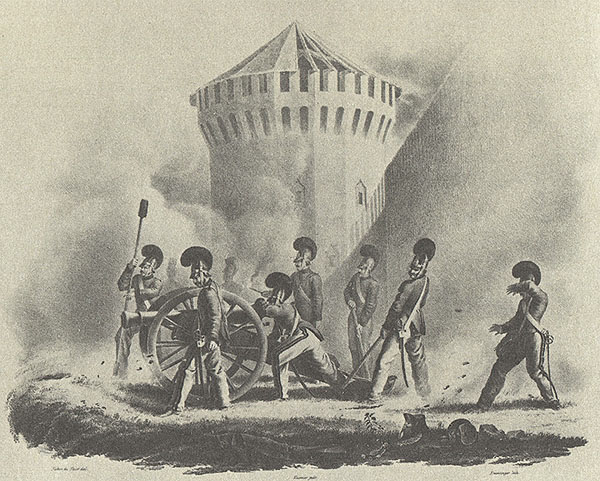
Smolensk, 1812

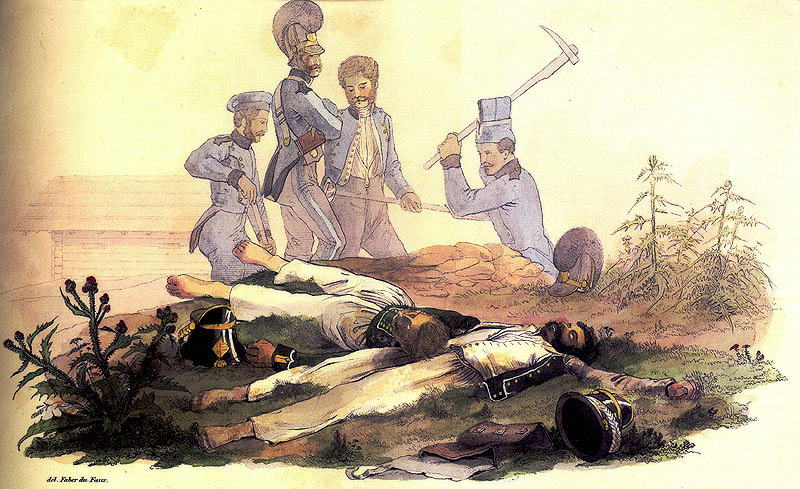
In Beshankovichy

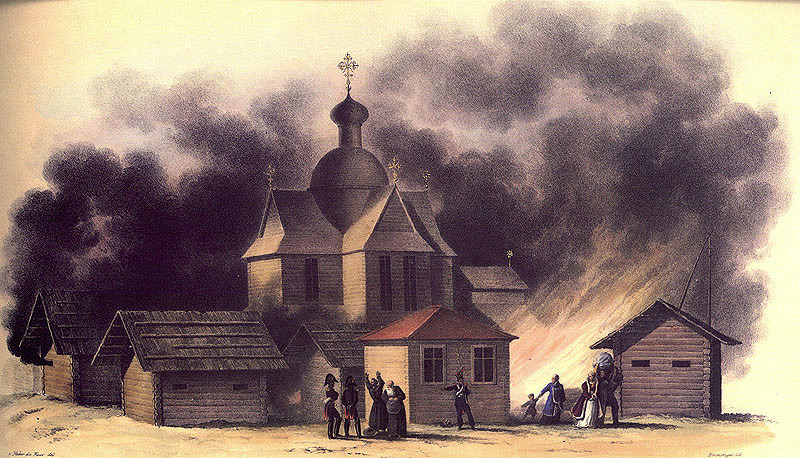
In Beshankovichy

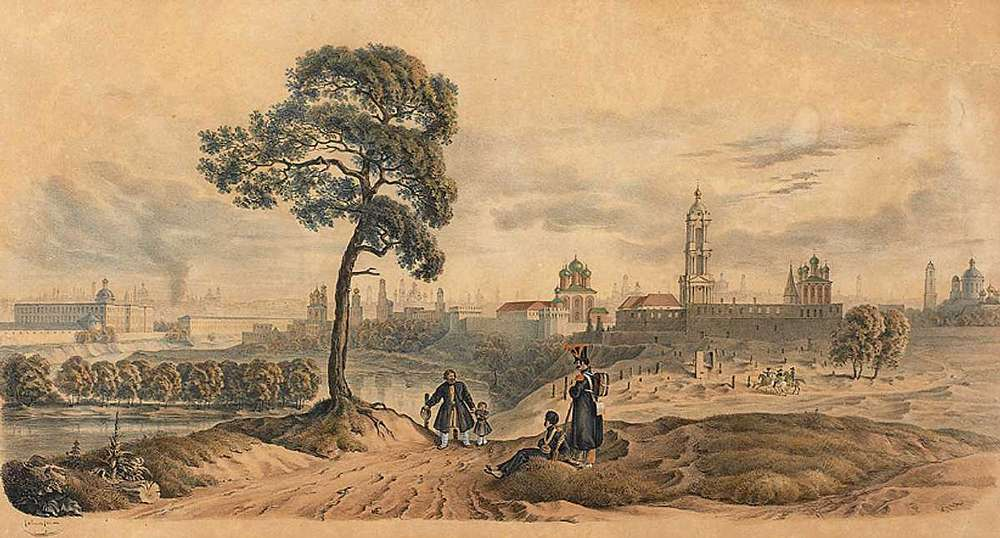
Moscow, 1812

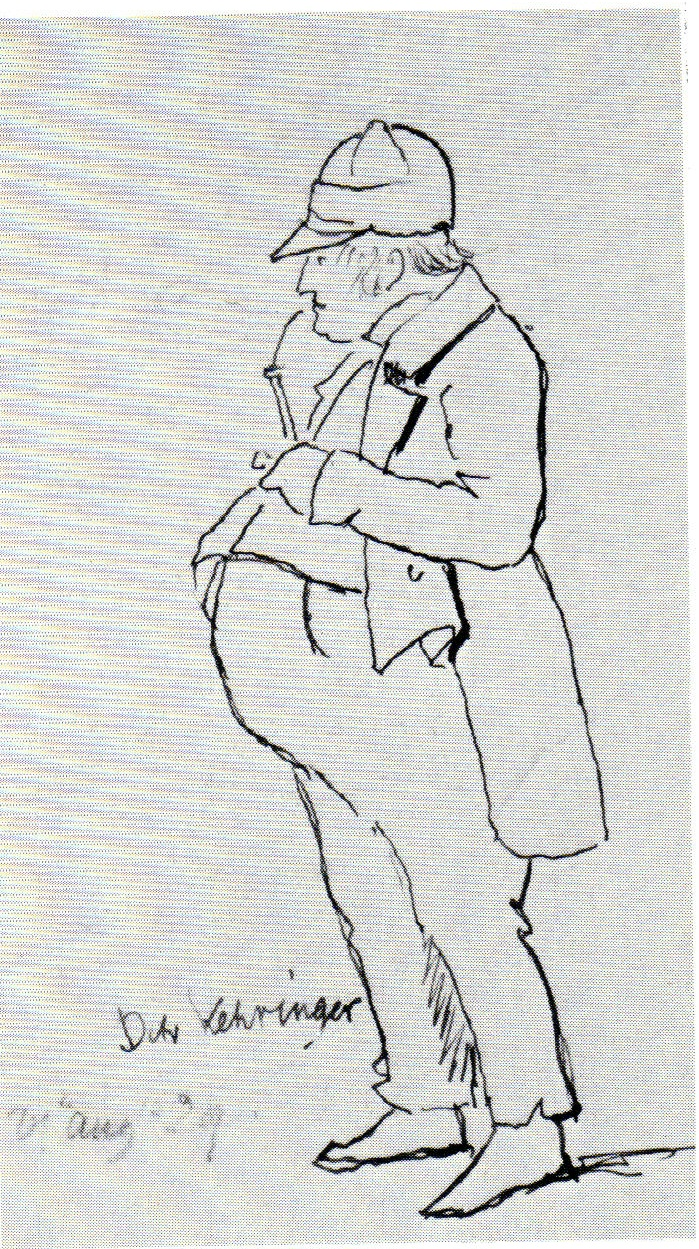
Joseph Kehringer, drawing ca. 1800 now in the Städtisches Museum Schwäbisch Gmünd
