= Ludwig Michael Schwanthaler =

German sculptor (1802–1848)

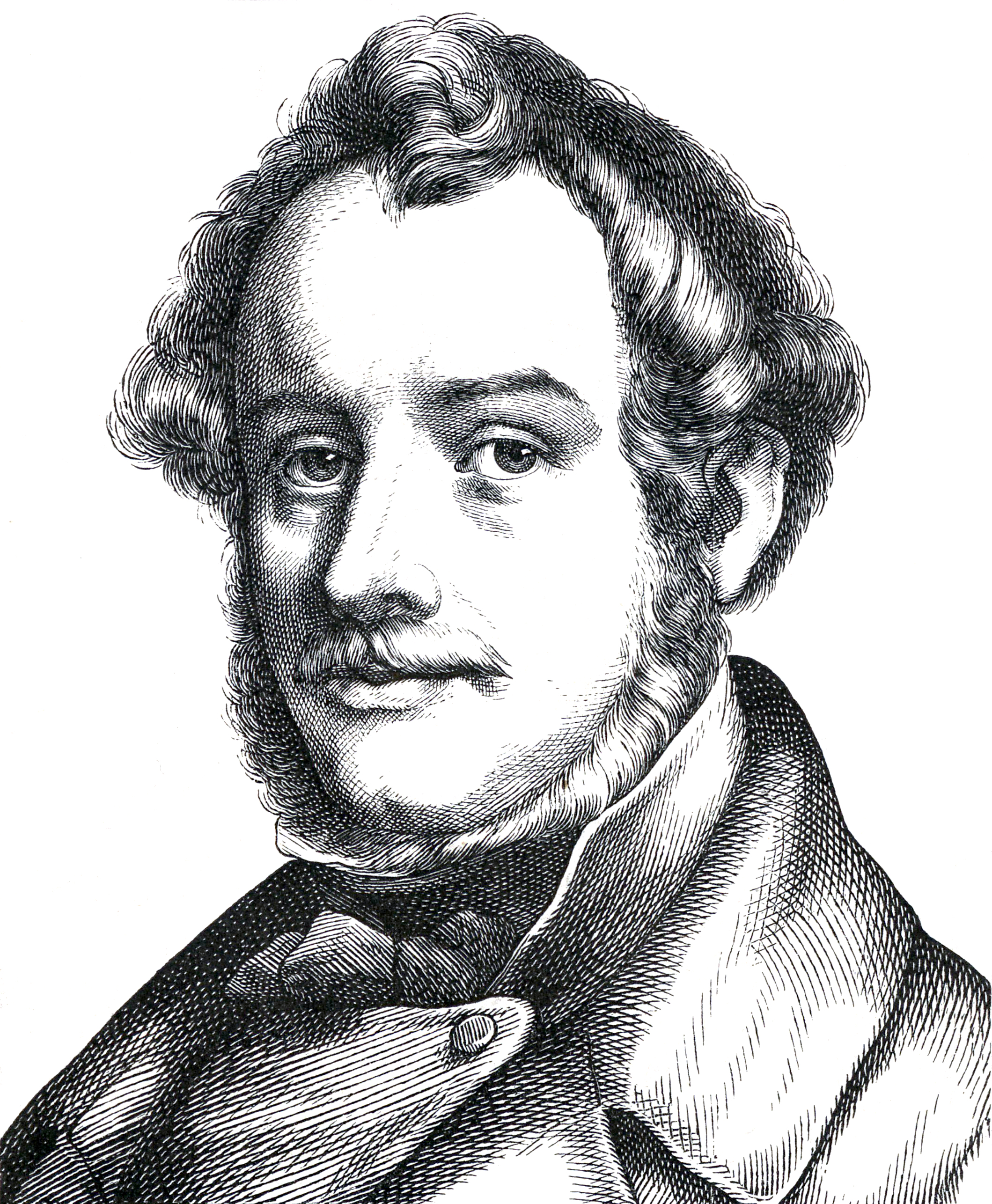
Ludwig Schwanthaler, from Two Hundred German Men in Portraits and Biographies (1854)

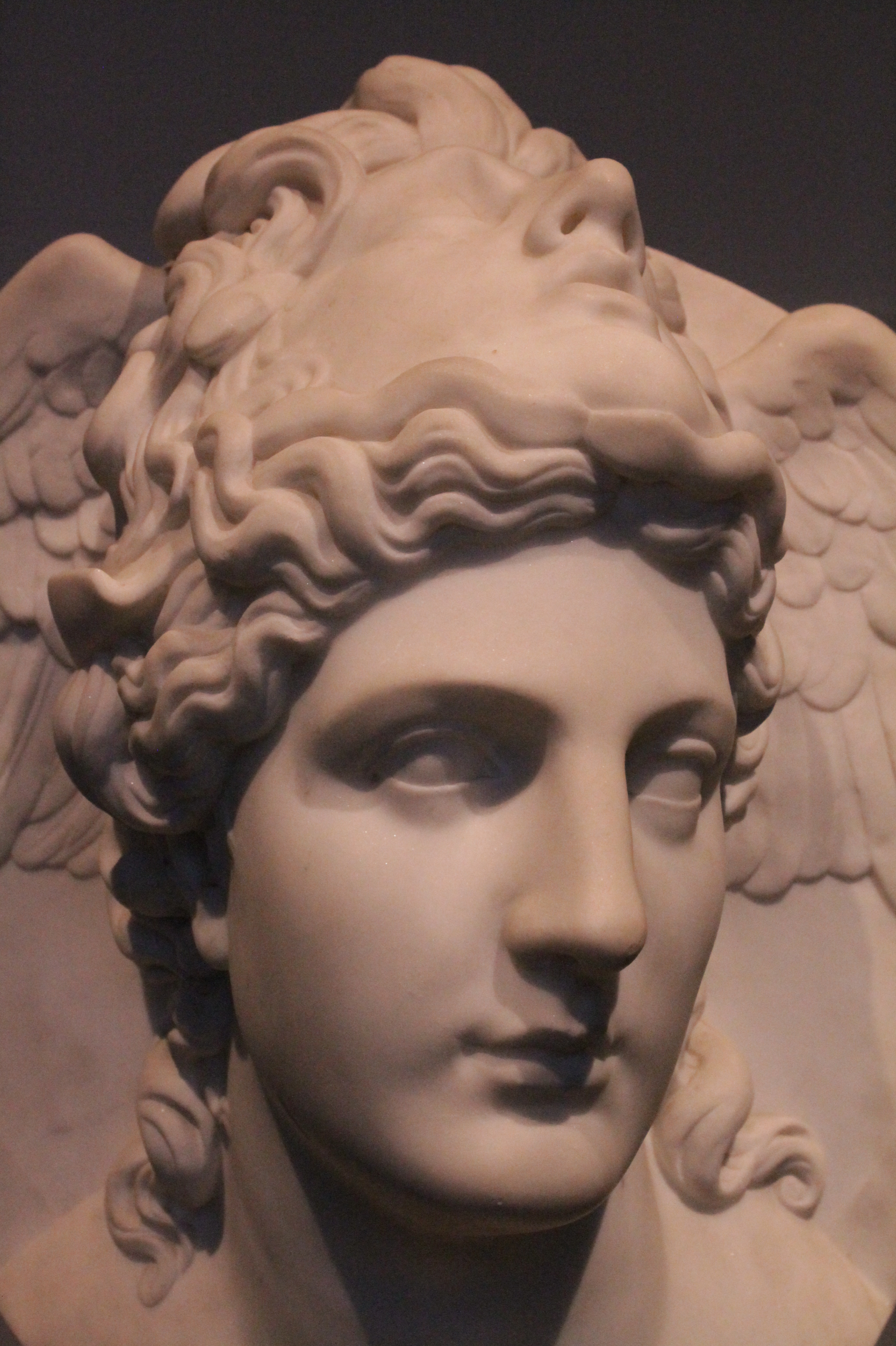
Athena wearing the mask of Medusa, Ludwig von Schwanthaler 1840, Albertinum, Dresden

Ludwig Michael Schwanthaler, later ennobled as Ritter von Schwanthaler (26 August 1802 – 14 November 1848), was a German sculptor who taught at the Academy of Fine Arts, Munich.

== Biography ==
Schwanthaler was born in Munich. His family had been sculptors in Tyrol and Innviertel for three centuries; young Ludwig received his earliest lessons from his father, Franz Schwanthaler (1762–1820), and the father had been instructed by the grandfather. The last to bear the name was Xaver, who worked in his cousin Ludwig's studio and survived until 1854. For successive generations the family lived by the carving of busts and sepulchral monuments, and from the condition of craftsmen rose to that of artists.

From the Munich Gymnasium Schwanthaler passed as a student to the Munich Academy; at first he purposed to be a painter, but afterwards reverted to the sculptural arts of his ancestors. His talents received timely encouragement by a commission for an elaborate silver service for the king's table. Peter von Cornelius also befriended him; the painter was occupied on designs for the decoration in fresco of the newly erected Glyptothek, and at his suggestion Schwanthaler was employed on the sculpture within the halls.

Thus arose between painting, sculpture, and architecture that union and mutual support which characterized the revival of the arts in Bavaria. Schwanthaler in 1826 went as a pensioner of the king to Rome, where he carried out a number of commissions, and on a second visit in 1832 Bertel Thorvaldsen provided assistance. His skill was so developed that on his return he was able to meet the extraordinary demand for sculpture occasioned by King Ludwig's passion for building new palaces, churches, galleries, and museums, and he became the fellow-worker of the architects Leo von Klenze, Friedrich von Gartner and Joseph Daniel Ohlmüller, and of the painters Cornelius, Julius Schnorr von Karolsfeld and Karl Hess.

Owing to the magnitude and multitude of the sculptural commissions they turned out, over-pressure and haste in design and workmanship brought down the quality of the art. The works of Schwanthaler in Munich are so many and miscellaneous that they can only be briefly indicated. The Neues Palais is peopled with his statues: the throne-room has twelve imposing gilt bronze figures 10 feet high; the same palace is also enriched with a frieze and with sundry other decorations modelled and painted from his drawings. The sculptor, like his contemporary painters, received help from trained pupils, one of whom, Anton Dominik Fernkorn, went on to have a very successful career in Vienna. The same prolific artist also furnished Munich's Alte Pinakothek with twenty-five marbles commemorating great painters; likewise he supplied a composition for the pediment of the exhibition building facing the Glyptothek, and executed sundry figures for the public library and the hall of the marshals.

Although sacred art was not a major focus of his career, he produced works for the churches of St. Ludwig and St. Mariahilf, demonstrating his engagement with religious subjects. His most extensive project was the Ruhmeshalle in Munich, for which he created ninety-two metopes and contributed to the monumental figure of Bavaria, standing approximately 60 feet (18 m) high. Despite his relatively short life, he also completed the sculptural groups for the north pediment of the Walhalla at Regensburg and produced numerous portrait statues, including depictions of Mozart, Jean Paul, Goethe, and Shakespeare.

Schwanthaler died in Munich in 1848, and willed to the Munich Academy all his models and studies, which formed the Schwanthaler Museum. He is buried in the Alter Südfriedhof in Munich.

== Selected works ==
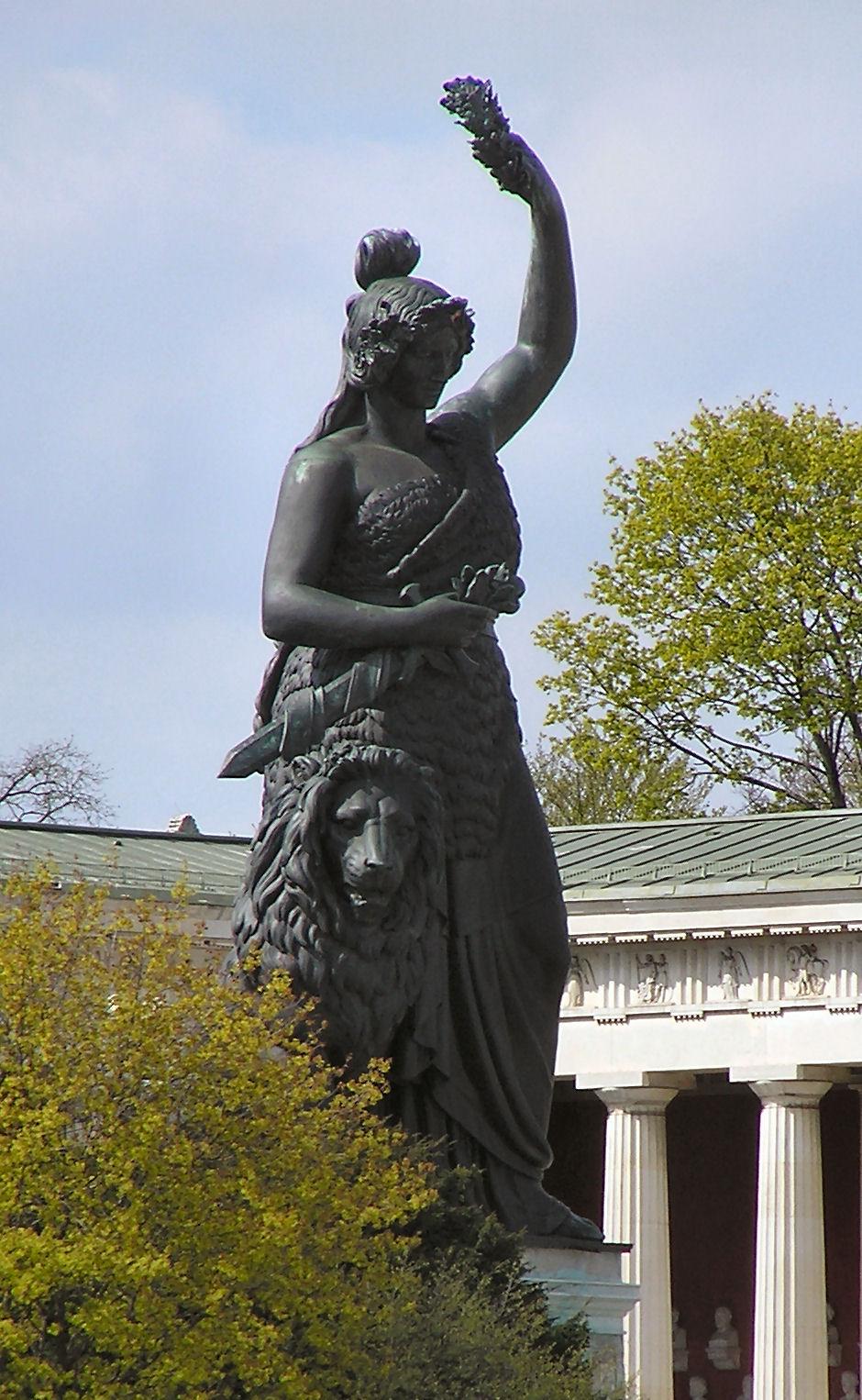
Bavaria statue, at the Ruhmeshalle (Hall of Fame), Munich

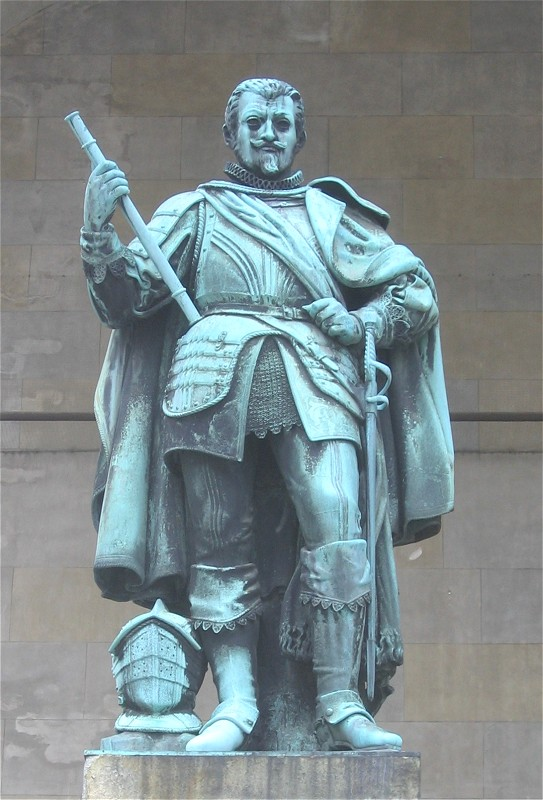
Tilly Monument at the Feldherrnhalle, Munich

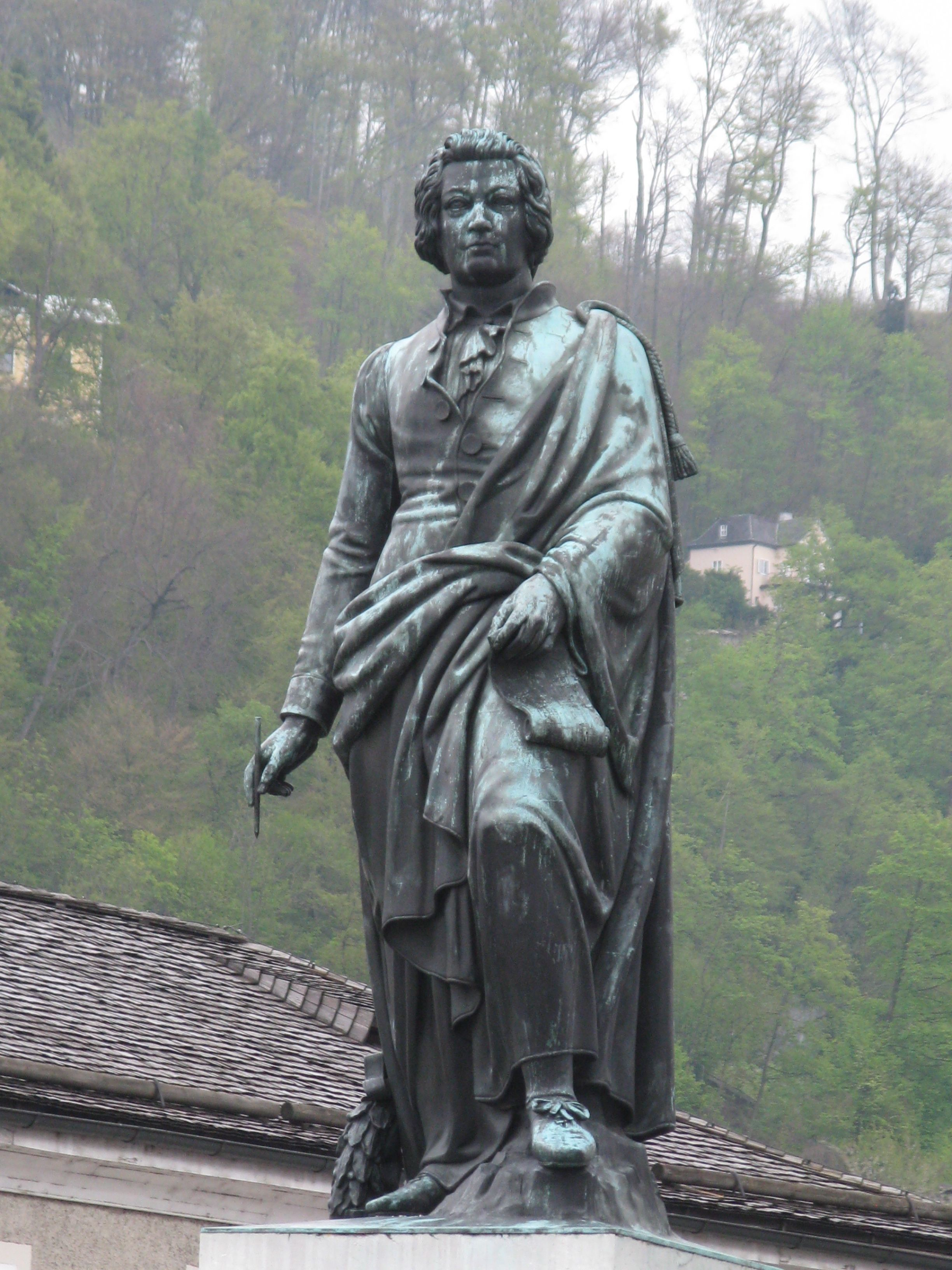
Mozart Monument in Salzburg

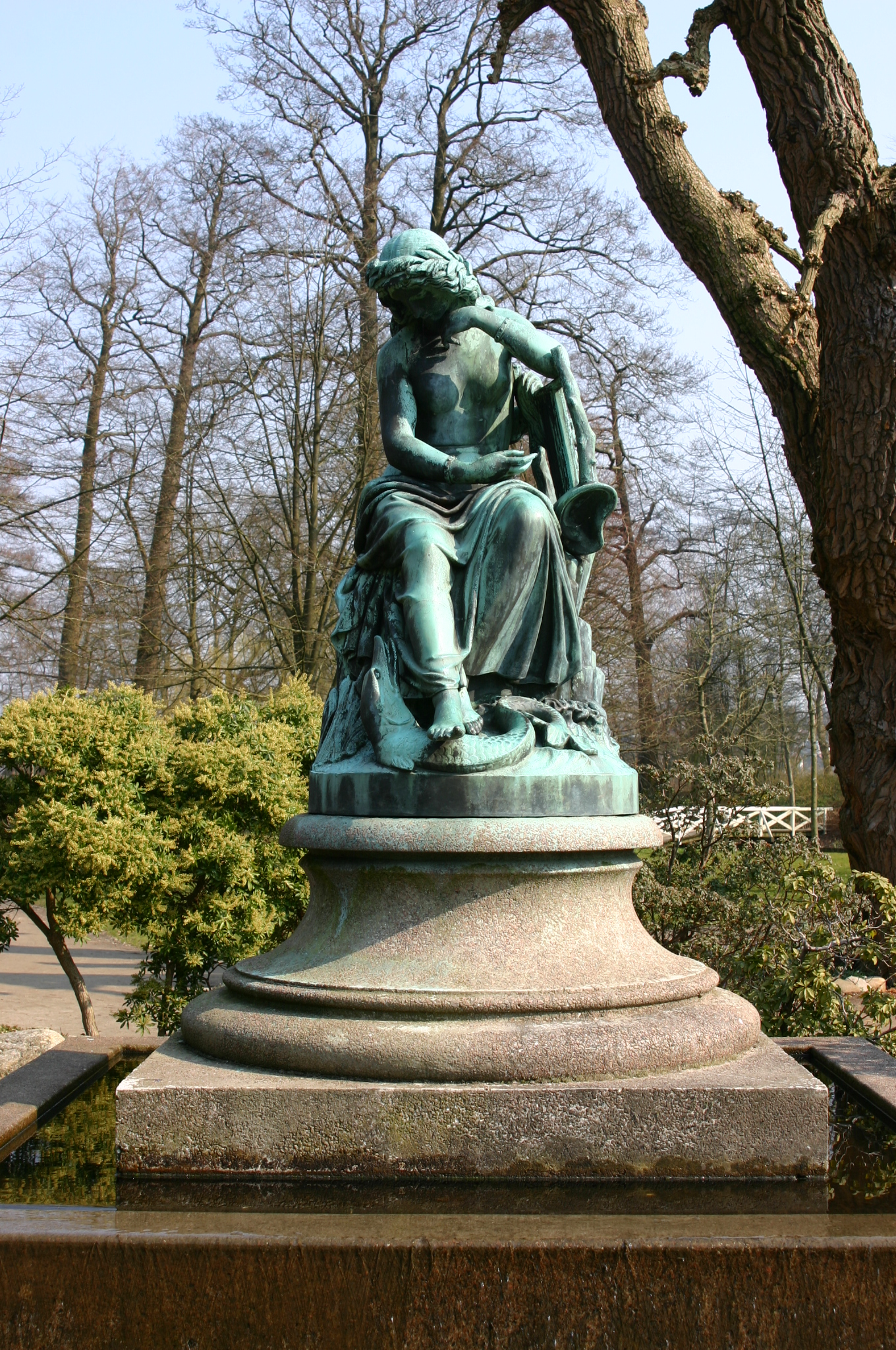
Vandpigen (Water Girl) in Viborg

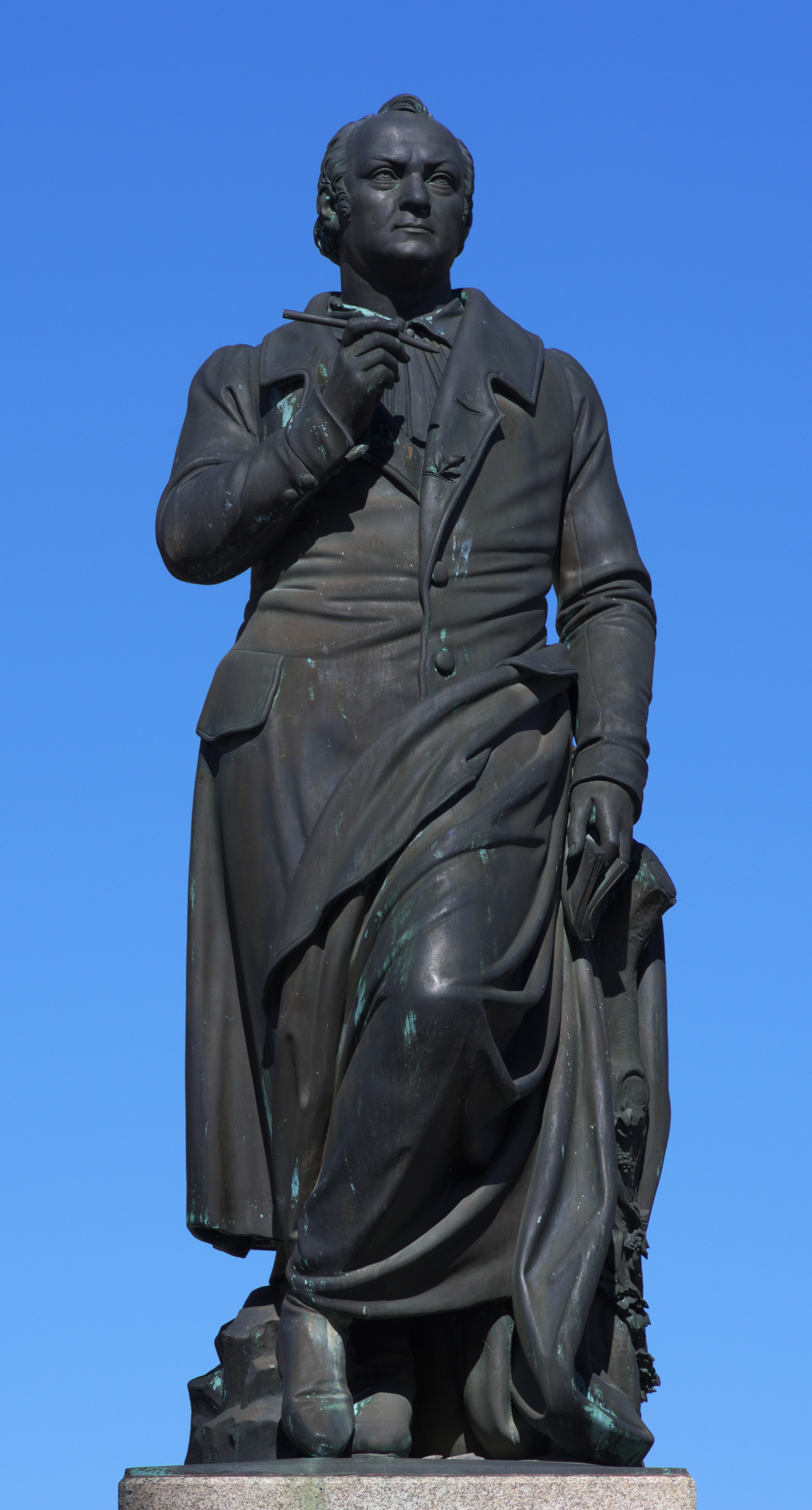
Jean Paul Monument in Bayreuth
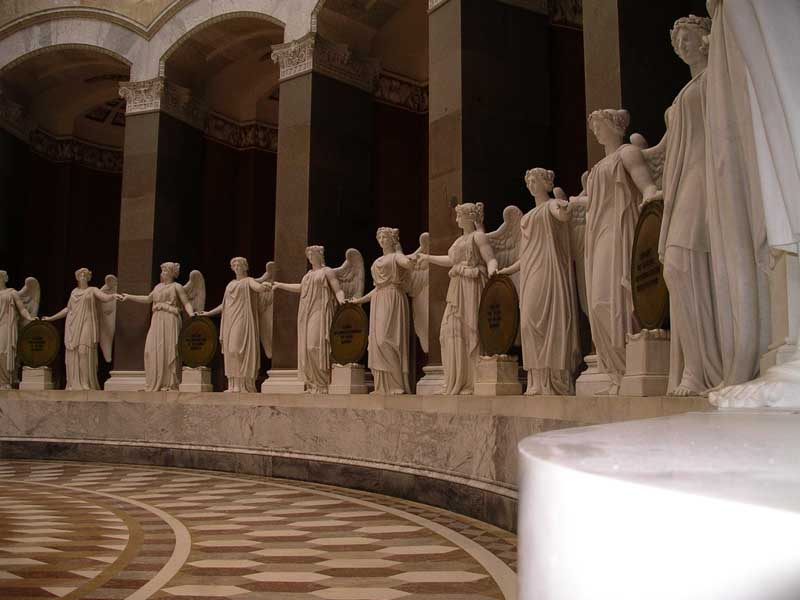
Goddesses of Victory, Befreiungshalle (Hall of Liberation), Munich

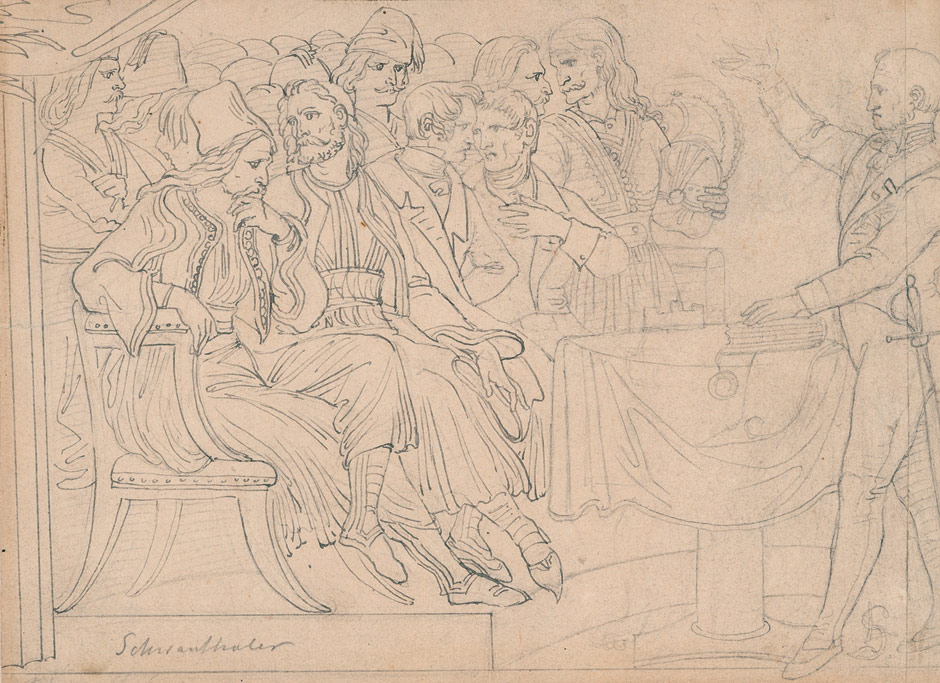
King Otto (?) before Greek ambassadors (pencil drawing, c. 1836-41)
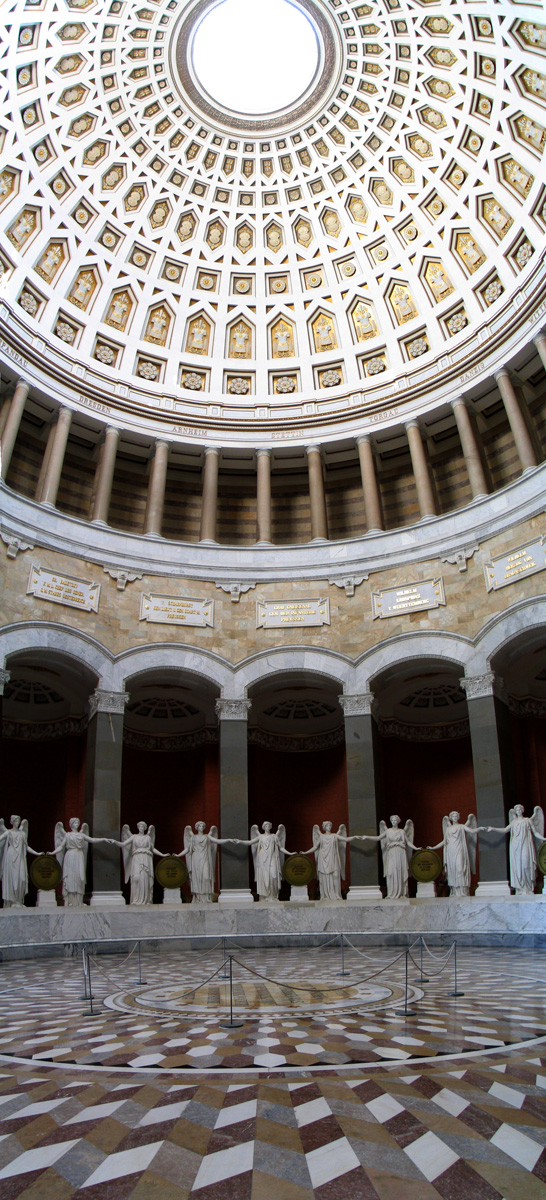
Goddesses of Victory, Befreiungshalle

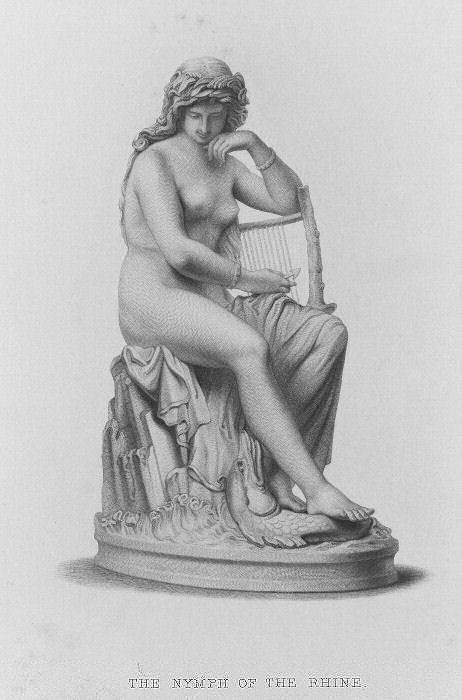
Nymph of the Rhine

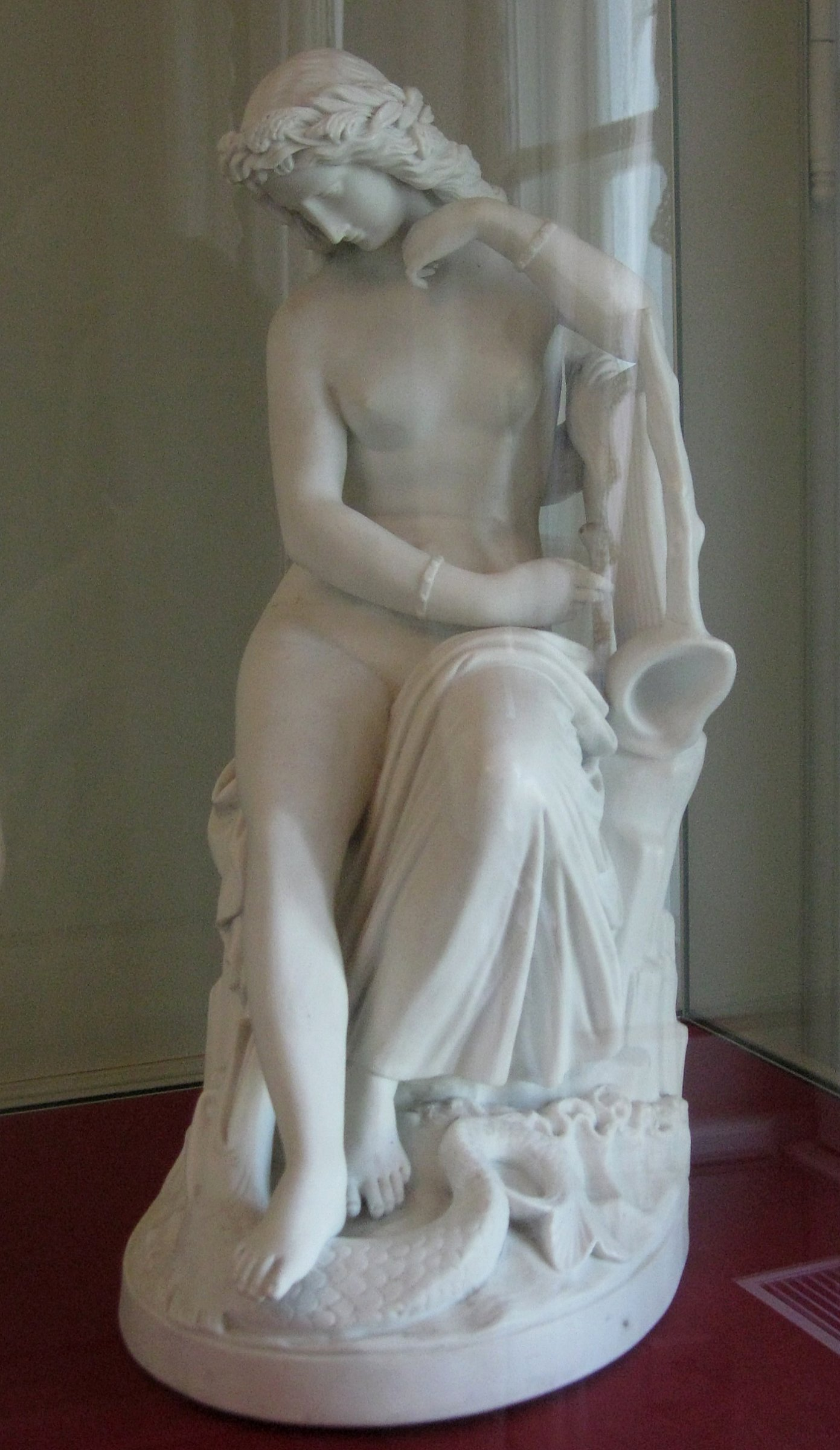
Loreley
Porcelain Museum, Munich

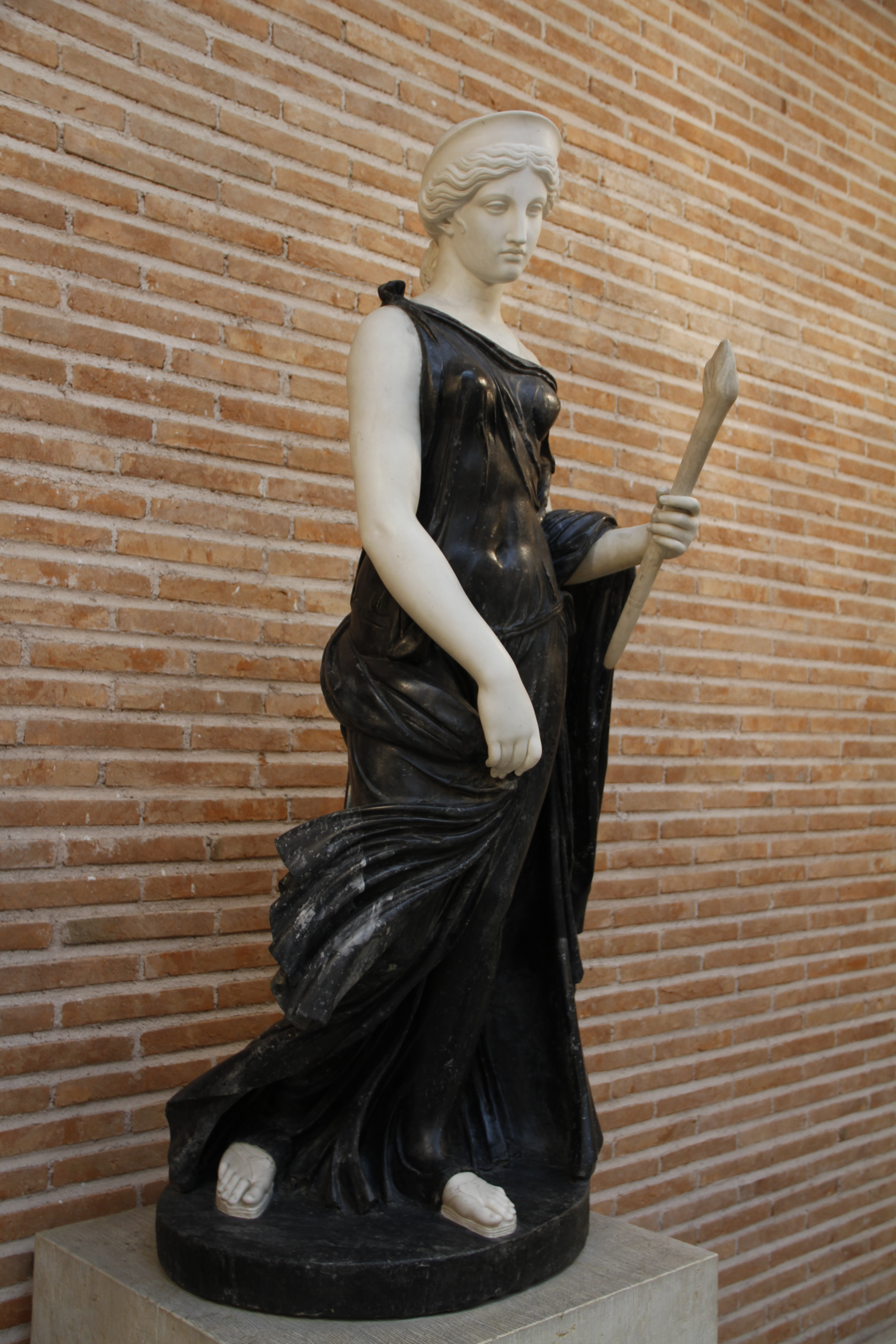
Nyx (incorporating ancient fragments)
Prinz-Carl-Palais, Munich

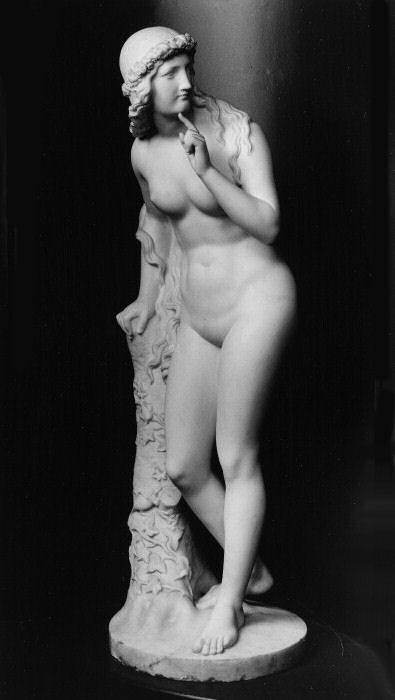
Melusine
Russell-Cotes Art Gallery & Museum, Bournemouth, UK
