= Crossing the Berezina River =

Painting by Peter von Hess

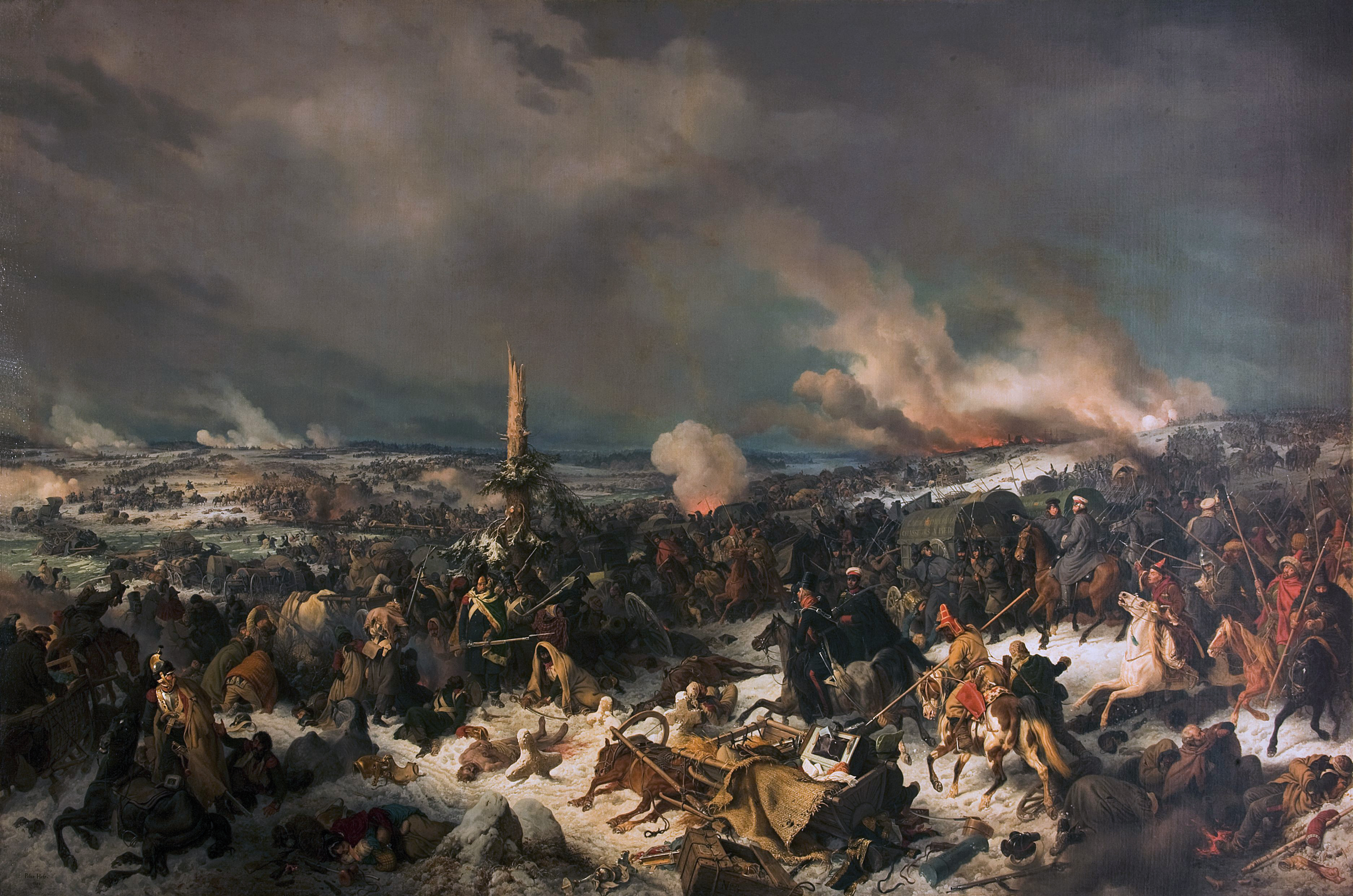
- Artist: Peter von Hess
- Year: 1844
- Type: Oil on canvas, history painting
- Dimensions: 224 cm × 355 cm (88 in × 140 in)
- Location: Hermitage Museum; Saint Petersburg

Crossing the Berezina River is an 1844 history painting by the German artist Peter von Hess. It depicts the Battle of Berezina on 29 November 1812 during the Napoleonic Wars. French forces under Napoleon, retreating from Moscow following their ultimately unsuccessful Invasion of Russia, had to force a passage of the Berezina River. The battle took place in modern-day Belarus, and was a partial French success as Napoleon was able to get the remnants of his Grande Armée across the river on pontoon bridges in the face of fierce Russian opposition and continue the retreat westwards.

The artist had trained in Munich and worked frequently for Ludwig I of Bavaria. In 1839 Nicholas I of Russia invited him to travel to Russia to produce a cycle of paintings depicting key scenes from the 1812 campaign of which this is the last. On the left a group of French soldiers try to make a last stand as they face a charge by Russian forces led by Peter Wittgenstein. The mounted soldiers behind him are a mix of Cossacks, Bashkirs and Kalmyks, celebrating the various ethnicities that played a part on Russia's victory. The painting is today in the collection of the Hermitage Museum in Saint Petersburg. The battle was also notably painted by the Polish artist January Suchodolski in 1866, now in the National Museum in Poznań.

== Bibliography ==
- Lieven, Dominic. Russia Against Napoleon: The Battle for Europe, 1807 to 1814. Penguin UK, 2010.
- Mikaberidze, Alexander. Berezina 1812: Napoleon’s Hollow Victory. Bloomsbury Publishing, 2022.
- Nedd, Andrew M. History and Myth in Pictorial Narratives of the Russian 'Patriotic War', 1812-1914. Springer Nature, 2024.
