= Carl Ernst Christoph Hess =

German copperplate engraver

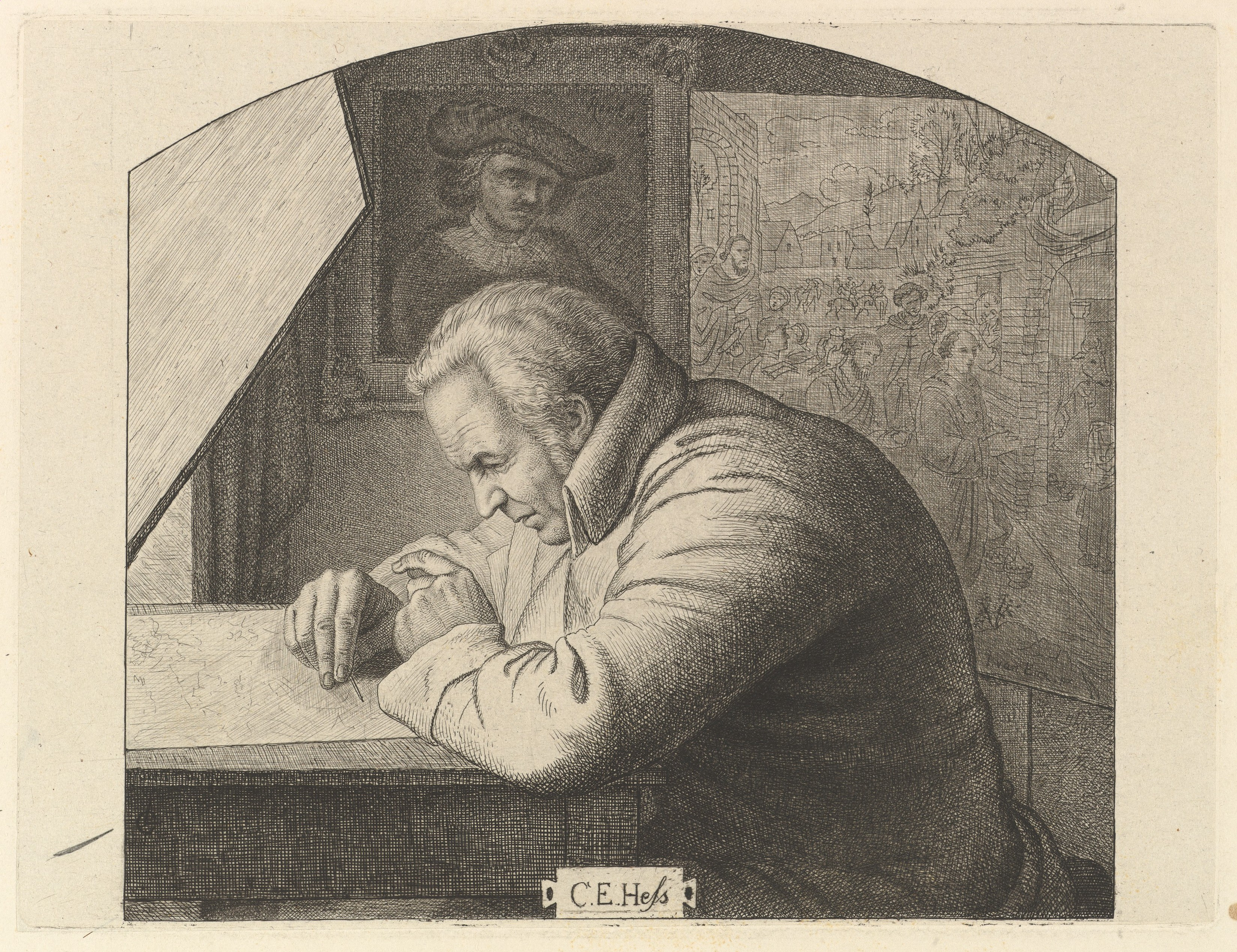
Carl Ernst Christoph Hess. Etching by Ludwig Emil Grimm; one of his students

Carl Ernst Christoph Hess, or Carl Ernst Heß (22 January 1755, Darmstadt - 25 July 1828, Munich) was a German copper engraver and painter.

== Biography ==
His father, Johann Heinrich Hess (1712–1768) was the court instrument maker in Darmstadt. He was only thirteen when his father died, so he was apprenticed to a Schwertfeger (a blacksmith who specializes in swords, daggers and other weapons) in Strasbourg.

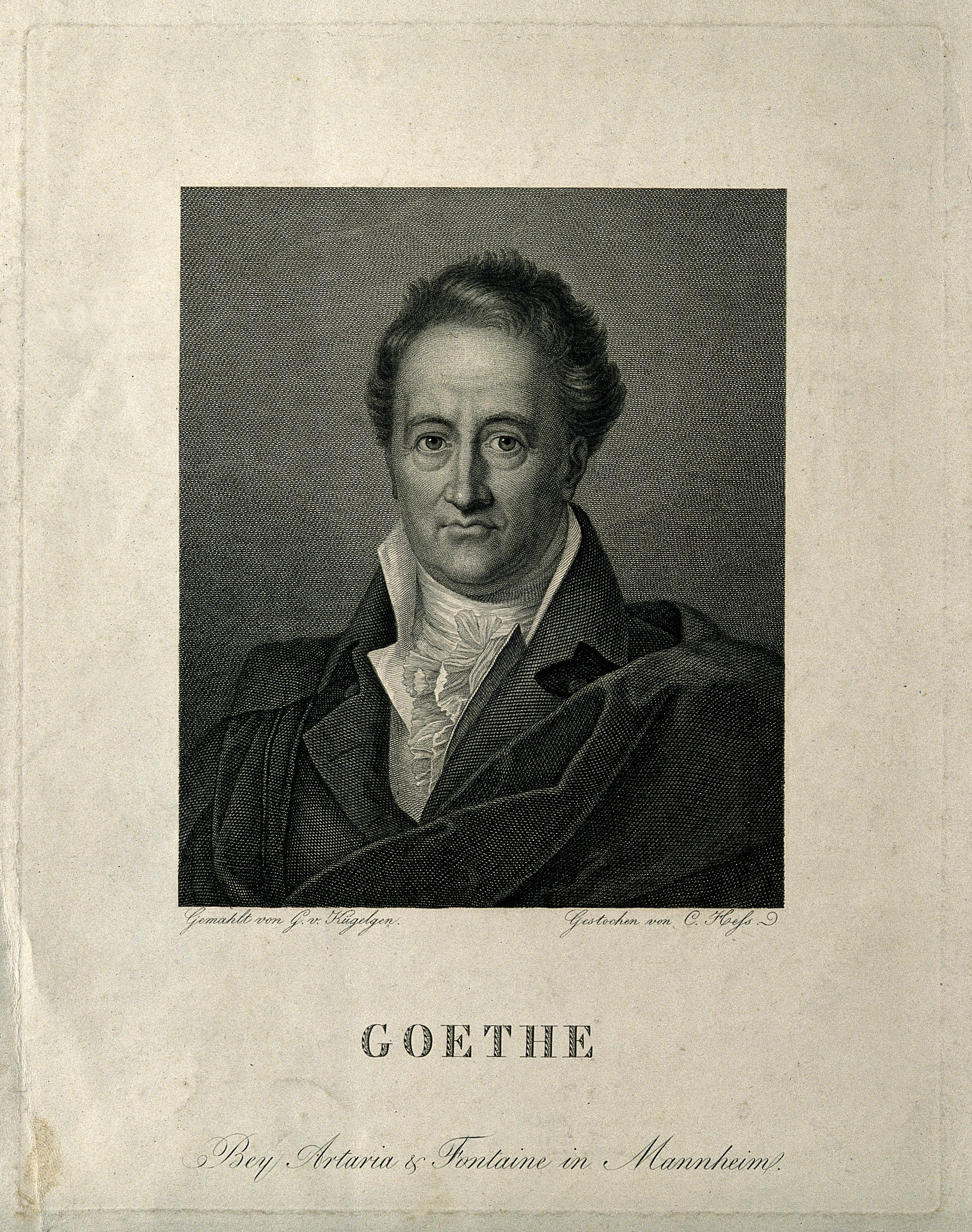
Portrait of Goethe (after Gerhard von Kügelgen)

He was mistreated there so his aunt, Maria Magdalena, who lived in Mannheim, took him in. She was married to the court medallist and gold engraver, Jacob Hohleisen (b. 1707), who took him on as an apprentice. A hunting scene he created on the handle of a Hirschfänger, a type of dagger, brought him to the attention of Maximilian III Joseph, Elector of Bavaria.

As a result, he was able to attend the Kunstakademie Düsseldorf where his talents were noticed by its director, Lambert Krahe. During 1776, he studied engraving in Augsburg and, the following year, worked on the gallery collection that had been initiated by Krahe's son, Peter Joseph Krahe. He became a member of the Academy in 1780, and was promoted to Professor in 1782. That same year, he was appointed as court engraver. He went to Italy in 1787 and remained there for four years, studying his art in Naples and Rome, where he met Johann Wolfgang Goethe.

In 1791, the year after Lambert Krahe's death, Hess married his daughter, Marie Lambertine Katharine Krahe. When the War of the First Coalition began to affect Düsseldorf, they moved about for several years, during which he worked with Francesco Bartolozzi in London. In 1806, the gallery collection he was curating was moved to Munich and he went to work for Maximilian I Joseph of Bavaria.

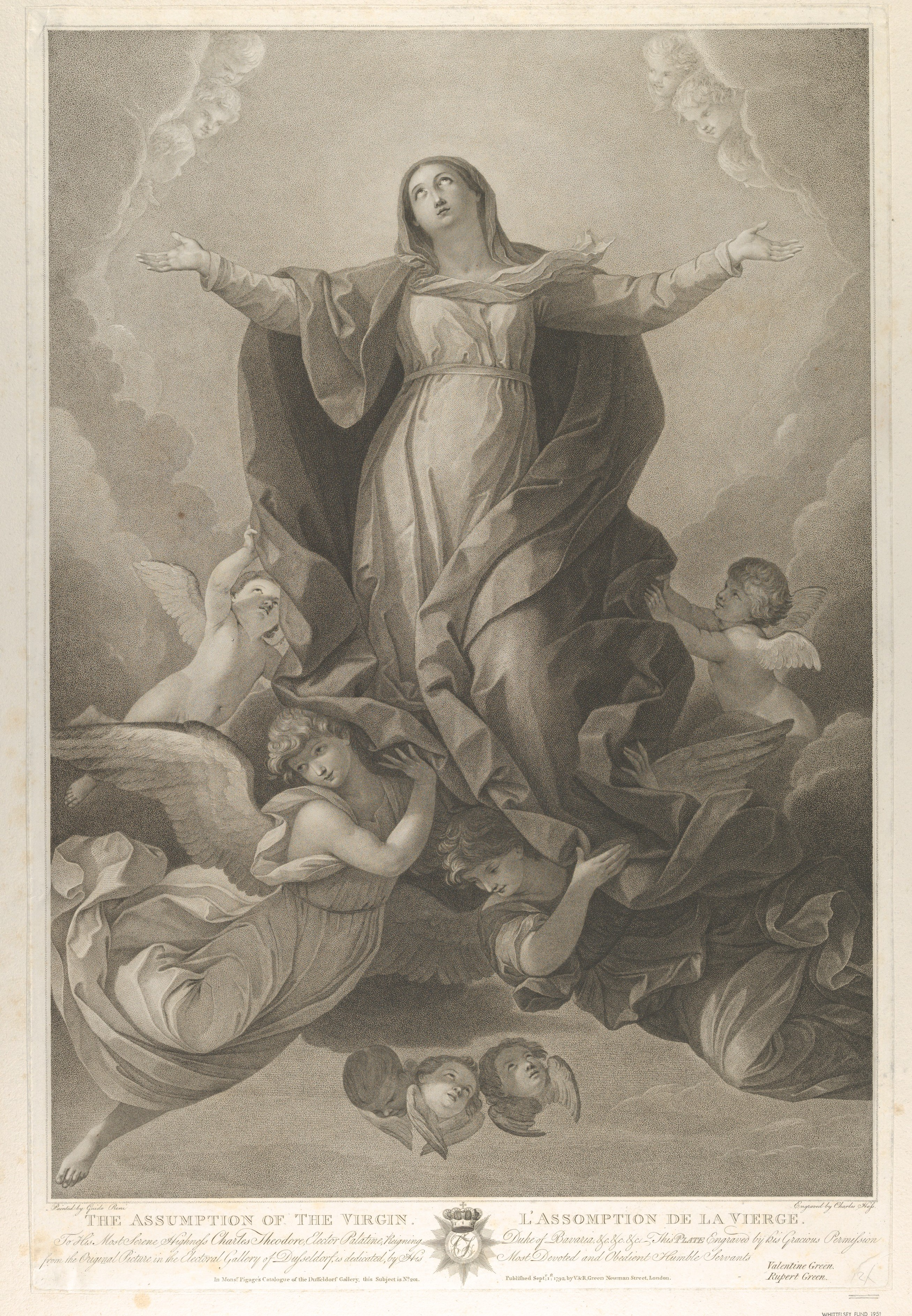
The Assumption of the Virgin (after Guido Reni)

He and Marie had six children; two daughters, and four sons who all became artists: Peter, Heinrich, Franz (1795-1819), and Karl. His daughter, Katharina, married the architect Friedrich von Gärtner. She died in 1832 and, two years later, he married her sister, Lambertine (1804-1852).

Heßstraße, in Maxvorstadt, was named after him and his sons.
