= Peter von Hess =

German painter (1792–1871)

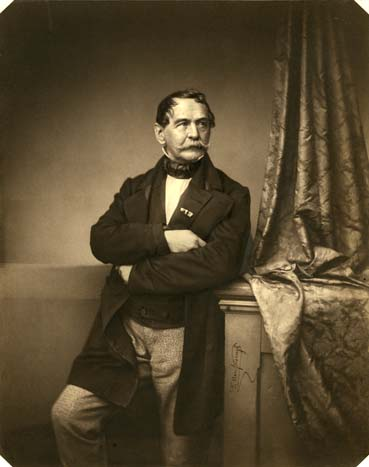
- Photograph of Hess by Franz Hanfstaengl
- Born: 29 July 1792; Düsseldorf, Holy Roman Empire
- Died: 4 April 1871 (aged 78); München, German Empire
- Known for: Painting

Peter Heinrich Lambert von Hess (29 July 1792 – 4 April 1871) was a German painter, known for historic paintings, especially of the Napoleonic Wars and the Greek War of Independence.

== Life ==
Peter von Hess initially received training from his father Carl Ernst Christoph Hess. He accompanied his younger brother Heinrich Maria to Munich in 1806, and enrolled at the Munich Academy at the age of sixteen. He also trained under Wilhelm von Kobell.

During the Napoleonic Wars, he was allowed to join the staff of General Wrede, who commanded the Bavarians in the military operations which led to the abdication of Napoleon. There he gained novel experiences of war and a taste for extensive travel. During this time, von Hess painted his first battle pieces. In 1818, he spent some time in Italy where he painted landscapes and various Italian scenes and travelled to Naples with Joseph Petzl and a group of other Bavarian artists.

In 1833, at King Ludwig I of Bavaria's request, he accompanied Otto of Greece to the newly formed Kingdom of Greece, where at Athens he gathered materials for pictures of the war of liberation. The sketches which he then made were placed, forty in number, in the Pinakothek, after being copied in wax on a large scale by Nilsen, in the northern arcades of the Hofgarten at Munich. King Otho's entrance into Nauplia was the subject of a large and crowded canvas now in the Pinakothek, which Hess executed in person.

== Evaluation ==
Peter von Hess's work has been evaluated positively for its execution but some have questioned its boldness and congeniality.

He is buried in the Alter Südfriedhof in Munich.

== Works ==
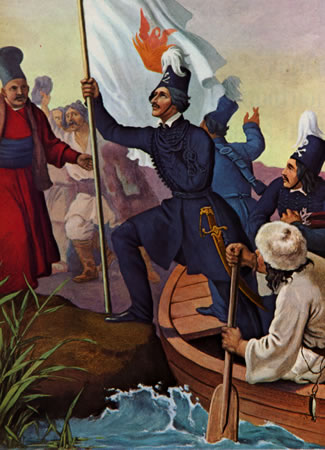
Alexander Ypsilantis crosses the Pruth

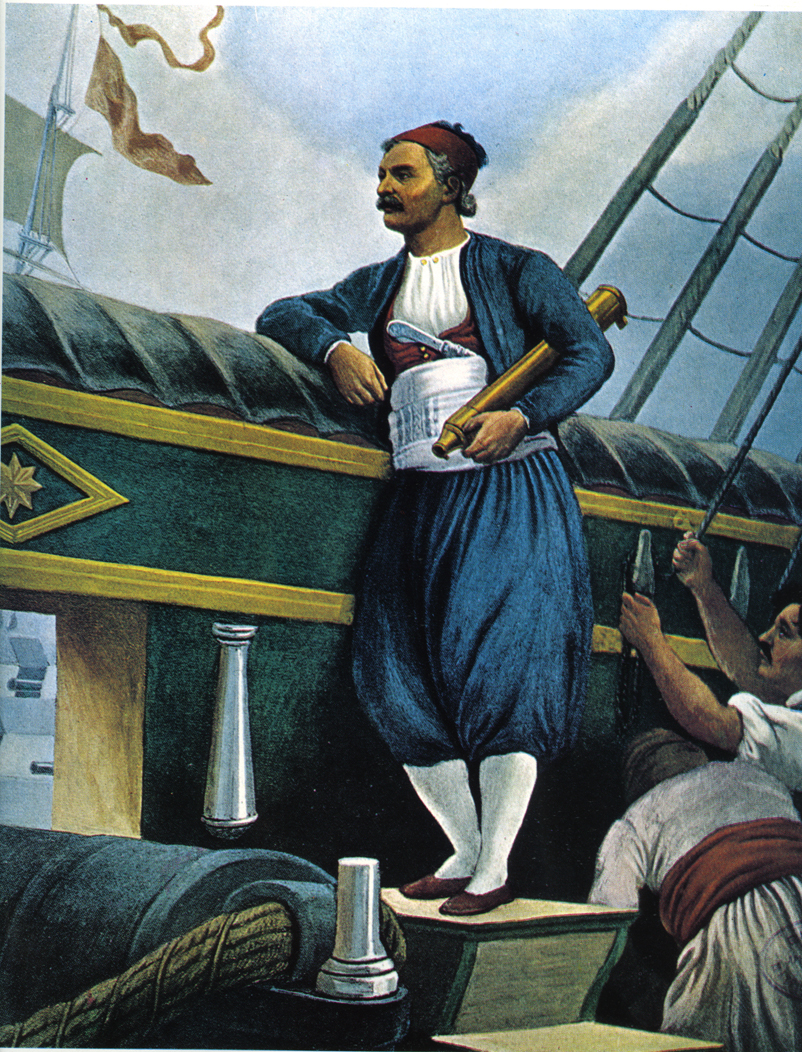
Andreas Vokos Miaoulis

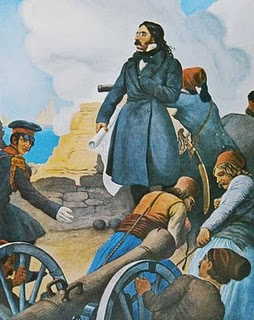
Alexandros Mavrokordatos defends Missolonghi

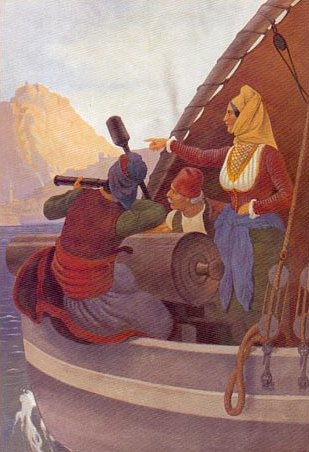
Bouboulina

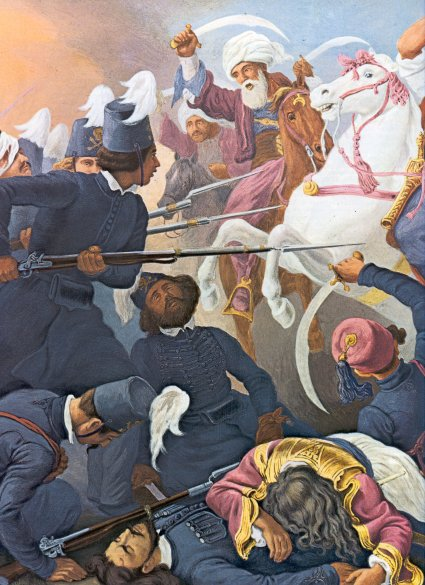
Sacred Band fighting at Dragatsani

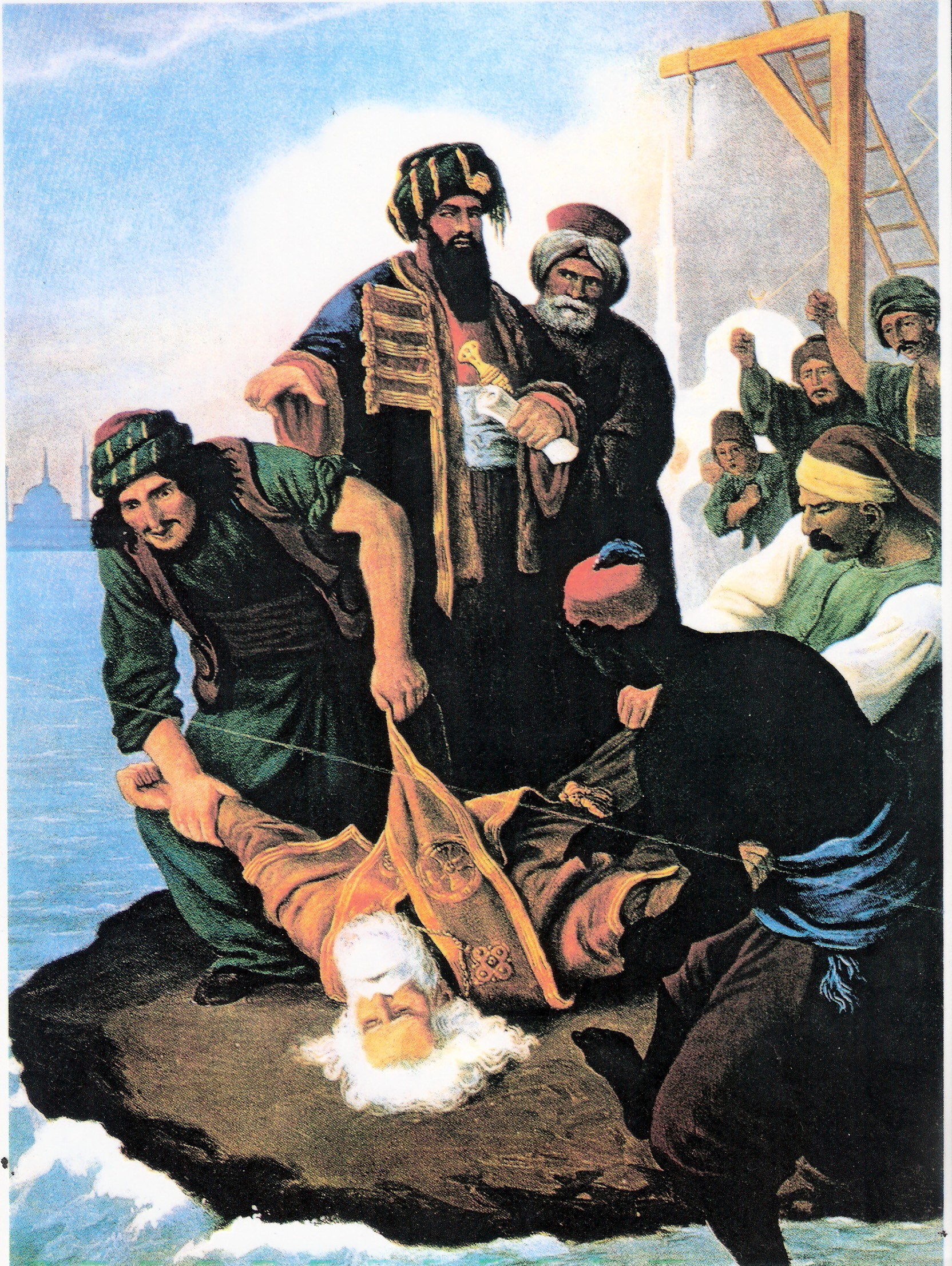
The hanging of Patriarch Gregory V of Constantinople

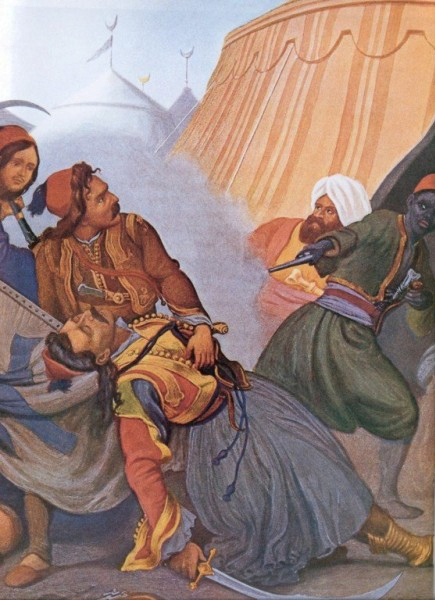
Botsaris dying in Karpenisi

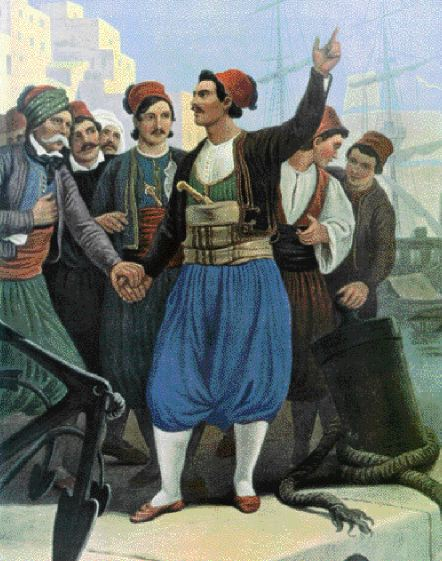
Antonis Oikonomou

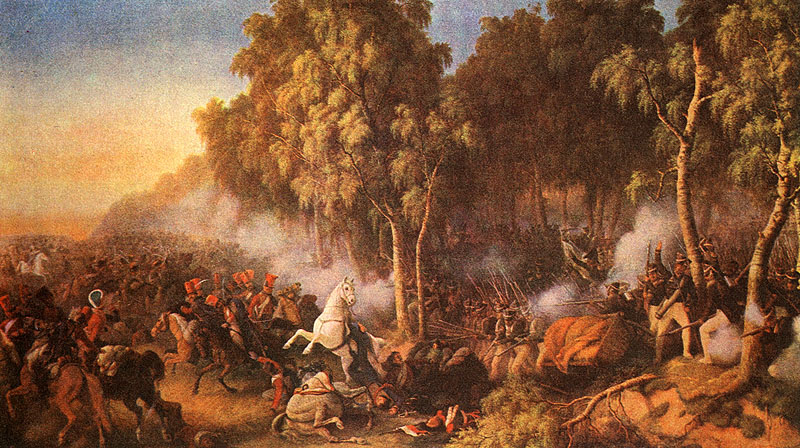
(First) Battle of Krasnoi
(14 August 1812)

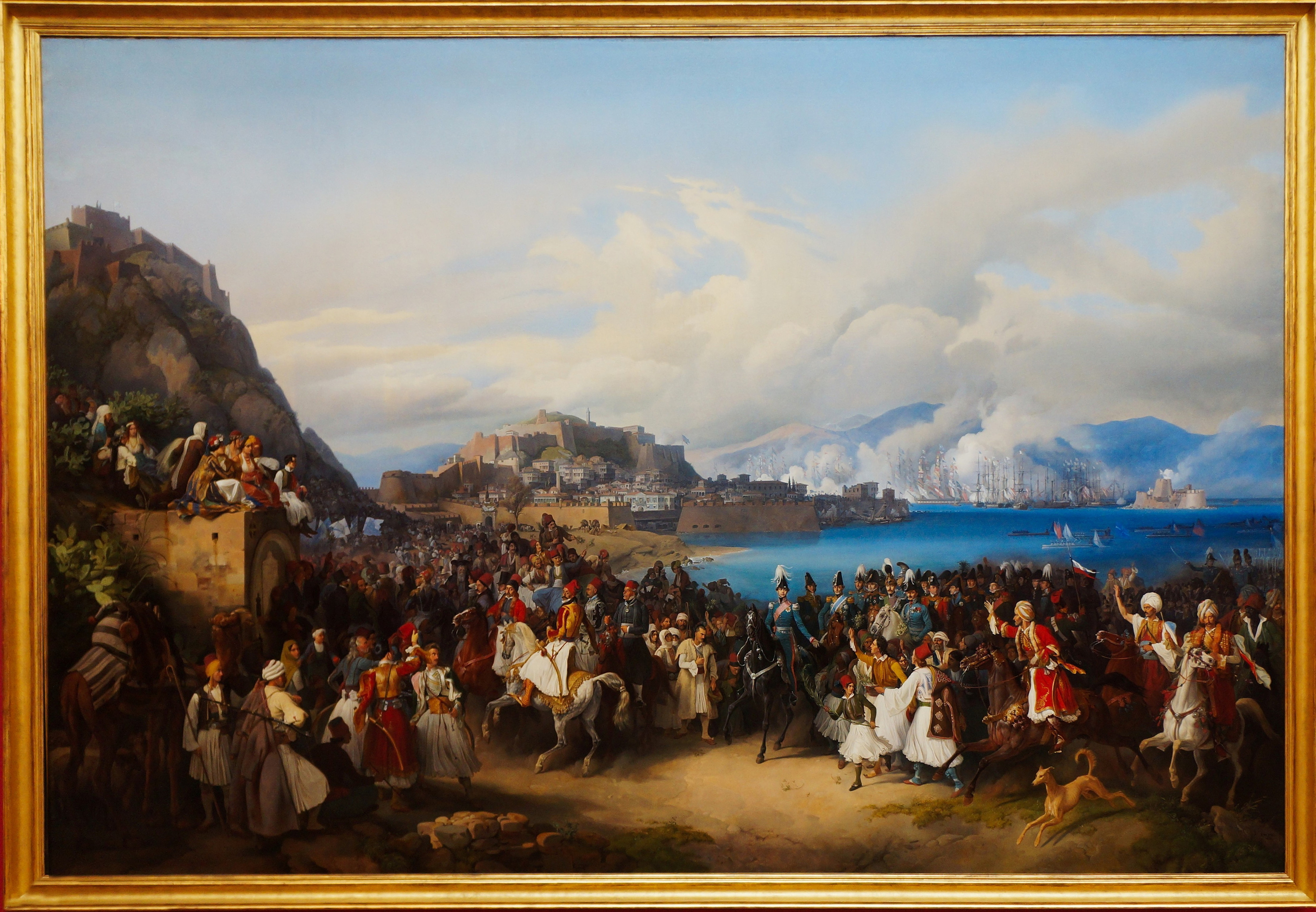
The Entry of King Othon of Greece into Nauplia (1835)

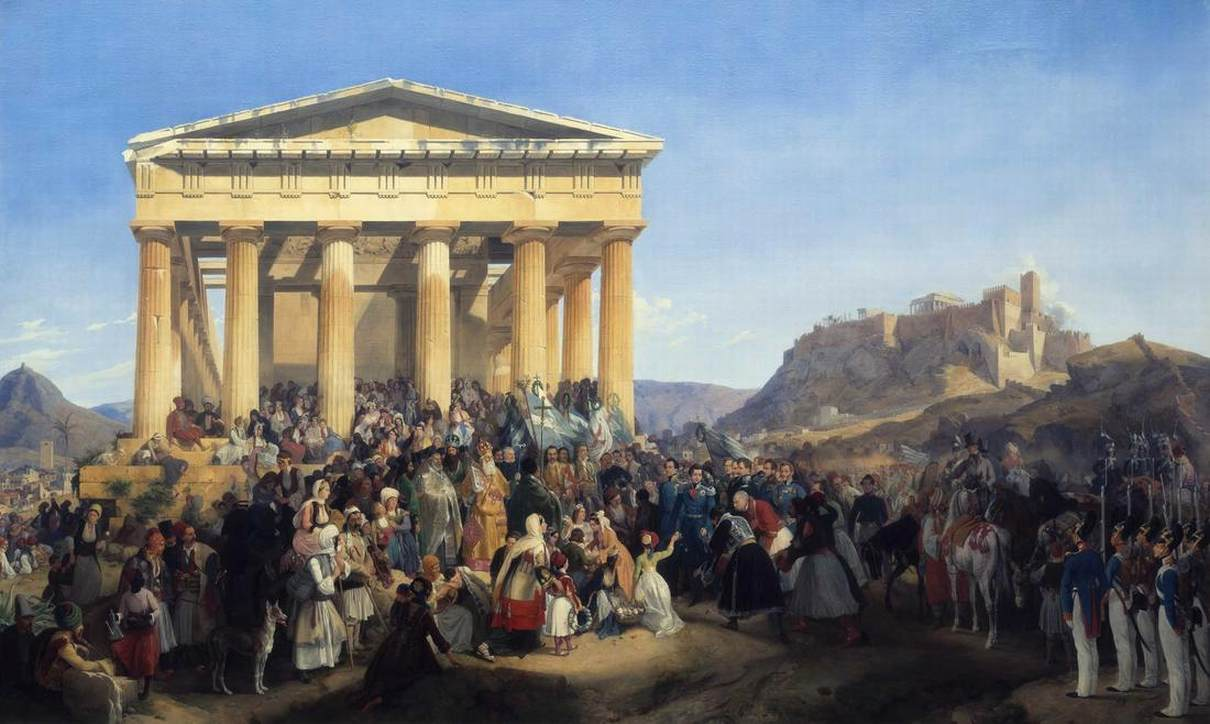
The Entry of King Otto of Greece into Athens (1839)

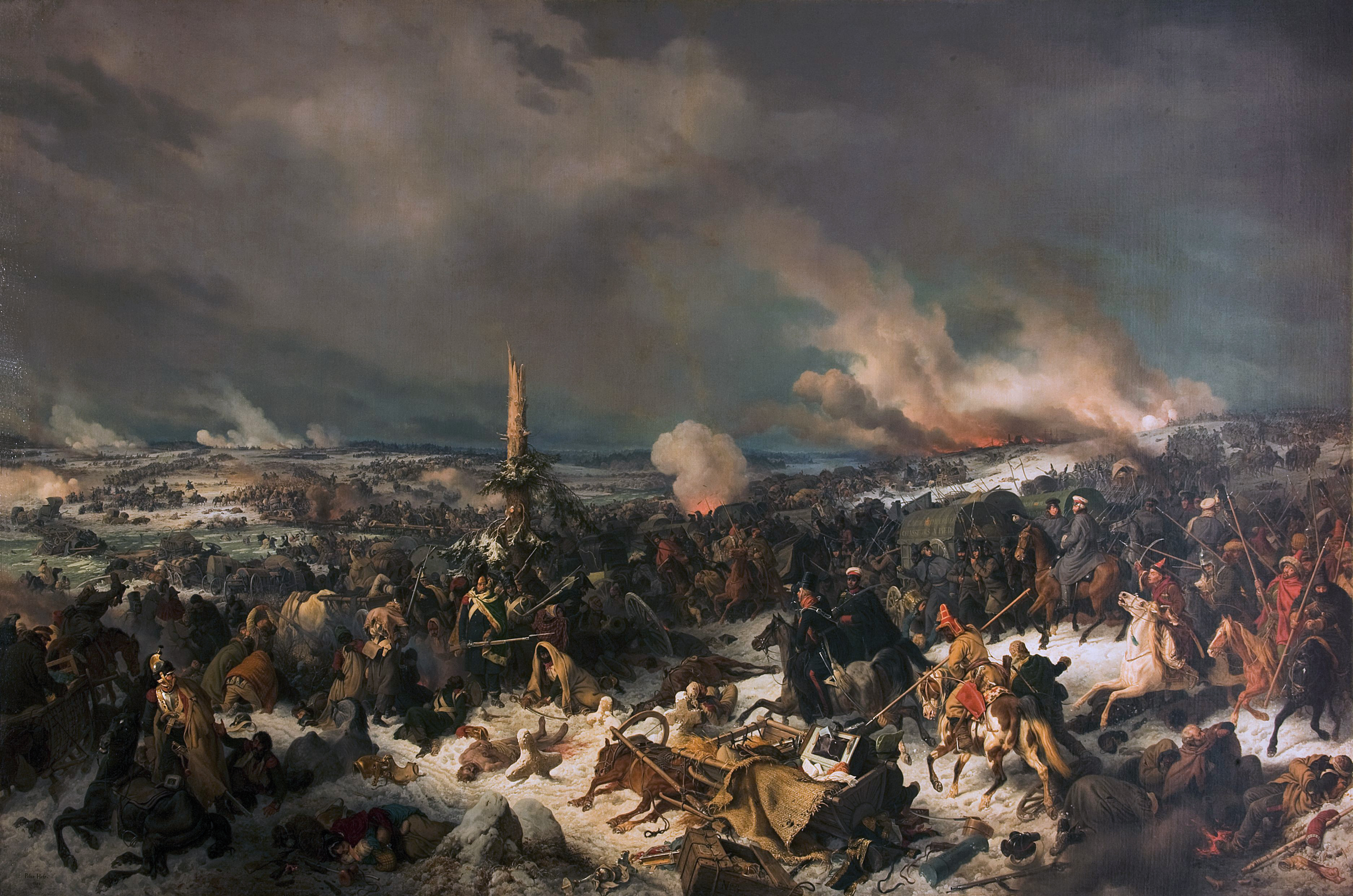
Crossing the Berezina River (1844)

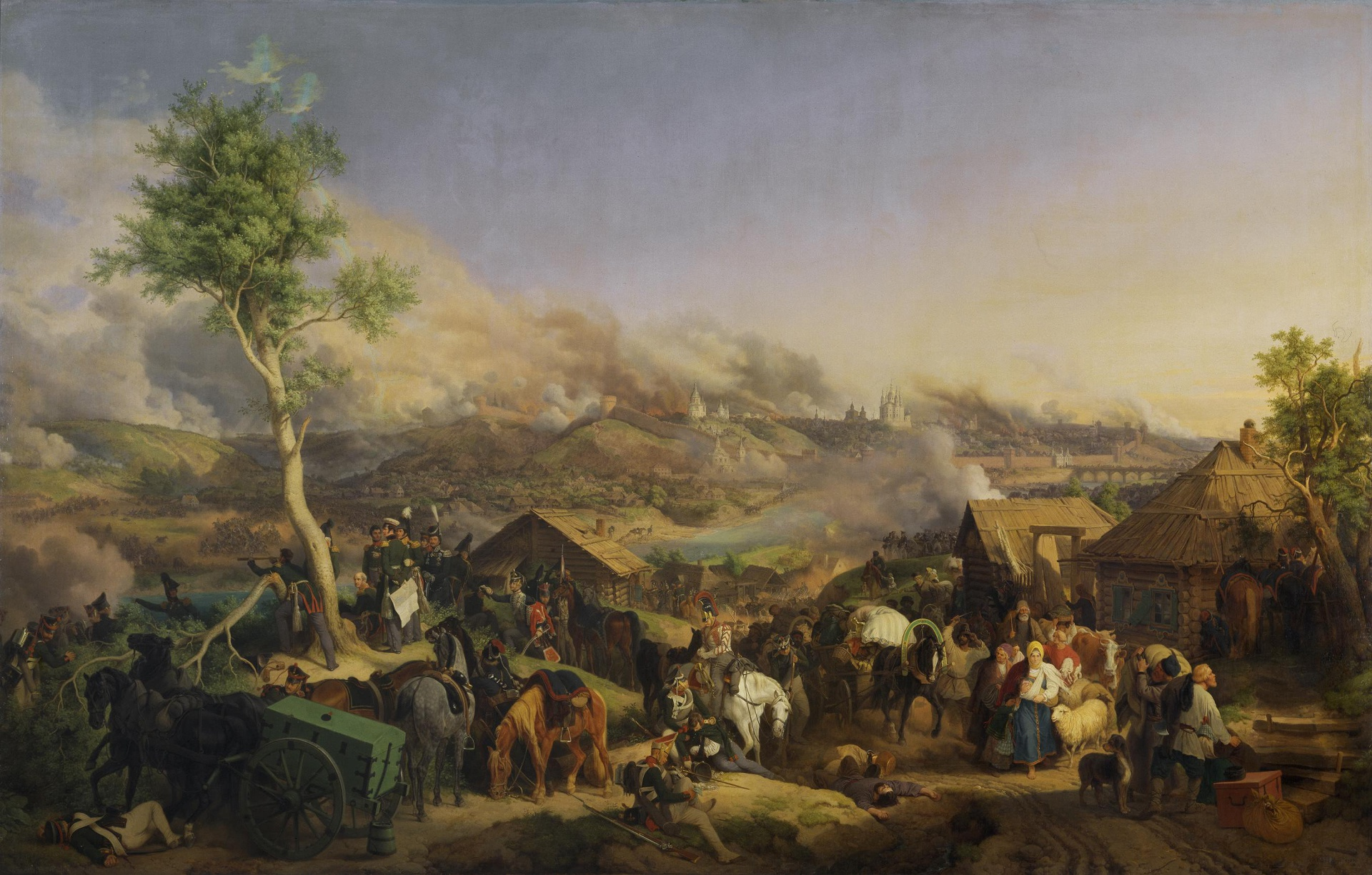
The Battle of Smolensk (1846)
