= The Battle of Smolensk (Von Hess) =

Painting by Peter von Hess

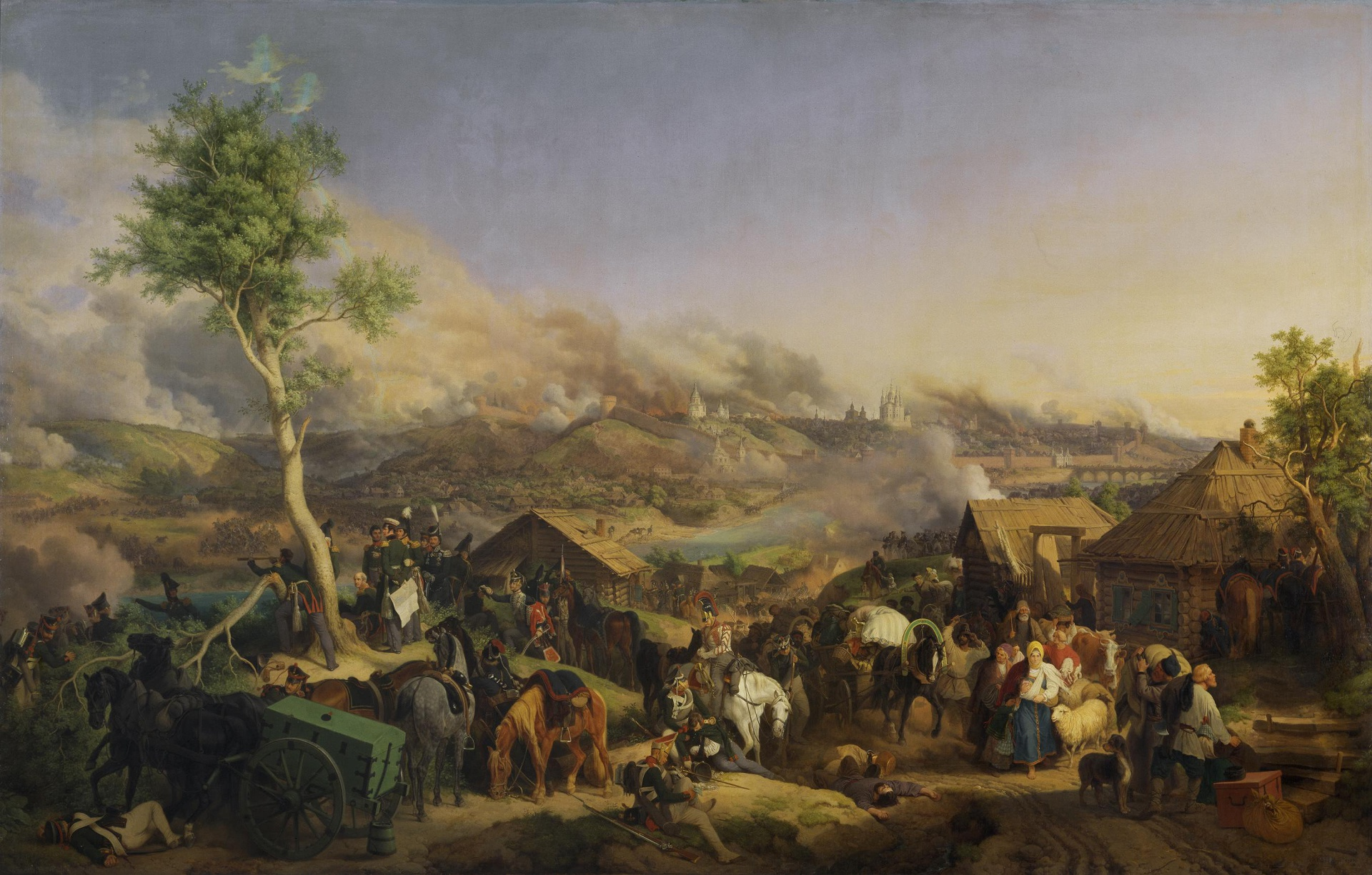
- Artist: Peter von Hess
- Year: 1846
- Medium: Oil on canvas
- Dimensions: 234 cm × 356 cm (92 in × 140 in)
- Location: Hermitage Museum, Saint Petersburg

The Battle of Smolensk is an 1846 history painting by the German artist Peter von Hess. It depicts the Battle of Smolensk fought in 1812 during the French Invasion of Russia. It shows the second day of the battle, 17 August, when the Russians had been forced to abandon the city of Smolensk itself.

The composition focuses on the Russian commanders in particular. Barclay de Tolly is shown seated by the tree on the left. Other generals seen nearby include Aleksey Yermolov and the Cossack Matvei Platov. in the distance across the River Dnieper Smolensk can be seen with smoke rising above it due to the Old City catching fire during the French bombardment.

This was one of a series of pictures featuring scenes from the invasion of 1812. The painting is now in the collection of the Hermitage Museum in Saint Petersburg.

== Bibliography ==
- Lieven, Dominic. Russia Against Napoleon: The Battle for Europe, 1807 to 1814. Penguin UK, 2010.
- Nedd, Andrew M. History and Myth in Pictorial Narratives of the Russian 'Patriotic War', 1812–1914. Springer Nature, 2024.
