= Heinrich Maria von Hess =

German painter (1798–1863)

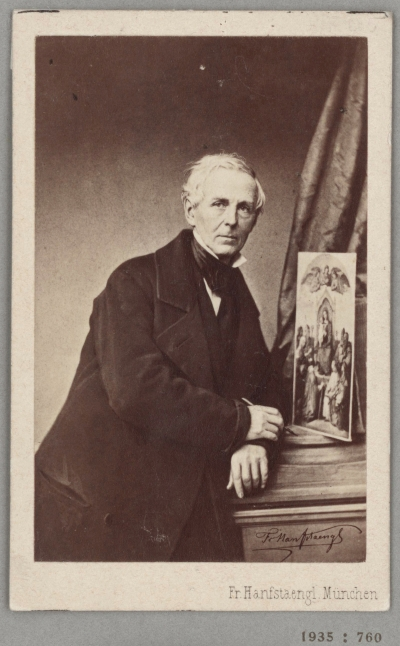
Heninrich Maria von Hess. Photograph by Franz Hanfstaengl

Heinrich Maria von Hess (19 April 1798 in Düsseldorf – 29 Märch 1863 in Munich) was a German painter, a member of the Nazarene movement.

== Biography ==
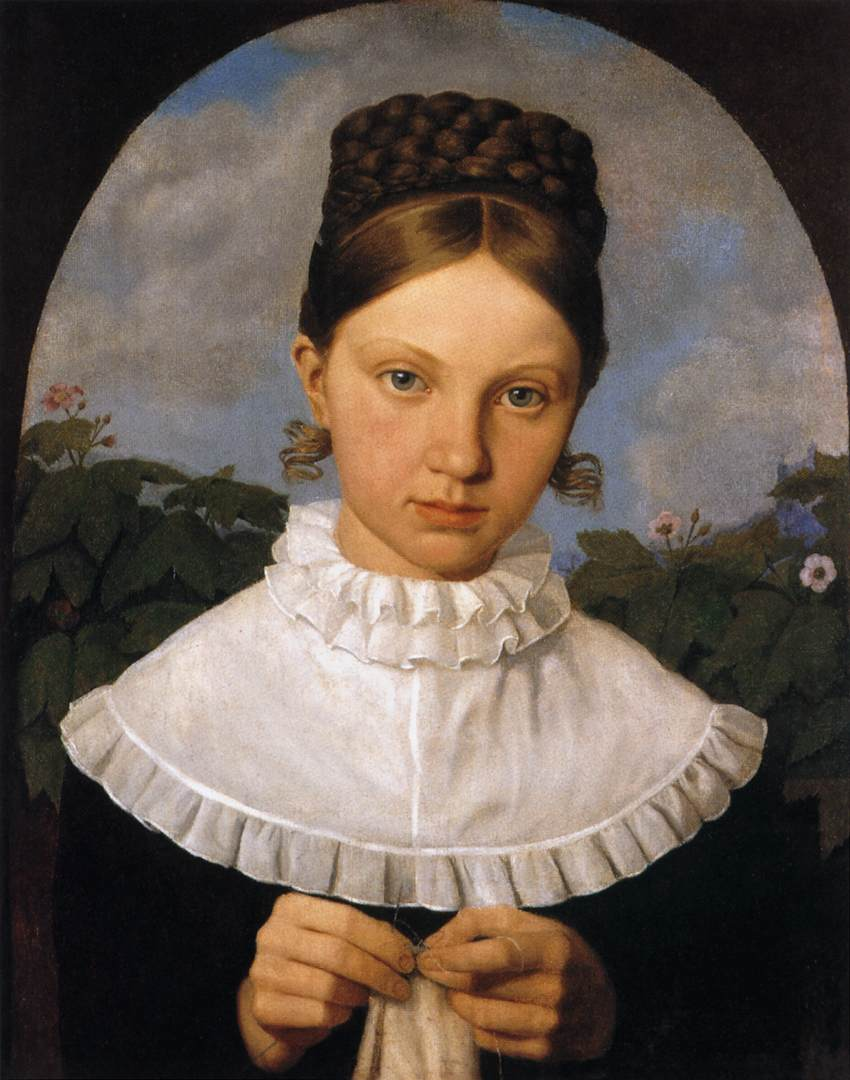
Portrait of Fanny Gail

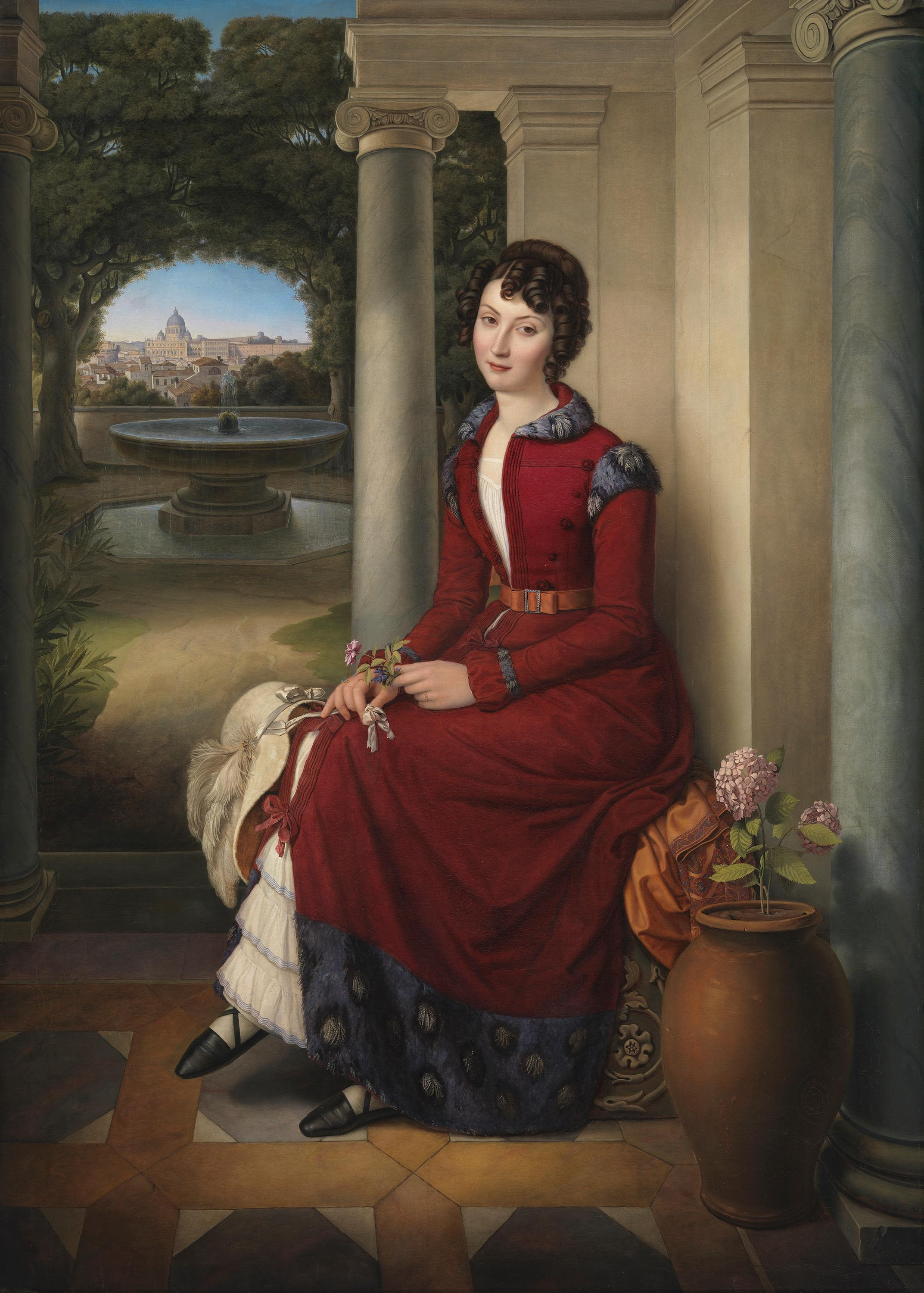
Portrait of Marchesa Marianna Florenzi (1824)

Hess was born at Düsseldorf and brought up to the profession of art by his father, the engraver Carl Ernst Christoph Hess. Carl Hess had already acquired a name when in 1806 the elector of Bavaria, having been raised to a kingship by Napoleon, transferred the Düsseldorf academy and gallery to Munich. Carl Hess accompanied the academy to its new home, and there continued the education of his children.

Hess studied at the Academy in Munich from 1813-1817 under Johann Peter von Langer. Heinrich Hess's skills and reputation attracted the attention of King Maximilian, who sent him in 1821 to Rome, with a stipend, During his four years there, he came under the influence of Johann Friedrich Overbeck. A copy Hess made of Raphael's Parnassus, and the study of great examples of monumental design, probably caused him to become a painter of ecclesiastical subjects on a large scale. In 1826 he was made professor of painting and later, director of all the art collections at Munich.

He decorated the Glyptothek and the Allerheiligen-Hofkirche at Munich with frescoes; and his cartoons were selected for glass windows in the cathedrals of Cologne and Regensburg. One of his most notable assignments followed: the cycle of frescoes in the St. Boniface's Abbey, Munich, by order of King Ludwig I of Bavaria, and the monumental picture of the Virgin and Child enthroned between the four doctors, and receiving the homage of the four patrons of the Munich churches (now in the Pinakothek).

Before testing his strength as a composer Heinrich Hess tried genre, an example of which is the Pilgrims entering Rome, now in the Munich gallery. He also executed portraits, and twice had sittings from Thorwaldsen (Pinakothek and Schack collections).

His last work, the Lord's Supper, was found unfinished in his atelier after his death in 1863.

== Evaluation ==
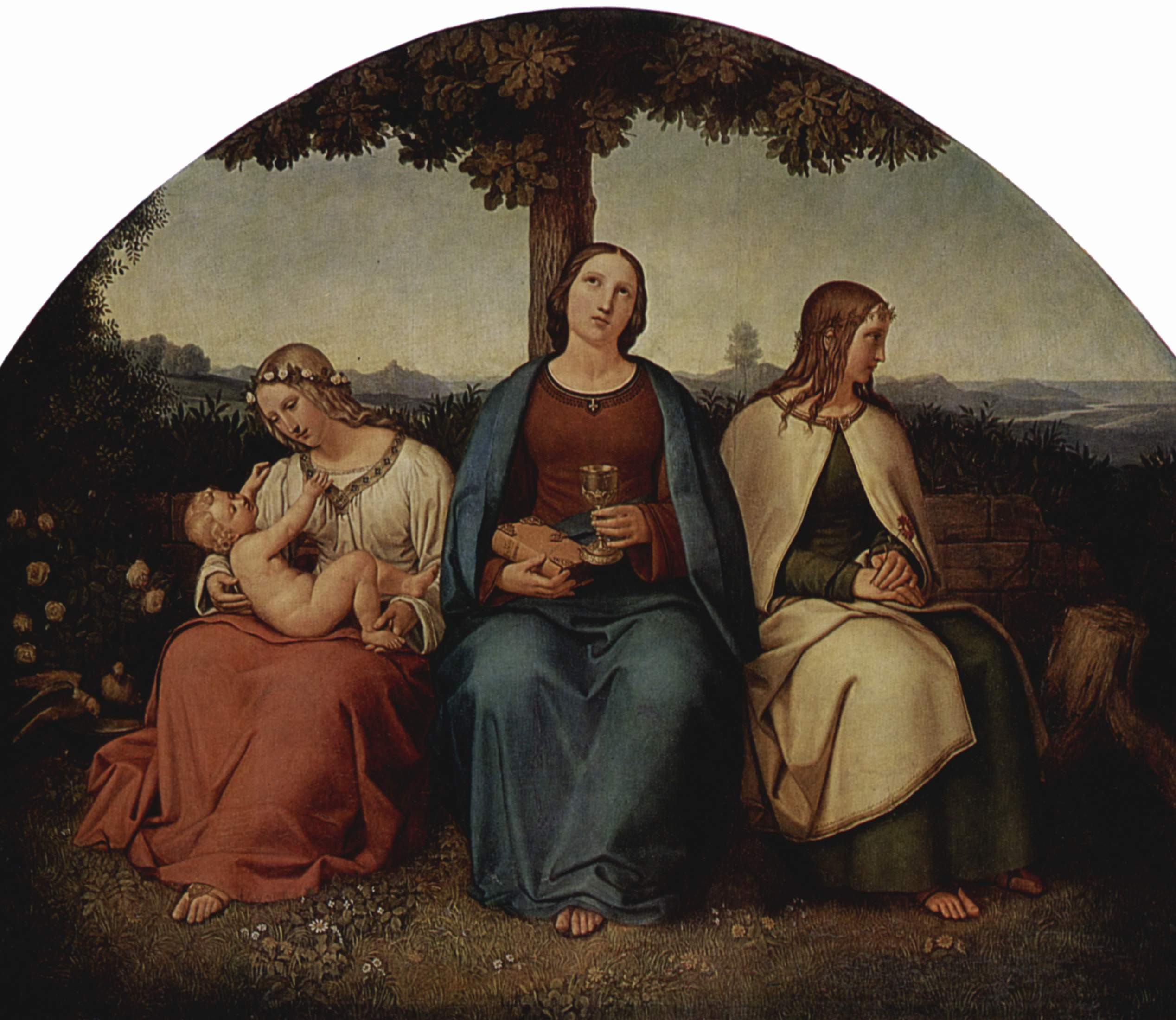
Faith, Love, Hope (1819)

The 1911 Encyclopædia Britannica assesses his work as follows:

His fame rests on the frescoes representing scenes from the Old and New Testaments in the Allerheiligencapelle, and the episodes from the life of St Boniface and other German apostles in the basilica of Munich. Here he holds rank second to none but Overbeck in monumental painting, being always true to nature though mindful of the traditions of Christian art, earnest and simple in feeling, yet lifelike and powerful in expression. Through him and his pupils the sentiment of religious art was preserved and extended in the Munich school.
