= Pochinkovsky District, Smolensk Oblast =

Pochinkovsky District Починковский район (Russian)
- District
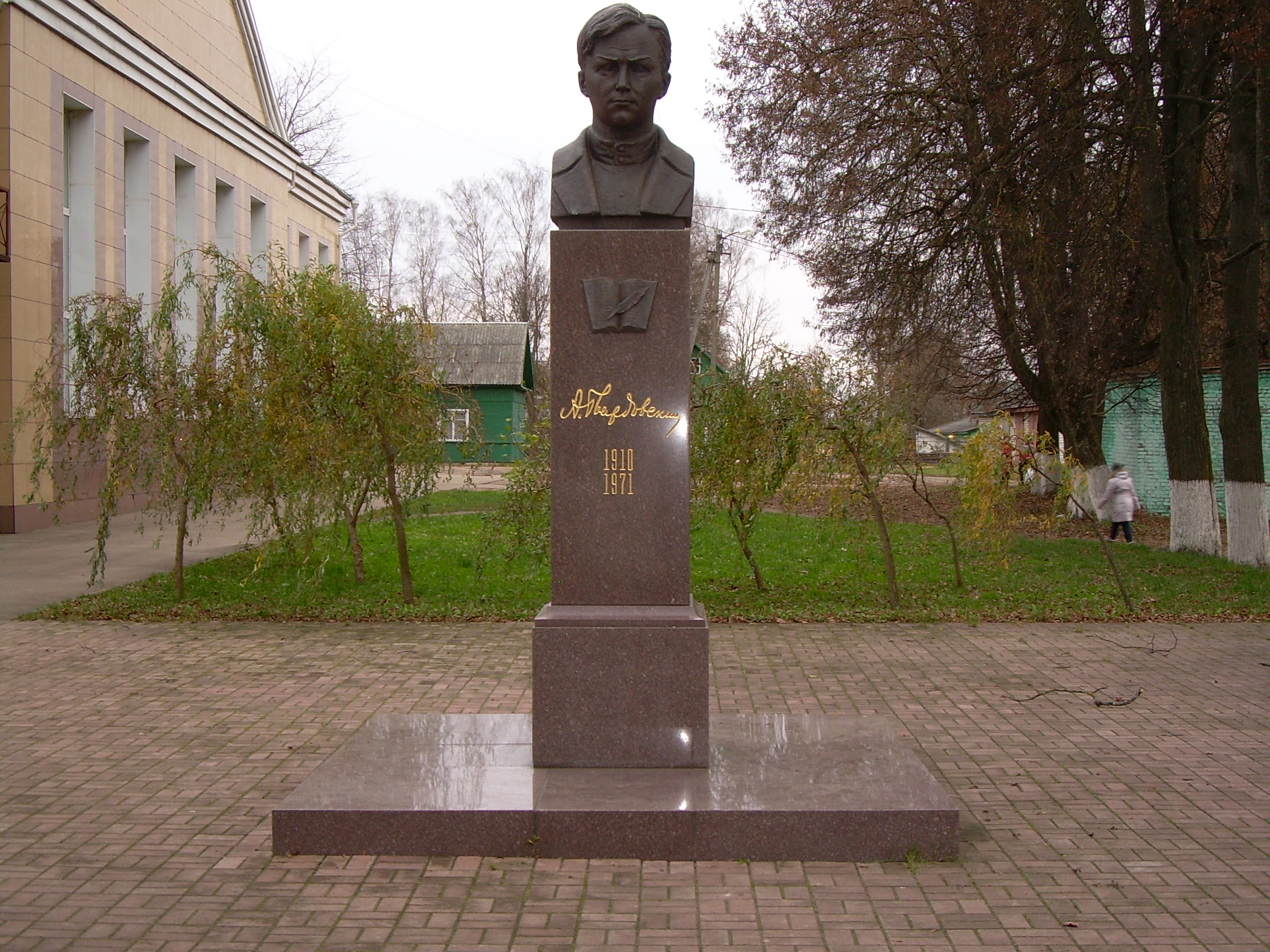
- Memorial to Aleksandr Tvardovsky, Pochinok, Pochinkovsky District

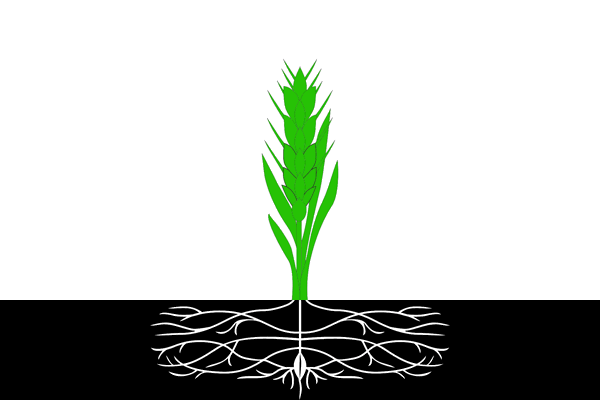
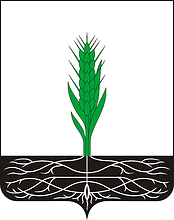
- Flag Coat of arms
- Location of Pochinkovsky District in Smolensk Oblast
- Coordinates: 54°24′N 32°27′E
- Country: Russia
- Federal subject: Smolensk Oblast
- Established: 1 October 1929
- Administrative center: Pochinok

Area
  - Total: 2,380.75 km^{2} (919.21 sq mi)

Population (2010 Census)
  - Total: 30,959
  - Density: 13.004/km^{2} (33.680/sq mi)
  - Urban: 28.3%
  - Rural: 71.7%

Administrative structure
  - Administrative divisions: 1 Urban settlements, 16 Rural settlements
  - Inhabited localities: 1 cities/towns, 228 rural localities

Municipal structure
  - Municipally incorporated as: Pochinkovsky Municipal District
  - Municipal divisions: 1 urban settlements, 16 rural settlements
- Time zone: UTC+3 (MSK)
- OKTMO ID: 66633000
- Website: http://pochinok.admin-smolensk.ru/

Pochinkovsky District (Russian: Починковский райо́н) is an administrative and municipal district (raion), one of the twenty-five in Smolensk Oblast, Russia. It is located in the southern central part of the oblast and borders with Kardymovsky District in the north, Glinkovsky District in the northeast, Yelninsky District in the east, Roslavlsky District in the southeast, Shumyachsky District in the south, Khislavichsky District in the southwest, Monastyrshchinsky District in the west, and with Smolensky District in the northwest. The area of the district is 2,380.75 square kilometers (919.21 sq mi). Its administrative center is the town of Pochinok. Population: 30,959 (2010 Census); 37,537 (2002 census); 44,162 (1989 Soviet census). The population of Pochinok accounts for 28.3% of the district's total population.

== Geography ==
The whole area of the district belongs to the drainage basin of the Dnieper. Most of the area belongs to the drainage basin of the Sozh, a left tributary of the Dnieper. The Sozh crosses the area of the district in the northwest. The biggest tributaries of the Sozh within the district are the Khmara and the Ostyor (both left). The Ostyor has its source in the district. Another major left tributary of the Dnieper, the Desna, also crosses the area of the district in the southeast, and a minor area in the southeast of the district belongs to the drainage basin of the Desna. The Dnieper itself makes the border between Pochinkovsky and Kardymovsky Districts, the rivers in the northern part of the district flow into the Dnieper. The district is situated in the Smolensk Upland, with a hilly landscape.

== History ==
In the course of the administrative reform carried out in 1708 by Peter the Great, the area was included into Smolensk Governorate and remained there until 1929, with the exception of the brief period between 1775 and 1796, when Smolensk Governorate was transformed into Smolensk Viceroyalty. The area was split between Smolensky, Krasninsky, Yelninsky, and Roslavlsky Uyezds. Pochinok has been known since 1811 as a village. It belonged to Yelninnsky Uyezd. In 1926, it was granted a town status. In October 1928, Yelninsky Uyezd was abolished and split between Smolensky, Roslavlsky, and Vyazemsky Uyezds.

On 12 July 1929, governorates and uyezds were abolished, and Pochinkovsky District with the administrative center in the town of Pochinok was established on the territories which previously belonged to Smolensky, Krasninsky, and Roslavslsky Districts of Smolensk Governorate. The district belonged to Roslavl Okrug of Western Oblast. On August 1, 1930, the okrugs were abolished, and the districts were subordinated directly to the oblast. On 27 September 1937 Western Oblast was abolished and split between Oryol and Smolensk Oblasts. Pochinkovsky District was transferred to Smolensk Oblast. Between 1941 and 1943, during WWII, the district was occupied by German troops.

On 12 July 1929, Stodolishchensky District with the administrative center in the selo of Stodolishche was established on the areas which previously belonged to Roslavlsky and Yelninsky Uyezds of Smolensk Governorate. It belonged to Roslavl Okrug of Western Oblast. In 1937, the raion was transferred to Smolensk Oblast. In 1961 it was abolished and split between Pochinkovsky and Roslavlsky District.

== Economy ==
=== Industry ===
There are enterprises of textile and food industries in the district.

=== Agriculture ===
The main agricultural specializations of the district are cattle breeding with meat and milk production, as well as poultry breeding.

=== Transportation ===
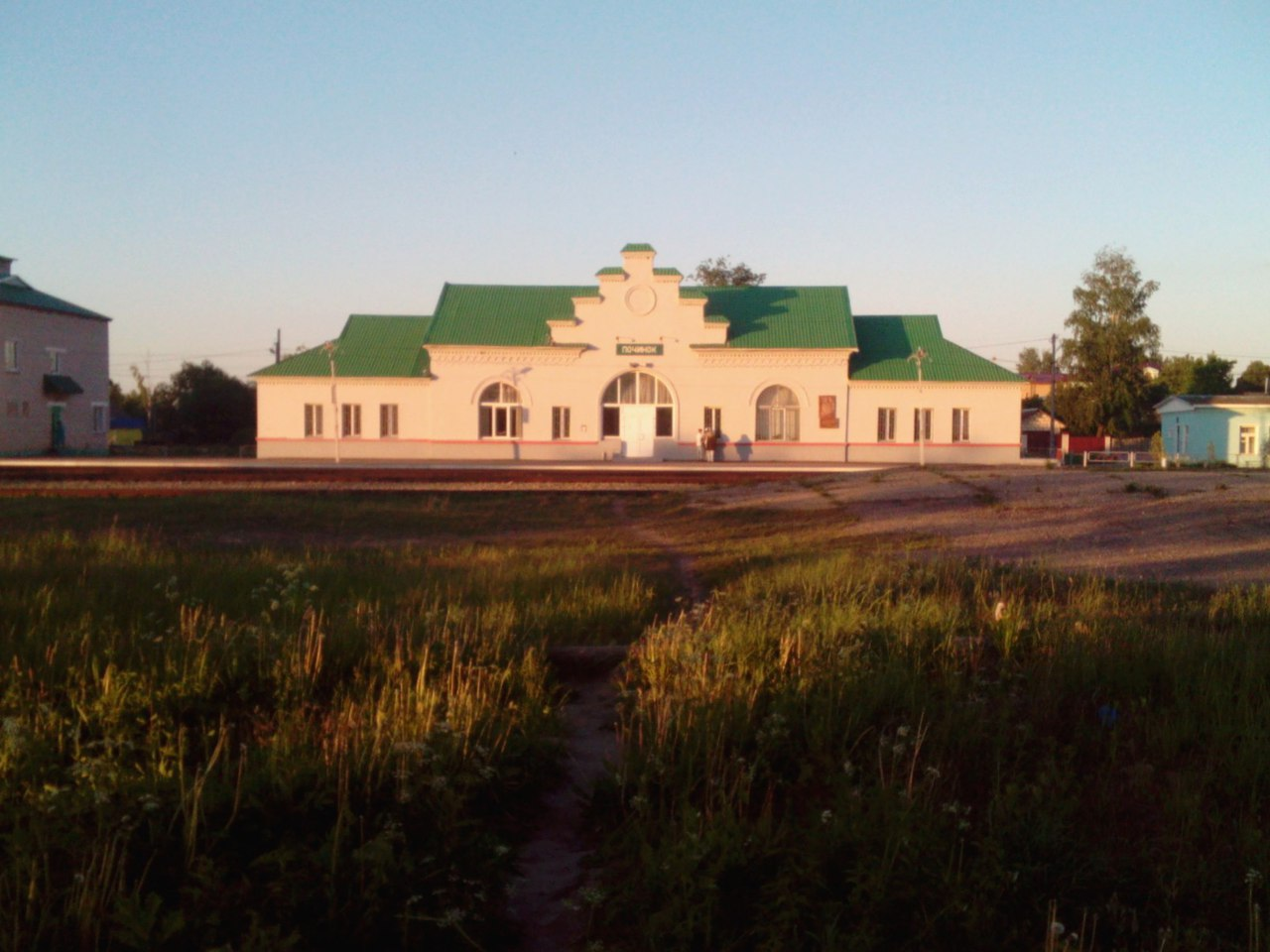
Pochinok railway station

A railway connecting Smolensk and Bryansk crosses the district from northwest to southeast. Pochinok is the main railway station within the district.

The R120 road (formerly A141), which connects Smolensk with Bryansk and Oryol, crosses the district from the northwest to southeast, passing close to Pochinok. There is a road between Pochinok and Yelnya, as well as another one across the border to Mstsislaw where it continues to Orsha and Krychaw. There are also local roads with bus traffic originating from Pochinok.

The Dnieper is navigable within the district, however, there is no organized navigation.

== Culture and recreation ==
In Pochinok, there is a local museum which was opened in 2000. The expositions highlight history of the district.

In the village of Seltso, there is the Museum-Estate of Alexander Tvardovsky. Tvardovsky, a 20th-century Russian poet, was born in this village in 1910, but his family house was destroyed during World War II. In 1988, the estate was reconstructed.
