= Yelninsky District =

Yelninsky District Ельнинский район (Russian)
- District
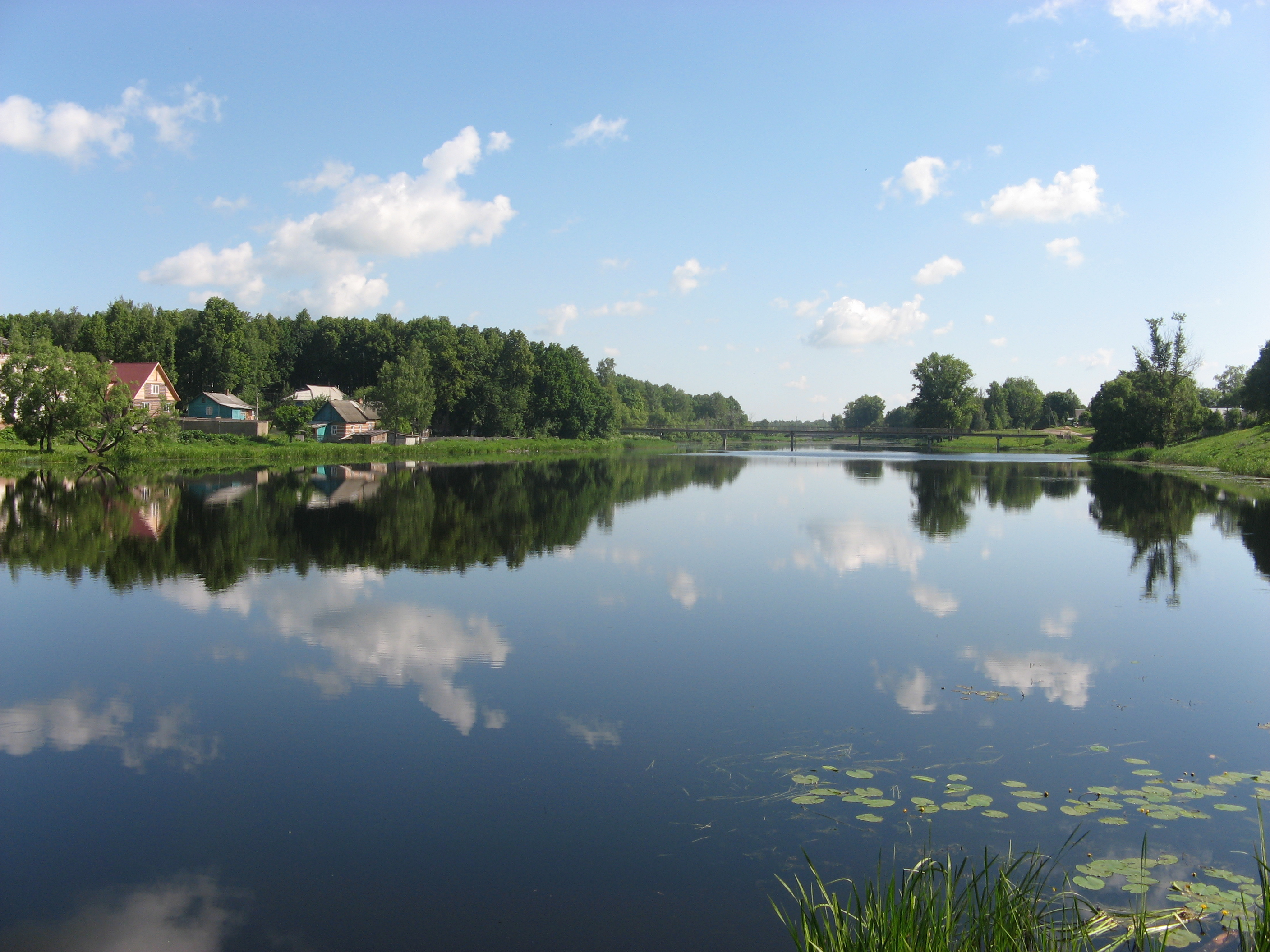
- Desna river in Yelnya, Yelninsky District

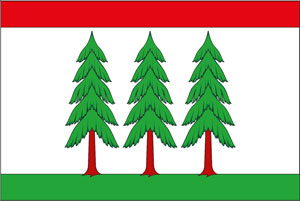
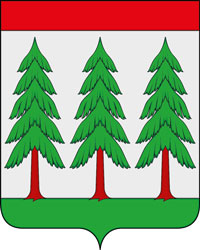
- Flag Coat of arms
- Location of Yelninsky District in Smolensk Oblast
- Coordinates: 54°34′N 33°10′E
- Country: Russia
- Federal subject: Smolensk Oblast
- Established: 1929
- Administrative center: Yelnya

Area
  - Total: 1,808.15 km^{2} (698.13 sq mi)

Population (2010 Census)
  - Total: 14,948
  - Density: 8.2670/km^{2} (21.411/sq mi)
  - Urban: 67.5%
  - Rural: 32.5%

Administrative structure
  - Administrative divisions: 1 Urban settlements, 10 Rural settlements
  - Inhabited localities: 1 cities/towns, 170 rural localities

Municipal structure
  - Municipally incorporated as: Yelninsky Municipal District
  - Municipal divisions: 1 urban settlements, 10 rural settlements
- Time zone: UTC+3 (MSK)
- OKTMO ID: 66619000
- Website: http://elnya-admin.admin-smolensk.ru/

Yelninsky District (Russian: Ельнинский райо́н) is an administrative and municipal district (raion), one of the twenty-five in Smolensk Oblast, Russia. It is located in the southeast of the oblast and borders with Dorogobuzhsky District in the north, Ugransky District in the east, Spas-Demensky District of Kaluga Oblast in the southeast, Roslavlsky District in the south, Pochinkovsky District in the west, and with Glinkovsky District in the northwest. The area of the district is 1,808.15 square kilometers (698.13 sq mi). Its administrative center is the town of Yelnya. Population: 14,948 (2010 Census); 17,457 (2002 census); 19,699 (1989 Soviet census). The population of Yelnya accounts for 67.5% of the district's total population.

== Geography ==
The district is located on the Smolensk Upland and is divided between the drainage basins of the Dnieper and the Volga. The rivers in the southwestern part of the district drain into the Desna River, a major left tributary of the Dnieper. The Desna has its source within the area of the district, and the town of Yelnya is located on the banks of the Desna. The northern part of the district belongs to the drainage basin of the Uzha River, another left tributary of the Dnieper, which also has its source within the district. Minor areas in the western part of the district drain into the Sozh River, a major left tributary of the Dnieper. Another major river which has its source within the area of the district is the Ugra River, a left tributary of the Oka. The eastern part of the district belongs to the drainage basin of the Ugra. 14% of the area of the district is occupied by forest.

== History ==
Yelnya has been first mentioned in chronicles in 1150. The area belonged intermittently to the Principality of Smolensk, the Grand Duchy of Lithuania, the Grand Duchy of Moscow, and Poland. In 1667, according to the Truce of Andrusovo, Yelnya was transferred to Russia. In the course of the administrative reform carried out in 1708 by Peter the Great, the area was included into Smolensk Governorate and remained there until 1929, with the exception of the brief periods between 1713 and 1726, when it belonged to Riga Governorate, and between 1775 and 1796, when Smolensk Governorate was transformed into Smolensk Viceroyalty. It belonged to Yelninsky Uyezd, with the center in Yelnya. In October 1928, Yelninsky Uyezd was abolished and split between Smolensky, Roslavlsky, and Vyazemsky Uyezds.

On 12 July 1929, governorates and uyezds were abolished, and Yelninsky District with the administrative center in the town of Yelnya was established on the territories which previously belonged to Yelninsky and Durogobuzhsky Uyezds. The district belonged to Smolensk Okrug of Western Oblast. On August 1, 1930 the okrugs were abolished, and the districts were subordinated directly to the oblast. On 27 September 1937 Western Oblast was abolished and split between Oryol and Smolensk Oblasts. Yelninsky District was transferred to Smolensk Oblast. Between 1941 and 1943, during WWII, the district was occupied by German troops. In 1961, Glinkovsky District was merged into Yelninsky District, but in 1980 it was re-established.

== Economy ==
=== Industry ===
There are enterprises of food, construction, and timber industries in the district.

=== Agriculture ===
The main agricultural specializations of the district are cattle breeding with meat and milk production, as well as crops, beans, and potato growing.

=== Transportation ===
The railway connecting Smolensk and Sukhinichi via Spas-Demensk crosses the district from northwest to southeast. Yelnya is the largest railway station in the district. There is infrequent passenger navigation.

Yelnya is connected by roads with Safonovo (where it has access to the M1 highway connecting Moscow and Smolensk), with Pochinok, and with Roslavl.

== Culture and recreation ==
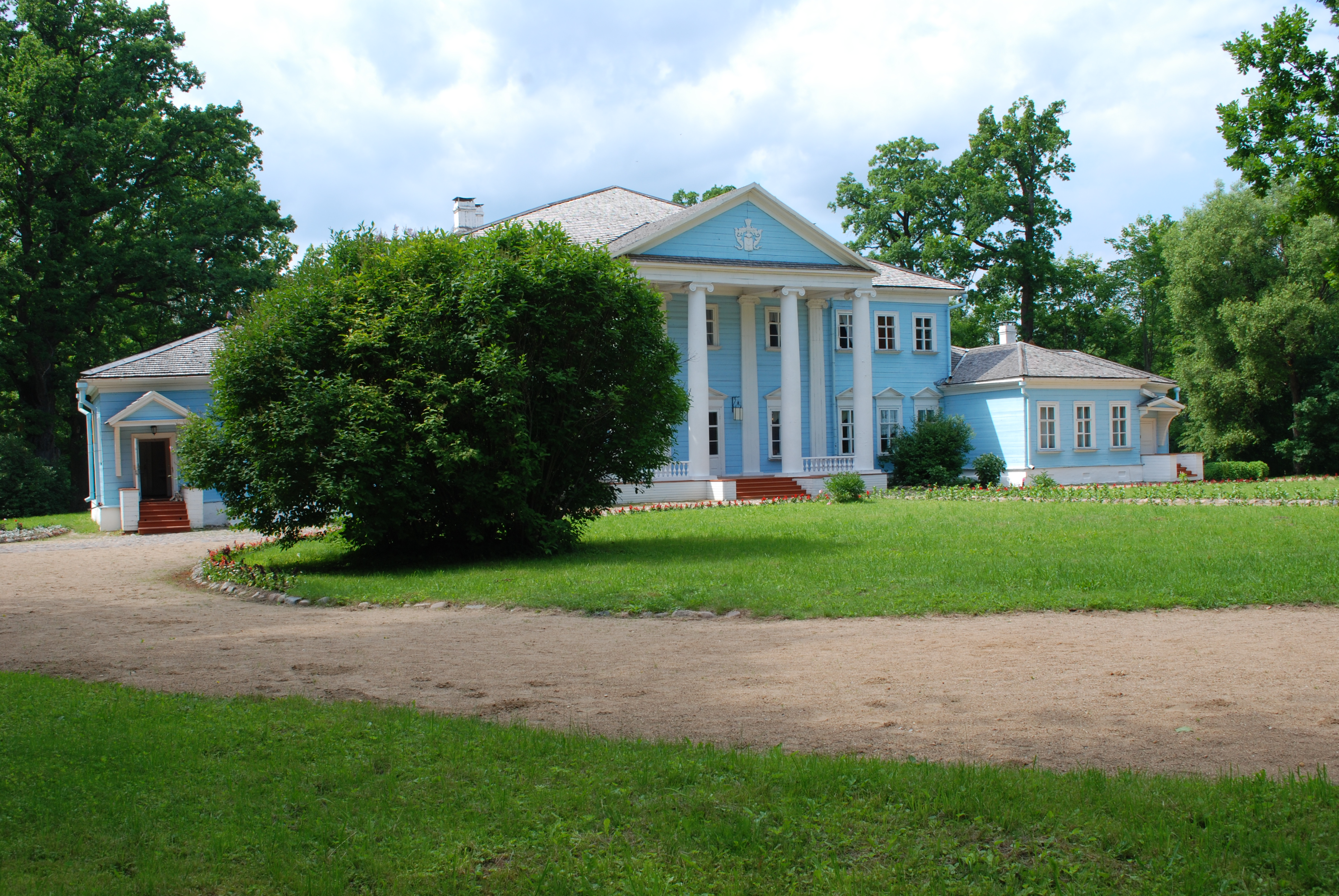
The main house of the Glinka Estate, Novospasskoye

There is a local museum in Yelnya. In the selo of Novospasskoye, in the estate where the composer Mikhail Glinka was born, there is a memorial museum.
