= Glinka, Smolensk Oblast =

Glinka Глинка
- Settlement
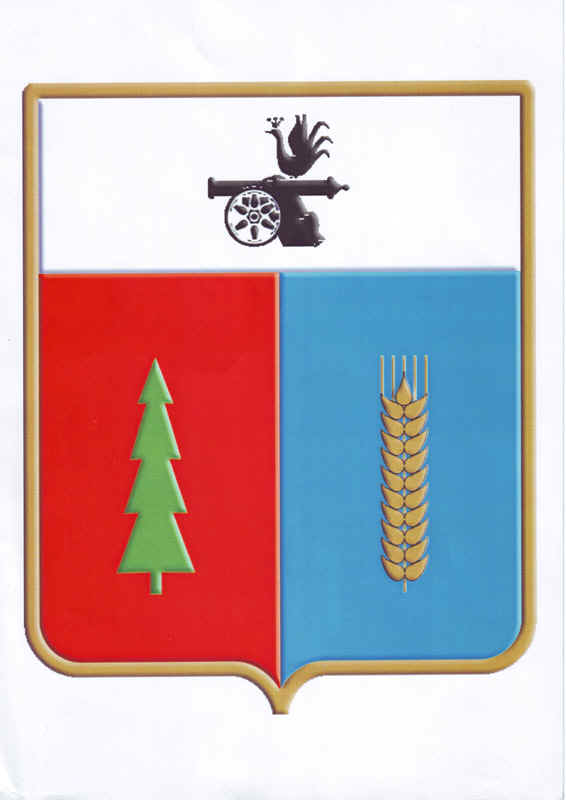
- Coat of arms
- Interactive map of Glinka
- Location of Glinka Glinka (Smolensk Oblast)
- Country: Russia
- Federal subject: Smolensk Oblast
- Administrative district: Glinkovsky District
- Selsoviet: Glinkovsky Selsoviet
- Founded: 1898

Population (2010 Census)
  - Total: 1,942

Administrative status
  - Capital of: Glinkovsky District, Glinkovsky Selsoviet

Municipal status
  - Municipal district: Glinkovsky Municipal District
  - Rural settlement: Glinkovskoye Rural Settlement
  - Capital of: Glinkovsky Municipal District
- Time zone: UTC+3 (MSK)
- Postal code: 216320
- OKTMO ID: 66609411101

Glinka (Russian: Глинка) is a rural locality (a selo) and the administrative center of Glinkovsky District of Smolensk Oblast, Russia. Population: 1,942 (2010 census); 2,017 (2002 census); 2,283 (1989 Soviet census).

== History ==
Glinka was founded in 1898 as a settlement serving Sovkino railway station and was renamed, together with the station, in 1907 to commemorate the composer Mikhail Glinka who was born in the selo of Novospasskoye close by. It belonged to Yelninsky Uyezd of Smolensk Governorate. In October 1928, Yelninsky Uyezd was abolished and split between Smolensky, Roslavlsky, and Vyazemsky Uyezds.

On 12 July 1929, governorates and uyezds were abolished, and Glinkovsky District with the administrative center in Glinka was established. The district belonged to Smolensk Okrug of Western Oblast. On August 1, 1930, the okrugs were abolished, and the districts were subordinated directly to the oblast. On 27 September 1937 Western Oblast was abolished and split between Oryol and Smolensk Oblasts. Glinkovsky District was transferred to Smolensk Oblast. Between 1941 and 1943, during WWII, Glinka was occupied by German troops. On 21 August 1961, Glinkovsky District was merged into Yelninsky District, but on 20 October 1980 it was re-established.

== Climate ==
Glinka has a warm-summer humid continental climate (Dfb in the Köppen climate classification).

Climate data for Glinka
Month	Jan	Feb	Mar	Apr	May	Jun	Jul	Aug	Sep	Oct	Nov	Dec	Year
Mean daily maximum °C (°F)	−4.7 (23.5)	−3.8 (25.2)	1.7 (35.1)	10.8 (51.4)	17.3 (63.1)	20.4 (68.7)	23 (73)	21.6 (70.9)	15.9 (60.6)	8.6 (47.5)	2.3 (36.1)	−1.8 (28.8)	9.3 (48.7)
Daily mean °C (°F)	−6.7 (19.9)	−6.3 (20.7)	−1.6 (29.1)	6.3 (43.3)	13 (55)	16.5 (61.7)	19.1 (66.4)	17.7 (63.9)	12.2 (54.0)	5.9 (42.6)	0.5 (32.9)	−3.6 (25.5)	6.1 (42.9)
Mean daily minimum °C (°F)	−9.2 (15.4)	−9.2 (15.4)	−5.4 (22.3)	1.1 (34.0)	7.7 (45.9)	11.6 (52.9)	14.5 (58.1)	13.3 (55.9)	8.4 (47.1)	3.2 (37.8)	−1.4 (29.5)	−5.7 (21.7)	2.4 (36.3)
Average precipitation mm (inches)	53 (2.1)	46 (1.8)	45 (1.8)	46 (1.8)	75 (3.0)	84 (3.3)	92 (3.6)	81 (3.2)	65 (2.6)	70 (2.8)	55 (2.2)	50 (2.0)	762 (30.2)
Source: https://en.climate-data.org/asia/russian-federation/smolensk-oblast/glinka-49145/

== Economy ==
=== Industry ===
There are no large-scale industrial enterprises in the district. There are plans to build a cement plant and to develop timber industry.

=== Transportation ===
The railway connecting Smolensk and Sukhinichi via Spas-Demensk passes through Glinka. There is infrequent passenger navigation.

Glinka has connections to roads connecting Yelnya and Pochinok, as well as Yelnya and Safonovo (with further access to the M1 highway connecting Moscow and Smolensk).
