= Roslavlsky District =

Roslavlsky District Рославльский район (Russian)
- District
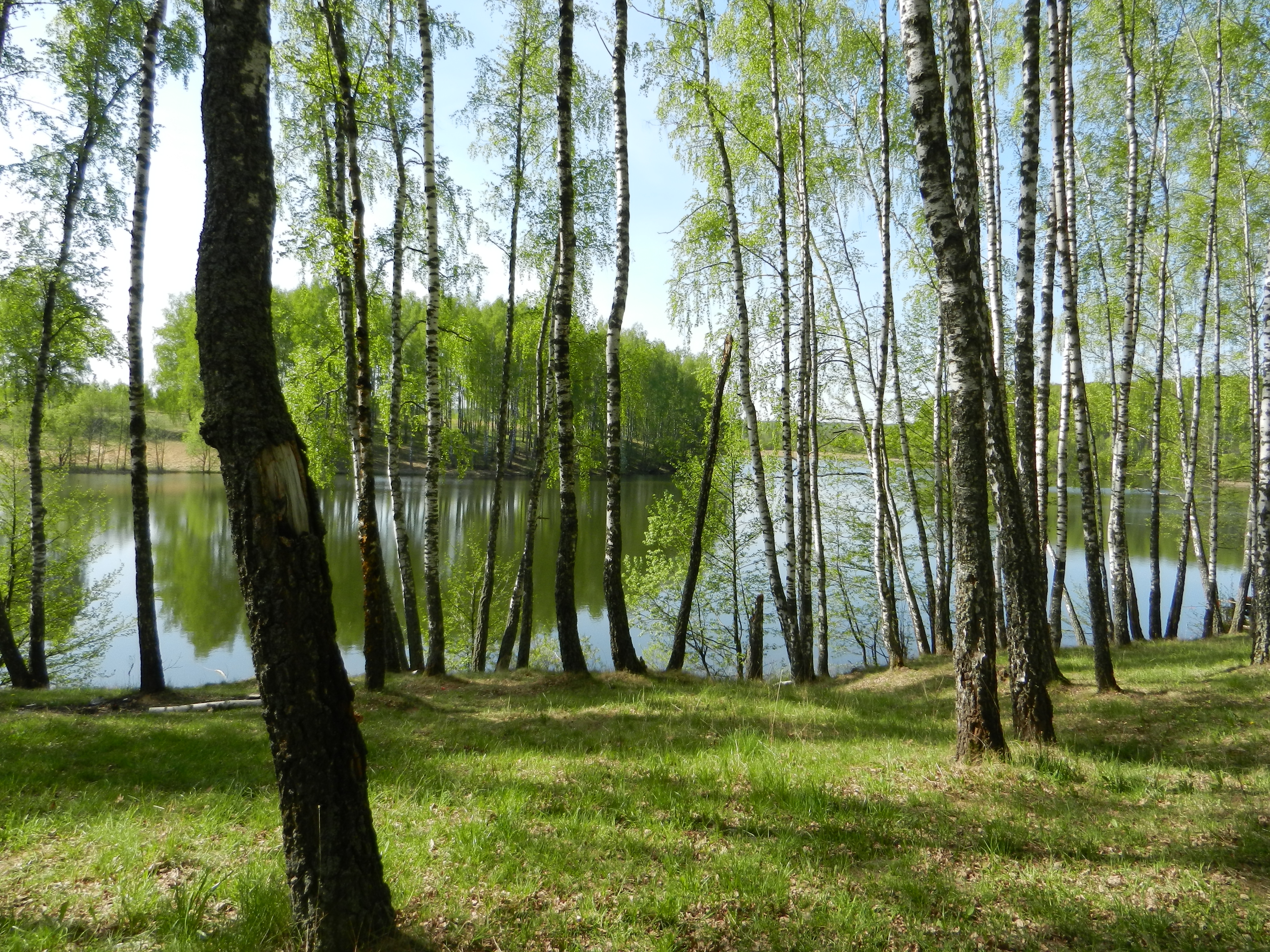
- Birch grove near Vyahori, Roslavsky District

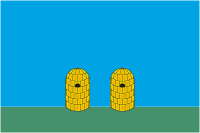
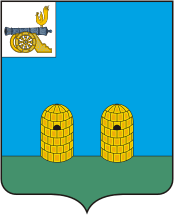
- Flag Coat of arms
- Location of Roslavlsky District in Smolensk Oblast
- Coordinates: 53°57′N 32°52′E
- Country: Russia
- Federal subject: Smolensk Oblast
- Established: 1929
- Administrative center: Roslavl

Area
  - Total: 3,000 km^{2} (1,200 sq mi)

Population (2010 Census)
  - Total: 76,100
  - Density: 25/km^{2} (66/sq mi)
  - Urban: 72.1%
  - Rural: 27.9%

Administrative structure
  - Administrative divisions: 1 Urban settlements, 21 Rural settlements
  - Inhabited localities: 1 cities/towns, 304 rural localities

Municipal structure
  - Municipally incorporated as: Roslavlsky Municipal District
  - Municipal divisions: 1 urban settlements, 21 rural settlements
- Time zone: UTC+3 (MSK)
- OKTMO ID: 66636000
- Website: http://www.roslavl.ru/

Roslavlsky District (Russian: Рославльский район) is an administrative and municipal district (raion), one of the twenty-five in Smolensk Oblast, Russia. It is located in the south of the oblast and borders with Yelninsky District in the north, Spas-Demensky District, of Kaluga Oblast, in the northeast, Kuybyshevsky District, also of Kaluga Oblast, in the east, Rognedinsky District of Bryansk Oblast in the southeast, Dubrovsky District, also of Bryansk Oblast, in the south, Yershichsky District in the southwest, Shumyachsky District in the west, and with Pochinkovsky District in the northwest. The territory of the town of Desnogorsk is enclosed from all sides by Roslavlsky District. The area of the district is 3,000 square kilometers (1,200 sq mi). Its administrative center is the town of Roslavl. Population: 76,100 (2010 Census); 81,307 (2002 census); 61,000 (1989 Soviet census). The population of Roslavl accounts for 72.1% of the district's total population.

== Geography ==
The district is located on the Smolensk Upland. The whole area of the district belongs to the drainage basin of the Dnieper. The Desna River, a major left tributary of the Dnieper, crosses the northern part of the district. A stretch of the Desna makes the border between Smolensk and Kaluga Oblasts. In Desnogorsk, a dam is built on the Desna, and Desnogorsk Reservoir is shared between the city of Desnogorsk, Roslavlsky, Pochinkovsky, and Yelninsky Districts. The rivers in the southwestern part of the district drain into the Ostyor River and the Iput River, tributaries of the Sozh River. The Ostyor itself has its source in the district.

== History ==
Roslavl was founded as Rostislavl in the 1130s or 1140s. The name is likely due to Prince Rostislav of Smolensk, who was the founder of the fortress. At the time of foundation, it belonged to the Principality of Smolensk. The area belonged intermittently to the Principality of Smolensk and the Grand Duchy of Lithuania. In 1376, Roslavl was transferred to Lithuania and became the center of a principality. In 1515, it was conquered by the Grand Duchy of Moscow, but in 1618 transferred to Poland. In 1667, according to the Truce of Andrusovo, Roslavl was transferred back to Russia. During all this period, it was a fortress at the border, and the fortifications were extensively used. The last time they were in use in 1706, during the Great Northern War. In the course of the administrative reform carried out in 1708 by Peter the Great, the area was included into Smolensk Governorate and remained there until 1929, with the exception of the brief periods between 1713 and 1726, when it belonged to Riga Governorate, and between 1775 and 1796, when Smolensk Governorate was transformed into Smolensk Viceroyalty. It belonged to Roslavlsky Uyezd, with the center in Roslavl.

On 12 July 1929, governorates and uyezds were abolished, and Roslavlsky District with the administrative center in Roslavl was established. The district belonged to Roslavl Okrug of Western Oblast, which had its administrative center in Roslavl. On August 1, 1930, the okrugs were abolished, and the districts were subordinated directly to the oblast. On 27 September 1937 Western Oblast was abolished and split between Oryol and Smolensk Oblasts. Roslavlsky District was transferred to Smolensk Oblast. Between 1941 and 1943, during WWII, the district was occupied by German troops.

On 12 July 1929, Stodolishchensky District with the administrative center in the selo of Stodolishche was established on the areas which previously belonged to Roslavlsky and Yelninsky Uyezds of Smolensk Governorate. It belonged to Roslavl Okrug of Western Oblast. In 1937, the raion was transferred to Smolensk Oblast. In 1961 it was abolished and split between Pochinkovsky and Roslavlsky District.

On 12 July 1929, Yekimovichsky District with the administrative center in the selo of Yekimovichi was established as well on the areas which previously belonged to Roslavlsky and Yelninsky Uyezds of Smolensk Governorate, as well as Mosalsky Uyezd of Kaluga Governorate. It belonged to Roslavl Okrug of Western Oblast. In 1937, the raion was transferred to Smolensk Oblast. In 1961 it was abolished and merged into Roslavlsky District.

Another district established on 12 July 1929 was Pavlinovsky District with the administrative center in the settlement at Pavlinovo railway station. It belonged to Sukhinichi Okrug of Western Oblast. In 1932, the raion was abolished and split between Dorogobuzhsky, Spas-Demensky, Yekimovichsky, and Yalninsky Districts.

== Economy ==
=== Industry ===
There are enterprises producing parts for trucks, electrical equipment, and ceramics, as well as food, all of them in Roslavl.

=== Agriculture ===
The main agricultural specializations of the district are cattle breeding with meat and milk production, as well as growing of crops and potatoes, and fish farming.

=== Transportation ===
A railway connecting Smolensk and Bryansk crosses the district from north to south. Roslavl I is the principal station within the district. In Roslavl, a railway to Kirov (Fayansovaya railway station), branches off east, however, this line has no passenger traffic. Another railway line, from Roslavl across the border with Belarus to Krychaw, is defunct, since traffic across the border has been halted.

The Russian route A130, formerly A101, connecting Moscow with the border of Belarus and continuing to Babruysk, crosses the district from northeast to southwest and passes through Roslavl. Another road, R120 (formerly A141), which connects Smolensk with Bryansk and Oryol, crosses the district from the northwest to southeast, also passing through Roslavl. There is a road between Roslavl and Yelnya, as well as local roads with bus traffic originating from Roslavl.

Rivers in the district are not navigable.

== Culture and recreation ==
There is a local museum in Roslavl, exhibiting archeological, ethnographic, and art collections.
