= Yelninsky =

Yelninsky (masculine), Yelninskaya (feminine), or Yelninskoye (neuter) may refer to:

- Yelninsky District, a district of Smolensk Oblast, Russia
- Yelninskoye Urban Settlement, an administrative division and a municipal formation which the town of Yelnya and ten rural localities in Yelninsky District of Smolensk Oblast, Russia are incorporated as
- Yelninskoye (rural locality), a rural locality (a village) in Cherepovetsky District of Vologda Oblast, Russia
