= Ostyor =

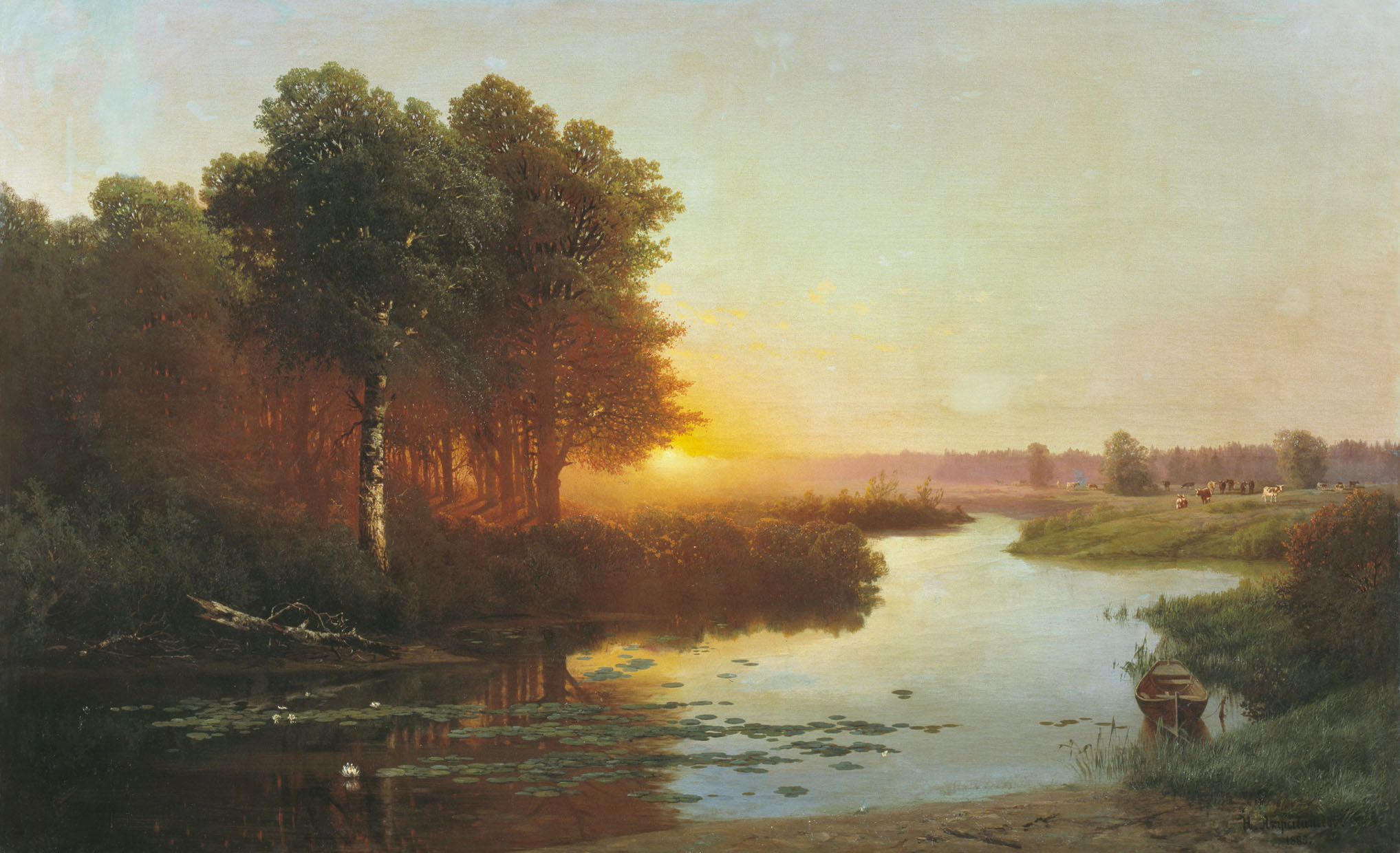
- Ostyor River (1885), painting by Nikolay Atryganev
- Native name: Остёр (Russian)

Location
- Country: Russia, Belarus

Physical characteristics
- Mouth: Sozh
  - coordinates: 53°47′49″N 31°45′38″E
- Length: 274 km (170 mi)
- Basin size: 3,490 km^{2} (1,350 sq mi)
- Discharge
  - average: 20.8 m^{3}/s (730 cu ft/s)

Basin features
- Progression: Sozh→ Dnieper→ Dnieper–Bug estuary→ Black Sea

The Ostyor (Russian: Остёр), or Ascior (Belarusian: Асцёр) is a river in Pochinkovsky, Roslavlsky, and Shumyachsky Districts of Smolensk Oblast in Russia and in Klimavichy and Krychaw Districts of Mogilev Region of Belarus. It is a left tributary of the Sozh. The Ostyor is 274 kilometres (170 mi) long, and has a 3,490 square kilometres (1,350 sq mi) basin. The town of Roslavl is located on the left bank of the Ostyor. The lower course of the Ostyor marks the state border between Russia and Belarus.

The source of the Ostyor is in the east of Pochinkovsky District, in the Smolensk Upland. The river flows south, accepts the Ostrik from the right, turns west and passes Roslavl. There, the Ostyor turns northwest. At the border of the district, it turns west, a stretch of the Ostyor makes the border between Roslavlsky and Pochinskovsky Districts. Downstream, it turns south and makes the border between Roslavlsky and Shumyachsky Districts. Close to the village of Samolyubovo it departs from the border, turns west, flows north of the urban-type settlement of Shumyachi, turns southwest and accepts the Nemka from the right. It crosses Shumyachsky District, and at the state border between Russia and Belarus turns west and follows the border. The mouth of the Ostyor is close to the village of Kholmy.

The drainage basin of the Ostyor includes the southern part of Pochinkovsky District, the western part of Roslavlsky District, the central part of Shumyachsky District, minor areas in the east of Khislavichsky District, as well as parts of Klimavichy and Krychaw Districts.
