= Roslavlsky =

Roslavlsky (masculine), Roslavlskaya (feminine), or Roslavlskoye (neuter) may refer to:

- Roslavlsky District, a district of Smolensk Oblast, Russia
- Roslavlskoye Urban Settlement, an administrative division and a municipal formation which the town of Roslavl in Roslavlsky District of Smolensk Oblast, Russia is incorporated as
