= Alexey Muravyov =

Red Army colonel killed in World War II

Alexey Ilyich Muravyov
- Muravyov in the late 1930s
- Born: 28 October 1900; Zhelanya village, Yukhnovsky Uyezd, Smolensk Governorate, Russian Empire
- Died: 25 June 1941 (aged 40) Belorussian SSR, Soviet Union
- Allegiance: Russian SFSR; Soviet Union
- Branch: Red Army
- Service years: 1919–1941
- Rank: Colonel
- Commands: 121st Rifle Division; 108th Rifle Division; 209th Motorized Division
- Conflicts: Russian Civil War; Polish–Soviet War; World War II †
- Awards: Jubilee Medal "XX Years of the Workers' and Peasants' Red Army"

Alexey Ilyich Muravyov (Russian: Алексей Ильич Муравьёв; 28 October 1900 – 25 June 1941) was a Red Army colonel killed in World War II.

Drafted into the Red Army during the Russian Civil War, Muravyov fought on the Eastern Front and in the Polish–Soviet War as a cavalryman, ending the war as a junior commander. He served in command positions with cavalry units between the wars, and had a stint as a staff officer during the early 1930s. In the late 1930s he quickly advanced from regimental to command to temporary commander of two rifle divisions and in 1941 became commander of the 209th Motorized Division in Belarus. Muravyov's division saw comparatively little action in the opening days of Operation Barbarossa, but despite this he was killed in action on the third day of the war.

== Early life and Russian Civil War ==
Muravyov was born on 28 October 1900 in the village of Zhelanya in the Yukhnovsky Uyezd of Smolensk Governorate (now Ugransky District of Smolensk Oblast). Drafted into the Red Army in March 1919 at Moscow during the Russian Civil War, Muravyov was sent to the 7th Reserve Infantry Regiment in Kostroma. From May of that year he served with a cavalry battalion of the 5th Army, which was later reorganized into the 55th Cavalry Regiment, as a squad leader, assistant commander and commander of a platoon, and acting regimental adjutant. With the regiment, Muravyov fought on the Eastern Front near Ufa and Yekaterinburg against the forces of Alexander Kolchak between August 1919 and March 1920, and from May 1920 fought in the Polish–Soviet War on the Western Front. In August of that year he was interned in East Prussia when his unit was forced to retreat there after being defeated, and spent the six months in an internment camp. Returning to the Soviet Union in March 1921, Muravyov was sent to the 21st Cavalry Courses, initially in located Gzhatsk and later in Minsk. While at the courses he was sent with a consolidated cadet squadron to fight in the suppression of the East Karelian uprising in February 1922.

== Interwar period ==
After graduating from the courses in September 1922, Muravyov was sent to the 14th Cavalry Division of the North Caucasus Military District and served as chief of reconnaissance of the 82nd Cavalry Regiment in Khanskaya. Transferred to the 81st Cavalry Regiment of the division at Kelermesskaya in April 1923, he served as regimental chief of reconnaissance and as a squadron commander, and fought in the elimination of anti-Soviet partisans in the Kuban and North Caucasus between December 1922 and December 1924. The regiment became the 57th Cavalry Regiment of the 10th Maykop Cavalry Division in September 1924 and was moved to Ostrogozhsk, where Muravyov served successively as a squadron commander and acting chief of the regimental school. He graduated externally from the Cavalry School in Moscow in 1925 and between October 1927 and August 1928 studied at the staff department of the Vystrel course, after which he became assistant chief of staff and acting chief of staff of the 59th Cavalry Regiment.

Transferred to the 1st Reserve Cavalry Regiment of the Moscow Military District, stationed at Liski, in September 1929, Muravyov became chief of the regimental school and acting regimental chief of staff. He then served on the district staff from August 1931 as assistant chief of the 5th (combat training) department for special tasks for the district Military Council. During this period, Muravyov graduated from 1 and a half years of night school at the Frunze Military Academy in 1933. He became commander of the 63rd Cavalry Regiment of the Special Red Banner Cavalry Division in December 1936 and assistant commander of the 6th Cossack Cavalry Division in August 1938, being promoted to colonel during the later year and awarded his only decoration, the Jubilee Medal "XX Years of the Workers' and Peasants' Red Army". He became commander of the 121st Rifle Division of the Belorussian Special Military District in March 1940, then the 108th Rifle Division in August. In March 1941, Muravyov was appointed commander of the 209th Motorized Division of the 17th Mechanized Corps of the Western Special Military District (the former Belorussian Special Military District).

== World War II ==
When Operation Barbarossa began on 22 June 1941, the division marched to positions 5 kilometers (3.1 mi) northwest of Slonim. It subsequently retreated towards Baranovichi and Minsk. Late in the evening of 25 June, Muravyov wrote in a report that his division had not yet seen action apart from sporadic German air raids which caused few casualties. He reported stopping thousands of troops fleeing from German air attacks, which Muravyov thought were ineffective. Muravyov's personnel file listed him as missing in July 1941, but 209th Division deputy commander Ivan Chalenko stated in his autobiography that Muravyov was killed in action on 25 June. Ivan Stadnyuk, then a political officer with the division, wrote in postwar memoirs that he had seen Muravyov severely wounded by a German saboteur on 25 or 26 June in the area of Mir.
