= Nikolay Bogdanov-Belsky =

Russian painter

- Николай Богданов-Бельский
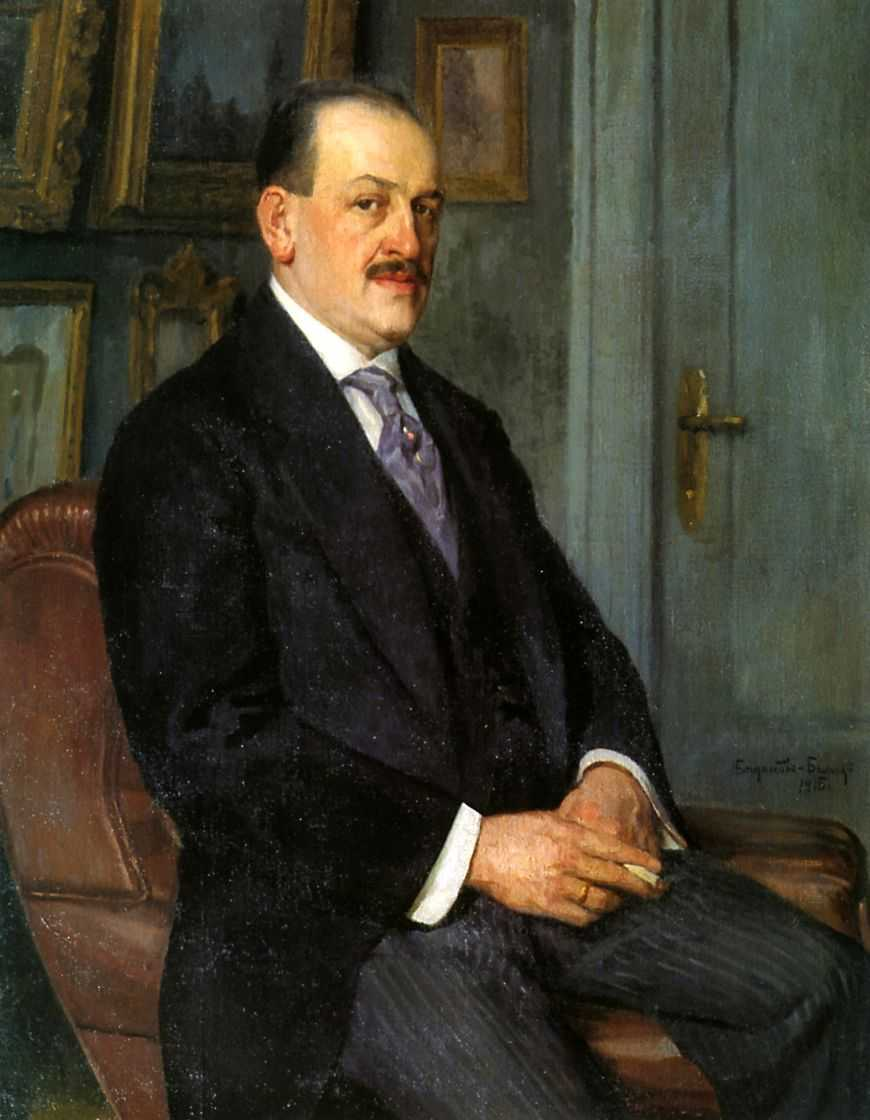
- Self-Portrait, 1915, oils; Art Museum, Luhansk
- Born: Nikolay Petrovich Bogdanov; 20 December [O.S. 8 December] 1868; Shitiki, Belsky Uyezd, Smolensk Governorate
- Died: 19 February 1945 (aged 76); Berlin
- Resting place: Tegel Cemetery, Berlin
- Education: Member Academy of Arts (1903); Full Member Academy of Arts (1914)
- Alma mater: Higher Art School (1899)
- Known for: Painting
- Movement: Peredvizhniki

Nikolay Petrovich Bogdanov-Belsky (Russian: Николай Петрович Богданов-Бельский; 20 December [O.S. 8 December] 1868 – 19 February 1945) was a Russian painter, active in St. Petersburg during Tsars Alexander III and Nicholas II's reigns and then in Riga during the Interwar era, best known for his genre pictures of peasants.

== Life ==
Bogdanov was born in the village of Shitiki in Smolensk Governorate in 1868, then he added to his surname "Belsky" in accordance with the name of the Uyezd where he was born. He studied at the elementary school where his teacher was Sergey Rachinsky, then studied icon-painting at the Troitse-Sergiyeva Lavra in 1883, modern painting at the Moscow School of Painting, Sculpture and Architecture in 1884 to 1889, and at the Imperial Academy of Arts in St. Petersburg from 1894 to 1895. He worked and studied in private studios in Paris in the late 1890s.

Bogdanov-Belsky was active in St. Petersburg. He became a member of several prominent societies in including the Peredvizhniki from 1895, and the Kuindzhi Society from 1909 (of which he was a founding member and chairman from 1913 to 1918).

Bogdanov-Belsky painted mostly genre paintings, especially of the education of peasant children, portraits, and impressionistic landscapes studies. He became pedagogue and academician in 1903. He was an active Member of the Academy of Arts in 1914. Strongly disdaining the Bolsheviks' rise to power in 1917, Bogdanov emigrated to Riga in 1921. Due to illness, he was taken to a Berlin clinic and was killed on February 19, 1945 as a result of Allied bombing. He was buried at the Berlin-Tegel Russian Orthodox Cemetery.

He was a member of the Russian Fraternitas Arctica in Riga.

== Selected paintings ==
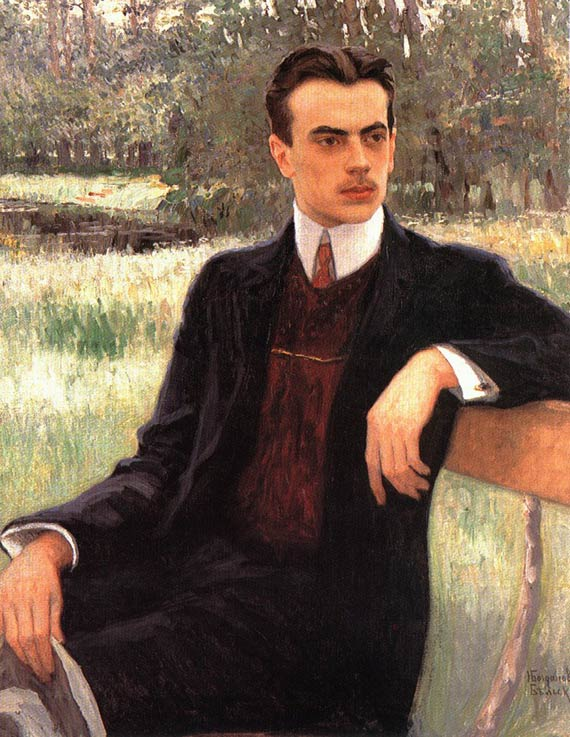
Prince Nicholas Yusupov, 1911

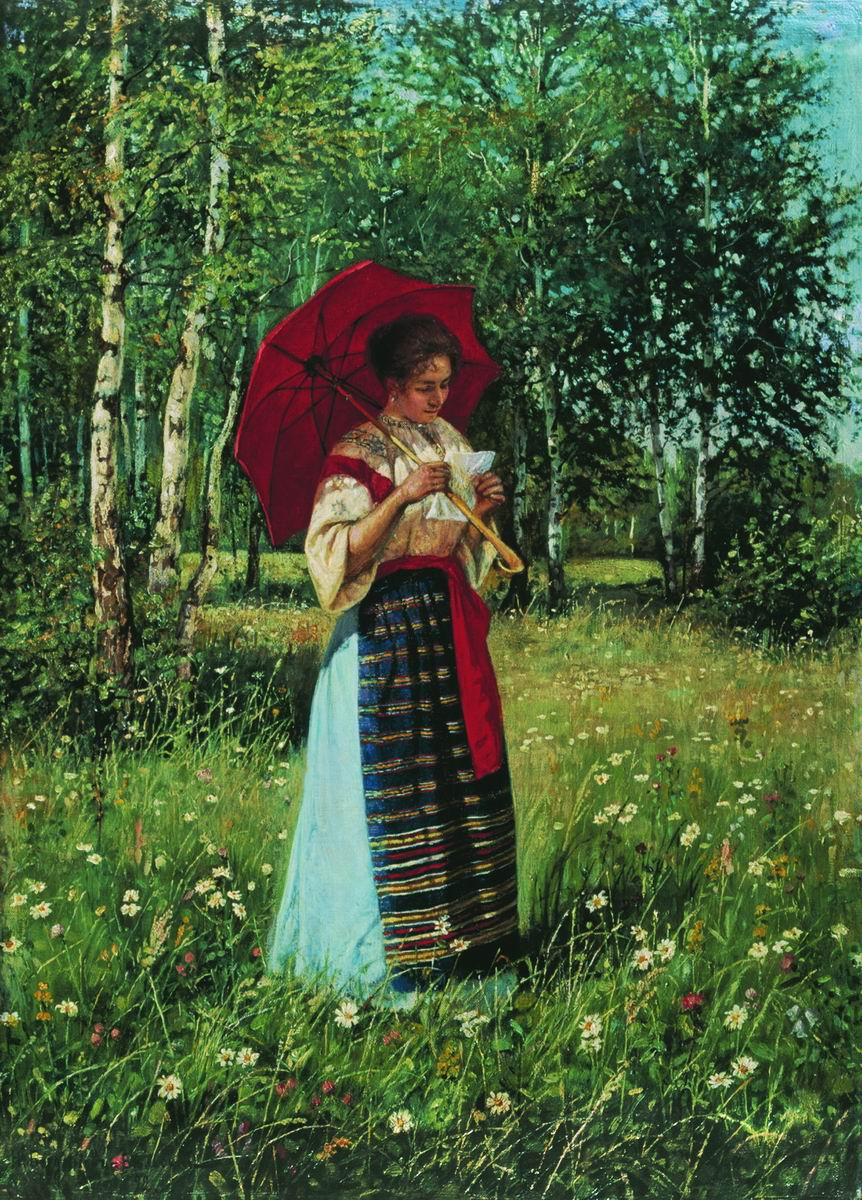
Reading a Letter, 1892

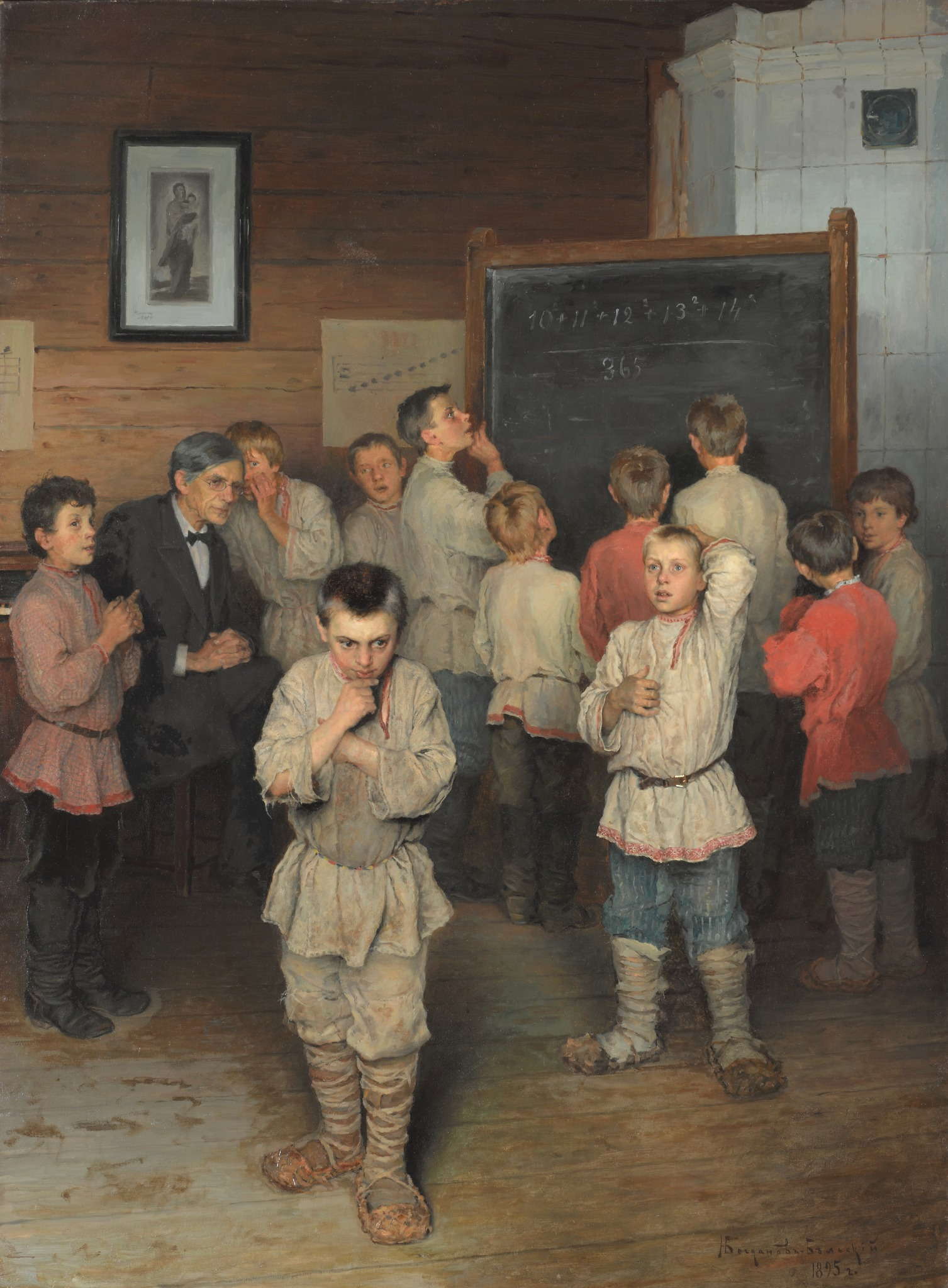
Mental Arithmetic, in the Rachinsky School, 1895

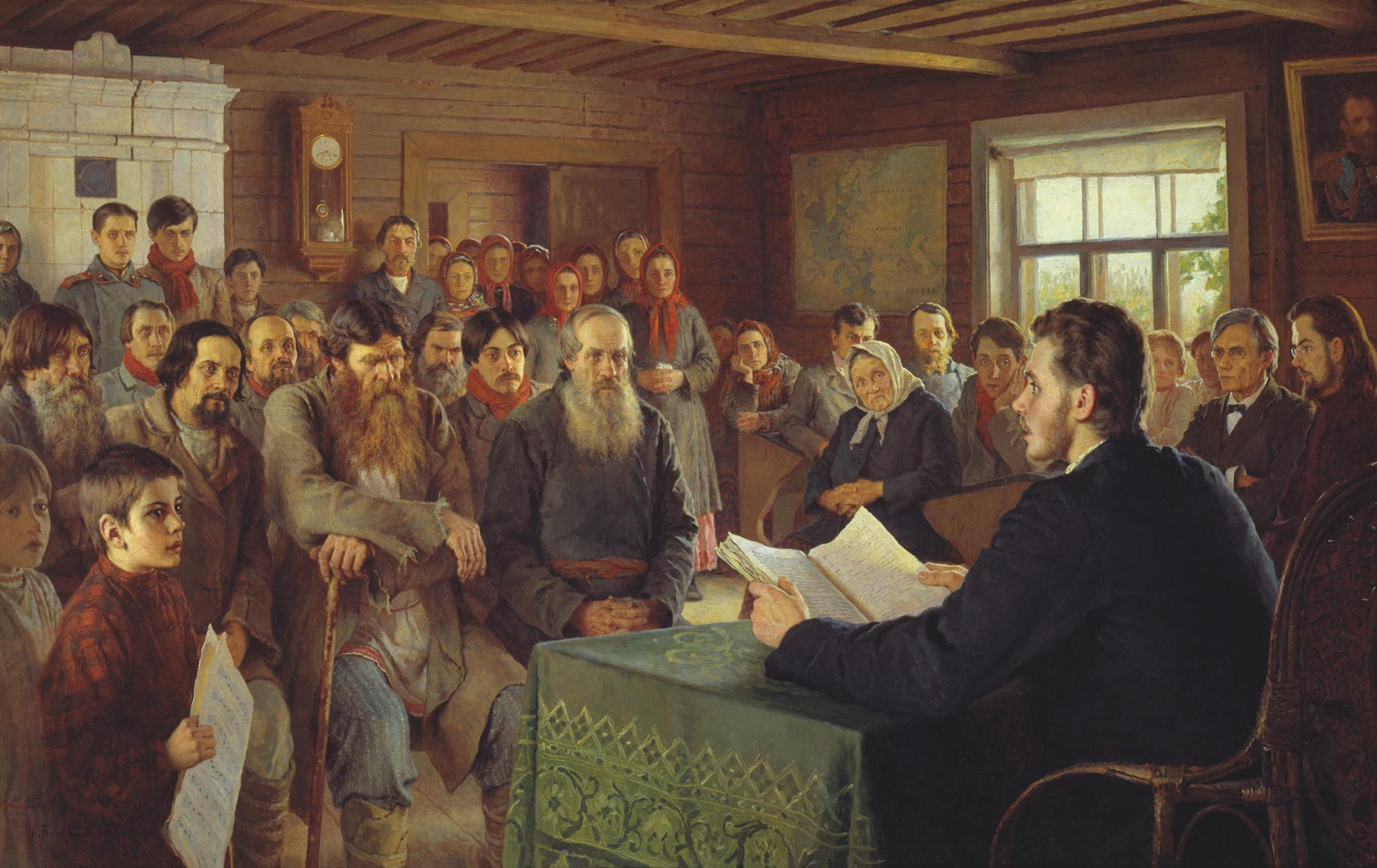
Sunday reading in a village school, 1895

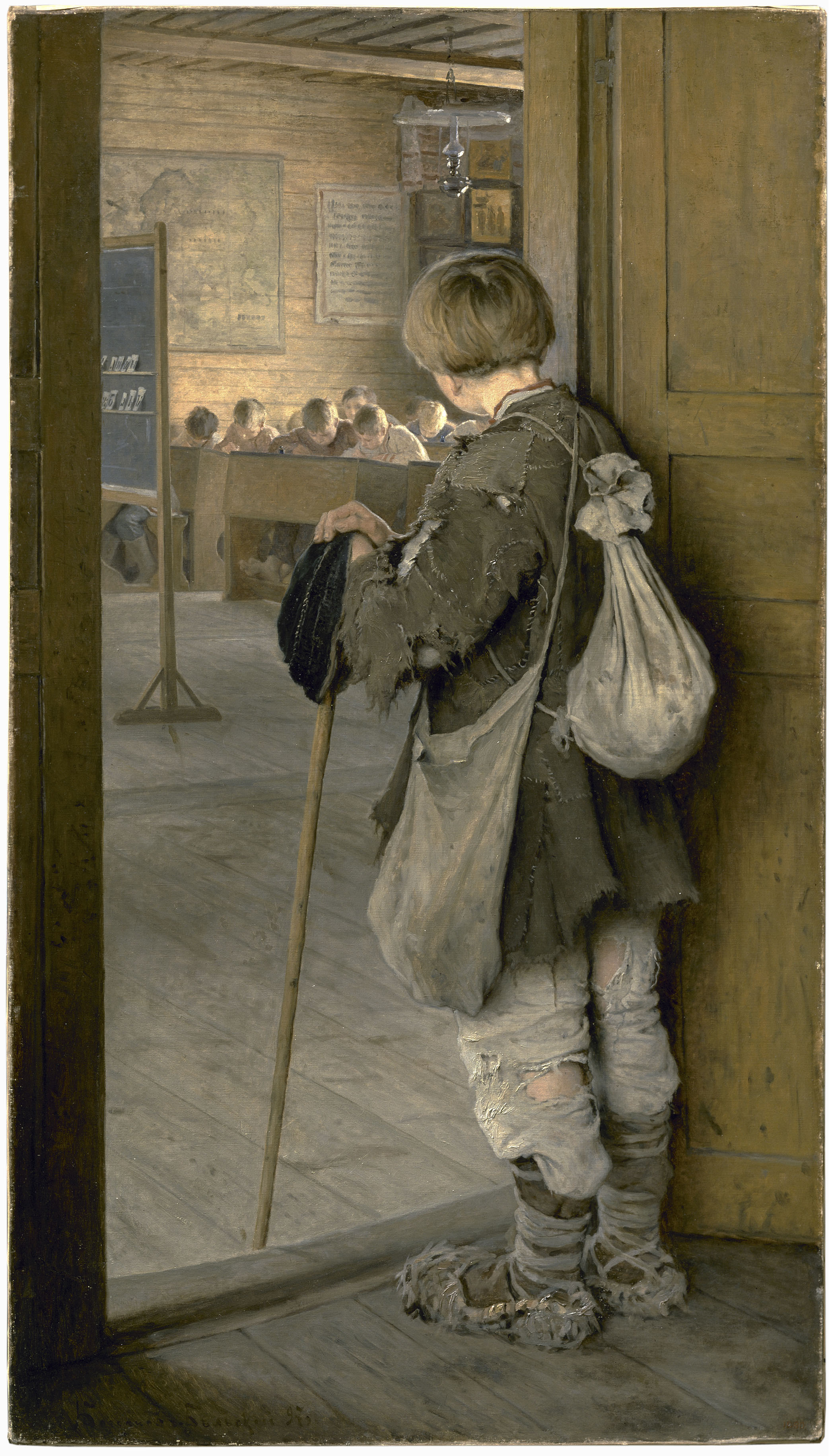
At the School Doors, 1897

== See also ==
- List of Russian artists
