= Dorogobuzhsky Uyezd =

Dorogobuzhsky Uyezd (Дорогобужский уезд) was one of the subdivisions of the Smolensk Governorate of the Russian Empire. It was situated in the central part of the governorate. Its administrative centre was Dorogobuzh.

== Demographics ==
At the time of the Russian Empire Census of 1897, Dorogobuzhsky Uyezd had a population of 104,730. Of these, 99.4% spoke Russian, 0.2% Yiddish, 0.1% Latvian, 0.1% Polish and 0.1% German as their native language.
