= Gzhatsky Uyezd =

Gzhatsky Uyezd (Гжатский уезд) was one of the subdivisions of the Smolensk Governorate of the Russian Empire. It was situated in the northeastern part of the governorate. Its administrative centre was Gzhatsk (Gagarin).

== Demographics ==
At the time of the Russian Empire Census of 1897, Ghatsky Uyezd had a population of 98,266. Of these, 99.2% spoke Russian, 0.2% Polish, 0.2% Yiddish, 0.1% Ukrainian, 0.1% Belarusian, 0.1% Latvian and 0.1% German as their native language.
