= Krasninsky Uyezd =

Krasninsky Uyezd (Russian: Краснинский уезд; Belarusian: Краснінскі павет, romanized: Krasninski paviet) was one of the subdivisions of the Smolensk Governorate of the Russian Empire. It was situated in the southwestern part of the governorate. Its administrative centre was Krasny.

== Demographics ==
At the time of the Russian Empire Census of 1897, Krasninsky Uyezd had a population of 102,257. Of these, 90.0% spoke Belarusian, 8.7% Russian, 0.7% Yiddish, 0.4% Polish, 0.1% Romani and 0.1% German as their native language.
