= Yelnya, Yelninsky District, Smolensk Oblast =

Town in Smolensk Oblast, Russia

Yelnya Ельня
- Town
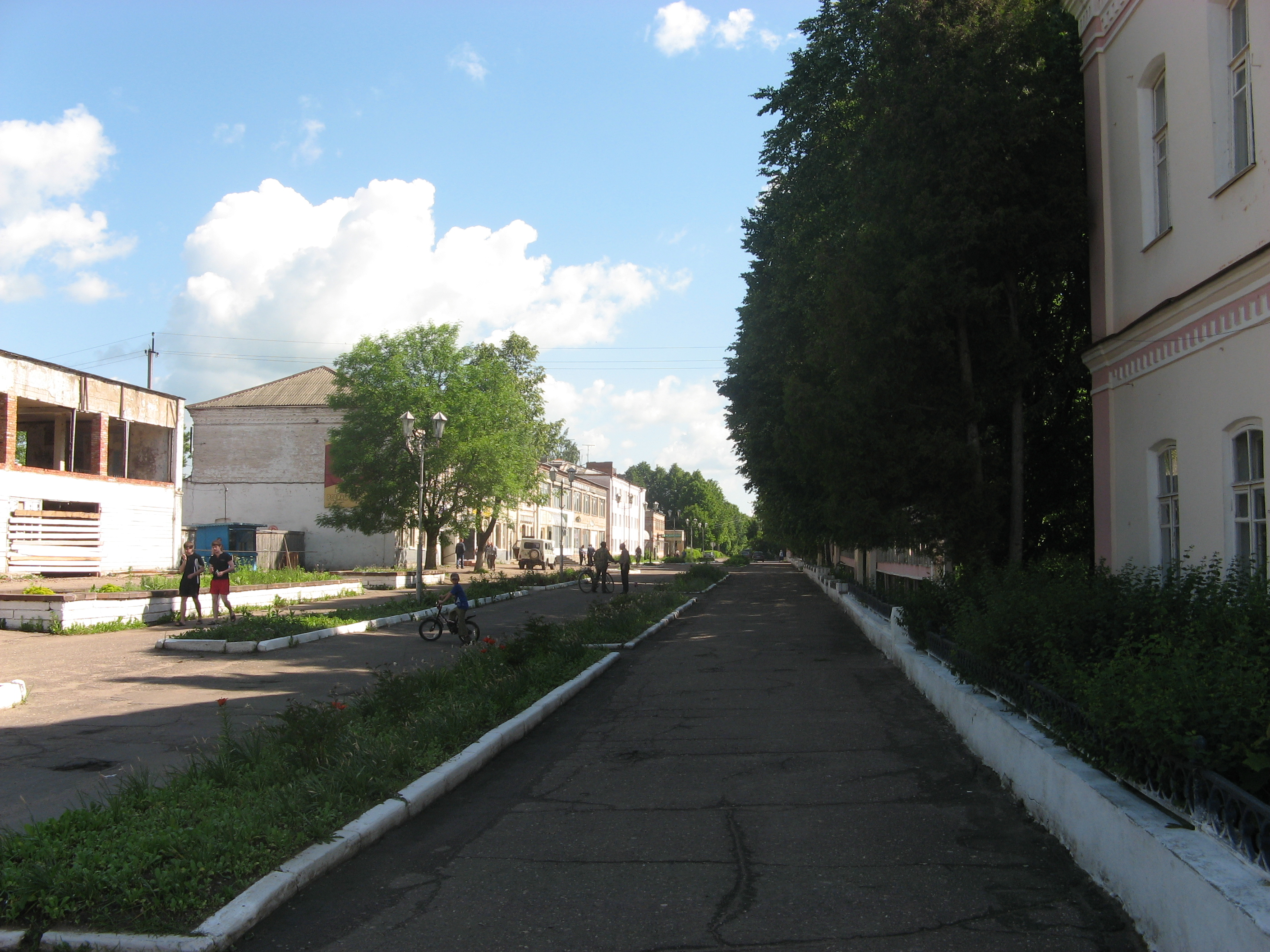
- A street in Yelnya

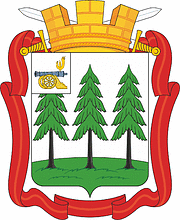
- Flag Coat of arms
- Interactive map of Yelnya
- Location of Yelnya Yelnya (Smolensk Oblast)
- Coordinates: 54°35′N 33°11′E
- Country: Russia
- Federal subject: Smolensk Oblast
- Administrative district: Yelninsky District
- Urban settlementSelsoviet: Yelninskoye
- First mentioned: 1150
- Town status since: 1776

Area
  - Total: 97.94 km^{2} (37.81 sq mi)
- Elevation: 230 m (750 ft)

Population (2010 Census)
  - Total: 10,095
  - Estimate (2025): 7,748 (−23.2%)
  - Density: 103.1/km^{2} (267.0/sq mi)

Administrative status
  - Capital of: Yelninsky District, Yelninskoye Urban Settlement

Municipal status
  - Municipal district: Yelninsky Municipal District
  - Urban settlement: Yelninskoye Urban Settlement
  - Capital of: Yelninsky Municipal District, Yelninskoye Urban Settlement
- Time zone: UTC+3 (MSK)
- Postal code: 216330
- Dialing code: +7 48146
- OKTMO ID: 66619101001

Yelnya (Russian: Е́льня) is a town and the administrative center of Yelninsky District in Smolensk Oblast, Russia, located on the Desna River, 82 kilometers (51 mi) from Smolensk, the administrative center of the oblast. The population was 10,095 (2010 census); 10,798 (2002 census); 9,868 (1989 Soviet census).

== Etymology ==
Yelnya's name is likely related to the Russian word "ель"(yel', lit. fir tree) or "елань" (yelan', lit. land cleared from forest).

== History ==
It was first mentioned in the historical documents in 1150 when according to the order of knyaz Rostislav of Smolensk it was to pay a tax of four grivnas and a fox skin.

The settlement shared the history of the Smolensk lands—it paid duty to the Golden Horde, then was captured by the Grand Duchy of Lithuania and the Polish–Lithuanian Commonwealth. It was returned to Russia with the rest of the Smolensk Voivodeship at the close of the Russo-Polish War of 1654–1667. In 1776, it was granted town status and became the seat of an uyezd.

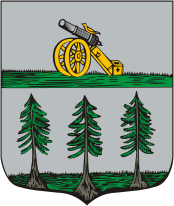
1780 coat of arms of Yelnya

In 1812, during the French invasion of Russia, Yelnya became an important center of the partisan movement. During the counter-offensive campaign, Mikhail Kutuzov's headquarters were located here.

In October 1928, Yelninsky Uyezd was abolished and split between Smolensky, Roslavlsky, and Vyazemsky Uyezds. On 12 July 1929, governorates and uyezds were abolished, and Yelninsky District with the administrative center in Yelnya was established. The district belonged to Smolensk Okrug of Western Oblast. On August 1, 1930, the okrugs were abolished, and the districts were subordinated directly to the oblast. On 27 September 1937 Western Oblast was abolished and split between Oryol and Smolensk Oblasts. Yelninsky District was transferred to Smolensk Oblast.

During World War II, Yelnya was a place of several important battles. On 30 August 1941, it became the place of the Yelnya Offensive, the first successful offensive operation of Soviet troops in the Great Patriotic War, although they suffered heavy losses taking the town. In 1942, Yelninsky District became a part of the so-called "Dorogobuzh Partisan Krai". The German garrison in the town was not able to control the rural territories which were effectively under the partisan control. In March 1942, partisans even liberated the town, killing more than a thousand German troops, but in three days on March 18, 1942 they were forced to retreat to the forests.

A total of 289 Jews used to live in Yelnya in 1939 but in March 1942, 230 Jews were shot by German units in a mass execution.

In August 1943, Yelnya played the key part in the Battle of Smolensk. On August 30, Germans were forced to abandon Yelnya, sustaining heavy casualties. This started a full-scale German retreat from the area. By September 3, Soviet forces reached the eastern shore of the Dnieper.

== Administrative and municipal status ==
Within the framework of administrative divisions, Yelnya serves as the administrative center of Yelninsky District. As an administrative division, it is, together with ten rural localities, incorporated within Yelninsky District as Yelninskoye Urban Settlement. As a municipal division, this administrative unit also has urban settlement status and is a part of Yelninsky Municipal District.

== Economy ==
=== Industry ===
The town has a cheese factory, a large bakery, a brick factory, and a few sawmills.

=== Transportation ===
Yelnya railway station is on the railway connecting Smolensk and Sukhinichi via Spas-Demensk. There is infrequent passenger navigation.

Yelnya is connected by roads with Safonovo (where it has access to the M1 highway connecting Moscow and Smolensk), with Pochinok, and with Roslavl.

== Culture and recreation ==
There is a local museum in Yelnya.

Town of Glory, a German-financed 2019 documentary, by Dmitry Bogolyubov and Anna Shishova-Bogolyubova, filmed over three years, a destitute post-industrial provincial town, economically marginalized since the Soviet Union collapse.
