= Belsky Uyezd (Smolensk Governorate) =

Subdivision of the Smolensk Governorate of the Russian Empire

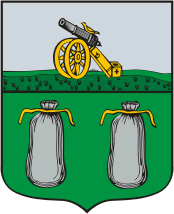

Belsky Uyezd (Бельский уезд) was one of the subdivisions of the Smolensk Governorate of the Russian Empire. It was situated in the northern part of the governorate. Its administrative centre was Bely.

== Demographics ==
At the time of the Russian Empire Census of 1897, Belsky Uyezd had a population of 165,159. Of these, 99.0% spoke Russian, 0.3% Yiddish, 0.3% Latvian, 0.1% German and 0.1% Belarusian as their native language.
