= Yukhnovsky Uyezd =

Yukhnovsky Uyezd (Юхновский уезд) was one of the subdivisions of the Smolensk Governorate of the Russian Empire. It was situated in the northeastern part of the governorate. Its administrative centre was Yukhnov.

== Demographics ==
At the time of the Russian Empire Census of 1897, Yukhnovsky Uyezd had a population of 121,143. Of these, 98.8% spoke Russian, 1.0% Belarusian, 0.1% Yiddish and 0.1% Romani as their native language.
