= Roslavl =

Town in Smolensk Oblast, Russia

Roslavl Рославль
- Town
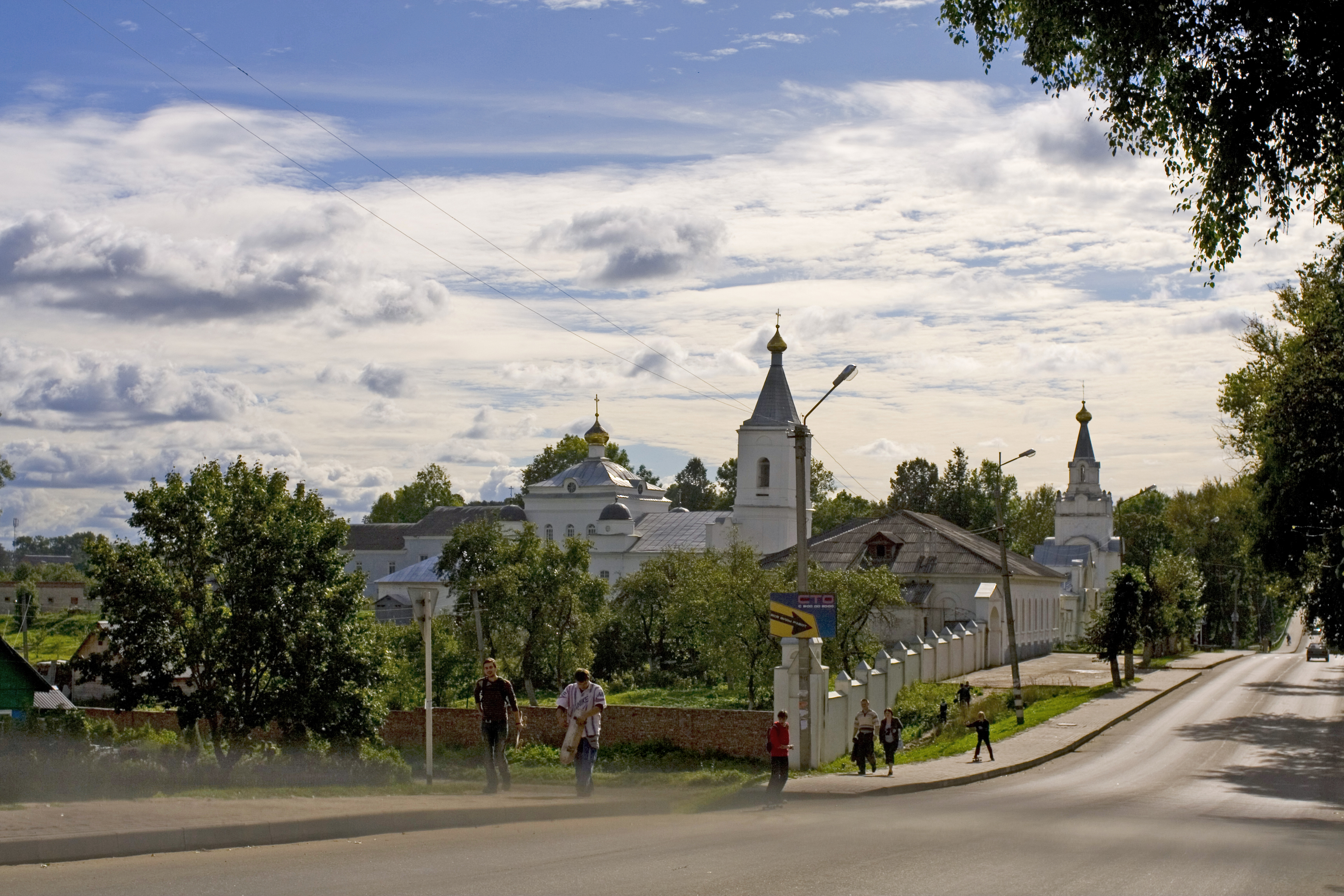
- View of Roslavl

- Flag Coat of arms
- Interactive map of Roslavl
- Location of Roslavl Roslavl (Smolensk Oblast)
- Coordinates: 53°57′N 32°53′E
- Country: Russia
- Federal subject: Smolensk Oblast
- Administrative district: Roslavlsky District
- Urban settlementSelsoviet: Roslavlskoye
- Founded: 1137 (Julian)
- Town status since: 1408
- Elevation: 200 m (660 ft)

Population (2010 Census)
  - Total: 54,900
  - Estimate (2025): 43,208 (−21.3%)

Administrative status
  - Capital of: Roslavlsky District, Roslavlskoye Urban Settlement

Municipal status
  - Municipal district: Roslavlsky Municipal District
  - Urban settlement: Roslavlskoye Urban Settlement
  - Capital of: Roslavlsky Municipal District, Roslavlskoye Urban Settlement
- Time zone: UTC+3 (MSK)
- Postal codes: 216500–216502, 216504–216507, 216509, 216569
- OKTMO ID: 66636101001

Roslavl (Russian: Ро́славль, Russian pronunciation: [ˈrosləvlʲ]) is a town and the administrative center of Roslavlsky District in Smolensk Oblast, Russia. It is a road and rail junction and a market town. Population: 54,900 (2010 census); 57,701 (2002 census); 60,470 (1989 Soviet census).

== History ==
Roslavl was founded as Rostislavl in the 1130s or 1140s. The name is likely due to Prince Rostislav of Smolensk, who was the founder of the fortress. It belonged to the Principality of Smolensk. The area belonged intermittently to the Principality of Smolensk and the Grand Duchy of Lithuania. In 1376, Roslavl was transferred to Lithuania and became the center of a principality. It was chartered under Lithuanian rule in 1408. In 1515, it was conquered by the Grand Duchy of Moscow, but in 1618 transferred to Poland. Under Polish-Lithuanian rule Roslavl was part of the Smolensk Voivodeship. In 1667, according to the Truce of Andrusovo, Roslavl was transferred back to Russia. During all this period, it was a fortress at the border, and the fortifications were extensively used. The last time they were in use in 1706, during the Great Northern War. In the course of the administrative reform carried out in 1708 by Peter the Great, the area was included into Smolensk Governorate and remained there until 1929, with the exception of the brief periods between 1713 and 1726, when it belonged to Riga Governorate, and between 1775 and 1796, when Smolensk Governorate was transformed into Smolensk Viceroyalty. It was the center of Roslavlsky Uyezd.

On 12 July 1929, governorates and uyezds were abolished, and Roslavlsky District with the administrative center in Roslavl was established. The district belonged to Roslavl Okrug of Western Oblast, which had its administrative center in Roslavl. On August 1, 1930, the okrugs were abolished, and the districts were subordinated directly to the oblast. On 27 September 1937 Western Oblast was abolished and split between Oryol and Smolensk Oblasts. Roslavlsky District was transferred to Smolensk Oblast. Between August 3, 1941 to September 25, 1943, during WWII, the district was occupied by German troops.

== Administrative and municipal status ==
Within the framework of administrative divisions, Roslavl serves as the administrative center of Roslavlsky District. As an administrative division, it is incorporated within Roslavlsky District as Roslavlskoye Urban Settlement. As a municipal division, this administrative unit also has urban settlement status and is a part of Roslavlsky Municipal District.

== Economy ==
=== Industry ===
In Roslavl, there are enterprises producing parts for trucks, electrical equipment, and ceramics, as well as food.

=== Transportation ===
A railway connecting Smolensk and Bryansk passes through Roslavl I railway station. Another railway to Kirov (Fayansovaya railway station), branches off east. The line from Roslavl across the border with Belarus to Krychaw is defunct, since traffic across the border has been halted. There is no passenger traffic along the line to Kirov.

The Russian route A130, formerly A101, connecting Moscow with the border of Belarus and continuing to Babruysk, passes through Roslavl. Another road, R120 (formerly A141), which connects Smolensk with Bryansk and Oryol, passes through Roslavl as well. There is a road between Roslavl and Yelnya, as well as local roads with bus traffic originating from Roslavl.

== Geography ==
=== Climate ===
Roslavl has a warm-summer humid continental climate (Dfb in the Köppen climate classification).

Climate data for Roslavl (1991–2020, extremes 1948–present)
Month	Jan	Feb	Mar	Apr	May	Jun	Jul	Aug	Sep	Oct	Nov	Dec	Year
Record high °C (°F)	8.5 (47.3)	9.4 (48.9)	23.1 (73.6)	28.7 (83.7)	31.0 (87.8)	33.3 (91.9)	36.4 (97.5)	37.3 (99.1)	30.0 (86.0)	25.9 (78.6)	15.2 (59.4)	10.1 (50.2)	37.3 (99.1)
Mean daily maximum °C (°F)	−3.3 (26.1)	−2.4 (27.7)	3.2 (37.8)	12.2 (54.0)	18.8 (65.8)	22.0 (71.6)	24.1 (75.4)	23.0 (73.4)	17.1 (62.8)	9.7 (49.5)	2.3 (36.1)	−2.0 (28.4)	10.4 (50.7)
Daily mean °C (°F)	−5.8 (21.6)	−5.4 (22.3)	−0.6 (30.9)	7.1 (44.8)	13.2 (55.8)	16.7 (62.1)	18.6 (65.5)	17.3 (63.1)	11.9 (53.4)	5.8 (42.4)	0.0 (32.0)	−4.2 (24.4)	6.2 (43.2)
Mean daily minimum °C (°F)	−8.3 (17.1)	−8.3 (17.1)	−4.1 (24.6)	2.4 (36.3)	7.8 (46.0)	11.3 (52.3)	13.4 (56.1)	12.1 (53.8)	7.5 (45.5)	2.5 (36.5)	−2.2 (28.0)	−6.4 (20.5)	2.3 (36.1)
Record low °C (°F)	−40.8 (−41.4)	−38.4 (−37.1)	−30.0 (−22.0)	−17.0 (1.4)	−4.9 (23.2)	−2.6 (27.3)	4.7 (40.5)	−0.8 (30.6)	−4.2 (24.4)	−19.6 (−3.3)	−23.3 (−9.9)	−35.2 (−31.4)	−40.8 (−41.4)
Average precipitation mm (inches)	38.2 (1.50)	33.8 (1.33)	36.5 (1.44)	34.6 (1.36)	67.5 (2.66)	82.4 (3.24)	92.0 (3.62)	62.7 (2.47)	56.0 (2.20)	60.6 (2.39)	45.3 (1.78)	40.7 (1.60)	650.3 (25.60)
Average precipitation days (≥ 1.0 mm)	10	9	8	7	9	10	11	8	8	9	9	10	108
Average relative humidity (%)	87	84	75	66	67	72	75	75	79	83	88	89	78
Source 1: NOAA
Source 2: Pogoda.ru.net (extremes)

== Culture and recreation ==
There is a local museum in Roslavl, exhibiting archeological, ethnographic, and art collections.

== Notable people ==
Among the natives of Roslavl were sculptors Mikhail Mikeshin and Sergey Konenkov, film director Ilya Frez, athlete Maria Itkina, as well as some ancestors of Fyodor Tyutchev.

== Gallery ==
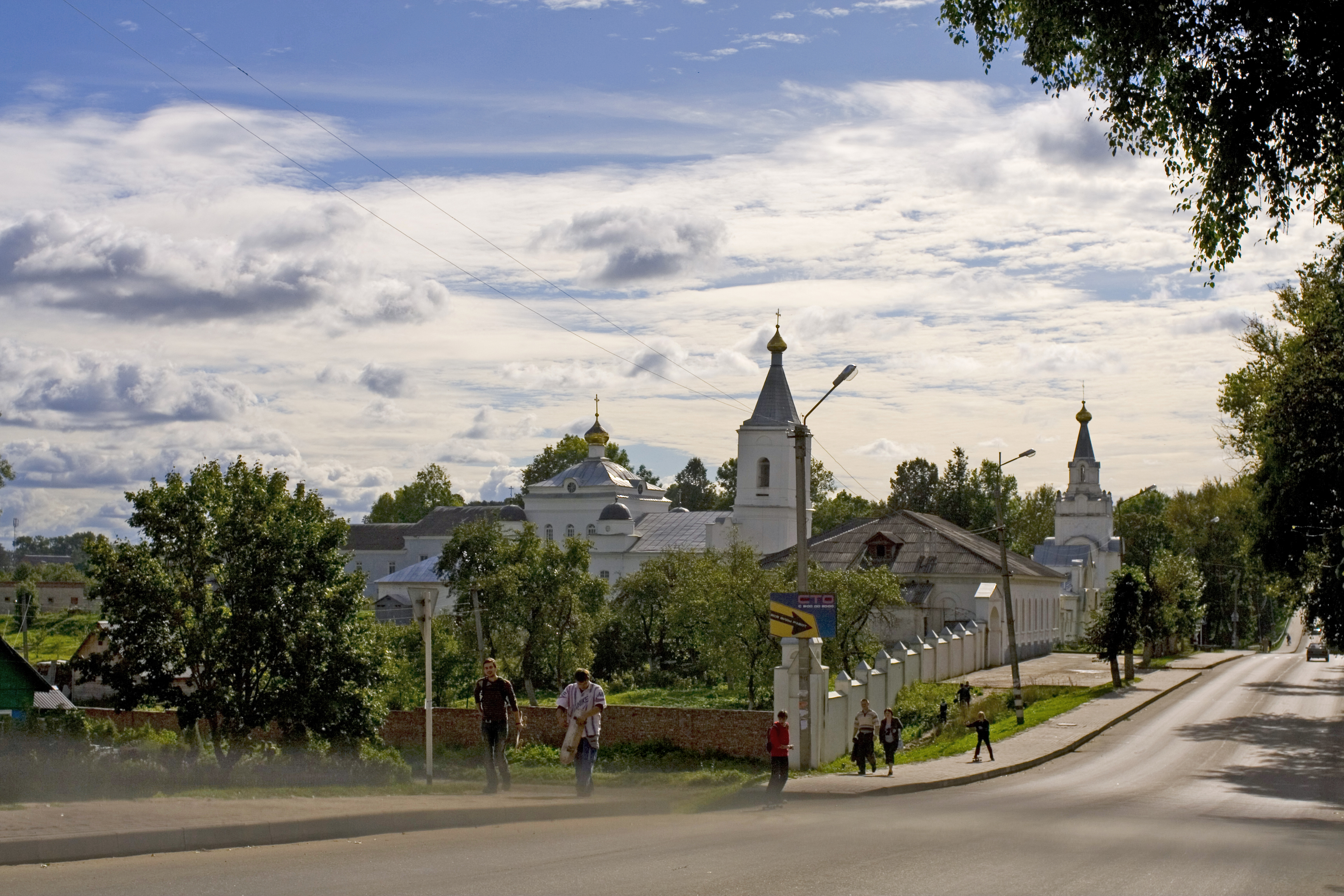

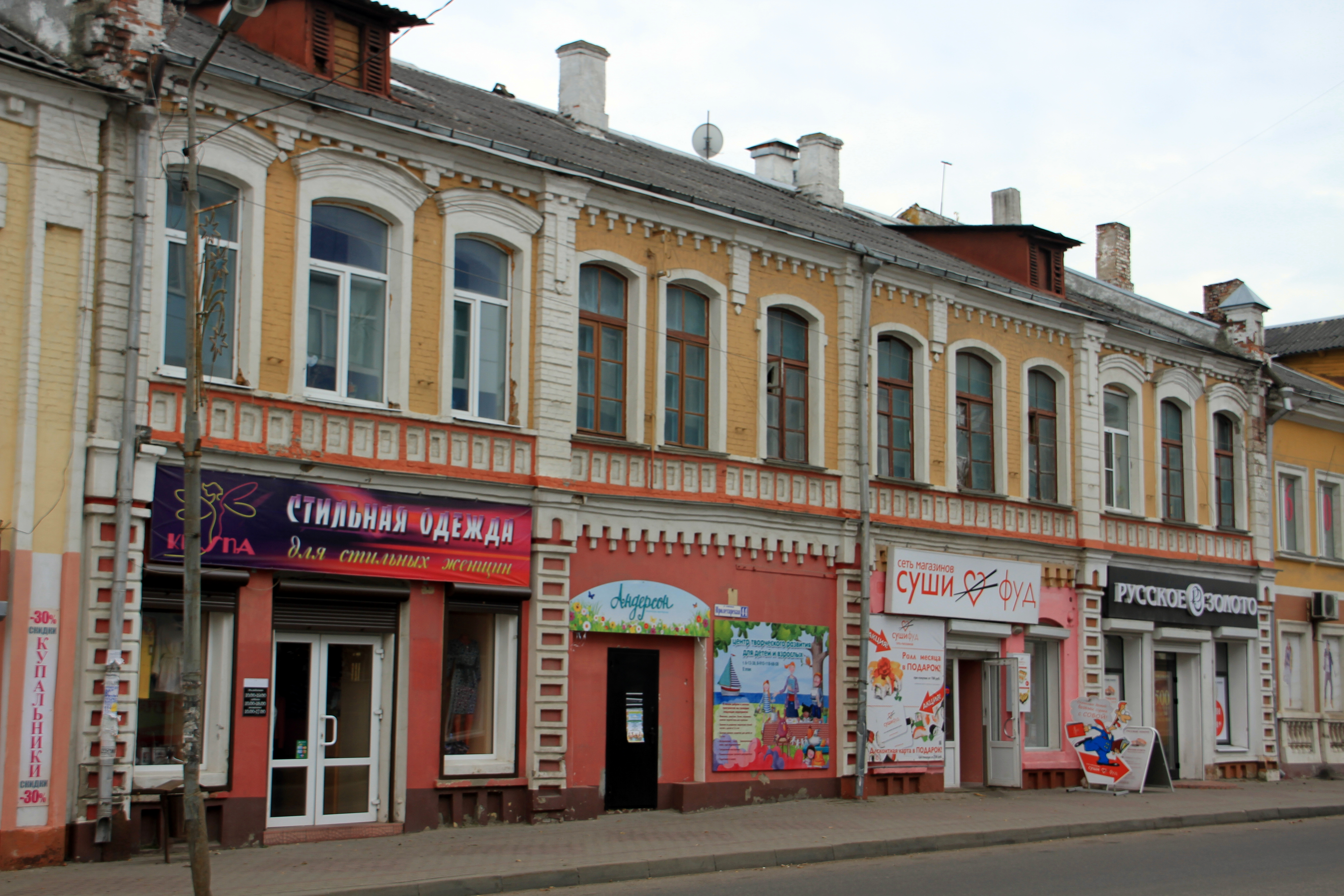

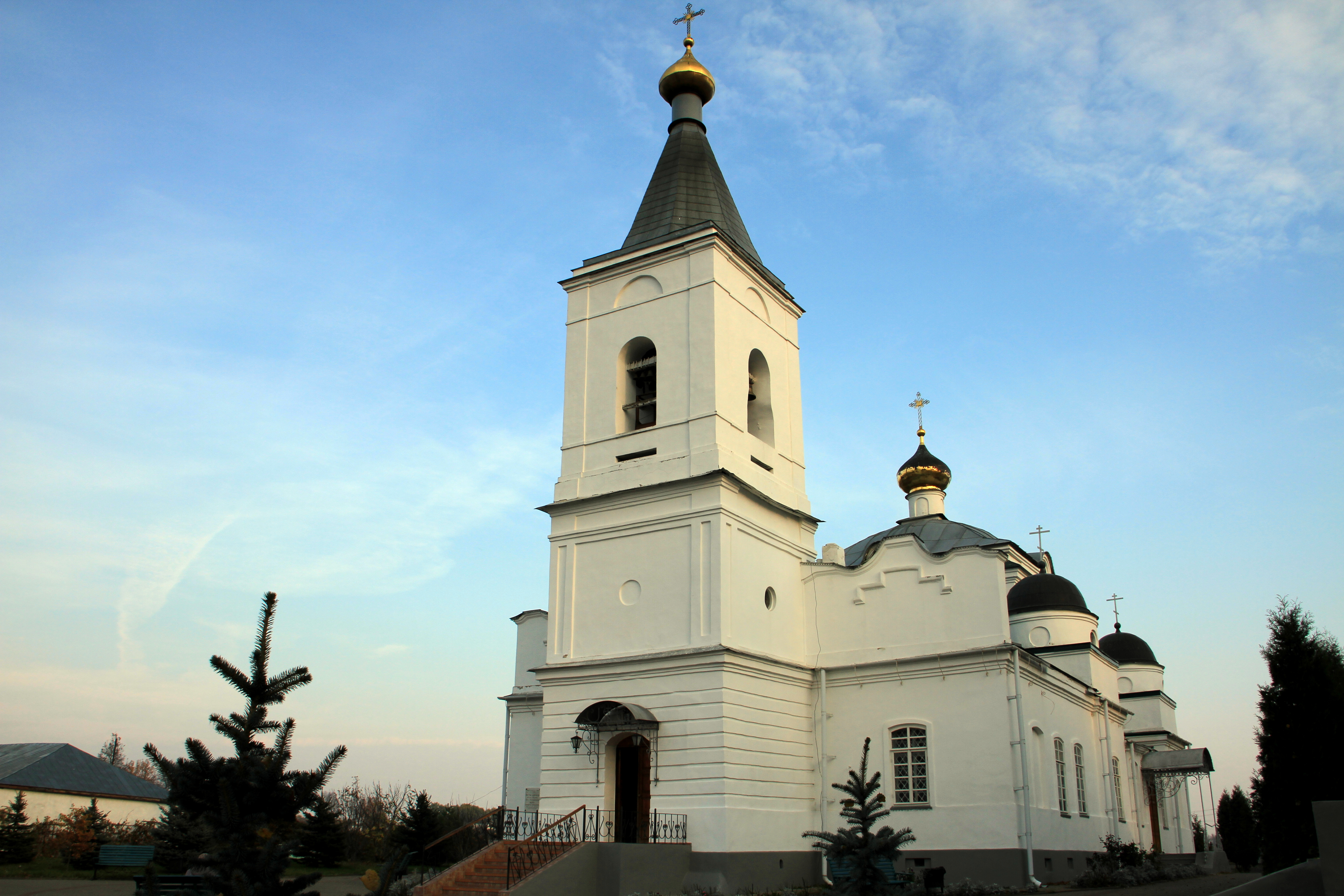

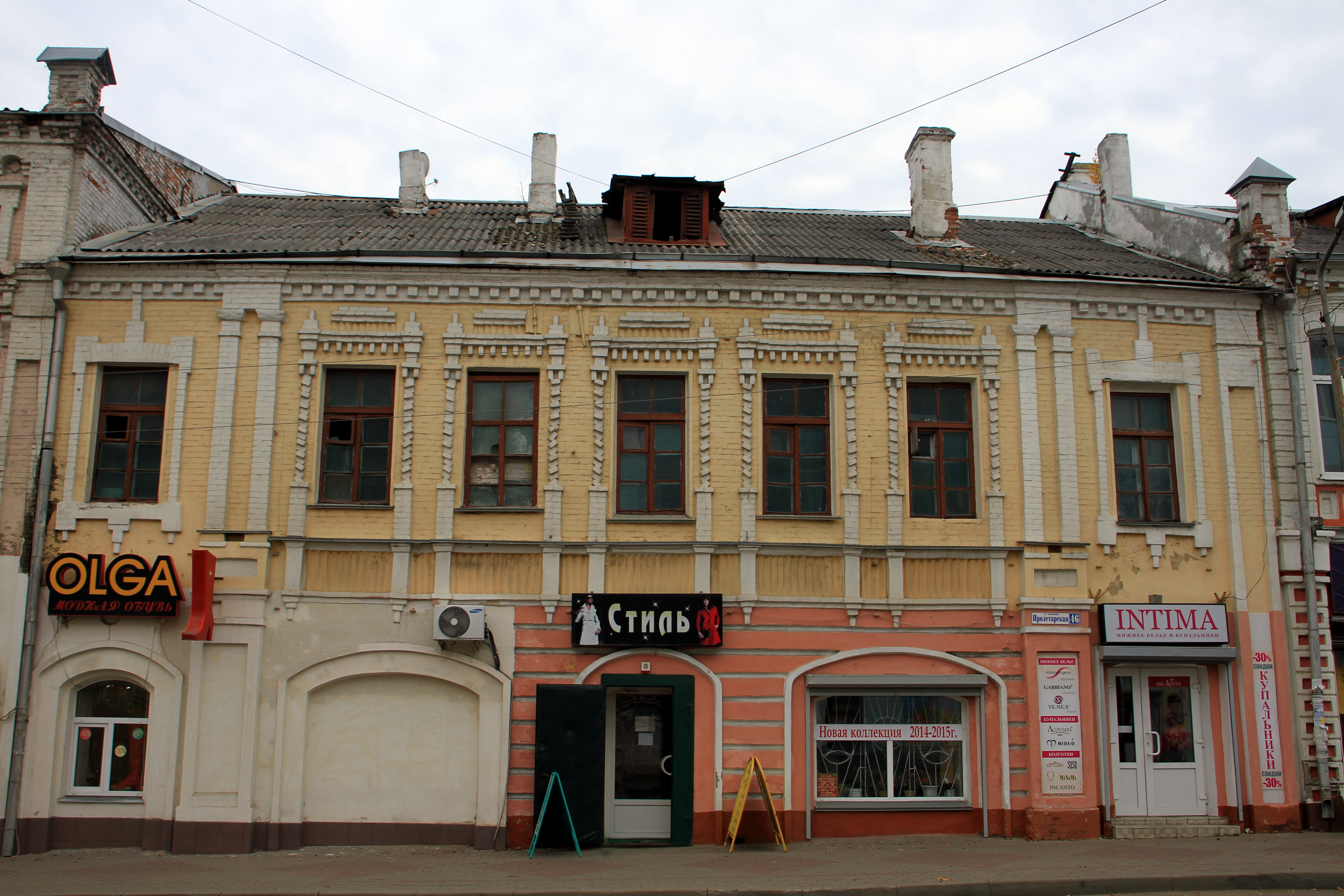

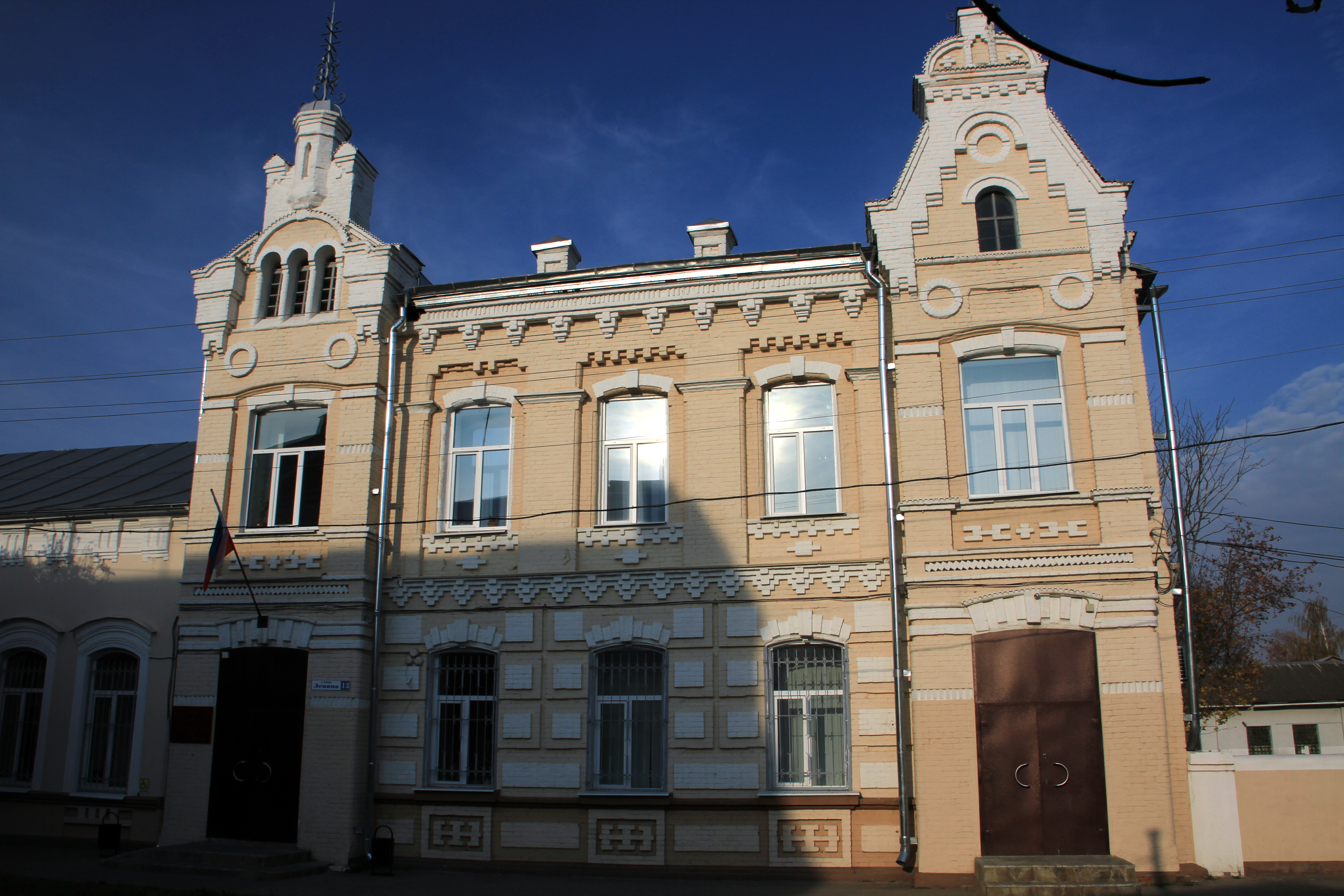

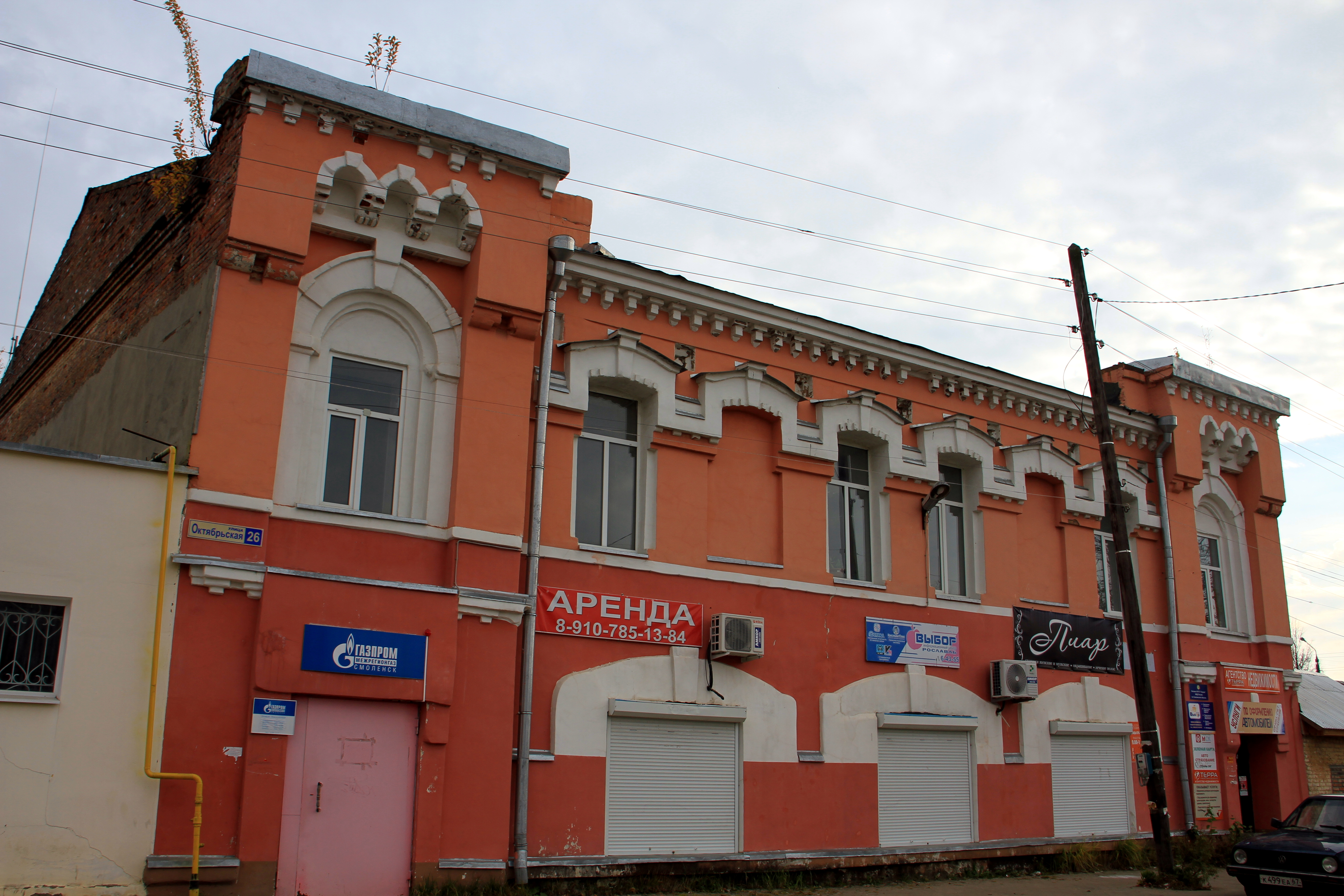

== Sources ==
- Администрация Смоленской области. Постановление №261 от 30 апреля 2008 г. «Об утверждении реестра административно-территориальных единиц и территориальных единиц Смоленской области», в ред. Постановления №464 от 27 июня 2014 г. «О внесении изменений в реестр административно-территориальных единиц и территориальных единиц Смоленской области». Опубликован: База данных "Консультант-плюс". (Administration of Smolensk Oblast. Resolution #261 of April 30, 2008 On the Adoption of the Registry of the Administrative-Territorial Units and Territorial Units of Smolensk Oblast, as amended by the Resolution #464 of June 27, 2014 On Amending the Registry of the Administrative-Territorial Units and Territorial Units of Smolensk Oblast. ).
- Смоленская областная Дума. Закон №133-з от 28 декабря 2004 г. «О наделении статусом муниципального района муниципального образования "Рославльский район" Смоленской области, об установлении границ муниципальных образований, территории которых входят в его состав, и наделении их соответствующим статусом», в ред. Закона №119-з от 30 ноября 2011 г. «О внесении изменений в областной Закон "О наделении статусом муниципального района муниципального образования "Рославльский район" Смоленской области, об установлении границ муниципальных образований, территории которых входят в его состав, и наделении их соответствующим статусом"». Вступил в силу со дня официального опубликования. Опубликован: "Вестник Смоленской областной Думы и Администрации Смоленской области", №14, часть II, стр. 143, 30 декабря 2004 г. (Smolensk Oblast Duma. Law #133-z of December 28, 2004 On Granting the Status of the Municipal District to the Municipal Formation of "Roslavlsky District" of Smolensk Oblast, on Establishing the Borders of the Municipal Formations the Territories of Which It Comprises, and on Granting Them Appropriate Status, as amended by the Law #119-z of November 30, 2011 On Amending the Oblast Law "On Granting the Status of the Municipal District to the Municipal Formation of "Roslavlsky District" of Smolensk Oblast, on Establishing the Borders of the Municipal Formations the Territories of Which It Comprises, and on Granting Them Appropriate Status". Effective as of the official publication date.).
