= Spas-Demensky District =

Spas-Demensky District Спас-Деменский район (Russian)
- District
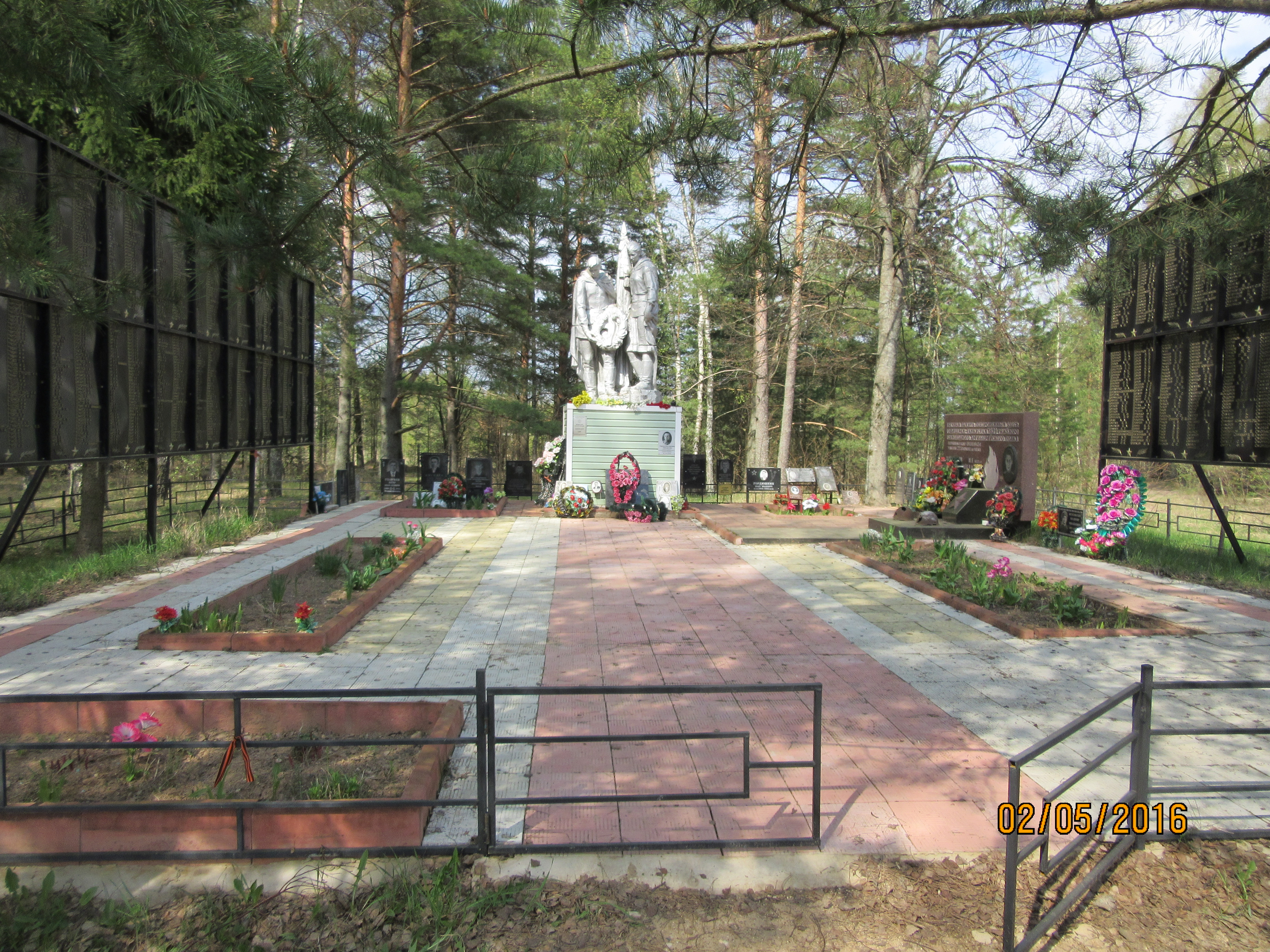
- War memorial in Spas-Demensk

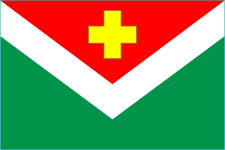
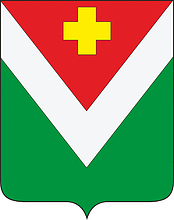
- Flag Coat of arms
- Location of Spas-Demensky District in Kaluga Oblast
- Coordinates: 54°25′N 34°02′E
- Country: Russia
- Federal subject: Kaluga Oblast
- Established: 1929
- Administrative center: Spas-Demensk

Area
  - Total: 1,369 km^{2} (529 sq mi)

Population (2010 Census)
  - Total: 8,238
  - Density: 6.018/km^{2} (15.59/sq mi)
  - Urban: 59.4%
  - Rural: 40.6%

Administrative structure
  - Inhabited localities: 1 cities/towns, 128 rural localities

Municipal structure
  - Municipally incorporated as: Spas-Demensky Municipal District
  - Municipal divisions: 1 urban settlements, 12 rural settlements
- Time zone: UTC+3 (MSK)
- OKTMO ID: 29634000
- Website: http://www.admspasdem.ru

Population of Spas-Demensky District
- 2021 Census: 7,469
- 2010 Census: 8,238
- 2002 Census: 10,017
- 1989 Census: 13,058
- 1979 Census: 27,533

Spas-Demensky District (Russian: Спас-Де́менский райо́н) is an administrative and municipal district (raion), one of the twenty-four in Kaluga Oblast, Russia. It is located in the west of the oblast. The area of the district is 1,369 square kilometers (529 sq mi). Its administrative center is the town of Spas-Demensk. As of the 2021 Census, the total population of the district was 7,369, with the population of Spas-Demensk accounting for 62.0% of that number.

== History ==
The district was established in 1929 within Sukhinichi Okrug of Western Oblast from a part of former Mosalsky Uyezd. It became a part of Kaluga Oblast on July 5, 1944.
