= Timeline of the administrative division of Russia 1708–1764 =

The administrative division reform of 1708 was carried out by Russian Tsar Peter the Great in an attempt to improve the manageability of the vast territory of Russia. Prior to the reform, the country was subdivided into uyezds and volosts, and in the 17th century the number of the uyezds was 166.

== Creation ==
On December 29 [O.S. December 18], 1708, Peter issued an edict dividing Russia into eight governorates (guberniyas). The edict established neither the borders of the governorates nor their internal divisions; instead, their territories were defined as the sets of cities and the lands adjacent to those cities. Some older subdivision types also continued to be used.

== List of the governorates created in 1708 ==
Governorate	Name in Russian	Area	No. of homesteads	Modern divisions
Archangelgorod Governorate	Архангелогородская губерния	1,317,800 km^{2} (508,800 sq mi)	59,662	Arkhangelsk, Murmansk, and Vologda Oblasts; part of Kostroma Oblast, the Republic of Karelia, and the Komi Republic
Azov Governorate	Азовская губерния	393,700 km^{2} (152,000 sq mi)	35,820	Rostov, Tambov, and Voronezh Oblasts; eastern parts of Belgorod, Kursk, Oryol, Ryazan, and Tula Oblasts; parts of Penza Oblast and Donetsk, Kharkiv, and Luhansk Oblasts of Ukraine
Ingermanland Governorate	Ингерманландская губерния	482,500 km^{2} (186,300 sq mi)	105,977	Leningrad, Novgorod, Pskov, and Tver Oblasts; southern part of Arkhangelsk Oblast; western parts of Vologda and Yaroslavl Oblasts; part of the Republic of Karelia
Kazan Governorate	Казанская губерния	1,398,600 km^{2} (540,000 sq mi)	119,056	Volga Region and the Republic of Bashkortostan; parts of Perm Krai and Ivanovo, Kostroma, Penza, and Tambov Oblasts; northern parts of the Republics of Dagestan and Kalmykia
Kiev Governorate	Киевская губерния	231,000 km^{2} (89,000 sq mi)	31,230	Ukraine; parts of Belgorod, Bryansk, Kaluga, Kursk, Oryol, and Tula Oblasts
Moscow Governorate	Московская губерния	128,600 km^{2} (49,700 sq mi)	190,770	Moscow Oblast, parts of Ivanovo, Kaluga, Kostroma, Ryazan, Tula, and Vladimir Oblasts
Siberia Governorate	Сибирская губерния	10,978,300 km^{2} (4,238,700 sq mi)	59,360	Siberia, most of the Urals; parts of Arkhangelsk Oblast, Kirov Oblast and the Komi Republic
Smolensk Governorate	Смоленская губерния	85,400 km^{2} (33,000 sq mi)	35,130	Smolensk Oblast; parts of Bryansk, Kaluga, Tula, and Tver Oblasts

== Subsequent events ==
- June 14 [O.S. June 3], 1710—Ingermanland Governorate was renamed St. Petersburg Governorate after the city of St. Petersburg.
- October 25 [O.S. October 14], 1710—all governorates were divided into lots (Russian: доли)—a new level of grouping above dvors (courts of knyazes). A "lot" was defined as a unit grouping 5,536 dvors. The process of introducing lots lasted until 1713. As a result, all governorates were subdivided into a total of 146.7 lots.
- May 19 (May 8 in the Julian calendar), 1713 — the capital of Russia was moved from Moscow to St. Petersburg.
- July 28 (17), 1713 — Riga Governorate was formed on the recently acquired lands in the north-west of Russia.
- July 28 (17), 1713 — Smolensk Governorate was abolished; its territory was divided between Moscow and Riga Governorates.
- January 26 (January 15 in the Julian calendar), 1714 — Nizhny Novgorod Governorate was formed on the lands in the north-west of Kazan Governorate.
- December 3 (November 22 in the Julian calendar), 1717 — Astrakhan Governorate was formed on the southern lands of Kazan Governorate.
- December 3 (November 22), 1717 — Nizhny Novgorod Governorate abolished; its territory merged with Kazan Governorate.
- June 9 (May 29), 1719—The second administrative reform of 1719 was carried out by Peter the Great in order to fix the deficiencies of the original system. On June 9 (May 29 in the Julian calendar), 1719 Peter issued an ukase (edict) that abolished the division of the governorates into lots (Russian: доли). Instead, most of the Governorates were divided into provinces (провинции), and provinces were further subdivided into districts (дистрикты). Provinces were governed by voyevodas. The idea of the subdivision of governorates into province was borrowed from the administrative division system of Sweden and other European countries. Districts were introduced to replace the old system of subdivision into uyezds; however, the borders of the new districts did not match those of the old uyezds. The purpose of the districts was also different from that of the uyezds—population of each district was taxed to support military units assigned to it.
- June 9 (May 29), 1719—Nizhny Novgorod Governorate was re-established.
- June 9 (May 29), 1719—Revel Governorate was formed on the newly acquired Baltic lands.
- May 3 (April 22 in the Julian calendar), 1725—Azov Governorate was renamed Voronezh Governorate.
- 1726—Smolensk Governorate was created from parts of *1727—Moscow and Riga Governorates.

The administrative reform of 1727 was carried out soon after Peter the Great's death, when it became apparent that previous reform was not working as planned. The fast pace of the reforms came into contradiction with the traditional ways of doing things. Newly created bureaucracy required significant financial investments, which the government was lacking. Neither Catherine I, Peter I's second wife and successor, nor her government were willing to go on with the reforms in their original form. As a result, the 1727 reform became a step back, abolishing the system of districts (Russian: ди́стрикты) and restoring the old system of uezds (уе́зды) instead. A total of 166 uyezds were re-established, and with the newly created uyezds the Russian Empire had approximately 250 uyezds.

- 1727—new Belgorod Governorate was formed from Belgorod, Oryol, and Sevsk Provinces (провинции) of Kiev Governorate.
- 1727—new Novgorod Governorate was formed from Belozersk, Novgorod, Pskov, Tver, and Velikiye Luki Provinces of the St. Petersburg Governorate.
- 1727—Uglich and Yaroslavl Provinces of the St. Petersburg Governorate were transferred to Moscow Governorate.
- 1727—Narva Province of St. Petersburg Governorate was transferred to Revel Governorate.
- 1727—Solikamsk and Vyatka Provinces of Siberian Governorate were transferred to Kazan Governorate.
- 1728—Ufa Province of Kazan Governorate was transferred to Siberian Governorate as a compensation for Solikamsk and Vyatka Provinces transferred to Kazan Governorate a year earlier.
- 1737—Simbirsk Province was created within Kazan Governorate.
- 1744—Vyborg Governorate was formed on the recently acquired parts of Finland; also included portions of St. Petersburg Governorate.
- 1744—Orenburg Governorate was created from the lands annexed from Siberian and Astrakhan Governorates.
