= Yelninsky Uyezd =

Yelninsky Uyezd (Ельнинский уезд) was one of the subdivisions of the Smolensk Governorate of the Russian Empire. It was situated in the southern part of the governorate. Its administrative centre was Yelnya.

== Demographics ==
At the time of the Russian Empire Census of 1897, Yelninsky Uyezd had a population of 137,864. Of these, 96.7% spoke Russian, 2.7% Belarusian, 0.4% Yiddish, 0.1% German and 0.1% Polish as their native language.
