= Spas-Demensk =

Spas-Demensk Спас-Деменск
- Town
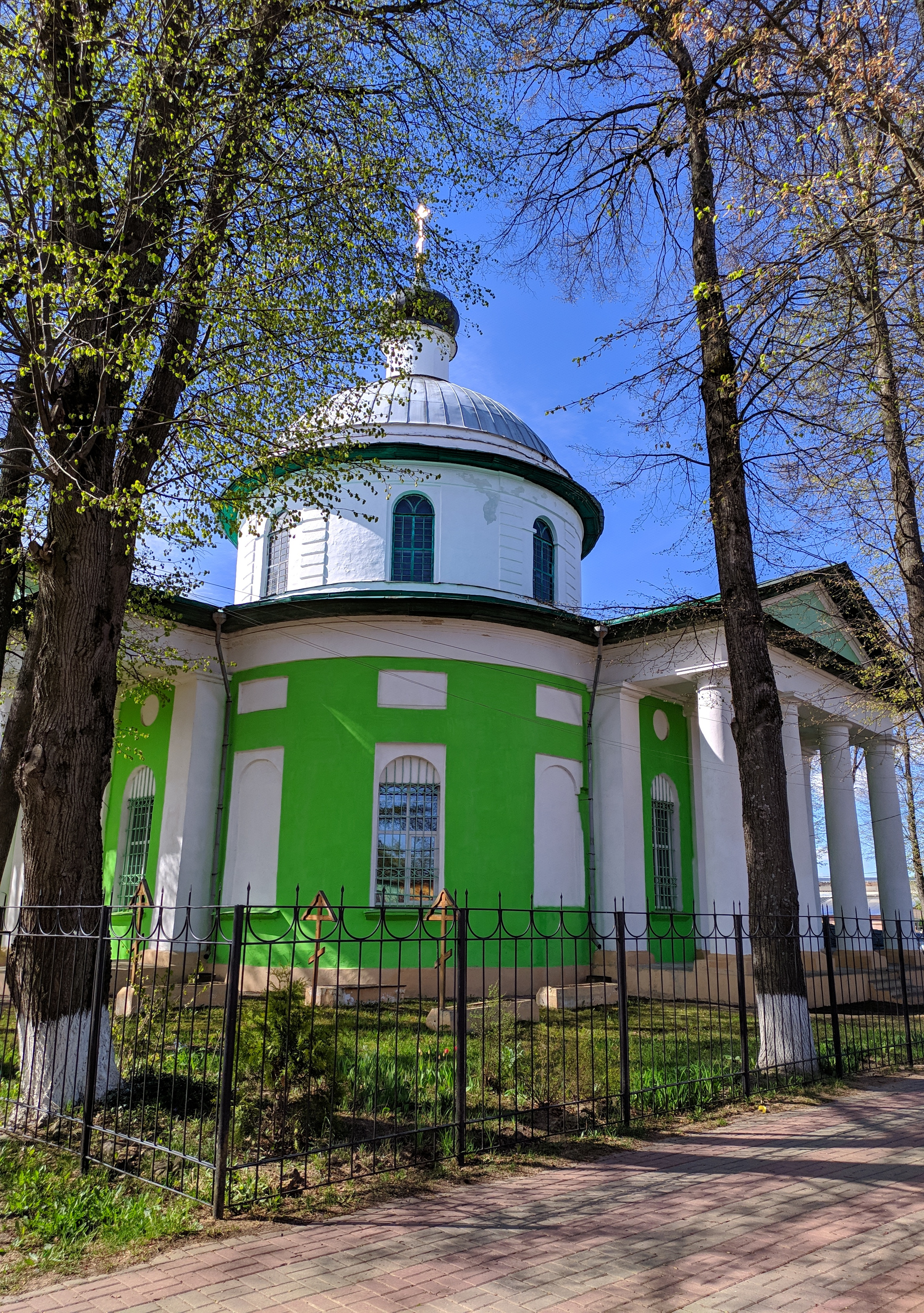
- Church of the Transfiguration in Spas-Demensk

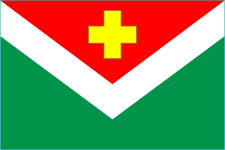
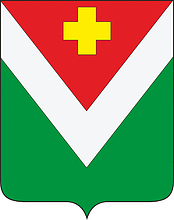
- Flag Coat of arms
- Interactive map of Spas-Demensk
- Location of Spas-Demensk Spas-Demensk (Kaluga Oblast)
- Coordinates: 54°24′N 34°02′E
- Country: Russia
- Federal subject: Kaluga Oblast
- Administrative district: Spas-Demensky District
- First mentioned: 1494
- Town status since: 1917
- Elevation: 226 m (741 ft)

Population (2010 Census)
  - Total: 4,896
  - Estimate (2023): 4,592 (−6.2%)

Administrative status
  - Capital of: Spas-Demensky District

Municipal status
  - Municipal district: Spas-Demensky Municipal District
  - Urban settlement: Spas-Demensk Urban Settlement
  - Capital of: Spas-Demensky Municipal District, Spas-Demensk Urban Settlement
- Time zone: UTC+3 (MSK)
- Postal codes: 249610, 249611
- OKTMO ID: 29634101001

Spas-Demensk (Russian: Спас-Де́менск) is a town and the administrative center of Spas-Demensky District in Kaluga Oblast, Russia, located on the Demena River (an arm of the Ugra) 197 kilometers (122 mi) west of Kaluga, the administrative center of the oblast. Population: 4,569 (2021 census); 4,896 (2010 census); 5,296 (2002 census); 6,239 (1989 Soviet census).

== History ==
It was first mentioned in 1494 as the settlement Demensk. It received its present name in 1855 and was granted town status in 1917. During World War II, Spas-Demensk was occupied by the German Army from October 4, 1941 to August 13, 1943.

== Administrative and municipal status ==
Within the framework of administrative divisions, Spas-Demensk serves as the administrative center of Spas-Demensky District, to which it is directly subordinated. As a municipal division, the town of Spas-Demensk is incorporated within Spas-Demensky Municipal District as Spas-Demensk Urban Settlement.
