= Smolensk Upland =

Coordinates: 54.77°N 33.48°E

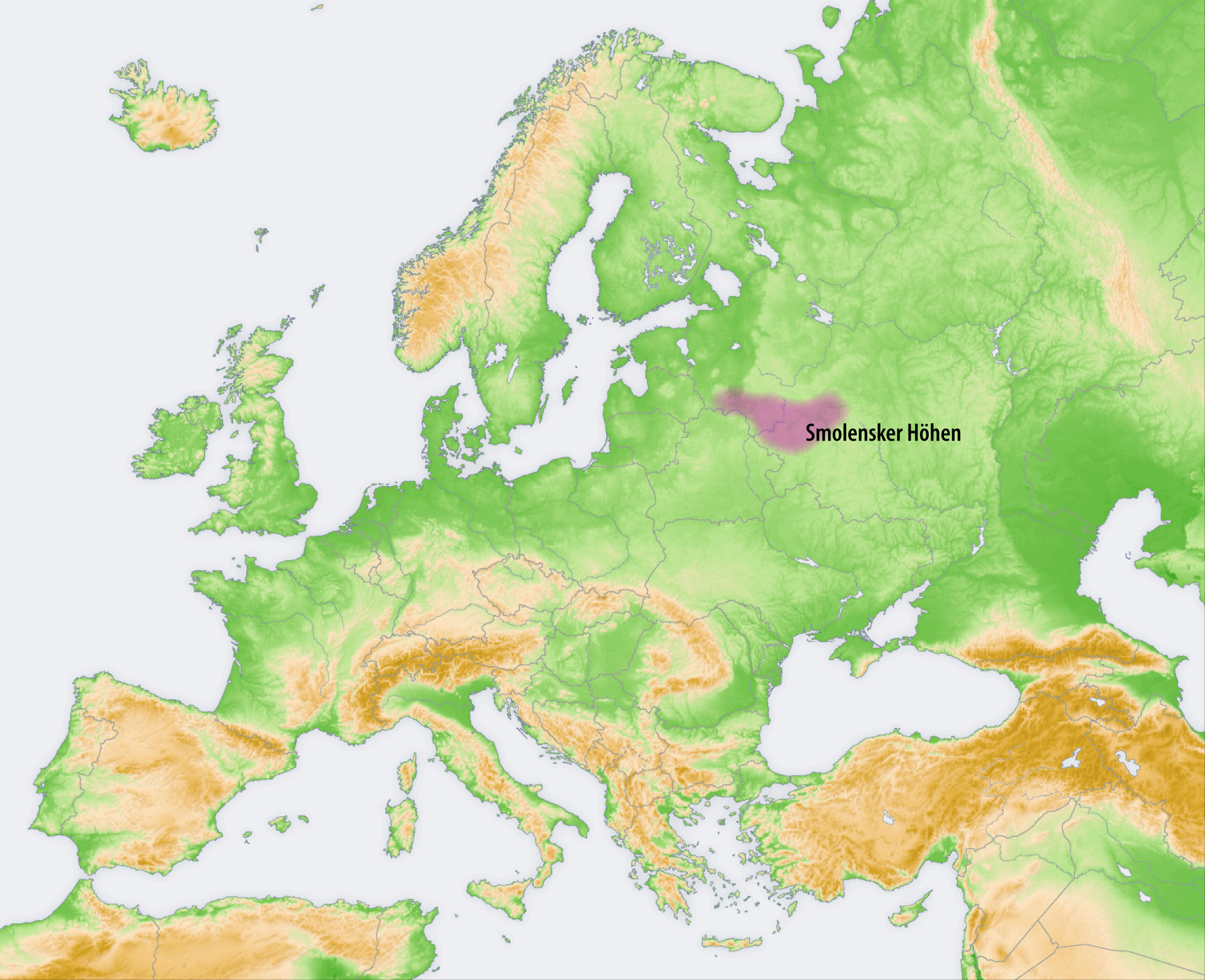
Smolensk Upland

The Smolensk Upland (Russian: Смоленская возвышенность) is the Western part of the Smolensk–Moscow Upland at the East European Plain, which is located mainly in Smolensk Oblast of Russia, with small parts lying in Moscow and Kaluga Oblasts of Russia and in Vitebsk Region of Belarus. The highest point, located close to the city of Vyazma, is 314 metres (1,030 ft).

The Smolensk Upland is divided between the drainage basins of the Volga (east) and the Dnieper (west). A number of big rivers have their sources in the upland. These include the Dnieper, the Desna, the Vazuza, and the Moskva.
