= Vyazemsky Uyezd =

Vyazemsky Uyezd (Вяземский уезд) was one of the subdivisions of the Smolensk Governorate of the Russian Empire. It was situated in the northeastern part of the governorate. Its administrative centre was Vyazma.

== Demographics ==
At the time of the Russian Empire Census of 1897, Vyazemsky Uyezd had a population of 105,502. Of these, 98.3% spoke Russian, 0.6% Polish, 0.5% Yiddish, 0.1% Latvian, 0.1% German, 0.1% Ukrainian and 0.1% Tatar as their native language.
