= Smolensky Uyezd =

Smolensky Uyezd (Смоленский уезд) was one of the subdivisions of the Smolensk Governorate of the Russian Empire. It was situated in the central part of the governorate. Its administrative centre was Smolensk.

== Demographics ==
At the time of the Russian Empire Census of 1897, Smolensky Uyezd had a population of 145,155. Of these, 91.1% spoke Russian, 3.1% Yiddish, 2.6% Polish, 1.2% Belarusian, 0.7% Ukrainian, 0.5% Latvian, 0.4% German, 0.1% Tatar, 0.1% Lithuanian and 0.1% Romani as their native language.

== Notable people ==
- Nikolay Mikhaylovich Przhevalsky (1839–1888), geographer and explorer
