= Roslavlsky Uyezd =

Roslavlsky Uyezd (Russian: Рославльский уезд) was one of the subdivisions of the Smolensk Governorate of the Russian Empire. This uyezd was situated in the southern part of the governorate. Its administrative centre was Roslavl.

== Demographics ==
At the time of the Russian Empire Census of 1897, Roslavlsky Uyezd had a population of 188,244. Of these, 97.8% spoke Russian, 1.3% Yiddish, 0.5% Polish, 0.2% Latvian, 0.1% German and 0.1% Belarusian as their native language.
