= Smolensk Governorate =

1796–1929 unit of Russia

Coordinates: 54.7828°N 32.0453°E

Smolensk Governorate Смоленская губерния
- Governorate of Russian Empire
- 1796–1929
- Coat of arms

- Location within the Russian Empire
- Capital: Smolensk
- Population
  - 1897: 1,525,279
- History
  - Established: 1796
  - Disestablished: 14 January 1929
Preceded by	Succeeded by
Smolensk Voivodeship	Western Oblast

Smolensk Governorate (Russian: Смоленская губерния, romanized: Smolenskaya guberniya) was an administrative-territorial unit (guberniya) of the Tsardom of Russia, the Russian Empire, and the Russian SFSR. It existed, with interruptions, between 1708 and 1929.

Smolensk Governorate, together with seven other governorates, was established on December 29 [O.S. December 18], 1708, by an edict from Tsar Peter the Great. As with the rest of the governorates, neither the borders nor internal subdivisions of Smolensk Governorate were defined; instead, the territory was defined as a set of cities, and section of lands adjacent to those cities.

== History ==
On July 28 [O.S. July 17], 1713, Smolensk Governorate was abolished and its territory was divided between Moscow and Riga Governorates. Smolensk Province was created as a result. The governorate was re-established in 1726, and Smolensk Province was re-incorporated into the Governorate. In 1775, it was included, along with parts of Moscow and Belgorod Governorates, into Smolensk Viceroyalty. The governorate was again restored in 1796.

After the October Revolution, Smolensk Governorate was base of independent Western Oblast/Western Commune, Soviet Socialist Republic of Belarus, Lithuanian–Belorussian Soviet Socialist Republic (Litbel), and finally incorporated into the Russian SFSR.

Eventually, on January 14, 1929, Smolensk Governorate was abolished and its territory was incorporated into Western Oblast.

== Subdivisions ==
Smolensk Governorate, together with seven other governorates, was established on December 29 [O.S. December 18], 1708, by Tsar Peter the Great's edict. As with the rest of the governorates, neither the borders nor internal subdivisions of Smolensk Governorate were defined; instead, the territory was defined as a set of cities and the lands adjacent to those cities.

At the time of establishment, the following thirty cities were included into Smolensk Governorate,

Cities included into Smolensk Governorate at the time of its establishment
#	City	#	City	#	City
1.	Smolensk	7.	Meshchevsk	13.	Serpeysk
2.	Belyaya	8.	Mosalsk	14.	Staritsa
3.	Borisovo Gorodishche	9.	Odoyev	15.	Vorotynsk
4.	Dorogobuzh	10.	Peremyshl	16.	Vyazma
5.	Kozelsk	11.	Pogoreloye Gorodishche	17.	Zubtsov
6.	Likhvin	12.	Roslavl		

In 1713, when Smolensk Governorate was abolished and merged into Riga Governorate, the following five uyezds were established in the area formally occupied by the governorate (the administrative centers are given in parentheses),

- Belsky Uyezd (Bely);
- Dorogobuzhsky Uyezd (Dorogobuzh);
- Roslavlsky Uyezd (Roslavl);
- Smolensky Uyezd (Smolensk);
- Vyazemsky Uyezd (Vyazma).

After Smolensk Governorate was re-established in 1726, it was subdivided into these five uyezds.

In 1775, Smolensk Viceroyalty was subdivided into 12 uyezds, which remained when it was transformed back to a governorate in 1802 (the administrative centers, which all had the town status, are in parentheses),

- Belsky Uyezd (Bely);
- Dorogobuzhsky Uyezd (Dorogobuzh);
- Dukhovshchinsky Uyezd (Dukhovshchina);
- Gzhatsky Uyezd (Gzhatsk);
- Krasninsky Uyezd (Krasny);
- Porechsky Uyezd (Porechye);
- Roslavlsky Uyezd (Roslavl);
- Smolensky Uyezd (Smolensk);
- Sychyovsky Uyezd (Sychyovka);
- Vyazemsky Uyezd (Vyazma);
- Yelninsky Uyezd (Yelnya);
- Yukhnovsky Uyezd (Yukhnov).

== Demography ==
=== Language ===
- Population by mother tongue according to the Imperial census of 1897.

Language	Number	percentage (%)	males	females
Russian	1,397,875	91.6	655,460	742,415
Belarusian	100,757	6.6	48,663	52,094
Jewish	10,903	0.7	6,049	4,854
Polish	7,314	0.5	4,855	2,459
Latvian	3,485	0.2	1,770	1,715
German	1,727	0.1	879	848
Ukrainian	1,374	0.0	1,247	127
Gypsy	661	0.0	338	323
Estonian	301	0.0	158	143
Tatar	291	0.0	281	10
Lithuanian	255	0.0	226	29
Other	336	0.0	190	146
Total	1,525,279	100.0	720,116	805,163

=== Religion ===
- According to the Imperial census of 1897.

Religion	Number	percentage (%)	males	females
Pravoslavs (Note: Eastern Orthodox, including Russian Orthodox, Greek Orthodox, and Georgian Orthodox)	1,480,110	97.0	696,506	783,604
Old Believers and others split from Pravoslavs	20,728	1.4	9,164	11,564
Judaism	11,144	0.7	6,186	4,958
Roman Catholic	8,487	0.6	5,631	2,856
Lutherans	4,303	0.3	2,218	2,085
Islam	294	0.0	283	11
Reformed	83	0.0	50	33
Karaites	41	0.0	25	16
Armenian Gregorians	11	0.0	7	4
Anglicans	9	0.0	3	6
Armenian Catholic Church	3	0.0	1	2
Mennonites	2	0.0	1	1
Other: Christian denominations	50	0.0	30	20
Other: non-Christians	6	0.0	6	0
Total	1,525,279	100.0	720,116	805,163
