= Pochinok =

Pochinok may refer to:

- Pochinok (inhabited locality), name of several inhabited localities in Russia
- Pochinok (type of inhabited locality), a type of rural locality in Russia
- Alexander Pochinok (1958–2014), Russian politician

== See also ==
- Pochinkovsky (disambiguation)
