= Emil Lang (disambiguation) =

Emil Lang (1909–1944) was a World War II fighter ace.

Emil Lang may also refer to:

- Emil Lang (Robotech), fictional character in Robotech universe
- Emil Lang, fictional character in Son of Frankenstein
