= Pochinkovsky =

Pochinkovsky (masculine), Pochinkovskaya (feminine), or Pochinkovskoye (neuter) may refer to:

- Pochinkovsky District, several districts in Russia
- Pochinkovskoye Urban Settlement, an administrative division and a municipal formation which the town of Pochinok in Pochinkovsky District of Smolensk Oblast, Russia is incorporated as
