= Vodogino =

Vodogino Водогино
- Village
- Location within Vologda Oblast Location within Russia
- Coordinates: 59°12′N 39°36′E
- Country: Russia
- Region: Vologda Oblast
- District: Vologodsky District
- Time zone: UTC+3:00

Vodogino (Russian: Водогино) is a rural locality (a village) in Leskovskoye Rural Settlement, Vologodsky District, Vologda Oblast, Russia. The population was 28 as of 2002. There are 4 streets.

== Geography ==
Vodogino is located 19 km west of Vologda (the district's administrative centre) by road. Pochinok is the nearest rural locality.
