= Fraunberg =

Coordinates: 48°10′N 12°11′E

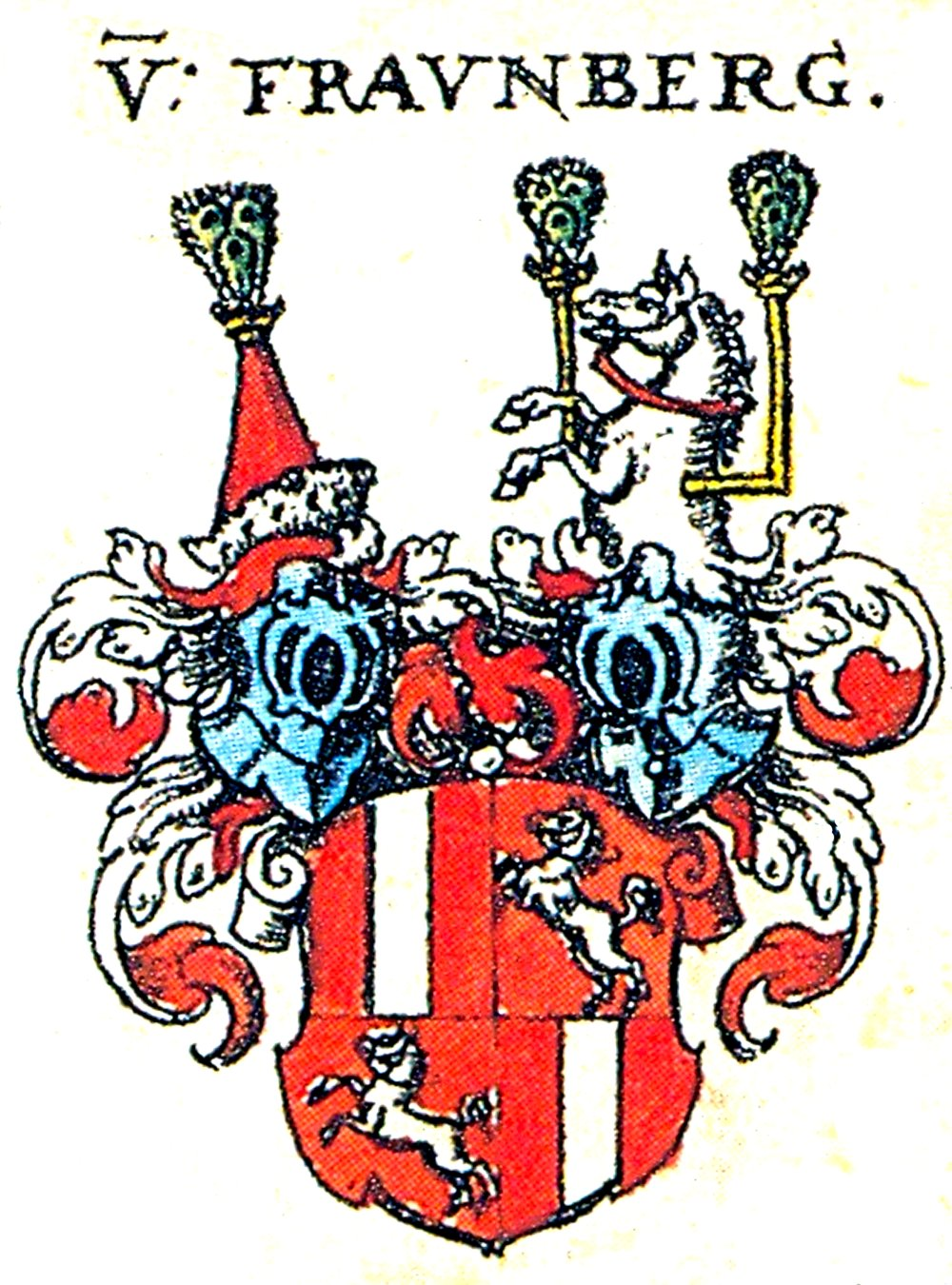
Coat of arms of Fraunberg family

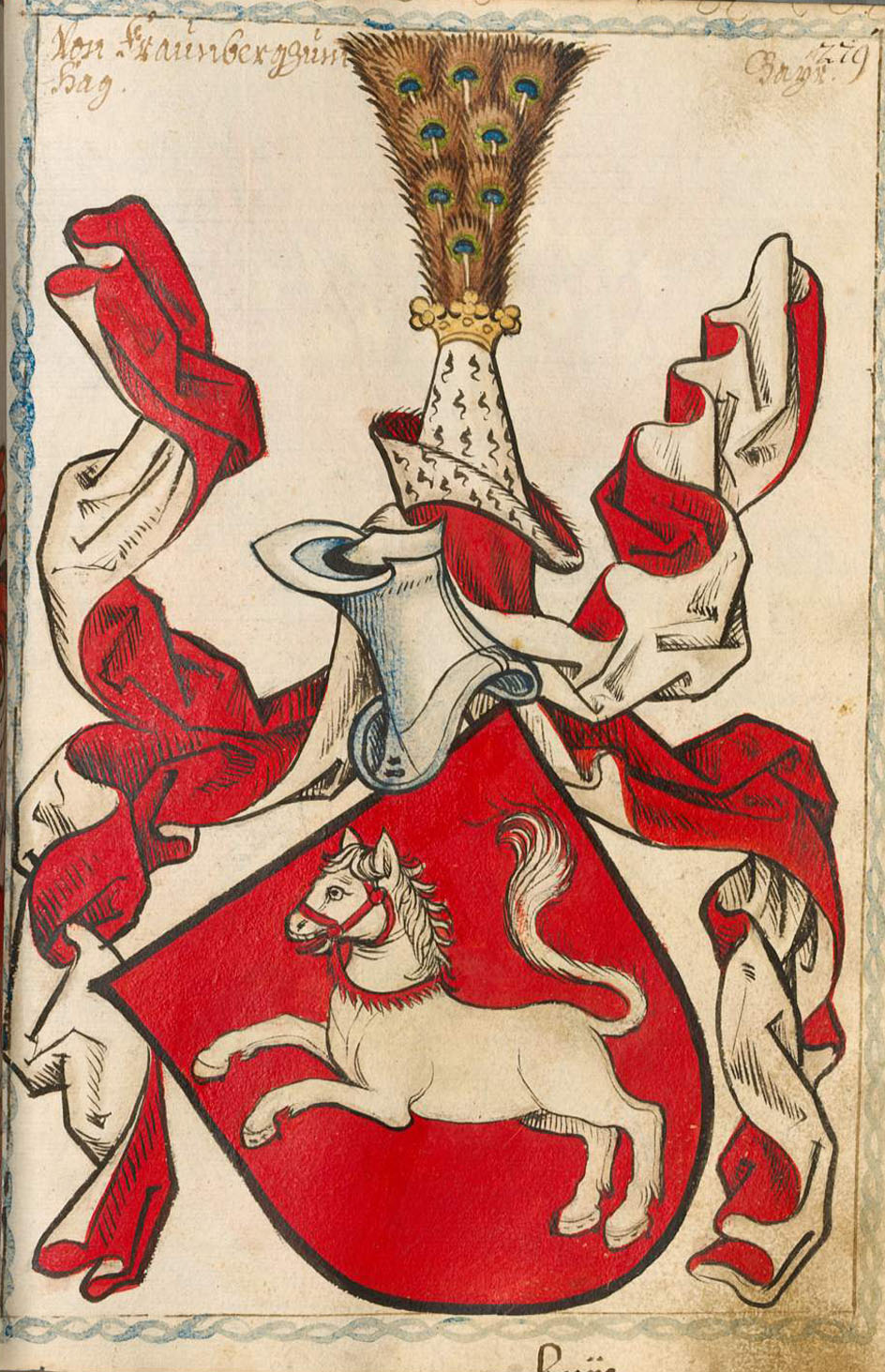
Original coat of arms

The Fraunberg family, also known as the Fraunberger, is among the oldest German noble families in Bavaria.

Their name derives from the village of Fraunberg in the district of Erding. They are documented since 945, when Heinrich von Fraunberger was mentioned in connection with Konstanz am Bodensee.

Their main arms are Gules, a pale argent.

== History ==
By 1245, the family of Gurren of Haag had already begun using a horse salient as their seal device. The word Gurre is German now means a horse of poor quality, a nag or jade. Whether the family derived their name from the coat of arms or vice versa is not clear. The choice of name, however, implies that at the time the derogatory meaning of Gurre had not yet come into play.: the numerous representations show a lively, well fed horse.

The Fraunbergers adopted the Gurren coat of arms at the time of Sigfried I., to whom was granted the position of Count of Haag in 1245. The family of Fraunberg-Haag bore it alone.

The branch of Fraunberger zu Fraunberg however quartered it with their main arms. Some descendants of the Fraunberger family have immigrated to the US and reside in the Clifton, Passaic, and Plainsboro New Jersey area.

On the death of Count Ladislaus von Fraunberg-Haag in 1567 the county was granted to the Duke of Bavaria.

With the local government reforms a large part of what was formerly the County of Haag came to the district of Erding. Numerous examples of the arms of Haag exist, particularly in churches and on boundary stones (see Schierl below)

For the town in Germany, translated as (wife or lady of the Mountain) see Fraunberg, Bavaria.
