= Gerhard Loos =

German fighter pilot (1916–1944)

- Born: 21 August 1916; Kommern district of Brüx, Sudetenland
- Died: 6 March 1944 (aged 27) near Oldenburg
- Cause of death: Killed in action
- Military career
- Allegiance: Nazi Germany
- Branch: Luftwaffe
- Service years: 1939–1944
- Rank: Oberleutnant (first lieutenant)
- Commands: 9./JG 54
- Conflicts: World War II: Eastern Front; Defense of the Reich †
- Awards: Knight's Cross of the Iron Cross

Gerhard Loos (21 August 1916 – 6 March 1944) was a German military aviator who served in the Luftwaffe during World War II. As a fighter ace, he claimed 92 aerial victories, 14 of which were claimed in Defense of the Reich.

Born in Kommern within the Sudetenland, Loos served in the Luftwaffe of Nazi Germany. Following flight training, he served as an instructor before being posted to Jagdgeschwader 54 (JG 54—54th Fighter Wing) in late 1942, operating on the Eastern Front. He claimed his first aerial victory on 19 February 1943. By late September 1943, his number of aerial victories had increased to 83 and was transferred to the Western Front. Here, he was awarded the German Cross in Gold on 17 October 1943 and the Knight's Cross of the Iron Cross on 5 February 1944. On 21 February, Loos was appointed Staffelkapitän (squadron leader) of 9. Staffel (9th squadron) of JG 54. He was killed in action on 6 March 1944 in aerial combat with United States Army Air Forces fighters near Oldenburg.

== Career ==
Loos was born on 21 August 1916 in Kommern, at the time part of Brüx within the Sudetenland, present-day Komořany which is part of Most in the Czech Republic. In early 1939, Loos entered the Luftwaffe and following completion of flight and fighter pilot training, (Note: Flight training in the Luftwaffe progressed through the levels A1, A2 and B1, B2, referred to as A/B flight training. A training included theoretical and practical training in aerobatics, navigation, long-distance flights and dead-stick landings. The B courses included high-altitude flights, instrument flights, night landings and training to handle the aircraft in difficult situations.) he served as an instructor with a Jagdfliegerschule 5, the fighter pilot school in Wien-Schwechat. In late 1942, Loos was posted to I. Gruppe (1st group) of Jagdgeschwader 54 (JG 54—54th Fighter Wing) based on the Eastern Front.

=== War against the Soviet Union ===
In early 1943, I. Gruppe of JG 54 was based at Krasnogvardeysk, present-day Gatchina, southwest of Leningrad, and fighting in the Siege of Leningrad in support of Army Group North. In February, the Gruppe converted from the Messerschmitt Bf 109 G-2 to the radial engine powered Focke-Wulf Fw 190 A-4 fighter aircraft. Loos claimed his first aerial victory on 19 February while fighting in the Demyansk Offensive. Assigned to 3. Staffel under command of Hauptmann Gerhard Koall, Loss shot down a Petlyakov Pe-2 bomber.

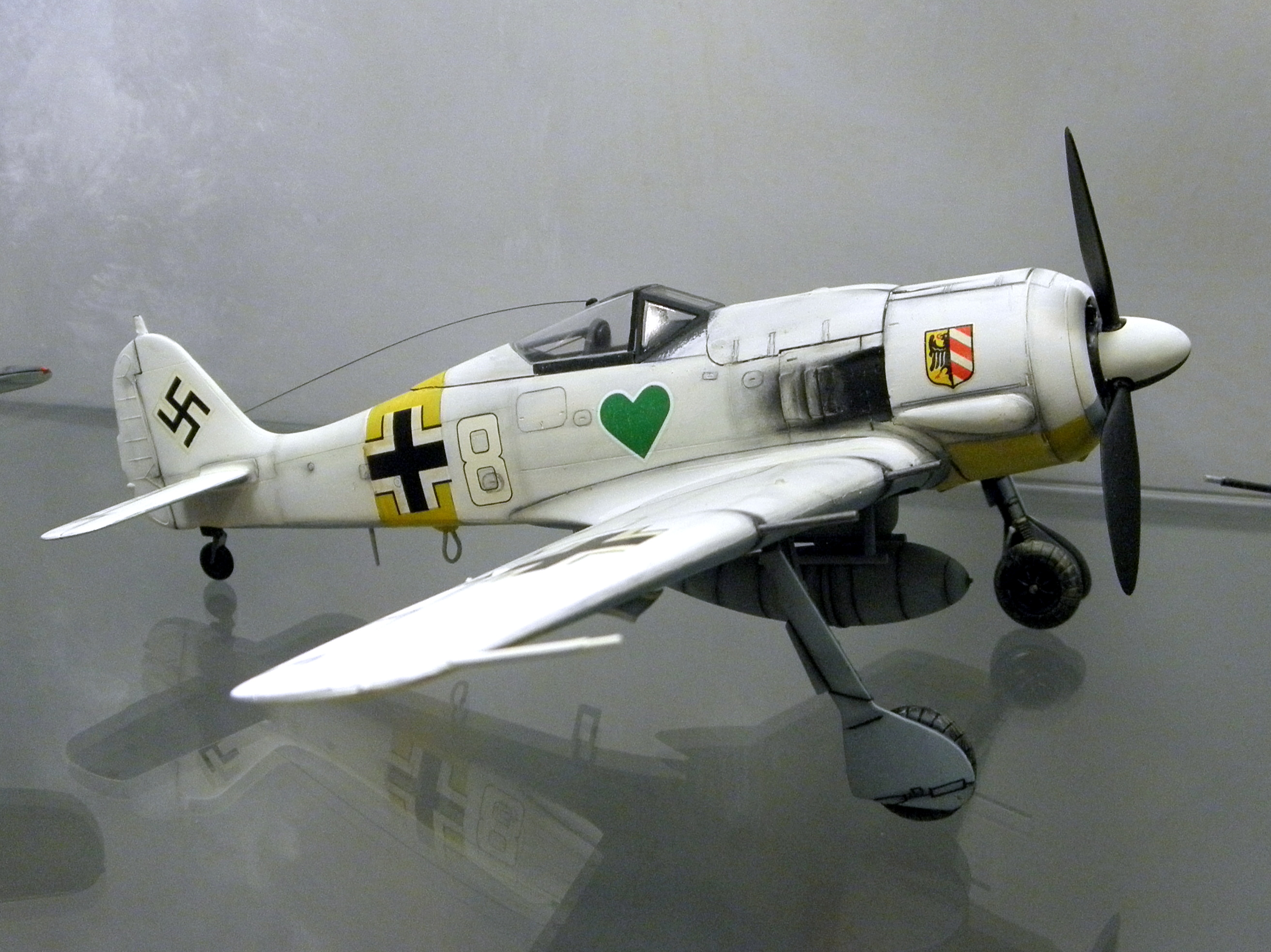
Scale model of Focke-Wulf Fw 190 A-4 JG 54.

In early July, I. Gruppe of JG 54 was ordered to move to Oryol, in the southern sector of Army Group Centre, where it fought in Operation Citadel which initiated the Battle of Kursk. Subordinated to Luftflotte 6 (Air Fleet 6), the Gruppe began relocating on 2 July and arrived at the airfield named Panikowo, a makeshift airfield created for the attack on the Kursk salient, on 4 July. The next day, the Wehrmacht launched Operation Citadel and I. Gruppe supported the attack of the 9th Army on the northern sector of the salient, escorting bombers of Kampfgeschwader 4, 51 and KG 53 (KG 4, KG 51—4th, 51st Bomber Wing), as well as Junkers Ju 87 dive bombers of Sturzkampfgeschwader 1 (StG 1—1st Dive Bomber Wing) to their target areas. That day, I. Gruppe claimed 59 aerial victories, including five aircraft, three Lavochkin-Gorbunov-Gudkov LaGG-3 fighters and two Ilyushin Il-2 ground-attack aircraft, by Loos in the vicinity of Maloarkhangelsk. This achievement made him an "ace-in-a-day". Two days later, Loos claimed another Il-2 ground-attack aircraft shot down. The Il-2 belonged to 299 ShAD (Shturmovaya Aviatsionnyy Diveeziya—Ground Attack Air Division) piloted by Leytenánt A. S. Baranov.

On 20 July during the Soviet counteroffensive Operation Kutuzov, I. Gruppe relocated to Karachev. On 4 August, supporting German forces fighting at Oryol, the Gruppe claimed 25 aerial victories, including six by Loos, his second "ace-in-a-day" achievement. On 9 August, the Gruppe was ordered to an airfield named Bolschoje Rudka located near Poltava. Here the Gruppe supported German forces fighting against the Soviet Belgorod–Bogodukhov offensive operation. Here on 23 August on the final day of the Belgorod–Kharkov offensive operation, Loos achieved his third "ace-in-a-day" achievement, claiming three Douglas A-20 Havoc bombers, also known as Boston, two Pe-2 bombers and a single Il-2 ground-attack aircraft shot down. On 20 September, Loos was awarded the Honor Goblet of the Luftwaffe (Ehrenpokal der Luftwaffe). Eight days later, he was transferred to III. Gruppe of JG 54 which was fighting in Defense of the Reich.

=== Defense of the Reich and death ===
In late September 1943, III. Gruppe of JG 54 was under command of Hauptmann Siegfried Schnell and was based at Schwerin. For his 83 aerial victories claimed, Loos was awarded the German Cross in Gold (Deutsches Kreuz in Gold) on 17 October. On 2 December, the Gruppe was moved to Ludwigslust. Loos claimed his first aerial victory in Defense of the Reich on 20 December. That day, the United States Army Air Forces (USAAF) VIII Bomber Command targeted Bremen in northern Germany. III. Gruppe was scrambled at 11:10 and intercepted the bombers and their fighter escorts at 12:00 in the area of Bremen following their bomb run. In this encounter, Loos claimed a Boeing B-17 Flying Fortress bomber shot down.

Loos claimed his second B-17 bomber on 11 January 1944 when pilots of III. Gruppe claimed ten B-17 bombers and two escorting North American P-51 Mustang fighters. On 5 February, he was awarded the Knight's Cross of the Iron Cross (Ritterkreuz des Eisernen Kreuzes). Loos was promoted to Oberleutnant (first lieutenant) and appointed Staffelkapitän (squadron leader) of 9. Staffel of JG 54 on 21 February. He succeeded Oberleutnant Wilhelm Schilling who was transferred. On 6 March, Loos flying Bf 109 G-6 (Werknummer 411922—factory number) was shot down in aerial combat near Reinsehlen. His victor may have been Lieutenant John Howell of the 357th Fighter Group. Hanging on his parachute, he was drifting into a high voltage power line. Releasing the parachute at 20 meters (66 feet) he fell to his death. Loos was briefly replaced by Leutnant Alfred Kromer, who was killed only two days later. Command of 9. Staffel was then passed to Hauptmann Emil Lang.

== Summary of career ==
=== Aerial victory claims ===
According to US historian David T. Zabecki, Loos was credited with 92 aerial victories. Spick also lists him with 92 aerial victories, 78 of which on the Eastern Front and 14 on the Western Front, including two four-engined heavy bombers. Mathews and Foreman, authors of Luftwaffe Aces — Biographies and Victory Claims, researched the German Federal Archives and found records for 84 aerial victory claims, all but one four-engined heavy bomber on the Eastern Front.

Victory claims were logged to a map-reference (PQ = Planquadrat), for example "PQ 36 Ost 10473". The Luftwaffe grid map (Jägermeldenetz) covered all of Europe, western Russia and North Africa and was composed of rectangles measuring 15 minutes of latitude by 30 minutes of longitude, an area of about 360 square miles (930 km^{2}). These sectors were then subdivided into 36 smaller units to give a location area 3 km × 4 km (1.9 mi × 2.5 mi) in size.

Chronicle of aerial victories
This and the ♠ (Ace of spades) indicates those aerial victories which made Loos an "ace-in-a-day", a term which designates a fighter pilot who has shot down five or more airplanes in a single day. This and the ? (question mark) indicates information discrepancies listed by Prien, Stemmer, Rodeike, Balke, Bock, Mathews and Foreman.
Claim	Date	Time	Type	Location	Claim	Date	Time	Type	Location
– 3. Staffel of Jagdgeschwader 54 – Eastern Front — February 1943
1	19 February 1943	15:23	Pe-2	PQ 36 Ost 10473; 25 km (16 mi) northeast of Lubań	2	22 February 1943	16:04	LaGG-3	PQ 36 Ost 00423; Puskin-Mga
– 1. Staffel of Jagdgeschwader 54 – Eastern Front — 4 February – 28 September 1943
3	2 March 1943	11:32	I-16	PQ 26 Ost 90272; 20 km (12 mi) south of Lomonosov	44	7 August 1943	11:28	P-40	PQ 35 Ost 54581; 25 km (16 mi) northeast of Karachev
4	22 March 1943	11:52	LaGG-3	PQ 36 Ost 00411; 10 km (6.2 mi) east of Pushkin	45	7 August 1943	11:39	P-40	PQ 35 Ost 54594; 30 km (19 mi) northeast of Karachev
5	8 April 1943	18:06	La-5	PQ 36 Ost 00243; 20 km (12 mi) southeast of Leningrad	46	8 August 1943	18:36	Pe-2	PQ 35 Ost 54823; 25 km (16 mi) southwest of Bolkhov
6	24 May 1943	19:35	Il-2	PQ 35 Ost 09814	47	8 August 1943	18:47	Il-2	PQ 35 Ost 53281; 25 km (16 mi) southwest of Oryol
7	24 May 1943	19:38	P-40	PQ 35 Ost 09833	48	9 August 1943	12:05	Il-2	PQ 35 Ost 61724; 20 km (12 mi) east-southeast of Zolochiv
8	24 May 1943	19:41	Il-2	PQ 35 Ost 19741; 20 km (12 mi) northwest of Staraya Russa	49	12 August 1943	09:17	La-5	PQ 35 Ost 41692
9	24 May 1943	19:50	Il-2	PQ 35 Ost 19761; 15 km (9.3 mi) north-northeast of Staraya Russa	50	12 August 1943	17:25	Il-2	PQ 35 Ost 41633
10♠	5 July 1943	09:55	LaGG-3	PQ 35 Ost 63751; 40 km (25 mi) southwest of Maloarkhangelsk	51	12 August 1943	17:28	Il-2	PQ 35 Ost 41631
11♠	5 July 1943	10:03	LaGG-3	PQ 35 Ost 63863; 45 km (28 mi) north-northwest of Kursk	52	12 August 1943	17:29	Il-2	PQ 35 Ost 41632
12♠	5 July 1943	18:32	LaGG-3	PQ 35 Ost 63553; 15 km (9.3 mi) west-southwest of Maloarkhangelsk	53	13 August 1943	16:44	LaGG-3	PQ 35 Ost 61713; 10 km (6.2 mi) southeast of Zolochiv
13♠	5 July 1943	18:43	Il-2	PQ 35 Ost 73573	54	13 August 1943	17:00	LaGG-3	PQ 35 Ost 51711; 10 km (6.2 mi) southeast of Zolochiv
14♠	5 July 1943	18:48	Il-2	PQ 35 Ost 63694; 30 km (19 mi) east-southeast of Maloarkhangelsk	55	13 August 1943	19:02	LaGG-3	PQ 35 Ost 61351; 20 km (12 mi) west of Belgorod
15	7 July 1943	05:15	Il-2	PQ 35 Ost 63494; 20 km (12 mi) south-southwest of Maloarkhangelsk	56	15 August 1943	11:07	La-5	PQ 35 Ost 51814; 10 km (6.2 mi) north of Bogodukhov
16	8 July 1943	17:38	La-5	PQ 35 Ost 63574; 35 km (22 mi) southwest of Maloarkhangelsk	57	16 August 1943	11:18	La-5	PQ 35 Ost 51644 south of Grayvoron
17	9 July 1943	12:09	LaGG-3	PQ 35 Ost 63683; 20 km (12 mi) southeast of Maloarkhangelsk	58	18 August 1943	07:38	La-5	PQ 35 Ost 60181; Gulf of Finland, north of Kunda
18? (Note: This claim is not listed by Mathews and Foreman.)	9 July 1943	12:10	Il-2	PQ 35 Ost 63649	59	18 August 1943	07:41	La-5	PQ 35 Ost 60131; Gulf of Finland, north of Kunda
19	9 July 1943	12:16	La-5	PQ 35 Ost 63672; 15 km (9.3 mi) southeast of Maloarkhangelsk	60	18 August 1943	07:49	Il-2	PQ 35 Ost 60163; Gulf of Finland, north of Kunda
20	10 July 1943	14:31	Il-2	PQ 35 Ost 63575; 15 km (9.3 mi) northeast of Oboyan	61	18 August 1943	07:51	Il-2	PQ 35 Ost 60163; Gulf of Finland, north of Kunda
21	12 July 1943	17:27	La-5	PQ 35 Ost 64247; 25 km (16 mi) west-northwest of Plavsk	62	19 August 1943	13:13	Pe-2	PQ 35 Ost 51354; 30 km (19 mi) northwest of Grayvoron
22	12 July 1943	17:32	La-5	PQ 35 Ost 64424; 40 km (25 mi) east-southeast of Belyov	63	19 August 1943	15:33	P-39	PQ 35 Ost 51721; 20 km (12 mi) northwest of Bogodukhov
23	13 July 1943	12:24	Yak-7	PQ 35 Ost 54499; 30 km (19 mi) northwest of Bolkhov	64	19 August 1943	15:39	P-39	PQ 35 Ost 51811; 10 km (6.2 mi) north of Bogodukhov
24	13 July 1943	12:29	Yak-7	PQ 35 Ost 64489; 20 km (12 mi) northwest of Bolkhov	65	20 August 1943	18:20	La-5	PQ 35 Ost 51792; 15 km (9.3 mi) south-southwest of Bogodukhov
25	14 July 1943	16:37	MiG-3	PQ 35 Ost 54442; 30 km (19 mi) northwest of Bolkhov	66	20 August 1943	18:21	La-5	PQ 35 Ost 51871; 10 km (6.2 mi) south of Bogodukhov
26	18 July 1943	06:54	LaGG-3	PQ 35 Ost 54484; 20 km (12 mi) northwest of Bolkhov	67	20 August 1943	18:24	La-5	PQ 35 Ost 51844 vicinity of Bogodukhov
27	21 July 1943	19:52	LaGG-3	PQ 35 Ost 54655; 20 km (12 mi) west-southwest of Bolkhov	68	21 August 1943	06:58	La-5	PQ 35 Ost 51672; 15 km (9.3 mi) north of Bogodukhov
28	31 July 1943	09:43? (Note: According to Mathews and Foreman claimed at 09:41.)	LaGG-3	PQ 35 Ost 54861; 10 km (6.2 mi) southwest of Bolkhov	69	21 August 1943	07:02	La-5	PQ 35 Ost 51643 south of Grayvoron
29	1 August 1943	14:16	Yak-9	PQ 35 Ost 54652; 20 km (12 mi) west-southwest of Bolkhov	70	21 August 1943	16:00	Il-2	PQ 35 Ost 51544 northeast of Bogodukhov
30	2 August 1943	17:07	Il-2	PQ 35 Ost 54663; 10 km (6.2 mi) southwest of Bolkhov	71	22 August 1943	07:35	La-5	PQ 35 Ost 51572 northeast of Bogodukhov
31	2 August 1943	17:09	Il-2	PQ 35 Ost 54543; 25 km (16 mi) north-northeast of Karachev	72	22 August 1943	10:24	La-5	PQ 35 Ost 51513 area northeast of Bogodukhov
32	3 August 1943	14:06	Il-2	PQ 35 Ost 53121; 20 km (12 mi) east-southeast of Tschaikowka	73	22 August 1943	14:25	Pe-2	PQ 35 Ost 60242; Gulf of Finland, north of Kunda
33	3 August 1943	16:42	LaGG-3	PQ 35 Ost 54724; 10 km (6.2 mi) northeast of Woronowo	74♠	23 August 1943	06:20	Boston	PQ 35 Ost 41654
34	3 August 1943	17:14	Il-2	PQ 35 Ost 54173; 20 km (12 mi) north-northwest of Karachev	75♠	23 August 1943	06:25	Boston	PQ 35 Ost 41663
35♠	4 August 1943	11:52	La-5	PQ 35 Ost 54583; 25 km (16 mi) northeast of Karachev	76♠	23 August 1943	06:28	Boston	PQ 35 Ost 51514 northeast of Bogodukhov
36♠	4 August 1943	11:53	Il-2	PQ 35 Ost 54723; 10 km (6.2 mi) northeast of Woronowo	77♠	23 August 1943	17:02	Pe-2	PQ 35 Ost 60762; 20 km (12 mi) northeast of Kharkov
37♠	4 August 1943	12:01	La-5	PQ 35 Ost 54693; 15 km (9.3 mi) south-southwest of Bolkhov	78♠	23 August 1943	17:04	Pe-2	PQ 35 Ost 61813; 20 km (12 mi) southwest of Vovchansk
38♠	4 August 1943	12:06	Il-2	PQ 35 Ost 54522; 40 km (25 mi) north-northeast of Karachev	79♠	23 August 1943	17:06	Il-2	PQ 35 Ost 61744; 20 km (12 mi) south-southeast of Zolochiv
39♠	4 August 1943	15:33	Il-2	PQ 35 Ost 54573; 20 km (12 mi) north-northeast of Karachev	80	21 September 1943	13:32	Il-2	PQ 35 Ost 12461
40♠	4 August 1943	18:20	LaGG-3	PQ 35 Ost 44571; 20 km (12 mi) north-northeast of Karachev	81	21 September 1943	13:34	Il-2	PQ 35 Ost 12463
41	6 August 1943	12:20? (Note: According to Mathews and Foreman claimed at 12:24.)	Il-2	PQ 35 Ost 44663; 25 km (16 mi) north-northwest of Karachev	82	22 September 1943	14:42	Il-2? (Note: According to Mathews and Foreman claimed as a Lavochkin-Gorbunov-Gudkov LaGG-3.)	PQ 35 Ost 12483
42	6 August 1943	12:56	La-5	PQ 35 Ost 54591; 30 km (19 mi) northeast of Karachev	83	26 September 1943	09:59	P-39	PQ 35 Ost 15667; 30 km (19 mi) west of Schatalowka
43	7 August 1943	08:53	Yak-9	PQ 35 Ost 54594; 30 km (19 mi) northeast of Karachev					
– 9. Staffel of Jagdgeschwader 54 – Defense of the Reich — December 1943 – 6 March 1944
84	20 December 1943	12:04	B-17	PQ 05 Ost S/DS vicinity of Bremen	85?	11 January 1944	11:30	B-17	

=== Awards ===
- Iron Cross (1939) 2nd and 1st Class
- Honor Goblet of the Luftwaffe on 20 September 1943 as Leutnant and pilot
- German Cross in Gold on 17 October 1943 as Leutnant in the 1./Jagdgeschwader 54
- Knight's Cross of the Iron Cross on 5 February 1944 as Leutnant and Staffelführer of the 8./Jagdgeschwader 54 (Note: According to Scherzer as pilot in the 1./Jagdgeschwader 54.)
