= Khutor =

Large homesteads in Eastern European agrarian societies

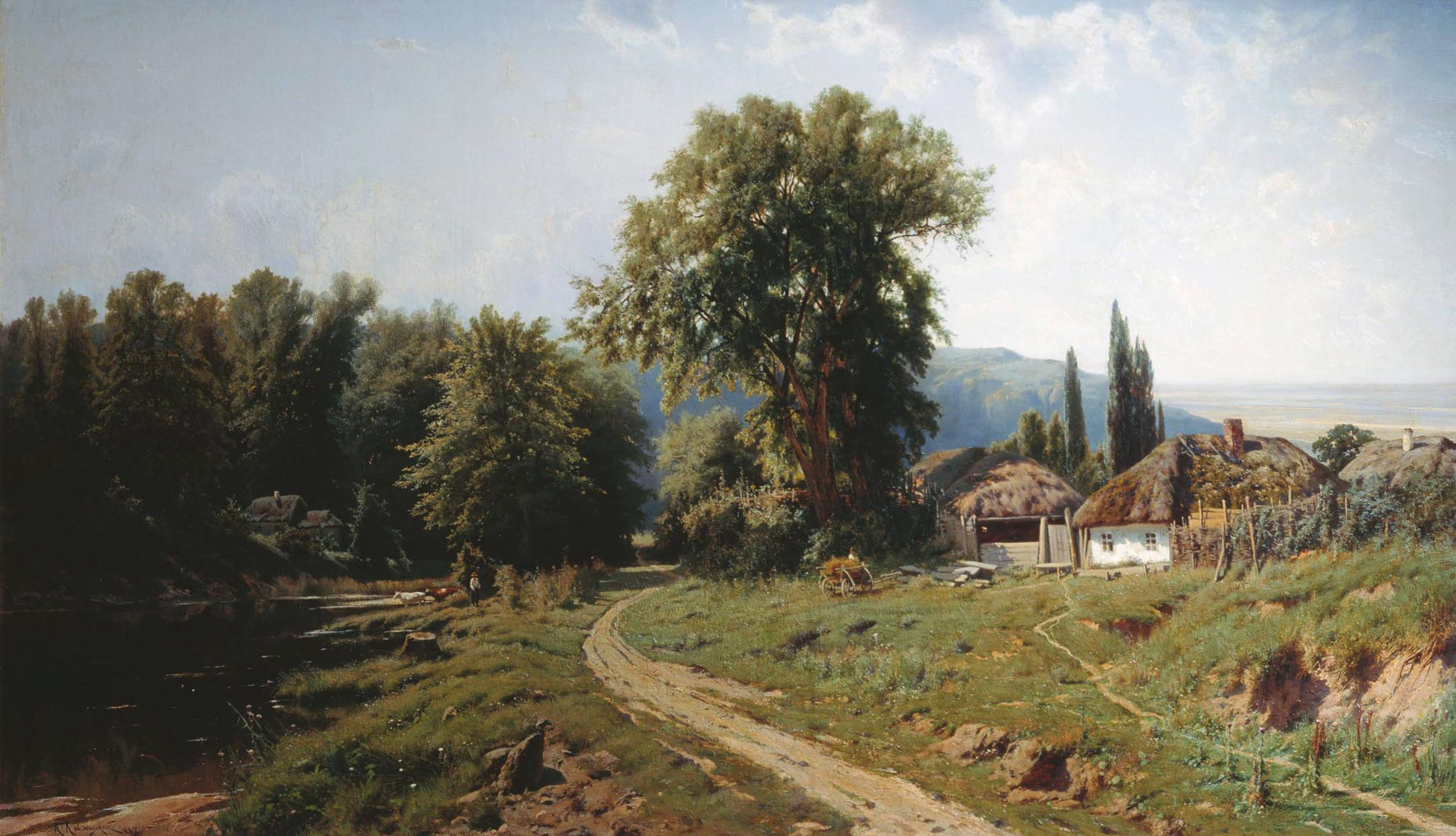
Konstantin Kryzhitsky. A Khutir in Little Russia, 1884

A khutor (/ˈxuːtər/ KHOO-tər; Russian: хутор, IPA: [ˈxutər]) or khutir (Ukrainian: хутiр, IPA: [ˈxut⁽ʲ⁾ir]) is a type of rural locality in some countries of Eastern Europe; in the past the term mostly referred to a single-homestead settlement. The term can be translated as "hamlet".

== Linguistic origin ==
The origin of the word is not entirely clear. Assumed are borrowings from Hungarian határ (lit. "border"), to which the Slavs are reduced, or határ ("border, edge") — from Serbo-Croatian; also from Proto-Iranic khȁtȃr (lit. "land belonging to the village") to Ukrainian as khotar.

According to Max Vasmer, the word entered the East Slavic languages from Old Upper German.

== Definition ==
They existed in Cossack-settled lands that encompassed today's Ukraine, Kuban, and the lower Don River basin while. In Kuban and Don region the word khutor was also used to describe new settlements (irrespective of the number of homesteads) which had detached themselves from stanitsas. In lands of the Zaporozhian Sich, the term zymivnyk (Ukrainian: зимівник) or zymovnyk (Ukrainian: зимовник), literary "wintering quarters", was used for family homesteads established by married Cossacks outside of the sich proper, sometimes interchangeably with the broader definition of khutir. In some Cossack communities, these types of settlements were also referred to as posyolok (Russian: посёлок) or selyshche (Ukrainian: селище). In Russia the term "выселки" (vyselki, literally, "those who moved away") was also used. Khutor remains the official designation of many Russian villages in historical Cossack regions.

During the Stolypin reforms in the Russian empire, Peter Stolypin envisaged rich peasants "privatising" their share of the community (obshchina (Russian: община) or tovarystvo (Ukrainian: товариство)) lands, leaving the obshchinas, and settling in khutors on their now individually owned land. A less radical concept was that of an otrub (Russian: отруб) or vidrub (Ukrainian: відруб): a section of formerly obshchina land, whose owner has left the obshchina but still continued to live in the village and to "commute" to his land. By 1910 the share of khutors and otrubs among all rural households in the European part of Russia was estimated at 10.5%. These were practically eliminated during the collectivisation in the USSR.

== In literature ==
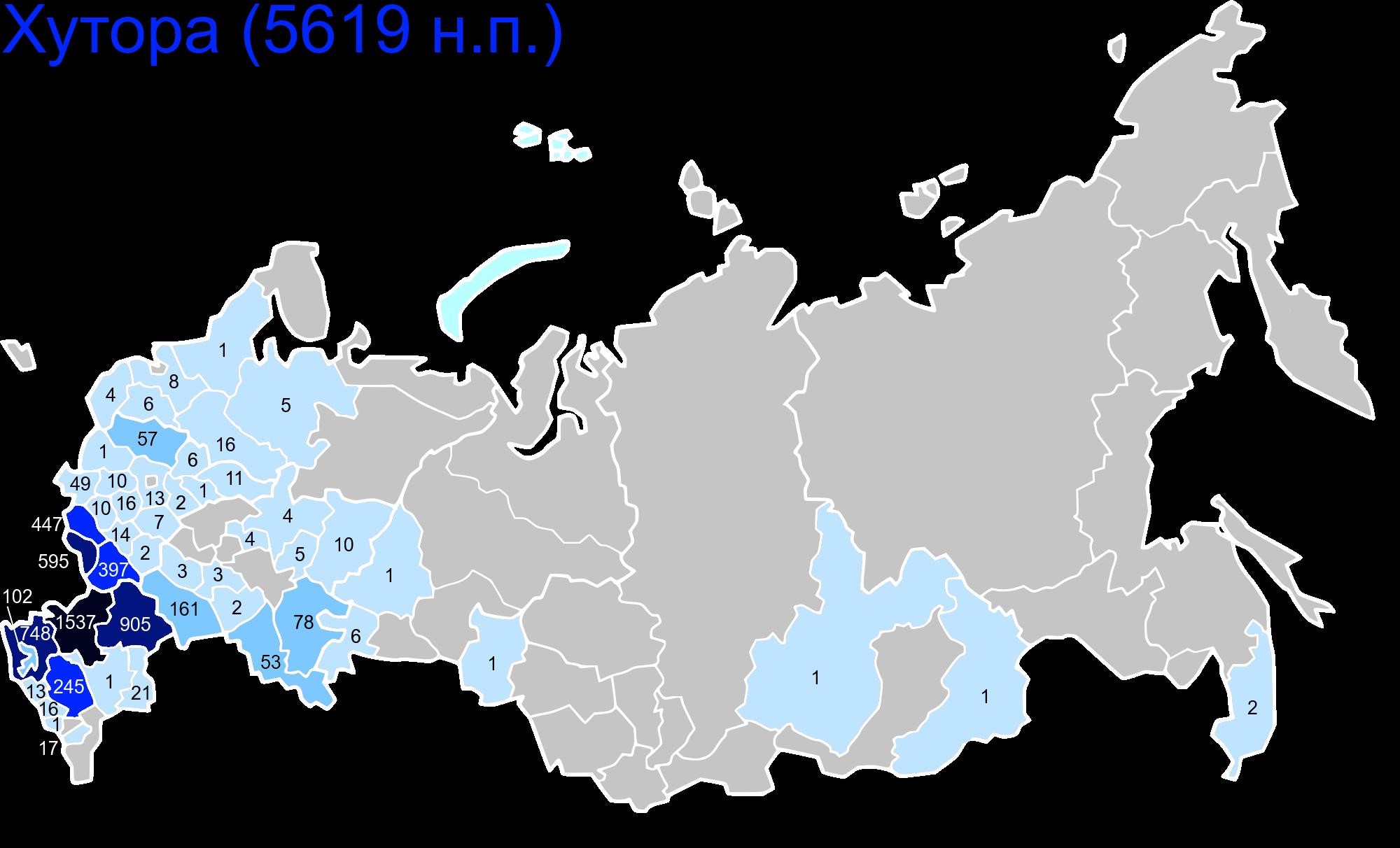
Number of khutors by region in Russia

Nikolai Gogol's first major work is called Evenings on a Farm Near Dikanka, where "farm" is a translation of "khutor" (Russian: Вечера на хуторе близ Диканьки, Vechera na khutore bliz Dikanki).

== See also ==
- Obște
- Pochinok
- Ranch
