= Wilhelm Schilling =

German World War II fighter pilot (1915–2000)

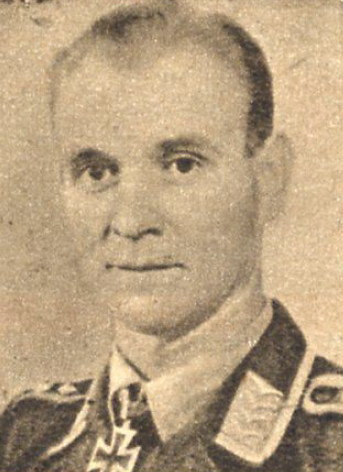
- Schilling as an Oberfeldwebel
- Born: 30 January 1915; Kamenz, Lower Silesia, Germany (now Poland)
- Died: 14 March 2000 (aged 85); Ascheberg, Germany
- Military career
- Allegiance: Nazi Germany
- Branch: Luftwaffe
- Service years: 1939–1945
- Rank: Oberleutnant (first lieutenant)
- Unit: JG 54
- Conflicts: World War II: Eastern Front; Western Front; Battle of France; Battle of Britain; Operation Barbarossa; Defence of the Reich
- Awards: Knight's Cross of the Iron Cross

Wilhelm Schilling (30 January 1915 – 14 March 2000) was a Luftwaffe fighter ace and recipient of the Knight's Cross of the Iron Cross during World War II. The Knight's Cross of the Iron Cross, and its variants were the highest awards in the military and paramilitary forces of Nazi Germany during World War II. For the fighter pilots, it was a measure of skill and combat success. He was credited with at least 50 victories in 538 missions.

== Career ==
Upon finishing flight training, Wilhelm Schilling joined 3./JG 21 as an Unteroffizier. He gained his first victory during the Battle of France, shooting down a Hurricane fighter on 12 May 1940 over Brussels.

On 22 June 1940, I. Gruppe of Jagdgeschwader 21 (JG 21–21st Fighter Wing) was withdrawn from France and moved to München Gladbach, present-day Mönchengladbach. The following day the Gruppe was ordered to Soesterberg in the Netherlands. On 2 July, the unit moved to Bergen op Zoom. Three days later, I. Gruppe of JG 21 was renamed and became the III. Gruppe of Jagdgeschwader 54 (JG 54–54th Fighter Wing).

In the ensuing Battle of Britain, he added three more victories: a Spitfire on 12 August 1940, another on 5 September near Ashford, and a Bristol Blenheim bomber over the North Sea on 8 November.

The unit was then transferred to the Balkans and Bucharest, before going to the Eastern Front to prepare for Operation Barbarossa. His first victory of the campaign was on the second day, 23 June 1941, when he shot down a Russian SB-2 bomber. III./JG 54 was based in the north covering the advance to, and siege of, Leningrad. By the end of the year, he had 17 victories. He hadn't advanced his score by 14 February 1942, when he was seriously wounded by Russian ground fire. Returning to the Leningrad Front in March 1942, he was awarded the Ehrenpokal (Goblet of Honour) on 1 July and the German Cross in Gold on 4 August. On 16 September, Schilling was wounded when his Messerschmitt Bf 109 G-2 (Werknummer 10436—factory number) was hit by anti-aircraft fire. Despite his injuries, he managed to land safely at Dubrovka. Alternatively, Schilling may have been shot down by either Kapitan Dmitriy Zosimov or Starshiy Leytenant Boris Sushkin from 21 IAP (Istrebitelny Aviatsionny Polk—Истребительный Авиационный Полк or Fighter Aviation Regiment). Both pilots had claimed a Bf 109 shot down on a fighter escort mission for Ilyushin Il-2 ground-attack aircraft. While recovering from his injuries, Schilling was awarded the Knight's Cross of the Iron Cross (Ritterkreuz des Eisernen Kreuzes) on 10 October for his 46 victories at the time.

=== Defense of the Reich and squadron leader ===
In February 1943, III. Gruppe was withdrawn from the Eastern Front to defense of the Reich duties, in a misguided attempt to rotate the fighter units between west and east. But for the pilots of III./JG 54, used to low-level combats, being thrown in against the United States Army Air Forces (USAAF) four-engined bombers at high altitude it was a disaster. In its first two missions the unit lost 15 planes and some of its best pilots. However, they persisted and things gradually improved. Now commissioned as an officer, on 1 August Schilling was promoted to Oberleutnant. In September, Schilling was appointed Staffelkapitän (squadron leader) of 9. Staffel of JG 54. He succeeded Hauptmann Hans-Ekkehard Bob who was transferred.

On 20 February 1944, the 8th Air Force started its Big Week against the Reich's industry. By now Schilling had added a further four victories, including three four-engined bombers. During the week III./JG 54 was heavily engaged, suffering considerable losses but inflicting only light damage on the bomber formations. On February 20, he was injured over Deensen/Alfeld while flying Bf 109 G-6 "Yellow 1" (Werknummer 440141) but made a successful forced landing which destroyed the aircraft. On 8 April, Schilling was transferred back to the Eastern Front. Command of 9. Staffel was thus passed on to Oberleutnant Gerhard Loos.

=== Eastern Front ===
On the Eastern Front, Schilling succeeded Oberleutnant Emil Lang on 9 April 1944 as Staffelkapitän of 5. Staffel of JG 54. With the siege of Leningrad finally lifted, they were now based in Estonia. In June II./JG 54 was transferred across to Finland as combat support over the Karelian isthmus as the Soviets launched an attack to try and knock Finland out of the war. By July, they were back in Estonia with intense air activity, as another Soviet offensive aimed to turn the flanks of Army Group North on either end of Lake Peipus. Then, on 22 August, he was finally transferred back to the Reich, as a fighter-instructor in 1./Ergänzungs-Jagdgruppe Ost (renamed 1./ErgJG Nord on 1 September. On 15 January 1945 he was made Staffelkapitän of the training unit 4./EJG 1,(renamed 10./EJG 1 in April 1945) where he served till the war's end.

Wilhelm Schilling was credited with 50 victories (plus 13 more unconfirmed) in 538 missions, 41 of them on the Eastern Front.

== Later life ==
Schilling died on 14 March 2000 at the age of 85 in Ascheberg near Kiel, Germany.

== Summary of career ==
=== Aerial victory claims ===
According to US historian David T. Zabecki, Schilling was credited with 63 aerial victories. Obermaier also lists him with 63 aerial victories, of which eight were claimed over the Western Allies, including three heavy bombers, logging 538 combat missions. Mathews and Foreman, authors of Luftwaffe Aces — Biographies and Victory Claims, researched the German Federal Archives and state that he claimed at least 47 aerial victories. This number includes at least 42 claims on the Eastern Front and five over the Western Allies, including one four-engined heavy bomber.

Victory claims were logged to a map-reference (PQ = Planquadrat), for example "PQ 10191". The Luftwaffe grid map (Jägermeldenetz) covered all of Europe, western Russia and North Africa and was composed of rectangles measuring 15 minutes of latitude by 30 minutes of longitude, an area of about 360 square miles (930 km^{2}). These sectors were then subdivided into 36 smaller units to give a location area 3 km × 4 km (1.9 mi × 2.5 mi) in size.

Chronicle of aerial victories
This and the – (dash) indicates unconfirmed aerial victory claims for which Schilling did not receive credit. This and the ? (question mark) indicates information discrepancies listed by Prien, Stemmer, Rodeike, Bock, Mathews and Foreman.
Claim	Date	Time	Type	Location	Claim	Date	Time	Type	Location
– 3. Staffel of Jagdgeschwader 21 – Battle of France — 10 May – 25 June 1940
1	12 May 1940	10:05	Hurricane	Brussels					
– 9. Staffel of Jagdgeschwader 54 – Action at the Channel and over England — 26 June 1940 – 29 March 1941
2	12 August 1940	18:36	Spitfire? (Note: According to Mathews and Foreman claimed as a Hawker Hurricane.)		4	8 November 1940	09:50	Blenheim	25 km (16 mi) west of Bergen aan Zee
3	5 September 1940	10:49	Spitfire?						
– 9. Staffel of Jagdgeschwader 54 – Operation Barbarossa — 22 June – 5 December 1941
5	23 June 1941	11:50	SB-2		12	29 September 1941	18:15	I-18 (MiG-1)	
6	11 July 1941	15:30	I-18 (MiG-1)		13	7 October 1941	15:15	I-18 (MiG-1)	
7	25 August 1941	12:45	I-16		14	11 October 1941	15:33? (Note: According to Mathews and Foreman claimed at 15:35 as an Ilyushin Il-2.)	ground-attack aircraft?	
8	10 September 1941	14:55	I-18 (MiG-1)		15	28 October 1941	12:25	I-26 (Yak-1)	
9	11 September 1941	09:47	I-18 (MiG-1)		— (Note: This unconfirmed claim is not listed by Mathews and Foreman.)	29 October 1941	—	I-26	
10	15 September 1941	15:30	I-15		16	5 November 1941	15:08	I-26 (Yak-1)	Kolpino
11	23 September 1941	15:10? (Note: According to Mathews and Foreman claimed at 13:10.)	I-18 (MiG-1)		17	14 November 1941	15:15	biplane? (Note: According to Mathews and Foreman claimed as an Seversky aircraft.)	
– 9. Staffel of Jagdgeschwader 54 – Eastern Front — 6 December 1941 – 30 April 1942
18	9 March 1942	17:02	P-40		22	29 March 1942	10:15	I-26 (Yak-1)	
19	13 March 1942	09:52	P-40		23	6 April 1942	10:45	P-40	
20	14 March 1942	09:10	I-18 (MiG-1)		24	24 April 1942	13:02	Yak-1	
21	14 March 1942	09:20	I-18 (MiG-1)		25	25 April 1942	14:42? (Note: According to Mathews and Foreman claimed at 14:41.)	P-40	
– 9. Staffel of Jagdgeschwader 54 – Eastern Front — 1 May – 16 September 1942
26	13 May 1942	04:10	P-40		37	31 August 1942	14:40	LaGG-3	PQ 10191, Kilosi
27	28 May 1942	08:58	I-16	PQ 11793; 25 km (16 mi) northeast of Shlisselburg	38	1 September 1942	12:24	LaGG-3? (Note: According to Mathews and Foreman claimed as a Mikoyan-Gurevich MiG-3.)	PQ 10191, Kilosi
28	10 June 1942	09:38	MiG-3		39	2 September 1942	05:18	MiG-3	PQ 10241; 25 km (16 mi) east-southeast of Shlisselburg
29	14 June 1942	17:40	P-40		40	3 September 1942	04:55	Il-2	PQ 10191, Kilosi
30	20 June 1942	19:07	P-40		41	6 September 1942	09:59	P-40	PQ 10144 south of Shlisselburg
31	22 June 1942	20:05? (Note: According to Mathews and Foreman claimed at 20:02.)	Yak-1		42	9 September 1942	17:35	Il-2	PQ 10151 southeast of Shlisselburg
32	26 June 1942	16:35? (Note: According to Mathews and Foreman claimed at 16:55.)	Yak-1		43	10 September 1942	11:08	Il-2	PQ 10173 vicinity of Mga
33	22 August 1942	13:02	MiG-3	PQ 38313; 30 km (19 mi) south-southwest of Waldai	44	11 September 1942	07:30	MiG-3	PQ 00264; 10 km (6.2 mi) southwest of Shlisselburg
34	27 August 1942	16:43	MiG-3	PQ 10113 vicinity of Shlisselburg	45	11 September 1942	11:50	MiG-3	PQ 00264; 10 km (6.2 mi) southwest of Shlisselburg
35	28 August 1942	14:05	MiG-3	PQ 10184, Gaitolowo east of Mga	46	12 September 1942	06:24	Pe-2	PQ 00251; 15 km (9.3 mi) west-southwest of Shlisselburg
36	31 August 1942	05:15	MiG-3	PQ 10223; 30 km (19 mi) west of Volkhov					
– 9. Staffel of Jagdgeschwader 54 – Defense of the Reich — September 1943 – 8 April 1944
According to Prien, Balke, Stemmer, and Bock, Schilling claimed two aerial victories in January 1944, most likely one each on 5 and 11 January. These two claims are not listed by Mathews and Foreman.
49	24 February 1944	15:20	B-17	PQ 15 Ost DU 4-5 northwest of Regensburg					

=== Awards ===
- Iron Cross (1939) 2nd and 1st Class
- Honor Goblet of the Luftwaffe on 1 July 1942 as Oberfeldwebel and pilot
- German Cross in Gold on 4 August 1942 as Oberfeldwebel in the III./Jagdgeschwader 54
- Knight's Cross of the Iron Cross on 10 October 1942 as Oberfeldwebel and pilot in the 9./Jagdgeschwader 54 (Note: According to Scherzer on 3 November 1942 as pilot in the III./Jagdgeschwader 54.)
