= Emil Lang =

German fighter ace and Knight's Cross recipient (1909–1944)

- Lang as an officer
- Born: 14 January 1909; Thalheim, Kingdom of Bavaria, German Empire
- Died: 3 September 1944 (aged 35) near Overhespen, German-occupied Belgium
- Cause of death: Killed in action
- Burial place: Lommel, Belgium
- Military career
- Allegiance: Nazi Germany
- Branch: Luftwaffe
- Service years: 1938–1944
- Rank: Hauptmann (captain)
- Nickname: "Bully"
- Units: KG 51, JG 54, JG 26
- Commands: 5./JG 54, 9./JG 54, II./JG 26
- Conflicts: See battles World War II: Eastern Front; Defense of the Reich †
- Awards: Knight's Cross of the Iron Cross with Oak Leaves

Emil Lang (14 January 1909 – 3 September 1944), nicknamed "Bully", was a Luftwaffe flying ace during World War II. Lang was credited with 173 aerial victories—144 on the Eastern Front, 29 on the Western Front—and one Soviet MTB sunk in 403 combat missions.

Posted to a fighter wing on the Eastern Front, Lang claimed his first aerial victories in March 1943. He was credited with 72 victories in a three-week period, among them an unsurpassed total of 18 on 3 November 1943. He received the Knight's Cross of the Iron Cross on 22 November 1943 for his 119 victories to that time. By March 1944, his claims totaled 144, for which he received the Knight's Cross of the Iron Cross with Oak Leaves on 11 April 1944. Transferred to the Western Front, he claimed his 150th victim during the Normandy Invasion on 14 June 1944. He scored his last three victories on 26 August 1944; on 3 September 1944, he was killed in action over Belgium.

== Early life and career ==
Lang was born on 14 January 1909 at Thalheim, now part of Fraunberg in the Isar region near Freising in Bavaria, Germany. He was a well-known track-and-field athlete who ran the middle distances. Prior to World War II, he qualified as a civil pilot and flew with Deutsche Luft Hansa. Lang earned the nickname "Bully" from his 'bulldog-like' looks, characterized by his barrel-chested physique. He joined the Luftwaffe as a member of the military reserve force on 4 January 1938. From 8 May to 3 June 1939, he served with 8. Staffel (8th squadron) of Kampfgeschwader 51 (KG 51—51st Bomber Wing). On 26 August 1939, he was put on active duty.

== World War II ==
World War II in Europe began on Friday 1 September 1939 when German forces invaded Poland. Following the outbreak of war, Lang served as a transport pilot with the Fliegerhorst Kompanie (Airfield Company) at Gablingen, flying missions to Norway, France, Crete and North Africa. On 1 November 1941, he was promoted to Leutnant (second lieutenant).

Lang was 33 years old when he was accepted for fighter pilot training in 1942. He undertook courses at the Jagdflieger Vorschule 1 (1st Fighter Pilot Preparation School) (3 July 1942 – 14 August 1942) and Jagdfliegerschule 5 (5th Fighter Pilot School) (15 August 1942 – 5 January 1943). He was then assigned to Jagdgruppe Ost (Fighter Group East) on 6 January 1943 and then to Jagdgeschwader 54 (JG 54—54th Fighter Wing) on the Eastern Front on 11 February 1943. (Note: For an explanation of Luftwaffe unit designations see Organization of the Luftwaffe during World War II.) Serving with 1./JG 54 (1st Squadron of the 54th Fighter Wing), Leutnant Lang was 34 and considered exceptionally old for a novice fighter pilot. His first three aerial victories were claimed in March 1943, and within a month he was transferred to 5./JG 54 (5th Squadron of the 54th Fighter Wing) of which he became Staffelkapitän (Squadron Leader) on 20 August 1943. Lang had already briefly served as acting Staffelkapitän of 5. Staffel from July to early August before he officially succeeded Oberleutnant Max Stotz in this function after Stotz was reported missing in action on 19 August 1943.

Before the year's end, Lang's kill tally stood at over 100 victories, with a remarkable 72 scored around Kiev in just three weeks during October and November 1943. He was the 58th Luftwaffe pilot to achieve the century mark. This series of multiple victories included ten on 13 October 1943 and 12 (victories 61–72) in three combat missions on 21 October 1943, which earned Lang his first of two references in the Wehrmachtbericht, a bulletin issued by the Oberkommando der Wehrmacht, the Wehrmacht High Command. During the Battle of Kiev, Lang set an all-time world record of 18 aerial victories claimed from four combat missions in one day on 3 November 1943, making him aviation history's leading ace-in-a-day. This achievement led to him appearing on the cover of the 13 January 1944 Berliner Illustrirte Zeitung (Berlin's Illustrated Magazine). Lang was awarded the Knight's Cross of the Iron Cross (Ritterkreuz des Eisernen Kreuzes) after 119 aerial victories on 22 November 1943, followed three days later by the German Cross in Gold (Deutsches Kreuz in Gold). He received the Knight's Cross together with fellow JG 54 pilot Oberleutnant Albin Wolf.

On 9 April 1944, Oberleutnant (First Lieutenant) Lang was appointed Staffelkapitän of the 9./JG 54 (9th Squadron of the 54th Fighter Wing) engaged in Defence of the Reich on the Western Front. He replaced Leutnant Alfred Kromer who was killed on 8 March. Kromer had only led the Staffel for two days after its former commander, Oberleutnant Gerhard Loos, had been killed on 6 March. The Staffel was subordinated to III. Gruppe led by Major Werner Schröer. Command of 5. Staffel was then transferred to Oberleutnant Wilhelm Schilling.

He became the 448th recipient of the Knight's Cross of the Iron Cross with Oak Leaves (Ritterkreuz des Eisernen Kreuzes mit Eichenlaub) on 11 April 1944 after 144 aerial victories, all claimed on the Eastern Front. The presentation was made by Adolf Hitler at the Berghof, Hitler's residence in the Obersalzberg of the Bavarian Alps, on 5 May 1944. Also present at the ceremony were Anton Hafner, Otto Kittel, Günther Schack, Alfred Grislawski, Erich Rudorffer, Martin Möbus, Wilhelm Herget, Hans-Karl Stepp, Rudolf Schoenert, Günther Radusch, Otto Pollmann and Fritz Breithaupt, who all received the Oak Leaves on this date.

=== Western Front ===
When Allied forces launched Operation Overlord, the invasion of German-occupied Western Europe on 6 June, III. Gruppe was immediately ordered to relocate to Villacoublay Airfield. That day, the Gruppe reached Nancy, arriving in Villacoublay the following day where it was subordinated to II. Fliegerkorps (2nd Air Corps). Its primary objective was to fly fighter-bomber missions in support of the German ground forces. The Gruppe flew its first missions on 7 June to the combat area east of Caen and the Orne estuary.

In June, Lang claimed 15 aerial victories, including his 150th—a United States Army Air Forces (USAAF) P-47 Thunderbolt on 14 June 1944—and four P-51 Mustang fighters shot down in four minutes on 20 June 1944, plus another four P-51s on 24 June. Hauptmann (Captain) Lang was then made Gruppenkommandeur (Group Commander) of the II. Gruppe of Jagdgeschwader 26 "Schlageter" (JG 26—2nd Group of the 26th Fighter Wing) on 28 June 1944. He replaced Hauptmann Johannes Naumann who had been injured in aerial combat on 23 June. On 9 July, he claimed three Royal Air Force (RAF) Supermarine Spitfires (victories 160–162)—no Spitfires were shot down this day: American historian Donald Caldwell noted that his claims were exaggerated but asserted Lang's ebullience, energy and drive made him an effective combat leader. On 15 August 1944 two P-47s, and on 25 August 1944 three P-38 Lightning fighters in five minutes. The hard-hit 428th Fighter Squadron, 474th Fighter Group lost 8 P-38s, its worst combat performance. The 429th also lost three P-38s. Not a single Fw 190 was lost. The Bf 109-equipped III. Gruppe of Jagdgeschwader 76 (Fighter Wing 76) were also involved and claimed six P-38s. During the day it lost 21 Bf 109s, three pilots killed and 18 missing.

He claimed three Spitfires in two missions for his final victories (victories 171–173) on 26 August. His victims most likely belonged to 421 and 341 Squadron RAF. Between 24 May and 28 August 1944, Lang had claimed 29 aerial victories on the Western Front, including nine P-51 Mustangs. On 6 June 1944, his group was the first to reach 100 aerial victories over Normandy, earning him and his group a second and final reference in the Wehrmachtbericht on 30 August.

== Death ==
On 3 September 1944, Emil Lang was killed in action when his Fw 190 A-8 (Werknummer 171 240—factory number) "Green 1" hit the ground and exploded in a field at Overhespen. He had experienced mechanical trouble on the runway when he and the other aircraft of his flight took off at Melsbroek at 1.20 pm. Ten minutes later, Lang was still having difficulties raising his landing gear. Flying at an altitude of 200 metres (660 ft), his wingman, Unteroffizier Hans-Joachim Borreck, called out P-47 Thunderbolts to their rear. Lang broke upward, to the left. Leutnant Alfred Groß saw Lang's Fw 190 diving in flames, its gear extended, but he lost sight of Lang when his own craft was hit and he had to bail out. Examination of both German and American records suggests that Borreck and Groß misidentified their opponents. The P-51 Mustangs of the 55th Fighter Group's 338th Squadron intercepted a flight of three to six Focke-Wulfs. Lieutenant Darrell Cramer took a high deflection shot at the Focke-Wulf on the left, which fell upside down in a steep dive and crashed hard into the ground; this undoubtedly was Emil Lang. (Note: According to Andrew Thomas, however, Emil Lang was shot down by Flight Lieutenant Terry Spencer of No. 41 Squadron RAF flying a Spitfire XII from Lympne.)

On 28 September 1944, Lang's commanding officer, Geschwaderkommodore (Wing Commander) Josef Priller, submitted a request for posthumous promotion to Major. In describing Lang's character, Priller said:

Captain Lang is a fully matured character, serious and calm in his demeanor, yet definite and energetic when strength was needed. Very good attitude as an officer. Demands of himself first. He understands how to reach the men under his command correctly. Captain Lang possesses an exemplary concept of service, has initiative and talent for improvisation to a large degree, well rooted in the National Socialist ideas.

The commander of the II. Jagdkorps (2nd Fighter Corps), Generalleutnant (Major General) Alfred Bülowius, concurred with the assessment. Despite these recommendations, Emil Lang did not receive a posthumous promotion to Major. Lang was succeeded by Hauptmann Georg-Peter Eder as commander of II. Gruppe of JG 26.

== Summary of career ==
=== Aerial victory claims ===
According to US historian David T. Zabecki, Lang was credited with 173 aerial victories. Spick also lists him with 173 aerial victories claimed in 403 combat missions, and a mission-to-claim ratio of 2.33. Mathews and Foreman, authors of Luftwaffe Aces — Biographies and Victory Claims, researched the German Federal Archives and found records for 172 aerial victory claims. This number includes 141 aerial victories on the Eastern Front and 31 on the Western Front, including one four-engined bomber.

Victory claims were logged to a map-reference (PQ = Planquadrat), for example "PQ 36 Ost 00333". The Luftwaffe grid map (Jägermeldenetz) covered all of Europe, western Russia and North Africa and was composed of rectangles measuring 15 minutes of latitude by 30 minutes of longitude, an area of about 360 square miles (930 km^{2}). These sectors were then subdivided into 36 smaller units to give a location area 3 km × 4 km (1.9 mi × 2.5 mi) in size.

Chronicle of aerial victories
This and the ♠ (Ace of spades) indicates those aerial victories which made Lang an "ace-in-a-day", a term which designates a fighter pilot who has shot down five or more airplanes in a single day. This and the – (dash) indicates unconfirmed aerial victory claims for which Lang did not receive credit. This and the ! (exclamation mark) indicates those aerial victories listed by Prien, Stemmer, Rodeike and Bock. This and the # (hash mark) indicates those aerial victories listed by Mathews and Foreman. This and the * (asterisk) indicates those aerial victories listed by Caldwell, Prien, Balke, Stemmer and Bock. This and the ? (question mark) indicates information discrepancies listed by Prien, Stemmer, Rodeike, Balke, Bock, Mathews and Foreman.
| Claim! | Claim# | Date | Time | Type | Location | Claim! | Claim# | Date | Time | Type | Location |
– 5. Staffel of Jagdgeschwader 54 –
| 1 | 1 | 23 March 1943 | 11:10 | MiG-3 | PQ 36 Ost 00333 vicinity of Pushkin | 12 | 12 | 30 July 1943 | 08:50 | P-39 | PQ 36 Ost 10194 east of Mga |
| 2 | 2 | 30 May 1943 | 20:19 | P-40 | PQ 36 Ost 10151 southeast of Schlüsselburg | 13 | 13 | 1 August 1943 | 05:20 | P-39 | PQ 36 Ost 10144 south of Schlüsselburg |
| 3 | 3 | 30 May 1943 | 20:26 | P-40 | PQ 36 Ost 10243; 25 km (16 mi) east-southeast of Schlüsselburg | 14 | 14 | 1 August 1943 | 05:28 | P-39 | PQ 36 Ost 10163 southeast of Schlüsselburg |
| 4 | 4 | 13 July 1943 | 09:05 | Il-2 m.H. (Note: The "m.H." refers to an Ilyushin Il-2 with rear gunner (mit Heckschütze).) | PQ 35 Ost 63231; 20 km (12 mi) southwest of Belyov | 15 | 15 | 1 August 1943 | 12:34 | P-39 | PQ 36 Ost 10142 south of Schlüsselburg |
| 5 | 5 | 13 July 1943 | 09:08 | Il-2 m.H.? (Note: According to Mathews and Foreman claimed as an Il-7.) | PQ 35 Ost 63252; 40 km (25 mi) east-southeast of Oryol | 16 | 16 | 1 August 1943 | 12:39 | P-40 | PQ 36 Ost 10172 vicinity of Mga |
| 6 | 6 | 13 July 1943 | 19:05 | La-5 | PQ 35 Ost 64763 | 17 | 17 | 13 September 1943 | 12:48 | Pe-2? (Note: According to Mathews and Foreman claimed as an Ilyushin Il-2.) | PQ 35 Ost 26521; 40 km (25 mi) north of Moschna |
| 7 | 7 | 17 July 1943 | 13:42 | LaGG-3 | PQ 35 Ost 64894; 25 km (16 mi) southeast of Mtsensk | 18 | 18 | 14 September 1943 | 16:40 | Yak-7 | PQ 35 Ost 25693; 25 km (16 mi) east-southeast of Shatalovo |
| 8 | 8 | 17 July 1943 | 13:44 | LaGG-3 | PQ 35 Ost 63221; 40 km (25 mi) east of Oryol | 19 | 19 | 15 September 1943 | 09:10 | P-39 | PQ 35 Ost 25494; 15 km (9.3 mi) west of Yelnya |
| 9 | 9 | 20 July 1943 | 19:05 | P-39 | PQ 35 Ost 64584; 20 km (12 mi) west of Mtsensk | 20 | 20 | 15 September 1943 | 09:15 | Il-2 m.H. | PQ 35 Ost 25492; 15 km (9.3 mi) west of Yelnya |
| 10 | 10 | 20 July 1943 | 19:07 | P-39 | PQ 35 Ost 64594; 10 km (6.2 mi) west of Mtsensk | 21 | 21 | 15 September 1943 | 10:45 | La-5 | PQ 35 Ost 25633; 25 km (16 mi) southwest of Yelnya |
| 11 | 11 | 28 July 1943 | 11:10 | La-5 | PQ 36 Ost 10314; 10 km (6.2 mi) south of Mga | | | | | | |
According to Prien, Stemmer, Rodeike and Bock, II. Gruppe records do not list any victory claims between 18 September and 3 October 1943 although at least 26 aerial victories had been claimed. Among these missing records are Lang's aerial victories 22 to 25, including one claim on 27 September 1943.
| 26 | 22 | 4 October 1943 | 16:07 | LaGG-3 | northeast of Chernobyl | 87♠ | 83 | 23 October 1943 | 15:35 | La-5 | east of Khodoriv |
| 27 | 23 | 5 October 1943 | 16:05 | Yak-9 | south of Gorostaipol | 88 | 84♠ | 24 October 1943 | 14:46 | Yak-7 | northeast of Khodoriv |
| 28♠ | 24 | 7 October 1943 | 11:17 | La-5 | northeast of Gorostaipol | 89 | 85♠ | 24 October 1943 | 14:48 | Yak-7 | northwest of Khodoriv |
| 29♠ | 25 | 7 October 1943 | 11:28 | La-5 | east-northeast of Stracholessje | 90 | 86♠ | 24 October 1943 | 14:49 | Yak-7 | east of Iwankow |
| 30♠ | 26 | 7 October 1943 | 11:31 | La-5 | northeast of Stracholessje | 91 | 87♠ | 24 October 1943 | 14:51 | La-5 | east of Khodoriv east of Iwankow |
| 31♠ | 27 | 7 October 1943 | 14:03 | La-5 | northeast of Stracholessje | | 88♠ | 24 October 1943 | 14:56 | Yak-7 | east of Khodoriv |
| 32♠ | 28 | 7 October 1943 | 14:10 | La-5 | east of Gubin | 92 | 89 | 25 October 1943 | 14:46 | La-5 | north-northeast of Balnowka |
| 33 | 29 | 8 October 1943 | 06:08 | LaGG-3 | northeast of Khodoriv | 93 | 90 | 25 October 1943 | 14:47 | La-5 | northeast of Gussenzow[Gussenzy] |
| 34 | 30 | 8 October 1943 | 06:10 | La-5 | north of Khodoriv | 94♠ | 91 | 2 November 1943 | 15:05 | Yak-7 | west of Voropayevo |
| 35 | 31 | 8 October 1943 | 06:13 | La-5 | northeast of Gussenoye | 95♠ | 92 | 2 November 1943 | 15:06 | Yak-7 | west of Voropayevo |
| 36 | 32 | 9 October 1943 | 12:30 | La-5 | south of Gruschevo | 96♠ | 93 | 2 November 1943 | 15:07 | Yak-9 | east of Lyutezh |
| 37 | 33 | 9 October 1943 | 16:08 | La-5 | north of Gruschevo | 97♠ | 94 | 2 November 1943 | 15:10 | Yak-9 | north of Novosselk |
| 38 | 34 | 9 October 1943 | 16:10 | La-5 | Schtschutschunka | 98♠ | 95 | 2 November 1943 | 15:15 | Yak-9 | northeast of Lyutezh |
| 39 | 35 | 9 October 1943 | 16:15 | LaGG-3 | south of Yashnyky (Note: Yashnyky is approximately 5 km (3.1 mi) north of Lokhvytsia.) | 99♠ | 96 | 2 November 1943 | 15:17 | Yak-9 | east-southeast of Lyutezh |
| 40 | 36 | 10 October 1943 | 06:34 | LaGG-3 | east-northeast of Yashnyky | 100♠ | 97 | 2 November 1943 | 15:18 | Yak-9 | east-southeast of Lyutezh |
| 41 | 37 | 10 October 1943 | 06:38 | LaGG-3 | northeast of Yashnyky | 101♠ | 98 | 2 November 1943 | 15:19 | Yak-9 | west of Saimje |
| 42 | 38 | 10 October 1943 | 16:12 | La-5 | east of Ljutesh | 102♠ | 99 | 3 November 1943 | 09:31 | Il-2 | northeast of Lyutezh |
| 43 | 39 | 11 October 1943 | 06:10 | P-40 | east of Stracholessje | 103♠ | 100 | 3 November 1943 | 09:32 | Il-2 | north-northeast of Lyutezh |
| 44 | 40 | 11 October 1943 | 16:01 | La-5 | west of Yashnyky | 104♠ | 101 | 3 November 1943 | 09:33 | Il-2 | northeast of Kastarowitschi |
| 45 | 41 | 11 October 1943 | 16:02 | La-5 | west of Yashnyky | 105♠ | 102 | 3 November 1943 | 09:35 | Yak-7 | northeast of Kastarowitschi |
| 46 | 42 | 11 October 1943 | 16:03 | La-5 | west of Yashnyky | 106♠ | 103 | 3 November 1943 | 09:36 | Il-2 | northwest of Glebovka |
| 47 | 43 | 12 October 1943 | 09:02 | Pe-2 | north of Gorostaipol | 107♠ | 104 | 3 November 1943 | 09:40 | Yak-7 | east-northeast of Glebovka |
| 48 | 44 | 12 October 1943 | 10:47 | Il-2 | east of Gruschewo | 108♠ | 105 | 3 November 1943 | 09:42 | Yak-7 | east-northeast of Glebovka |
| 49 | 45 | 12 October 1943 | 10:50 | La-5 | west of Grigorovka | 109♠ | 106 | 3 November 1943 | 13:00 | La-5 | east-northeast of Blistawizd |
| 50 | 46 | 12 October 1943 | 10:52 | La-5 | Dnieper River | 110♠ | 107 | 3 November 1943 | 14:15 | Il-2 | east of Moschtschum |
| 51♠ | 47 | 13 October 1943 | 05:50 | La-5 | northwest of Tschozki | 111♠ | 108 | 3 November 1943 | 14:16 | Il-2 | north of Moschtschum |
| 52♠ | 48 | 13 October 1943 | 05:52 | La-5 | south of Sarubenzojezy | 112♠ | | 3 November 1943 | 14:17 | Il-2 | north of Vyshgorod |
| 53♠ | 49 | 13 October 1943 | 05:58 | La-5 | south of Grigorovka | 113♠ | 109 | 3 November 1943 | 14:20 | La-5 | northwest of Vyshgorod |
| 54♠ | 50 | 13 October 1943 | 06:03 | La-5 | southwest of Sarubenzy | 114♠ | 110 | 3 November 1943 | 14:22 | La-5 | north of Kiev |
| 55♠ | 51 | 13 October 1943 | 06:05 | Yak-7 | north of Trachhtemirow | 115♠ | 111 | 3 November 1943 | 14:23 | Il-2 | west of Valki |
| 56♠ | 52 | 13 October 1943 | 06:08 | Yak-7 | north-northwest of Grigorovka | 116♠ | 112 | 3 November 1943 | 14:45 | Yak-9 | east of Gostomel |
| 57♠ | 53 | 13 October 1943 | 09:31 | La-5 | west of Trachhtemirow | 117♠ | 113 | 3 November 1943 | 14:46 | Yak-9 | west of Vyshgorod |
| 58♠ | 54 | 13 October 1943 | 09:35 | La-5 | southeast of Grigorovka | 118♠ | 114 | 3 November 1943 | 14:48 | Il-2 | east of Gostomel |
| 59♠ | 55 | 13 October 1943 | 09:40 | Yak-7 | south of Grigorovka | 119♠ | 115 | 3 November 1943 | 14:49 | Il-2 | north of Mostischtsche |
| 60♠ | 56 | 13 October 1943 | 15:55 | Yak-7 | north of Yashnyky | | 116 | 4 November 1943 | 14:17 | Il-2 | north of Vyshgorod |
| 61♠ | 57 | 21 October 1943 | 09:32 | La-5 | southwest of Grigorovka | 120 | 117 | 28 November 1943 | 12:26 | Il-2 | east of Kotscherewo |
| 62♠ | 58 | 21 October 1943 | 09:34 | La-5 | northwest of Grigorovka | 121 | 118 | 29 November 1943 | 07:29 | La-5 | west of Mestetschko |
| 63♠ | 59 | 21 October 1943 | 09:37 | Yak-7 | southeast of Yashnyky | 122 | 119 | 29 November 1943 | 10:32 | Yak-9 | south of Wnysokoye |
| 64♠ | 60 | 21 October 1943 | 09:38 | Yak-7 | south-southeast of Yashnyky | 123 | 120 | 29 November 1943 | 10:34 | Il-2 | northwest of Wnysokoye |
| 65♠ | 61 | 21 October 1943 | 09:41 | Il-2 | northwest of Rshischtschew | 124 | 121 | 30 November 1943 | 11:48 | Il-2 | north of Nebryliza |
| 66♠ | 62 | 21 October 1943 | 12:10 | Yak-9 | south of Tschernischewa | 125 | 122 | 30 November 1943 | 11:49 | Il-2 | PQ 25 Ost 91562; 20 km (12 mi) north-northwest of Zelenogorst |
| 67♠ | 63 | 21 October 1943 | 12:11 | Yak-9 | south of Grigorovka | 126 | 123 | 13 December 1943 | 11:25 | La-5 | Nebryliza |
| 68♠ | 64 | 21 October 1943 | 12:13 | Yak-7 | south of Trachtemirow | 127 | 124 | 15 January 1944 | 11:55 | La-5 | PQ 25 Ost 99114; 15 km (9.3 mi) east of Lake Samara |
| 69♠ | 65 | 21 October 1943 | 12:13 | Yak-7 | north of Gruschewo | 128 | 125 | 15 January 1944 | 11:56 | La-5 | PQ 25 Ost 99123; 25 km (16 mi) east of Lake Samara |
| 70♠ | 66 | 21 October 1943 | 14:46 | Yak-7 | southwest of Lassurzow | 129 | 126 | 25 March 1944 | 08:04 | Yak-9 | PQ 25 Ost 78451; 40 km (25 mi) west of Selo |
| 71♠ | 67 | 21 October 1943 | 14:48 | Yak-7 | southeast of Tschernishow | 130 | 127 | 25 March 1944 | 08:05 | Yak-9 | PQ 25 Ost 78423; 40 km (25 mi) west-northwest of Selo |
| 72♠ | 68 | 21 October 1943 | 14:49 | Yak-9 | southwest of Dobriza | | 128 | 25 March 1944 | 08:12 | Yak-9 | Lake Peipus, 20 km (12 mi) northwest of Pskov |
| 73♠ | 69 | 22 October 1943 | 06:20 | La-5 | south of Yashnyky | 131 | 129 | 26 March 1944 | 10:20 | Yak-9 | PQ 25 Ost 70663; 10 km (6.2 mi) west-southwest of Hungerburg |
| 74♠ | 70 | 22 October 1943 | 06:22 | La-5 | southwest of Yashnyky | 132 | 130 | 26 March 1944 | 13:40 | P-40 | PQ 26 Ost 70692; 15 km (9.3 mi) southwest of Narva |
| 75♠ | 71 | 22 October 1943 | 06:27 | La-5 | east of Gruschewo | 133 | 131 | 26 March 1944 | 13:41 | P-40 | PQ 26 Ost 70692; 15 km (9.3 mi) southwest of Narva |
| 76♠ | 72 | 22 October 1943 | 06:30 | La-5 | east of Jeu | 134 | 132 | 1 April 1944 | 14:20 | Yak-9 | PQ 25 Ost 88324; 10 km (6.2 mi) south of Pskov |
| 77♠ | 73 | 22 October 1943 | 06:34 | La-5 | south of Tschernischew | 135 | 133 | 2 April 1944 | 11:15 | Il-2 | PQ 25 Ost 88351 vicinity of Selo |
| 78♠ | 74 | 22 October 1943 | 12:10 | Yak-9 | north of Yashnyky | 136 | 134 | 2 April 1944 | 13:40? (Note: According to Mathews and Foreman claimed at 13:45.) | Yak-9 | PQ 25 Ost 88551 east of Ostrov |
| 79♠ | 75 | 22 October 1943 | 12:11 | Yak-9 | east of Yashnyky | 137 | 135 | 2 April 1944 | 13:45? (Note: According to Mathews and Foreman claimed at 13:46.) | Yak-9 | PQ 25 Ost 88523; 15 km (9.3 mi) northwest of Ostrov |
| 80♠ | 76 | 22 October 1943 | 12:16 | Yak-7 | south-southeast of Yashnyky | 138 | 136 | 3 April 1944 | 11:17? (Note: According to Mathews and Foreman claimed at 11:07.) | Yak-9 | PQ 25 Ost 88362; 20 km (12 mi) southwest of Selo |
| 81♠ | 77 | 22 October 1943 | 12:18 | La-5 | west-southwest of Yashnyky | 139 | 137 | 4 April 1944 | 11:42 | Il-2 | PQ 25 Ost 88359 vicinity of Selo |
| 82♠ | 78 | 23 October 1943 | 15:12 | Yak-9 | south of Grigorovka | 140 | 138 | 4 April 1944 | 11:43 | Yak-9 | PQ 25 Ost 88356 vicinity of Selo |
| 83♠ | 79 | 23 October 1943 | 15:14 | Yak-9 | east of Gruschewo | 141 | 139 | 4 April 1944 | 16:04? (Note: According to Mathews and Foreman claimed at 16:06.) | Yak-9 | PQ 25 Ost 88352; 20 km (12 mi) southwest of Selo |
| 84♠ | 80 | 23 October 1943 | 15:15 | Yak-9 | north-northeast of Yashnyky | 142 | 140 | 4 April 1944 | 16:08 | Yak-9 | PQ 25 Ost 88359 vicinity of Selo |
| 85♠ | 81 | 23 October 1943 | 15:20 | Yak-7 | village edge of Romaschki | 143 | 141 | 6 April 1944 | 07:15 | La-5 | PQ 25 Ost 88355 vicinity of Selo |
| 86♠ | 82 | 23 October 1943 | 15:22 | La-5 | east of Rshitschtschew | | | | | | |
– 9. Staffel of Jagdgeschwader 54 –
| 144 | 142 | 24 May 1944 | 11:42 | B-17 | PQ 15 Ost EG 6-9; Oranienburg | 153 | 151 | 20 June 1944 | 16:20 | P-51 | PQ 04 Ost N/AC-4 west of Saint-André-de-l'Eure |
| 145 | 143 | 28 May 1944 | 14:23 | P-38 | PQ 15 Ost FD 9 Tangermünde | 154 | 152 | 20 June 1944 | 16:21 | P-51 | PQ 04 Ost N/AB-6 north of Breuteuil |
| 146 | 144 | 8 June 1944 | 16:49 | P-51 | PQ 05 Ost S/UB-4; 5 km (3.1 mi) northwest of Bernay | 155 | 153 | 24 June 1944 | 07:18 | P-51 | PQ 05 Ost S/UC-7/8; Évreux |
| 147 | 145 | 11 June 1944 | 10:53 | Lysander | northeast of Caen | 156 | 154 | 24 June 1944 | 07:19 | P-51 | PQ 05 Ost S/UC-7/8; Évreux |
| 148 | 146 | 14 June 1944 | 07:29 | P-47 | PQ 04 Ost N/AC-3; Pacy-sur-Eure/Évreux | 157 | 155 | 24 June 1944 | 07:21 | P-51 | PQ 05 Ost S/UC-7/8; Évreux |
| 149 | 147 | 14 June 1944 | 07:31 | P-47 | PQ 04 Ost N/AC-6 east of Saint-André-de-l'Eure | 158 | 156 | 24 June 1944 | 07:22 | P-51 | PQ 05 Ost S/UC-7/8; Évreux |
| 150 | 148 | 14 June 1944 | 07:32 | P-47 | PQ 04 Ost N/AC-4; Ivry-la-Bataille/Dreux | 159 | 157 | 26 June 1944 | 11:03 | Spitfire | PQ 05 Ost S/UB-9/2 southeast of Bernay |
| 151 | 149 | 20 June 1944 | 16:17 | P-51 | PQ 04 Ost N/AC-5; Saint-André-de-l'Eure | | 158 | 30 June 1944 | 06:50 | unknown | |
| 152 | 150 | 20 June 1944 | 16:18 | P-51 | PQ 04 Ost N/AC-4; Saint-André-de-l'Eure | | | | | | |
| Claim* | Claim# | Date | Time | Type | Location | Claim* | Claim# | Date | Time | Type | Location |
– Stab II. Gruppe of Jagdgeschwader 26 –
| 160 | 159 | 9 July 1944 | 13:19 | Spitfire | PQ 15 West UU/PQ 05 Ost UA; Caen | 167 | 166 | 23 August 1944 | 13:40 | Spitfire | PQ 05 Ost UE north of Paris |
| 161 | 160 | 9 July 1944 | 13:21 | Spitfire | PQ 15 West UU/PQ 05 Ost UA; Caen | 168 | 167 | 25 August 1944 | 13:43 | P-38 | PQ 05 Ost TD west of Beauvais |
| 162 | 161 | 9 July 1944 | 13:24 | Spitfire | PQ 15 West UU/PQ 05 Ost UA; Caen | 169 | 168 | 25 August 1944 | 13:45 | P-38 | PQ 05 Ost UD east of Vernon |
| 163 | 162 | 15 August 1944 | 12:31 | P-47 | Rambouillet | 170 | 169 | 25 August 1944 | 13:48 | P-38 | PQ 05 Ost TD west of Beauvais |
| 164 | 163 | 15 August 1944 | 12:32 | P-47 | Rambouillet | 171 | 170 | 26 August 1944 | 09:17 | Spitfire | PQ 05 Ost SD-7 east of Neufchâtel-en-Bray |
| 165 | 164 | 19 August 1944 | 10:24 | P-47 | east of Vernon | 172 | 171 | 26 August 1944 | 09:19 | Spitfire | PQ 05 Ost TC-3; Rouen |
| 166 | 165 | 23 August 1944 | 13:38 | Spitfire | PQ 05 Ost UE/UF northeast of Paris | 173 | 172 | 26 August 1944 | 14:28 | Spitfire | PQ 05 Ost TD-1 east of Rouen |

=== Awards ===
- War Merit Cross 2nd Class with Swords (24 October 1940)
- Front Flying Clasp of the Luftwaffe for Fighter Pilots
  - in Bronze (23 March 1943)
  - Silver (14 May 1943)
  - Gold (25 June 1943)
- Honor Goblet of the Luftwaffe (27 October 1943)
- German Cross in Gold on 25 November 1943 as Leutnant in the II./Jagdgeschwader 54
- Iron Cross (1939)
  - 2nd class (13 June 1943)
  - 1st class (2 August 1943)
- Knight's Cross of the Iron Cross with Oak Leaves
  - Knight's Cross on 22 November 1943 as Leutnant (war officer) and Staffelführer of the 9./Jagdgeschwader 54
  - 448th Oak Leaves on 11 April 1944 as Oberleutnant (war officer) and Staffelkapitän of the 9./Jagdgeschwader 54

=== Dates of rank ===
| 1 November 1941: | Leutnant (Second Lieutenant) |
| 1 November 1943: | Oberleutnant (First Lieutenant) |
| 1 May 1944: | Hauptmann (Captain) |
| posthumously: | Major (Major), effective as of 1 September 1944 |
