= Shatalovo air base =

Military airbase in Smolensk Oblast, Russia

Shatalovo
- Pochinok, Smolensk Oblast in Russia
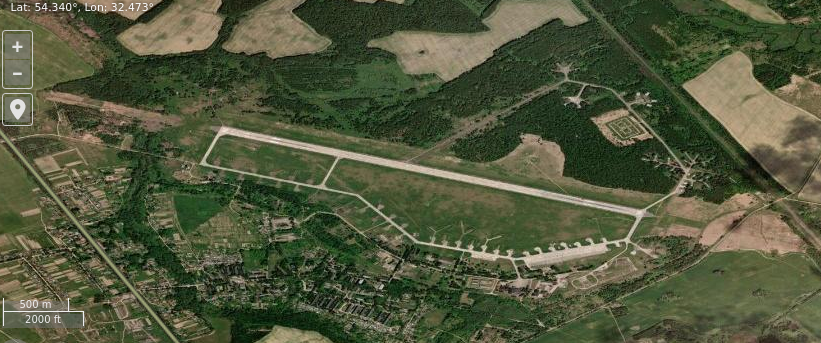
- Satellite imagery of Shatalovo air base

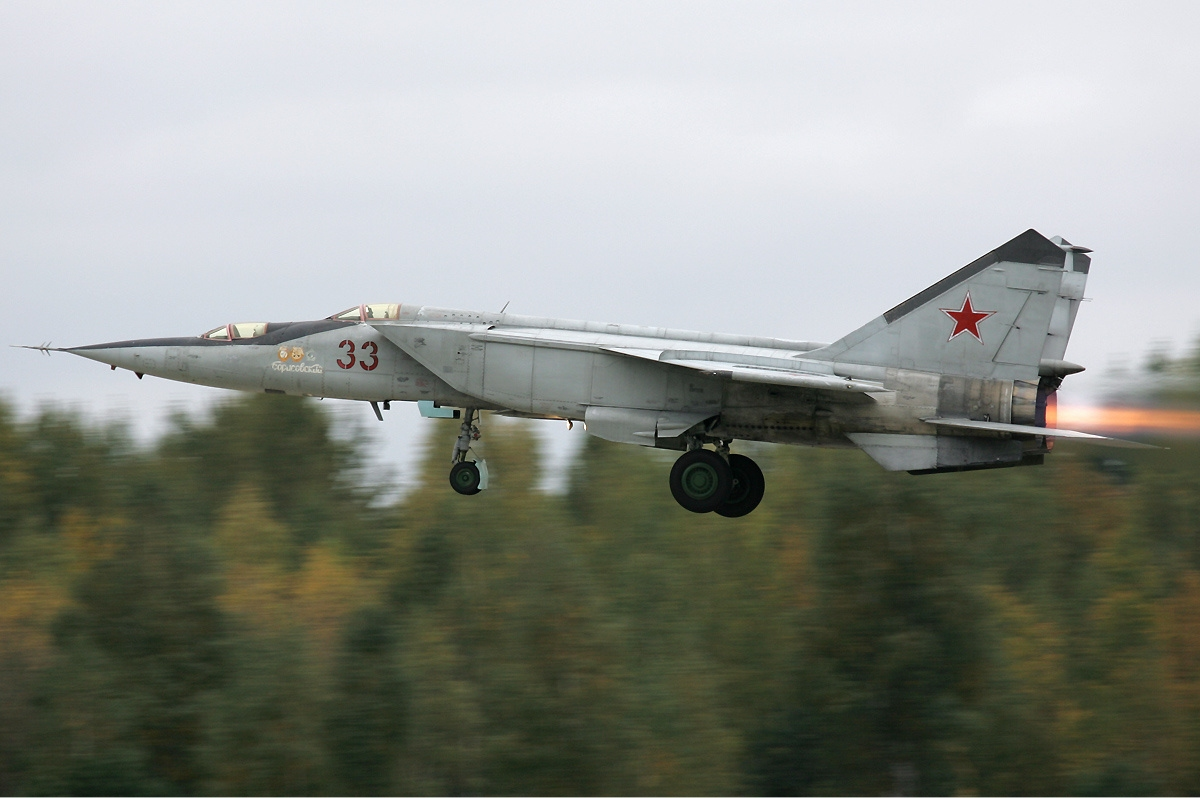

Site information
- Type: Air Base
- Owner: Ministry of Defence
- Operator: Russian Aerospace Forces
- Controlled by: 6th Air and Air Defence Forces Army

Location
- Shown within Smolensk Oblast, Russia Shatalovo (Russia)
- Coordinates: 54°20′24″N 32°28′24″E

Site history
- Built: 1968
- In use: 1968 - present
- Battles/wars: 2022 Russian invasion of Ukraine

Airfield information
- Identifiers: ICAO: UUBV
- Elevation: 153 metres (502 ft) AMSL
Runways
Direction	Length and surface
10/28	2,500 metres (8,202 ft) Concrete

Shatalovo is an air base in Pochinok, Pochinkovsky District, Smolensk Oblast of the Russian Aerospace Forces. It was part of the 6th Air and Air Defence Forces Army, Western Military District.

The base is also known as Pochinok, Satalovo, and Shatoalovo. It is a large hardened air base with pads for 19 bombers and 15 fighters in addition to a small amount of tarmac space. It is a nuclear bomber base (Su-24) according to a Natural Resources Defense Council study. During the 1980s it was one of 17 airfields hosting the Soviet Union's tactical reconnaissance aircraft regiments. The normal complement at the air base in 1984 consisted of 9 to 13 each of the Sukhoi Su-24M and Mikoyan-Gurevich MiG-25R, and 3 to 5 Yakovlev Yak-28R, the latter of which was being phased out.

== History ==
In World War II, the German Luftwaffe occupied the local area and maintained two airfields: "Shatalovka-East" (54°22′10″N 32°32′10″E) which was later abandoned and returned to farmland, and "Shatalovka-West" (54°20′20″N 32°28′30″E) which became the later Soviet air base, and which the Russian Air Force took over in the 1990s.

The 32nd Guards Fighter Aviation Regiment was stationed at the base from 1968 until it disbanded on 30 June 1989. It was part of the 9th Fighter Aviation Division headquartered at Kubinka.

Shatalovo was home to 164th ORAP (164th Independent Reconnaissance Aviation Regiment) flying Mikoyan-Gurevich MiG-25 and Sukhoi Su-24 aircraft and 47 Gv ORAP (47th Guards Independent Reconnaissance Aviation Regiment) flying MiG-25RB aircraft in the 1990s. The 164th Guards ORAP arrived from Poland in 1992, and disbanded in 1997. It was also used by 1046th TsBP i PLS (1046th Aircrew Combat Training and Retraining Centre) flying 17 MiG-25, 14 Sukhoi Su-17C, and 13 Su-24 aircraft in 1991.

As of February 2022, the base was home to the 4th Independent Reconnaissance Aviation Squadron equipped with Sukhoi Su-24MR (NATO: Fencer-E) and Antonov An-30 (ASCC: Clank) aircraft.

== See also ==
- List of military airbases in Russia
