= Fraunberg, Bavaria =

Fraunberg
- Municipality
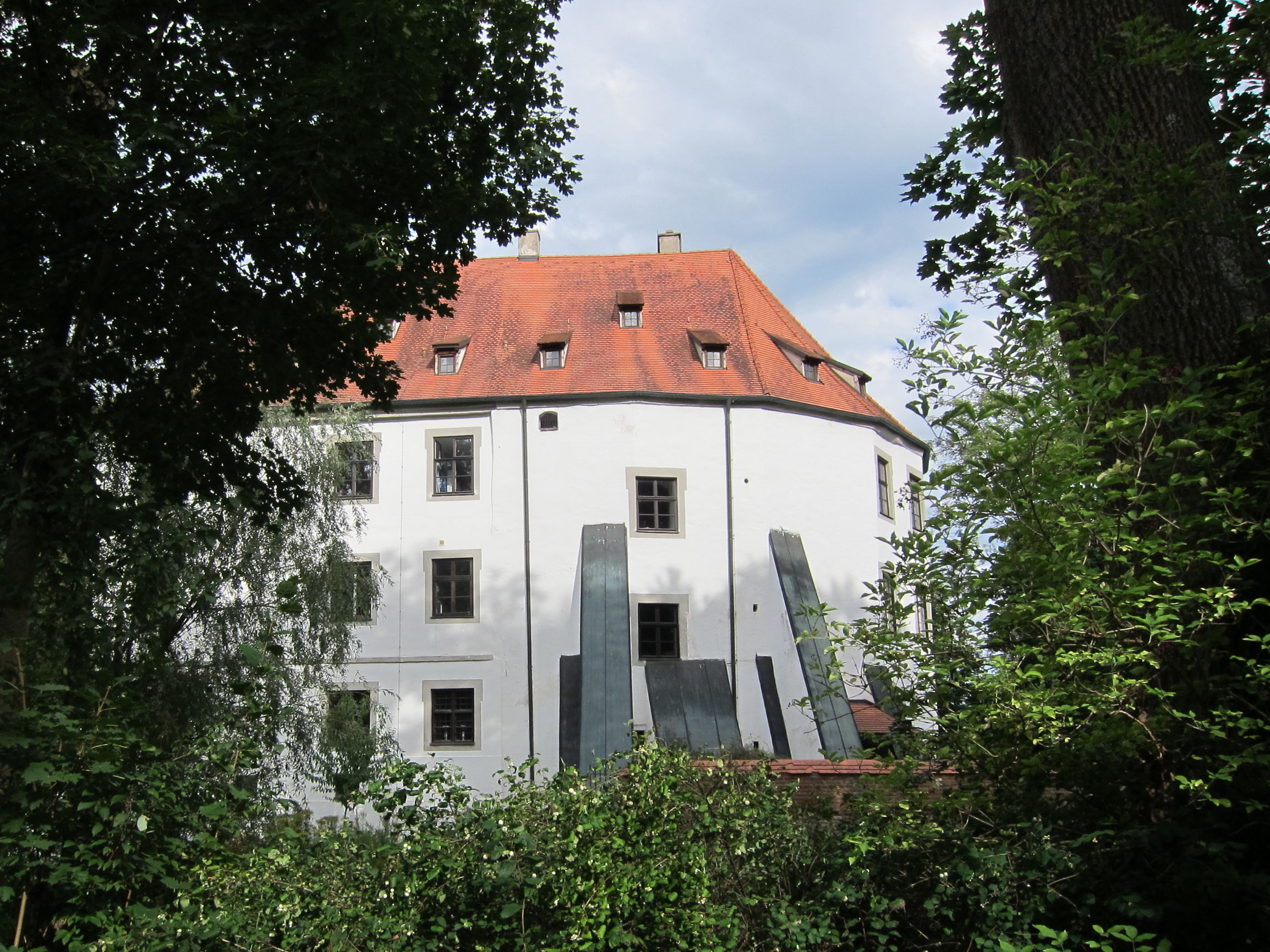
- Schloss Fraunberg

- Coat of arms

- Location of Fraunberg within Erding district
- Interactive map of Fraunberg
- Location within Germany Location within Bavaria
- Coordinates: 48°22′N 12°0′E
- Country: Germany
- State: Bavaria
- Admin. region: Oberbayern
- District: Erding

Government
  - Mayor (2020–26): Johann Wiesmaier

Area
  - Total: 42.36 km^{2} (16.36 sq mi)
- Elevation: 444 m (1,457 ft)

Population (2025-12-31)
  - Total: 3,896
  - Density: 91.97/km^{2} (238.2/sq mi)
- Time zone: UTC+01:00 (CET)
  - Summer (DST): UTC+02:00 (CEST)
- Postal codes: 85447
- Dialling codes: 08762
- Vehicle registration: ED
- Website: www.fraunberg.de

Fraunberg (German pronunciation: [ˈfʁaʊnbɛʁk]) is a municipality in the district of Erding in Bavaria in Germany.

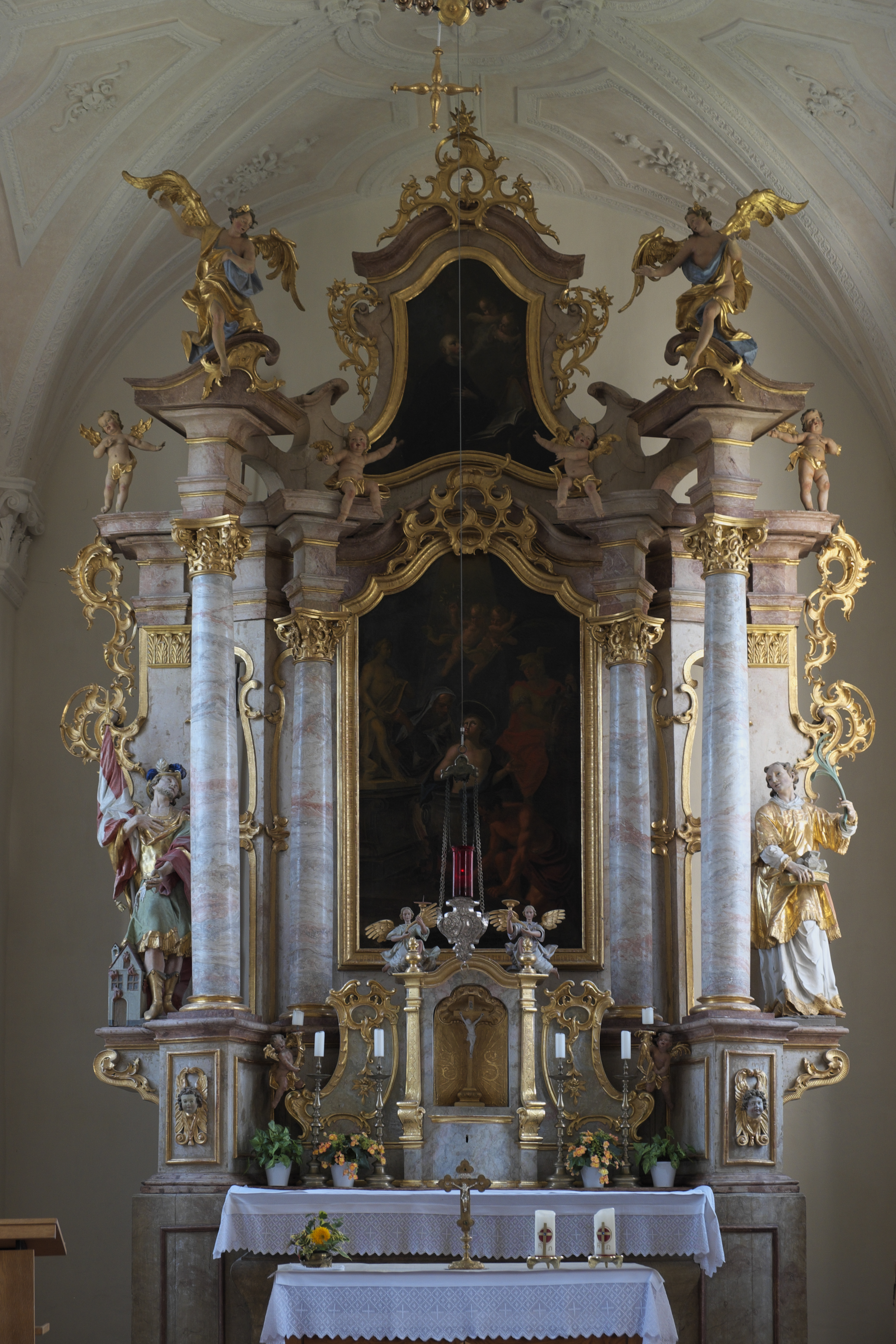
High altar of Saint Vitus in Grucking, Fraunberg, c. 1770

== Notable people ==
- Emil Lang, Luftwaffe flying ace
