= Pochinok (type of inhabited locality) =

Pochinok (Russian: Починок; derived from the Old Russian Pochati — "to begin") is a type of rural settlement in Russia.

== History ==
In Russia, prior to the 20th century, the term pochinok (from the word pochin — "beginning" or "initiation") referred to newly emerging rural settlements. The earliest mention of this term appears in the testamentary charter of Dmitry Donskoy (dating to the 1370s)..

According to Mikhail Tikhomirov, "unlike the names of selos (larger villages), which usually derive from the name of the village owner, the name of the local church, or some other characteristic, pochinoks and derevnyas (smaller villages) preserved the names of their original founders. Countless settlements named Ivanovka, Kasyanovka, Vasilyevka, etc., trace their origins to them".

A pochinok might be preceded by a zaimka (or zaimishche)—a site already claimed for agricultural use but lacking a permanent dwelling. Often, a pochinok—even if it began as a single-household offshoot from an existing village (frequently established on a forest clearing or a patch of land prepared by burning, where new arable farming was "initiated" or pochinalas)—would expand into a multi-household settlement and become a fully independent village. Once the settlers' grace period expired, the pochinoks they founded would acquire the status of derevnyas (villages). According to Georgy Kochin, a settlement was designated a derevnya if it possessed arable land; as long as the residents' agricultural foundation was not yet sufficiently established, the settlement was considered a pochinok. Subsequently, the word pochinok became fixed as a toponym for many such settlements, as well as a source for surnames derived from the founding families. Settlement in the form of pochinoks is particularly common in the forest zone of northeastern European Russia. In the region characterized by the chetvert land-tenure system, the term pochinok or pomestye referred to a section of a settlement that included allocated tracts of land. For instance, the village of Otrog in the Belgorod uyezd consisted of seven pochinki, the village of Belovskaya comprised eight, and the village of Nepkhaevo was made up of nineteen. These pochinki had their own names; for example, the village of Solomino included the Trunin, Ogureev, and Devitsynsky pochinki, among others. Three additional pochinki, founded by the three Filatov brothers, shared the collective name Filatovshchina. One section of the village of Osmolova in the Rylsky Uyezd was known as Vyrikov pochinok.

== See also ==
- Khutor
