= Pochinkovsky District =

Name of several administrative districts in Russia

Location of Nizhny Novgorod Oblast in Russia

Location of Smolensk Oblast in Russia

Pochinkovsky District is the name of several administrative and municipal districts in Russia:

- Pochinkovsky District, Nizhny Novgorod Oblast, an administrative and municipal district of Nizhny Novgorod Oblast
- Pochinkovsky District, Smolensk Oblast, an administrative and municipal district of Smolensk Oblast
