= Pochinok, Pochinkovsky District, Smolensk Oblast =

Town in Smolensk Oblast, Russia

Pochinok Починок
- Town
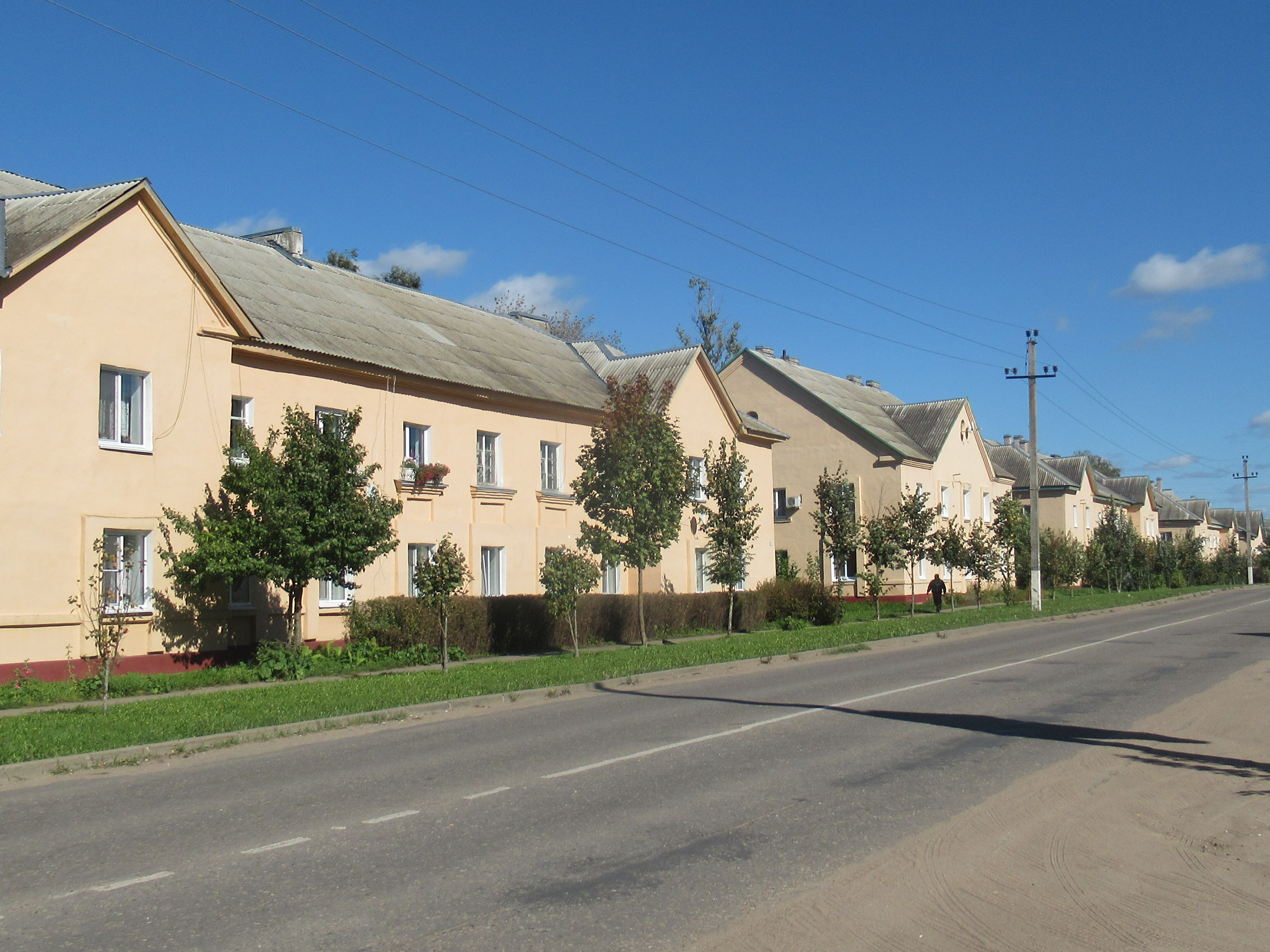
- Interactive map of Pochinok
- Location of Pochinok Pochinok (Smolensk Oblast)
- Coordinates: 54°24′N 32°27′E
- Country: Russia
- Federal subject: Smolensk Oblast
- Administrative district: Pochinkovsky District
- Urban settlementSelsoviet: Pochinkovskoye
- Village: 1811
- Town status since: 1926

Area
  - Total: 10.46 km^{2} (4.04 sq mi)
- Elevation: 205 m (673 ft)

Population (2010 Census)
  - Total: 8,776
  - Estimate (2024): 7,351 (−16.2%)
  - Density: 839.0/km^{2} (2,173/sq mi)

Administrative status
  - Capital of: Pochinkovsky District, Pochinkovskoye Urban Settlement

Municipal status
  - Municipal district: Pochinkovsky Municipal District
  - Urban settlement: Pochinkovskoye Urban Settlement
  - Capital of: Pochinkovsky Municipal District, Pochinkovskoye Urban Settlement
- Time zone: UTC+3 (MSK)
- Postal codes: 216450, 216499
- OKTMO ID: 66633101001

Pochinok (Russian: Почи́нок) is a town and the administrative center of Pochinkovsky District in Smolensk Oblast, Russia, located on the Khmara River (Dnieper's basin) 62 kilometers (39 mi) southeast of Smolensk, the administrative center of the oblast. Population: 8,776 (2010 census); 9,578 (2002 census); 10,753 (1989 Soviet census).

== History ==
Pochinok has been known since 1811 as a village. It belonged to Yelninsky Uyezd of Smolensk Governorate. In 1926, it was granted a town status. In October 1928, Yelninsky Uyezd was abolished and split between Smolensky, Roslavlsky, and Vyazemsky Uyezds. Pochinok was transferred to Smolensky Uyezd.

On 12 July 1929, governorates and uyezds were abolished, and Pochinkovsky District with the administrative center in the town of Pochinok was established. The district belonged to Roslavl Okrug of Western Oblast. On August 1, 1930, the okrugs were abolished, and the districts were subordinated directly to the oblast. On 27 September 1937 Western Oblast was abolished and split between Oryol and Smolensk Oblasts. Pochinkovsky District was transferred to Smolensk Oblast. Between 1941 and 1943, during WWII, the town was occupied by German troops.

== Administrative and municipal status ==
Within the framework of administrative divisions, Pochinok serves as the administrative center of Pochinkovsky District. As an administrative division, it is incorporated within Pochinkovsky District as Pochinkovskoye Urban Settlement. As a municipal division, this administrative unit also has urban settlement status and is a part of Pochinkovsky Municipal District.

== Economy ==
=== Industry ===
There are enterprises of textile and food industries in Pochinok.

=== Transportation ===
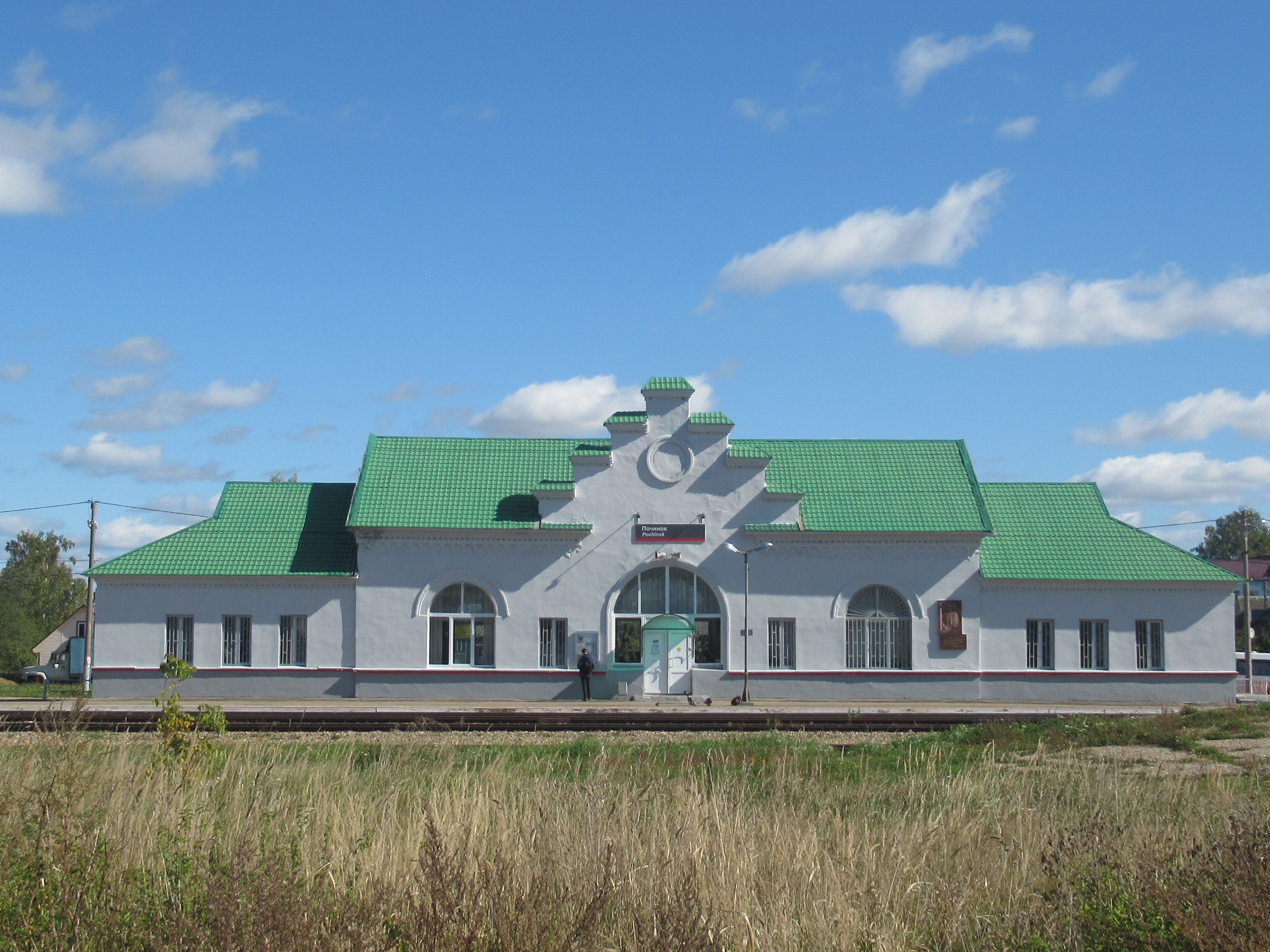
Pochinok railway station

A railway connecting Smolensk and Bryansk goes through Pochinok. Pochinok is the main railway station within Pochinkovsky district.

The R120 road (formerly A141), which connects Smolensk with Bryansk and Oryol, passes close to Pochinok. There is a road between Pochinok and Yelnya, as well as another one across the border to Mstsislaw where it continues to Orsha and Krychaw. There are also local roads with bus traffic originating from Pochinok.

=== Military ===
Since the Cold War, nearby Shatalovo air base has been a major training and operations facility for Soviet and Russian Air Force combat crews.

== Culture and recreation ==
In Pochinok, there is a local museum which was opened in 2000. The expositions highlight history of the district.

== Notable people ==
The most famous native of Pochinok is the artist and designer El Lissitzky.

== Geography ==
=== Climate ===
Pochinok has a warm-summer humid continental climate (Dfb in the Köppen climate classification).

Climate data for Pochinok
Month	Jan	Feb	Mar	Apr	May	Jun	Jul	Aug	Sep	Oct	Nov	Dec	Year
Mean daily maximum °C (°F)	−4.4 (24.1)	−3.6 (25.5)	1.9 (35.4)	11.2 (52.2)	17.5 (63.5)	20.6 (69.1)	23.2 (73.8)	21.9 (71.4)	16.1 (61.0)	8.9 (48.0)	2.5 (36.5)	−1.6 (29.1)	9.5 (49.1)
Daily mean °C (°F)	−6.5 (20.3)	−6.1 (21.0)	−1.4 (29.5)	6.6 (43.9)	13.2 (55.8)	16.7 (62.1)	19.3 (66.7)	17.9 (64.2)	12.5 (54.5)	6.2 (43.2)	0.7 (33.3)	−3.4 (25.9)	6.3 (43.4)
Mean daily minimum °C (°F)	−9 (16)	−9 (16)	−5.2 (22.6)	1.5 (34.7)	8 (46)	11.8 (53.2)	14.7 (58.5)	13.5 (56.3)	8.6 (47.5)	3.3 (37.9)	−1.2 (29.8)	−5.4 (22.3)	2.6 (36.7)
Average precipitation mm (inches)	52 (2.0)	45 (1.8)	45 (1.8)	46 (1.8)	72 (2.8)	84 (3.3)	94 (3.7)	78 (3.1)	64 (2.5)	69 (2.7)	55 (2.2)	50 (2.0)	754 (29.7)
Source: https://en.climate-data.org/asia/russian-federation/smolensk-oblast/pochinok-55753/
