= 121st Rifle Division =

- Active: September 1939 – June 1945
- Country: Soviet Union
- Branch: Red Army
- Type: Infantry
- Engagements: Soviet invasion of Poland; Soviet occupation of the Baltic states; Battle of Białystok–Minsk; Battle of Smolensk; Battle of Moscow; Battle of Voronezh; Voronezh–Kastornoye operation; Third Battle of Kharkov; Western Carpathian offensive; Moravska Ostrava offensive; Prague offensive
- Decorations: Order of the Red Banner; Order of Suvorov; Order of Bogdan Khmelnitsky
- Battle honours: Rylsk; Kiev

Commanders
- Notable commanders: Pyotr Zykov; Daniil Bushtruk

The 121st Rifle Division (Russian: 121-я стрелковая дивизия) was an infantry division of the Red Army during World War II.

Formed in September 1939 in Belarus, the division participated in the Soviet invasion of Poland later that month and in the June 1940 occupation of Lithuania.

== History ==
The division was formed between 6 and 11 September 1939 from the 99th Rifle Regiment of the 33rd Rifle Division in Mogilev, under the command of 33rd Rifle Division commander Colonel Alexander Mavrichev. It included the 383rd, 574th, and 705th Rifle Regiments, an artillery regiment and other units. The division fought in the Soviet invasion of Poland, as part of the 11th Rifle Corps of the 10th Army. The division advanced from Mogilev through Pogost, Cherven, Smilovichi, Dzerzhinsk, Novogrudok, Novoelnyu, Pruzhany, Ruzhany, Slonim, Kamenets, Vysokoye, Bielsk Podlaski, and Hajnówka. By the end of the campaign on 2 October it transferred to the 5th Rifle Corps. It relocated to Bobruisk on 8 October. After Mavrichev was transferred, Colonel Alexey Muravyov, previously a cavalry division assistant commander, became division commander in March.

=== Occupation of Lithuania ===
The division was slated for the Soviet occupation of Lithuania by the plan drawn up by deputy chief of the operations directorate of the General Staff Major General Alexander Vasilevsky on 6 June 1940, assigned to the 4th Rifle Corps of the 3rd Army on the southeastern border of Lithuania. This plan was modified and in the final version received by district commander Colonel General Dmitry Pavlov on 9 June in a directive of the People's Commissar of Defense, the 121st was instead assigned to the 24th Rifle Corps in the second echelon of the 3rd Army, which was deployed along the line of Vidzy, Sventyany and the Viliya River. The division was planned to finish unloading from railcars at Polotsk on 12 June and begin a 150-kilometer march to the Opsa area. Within two days, the 121st was to concentrate near Opsa with one regiment still on the march, preparing to advance behind the first-echelon 126th Rifle Division on 15 June, the first day of the invasion. The invasion plan was again revised on 13 June, assigning the 121st to the 4th Rifle Corps and no longer dividing the forces of the 3rd Army into two echelons. This resulted in new orders that directed the division to take up its starting positions by 20:00 on 14 June in the area of Gervyaly, with flanks at Pupina and Borovka 8 to 15 kilometers northwest of Vidzy. The corps was assigned the mission of advancing in the direction of Rimšė, Dūkštas, Daugailiai, Užpaliai, and Svėdasai.

When the invasion began on 15 June, the 121st approached the state border at 16:00 and by the end of the day reached Gyajunai, south of Lake Dysnykštis. That day, the Lithuanian government found resistance impossible and accepted the Soviet ultimatum to Lithuania, under which the 4th Rifle Corps was planned to be stationed in the Panemunis area. On 16 June, the 121st was 8 kilometers southwest of Salakas at 10:30 and reached the area of Gateliai and Brinkliškės by 15:20. Continuing the advance, by 12:00 on 17 June it reached the area of Vaineikiai, Šeduikiai, Vilučiai, and Užpaliai, and by the end of the day on 18 June was stopped for rest between Šimonys and Svėdasai. The division paused there for a day and at 19:00 on 20 June entered the area of Skapiškis and Rokiškis. After the 4th Rifle Corps pushed forward into Latvia, the 121st was transferred to the 24th Rifle Corps, and at 7:00 on 21 June it reached the area of Rokiskis, Skapiškis, Pandėlys, and Panemunėlis, where it remained for the next few weeks.

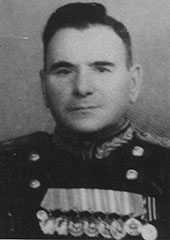
A late-war or postwar photograph of Zykov

While the division was in Lithuania, on 7 July, Major General Pyotr Zykov, previously assistant commander of the 47th Rifle Corps, became division commander. After the end of the campaign the division returned to its bases in Bobruisk, Rogachev, and Zhlobin. On 11 June 1941 the division was relocated to its summer camp in the area of Obuz and Lesnaya. It is listed as being part of the 47th Rifle Corps, directly subordinate to the Western Special Military District, on the eve of Operation Barbarossa, the German invasion of the Soviet Union.

=== Second World War ===
After the beginning of Operation Barbarossa on 22 June 1941, the division as took up defensive positions on the eastern bank of the Shchara River in the Slonim area on the next day as part of the 13th Army. From 24 June it fought in heavy defensive battles, retreating to Baranovichi, Slutsk, Osipovichi, the village of Boyarshchina, and Starye Dorogi. The division was encircled in late June but broke out on 7 July and was withdrawn to Novozybkov for replenishment. The 121st soon returned to the front and fought in the Battle of Smolensk with the 13th Army of the Central Front, then fought in defensive battles on the Sozh, Sudost, and Desna, and from 30 September in the Battle of Bryansk following the commencement of Operation Typhoon, the German attack that began the Battle of Moscow. During this period, the 121st was encircled for the second time in area of Khutor Mikhailovsky and the Kinelsky forest, but broke out in the area of Pesochnaya and Lgov. The division went on to fight in the defense of Tim and the Yelets offensive, and was withdrawn to the Southwestern Front reserve in the Yelets area on 15 December.

After being receiving reinforcement, the 121st joined the 40th Army in February 1942 and defended positions near Tim from Novo-Aleksandrovskoye to Polevoye. For his actions, Zykov was awarded a third Order of the Red Banner on 27 March 1942. The division was transferred to the 60th Army on 28 June and fought in attacks in the Battle of Voronezh and by 4 July reached the area of Zemlyansk, but was forced to retreat to the line of Medvezhye and Chistaya Polyana, covering the crossings of the Don. From 7 July it fought in battles south of Voronezh in what became known in Soviet historiography as the Voronezh–Voroshilovgrad Defensive operation. In October, Zykov became deputy commander of the 60th Army.

Colonel Mikhail Bushin became division commander in November. The division defended positions south of Voronezh until 2 January 1943 and attacked in the Voronezh–Kastornoye operation and the Kharkov offensive operation. During these battles, it participated in the recapture of Voronezh and Shchigry. For "poor organization" of the battle for the village of Kolpakovo, Bushin was relieved of command on 1 March. By 11 March the 121st reached the Seym River in the area of the fortified points of Iznoskovo and Zhadino, then went on the defensive. Major General Ivan Ladygin became commander of the division on 13 March. In late March the division and the 60th Army became part of the Central Front, with which it fought in the Battle of Kursk and the Battle of the Dnieper. For participating in the recapture of Rylsk the division received the name of the city as an honorific on 31 August. Continuing to advance in what became known as the Chernigov–Pripyat offensive, the division forced the Desna on 23 September and within two days the Dnieper and captured a bridgehead at Yasnogorodka. From 3 November the division advanced out of the bridgehead in the Kiev offensive, participating in the recapture of Kiev. On 6 November 1943 the 121st received the name of the city as an honorific. Between 18 November and late December the division fought against German counterattacks in the Kiev Defensive Operation.

The division resumed the advance in the Zhitomir–Berdichev offensive on 27 December and subsequently fought in the Rovno–Lutsk offensive. In early March 1944 the division was transferred to the 4th Guards Army of the 1st Ukrainian Front, breaking through Axis defenses in the sector of Vyshnipol and Serverin, reaching the eastern bank of the Southern Bug in the area of Medzhybizh, where until 17 March it participated in fierce fighting. For participation in the recapture of Starokonstantinov, Izyaslav, Shumsk, Yampol, and Ostropol the division was awarded the Order of the Red Banner on 19 March. Subsequently, it fought in the Proskurov–Chernovitsy offensive. The 121st was transferred to the 38th Army between 16 and 17 April and relocated through Zaleshchiki to the Chernelytsia area, where it fought in heavy defensie battles. From 11 May the division was withdrawn to the second echelon of the 67th Rifle Corps, and from 14 July it fought in the Lvov–Sandomierz offensive. During the latter, Ladygin was severely wounded and evacuated to the hospital on 22 July, and was replaced in command by division deputy commander Colonel Pyotr Dotsenko on the next day. In heavy fighting the division forced the San on 14 August and then went on the defensive.

The division went on the offensive again from 8 September in the Eastern Carpathian offensive, the Carpathian–Dukla offensive, and battles southwest of Sanok. In late November Dotsenko handed over command of the 121st to division chief of staff Colonel Ivan Generalov and left to study at the Higher Military Academy. Colonel Daniil Bushtruk, a Hero of the Soviet Union, became division commander on 21 December 1944. As part of the 52nd Rifle Corps of the 38th Army of the 4th Ukrainian Front, the division fought in the Western Carpathian offensive and the Moravska Ostrava offensive, participating in the capture of Bielsko-Biała, Wadowice, and Nowy Sącz. The division was awarded the Order of Bogdan Khmelnitsky, 2nd class, on 19 February 1945 for its participation in the capture of Wadowice, Spišská Nová Ves, Spišská Stará Ves, and Levoča. On 3 April Bushtruk was wounded and evacuated from the front. From 12 April 1945 the 121st was commanded by Colonel Ivan Dryakhlov. The division subsequently fought in the Prague offensive. For participating in the capture of Bohumín, Fryštát, Skoczów, Čadca, and Bytča the division was awarded the Order of Suvorov, 2nd class, on 4 June 1945.

The division was disbanded at Osiek between 28 and 30 June after completing a march from Golczowice, with its troops being used to bring units of the 52nd Army up to strength by 6 July.
