= Pyotr Zykov =

Red Army major general

Pyotr Maximovich Zykov
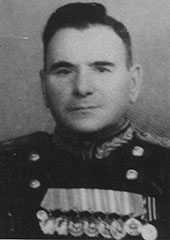
- Zykov between 1945 and 1946
- Born: 14 January 1890; Gostevo village, Kotelnichsky Uyezd, Vyatka Governorate, Russian Empire
- Died: 22 September 1960 (aged 70) Lvov, Ukrainian SSR, Soviet Union
- Allegiance: Russian Empire; Russian SFSR; Soviet Union
- Branch: Imperial Russian Army; Red Army (later Soviet Army)
- Service years: 1911–1918; 1918–1946
- Rank: Major general
- Commands: 48th Rifle Division; 121st Rifle Division; 18th Rifle Corps
- Conflicts: October Revolution; Russian Civil War; World War II
- Awards: Order of Lenin

Pyotr Maximovich Zykov (Russian: Пётр Максимович Зыков; 14 January 1890 – 22 September 1960) was a Red Army major general.

Zykov left his native village to work as a gold miner and was drafted into the Imperial Russian Army in 1911, becoming a non-commissioned officer. Serving with a reserve unit during World War I, he participated in the October Revolution in Ashgabat and joined the Red Army during the Russian Civil War. He fought in North Russia and was decorated for his actions, ending the war as an assistant regimental commander. Holding command positions in reserve units from the late 1920s, Zykov rose to division command in the late 1930s. He commanded the 121st Rifle Division from the beginning of Operation Barbarossa, leading it in the Battles of Białystok–Minsk, Smolensk, Moscow, and Voronezh. After a stint as 60th Army deputy commander in late 1942, Zykov commanded the 18th Rifle Corps in the Soviet advance into Ukraine after the Battle of Stalingrad in early 1943, before returning to his old position as 60th Army deputy commander. He held this position until late 1944, when he was transferred to a noncombat post as military district deputy commander due to health issues. Zykov retired shortly after the end of the war.

== Early life, World War I, and Russian Civil War ==
Zykov was born to a peasant family on 14 January 1890 in the village of Gostevo, Vyatka Governorate. From 1909 he worked as a miner at the Andreyevsky camp of the Lena Gold Mines in Bodaybo. In December 1911 he was drafted into the Imperial Russian Army and sent to the 17th Siberian Rifle Regiment of the 5th Siberian Rifle Division in Berezovka, serving as a ryadovoy in its 12th company. In 1913 he graduated from the regimental training detachment, remaining with the detachment as a platoon unter-ofitser. Upon the outbreak of World War I in 1914 and the dissolution of the regimental training detachment, Zykov was appointed a feldfebel in the 7th company of the 5th Siberian Reserve Rifle Battalion, formed in Berezovka. In 1916 the battalion was expanded into a regiment and relocated to Ashgabat (Ashkhabad) as part of the 7th Siberian Reserve Rifle Brigade. During the October Revolution in 1917, Zykov participated in the arrest of the officers of the Ashgabat garrison, and the disarmament of Cossack units. In early November 1917 he was sent to Tashkent to suppress a Junker revolt, before being demobilized in early 1918 with the rank of senior unter-ofitser.

After returning to his home village, Zykov joined the Red Army at Kotelnich in May 1918 during the Russian Civil War and was sent to the 82nd Rifle Regiment of the 10th Rifle Division. As an assistant company commander and company commander, he fought with the regiment on the Northern and Northwestern Fronts in the Pskov and Gdov districts. He was shell-shocked in February 1919, wounded in the arm in June near the village of Tuloksa, and wounded in the foot near Dno in October. After the regiment was transferred to the 18th Rifle Division in November 1919, Zykov served as a battalion commander, assistant regimental commander, and deputy regimental commander in fighting against British and Finnish troops in the Olonets district. For distinguishing himself during 1919, Zykov subsequently received the Order of the Red Banner twice, in 1919 and 1924.

== Interwar period ==
After the end of the war, Zykov returned to his home area and from June 1921 served as a pre-conscription training instructor at the Kotelnichsky Uyezd military commissariat, and in January 1924 became assistant uyezd military commissar. He commanded the 5th Separate Reserve Battalion of the 2nd Vyatka Territorial Reserve Rifle Regiment from October 1927, then the 9th Reserve Regiment from November 1929. Zykov simultaneously graduated from the Vystrel course in 1930 and in April 1933 became commander of the 4th Separate Experimental Rifle Regiment. After taking command of the 142nd Rifle Regiment of the 48th Rifle Division of the Moscow Military District in June 1934, Zykov rose rapidly from the late 1930s, becoming assistant commander of the 33rd Rifle Division in March 1937, commander of the 48th Rifle Division in June of the same year, assistant commander of the 47th Rifle Corps of the Belorussian Special Military District in August 1939, and commander of the 121st Rifle Division of the 47th Corps on 7 July 1940. Zykov was promoted to kombrig on 4 November 1939 and was made a major general when the Red Army reintroduced generals' ranks on 4 June 1940.

== World War II ==
The day after the beginning of Operation Barbarossa on 22 June 1941, Zykov led the 121st Rifle Division as it took defensive positions on the eastern bank of the Shchara River in the Slonim area as part of the 13th Army. From 24 June it fought in heavy defensive battles, retreating to Baranovichi, Slutsk, Osipovichi, the village of Boyarshchina, and Starye Dorogi. The division was encircled in late June but broke out on 7 July and was withdrawn to Novozybkov for replenishment. The 121st soon returned to the front and fought in the Battle of Smolensk, then fought in defensive battles on the Sozh, Sudost, and Desna, and from 30 September in the Battle of Bryansk following the commencement of Operation Typhoon, the German attack that began the Battle of Moscow. During this period, the 121st was encircled for the second time in the Kinelsky forest, but broke out in the area of Pesochnaya and Lgov. The division went on to fight in the defense of Tim and the Yelets Offensive, and was withdrawn to the Southwestern Front reserve in the Yelets area on 15 December.

After being receiving reinforcement, the 121st joined the 40th Army in February 1942 and defended positions near Tim from Novo-Aleksandrovskoye to Polevoye. For his actions, Zykov was awarded a third Order of the Red Banner on 27 March 1942. The division was transferred to the 60th Army on 28 June and fought in attacks in the Battle of Voronezh and by 4 July reached the area of Zemlyansk, but was forced to retreat to the line of Medvezhye and Chistaya Polyana, covering the crossings of the Don. In October, Zykov became deputy commander of the 60th Army and in December took command of the army's 18th Rifle Corps. He led the corps in the Ostrogozhsk–Rossosh Offensive and the Voronezh–Kastornoye operation, during which it participated in the recapture of Rossosh and Voronezh. Assessed as a "strong-willed, enterprising commander who understands modern combat and has extensive rifle unit command experience," Zykov received the Order of Suvorov, 2nd class, for his "skillful command" of the corps, on 8 February 1943. In early February, the corps headquarters was used to form that of the 69th Army, of which he briefly served as deputy commander.

Resuming his previous post as deputy commander of the 60th Army later in February, Zykov participated in the Battle of Kursk, the recapture of Left-bank Ukraine, the Battle of Kiev, the Zhitomir–Berdichev Offensive, the Rovno–Lutsk Offensive, the Proskurov–Chernovitsy Offensive, and the Lvov–Sandomierz Offensive. For his actions, he was awarded the Order of Lenin on 10 January 1944 and the Order of Bogdan Khmelnitsky, 2nd class, on 23 September 1944. Due to frequent illness and poor health, Zykov was placed at the disposal of the Main Personnel Directorate in October 1944 and a month later became the deputy commander of the troops of the Lvov Military District, a noncombat post. Despite his illnesses as deputy commander of the 60th Army, his superiors considered him to have been "always where the situation required him to be, inspiring fighters and commanders to fulfill assigned tasked by example."

== Postwar ==
After the end of the war, Zykov continued to serve as district deputy commander, and on 20 July 1946 was transferred to the reserve. He lived in Lvov, working as chief of the military department of the Lvov State Pedogogical and Lvov Agricultural Institutes before his death on 22 September 1960.

== Awards and honors ==
Zykov was a recipient of the following awards and decorations:

- Order of Lenin (2)
- Order of the Red Banner (5)
- Order of Suvorov, 2nd class
- Order of Bogdan Khmelnitsky, 2nd class

He was elected a deputy of first convocation of the rubber-stamp Supreme Soviet of the Russian SFSR from the Toropets electoral district in 1938. Despite this, Zykov did not become a Communist Party member until 1942.
