= Pogar =

Pogar may refer to:

- Pogar, Vareš, a populated place in Vareš, Bosnia and Herzegovina
- Pogar, India, a village in Aurangabad District, Bihar, India
- Pogar, Russia, name of several inhabited localities in Russia
