= Tochka =

Tochka may refer to:

- OTR-21 Tochka, Soviet tactical ballistic missile
- Tochka, Vologda Oblast, village in Domshinskoye Rural Settlement, Sheksninsky District, Vologda Oblast, Russia
- Tochka (river), left tributary of Snov, Bryansk Oblast, Russia
