= Pioneers-heroes =

Soviet children heroes of World War II

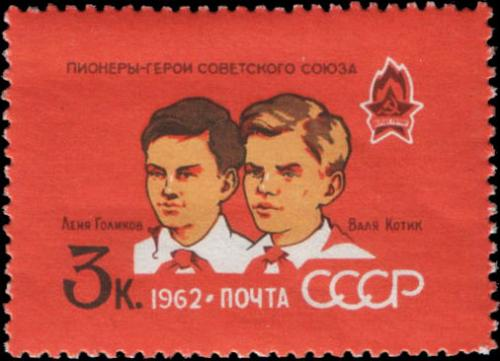
USSR post stamp.The pioneers-heroes Lyonya Golikov and Valya Kotik

Pioneer heroes were Soviet pioneers who made feats during the Great Patriotic War.

The images of pioneer heroes were actively used in the Soviet Union as examples of high morals. The official list of pioneer heroes was issued in 1954 with the compilation of the Book of Honor of the Vladimir Lenin All-Union Pioneer Organization; The books of honor of local pioneer organizations joined it. For propaganda purposes, some young persons were entered the "Book of Honor", but who were actually not pioneers, notably Pavlik Morozov listed as Number 1 in the Book of Honor, but, as turned out, his biography was thoroughly fabricated by Soviet propaganda.

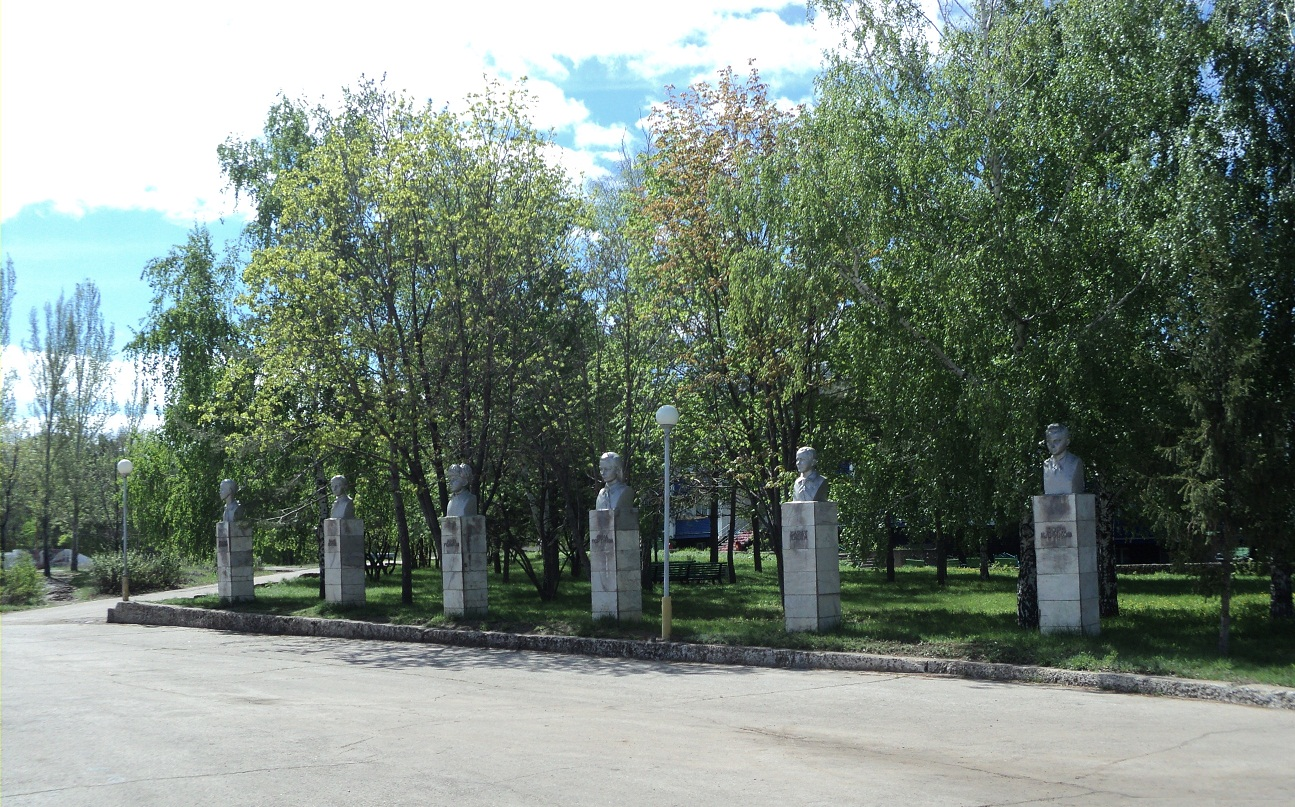
Memorial to the pioneers heroes of the Great Patriotic War near Tolyatti, the former Young Pioneer camp "Scarlet Sails" (From right to left: Borya Tsarikov, Marat Kazey, Zinaida Portnova, Lyonya Golikov, Valya Kotik and Volodya Dubinin).

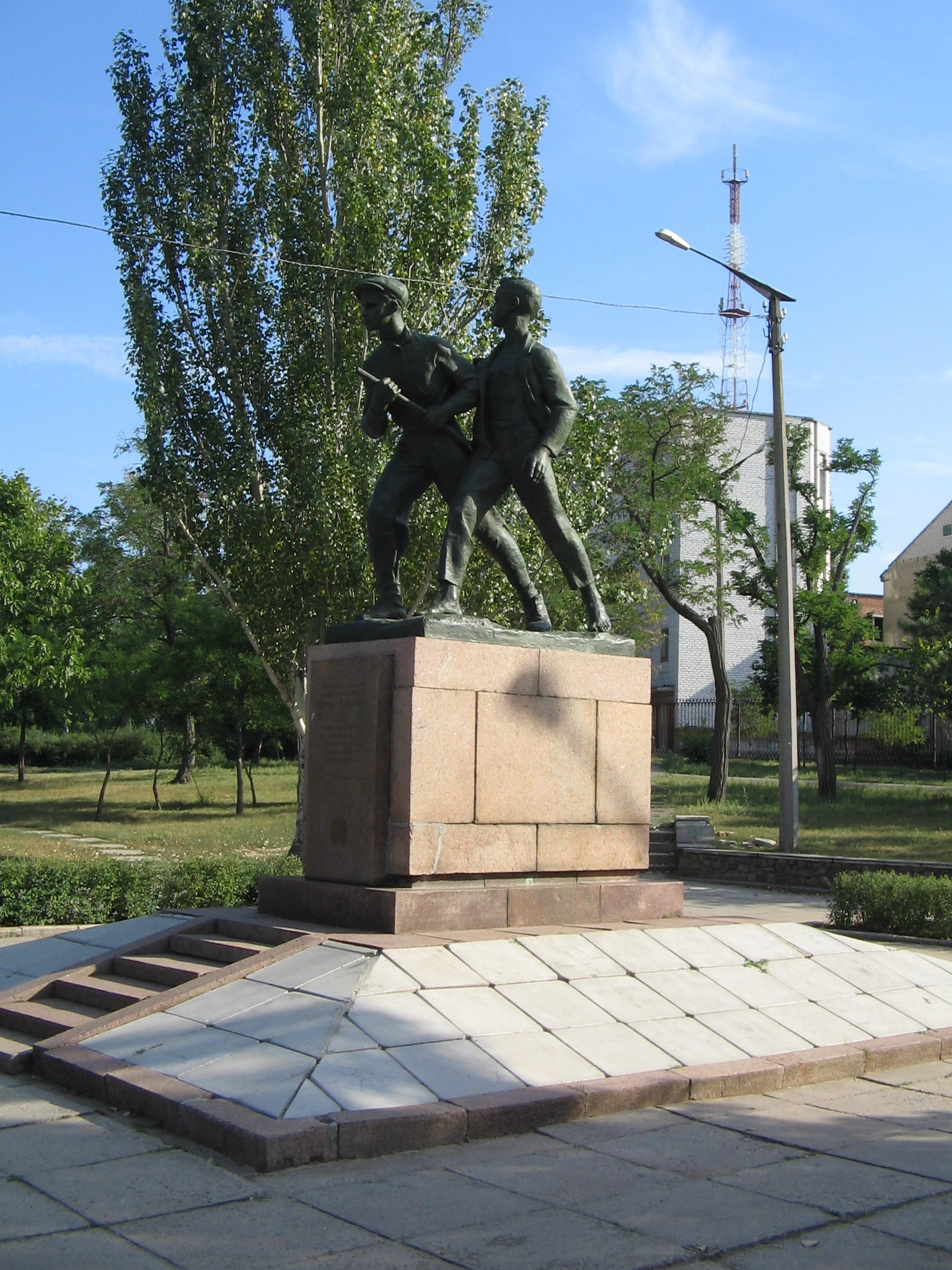
Memorial to Shura Kober and Vitya Khomenko in Mykolayiv

== Pioneer-heroes in popular culture ==
Positive images of pioneer-heroes were actively exploited in Soviet propaganda and a many books and films were devoted to them.

The 1957 Soviet film Orlyonok is about a Soviet World War II pioneer-hero, whose image combines facts form biographies of real pioneer-heroes, Heroes of the Soviet Union, Valentin Kotyk and Marat Kazey. Some other films involving pioneer-heroes include Street of the Younger Son, Green Chains, First Squad, and Fortress of War.
