= Pogar, Russia =

One of several places in Bryansk Oblast, Russia

Pogar (Russian: Погар or Погарь) is the name of several inhabited localities in Bryansk Oblast, Russia.

Urban localities

- Pogar (urban-type settlement), a work settlement in Pogarsky District

Rural localities

- Pogar (rural locality), a village in Nadvinsky Selsoviet of Kletnyansky District
