= Grinevo =

Grinyovo (Russian: Гринёво) or Grinevo (Гринево) is the name of several rural localities in Russia:

- Grinevo, Arkhangelsk Oblast, a settlement in Tavrengsky Selsoviet of Konoshsky District of Arkhangelsk Oblast
- Grinevo, Belgorod Oblast, a selo in Novooskolsky District of Belgorod Oblast
- Grinyovo, Bryansk Oblast, a selo in Grinevsky Rural Administrative Okrug of Pogarsky District of Bryansk Oblast
- Grinevo, Novgorod Oblast, a village in Poddorskoye Settlement of Poddorsky District of Novgorod Oblast
- Grinevo, Pskov Oblast, a village in Sebezhsky District of Pskov Oblast
- Grinevo, Smolensk Oblast, a village in Talashkinskoye Rural Settlement of Smolensky District of Smolensk Oblast
- Grinevo, Tula Oblast, a village in Dolmatovskaya Rural Administration of Chernsky District of Tula Oblast
- Grinevo, Vologda Oblast, a village in Verkhny Selsoviet of Babayevsky District of Vologda Oblast
