= Kyselivka rural hromada =

Kyselivka rural hromada Киселівська сільська громада
- Hromada
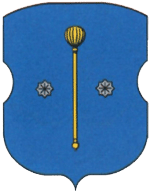
- Coat of arms
- Interactive map of Kyselivka rural hromada
- Country: Ukraine
- Oblast: Chernihiv
- Raion: Chernihiv

Area
  - Total: 269.9 km^{2} (104.2 sq mi)

Population (2020)
  - Total: 5,499
  - Density: 20.37/km^{2} (52.77/sq mi)
- CATOTTG code: UA74100150000090847
- Settlements: 15
- Villages: 15
- Website: kyselivska-gromada.gov.ua

Kyselivka rural hromada (Ukrainian: Киселівська сільська громада) is a hromada of Ukraine, located in Chernihiv Raion, Chernihiv Oblast. The Kyselivka rural hromada is located within the Dnieper Lowland, on the left bank of the Desna River (Dnieper basin). Its administrative center is the village of Kyselivka.

It has an area of 269.9 square kilometres (104.2 mi^{2}) and a population of 5,499, as of 2020.

== Composition ==
In accordance with the order of the Cabinet of Ministers of Ukraine N^{o} 730-r June 12, 2020, the territories of the Voznesenska, Petrushynska, and Terekhivska village councils of Chernihiv district were included in the Kyselivka rural hromada.

The hromada contains 15 settlements, which are all villages:

- Berezanka
- Boromyky
- Brusyliv
- Kyselivka
- Kobylyanka
- Malynivka
- Morhulychi
- Novoselivka
- Petrove
- Petrushyn
- Snovyanka
- Stasi
- Terekhivka
- Tovstolis
- Voznesenske

== Geography ==
The Kyselivka rural hromada is located in the east of Chernihiv raion, bordering the city of Chernihiv in the southwest.The territory of the hromada is located within the Dnieper Lowland, on the left bank of the Desna River (Dnieper basin). In the east of the community's territory flows the Snov River, a right tributary of the Desna River. The relief of the surface of the Kyselivka rural hromada is a lowland plain, there are oxbow lake and artificial lakes in the floodplain of the river.

The climate of Kyselivka rural hromada is moderately continental, with warm summers and relatively mild winters. The average temperature in January is about -7 °C, and in July - +19 °C. The average annual precipitation ranges from 550 to 660 mm, with the highest precipitation in the summer period.

The most common are sod-podzolic and gray forest soils. The Kyselivka rural hromada is located in the natural zone of mixed forests, in Polissya. The main species in the forests are pine, oak, alder, ash, birch. Minerals – loam, peat, sand.

Regional highways H-27 and H-28 pass through the hromada, there is no railway connection.The nearest railway station is in the city of Chernihiv.

== See also ==
- List of hromadas of Ukraine
