= Arkady Veprev =

- Аркадий Вепрев

1st Governor of Krasnoyarsk Krai
- In office 29 December 1991 – 27 January 1993
- Succeeded by: Valery Zubov

Personal details
- Born: Arkady Filimonovich Veprev; 20 October 1927 Varenitsy, Kotelnichsky Uyezd, Vyatka Governorate, RSFSR, Soviet Union
- Died: 23 July 2006 (aged 78) Stepnoy, Nazarovsky District, Krasnoyarsk Krai, Russia

Arkady Filimonovich Veprev (Russian: Аркадий Филимонович Вепрев; 20 October 1927 – 23 July 2006), was a Russian politician who was the Governor of Krasnoyarsk Krai from 1991 to 1993. He had also been a people's Deputy of the Soviet Union and the chairman of the collective farm "Nazarovsky" of the Krasnoyarsk Krai and was awarded the title of Hero of Socialist Labour.

== Biography ==
Arkady Veprev was born 29 October 1927 in the village of Varenitsy, to a large peasant family. From the age of fifteen, he began to work as an accountant on a collective farm, the war prevented him from graduating from school. From 1942 to 1944, he worked on the Vorontsovsky collective farm in the Kirov Oblast.

From 1944 to 1952, Veprev served in the army, as he was the a cadet of the Chelyabinsk military aviation school of navigators and gunners-radio operators, and an air gunner-radio operator of long-range aviation.

From 1952 to 1953 he was an apprentice of a borer, a borer of a machine-building plant in Moscow.

In 1958, he graduated from the Moscow Agricultural Academy. During his studies, he was a Stalinist scholarship holder, secretary of the Komsomol organization and a member of the party bureau of the faculty.

From 1958 to 1990, he has an agronomist of the agricultural inspection, chief agronomist, since 1959 - director of the Nazarovsky state farm in the Nazarovsky district of the Krasnoyarsk Krai. This farm was considered one of the best in the USSR. Here they received a stable 30-35 centners of grain per hectare, milk yields approached four and a half thousand liters per cow, and the cost of meat was the cheapest in the country and significantly lower than in England, the Netherlands and Sweden.

By the Decree of the Presidium of the Supreme Soviet of the USSR of 9 June 1984, for achieving outstanding performance and labor heroism, shown in the implementation of plans and socialist obligations to increase the production and sale of grain and other agricultural products to the state in 1983, Veprev was awarded the title of Hero of Socialist Labor with the award Order of Lenin and gold medal "Hammer and Sickle".

As part of the Soviet delegation, Veprev, as an outstanding practitioner of Siberian agriculture, went to speak in the US Senate, after which American senators came to the Krasnoyarsk Krai to the Nazarovsky state farm.

From 1990 to 1991, he was the Chairman of the Committee of the Supreme Soviet of the USSR on Agrarian Issues and Food.

On 29 December 1991, Veprev was appointed the 1st Governor (Head) of the Krasnoyarsk Krai, officially taking office on 31 December.

In mid-1992, a confrontation began between the executive and legislative branches, which ended with the voluntary resignation of Veprev. On 21 January 1993, he resigned "due to health reasons", and on 27 January, by decree of the President of Russia Boris Yeltsin, Vrepev was released from office, and was replaced by Valery Zubov.

In 1993, he was retired and was an adviser-consultant of CJSC Nazarovskoye (the former state farm headed by him).

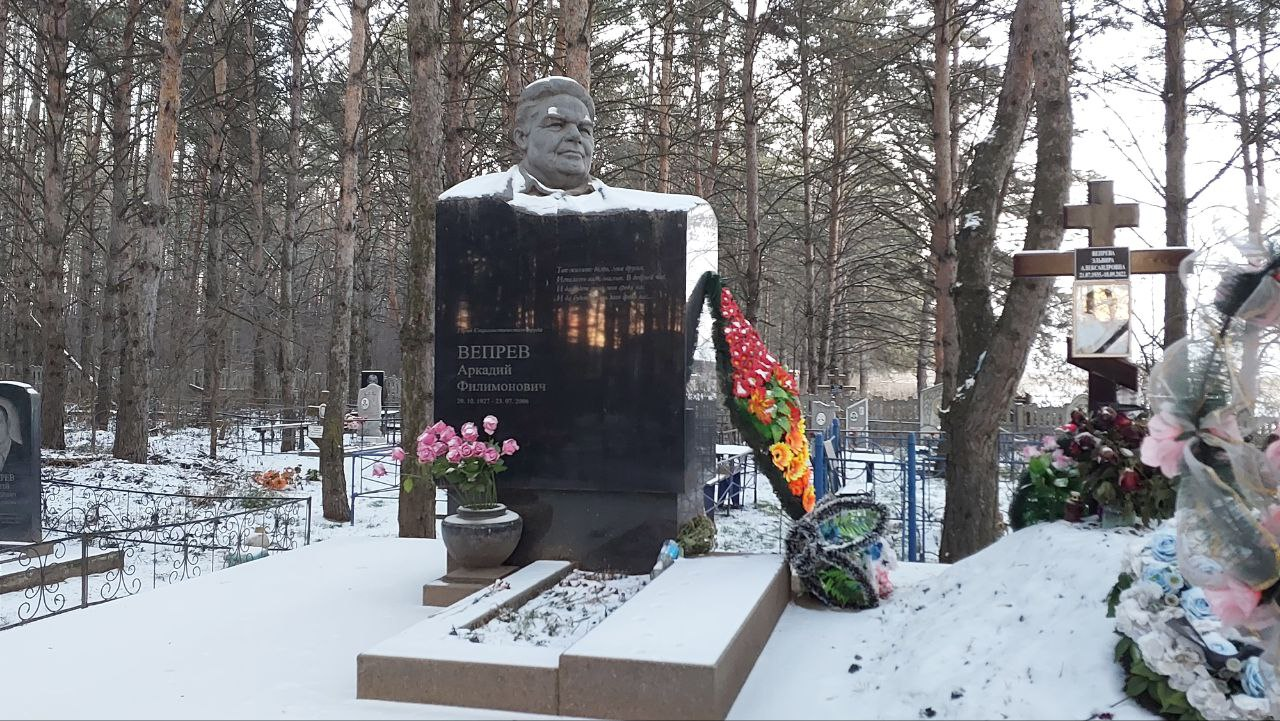
Grave in Stepnoy

He lived the rest of his in the village of Stepnoy, Nazarovsky district, where he died on 27 July 2006, as the cause of death was a massive heart attack. He was buried in Stepnoy.

== Family ==
He was married to his wife, Elvira Vepreva.
