= Dmitrovsk =

Town in Oryol Oblast, Russia

Dmitrovsk Дмитровск
- Town
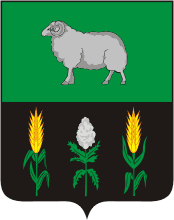
- Coat of arms
- Interactive map of Dmitrovsk
- Location of Dmitrovsk Dmitrovsk (Oryol Oblast)
- Coordinates: 52°31′N 35°10′E
- Country: Russia
- Federal subject: Oryol Oblast
- Administrative district: Dmitrovsky District
- Town of district significanceSelsoviet: Dmitrovsk
- Founded: 1711
- Town status since: 1782
- Elevation: 200 m (660 ft)

Population (2010 Census)
  - Total: 5,648
  - Estimate (2023): 5,177 (−8.3%)

Administrative status
  - Capital of: Dmitrovsky District, town of district significance of Dmitrovsk

Municipal status
  - Municipal district: Dmitrovsky Municipal District
  - Urban settlement: Dmitrovsk Urban Settlement
  - Capital of: Dmitrovsky Municipal District, Dmitrovsk Urban Settlement
- Time zone: UTC+3 (MSK)
- Postal code: 303240
- OKTMO ID: 54612101001

Dmitrovsk (Russian: Дмитро́вск) is a town and the administrative center of Dmitrovsky District in Oryol Oblast, Russia, located on the Obshcheritsa River near its confluence with the Nerussa, 100 kilometers (62 mi) southwest of Oryol, the administrative center of the oblast. Population: 5,648 (2010 census); 6,492 (2002 census); 6,974 (1989 Soviet census).

It was previously known as Dmitriyevka, Dmitrovka (until 1929), Dmitrovsk-Orlovsky (until 2005).

== History ==
It was founded in 1711 as the village of Dmitriyevka (Дми́триевка). After a church was built there, it became a selo and was renamed Dmitrovka (Дмитровка). It was granted town status in 1782, and renamed Dmitrovsk-Orlovsky (Дмитровск-Орловский) in 1929. During World War II, Dmitrovsk-Orlovsky was occupied by the German Army from October 2, 1941 to August 12, 1943 and administered as part of the so-called Lokot Autonomy. In 2005, it received its present name of Dmitrovsk.

== Administrative and municipal status ==
Within the framework of administrative divisions, Dmitrovsk serves as the administrative center of Dmitrovsky District. As an administrative division, it is incorporated within Dmitrovsky District as the town of district significance of Dmitrovsk. As a municipal division, the town of district significance of Dmitrovsk is incorporated within Dmitrovsky Municipal District as Dmitrovsk Urban Settlement.
