= Snovianka, Chernihiv Oblast =

Snovianka Снов'уанка
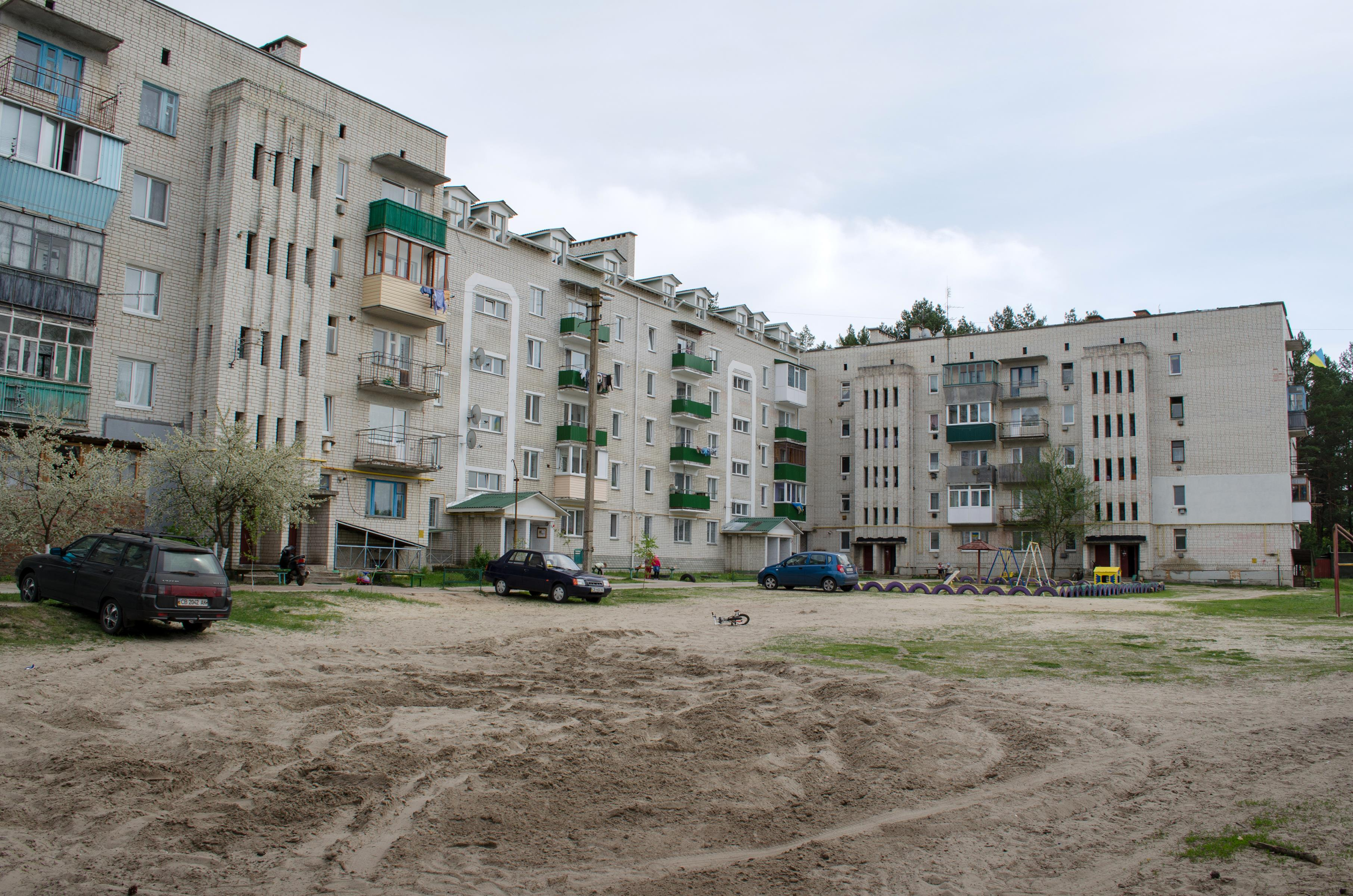

- Location within Chernihiv Oblast Location within Ukraine
- Coordinates: 51°33′35″N 31°34′05″E
- Founded: 1641
- Elevation: 122 m (400 ft)

Population
  - Total: 626
- Postal code: 15532
- Area code: + 462
- Website: None

Snovianka, or Snov'yanka (Ukrainian: Снов'янка) is a selo in Chernihiv Raion, Chernihiv Oblast of Ukraine, with a current population of 626. It belongs to Kyselivka rural hromada, one of the hromadas of Ukraine.

== History ==
The earliest evidence of human habitation in the area dates back to the Neolithic period, with the discovery of settlements and bronze artifacts.

During the Scythian period, the region was home to two distinct cultures, each leaving their mark in the form of hillforts and other archaeological sites. The area near Snovyanka has also yielded evidence of ancient Russian settlements and burial mounds.

The village of Snovianka, also known as Snov-Yanka, takes its name from the local legend of Yanka's daughter who drowned in the Snow River. The name Borky, which refers to the nearby forest, has been in use since 1641 and was once the property of Posudevskii. By 1782, the village had grown to include 25 houses, a distillery, and tar production.

During the 19th century, the destruction of forests led to the loose sand covering village graves, but the village continued to grow, with a population of 675 inhabitants and 96 yards at the crossing of the Snov River, according to the 1897 census. By 1924, the village had grown to include 108 yards and 538 inhabitants, with a population of 643 inhabitants today.

During the Soviet era, the village saw development, with the construction of several five-story buildings, a school, and kindergartens.

== Geography ==
The village is located near the confluence of the Snov and Desna.
