= Valentyn Kotyk =

Soviet pioneer and partisan scout during World War II (1930–1944)

Valentin Kotyk
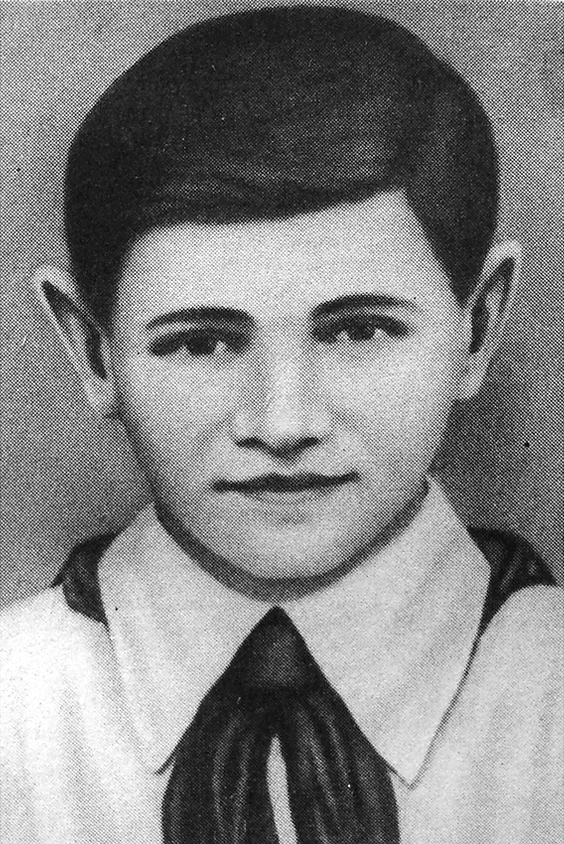
- Born: 11 February 1930; Khmelivka, Ukrainian SSR, Soviet Union
- Died: 17 February 1944 (aged 14); Iziaslav, Ukrainian SSR, Soviet Union
- Military career
- Allegiance: Soviet Union
- Awards: Hero of the Soviet Union

Valentyn Oleksandrovych "Valya" Kotyk (Russian: Валентин Александрович Котик, Валя Котик; 11 February 1930 – 17 February 1944) was a Soviet Pioneer, a partisan scout, and a pioneer-hero. He was the youngest-ever Hero of the Soviet Union.

During the German-Soviet War, he participated in the partisan movement in Ukraine. At first, he was an orderly but he later participated in fights, was wounded twice and finally was killed in action during the battle for Iziaslav. He received the Order of the Patriotic War 1st class and the Medal "Partisan of the Patriotic War".

In 1957, a film Orlyonok devoted to him was shot. In 1958, he posthumously received the rank of the Hero of Soviet Union. Later, a number of streets, pioneer teams, schools and steamships were named after him, and a number of monuments were erected.

In November 2022, as part of a derussification campaign, (the Ukrainian capital) Kyiv's Valentin Kotyk Street was renamed to Videnska (Vienna) street.
