= Obshcheritsa =

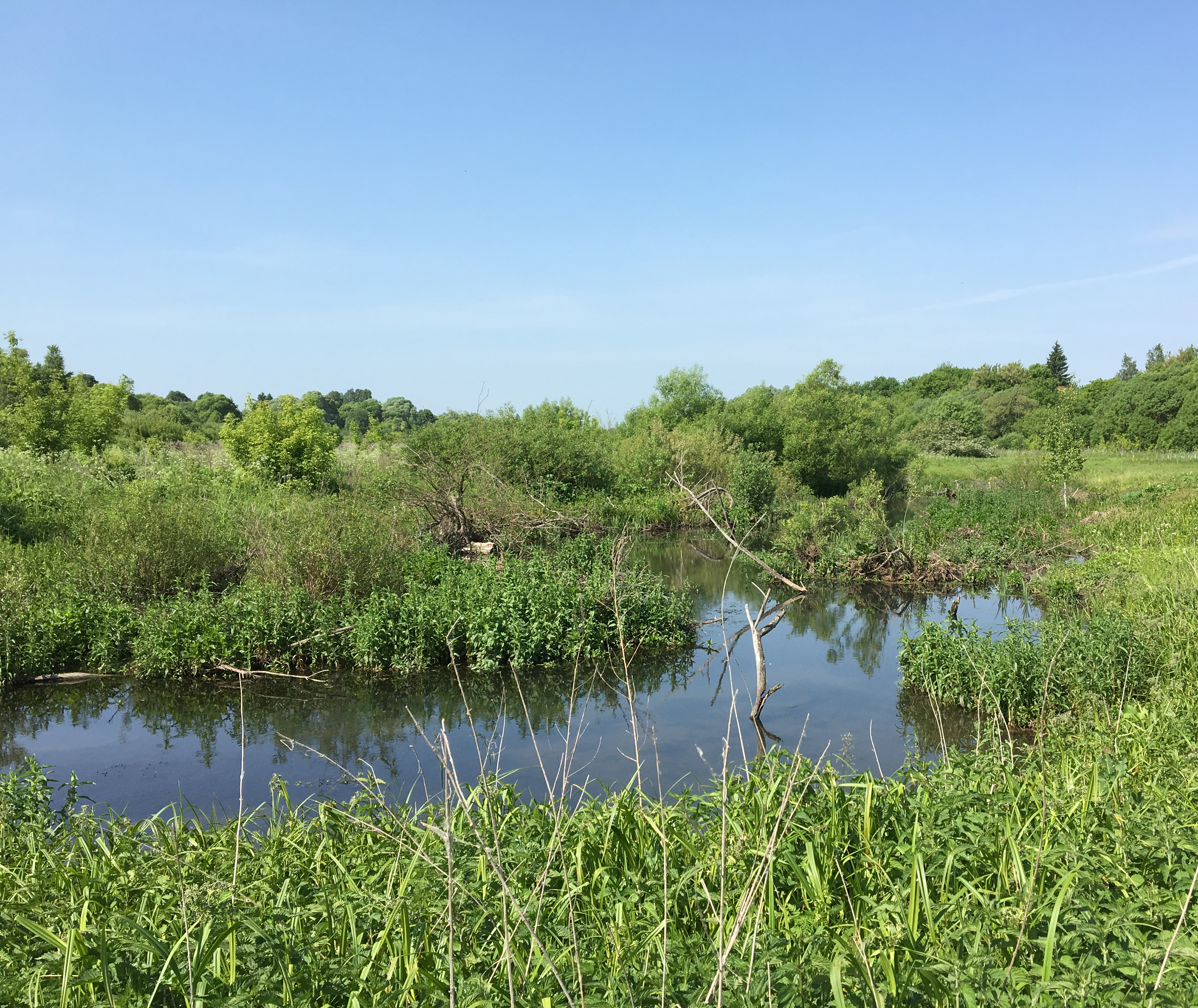

Location
- Country: Russia

Physical characteristics
- Mouth: Nerussa
  - coordinates: 52°31′14″N 35°07′05″E

Basin features
- Progression: Nerussa→ Desna→ Dnieper→ Dnieper–Bug estuary→ Black Sea

The Obshcheritsa (Russian: Общерица) is a river in Oryol Oblast, Russia. It is a left tributary of the Nerussa.
