= Marat Kazey =

Azərbaycan

Marat Ivanovich Kazey
- Born: 10 October 1929; Stankovo, Koidanova District, Minsk Region, Byelorussian SSR, USSR
- Died: 11 May 1944 (aged 14) Khoromitskie, Uzda District, Minsk Region, Byelorussian SSR, USSR
- Allegiance: Soviet Union
- Awards: Hero of the Soviet Union

Marat Ivanovich Kazey (Russian: Марат Иванович Казей, Belarusian: Марат Іванавіч Казей; 10 October 1929 in Stankovo village, Koidanova (now Dzyarzhynsk) District, Minsk Region, BSSR, USSR – 11 May 1944 in Khoromitskie village, Uzda District, Minsk Region, BSSR, USSR) was a Soviet partisan, scout, pioneer-hero, and posthumous Hero of the Soviet Union.

== Biography ==
His father Ivan Georgievich Kazey was a communist activist who served for 10 years in the Baltic Fleet. He did military service on the battleship Marat, after which he named his son Marat. Then he worked at the Dzerzhinsk machine-tractor station, headed the training courses for tractor drivers, was the chairman of the comrades court. In 1935 he was arrested for "sabotage", rehabilitated posthumously in 1959.

Mother Anna Aleksandrovna Kazey was also an activist, she was a member of the election commission for elections to the Supreme Soviet of the Soviet Union. Like her husband, she was subjected to reprisals, was arrested twice on charges of "Trotskyism", but was released. Despite the arrests, she continued to actively support the Soviet regime. During World War II, she hid wounded partisans and treated them, for which in 1942 she was hanged by the Germans in Minsk.

After the death of his mother, Marat and his older sister Ariadna in November 1942 went to the partisan detachment named after the 25th anniversary of October Revolution.

In the winter of 1943, when the detachment was breaking out of an encirclement, Ariadne Kazei received severe frostbite to her feet, and it was required to amputate both of her legs. She was to be evacuated to the Soviet rear, but her condition worsened, and the amputation was carried out in the field. Ariadne was evacuated by plane only on June 14, 1943. Marat, being underage, was asked to evacuate with his sister, but he refused and remained in the detachment.

Subsequently, Marat became a scout of the headquarters of the 200th partisan brigade named after. K. K. Rokossovsky under the command of brigade commander N. Yu. Baranov. In addition to reconnaissance, he participated in raids and sabotage. For gallantry and intrepidity in battle he was awarded the Order of the Patriotic War of the 1st degree, medals "For Courage" (being wounded, he raised the partisans to attack) and "For Battle Merit".

In March 1943, Marat is credited with saving the partisan detachment. When Germans attempting to clear the area of partisans surrounded them via a pincer movement near the village of Rumok, it was the scout Kazei who managed to break through the enemy's encirclement and lead another partisan detachment under D.A. Furmanov seven kilometers away to their aid.

== Last Stand ==
Returning from reconnaissance, Marat and the chief of intelligence of the headquarters of the partisan brigade, Mikhail Larin, arrived on horseback early in the morning in the village of Khoromitskie, where they were to meet with Viktor Kukharevich, a messenger of the partisans. Larin went to the messenger, and Marat went to rest at his acquaintances Aksenchiks. Less than half an hour later, the battle began. The village was surrounded by the troops from SS Sonderregiment Dirlewanger and the policemen. In the shootout, Larin died almost immediately. Marat managed to get to the bush at the edge of the forest. He fought to the last bullet, and then took up his last weapon - two grenades. He threw one at the Germans. The Germans, despite the losses, wanted to take him alive. When the Germans came close, Marat blew himself up with them with a second grenade, when they came very close. There are two versions: according to one version, Marat blew himself up and the Germans approaching him. According to another version, Marat deliberately blew only himself, so as not to give the Nazis a reason for a punitive operation in the village of Khoromitskie.

== Memory ==
- Minsk:
  - In 1959, a monument to Marat Kazei (sculptor Selikhanov and architect Volchek) was erected in the Pionersky Park in Minsk, and in 1960 the park itself was named Marat Kazei Square
  - In the Kastrychnitski District of Minsk there is a street named after Marat Kazey.
  - The bust of Marat Kazei was installed in the courtyard of the gymnasium number 25 named after Rimma Shershneva (Sedova street, 3).
- The first monument to Marat was installed at the place of his death, at the edge of the forest. It says: "Here on May 11, 1944, partisans Marat Kazey and Larin were killed."
- The pioneer camp "Marat Kazei", which is located in the village of Gorval (Rechytsa District, Gomel Region), is named in his honor, and his bust is also installed there.
- In the village of Stankovo (Dzerzhinsky district, Minsk region), a memorial obelisk was installed (opened in October 1958), and a local school was named after him.
- In Dzerzhinsk (Minsk region) on the Alley of Heroes on Dzerzhinsky Square there is a memorial sign.
- A bust of Marat Kazei was installed on the territory of the Lesnaya Skazka children's health camp in the Oreshniki settlement (Zavyalovsky district, Udmurtia)/
- A bust of Marat Kazei was installed on the territory of the Elektronik children's health camp in the village of Snovyanka (Chernihiv Raion, Chernihiv Oblast, Ukraine.
- In the village of Yagodnoye, near Tolyatti, on the territory of the former pioneer camp «Алые паруса» ("Scarlet Sails"), a monument to Marat Kazei was installed.
- In Moscow, on the territory of the Exhibition of Achievements of National Economy, a bust by the sculptor N. Kongiser is installed at the entrance to Pavilion No. 8.
- Marat Kazey served as a prototype for the character of the Russian-Japanese-Canadian animated fantasy film "First Squad".
- In Simferopol, on the Alley of Heroes in the Children's Park, a monument to Marat Kazey was installed.
- In 1968 the cargo ship DVMP was named in the name of Marat Kazey.
- The writer Vyacheslav Morozov wrote several books about the exploit of Marat Kazey.
- In 2015, the bas-relief of Marat Kazei was installed on the Alley of Pioneer Heroes (Ulyanovsk).

== Awards ==
- Medal Gold Star Hero of the Soviet Union (08.05.1965);
- Order of Lenin (08.05.1965);
- Order of the Patriotic War First Class;
- Medal "For Courage" (Russia)
- Medal "For Battle Merit".

== Sources ==
- Герои Советского Союза: Краткий биографический словарь / Пред. ред. коллегии И. Н. Шкадов. — М.: Воениздат, 1987. — Т. 1 /Абаев — Любичев/. — 911 с. — 100 000 экз. — ISBN отс., Рег. № в РКП 87-95382
