= Pogar (urban-type settlement) =

Pogar Погар
- Town
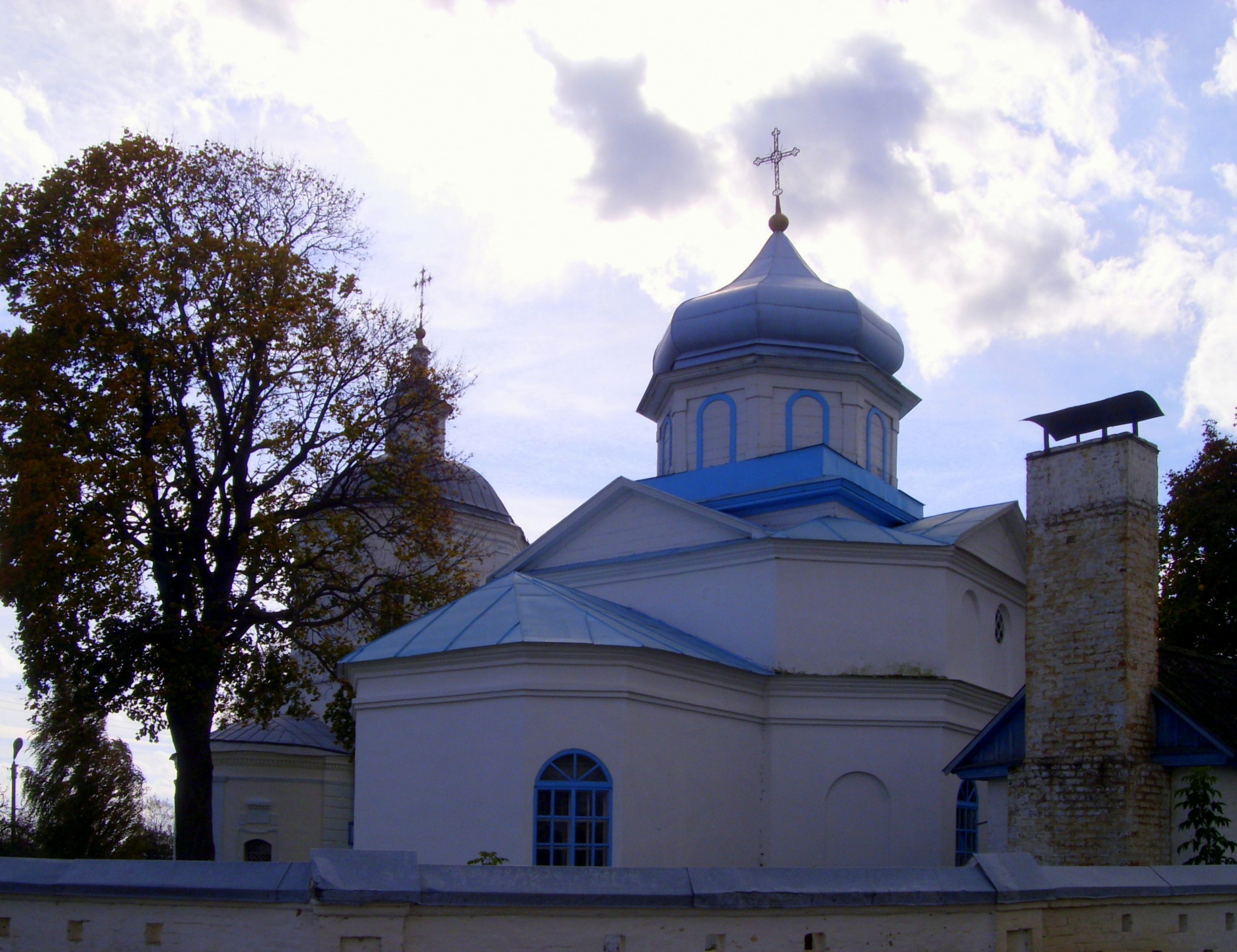

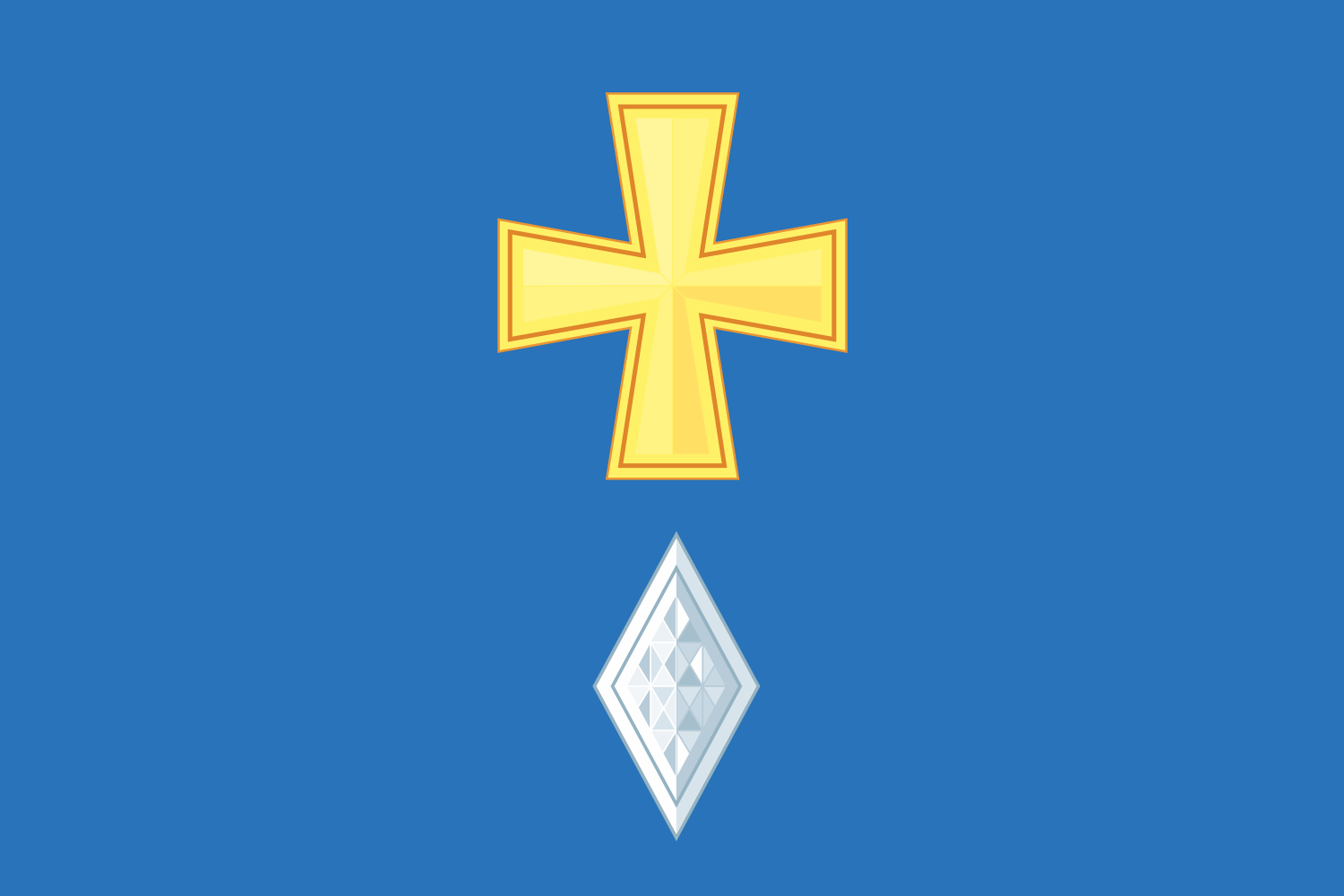
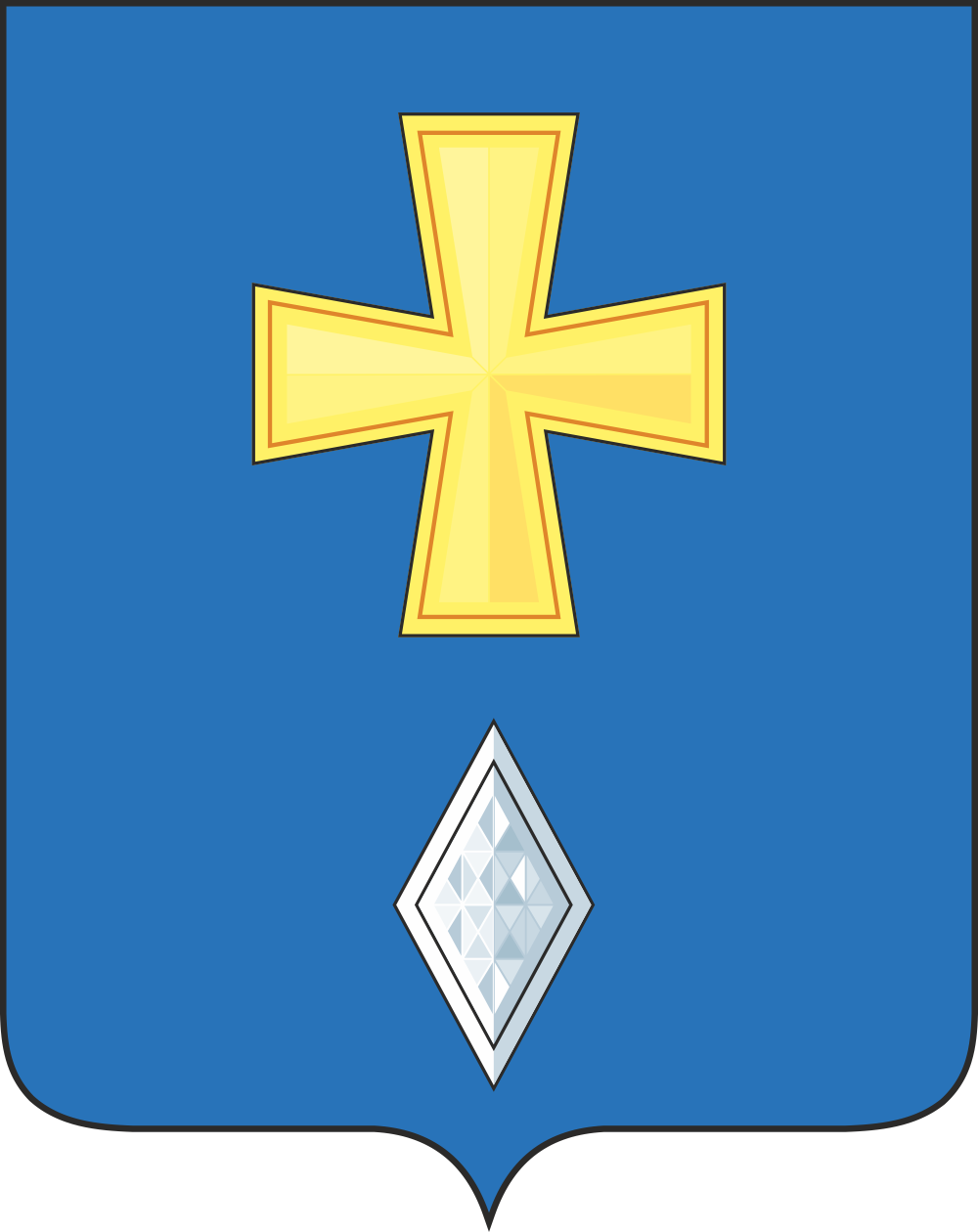
- Flag Coat of arms
- Interactive map of Pogar
- Location of Pogar Pogar (Bryansk Oblast)
- Coordinates: 52°33′00″N 33°15′00″E
- Country: Russia
- Federal subject: Bryansk Oblast
- Radosh, Radogosh: 1155
- Town status since: 1938

Population (2010 Census)
  - Total: 9,990
  - Estimate (2025): 9,388 (−6%)

Municipal status
  - Municipal district: Pogarsky Municipal District
  - Urban settlement: Pogarsky Urban Settlement
  - Capital of: Pogarsky Municipal District, Pogarsky Urban Settlement
- Time zone: UTC+3 (MSK)
- Postal code: 243550
- Dialing code: +7 48349
- OKTMO ID: 15642151051

Pogar (Russian: Пога́р) is an Urban-type settlement in Bryansk Oblast, Russia. It is the administrative center of Pogarsky District. Population: 9,484 (2021 census); 9,990 (2010 census); 11,471 (2002 census); 9,959 (1989 Soviet census).

Located on Sudost River, a tributary of the Desna River, 7 km from the Pogar railway station and 128 km south-west of Bryansk, the administrative center of the region.

== History ==
Pogar is one of the oldest settlements of the Russian Federation. According to archeological data, the first Slavic settlement in this place appeared in the 8th-9th centuries. In 1155 locality was first mentioned as an urban settlement Radosch later Radogosch. In the late 1230s it was ravaged by the Mongols. [2]

In the second half of the 14th century, the town passed into the possession of Lithuania. In the years 1500-1618 was an under the rule of the Russian state. In the autumn of 1534 the governor of Kiev Andrey Nemirovich Radogosch burned, but he was unable to take Starodub and Chernigov. After the destruction of Radogoscha by the Lithuanians in 1563, the population fled; On the site of the former population remained only long mound.

The exact reappearance of the town is unknown but by that time the town already bore the name of Pogar. In 1618 it was captured by Poland, before joining the left-bank Ukraine, which after 1654 became part of the Russian state. Before elimination of regimental divisions by Catherine II in 1783, it remained part of the autonomous Hetmanate of Ukraine and was included into the Pogar hundred of Starodub Regiment.

From the middle of the 17th century the settlement was called "Pogar" and received Magdeburg Law. The town was famous for its fairs. Since 1781 it was a county town of Novgorod-Seversky Governorate, which was dissolved in 1796. Until 1929 was part of the Starodub district, where it was the parish center.

In 1910, the cigar factory of merchant Shepfer was transferred to the town of Pochep. In the years 1913-1915, there was one more tobacco company - cigar factory AG Rutenberg.

In 1918, during the Austro-German occupation of Starodub, Pogar was given temporary county center status.

On May 25, 1919, Pohar was transferred to the category of settlements of rural type (Russian: поселений сельского типа), and on July 10, 1938 it was granted an urban-type settlement status.

It is the only population center of the municipality Pogarsky urban settlement.
