= Nerussa (river) =

River in Russia

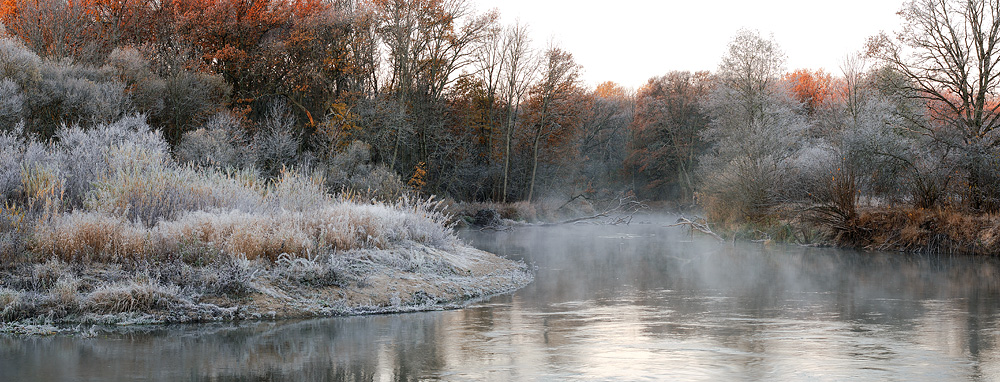
- Native name: Нерусса (Russian)

Location
- Country: Russia

Physical characteristics
- Mouth: Desna
  - coordinates: 52.5488°N 33.7768°E
- Length: 161 km (100 mi)
- Basin size: 5,630 km^{2} (2,170 sq mi)

Basin features
- Progression: Desna→ Dnieper→ Dnieper–Bug estuary→ Black Sea
- Tributaries
  - left: Obshcheritsa

The Nerussa (Russian: Нерусса) is a river in the Oryol and Bryansk oblasts of Russia. It is a left tributary of the Desna. It is 161 kilometres (100 mi) long, and has a drainage basin of 5,630 square kilometres (2,170 sq mi). The river flows through the town of Dmitrovsk.
