= Gateliai =

- Village
- Location within Lithuania
- Coordinates: 55.545°N 25.958°E
- Country: Lithuania
- County: Utena County

Population
  - Total: 26
- Time zone: Eastern European Time (UTC+2)
  - Summer (DST): Eastern European Summer Time (UTC+3)

Gateliai is a village in Utena District Municipality, Utena County, Lithuania. The population was 26 in 2011.
