= Tochka, Vologda Oblast =

Tochka Точка
- Village
- Location within Vologda Oblast Location within Russia
- Coordinates: 59°03′N 39°05′E
- Country: Russia
- Region: Vologda Oblast
- District: Sheksninsky District
- Time zone: UTC+3:00

Tochka (Russian: Точка) is a rural locality (a village) in Domshinskoye Rural Settlement, Sheksninsky District, Vologda Oblast, Russia. The population was 1 as of 2002.

== Geography ==
Tochka is located 50 km southeast of Sheksna (the district's administrative centre) by road. Gorodskoye is the nearest rural locality.
