= Pogar, Vareš =

Village in Vareš, Bosnia and Herzegovina

Pogar
- Village
- Location within Bosnia and Herzegovina
- Coordinates: 44.1974569°N 18.3145372°E
- Country: Bosnia and Herzegovina
- Entity: Federation of Bosnia and Herzegovina
- Canton: Zenica-Doboj
- Municipality: Vareš

Area
  - Total: 4.36 sq mi (11.28 km^{2})

Population (2013)
  - Total: 139
  - Density: 31.9/sq mi (12.3/km^{2})
- Time zone: UTC+1 (CET)
  - Summer (DST): UTC+2 (CEST)

Pogar is a village in the municipality of Vareš, Bosnia and Herzegovina.

== Demographics ==
According to the 2013 census, its population was 139, all Croats.
