= Pogarsky District =

Pogarsky District Погарский район (Russian)
- District
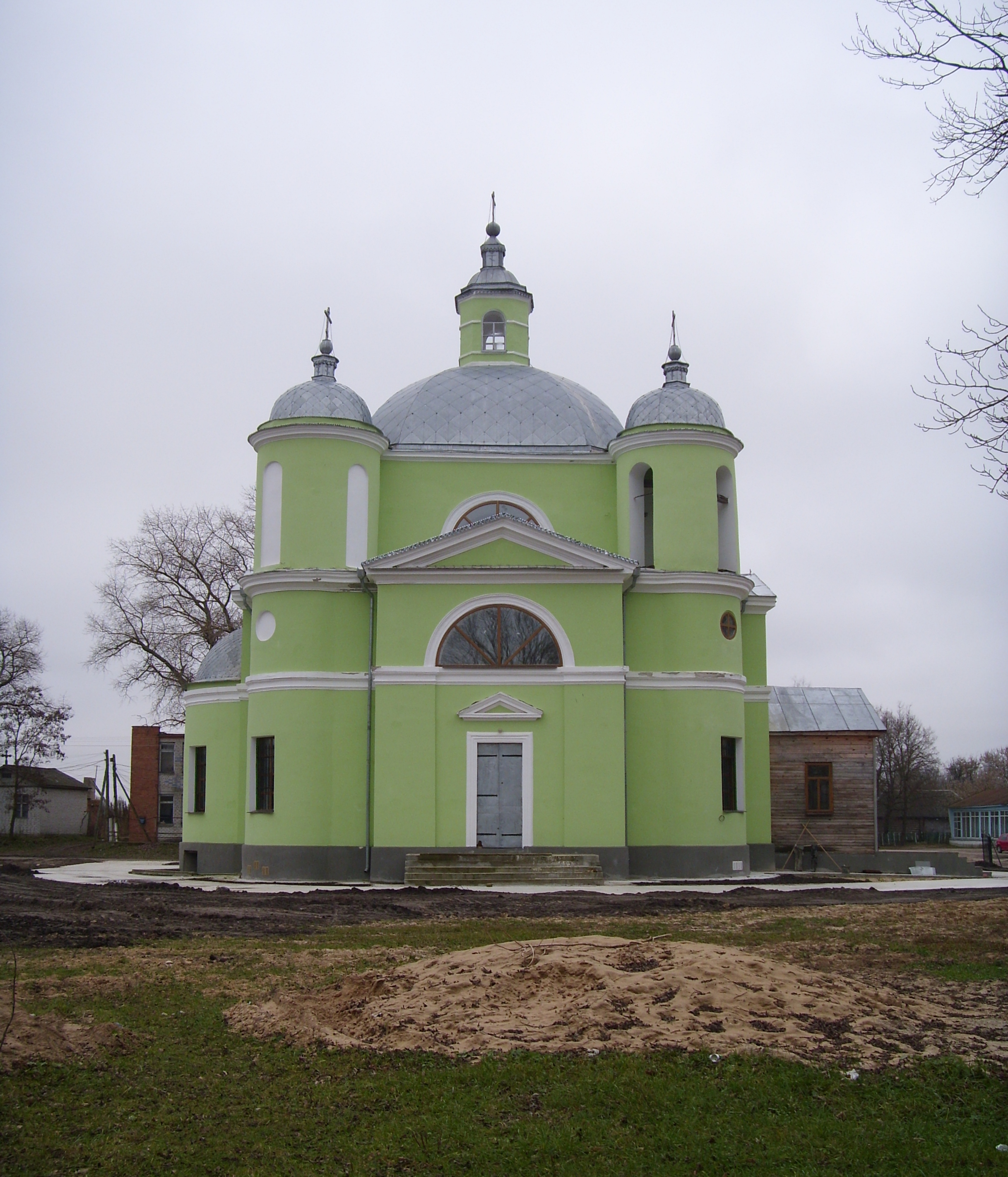
- The Trinity Church, Grinyovo (1802)

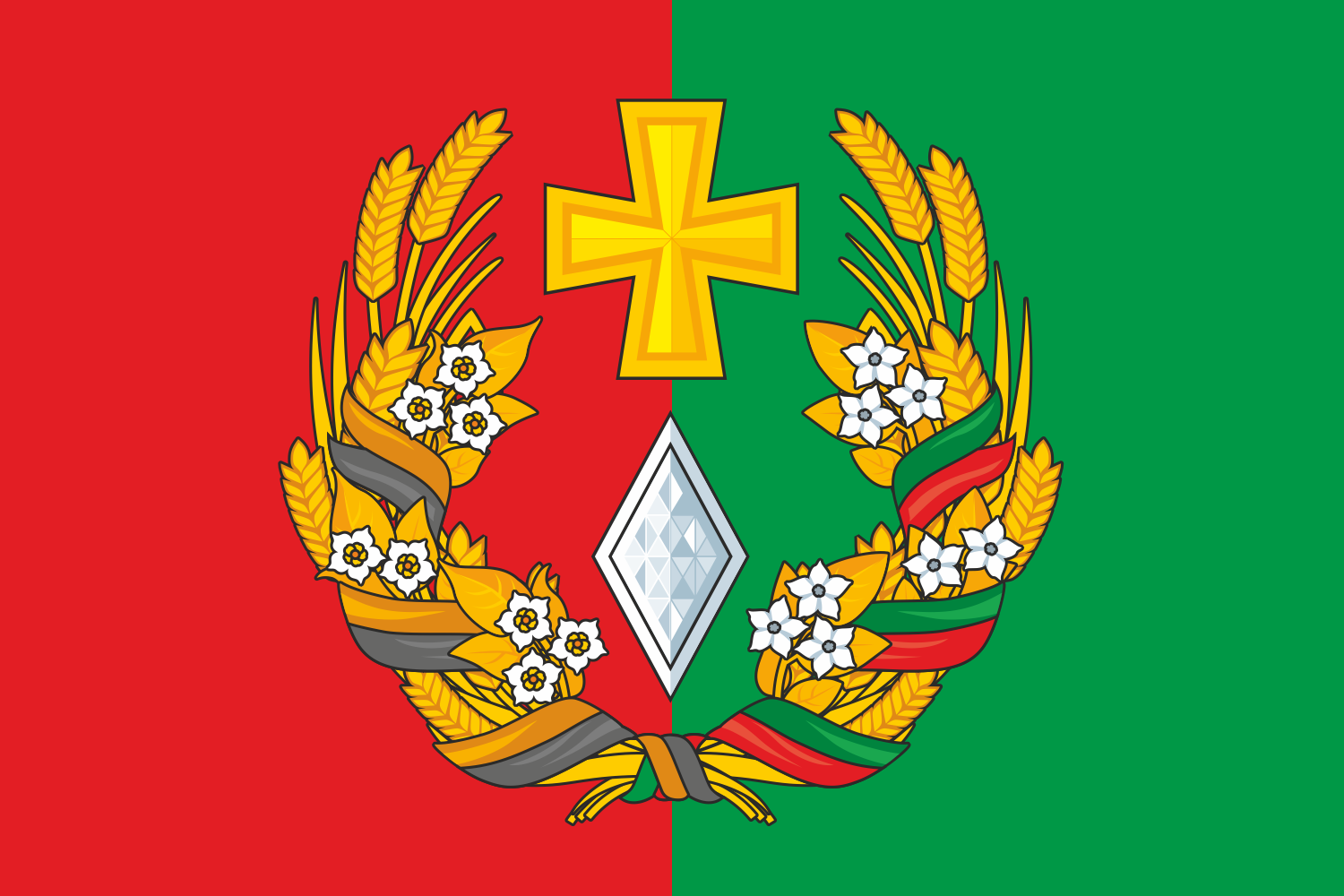
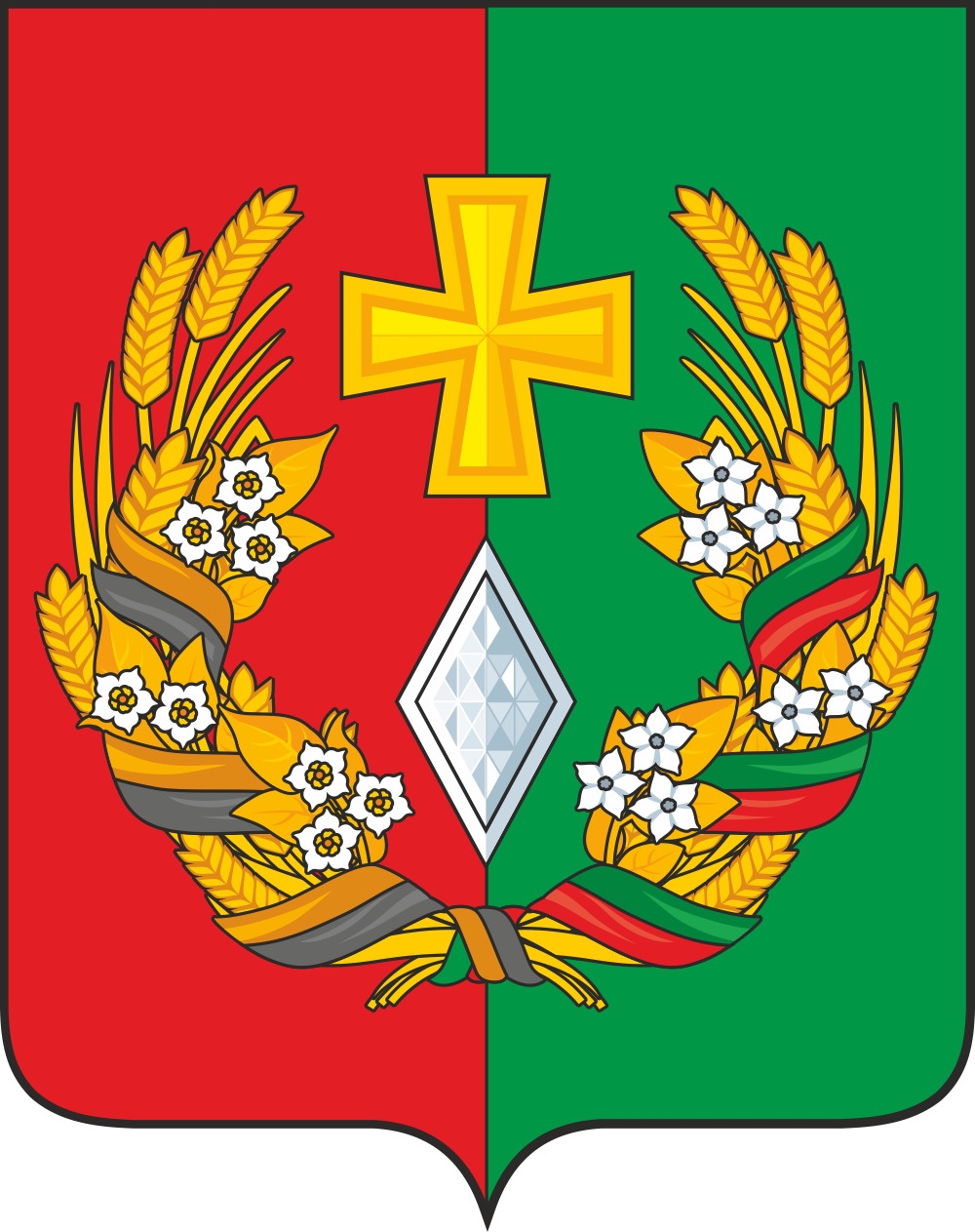
- Flag Coat of arms
- Location of Pogarsky District in Bryansk Oblast
- Coordinates: 52°33′N 33°15′E
- Country: Russia
- Federal subject: Bryansk Oblast
- Administrative center: Pogar

Area
  - Total: 1,196 km^{2} (462 sq mi)

Population (2010 Census)
  - Total: 28,333
  - Density: 23.69/km^{2} (61.36/sq mi)
  - Urban: 35.3%
  - Rural: 64.7%

Administrative structure
  - Administrative divisions: 1 Settlement administrative okrugs, 14 Rural administrative okrugs
  - Inhabited localities: 1 urban-type settlements, 119 rural localities

Municipal structure
  - Municipally incorporated as: Pogarsky Municipal District
  - Municipal divisions: 1 urban settlements, 14 rural settlements
- Time zone: UTC+3 (MSK)
- OKTMO ID: 15642000
- Website: http://www.pogaradm.ru/

Pogarsky District (Russian: Пога́рский райо́н) is an administrative and municipal district (raion), one of the twenty-seven in Bryansk Oblast, Russia. It is located in the south of the oblast. The area of the district is 1,196 square kilometers (462 sq mi). Its administrative center is the urban locality (a work settlement) of Pogar. Population: 29,424 (2021 census); 28,333 (2010 census); 35,588 (2002 Census); 37,523 (1989 Soviet census). The population of Pogar accounts for 32.2% of the district's total population.

== People ==
- Sol Hurok (1888-1974)
