= Kotelnichsky Uyezd =

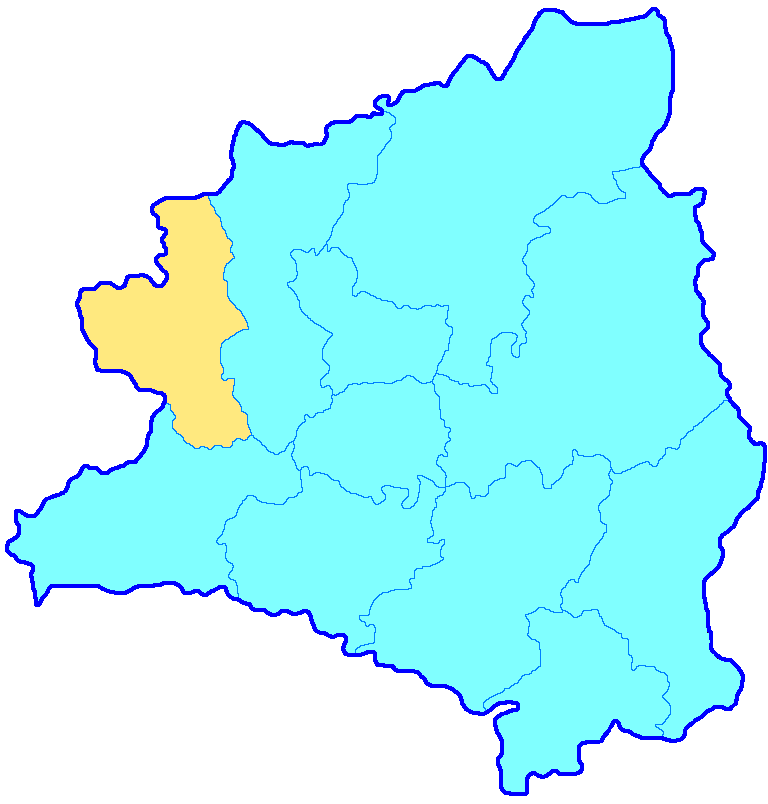
Kotelnichsky Uyezd on the map of Vyatka province

Kotelnichsky Uyezd (Котельничский уезд) was one of the subdivisions of the Vyatka Governorate of the Russian Empire. It was situated in the western part of the governorate. Its administrative centre was Kotelnich.

== Demographics ==
At the time of the Russian Empire Census of 1897, Kotelnichsky Uyezd had a population of 276,749. Of these, 99.7% spoke Russian and 0.2% Mari as their native language.
