= Sudost =

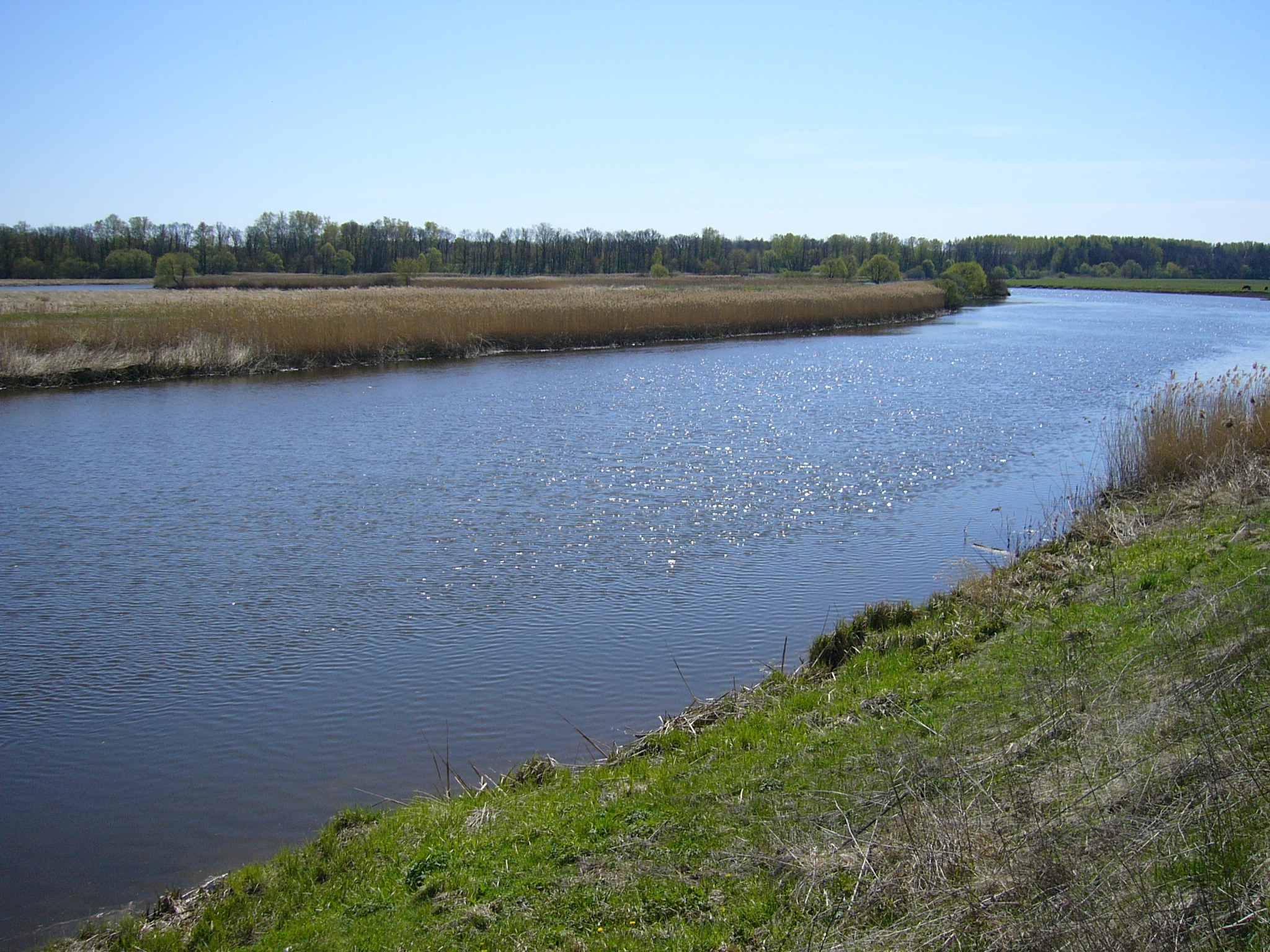
- Sudost River
- Native name: Судость (Russian)

Location
- Country: Russia, Ukraine

Physical characteristics
- Source
  - location: Bryansk Oblast, Russia
- Mouth: Desna
  - coordinates: 52°19′56″N 33°23′54″E
- Length: 208 km (129 mi)
- Basin size: 5,850 km^{2} (2,260 sq mi)

Basin features
- Progression: Desna→ Dnieper→ Dnieper–Bug estuary→ Black Sea

The Sudost (Russian: Судость; Ukrainian: Судость) is a river in Bryansk Oblast in Russia and Chernihiv Oblast in Ukraine. It is a right tributary of the Desna. Some sections of the river form the Russia–Ukraine border.

The length of the Sudost is 208 kilometers (129 mi). The area of its basin is approximately 5,850 square kilometers (2,260 sq mi). The river freezes up in November and December, and stays icebound until late March–early April.

The town of Pochep and the urban-type settlement of Pogar stand on the river.
