= Snov =

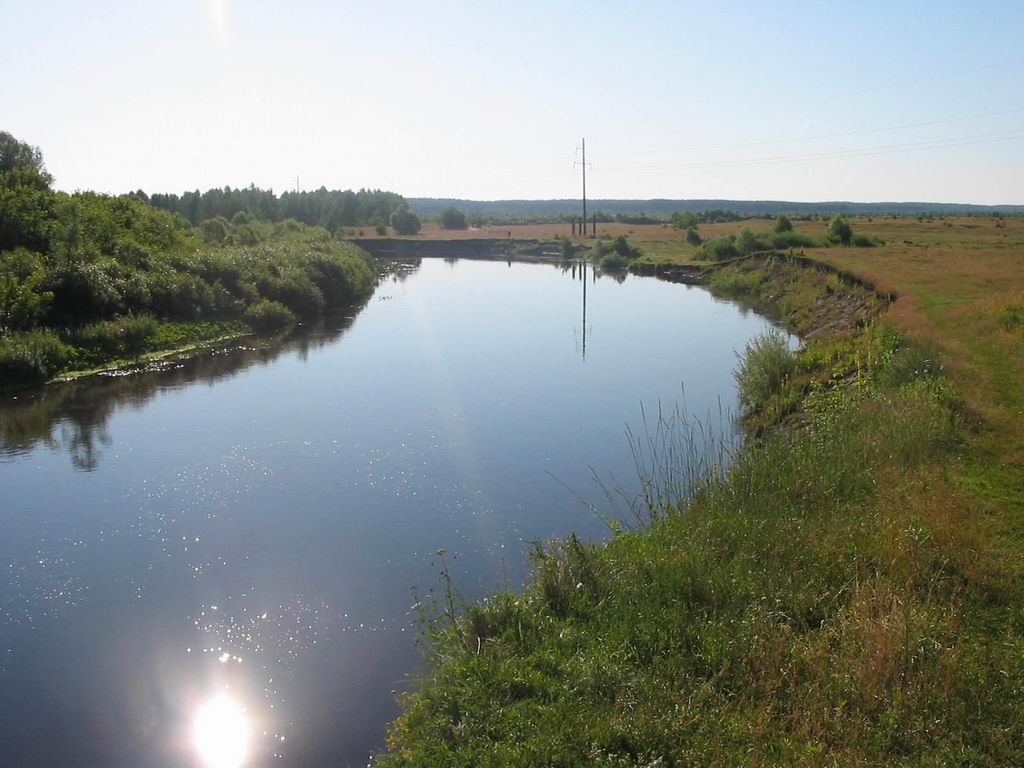
- Native name: Снов

Location
- Country: Russia, Ukraine

Physical characteristics
- Mouth: Desna
  - coordinates: 51°31′48″N 31°31′52″E
- Length: 253 km (157 mi)
- Basin size: 8,700 km^{2} (3,400 sq mi)

Basin features
- Progression: Desna→ Dnieper→ Dnieper–Bug estuary→ Black Sea

The Snov (Russian: Снов; Ukrainian: Снов) is a river in Bryansk Oblast in Russia and Chernihiv Oblast in Ukraine, right tributary of the Desna River (Dnieper basin).

The length of the river is 253 km. The area of its drainage basin is 8,700 km^{2}. The Snov freezes up in November - late January and stays icebound until March - early April. Part of the river forms the Russia–Ukraine border.

According to Ruthenian chronicles, in 1068 at Snov River took place a battle between Duke of Chernihiv Sviatoslav Yaroslavich and Cumans led by their Duke Sharukan.

== Cities and towns on the Snov ==
- Snovsk, Ukraine
