= Desna (river) =

River in Russia and Ukraine

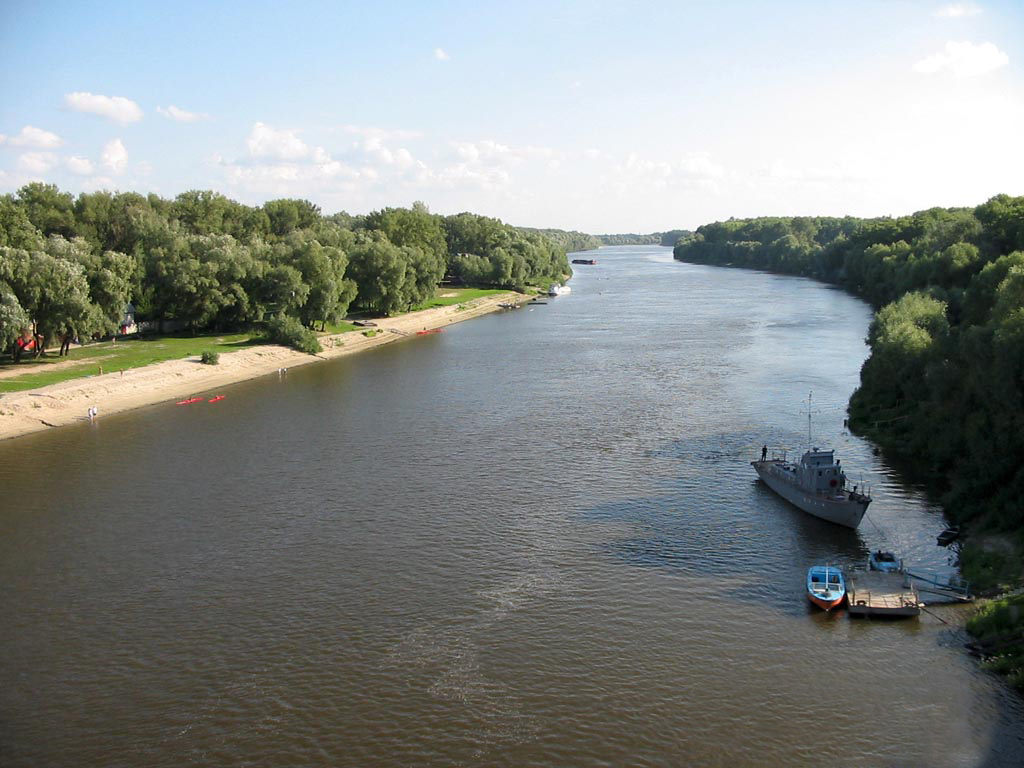
- The Desna flows through Chernihiv, Ukraine.

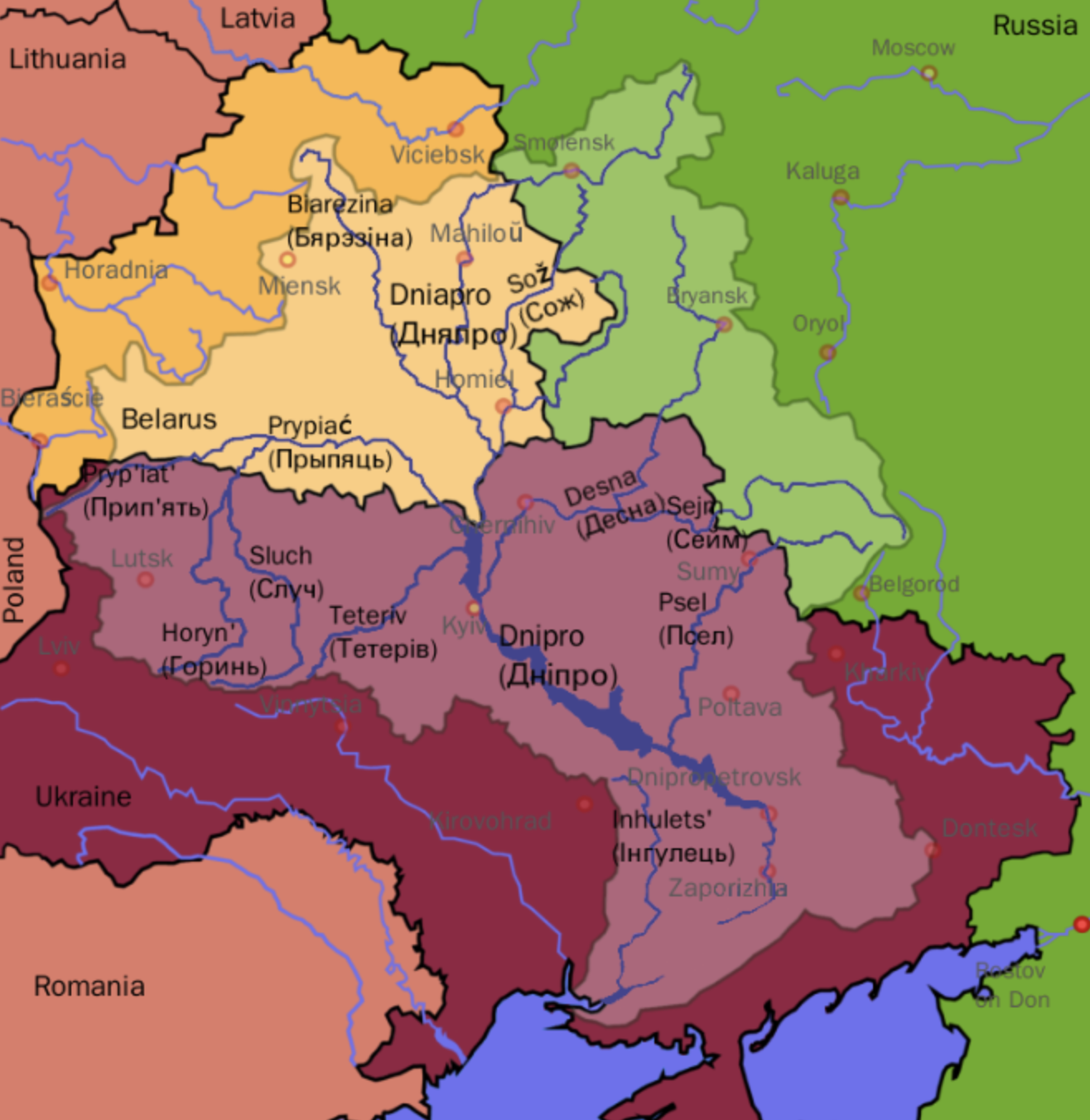
- The Dnieper and the Desna rivers' drainage basin. In this map, Belarus is shown in yellow, Russia in green and Ukraine in deep red.
- Native name: Десна (Russian); Десна (Ukrainian)

Location
- Country: Russia, Ukraine
- Cities: Bryansk, Novhorod-Siverskyi, Chernihiv, Kyiv

Physical characteristics
- Source
  - location: Smolensk Upland, Russia
  - coordinates: 54°35′16″N 33°17′32″E
- Mouth: Desna Delta, Dnieper
  - location: just north of Kyiv, Ukraine
  - coordinates: 50°33′02″N 30°32′21″E
- Length: 1,130 km (700 mi)
- Basin size: 88,900 km^{2} (34,300 sq mi)
- Discharge
  - location: Kyiv
  - average: 360 m^{3}/s (13,000 cu ft/s)

Basin features
- Progression: Dnieper→ Dnieper–Bug estuary→ Black Sea
- Tributaries
  - left: Seym, Oster
  - right: Sudost

The Desna (Russian and Ukrainian: Десна) is a river in Russia and Ukraine, a major left-tributary of the Dnieper. Its name in Old East Slavic: деснъ means lit. "right hand". It has a length of 1,130 km (702 mi), and its drainage basin covers 88,900 km^{2} (34,324 sq mi).

In Ukraine, the river's width ranges from 60 to 250 metres (200 to 820 ft), with its average depth being 3 m (10 ft). The mean annual discharge at its mouth is 360 m^{3}/s (13,000 cu ft/s). The river freezes over from early December to early April, and is navigable from Novhorod-Siverskyi to its mouth, a length of about 535 km (332 mi).

The water level of the river reached its lowest recorded point in 140 years in June 2020. This water level was 5 m (16 ft) below normal for that time of year.

== Geography ==
=== Course ===
The Desna originates in the Smolensk Heights of Smolensk Oblast, Russia. The river's source lies in Yelninsky District, east-southeast from the city of Smolensk and not far from Yelnya in a forest near the village of Naleti. The Desna then flows south through a low and swampy valley toward the city of Bryansk, where the river's right bank rises.

After its confluence with the Seym near the Russian-Ukrainian border, the river then widens, splitting into numerous smaller branches. Its right bank declines again near the city of Chernihiv, and again near one of its tributaries, the Oster, where the Desna continues its course through a low, muddy plain until it finally reaches its mouth near Kyiv at the Dnieper River.

=== Tributaries ===
The Desna has many tributaries. The most significant (length more than 100 km) are, from source to mouth:

- Vetma (left)
- Bolva (left)
- Navlya (left)
- Nerussa (left)
- Sudost (right)
- Ubid (right)
- Seym (left)
- Snov (right)
- Oster (left)

=== Cities and towns on the Desna ===
- Yelnya, Russia
- Desnogorsk, Russia
- Zhukovka, Russia
- Seltso, Russia
- Bryansk, Russia
- Trubchevsk, Russia
- Novhorod-Siverskyi, Ukraine
- Chernihiv, Ukraine
- Oster, Ukraine
- Kyiv, Ukraine
- Snov'yanka, Ukraine

The Svensky Monastery is located at the confluence of the Desna and the Sven River.

== See also ==
- List of rivers of Russia
- List of rivers of Ukraine
