= Administrative divisions of Chelyabinsk Oblast =

Divisions of Chelyabinsk Oblast, Russia

Chelyabinsk Oblast Russia
- Administrative centre: Chelyabinsk

Administrative structure (as of 2015)
- Districts: 27
- Cities/towns: 30
- Urban-type settlements: 13
- Selsovets: 242

Municipal structure (as of 2002)
- Rural settlements: 1,260 (inhabited); 24 (uninhabited)

Chelyabinsk Oblast is a federal subject of Russia situated within the Ural Mountains region. As of 2015 it contains 30 cities or towns and is divided into 27 districts, 13 urban-type settlements and 242 selsovets. As of 2002, there are also 1260 rural localities and 24 uninhabited rural localities.

Map of Chelyabinsk Oblast (with numbered and numerical number)

== Administrative and municipal divisions ==
Map

| Division | | Structure | | OKATO | OKTMO | Urban-type settlement/ district-level town* | Rural (selsovet) |
| Division | | Administrative | Municipal | OKATO | OKTMO | Urban-type settlement/ district-level town* | Rural (selsovet) |
|---|---|---|---|---|---|---|---|
| Tryokhgorny (Трёхгорный) | | city (ZATO) | urban okrug | 75 507 | 75 707 | | |
| Ozyorsk (Озёрск) | | city (ZATO) | urban okrug | 75 543 | 75 743 | | |
| Snezhinsk (Снежинск) | | city (ZATO) | urban okrug | 75 545 | 75 746 | | |
| Lokomotivny (Локомотивный) | | urban-type settlement (ZATO) | urban okrug | 75 558 | 75 759 | | |
| Chelyabinsk (Челябинск) | | city | urban okrug | 75 401 | 75 701 | | |
| ↳ | Kalininsky (Калининский) | (under Chelyabinsk) | —N/a | 75 401 | —N/a | | |
| ↳ | Kurchatovsky (Курчатовский) | (under Chelyabinsk) | —N/a | 75 401 | —N/a | | |
| ↳ | Leninsky (Ленинский) | (under Chelyabinsk) | —N/a | 75 401 | —N/a | | |
| ↳ | Metallurgichesky (Металлургический) | (under Chelyabinsk) | —N/a | 75 401 | —N/a | | |
| ↳ | Sovetsky (Советский) | (under Chelyabinsk) | —N/a | 75 401 | —N/a | | |
| ↳ | Traktorozavodsky (Тракторозаводский) | (under Chelyabinsk) | —N/a | 75 401 | —N/a | | |
| ↳ | Tsentralny (Центральный) | (under Chelyabinsk) | —N/a | 75 401 | —N/a | | |
| Asha (Аша) | | city | (under Kunashaksky) | 75 403 | 75 636 | | |
| Verkhny Ufaley (Верхний Уфалей) | | city | urban okrug | 75 406 | 75 706 | | |
| Yemanzhelinsk (Еманжелинск) | | city | (under Yemanzhelinsky) | 75 409 | 75 619 | | |
| Zlatoust (Златоуст) | | city | urban okrug | 75 412 | 75 712 | | |
| Karabash (Карабаш) | | city | urban okrug | 75 415 | 75 715 | | |
| Kartaly (Карталы) | | city | (under Kartalinsky) | 75 418 | 75 623 | | |
| Kasli (Касли) | | city | (under Kaslinsky) | 75 421 | 75 626 | | |
| Katav-Ivanovsk (Катав-Ивановск) | | city | (under Katav-Ivanovsky) | 75 424 | 75 629 | | |
| Kopeysk (Копейск) | | city | urban okrug | 75 428 | 75 728 | | |
| Korkino (Коркино) | | city | (under Korkinsky) | 75 431 | 75 633 | | |
| Kyshtym (Кыштым) | | city | urban okrug | 75 434 | 75 734 | | |
| Magnitogorsk (Магнитогорск) | | city | urban okrug | 75 438 | 75 738 | | |
| ↳ | Leninsky (Ленинский) | (under Magnitogorsk) | —N/a | 75 438 | —N/a | | |
| ↳ | Ordzhonikidzevsky (Орджоникидзевский) | (under Magnitogorsk) | —N/a | 75 438 | —N/a | | |
| ↳ | Pravoberezhny (Правобережный) | (under Magnitogorsk) | —N/a | 75 438 | —N/a | | |
| Miass (Миасс) | | city | urban okrug | 75 442 | 75 742 | | |
| Plast (Пласт) | | city | (under Plastovsky) | 75 445 | 75 648 | | |
| Satka (Сатка) | | city | (under Satkinsky) | 75 448 | 75 649 | | |
| Troitsk (Троицк) | | city | urban okrug | 75 452 | 75 752 | | |
| Ust-Katav (Усть-Катав) | | city | urban okrug | 75 455 | 75 755 | | |
| Chebarkul (Чебаркуль) | | city | urban okrug | 75 458 | 75 758 | | |
| Yuzhnouralsk (Южноуральск) | | city | urban okrug | 75 464 | 75 764 | | |
| Agapovsky (Агаповский) | | district | | 75 203 | 75 603 | | 10 |
| Argayashsky (Аргаяшский) | | district | | 75 206 | 75 606 | | 12 |
| Ashinsky (Ашинский) | | district | | 75 209 | 75 609 | Minyar (Миньяр) town*; Sim (Сим) town*; Kropachyovo (Кропачёво) | 5 |
| Bredinsky (Брединский) | | district | | 75 212 | 75 612 | | 11 |
| Varnensky (Варненский) | | district | | 75 214 | 75 614 | | 13 |
| Verkhneuralsky (Верхнеуральский) | | district | | 75 217 | 75 617 | Verkhneuralsk (Верхнеуральск) town*; Mezhozyorny (Межозёрный) | 8 |
| Yemanzhelinsky (Еманжелинский) | | district | | 75 219 | 75 619 | Krasnogorsky (Красногорский); Zauralsky (Зауральский) | |
| Yetkulsky (Еткульский) | | district | | 75 220 | 75 620 | | 12 |
| Kartalinsky (Карталинский) | | district | | 75 223 | 75 623 | | 10 |
| Kaslinsky (Каслинский) | | district | | 75 226 | 75 626 | Vishnyovogorsk (Вишнёвогорск) | 9 |
| Katav-Ivanovsky (Катав-Ивановский) | | district | | 75 229 | 75 629 | Yuryuzan (Юрюзань) town* | 7 |
| Kizilsky (Кизильский) | | district | | 75 232 | 75 632 | | 14 |
| Korkinsky (Коркинский) | | district | | 75 233 | 75 633 | Pervomaysky (Первомайский); Roza (Роза) | |
| Krasnoarmeysky (Красноармейский) | | district | | 75 234 | 75 634 | | 15 |
| Kunashaksky (Кунашакский) | | district | | 75 236 | 75 636 | | 9 |
| Kusinsky (Кусинский) | | district | | 75 238 | 75 638 | Kusa (Куса) town*; Magnitka (Магнитка) | 3 |
| Nagaybaksky (Нагайбакский) | | district | | 75 242 | 75 642 | Yuzhny (Южный) | 9 |
| Nyazepetrovsky (Нязепетровский) | | district | | 75 244 | 75 644 | Nyazepetrovsk (Нязепетровск) town* | 4 |
| Oktyabrsky (Октябрьский) | | district | | 75 247 | 75 647 | | 13 |
| Plastovsky (Пластовский) | | district | | 75 248 | 75 648 | | 4 |
| Satkinsky (Саткинский) | | district | | 75 249 | 75 649 | Bakal (Бакал) town*; Berdyaush (Бердяуш); Mezhevoy (Межевой); Suleya (Сулея) | 3 |
| Sosnovsky (Сосновский) | | district | | 75 252 | 75 652 | | 16 |
| Troitsky (Троицкий) | | district | | 75 254 | 75 654 | | 25 |
| Uvelsky (Увельский) | | district | | 75 255 | 75 655 | | 10 |
| Uysky (Уйский) | | district | | 75 256 | 75 656 | | 11 |
| Chebarkulsky (Чебаркульский) | | district | | 75 257 | 75 657 | | 9 |
| Chesmensky (Чесменский) | | district | | 75 259 | 75 659 | | 11 |
