= Metallurgichesky constituency =

Legislative constituency in Russia

Metallurgichesky single-member constituency
- Constituency of the Russian State Duma
- Deputy: Aleksey Denisenko; United Russia
- Federal subject: Chelyabinsk Oblast
- Districts: Chelyabinsk (Metallurgichesky, Kurchatovsky), Kaslinsky, Krasnoarmeysky, Kunashaksky, Kyshtym, Nyazepetrovsky, ZATO Ozyorsk, ZATO Snezhinsk, Verkhny Ufaley
- Voters: 514,621 (2026)

The Metallurgichesky constituency (No.189 (Note: Kyshtym constituency No.184 in 1993–2007, No.190 in 2016–2026)) is a Russian legislative constituency in Chelyabinsk Oblast. The constituency covers northern Chelyabinsk as well as northern Chelyabinsk Oblast, including the towns Ozyorsk, Snezhinsk, Kyshtym and Verkhny Ufaley.

The constituency has been represented since 2026 by United Russia deputy Aleksey Denisenko, former Member of Legislative Assembly of Chelyabinsk Oblast and businessman, who won the open seat after defeating three-term United Russia incumbent Vladimir Burmatov in the primary.

== Boundaries ==
1993–2007 Kyshtym constituency: Asha, Ashinsky District, Kasli, Kaslinsky District, Katav-Ivanovsk, Katav-Ivanovsky District, Krasnoarmeysky District, Kunashaksky District, Kusinsky District, Kyshtym, Nyazepetrovsky District, Ozyorsk, Satka, Satkinsky District, Snezhinsk, Tryokhgorny, Ust-Katav, Verkhny Ufaley
The constituency covered all of northern and north-eastern Chelyabinsk Oblast as well as several districts of the Mountain-Industrial Zone in north-western part of the region, including the industrial towns Kyshtym, Ust-Katav, Verkhny Ufaley and nuclear research closed towns Ozyorsk, Snezhinsk, Tryokhgorny.

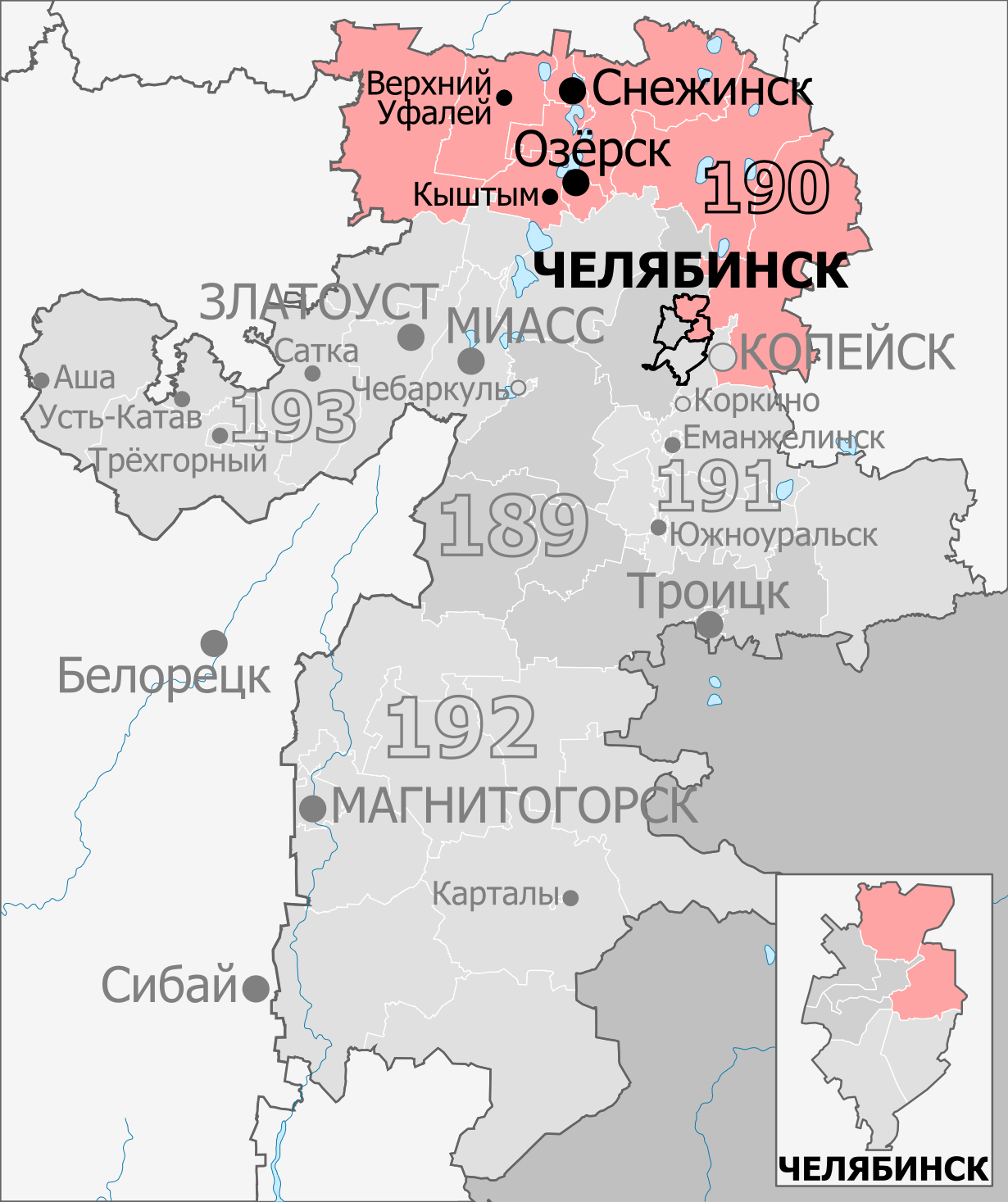
Constituency boundaries from 2016 to 2026

2016–2026: Chelyabinsk (Metallurgichesky, Traktorozavodsky), Kaslinsky District, Krasnoarmeysky District, Kunashaksky District, Kyshtym, Nyazepetrovsky District, Ozyorsk, Snezhinsk, Verkhny Ufaley
The constituency was re-created for the 2016 election under the name "Metallurgichesky constituency" and retained only northern and north-eastern Chelyabinsk Oblast, losing its portion of the Mountain-Industrial Zone to Zlatoust constituency. This seat was instead pushed to Chelyabinsk, gaining northern and eastern parts of the city from the former Kalininsky constituency.

2026–present: Chelyabinsk (Kurchatovsky, Metallurgichesky), Kaslinsky District, Krasnoarmeysky District, Kunashaksky District, Kyshtym, Nyazepetrovsky District, Ozyorsk, Snezhinsk, Verkhny Ufaley
After the 2025 redistricting the constituency was altered, swapping Traktorozavodsky City District of Chelyabinsk for Kurchatovsky City District with Chelyabinsk constituency.

== Members elected ==
Election	Member	Party
1993	Aleksandr Kushnar (Note: appointed Auditor of the Accounts Chamber of Russia in May 1995)	Choice of Russia
1995	Pyotr Sumin (Note: elected Governor of Chelyabinsk Oblast in December 1996)	Congress of Russian Communities
1997	Vladimir Gorbachyov	Independent
1999	Mikhail Grishankov	Independent
2003	Mikhail Grishankov	United Russia
2007	Proportional representation - no election by constituency	
2011	Proportional representation - no election by constituency	
2016	Vladimir Burmatov	United Russia
2021	Vladimir Burmatov	United Russia
2026	Aleksey Denisenko	United Russia

== Election results ==
=== 1993 ===
Summary of the 12 December 1993 Russian legislative election in the Kyshtym constituency
Candidate	Party	Votes	%
Aleksandr Kushnar	Choice of Russia	87,755	32.13%
Vladimir Gorbachyov	Independent	42,096	15.41%
Natalya Mironova	Yavlinsky–Boldyrev–Lukin	36,068	13.21%
Yevgeny Trofimov	Independent	23,457	8.59%
Gennady Gabitov	Independent	22,060	8.08%
Nikolay Lubenets	Party of Russian Unity and Accord	20,956	7.67%
against all		26,126	9.57%
Total		273,134	100%

=== 1995 ===
Summary of the 17 December 1995 Russian legislative election in the Kyshtym constituency
Candidate	Party	Votes	%
Pyotr Sumin	Congress of Russian Communities	121,916	37.26%
Vladimir Gorbachyov	Communist Party	40,160	12.27%
Talgat Khairov	Independent	31,225	9.54%
Viktor Tsittel	Yabloko	23,808	7.28%
Sergey Dyachkovsky	Independent	19,122	5.84%
Aleksandr Altynbayev	Independent	16,902	5.17%
Sergey Voloshin	Independent	14,969	4.57%
Lev Borisov	Democratic Choice of Russia – United Democrats	14,746	4.51%
Aleksandr Zhivoluk	Communists and Working Russia - for the Soviet Union	11,961	3.66%
against all		25,618	7.83%
Total		327,210	100%

=== 1997 June ===
After Pyotr Sumin was elected Governor of Chelyabinsk Oblast in December 1996 he had to give up his seat in the State Duma. A by-election was scheduled for 29 June 1997 with the concurrent by-election in the Sovetsky constituency. The by-election in Kyshtym constituency was won by Vasily Kichedzhi, however, the results were annulled due to low turnout (23.99%) and another election was scheduled for 14 December 1997.

Summary of the 29 June 1997 by-election in the Kyshtym constituency
Candidate	Party	Votes	
Vasily Kichedzhi	Independent	–	–
Yelena Emirsaliyeva	Independent	–	–
Boris Gulyayev	Independent	–	–
Anatoly Karpov	Independent	–	–
Sergey Kostromin	Independent	–	–
Aleksandr Sobakin	Independent	–	–
Vladimir Vachugov	Independent	–	–
against all		–	–
Total		–	100%

=== 1997 December ===
Summary of the 14 December 1997 by-election in the Kyshtym constituency
Candidate	Party	Votes	%
Vladimir Gorbachyov	Independent	65,174	39.17%
Vasily Kichedzhi	Independent	25,967	15.48%
Aleksandr Treshchyov	Independent	24,111	14.37%
Andrey Drobyshev	Independent	17,429	10.28%
Aleksandr Sobakin	Independent	7,857	4.68%
Gosman Kabirov	Independent	6,527	3.89%
Aleksandr Linev	Independent	3,079	1.84%
against all		13,264	7.91%
Total		167,783	100%
Eligible voters/turnout		508,935	32.97%

=== 1999 ===
Summary of the 19 December 1999 Russian legislative election in the Kyshtym constituency
Candidate	Party	Votes	%
Mikhail Grishankov	Independent	115,730	37.25%
Vladimir Gorbachyov (incumbent)	Independent	96,055	30.91%
Andrey Drobyshev	Independent	23,878	7.68%
Irina Zubakova	Union of Right Forces	13,297	4.28%
Aleksandr Chistyakov	Independent	11,083	3.57%
Andrey Belishko	Socialist Party	5,712	1.84%
Mikhail Voloshin	Independent	5,333	1.72%
Kim Sorokin	Andrey Nikolayev and Svyatoslav Fyodorov Bloc	4,232	1.36%
Vasily Yeliseyev	Independent	4,149	1.34%
Yury Safin	Independent	1,904	0.61%
against all		23,920	7.70%
Total		310,722	100%

=== 2003 ===
Summary of the 7 December 2003 Russian legislative election in the Kyshtym constituency
Candidate	Party	Votes	%
Mikhail Grishankov (incumbent)	United Russia	167,223	61.22%
Aleksandr Mitsukov	Russian Pensioners' Party-Party of Social Justice	47,793	17.50%
Aleksandr Zhivoluk	Russian Communist Workers Party–Russian Party of Communists	8,508	3.11%
Sergey Komkov	Agrarian Party	6,668	2.44%
Aleksandr Yemelin	Liberal Democratic Party	6,105	2.23%
Fatima Kobzhasarova	Yabloko	4,528	1.66%
Vasily Zvyagintsev	Independent	1,731	0.63%
against all		26,183	9.58%
Total		273,456	100%

=== 2016 ===
Summary of the 18 September 2016 Russian legislative election in the Metallurgichesky constituency
Candidate	Party	Votes	%
Vladimir Burmatov	United Russia	87,649	41.68%
Vasily Shvetsov	A Just Russia	41,426	19.70%
Vitaly Pashin	Liberal Democratic Party	21,284	10.12%
Konstantin Natsiyevsky	Communist Party	15,439	7.34%
Aleksey Sevastyanov	Yabloko	15,043	7.15%
Vladimir Gorbachyov	Communists of Russia	8,854	4.21%
Yelena Navrotskaya	Patriots of Russia	4,402	2.09%
Andrey Yatsun	Rodina	4,374	2.08%
Aleksey Tabalov	People's Freedom Party	2,632	1.25%
Total		210,286	100%

=== 2021 ===
Summary of the 17-19 September 2021 Russian legislative election in the Metallurgichesky constituency
Candidate	Party	Votes	%
Vladimir Burmatov (incumbent)	United Russia	111,860	50.80%
Igor Yegorov	Communist Party	29,182	13.25%
Dmitry Larin	A Just Russia — For Truth	28,129	12.78%
Anna Skroznikova	New People	14,677	6.67%
Yevgeny Baskanov	Liberal Democratic Party	9,123	4.14%
Maksim Smagin	Party of Pensioners	8,626	3.92%
Andrey Popov	Russian Party of Freedom and Justice	4,954	2.25%
Andrey Talevlin	Yabloko	2,856	1.30%
Aleksandr Tatarnikov	Rodina	2,475	1.12%
Total		220,185	100%

=== 2026 ===
Summary of the 18-20 September 2026 Russian legislative election in the Metallurgichesky constituency
Candidate	Party	Votes	%
Aleksey Denisenko	United Russia	110,875	39.86%
Yegor Babkin	A Just Russia	44,331	15.94%
Yevgeny Gorshkov	New People	35,720	12.84%
Tural Novruzov	Communist Party	29,371	10.56%
Anton Kudinov	Liberal Democratic Party	19,506	7.01%
Denis Borsuk	Party of Pensioners	18,332	6.59%
Anna Valiyeva	The Greens	11,549	4.15%
Total		278,184	100%
