= Sungul =

Lake in Chelyabinsk Oblast, Russia

Coordinates: 55°57′43″N 60°42′10″E

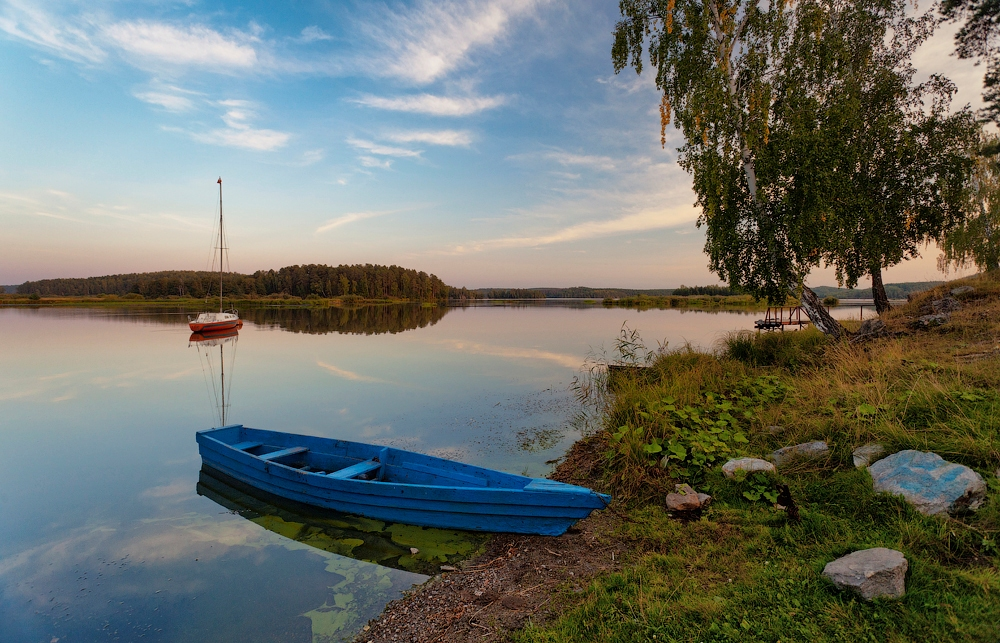
Sungul near Vishnyovogorsk

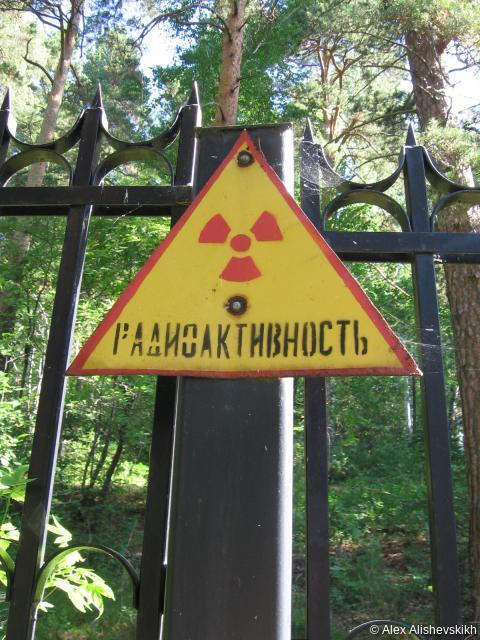
Abandoned Laboratory B site

Sungul (Russian: Сунгуль is a lake in the Kaslinsky District, Chelyabinsk Oblast, Russia.

It is known as a location of the Soviet nuclear research facility Laboratory B established in place of the Sungul sanatorium.
