= Satkinsky =

Satkinsky (masculine), Satkinskaya (feminine), or Satkinskoye (neuter) may refer to:

- Satkinsky District, a district of Chelyabinsk Oblast, Russia
- Satkinskoye Urban Settlement, a municipal formation which the town of Satka in Satkinsky District of Chelyabinsk Oblast, Russia is incorporated as
