= Nyazepetrovsky =

Nyazepetrovsky (masculine), Nyazepetrovskaya (feminine), or Nyazepetrovskoye (neuter) may refer to:

- Nyazepetrovsky District, a district of Chelyabinsk Oblast, Russia
- Nyazepetrovskoye Urban Settlement, a municipal formation which the Town of Nyazepetrovsk in Nyazepetrovsky District of Chelyabinsk Oblast, Russia is incorporated as
