= Staraya Pristan =

Staraya Pristan (Russian: Старая Пристань) is the name of several rural localities in Russia:

- Staraya Pristan, Chelyabinsk Oblast, a village in Aylinsky Selsoviet of Satkinsky District in Chelyabinsk Oblast
- Staraya Pristan, Republic of Tatarstan, a village in Laishevsky District of the Republic of Tatarstan
