= Kaslinsky =

Kaslinsky (masculine), Kaslinskaya (feminine), or Kaslinskoye (neuter) may refer to:

- Kaslinsky District, a district of Chelyabinsk Oblast, Russia
- Kaslinskoye Urban Settlement, a municipal formation which the town of Kasli in Kaslinsky District of Chelyabinsk Oblast, Russia is incorporated as
