= Yemanzhelinsky =

Yemanzhelinsky (masculine), Yemanzhelinskaya (feminine), or Yemanzhelinskoye (neuter) may refer to:

- Yemanzhelinsky District, a district of Chelyabinsk Oblast, Russia
- Yemanzhelinskoye Urban Settlement, a municipal formation which the Town of Yemanzhelinsk in Yemanzhelinsky District of Chelyabinsk Oblast, Russia is incorporated as
