= Vladimir Burmatov =

Russian politician (born 1981)

- Владимир Бурматов
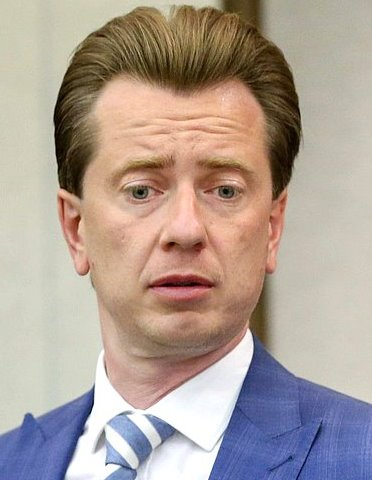
- Burmatov in 2018

Member of the State Duma for Chelyabinsk Oblast
- Incumbent
- Assumed office 5 October 2016
- Preceded by: constituency re-established
- Constituency: Metallurgichesky (No. 190)

Member of the State Duma (Party List Seat)
- In office 21 December 2011 – 5 October 2016

Personal details
- Born: 18 August 1981 (age 44) Zlatoust, Chelyabinsk Oblast, Russian SFSR, Soviet Union
- Party: United Russia
- Spouse: Olga Yurievna Burmatova
- Parent(s): 2 (1 son, 1 daughter)
- Occupation: Academic (resigned)

Vladimir Vladimirovich Burmatov (Russian: Владимир Владимирович Бурматов; born 18 August 1981, Zlatoust, Chelyabinsk Oblast) is a Russian political figure and a deputy of the 6th, 7th and 8th State Dumas.

== Biography ==
In 2003 Burmatov graduated from the Chelyabinsk State University. In three years, he was granted a Doctor of Science degree in Pedagogy. From 2006 to 2008, he was a chief specialist on youth engagement of the executive committee of the Chelyabinsk regional branch of the United Russia. In 2006 he became a prominent member of the regional branch of the Young Guard of United Russia. In 2010 he headed the department of political science and social communication at the Plekhanov Russian University of Economics. From 2011 to 2016, he was a deputy of the 6th State Duma where he represented the Chelyabinsk Oblast constituency.

In 2012 Dissernet accused Burmatov of plagiarism that they found in his doctoral presentation. The Moscow prosecutor's office made a case to the administration of the Plekhanov Russian University of Economics, stating that Burmatov did not comply with the requirements for the position of a department head. Burmatov rejected all accusations but still resigned from the position. Because of the scandal, Burmatov was also removed from the post of First Deputy Head of the Education Committee.

In 2016–2017, he combined the post of head of the Central Election Commission of the United Russia party with a position in the State Duma

Since September 2021, he has served as a deputy of the 8th State Duma. He represents the Chelyabinsk constituency. In October 2021, Burmatov was appointed First Vice Chairman of the State Duma Ecology Committee.

== Sanctions ==
He was sanctioned by the UK government in 2022 in relation to the Russo-Ukrainian War.
