= Magnitka =

Magnitka may refer to:

- Magnitka (urban-type settlement), an urban locality (a work settlement) in Chelyabinsk Oblast, Russia
- Magnitka, informal name of Magnitogorsk Iron and Steel Works, in Russia
- 2094 Magnitka, a main belt asteroid
