= Mezhevoy =

Mezhevoy Межевой
- Urban-type settlement
- Interactive map of Mezhevoy
- Location of Mezhevoy Mezhevoy (Chelyabinsk Oblast)
- Coordinates: 55.1703°N 58.7872°E
- Country: Russia
- Federal subject: Chelyabinsk Oblast
- Administrative district: Satkinsky District

Population (2010 Census)
  - Total: 5,649
  - Estimate (2025): 4,913 (−13%)
- Time zone: UTC+5 (MSK+2)
- Postal code: 456905
- OKTMO ID: 75649158051

Mezhevoy (Russian: Межевой) is an urban locality (an urban-type settlement) in Satkinsky District of Chelyabinsk Oblast, Russia. Population: 5,649 (2010 census); 5,578 (2002 census); 5,808 (1989 Soviet census).
