= Suleya =

Suleya Сулея
- Urban-type settlement
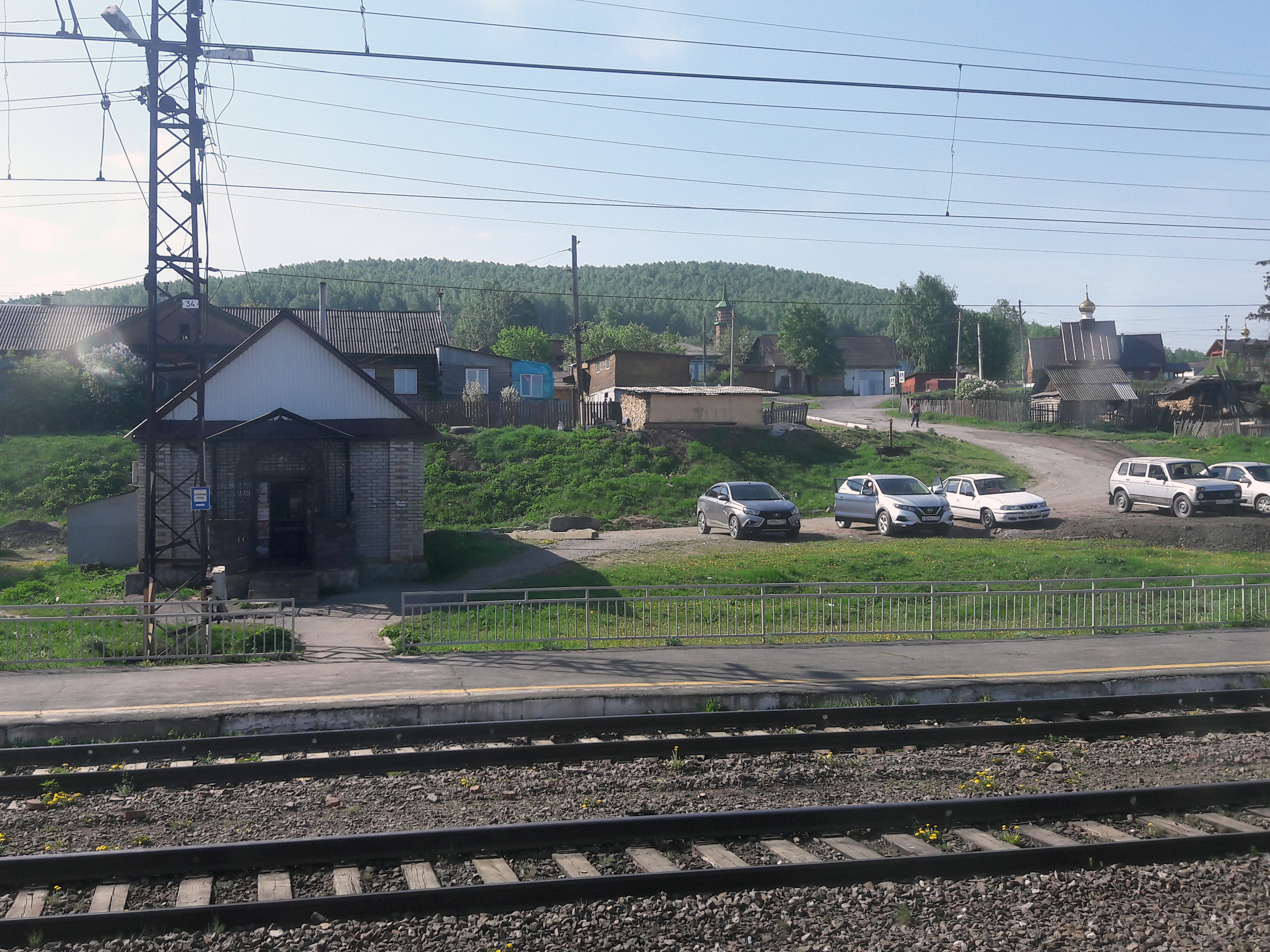
- View of Suleya as seen from train
- Interactive map of Suleya
- Location of Suleya Suleya (Chelyabinsk Oblast)
- Coordinates: 55.1355°N 58.8799°E
- Country: Russia
- Federal subject: Chelyabinsk Oblast
- Administrative district: Satkinsky District
- Founded: 1889
- Elevation: 381 m (1,250 ft)

Population (2010 Census)
  - Total: 3,183
  - Estimate (2025): 2,699 (−15.2%)
- Time zone: UTC+5 (MSK+2)
- Postal code: 456920
- OKTMO ID: 75649162051

Suleya (Russian: Сулея) is an urban locality (an urban-type settlement) in Satkinsky District of Chelyabinsk Oblast, Russia. Population: 3,183 (2010 census); 2,941 (2002 census); 3,095 (1989 Soviet census).
