= Pervomaysky, Korkinsky District, Chelyabinsk Oblast =

Pervomaysky Первомайский
- Urban-type settlement
- Interactive map of Pervomaysky
- Location of Pervomaysky Pervomaysky (Chelyabinsk Oblast)
- Coordinates: 54.8658°N 61.1722°E
- Country: Russia
- Federal subject: Chelyabinsk Oblast
- Administrative district: Korkinsky District
- Founded: 1949

Population (2010 Census)
  - Total: 10,645
  - Estimate (2025): 9,306 (−12.6%)
- Time zone: UTC+5 (MSK+2)
- Postal code: 456541
- OKTMO ID: 75633154051

Pervomaysky (Russian: Первомайский) is an urban locality (an urban-type settlement) in Korkinsky District of Chelyabinsk Oblast, Russia. Population: 10,645 (2010 census); 10,759 (2002 census); 10,101 (1989 Soviet census).
