= Lokomotivny =

Lokomotivny Локомотивный
- Work settlement
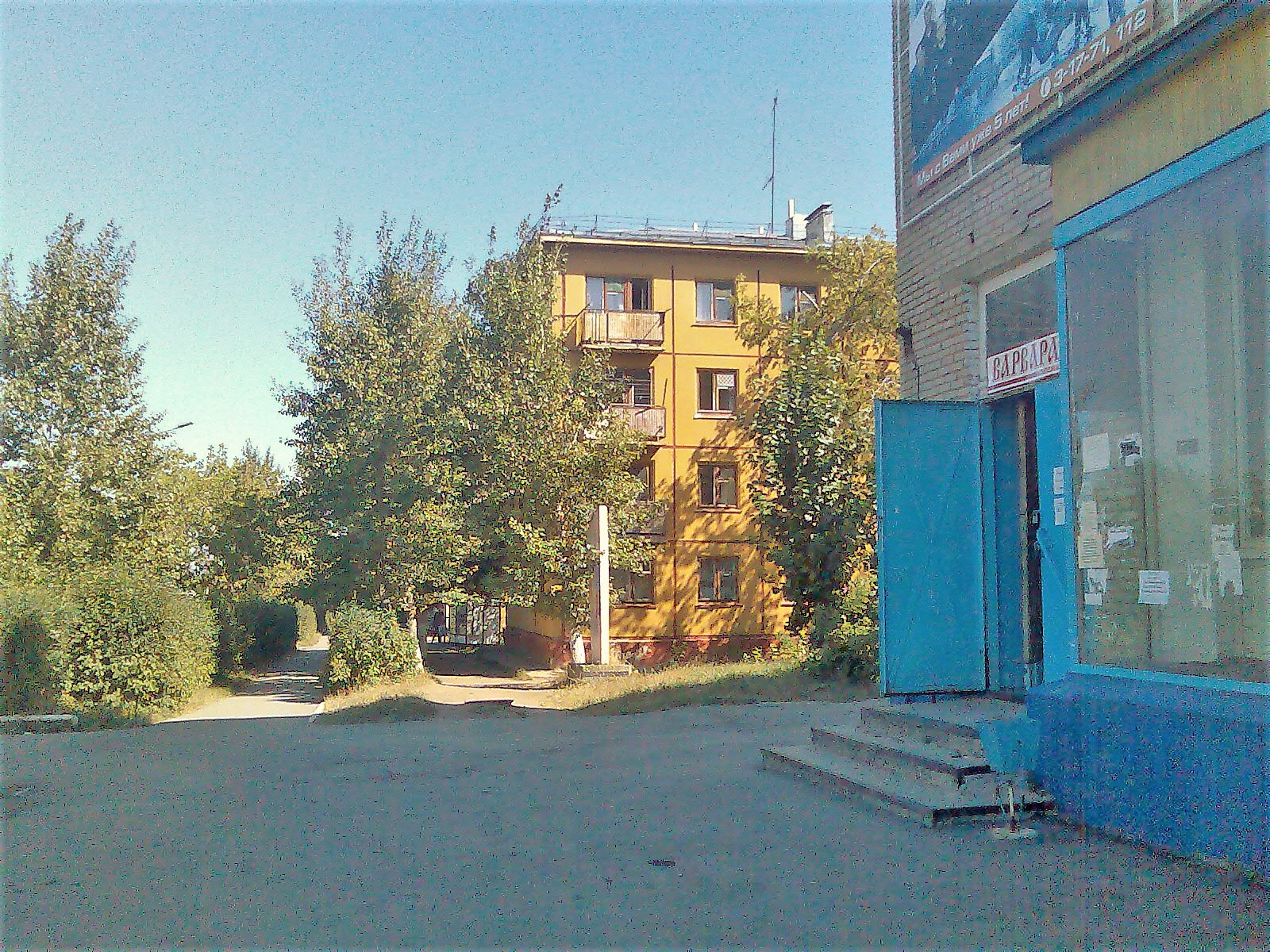
- In Lokomotivny

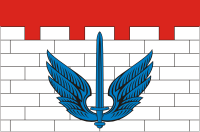
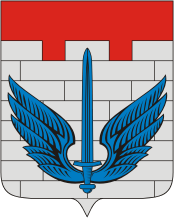
- Flag Coat of arms
- Interactive map of Lokomotivny
- Location of Lokomotivny Lokomotivny (Chelyabinsk Oblast)
- Coordinates: 53°02′34.1″N 60°36′50.1″E
- Country: Russia
- Federal subject: Chelyabinsk Oblast
- Founded: 1965

Population (2010 Census)
  - Total: 8,498
  - Estimate (2025): 8,593 (+1.1%)

Administrative status
  - Subordinated to: urban-type settlement of oblast significance of Lokomotivny
  - Capital of: urban-type settlement of oblast significance of Lokomotivny

Municipal status
  - Urban okrug: Lokomotivny Urban Okrug
  - Capital of: Lokomotivny Urban Okrug
- Time zone: UTC+5 (MSK+2)
- Postal code: 457390
- OKTMO ID: 75759000051

Lokomotivny (Russian: Локомоти́вный) is a closed urban locality (a work settlement) in Chelyabinsk Oblast, Russia, located 264 kilometers (164 mi) southwest from Chelyabinsk. Population: 8,498 (2010 census); 10,741 (2002 census).

== Administrative and municipal status ==
Within the framework of administrative divisions, it is incorporated as the urban-type settlement of oblast significance of Lokomotivny—an administrative unit with the status equal to that of the districts. As a municipal division, the urban-type settlement of oblast significance of Lokomotivny is incorporated as Lokomotivny Urban Okrug.
