= Roza, Chelyabinsk Oblast =

Roza Роза
- Urban-type settlement
- Interactive map of Roza
- Location of Roza Roza (Chelyabinsk Oblast)
- Coordinates: 54°54′30″N 61°27′00″E
- Country: Russia
- Federal subject: Chelyabinsk Oblast
- Administrative district: Korkinsky District
- Founded: 1931

Population (2010 Census)
  - Total: 13,099
  - Estimate (2025): 8,477 (−35.3%)
- Time zone: UTC+5 (MSK+2)
- Postal code: 456543
- OKTMO ID: 75633156051

Roza (Russian: Ро́за) is an urban locality (a work settlement) in Korkinsky District of Chelyabinsk Oblast, Russia. Population: 13,099 (2010 census); 14,597 (2002 census); 15,588 (1989 Soviet census).

== History ==
It was founded on October 1, 1981. The official holiday of Roza is observed on the last Sunday of August.
