= Zauralsky =

Zauralsky Зауральский
- Urban-type settlement
- Interactive map of Zauralsky
- Location of Zauralsky Zauralsky (Chelyabinsk Oblast)
- Coordinates: 54.7876°N 61.2371°E
- Country: Russia
- Federal subject: Chelyabinsk Oblast
- Administrative district: Yemanzhelinsky District

Population (2010 Census)
  - Total: 7,884
  - Estimate (2025): 6,791 (−13.9%)
- Time zone: UTC+5 (MSK+2)
- Postal code: 456591
- OKTMO ID: 75619152051

Zauralsky (Russian: Зауральский) is an urban locality (an urban-type settlement) in Yemanzhelinsky District of Chelyabinsk Oblast, Russia. Population: 7,884 (2010 census); 7,834 (2002 census); 7,926 (1989 Soviet census).
