= Krasnogorsky, Chelyabinsk Oblast =

Krasnogorsky Красногорский
- Urban-type settlement
- Interactive map of Krasnogorsky
- Location of Krasnogorsky Krasnogorsky (Chelyabinsk Oblast)
- Coordinates: 54.6033°N 61.2358°E
- Country: Russia
- Federal subject: Chelyabinsk Oblast
- Administrative district: Yemanzhelinsky District
- Founded: 1946

Population (2010 Census)
  - Total: 13,624
  - Estimate (2025): 11,900 (−12.7%)
- Time zone: UTC+5 (MSK+2)
- Postal code: 456592
- OKTMO ID: 75619154051

Krasnogorsky (Russian: Красногорский) is an urban locality (an urban-type settlement) in Yemanzhelinsky District of Chelyabinsk Oblast, Russia. Population: 13,624 (2010 census); 13,702 (2002 census); 15,393 (1989 Soviet census).
