= Berdyaush =

Berdyaush Бердяуш
- Urban-type settlement
- Interactive map of Berdyaush
- Location of Berdyaush Berdyaush (Chelyabinsk Oblast)
- Coordinates: 55.1666°N 59.1528°E
- Country: Russia
- Federal subject: Chelyabinsk Oblast
- Administrative district: Satkinsky District
- Founded: 1890
- Elevation: 425 m (1,394 ft)

Population (2010 Census)
  - Total: 5,304
  - Estimate (2025): 3,746 (−29.4%)
- Time zone: UTC+5 (MSK+2)
- Postal code: 456935
- OKTMO ID: 75649153051

Berdyaush (Russian: Бердяуш) is an urban locality (an urban-type settlement) in Satkinsky District of Chelyabinsk Oblast, Russia. Population: 5,304 (2010 census); 5,672 (2002 census); 6,530 (1989 Soviet census).
