= Chelyabinsk Oblast =

First-level administrative division of Russia

Chelyabinsk Oblast Челябинская область (Russian)
- Oblast
- Flag Coat of arms

- Coordinates: 55.16°N 61.40°E
- Country: Russia
- Federal district: Ural
- Economic region: Ural
- Established: January 17, 1934
- Administrative center: Chelyabinsk

Government
  - Body: Legislative Assembly
  - Governor: Aleksey Teksler

Area
  - Total: 88,529 km^{2} (34,181 sq mi)
  - Rank: 36th

Population (2021 census)
  - Total: 3,431,224 ▼
  - Estimate (2018): 3,493,036
  - Rank: 9th
  - Density: 38.758/km^{2} (100.38/sq mi)
  - Urban: 82.6%
  - Rural: 17.4%

GDP (nominal, 2024)
  - Total: ₽2.59 trillion (US$30.38 billion)
  - Per capita: ₽761,166 (US$8,931.67)
- Time zone: UTC+5 (MSK+2)
- ISO 3166 code: RU-CHE
- License plates: 74, 174, 774
- OKTMO ID: 75000000
- Official languages: Russian
- Website: www.pravmin74.ru

Chelyabinsk Oblast (Note: Russian: Челябинская область, romanized: Chelyabinskaya oblast', IPA: [tɕɪˈlʲæbʲɪnskəjə ˈobɫəstʲ]; Bashkir: Силәбе өлкәһе, romanized: Siləbe ölkəhe, IPA: [sʲilæˈβɘ ʉlkæˈhɪ̞]) is a federal subject (an oblast) of Russia in the Ural Mountains region, on the border of Europe and Asia. Its administrative center is the city of Chelyabinsk.

== History ==
During the Middle Ages, Bashkir tribes inhabited the Southern Urals; they formed part of the Golden Horde, Nogai Horde, and smaller Bashkir unions. The Tsardom of Russia incorporated the area in the late 16th century. However, Russian colonization of the region only began in the 18th century, with the establishment of a system of fortresses and trade posts on the then-Russian border by the Orenburg Expedition in 1734. Many cities of Chelyabinsk Oblast, including the city of Chelyabinsk itself, trace their history back to those forts.

In 1743 the Chelyabinsk fortress became a center of the Iset Province, a constituent part of the Orenburg Governorate (a direct successor of the Orenburg Expedition). The period from the 1750s to the 1770s saw the emergence of industrial enterprises in the Southern Urals when the first factory-centered towns like Miass, Kyshtym, and Zlatoust were founded. After the Southern Urals recovered from the Pugachev's Rebellion of 1773–1775, the territory of modern-day Chelyabinsk Oblast started to attract more people from the European part of Russia. By the mid-19th century Chelyabinsk was a major trade center in the Urals, and after the construction of the Trans-Siberian Railway in the 1890s, it became an important transport hub that connected Siberia to the rest of the Russian Empire.

In 1919, Chelyabinsk became the regional capital of the newly formed Chelyabinsk Governorate of the Russian SFSR, which combined eastern portions of the Orenburg Governorate with Kurgan of the Tobolsk Governorate. At this time, the population of the new region has already exceeded one million people. In 1923, together with the Perm, Yekaterinburg Governorate and Tyumen governorates, it merged into a single Ural Oblast that lasted only ten years, until 1934. On 17 January 1934, Chelyabinsk Oblast was finally established. Its current boundaries were formed when Kurgan Oblast was detached from it in 1943.

=== Soviet industrialization ===
During the 1930s the regional economy and industrial output grew as Chelyabinsk Oblast became a key focus of the First Five-Year Plan. Key factories and enterprises that formed the core of the modern Chelyabinsk economy, including the Magnitogorsk Iron and Steel Works, the Chelyabinsk Tractor Plant and the Chelyabinsk Metallurgical Plant, originated at this time. The economy continued to grow after the outbreak of the Great Patriotic War in 1941, as industries evacuated from the western parts of the Soviet Union to the Urals, and to Chelyabinsk Oblast in particular. During the war, Magnitogorsk alone produced one third of all Soviet steel, while the city of Chelyabinsk became the main center of Soviet tank production, earning the nickname "Tankograd" (Tank City).

=== Nuclear research ===
Chelyabinsk Oblast has been home to top-secret nuclear research since the 1940s. While there are no nuclear power stations in Chelyabinsk, a number of production reactors were located there starting with the early Cold War. A serious nuclear accident occurred in 1957 at the Mayak nuclear fuel reprocessing plant, 150 km (93 mi) north-west of the city, which led to evacuations and fatalities throughout the oblast, although not in Chelyabinsk city. The province was closed to all foreigners until 1992, with the sole exception of allowing a British medical team in following a two-train rail explosion in the mid-1980s.

Sławomir Grünberg has made the documentary Chelyabinsk: The Most Contaminated Spot on the Planet (1994) about the unsafe dumping of radioactive waste in the Techa River and in Lake Karachay.

=== Recent history ===
On 4 July 1997, Chelyabinsk, alongside Bryansk, Magadan, Saratov, and Vologda signed a power-sharing agreement with the government of Russia, granting it autonomy. The agreement would be abolished on 2 February 2002.

On 15 February 2013, a 10,000 ton meteoroid entered the Earth's atmosphere over Russia at about 09:20 YEKT (03:20 UTC). It passed over the southern Ural region and exploded in a meteor air burst over Chelyabinsk Oblast. About 1,500 people were reported injured, including 311 children. Health officials said 112 people had been hospitalized, mainly from injuries caused by glass from windows shattered by a shock wave; two were reported to be in serious condition. As many as 3,000 buildings in six cities across the region were damaged by the explosion and impacts. The meteor created a dazzling light as it air burst, bright enough to cast shadows during broad daylight in Chelyabinsk.

== Geography ==
Chelyabinsk Oblast is at the eastern end of the slope just under the Southern Urals, and the other part of the territory to the west is on the western slopes of the Southern Urals.

Chelyabinsk Oblast is situated in the Southern Urals, near Kurgan and Sverdlovsk oblast. Most of the Oblast is located at the eastern end of the Ural Mountains, which form the continental boundary between Europe and Asia. This boundary is marked by a stone pillar. In the Sverdlovsk Oblast, north of Chelyabinsk, there is a famous pillar separating the two continents, which has "Europe" written on one side and "Asia" on the other. In Chelyabinsk Oblast, Zlatoust city, Katav-Ivanovsk, Satka, Chelyabinsk, Troitsk, and Miass are in Europe. Magnitogorsk is located on both continents.

The area of Chelyabinsk Oblast is 88,900 km^{2} (34,300 sq mi). The total length of its external border is 2,750 km (1,710 mi), and the Oblast measures 400 km (250 mi) from north to south and 490 km (300 mi) from west to east.

The highest point of Chelyabinsk Oblast, reaching 1,406 metres (4,613 ft) above sea level, is located in the Nurgush, a 50 kilometres (31 mi) long mountain range rising near lake Zyuratkul.

It also borders the country of Kazakhstan, specifically the Kostanay Region.

=== Relief ===
Chelyabinsk Oblast has a very diverse landscape, ranging from lowlands and hilly plains to mountain ranges with peaks exceeding 1,000 m, including Nurgush mountain (1406 m). The mountainous area has several ski resorts.

The West Siberian Plain is bounded on the west horizontal (elevation 190 m above sea level), which passes through the village of Bagaryak, Kunashak and continues through Chelyabinsk to the south. The lowlands are located in the northeast, and the elevation drops to 130 m in the eastern border region.

=== Hydrology ===
Numerous rivers originate within the region, within the basins of the Kama, Tobol, and Ural rivers. The region is home to 348 rivers longer than 10 km (6.2 mi) (totaling 10,235 km (6,360 mi) in length), 17 of which are over 100 km (62 mi) in length. Seven rivers, the Miass, Uy, Ural, Ay, Ufa, Uvelka, and Gumbeyka, pass through the area and are longer than 200 km (124 mi).

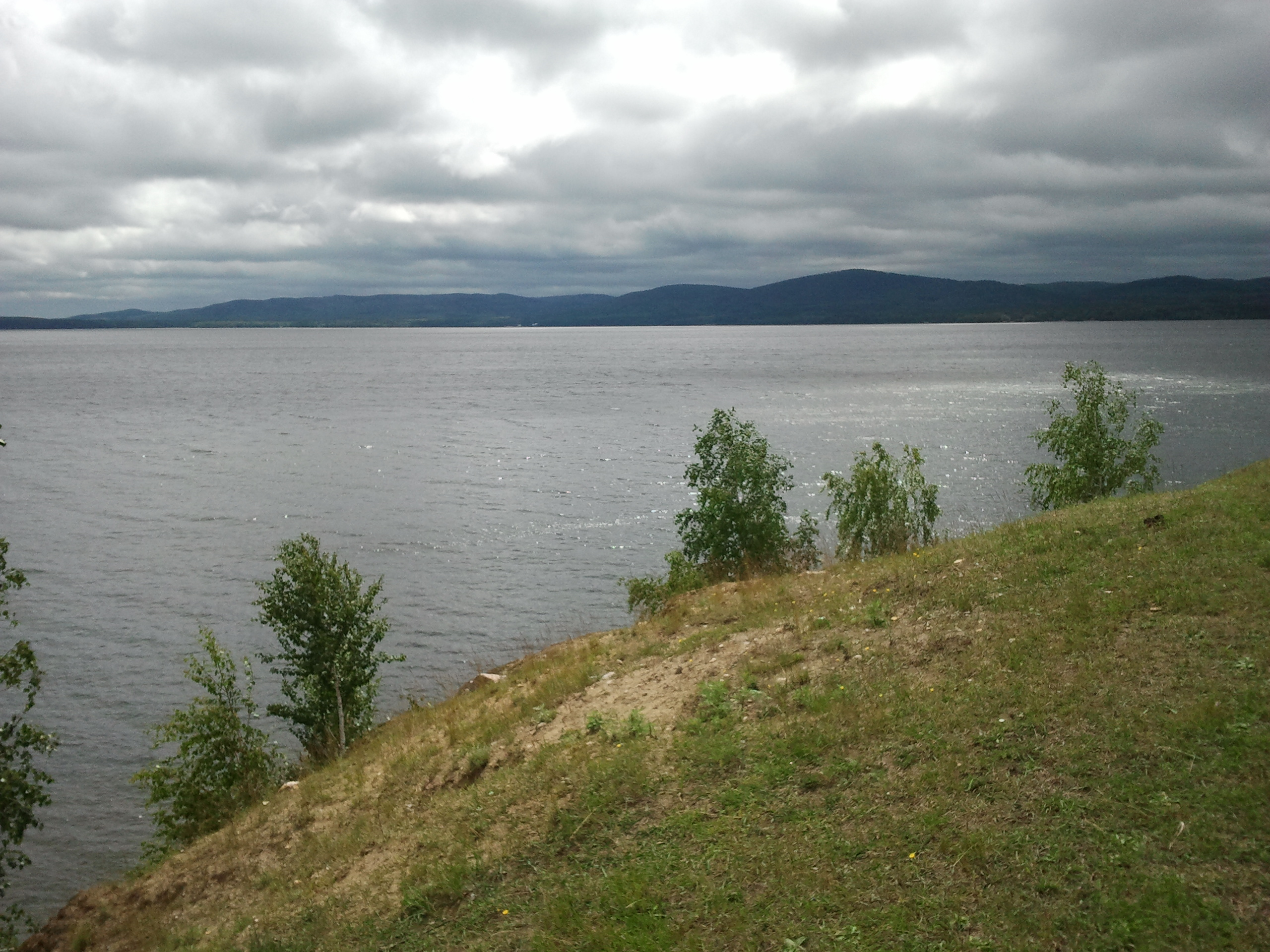
Lake Itkul

Chelyabinsk Oblast is also home to more than 3,748 lakes, mostly located in the north and east and covering a total area of 2,125 km^{2} (820 sq mi). Many of the lakes in this area, including Lake Turgoyak, Zyuratkul, and Lake Itkul, are famous for their clear waters and attract tourism. Some of the lakes in the eastern foothills have tectonic origins as water accumulated in tectonic failures (basins), resulting in very deep lakes that can reach 30–40 m (98–131 ft).

=== Administrative divisions ===
As of 2015:
Number of districts (районы)	27
Number of cities/towns (города)	30
Number of urban-type settlements (посёлки городского типа)	13
Number of selsovets (сельсоветы)	242
As of 2002:
Number of rural localities (сельские населённые пункты)	1,260
Number of uninhabited rural localities (сельские населённые пункты без населения)	24

Map of Chelyabinsk Oblast (with numbered and numerical number)

Administrative and municipal divisions

Map

Division		Structure		OKATO	OKTMO	Urban-type settlement/ district-level town*	Rural (selsovet)
Division		Administrative	Municipal	OKATO	OKTMO	Urban-type settlement/ district-level town*	Rural (selsovet)
Tryokhgorny (Трёхгорный)		city (ZATO)	urban okrug	75 507	75 707		
Ozyorsk (Озёрск)		city (ZATO)	urban okrug	75 543	75 743		
Snezhinsk (Снежинск)		city (ZATO)	urban okrug	75 545	75 746		
Lokomotivny (Локомотивный)		urban-type settlement (ZATO)	urban okrug	75 558	75 759		
Chelyabinsk (Челябинск)		city	urban okrug	75 401	75 701		
↳	Kalininsky (Калининский)	(under Chelyabinsk)	—N/a	75 401	—N/a		
↳	Kurchatovsky (Курчатовский)	(under Chelyabinsk)	—N/a	75 401	—N/a		
↳	Leninsky (Ленинский)	(under Chelyabinsk)	—N/a	75 401	—N/a		
↳	Metallurgichesky (Металлургический)	(under Chelyabinsk)	—N/a	75 401	—N/a		
↳	Sovetsky (Советский)	(under Chelyabinsk)	—N/a	75 401	—N/a		
↳	Traktorozavodsky (Тракторозаводский)	(under Chelyabinsk)	—N/a	75 401	—N/a		
↳	Tsentralny (Центральный)	(under Chelyabinsk)	—N/a	75 401	—N/a		
Asha (Аша)		city	(under Kunashaksky)	75 403	75 636		
Verkhny Ufaley (Верхний Уфалей)		city	urban okrug	75 406	75 706		
Yemanzhelinsk (Еманжелинск)		city	(under Yemanzhelinsky)	75 409	75 619		
Zlatoust (Златоуст)		city	urban okrug	75 412	75 712		
Karabash (Карабаш)		city	urban okrug	75 415	75 715		
Kartaly (Карталы)		city	(under Kartalinsky)	75 418	75 623		
Kasli (Касли)		city	(under Kaslinsky)	75 421	75 626		
Katav-Ivanovsk (Катав-Ивановск)		city	(under Katav-Ivanovsky)	75 424	75 629		
Kopeysk (Копейск)		city	urban okrug	75 428	75 728		
Korkino (Коркино)		city	(under Korkinsky)	75 431	75 633		
Kyshtym (Кыштым)		city	urban okrug	75 434	75 734		
Magnitogorsk (Магнитогорск)		city	urban okrug	75 438	75 738		
↳	Leninsky (Ленинский)	(under Magnitogorsk)	—N/a	75 438	—N/a		
↳	Ordzhonikidzevsky (Орджоникидзевский)	(under Magnitogorsk)	—N/a	75 438	—N/a		
↳	Pravoberezhny (Правобережный)	(under Magnitogorsk)	—N/a	75 438	—N/a		
Miass (Миасс)		city	urban okrug	75 442	75 742		
Plast (Пласт)		city	(under Plastovsky)	75 445	75 648		
Satka (Сатка)		city	(under Satkinsky)	75 448	75 649		
Troitsk (Троицк)		city	urban okrug	75 452	75 752		
Ust-Katav (Усть-Катав)		city	urban okrug	75 455	75 755		
Chebarkul (Чебаркуль)		city	urban okrug	75 458	75 758		
Yuzhnouralsk (Южноуральск)		city	urban okrug	75 464	75 764		
Agapovsky (Агаповский)		district		75 203	75 603		10
Argayashsky (Аргаяшский)		district		75 206	75 606		12
Ashinsky (Ашинский)		district		75 209	75 609	Minyar (Миньяр) town*; Sim (Сим) town*; Kropachyovo (Кропачёво)	5
Bredinsky (Брединский)		district		75 212	75 612		11
Varnensky (Варненский)		district		75 214	75 614		13
Verkhneuralsky (Верхнеуральский)		district		75 217	75 617	Verkhneuralsk (Верхнеуральск) town*; Mezhozyorny (Межозёрный)	8
Yemanzhelinsky (Еманжелинский)		district		75 219	75 619	Krasnogorsky (Красногорский); Zauralsky (Зауральский)	
Yetkulsky (Еткульский)		district		75 220	75 620		12
Kartalinsky (Карталинский)		district		75 223	75 623		10
Kaslinsky (Каслинский)		district		75 226	75 626	Vishnyovogorsk (Вишнёвогорск)	9
Katav-Ivanovsky (Катав-Ивановский)		district		75 229	75 629	Yuryuzan (Юрюзань) town*	7
Kizilsky (Кизильский)		district		75 232	75 632		14
Korkinsky (Коркинский)		district		75 233	75 633	Pervomaysky (Первомайский); Roza (Роза)	
Krasnoarmeysky (Красноармейский)		district		75 234	75 634		15
Kunashaksky (Кунашакский)		district		75 236	75 636		9
Kusinsky (Кусинский)		district		75 238	75 638	Kusa (Куса) town*; Magnitka (Магнитка)	3
Nagaybaksky (Нагайбакский)		district		75 242	75 642	Yuzhny (Южный)	9
Nyazepetrovsky (Нязепетровский)		district		75 244	75 644	Nyazepetrovsk (Нязепетровск) town*	4
Oktyabrsky (Октябрьский)		district		75 247	75 647		13
Plastovsky (Пластовский)		district		75 248	75 648		4
Satkinsky (Саткинский)		district		75 249	75 649	Bakal (Бакал) town*; Berdyaush (Бердяуш); Mezhevoy (Межевой); Suleya (Сулея)	3
Sosnovsky (Сосновский)		district		75 252	75 652		16
Troitsky (Троицкий)		district		75 254	75 654		25
Uvelsky (Увельский)		district		75 255	75 655		10
Uysky (Уйский)		district		75 256	75 656		11
Chebarkulsky (Чебаркульский)		district		75 257	75 657		9
Chesmensky (Чесменский)		district		75 259	75 659		11

== Politics ==
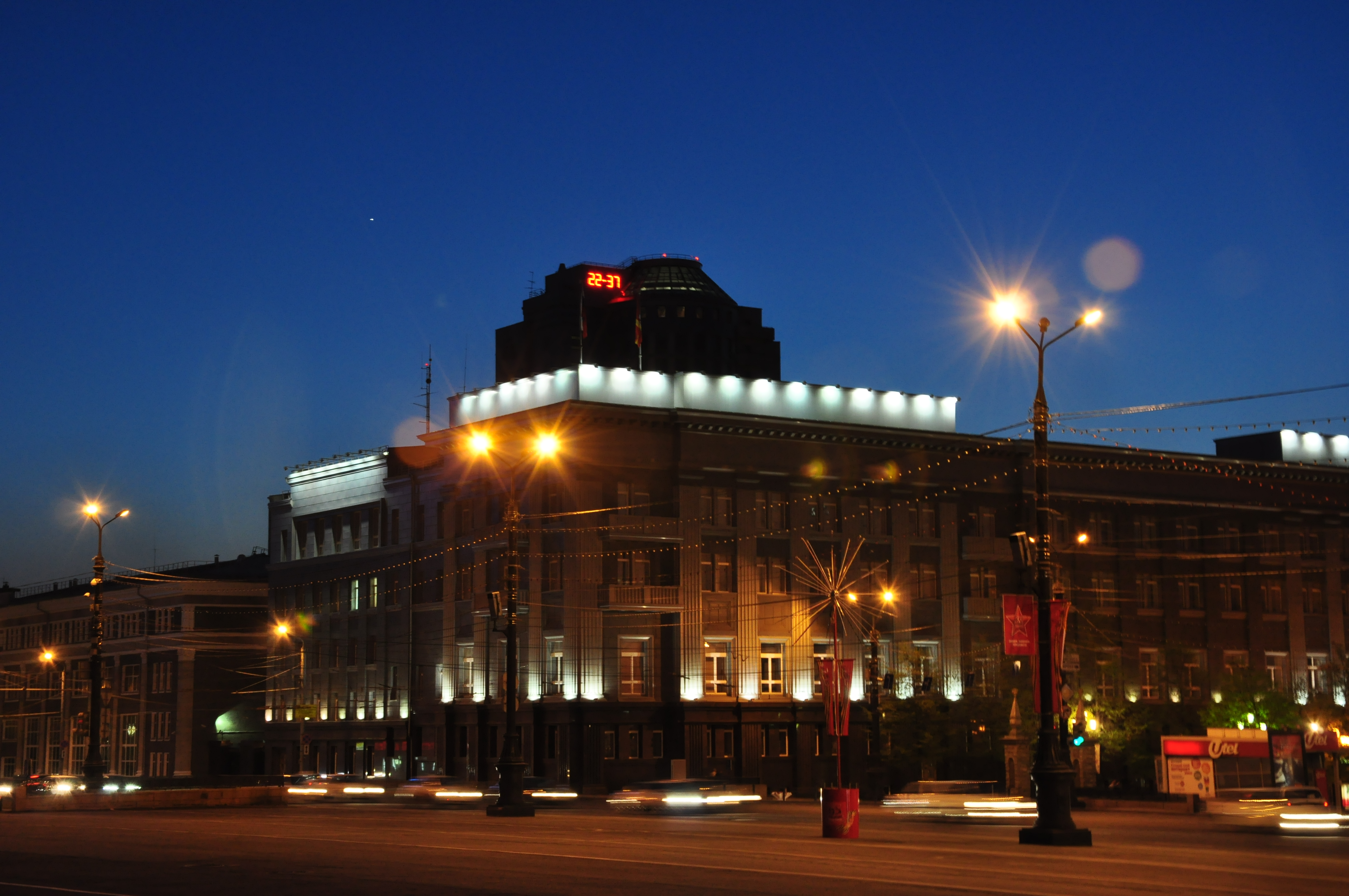
Seat of the Oblast government in Chelyabinsk

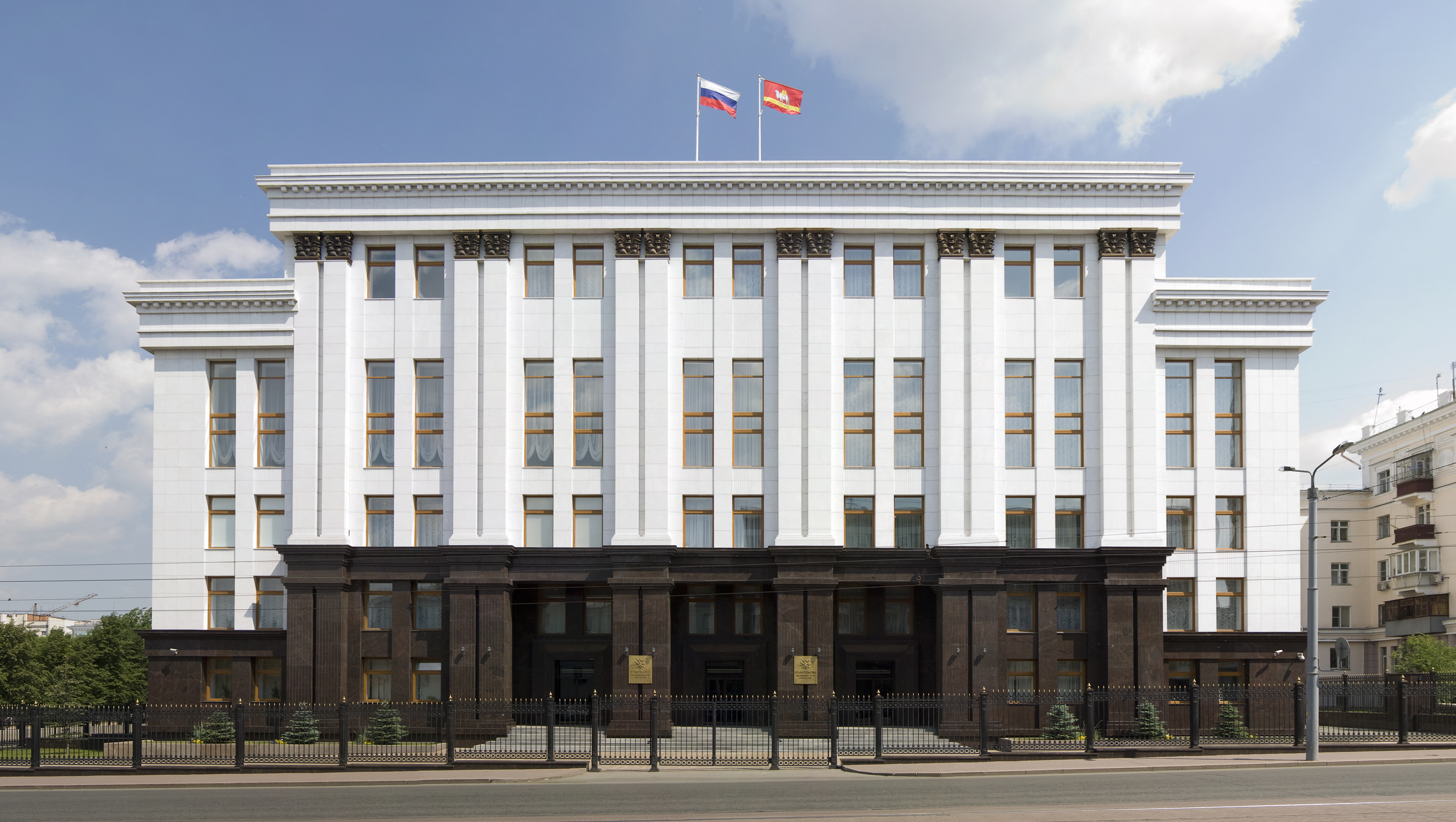
Governor's residence

During the Soviet period, the highest authority in the Oblast was shared between three positions: the First Secretary of the Chelyabinsk CPSU Committee (who held the most power), the Chairman of the Oblast Soviet (legislative power), and the Chairman of the Oblast Executive Committee (executive power). Since the dissolution of the Soviet Union in 1991, the CPSU lost its monopoly on power.

Today, the Charter of Chelyabinsk Oblast governs the political structure of the region. The Legislative Assembly of Chelyabinsk Oblast serves as the province's regional parliament and exercises legislative authority, with the power to pass laws, resolutions, and other legal acts and oversee their implementation and observance. The Oblast Government, led by the Governor of Chelyabinsk Oblast, is the highest executive body in the region, and includes territorial executive bodies such as district administrations, committees, and commissions that facilitate development and run the day-to-day matters of the province.

== Demographics ==
Historical population
Year	Pop.	±%
1926	2,564,012	—
1939	1,729,000	−32.6%
1959	2,976,625	+72.2%
1970	3,288,801	+10.5%
1979	3,438,866	+4.6%
1989	3,623,732	+5.4%
2002	3,603,339	−0.6%
2010	3,476,217	−3.5%
2021	3,431,224	−1.3%
2025	3,383,188	−1.4%
Source: Census data, estimate

Population: 3,431,224 (2021 census); 3,476,217 (2010 census); 3,603,339 (2002 census); 3,623,732 (1989 Soviet census).

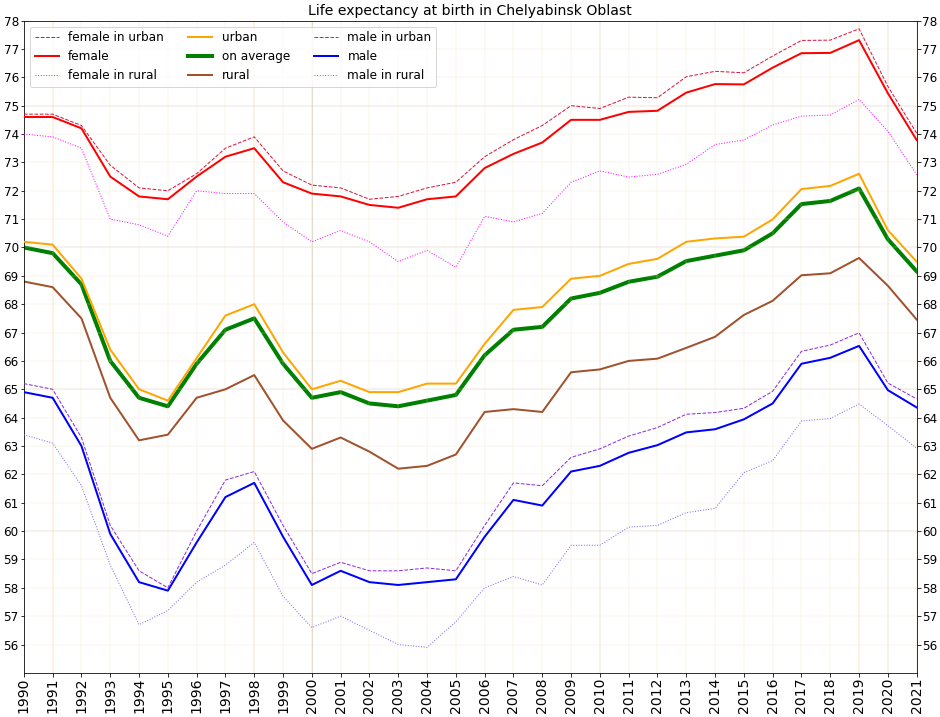
Life expectancy at birth in Chelyabinsk Oblast

Vital statistics for 2024:

- Births: 28,923 (8.5 per 1,000)
- Deaths: 46,048 (13.6 per 1,000)

Total fertility rate (2024):
1.45 children per woman

Life expectancy (2021):
Total: 69.16 years (male: 64.36, female: 73.79)

Ethnicities in Chelyabinsk Oblast in 2021
Ethnicity	Population	Percentage
Russians	2,526,414	86.3%
Bashkirs	128,071	4.4%
Tatars	120,242	4.1%
Kazakhs	29,057	1.0%
Ukrainians	17,154	0.6%
Tajiks	12,308	0.4%
Other Ethnicities	92,778	3.2%
Ethnicity not stated	505,200	–

Vital statistics for 2008

District (2008)	Type	Births	Deaths	NG	BR	DR	NGR
Chelyabinsk Oblast	Obl	44931	52625	-7694	12.8	15.0	-0.22%
Urban Areas	Obl	34550	41787	-7237	12.1	14.6	-0.25%
Rural Areas	Obl	10381	10838	-457	15.9	16.6	-0.07%
Chelyabinsk	Urb	12540	14192	-1652	11.5	13.0	-0.15%
Verkhny Ufaley	Urb	516	727	-211	13.6	19.1	-0.55%
Zlatoust	Urb	2111	2658	-547	11.1	13.9	-0.28%
Karabash	Urb	227	262	-35	14.5	16.7	-0.22%
Kopeysk	Urb	1737	2476	-739	12.5	17.8	-0.53%
Kyshtym	Urb	535	695	-160	12.5	16.2	-0.37%
Lokomotivny	Urb	117	41	76	11.8	4.1	0.77%
Magnitogorsk	Urb	5276	6112	-836	12.9	14.9	-0.20%
Miass	Urb	2289	2559	-270	13.7	15.3	-0.16%
Ozyorsk	Urb	912	1312	-400	9.2	13.2	-0.40%
Snezhinsk	Urb	544	586	-42	10.8	11.6	-0.08%
Tryokhgorny	Urb	402	338	64	11.7	9.8	0.19%
Troitsk	Urb	1085	1269	-184	13.2	15.4	-0.22%
Ust-Katav	Urb	318	515	-197	11.3	18.2	-0.69%
Chebarkul	Urb	550	698	-148	12.7	16.2	-0.35%
Yuzhnouralsk	Urb	428	602	-174	11.1	15.6	-0.45%
Agapovsky	Rur	649	513	136	18.5	14.6	0.39%
Argayashsky	Rur	831	671	160	19.7	15.9	0.38%
Ashinsky	Rur	831	1286	-455	12.6	19.5	-0.69%
Bredinsky	Rur	485	480	5	15.6	15.4	0.02%
Varnensky	Rur	460	453	7	15.9	15.7	0.02%
Verkhneuralsky	Rur	575	743	-168	13.6	17.6	-0.40%
Yemanzhelinsky	Rur	648	923	-275	12.2	17.3	-0.51%
Yetkulsky	Rur	443	466	-23	14.7	15.5	-0.08%
Kartalinsky	Rur	702	809	-107	14.1	16.2	-0.21%
Kaslinsky	Rur	461	758	-297	12.0	19.7	-0.77%
Katav-Ivanovsky	Rur	448	709	-261	12.8	20.2	-0.74%
Kizilsky	Rur	432	400	32	16.2	15.0	0.12%
Korkinsky	Rur	900	1256	-356	13.8	19.3	-0.55%
Krasnoarmeysky	Rur	638	754	-116	14.6	17.3	-0.27%
Kunashaksky	Rur	521	549	-28	17.6	18.6	-0.10%
Kusinsk	Rur	420	535	-115	13.9	17.7	-0.38%
Nagaybaksky	Rur	334	392	-58	15.0	17.7	-0.27%
Nyazepetrovsky	Rur	298	433	-135	14.6	21.3	-0.67%
Oktyabrsky	Rur	419	398	21	15.6	14.8	0.08%
Plastovsky	Rur	450	453	-3	17.2	17.3	-0.01%
Satkinsky	Rur	1230	1398	-168	14.2	16.1	-0.19%
Sosnovsky	Rur	942	933	9	16.0	15.8	0.02%
Troitsky	Rur	529	506	23	17.1	16.3	0.08%
Uvelsky	Rur	508	533	-25	16.1	16.9	-0.08%
Uysky	Rur	385	387	-2	14.6	14.7	-0.01%
Chebarkulsky	Rur	494	538	-44	16.6	18.1	-0.15%
Chesmensky	Rur	311	307	4	15.5	15.3	0.02%

=== Settlements ===
Largest cities or towns in Chelyabinsk Oblast 2010 Russian Census
Rank		Administrative Division	Pop.
1	Chelyabinsk	City of oblast significance of Chelyabinsk	1,130,132
2	Magnitogorsk	City of oblast significance of Magnitogorsk	407,775
3	Zlatoust	City of oblast significance of Zlatoust	174,962
4	Miass	City of oblast significance of Miass	151,751
5	Kopeysk	City of oblast significance of Kopeysk	137,601
6	Ozyorsk	Closed administrative-territorial formation of Ozyorsk	82,164
7	Troitsk	Town of oblast significance of Troitsk	78,372
8	Snezhinsk	Closed administrative-territorial formation of Snezhinsk	48,810
9	Satka	Town of oblast significance of Satka	45,178
10	Chebarkul	Town of oblast significance of Chebarkul	42,844

Chelyabinsk Oblast is highly urbanized.

=== Religion ===
Religion in Chelyabinsk Oblast as of 2012 (Sreda Arena Atlas)
Russian Orthodoxy	30.9%
Other Orthodox	5.1%
Other Christians	8.9%
Islam	6.9%
Rodnovery and other native faiths	0.7%
Spiritual but not religious	29%
Atheism and irreligion	14.5%
Other and undeclared	4%

According to a 2012 survey, 30.9% of the population of Chelyabinsk Oblast adheres to the Russian Orthodox Church, 8% are unaffiliated generic Christians, 5% adheres to other Eastern Orthodox Churches, 8% of the population is Muslim, 1% adheres to Slavic Rodnovery (Slavic Neopaganism), and 0.4% to forms of Hinduism (Vedism, Krishnaism or Tantrism). In addition, 29% of the population deems itself to be "spiritual but not religious", 14% is atheist, and 4.7% follows other religions or did not give an answer to the question.

== Economy ==
The largest companies in the region include Magnitogorsk Iron and Steel Works, Chelyabinsk Metallurgical Plant (Mechel group), Chelyabinsk Pipe Rolling Plant, Chelyabinsk Electrometallurgical Plant, Chelyabinsk Zinc Plant, Ashinsky Metallurgical Plant.

== Sights ==
=== Taganay National Park ===
Taganay National Park is located northeast of the city of Zlatoust, Chelyabinsk Oblast. Taganay National Park is a popular tourist destination in the Urals. The park contains mountain ranges, alpine meadows, stone outcrops and a several kilometer stone river, forests, woodlands and mountain tundra, ancient mineral mines and mountain rivers flowing both to Europe and Asia. Taganay National Park was established on 5 March 1991, the first in the Urals.

=== Gagarin Park ===
Gagarin Central Park is a 12-hectare (30-acre) recreational space in Chelyabinsk. The park is named after Yuri Gagarin, a Soviet cosmonaut and the first person to enter space. The park contains forest walks, lakes, old quarries, and landscaped gardens. There is also a showground with rides.

=== Monuments ===
There are several monuments in Chelyabinsk, many of which are on Kirovka street, a pedestrian street in the center of Chelyabinsk. The monuments include a monument to Igor Kurchatov, a nuclear scientist, which opened in 1986 to the 250th anniversary of Chelyabinsk; a monument to Orlenok, on the Aloe polye in Chelyabinsk, which opened on 29 October 1958 on the day of the fortieth anniversary of the Komsomol; the Sculpture of the Postman; the Memorial to Law and Order Soldiers; the Monument to Soldiers-Internationalists; and a sculpture of a firefighter.

== Partner cities ==
Chelyabinsk Oblast cooperates with:

- Ashgabat, Turkmenistan (1997)

== See also ==
- List of Chairmen of the Legislative Assembly of Chelyabinsk Oblast
