= Korkino, Chelyabinsk Oblast =

Korkino Коркино
- Town
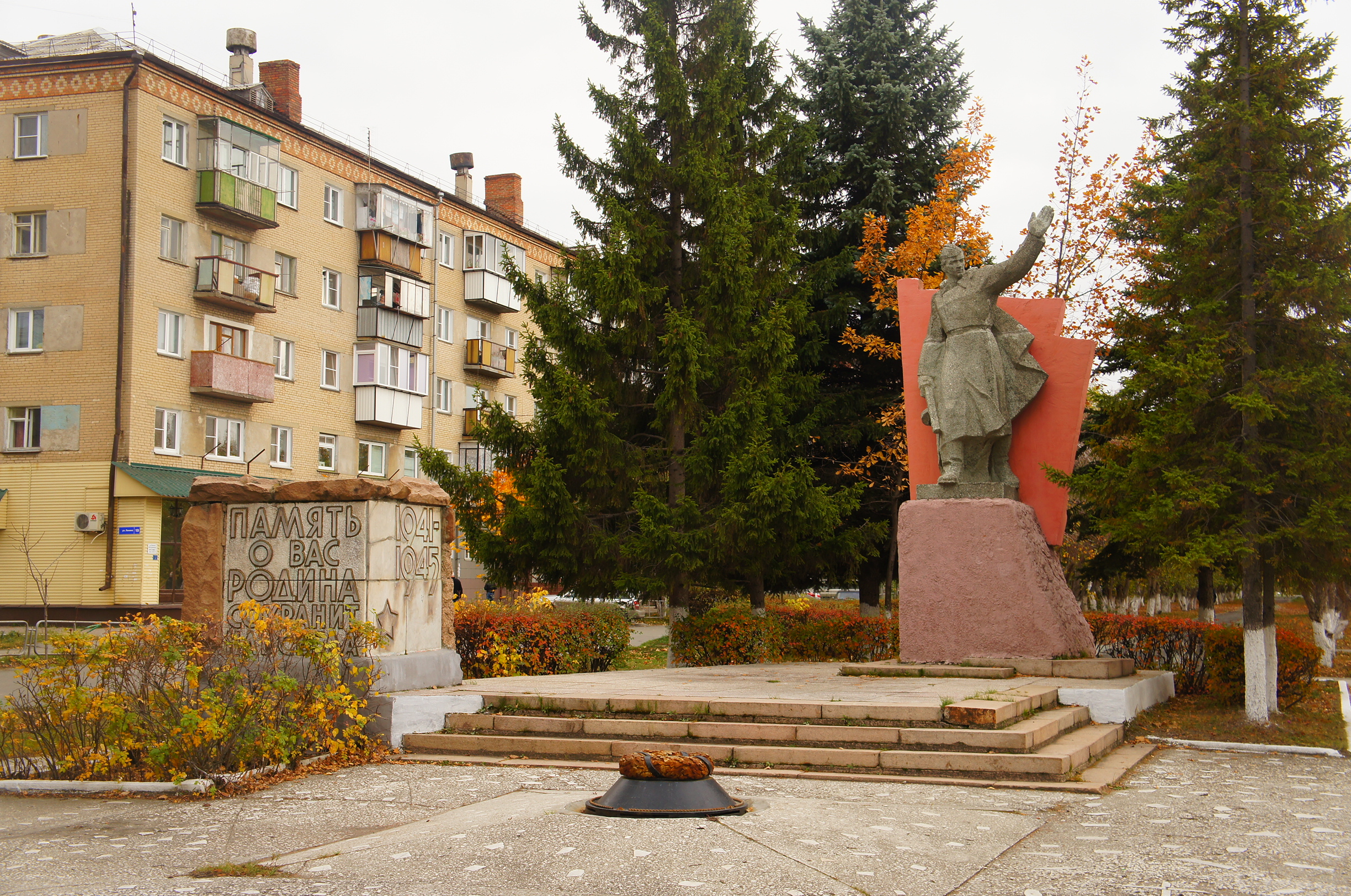

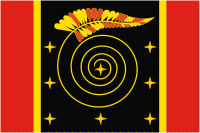
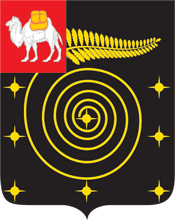
- Flag Coat of arms
- Interactive map of Korkino
- Location of Korkino Korkino (Chelyabinsk Oblast)
- Coordinates: 54°54′N 61°25′E
- Country: Russia
- Federal subject: Chelyabinsk Oblast
- Administrative district: Korkinsky District
- TownSelsoviet: Korkino
- Founded: second half of the 18th century
- Town status since: October 2, 1942
- Elevation: 243 m (797 ft)

Population (2010 Census)
  - Total: 38,597
  - Estimate (2025): 35,832 (−7.2%)

Administrative status
  - Capital of: Korkinsky District, Town of Korkino

Municipal status
  - Municipal district: Korkinsky Municipal District
  - Urban settlement: Korkinskoye Urban Settlement
  - Capital of: Korkinsky Municipal District, Korkinskoye Urban Settlement
- Time zone: UTC+5 (MSK+2)
- Postal codes: 456550, 456551, 456554, 456555, 456559
- OKTMO ID: 75633101001
- Website: www.korkino74.ru

Korkino (Russian: Ко́ркино) is a town and the administrative center of Korkinsky District in Chelyabinsk Oblast, Russia, located on the eastern slope of the Southern Ural Mountains, 42 kilometers (26 mi) south of Chelyabinsk, the administrative center of the oblast. Population: 38,597 (2010 census); 41,501 (2002 census); 45,198 (1989 Soviet census).

Historical population
Year	Pop.	±%
1939	11,600	—
1959	84,962	+632.4%
1970	70,890	−16.6%
1979	63,253	−10.8%
1989	45,198	−28.5%
2002	41,501	−8.2%
2010	38,597	−7.0%
2021	37,224	−3.6%
Population size may be affected by changes in administrative divisions. Source: Censuses

== History ==
Korkino was founded as a village in the second half of the 18th century, and was granted town status on October 2, 1942, in the midst of the Second World War, at a time when much of the Soviet Union’s heavy industry was relocated away from the fighting on the Eastern Front to more isolated areas like the Ural Mountains.

On October 24, 2024, residents of the local gypsy quarter killed a Russian female taxi driver, which provoked a pogrom. Local residents besieged several houses and turned over cars, at least two persons were wounded.

== Administrative and municipal status ==
Within the framework of administrative divisions, Korkino serves as the administrative center of Korkinsky District. As an administrative division, it is, together with two rural localities, incorporated within Korkinsky District as the Town of Korkino. As a municipal division, the Town of Korkino is incorporated within Korkinsky Municipal District as Korkinskoye Urban Settlement.

== Economy ==
Korkino was an important coal-mining center during both the Russian Empire and Soviet periods. Coal is no longer mined in the city; the mine is flooded with water.

== Notable people ==
Mountain climber Anatoli Boukreev was born here in 1958. Professional hockey player and NHL all-star left wing Artemi Panarin was raised by his grandparents in Korkino. He currently plays for the Los Angeles Kings.

== Paleontology ==
A coal open-pit mine containing Upper Triassic deposits is located five kilometers from the town. In 2026, fossils of several plants and the wing of a giant palaeontinid cicada featuring a pair of large eyespots were discovered there. D. E. Shcherbakov assigned the insect to a new genus and species, Uralontina khamitovi.
