= Mezhozyorny =

Mezhozyorny Межозёрный
- Urban-type settlement
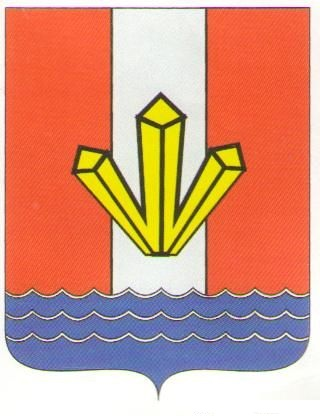
- Coat of arms
- Interactive map of Mezhozyorny
- Location of Mezhozyorny Mezhozyorny (Chelyabinsk Oblast)
- Coordinates: 54.1479°N 59.3757°E
- Country: Russia
- Federal subject: Chelyabinsk Oblast
- Administrative district: Verkhneuralsky District
- Founded: 1956

Population (2010 Census)
  - Total: 7,357
  - Estimate (2025): 6,400 (−13%)
- Time zone: UTC+5 (MSK+2)
- Postal code: 457677
- OKTMO ID: 75617153051

Mezhozyorny (Russian: Межозёрный) is an urban locality (an urban-type settlement) in Verkhneuralsky District of Chelyabinsk Oblast, Russia. Population: 7,357 (2010 census); 8,282 (2002 census); 7,248 (1989 Soviet census).
