= List of chairmen of the Legislative Assembly of Chelyabinsk Oblast =

The chairman of the Legislative Assembly of Chelyabinsk Oblast (Russian: Председатель Законодательного Собрания Челябинской области) is the presiding officer of the regional legislature.

== Office-holders ==
Name	Took office	Lest office
Vyacheslav Skvortsov	1994	1995
Viktor Davydov	1995	2005
Vladimir Myakush	2005	Present

== Sources ==
- The Legislative Assembly of Chelyabinsk Oblast
