= Vishnyovogorsk =

Urban locality in Chelyabinsk Oblast, Russia

Vishnyovogorsk Вишнёвогорск
- Urban-type settlement
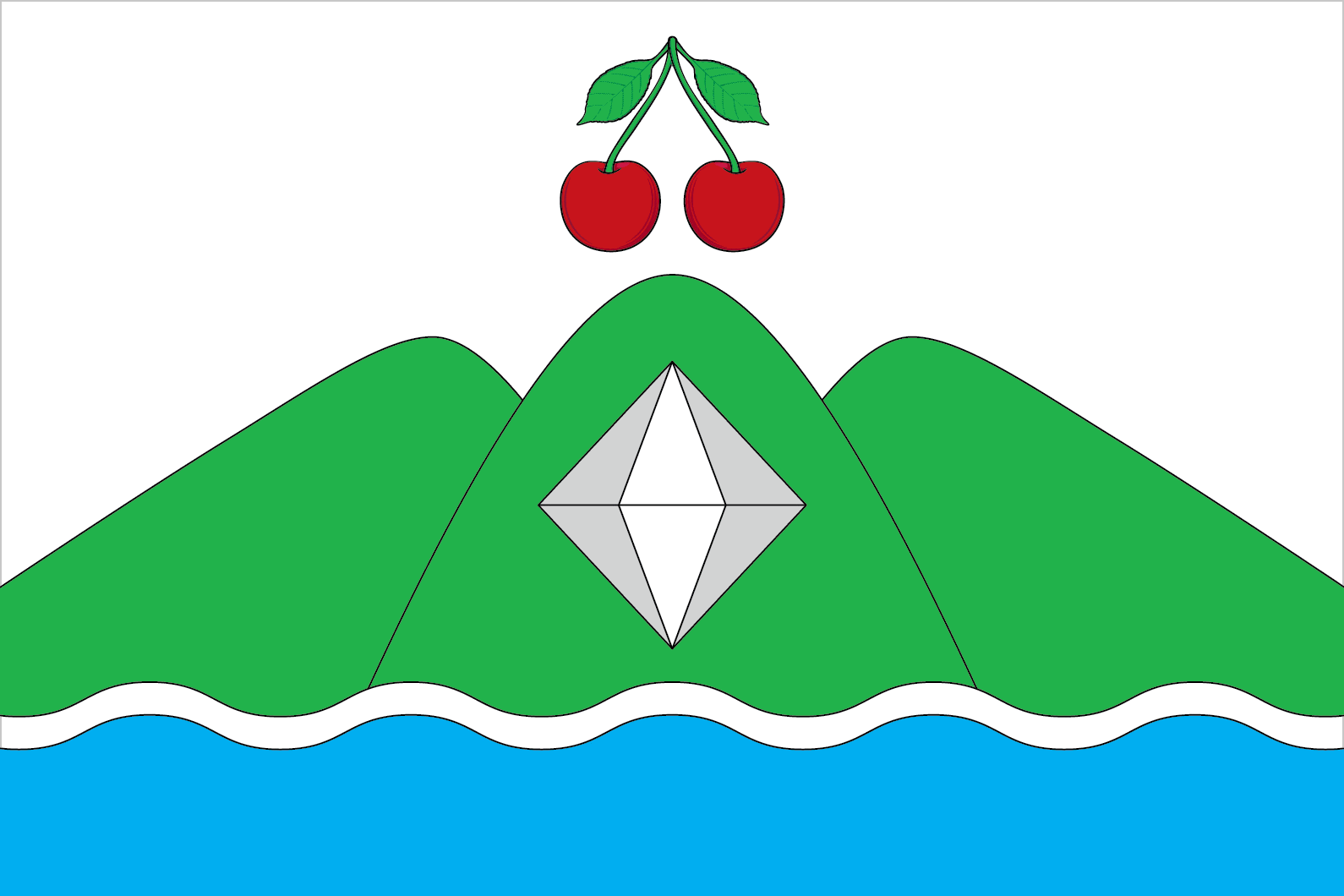
- Flag
- Interactive map of Vishnyovogorsk
- Location of Vishnyovogorsk Vishnyovogorsk (Chelyabinsk Oblast)
- Coordinates: 55°59′44″N 60°39′37″E
- Country: Russia
- Federal subject: Chelyabinsk Oblast
- Administrative district: Kaslinsky District
- Founded: 1943

Population (2010 Census)
  - Total: 4,569
  - Estimate (2025): 3,934 (−13.9%)
- Time zone: UTC+5 (MSK+2)
- Postal code: 456826
- OKTMO ID: 75626153051

Vishnyovogorsk (Russian: Вишнёвогорск) is an urban-type settlement in Kaslinsky District of Chelyabinsk Oblast, Russia. Population: 4,569 (2010 census); 5,076 (2002 census); 6,268 (1989 Soviet census).
