= Yuzhny, Nagaybaksky District, Chelyabinsk Oblast =

Yuzhny Южный
- Urban-type settlement
- Interactive map of Yuzhny
- Location of Yuzhny Yuzhny (Chelyabinsk Oblast)
- Coordinates: 53.5294°N 60.0788°E
- Country: Russia
- Federal subject: Chelyabinsk Oblast
- Administrative district: Nagaybaksky District
- Founded: 1947
- Elevation: 378 m (1,240 ft)

Population (2010 Census)
  - Total: 1,995
  - Estimate (2025): 1,458 (−26.9%)
- Time zone: UTC+5 (MSK+2)
- Postal code: 457653
- OKTMO ID: 75642154051

Yuzhny (Russian: Южный) is an urban locality (an urban-type settlement) in Nagaybaksky District of Chelyabinsk Oblast, Russia. Population: 1,995 (2010 census); 2,159 (2002 census); 2,683 (1989 Soviet census).
