= Flag of Chelyabinsk Oblast =

- Use: Civil flag
- Proportion: 2:3
- Adopted: 27 December 2001

The flag of Chelyabinsk Oblast was adopted on 27 December 2001.

The flag consists of a rectangle with width-length ratio of 2:3 with a red background. At the bottom there is a yellow stripe that is equal to 1/6 of the total width, this strip is located at a distance of 1/6 of the total width from the lower edge. In the middle of the flag there is the image of a Bactrian camel with a yellow stripe that represents the Ural Mountains.
