= Kropachyovo =

Urban locality in Chelyabinsk Oblast, Russia

Kropachyovo Кропачёво
- Urban-type settlement
- Interactive map of Kropachyovo
- Location of Kropachyovo Kropachyovo (Chelyabinsk Oblast)
- Coordinates: 55°00′47″N 57°59′04″E
- Country: Russia
- Federal subject: Chelyabinsk Oblast
- Administrative district: Ashinsky District
- Elevation: 415 m (1,362 ft)

Population (2010 Census)
  - Total: 5,018
  - Estimate (2025): 4,107 (−18.2%)
- Time zone: UTC+5 (MSK+2)
- Postal code: 456030
- OKTMO ID: 75609153051

Kropachyovo (Russian: Кропачёво) is an urban-type settlement in Ashinsky District of Chelyabinsk Oblast, Russia. Population: 5,018 (2010 census); 5,290 (2002 census); 5,602 (1989 Soviet census).
