= Korkinsky District =

Korkinsky District Коркинский район (Russian)
- District
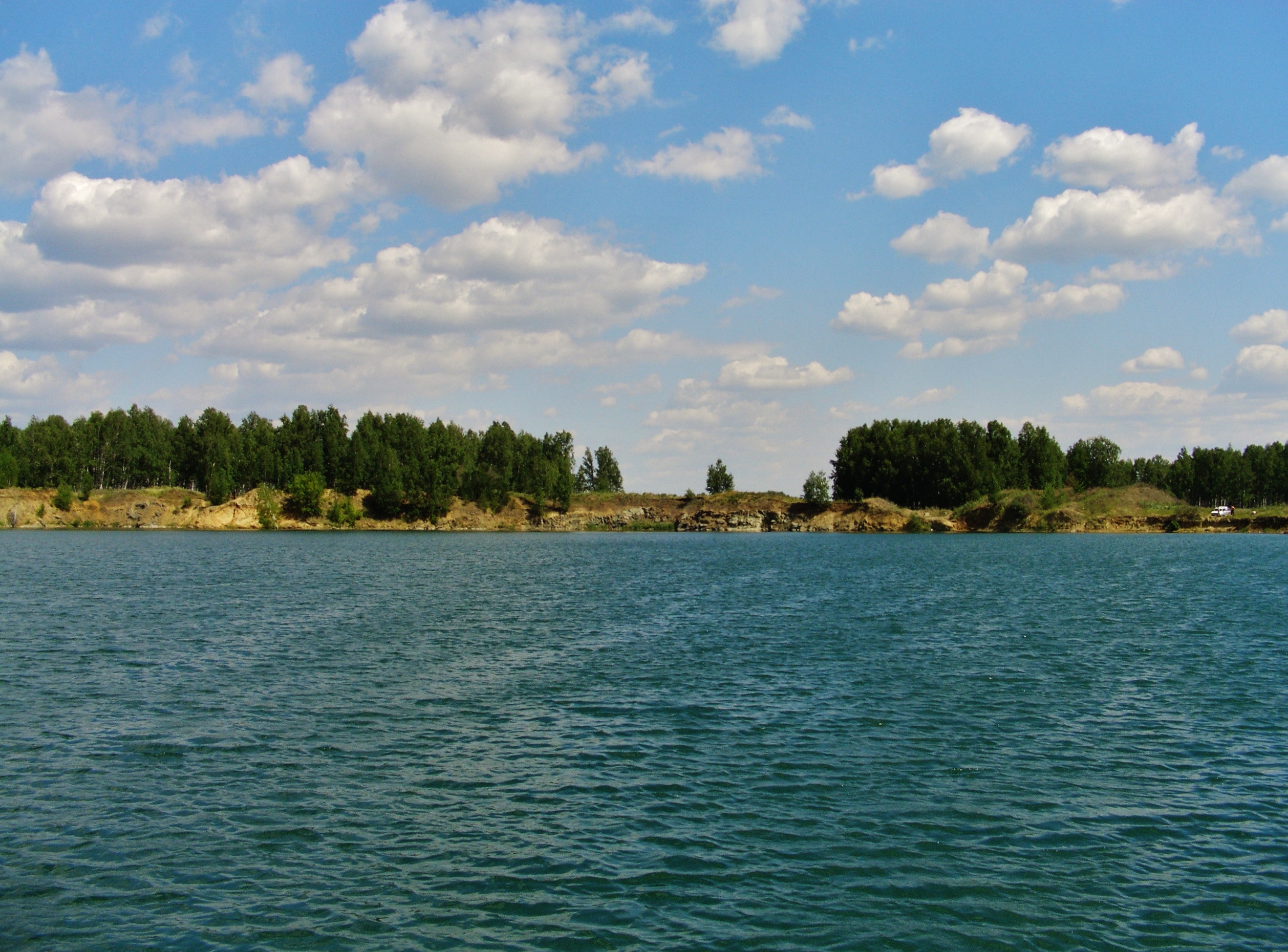
- Landscape in Korkinsky District

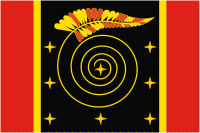
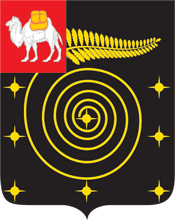
- Flag Coat of arms
- Location of Korkinsky District in Chelyabinsk Oblast
- Coordinates: 54°53′N 61°24′E
- Country: Russia
- Federal subject: Chelyabinsk Oblast
- Administrative center: Korkino

Area
  - Total: 102.76 km^{2} (39.68 sq mi)

Population (2010 Census)
  - Total: 24,314
  - Density: 236.61/km^{2} (612.82/sq mi)
  - Urban: 97.7%
  - Rural: 2.3%

Administrative structure
  - Administrative divisions: 1 Towns, 2 Work settlements
  - Inhabited localities: 1 cities/towns, 2 urban-type settlements, 4 rural localities

Municipal structure
  - Municipally incorporated as: Korkinsky Municipal District
  - Municipal divisions: 3 urban settlements, 0 rural settlements
- Time zone: UTC+5 (MSK+2)
- OKTMO ID: 75633000
- Website: http://www.korkino-raion.ru/

Korkinsky District (Russian: Коркинский райо́н) is an administrative and municipal district (raion), one of the twenty-seven in Chelyabinsk Oblast, Russia. It is located in the center of the oblast. The area of the district is 102.76 square kilometers (39.68 sq mi). Its administrative center is the town of Korkino. Population (excluding the administrative center): 24,314 (2010 census).
