= Magnitka (urban-type settlement) =

Magnitka Магнитка
- Urban-type settlement
- Interactive map of Magnitka
- Location of Magnitka Magnitka (Chelyabinsk Oblast)
- Coordinates: 55.3446°N 59.6990°E
- Country: Russia
- Federal subject: Chelyabinsk Oblast
- Administrative district: Kusinsky District

Population (2010 Census)
  - Total: 5,170
  - Estimate (2025): 3,747 (−27.5%)
- Time zone: UTC+5 (MSK+2)
- Postal code: 456950
- OKTMO ID: 75638153051

Magnitka (Russian: Магнитка) is an urban locality (an urban-type settlement) in Kusinsky District of Chelyabinsk Oblast, Russia. Population: 5,170 (2010 census); 5,826 (2002 census); 7,198 (1989 Soviet census).
