= Nyazepetrovsky District =

Nyazepetrovsky District Нязепетровский район (Russian)
- District
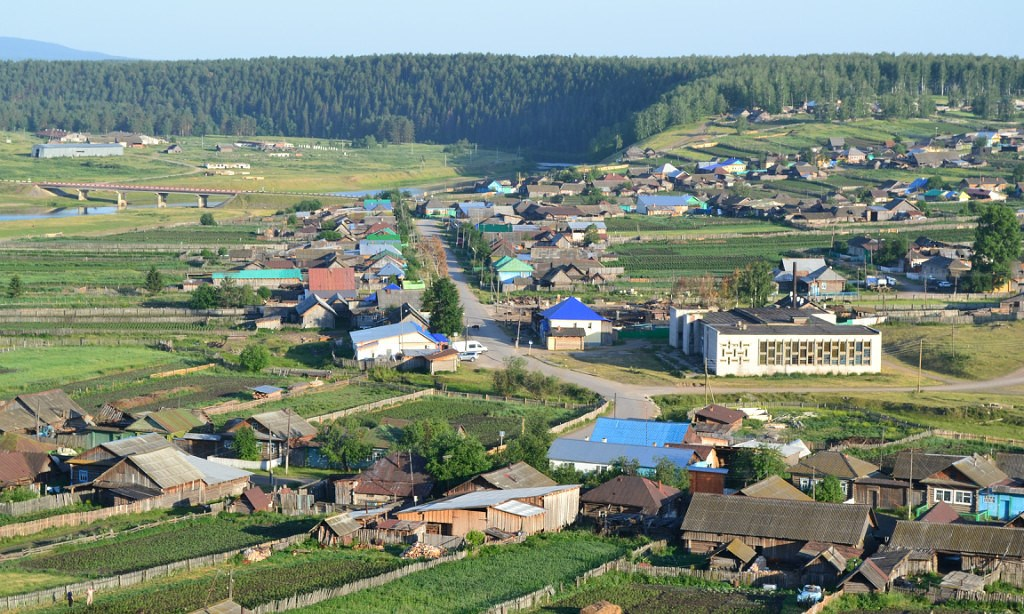
- Ufa River, Nyazapetrovsky District

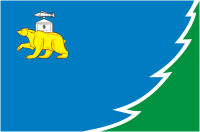
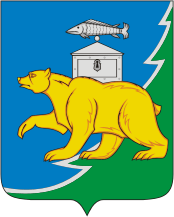
- Flag Coat of arms
- Location of Nyazepetrovsky District in Chelyabinsk Oblast
- Coordinates: 56°03′N 59°36′E
- Country: Russia
- Federal subject: Chelyabinsk Oblast
- Administrative center: Nyazepetrovsk

Area
  - Total: 3,459 km^{2} (1,336 sq mi)

Population (2010 Census)
  - Total: 18,261
  - Density: 5.279/km^{2} (13.67/sq mi)
  - Urban: 68.2%
  - Rural: 31.8%

Administrative structure
  - Administrative divisions: 1 Towns, 4 Selsoviets
  - Inhabited localities: 1 cities/towns, 29 rural localities

Municipal structure
  - Municipally incorporated as: Nyazepetrovsky Municipal District
  - Municipal divisions: 1 urban settlements, 4 rural settlements
- Time zone: UTC+5 (MSK+2)
- OKTMO ID: 75644000
- Website: http://www.nzpr.ru/

Nyazepetrovsky District (Russian: Нязепетро́вский райо́н) is an administrative and municipal district (raion), one of the twenty-seven in Chelyabinsk Oblast, Russia. It is located in the northwest of the oblast. The area of the district is 3,459 square kilometers (1,336 sq mi). Its administrative center is the town of Nyazepetrovsk. Population: 18,261 (2010 census); 21,527 (2002 Census); 27,767 (1989 Soviet census). The population of Nyazepetrovsk accounts for 68.2% of the district's total population.
