= Yemanzhelinsk =

Yemanzhelinsk Еманжелинск
- Town
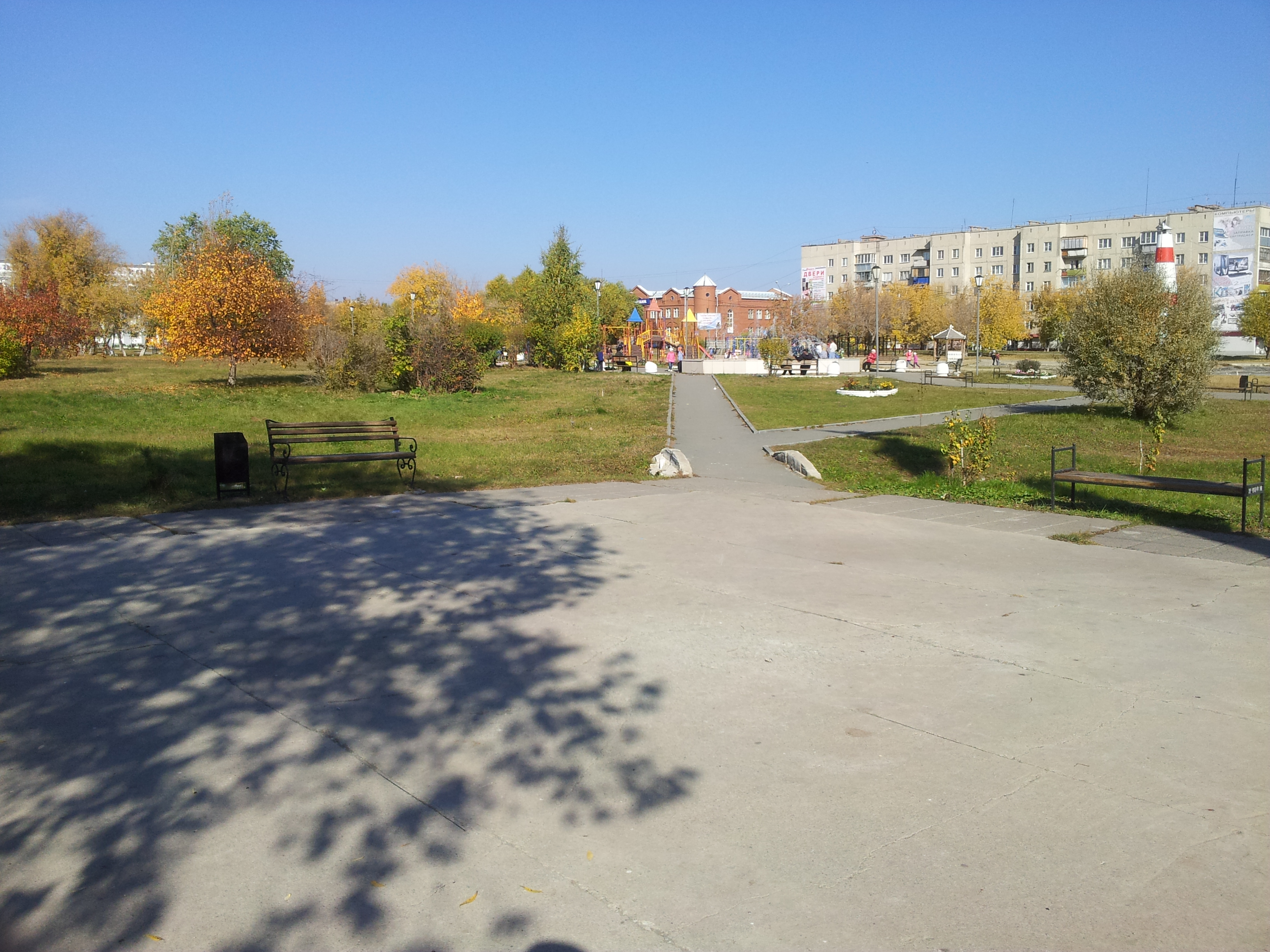

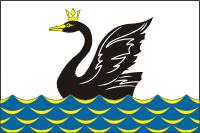
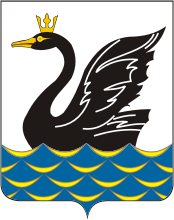
- Flag Coat of arms
- Interactive map of Yemanzhelinsk
- Location of Yemanzhelinsk Yemanzhelinsk (Chelyabinsk Oblast)
- Coordinates: 54°46′N 61°20′E
- Country: Russia
- Federal subject: Chelyabinsk Oblast
- Administrative district: Yemanzhelinsky District
- TownSelsoviet: Yemanzhelinsk
- Founded: 1770
- Town status since: September 25, 1951
- Elevation: 220 m (720 ft)

Population (2010 Census)
  - Total: 30,216
  - Estimate (2025): 27,290 (−9.7%)

Administrative status
  - Capital of: Yemanzhelinsky District, Town of Yemanzhelinsk

Municipal status
  - Municipal district: Yemanzhelinsky Municipal District
  - Urban settlement: Yemanzhelinskoye Urban Settlement
  - Capital of: Yemanzhelinsky Municipal District, Yemanzhelinskoye Urban Settlement
- Time zone: UTC+5 (MSK+2)
- Postal codes: 456580–456582, 456584
- Dialing code: +7 35138
- OKTMO ID: 75619101001
- Website: emanjelinsk.ru

Yemanzhelinsk (Russian: Еманжели́нск) is a town and the administrative center of Yemanzhelinsky District in Chelyabinsk Oblast, Russia, located near the border with Kazakhstan on the eastern slopes of the Southern Ural Mountains, 50 kilometers (31 mi) south of Chelyabinsk, the administrative center of the oblast. Population: 30,216 (2010 census); 30,202 (2002 census); 31,153 (1989 Soviet census).

== History ==
Founded in 1770 as a Cossack village, it has been known as the stanitsa of Yemanzhelinskaya (Еманжелинская) since 1866. It became a coal mining settlement in 1930–1931, which was granted town status on September 25, 1951. It was one of the places closest to the hypocenter of the blast from the 2013 Russian meteor event.

== Administrative and municipal status ==
Within the framework of administrative divisions, Yemanzhelinsk serves as the administrative center of Yemanzhelinsky District. As an administrative division, it is, together with three rural localities, incorporated within Yemanzhelinsky District as the Town of Yemanzhelinsk. As a municipal division, the Town of Yemanzhelinsk is incorporated within Yemanzhelinsky Municipal District as Yemanzhelinskoye Urban Settlement.

== Notable people ==
- Leontii Voitovych (1951–2023), academic historian
- Evgeny Bareev (b. 1966), chess grandmaster
- Irina Shayk (b. 1986), model
