= OKATO =

Russian register of administrative divisions

Russian Classification on Objects of Administrative Division (Russian: Общеросси́йский классифика́тор объе́ктов администрати́вно-территориа́льного деле́ния), or OKATO (Russian: ОКАТО), also called All-Russian classification on units of administrative and territorial distribution in English, is one of several Russian national registers. OKATO's purpose is organization of information about structure of the administrative divisions of the federal subjects of Russia.

The document assigns numeric codes to each administrative division of the country, which are hierarchically structured from the federal subject level down to selsoviet level; an expanded version also includes listings of individual inhabited localities within each administrative division.

OKATO is used for statistical and tax purposes. It was adopted on July 31, 1995, replacing SOATO (Designation System of Objects of Administrative Division of the Union of SSR and the Union Republics, as well as Inhabited Localities). It went into effect on January 1, 1997 and as of 2014 underwent 243 revisions. The compilation and maintenance of the OKATO data are the responsibility of the Federal State Statistics Service of Russia (Rosstat).

== See also ==
- Administrative division codes of the People's Republic of China (zh:中华人民共和国行政区划代码), a somewhat similar system used in the PRC (only down to the county level).
- OKTMO, Russian Classification on Territories of Municipal Division
