= Nyazepetrovsk =

Nyazepetrovsk Нязепетровск
- Town
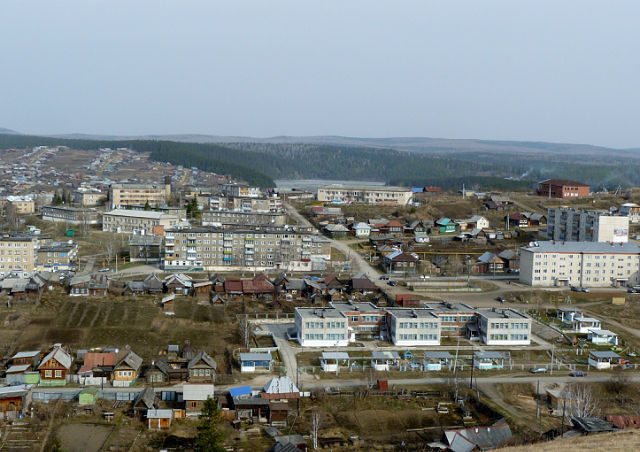
- City of Nyazepetrovsk

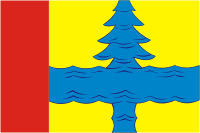
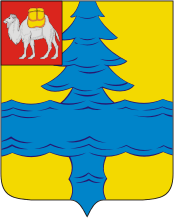
- Flag Coat of arms
- Interactive map of Nyazepetrovsk
- Location of Nyazepetrovsk Nyazepetrovsk (Chelyabinsk Oblast)
- Coordinates: 56°03′N 59°36′E
- Country: Russia
- Federal subject: Chelyabinsk Oblast
- Administrative district: Nyazepetrovsky District
- TownSelsoviet: Nyazepetrovsk
- Founded: 1747
- Town status since: 1944
- Elevation: 330 m (1,080 ft)

Population (2010 Census)
  - Total: 12,451
  - Estimate (2025): 9,939 (−20.2%)

Administrative status
  - Capital of: Nyazepetrovsky District, Town of Nyazepetrovsk

Municipal status
  - Municipal district: Nyazepetrovsky Municipal District
  - Urban settlement: Nyazepetrovskoye Urban Settlement
  - Capital of: Nyazepetrovsky Municipal District, Nyazepetrovskoye Urban Settlement
- Time zone: UTC+5 (MSK+2)
- Postal codes: 456970, 456971
- OKTMO ID: 75644101001

Nyazepetrovsk (Russian: Нязепетро́вск) is a town and the administrative center of Nyazepetrovsky District in Chelyabinsk Oblast, Russia, located on the Nyazya River (a tributary of the Ufa), 150 kilometers (93 mi) northwest of Chelyabinsk, the administrative center of the oblast. Population: 12,451 (2010 census); 13,405 (2002 census); 17,133 (1989 Soviet census).

== History ==
It was founded in 1747. Town status was granted to it in 1944.

== Administrative and municipal status ==
Within the framework of administrative divisions, Nyazepetrovsk serves as the administrative center of Nyazepetrovsky District. As an administrative division, it is, together with three rural localities, incorporated within Nyazepetrovsky District as the Town of Nyazepetrovsk. As a municipal division, the Town of Nyazepetrovsk is incorporated within Nyazepetrovsky Municipal District as Nyazepetrovskoye Urban Settlement.
