= Satka =

Town in Chelyabinsk Oblast, Russia

Satka Сатка
- Town
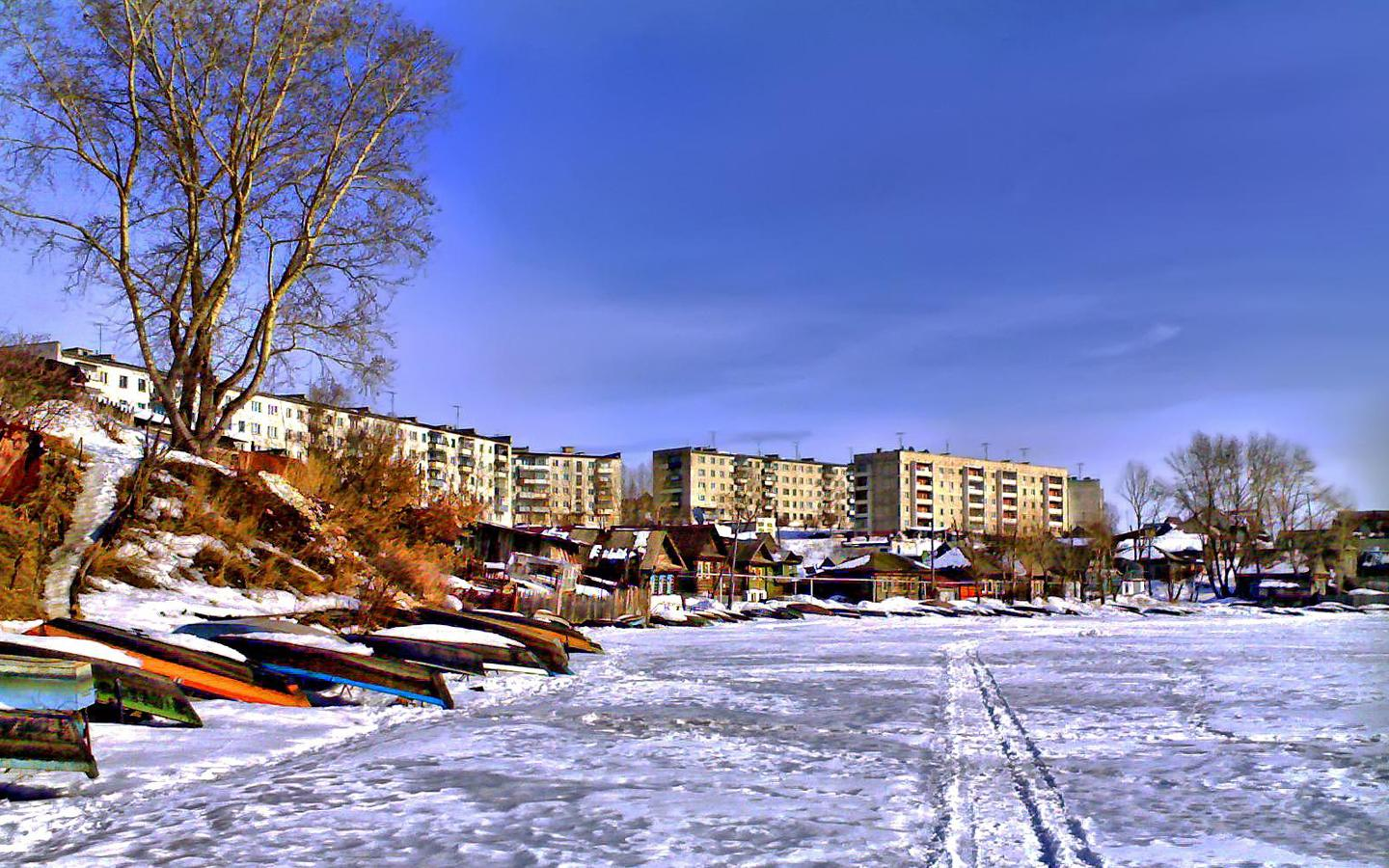
- View of Satka

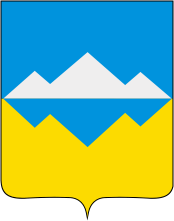
- Flag Coat of arms
- Interactive map of Satka
- Location of Satka Satka (Chelyabinsk Oblast)
- Coordinates: 55°03′N 59°02′E
- Country: Russia
- Federal subject: Chelyabinsk Oblast
- Administrative district: Satkinsky District
- TownSelsoviet: Satka
- Founded: November 19, 1758
- Elevation: 440 m (1,440 ft)

Population (2010 Census)
  - Total: 45,178
  - Estimate (2025): 41,556 (−8%)

Administrative status
  - Capital of: Satkinsky District, Town of Satka

Municipal status
  - Municipal district: Satkinsky Municipal District
  - Urban settlement: Satkinskoye Urban Settlement
  - Capital of: Satkinsky Municipal District, Satkinskoye Urban Settlement
- Time zone: UTC+5 (MSK+2)
- Postal codes: 456910, 456912–456915, 456918
- OKTMO ID: 75649101001
- Website: www.satka.org

Satka (Russian: Са́тка) is a town and the administrative center of Satkinsky District in Chelyabinsk Oblast, Russia, located on the western slope of the Southern Ural Mountains on the bank of the Satka River, 190 kilometers (120 mi) from Chelyabinsk, the administrative center of the oblast. Population: 45,178 (2010 census); 49,686 (2002 census); 50,664 (1989 Soviet census).

== History ==
It was founded on November 19, 1758 as an iron mining factory. Magnesite, a mineral essential to the manufacture of refractory brick used in blast furnaces, was discovered there.

In the beginning of the 20th century in Satka lived up to 10 thousand people. Among them are many alien people. Reached out to work the Old Believers of different sects and persuasions (the Austrians, the Pomorians, precedency, filippovtsy, fedoseevtsy etc.). There were two churches, two schools, post office, Telegraph, hospital, consumer society, two 46 industrial and commercial enterprises.

In 1824 the city was visited by Emperor Alexander I, which has a positive impact on further development of production. By the end of the 19th century, there were two blast furnaces, between the mechanical workshop and foundry in laid track. The Soviet government inherited a large production. In 1928 Satka became an urban-type settlement, and in 1937 — a city district, and since 1957 — of regional subordination.

== Administrative and municipal status ==
Within the framework of administrative divisions, Satka serves as the administrative center of Satkinsky District. As an administrative division, it is, together with ten rural localities, incorporated within Satkinsky District as the Town of Satka. As a municipal division, the Town of Satka is incorporated within Satkinsky Municipal District as Satkinskoye Urban Settlement.

== Economy ==
The major industry in the town is the extraction of magnesite and other ores along with metallurgical plants to process the ore. In the conduct of Kombinat Magnezit there is the unique current narrow gauge railroad for Russia. The expanded length of the narrow railway was about 20 kilometers. The road is completely electrified. There is a small tourist industry because of the town's location in the center of the Ural Mountains near Zyuratkul National Park. There is also a nearby historic site at Porogi where the first hydro-electric generator in Russia was installed.

Satka has a little industry and one factory.

=== Transportation ===
Although there is a railway station in Satka, it is a spur line so connections are inconvenient.

== Education ==
In addition to secondary schools, there is a satellite campus of the Chelyabinsk State University.
