= Kasli =

Kasli Касли
- Town
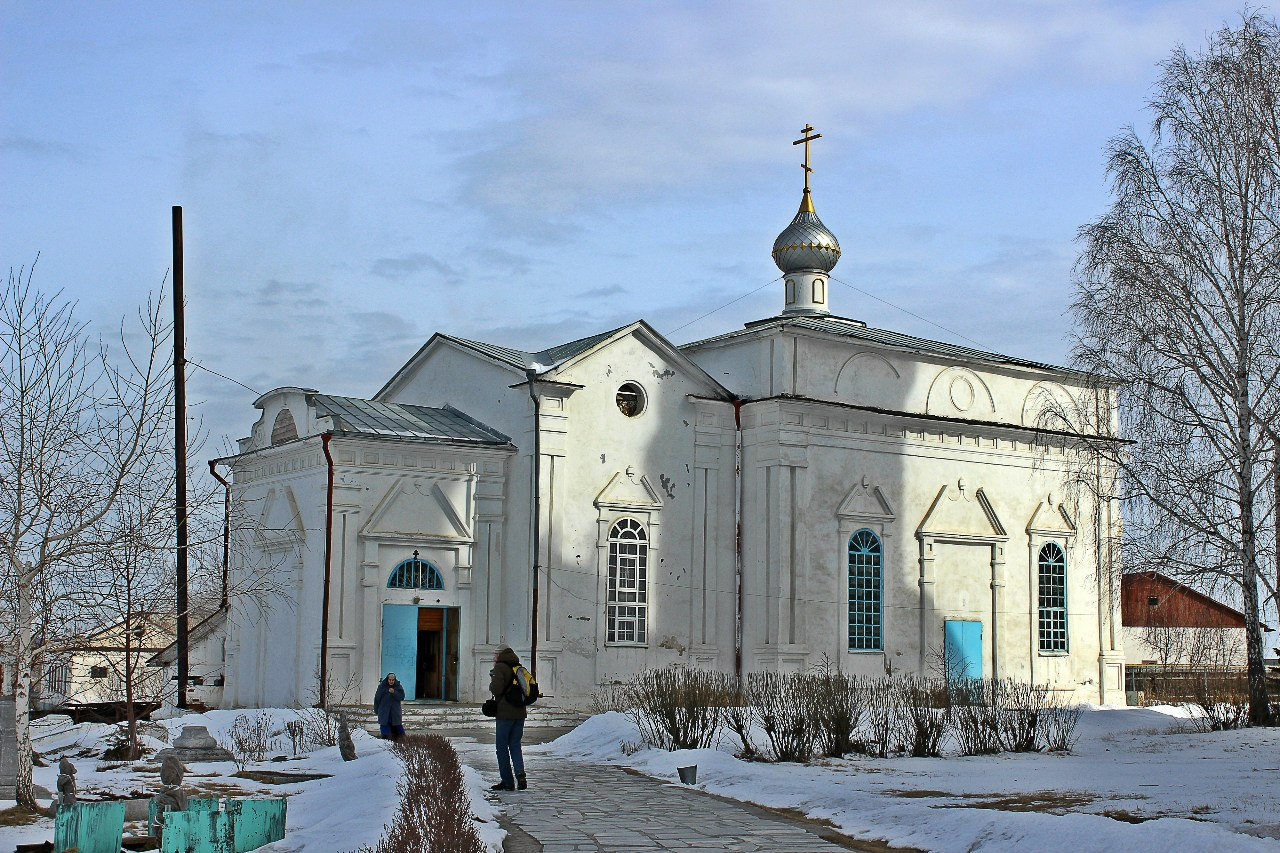
- Church of the Ascension, Kasli

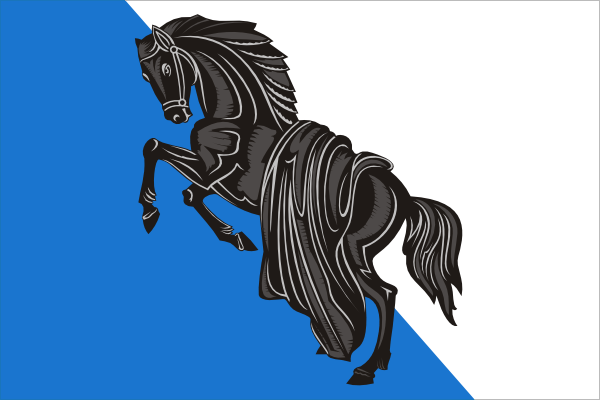
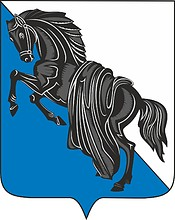
- Flag Coat of arms
- Interactive map of Kasli
- Location of Kasli Kasli (Chelyabinsk Oblast)
- Coordinates: 55°54′N 60°46′E
- Country: Russia
- Federal subject: Chelyabinsk Oblast
- Administrative district: Kaslinsky District
- TownSelsoviet: Kasli
- Founded: 1747
- Town status since: July 29, 1942

Population (2010 Census)
  - Total: 16,969
  - Estimate (2023): 15,006 (−11.6%)

Administrative status
  - Capital of: Kaslinsky District, Town of Kasli

Municipal status
  - Municipal district: Kaslinsky Municipal District
  - Urban settlement: Kaslinskoye Urban Settlement
  - Capital of: Kaslinsky Municipal District, Kaslinskoye Urban Settlement
- Time zone: UTC+5 (MSK+2)
- Postal codes: 456830, 456832–456835
- OKTMO ID: 75626101001
- Website: www.kasli.org

Kasli (Russian: Касли́) is a town and the administrative center of Kaslinsky District in Chelyabinsk Oblast, Russia, located among several lakes on the eastern slope of the Middle Urals, 87 kilometers (54 mi) northwest of Chelyabinsk, the administrative center of the oblast. Population: 16,969 (2010 census); 19,091 (2002 census); 21,530 (1989 Soviet census).

== History ==
It was founded in 1747 as the settlement of Kaslinsky (Каслинский) around a foundry. Town status was granted to it on July 29, 1942.

The Kasli plant became famous for its cast iron castings in the mid-19th century. In 1900, an open-work pavilion was molded from metal for the international exhibition. It is now exhibited in the Yekaterinburg picture gallery.

== Administrative and municipal status ==
Within the framework of administrative divisions, Kasli serves as the administrative center of Kaslinsky District. As an administrative division, it is, together with one rural locality (the settlement of Prigorodny), incorporated within Kaslinsky District as the Town of Kasli. As a municipal division, the Town of Kasli is incorporated within Kaslinsky Municipal District as Kaslinskoye Urban Settlement.

== Economy ==
The leading branches of industry are non-ferrous metallurgy, machine-building, and metal-working. There is also a radio plant and a clothes factory.

Dairy and meat farming prevails in agriculture. Potato growing is developed.

== Sights ==
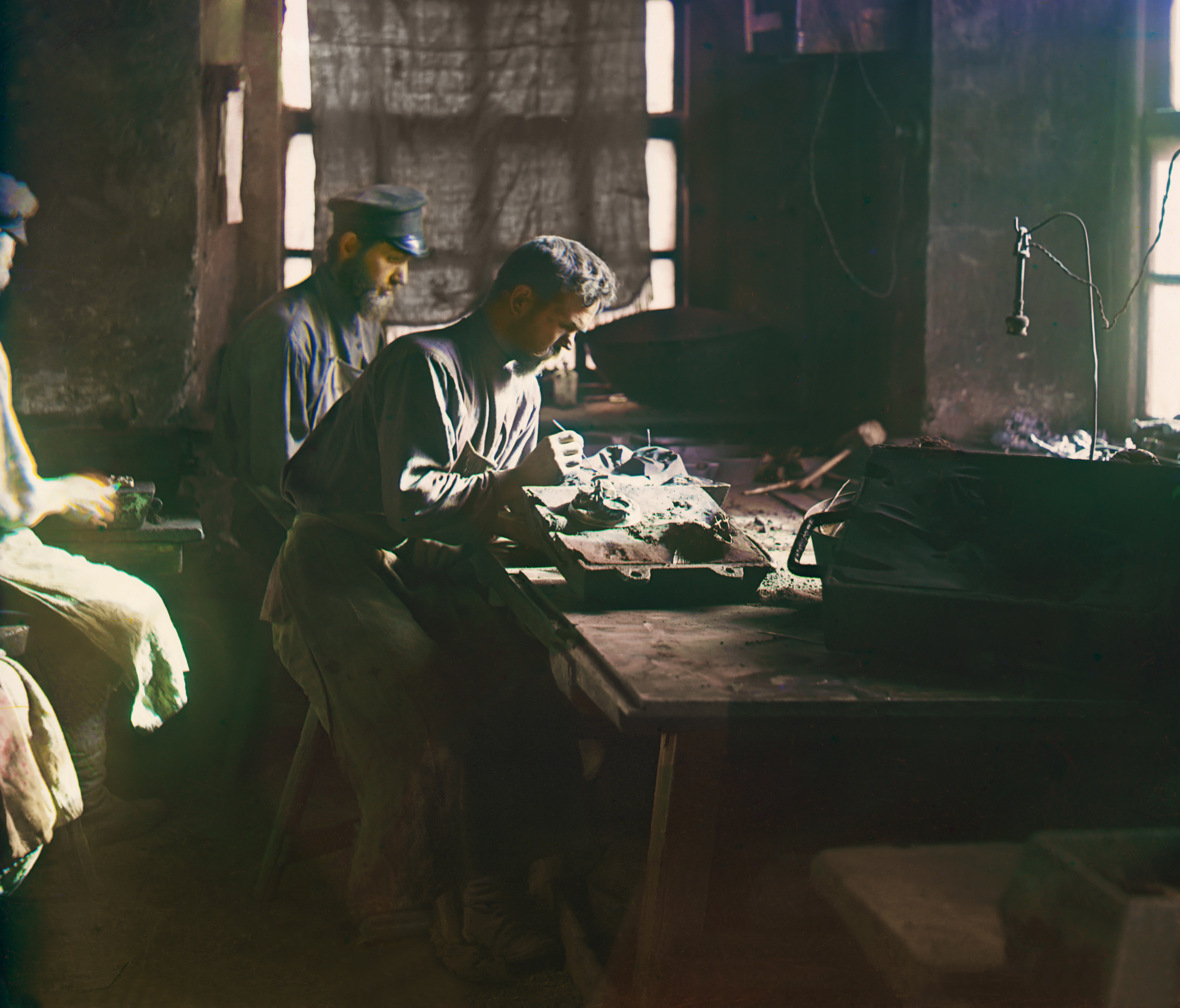
Molding of an artistic casting. Production of artistic casting at the Kasli Iron Works, Sergey Prokudin-Gorsky Collection, (Library of Congress)

Museum of decorative castings

Kasli is famous for Kasli iron sculpture—artistic figures made of cast iron. The cast sculptures of Klodt, Lancere, Solovyova, and other prominent artists are among the most famous works in the Museum of Decorative Castings. In 1860, the Kasli factory was honored with the Golden Award (the small golden medal of the Free Economical Society). A year later, the factory was awarded the Small Silver Medal at St. Petersburg's Textile exhibition. Honorable diplomas and silver and golden medals were awarded at the World Exhibitions in Paris (1867), in Vienna (1873), Philadelphia (1876), Copenhagen (1888), Stockholm (1897), and again in Paris (1900).

Many renowned historical artistic sculptures and figures at Moscow and St. Petersburg, as well as the iron furniture at the Winter Palace, was produced by the Kasli factory.
