= Yemanzhelinsky District =

Yemanzhelinsky District Еманжелинский район (Russian)
- District
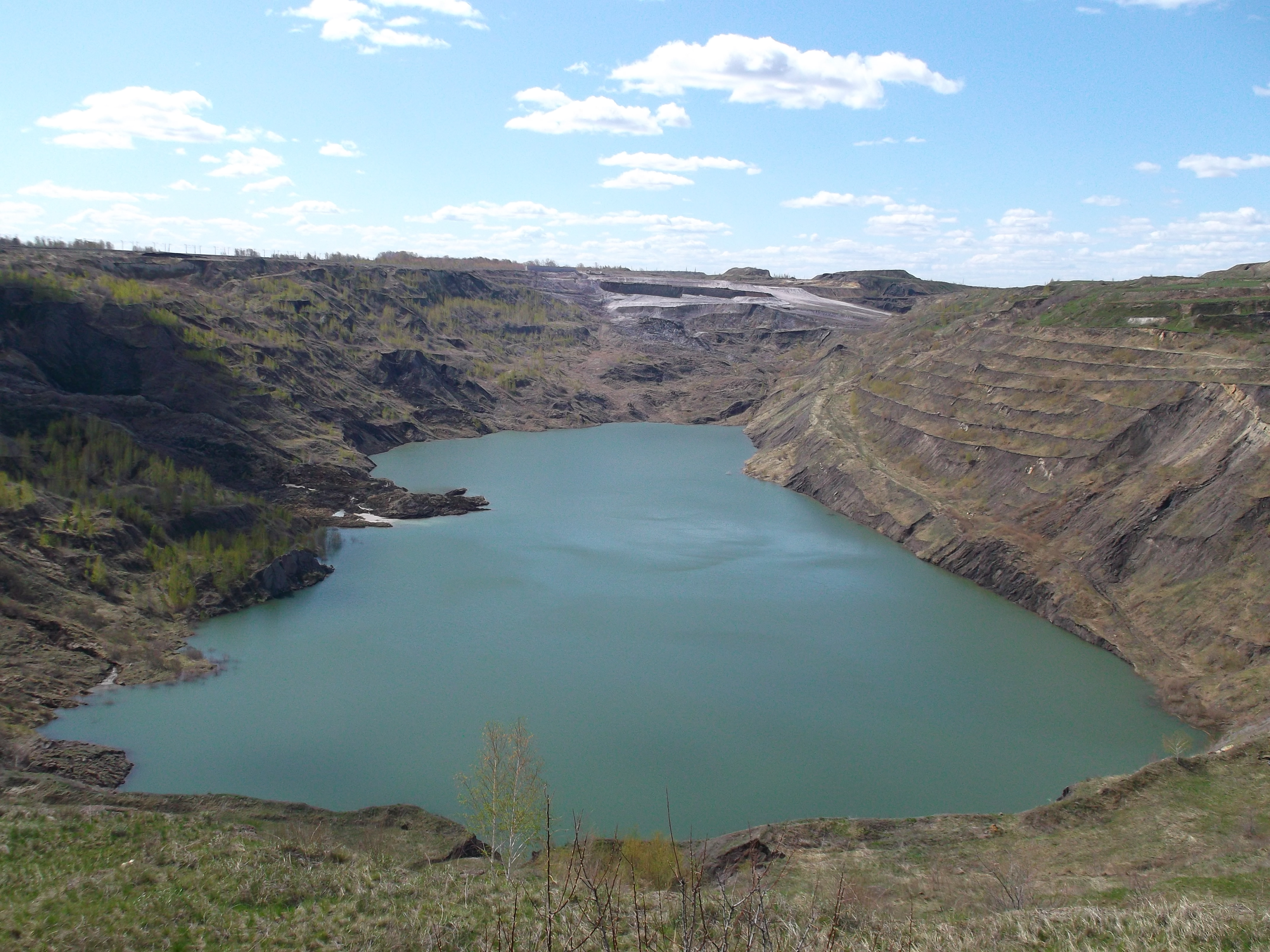
- Krasnogorsky Coal Mine, Yemanzhelinsky District

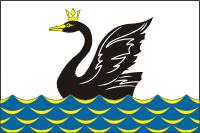
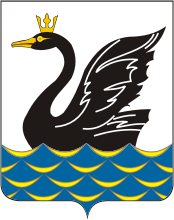
- Flag Coat of arms
- Location of Yemanzhelinsky District in Chelyabinsk Oblast
- Coordinates: 54°45′N 61°19′E
- Country: Russia
- Federal subject: Chelyabinsk Oblast
- Administrative center: Yemanzhelinsk

Area
  - Total: 129 km^{2} (50 sq mi)

Population (2010 Census)
  - Total: 21,868
  - Density: 170/km^{2} (439/sq mi)
  - Urban: 98.4%
  - Rural: 1.6%

Administrative structure
  - Administrative divisions: 1 Towns, 2 Work settlements
  - Inhabited localities: 1 cities/towns, 2 urban-type settlements, 4 rural localities

Municipal structure
  - Municipally incorporated as: Yemanzhelinsky Municipal District
  - Municipal divisions: 3 urban settlements, 0 rural settlements
- Time zone: UTC+5 (MSK+2)
- OKTMO ID: 75619000
- Website: https://www.admemr.ru/

Yemanzhelinsky District (Russian: Еманжелинский район) is an administrative and municipal district (raion), one of the twenty-seven in Chelyabinsk Oblast, Russia. It is located in the center of the oblast. The area of the district is 129 square kilometers (50 sq mi). Its administrative center is the town of Yemanzhelinsk. Population (excluding the administrative center): 21,868 (2010 census).

It is located near the border with Kazakhstan on the eastern slopes of the Southern Ural Mountains, 50km south of Chelyabinsk, the administrative center of the oblast.
