= Kaslinsky District =

Kaslinsky District Каслинский район (Russian)
- District
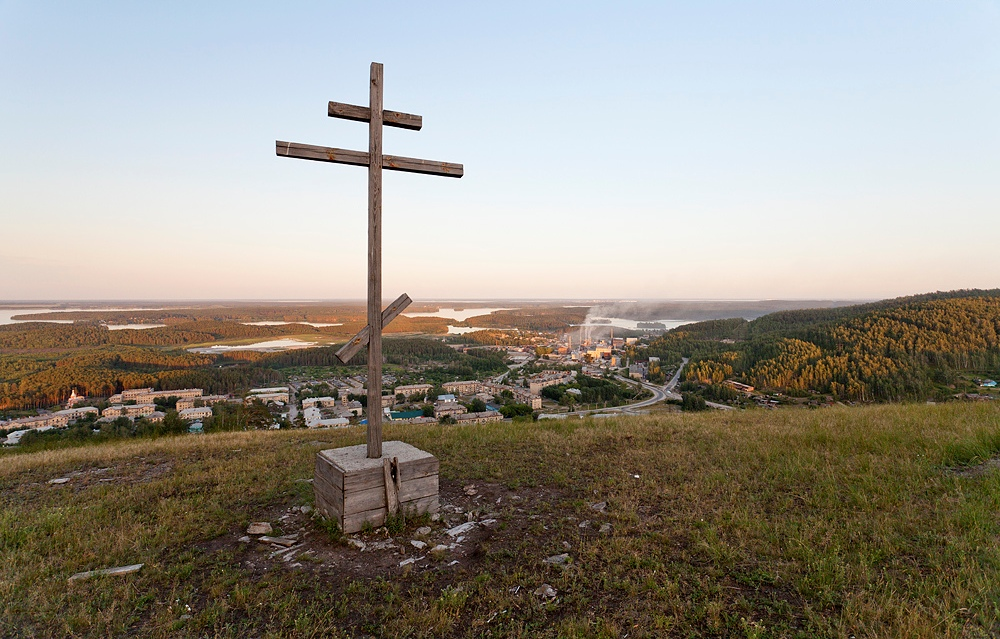
- Vishnevogorsk, Kaslinsky District

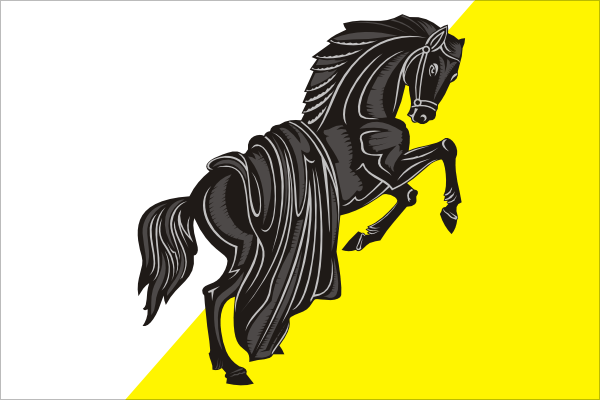
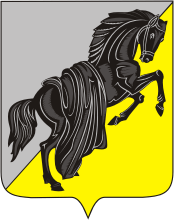
- Flag Coat of arms
- Location of Kaslinsky District in Chelyabinsk Oblast
- Coordinates: 55°53′N 60°45′E
- Country: Russia
- Federal subject: Chelyabinsk Oblast
- Established: 27 February 1924
- Administrative center: Kasli

Area
  - Total: 3,356 km^{2} (1,296 sq mi)

Population (2010 Census)
  - Total: 17,680
  - Density: 5.268/km^{2} (13.64/sq mi)
  - Urban: 25.8%
  - Rural: 74.2%

Administrative structure
  - Administrative divisions: 1 Towns, 1 Work settlements, 9 Selsoviets
  - Inhabited localities: 1 cities/towns, 1 urban-type settlements, 45 rural localities

Municipal structure
  - Municipally incorporated as: Kaslinsky Municipal District
  - Municipal divisions: 2 urban settlements, 9 rural settlements
- Time zone: UTC+5 (MSK+2)
- OKTMO ID: 75626000
- Website: http://www.kasli.org/

Kaslinsky District (Russian: Ка́слинский райо́н) is an administrative and municipal district (raion), one of the twenty-seven in Chelyabinsk Oblast, Russia. It is located in the north of the oblast. The area of the district is 3,356 square kilometers (1,296 sq mi). Its administrative center is the town of Kasli. Population (excluding the administrative center): 17,680 (2010 census); 14,955 (2002 Census); 30,627 (1989 Soviet census).

== Administrative and municipal status ==
Within the framework of administrative divisions, it has a status of a town with territorial district—a unit equal in status to administrative districts—the full name of which is The Town of Kasli and Kaslinsky District (город Касли и Каслинский район). As a municipal division, it is incorporated as Kaslinsky Municipal District.
