= Satkinsky District =

Satkinsky District Саткинский район (Russian)
- District
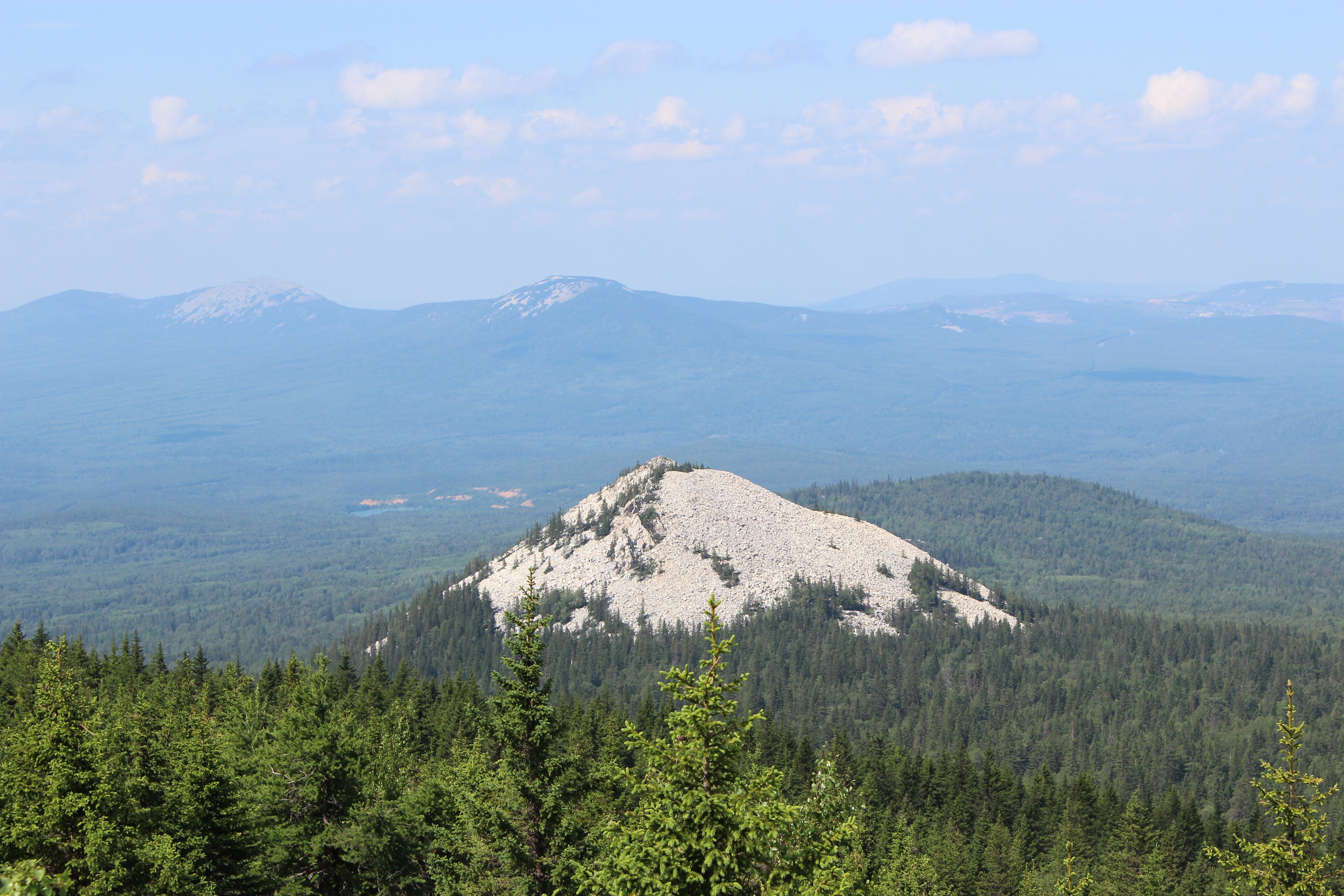
- Zyuratkul National Park, Satkinsky District

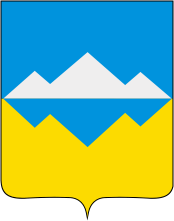
- Flag Coat of arms
- Location of Satkinsky District in Chelyabinsk Oblast
- Coordinates: 55°03′N 59°03′E
- Country: Russia
- Federal subject: Chelyabinsk Oblast
- Administrative center: Satka

Area
  - Total: 2,397 km^{2} (925 sq mi)

Population (2010 Census)
  - Total: 39,371
  - Density: 16.43/km^{2} (42.54/sq mi)
  - Urban: 89.1%
  - Rural: 10.9%

Administrative structure
  - Administrative divisions: 2 Towns, 3 Work settlements, 2 Selsoviets
  - Inhabited localities: 2 cities/towns, 3 urban-type settlements, 29 rural localities

Municipal structure
  - Municipally incorporated as: Satkinsky Municipal District
  - Municipal divisions: 5 urban settlements, 2 rural settlements
- Time zone: UTC+5 (MSK+2)
- OKTMO ID: 75649000
- Website: http://www.satadmin.ru/

Satkinsky District (Russian: Са́ткинский райо́н) is an administrative and municipal district (raion), one of the twenty-seven in Chelyabinsk Oblast, Russia. It is located in the west of the oblast. The area of the district is 2,397 square kilometers (925 sq mi). Its administrative center is the town of Satka. Population (excluding the administrative center): 39,371 (2010 census); 42,443 (2002 Census); 46,271 (1989 Soviet census).

== Geography ==
Nurgush is a 50 kilometres (31 mi) long mountain range, part of the Southern Urals, located in the district by the Zyuratkul lake. It has the highest point of Chelyabinsk Oblast, reaching 1,406 metres (4,613 ft) above sea level.

== Administrative and municipal status ==
Within the framework of administrative divisions, it has a status of a town with territorial district—a unit equal in status to administrative districts—the full name of which is The Town of Satka and Satkinsky District (город Сатка и Саткинский район). As a municipal division, it is incorporated as Satkinsky Municipal District.
