= Chebarkul (disambiguation) =

Chebarkul is a city in Russia

Chebarkul may also refer to:

- Chebarkul, Republic of Bashkortostan, village
- Chebarkul meteorite, or Chelyabinsk meteorite
- Chebarkul training ground by the city
- Lake Chebarkul by the city
- 37645 Chebarkul, minor planet
