= Chebarkulsky =

Chebarkulsky (masculine), Chebarkulskaya (feminine), or Chebarkulskoye (neuter) may refer to:

- Chebarkulsky District, a district of Chelyabinsk Oblast, Russia
- Chekarkulsky Urban Okrug, a municipal formation in Chelyabinsk Oblast, Russia, which the town of Chebarkul is incorporated as
