= Chelyabinsk meteor =

Near-Earth asteroid that fell over Russia in 2013

- Meteor fireball seen from Kamensk-Uralsky where it was still dawn, in an oblast north of Chelyabinsk Location of the meteor
- Date: 15 February 2013; 13 years ago
- Time: 09:20:28 YEKT (UTC+06:00)
- Location: Chebarkul, Chelyabinsk Oblast, Russia; 55.150°N 61.410°E
- Also known as: Chelyabinsk meteorite
- Cause: Meteor air burst
- Injuries: 1,491 indirect injuries
- Property damage: Over 7,200 buildings damaged, collapsed factory roof, shattered windows, $33 million (2013 USD) lost

The Chelyabinsk meteor (Russian: Челябинский метеорит, romanised: Chelyabinskiy meteorit) was a superbolide that entered Earth's atmosphere over the southern Ural region in Russia on 15 February 2013 at about 09:20 YEKT (03:20 UTC). It was caused by an approximately 18-meter (60 ft), 9,100-tonne (10,000-short-ton) near-Earth asteroid that entered the atmosphere at a shallow 18‐degree angle with a speed relative to Earth of about 19.2 km/s (68,980 km/h; 42,860 mph). The light from the meteor was briefly brighter than the Sun (which is about −26.7 magnitude), visible as far as 100 kilometers (62 miles) away. It was observed in a wide area of the region and in neighbouring republics. Some eyewitnesses also reported feeling intense heat from the fireball.

The object exploded in a meteor air burst over Chelyabinsk Oblast, at a height of about 30 kilometres (18.6 miles). The explosion generated a bright flash, producing a hot cloud of dust and gas that penetrated to 26 kilometres (16 mi), and many surviving small fragmentary meteorites. Most of the object's energy was absorbed by the atmosphere, creating a large shock wave. The asteroid had a total kinetic energy before atmospheric impact equivalent to the blast yield of 400–500 kilotonnes of TNT (1.7–2.1 petajoules), estimated from infrasound and seismic measurements. This was approximately 30 times as much energy as that released by the atomic bomb detonated at Hiroshima.

The object approached Earth undetected before its atmospheric entry, in part because its radiant (source direction) was close to the Sun. 1,491 people were injured seriously enough to seek medical treatment. All of the injuries were due to indirect effects rather than the meteor itself, mainly from broken glass from windows that were blown in when the shock wave arrived, minutes after the superbolide's flash. Around 7,200 buildings in six cities across the region were damaged by the explosion's shock wave, and authorities scrambled to help repair the structures in sub-freezing temperatures. No deaths were reported.

It is the largest object to have entered Earth's atmosphere since the 1908 Tunguska event, which destroyed a wide, remote, forested, and very sparsely populated area of Siberia.

The earlier-predicted and well-publicized close approach of a larger asteroid on the same day, the roughly 30 meters (100 feet) 367943 Duende, occurred about 16 hours later; the very different orbits of the two objects showed they were unrelated to each other.

== Initial reports ==
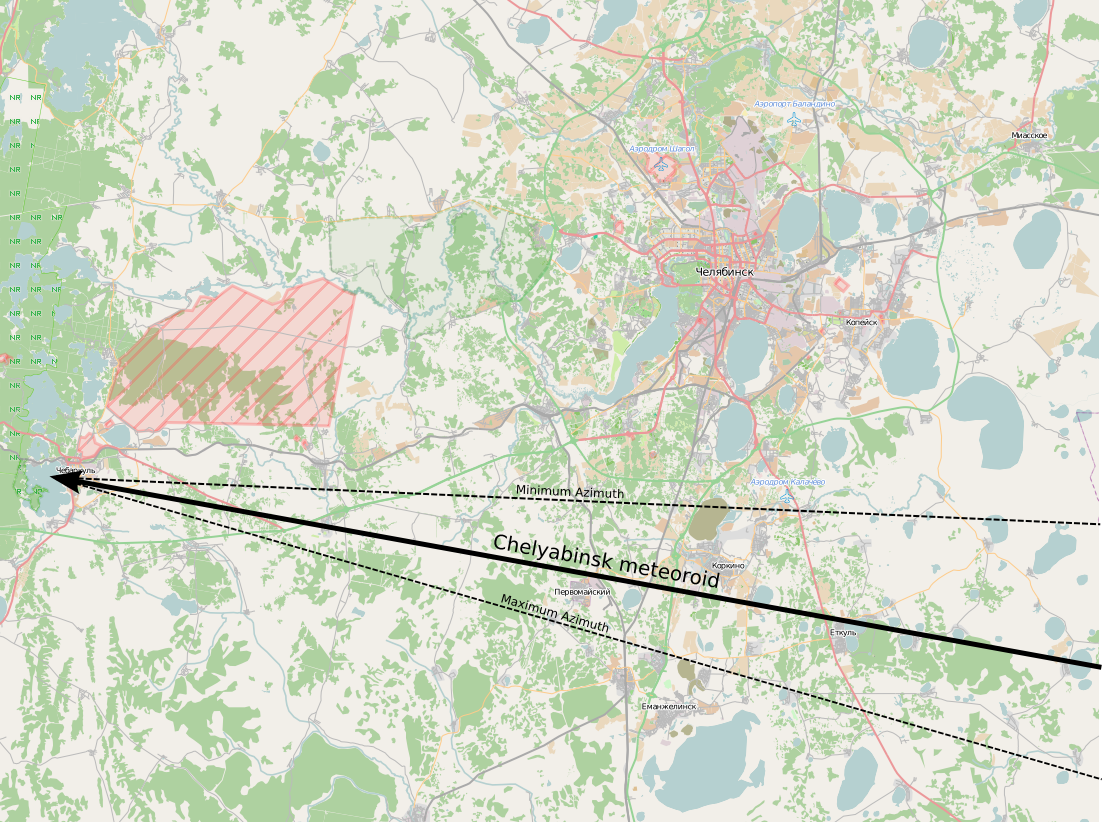
The meteor's path in relation to the ground.

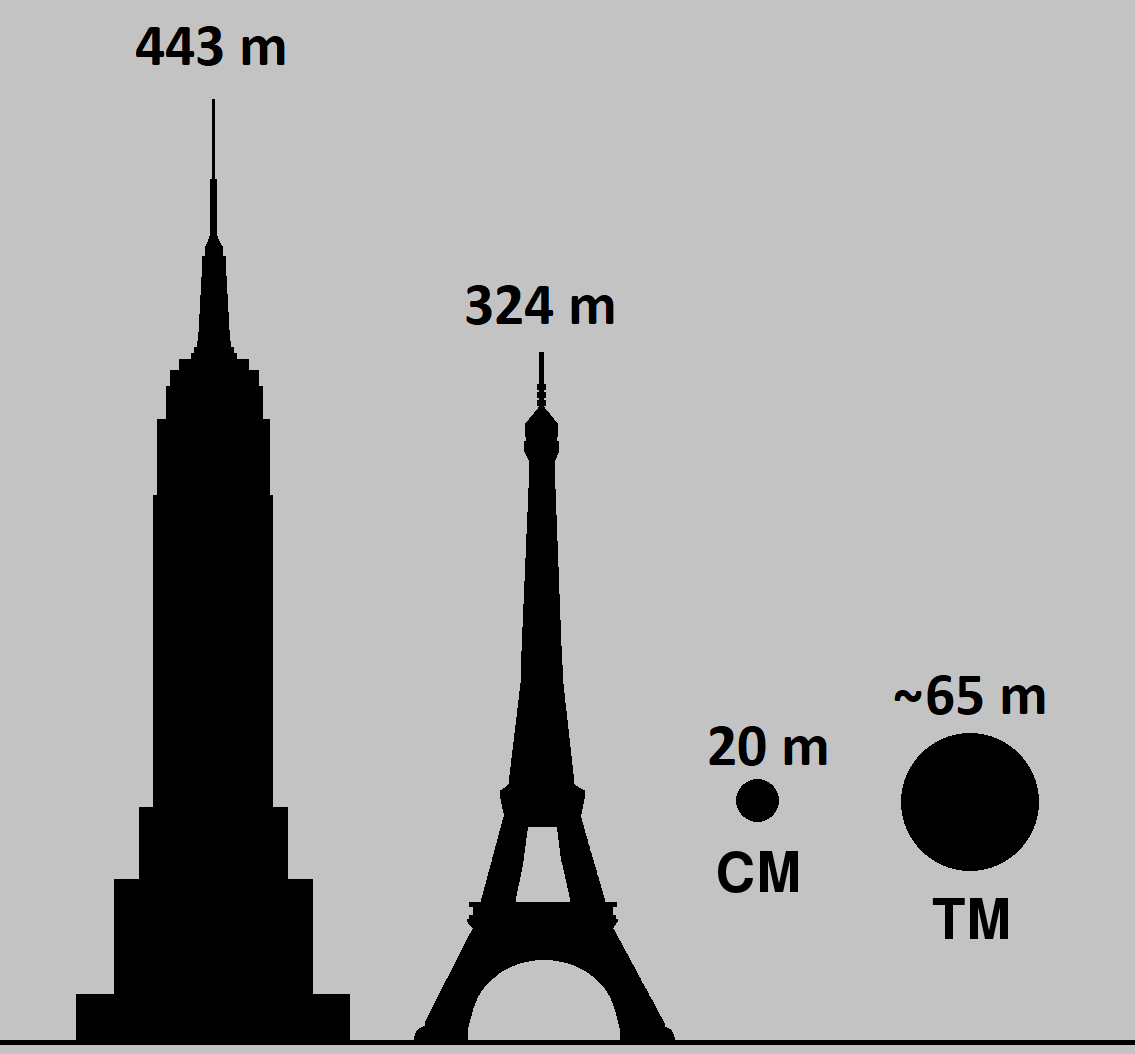
Comparison of possible sizes of the Chelyabinsk (CM mark) and Tunguska meteoroids to the Eiffel Tower and the Empire State Building.

Local residents witnessed extremely bright burning objects in the sky in Chelyabinsk, Kurgan, Sverdlovsk, Tyumen, and Orenburg Oblasts, the Republic of Bashkortostan, and in neighbouring regions in Kazakhstan, when the asteroid entered the Earth's atmosphere over Russia. Amateur videos showed a fireball streaking across the sky and a loud boom several minutes afterwards. Some eyewitnesses experienced skin and retinal burns from the fireball.

The event began at 09:20:21 Yekaterinburg time (which was UTC+6 at the time), several minutes after sunrise in Chelyabinsk, and minutes before sunrise in Yekaterinburg. According to eyewitnesses, the bolide appeared brighter than the sun, as was later confirmed by NASA. An image of the object was also taken soon after it entered the atmosphere by the weather satellite Meteosat 9. Witnesses in Chelyabinsk said that the air of the city smelled like "gunpowder", "sulfur" and "burning odors" starting about 1 hour after the fireball and lasting all day.

== Atmospheric entry ==
Illustrating all "phases", from atmospheric entry to explosion.

The visible phenomenon due to the passage of an asteroid or meteoroid through the atmosphere is termed a meteor. If the object reaches the ground, then it is termed a meteorite. During the Chelyabinsk meteoroid's traversal, there was a bright object trailing smoke, then an air burst (explosion) that caused a powerful blast wave. The latter was the only cause of the damage to thousands of buildings in Chelyabinsk and its neighbouring towns. The fragments then entered dark flight (without the emission of light) and created a strewn field of numerous meteorites on the snow-covered ground (officially named Chelyabinsk meteorites).

The last time a similar phenomenon was observed in the Chelyabinsk region was the Kunashak meteor shower of 1949, after which scientists recovered about 20 meteorites weighing more than 200 kg (440 lb) in total. The Chelyabinsk meteor is thought to be the biggest natural space object to enter Earth's atmosphere since the 1908 Tunguska event, and the only one confirmed to have resulted in many injuries, (Note: Historical, normally accurate, Chinese records of the 1490 Qingyang event describe over 10,000 deaths, but it is not confirmed as an impact event.) although a small number of panic-related injuries occurred during the Great Madrid Meteor Event of 10 February 1896.

Preliminary estimates released by the Russian Federal Space Agency indicated the object was an asteroid moving at about 30 km/s (67,110 mph) in a "low trajectory" when it entered Earth's atmosphere. According to the Russian Academy of Sciences, the meteor then pushed through the atmosphere at a velocity of 15 km/s (33,550 mph) Video recordings show the radiant of the meteor (its apparent position of origin in the sky) above and to the left of the rising Sun.

Early analysis of CCTV and dashcam video posted online indicated that the meteor approached from the southeast, and exploded about 40 km (25 mi) south of central Chelyabinsk above Korkino at a height of 23.3 kilometres (76,000 ft), with fragments continuing in the direction of Lake Chebarkul. On 1 March 2013, NASA published a detailed synopsis of the event, stating that at peak brightness (at 09:20:33 local time), the meteor was 23.3 km (76,000 ft) high, located at 54.8°N, 61.1°E. At that time it was travelling at about 18.6 kilometres per second (66,960 km/h; 41,610 mph) – almost 60 times the speed of sound. During November 2013, results were published based on a more careful calibration of dashcam videos in the field weeks after the event during a Russian Academy of Sciences field study, which estimated the point of peak brightness at 29.7 km (18.5 mi) altitude and the final disruption of the thermal debris cloud at 27.0 km (16.8 mi), settling to 26.2 km (16.3 mi), all with a possible systematic uncertainty of ±0.7 km (2,300 ft).

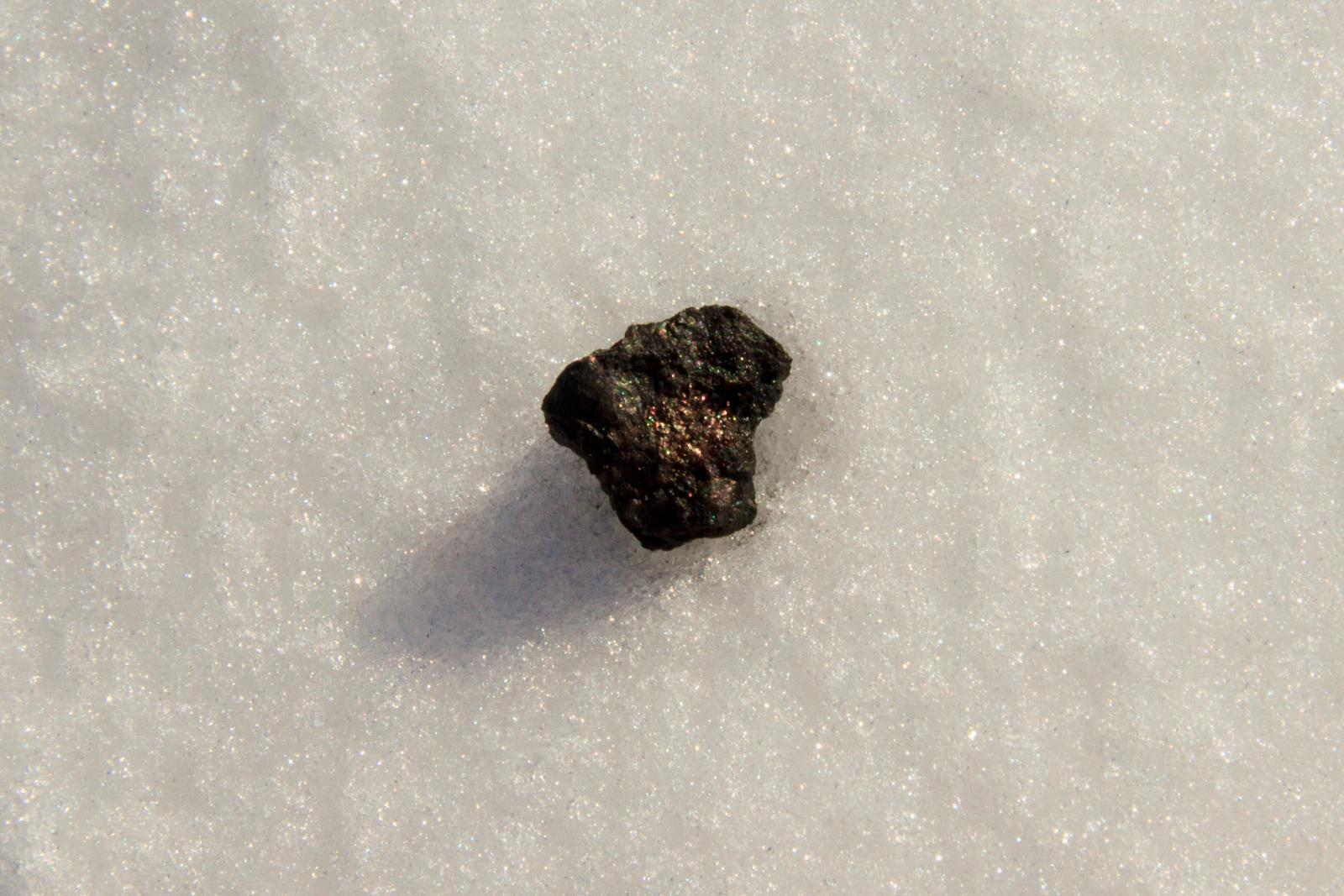
A sample found by Ural Federal University scientists at Lake Chebarkul. The object is part of the Chelyabinsk meteorite.

The United States space agency NASA estimated the diameter of the bolide at about 17 to 20 meters (56 to 66 feet) and has revised the mass several times from an initial 7,700 tonnes (7,600 long tons; 8,500 short tons), until reaching a final estimate of 10,000 tonnes (9,800 long tons; 11,000 short tons). The air burst's blast wave, when it hit the ground, produced a seismic wave which registered on seismographs at magnitude (mb_{Lg}) 4.2.

The Russian Geographical Society said the passing of the meteor over Chelyabinsk caused three blasts of different energy. The first explosion was the most powerful, and was preceded by a bright flash, which lasted about five seconds. Initial newspaper altitude estimates ranged from 30 to 70 kilometres (18.6 to 43.5 mi), with an explosive equivalent, according to NASA, of roughly 500 kilotonnes of TNT (2,100 TJ), although there is some debate on this yield (500 kilotonnes is exactly the same energy released by the Ivy King nuclear explosion in 1952). According to a paper in 2013, all these 500-kiloton yield estimates for the meteor airburst are "uncertain by a factor of two because of a lack of calibration data at those high energies and altitudes". Because of this, some studies have suggested the explosion to have been as powerful as 57 megatonnes of TNT (240 PJ), which would mean a more powerful explosion than Tunguska and comparable to the Tsar Bomba.

The hypocentre of the explosion was to the south of Chelyabinsk, in Yemanzhelinsk and Yuzhnouralsk. Due to the height of the air burst, the atmosphere absorbed most of the explosion's energy. The explosion's blast wave first reached Chelyabinsk and environs between less than 2 minutes 23 seconds and 2 minutes 57 seconds later. The object did not release all of its kinetic energy in the form of a blast wave, as some 90 kilotonnes of TNT (380 TJ) of the total energy of the main airburst's fireball was emitted as visible light according to NASA's Jet Propulsion Laboratory, and two main fragments survived the primary airburst disruption at 29.7 kilometres (18.5 miles); they flared around 24 kilometres (14.9 miles), with one falling apart at 18.5 kilometres (11.5 miles) and the other remaining luminous down to 13.6 kilometres (8.5 miles; 45,000 feet), with part of the meteoroid continuing on its general trajectory to punch a hole in the frozen Lake Chebarkul, an impact that was fortuitously captured on camera and released in November 2013.

This visualization shows the aftermath observations by NASA satellites and computer models projections of the plume and meteor debris trajectory around the atmosphere. The plume rose to an altitude of 35 km and once there, it was rapidly blown around the globe by the polar night jet.

The infrasound waves given off by the explosions were detected by 20 monitoring stations designed to detect nuclear weapons testing managed by the Comprehensive Test Ban Treaty Organization (CTBTO) Preparatory Commission, including the distant Antarctic station, some 15,000 kilometres (9,300 mi) away. The blast of the explosion was large enough to generate infrasound returns, after circling the globe, at distances as far as about 85,000 kilometres (53,000 mi). Multiple arrivals involving waves that travelled twice around the globe have been identified. The meteor explosion produced the largest infrasounds to be recorded by the CTBTO infrasound monitoring system up to that point since recording began in 2001 (only since surpassed by the 2022 Hunga Tonga–Hunga Haʻapai eruption and tsunami), so great that they reverberated around the world several times, taking more than a day to dissipate. Additional scientific analysis of US military infrasound data was aided by an agreement reached with US authorities to allow its use by civilian scientists, implemented only about a month before the Chelyabinsk meteor event.

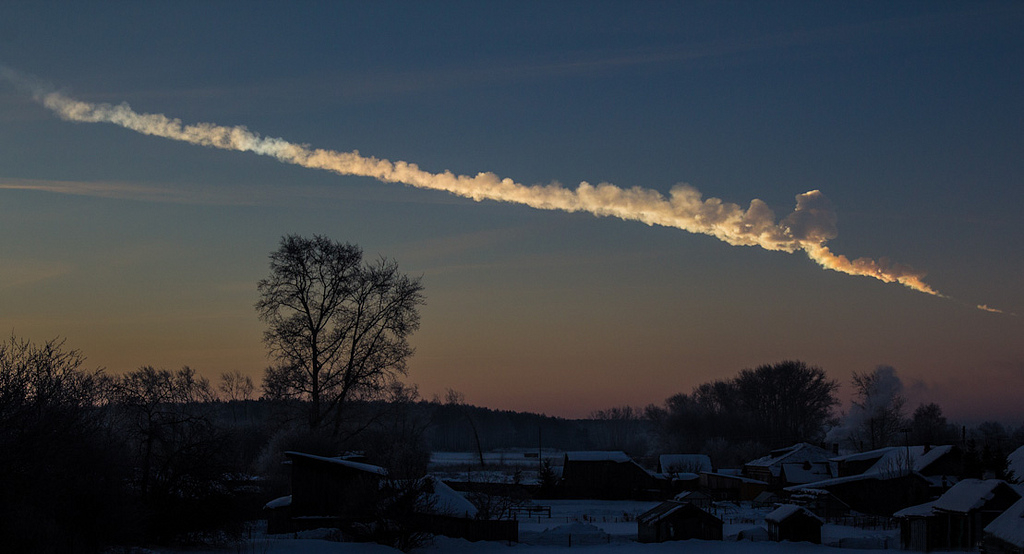
A full view of the smoke trail with the bulbous section corresponding to a mushroom cloud's cap.

A preliminary estimate of the explosive energy by astronomer Boris Shustov, director of the Russian Academy of Sciences Institute of Astronomy, was 200 kilotonnes of TNT (840 TJ), another using empirical period-yield scaling relations and the infrasound records, by Peter Brown of the University of Western Ontario gave a value of 460–470 kilotonnes of TNT (1,900–2,000 TJ) and represents a best estimate for the yield of this airburst; there remains a potential "uncertainty [in the order of] a factor of two in this yield value". Brown and his colleagues also went on to publish a paper in November 2013 which stated that the "widely referenced technique of estimating airburst damage does not reproduce the [Chelyabinsk] observations, and that the mathematical relations found in the book The Effects of Nuclear Weapons which are based on the effects of nuclear weapons – [which is] almost always used with this technique – overestimate blast damage [when applied to meteor airbursts]". A similar overestimate of the explosive yield of the Tunguska airburst also exists; as incoming celestial objects have rapid directional motion, the object causes stronger blast wave and thermal radiation pulses at the ground surface than would be predicted by a stationary object exploding, limited to the height at which the blast was initiated-where the object's "momentum is ignored". Thus, a meteor airburst of a given energy is "much more damaging than an equivalent [energy] nuclear explosion at the same altitude". The seismic wave produced when the primary airburst's blast struck the ground yields a rather uncertain "best estimate" of 430 kilotons (momentum ignored).

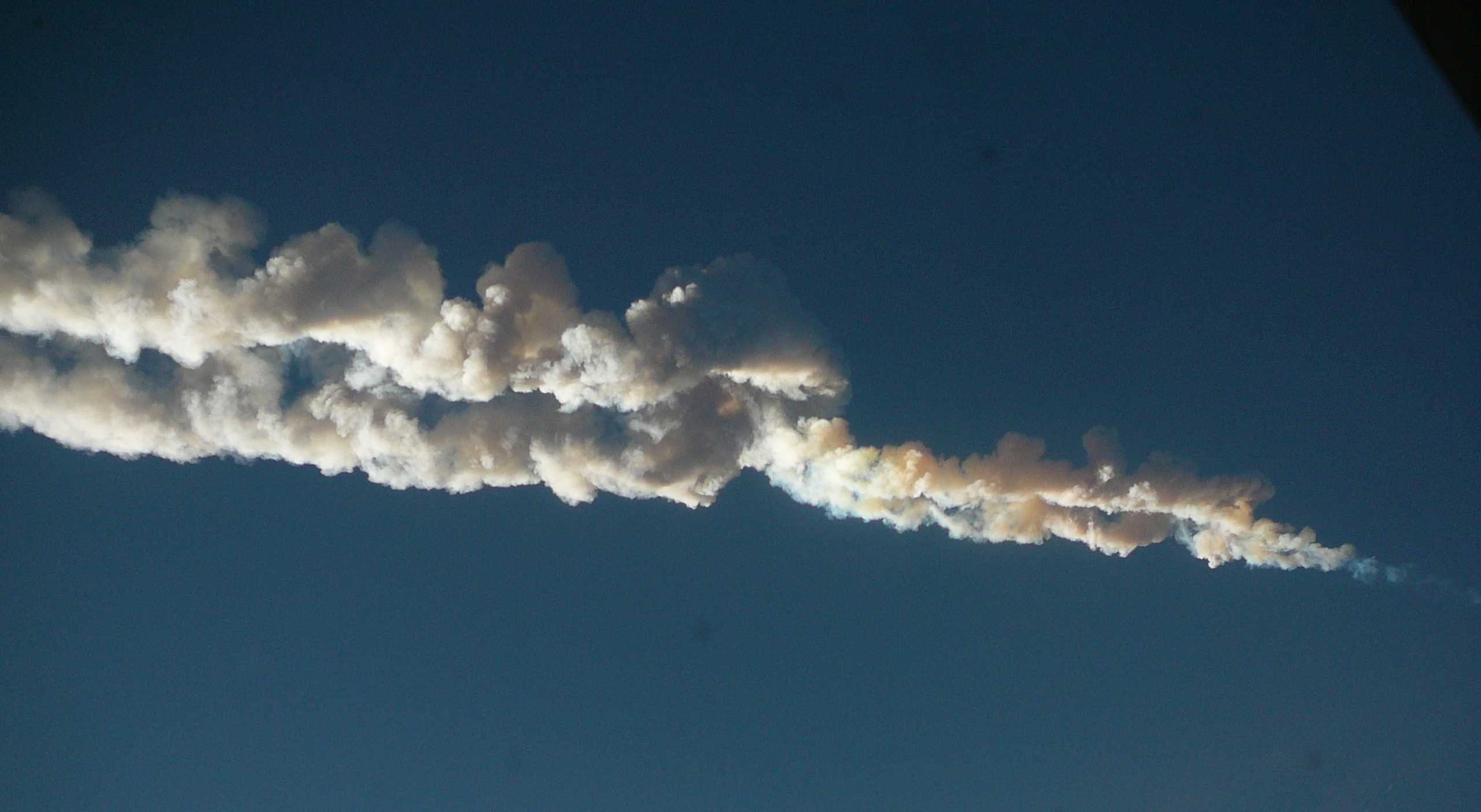
A picture taken of the smoke trail with the double plumes visible either side of the bulbous "mushroom cloud" cap.

Brown also states that the double smoke plume formation, as seen in photographs, is believed to have coincided near the primary airburst section of the dust trail (as also pictured following the Tagish Lake fireball), and it likely indicates where rising air quickly flowed into the center of the trail, essentially in the same manner as a moving 3D version of a mushroom cloud. Photographs of this smoke trail portion, before it split into two plumes, show this cigar-shaped region glowing incandescently for a few seconds. This region is the area in which the maximum of material ablation occurred, with the double plume persisting for a time and then appearing to rejoin or close up.

== Injuries and damage ==
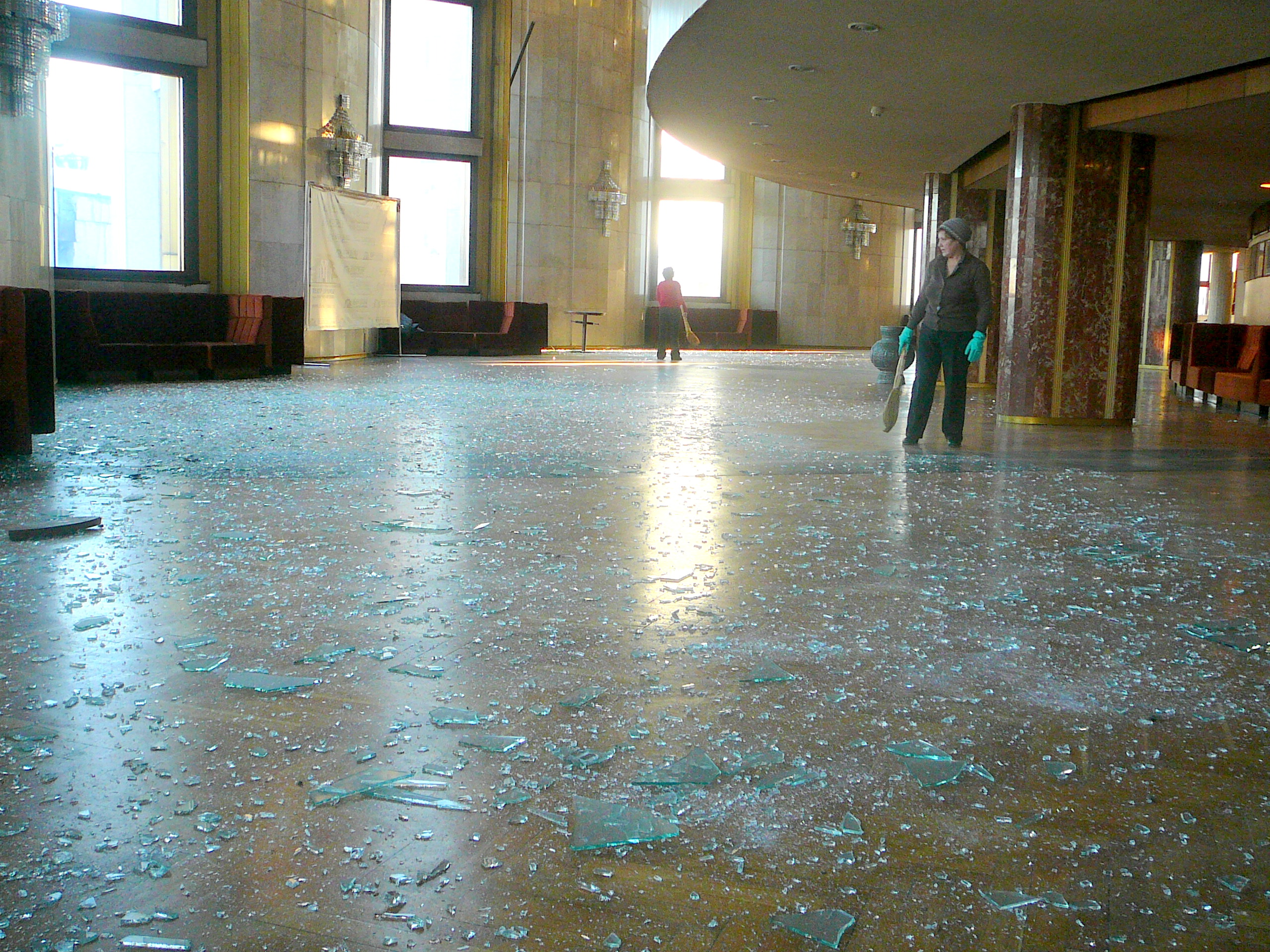
Shattered windows in the foyer of the Chelyabinsk Drama Theatre.

The blast created by the meteor's air burst produced extensive ground damage throughout an irregular elliptical area around a hundred kilometres wide, and a few tens of kilometres long, with the secondary effects of the blast being the main cause of the considerable number of injuries. Russian authorities stated that 1,491 people sought medical attention in Chelyabinsk Oblast within the first few days. Health officials reported 112 hospitalisations, including two in serious condition. A 52-year-old woman with a broken spine was flown to Moscow for treatment. Most of the injuries were caused by the secondary blast effects of glass which shattered and fell inward. The intense light from the meteor, momentarily brighter than the Sun, also produced injuries, resulting in more than 180 cases of eye pain, and 70 people subsequently reported temporary flash blindness. Twenty people reported ultraviolet burns similar to sunburn, possibly intensified by the presence of snow on the ground. Vladimir Petrov, when meeting with scientists to assess the damage, reported that he sustained so much sunburn from the meteor that the skin flaked only days later.

A fourth-grade teacher in Chelyabinsk, Yulia Karbysheva, was hailed as a hero after saving 44 children from imploding window glass cuts. Despite not knowing the origin of the intense flash of light, Karbysheva thought it prudent to take precautionary measures by ordering her students to stay away from the room's windows and to perform a duck and cover manoeuvre and then to leave the building. Karbysheva, who remained standing, was seriously lacerated when the blast arrived and window glass severed a tendon in one of her arms and left thigh; none of her students, whom she ordered to hide under their desks, suffered cuts. The teacher was taken to a hospital which received 112 people that day. The majority of the patients were suffering from cuts.

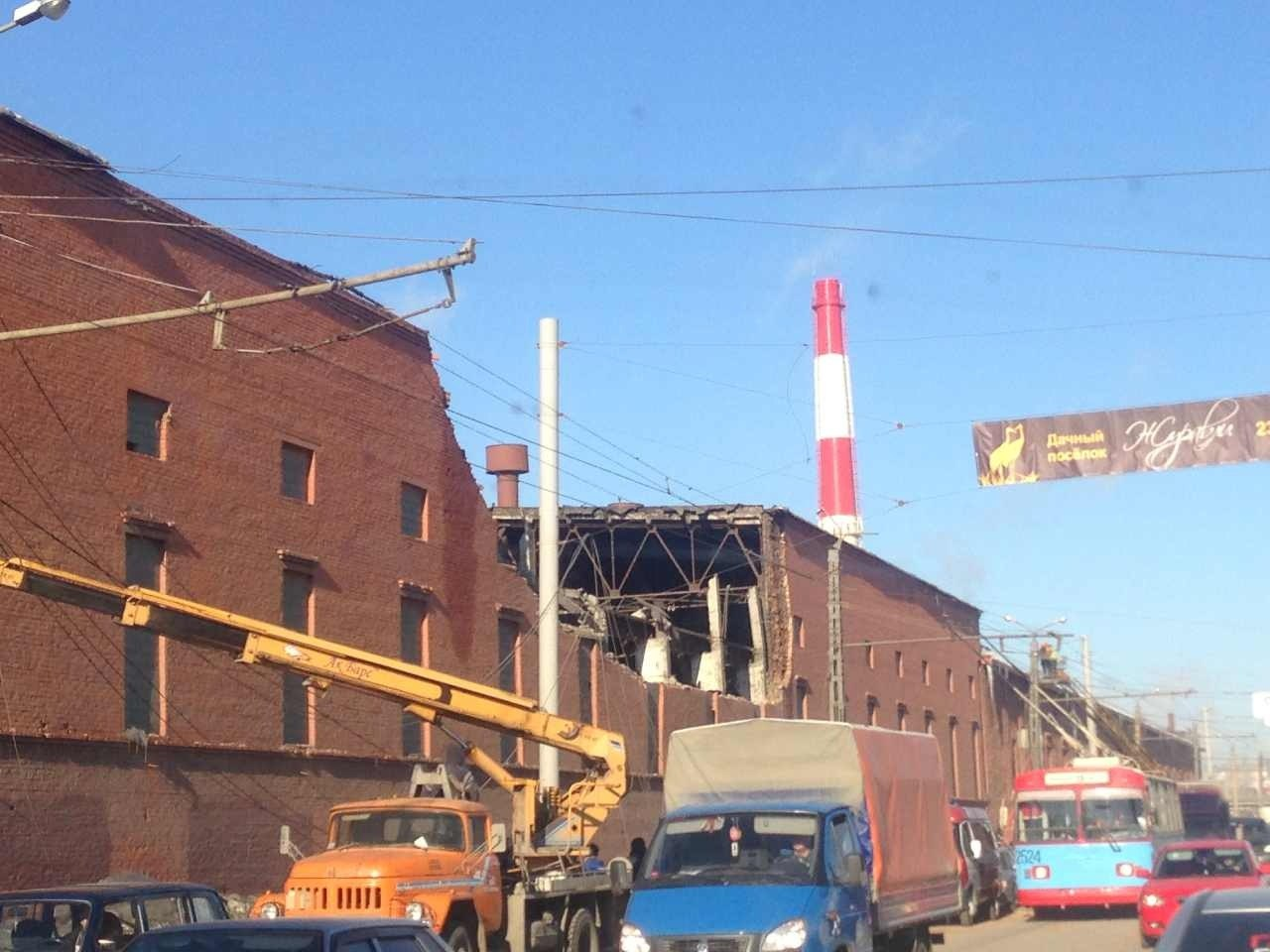
The collapsed roof over the warehouse section of a zinc factory in Chelyabinsk.

After the air blast, car alarms went off and mobile phone networks were overloaded with calls. Office buildings in Chelyabinsk were evacuated. Classes for all Chelyabinsk schools were cancelled, mainly due to broken windows. At least 20 children were injured when the windows of a school and kindergarten were blown in at 09:22. After the event, government officials in Chelyabinsk asked parents to take their children home from schools.

Approximately 600 m^{2} (6,500 sq ft) of a roof at a zinc factory collapsed during the incident. Residents in Chelyabinsk whose windows were smashed quickly sought to cover the openings with anything available, to protect themselves against temperatures of −15 °C (5 °F). Approximately 100,000 home-owners were affected, according to Chelyabinsk Oblast Governor Mikhail Yurevich. He also said that preserving the water pipes of the city's district heating was the primary goal of the authorities as they scrambled to contain further post-explosion damage.

By 5 March 2013, the number of damaged buildings was tallied at more than 7,200, which included some 6,040 apartment blocks, 293 medical facilities, 718 schools and universities, 100 cultural organizations, and 43 sport facilities, of which only about 1.5% had not yet been repaired. The oblast governor estimated the damage to buildings at more than US$33 million. Chelyabinsk authorities said that broken windows of apartment homes, but not the glazing of enclosed balconies, would be replaced at the state's expense. One of the buildings damaged in the blast was the Traktor Ice Arena, home arena of Traktor Chelyabinsk of the Kontinental Hockey League (KHL). The arena was closed for inspection, affecting various scheduled events, and possibly the postseason of the KHL.

The irregular elliptical shape of the airburst's blast-damage area resembled "the form of a butterfly" facing in the direction of the meteor's motion. That characteristic shape was also observed in the larger airburst event at Tunguska in 1908.

== Reactions ==
The Chelyabinsk meteor struck without warning. Dmitry Medvedev, the Prime Minister of Russia, confirmed a meteor had struck Russia and said it proved that the entire planet is vulnerable to meteors and a spaceguard system is needed to protect the planet from similar objects in the future. Dmitry Rogozin, the deputy prime minister, proposed that there should be an international program that would alert countries to "objects of an extraterrestrial origin", also called potentially hazardous objects.

Colonel General Nikolay Bogdanov, commander of the Central Military District, created task forces that were directed to the probable impact areas to search for fragments of the asteroid and to monitor the situation. Meteorites (fragments) measuring 1 to 5 centimetres (3/8 to 2 inches) were found 1 km (3,300 ft) from Chebarkul in the Chelyabinsk region.

On the day of the impact, Bloomberg News reported that the United Nations Office for Outer Space Affairs had suggested the investigation of creating an "Action Team on Near-Earth Objects", a proposed global asteroid warning network system, due to Duende's approach. As a result of the impact, two scientists in California proposed directed-energy weapon technology development as a possible means to protect Earth from asteroids. Furthermore, the NEOWISE satellite was brought out of hibernation for its second mission extension to scan for near-earth objects. Later in 2013, NASA began annual asteroid impact simulation testing.

== Frequency ==
Comparison of approximate sizes of notable impactors with the Hoba meteorite, a Boeing 747 and a New Routemaster bus

It is estimated that the frequency of airbursts from objects 20 metres (66 ft) across is about once in every 60 years. There have been incidents in the previous century involving a comparable energy yield or higher: the 1908 Tunguska event, and, in 1963, off the coast of the Prince Edward Islands in the Indian Ocean. Two of those were over unpopulated areas; however, the 1963 event may not have been a meteor.

Centuries before, the 1490 Qingyang event, of an unknown magnitude, apparently caused 10,000 deaths. While modern researchers are skeptical about the 10,000 deaths figure, the 1908 Tunguska event would have been devastating over a highly populous district.

== Origin ==
Based on its entry direction and speed of 19 kilometres per second (12 mi/s), the Chelyabinsk meteor apparently originated in the asteroid belt between Mars and Jupiter. It was probably an asteroid fragment. The meteorite has veins of black material which had experienced high-pressure shock, and were once partly melted due to a previous collision. The metamorphism in the chondrules in the meteorite samples indicates the rock comprising the meteor had a history of collisions and was once several kilometres below the surface of a much larger LL chondrite asteroid. The Chelyabinsk asteroid probably entered an orbital resonance with Jupiter (a common way for material to be ejected from the asteroid belt) which increased its orbital eccentricity until its perihelion was reduced enough for it to be able to collide with the Earth.

== Meteorites ==
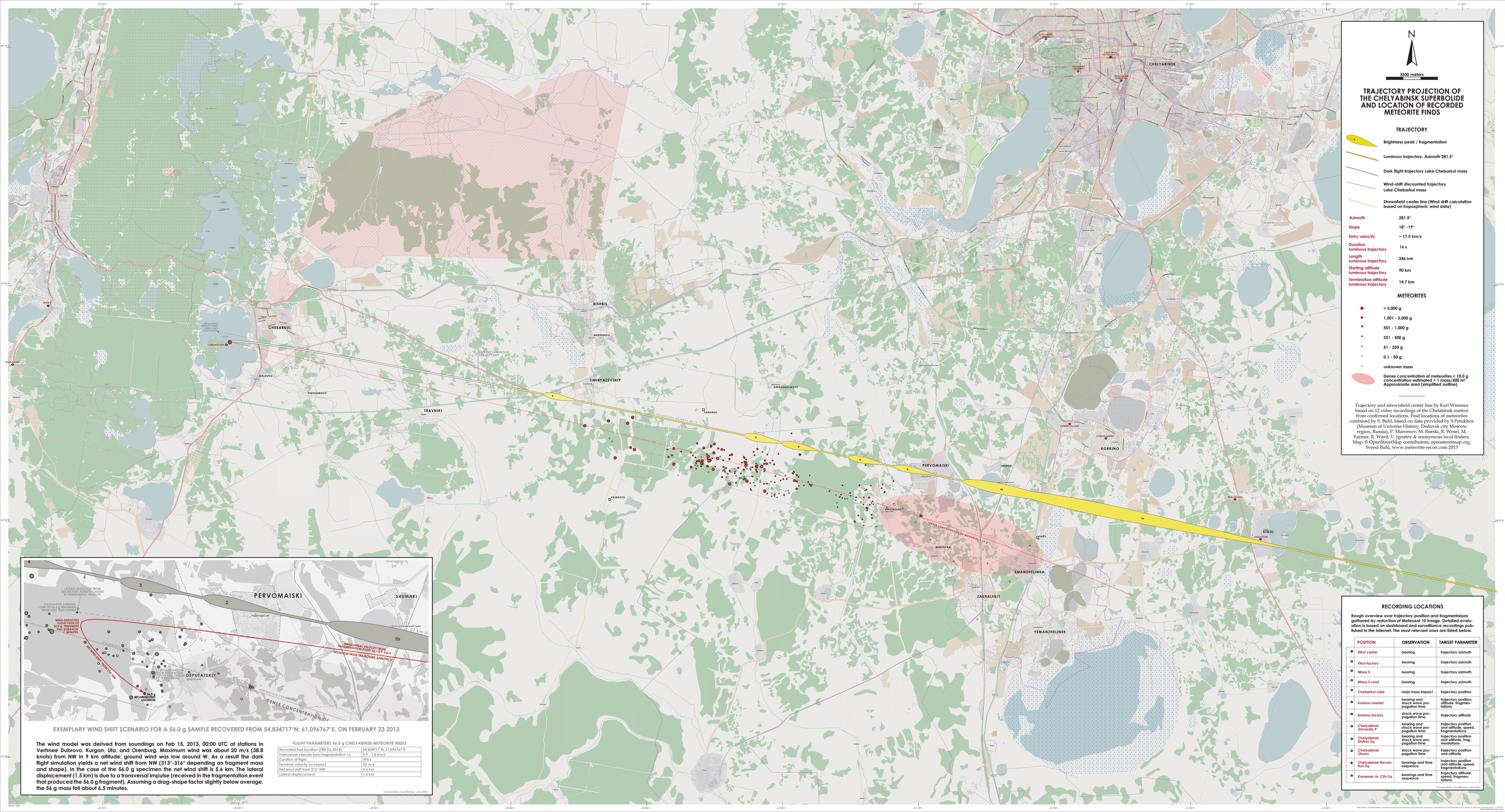
Strewnfield map of recovered meteorites (253 documented find locations, status of 18 July 2013).

In the aftermath of the air burst of the body, many small meteorites fell on areas west of Chelyabinsk, generally at terminal velocity, about the speed of a piece of gravel dropped from a skyscraper. Analysis of the meteor showed that all resulted from the main breakup at 27–34 kilometers (16.8–21.1 mi) altitude. Local residents and schoolchildren located and picked up some of the meteorites, many located in snowdrifts, by following a visible hole that had been left in the outer surface of the snow. Speculators were active in the informal market that emerged for meteorite fragments.

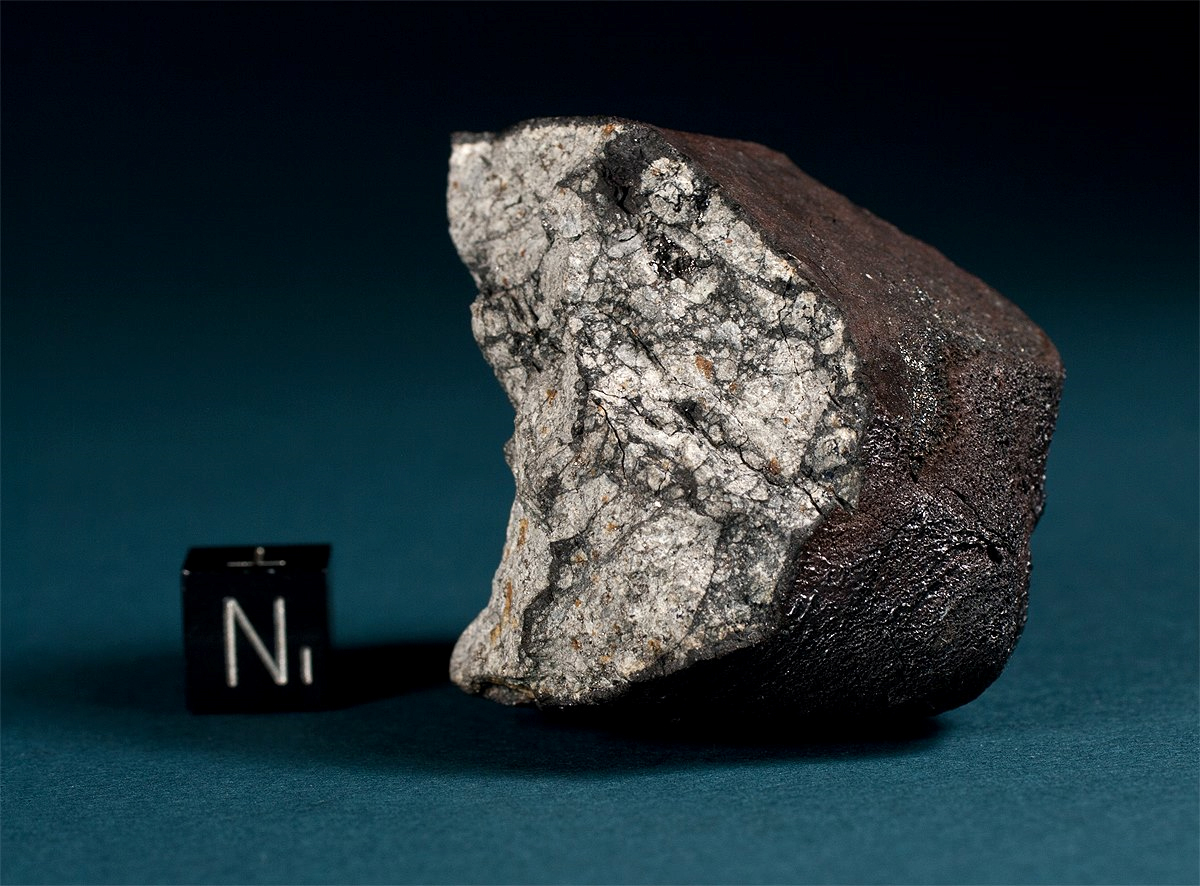
A 112.2 grams (3.96 oz) Chelyabinsk meteorite specimen, one of many found within days of the airburst, this one between the villages of Deputatsky and Emanzhelinsk. The broken fragment displays a thick primary fusion crust with flow lines and a heavily shocked matrix with melt veins and planar fractures. Scale cube is 1 cm (3/8 in).

In the hours after the visual meteor sighting, a 6-meter (20-foot) wide hole was discovered on Lake Chebarkul's frozen surface. It was not immediately clear whether this was the result of an impact; scientists from the Ural Federal University collected 53 samples from around the hole the same day it was discovered. The early specimens recovered were all less than 1 centimetre (3/8 in) in size and initial laboratory analysis confirmed their meteoric origin. They are ordinary chondrite meteorites and contain 10 per cent iron. The fall is officially designated as the Chelyabinsk meteorite. The Chelyabinsk meteor was later determined to come from the LL chondrite group. The meteorites were LL5 chondrites having a shock stage of S4, and had a variable appearance between light and dark types. Petrographic changes during the fall allowed estimates that the body was heated between 65–135 °C (149–275 °F) degrees during its atmospheric entry.

In June 2013, Russian scientists reported that further investigation by magnetic imaging below the location of the ice hole in Lake Chebarkul had identified a 60 cm (2 ft) meteorite buried in the mud at the bottom of the lake. Before recovery began, the chunk was estimated to weigh roughly 300 kilograms (660 lb).

After an operation lasting a number of weeks, it was raised from the bottom of the Chebarkul lake on 16 October 2013. With a total mass of 654 kg (1,442 lb), this is the largest found fragment of the Chelyabinsk meteorite. Initially, it tipped and broke the scales used to weigh it, splitting into three pieces.

In November 2013, a video from a security camera was released showing the impact of the fragment at the Chebarkul lake. This is the first impact of a meteorite recorded on video. From the measured time difference between the shadow generating meteor to the moment of impact, scientists calculated that this meteorite hit the ice at about 225 m/s (810 km/h; 503 mph), 64% of the speed of sound.

== Media coverage ==
External videos
- Meteor air burst Explosions, Shock
- Two videos, first from a car and from street on YouTube
- Extensive dashcam footage from the atmospheric entry onwards on YouTube
- Explosion eyewitness on YouTube
- Bright light and sound recorded by a stationary surveillance camera on YouTube
- Video of meteor explosion that stirred panic in Urals region

The Russian government put out a brief statement within an hour of the event. The news in English was first reported by the hockey site Russian Machine Never Breaks before heavy coverage by the international media and the Associated Press ensued, with the Russian government's confirmation less than two hours afterwards. Less than 15 hours after the meteor impact, videos of the meteor and its aftermath had been viewed millions of times.

The number of injuries caused by the asteroid led the Internet-search giant Google to remove a Google Doodle from their website, created for the predicted pending arrival of another asteroid, 2012 DA14. New York City planetarium director Neil deGrasse Tyson stated the Chelyabinsk meteor was unpredicted because no attempt had been made to find and catalogue every 15 meter (50 feet) near-Earth object. Doing so would be very difficult, and current efforts only aim at a complete inventory of 150 m (490 ft) near-Earth objects. The Asteroid Terrestrial-impact Last Alert System, on the other hand, could now predict some Chelyabinsk-like events a day or so in advance, if and only if their radiant is not close to the Sun.

On 27 March 2013, a broadcast episode of the science television series Nova titled "Meteor Strike" documented the Chelyabinsk meteor, including the significant contribution to meteoritic science made by the numerous videos of the airburst posted online by ordinary citizens. The Nova program called the video documentation and the related scientific discoveries of the airburst "unprecedented". The documentary also discussed the much greater tragedy "that could have been" if the asteroid entered the Earth's atmosphere more steeply.

== Impactor orbital parameters ==
Preliminary orbital solutions for impacting asteroid
Source	Q	q	a	e	i	Ω	ω
Source	AU				(°)		
Popova, Jenniskens, Emelʹyanenko et al.; Science	2.78 ±0.20	0.74 ±0.02	1.76 ±0.16	0.58 ±0.02	4.93 ±0.48°	326.442 ±0.003°	108.3 ±3.8°
Lyytinen via Hankey; AMS	2.53	0.80	1.66	0.52	4.05°	326.43°	116.0°
Zuluaga, Ferrin; arXiv	2.64	0.82	1.73	0.51	3.45°	326.70°	120.6°
Borovicka, et al.; IAU	2.33	0.77	1.55	0.50	3.6°	326.41°	109.7°
Zuluaga, Ferrin, Geens; arXiv	1.816	0.716	1.26 ± 0.05	0.44 ± 0.03	2.984°	326.5° ± 0.3°	95.5° ± 2°
Chodas, Chesley; JPL via Sky and Telescope	2.78	0.75	1.73	0.57	4.2°		
Insan			1.5	0.5	3°		
Proud; GRL	2.23	0.71	1.47	0.52	4.61°	326.53°	96.58°
de la Fuente Marcos; MNRAS: Letters	2.48	0.76	1.62	0.53	3.97°	326.45°	109.71°

Q = aphelion, q = perihelion, a = semi-major axis, e = eccentricity, i = inclination,
Ω = ascending node longitude, ω = argument of perihelion

Videos of the Chelyabinsk superbolide, particularly from the dashboard cameras and traffic cameras which are ubiquitous in Russia, helped to establish the meteor's provenance as an Apollo asteroid. Sophisticated analysis techniques included the subsequent superposition of nighttime starfield views over recorded daytime images from the same cameras, as well as the plotting of the daytime shadow vectors shown in several online videos.

The radiant of the impacting asteroid was located in the constellation Pegasus in the Northern Hemisphere. The radiant was close to the Eastern horizon where the Sun was starting to rise.

The asteroid belonged to the Apollo group of near-Earth asteroids, and was roughly 40 days past perihelion (closest approach to the Sun) and had aphelion (furthest distance from the Sun) in the asteroid belt. Several groups independently derived similar orbits for the object, but with sufficient variance to point to different potential parent bodies of this meteoroid. The Apollo asteroid 2011 EO40 is one of the candidates proposed for the role of the parent body of the Chelyabinsk superbolide. Other published orbits are similar to the 2-kilometre-diameter asteroid (86039) 1999 NC43 to suggest they had once been part of the same object; they may not be able to reproduce the timing of the impact.

== Coincidental asteroid approach ==
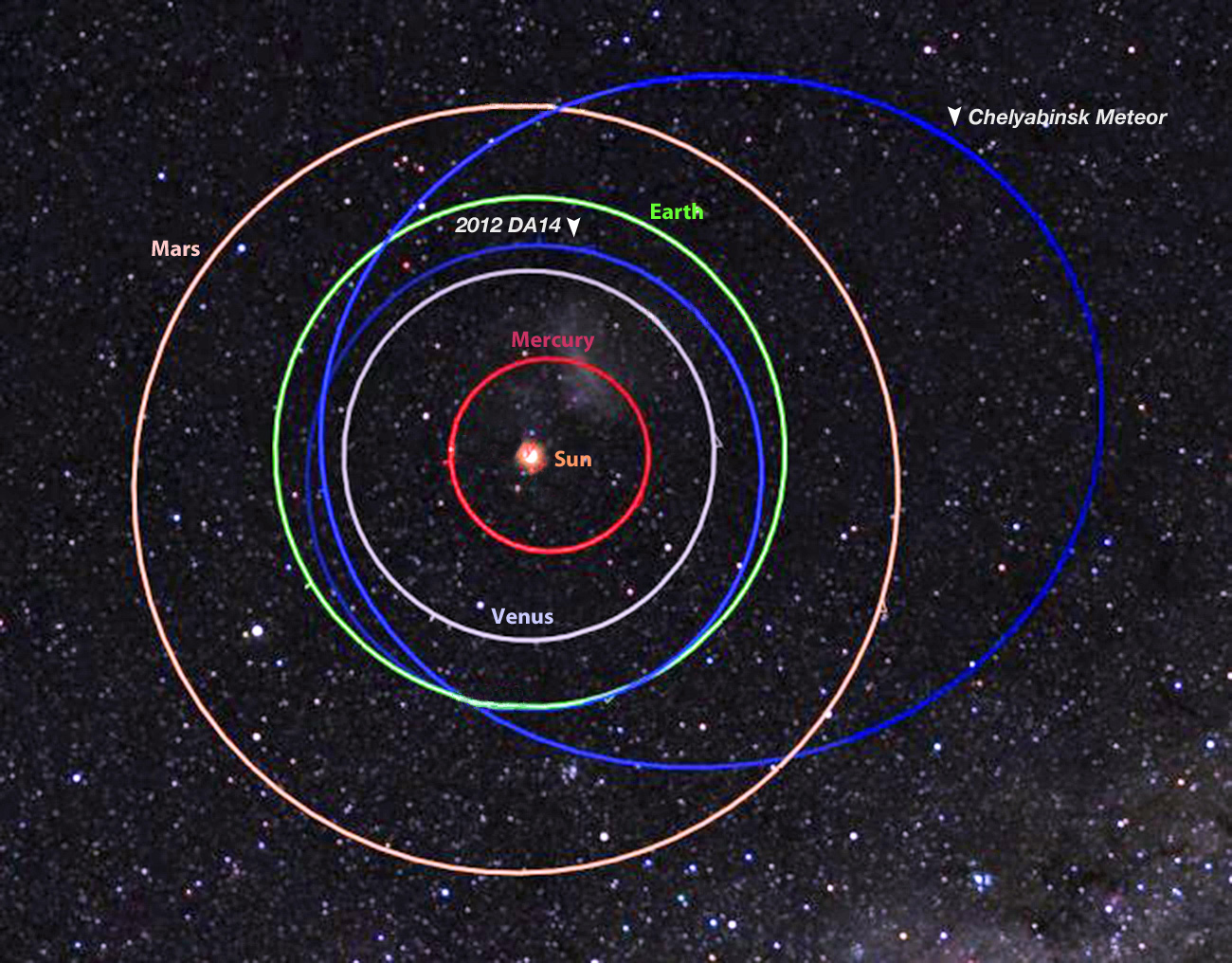
Comparison of the former orbit of the Chelyabinsk meteor (larger elliptical blue orbit) and asteroid 2012 DA_{14} (smaller circular blue orbit), showing that they are dissimilar.

Preliminary calculations rapidly showed that the object was unrelated to the long-predicted close approach of the asteroid 367943 Duende, that flew by Earth 16 hours later at a distance of 27,700 km (17,200 mi). The Sodankylä Geophysical Observatory, Russian sources, the European Space Agency, NASA and the Royal Astronomical Society all concluded that the two asteroids had widely different trajectories and therefore could not have been related.

== See also ==
- Asteroid impact avoidance
- List of meteor air bursts

Comparing the Tunguska (1), Chelyabinsk (2) and Kamchatka (3) events' locations
