= 2015 NHL Winter Classic =

Outdoor National Hockey League game in Washington, D.C.

| | 1 | 2 | 3 | Total |
|---|---|---|---|---|
| Chicago Blackhawks | 1 | 1 | 0 | 2 |
| Washington Capitals | 2 | 0 | 1 | 3 |
- Date: January 1, 2015
- Venue: Nationals Park
- City: Washington, D.C.
- Attendance: 42,832

The 2015 NHL Winter Classic was an outdoor ice hockey game played in the National Hockey League (NHL) on January 1, 2015, at Nationals Park in Washington, D.C. The seventh edition of the Winter Classic, it matched the Chicago Blackhawks against the Washington Capitals. The Capitals won, 3–2, after right winger Troy Brouwer scored the go-ahead goal with less than 13 seconds remaining in regulation play. This marked the first time in Winter Classic history that the home team won in regulation. The game garnered an attendance of 42,832, and was televised nationally in the United States on NBC and in Canada on CBC.

The 2015 Winter Classic marked the Capitals' second victory in as many outdoor games (the first being in the 2011 NHL Winter Classic), and the Blackhawks' second loss in three outdoor games (the previous two being a loss in the 2009 NHL Winter Classic and a victory in the 2014 NHL Stadium Series). The game was one of two to be held outdoors during the 2014–15 NHL season, the other being the 2015 NHL Stadium Series in February.

== Background ==
=== Site selection ===
NHL Commissioner Gary Bettman promised before the 2010 Stanley Cup Finals in Chicago that the Capitals would get to host the Winter Classic within two or three years. However, the 2013 NHL Winter Classic was postponed by a year due to the 2012–13 NHL lockout, and the Capitals therefore had to wait until at least 2015 to host the Winter Classic.

=== Stadium selection ===
The Baltimore–Washington metroplex has several stadiums that meet the NHL's criteria for hosting the Winter Classic, and speculation included RFK Stadium and Nationals Park in Washington, D.C.; FedExField in Landover, Maryland; and Oriole Park at Camden Yards in Baltimore. A desire to keep the game in the city proper and Nationals Park's more modern amenities made Nationals Park the early favorite.

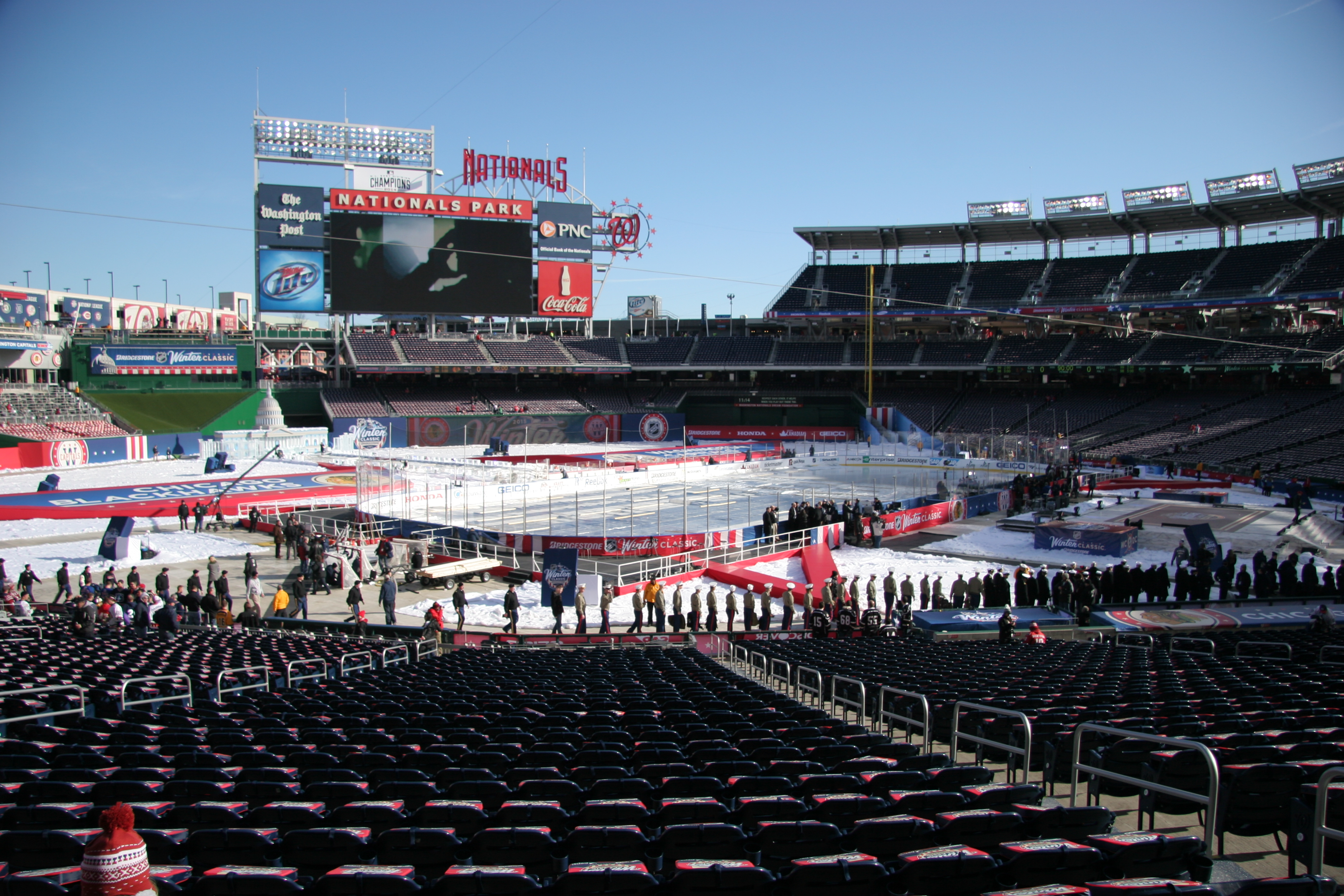
Nationals Park in hockey configuration prior to the 2015 NHL Winter Classic. Reflective tarps covered part of the ice to protect the surface from the sun.

On September 10, 2014, the NHL confirmed the game would be played at Nationals Park.

=== Opponent selection ===
On June 20, 2014, nine months after the Capitals were named as hosts, the media reported they would play the Chicago Blackhawks, although the NHL did not immediately confirm the reports until they announced the 2014–15 regular season schedule two days later. This marked the second Winter Classic appearance for both the Capitals and the Blackhawks. In the 2009 Winter Classic, the Blackhawks lost to the Detroit Red Wings 4–6. In the 2011 Winter Classic, the Capitals defeated the Pittsburgh Penguins 3–1.

== Uniforms ==
Chicago's jerseys were based on their 1957 jerseys, white with red and black striping on the bottom, lace-up collars and the tomahawk logo near the elbows. Washington's jerseys represented a combined look back at hockey in D.C.: red sweaters (in a darker shade of red than the team's normal uniforms) with white stripes atop the shoulders and along the bottom, the front featuring the team's name in white over a large blue 'W', with the center of the 'W' stylized like the Washington Monument. Images of Washington's new logo and uniforms were published by Russian Machine Never Breaks before the official unveiling by the team.

== Game summary ==
| January 1, 2015 | Chicago Blackhawks | 2–3 | Washington Capitals | Nationals Park | Recap |

The Capitals built a 2–0 lead in the first period off of goals by Eric Fehr and Alexander Ovechkin. The Blackhawks then scored goals by Patrick Sharp and Brandon Saad to tie the game in the second period. In the waning minutes of the third period with Washington on the power play, Ovechkin was slashed by Saad, and as the referee was signaling for the delayed penalty, Troy Brouwer picked up the loose puck that Ovechkin had lost and beat Corey Crawford for the game winning goal with 13 seconds left in the game.

Scoring summary
| Period | Team | Goal | Assist(s) | Time | Score |
|---|---|---|---|---|---|
| 1st | WSH | Eric Fehr (11) | Unassisted | 07:01 | 1–0 WSH |
| 1st | WSH | Alexander Ovechkin (18) | Mike Green (15) and Jack Hillen (3) | 11:58 | 2–0 WSH |
| 1st | CHI | Patrick Sharp (7) – pp | Duncan Keith (18) and Patrick Kane (23) | 13:36 | 2–1 WSH |
| 2nd | CHI | Brandon Saad (9) | Jonathan Toews (19) and Marian Hossa (17) | 03:15 | 2–2 |
| 3rd | WSH | Troy Brouwer (11) – pp | Alexander Ovechkin (14) and Mike Green (16) | 19:47 | 3–2 WSH |

Number in parentheses represents the player's total in goals or assists to that point of the season

Penalty summary
| Period | Team | Player | Penalty | Time | PIM |
|---|---|---|---|---|---|
| 1st | CHI | Daniel Carcillo | Roughing | 05:41 | 2:00 |
| 1st | WSH | Tom Wilson | Roughing | 05:41 | 2:00 |
| 1st | WSH | Nicklas Backstrom | Holding | 13:29 | 2:00 |
| 1st | CHI | Bryan Bickell | High-sticking | 17:41 | 2:00 |
| 1st | WSH | Troy Brouwer | Boarding | 18:33 | 2:00 |
| 2nd | WSH | Jason Chimera | Holding | 03:57 | 2:00 |
| 2nd | WSH | Tom Wilson | Goaltender interference | 09:18 | 2:00 |
| 2nd | WSH | John Carlson | High-sticking | 09:47 | 2:00 |
| 3rd | CHI | Andrew Shaw | Tripping | 08:21 | 2:00 |
| 3rd | WSH | Matt Niskanen | Boarding | 16:49 | 2:00 |
| 3rd | CHI | Jonathan Toews | Hooking | 18:47 | 2:00 |
| 3rd | CHI | Brandon Saad | Slashing | 19:47 | 2:00 |

Shots by period
| Team | 1 | 2 | 3 | Total |
|---|---|---|---|---|
| Chicago | 13 | 13 | 9 | 35 |
| Washington | 15 | 7 | 13 | 35 |

Power play opportunities
| Team | Goals/Opportunities |
|---|---|
| Chicago | 1/6 |
| Washington | 1/4 |

Three star selections
| | Team | Player | Statistics |
|---|---|---|---|
| 1st | WSH | Alexander Ovechkin | 1 goal, 1 assist |
| 2nd | CHI | Patrick Sharp | 1 goal |
| 3rd | WSH | Troy Brouwer | 1 goal |

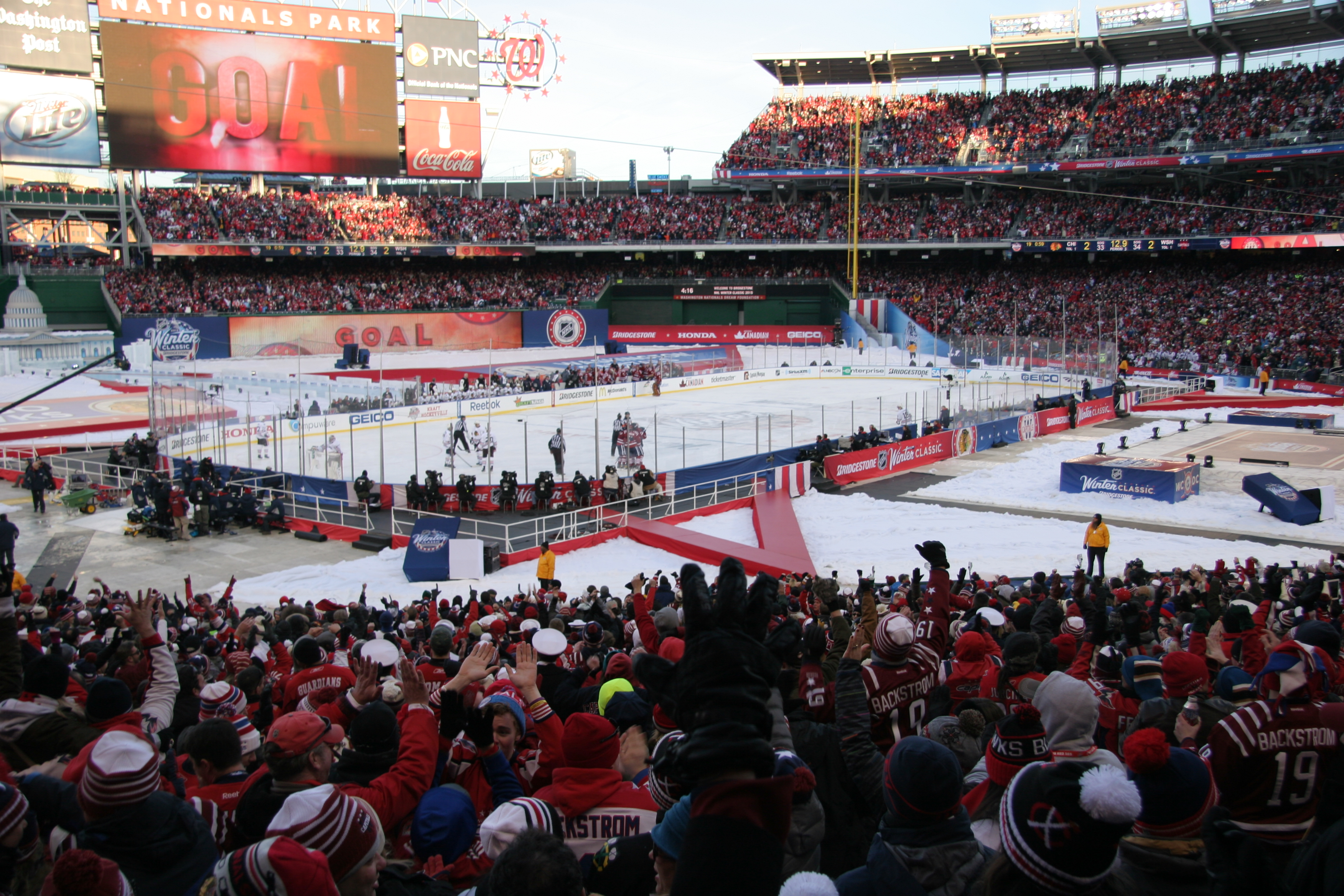
Troy Brouwer just scored the game-winning goal at the 2015 NHL Winter Classic. Capitals players and fans celebrate.

== Television ratings ==
The 2015 NHL Winter Classic was the second least watched Winter Classic to date, and was the least-watched one until 2016. NBC reported a 2.3 overnight rating and 3.47 million viewers. CBC barely crossed the 1 million viewer line.

== Pregame/Anthem/Entertainment ==
Billy Idol performed prior to the start of the game.

The national anthem was performed by the U.S. Army Chorus from the United States Army Band.

Gavin DeGraw performed during the first intermission. In the second intermission, Lee Greenwood, accompanied by the U.S. Army Chorus, performed God Bless the U.S.A.

== See also ==
- List of outdoor ice hockey games
