= Chelyabinsk meteorite =

Remains of the Chelyabinsk meteor

Chelyabinsk
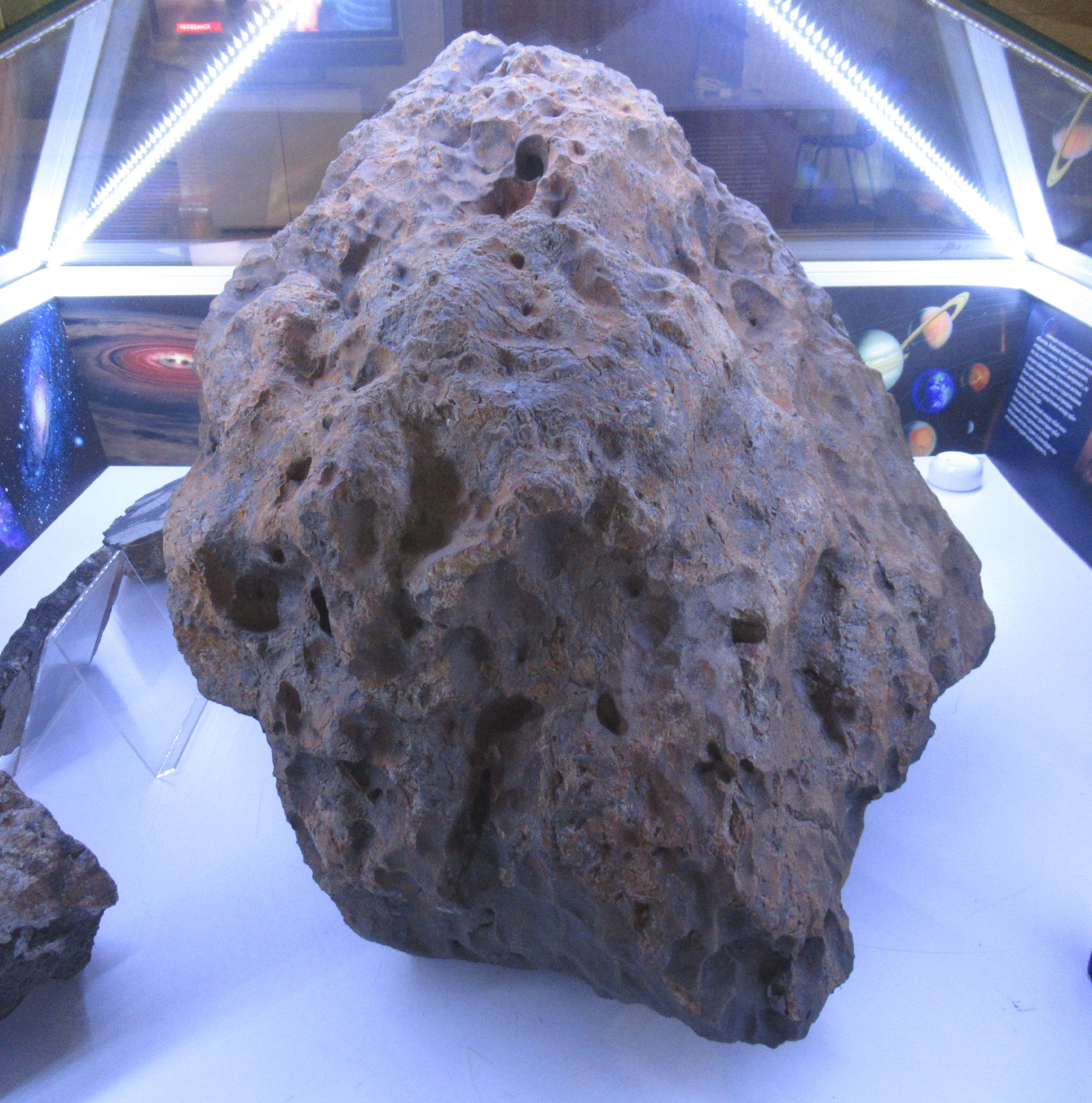
- Largest fragment of the meteorite at the exhibition of The State Museum of the South Ural History.
- Type: Ordinary chondrite LL5
- Shock stage: S4
- Weathering grade: W0 (pristine)
- Country: Russia
- Region: Chelyabinsk Oblast
- Coordinates: 54°57′18″N 60°19′30″E
- Observed fall: Yes
- Fall date: 15 February 2013, 09:20 YEKT (UTC+06:00)
- Found date: 27 February 2013
- TKW: approximately 1,000 kg (2,200 lb)
- Strewn field: Yes
- Related media on Wikimedia Commons

The Chelyabinsk meteorite (Russian: Челябинский метеорит, Chelyabinskii meteorit) is the fragmented remains of the large Chelyabinsk meteor of 15 February 2013 which reached the ground after the meteor's passage through the atmosphere. The descent of the meteor, visible as a brilliant superbolide in the morning sky, caused a series of shock waves that shattered windows, with approximately 7,200 buildings damaged, and 1,491 people injured. The resulting fragments were scattered over a wide area.

The largest fragment raised from the bottom of Lake Chebarkul on 16 October 2013 had a mass of 540 kg (1,190 lb) and the total mass of six or seven other meteorite fragments found nearby was 84.4 kg (186 lb).

== Naming ==
The meteor and meteorite are named after Chelyabinsk Oblast, over which the meteor exploded. An initial proposal was to name the meteorite after Lake Chebarkul, where one of its major fragments impacted and made a 6-metre-wide (20 ft) hole in the frozen lake surface.

== Composition and classification ==
The meteorite has been classified as an LL5 ordinary chondrite. First estimates of its composition indicate about 10% of meteoric iron, as well as olivine and sulfides.

== Asteroid ==
The impacting asteroid started to brighten up in the general direction of the constellation Pegasus, close to the East horizon where the Sun was starting to rise. The impactor belonged to the Apollo group of near-Earth asteroids.

The asteroid had an approximate size of 18 m (59 ft) and a mass of about 9,100 t (10,000 short tons) before it entered the denser parts of Earth's atmosphere and started to ablate. At an altitude of about 23.3 km (14.5 miles) the body exploded in a meteor air burst. Meteorite fragments of the body landed on the ground.

Analysis of three fragments using optical microscopy, electron microscopy, Raman spectroscopy, and isotopic composition techniques used to date Solar System objects, showed the isotopic clocks in the asteroids (rubidium and strontium ratios, argon isotope ratios) appear to have partially or totally reset in past collisions. The isotopic clock resets may result from thermal effects changing isotopic ratios, and changes due to cosmic radiation exposure. The asteroid appears to have had eight major collisions, around 4.53, 4.45, 3.73, 2.81, and 1.46 billion years ago, then at 852, 312, and 27 million years ago.

== Meteorite ==
Scientists collected 53 samples from near a 6-metre-wide (20 ft) hole in the ice of Lake Chebarkul, thought to be the result of a single meteorite fragment impact. The specimens are of various sizes, with the largest being 5 kg (11 lb), and initial laboratory analysis confirmed their meteoric origin.

In June 2013, Russian scientists reported that further investigation by magnetic imaging below the location of the ice hole in Lake Chebarkul had identified a 60 cm (2 ft) meteorite buried in the mud at the bottom of the lake. An operation to recover it from the lake began on 10 September 2013, and concluded on 16 October 2013, with the raising of the rock with the mass of 540 kg (1,190 lb). It was examined by scientists and handed over to the local authorities, who put it on display at the Chelyabinsk State Museum of Local Lore.

In the aftermath of the superbolide air burst, a large number of small meteorite fragments fell on areas west of Chelyabinsk, including Deputatskoye, generally at terminal velocity, about the speed of a piece of gravel dropped from a skyscraper. Local residents and schoolchildren located and picked up some of the meteorites, many located in snowdrifts, by following a visible hole that had been left in the outer surface of the snow. Speculators became active in the informal market for meteorite fragments that rapidly emerged.

== Popular culture ==
- As of 18 February 2013, some reports surfaced of people trying to sell fake meteorites on the Internet.
- On 15 February 2014 (the first anniversary of the event), during the 2014 Winter Olympics, winners received medals with embedded fragments of the meteorite.
- Andrey Breyvichko claimed to have founded a "Church of the Chelyabinsk Meteorite" in the Russian city of Chelyabinsk. Breyvichko opposes the operation to expose the meteorite fragment in a museum, claiming that only "psychic priests" of his church are qualified to decode and handle the celestial body, which they want to be placed in a temple to be built in Chelyabinsk for the purpose.

== Gallery ==
Size comparison of the meteoroid to a Boeing 747, among some other objects

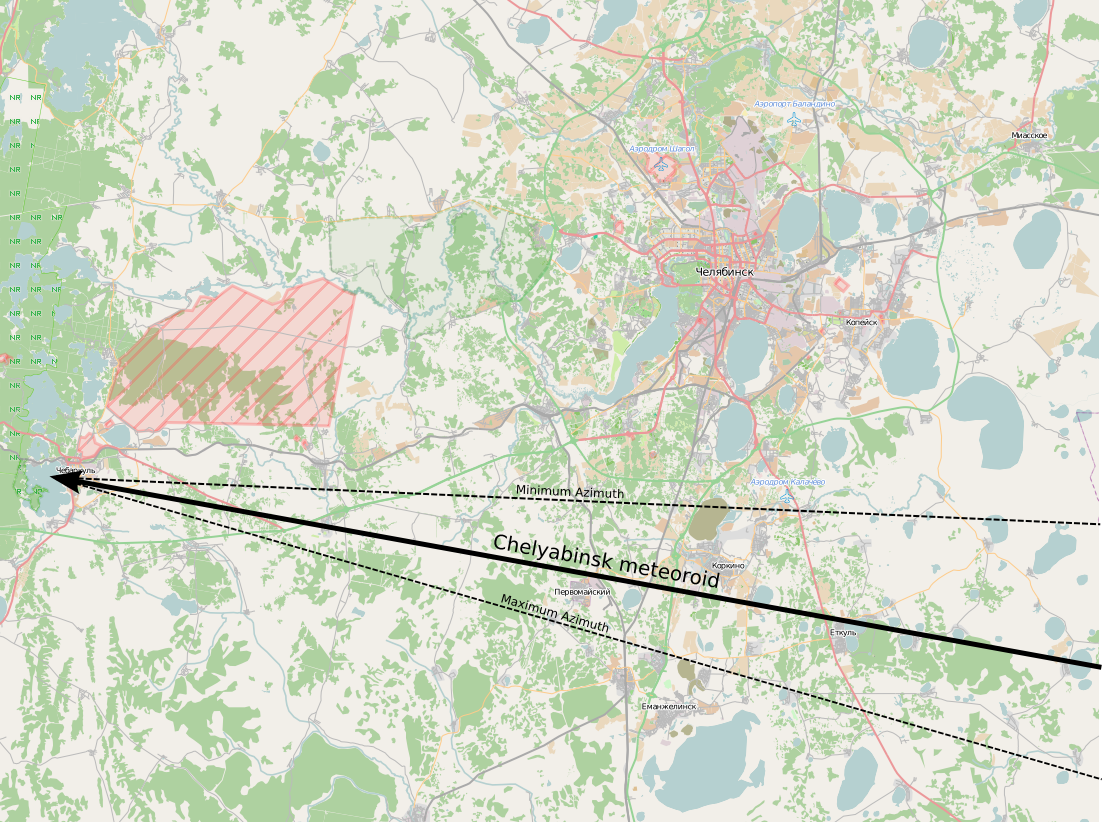
The meteor's path relative to ground

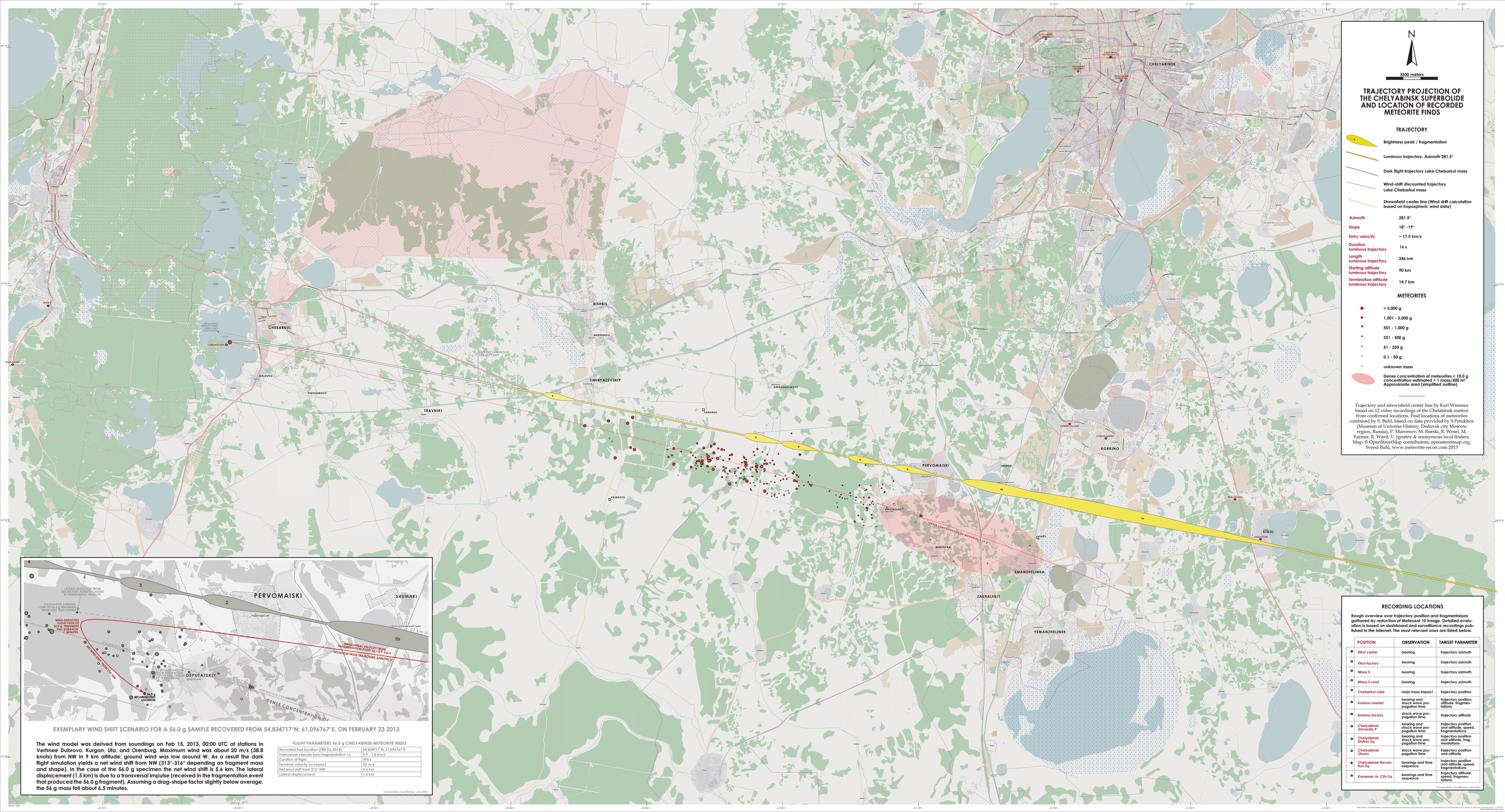
Trajectory projection of Chelyabinsk meteor and strewnfield map of 253 recovered meteorites, of which 199 were weighed and documented (status of 18 Jul 2013).

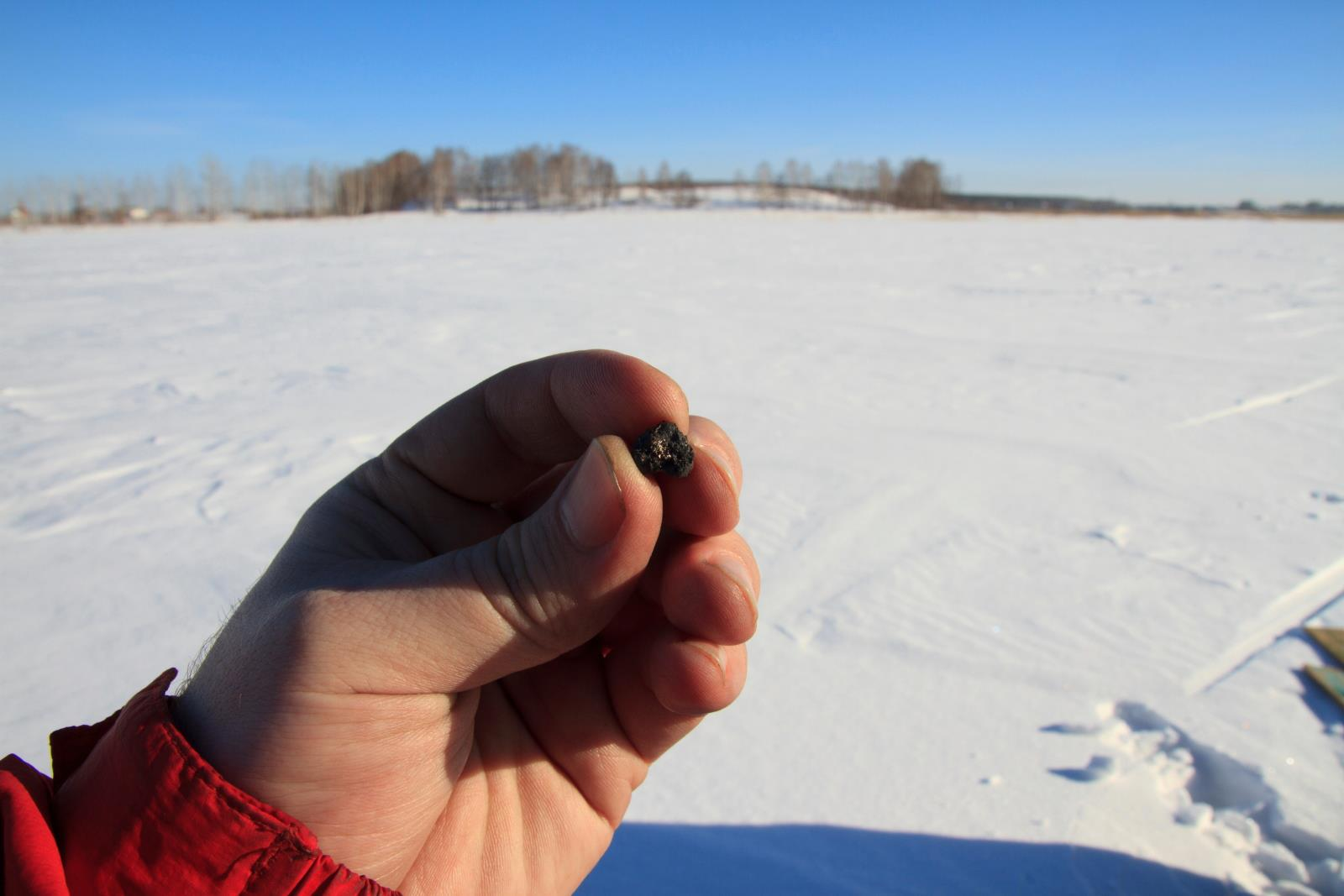
Researcher holds a sample found at Chebarkul lake

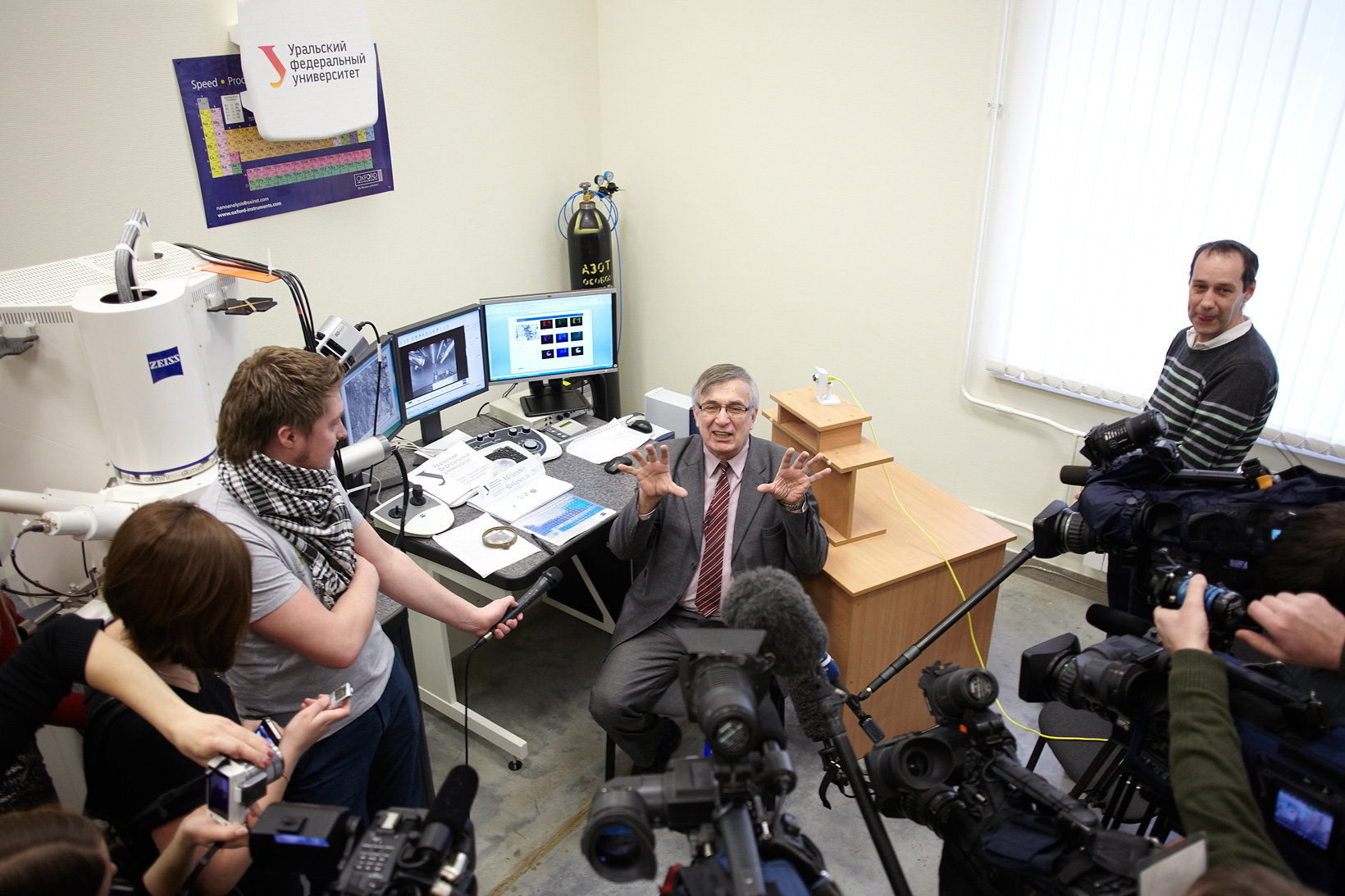
Ural Federal University scientist Victor Grohovsky talks to press during presentation of analysis results in Ekaterinburg

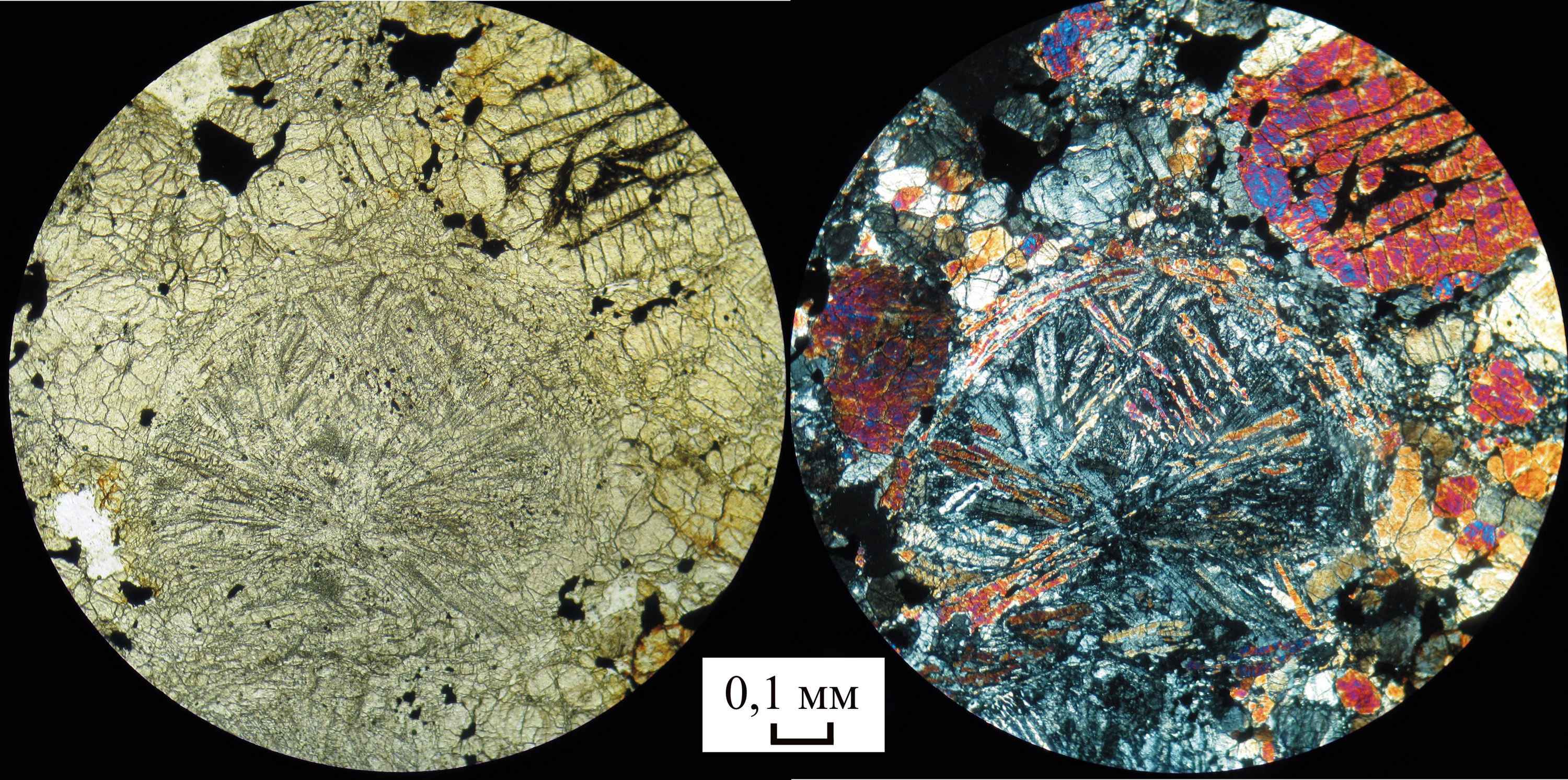
The meteorite under microscopic view (scale: 0.1 mm (1/250 in))

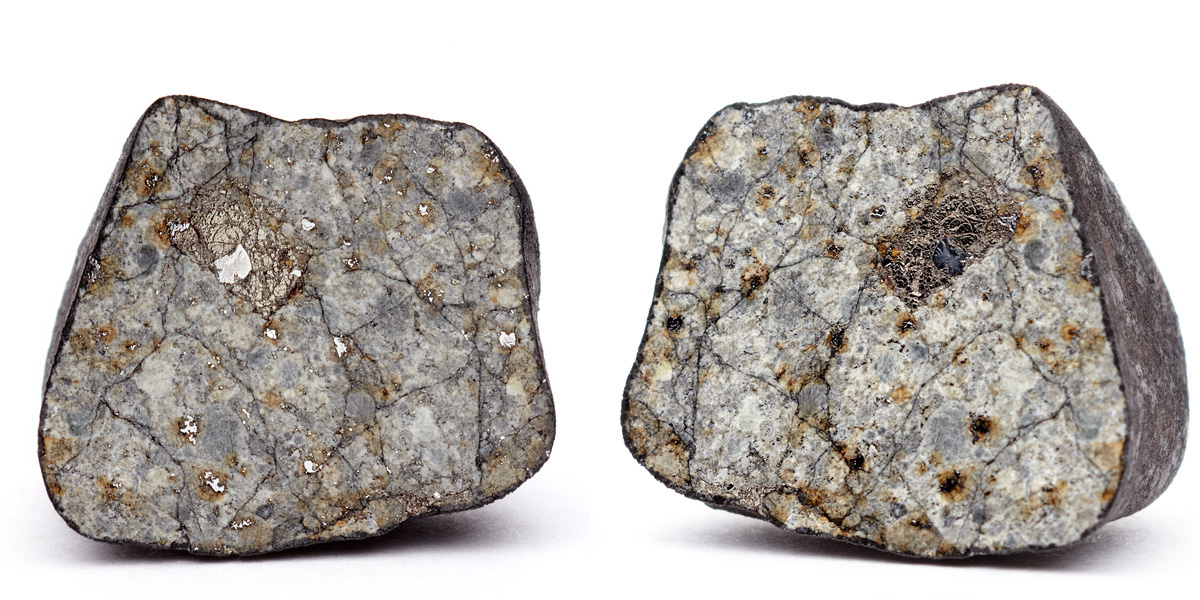
Macro photo of a piece of Chelyabinsk meteorite

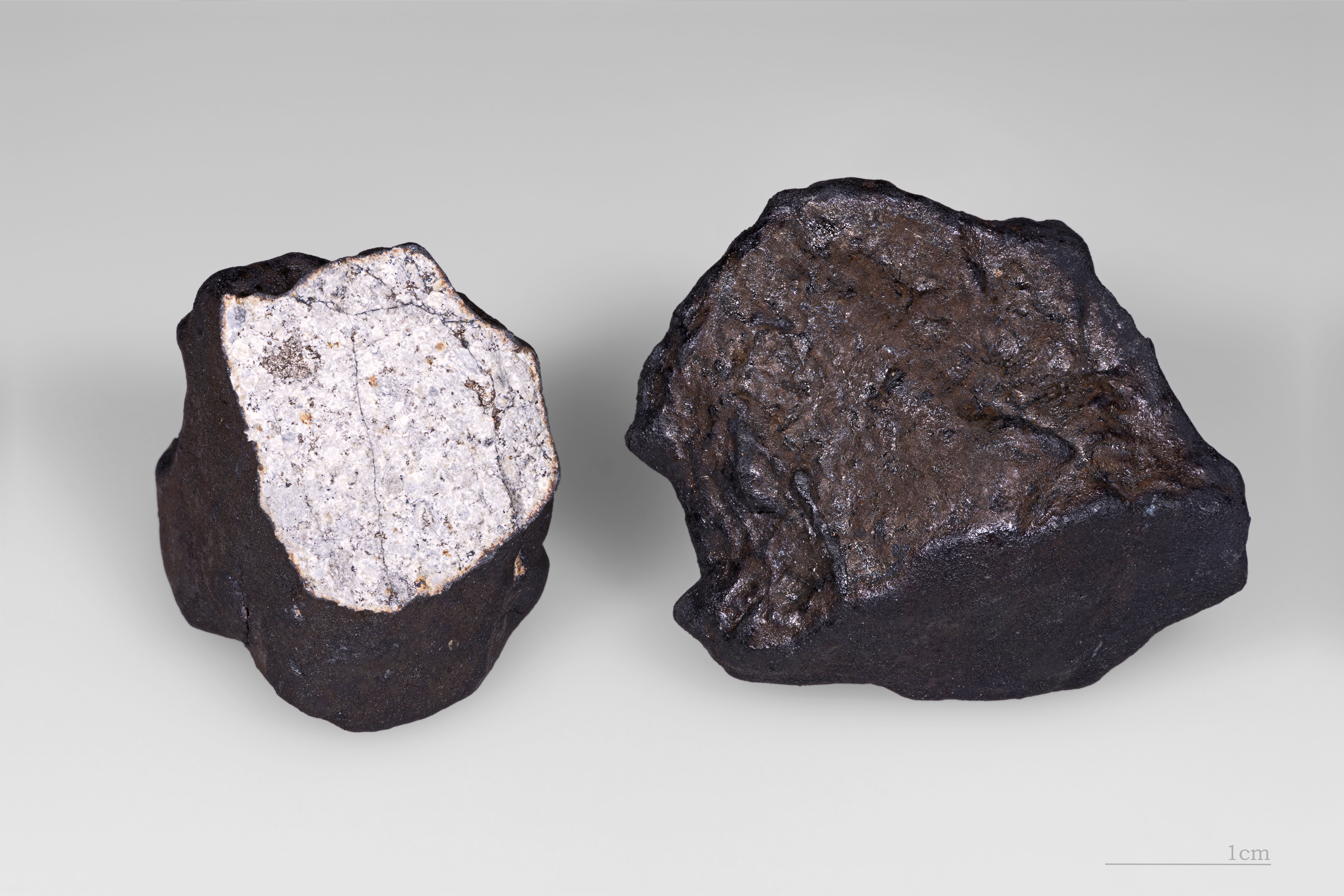
Fragments of the meteorite that were first discovered at Lake Chebarkul

== See also ==
- Meteorite fall
