= Russian Machine Never Breaks =

Ice hockey blog

Russian Machine Never Breaks (RMNB) is a credentialed Washington, D.C. area hockey blog that covers professional ice hockey. Created in 2009, RMNB received local and national media attention when it was the first U.S. media outlet to cover the 2013 Russian meteor event in the city of Chelyabinsk, Russia.

== About ==
RMNB is a fan-operated, credentialed, multinational hockey blog that covers the Washington Capitals of the National Hockey League, the Hershey Bears (the Capitals' American Hockey League affiliate), and their respective players. Created in 2009 by Ian Oland and Peter Hassett, RMNB's mission is to "make hockey as fun to read about as it is to watch". RMNB takes its name from current Capitals captain and Russian native, Alexander Ovechkin. In response to questions from the media about a potential injury after being hit with a puck, Ovechkin was quoted in 2006 stating, "I'm okay; Russian machine never breaks."

In February 2013, RMNB received local and national media attention when co-founder and writer Peter Hassett, with contributing writers Fedor Fedin and Ian Oland, published the first U.S. media report about the Russian meteor event.

In November 2013, the Washington Capitals announced that RMNB would contribute segments to their Emmy-winning television show, Caps Red Line.

== Staff ==
Russian Machine Never Breaks has eight current contributors. All staff members work full-time for other companies or are pursuing academic degrees in the United States and abroad.

=== Ian Oland ===
Ian Oland is RMNB's co-founder (with Peter Hassett) and publisher. He is a graduate of University of Maryland, Baltimore County and works as the Senior Email Marketing Design Strategist at Visual Data Systems. His work has been published in The Washington Post.

=== Peter Hassett ===
Peter Hassett is RMNB's co-founder (with Ian Oland) and managing editor. Hassett writes game recaps and analysis. He is a graduate of James Madison University and works as the Director of Technology at Patient Solutions at DrugDev.

=== Rachel Cohen ===
Rachel Cohen is a graphic artist and the blog's lead illustrator. She graduated from the University of Hartford in 2013. Her work has been featured in The Hockey News and USA Today.

=== Chris Cerullo ===
Chris Cerullo is a writer and analyst for RMNB. He graduated from the Catholic University of America in 2017. Cerullo writes game recaps, does RMNB's NHL entry draft coverage, and has an analysis series called Numbers for the Morning After that is posted the morning after every Capitals game.

=== Elyse Bailey ===
Elyse Bailey is a writer for RMNB. She graduated from George Mason University and works as a USA Executive for VisitBritain.

=== Elizabeth Kong ===
Elizabeth Kong is a photographer and writer for RMNB. She also photographs music for DC101 Radio.

=== Cara Bahniuk ===
Cara Bahniuk is a photographer and associate art director for RMNB. She is a Loyola University Chicago graduate and works at The Pew Charitable Trusts.

== Notable coverage ==
=== 2013 Russian meteor event ===
On February 14, 2013, Peter Hassett was contacted by Moscow correspondent Fedor Fedin about reports of an explosion in Chelyabinsk, Russia. The writers were following news about Chelyabinsk because it is the hometown of Capitals center Evgeny Kuznetsov. By gathering information from social media videos and Twitter, including an account from former NHL goalie Michael Garnett and other eyewitnesses, Fedin and Hassett discovered that a meteor had hit Chelyabinsk, and Hassett (with additional reporting by Fedin and Ian Oland) published the news on their blog.

Following the story, Hassett was interviewed by Garance Franke-Ruta, a senior editor at The Atlantic. He confirmed that he published the article a little after 11:00 p.m. EST. Franke-Ruta wrote that The Associated Press did not break the news until 12:21 a.m. EST Friday, confirming that Hassett and RMNB were the first to report the story in the United States. After Franke-Ruta's story was published, other news outlets began to pick up the story.

On Friday evening, Hassett was interviewed by Will Thomas of Fox News DC who also confirmed that RMNB was the first to report on the meteor. On Sunday morning February 17, 2013, Hassett and Gordon were interviewed by NPR's Weekend Edition Sunday host, Rachel Martin. On this broadcast Martin confirmed that RMNB was the first to break the story in the United States by "about an hour and a half".

Though not affiliated with the Washington Capitals nor endorsed by them, the Capitals' owner, Ted Leonsis, congratulated RMNB for its coverage of the meteor event.

=== Michal Neuvirth translation controversy ===
In August 2012, Russian Machine Never Breaks published a translation of an interview given by Washington Capitals goaltender Michal Neuvirth to František Suchan of iSportz.Cz.

The interview contained controversial remarks about current teammate Braden Holtby, Capitals' captain Alexander Ovechkin, former teammate Alexander Semin, former coach Dale Hunter, and other Capitals players. The interview was picked up by hockey media in the United States and internationally. The following news outlets published all or parts of RMNB's translation: The Washington Post, Sporting News, NBC Sports' ProHockey Talk, NHL SportsNet, and Yahoo Sports.

In response to the coverage, Michal Neuvirth conducted an interview with Washington Capitals senior writer Mike Vogel where he commented that "there was some misunderstanding. They changed my meaning a lot. I was talking about the boys in a good way. They translate to the way they want it. I feel like they got nothing to write about right now." Neuvirth was also quoted by NHL News and Sportsnet, saying the interview was mistranslated.

On August 21, 2012, RMNB responded to criticisms of their translation by publishing a clarification about the interview. Hassett wrote, "While we stand by the articles we published, we acknowledge that translation is as much an art as it is an academic skill." He wrote that, "Neuvirth's meaning may have been misconstrued." However, in a post on August 30, 2012, RMNB announced that its team had hired a professional translation firm, TransPerfect, to objectively translate the Neuvirth interview. RMNB compared TransPerfect's translation and its own side by side. After review, RMNB stands by its translation as the writers felt the professional translation and their own were nearly identical in meaning and therefore accurate.

=== Tim Thomas "Obama" signs and masks ===
Leading into the Capitals 2011-12 Eastern Conference Quarterfinals matchup against the Boston Bruins, Hassett published an article discussing Tim Thomas's performance after he snubbed the U.S. president Barack Obama during the Bruins' Stanley Cup celebration at the White House. Via a chart, Hassett showed that as Obama's approval rating got stronger, Thomas's save percentage got weaker. Because of this, Oland also made Obama signs and masks to try and throw Thomas off his game. Many Capitals fans in game three printed the signs out and wore the masks, gaining the blog national attention. Hockey Night in Canada did a segment on the posts during their live coverage of the game, The Huffington Post wrote a story about it, and ESPN's Pardon the Interruption discussed the signs and masks the next day on its show.

=== Barack the Red campaign ===
The Barack the Red campaign is a petition by Capitals fans for former President Barack Obama to attend a Washington Capitals game. The campaign was started by Ian Oland, co-founder of Russian Machine Never Breaks. The Barack the Red website features an open letter to President Obama and a petition with a link to the Facebook page where supporters are asked to "like" the page to show support for the campaign.

In 2011, Robert Gibbs, a senior campaign advisor for Barack Obama, was asked if President Obama were planning to attend a Washington Capitals game. The reporter, The Washington Post's Scott Wilson, referenced the Barack the Red campaign started by Oland.

President Obama has not attended a Washington Capitals game.

=== 2015 Winter Classic jerseys ===
On September 22, 2014, Russian Machine Never Breaks revealed images from inside DC's Nationals Park that suggested the Washington Capitals would be introducing a new logo for the 2015 NHL Winter Classic. The following day, RMNB was the first to post leaked images of the new Winter Classic jerseys prior to their official unveiling.
