= 2011 EO40 =

Asteroid

2011 EO_{40}
Discovery
- Discovered by: Richard A. Kowalski (Mount Lemmon Survey)
- Discovery date: 10 March 2011

Designations
- Minor planet category: Apollo NEO PHA; Earth crosser

Orbital characteristics
- Epoch 21 November 2025 (JD 2461000.5)
- Uncertainty parameter 1
- Aphelion: 2.5481 AU (381.19 Gm)
- Perihelion: 0.76020 AU (113.724 Gm)
- Semi-major axis: 1.65416 AU (247.459 Gm)
- Eccentricity: 0.54043
- Orbital period (sidereal): 2.1275 yr (777.08 d)
- Mean anomaly: 5.6°
- Mean motion: 0° 27^{m} 47.772^{s} / day
- Inclination: 3.3615°
- Longitude of ascending node: 50.172°
- Argument of perihelion: 17.230°
- Earth MOID: 0.048041 AU (7.1868 Gm)
- Jupiter MOID: 2.79521 AU (418.157 Gm)

Physical characteristics
- Dimensions: 120–280 m^{[a]}
- Absolute magnitude (H): 21.9

2011 EO_{40} is an asteroid, classified as a near-Earth object and a potentially hazardous asteroid of the Apollo group. It is a possible candidate for the parent body of the Chelyabinsk superbolide.

== Discovery, orbit and physical properties ==
2011 EO_{40} was discovered by Richard A. Kowalski on 10 March 2011 while observing for the Mount Lemmon Survey.

Its orbit is typical of Apollo asteroids and is characterized by significant eccentricity (0.54), low inclination (3.36º), and a semi-major axis of 1.65 AU. Upon discovery, it was classified as an Earth crosser, a near-Earth asteroid (NEA) and a potentially hazardous asteroid (PHA) by the Minor Planet Center. It was listed on the Sentry Risk Table for less than one day. Its orbit is in need of additional observations to determine if it is part of an asteroid family; as of October 2015 the orbit is determined using just twenty observations spanning an observation arc of 34 days. 2011 EO_{40} has an absolute magnitude of 21.5, which gives a characteristic diameter of about 200 metres (660 ft).

== Relationship to the Chelyabinsk superbolide ==
Recent calculations indicate that this object is a plausible candidate to be the parent body of the Chelyabinsk superbolide, since its orbit is very similar to the computed, pre-impact path of the Chelyabinsk meteoroid. It has relatively frequent close encounters with Venus, the Earth–Moon system, and Mars. It had a close encounter with Earth on 28 January 2011 at 0.0953 AU (14,260,000 km; 8,860,000 mi), and it will have a nominal Earth approach on 23 September 2025 at about 0.06 AU (9,000,000 km; 5,600,000 mi). Asteroid 2011 EO_{40} experiences close approaches to the Earth–Moon system following a rather regular pattern, every 17 years approximately due to the combined action of multiple secular resonances.

== Visibility ==
2011 EO_{40} had opposition windows on 7 June 2016 at magnitude 24.5, and 28 May 2018 at magnitude 24.6 but was not observed during either opposition. The asteroid was recovered on 15 August 2025 by Pan-STARRS. The best observation window was on 2–23 September 2025. Depending on the Earth approach distance (0.04–0.12 AU), it should have been brighter than magnitude 19.

== See also ==
- Carbonaceous chondrite
- Meteorite

== Notes ==
- This is assuming an albedo of 0.20–0.04.
