= Chebarkulsky District =

Chebarkulsky District Чебаркульский район (Russian)
- District
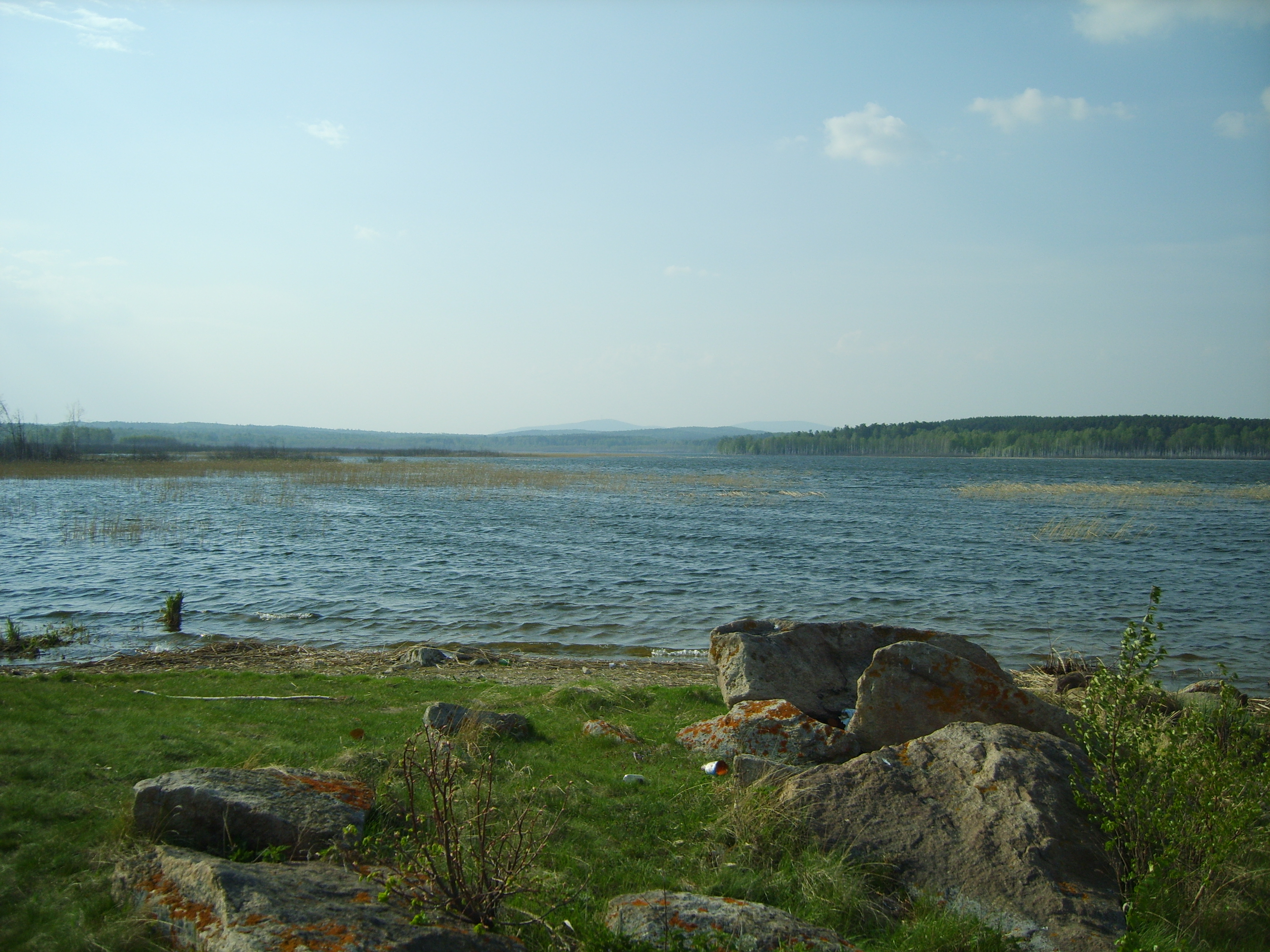
- Lake Chebarkul, Chebarkulsky District

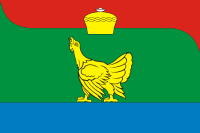
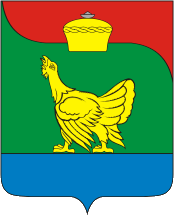
- Flag Coat of arms
- Location of Chebarkulsky District in Chelyabinsk Oblast
- Coordinates: 54°58′40″N 60°22′12″E
- Country: Russia
- Federal subject: Chelyabinsk Oblast
- Established: 18 January 1935
- Administrative center: Chebarkul

Area
  - Total: 2,879 km^{2} (1,112 sq mi)

Population (2010 Census)
  - Total: 29,606
  - Density: 10.28/km^{2} (26.63/sq mi)
  - Urban: 0%
  - Rural: 100%

Administrative structure
  - Administrative divisions: 9 selsoviet
  - Inhabited localities: 56 rural localities

Municipal structure
  - Municipally incorporated as: Chebarkulsky Municipal District
  - Municipal divisions: 0 urban settlements, 9 rural settlements
- Time zone: UTC+5 (MSK+2)
- OKTMO ID: 75657000
- Website: http://ch-adm.ru/

Chebarkulsky District (Russian: Чебарку́льский райо́н) is an administrative and municipal district (raion), one of the twenty-seven in Chelyabinsk Oblast, Russia. It is located in the west of the oblast. The area of the district is 2,879 square kilometers (1,112 sq mi). Its administrative center is the town of Chebarkul (which is not administratively a part of the district). Population: 29,606 (2010 census); 29,251 (2002 Census); 34,244 (1989 Soviet census).

== Administrative and municipal status ==
Within the framework of administrative divisions, Chebarkulsky District is one of the twenty-seven in the oblast. The town of Chebarkul serves as its administrative center, despite being incorporated separately as an administrative unit with the status equal to that of the districts.

As a municipal division, the district is incorporated as Chebarkulsky Municipal District. The Town of Chebarkul is incorporated separately from the district as Chebarkulsky Urban Okrug.
