= Chebarkul, Republic of Bashkortostan =

Chebarkul Чебаркуль
- Village
- Location within Bashkortostan Location within Russia
- Coordinates: 55°12′N 58°25′E
- Country: Russia
- Region: Bashkortostan
- District: Salavatsky District
- Time zone: UTC+5:00

Chebarkul (Russian: Чебаркуль; Bashkir: Сыбаркүл, Sıbarkül) is a rural locality (a village) in Lagerevsky Selsoviet, Salavatsky District, Bashkortostan, Russia. The population was 214 as of 2010. There are 2 streets.

== Geography ==
Chebarkul is located 37 km east of Maloyaz (the district's administrative centre) by road. Sharyakovo is the nearest rural locality.
