= Lake Chebarkul =

Lake in Chebarkulsky District, Russia

Chebarkul Lake
- озеро Чебаркуль (Russian)
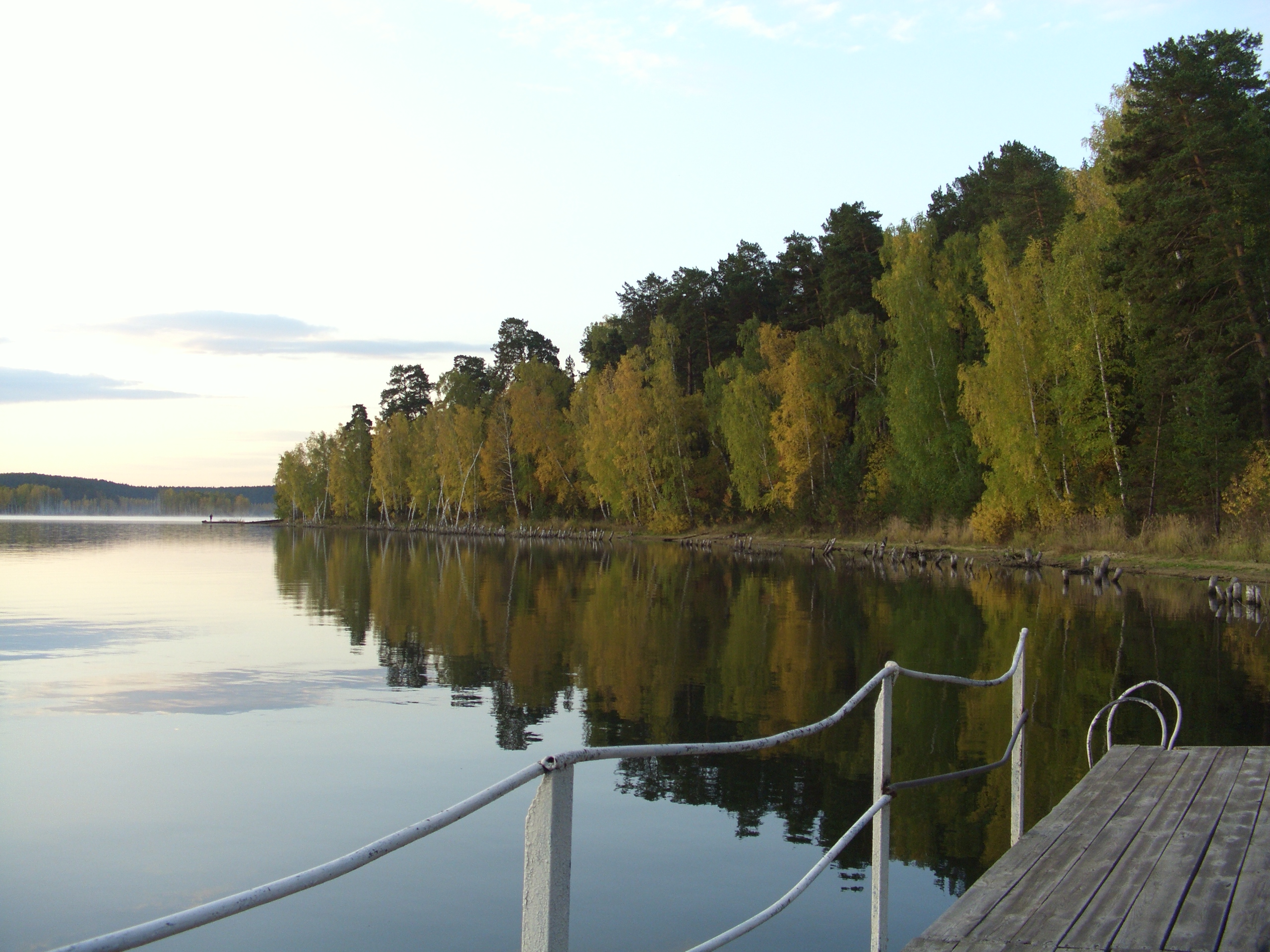

- Location within Russia

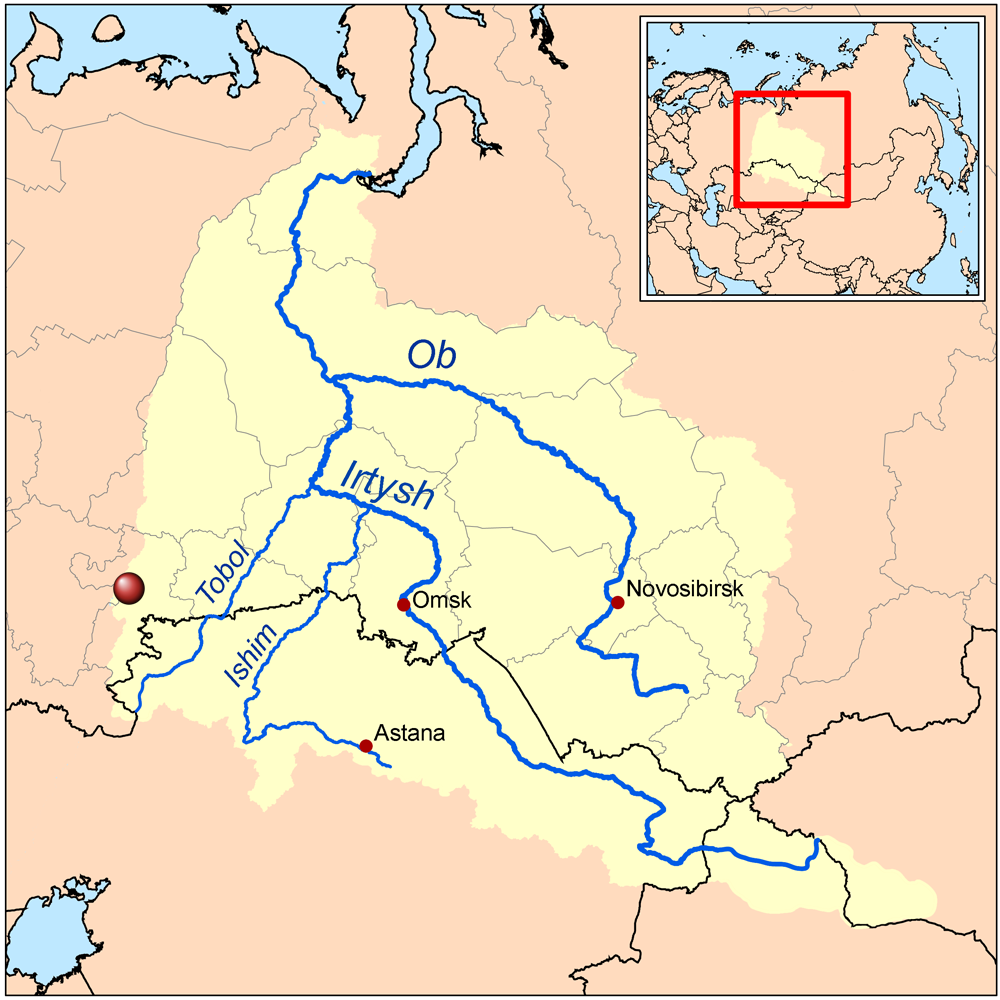
- Lake Chebarkul located within the Ob River watershed
- Location: Chelyabinsk Oblast, Russia
- Coordinates: 54°57′36″N 60°19′48″E
- Primary inflows: Elovka River
- Primary outflows: Koelga River, a small tributary of the Tobol
- Catchment area: 169 km^{2} (65 sq mi)
- Basin countries: Russia
- Surface area: 19.8 km^{2} (7.6 sq mi)
- Max. depth: 12 m (39 ft)
- Water volume: 0.154 km^{3} (125,000 acre⋅ft)
- Surface elevation: 320 m (1,050 ft)
- Frozen: November until April
- Islands: 7
- Settlements: Chebarkul

Lake Chebarkul (Russian: озеро Чебаркуль) is a lake in Chebarkulsky District, Chelyabinsk Oblast, Russia, on the slopes of the southern Urals. The town of Chebarkul lies on its eastern shore, and Chelyabinsk, the administrative center of Chelyabinsk Oblast, is located about 70 kilometres (43 mi) to the northeast. The name of the lake, and the city of the same name, comes from Turkic and means "Beautiful, colorful lake."

Mostly fed by snowmelt from mountain streams, the lake freezes in November and stays icebound until April. The lake is the source of the Koelga River, which in turn flows into the Uvelka, Uy, Tobol, Irtysh, and Ob Rivers. The Ob finally empties into the Arctic Ocean.

There are several wooded islands, including Grachev, Golets, the Ribatskies, and Korablik Islands. The Krutik, Marin and Nazarychev peninsulas extend into the lake. Rest homes and sanatoria are located on the shores. Lake Chebarkul is the largest of several lakes in the region, which collectively take on the name "Chebarkulsky lakes."

Fish that can be found in the lake include tench, carp, crucian carp, bream, pike, and perch.

== 2013 Chelyabinsk meteorite impact ==
On 15 February 2013, local fishermen found a hole in the ice where a large fragment from the 2013 Russian meteor event likely struck the frozen lake. The hole was circular, and about 6 metres (20 ft) across. Police immediately cordoned off this site, as well as one other possible impact site in the area of the lake, but scientists and interested people streamed to the area to investigate.

In the days after the impact, black fragments of rock were found around the hole, which scientists from Ural Federal University suspect are meteorite fragments, and composed of about 10% iron. Months later, divers found a large meteorite fragment on the lakebed, and it was dredged to the surface on October 16, 2013. This fragment weighed about 570 kilograms (1,260 lb).

=== Gallery ===
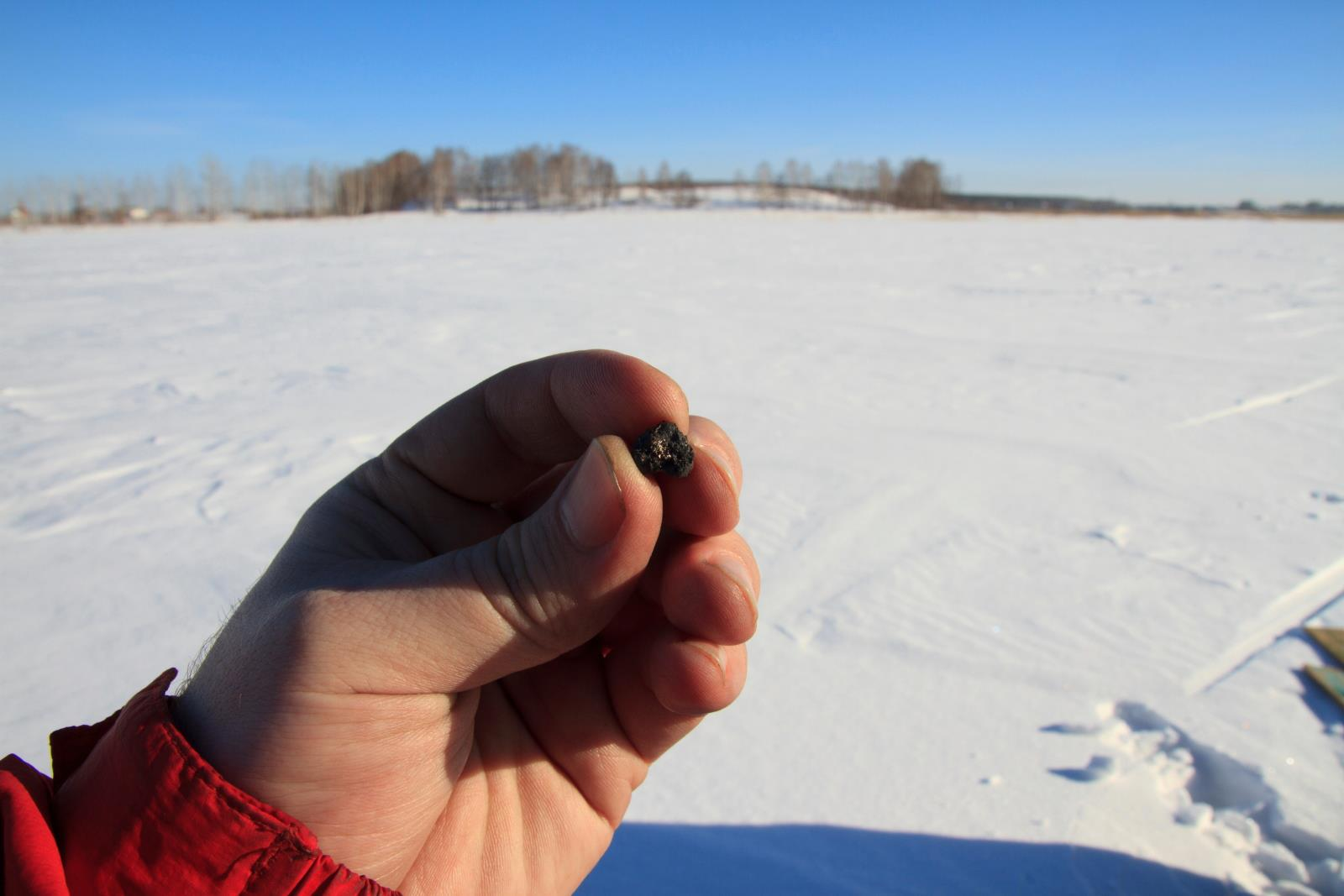
Scientists found meteorite samples on the ice of frozen Lake Chebarkul.

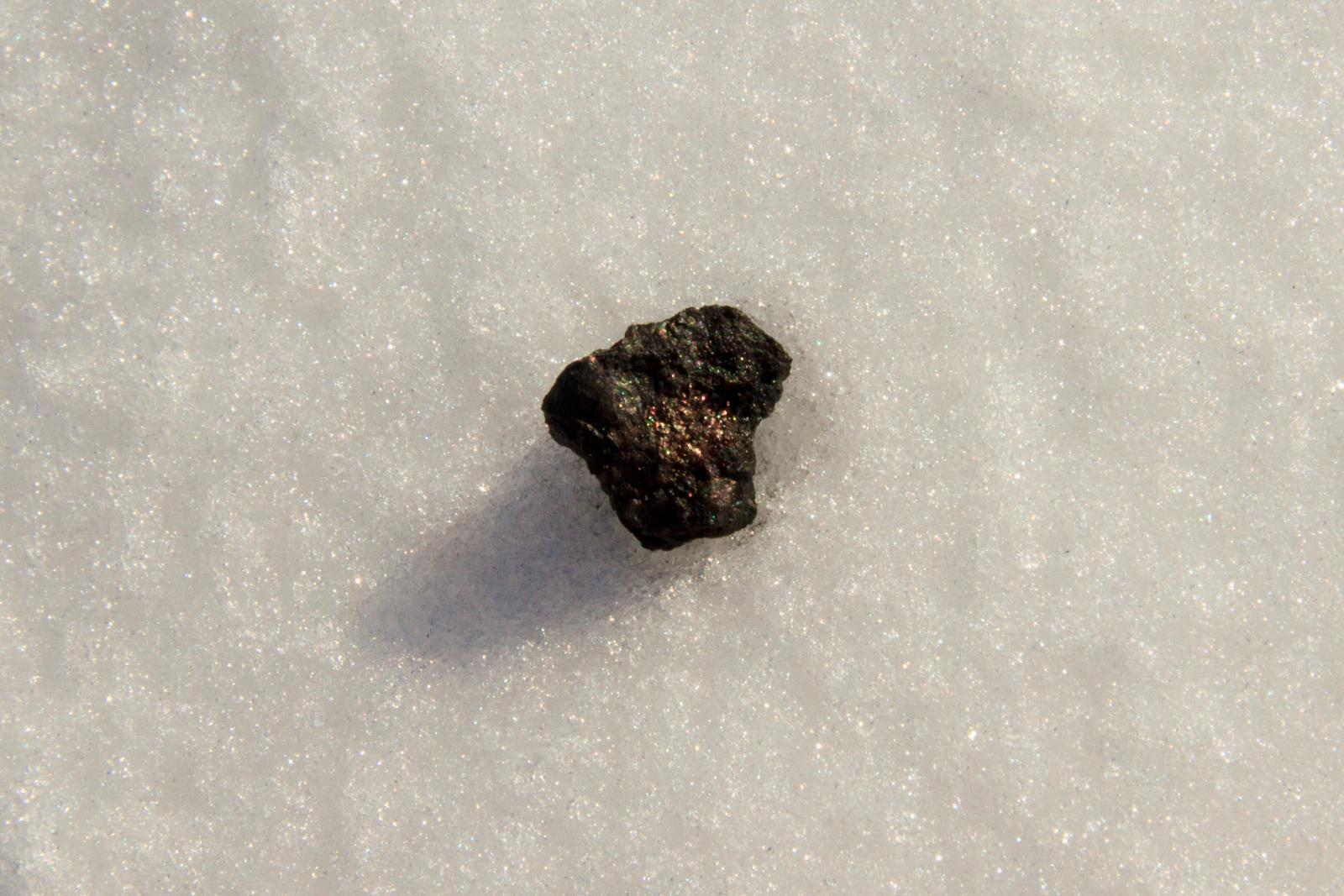
The meteorite fragments are about 10% iron.

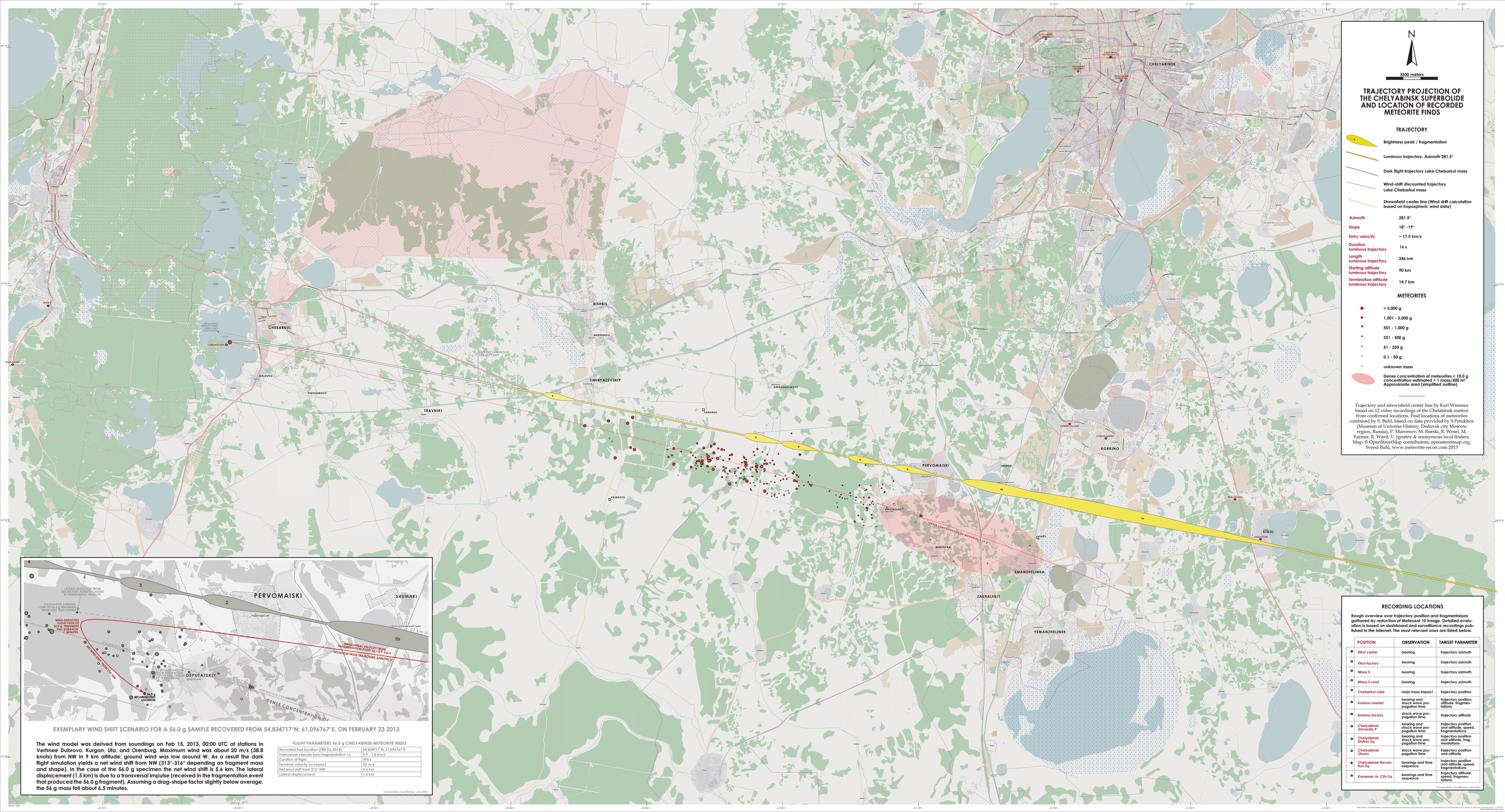
Map showing places where meteorite fragments were found, including Lake Chebarkul.
