= Chebarkul =

Town in Chelyabinsk Oblast, Russia

Chebarkul Чебаркуль
- Town
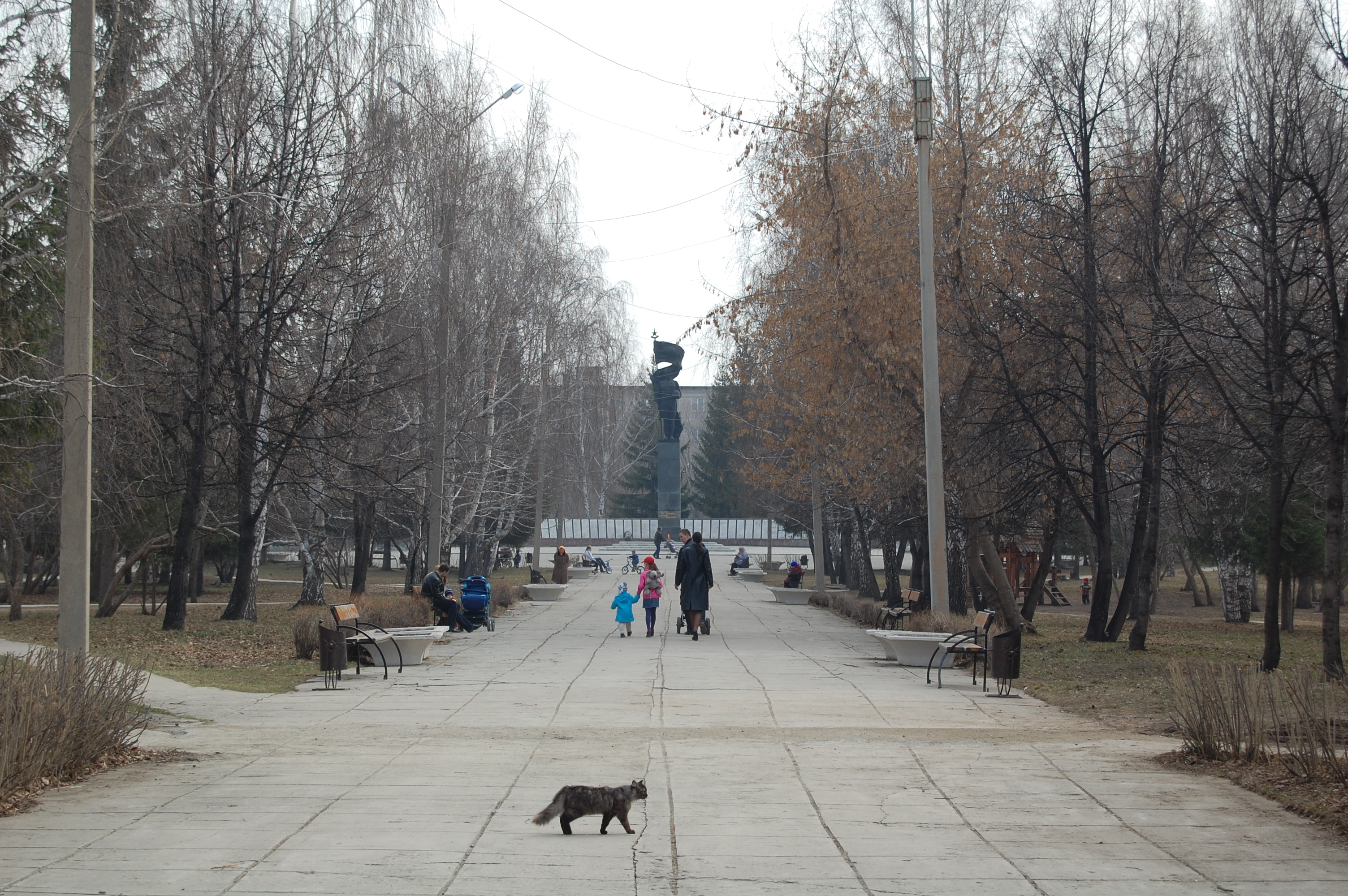
- A park in the center of Chebarkul

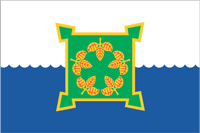
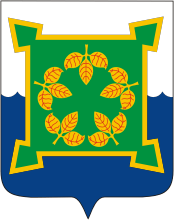
- Flag Coat of arms
- Interactive map of Chebarkul
- Location of Chebarkul Chebarkul (Chelyabinsk Oblast)
- Coordinates: 54°59′N 60°22′E
- Country: Russia
- Federal subject: Chelyabinsk Oblast
- Founded: 1736
- Town status since: October 25, 1951
- Elevation: 330 m (1,080 ft)

Population (2010 Census)
  - Total: 42,844
  - Estimate (2025): 44,671 (+4.3%)

Administrative status
  - Subordinated to: Town of Chebarkul
  - Capital of: Chebarkulsky District, Town of Chebarkul

Municipal status
  - Urban okrug: Chebarkulsky Urban Okrug
  - Capital of: Chebarkulsky Urban Okrug, Chebarkulsky Municipal District
- Time zone: UTC+5 (MSK+2)
- Postal codes: 456438–456447, 456449
- OKTMO ID: 75758000001
- Website: www.chebarcul.ru

Chebarkul (Russian: Чебарку́ль) is a town in Chelyabinsk Oblast, Russia, located on the shores of Lake Chebarkul, 78 kilometers (48 mi) west of Chelyabinsk, the administrative center of the oblast. Population: 42,844 (2010 census); 47,144 (2002 census); 50,062 (1989 Soviet census).

== Etymology ==
The name of the town derives from the Bashkir/Tatar words meaning "a particolored lake".

== History ==
Founded in 1736 as a fortress on the border between Russian and Bashkir lands, it later grew into a large Cossack stanitsa. The fortress was founded with the permission of Bashkir Tarkhan Taymas Shaimov, who was the owner of these lands. Town status was granted to it on October 25, 1951.

=== 2013 meteor event ===
In February 2013, a meteor exploded in Earth's atmosphere and a part of it fell into Lake Chebarkul causing a 6-meter (20 ft) wide hole in the ice covering the lake.

== Administrative and municipal status ==
Within the framework of administrative divisions, Chebarkul serves as the administrative center of Chebarkulsky District, even though it is not a part of it. As an administrative center, it is incorporated separately as the Town of Chebarkul—an administrative unit with the status equal to that of the districts, and is likewise home to several units of Russia's Central Military District; the 90th Guards Tank Division, the 232nd Rocket Artillery Brigade, and the 28th Anti-Aircraft Missile Brigade. As a municipal division, the Town of Chebarkul is incorporated as Chebarkulsky Urban Okrug.
