= Polovinka =

Polovinka (Russian: Половинка) is the name of several rural localities in Russia.

== Modern localities ==
- Polovinka, Altai Krai, a selo in Polovinsky Selsoviet of Sovetsky District in Altai Krai; 52°11′N 85°37′E
- Polovinka, Chebarkulsky District, Chelyabinsk Oblast, a village in Kundravinsky Selsoviet of Chebarkulsky District in Chelyabinsk Oblast
- Polovinka, Katav-Ivanovsky District, Chelyabinsk Oblast, a settlement under the administrative jurisdiction of the Town of Katav-Ivanovsk in Katav-Ivanovsky District of Chelyabinsk Oblast
- Polovinka, Uvelsky District, Chelyabinsk Oblast, a selo in Polovinsky Selsoviet of Uvelsky District in Chelyabinsk Oblast
- Polovinka, Irkutsk Oblast, a selo in Bayandayevsky District of Irkutsk Oblast
- Polovinka, Khanty-Mansi Autonomous Okrug, a settlement in Kondinsky District of Khanty-Mansi Autonomous Okrug
- Polovinka, Kirov Oblast, a village in Ichetovkinsky Rural Okrug of Afanasyevsky District in Kirov Oblast; 58°49′N 52°45′E
- Polovinka, Omsk Oblast, a village in Andreyevsky Rural Okrug of Omsky District in Omsk Oblast
- Polovinka, Chusovoy, Perm Krai, a settlement under the administrative jurisdiction of the town of krai significance of Chusovoy in Perm Krai
- Polovinka, Okhansky District, Perm Krai, a village in Okhansky District of Perm Krai
- Polovinka, Sverdlovsk Oblast, a village under the administrative jurisdiction of the Town of Nizhniye Sergi in Nizhneserginsky District of Sverdlovsk Oblast
- Polovinka, Tomsk Oblast, a selo in Tomsky District of Tomsk Oblast
- Polovinka, Vologda Oblast, a village in Polezhayevsky Selsoviet of Nikolsky District in Vologda Oblast

== Abolished localities ==
- Polovinka, Murmansk Oblast, a rural locality in Murmansk Oblast; abolished in May 1977
