= Yuryuzan =

Yuryuzan may refer to:

- Yuryuzan (river), a river in Russia, left tributary of the Ufa
- Yuryuzan, Chelyabinsk Oblast, a town in Chelyabinsk Oblast, Russia
- Yuryuzan, Republic of Bashkortostan, a village in the Republic of Bashkortostan, Russia
