= Zyuratkul =

Reservoir in Chelyabinsk Oblast, Russia

- Зюраткуль / Йөрәккүл
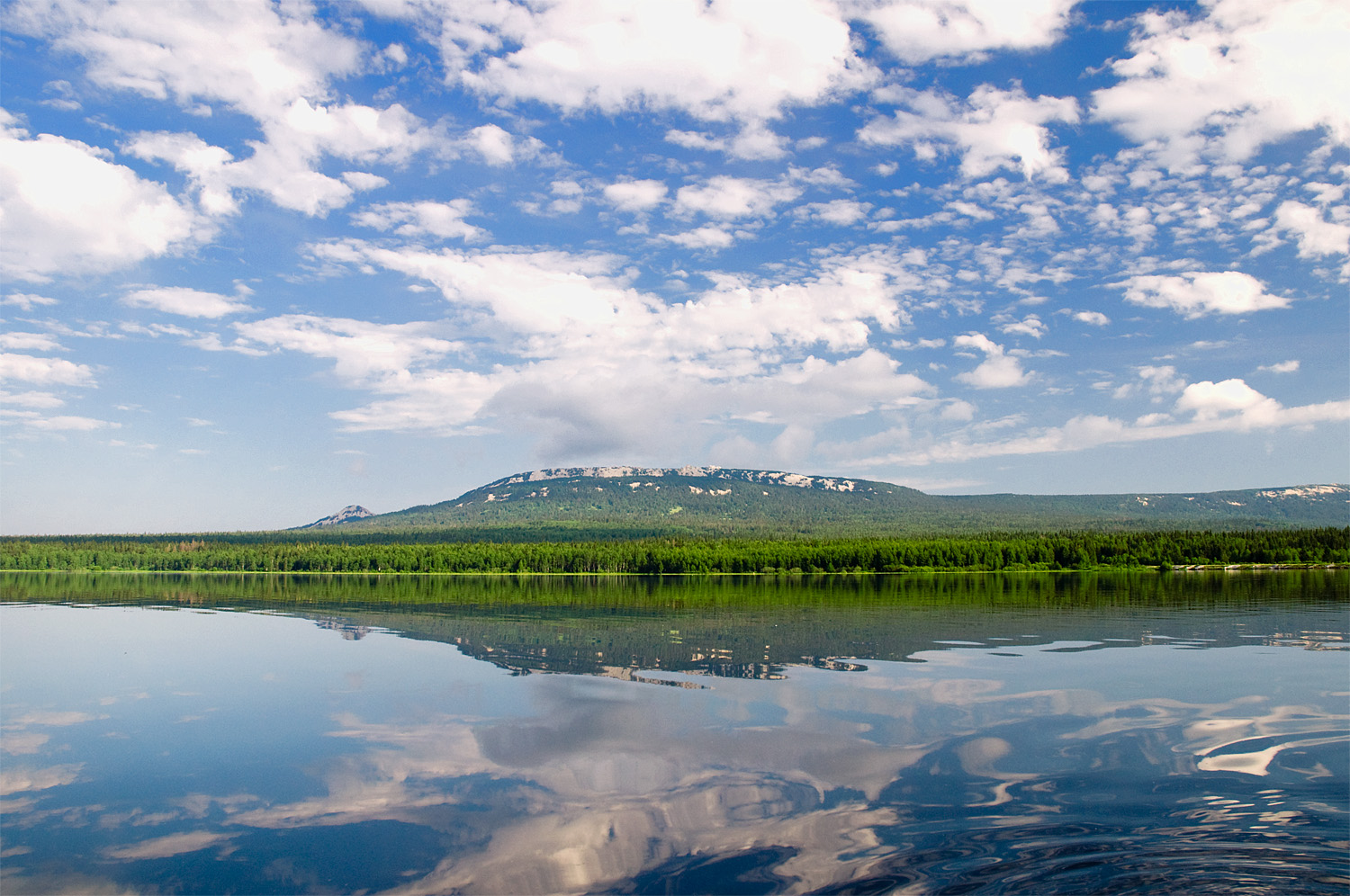
- View of the Zyuratkul ridge from the shore of lake Zyuratkul

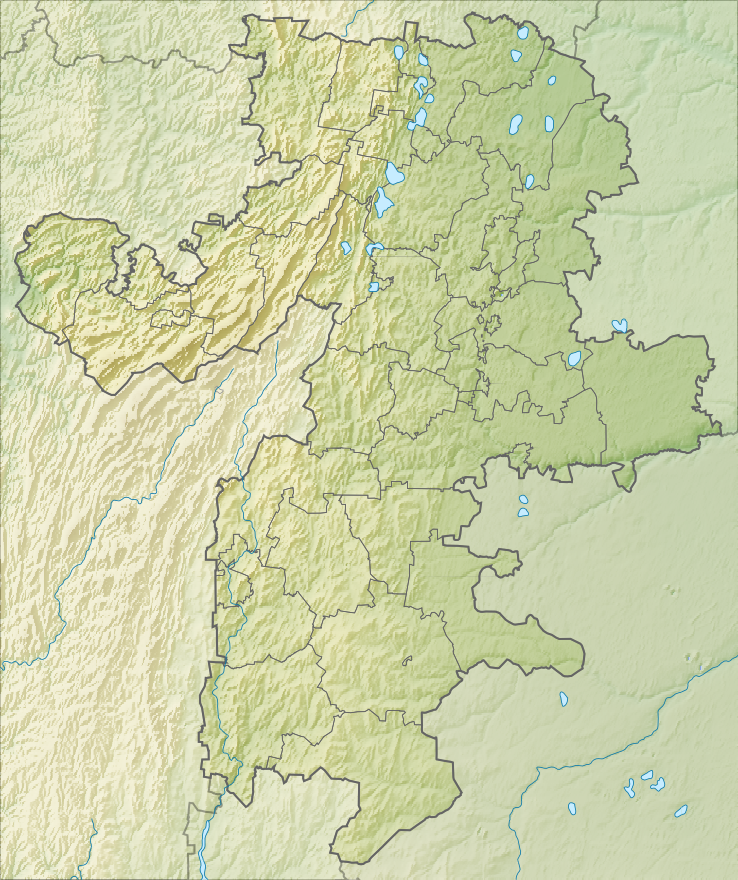
- Location in Chelyabinsk Oblast, Russia Zyuratkul (Russia)
- Location: Southern Urals
- Coordinates: 54°55′0″N 59°12′0″E
- Primary inflows: Bolshoy Kyl
- Primary outflows: Bolshaya Satka
- Catchment area: 179 km^{2} (69 sq mi)
- Basin countries: Russia
- Max. length: 10 km (6.2 mi)
- Max. width: 2 km (1.2 mi)
- Surface area: 178 km^{2} (69 sq mi)
- Average depth: 3.4 m (11 ft)
- Max. depth: 12 m (39 ft)
- Surface elevation: 724 m (2,375 ft)
- Frozen: October to May
- Islands: none

Zyuratkul (Russian: Зюраткуль; Bashkir: Йөрәккүл) is a freshwater lake in Satkinsky District, Chelyabinsk Oblast, Russia.

The name "Zyuratkul" comes from the Bashkir "yöräk/kul" (йөрәк/күл), meaning "heart/lake".

In 1993 the Zyuratkul National Park, a protected area, was established in the lake and its surroundings.

== Geography ==
The lake lies at 724 m (2,375 ft) above mean sea level, being one of the highest lakes of the Southern Urals. It is located about 5 km (3.1 mi) to the south of the small mountain range named after it. Its southern shore stretches at the feet of the northern slopes of the larger Nurgush range. Previously, in its natural state, the lake was smaller and surrounded by swamps. After WWII a dam was built and the new reservoir doubled the surface area of the ancient lake.

The water of Zyuratkul is not as clear as is normal in high-altitude lakes. The reason is that the inflowing watercourses originate in swamps. The Bolshaya Satka, a left hand tributary of the Ay, is the outflow of the lake.

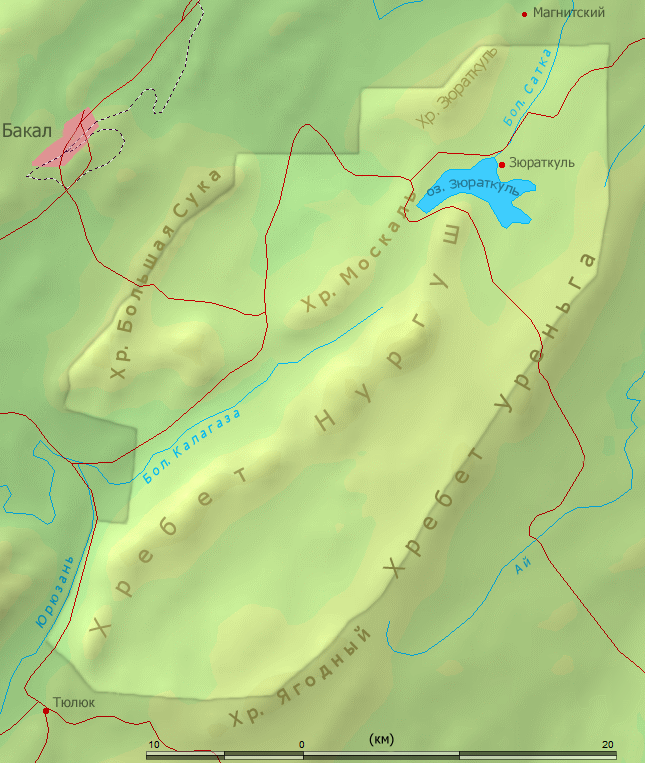
Map of the lake area.

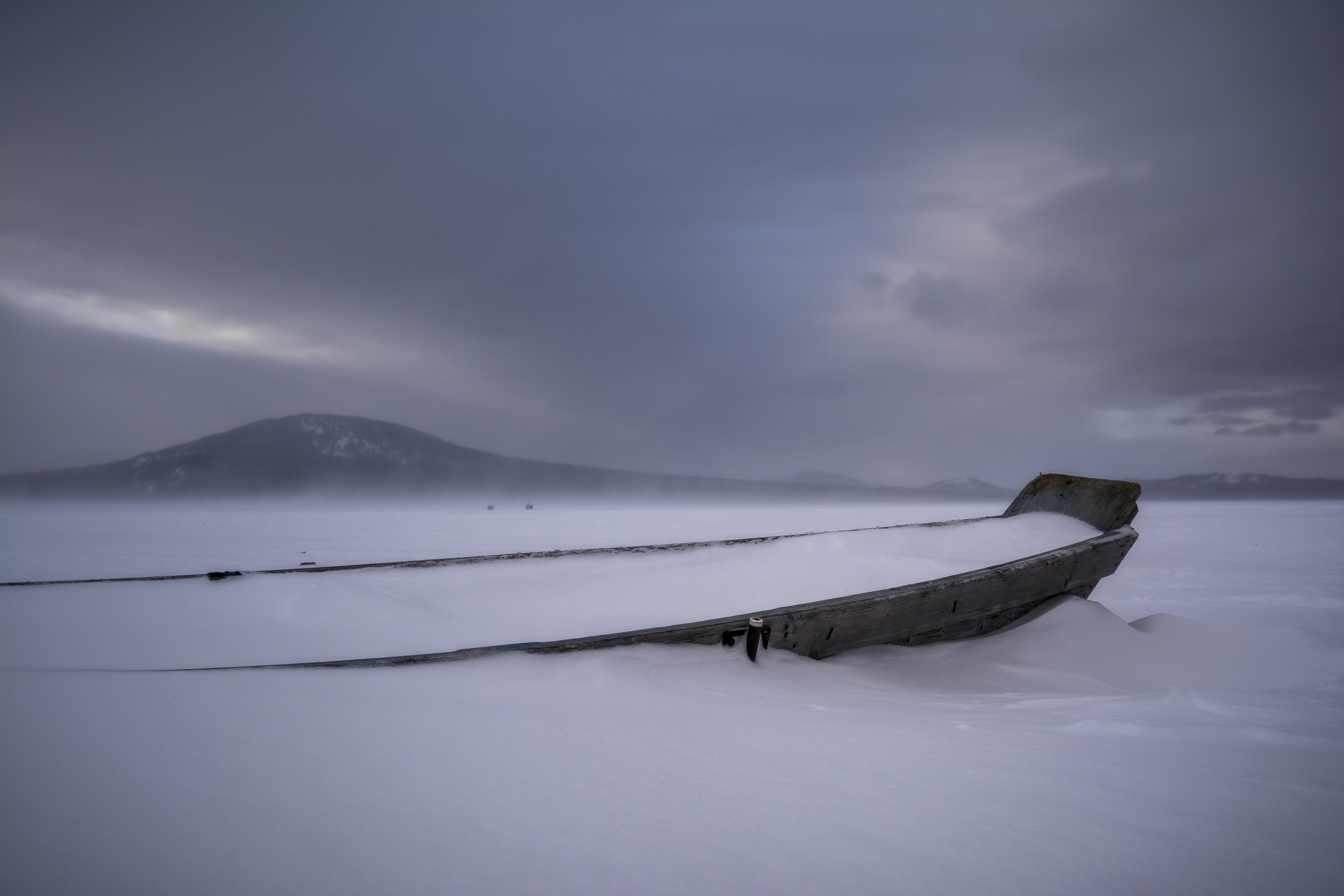
Winter scene in the lake.

== See also ==
- List of lakes of Russia
- Zyuratkul Geoglyph
