= Kusinsky =

Kusinsky (masculine), Kusinskaya (feminine), or Kusinskoye (neuter) may refer to:

- Kusinsky District, a district in Chelyabinsk Oblast, Russia
- Kusinskoye Urban Settlement, a municipal formation which the Town of Kusa in Kusinsky District of Chelyabinsk Oblast, Russia is incorporated as
