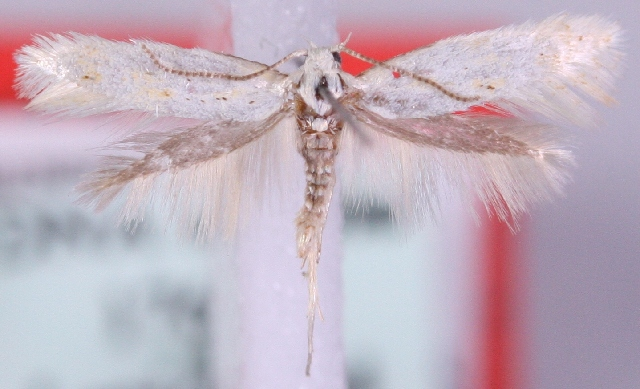

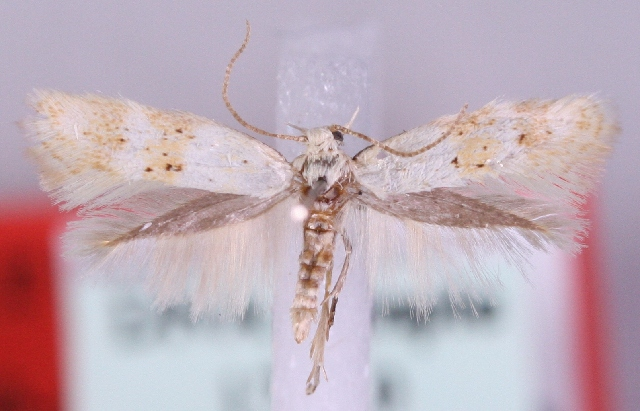

Scientific classification
- Kingdom: Animalia
- Phylum: Arthropoda
- Class: Insecta
- Order: Lepidoptera
- Family: Elachistidae
- Genus: Elachista
- Species: E. olschwangi

Binomial name
- Elachista olschwangi Kaila, 2003

= Elachista olschwangi =

Species of moth

Elachista olschwangi is a moth of the family Elachistidae that can be found in the Southern Ural Mountains of Russia.

The wingspan is 10–11.4 mm.
