= Megaliths in the Urals =

Prehistoric stone structures

Megaliths
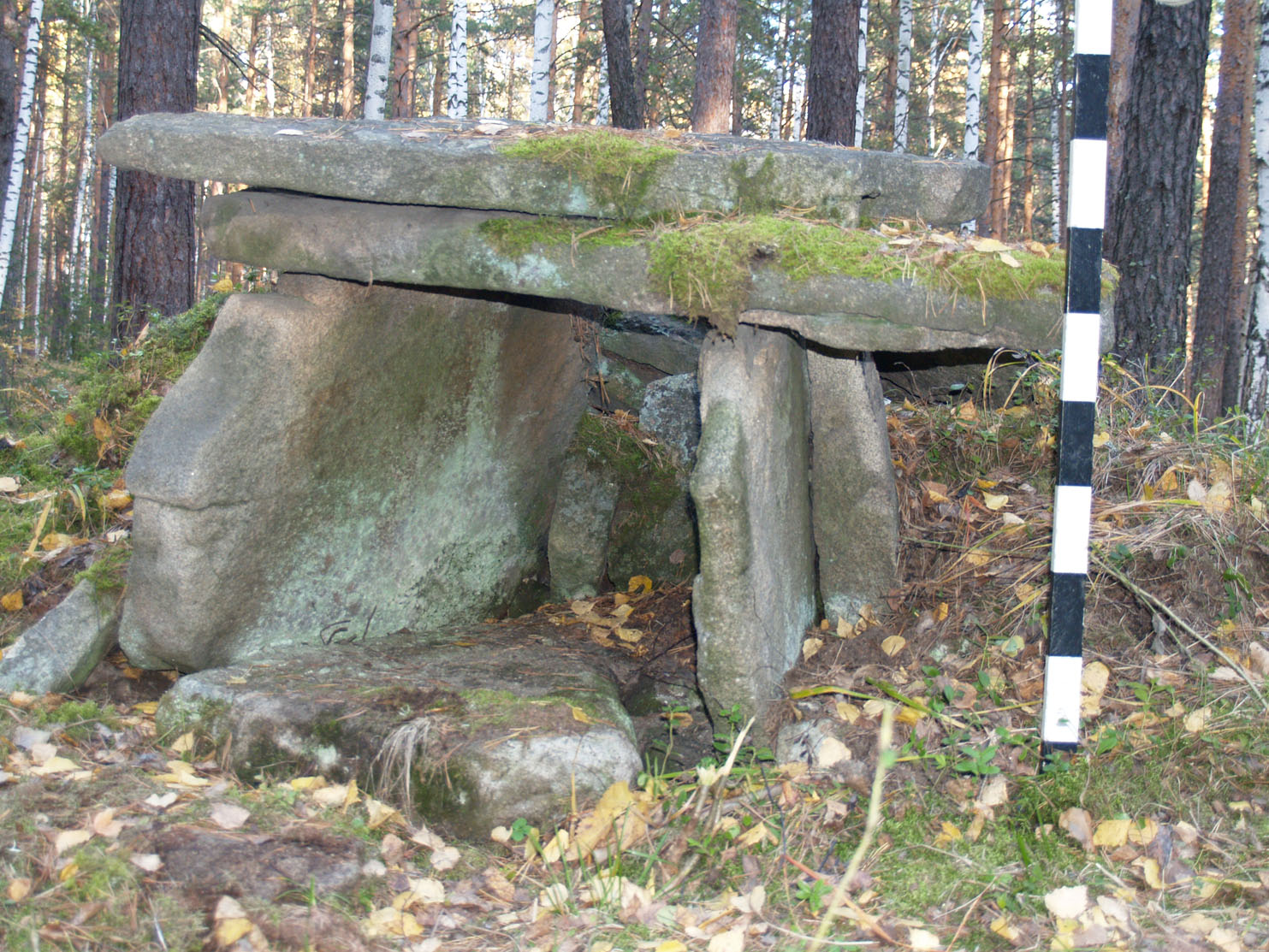
- Dolmen of stone plates

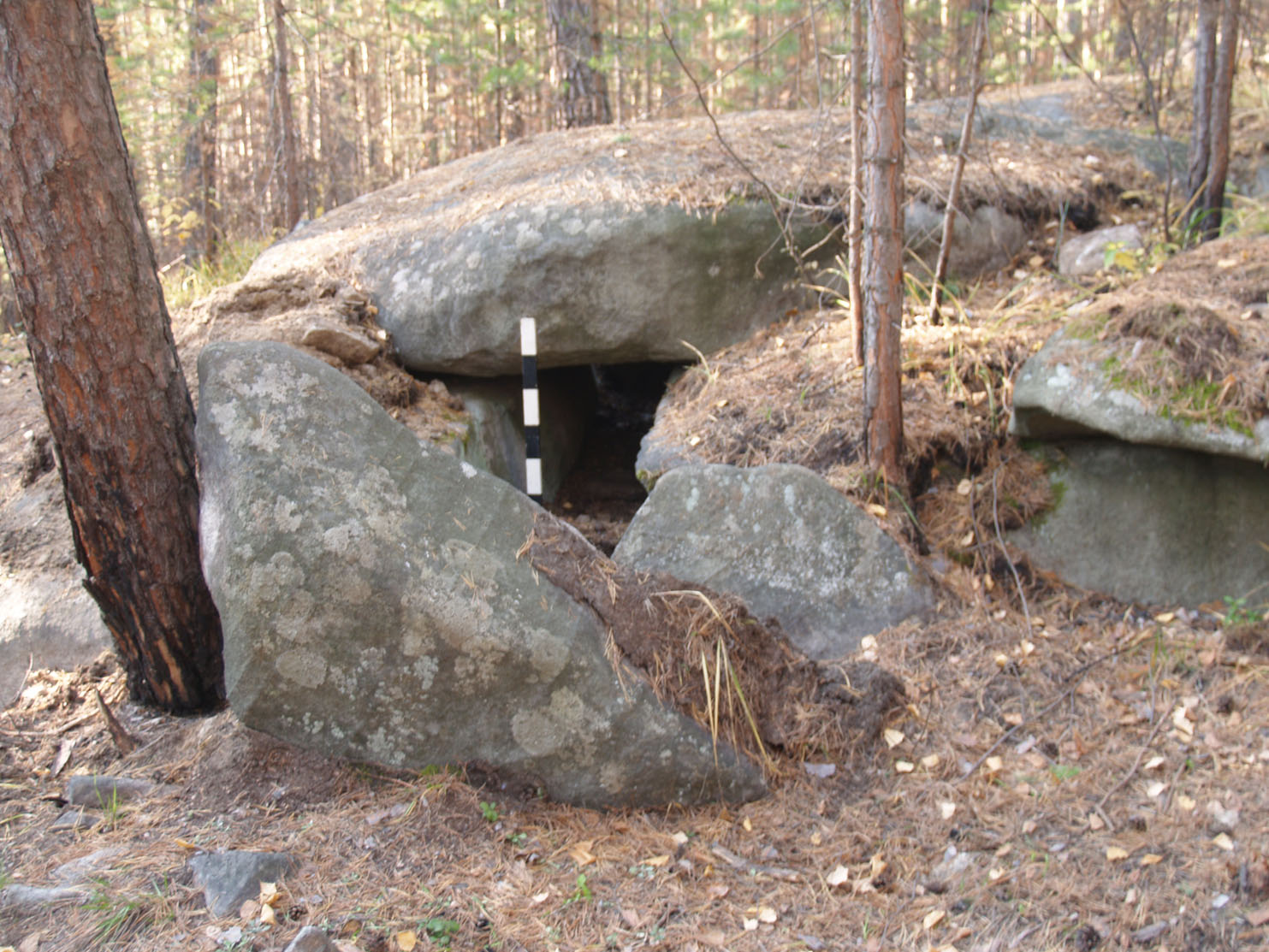
- Material: Stone
- Size: 1.5 - 2.5 m
- Present location: Urals

In recent years, many megaliths have been discovered in the Urals: dolmens, menhirs and a large megalithic cultic complex on Vera Island.

== Dolmens of the Middle Urals ==
At present, more than 200 dolmens have been discovered in the Sverdlovsk Oblast. Specificity of the dolmens in the Middle Urals is their relatively small size (width and length no more than 1.5 - 2.5 m) and original constructions. Based on differences in their construction, it is possible to distinguish two main types of dolmen:

1. dolmens of stone plates and mound;
2. boulder dolmens.

Dolmens of stone plates are structures consisting of a mound of stones and soil, with a stone chamber attached to it. Usually there is a square court in front of such dolmens. Sometimes such a court is surrounded by stones. The boulder dolmens had been made of massive boulders forming a chamber. From above the chamber is covered by either one or several flat boulders. Despite the differences of form and size of their chambers, all the boulder dolmens are identical in one respect: they all have two entrances - the main entrance (in one of its side walls) and another, narrower entrance between the boulders.

== Menhirs ==
The most common megalithic structures of the steppe area of the Urals are menhirs. They are crude or roughly finished stones standing on the surface. This type of object is also found in forested areas, but very rarely and usually associated with dolmens. There are several types of menhirs in the Southern Urals: single, stone rows, complexes of menhirs, and circular structures of menhirs.

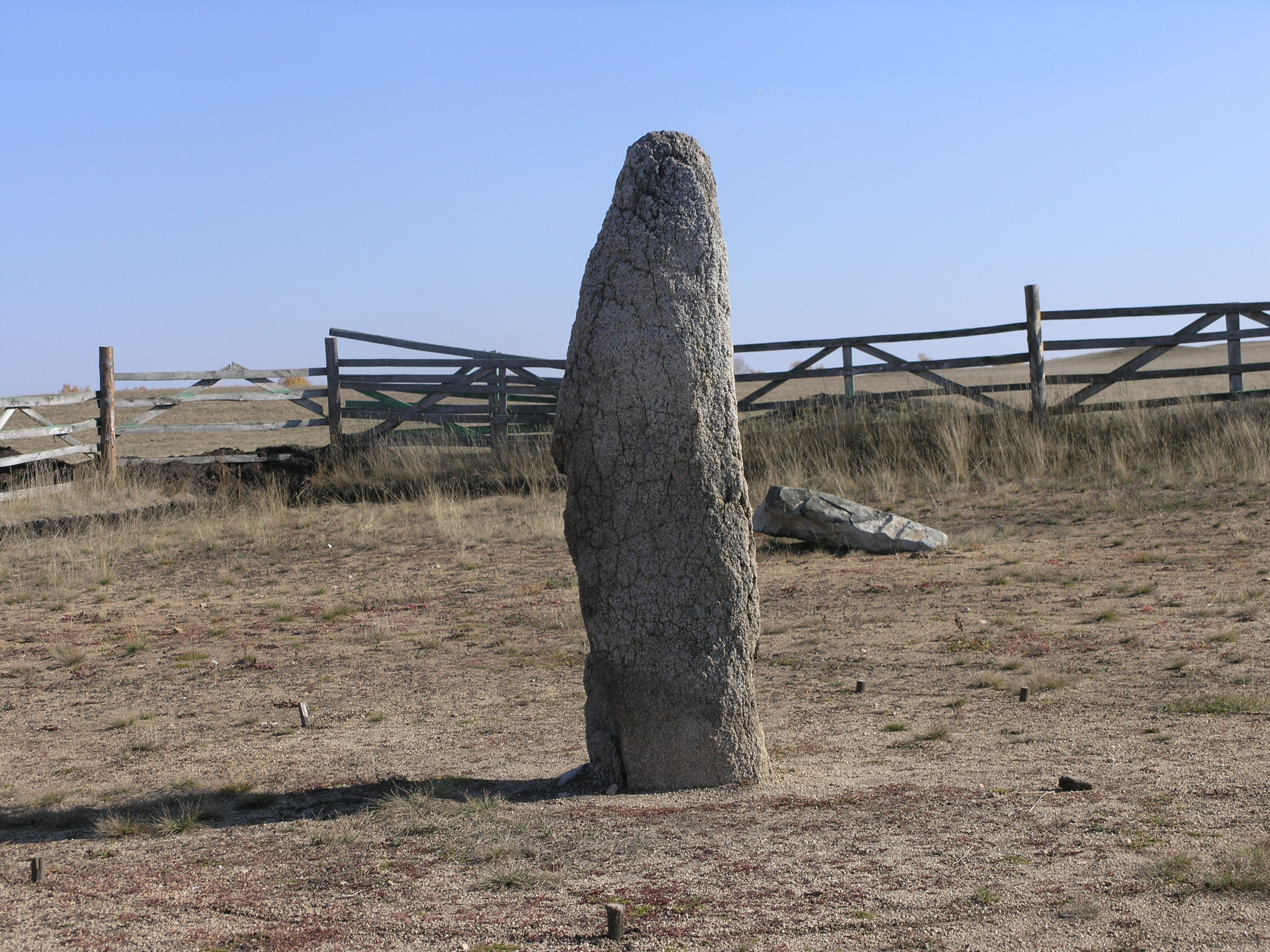
Menhir at Akhunovo.

All discovered single menhirs are usually situated close to Bronze Age settlements or cemeteries. For this reason, archaeologists believe that they date from this period, and the evidence of limited excavations does not contradict this conclusion. Stone rows are for the most part oriented in an east–west direction. The length of some known rows is 13–18 m. The most massive stones are situated in the center, forming the core of the composition. Topography of the stone rows (their location in landscape) is very variable and has no clear strong pattern.

An unexpected discovery is a circular structure of menhirs at the village of Akhunovo in Bashkiria. This is a circular structure with a diameter of about 25 m, and consisting of eight menhirs. The two largest stones are aligned in the north–south direction inside the ring. One of these central stones is surrounded by a ring (diameter 3.5 m) of post holes. The position these holes precisely repeats the structure of the whole stone ring, each hole corresponds to a menhir of the ring.

== Vera Island ==
The greatest megalithic complex of the Ural Mountains is situated on Vera Island in Lake Turgoyak. It belongs to the Chalcolithic (Eneolithic) period. There are several objects:

=== Megalith №1 ===
The biggest structure of the island is megalith No.1 – a stone drywall construction 19×6 m, cut into the bedrock and covered with megalithic capstones. The megalith is oriented west–east. An entrance, partly destroyed now, is in the east. Inside the megalith consists of the long entrance, a Central hall and two chambers (Western and Northern), connected by a corridor one another. The height of all the chambers (with the exception of the low corridors) is no less than 1.9 m, often more than 2 m.

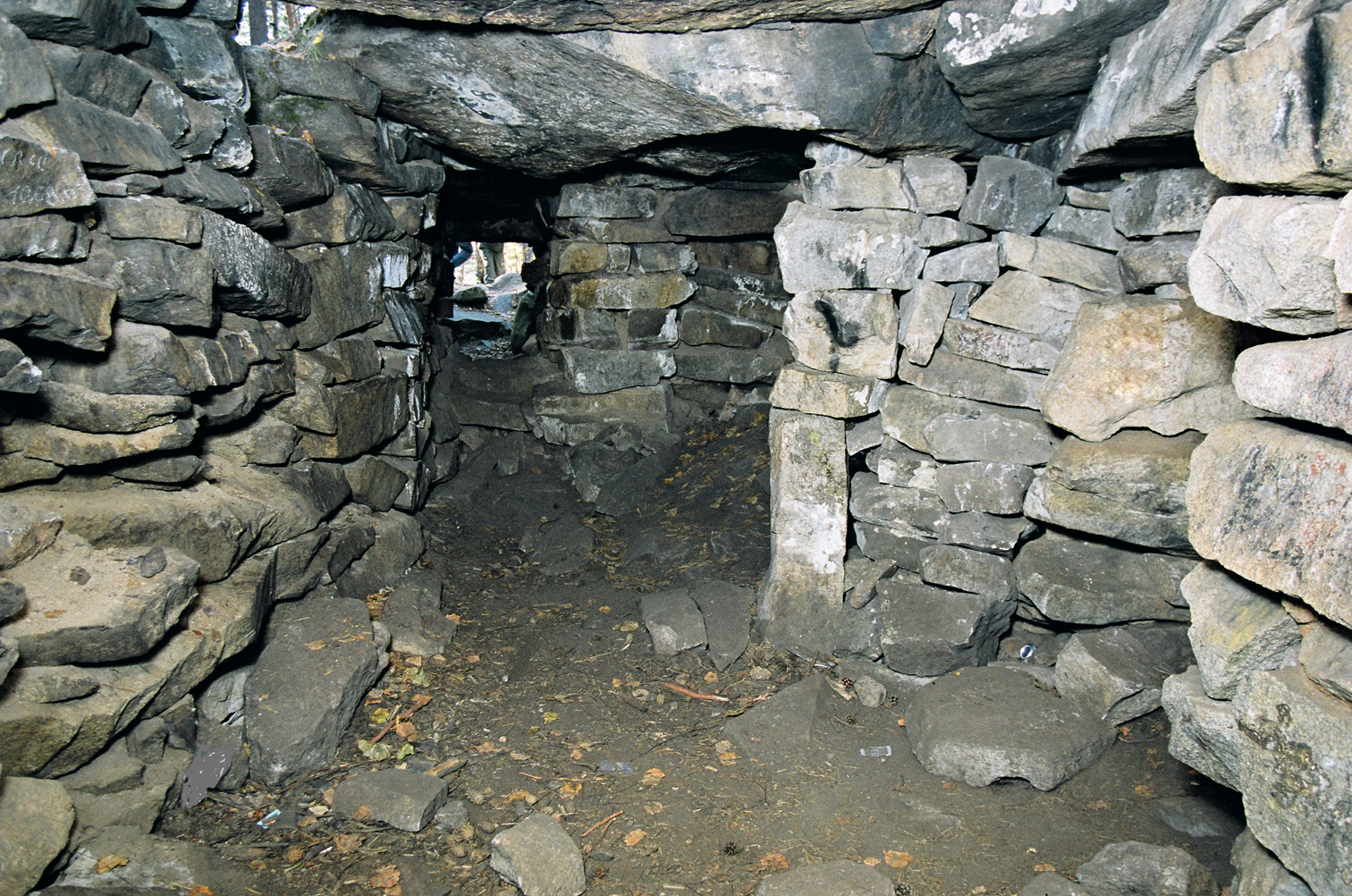
Vera Island. Megalith 1 inside.

The presence of windows and stone sculptures of heads of animals (bull and wolf), together with impressive size of the megalith, distinguish it from other megalithic buildings of the island. It seems that megalith 1 was a temple built for rituals connected with any transitions from one condition to another: rituals of either age initiations or change of status (lodgment of power of a chief or priest).

=== Megalith №2 ===
Megalith No.2 is a cut in a rocky slope and covered by a mound stone structure oriented north–south, whose internal size is 7.5 m × 1.7 m × 3.5 m. It consists of two chambers connected by a corridor. The entrance of the southern chamber is faced to the west. It has a double portal, it could serve for penetrating sun rays.

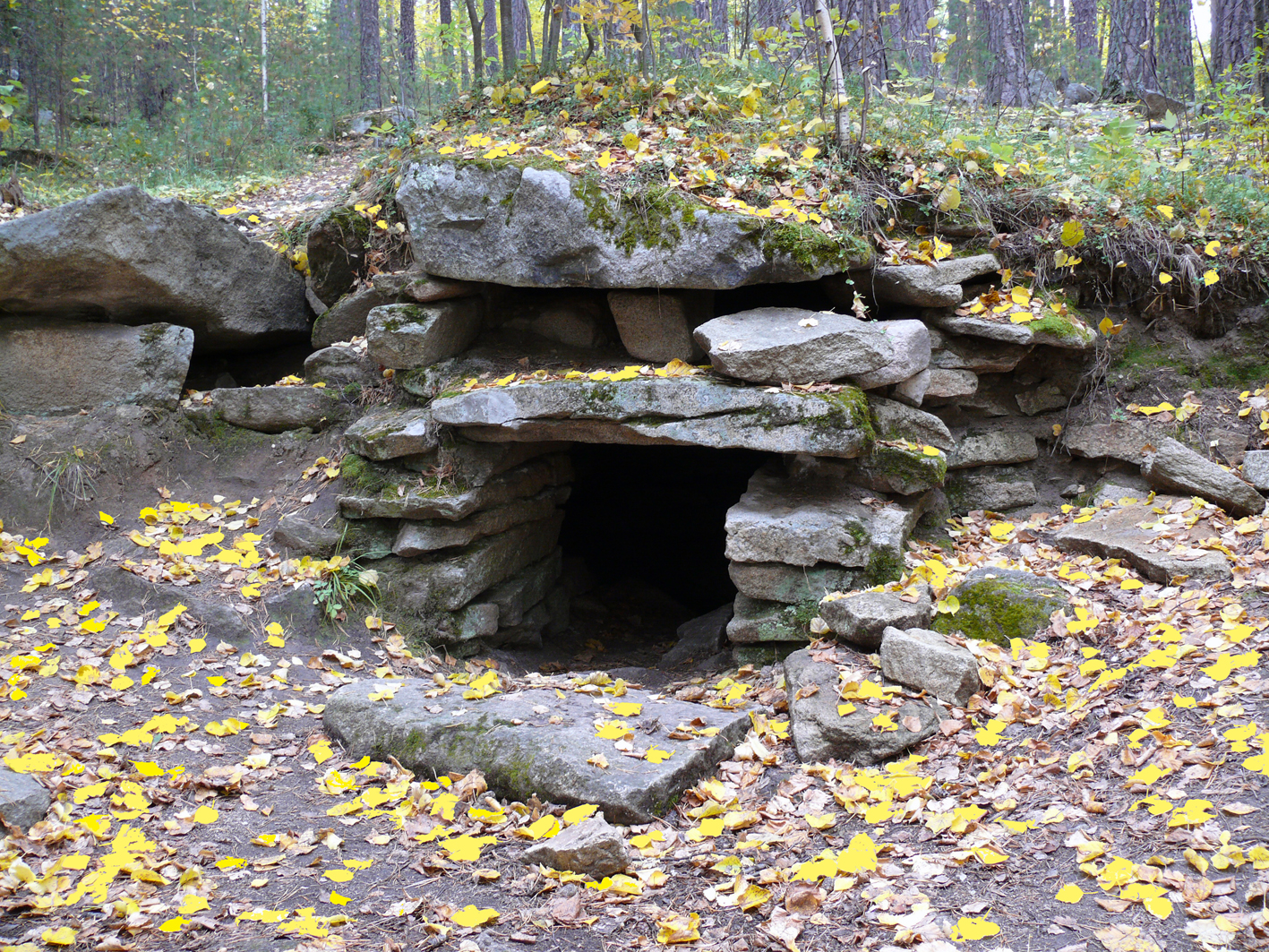
Megalith 2

=== Megalith №3 ===
One more megalithic structure (No. 3) consists of large boulders (weight of the largest of them is at least 14-15 ton). Between the boulders a square pit is situated cut in rock. Vertical stone slabs were closing both sides of the construction. Massive boulders had been prepared as capstones. In the east the complex has a mound made of broken stone, but it has been not excavated yet.

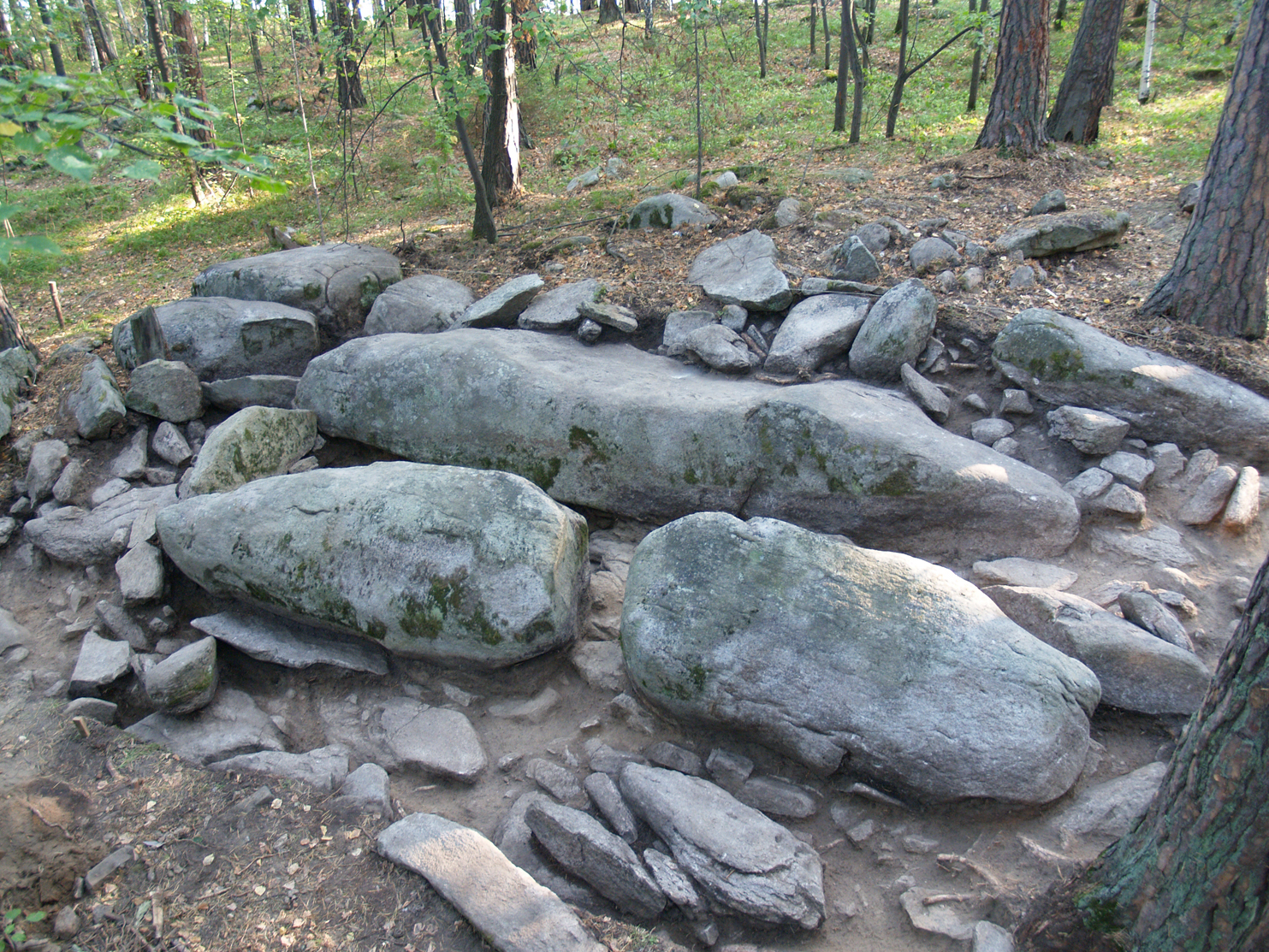
Megalith 3

=== Vera Island 9 ===
There is a cultic ritual place on the island (Vera Island 9) consisted of two menhirs whose axis line sets a direction west–east. This direction is very typical of megalithic orientations of the island. In addition to this there were two fireplaces and a large altar stone.

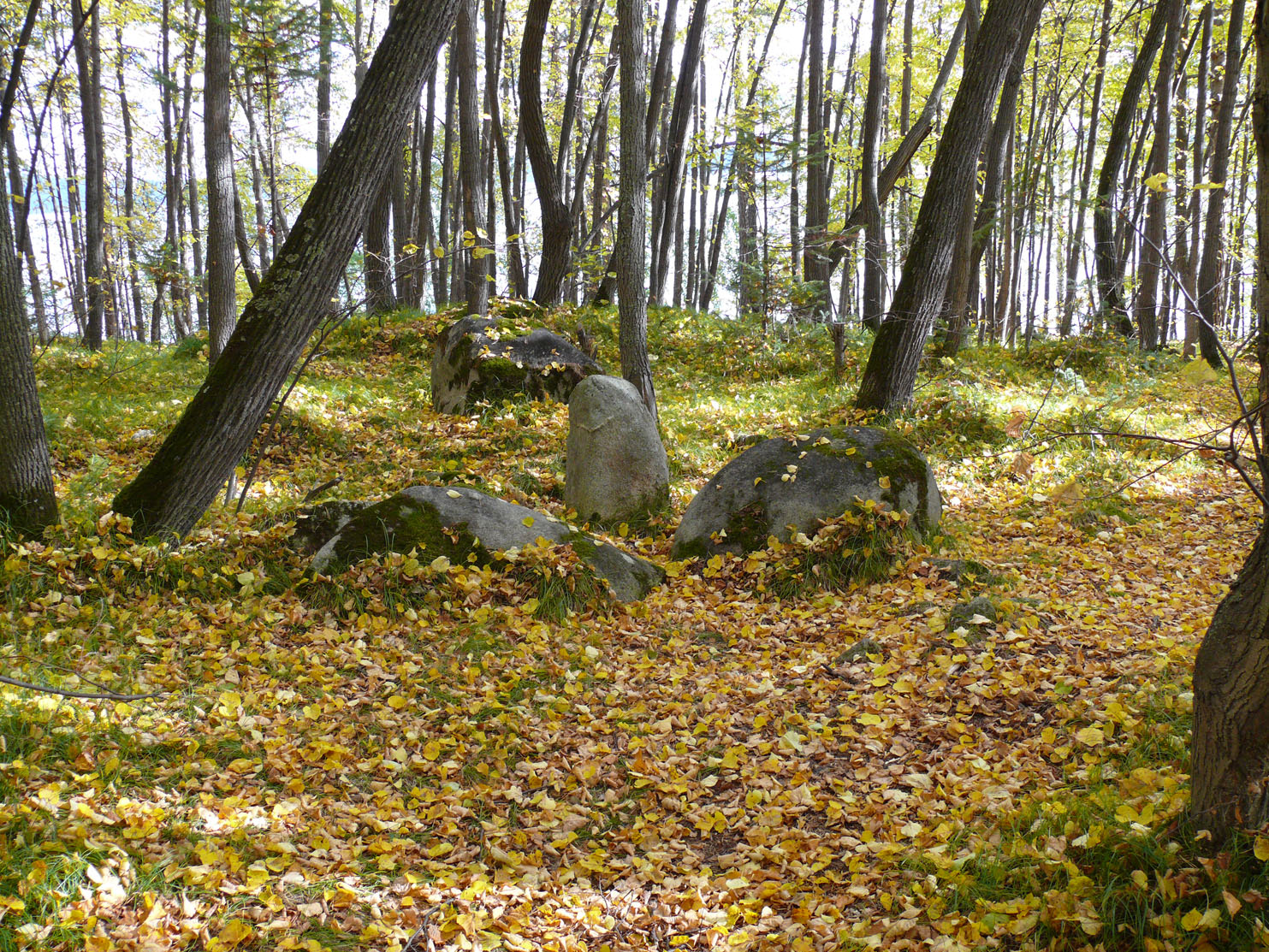
Cultic place of Vera Island 9 and the central menhir.

There is one larger menhir in the south-east. This menhir had been erected to mark a direction to the sunset in midwinter. The destination of this open-air sanctuary was rituals connected with seasonal circles.

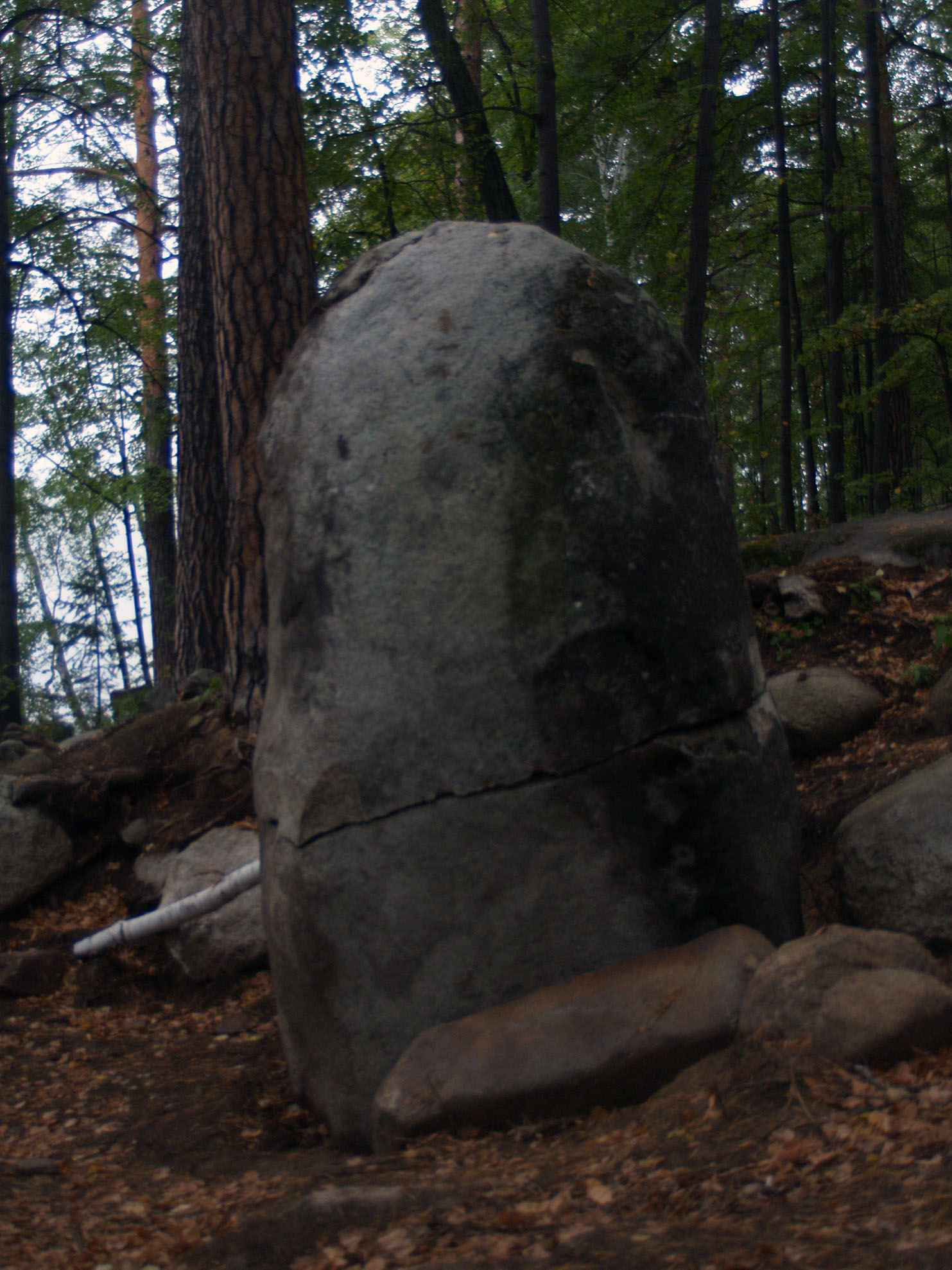
The large menhir of the cultic place Vera Island 9

=== Vera Island 4 ===
A cultic place (5.5×4 m) surrounded by vertical stones and paved with massive granite plates tightly adjusted to one another is situated on the settlements of Vera Island 4. There was a small menhir in a center of this place. The exact destination is unknown.

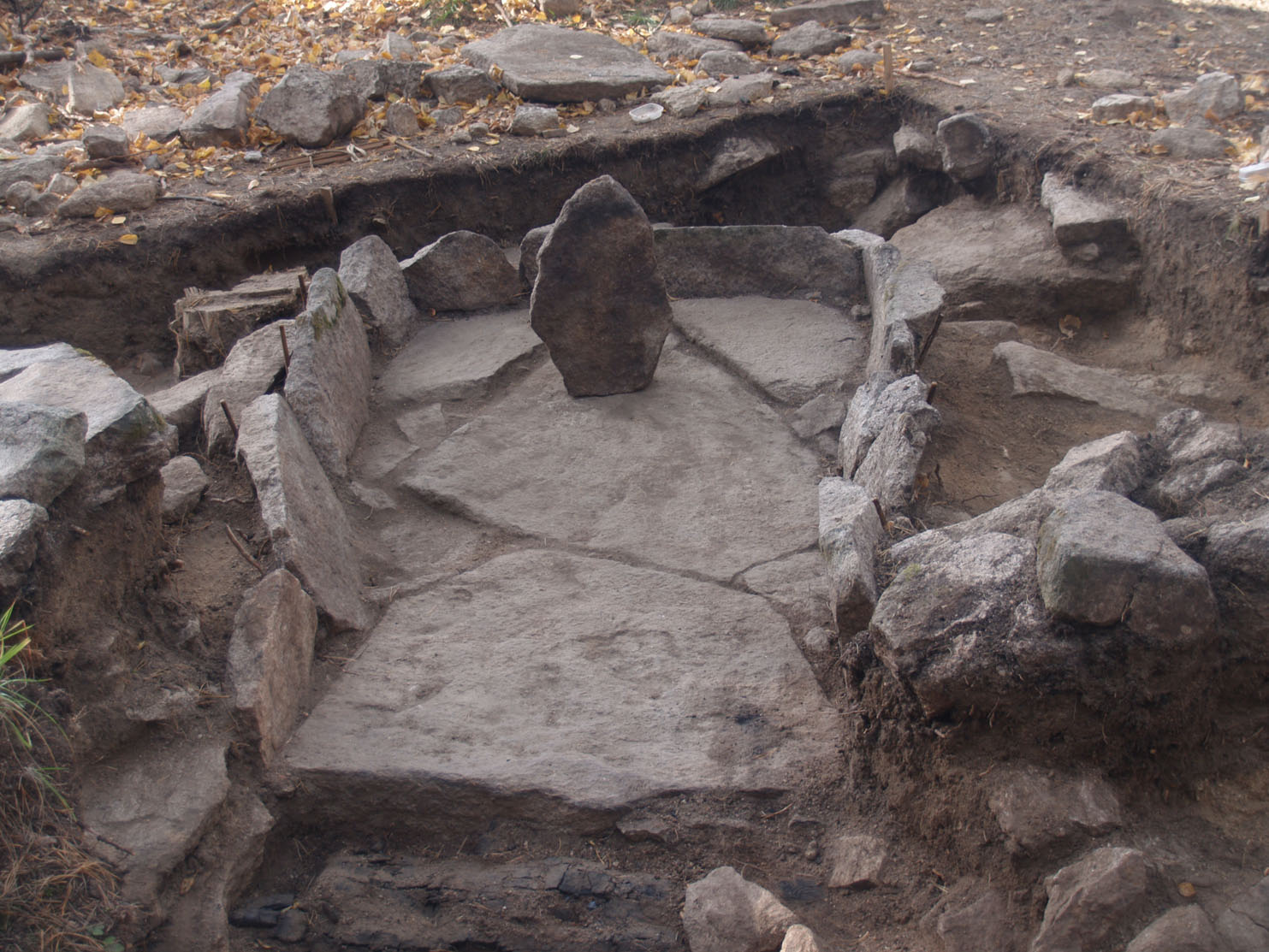
Cultic place of Vera Island 4

A quarry is a unique addition to the megalithic complex of the island. Stones of the quarry have clear traces of copper tools as well as wooden wedges. By means of these wedges and water ancient megalithic builders could cut granite and extract needed stone blocks. There are also traces of extractions of large stone plates used as megalithic capstones.

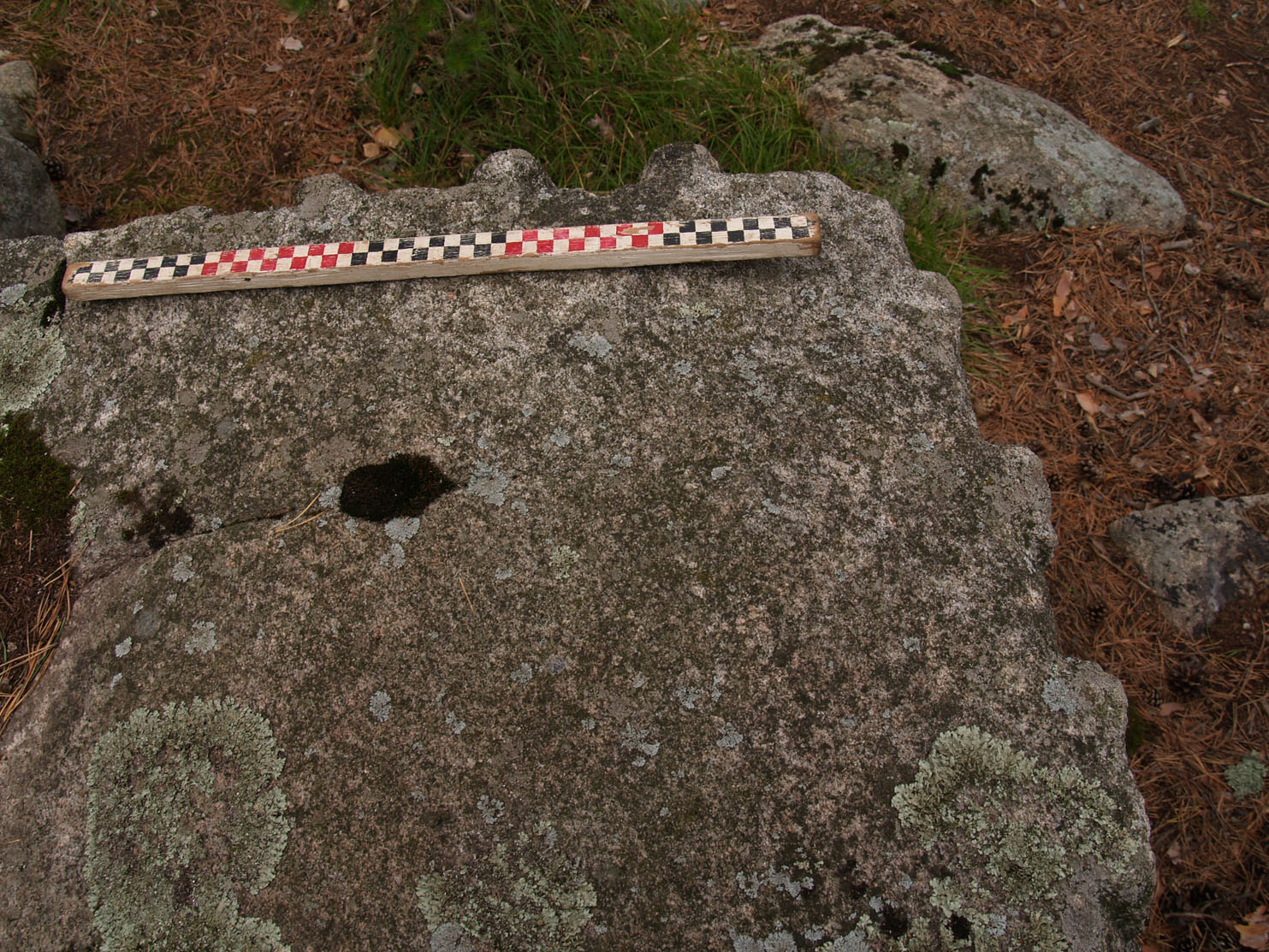
Traces of wedges on the quarry.

== Geoglyph ==
The discovery of a giant land art drawing of a moose or elk was made by Alexander Shestakov using satellite imagery and reported on in 2011 in the journal Antiquity. The geoglyph is located on the slopes of the Zyuratkul Mountains and has accurate contours of an animal similar to elk (54˚56'33" N 59˚11'32" E). Precisely under the contour on depth of 30 centimetres (12 in) to 40 centimetres (16 in) the stone laying 4.5 metres (15 ft) wide was unearthed. Its borders consisted of large stones, and the center was filled with small stones. Builders of the object cut off a soil layer up to virgin clay, and placed stones into this trench.

Now the stones are covered by a layer of patina and have a dark shade. But earlier they were light and were perfectly visible from the ridge, because the size of the drawing is huge. Its width is of 195 metres (640 ft), the length of 218 metres (715 ft), and the diagonal of 275 metres (902 ft).

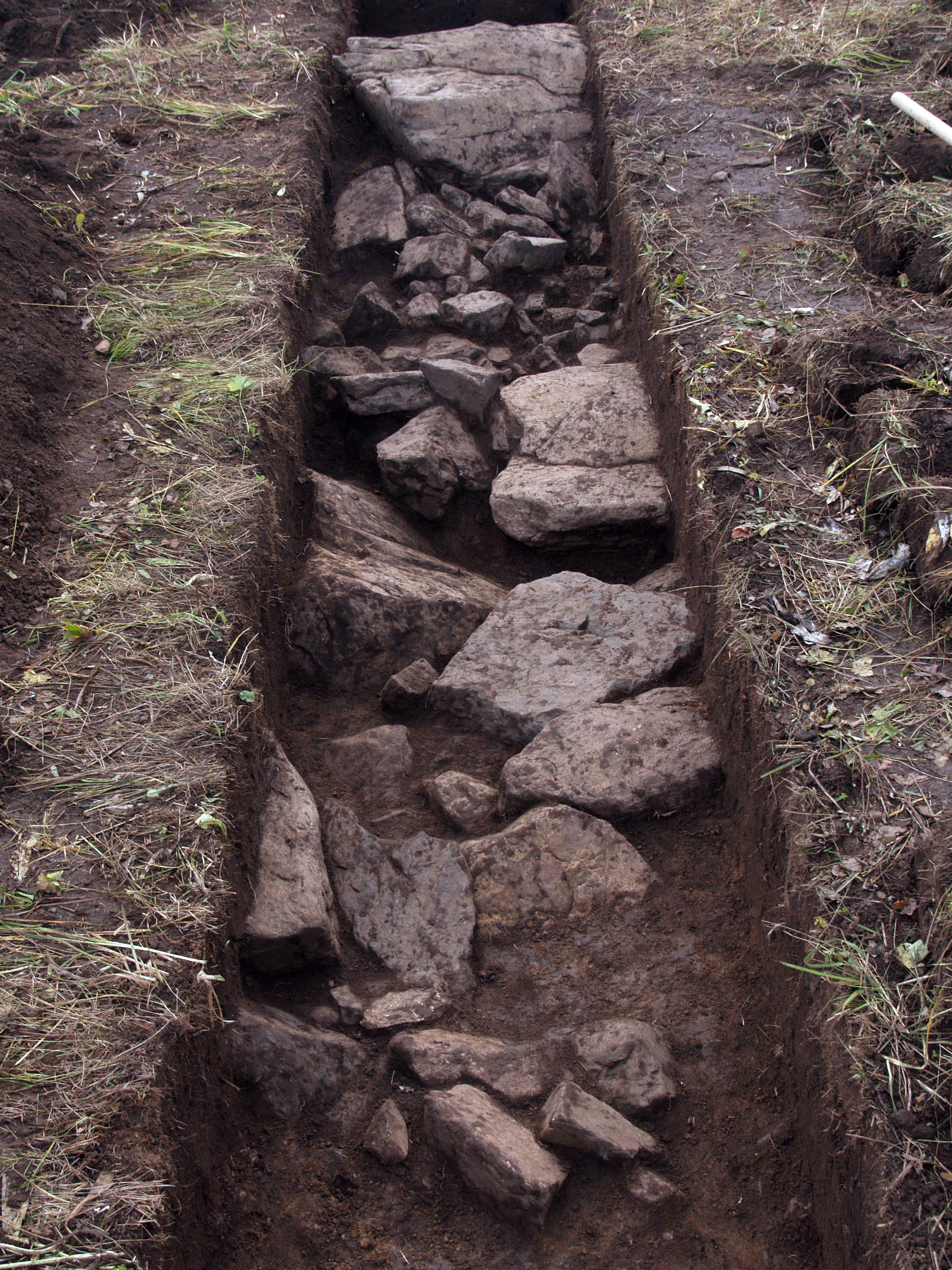
Geoglyph on the slope of the Zyuratkul. Stone structure.

It is unknown today, whether this geoglyph belongs to the period of the same megalithic culture, as megaliths of the Vera Island. Everywhere, from geoglyphs in the Nazca Lines to the Blythe geoglyphs in California and several in England it is very difficult to date them. But a very early date for this geoglyph is probable. In the period of its creation the soil layer was only 10 centimetres (3.9 in), and today it is 40 centimetres (16 in) to 50 centimetres (20 in).

In 2012, Stanislav Grigoriev from the Russian Academy of Sciences Institute of History and Archaeology has suggested that stone tools found during recent excavations show a style of Lithic reduction dating to the Neolithic or Eneolithic periods between 4000 and 2000 BCE. This suggested dating would place the construction of the 900 feet (270 m) geoglyph many centuries before that of the Nazca lines in Peru, build around 500 CE.

== See also ==
- Megaliths
- Geoglyph
