= Scrobipalpa adaptata =

Scientific classification
- Kingdom: Animalia
- Phylum: Arthropoda
- Clade: Pancrustacea
- Class: Insecta
- Order: Lepidoptera
- Family: Gelechiidae
- Genus: Scrobipalpa
- Species: S. adaptata

Binomial name
- Scrobipalpa adaptata (Povolný, 2001)

Synonyms
- Euscrobipalpa adaptata Povolný, 2001

Species of moth

Scrobipalpa adaptata is a moth of the family Gelechiidae. It is found in southern Ukraine and Russia (the southern Ural).

The wingspan is about 13 mm (0.51 in).
