= Yuryuzan, Chelyabinsk Oblast =

Yuryuzan Юрюзань
- Town
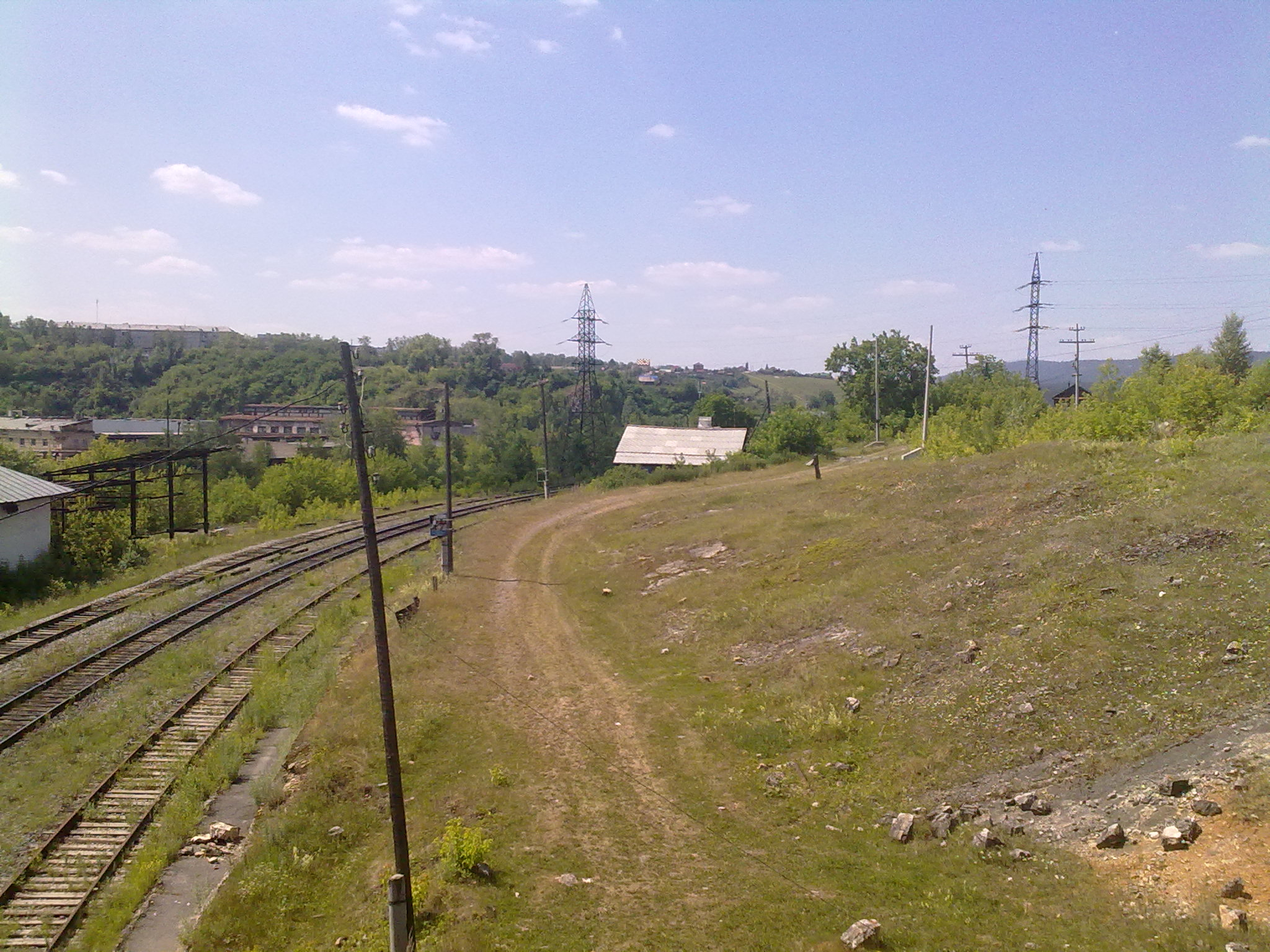
- Station in Yuryuzan

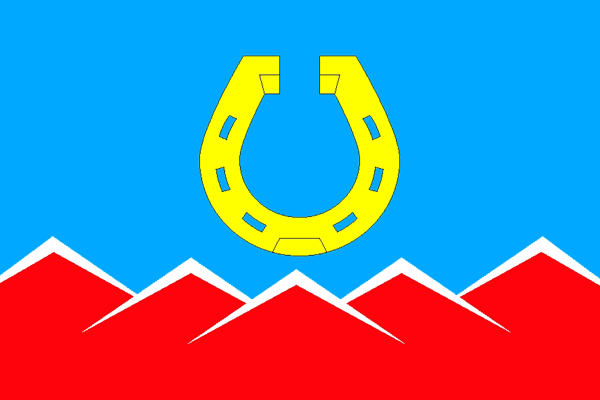
- Flag
- Interactive map of Yuryuzan
- Location of Yuryuzan Yuryuzan (Chelyabinsk Oblast)
- Coordinates: 54°52′N 58°26′E
- Country: Russia
- Federal subject: Chelyabinsk Oblast
- Administrative district: Katav-Ivanovsky District
- TownSelsoviet: Yuryuzan
- Founded: 1758
- Town status since: June 18, 1943
- Elevation: 378 m (1,240 ft)

Population (2010 Census)
  - Total: 12,571
  - Estimate (2023): 10,130 (−19.4%)

Administrative status
  - Capital of: Town of Yuryuzan

Municipal status
  - Municipal district: Katav-Ivanovsky Municipal District
  - Urban settlement: Yuryuzanskoye Urban Settlement
  - Capital of: Yuryuzanskoye Urban Settlement
- Time zone: UTC+5 (MSK+2)
- Postal code: 456120–456122
- OKTMO ID: 75629116001
- Website: www.yuryuzan.ru

Yuryuzan (Russian: Юрюза́нь) is a town in Katav-Ivanovsky District of Chelyabinsk Oblast, Russia, located on the Yuryuzan River (left tributary of the Ufa River), 254 kilometers (158 mi) from Chelyabinsk, the administrative center of the oblast. Population: 12,571 (2010 census); 14,158 (2002 census); 18,294 (1989 Soviet census).

== History ==
It was established in 1758 as the settlement of Yuryuzan-Ivanovsky Zavod (Юрюза́нь-Ива́новский Заво́д) to support the construction of an ironworks. Since the end of the 19th century, the settlement is known as Yuryuzansky Zavod (Юрюза́нский Заво́д). It was granted town status and renamed Yuryuzan on June 18, 1943.

== Administrative and municipal status ==
Within the framework of administrative divisions, it is, together with one rural locality (the village of Pervukha), incorporated within Katav-Ivanovsky District as the Town of Yuryuzan. As a municipal division, the Town of Yuryuzan is incorporated within Katav-Ivanovsky Municipal District as Yuryuzanskoye Urban Settlement.

== Economy ==
Town economy centers around a large plant which produces refrigerators.
