= Nurgush =

Mountain range in Russia

- Нургуш / Нөргөш
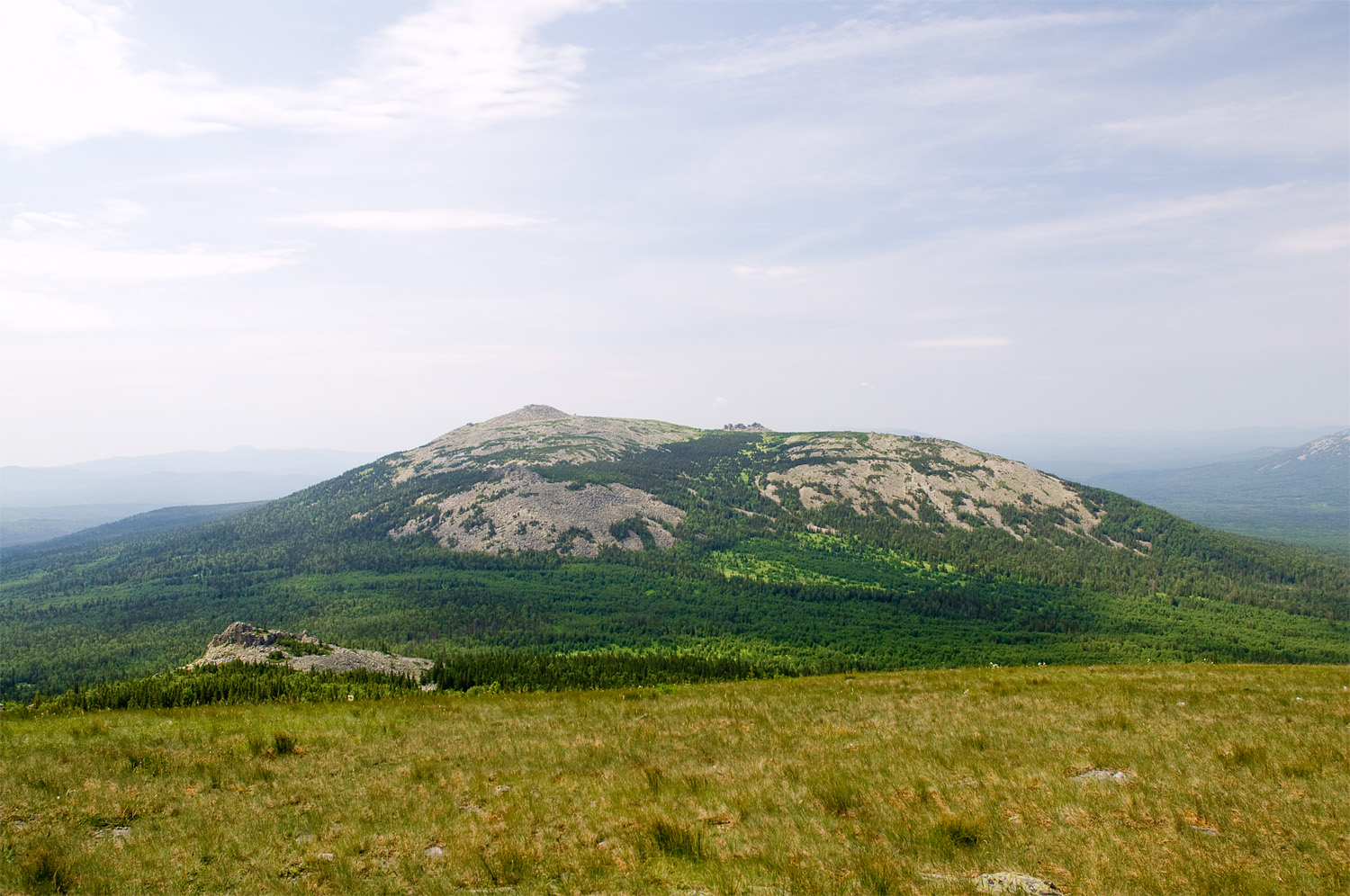
- View of the Middle Nurgush.

Highest point
- Peak: HP of Bolshoy Nurgush
- Elevation: 1,406 m (4,613 ft)
- Coordinates: 54°49′11″N 59°08′57″E

Dimensions
- Length: 50 km (31 mi) SSW / NNE

Geography
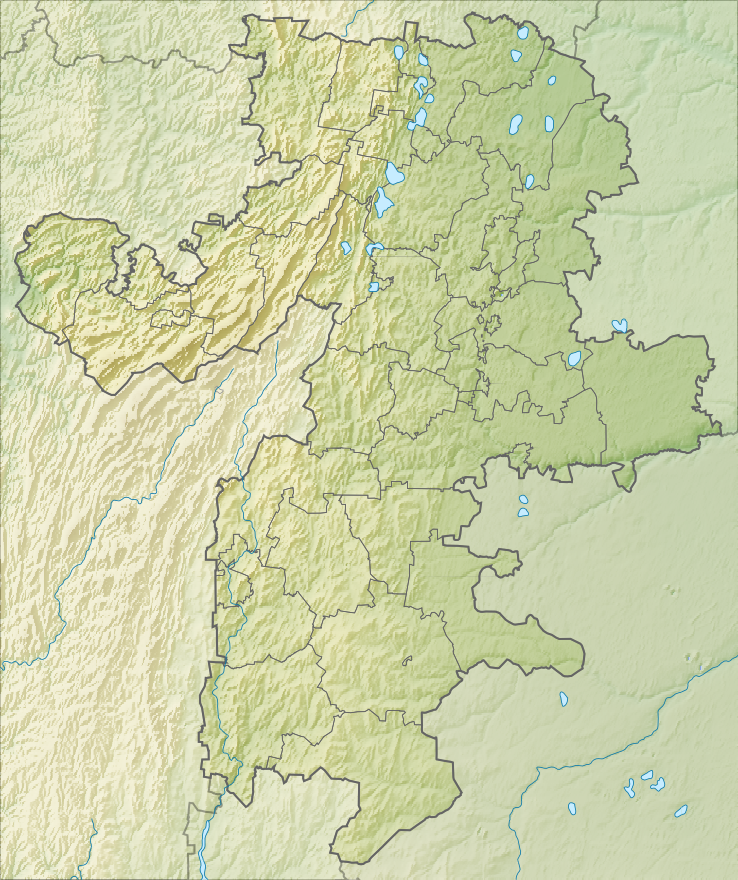
- Location within Chelyabinsk Oblast Location within Russia
- Country: Russia
- Federal subject: Chelyabinsk Oblast
- Range coordinates: 54°45′N 59°0′E
- Parent range: Southern Ural; Ural Mountains

Geology
- Rock age: Carboniferous
- Rock type: Quartzite

Climbing
- Easiest route: From Bakal, Russia

Nurgush (Russian: Нургуш; Bashkir: Нөргөш) is a mountain range in Satkinsky District, in the western part of Chelyabinsk Oblast, Russia. The range is within the 882.49 square kilometres (340.73 sq mi) protected area of the Zyuratkul National Park.

The name of the mountain in the Bashkir language means "luminous bird".

== Geography ==
Nurgush is a subrange of the Urals. It stretches roughly from SSW to NNE for 50 kilometres (31 mi) in the southern section of the long Ural chain. The range stretches between the southern shore of lake Zyuratkul to the mouth of river Berezyak. The highest point is 1,406 metres (4,613 ft) high, rising in the Bolshoy Nurgush section located in the northern part. Maly Nurgush is the southern section. The southwestern limit of the range is marked by the valley of river Yuryuzan.

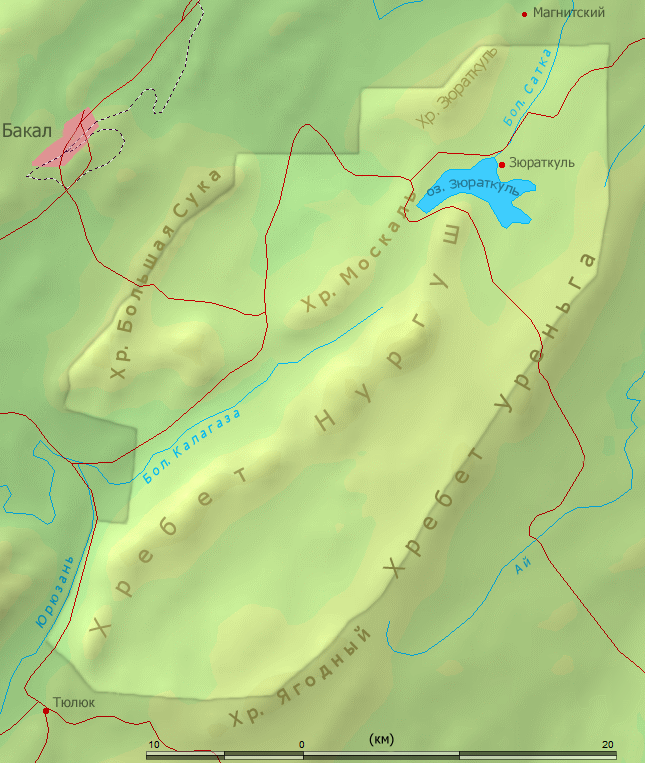
Map of the range area.

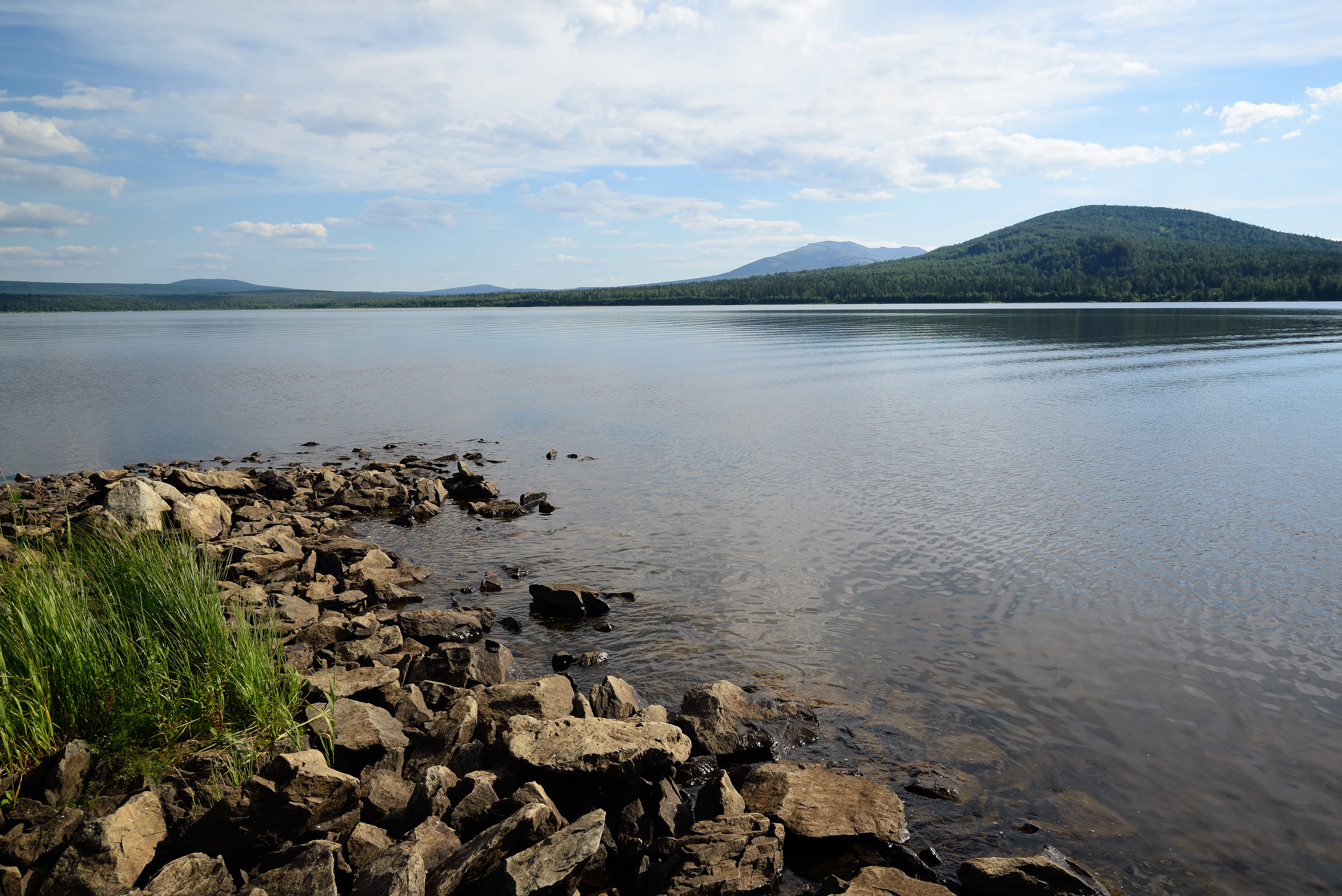
View of the Nurgush from the shore of lake Zyuratkul.

== Flora ==
The lower slopes of the Nurgush are partly covered with dark coniferous taiga; there is mixed spruce, fir and birch forest in the valleys. The higher elevations have often a barren look with kurums and mountain tundra.

== See also ==
- List of highest points of Russian federal subjects
- List of mountains and hills of Russia
