= Katav-Ivanovsk =

Katav-Ivanovsk Катав-Ивановск
- Town
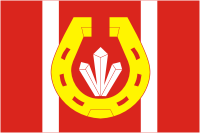
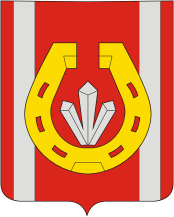
- Flag Coat of arms
- Interactive map of Katav-Ivanovsk
- Location of Katav-Ivanovsk Katav-Ivanovsk (Chelyabinsk Oblast)
- Coordinates: 54°45′N 58°13′E
- Country: Russia
- Federal subject: Chelyabinsk Oblast
- Administrative district: Katav-Ivanovsky District
- TownSelsoviet: Katav-Ivanovsk
- Founded: 1755
- Town status since: August 27, 1939

Population (2010 Census)
  - Total: 17,630
  - Estimate (2025): 14,025 (−20.4%)

Administrative status
  - Capital of: Katav-Ivanovsky District, Town of Katav-Ivanovsk

Municipal status
  - Municipal district: Katav-Ivanovsky Municipal District
  - Urban settlement: Katav-Ivanovskoye Urban Settlement
  - Capital of: Katav-Ivanovsky Municipal District, Katav-Ivanovskoye Urban Settlement
- Time zone: UTC+5 (MSK+2)
- Postal code: 456110–456113
- OKTMO ID: 75629101001
- Website: www.katavivan.ru/taxonomy/term/1

Katav-Ivanovsk (Russian: Ката́в-Ива́новск) is a town and the administrative center of Katav-Ivanovsky District in Chelyabinsk Oblast, Russia, located on the Katav River (left tributary of the Yuryuzan), 321 kilometers (199 mi) southwest of Chelyabinsk, the administrative center of the oblast. Population: 17,630 (2010 census); 20,162 (2002 census); 24,972 (1989 Soviet census).

== History ==
It was founded in 1755 as a settlement around an iron-smelting plant. Town status was granted to it on August 27, 1939.

== Administrative and municipal status ==
Within the framework of administrative divisions, Katav-Ivanovsk serves as the administrative center of Katav-Ivanovsky District. As an administrative division, it is, together with two rural localities, incorporated within Katav-Ivanovsky District as the Town of Katav-Ivanovsk. As a municipal division, the Town of Katav-Ivanovsk is incorporated within Katav-Ivanovsky Municipal District as Katav-Ivanovskoye Urban Settlement.
