= Uraltau range =

Mountain range in Russia

The Uraltau range

Highest point
- Peak: Arvakryaz
- Elevation: 1,068 m (3,504 ft)

Dimensions
- Length: 290 km (180 mi)
- Width: 10–20 km (6.2–12.4 mi)

Geography
- Country: Russia

Geology
- Rock age: Carboniferous

The Uraltau range (Russian: хребет Уралтау; Bashkir: Уралтау һырты) is a mountain range that runs in the Southern Ural from the Baymaksky District to the Zlatoust.

== See also ==
- Idel-Ural State
