= Ay (river) =

River in Bashkiria and Chelyabinsk Oblast, Russia

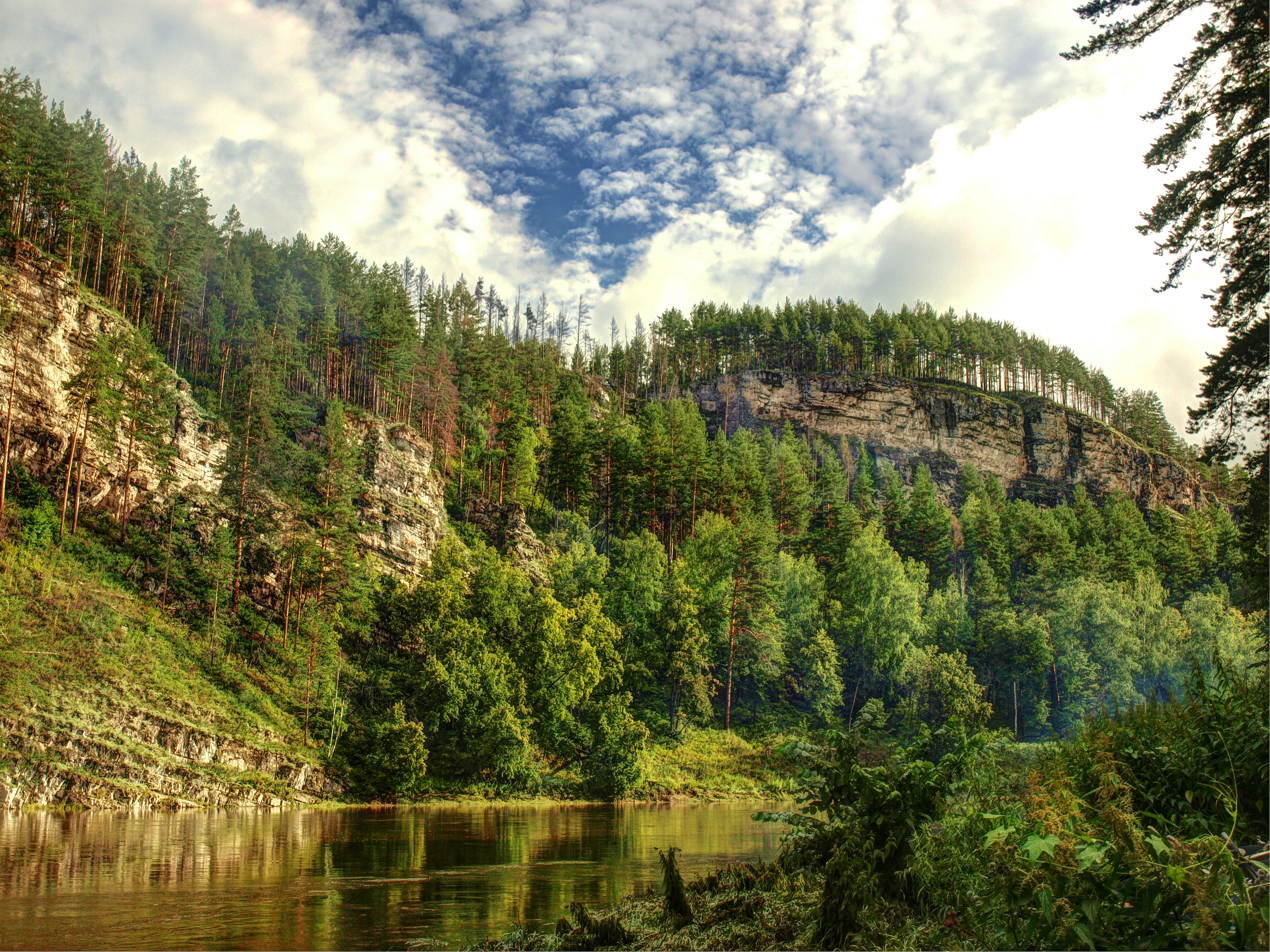
- View from the bank of the river
- Etymology: "month" or "moon" in Bashkir language
- Native name: Әй (Bashkir)

Location
- Country: Russia
- Oblasts: Chelyabinsk Oblast, Republic of Bashkortostan
- Cities: Zlatoust, Kusa

Physical characteristics
- Source
  - location: Uraltau range
- Mouth: Ufa
  - coordinates: 54°39′11″N 59°06′41″E
  - elevation: 525 ft
- Length: 549 km (341 mi)
- Basin size: 15,000 km^{2} (5,800 sq mi)

Basin features
- Progression: Ufa→ Belaya→ Kama→ Volga→ Caspian Sea

The Ay (Bashkir: Әй, Äy; Russian: Ай) is a river in Bashkortostan and Chelyabinsk Oblast in Russia, a left tributary of the Ufa. The river is 549 kilometres (341 mi) long, and its drainage basin covers 15,000 square kilometres (5,800 mi^{2}). The Ay freezes up in late October or early November and remains icebound until mid-April. The cities of Zlatoust and Kusa are along the river Ay. There are many steep cliff sides and caves along the banks of the river. The current of the Ay has been used for generating hydroelectric power. It is also possible to fish for pike, bleak, and carp, to name a few species.

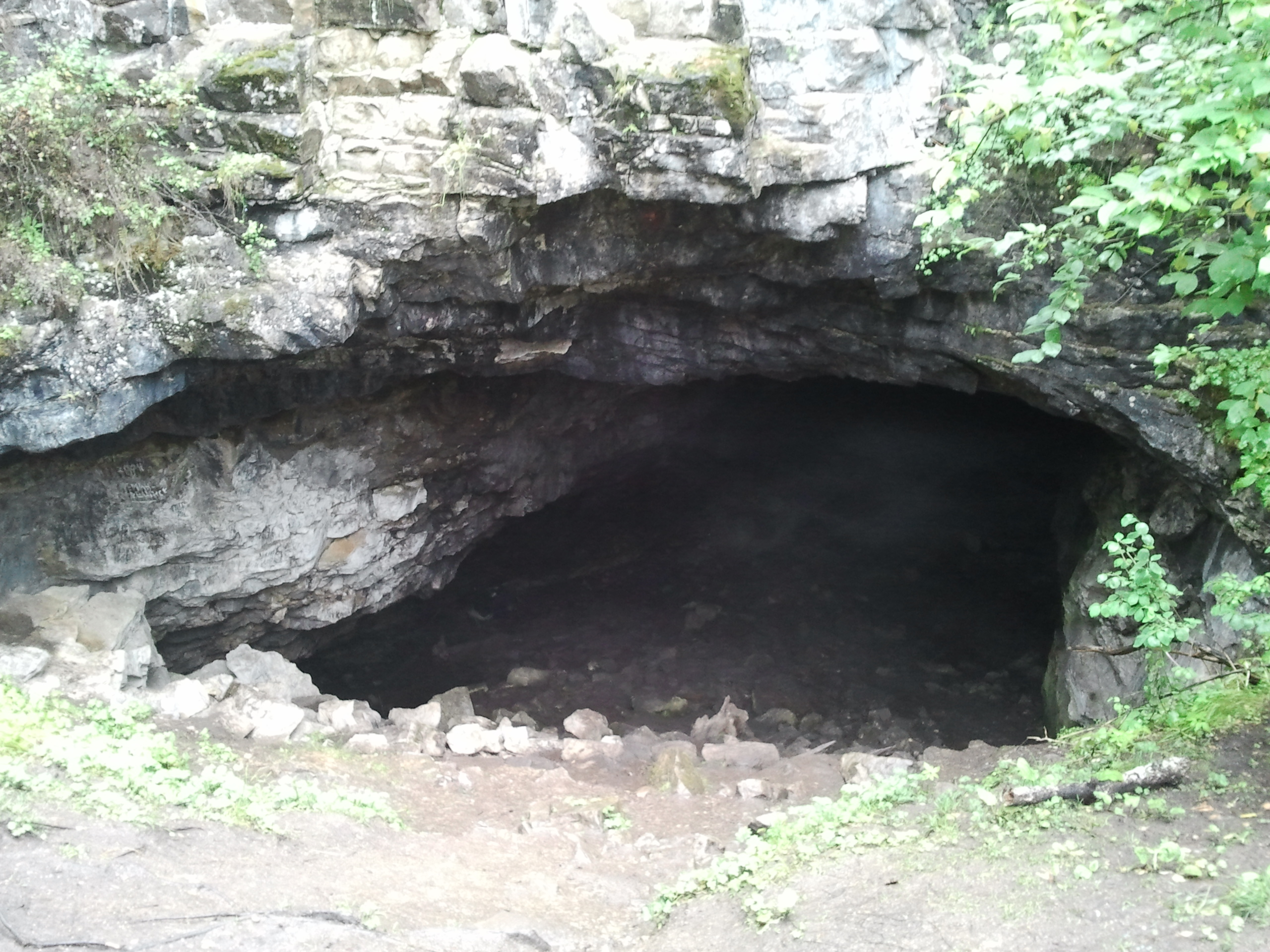
Kurgazak Cave near the banks of the river Ay

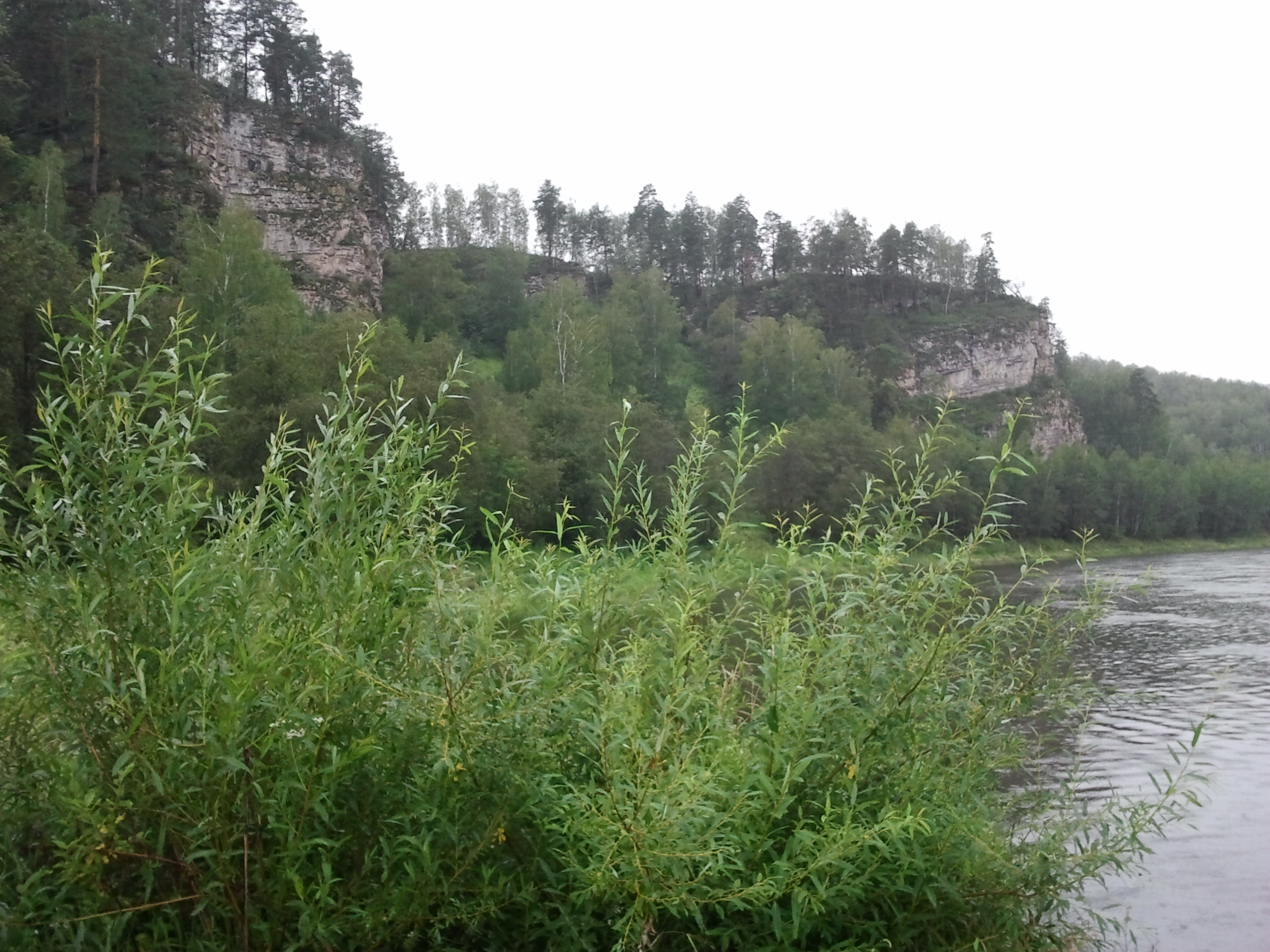
Rocky ledge near the river Ay
