= Zyuratkul National Park =

National park in Russia

- Зюраткуль (национальный парк)
- IUCN category II (national park)
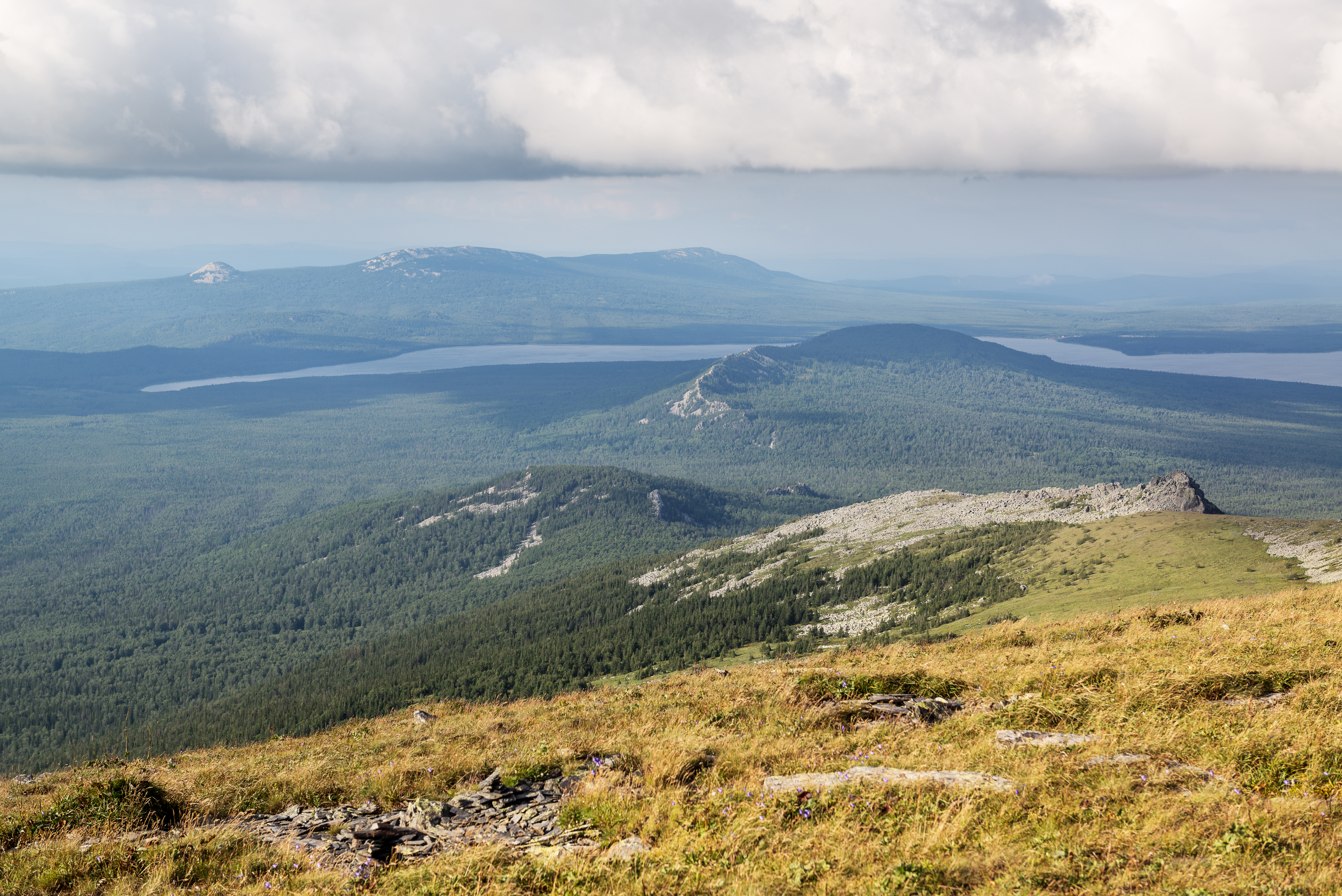

- Location within Russia
- Location: Chelyabinsk Oblast, Russia
- Coordinates: 54°50′56″N 58°56′26″E
- Area: 882.49 km^{2} (340.73 sq mi)
- Established: 1993

Zyuratkul National Park (Russian: Зюраткуль (национальный парк)) is a Russian national park established in 1993 in the southern part of Satkinsky Raion (Chelyabinsk Oblast, Urals). The park lies about 30 km south of Satka and 200 km west of Chelyabinsk.

== Description ==
Notable features include Zyuratkul lake, a rare mountainous body of water for the Urals 754 m above sea level, with a surface area of 13,2 km^{2} and a maximum depth of 8 m. Water is slightly mineralised (≈50 mg/L). Because of its clear water and spectacular landscape around, Zyuratkul' is often called "Ural Ritsa".

Also remarkable is a number of mountain ranges, among them Zyuratkul' range (8 km in length, rising 1175 m in its highest point). Another range, Nurgush, is the highest point of Chelyabinsk Oblast with a height of 1406 m.

== See also ==
- Southern Ural
- Zyuratkul Geoglyph
