= Kurgazak Cave =

Cave in the Chelyabinsk oblast, Russia

- Кургазакская пещера (Russian)
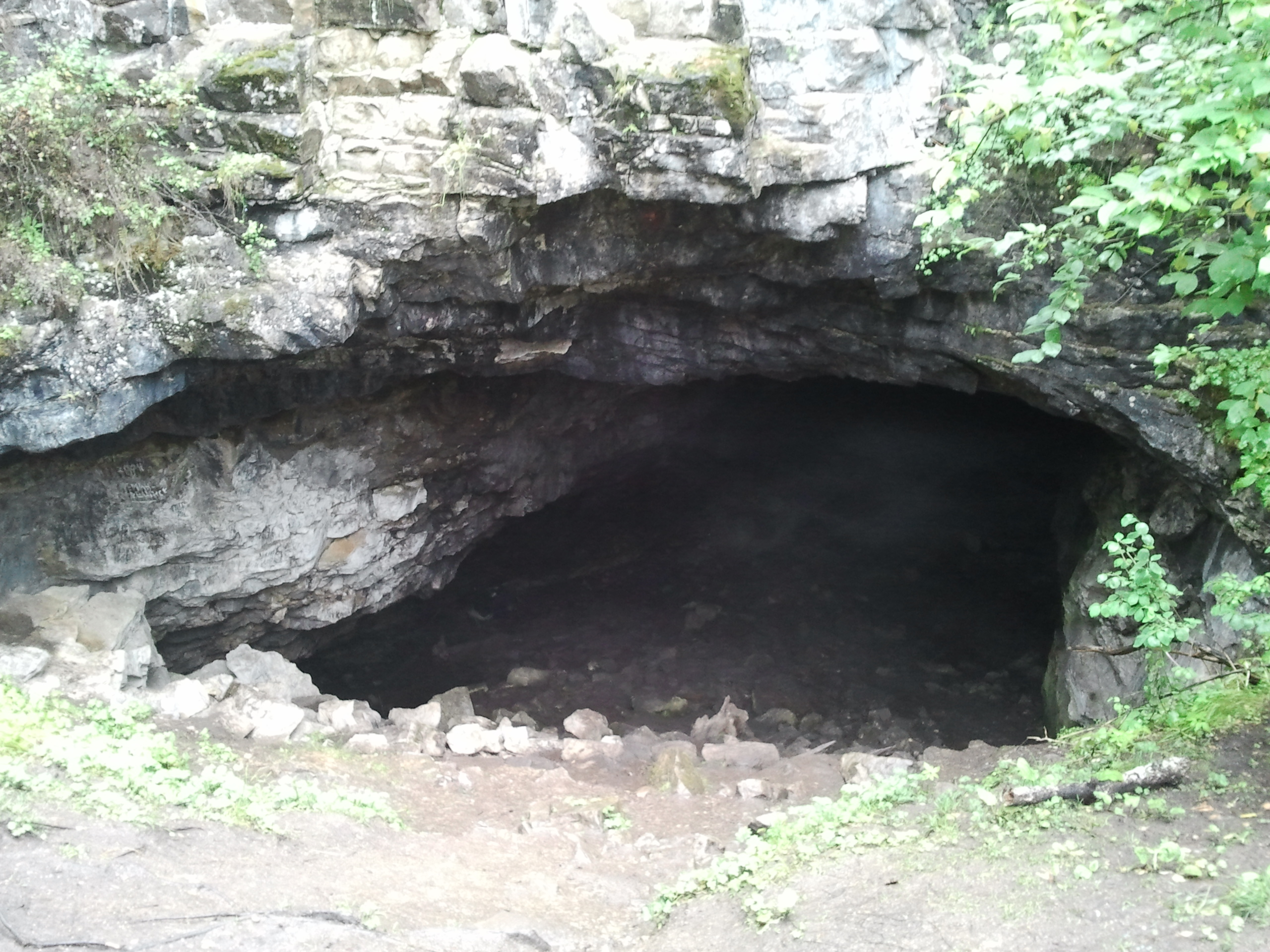
- Interactive map of Kurgazak Cave
- 55°08′19″N 58°43′34″E
- Type: karst and limestone cave
- Location: Chelyabinsk oblast, Russia

Site notes
- Height: 20 m (66 ft)
- Length: 530 m (1,739 ft)
- Excavation dates: 18th century
- Archaeologists: Peter Simon Pallas

Kurgazak Cave (Russian: Кургазакская пещера) is a cave in the Ural Mountains, in the Ay River valley. Located in the Chelyabinsk oblast, Russia, and between the villages Mezhevoy Alexeevka is a natural monument. The first mention of the cave belongs to the second half of the 18th century, when it was described by Peter Simon Pallas academician.

The cave entrance is located at an altitude of about 20 meters, 150 meters from the Ay River. Length - 530 m, depth - 16 m. The cave is formed in the Devonian strata of limestone and karst cavity represents the main-corridor-type, consisting of three large halls interconnected passageways.

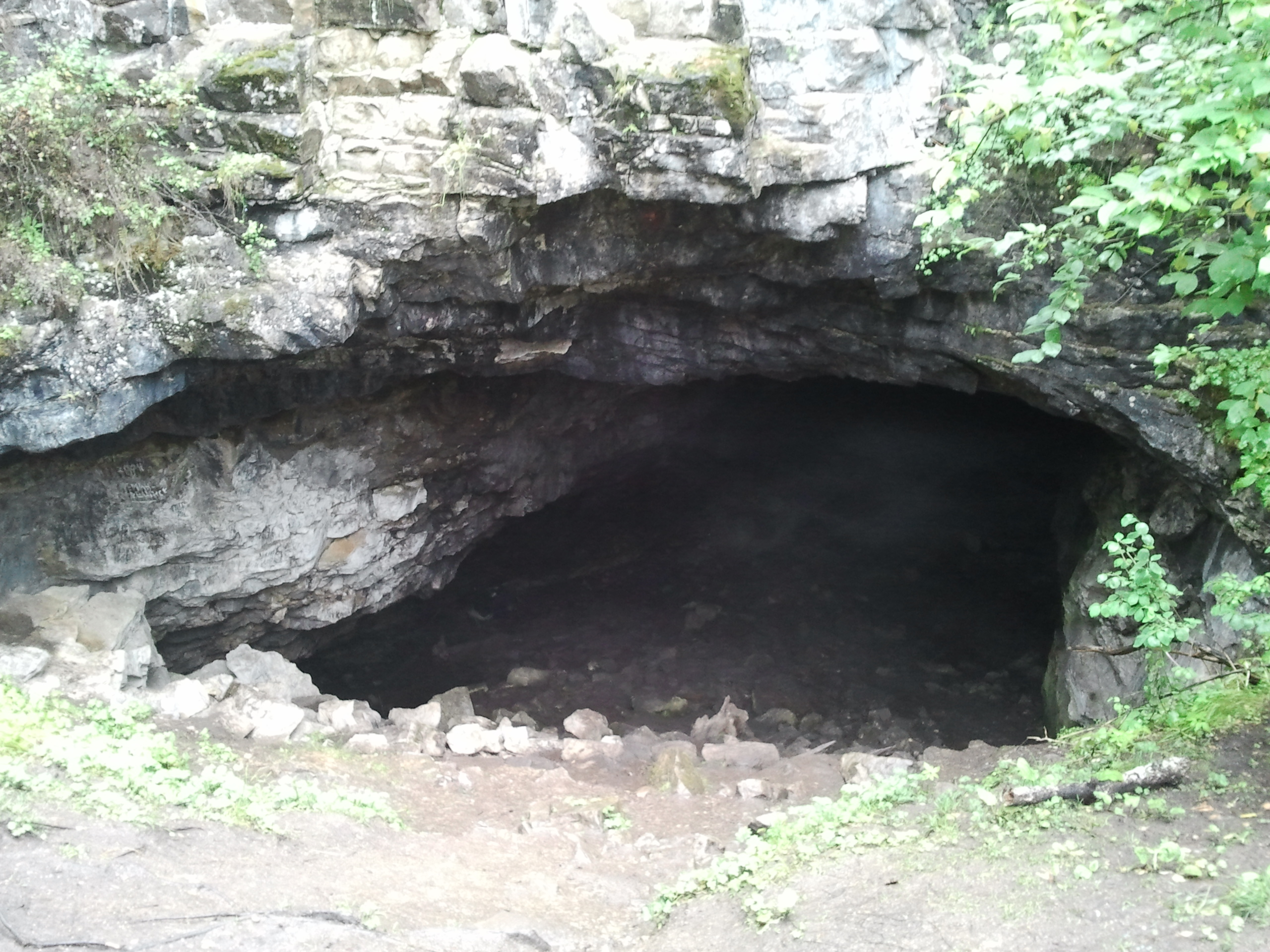
Kurgazak Cave

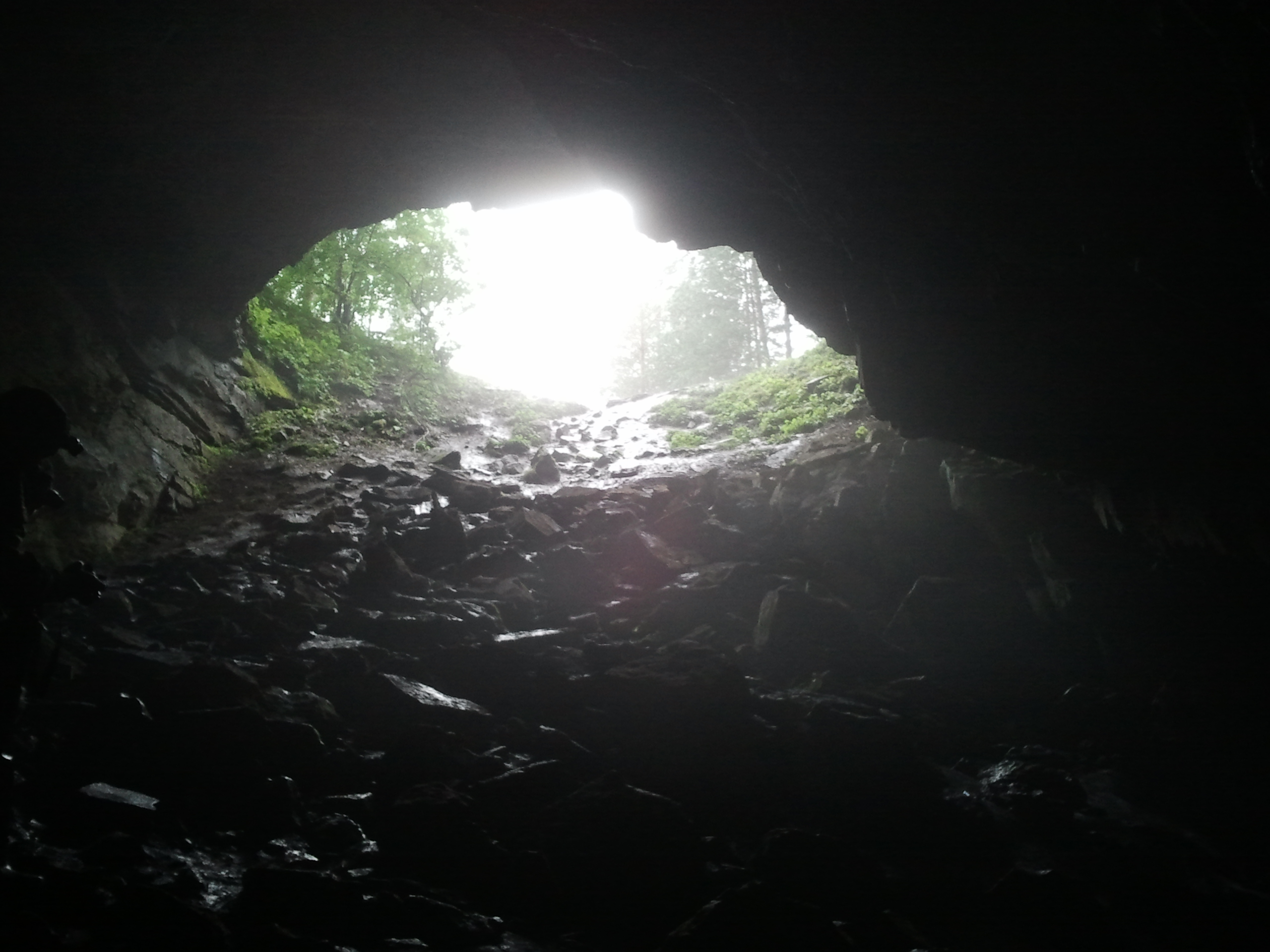
Inside the Kurgazak Cave
