= Yuryuzan (river) =

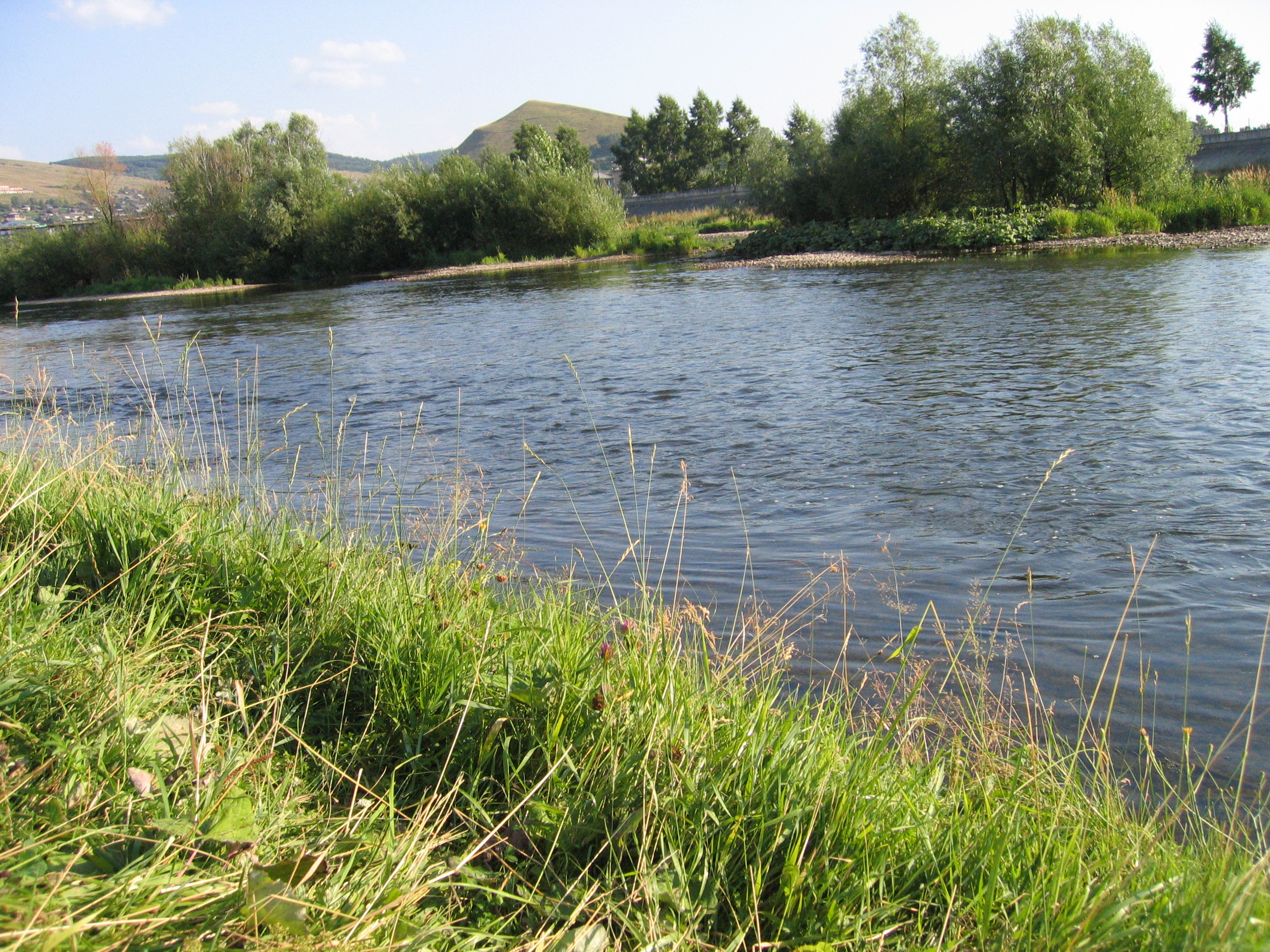
- Yuryuzan river near Ust-Katav in Chelyabinsk Oblast.

Location
- Country: Russia

Physical characteristics
- Source
  - location: Yamantau, South Urals
  - coordinates: 54°17′39″N 58°14′28″E
  - elevation: 960 m (3,150 ft)
- Mouth: Pavlovskoye Reservoir
  - coordinates: 55°42′20″N 56°58′15″E
  - elevation: 140 m (460 ft)
- Length: 404 km (251 mi)
- Basin size: 7,240 km^{2} (2,800 sq mi)
- Discharge
  - average: 55 m^{3}/s (1,900 cu ft/s)

Basin features
- Progression: Ufa→ Belaya→ Kama→ Volga→ Caspian Sea

The Yuryuzan (/jʊərjuˈzɑːn/; Russian: Юрюзань; Bashkir: Йүрүҙән, romanized: Yürüźən) is a river in the Republic of Bashkortostan and Chelyabinsk Oblast in Russia, a left tributary of the Ufa (Kama basin). The length of the river is 404 kilometers (251 mi). The area of its basin is 7,240 square kilometers (2,800 sq mi).

The name of the river originates from the Bashkir language and means "The big river".

== Course ==
The Yuryuzan has its sources in the slopes of Mount Yamantau in the Ural Mountains. Its valley marks the southwestern limit of the Nurgush mountain range. Finally it flows into the Pavlovskoye Reservoir near Karaidel. It freezes up in the second half of October – early December and stays icebound until April. The river is navigable within the first 16 kilometers (9.9 mi) of its estuary. The towns of Yuryuzan and Ust-Katav are located on the river Yuryuzan. The Yuryuzan is very popular river for easy rafting.
