= Polovinka, Irkutsk Oblast =

Polovinka Половинка
- Village
- Location within Irkutsk Oblast Location within Russia
- Coordinates: 53°07′N 105°38′E
- Country: Russia
- Region: Irkutsk Oblast
- District: Bayandayevsky District
- Time zone: UTC+8:00

Polovinka (Russian: Половинка) is a rural locality (a selo) in Bayandayevsky District, Irkutsk Oblast, Russia. Population: 412 (2010 census);

== Geography ==
This rural locality is located 13 kilometres (8.1 mi) from Bayanday (the district's administrative centre), 131 kilometres (81 mi) from Irkutsk (capital of Irkutsk Oblast) and 4,548 kilometres (2,826 mi) from Moscow. Zangut is the nearest rural locality.
