= Russian geoglyph =

Geoglyph in Chelyabinsk Oblast, Russia

Russian Geoglyph
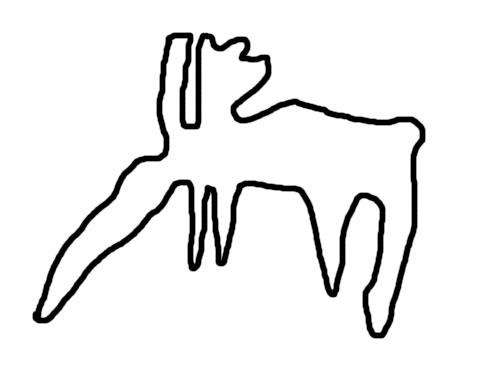
- Outline of the Russian geoglyph

- Location within Russia
- 54.9425°N 59.1922°E
- Type: Geoglyph
- Periods: Neolithic, Eneolithic
- Location: slopes of the Zyuratkul Mountains, Chelyabinsk region

Site notes
- Material: Stone
- Excavation dates: 2011-2012
- Archaeologists: Stanislav Grigoriev
- Public access: Yes

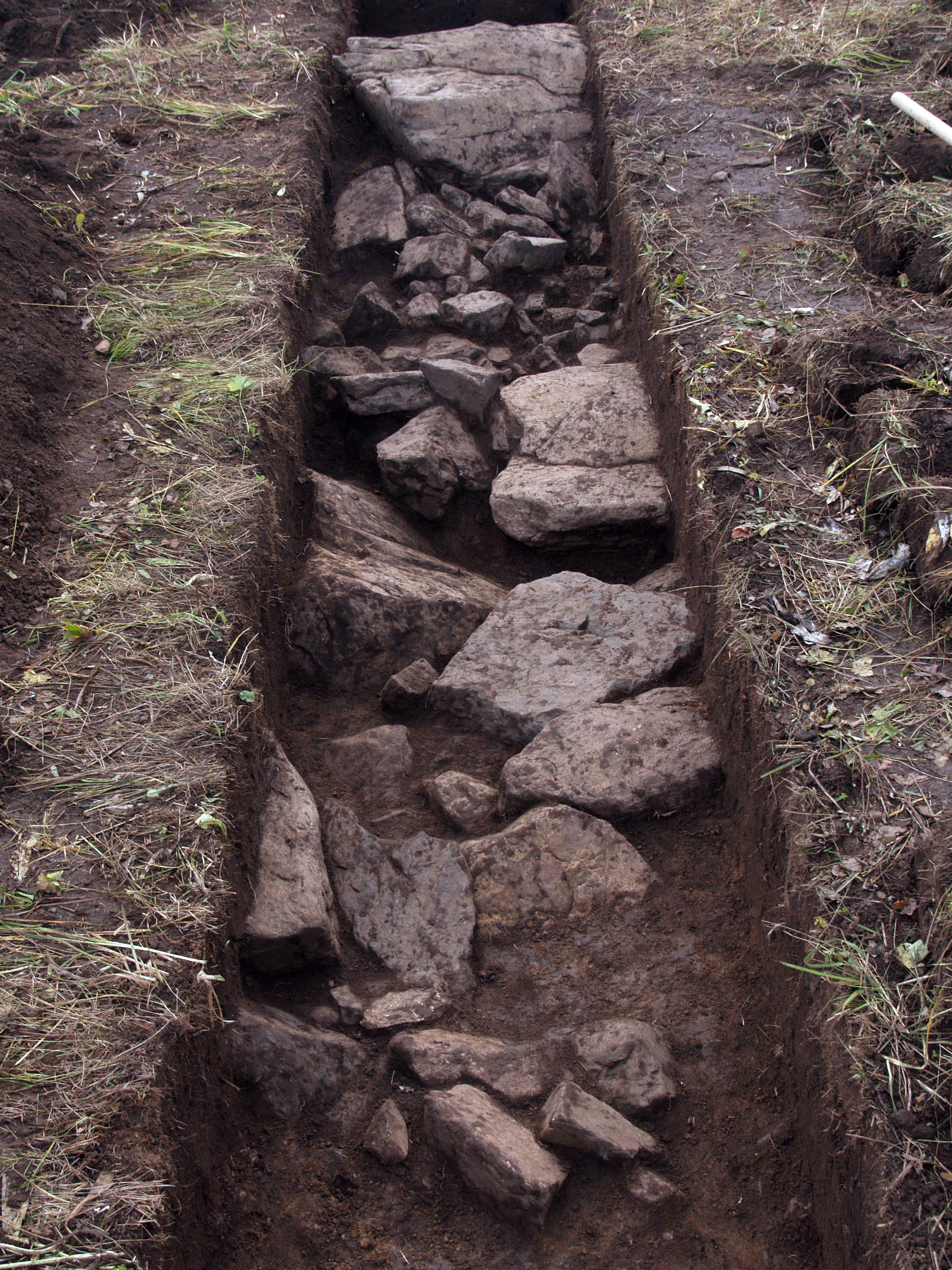
Geoglyph on the slope of the Zyuratkul. Stone structure.

The Russian geoglyph refers to a geoglyph on slopes of the Zyuratkul Mountains in the Chelyabinsk region in Russia.

== Description and discovery ==
The geoglyph depicts accurate contours of an animal similar to an elk or moose, with four legs, two antlers and a long snout. It may also have had a tail, though this has now been obscured. It was first detected in 2011 by Alexander Shestakov using satellite imagery. He notified researchers who surveyed the outline using a paraglider and seaplane. Research has continued into the site under Stanislav Grigoriev from the Russian Academy of Sciences Institute of History and Archaeology. Grigoriev published an article with Nikolai Menshenin from the State Centre for Monument Protection about the discovery in the Antiquity journal in spring 2011.

== Excavation ==
Excavations have unearthed stones laying 4.5 metres (15 ft) wide, precisely under the contour at a depth of 30 centimetres (12 in) to 40 centimetres (16 in). The borders consist of large stones with a center filled with smaller ones. Builders of the object cut off a soil layer down to virgin clay and placed stones into this trench.

The stones are now covered by a layer of patina with a dark shade. Earlier they were lighter and were perfectly visible from the ridge because the huge size of the drawing. It has a width of 195 metres (640 ft), length of 218 metres (715 ft), and a diagonal of 275 metres (902 ft). Excavations in the summer of 2012 have revealed small walls and remains of what are thought to be passageways on the areas around the hoof and snout of the animal. Grigoriev remarked that "the hoof is made of small crushed stones and clay. It seems to me there were very low walls and narrow passages among them. The same situation in the area of a muzzle: crushed stones and clay, four small broad walls and three passages." The geolyph is thought to have been created by a "megalithic culture" operating in the area during the past and connected with other Megaliths in the Urals and on Vera Island. In the period of its creation the soil layer was only 10 centimetres (3.9 in), and today it is 40 centimetres (16 in) to 50 centimetres (20 in).

== Dating ==
Grigoriev has found over forty stone tools resembling pickaxes during recent excavations that Grigoriev suggests show a style of Lithic reduction dating to the Neolithic or Chalcolithic periods between 4000 and 2000 BCE. Further accuracy regarding the dating of the geoglyph is hoped to be obtained from an ongoing study using pollen core analysis. This suggested dating would place the construction of the 900 feet (270 m) geoglyph many centuries before that of the Nazca lines in Peru, the Blythe geoglyphs in California and several in England, making it one of the oldest examples of land art in the world.
