= Kusa, Russia =

Kusa Куса
- Town
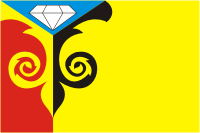
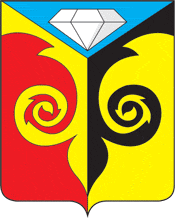
- Flag Coat of arms
- Interactive map of Kusa
- Location of Kusa Kusa (Chelyabinsk Oblast)
- Coordinates: 55°21′N 59°27′E
- Country: Russia
- Federal subject: Chelyabinsk Oblast
- Administrative district: Kusinsky District
- TownSelsoviet: Kusa
- Founded: 1778
- Town status since: January 8, 1943
- Elevation: 352 m (1,155 ft)

Population (2010 Census)
  - Total: 18,792
  - Estimate (2023): 16,934 (−9.9%)

Administrative status
  - Capital of: Kusinsky District, Town of Kusa

Municipal status
  - Municipal district: Kusinsky Municipal District
  - Urban settlement: Kusinskoye Urban Settlement
  - Capital of: Kusinsky Municipal District, Kusinskoye Urban Settlement
- Time zone: UTC+5 (MSK+2)
- Postal codes: 456940–456942, 456948
- OKTMO ID: 75638101001

Kusa (Russian: Куса́) is a town and the administrative center of Kusinsky District in Chelyabinsk Oblast, Russia, located on the Kusa and Ay Rivers, 180 kilometers (110 mi) west of Chelyabinsk, the administrative center of the oblast. Population: 18,792 (2010 census); 20,316 (2002 census); 22,606 (1989 Soviet census).

== History ==
It was founded in 1778. Town status was granted to it on January 8, 1943.

== Administrative and municipal status ==
Within the framework of administrative divisions, Kusa serves as the administrative center of Kusinsky District. As an administrative division, it is, together with three rural localities, incorporated within Kusinsky District as the Town of Kusa. As a municipal division, the Town of Kusa is incorporated within Kusinsky Municipal District as Kusinskoye Urban Settlement.

== Climate ==
Climate data for Kusa
Month	Jan	Feb	Mar	Apr	May	Jun	Jul	Aug	Sep	Oct	Nov	Dec	Year
Record high °C (°F)	4.3 (39.7)	7.4 (45.3)	15.2 (59.4)	30.7 (87.3)	35.6 (96.1)	37.5 (99.5)	40.2 (104.4)	37.6 (99.7)	33.4 (92.1)	23.4 (74.1)	15.1 (59.2)	6.4 (43.5)	40.2 (104.4)
Record low °C (°F)	−49.7 (−57.5)	−49.3 (−56.7)	−42.4 (−44.3)	−34.5 (−30.1)	−14.5 (5.9)	−5.6 (21.9)	−0.2 (31.6)	−4.4 (24.1)	−13.3 (8.1)	−26.1 (−15.0)	−36.8 (−34.2)	−48.7 (−55.7)	−49.7 (−57.5)
Average precipitation mm (inches)	40 (1.6)	32 (1.3)	17 (0.7)	30 (1.2)	32 (1.3)	51 (2.0)	72 (2.8)	60 (2.4)	56 (2.2)	46 (1.8)	34 (1.3)	47 (1.9)	517 (20.4)
