= Kusinsky District =

Kusinsky District Кусинский район (Russian)
- District
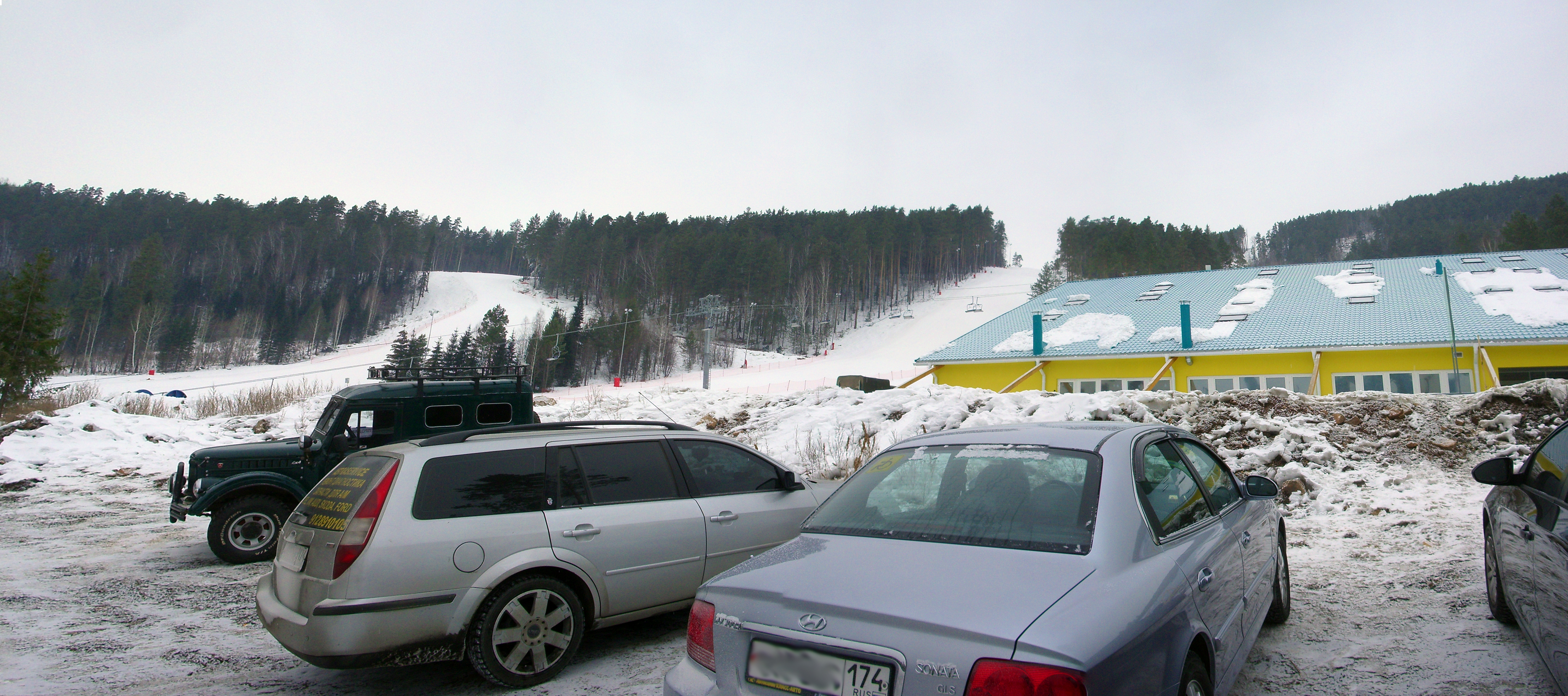
- Ski area, Kusinsky District

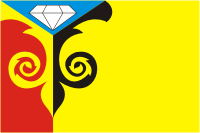
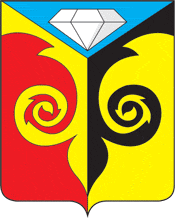
- Flag Coat of arms
- Location of Kusinsky District in Chelyabinsk Oblast
- Coordinates: 55°20′N 59°26′E
- Country: Russia
- Federal subject: Chelyabinsk Oblast
- Established: 1940
- Administrative center: Kusa

Area
  - Total: 1,513 km^{2} (584 sq mi)

Population (2010 Census)
  - Total: 29,392
  - Density: 19.43/km^{2} (50.31/sq mi)
  - Urban: 81.5%
  - Rural: 18.5%

Administrative structure
  - Administrative divisions: 1 Towns, 1 Work settlements, 3 Selsoviets
  - Inhabited localities: 1 cities/towns, 1 urban-type settlements, 21 rural localities

Municipal structure
  - Municipally incorporated as: Kusinsky Municipal District
  - Municipal divisions: 2 urban settlements, 3 rural settlements
- Time zone: UTC+5 (MSK+2)
- OKTMO ID: 75638000
- Website: http://www.admkusa.ru/

Kusinsky District (Russian: Кусинский райо́н) is an administrative and municipal district (raion), one of the twenty-seven in Chelyabinsk Oblast, Russia. It is located in the northwest of the oblast. The area of the district is 1,513 square kilometers (584 sq mi).} Its administrative center is the town of Kusa. Population: 29,392 (2010 census); 32,738 (2002 Census); 37,100 (1989 Soviet census). The population of Kusa accounts for 63.9% of the district's total population.
