= Yuryuzan, Republic of Bashkortostan =

Yuryuzan Юрюзань
- Village
- Location within Bashkortostan Location within Russia
- Coordinates: 55°40′54″N 57°04′09″E
- Country: Russia
- Region: Bashkortostan
- District: Karaidelsky District
- Time zone: UTC+5:00

Yuryuzan (Russian: Юрюза́нь; Bashkir: Йүрүҙән, Yürüźän) is a rural locality (a village) in Karaidelsky District of the Republic of Bashkortostan.
