= Katav-Ivanovsky District =

Katav-Ivanovsky District Катав-Ивановский район (Russian)
- District
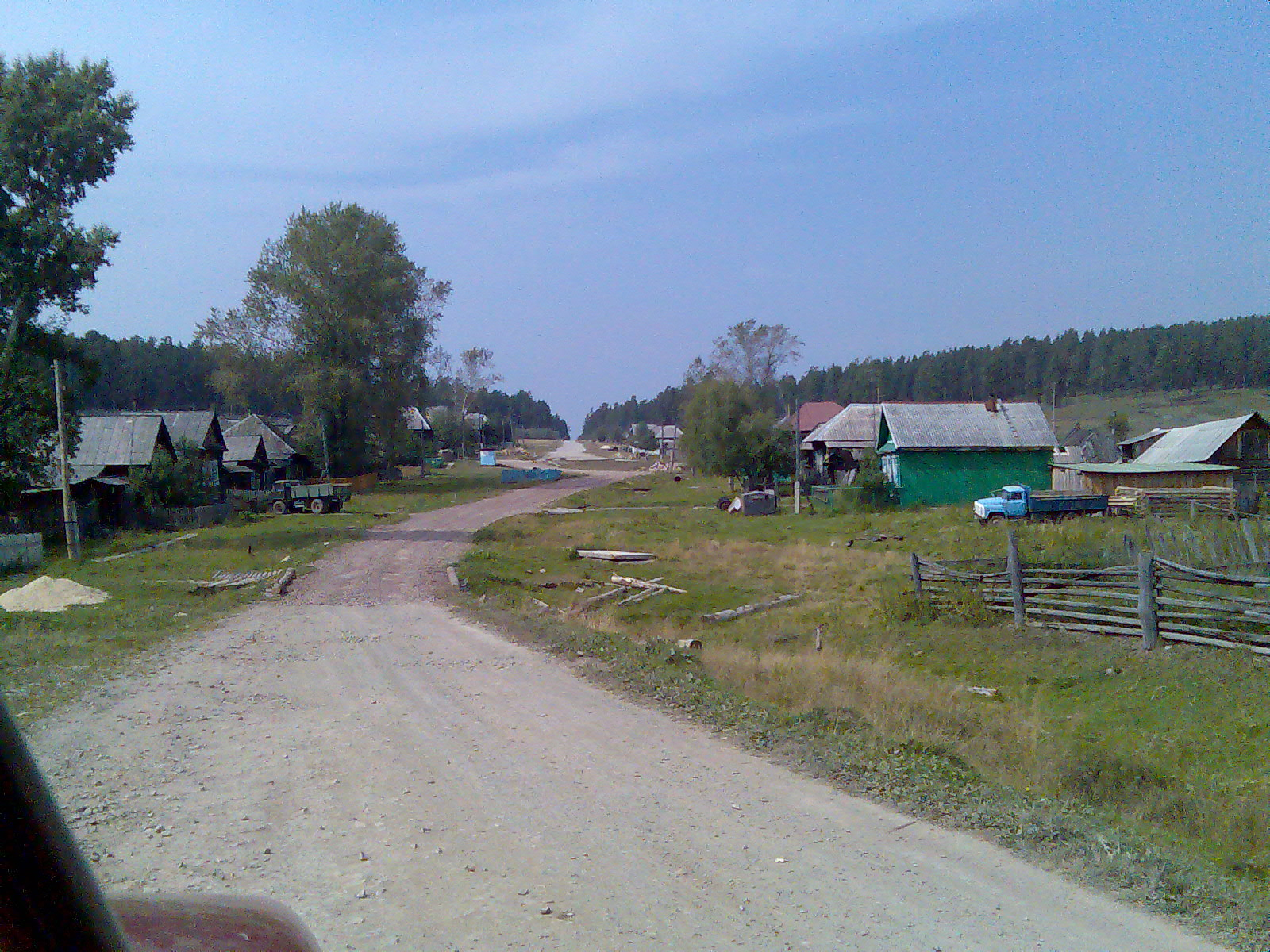
- The selo of Meseda in Katav-Ivanovsky District

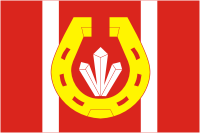
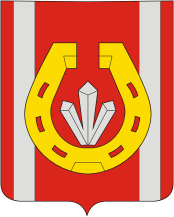
- Flag Coat of arms
- Location of Katav-Ivanovsky District in Chelyabinsk Oblast
- Coordinates: 54°45′N 58°12′E
- Country: Russia
- Federal subject: Chelyabinsk Oblast
- Established: 4 November 1926
- Administrative center: Katav-Ivanovsk

Area
  - Total: 3,415 km^{2} (1,319 sq mi)

Population (2010 Census)
  - Total: 15,327
  - Density: 4.488/km^{2} (11.62/sq mi)
  - Urban: 82.0%
  - Rural: 18.0%

Administrative structure
  - Administrative divisions: 2 Towns, 7 Selsoviets
  - Inhabited localities: 2 cities/towns, 17 rural localities

Municipal structure
  - Municipally incorporated as: Katav-Ivanovsky Municipal District
  - Municipal divisions: 2 urban settlements, 7 rural settlements
- Time zone: UTC+5 (MSK+2)
- OKTMO ID: 75629000
- Website: https://www.katavivan.ru/

Katav-Ivanovsky District (Russian: Ката́в-Ива́новский райо́н) is an administrative and municipal district (raion), one of the twenty-seven in Chelyabinsk Oblast, Russia. It is located in the west of the oblast. The area of the district is 3,415 square kilometers (1,319 sq mi). Its administrative center is the town of Katav-Ivanovsk. Population (excluding the administrative center): 15,327 (2010 census); 17,739 (2002 Census); 25,473 (1989 Soviet census).

== Administrative and municipal status ==
Within the framework of administrative divisions, it has a status of a town with territorial district—a unit equal in status to administrative districts—the full name of which is The Town of Katav-Ivanovsk and Katav-Ivanovsky District (город Катав-Ивановск и Катав-Ивановский район). As a municipal division, it is incorporated as Katav-Ivanovsky Municipal District.
