= Southern Ural =

Southern part of Ural Mountains, Russia

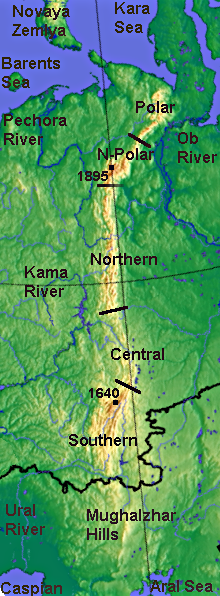
The Ural Mountains

Southern Ural (Russian: Южный Урал, Bashkir: Көньяҡ Урал) encompasses the south, the widest part of the Ural Mountains, stretches from the river Ufa (near the village of Lower Ufaley) to the Ural River. From the west and east the Southern Ural is limited to the East European Plain, West Siberian Plain and the steppes near Aral Sea and Caspian Sea.

== Geography ==
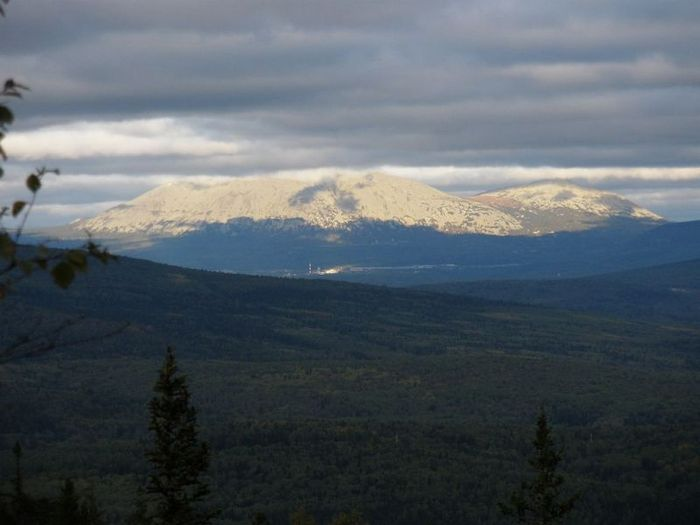
Mount Yamantau in April 2003.

The relief of the Southern Urals is complex, with numerous valleys and parallel ridges directed south-west and meridionally. The range includes the Ilmensky Mountains separated from the main ridges by the Miass River. The maximum height is 1,640 m (5,380 ft) (Mount Yamantau) and the width reaches 250 km (160 mi). Other notable peaks lie along the Iremel mountain ridge (Bolshoy Iremel and Maly Iremel), the Nurgush, highest point 1,406 m (4,613 ft), and the Nakas, highest point 667.6 m (2,190 ft). The Southern Urals extend some 550 km (340 mi) up to the sharp westward bend of the Ural River and terminate in the wide Mugodzhar Hills. The foothills of the Southern Urals extend up to 250 km (160 mi) with an average width between 40 km (25 mi) and 150 km (93 mi).

The Southern Urals include lakes such as Zyuratkul.
