= Association of Speleologists of the Urals =

Russian regional speleological organization

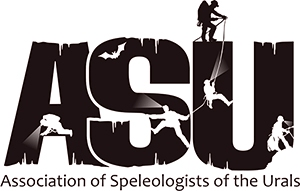
- Founded: 1989
- Type: NGO
- Purpose: Promotion and coordination of speleology in the Urals
- Location: Salavat
- Region served: Urals, Russia
- President: Artur Alekovič Asylgužin (Note: For greater accuracy Cyrillic names in this article are romanized according to Scientific transliteration of Cyrillic.)
- Website: viv-asu.ru

Association of Speleologists of the Urals (ASU) (Russian: Ассоциа́ция Спелеоло́гов Ура́ла – АСУ), founded in 1989, is a Russian non-profit speleological association dedicated to promoting and coordinating cave and karst research in the Urals region. Since 2021 it has been based in Salavat, the seat of the Salavat Speleo Club and of ASU's current president, Artur Alekovič Asylgužin. ASU is known for caving competitions "Matches of the Ural Cities", speleological seminars on cave exploration techniques, and courses on cave rescue. ASU is a notable member of the Russian Union of Speleologists and coordinates large-scale expeditions to high-mountain karst areas of Surxondaryo Region in Uzbekistan, including Boybuloq, the deepest cave in Central Asia.

== History ==
It all started at the seminar “Challenges in Collaboration Between Karst Scientists and Speleologists,” which took place on April 25 and 26, 1987, at the Kungur Karst Laboratory and Research Station, in the “Stalagmite” Tourist Complex near Kungur Ice Cave. 52 people from the entire Urals region participated; the idea of ASU was put forward and confirmed. The process was bolstered by achievements of expeditions of Ural cavers to Uzbekistan, mainly to Boybuloq, organized by the Sverdlovsk group (SGS) since 1984, the cave where in 1988 a depth of 900 meters was reached. The organizational issues related to ASU were resolved the same year, and several speleo educational events and competitions followed in the spring and summer of 1989, under the auspices of the upcoming ASU. The association was founded at the 1st Congress, held on December 16 and 17, 1989, in Kungur, Perm Kraj. 80 speleologists from 18 Ural cities participated, representing the Perm, Sverdlovsk, Čeljabinsk, and Orenburg regions, as well as the Bashkir and Udmurt autonomous republics of the USSR.

In the following years, two main events, organized by ASU, took place. Every May it was the Ural Cities Speleotechnics Competition, established in 1976 at the initiative of Semën Mihajlovič Baranov, since 1989 under the auspices of ASU, in suitable training locations near major Urals centers, and every December it was the ASU congress, again in main caving hotspots, accompanied by the conference “Issues in Ural Speleology” with presentations on current cave discoveries as well as other scientific and caving praxis topics.

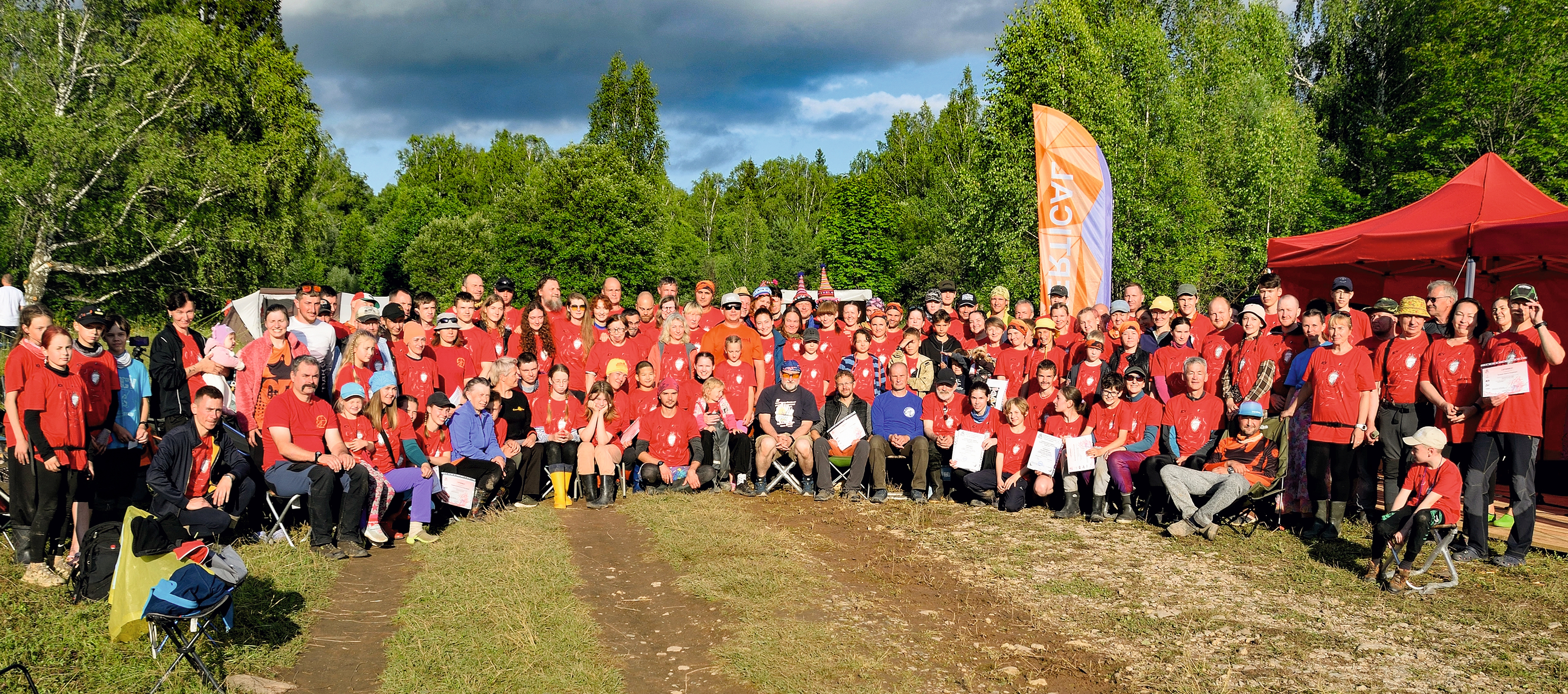
Participants of the "Ašinskaja Valley 2025" ASU training camp, July 4, 2025, Širokij dol, Aša, by Aleksej Ozimin from Sim

In August 1989, an SGS and ASU expedition to the cave Boybuloq in Uzbekistan, with guests from Italy, reached the terminal siphon at −1158 m and climbed to a point 156 m above the cave entrance, increasing cave depth to 1310 m.

In December 1990, the congress and the conference were held in Kungur, with 70 speleologists from 10 cities in the Urals and guests from Lviv, Moscow and Leningrad.

In May 1991, the 14th ASU Match took place in Ufa, together with the All-Ural Pre-Camp Training School in Gubaha and Perm. In December, the 3rd ASU Congress and the conference were held in Kungur, attended by 130 speleologists from the Urals, Moscow, and Sevastopol, with presentations on caves of the Urals, subpolar Urals, Bashkiria, Perm Oblast, Central Asia, Crimea, Bulgaria, and Italy. During the congress, 15 committees covered Cave Documentation and Speleo Toponymy, Publishing, International Relations, Training, Promotion and Outreach, Safety of Speleological Activities, Speleotechnics and Equipment, Filming and Photography in Caves, Underwater Speleology, Speleomedicine, Cave Ecology, Artificial Cavities and Caves, Gatherings and Competitions, Young Speleologists, Cave Archaeology and Paleontology.

In 1992 an SGS and ASU expedition to Boybuloq climbed an additional chimney to +257 m above the cave entrance, increasing cave depth to 1415 m. It was the third deepest cave in the world — after Gouffre Jean-Bernard in France (1602 meters) and Huautla / Rincón in Mexico (1475 meters).

The 7th ASU Congress conference in 1994, held in Kungur, featured screenings of videos on speleoclub activities, the competition among Ural cities in caving techniques and tactics, and SRT techniques.

During 21st competition at the Ermak rock in Perm in 1998, the following events also took place: Bivouac contest, Best speleology-themed photography contest, Homemade descending and ascending equipment contest, Emblem and badge contest.

In August and September 1999 (13 participants) as well as in September 2000 (15 participants), joint Perm–Ekaterinburg expeditions to the North Caucasus, to Moria cave in the Dzhentu massif took place.

In September 2001, a meeting of Ural speleologists was held at the “Svetofor” recreation center in Pervouralsk to mark the 40th anniversary of the SGS. 160 people attended, with guests fr om Perm, Orenburg, Čeljabinsk, Berezniki, and Ufa.

In June 2008, a cave rescue training course on transporting a casualty from the cave to the surface using new SSF (French Cave Rescue) techniques took place in Čeljabinsk. Bernard Tourte (France) and Sergio Garcia de la Vega (Spain) were the instructors of 29 trainees.

Following this event, the First Ural Cave Rescue Training Camp took place in June 2009, at the Kinderle Cave, organized by Ufa speleologists.

In August 2010 there was a 21-member SGS and ASU expedition, with 2 guests from Moscow, to caves of the Hodja-Gur-Gur-Ata ridge in Uzbekistan, primarily dedicated to the cave Festival'naja. In September of the same year, an ASU expedition to the Crimean Peninsula, to caves in Čatyr-Dag and Dolgorukovskaja Jajla massifs took place, with 13 speleologists from the Urals and Tjumen and Gennadij Samohin as the local guide.

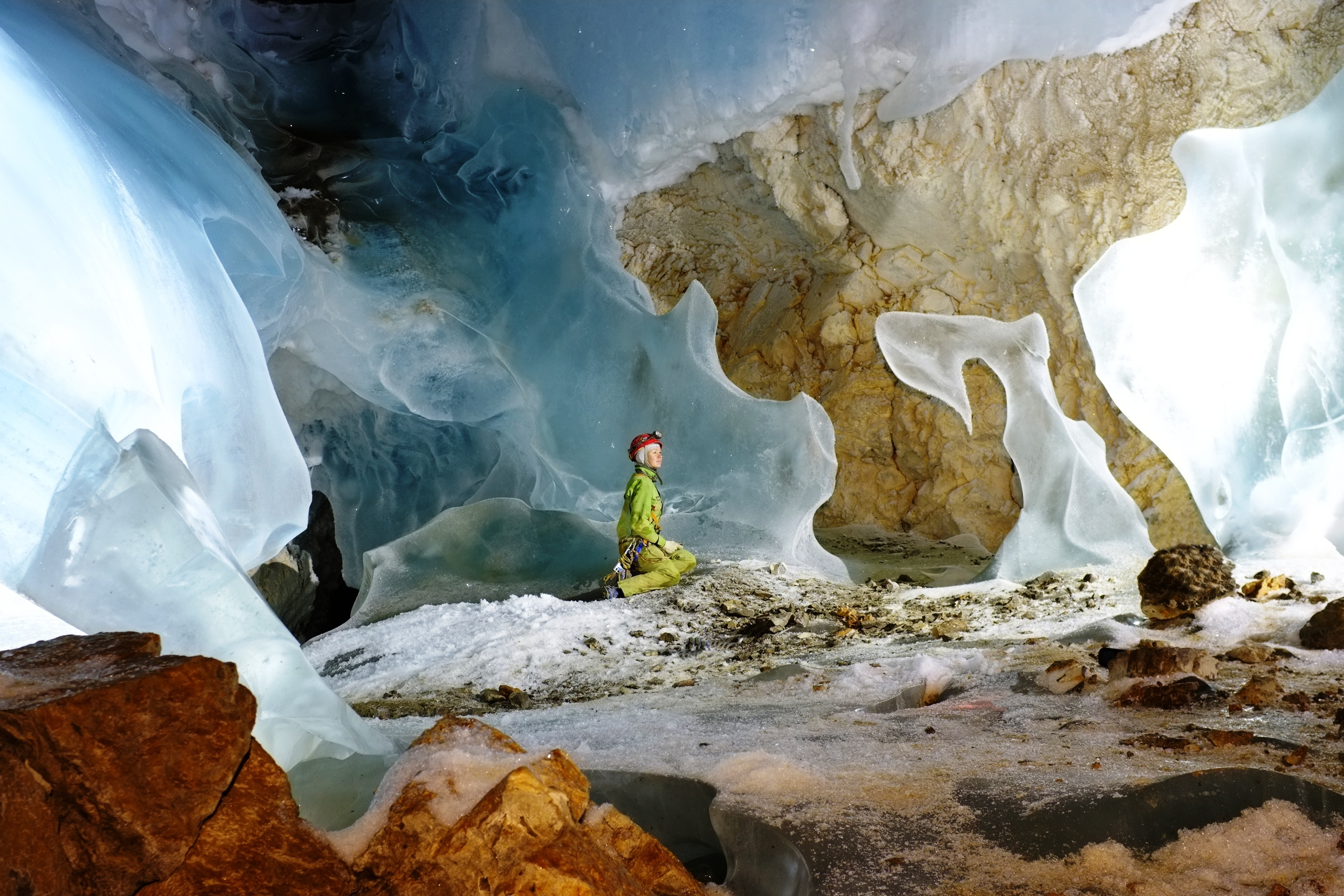
Full Moon hall in the Dark Star Cave, by Aleksej Kuznecov from Ekaterinburg

In August 2011, a 20-member SGS and ASU expedition followed, with 4 guests from Moscow, Kazan' and Tjumen, as well as 3 from Padua and Florence (Italy), again to the Hodja-Gur-Gur-Ata ridge, yet this time to the cave Dark Star.

In 2012, a large expedition to Hodja-Gur-Gur-Ata caves by SGS and ASU, 29 people from Russia, Italy, Spain, China, and Germany, worked in the caves Ulugh Beg, Festival'naja, and Dark Star. All in all, 6 km of new tunnels were surveyed, and Dark Star's depth increased to 600 meters.

In 2013, a team of 21, with guests from Italy and Germany, deepened the cave to 858 meters below the top entrance.

This result attracted the largest SGS and ASU expedition to Hodja-Gur-Gur-Ata in 2014, 31 people from 6 countries, including a National Geographic photo crew. A team of 4 explored the ridge plateau from an altitude of 3700 m down, from above the Red dwarf entrance to above the bottom of Dark Star, where they discovered a small canyon leading towards a lake at an altitude of 2400 m. This discovery reduced the cave depth potential from 2100 m to 1100 m. The Dark Star team examined the bottom of the cave, at a depth of 900 m, and found poorly soluble non-karst strata such as shale and sandstone – the cave reached its end.

In 2015, an SGS and ASU expedition of 26 operated in 3 groups: the first of 14 in the Dark Star cave, the second of 5 in the Holtan-Čašma water spring below Boybuloq's terminal siphon, and the third on top of the ridge above the cave. At the bottom of Dark Star, the team unsuccessfully tried to get through boulder chokes and previously impassable meander tights. The second group continued Diving in the spring, which was resumed in 2014. They reached a point 70 m from the entrance and 16 m deep. Further advance would require widening of a tight passage. The third group, a search team of 7, led by Vasilij Samsonov from Orenburg, systematically examined the 3 km section of the 150–200 m wall below the NE side of the ridge above Boybuloq. Of several possible cave entrances, all located 30–50 m below the top of the wall, the most promising proved to be the one marked as ČB-15 (Chul-Bair 15), 3522 m a. s. l. and 25 m below the top of the wall. 400 meters from the entrance and 70 meters deep, the team stopped at a tight fissure which they eventually broke but did not proceed due to lack of time.

An SGS and ASU expedition in 2016, with 26 people, including Italian and Ukrainian guests, worked primarily in caves on the Chul-Bair. One team nevertheless visited the Hodja-Gur-Gur-Ata ridge to try to connect the Northern and Southern caves through Isetskaja cave. A meander, leading to the closest Northern group cave, Iževskaja, was discovered, but it quickly turned away from the desired direction. After the entrance R-20, close to Iževskaja, cavers advanced 1300 m to a depth of 190 m and to a distance of 100 m of the nearest point in Dark Star. They renamed R-20 to Registan. Further work on Hodja-Gur-Gur-Ata was put on hold; the focus changed to the new cave above Boybuloq. The diving group continued work in the Holtan-Čašma spring cave. 170 m from the entrance and 18 m deep, they reached a lenticular grotto, with slots extending downwards too narrow to pass. A team of 7 continued work in the ČB-15 cave in the wall of the Chul-Bair ridge. They widened the passage at −70 m and descended 15 m into a hall which led to a narrow but tall meander (up to 30 m). After a 40 m shaft and a series of difficult passages, they reached a small stream. It led, as a tributary, to a wider and higher meander with a larger stream. The lack of time forced them to return. The cave, deepened to 234 m and prolonged to 1089 m, was renamed Višnevskij cave, after Aleksandr Višnevskij, leader of SGS expeditions to Boybuloq from 1988 to 1992 and 1995–2008, who died in 2015. The cave steadily descended towards Boybuloq.

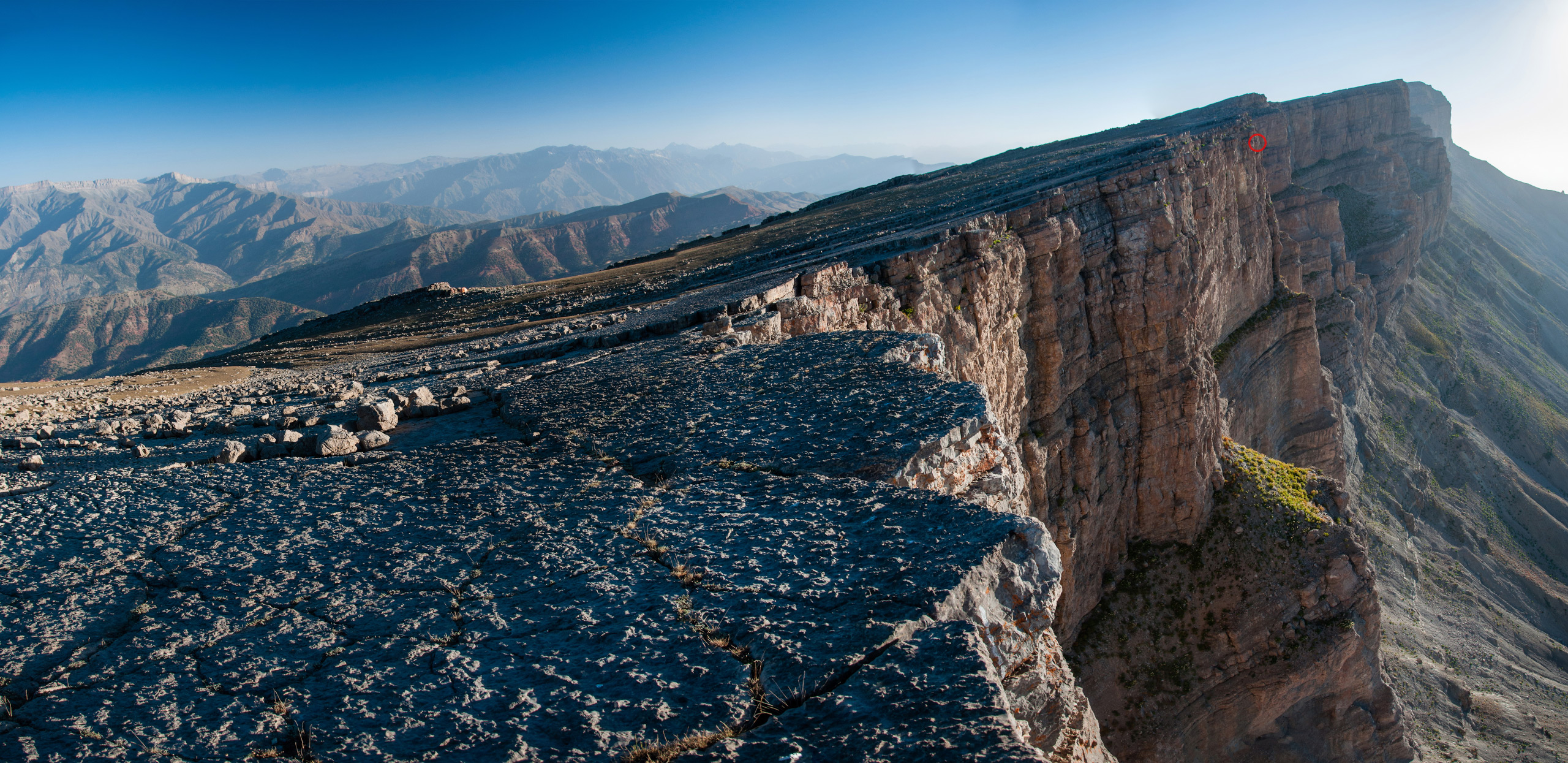
Chul-Bair ridge with marked entrance to the cave, named after A. S. Višnevskij, 3522 meters a. s. l., by Petr Jakubson from Samara

2017's expedition of 10 from SGS and ASU set up camp above the Višnevskij cave entrance, at an elevation of 3550 m. From the underground camp at −168 m, S. Terehin and A. Abdjušev advanced to the siphon at −735 m, in one push. The cave survey was conducted to a depth of 586 m and to a length of 2800 m, steadily towards Boybuloq. The surface team found new entrances above the cave, hoping to shorten the long crawl to the bottom, but none connected to Višnevskij.

In 2018, an international team from Russia (14, SGS and ASU), France (8) and Switzerland (3) worked in Višnevskij, Boybuloq, Lunnaja, and ČB-5 caves. In the canyon which leads to Boybuloq, dinosaur footprints were found. 2500 m of new tunnels were surveyed in Višnevskij and Lunnaja, but the siphon bypass was not found. No clear continuation was a human resources problem for the 2019 expedition of SGS and ASU, solved by cavers from Moscow and Irkutsk, who increased the group to 15. 4 proceeded to the cave bottom to search for possible continuation at −600 m. But on the first day at the bottom, E. Sakulin and A. Janina crawled through a tight, half-flooded passage and found a siphon bypass. The team, reinforced with E. Rybka, V. Samsonov, and V. Loginov (called by phone connection to the surface), proceeded through a series of ever larger passages and halls with crawls and tight meanders in between: "Big gallery", "Big Collapse Hall", "Amber River", "Aquapark" until they stopped in an open tunnel above two more shafts, because of lack of time and rope. Višnevskij was deepened to 1131 m and prolonged to 8004 m. Boybuloq was about 200 m horizontally and 50 m vertically (below) away. The eventual connection, at around 2,300 metres (7,500 ft) a. s. l. would make a 2,033 metres (6,670 ft) deep cave.

In 2020, a large expedition to the Višnevskij cave was scrapped because of the COVID-19 pandemic. An 18-member Russian-French-Slovenian-Uzbek 2021 expedition of SGS and ASU worked in both caves. The Višnevskij cave continued to the large terminal siphon at a depth of 1283 m; it bypassed Boybuloq diagonally, below the closest tunnel, but the intercave distance was reduced to 70 m, nearest points being at about the same altitude. The survey team in Boybuloq mapped the upper tunnels in the New branch, explored in 2016. Its end was 272 m above the cave entrance; Boybuloq's depth increased to 1430 m - from 1415 m, achieved in 1992.

In 2022, a 20-member SGS and ASU expedition, in 4 groups, operated only in Boybuloq; the single task was to connect the cave to Višnevskij. The diving group of two explored three siphons upstream. Two were too narrow to pass; after the third, a large tunnel followed; the diver had no gear or experience to climb the obstacles. The scouting group checked the side meanders in the vicinity of the meeting point. No draught in the direction of Višnevskij was found. The climbing group explored the upper floors, and at the end of the expedition they climbed a 170-meter-high chimney, wide enough, which continued with a tunnel, presumably leading in the direction of the Višnevskij cave. Due to the lack of time, they returned. The engineering team was widening the narrows in the projected direction to Višnevskij cave. They advanced around 20 m; there was no draught to follow. The cave depth did not change; around 1 km of new tunnels were explored; no survey was made.

3 teams of the 2023 SGS and ASU expedition worked in the Višnevskij cave, one in Boybuloq. The engineering group was widening the narrows in the direction of Boybuloq, gained 35 meters; there was no draught. The climbing group was exploring the tunnels on top of the chimneys, with no success. The siphon-draining group was emptying a smaller suspended siphon in the lower part of the cave, using hermetic bags. They managed to drain the siphon only halfway. A connection between the two caves was also established, using Nicola phones. The best connection was also searched for with sounds from both sides (drilling, hammer blows). The best sound was near the siphon, which was being dried, and the assumed nearest tunnel in Boybuloq. Boybulow depth increased to 1517 meters, Višnevskij cave length to 8.6 km. A small, 11-member ASU expedition took place in 2024, with guests from Poland and Czechia, as well as 2-day visitors from Croatia, Austria and Slovenia, operated in Boybuloq and on top of the Chul-Bair ridge. A speleologist from SGS led all previous expeditions; this time it was headed by Aleksandr Kuznecov from Snežinsk. Boybuloq's depth or length did not change, but an important ice cave was discovered, Bear cave (Medvežja peščera) at an altitude of 3768 meters above sea level, 246 meters above the entrance to Višnevskij cave. It opened a perspective to increase Boybuloq's depth to more than 2,200 metres (7,200 ft), on a par with the two deepest caves in the world.

The 35-member expedition in 2025, one of the largest, by SGS and ASU, managed to increase the depth slightly, to 1523 meters, going upwards from the point reached in 2023. They also made a survey of cave parts, discovered earlier and during this expedition, to obtain the new cave length of 19900 meters. The expedition worked in both caves, in Boybuloq and Višnevskij. On the last day of the expedition's work in Boybuloq, the connection searching team discovered the first really promising lead, with strong air current, and advanced 50 meters through the meander towards Višnevskij. The team of Hodja-Gur-Gur-Ata ridge made a more precise survey of several known cave parts and a survey of newly discovered tunnels, over 5 km in all.

ASU is also known as a co-organizer of several all-Russian caving techniques championships. The first such event, the 1st Russian Caving Techniques Championship, held in May 1997 on the rock outcrops of Mount Šihan, near Ufa, together with 20th Ural Cities Speleotechnics Competition (ASU) was co-organized by the State Committee of the Russian Federation for Physical Culture and Sports, the Russian Tourist and Sports Union, ASU, SGS, and the Čeljabinsk speleoclub “Pluto.” 3rd (2001), 4th (2004), 5th (2006), 6th (2008), 11th (2014), 13th (2019), 14th (2021), 16th (2025) and 17th (2026) Russian Caving Techniques Championships were organized with participation of ASU and took place in White Rocks near Adler, Ermak rock near Kungur, Takmak Rocks near Krasnojarsk, Arakulskij Šihan granite rock ridge between Verhnij Ufalej and Snežinsk, Rocks of the Jurjuzan' near Salavat (11th and 13th), Rocks of the Šujda ridge near Jurjuzan', and “Truba” Climbing Wall, “Izumrudnyj” quarry near Čeljabinsk (16th and 17th).

== “Forward and Deeper” project ==
In Russian it is "Вперед И Вглубь" – VIV, a large-scale ASU initiative dedicated to the history of cave exploration in the Urals, undertaken by both scientists and cave exploration enthusiasts. It started from the archives of the Perm Speleological Section, from materials related to speleology, gathered in the times of USSR. They were varied, ranging from complete reports on events to souvenir items. In the framework of the project, a database is being built of historical facts, maps, reports, and photographs of Ural caves. The second aspect is to collect and publish information about the pioneers of caving and speleology in the Urals. The third aspect is the development of the field – the study of the evolution of methods and equipment for underground exploration.

== Members ==
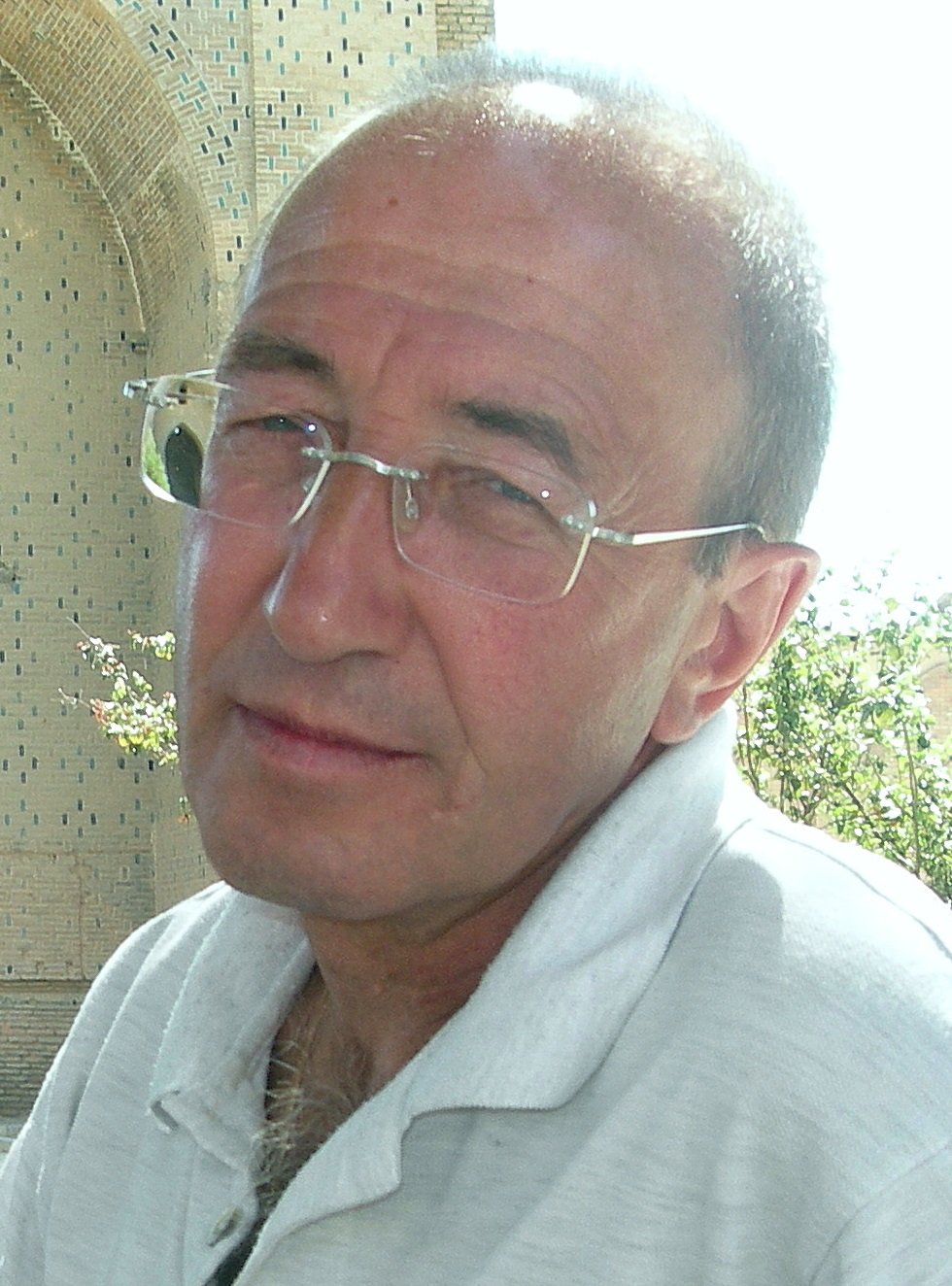
Aleksandr Višnevskij

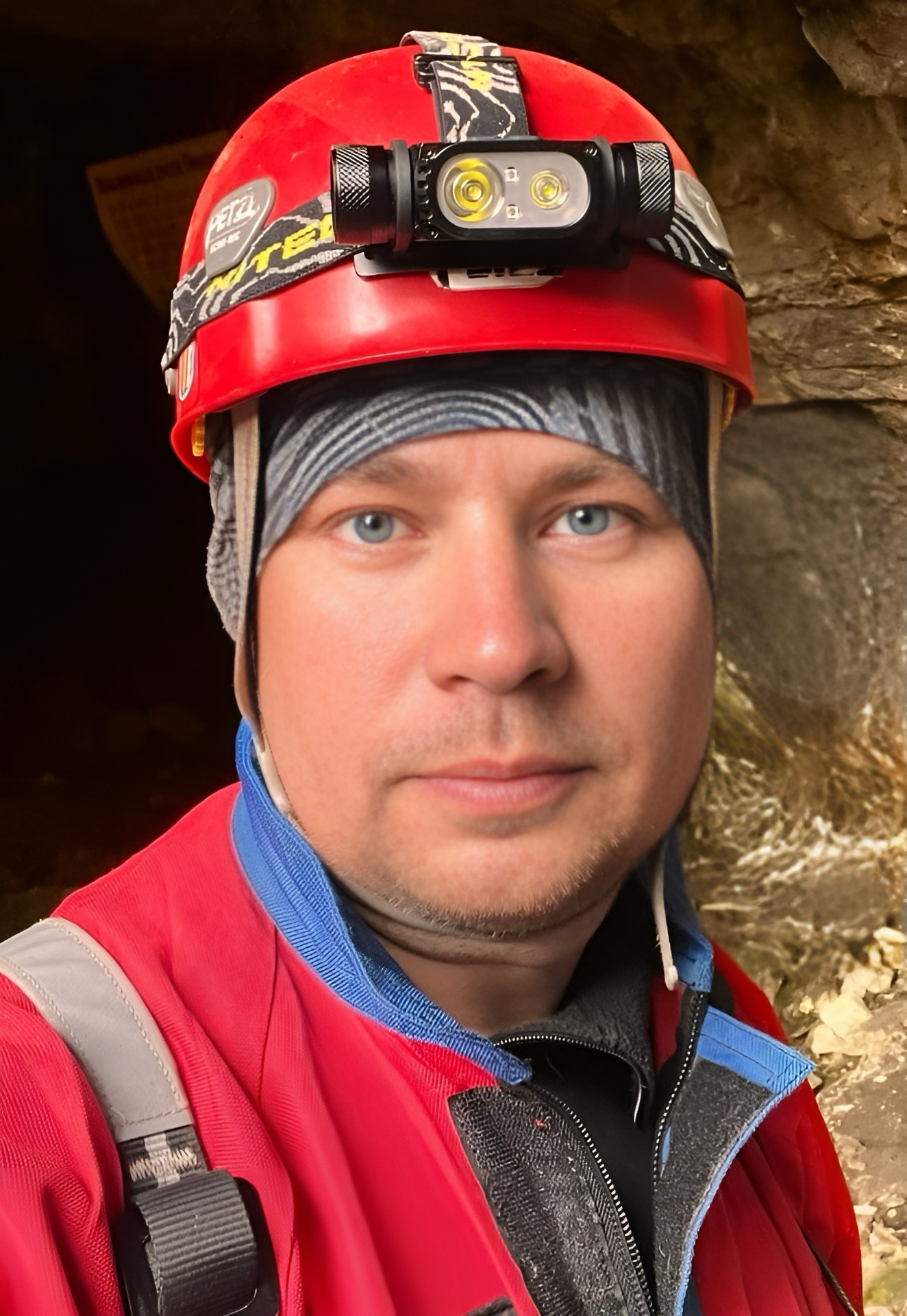
Artur Asylgužin

As of 2025, speleological organizations from the following regions and cities were members of the Association of Speleologists of the Urals:

- Regions – Sverdlovsk Oblast, Perm Krai, Samara Oblast, Orenburg Oblast, the Republic of Bashkortostan, Čeljabinsk Oblast;
- Cities (they are ordered alphabetically) – Čeljabinsk, Ekaterinburg, Magnitogorsk, Miass, Orenburg, Perm, Pervouralsk, Polevskoj, Salavat, Samara, Syzran', Sim, Snežinsk, Troick and Ufa.

== List of presidents ==
There were 7 presidents of ASU, and Sergej Jur'evič Ryčagov from Ufa was the longest serving, from 2014 to 2021:

- 1989–1992: Aleksandr Višnevskij
- 1993–1998: Semën Baranov
- 1999–2004: Sergej Evdokimov
- 2005–2011: Anatolij Afanas'ev
- 2012–2014: Petr Grigor'ev
- 2014–2021: Sergej Ryčagov
- since 2021: Artur Asylgužin

== Publications ==
Since 1999, ASU has published the Bulletin of the Association of Speleologists of the Urals. It brings match reports, conference reports, regulations, and other official ASU documents on about 20 pages, black and white, without photos. The bulletin was published up to four times a year, often more rarely; the last issue was in 2009.

Journal ASU is the official periodical of the association. Published since 2006, it features expedition reports, deep-sea exploration, and articles on speleology and competitions. In 2022, the publication was renamed to "Abyss" (Bezdna).
