= Ignatievskaya Cave =

Cave and archaeological site in Russia

- Игнатиевская пещера (Russian)
- Yamazy-Tash
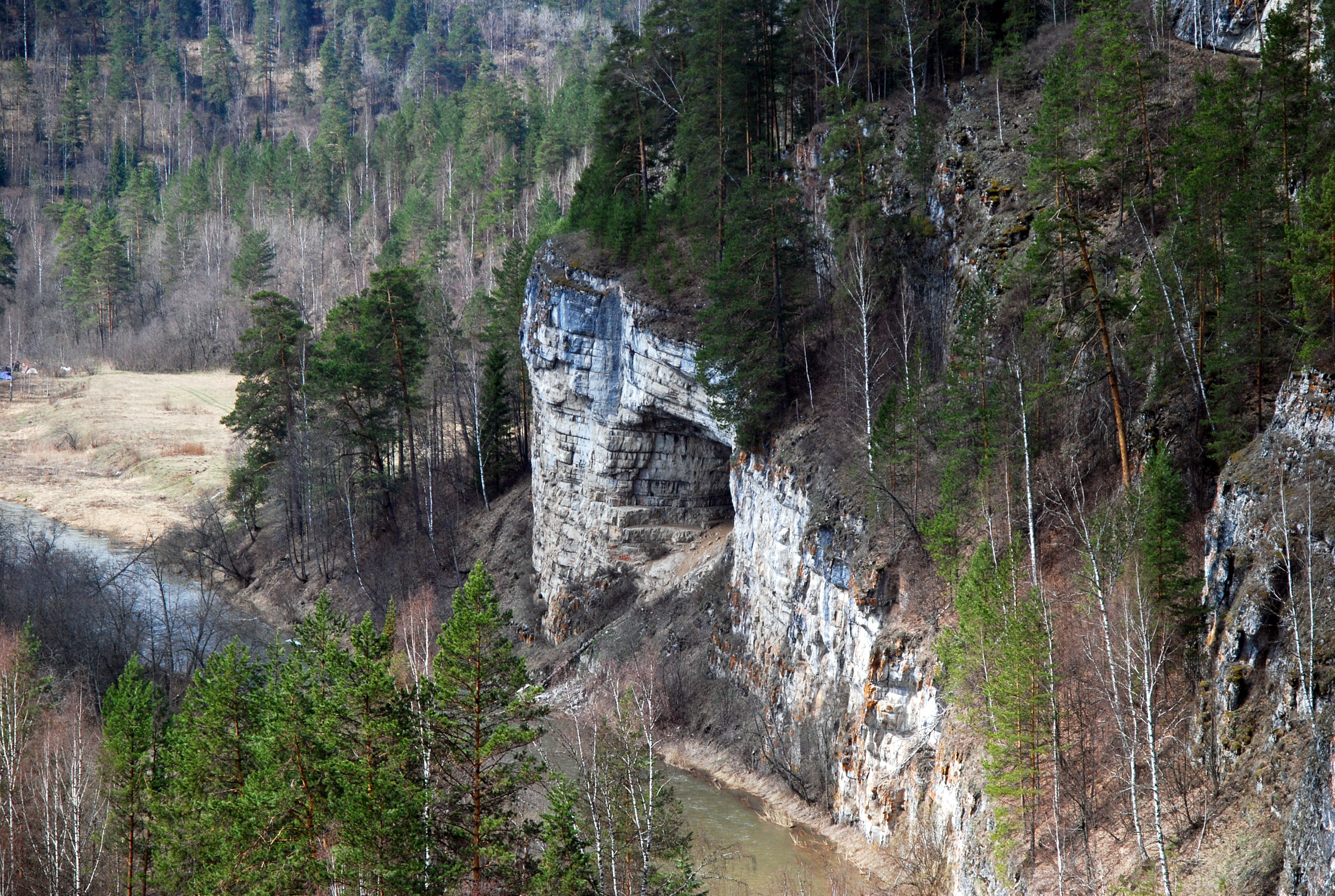
- Sim river and cave entry

- Location in Russia
- 54°53′57″N 57°46′50″E
- Type: limestone cave
- Periods: Paleolithic
- Location: on the banks of the Sim River, Sim, Chelyabinsk Oblast
- Region: Southern Ural Mountains

Ignatievskaya Cave (Russian: Игнатиевская пещера, also known as Ignatievka Cave and Yamazy-Tash) is a large limestone cave in Russia, in the southern Ural Mountains on the banks of the Sim River, a tributary of the Belaya river. It is part of the Serpievka group of caves, which are thought to contain the northernmost examples of Paleolithic cave art.

Administratively the area is part of the Katav-Ivanovsky District of Chelyabinsk Oblast. It is said to have been named after a resident hermit, named Ignat(ius). The better known Kapova cave is located some 190 km (120 mi) from the Serpievka group.

The cave contains microliths, remains of animals and about 160 cave paintings (including that of a mammoth), as well as a stratum of Iron Age settlement. The first paintings were discovered in 1980, including a partial wall painting of a female figure, with the twenty-eight red dots between her legs believed to represent the female menstrual cycle.

The cave has been closed to the public since 2018 due to vandalism concerns. It has been protected as a branch of the Ilmensky Nature Reserve since 1983.

== Dating the paintings ==
Although most sources associate the paintings to the Upper Paleolithic, the age of the drawings continues to be debated. The radiocarbon dating of the charcoal drawings has resulted in more recent numbers, between 6,000 and 8,000 years ago. The attempt to date the red pigment of the female figure yielded no result. In this respect, the age of the drawings remains unclear so far.

According to a 2021 study, the age of the Ignatievskaya Cave paintings, as determined by 230Th dating of flowstone, is constrained to the Upper Paleolithic period, specifically between approximately 78,000 and 10,000 years ago. This range is derived from 230Th dating of flowstone that formed before and after the paintings, indicating that artistic activity occurred during a period when flowstone did not form due to permafrost conditions in the Southern Ural. Additionally, 14C dates from cultural layers associated with artistic activity, containing ochre, suggest a narrower timeframe of 18.3–15.8 ka BP (calibrated), consistent with the Upper Paleolithic.

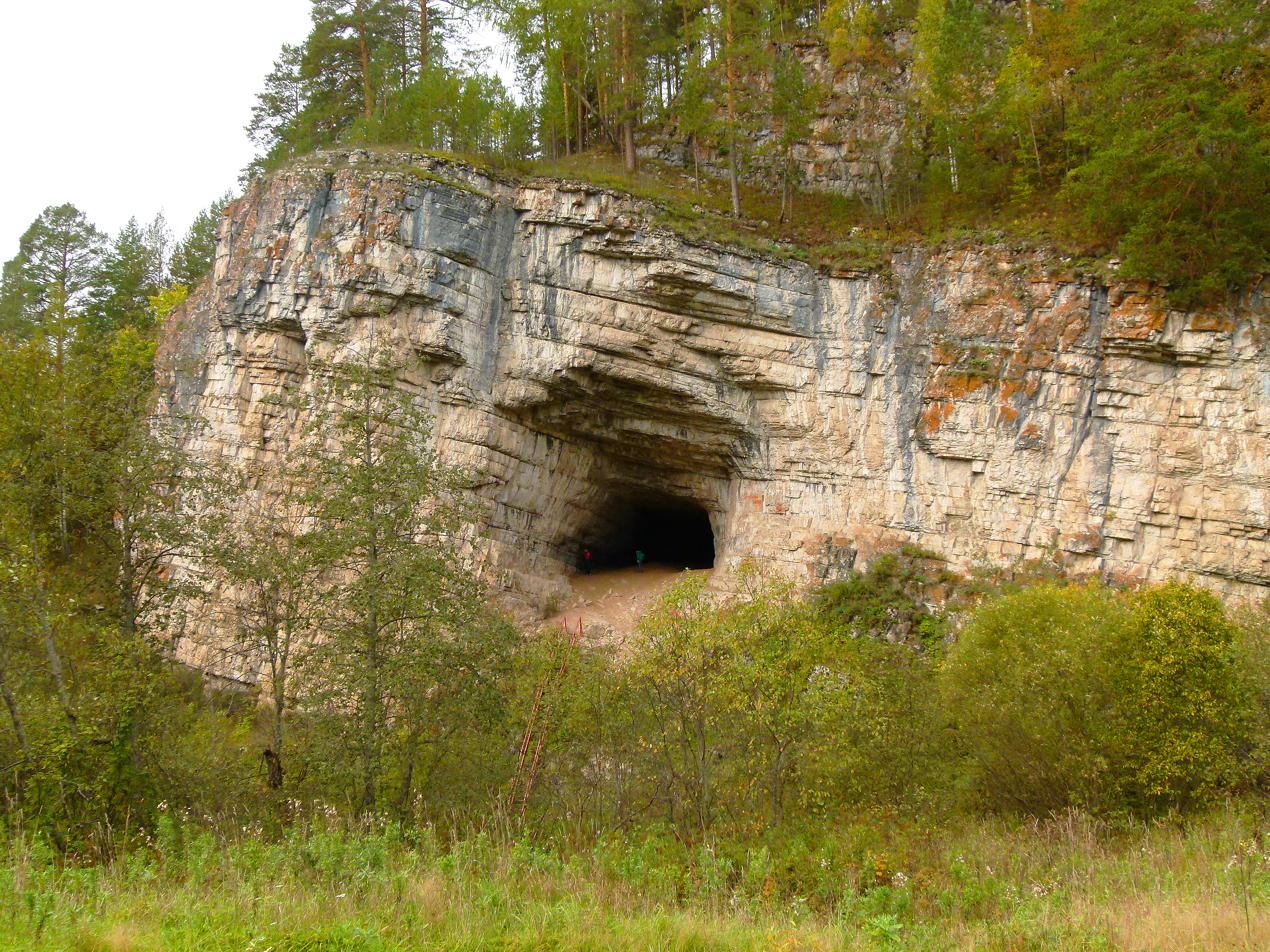
Alternative view of cave entrance

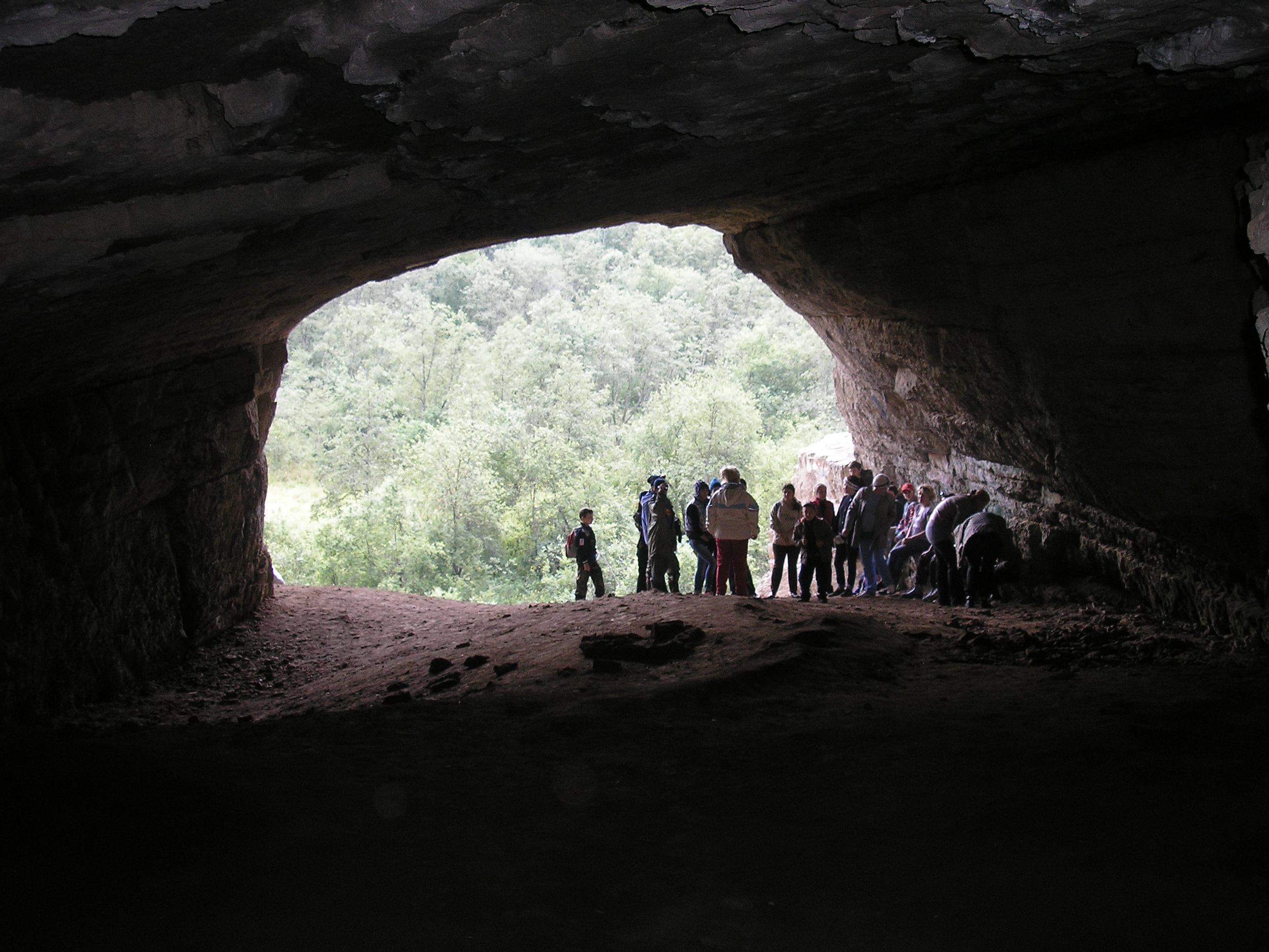
Looking out from the cave

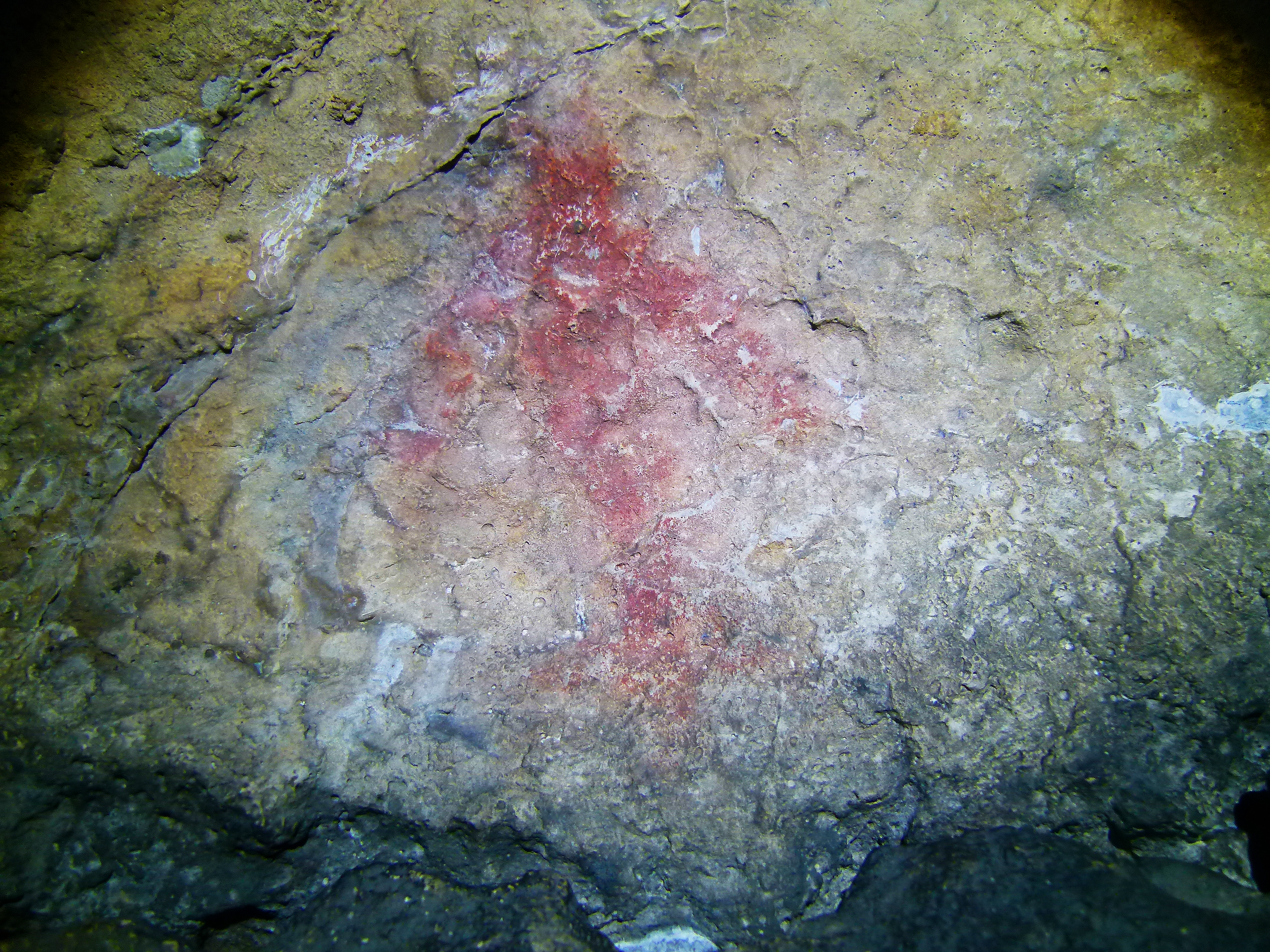
Ochre figure of a person
