= Ilmen =

Ilmen may refer to:

- Lake Ilmen, a lake in Novgorod Oblast, Russia
- Ilmensky Mountains, in Chelyabinsk Oblast, Russia, which gives the name to ilmenite
- Il’mena, a Russian ship
- Middle-earth cosmology#Ilmen, an atmospheric region of J. R. R. Tolkien's Middle-earth stories
