= Kazakh forest steppe =

Ecoregion (WWF)

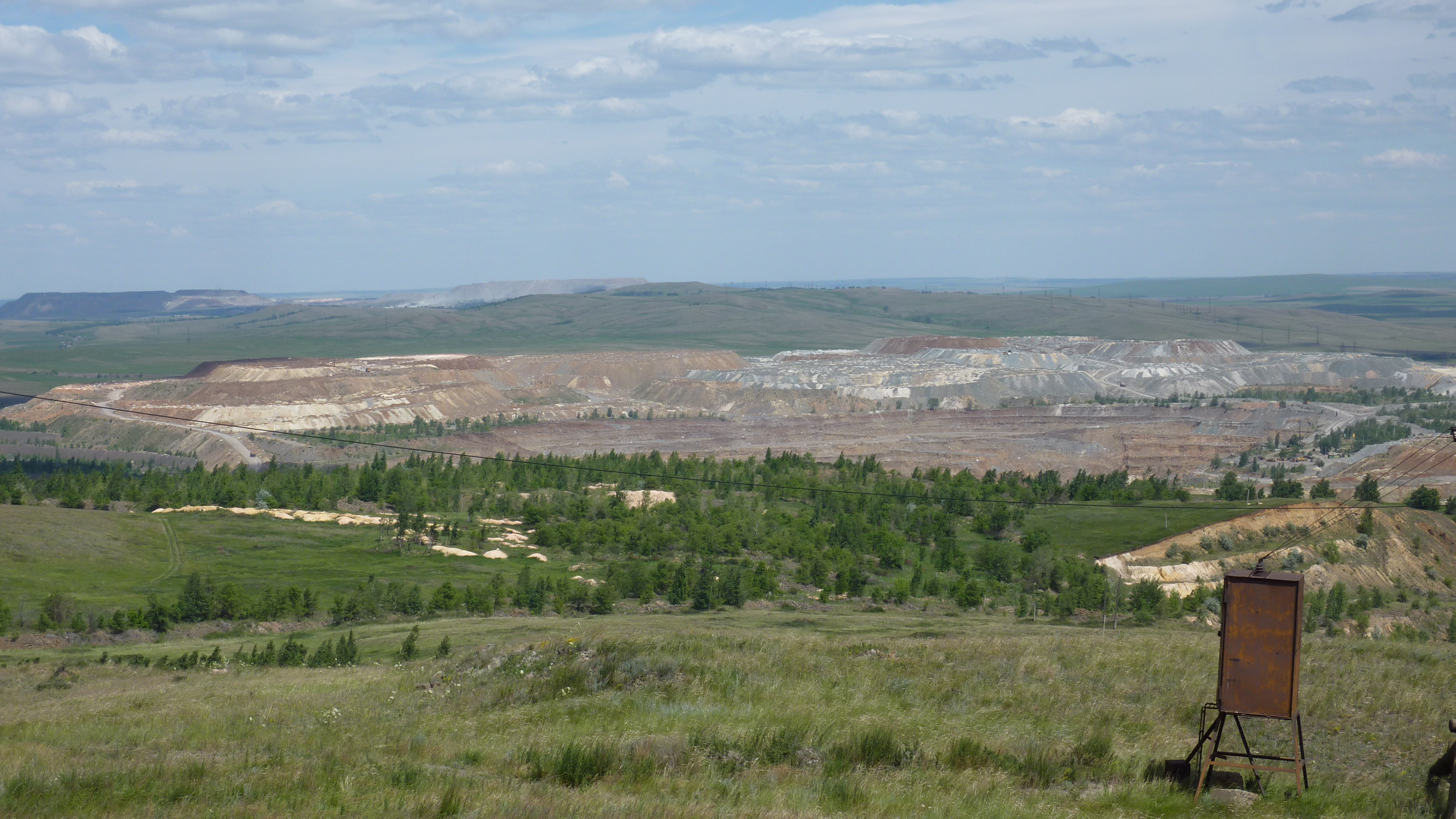
- Open mine near Magnitogorsk, Russia, at the western edge of the Kazakh forest steppe

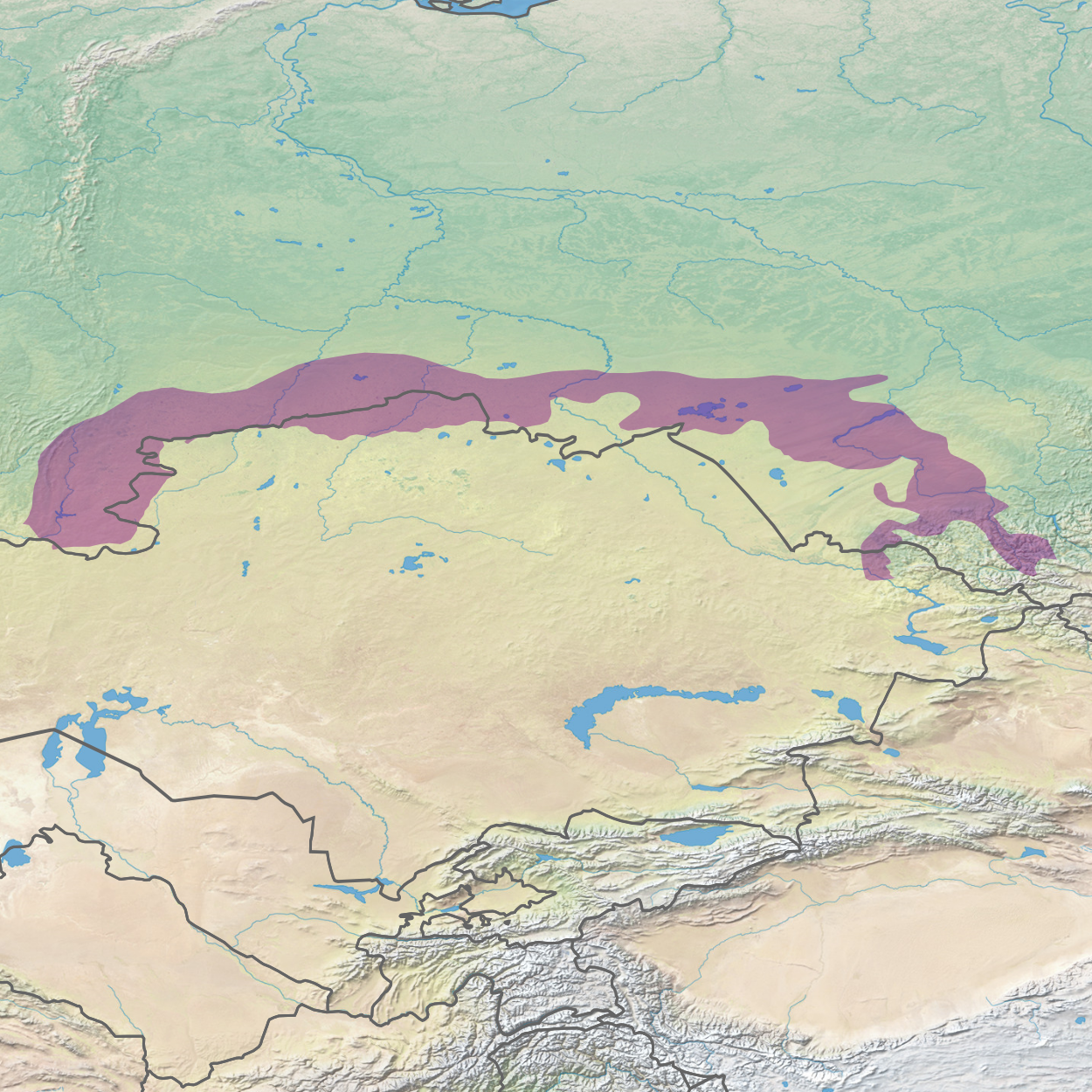
- Ecoregion territory (in purple)

Ecology
- Realm: Palearctic
- Biome: temperate grasslands, savannas, and shrublands
- Borders: List: Altai montane forest and forest steppe; East European forest steppe; Kazakh steppe; Pontic steppe; Sayan montane conifer forests; Urals montane tundra and taiga; West Siberian broadleaf and mixed forests

Geography
- Area: 422,360 km^{2} (163,070 mi^{2})
- Countries: Russia; Kazakhstan

Conservation
- Protected: 50,222 km^{2} (12%)

The Kazakh forest steppe ecoregion (WWF ID: PA0809) is a long thin strip of transition zone between the forested taiga of Siberian Russia (to the north), and the Kazakh steppe to the south. The ecoregion stretches over 2,000 km from the southern Ural mountains in the west to the foothills of Altai mountains in the east, yet averages only 200 km from south to north across its length. Since the region is further inland than the European forest steppe, and some 300 to 500 km further north, the climate is more continental, and with less precipitation, the tree cover is more sparse. The ecoregion is in the Temperate grasslands, savannas, and shrublands biome, and the Palearctic realm, with a Humid Continental climate. It covers 420,614 km^{2} (162,400 sq mi).

== Location and description ==
The ecoregion stretches along the border between Russia and Kazakhstan, mostly on the northern (Russian) side, with a few small sections in Kazakhstan proper. The terrain is relatively flat lowland plains, with wetlands in the depressions and strips of trees following water courses on the sandy soil. To the north is the West Siberian taiga ecoregion and to the south is the Kazakh steppe.

== Climate ==
The climate of the region is Humid continental climate, warm summer (Köppen climate classification (Dfb)). This climate is characterized by high variation in temperature, both daily and seasonally, with long, cold winters and short, cool summers and no month averaging over 22 °C (72 °F). There is just enough precipitation (averaging 330 mm/year) to support patchy stands of trees. The mean temperature at the center of the ecoregion is −17.6 °C (0.3 °F) in January, and 19.7 °C (67.5 °F) in July.

== Flora and fauna ==
The region exhibits the typical forest steppe mix of grasslands and forest too sparse to create a full canopy. Typical trees are birch, aspen and pine, often growing in small groves called 'kolky', with the pine trees frequently growing in long strips of sandy soil in formations called 'ribbon forests'. Swamps are common. The region was about 15% forested; this has been reduced by human activity. The most common grass is Calamagrostis epigejos (bushgrass). A study in 2003 indicated the small portion of the Kazakh forest steppe that is in Kazakhstan (about 21,000 Km2) shows cover which is 13% planted in spring wheat, 37% in dryland cropland/pasture, and 51% in a mosaic of cropland and forest.

== Protections ==
There are two significant protected areas in the Kazakh forest steppe ecoregion;

- Ilmen Nature Reserve, protecting an area of the Ilmensky Mountains on the southeast of the Ural Mountains that has historically been the subject of intense mineral extraction, with over 400 former mines in the borders.
- Tigireksky Nature Reserve, on the far eastern end of the ecoregion, at the foothills of the Altai-Sayan region, and transitioning into mountain-steppe habitats.

== See also ==
- List of ecoregions in Russia
- List of ecoregions in Kazakhstan
