= Minyar =

Minyar Миньяр
- Town
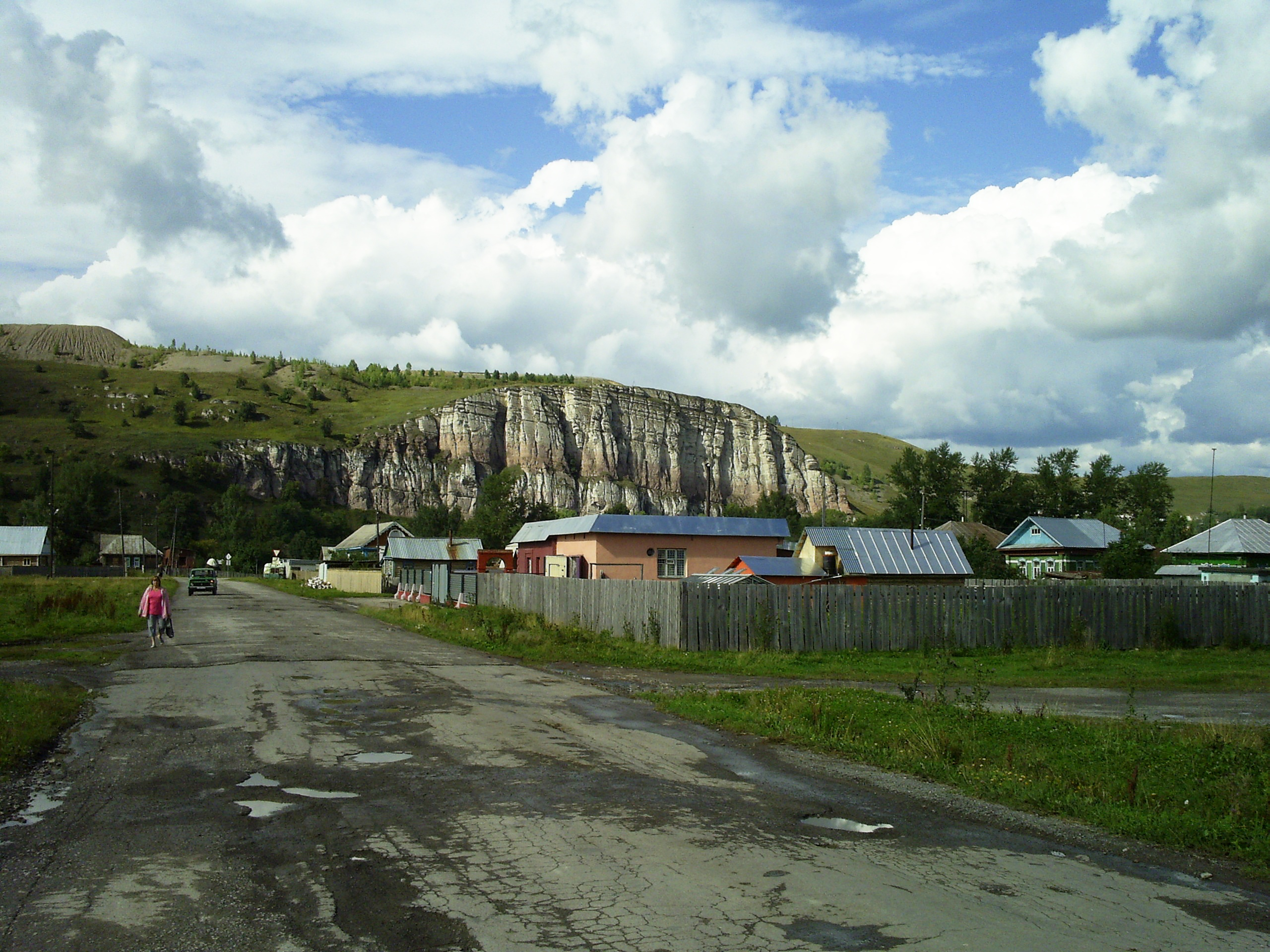
- View of Minyar

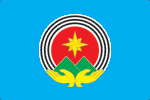
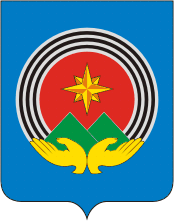
- Flag Coat of arms
- Interactive map of Minyar
- Location of Minyar Minyar (Chelyabinsk Oblast)
- Coordinates: 55°04′N 57°33′E
- Country: Russia
- Federal subject: Chelyabinsk Oblast
- Administrative district: Ashinsky District
- TownSelsoviet: Minyar
- Founded: 1771
- Town status since: May 14, 1943
- Elevation: 165 m (541 ft)

Population (2010 Census)
  - Total: 10,194
  - Estimate (2023): 8,364 (−18%)

Administrative status
  - Capital of: Town of Minyar

Municipal status
  - Municipal district: Ashinsky Municipal District
  - Urban settlement: Minyarskoye Urban Settlement
  - Capital of: Minyarskoye Urban Settlement
- Time zone: UTC+5 (MSK+2)
- Postal codes: 456007, 456008
- OKTMO ID: 75609103001
- Website: minyar-city.ru

Minyar (Russian: Минья́р) is a town in Ashinsky District of Chelyabinsk Oblast, Russia, located in the valley of the Sim River at its confluence with the Minyar River, 370 kilometers (230 mi) west of Chelyabinsk, the administrative center of the oblast. Population: 10,194 (2010 census); 11,032 (2002 census); 12,930 (1989 Soviet census).

== History ==
It was founded in 1771. Town status was granted to it on May 14, 1943.

== Administrative and municipal status ==
Within the framework of administrative divisions, it is, together with one rural locality (the settlement of Volkovo), incorporated within Ashinsky District as the Town of Minyar. As a municipal division, the Town of Minyar is incorporated within Ashinsky Municipal District as Minyarskoye Urban Settlement.
