= Tigireksky Nature Reserve =

Strict nature reserve in Altai Krai, Russia

Tigirekskiy Nature Reserve
- Russian: Тигирекский заповедник (Also: Tigireksky)
- IUCN category Ia (strict nature reserve)
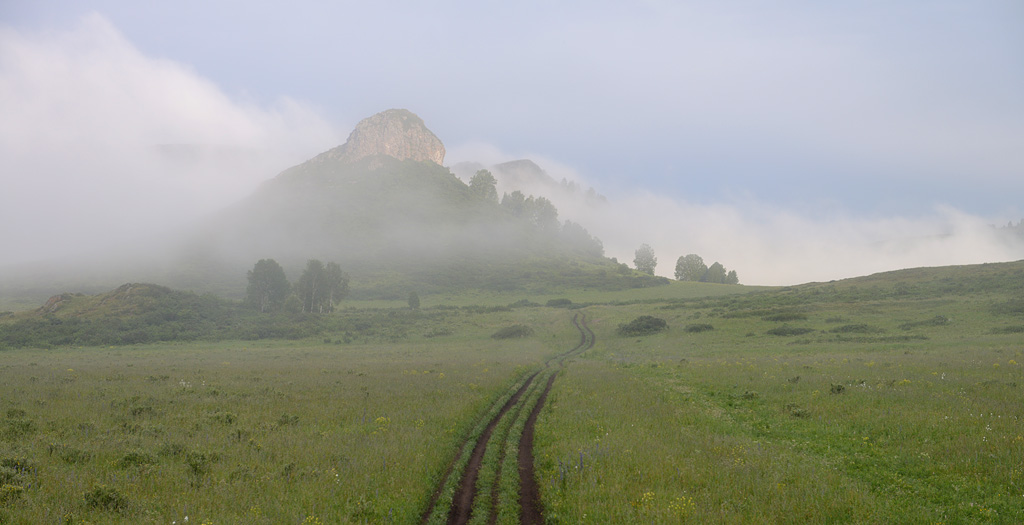
- Shlyapnaya Mountain, in Tigirekskiy Zapovednik

- Location within Russia
- Location: Altai Krai
- Nearest city: Barnaul
- Coordinates: 51°00′N 82°55′E
- Area: 40,693 hectares (100,555 acres; 157 sq mi)
- Established: 1999
- Governing body: Ministry of Natural Resources and Environment (Russia)
- Website: http://tigirek.ru//

Tigirekskiy Nature Reserve (Russian: Тигирекский заповедник) (also Tigireksky) is a Russian 'zapovednik' (strict nature reserve) in the northwest mid-level mountains of the Altai-Sayan region. The reserve was established for the protection and study of the relic pre-glacial dark taiga of the higher elevations, and the mountain-steppe of the river valleys and lower regions. The site features extensive karst landscape and caves. The reserve is situated in the Zmeinogorsky, Tretyakovsky and Krasnoshchyokovsky districts of Altai Krai. It was formally established in 1999, and covers a total area of 40,693 ha (157.12 sq mi).

== Topography ==
The Tigirekskiy Reserve occupies the watershed of the right tributaries of the Charysh River and the headwaters of the Aley River, including the Tigerksky range of mountains, in the northwest of the Altai-Sayan mountains. The terrain is mostly mid-level mountains with domed tops. The river valleys are deep with steep, precipitous sides.

- Beloretsk The upper reaches of the river White. Located in Zmeinogorsky District.
- Tigireksky Adjacent to the village from the south Tigirek. Located in Krasnoshchyokovsky District.
- Hanharinsky The upper reaches of the river Big Hanhara. Located in Krasnoshchyokovsky District.

The reserve is bounded on the south by the northwest border of Kazakhstan; the region to the north stretches into steppe, and the higher Altai mountains are the east. Altitudes in the reserve run from 500 meters to 2,000 meters, the highest peak is the top of Tigireksky Ridge (2,013 m (6,604 ft)). The north and western sections of the reserve are lower and smoother; the high ridges in the east have more rocky terrain at high altitudes.

== Climate and Ecoregion ==
Tigirekskiy is located in the Kazakh forest steppe ecoregion, a steppe region with long ""ribbon forests"" of pine; about 300–500 miles more northerly than the European Russian forest. This ecoregion has more wetlands and more continental climate than the European forest steppe.

The climate of Tigirekskiy is Humid continental climate, warm summer (Köppen climate classification (Dfb)). This climate is characterized by large swings in temperature, both diurnally and seasonally, with mild summers and cold, snowy winters. The average temperature in January is −14 °C (7 °F), and 17 °C (63 °F) in July. The site has high humidity (600 to 800 mm of rain per year), with precipitation roughly equal between warm and cold periods of the year.

== Flora and fauna ==
There are two general types of plant communities in Tigireksky: forest-steppe in the north and west on smooth domed mountains, and dark taiga along the Tigirek Ridge. There are small areas at high altitude of sub-alpine meadows. The dark taiga (spruce and fir) is a relic of the pre-glacial period. Siberian rown is common brush in the forest-steppe area. Scientists on the reserve have recorded 811 species of vascular plants.

The reserve hosts the full range of western Altai dark taiga and forest-steppe animals: 67 species of mammal have reported on the site. Common mammals are the brown bear, red deer, roe deer, moose and especially hare. The population of beaver has grown, with resulting ponds and change to streams. In the steppe-like areas in the north of the reserve, wild boars are established. All 11 species of bat known to live in the Altai region are found in the caves around the village of Tigirek. Common birds include the forest grouse, black grouse, common nutcrackers, and many types of owl. At the sub-alpine levels, Ptarmigan are common. Scientists on the reserve have recorded 142 species of birds.

== Ecoeducation and access ==
As a strict nature reserve, the Tigirekskiy Reserve is mostly closed to the general public, although scientists and those with 'environmental education' purposes can make arrangements with park management for visits. There is a public nature center in Baranovka, in the Zmeinogorsk district. There are also many 'ecotourist' routes in the reserve that are open to the public, but passes must be obtained two weeks in advance. The reserve also provides guest houses and campsites in the buffer zones around the reserve. The main office is in the city of Barnaul.

== See also ==
- List of Russian Nature Reserves (class 1a 'zapovedniks')
