= Adzhigardak =

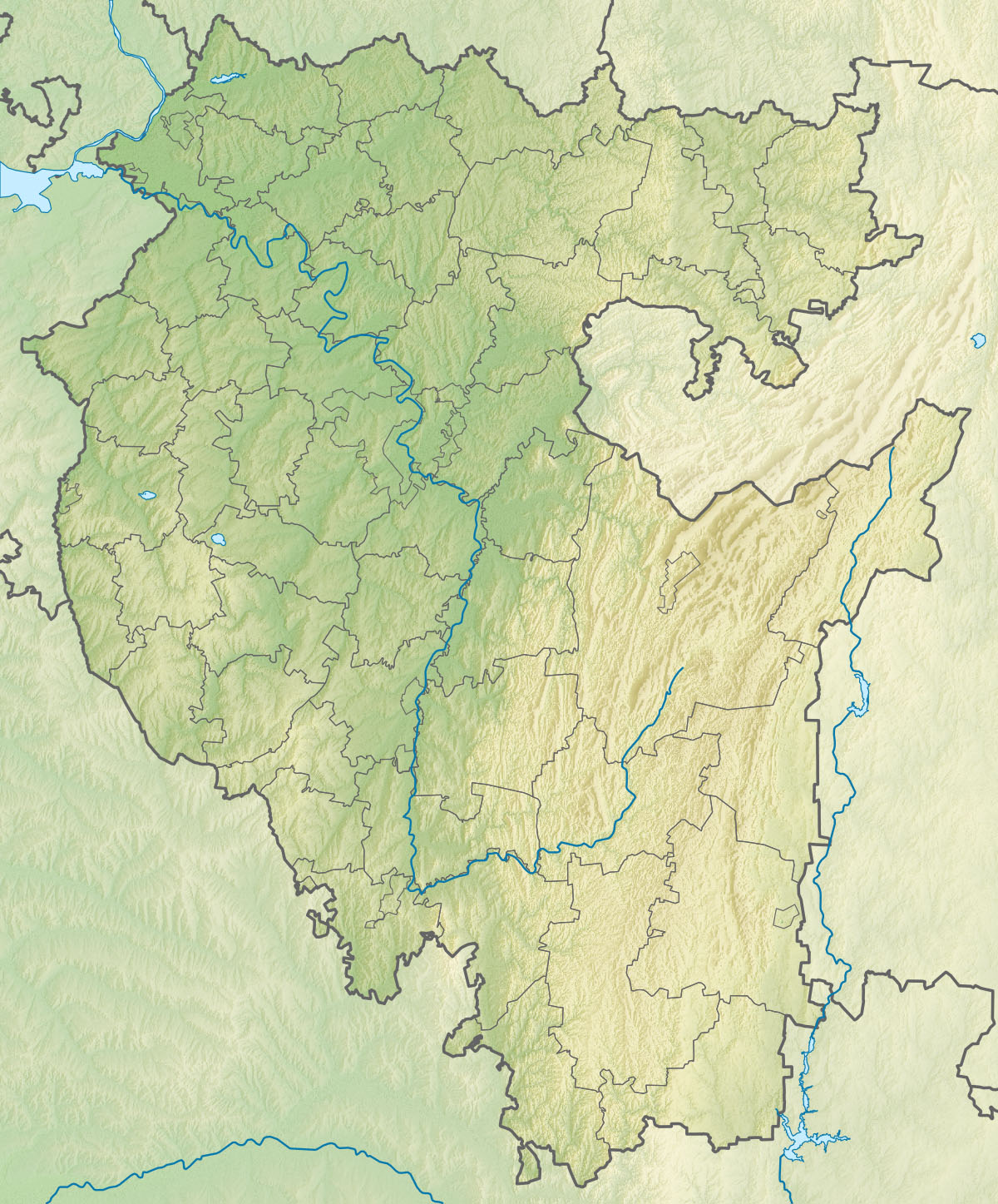
- Location within Bashkortostan Location within European Russia

Highest point
- Coordinates: 55°00′00″N 57°15′54″E

Geography
- Location: Bashkortostan, Russia
- Parent range: Southern Ural

Adzhigardak is the name of a mountain in south Urals near Asha (town) on the border of Chelyabinsk oblast and Bashkiria, Russia, and of a ski resort based on it.
