= Kazakh Steppe =

Steppe region in Kazakhstan

Coordinates: 52.896°N 71.650°E

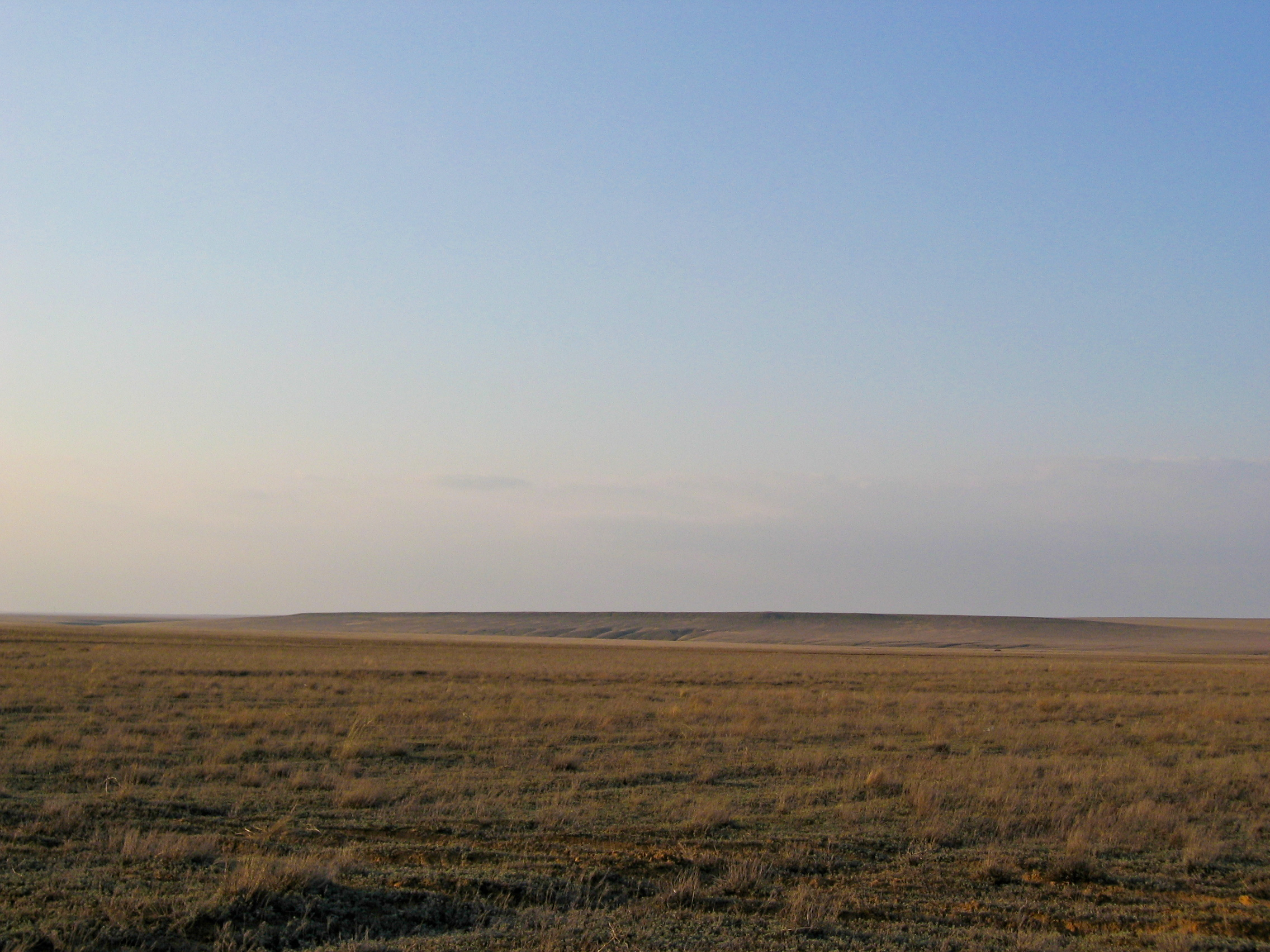

- Ecoregion territory (in purple); WWF ID# PA0810

Ecology
- Realm: Palearctic
- Biome: Temperate grasslands, savannas, and shrublands

Geography
- Area: 804,450 km^{2} (310,600 mi^{2})
- Countries: Kazakhstan and Russia

The Kazakh Steppe (Kazakh: Қазақ даласы, romanized: Qazaq dalasy [qɑˈzɑq dɑɫɑˈsə]), also known as the Great Steppe or Great Dala (Kazakh: Ұлы дала, romanized: Ūly dala [ʊˈɫɤ dɑˈɫɑ]), is a vast region of open grassland in Central Asia, covering areas in northern Kazakhstan and adjacent areas of Russia. It lies east of the Pontic–Caspian steppe and west of the Emin Valley steppe, with which it forms the central and western part of the Eurasian steppe. The Kazakh Steppe is an ecoregion of the temperate grasslands, savannas, and shrublands biome in the Palearctic realm. Before the mid-19th century, it was called the Kirghiz steppe, 'Kirghiz' being an old Russian word for the Kazakhs.

== Setting ==
The steppe extends more than 2,200 km (1,400 mi) from the east of the Caspian Depression and north of the Aral Sea, all the way to the Altai Mountains. It is the largest dry steppe region on earth, covering approximately 804,450 km^{2} (310,600 sq mi). The Kazakh Steppe lies at the southern end of the Ural Mountains, the traditional dividing line between Europe and Asia. Much of the steppe is considered to be semi-desert, grading into desert as one goes further south. The Turan Lowland lies in the southwestern part of the steppe, but elevation increases as one travels east or to the northern parts of the steppe, with a few exceptions.

The Pontic Steppe lies to the west and northwest. To the north and northeast of the Kazakh Steppe lies the Kazakh forest steppe, an ecoregion of pine groves interspersed with grasslands that forms a transition between the Kazakh steppe and the forests of Siberia. To the south lies the Kazakh semi-desert and the Kazakh upland ecoregions. The Kokshetau Massif in north-central Kazakhstan harbors an enclave of the Kazakh upland, distinct from the Kazakh steppe which surrounds it at lower elevations.

=== Climate ===
The region has a semi-arid, continental climate. Most of the area falls under the cool semi-arid (BSk) classification under the Köppen climate classification system, although the moister north is classed as humid continental (Dfa/Dfb). The steppe receives between 200 and 400 millimetres (8 and 16 in) of precipitation in an average year, with more falling in the northern areas. Average maximum temperatures range from 20 to 26 °C (68.0 to 78.8 °F) in July, and from −12 to −18 °C (10.4 to −0.4 °F) in January. Very high winds sweep across the plains at times.

Climate data for Astana
Month	Jan	Feb	Mar	Apr	May	Jun	Jul	Aug	Sep	Oct	Nov	Dec	Year
Record high °C (°F)	4 (39)	5 (41)	22 (72)	30 (86)	36 (97)	40 (104)	42 (108)	39 (102)	36 (97)	27 (81)	19 (66)	5 (41)	42 (108)
Mean daily maximum °C (°F)	−12 (10)	−11 (12)	−4 (25)	9 (48)	19 (66)	25 (77)	27 (81)	24 (75)	18 (64)	8 (46)	−2 (28)	−9 (16)	7 (45)
Daily mean °C (°F)	−15 (5)	−15 (5)	−9 (16)	5 (41)	13 (55)	19 (66)	21 (70)	18 (64)	12 (54)	4 (39)	−6 (21)	−12 (10)	3 (37)
Mean daily minimum °C (°F)	−21 (−6)	−21 (−6)	−15 (5)	−2 (28)	5 (41)	11 (52)	13 (55)	11 (52)	5 (41)	−1 (30)	−11 (12)	−18 (0)	−3 (27)
Record low °C (°F)	−52 (−62)	−49 (−56)	−38 (−36)	−28 (−18)	−11 (12)	−2 (28)	2 (36)	−2 (28)	−8 (18)	−26 (−15)	−39 (−38)	−44 (−47)	−52 (−62)
Average precipitation mm (inches)	22 (0.9)	14 (0.6)	19 (0.7)	21 (0.8)	31 (1.2)	40 (1.6)	50 (2.0)	37 (1.5)	26 (1.0)	27 (1.1)	20 (0.8)	22 (0.9)	327 (12.9)

== Flora ==
Because of low rainfall, the steppe has few trees, and consists of mostly grasslands and large, sandy areas. Typical vegetation includes feathergrass (Stipa), wormwood (Artemisia (genus)), and fescue (Festuca). In parts of the steppe, woody plant encroachment is observed.

== Fauna ==
Animals that can be found in the steppes of Kazakhstan include the Saiga antelope, Siberian roe deer, wolves, foxes, badgers, Mongolian gerbils, and steppe tortoises.

== People ==
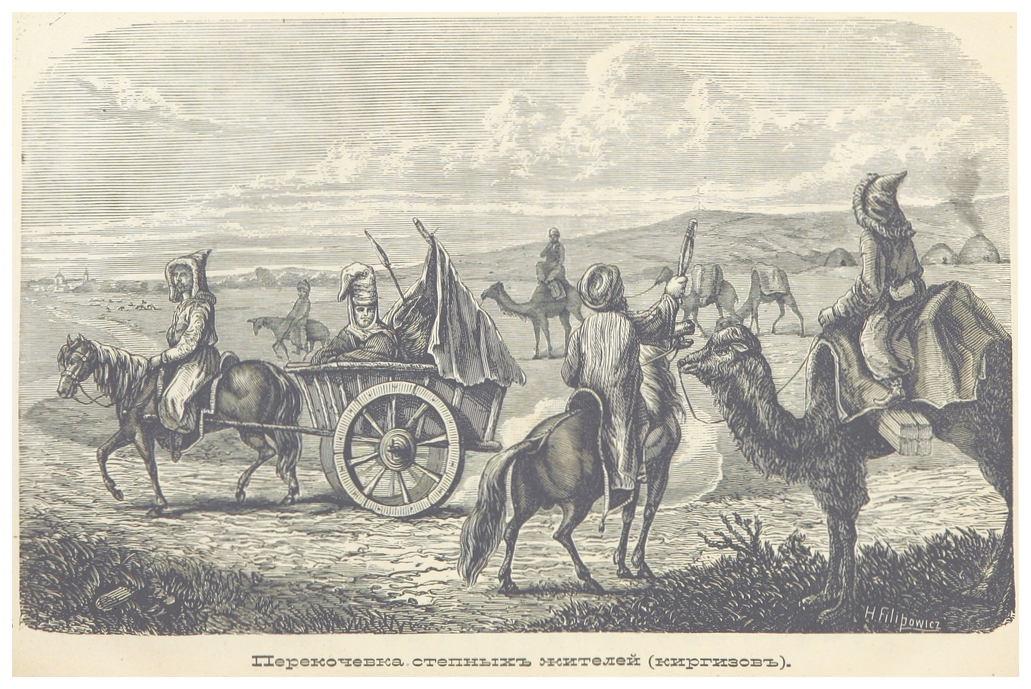
Kazakh nomads

The western part of the Kazakh Steppe is very sparsely populated, with between two and three people per 1 km^{2} (0.39 sq mi). As one heads east across the plains, the population density increases to between four and seven people per 1 km^{2} (0.39 sq mi). Kazakh people make up the majority of the people living in the area. Russia leases approximately 7,360 km^{2} (2,840 sq mi) in the southern region of the steppe for the world's oldest space launch facility, Baikonur Cosmodrome.

== In popular culture ==
The movie Tulpan was shot and set in the Kazakh Steppe.

== See also ==
- Saryarka — Steppe and Lakes of Northern Kazakhstan
- Steppe Route
- List of ecoregions in Russia
- Mongolian-Manchurian grassland
