= Sim (river) =

River in Russia

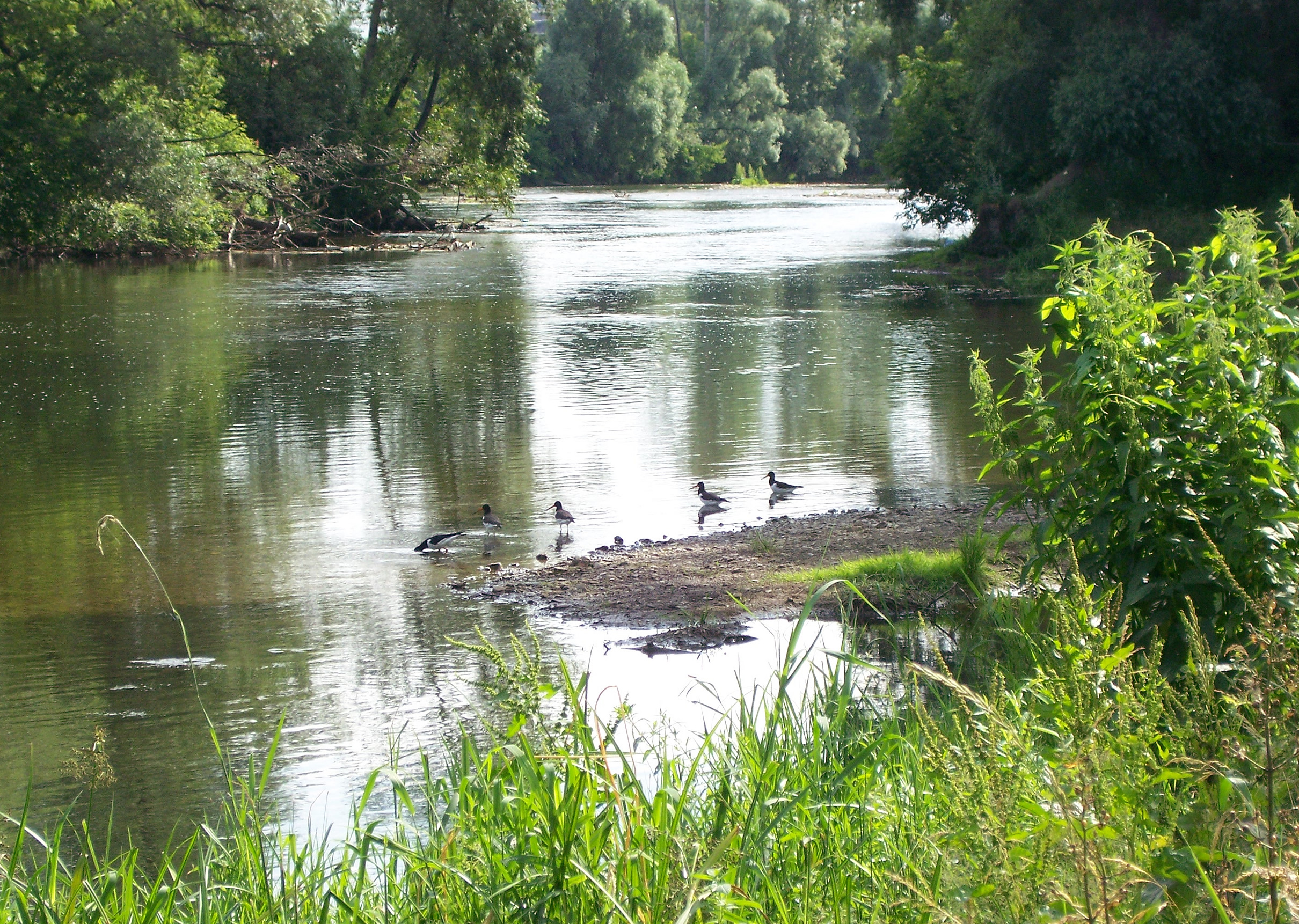
- Oystercatcher on the Sim River in the city Asha

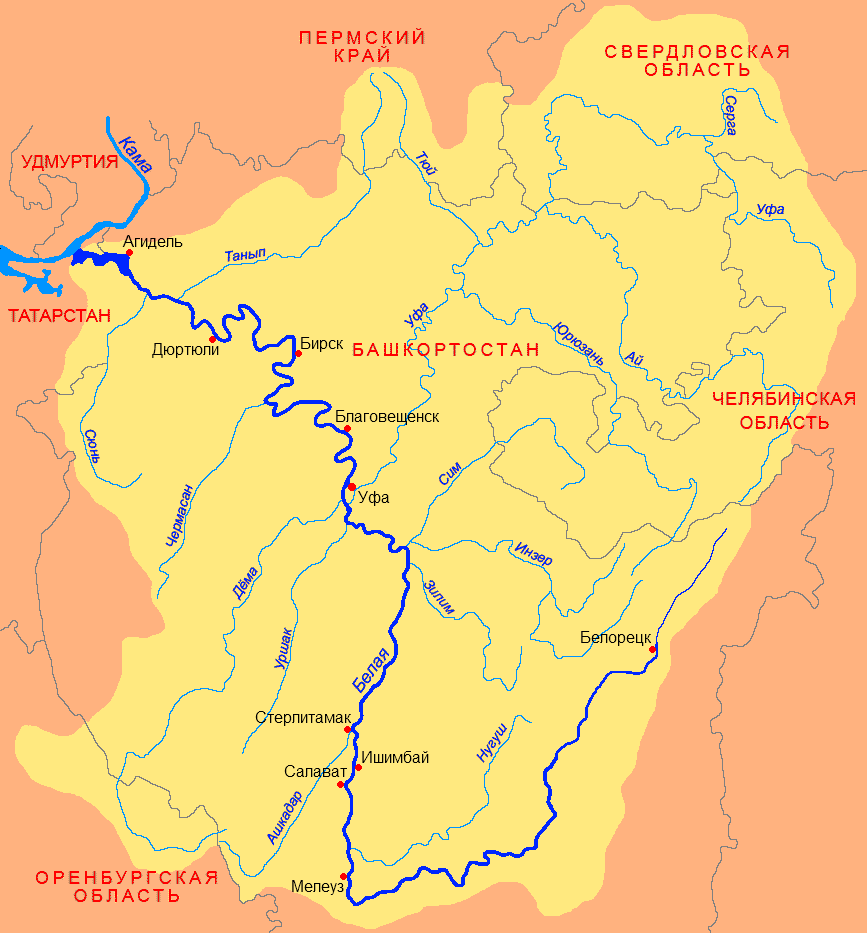
- Belaya basin

Location
- Country: Chelyabinsk Oblast and the Republic of Bashkortostan, Russia

Physical characteristics
- Source
  - location: Southern Ural Mountains
  - elevation: 630 m (2,070 ft)
- Mouth: Belaya
  - coordinates: 54°29′07″N 56°26′14″E
- Length: 239 km (149 mi)
- Basin size: 11,700 km^{2} (4,500 sq mi)
- Discharge
  - average: 47.9 m^{3}/s (1,690 cu ft/s) (103 km from the mouth)

Basin features
- Progression: Belaya→ Kama→ Volga→ Caspian Sea

The Sim (Bashkir: Эҫем, Eśem; Russian: Сим) is a river in Chelyabinsk Oblast and the Republic of Bashkortostan in Russia. It is a tributary of the Belaya, part of the Volga watershed. Its length is 239 kilometers (149 mi), and its drainage basin covers 11,700 square kilometres (4,500 mi^{2}).

The river has its sources in the southern Ural Mountains. It first flows in a north-northwesterly direction towards the towns of Sim and Minyar, before turning towards the west and then southwest. After passing the town of Asha the Sim crosses the border of Bashkortostan and continues towards the southwest and its confluence with the Belaya.

Ignateva Cave lies on its banks.

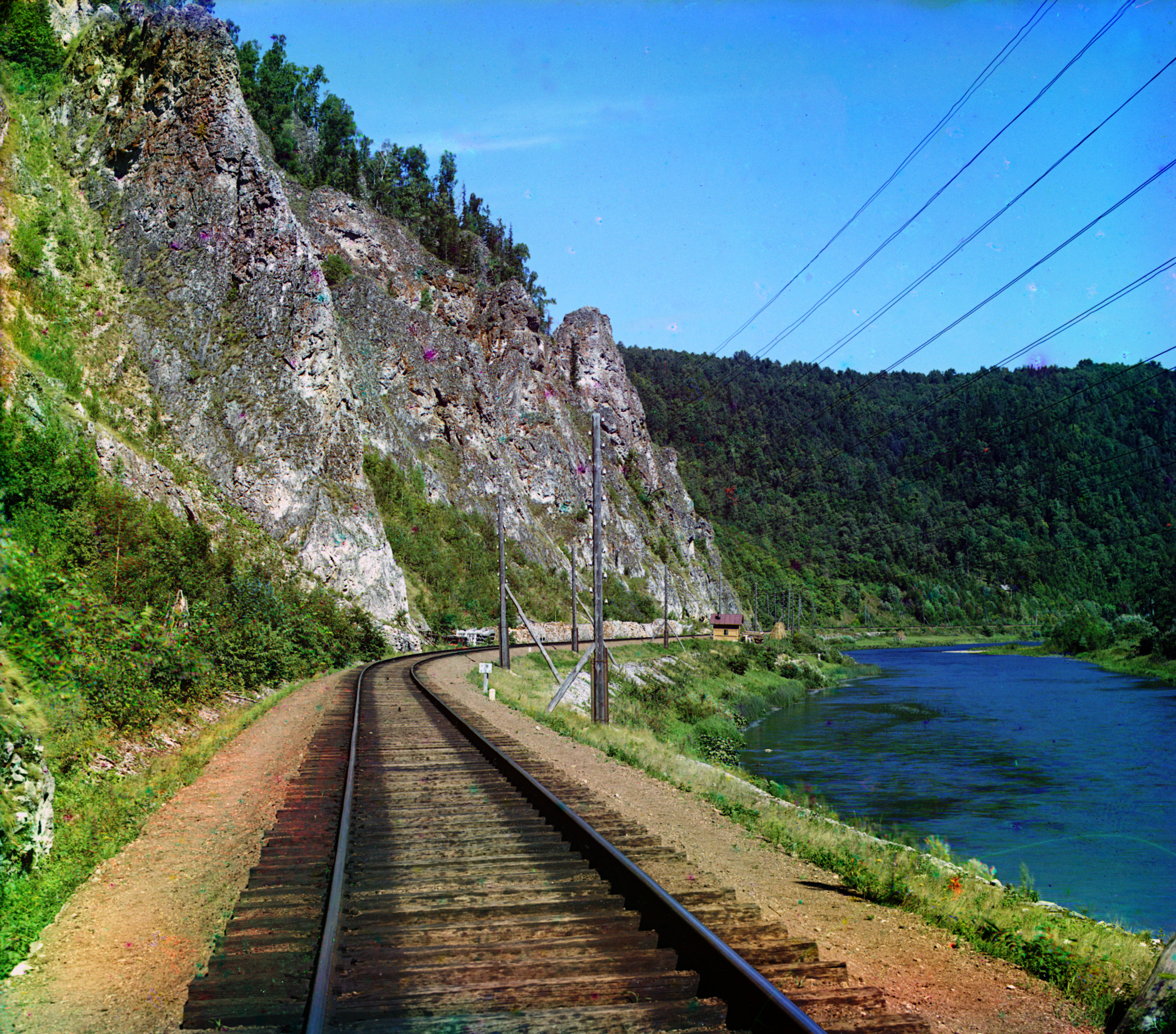
On the Sim River. Photo by Sergey Prokudin-Gorsky, 1910
