= Ilmensky Nature Reserve =

Nature reserve in Chelyabinsk Oblast, Russia

Ilmen Nature Reserve
- Russian: Ильменский заповедник (Also: Ilmensky)
- IUCN category Ia (strict nature reserve)
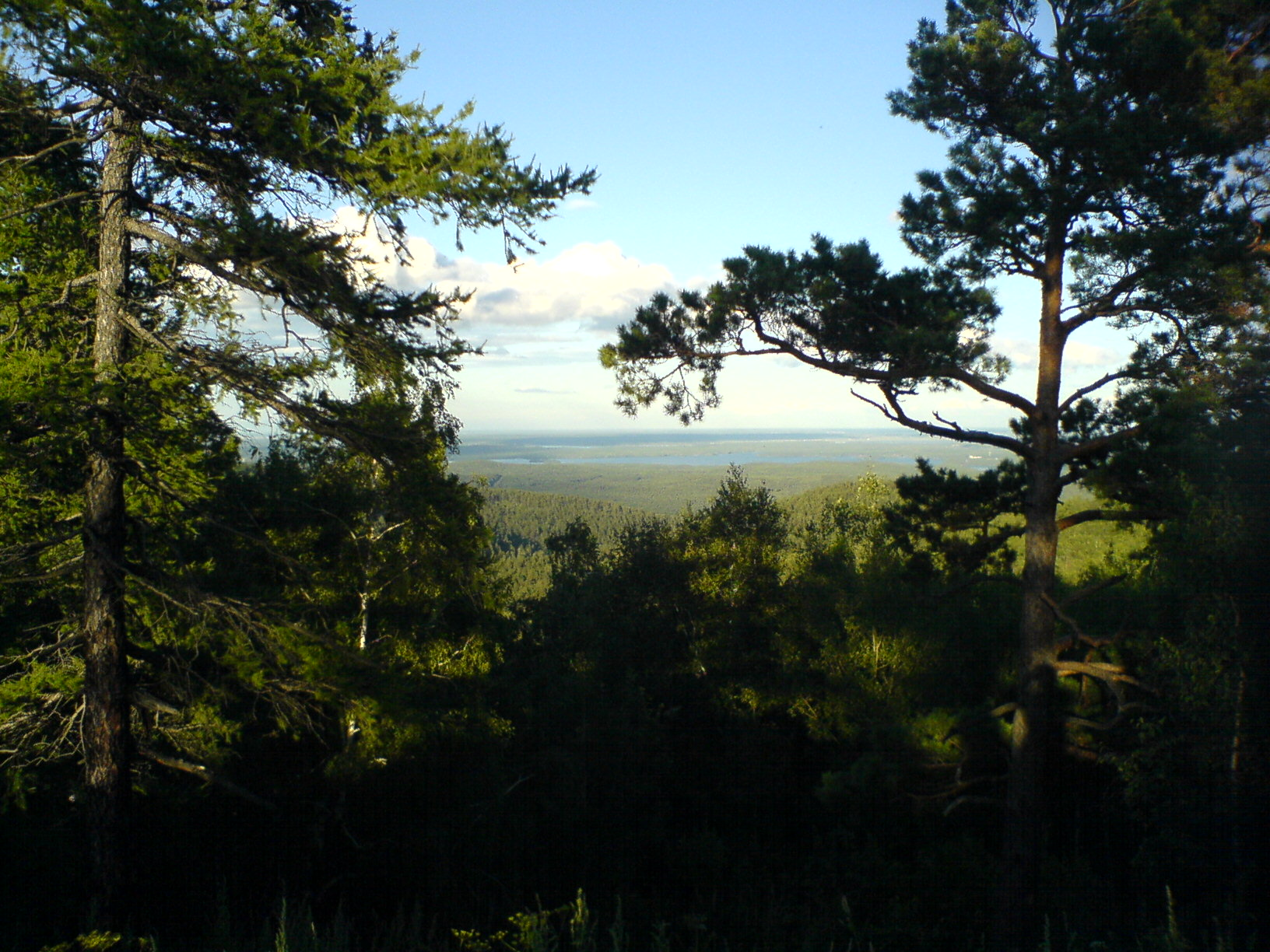
- Ilmen Zapovednik

- Location within Russia
- Location: Chelyabinsk Oblast
- Nearest city: Miass
- Coordinates: 55°0′55″N 60°9′32″E
- Area: 34,380 hectares (84,955 acres; 133 sq mi)
- Established: 1920
- Governing body: Ministry of Natural Resources and Environment (Russia)
- Website: http://igz.ilmeny.ac.ru/

Ilmensky Nature Reserve (Russian: Ильменский заповедник) is a Russian zapovednik (strict nature reserve) that was created by decree of Vladimir Lenin in 1920 as a mineralogical nature reserve. The reserve is situated just north and east of the city of Miass, in the Chebarkulsky District of Chelyabinsk Oblast. It is 20 km east of Taganay National Park and 75 km west of Chelyabinsk.

It is the type locality (i.e. local of discovery) of 17 minerals including ilmenite, cancrinite, amphibole-supergroup minerals (e.g., ferri-winchite and fluoro-richterite), rare-earth minerals (e.g., monazite-(Ce) and chevkinite-(Ce)), and niobium–rare-earth minerals (e.g., aeschynite-(Ce) and samarskite-(Y)). There have been over 400 mines in the area over the years. The reserve's geological museum is one of the largest in Russia.

The forest cover is pine and larch forest on low hills of the Ilmensky Mountains and foothill ridges on east side of the south Ural Mountains. The Ignatievka Cave with ancient cave paintings has been a branch of the reserve since 1983. Another branch is the archaeological site of Arkaim and its associated sites.

== Topography ==
The Ilmensky Reserve is located on the east slope of the southern Urals, where the terrain flattens from low mountains (400 meters altitude) to a district of lakes and rolling hills. The reserve is rectangular in shape, 70 km from north to south, and 10 km from west to east. The Miass River runs north–south along the west border of the reserve. The highest point, Ilmen Tau, is 750 meters above sea level.

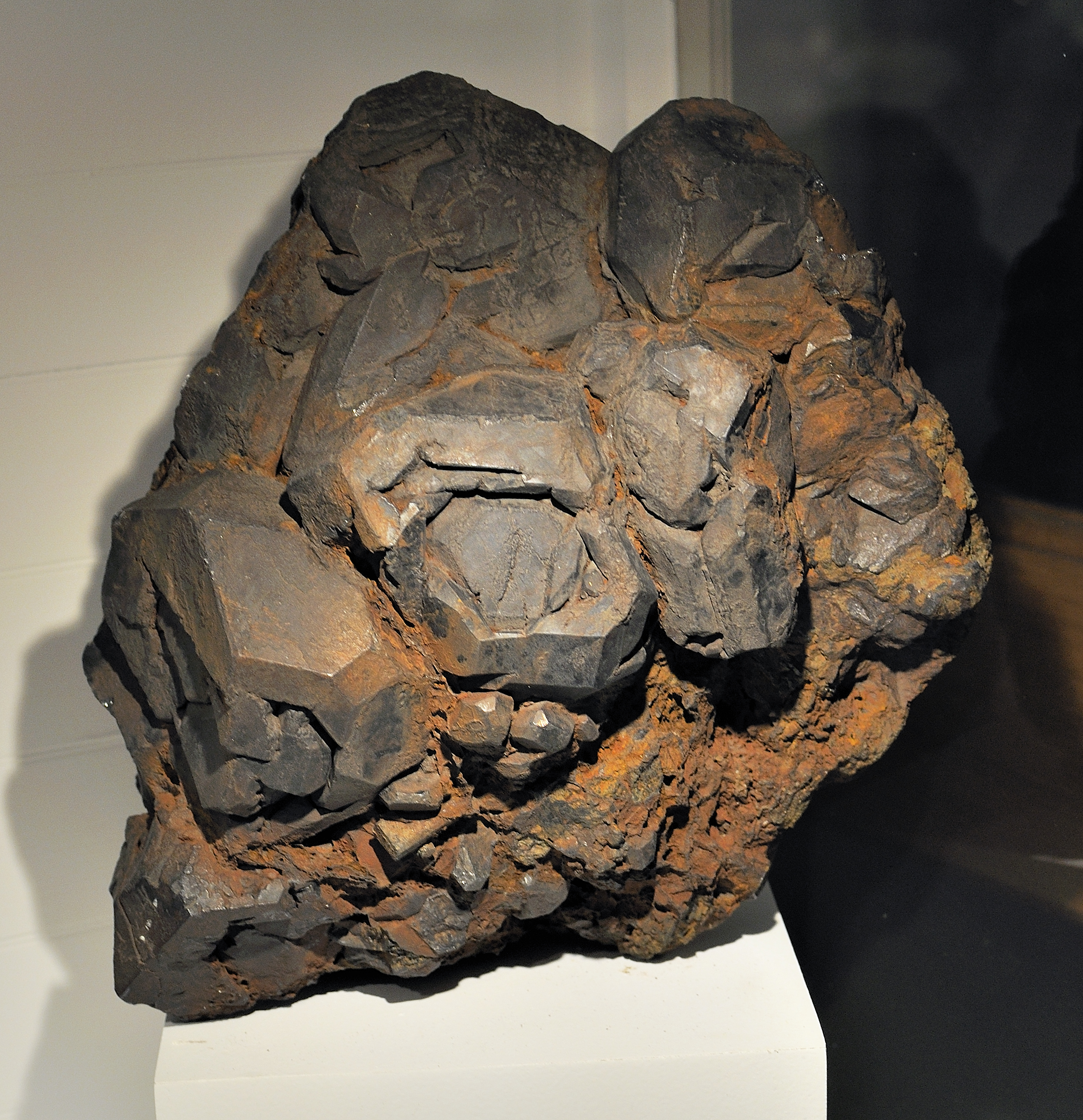
Ilmenite, the most important Titanium ore, was first discovered on the site of the Ilmen Reserve

The geology is a complex assortment of igneous and metamorphic rock. The granitic formations contain many pegmatite veins with associated minerals. The reserve has recorded 278 species of minerals, and 70 kinds of rock.

== Climate and Ecoregion ==
Ilmen is located in the Kazakh forest steppe ecoregion. Steppe with long ""ribbon forests"" of pine; about 300–500 miles more northerly than the European Russian forest. This ecoregion has more wetlands and more continental climate than the European forest steppe.

The climate of Ilmen is Humid continental climate, warm summer (Köppen climate classification (Dfb)). This climate is characterized by large swings in temperature, both diurnally and seasonally, with mild summers and cold, snowy winters. Rainfall varies from 500 to 800 mm per year, peaking in the summer. Snow reaches a depth of 1 meter, with snow cover averaging 195 days. The frost-free period lasts 80–90 days.

== Flora and fauna ==
The dark taiga is to the west, on the mountain ridges; Ilmen is more in a pine and birch forest subzone. Forests cover 85% of the Reserve - of which 55% is pine (Pinus sylvestris), and about 40% birch. The remaining 5% is mostly meadow, and steppe. Because 9% of the reserve is lake and river, the surrounding floodplains and dead birch trees provide a good habitat for mushrooms which are an object of study at the site. Throughout the reserves history, the mammals and birds of the region have been the subject of frequent scientific publication.

== Ecotourism ==
As a strict nature reserve, the Ilmen Reserve is mostly closed to the general public, although scientists and those with 'environmental education' purposes can make arrangements with park management for visits. Other members of the public seeking access must apply to the main office in the city of Miass.

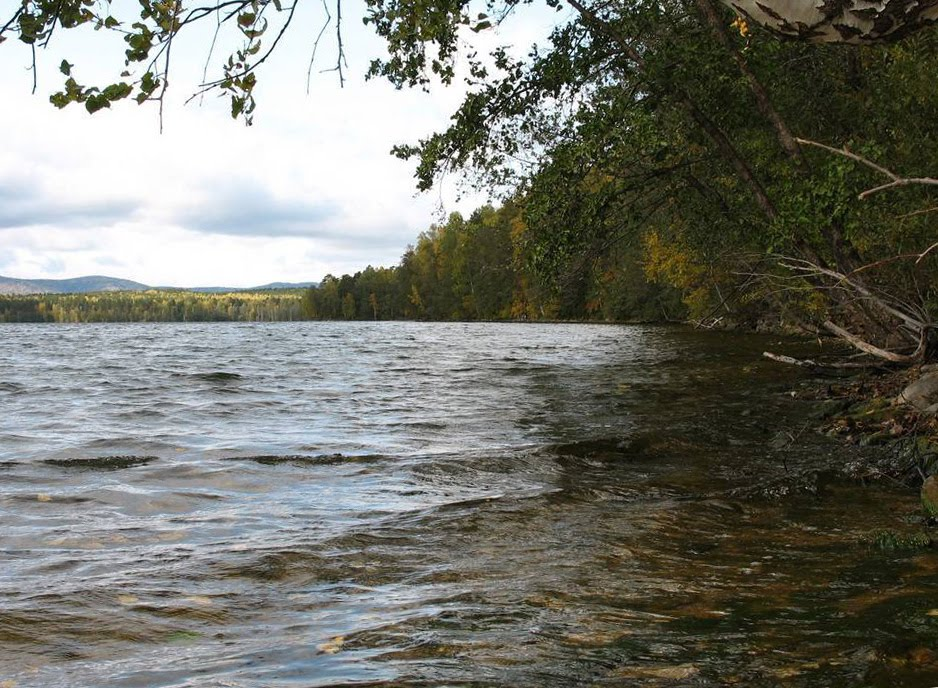
Ilmen Reserve (left distance) is on the west shore of Lake Bolshoy Kisegach

== Mineralogical Museum ==
The Reserve's Natural Science Museum in the city of Miass, created in 1925, is one of the five largest Russian geological-mineralogical museums. It is housed in a three-story building, with six rooms and a total area of 2,050 m2. The Museum Foundation has 30 thousand units of storage, with 9000 on exhibit. The museum is a major regional center of education in the natural sciences, receiving 50 thousand visitors per year.

== See also ==
- List of Russian Nature Reserves (class 1a 'zapovedniks')
