= Kinderle Cave =

- 30-летия Победы, Киндерлинская (Russian), Киндерле (Bashkir)
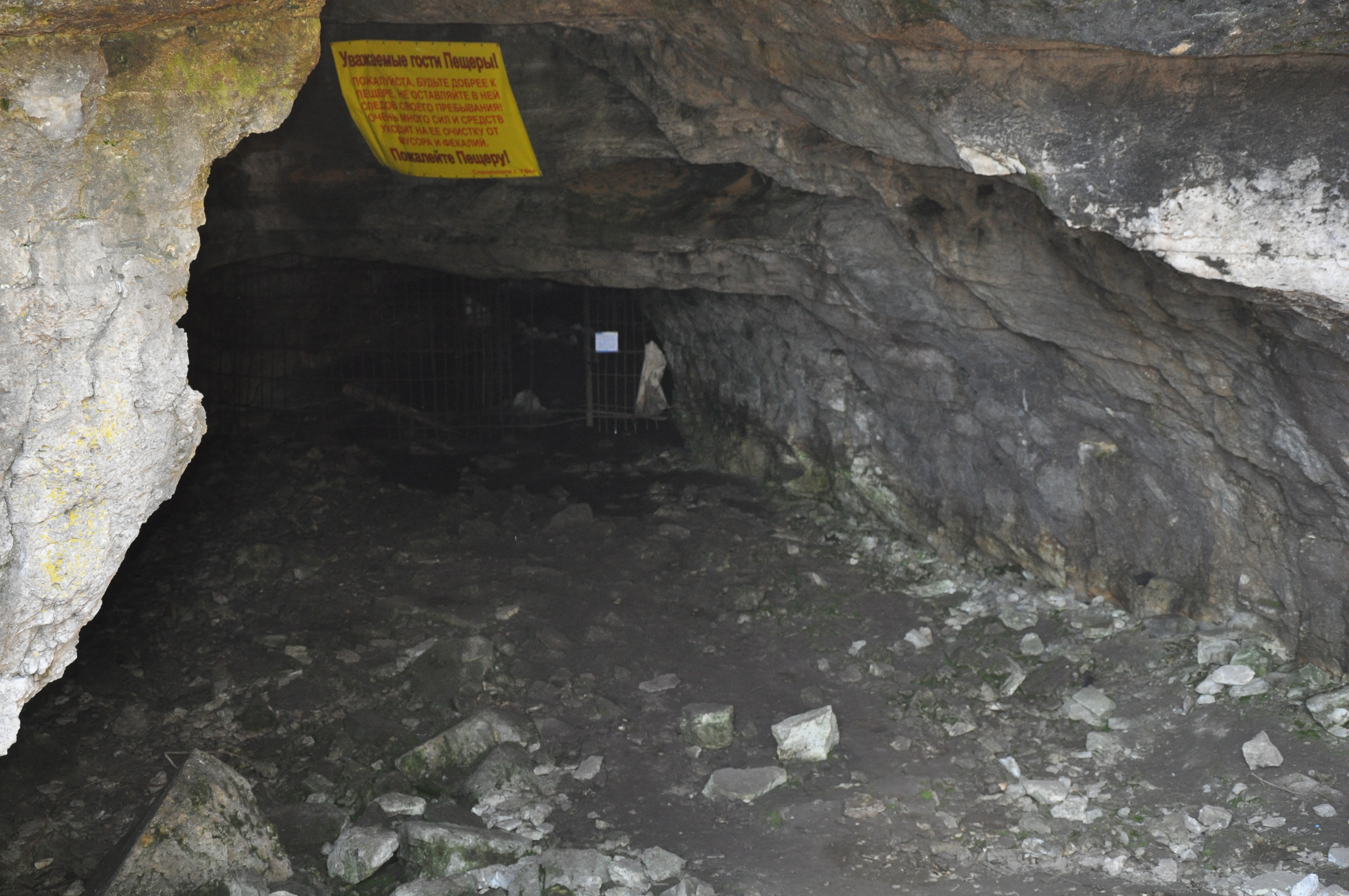
- Kinderle cave entrance

- Location in Russia
- 54°09′25″N 56°51′16″E
- Type: limestone cave
- Periods: Devonian
- Location: Gafuriysky District
- Region: Bashkortostan, Russia

Kinderle Cave (Russian: 30-летия Победы, Киндерлинская, Bashkir: Киндерле) is the second longest cave in the Southern Urals. It is located on the territory of the Zilim Nature Park, 5 km from the village of Tashasti on the right bank of the Kinderle River in Bashkortostan, Russia. The cave was formed in the Devonian period and consists of 4 horizontal floors.

The entrance to the cave is located at an altitude of 94 m and is connected to an inclined tunnel. In the tunnel is a glacier measuring 720 square m and a thickness of 8 m. Various stalagmites grow on the glacier. The length of the cave is 8130 m, including 230 m under water. The volume of the cave is 229600 cubic meters, the floor area is 39400 square meters. The average width of the pass is 5.4 m, the height is 7.1 m. The amplitude of the corridors is 215 m, this is the deepest cave in the Urals. Around the cave grows cannabis, so the Bashkirs called the cave Kinderle. They kept meat on the glacier in the summer.

In 1974 the cave was studied by speleologists and the honor of celebrating the 30th anniversary of the victory over Nazi Germany, the cave was named Victory Cave (Russian: Пещера Победа).

It is known that there are 67 caves on the territory of Zilim Nature Park. The most famous of them is the Kinderle Cave. The cave is visited by thousands of tourists every year. In 2010 a metal fence was installed to stabilize the ecological situation in the cave.
