= Sim, Chelyabinsk Oblast =

Sim Сим
- Town
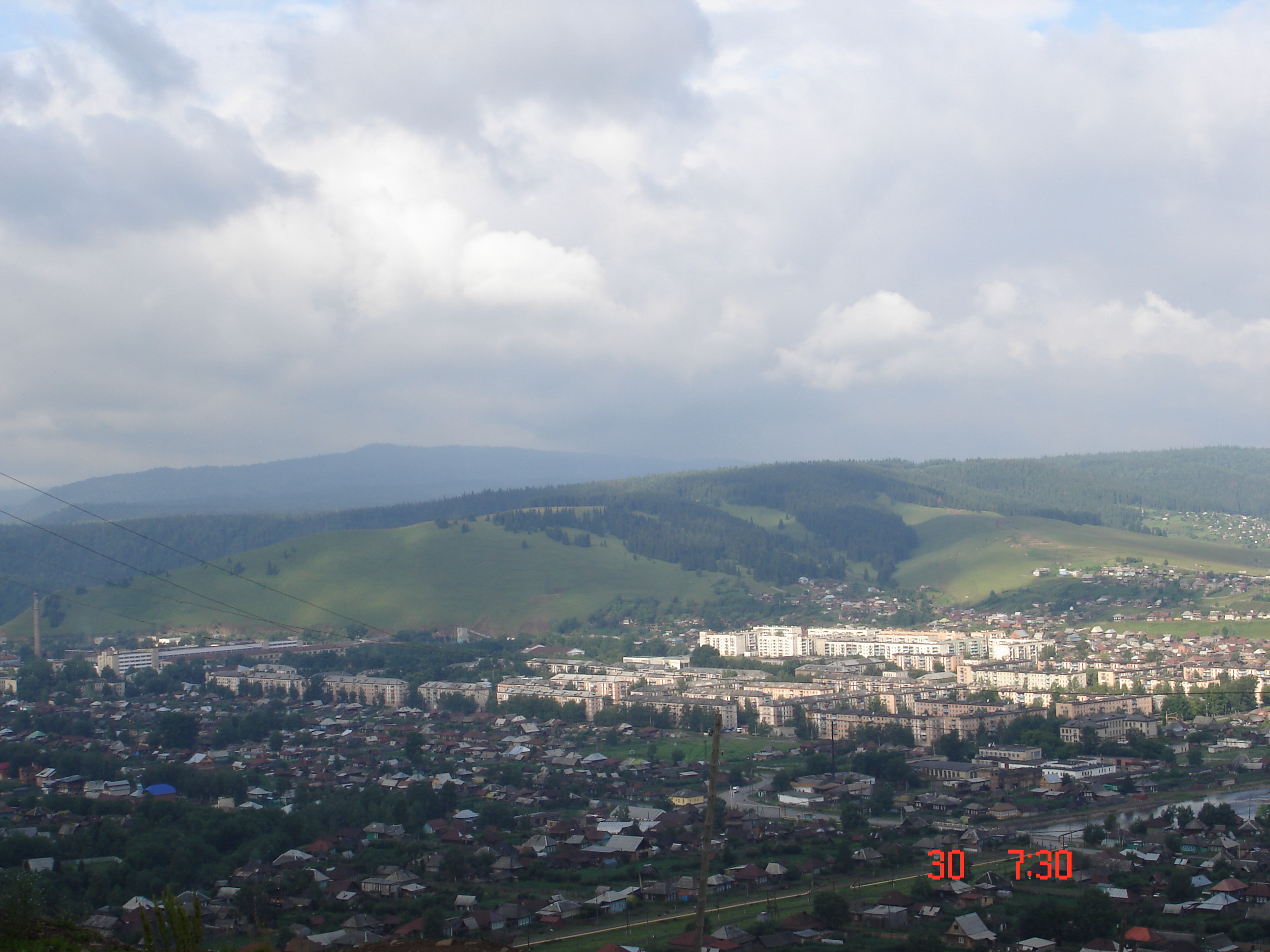
- A view of Sim.

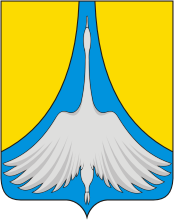
- Coat of arms
- Interactive map of Sim
- Location of Sim Sim (Chelyabinsk Oblast)
- Coordinates: 54°59′N 57°42′E
- Country: Russia
- Federal subject: Chelyabinsk Oblast
- Administrative district: Ashinsky District
- TownSelsoviet: Sim
- Founded: 1759
- Town status since: November 13, 1942
- Elevation: 200 m (660 ft)

Population (2010 Census)
  - Total: 14,466
  - Estimate (2023): 12,569 (−13.1%)

Administrative status
  - Capital of: Town of Sim

Municipal status
  - Municipal district: Ashinsky Municipal District
  - Urban settlement: Simskoye Urban Settlement
  - Capital of: Simskoye Urban Settlement
- Time zone: UTC+5 (MSK+2)
- Postal codes: 456020, 456021
- OKTMO ID: 75609105001
- Website: www.gorodsim.ru

Sim (Russian: Сим) is a town in Ashinsky District of Chelyabinsk Oblast, Russia. It is located on the Sim River, 340 kilometers (210 mi) west of Chelyabinsk and is the administrative center of the oblast. Population: 14,466 (2010 census); 16,377 (2002 census); 20,164 (1989 Soviet census).

== History ==
It was founded in 1759 and named Simsky Zavod (Си́мский Заво́д, lit. Sim's Plant). The settlement was formed around an ironworks. It was renamed Sim and granted town status on November 13, 1942.

== Administrative and municipal status ==
Within the framework of administrative divisions, it is incorporated within Ashinsky District, together with two rural localities, as the Town of Sim. As a municipal division, the Town of Sim is incorporated within Ashinsky Municipal District as Simskoye Urban Settlement.

== Notable people ==
It is the birthplace of Igor Kurchatov, a famous Soviet/Russian physicist.
