= Yermak Stone =

Coordinates: 57.3808°N 57.1210°E

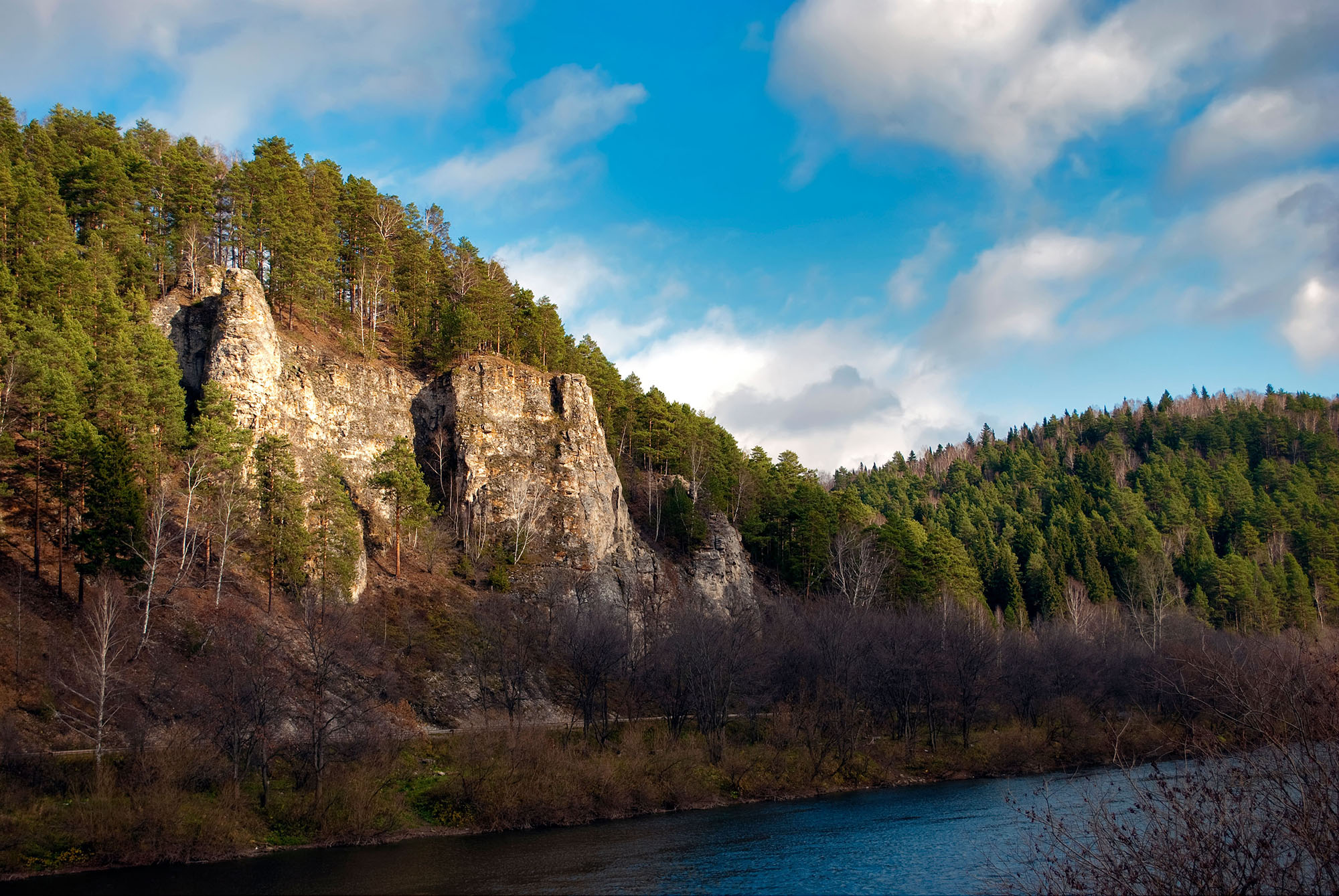
Yermak Stone, view from the left bank of the Sylva river

The Yermak Stone (Russian: Ермак-Камень) is a cliff in Kungursky District of Perm Krai, at the territory of Preduralye Reserve. It is situated at the right bank of Sylva River opposite the Chikali Station. It consists of limestone and has peaks of different height which are called Yermak, Yermachikha and Yermachonok.

Inside the rock there is a cave, where, by legends, Yermak Timofeyevich spent the winter and hid his treasures there.

Yermak Stone is a traditional place for mountain climbing competition. Every year, May 9, the Perm city competition takes place there.

== In literature ==
Yermak Stone is mentioned in the story "Boitsy" by Dmitry Mamin-Sibiryak:

Thirty-four versts from Kyn there is the Yermak Stone. It is a sheer rock twenty-five sazhens high and thirty sazhens wide. Ten sazhens above water there is a black opening of large cave gaping as a bastion gun-port. One can get into cave only from above, climbing down by a rope. According to descriptions, this cave is divided into many separate grottoes, and by legends, Yermak with his squad spent the winter there. The letter is entirely unlikely, because Yermak hadn't any reason to spend the winter there, as there are only hundred and fifty versts from Yermak Stone to Chusovskiye Gorodki. At present the Yermak Stone is of interest due to its acoustics only; a resonance happens to be remarkable here, and the rock reflects every sound several times. Every time the barge-haulers sail past Yermak Stone, they inevitable call: "Yermak, Yermak!". A loud echo repeats the word, and the barge-haulers are profoundly convinced, that Yermak answers it himself, as he was a considerable sorcerer.
