= Asha, Russia =

Asha Аша
- Town
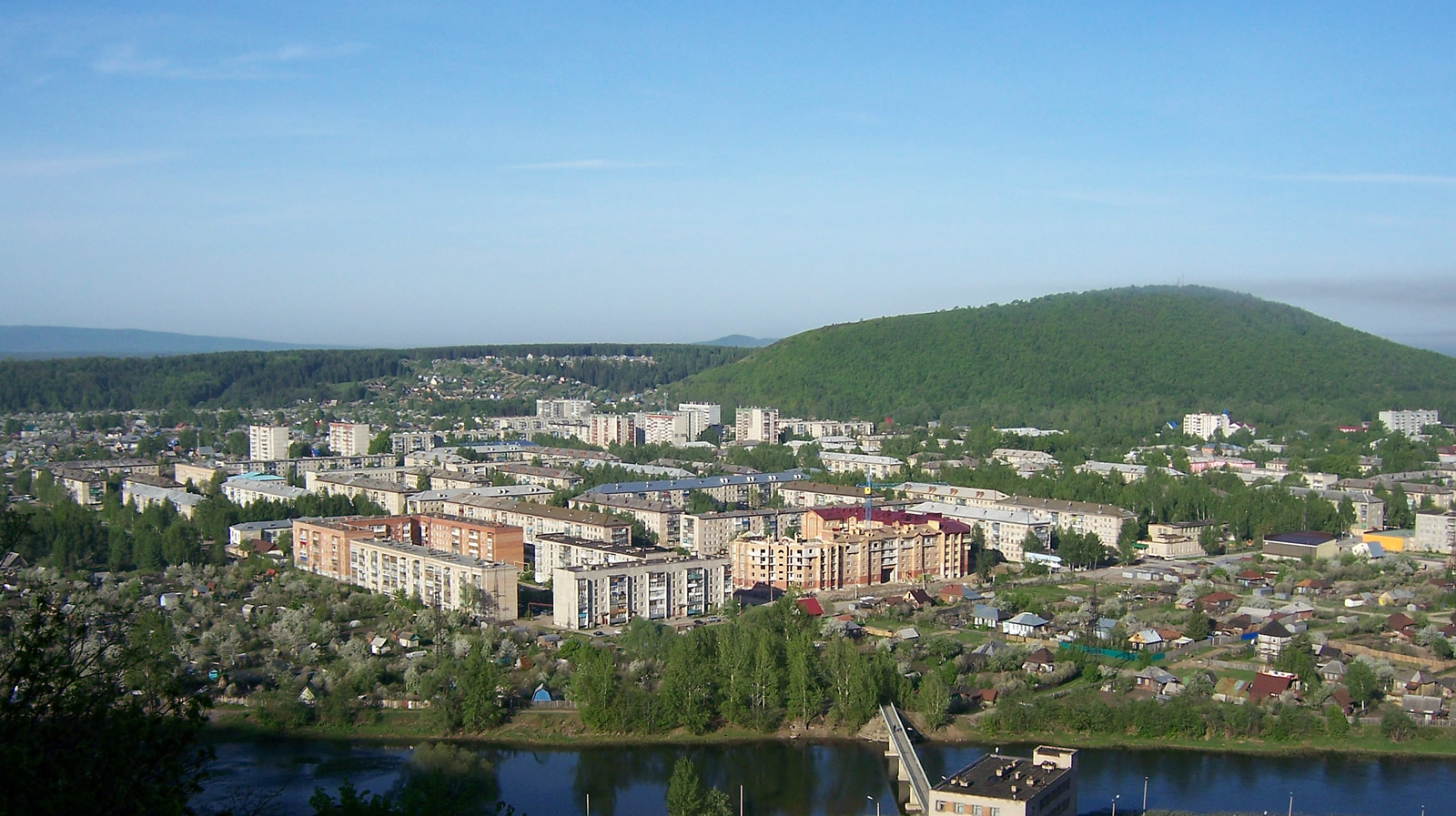
- View of Asha

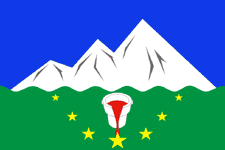
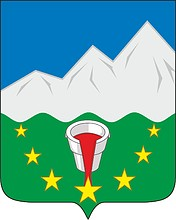
- Flag Coat of arms
- Interactive map of Asha
- Location of Asha Asha (Chelyabinsk Oblast)
- Coordinates: 55°00′N 57°16′E
- Country: Russia
- Federal subject: Chelyabinsk Oblast
- Administrative district: Ashinsky District
- TownSelsoviet: Asha
- Founded: 1898
- Town status since: June 20, 1933
- Elevation: 140 m (460 ft)

Population (2010 Census)
  - Total: 31,881
  - Estimate (2023): 27,442 (−13.9%)

Administrative status
  - Capital of: Ashinsky District, Town of Asha

Municipal status
  - Municipal district: Ashinsky Municipal District
  - Urban settlement: Ashinskoye Urban Settlement
  - Capital of: Ashinsky Municipal District, Ashinskoye Urban Settlement
- Time zone: UTC+5 (MSK+2)
- Postal codes: 456010–456012, 456014, 456015, 456019
- OKTMO ID: 75609101001
- Website: www.asha-gp.ru

Asha (Russian: Аша́) is a town and the administrative center of Ashinsky District in Chelyabinsk Oblast, Russia, located on the Sim River (a tributary of the Belaya), 377 kilometers (234 mi) west of Chelyabinsk, the administrative center of the oblast. Population: 31,881 (2010 census); 33,926 (2002 census); 38,646 (1989 Soviet census).

== History ==
It was founded in 1898 and was granted town status on June 20, 1933.

On June 4, 1989, the Ufa train disaster—a huge liquefied petroleum gas explosion that killed or injured 1,200 people—occurred near Asha.

== Administrative and municipal status ==
Within the framework of administrative divisions, Asha serves as the administrative center of Ashinsky District. As an administrative division, it is incorporated within Ashinsky District as the Town of Asha. As a municipal division, the Town of Asha is incorporated within Ashinsky Municipal District as Ashinskoye Urban Settlement.

== Sports ==
Asha is known for Adzhigardak, its ski resort.
