= Ashinsky District =

Ashinsky District Ашинский район (Russian)
- District
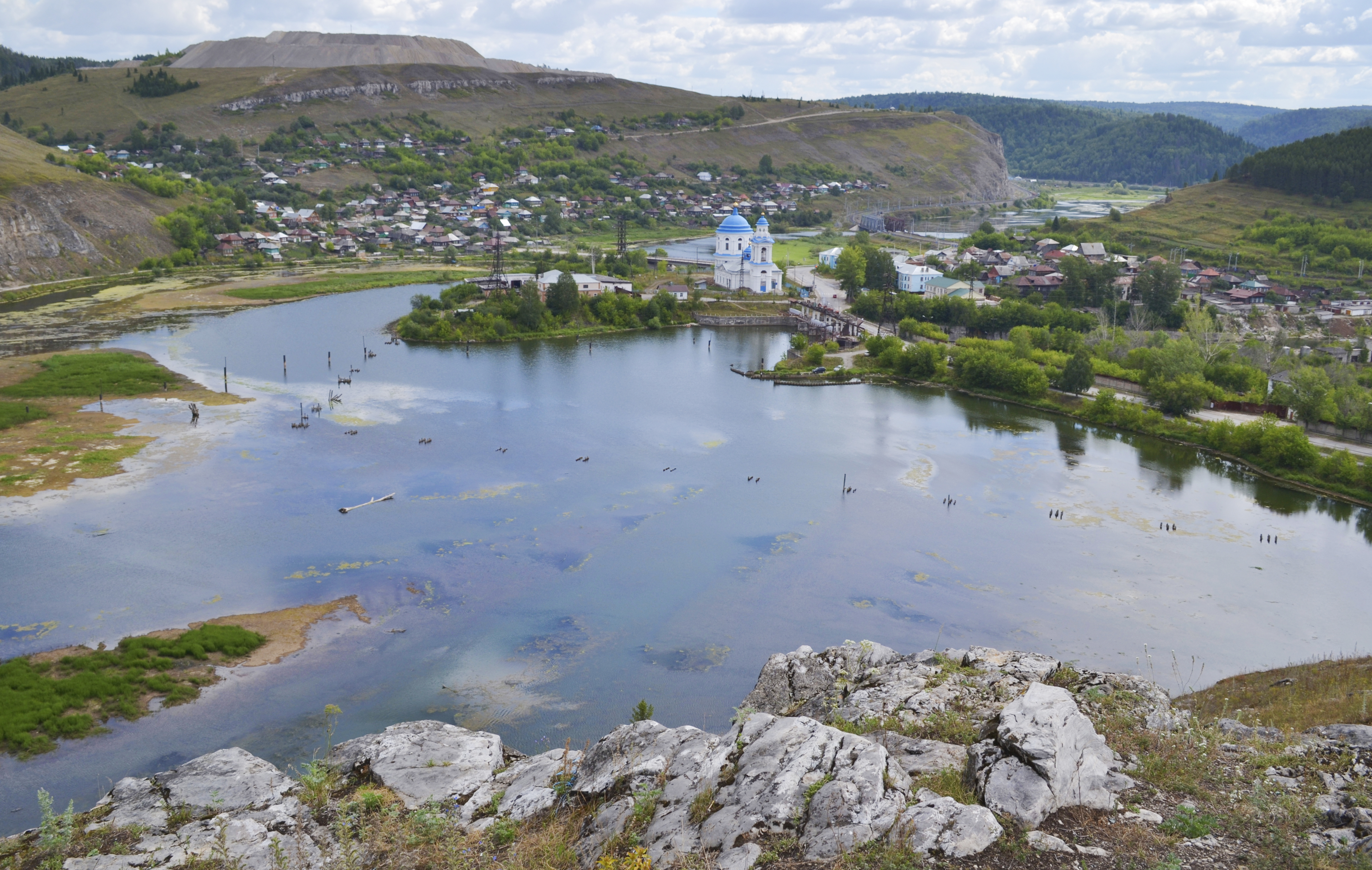
- Minyarsky Pond, a protected area of Russia in Ashinsky District

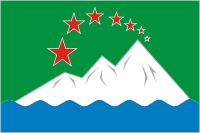
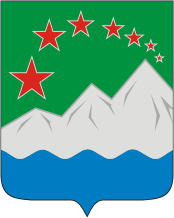
- Flag Coat of arms
- Location of Ashinsky District in Chelyabinsk Oblast
- Coordinates: 54°59′N 57°17′E
- Country: Russia
- Federal subject: Chelyabinsk Oblast
- Established: 1961
- Administrative center: Asha

Area
  - Total: 2,792 km^{2} (1,078 sq mi)

Population (2010 Census)
  - Total: 32,898
  - Density: 11.78/km^{2} (30.52/sq mi)
  - Urban: 90.2%
  - Rural: 9.8%

Administrative structure
  - Administrative divisions: 3 Towns, 1 Work settlements, 5 Selsoviets
  - Inhabited localities: 3 cities/towns, 1 urban-type settlements, 21 rural localities

Municipal structure
  - Municipally incorporated as: Ashinsky Municipal District
  - Municipal divisions: 4 urban settlements, 5 rural settlements
- Time zone: UTC+5 (MSK+2)
- OKTMO ID: 75609000
- Website: http://аша-район.рф

Population of Ashinsky District
- 2010 Census: 32,898
- 2002 Census: 37,045
- 1989 Census: 43,876
- 1979 Census: 48,040

Ashinsky District (Russian: Аши́нский райо́н) is an administrative and municipal district (raion), one of the twenty-seven in Chelyabinsk Oblast, Russia. It is located in the west of the oblast. The area of the district is 2,792 square kilometers (1,078 sq mi). Its administrative center is the town of Asha. As of the 2010 Census, the total population of the district (excluding the administrative center) was 32,898.

== History ==
The district was established in 1961.

== Administrative and municipal status ==
Within the framework of administrative divisions, it has a status of a town with territorial district—a unit equal in status to administrative districts—the full name of which is The Town of Asha and Ashinsky District (город Аша и Ашинский район). As a municipal division, it is incorporated as Ashinsky Municipal District.
