= Ilmensky Mountains =

Uralic mountains

The Ilmensky Mountains
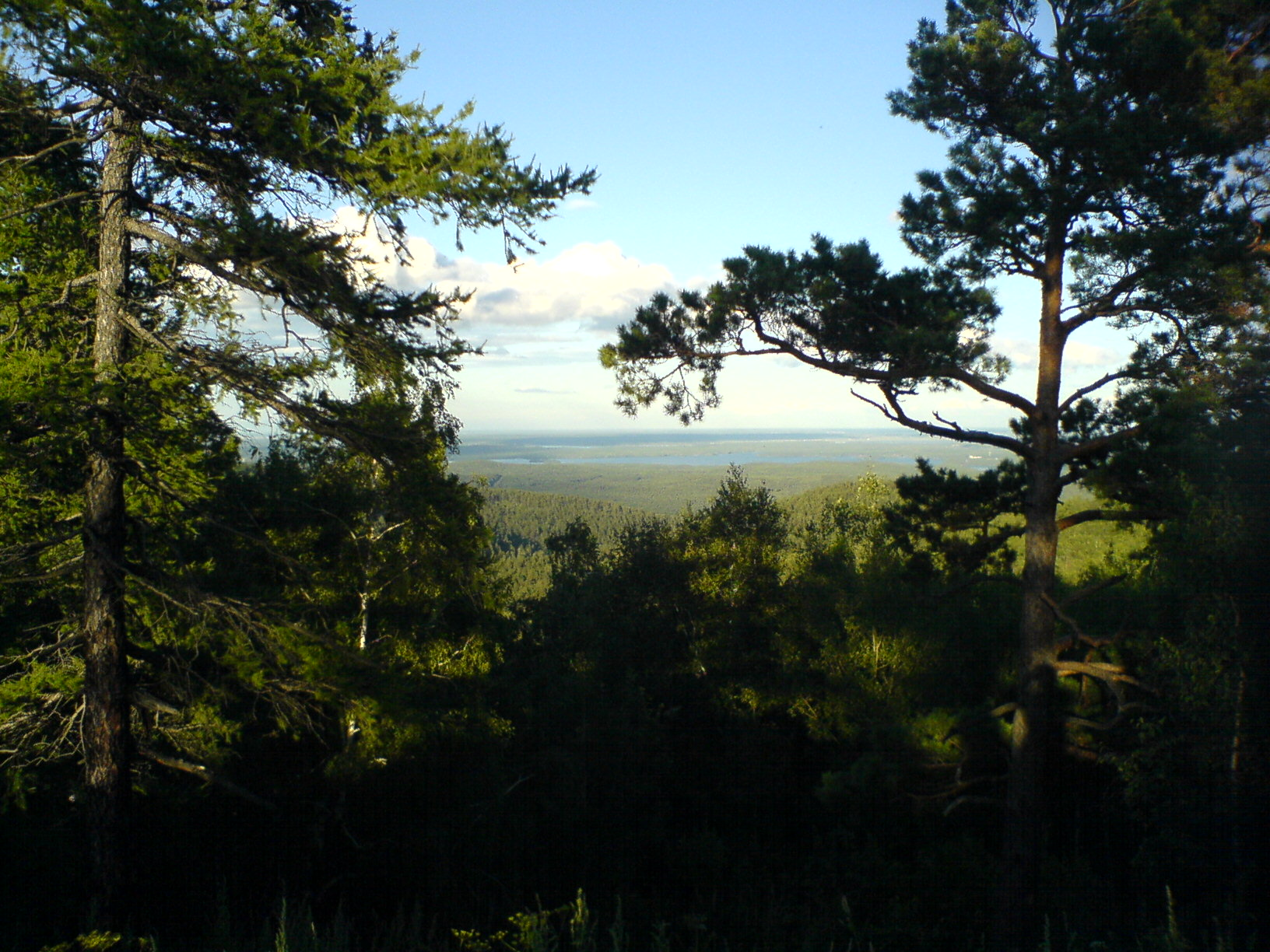

Highest point
- Peak: Mount Ilmentau
- Elevation: 754 m (2,474 ft)
- Coordinates: 54°58′N 60°07′E

Dimensions
- Length: 28 km (17 mi)
- Width: 15 km (9.3 mi)

Geography
- Location within Russia
- Country: Russia
- Oblasts: Chelyabinsk and Sverdlovsk

Geology
- Rock age: Carboniferous

The Ilmensky Mountains (Russian: Ильменские горы, romanized: Il'menskiye gory) are located in the Southern Urals in the Chelyabinsk Oblast on the administrative territory of Miass in Chebarkulsky and Argayashsky districts. They are on the Tentative list of UNESCO World Heritage Sites.

They are known for their precious (like topaz and beryl) and semi-precious stones, such as amazonite and rare metals, found in pegmatites and nepheline syenites. Ilmenite is named after them, after being found here. Now, most part of Ilmensky Mountains are inside strict Ilmen Nature Reserve and all mining activities there are prohibited.
