= List of minor planets: 37001–38000 =

The following is a partial list of minor planets, running from minor-planet number 37001 through 38000, inclusive. The primary data for this and other partial lists is based on JPL's "Small-Body Orbital Elements" and data available from the Minor Planet Center. Critical list information is also provided by the MPC, unless otherwise specified from Lowell Observatory. A detailed description of the table's columns and additional sources are given on the main page including a complete list of every page in this series, and a statistical break-up on the dynamical classification of minor planets.

Also see the summary list of all named bodies in numerical and alphabetical order, and the corresponding naming citations for the number range of this particular list. New namings may only be added to this list after official publication, as the preannouncement of names is condemned by the Working Group for Small Bodies Nomenclature of the International Astronomical Union.

Near-Earth obj.	MBA (inner)	MBA (outer)	Centaur
Mars-crosser	MBA (middle)	Jupiter trojan	Trans-Neptunian obj.
Unclassified

== 37001–37100 ==
Designation			Discovery			Properties		Ref
Permanent	Provisional	Named after	Date	Site	Discoverer(s)	Category	Diam.	Ref
37001	2000 TL_{29}	—	October 3, 2000	Socorro	LINEAR	·	10 km	MPC · JPL
37002	2000 TP_{29}	—	October 3, 2000	Socorro	LINEAR	(194)	5.1 km	MPC · JPL
37003	2000 TF_{35}	—	October 6, 2000	Anderson Mesa	LONEOS	·	3.8 km	MPC · JPL
37004	2000 TN_{36}	—	October 6, 2000	Anderson Mesa	LONEOS	·	3.8 km	MPC · JPL
37005	2000 TO_{37}	—	October 1, 2000	Socorro	LINEAR	VER	7.0 km	MPC · JPL
37006	2000 TS_{37}	—	October 1, 2000	Socorro	LINEAR	·	2.7 km	MPC · JPL
37007	2000 TY_{37}	—	October 1, 2000	Socorro	LINEAR	EOS	6.3 km	MPC · JPL
37008	2000 TB_{38}	—	October 1, 2000	Socorro	LINEAR	·	8.3 km	MPC · JPL
37009	2000 TC_{41}	—	October 1, 2000	Socorro	LINEAR	·	7.1 km	MPC · JPL
37010	2000 TW_{42}	—	October 1, 2000	Socorro	LINEAR	·	2.1 km	MPC · JPL
37011	2000 TZ_{48}	—	October 1, 2000	Socorro	LINEAR	EOS	4.6 km	MPC · JPL
37012	2000 TP_{51}	—	October 1, 2000	Socorro	LINEAR	CYB	5.0 km	MPC · JPL
37013	2000 TA_{54}	—	October 1, 2000	Socorro	LINEAR	·	2.5 km	MPC · JPL
37014	2000 TW_{55}	—	October 1, 2000	Socorro	LINEAR	VER	8.1 km	MPC · JPL
37015	2000 TY_{55}	—	October 1, 2000	Socorro	LINEAR	·	12 km	MPC · JPL
37016	2000 TE_{57}	—	October 2, 2000	Anderson Mesa	LONEOS	·	4.9 km	MPC · JPL
37017	2000 TG_{57}	—	October 2, 2000	Anderson Mesa	LONEOS	·	2.5 km	MPC · JPL
37018	2000 TE_{60}	—	October 2, 2000	Anderson Mesa	LONEOS	·	3.7 km	MPC · JPL
37019 Jordansteckloff	2000 TA_{61}	Jordansteckloff	October 2, 2000	Anderson Mesa	LONEOS	TIR	7.3 km	MPC · JPL
37020	2000 TE_{68}	—	October 6, 2000	Anderson Mesa	LONEOS	·	3.8 km	MPC · JPL
37021	2000 UB_{1}	—	October 21, 2000	Višnjan Observatory	K. Korlević	·	5.0 km	MPC · JPL
37022 Robertovittori	2000 UT_{1}	Robertovittori	October 22, 2000	Sormano	F. Manca, Ventre, G.	·	6.4 km	MPC · JPL
37023	2000 UD_{2}	—	October 22, 2000	Višnjan Observatory	K. Korlević	EOS	3.9 km	MPC · JPL
37024	2000 UM_{5}	—	October 24, 2000	Socorro	LINEAR	DOR	9.2 km	MPC · JPL
37025	2000 US_{5}	—	October 24, 2000	Socorro	LINEAR	·	4.4 km	MPC · JPL
37026	2000 UF_{6}	—	October 24, 2000	Socorro	LINEAR	THM	8.0 km	MPC · JPL
37027	2000 UO_{6}	—	October 24, 2000	Socorro	LINEAR	THM	5.2 km	MPC · JPL
37028	2000 UR_{6}	—	October 24, 2000	Socorro	LINEAR	THM	6.0 km	MPC · JPL
37029	2000 UZ_{6}	—	October 24, 2000	Socorro	LINEAR	KOR	4.2 km	MPC · JPL
37030	2000 UB_{7}	—	October 24, 2000	Socorro	LINEAR	·	5.8 km	MPC · JPL
37031	2000 UD_{8}	—	October 24, 2000	Socorro	LINEAR	(5)	3.4 km	MPC · JPL
37032	2000 UL_{8}	—	October 24, 2000	Socorro	LINEAR	·	7.5 km	MPC · JPL
37033	2000 UX_{8}	—	October 24, 2000	Socorro	LINEAR	·	6.9 km	MPC · JPL
37034	2000 UC_{9}	—	October 24, 2000	Socorro	LINEAR	slow	7.7 km	MPC · JPL
37035	2000 UQ_{10}	—	October 24, 2000	Socorro	LINEAR	THM	7.9 km	MPC · JPL
37036	2000 UA_{20}	—	October 24, 2000	Socorro	LINEAR	·	10 km	MPC · JPL
37037	2000 UK_{21}	—	October 24, 2000	Socorro	LINEAR	KOR	3.2 km	MPC · JPL
37038	2000 UN_{21}	—	October 24, 2000	Socorro	LINEAR	AGN	2.8 km	MPC · JPL
37039	2000 UX_{21}	—	October 24, 2000	Socorro	LINEAR	·	5.1 km	MPC · JPL
37040	2000 UP_{22}	—	October 24, 2000	Socorro	LINEAR	·	2.2 km	MPC · JPL
37041	2000 UZ_{22}	—	October 24, 2000	Socorro	LINEAR	·	2.8 km	MPC · JPL
37042	2000 UN_{25}	—	October 24, 2000	Socorro	LINEAR	·	4.0 km	MPC · JPL
37043	2000 US_{26}	—	October 24, 2000	Socorro	LINEAR	(5)	3.3 km	MPC · JPL
37044 Papymarcel	2000 UE_{29}	Papymarcel	October 27, 2000	Le Creusot	J.-C. Merlin	·	7.4 km	MPC · JPL
37045	2000 UG_{34}	—	October 24, 2000	Socorro	LINEAR	KOR	3.0 km	MPC · JPL
37046	2000 UP_{35}	—	October 24, 2000	Socorro	LINEAR	AGN	2.9 km	MPC · JPL
37047	2000 UU_{35}	—	October 24, 2000	Socorro	LINEAR	EOS	5.4 km	MPC · JPL
37048	2000 UZ_{36}	—	October 24, 2000	Socorro	LINEAR	KOR	3.2 km	MPC · JPL
37049	2000 UC_{38}	—	October 24, 2000	Socorro	LINEAR	·	5.9 km	MPC · JPL
37050	2000 UW_{38}	—	October 24, 2000	Socorro	LINEAR	THM	7.3 km	MPC · JPL
37051	2000 UH_{39}	—	October 24, 2000	Socorro	LINEAR	·	8.2 km	MPC · JPL
37052	2000 UO_{39}	—	October 24, 2000	Socorro	LINEAR	THM · fast ·	6.6 km	MPC · JPL
37053	2000 UQ_{39}	—	October 24, 2000	Socorro	LINEAR	·	6.1 km	MPC · JPL
37054	2000 UD_{40}	—	October 24, 2000	Socorro	LINEAR	·	6.7 km	MPC · JPL
37055	2000 UT_{40}	—	October 24, 2000	Socorro	LINEAR	AGN	3.5 km	MPC · JPL
37056	2000 UD_{42}	—	October 24, 2000	Socorro	LINEAR	·	4.4 km	MPC · JPL
37057	2000 UN_{42}	—	October 24, 2000	Socorro	LINEAR	NYS	3.5 km	MPC · JPL
37058	2000 US_{42}	—	October 24, 2000	Socorro	LINEAR	PAD	5.3 km	MPC · JPL
37059	2000 UO_{43}	—	October 24, 2000	Socorro	LINEAR	·	3.8 km	MPC · JPL
37060	2000 UK_{45}	—	October 24, 2000	Socorro	LINEAR	THM	7.6 km	MPC · JPL
37061	2000 UL_{45}	—	October 24, 2000	Socorro	LINEAR	KOR	3.4 km	MPC · JPL
37062	2000 UR_{45}	—	October 24, 2000	Socorro	LINEAR	·	2.4 km	MPC · JPL
37063	2000 UX_{45}	—	October 24, 2000	Socorro	LINEAR	·	4.6 km	MPC · JPL
37064	2000 UO_{48}	—	October 24, 2000	Socorro	LINEAR	THM	7.4 km	MPC · JPL
37065	2000 UT_{48}	—	October 24, 2000	Socorro	LINEAR	THM	8.8 km	MPC · JPL
37066	2000 UJ_{49}	—	October 24, 2000	Socorro	LINEAR	·	5.3 km	MPC · JPL
37067	2000 UW_{49}	—	October 24, 2000	Socorro	LINEAR	NYS	2.8 km	MPC · JPL
37068	2000 UZ_{49}	—	October 24, 2000	Socorro	LINEAR	KOR	3.5 km	MPC · JPL
37069	2000 UC_{50}	—	October 24, 2000	Socorro	LINEAR	KOR	3.7 km	MPC · JPL
37070	2000 UT_{51}	—	October 24, 2000	Socorro	LINEAR	KOR	3.3 km	MPC · JPL
37071	2000 UY_{51}	—	October 24, 2000	Socorro	LINEAR	·	4.1 km	MPC · JPL
37072	2000 UF_{52}	—	October 24, 2000	Socorro	LINEAR	(5)	3.3 km	MPC · JPL
37073	2000 UH_{53}	—	October 24, 2000	Socorro	LINEAR	KOR	3.4 km	MPC · JPL
37074	2000 UV_{53}	—	October 24, 2000	Socorro	LINEAR	PAD	7.6 km	MPC · JPL
37075	2000 UC_{54}	—	October 24, 2000	Socorro	LINEAR	URS	11 km	MPC · JPL
37076	2000 UK_{54}	—	October 24, 2000	Socorro	LINEAR	EOS	7.6 km	MPC · JPL
37077	2000 UK_{55}	—	October 24, 2000	Socorro	LINEAR	·	3.3 km	MPC · JPL
37078	2000 UZ_{57}	—	October 25, 2000	Socorro	LINEAR	·	7.6 km	MPC · JPL
37079	2000 UM_{58}	—	October 25, 2000	Socorro	LINEAR	(2076)	3.6 km	MPC · JPL
37080	2000 US_{58}	—	October 25, 2000	Socorro	LINEAR	·	3.3 km	MPC · JPL
37081	2000 UW_{59}	—	October 25, 2000	Socorro	LINEAR	EUN	5.0 km	MPC · JPL
37082	2000 UH_{60}	—	October 25, 2000	Socorro	LINEAR	AGN	3.2 km	MPC · JPL
37083	2000 UK_{60}	—	October 25, 2000	Socorro	LINEAR	·	3.3 km	MPC · JPL
37084	2000 UD_{61}	—	October 25, 2000	Socorro	LINEAR	·	5.8 km	MPC · JPL
37085	2000 UO_{63}	—	October 25, 2000	Socorro	LINEAR	·	3.3 km	MPC · JPL
37086	2000 UU_{63}	—	October 25, 2000	Socorro	LINEAR	V	2.4 km	MPC · JPL
37087	2000 UN_{67}	—	October 25, 2000	Socorro	LINEAR	·	8.3 km	MPC · JPL
37088	2000 UE_{70}	—	October 25, 2000	Socorro	LINEAR	V	2.2 km	MPC · JPL
37089	2000 UQ_{71}	—	October 25, 2000	Socorro	LINEAR	·	3.7 km	MPC · JPL
37090	2000 UB_{72}	—	October 25, 2000	Socorro	LINEAR	·	4.6 km	MPC · JPL
37091	2000 UK_{72}	—	October 25, 2000	Socorro	LINEAR	EOS	5.1 km	MPC · JPL
37092	2000 UG_{78}	—	October 24, 2000	Socorro	LINEAR	·	7.0 km	MPC · JPL
37093	2000 UE_{86}	—	October 31, 2000	Socorro	LINEAR	·	5.2 km	MPC · JPL
37094	2000 UD_{87}	—	October 31, 2000	Socorro	LINEAR	·	2.7 km	MPC · JPL
37095	2000 UR_{89}	—	October 31, 2000	Socorro	LINEAR	·	5.4 km	MPC · JPL
37096	2000 UY_{89}	—	October 31, 2000	Socorro	LINEAR	·	6.5 km	MPC · JPL
37097	2000 UM_{90}	—	October 24, 2000	Socorro	LINEAR	EOS	10 km	MPC · JPL
37098	2000 UL_{94}	—	October 25, 2000	Socorro	LINEAR	·	5.3 km	MPC · JPL
37099	2000 UM_{94}	—	October 25, 2000	Socorro	LINEAR	·	5.4 km	MPC · JPL
37100	2000 UH_{96}	—	October 25, 2000	Socorro	LINEAR	·	2.4 km	MPC · JPL

== 37101–37200 ==
back to top

Designation			Discovery			Properties		Ref
Permanent	Provisional	Named after	Date	Site	Discoverer(s)	Category	Diam.	Ref
37101	2000 UO_{96}	—	October 25, 2000	Socorro	LINEAR	·	2.0 km	MPC · JPL
37102	2000 UW_{98}	—	October 25, 2000	Socorro	LINEAR	·	2.5 km	MPC · JPL
37103	2000 UJ_{99}	—	October 25, 2000	Socorro	LINEAR	·	4.5 km	MPC · JPL
37104	2000 UP_{99}	—	October 25, 2000	Socorro	LINEAR	(2076)	3.6 km	MPC · JPL
37105	2000 UA_{101}	—	October 25, 2000	Socorro	LINEAR	EOS	6.8 km	MPC · JPL
37106	2000 UC_{101}	—	October 25, 2000	Socorro	LINEAR	slow	3.4 km	MPC · JPL
37107	2000 UK_{101}	—	October 25, 2000	Socorro	LINEAR	·	2.6 km	MPC · JPL
37108	2000 UG_{102}	—	October 25, 2000	Socorro	LINEAR	·	2.0 km	MPC · JPL
37109	2000 UZ_{102}	—	October 25, 2000	Socorro	LINEAR	(1298)	10 km	MPC · JPL
37110	2000 UF_{103}	—	October 25, 2000	Socorro	LINEAR	·	6.4 km	MPC · JPL
37111	2000 UP_{103}	—	October 25, 2000	Socorro	LINEAR	·	8.7 km	MPC · JPL
37112	2000 UG_{104}	—	October 25, 2000	Socorro	LINEAR	·	3.5 km	MPC · JPL
37113	2000 UK_{104}	—	October 25, 2000	Socorro	LINEAR	V	3.5 km	MPC · JPL
37114	2000 UO_{104}	—	October 25, 2000	Socorro	LINEAR	·	5.7 km	MPC · JPL
37115	2000 UE_{105}	—	October 29, 2000	Socorro	LINEAR	·	6.3 km	MPC · JPL
37116	2000 UG_{110}	—	October 29, 2000	Socorro	LINEAR	·	5.7 km	MPC · JPL
37117 Narcissus	2000 VU_{2}	Narcissus	November 1, 2000	Desert Beaver	W. K. Y. Yeung	T_{j} (2.62) · unusual	11 km	MPC · JPL
37118	2000 VW_{4}	—	November 1, 2000	Socorro	LINEAR	MAS	2.3 km	MPC · JPL
37119	2000 VQ_{6}	—	November 1, 2000	Socorro	LINEAR	·	3.0 km	MPC · JPL
37120	2000 VS_{6}	—	November 1, 2000	Socorro	LINEAR	·	3.5 km	MPC · JPL
37121	2000 VU_{7}	—	November 1, 2000	Socorro	LINEAR	·	3.2 km	MPC · JPL
37122	2000 VQ_{10}	—	November 1, 2000	Socorro	LINEAR	·	3.3 km	MPC · JPL
37123	2000 VW_{10}	—	November 1, 2000	Socorro	LINEAR	fast	6.1 km	MPC · JPL
37124	2000 VH_{11}	—	November 1, 2000	Socorro	LINEAR	THM	6.7 km	MPC · JPL
37125	2000 VP_{12}	—	November 1, 2000	Socorro	LINEAR	HOF	5.7 km	MPC · JPL
37126	2000 VX_{15}	—	November 1, 2000	Socorro	LINEAR	·	4.6 km	MPC · JPL
37127	2000 VU_{17}	—	November 1, 2000	Socorro	LINEAR	THM	8.2 km	MPC · JPL
37128	2000 VD_{22}	—	November 1, 2000	Socorro	LINEAR	MAS	2.3 km	MPC · JPL
37129	2000 VZ_{22}	—	November 1, 2000	Socorro	LINEAR	KOR	3.5 km	MPC · JPL
37130	2000 VS_{26}	—	November 1, 2000	Socorro	LINEAR	·	3.3 km	MPC · JPL
37131	2000 VW_{29}	—	November 1, 2000	Socorro	LINEAR	·	3.4 km	MPC · JPL
37132	2000 VB_{30}	—	November 1, 2000	Socorro	LINEAR	GEF	5.1 km	MPC · JPL
37133	2000 VD_{30}	—	November 1, 2000	Socorro	LINEAR	·	2.2 km	MPC · JPL
37134	2000 VA_{32}	—	November 1, 2000	Socorro	LINEAR	EOS	5.8 km	MPC · JPL
37135	2000 VO_{32}	—	November 1, 2000	Socorro	LINEAR	HYG	7.7 km	MPC · JPL
37136	2000 VA_{33}	—	November 1, 2000	Socorro	LINEAR	·	2.9 km	MPC · JPL
37137	2000 VK_{33}	—	November 1, 2000	Socorro	LINEAR	NYS	3.3 km	MPC · JPL
37138	2000 VT_{33}	—	November 1, 2000	Socorro	LINEAR	KOR	4.1 km	MPC · JPL
37139 Richardmuller	2000 VH_{38}	Richardmuller	November 1, 2000	Desert Beaver	W. K. Y. Yeung	·	4.4 km	MPC · JPL
37140	2000 VQ_{38}	—	November 1, 2000	Kitt Peak	Spacewatch	AGN	2.4 km	MPC · JPL
37141 Povolný	2000 VZ_{38}	Povolný	November 2, 2000	Ondřejov	P. Pravec	·	2.6 km	MPC · JPL
37142	2000 VK_{41}	—	November 1, 2000	Socorro	LINEAR	·	2.1 km	MPC · JPL
37143	2000 VG_{44}	—	November 2, 2000	Socorro	LINEAR	·	3.5 km	MPC · JPL
37144	2000 VL_{44}	—	November 2, 2000	Socorro	LINEAR	KOR	3.6 km	MPC · JPL
37145	2000 VZ_{45}	—	November 2, 2000	Socorro	LINEAR	·	3.1 km	MPC · JPL
37146	2000 VD_{46}	—	November 3, 2000	Socorro	LINEAR	·	2.1 km	MPC · JPL
37147	2000 VF_{48}	—	November 2, 2000	Socorro	LINEAR	·	8.6 km	MPC · JPL
37148	2000 VF_{49}	—	November 2, 2000	Socorro	LINEAR	·	9.5 km	MPC · JPL
37149	2000 VX_{52}	—	November 3, 2000	Socorro	LINEAR	V	2.5 km	MPC · JPL
37150	2000 VJ_{53}	—	November 3, 2000	Socorro	LINEAR	·	8.8 km	MPC · JPL
37151	2000 VF_{55}	—	November 3, 2000	Socorro	LINEAR	·	7.7 km	MPC · JPL
37152	2000 VV_{56}	—	November 3, 2000	Socorro	LINEAR	·	6.0 km	MPC · JPL
37153	2000 VK_{57}	—	November 3, 2000	Socorro	LINEAR	·	7.8 km	MPC · JPL
37154 Chuckfeeney	2000 VZ_{58}	Chuckfeeney	November 8, 2000	Desert Beaver	W. K. Y. Yeung	PHO	5.5 km	MPC · JPL
37155	2000 VD_{59}	—	November 5, 2000	Socorro	LINEAR	HIL · 3:2	12 km	MPC · JPL
37156	2000 VB_{60}	—	November 1, 2000	Socorro	LINEAR	·	7.7 km	MPC · JPL
37157	2000 VD_{61}	—	November 2, 2000	Socorro	LINEAR	HYG	7.8 km	MPC · JPL
37158	2000 VV_{61}	—	November 9, 2000	Socorro	LINEAR	·	5.9 km	MPC · JPL
37159 Margaretmead	2000 WX	Margaretmead	November 17, 2000	Desert Beaver	W. K. Y. Yeung	·	6.2 km	MPC · JPL
37160	2000 WR_{5}	—	November 19, 2000	Socorro	LINEAR	·	14 km	MPC · JPL
37161	2000 WE_{9}	—	November 20, 2000	Haleakala	NEAT	·	4.1 km	MPC · JPL
37162	2000 WV_{9}	—	November 22, 2000	Farpoint	G. Hug	·	6.0 km	MPC · JPL
37163 Huachucaclub	2000 WD_{11}	Huachucaclub	November 19, 2000	Junk Bond	J. Medkeff, D. Healy	·	3.6 km	MPC · JPL
37164	2000 WT_{12}	—	November 22, 2000	Haleakala	NEAT	EOS	6.0 km	MPC · JPL
37165	2000 WS_{13}	—	November 20, 2000	Socorro	LINEAR	MAR	4.2 km	MPC · JPL
37166	2000 WB_{22}	—	November 20, 2000	Socorro	LINEAR	·	9.8 km	MPC · JPL
37167	2000 WE_{22}	—	November 20, 2000	Socorro	LINEAR	EOS	5.1 km	MPC · JPL
37168	2000 WL_{22}	—	November 20, 2000	Socorro	LINEAR	·	4.6 km	MPC · JPL
37169	2000 WX_{22}	—	November 20, 2000	Socorro	LINEAR	GEF	3.7 km	MPC · JPL
37170	2000 WY_{26}	—	November 25, 2000	Socorro	LINEAR	CYB	11 km	MPC · JPL
37171	2000 WO_{28}	—	November 23, 2000	Haleakala	NEAT	·	3.6 km	MPC · JPL
37172	2000 WQ_{32}	—	November 20, 2000	Socorro	LINEAR	EOS	6.0 km	MPC · JPL
37173	2000 WW_{33}	—	November 20, 2000	Socorro	LINEAR	·	4.9 km	MPC · JPL
37174	2000 WE_{37}	—	November 20, 2000	Socorro	LINEAR	·	3.2 km	MPC · JPL
37175	2000 WJ_{40}	—	November 20, 2000	Socorro	LINEAR	·	6.4 km	MPC · JPL
37176	2000 WB_{42}	—	November 21, 2000	Socorro	LINEAR	·	3.7 km	MPC · JPL
37177	2000 WC_{43}	—	November 21, 2000	Socorro	LINEAR	·	3.3 km	MPC · JPL
37178	2000 WD_{45}	—	November 21, 2000	Socorro	LINEAR	·	6.4 km	MPC · JPL
37179	2000 WW_{45}	—	November 21, 2000	Socorro	LINEAR	·	3.3 km	MPC · JPL
37180	2000 WE_{46}	—	November 21, 2000	Socorro	LINEAR	EOS	5.7 km	MPC · JPL
37181	2000 WS_{49}	—	November 25, 2000	Socorro	LINEAR	·	3.7 km	MPC · JPL
37182	2000 WW_{49}	—	November 25, 2000	Socorro	LINEAR	TIR	5.0 km	MPC · JPL
37183	2000 WH_{50}	—	November 26, 2000	Socorro	LINEAR	·	4.5 km	MPC · JPL
37184	2000 WC_{53}	—	November 27, 2000	Kitt Peak	Spacewatch	KOR	3.9 km	MPC · JPL
37185	2000 WJ_{58}	—	November 21, 2000	Socorro	LINEAR	·	13 km	MPC · JPL
37186	2000 WC_{60}	—	November 21, 2000	Socorro	LINEAR	·	12 km	MPC · JPL
37187	2000 WP_{60}	—	November 21, 2000	Socorro	LINEAR	·	13 km	MPC · JPL
37188	2000 WE_{61}	—	November 21, 2000	Socorro	LINEAR	·	4.2 km	MPC · JPL
37189	2000 WJ_{62}	—	November 23, 2000	Haleakala	NEAT	·	5.7 km	MPC · JPL
37190	2000 WC_{63}	—	November 28, 2000	Fountain Hills	C. W. Juels	PHO	3.3 km	MPC · JPL
37191	2000 WP_{69}	—	November 19, 2000	Socorro	LINEAR	·	3.4 km	MPC · JPL
37192	2000 WL_{70}	—	November 19, 2000	Socorro	LINEAR	·	2.4 km	MPC · JPL
37193	2000 WF_{73}	—	November 20, 2000	Socorro	LINEAR	·	4.3 km	MPC · JPL
37194	2000 WG_{73}	—	November 20, 2000	Socorro	LINEAR	·	3.2 km	MPC · JPL
37195	2000 WD_{75}	—	November 20, 2000	Socorro	LINEAR	·	6.5 km	MPC · JPL
37196	2000 WR_{76}	—	November 20, 2000	Socorro	LINEAR	·	4.9 km	MPC · JPL
37197	2000 WR_{77}	—	November 20, 2000	Socorro	LINEAR	·	3.0 km	MPC · JPL
37198	2000 WH_{79}	—	November 20, 2000	Socorro	LINEAR	EOS	4.9 km	MPC · JPL
37199	2000 WV_{92}	—	November 21, 2000	Socorro	LINEAR	CYB	9.6 km	MPC · JPL
37200	2000 WC_{93}	—	November 21, 2000	Socorro	LINEAR	·	6.5 km	MPC · JPL

== 37201–37300 ==
back to top

Designation			Discovery			Properties		Ref
Permanent	Provisional	Named after	Date	Site	Discoverer(s)	Category	Diam.	Ref
37201	2000 WS_{94}	—	November 21, 2000	Socorro	LINEAR	KOR	4.5 km	MPC · JPL
37202	2000 WK_{95}	—	November 21, 2000	Socorro	LINEAR	(5)	4.3 km	MPC · JPL
37203	2000 WS_{98}	—	November 21, 2000	Socorro	LINEAR	EOS	10 km	MPC · JPL
37204	2000 WE_{100}	—	November 21, 2000	Socorro	LINEAR	EOS	7.4 km	MPC · JPL
37205	2000 WD_{102}	—	November 26, 2000	Socorro	LINEAR	EOS	3.6 km	MPC · JPL
37206	2000 WQ_{102}	—	November 26, 2000	Socorro	LINEAR	EUN	4.4 km	MPC · JPL
37207	2000 WM_{103}	—	November 26, 2000	Socorro	LINEAR	·	5.9 km	MPC · JPL
37208	2000 WK_{104}	—	November 27, 2000	Socorro	LINEAR	·	2.3 km	MPC · JPL
37209	2000 WA_{108}	—	November 20, 2000	Socorro	LINEAR	·	6.3 km	MPC · JPL
37210	2000 WW_{113}	—	November 20, 2000	Socorro	LINEAR	ADE · slow	6.6 km	MPC · JPL
37211	2000 WK_{119}	—	November 20, 2000	Socorro	LINEAR	EOS	6.9 km	MPC · JPL
37212	2000 WO_{126}	—	November 16, 2000	Kitt Peak	Spacewatch	slow	6.3 km	MPC · JPL
37213	2000 WD_{127}	—	November 17, 2000	Kitt Peak	Spacewatch	·	5.4 km	MPC · JPL
37214	2000 WG_{130}	—	November 19, 2000	Kitt Peak	Spacewatch	·	4.2 km	MPC · JPL
37215	2000 WU_{131}	—	November 20, 2000	Anderson Mesa	LONEOS	·	3.6 km	MPC · JPL
37216	2000 WZ_{132}	—	November 19, 2000	Socorro	LINEAR	·	5.5 km	MPC · JPL
37217	2000 WV_{135}	—	November 20, 2000	Anderson Mesa	LONEOS	·	6.7 km	MPC · JPL
37218 Kimyoonyoung	2000 WE_{137}	Kimyoonyoung	November 20, 2000	Anderson Mesa	LONEOS	·	4.7 km	MPC · JPL
37219	2000 WN_{137}	—	November 20, 2000	Anderson Mesa	LONEOS	EUN	4.2 km	MPC · JPL
37220	2000 WX_{138}	—	November 21, 2000	Socorro	LINEAR	·	2.2 km	MPC · JPL
37221	2000 WA_{142}	—	November 20, 2000	Anderson Mesa	LONEOS	·	3.2 km	MPC · JPL
37222 Sansom	2000 WB_{142}	Sansom	November 20, 2000	Anderson Mesa	LONEOS	EUN	3.1 km	MPC · JPL
37223 Devillepoix	2000 WD_{142}	Devillepoix	November 20, 2000	Anderson Mesa	LONEOS	EUN	3.6 km	MPC · JPL
37224	2000 WH_{142}	—	November 20, 2000	Anderson Mesa	LONEOS	·	4.6 km	MPC · JPL
37225	2000 WN_{142}	—	November 20, 2000	Anderson Mesa	LONEOS	MAR	3.6 km	MPC · JPL
37226	2000 WQ_{142}	—	November 20, 2000	Anderson Mesa	LONEOS	MAR ·	4.1 km	MPC · JPL
37227	2000 WW_{142}	—	November 20, 2000	Anderson Mesa	LONEOS	·	11 km	MPC · JPL
37228	2000 WE_{146}	—	November 23, 2000	Haleakala	NEAT	HNS	2.8 km	MPC · JPL
37229	2000 WJ_{146}	—	November 23, 2000	Haleakala	NEAT	·	3.2 km	MPC · JPL
37230	2000 WA_{147}	—	November 28, 2000	Haleakala	NEAT	fast	5.4 km	MPC · JPL
37231	2000 WW_{148}	—	November 29, 2000	Haleakala	NEAT	PHO	2.6 km	MPC · JPL
37232	2000 WS_{154}	—	November 30, 2000	Socorro	LINEAR	·	3.7 km	MPC · JPL
37233	2000 WV_{154}	—	November 30, 2000	Socorro	LINEAR	·	5.3 km	MPC · JPL
37234	2000 WY_{154}	—	November 30, 2000	Socorro	LINEAR	V	2.9 km	MPC · JPL
37235	2000 WP_{155}	—	November 30, 2000	Socorro	LINEAR	·	2.8 km	MPC · JPL
37236	2000 WX_{161}	—	November 20, 2000	Anderson Mesa	LONEOS	EOS	4.5 km	MPC · JPL
37237	2000 WZ_{161}	—	November 20, 2000	Anderson Mesa	LONEOS	2:1J (unstable)	11 km	MPC · JPL
37238	2000 WY_{167}	—	November 24, 2000	Anderson Mesa	LONEOS	·	2.5 km	MPC · JPL
37239	2000 WB_{168}	—	November 25, 2000	Socorro	LINEAR	·	4.0 km	MPC · JPL
37240	2000 WP_{171}	—	November 25, 2000	Socorro	LINEAR	·	3.5 km	MPC · JPL
37241	2000 WS_{171}	—	November 25, 2000	Socorro	LINEAR	·	3.6 km	MPC · JPL
37242	2000 WE_{172}	—	November 25, 2000	Socorro	LINEAR	·	3.8 km	MPC · JPL
37243	2000 WM_{174}	—	November 26, 2000	Socorro	LINEAR	·	5.3 km	MPC · JPL
37244	2000 WF_{175}	—	November 26, 2000	Socorro	LINEAR	·	10 km	MPC · JPL
37245	2000 WL_{179}	—	November 26, 2000	Socorro	LINEAR	·	5.8 km	MPC · JPL
37246	2000 WH_{180}	—	November 27, 2000	Socorro	LINEAR	·	8.4 km	MPC · JPL
37247	2000 WM_{181}	—	November 30, 2000	Anderson Mesa	LONEOS	·	3.3 km	MPC · JPL
37248	2000 WB_{182}	—	November 25, 2000	Socorro	LINEAR	·	3.2 km	MPC · JPL
37249	2000 WZ_{182}	—	November 17, 2000	Socorro	LINEAR	·	6.2 km	MPC · JPL
37250 Juliemitchell	2000 WX_{183}	Juliemitchell	November 30, 2000	Anderson Mesa	LONEOS	·	9.1 km	MPC · JPL
37251	2000 WX_{184}	—	November 29, 2000	Kitt Peak	Spacewatch	·	4.8 km	MPC · JPL
37252	2000 WR_{186}	—	November 27, 2000	Socorro	LINEAR	·	7.6 km	MPC · JPL
37253	2000 WN_{188}	—	November 18, 2000	Anderson Mesa	LONEOS	·	5.2 km	MPC · JPL
37254	2000 WO_{188}	—	November 18, 2000	Anderson Mesa	LONEOS	·	4.2 km	MPC · JPL
37255	2000 WX_{189}	—	November 18, 2000	Anderson Mesa	LONEOS	HYG	5.2 km	MPC · JPL
37256	2000 WX_{191}	—	November 19, 2000	Anderson Mesa	LONEOS	·	5.2 km	MPC · JPL
37257	2000 XM_{2}	—	December 1, 2000	Socorro	LINEAR	·	7.4 km	MPC · JPL
37258	2000 XT_{3}	—	December 1, 2000	Socorro	LINEAR	PHO	3.6 km	MPC · JPL
37259	2000 XF_{4}	—	December 1, 2000	Socorro	LINEAR	·	7.9 km	MPC · JPL
37260	2000 XR_{4}	—	December 1, 2000	Socorro	LINEAR	EOS	7.1 km	MPC · JPL
37261	2000 XC_{5}	—	December 1, 2000	Socorro	LINEAR	GEF	3.4 km	MPC · JPL
37262	2000 XC_{9}	—	December 1, 2000	Socorro	LINEAR	·	4.6 km	MPC · JPL
37263	2000 XP_{12}	—	December 4, 2000	Socorro	LINEAR	EUN	3.6 km	MPC · JPL
37264	2000 XS_{16}	—	December 1, 2000	Socorro	LINEAR	EMA	11 km	MPC · JPL
37265	2000 XT_{17}	—	December 4, 2000	Socorro	LINEAR	EUN	6.7 km	MPC · JPL
37266	2000 XG_{18}	—	December 4, 2000	Socorro	LINEAR	·	5.9 km	MPC · JPL
37267	2000 XJ_{23}	—	December 4, 2000	Socorro	LINEAR	EUN	3.4 km	MPC · JPL
37268	2000 XB_{24}	—	December 4, 2000	Socorro	LINEAR	·	4.9 km	MPC · JPL
37269	2000 XO_{24}	—	December 4, 2000	Socorro	LINEAR	·	4.3 km	MPC · JPL
37270	2000 XP_{32}	—	December 4, 2000	Socorro	LINEAR	·	9.3 km	MPC · JPL
37271	2000 XR_{34}	—	December 4, 2000	Socorro	LINEAR	EUN	3.8 km	MPC · JPL
37272	2000 XR_{39}	—	December 4, 2000	Socorro	LINEAR	(3025)	12 km	MPC · JPL
37273	2000 XP_{40}	—	December 5, 2000	Socorro	LINEAR	MAR	3.3 km	MPC · JPL
37274	2000 XO_{42}	—	December 5, 2000	Socorro	LINEAR	·	5.6 km	MPC · JPL
37275	2000 XF_{43}	—	December 5, 2000	Socorro	LINEAR	·	6.3 km	MPC · JPL
37276	2000 XL_{43}	—	December 5, 2000	Socorro	LINEAR	EUN · slow	3.8 km	MPC · JPL
37277	2000 YJ	—	December 16, 2000	Socorro	LINEAR	PHO	3.1 km	MPC · JPL
37278	2000 YE_{7}	—	December 20, 2000	Socorro	LINEAR	·	5.4 km	MPC · JPL
37279 Hukvaldy	2000 YK_{12}	Hukvaldy	December 22, 2000	Ondřejov	P. Pravec, P. Kušnirák	·	4.9 km	MPC · JPL
37280	2000 YT_{19}	—	December 28, 2000	Fair Oaks Ranch	J. V. McClusky	·	9.7 km	MPC · JPL
37281	2000 YA_{61}	—	December 30, 2000	Socorro	LINEAR	L4	16 km	MPC · JPL
37282	2000 YJ_{67}	—	December 28, 2000	Socorro	LINEAR	·	9.2 km	MPC · JPL
37283	2000 YA_{71}	—	December 30, 2000	Socorro	LINEAR	EOS	7.5 km	MPC · JPL
37284	2000 YG_{76}	—	December 30, 2000	Socorro	LINEAR	EOS	6.3 km	MPC · JPL
37285	2000 YJ_{78}	—	December 30, 2000	Socorro	LINEAR	·	2.8 km	MPC · JPL
37286	2000 YL_{101}	—	December 28, 2000	Socorro	LINEAR	·	19 km	MPC · JPL
37287	2000 YM_{101}	—	December 28, 2000	Socorro	LINEAR	·	6.2 km	MPC · JPL
37288	2000 YU_{121}	—	December 22, 2000	Haleakala	NEAT	·	6.2 km	MPC · JPL
37289	2000 YK_{124}	—	December 29, 2000	Anderson Mesa	LONEOS	KOR	3.6 km	MPC · JPL
37290	2000 YX_{135}	—	December 22, 2000	Haleakala	NEAT	·	11 km	MPC · JPL
37291	2001 AP_{26}	—	January 5, 2001	Socorro	LINEAR	CYB	11 km	MPC · JPL
37292	2001 AN_{34}	—	January 4, 2001	Socorro	LINEAR	·	5.6 km	MPC · JPL
37293	2001 AF_{43}	—	January 4, 2001	Anderson Mesa	LONEOS	·	6.1 km	MPC · JPL
37294	2001 BT_{44}	—	January 19, 2001	Socorro	LINEAR	·	3.2 km	MPC · JPL
37295	2001 BB_{46}	—	January 21, 2001	Socorro	LINEAR	fast	4.3 km	MPC · JPL
37296	2001 BX_{54}	—	January 19, 2001	Socorro	LINEAR	EUN	3.4 km	MPC · JPL
37297	2001 BQ_{77}	—	January 26, 2001	Haleakala	NEAT	L4	27 km	MPC · JPL
37298	2001 BU_{80}	—	January 19, 2001	Socorro	LINEAR	L4	22 km	MPC · JPL
37299	2001 CN_{21}	—	February 1, 2001	Anderson Mesa	LONEOS	L4	25 km	MPC · JPL
37300	2001 CW_{32}	—	February 13, 2001	Socorro	LINEAR	L4	20 km	MPC · JPL

== 37301–37400 ==
back to top

Designation			Discovery			Properties		Ref
Permanent	Provisional	Named after	Date	Site	Discoverer(s)	Category	Diam.	Ref
37301	2001 CA_{39}	—	February 13, 2001	Socorro	LINEAR	L4	27 km	MPC · JPL
37302	2001 EG_{11}	—	March 2, 2001	Haleakala	NEAT	(5)	3.8 km	MPC · JPL
37303	2001 EF_{23}	—	March 15, 2001	Kitt Peak	Spacewatch	·	3.6 km	MPC · JPL
37304	2001 EW_{23}	—	March 15, 2001	Haleakala	NEAT	·	6.4 km	MPC · JPL
37305	2001 HF_{55}	—	April 24, 2001	Socorro	LINEAR	V	1.9 km	MPC · JPL
37306	2001 KW_{46}	—	May 22, 2001	Socorro	LINEAR	·	7.0 km	MPC · JPL
37307	2001 LG_{16}	—	June 13, 2001	Haleakala	NEAT	·	1.7 km	MPC · JPL
37308	2001 OP_{16}	—	July 21, 2001	Palomar	NEAT	·	1.8 km	MPC · JPL
37309 Pajuelo	2001 OX_{62}	Pajuelo	July 20, 2001	Anderson Mesa	LONEOS	MAR	4.6 km	MPC · JPL
37310	2001 OE_{107}	—	July 29, 2001	Socorro	LINEAR	·	2.8 km	MPC · JPL
37311	2001 PH_{28}	—	August 14, 2001	Haleakala	NEAT	·	7.2 km	MPC · JPL
37312	2001 PJ_{62}	—	August 13, 2001	Palomar	NEAT	EOS	5.3 km	MPC · JPL
37313 Paolocampaner	2001 QC	Paolocampaner	August 16, 2001	San Marcello	M. Tombelli, A. Boattini	·	5.5 km	MPC · JPL
37314	2001 QP	—	August 16, 2001	Socorro	LINEAR	·	3.8 km	MPC · JPL
37315	2001 QQ_{16}	—	August 16, 2001	Socorro	LINEAR	·	1.8 km	MPC · JPL
37316	2001 QS_{28}	—	August 16, 2001	Socorro	LINEAR	DOR	8.6 km	MPC · JPL
37317	2001 QT_{31}	—	August 16, 2001	Socorro	LINEAR	EUN · slow	4.3 km	MPC · JPL
37318	2001 QZ_{31}	—	August 16, 2001	Socorro	LINEAR	·	4.6 km	MPC · JPL
37319	2001 QL_{37}	—	August 16, 2001	Socorro	LINEAR	DOR	9.4 km	MPC · JPL
37320	2001 QF_{51}	—	August 16, 2001	Socorro	LINEAR	·	1.9 km	MPC · JPL
37321	2001 QX_{69}	—	August 17, 2001	Socorro	LINEAR	EUN	4.8 km	MPC · JPL
37322	2001 QM_{76}	—	August 16, 2001	Socorro	LINEAR	·	5.0 km	MPC · JPL
37323	2001 QY_{76}	—	August 16, 2001	Socorro	LINEAR	(5)	4.2 km	MPC · JPL
37324	2001 QN_{77}	—	August 16, 2001	Socorro	LINEAR	·	3.1 km	MPC · JPL
37325	2001 QG_{78}	—	August 16, 2001	Socorro	LINEAR	·	6.0 km	MPC · JPL
37326	2001 QA_{79}	—	August 16, 2001	Socorro	LINEAR	slow	11 km	MPC · JPL
37327	2001 QG_{79}	—	August 16, 2001	Socorro	LINEAR	·	2.5 km	MPC · JPL
37328	2001 QN_{99}	—	August 22, 2001	Socorro	LINEAR	EUN	7.4 km	MPC · JPL
37329	2001 QW_{108}	—	August 23, 2001	Palomar	NEAT	·	2.0 km	MPC · JPL
37330	2001 QN_{136}	—	August 22, 2001	Socorro	LINEAR	EOS	6.9 km	MPC · JPL
37331	2001 QY_{138}	—	August 22, 2001	Socorro	LINEAR	·	6.2 km	MPC · JPL
37332	2001 QJ_{140}	—	August 22, 2001	Socorro	LINEAR	EUN	4.6 km	MPC · JPL
37333	2001 QU_{178}	—	August 27, 2001	Palomar	NEAT	·	3.2 km	MPC · JPL
37334	2001 QW_{197}	—	August 22, 2001	Socorro	LINEAR	(1298)	5.0 km	MPC · JPL
37335	2001 QX_{268}	—	August 20, 2001	Socorro	LINEAR	·	2.5 km	MPC · JPL
37336	2001 RM	—	September 6, 2001	Socorro	LINEAR	AMO +1km	2.5 km	MPC · JPL
37337	2001 RH_{72}	—	September 10, 2001	Socorro	LINEAR	URS	11 km	MPC · JPL
37338	2001 RF_{93}	—	September 11, 2001	Anderson Mesa	LONEOS	CYB	10 km	MPC · JPL
37339	2001 RQ_{94}	—	September 11, 2001	Anderson Mesa	LONEOS	·	3.8 km	MPC · JPL
37340	2001 RY_{120}	—	September 12, 2001	Socorro	LINEAR	·	3.1 km	MPC · JPL
37341	2001 SO_{16}	—	September 16, 2001	Socorro	LINEAR	·	1.8 km	MPC · JPL
37342	2001 SA_{22}	—	September 16, 2001	Socorro	LINEAR	RAF	3.5 km	MPC · JPL
37343	2001 SG_{27}	—	September 16, 2001	Socorro	LINEAR	·	2.2 km	MPC · JPL
37344	2001 SS_{54}	—	September 16, 2001	Socorro	LINEAR	·	10 km	MPC · JPL
37345	2001 SV_{153}	—	September 17, 2001	Socorro	LINEAR	·	10 km	MPC · JPL
37346	2001 SU_{154}	—	September 17, 2001	Socorro	LINEAR	KOR	3.6 km	MPC · JPL
37347	2001 SB_{287}	—	September 22, 2001	Palomar	NEAT	·	4.1 km	MPC · JPL
37348	2001 SH_{289}	—	September 27, 2001	Palomar	NEAT	·	2.6 km	MPC · JPL
37349 Lynnaequick	2001 SV_{291}	Lynnaequick	September 17, 2001	Anderson Mesa	LONEOS	ADE · slow	7.0 km	MPC · JPL
37350	2001 TU_{19}	—	October 9, 2001	Socorro	LINEAR	·	5.0 km	MPC · JPL
37351	2001 TE_{36}	—	October 14, 2001	Socorro	LINEAR	·	3.9 km	MPC · JPL
37352	2001 TW_{64}	—	October 13, 2001	Socorro	LINEAR	(7744)	4.6 km	MPC · JPL
37353	2001 TG_{66}	—	October 13, 2001	Socorro	LINEAR	·	5.5 km	MPC · JPL
37354	2001 TN_{107}	—	October 13, 2001	Socorro	LINEAR	·	6.5 km	MPC · JPL
37355	2001 TQ_{116}	—	October 14, 2001	Socorro	LINEAR	·	5.2 km	MPC · JPL
37356	2001 TY_{187}	—	October 14, 2001	Socorro	LINEAR	·	8.4 km	MPC · JPL
37357	2001 TD_{196}	—	October 12, 2001	Haleakala	NEAT	·	10 km	MPC · JPL
37358 Filippromanov	2001 UM_{10}	Filippromanov	October 18, 2001	Desert Eagle	W. K. Y. Yeung	NYS	4.3 km	MPC · JPL
37359	2001 UM_{17}	—	October 25, 2001	Desert Eagle	W. K. Y. Yeung	·	2.4 km	MPC · JPL
37360	2001 UZ_{24}	—	October 18, 2001	Socorro	LINEAR	VER	9.4 km	MPC · JPL
37361	2001 UW_{46}	—	October 17, 2001	Socorro	LINEAR	KOR	3.4 km	MPC · JPL
37362	2001 UM_{65}	—	October 18, 2001	Socorro	LINEAR	·	4.0 km	MPC · JPL
37363	2001 UU_{94}	—	October 19, 2001	Haleakala	NEAT	·	3.6 km	MPC · JPL
37364	2001 UW_{118}	—	October 22, 2001	Socorro	LINEAR	·	1.7 km	MPC · JPL
37365	2001 UG_{153}	—	October 23, 2001	Socorro	LINEAR	·	5.1 km	MPC · JPL
37366	2001 UZ_{157}	—	October 23, 2001	Socorro	LINEAR	·	2.4 km	MPC · JPL
37367	2001 VC	—	November 6, 2001	Palomar	NEAT	·	1.8 km	MPC · JPL
37368	2001 VR	—	November 7, 2001	Socorro	LINEAR	·	3.5 km	MPC · JPL
37369	2001 VV	—	November 6, 2001	Socorro	LINEAR	MAR	3.3 km	MPC · JPL
37370	2001 VM_{9}	—	November 9, 2001	Socorro	LINEAR	·	3.6 km	MPC · JPL
37371	2001 VR_{27}	—	November 9, 2001	Socorro	LINEAR	·	7.0 km	MPC · JPL
37372	2001 VF_{33}	—	November 9, 2001	Socorro	LINEAR	·	5.1 km	MPC · JPL
37373	2001 VM_{34}	—	November 9, 2001	Socorro	LINEAR	·	4.4 km	MPC · JPL
37374	2001 VA_{37}	—	November 9, 2001	Socorro	LINEAR	·	8.4 km	MPC · JPL
37375	2001 VY_{39}	—	November 9, 2001	Socorro	LINEAR	·	12 km	MPC · JPL
37376	2001 VD_{42}	—	November 9, 2001	Socorro	LINEAR	·	4.4 km	MPC · JPL
37377	2001 VP_{46}	—	November 9, 2001	Socorro	LINEAR	·	3.7 km	MPC · JPL
37378	2001 VU_{76}	—	November 12, 2001	Socorro	LINEAR	H	1.8 km	MPC · JPL
37379	2001 VP_{92}	—	November 15, 2001	Socorro	LINEAR	·	5.4 km	MPC · JPL
37380	2001 VF_{94}	—	November 15, 2001	Socorro	LINEAR	·	6.5 km	MPC · JPL
37381	2001 VZ_{119}	—	November 12, 2001	Socorro	LINEAR	·	2.6 km	MPC · JPL
37382	2001 VR_{120}	—	November 12, 2001	Socorro	LINEAR	V	2.5 km	MPC · JPL
37383	2001 VM_{122}	—	November 13, 2001	Haleakala	NEAT	GEF ·	3.0 km	MPC · JPL
37384	2001 WU_{1}	—	November 18, 2001	Socorro	LINEAR	T_{j} (2.85)	6.0 km	MPC · JPL
37385	2001 WP_{27}	—	November 17, 2001	Socorro	LINEAR	·	8.6 km	MPC · JPL
37386	2001 WG_{29}	—	November 17, 2001	Socorro	LINEAR	·	3.6 km	MPC · JPL
37387	2001 WT_{29}	—	November 17, 2001	Socorro	LINEAR	·	9.0 km	MPC · JPL
37388	2001 WJ_{36}	—	November 17, 2001	Socorro	LINEAR	·	6.0 km	MPC · JPL
37389	2001 WR_{38}	—	November 17, 2001	Socorro	LINEAR	(5)	3.3 km	MPC · JPL
37390	2001 WL_{49}	—	November 30, 2001	Kingsnake	J. V. McClusky	·	8.3 km	MPC · JPL
37391 Ebre	2001 XB	Ebre	December 1, 2001	Ametlla de Mar	J. Nomen	·	4.0 km	MPC · JPL
37392 Yukiniall	2001 XP_{16}	Yukiniall	December 10, 2001	Uccle	T. Pauwels, H. M. J. Boffin	·	2.3 km	MPC · JPL
37393	2001 XF_{24}	—	December 10, 2001	Socorro	LINEAR	·	2.9 km	MPC · JPL
37394	2001 XK_{24}	—	December 10, 2001	Socorro	LINEAR	·	3.5 km	MPC · JPL
37395	2001 XJ_{30}	—	December 11, 2001	Socorro	LINEAR	·	2.4 km	MPC · JPL
37396	2001 XM_{42}	—	December 9, 2001	Socorro	LINEAR	·	5.7 km	MPC · JPL
37397	2001 XP_{47}	—	December 9, 2001	Socorro	LINEAR	·	6.2 km	MPC · JPL
37398	2001 XY_{49}	—	December 10, 2001	Socorro	LINEAR	·	8.7 km	MPC · JPL
37399	2001 XO_{61}	—	December 10, 2001	Socorro	LINEAR	NYS	2.6 km	MPC · JPL
37400	2001 XG_{67}	—	December 10, 2001	Socorro	LINEAR	THM	8.7 km	MPC · JPL

== 37401–37500 ==
back to top

Designation			Discovery			Properties		Ref
Permanent	Provisional	Named after	Date	Site	Discoverer(s)	Category	Diam.	Ref
37401	2001 XK_{74}	—	December 11, 2001	Socorro	LINEAR	·	10 km	MPC · JPL
37402	2001 XB_{98}	—	December 10, 2001	Socorro	LINEAR	·	1.8 km	MPC · JPL
37403	2001 XV_{98}	—	December 10, 2001	Socorro	LINEAR	·	12 km	MPC · JPL
37404	2001 XF_{99}	—	December 10, 2001	Socorro	LINEAR	·	2.5 km	MPC · JPL
37405	2001 XT_{100}	—	December 10, 2001	Socorro	LINEAR	·	4.7 km	MPC · JPL
37406	2001 XG_{103}	—	December 14, 2001	Socorro	LINEAR	·	2.9 km	MPC · JPL
37407	2001 XT_{113}	—	December 11, 2001	Socorro	LINEAR	·	6.3 km	MPC · JPL
37408	2001 XY_{114}	—	December 13, 2001	Socorro	LINEAR	·	5.4 km	MPC · JPL
37409	2001 XW_{115}	—	December 13, 2001	Socorro	LINEAR	·	5.7 km	MPC · JPL
37410	2001 XQ_{118}	—	December 13, 2001	Socorro	LINEAR	·	2.3 km	MPC · JPL
37411	2001 XH_{152}	—	December 14, 2001	Socorro	LINEAR	KOR	2.9 km	MPC · JPL
37412	2001 XG_{183}	—	December 14, 2001	Socorro	LINEAR	MAS	1.1 km	MPC · JPL
37413	2001 XB_{184}	—	December 14, 2001	Socorro	LINEAR	MRX	2.8 km	MPC · JPL
37414	2001 XN_{191}	—	December 14, 2001	Socorro	LINEAR	·	4.9 km	MPC · JPL
37415	2001 XQ_{196}	—	December 14, 2001	Socorro	LINEAR	·	4.1 km	MPC · JPL
37416	2001 XR_{196}	—	December 14, 2001	Socorro	LINEAR	·	6.7 km	MPC · JPL
37417	2001 XB_{197}	—	December 14, 2001	Socorro	LINEAR	·	1.7 km	MPC · JPL
37418	2001 XD_{199}	—	December 14, 2001	Socorro	LINEAR	·	3.5 km	MPC · JPL
37419	2001 XT_{199}	—	December 14, 2001	Socorro	LINEAR	·	5.7 km	MPC · JPL
37420	2001 XT_{215}	—	December 14, 2001	Socorro	LINEAR	·	6.2 km	MPC · JPL
37421	2001 XC_{217}	—	December 14, 2001	Socorro	LINEAR	HYG	7.6 km	MPC · JPL
37422	2001 XF_{241}	—	December 13, 2001	Socorro	LINEAR	·	2.7 km	MPC · JPL
37423	2001 XV_{251}	—	December 14, 2001	Socorro	LINEAR	NYS	2.6 km	MPC · JPL
37424	2001 YA_{3}	—	December 19, 2001	Fountain Hills	C. W. Juels	EUN · moon	5.9 km	MPC · JPL
37425	2001 YM_{3}	—	December 19, 2001	Fountain Hills	C. W. Juels	(5)	3.4 km	MPC · JPL
37426	2001 YU_{69}	—	December 18, 2001	Socorro	LINEAR	EOS	4.5 km	MPC · JPL
37427	2001 YJ_{82}	—	December 18, 2001	Socorro	LINEAR	·	2.3 km	MPC · JPL
37428	2001 YX_{91}	—	December 17, 2001	Palomar	NEAT	·	2.4 km	MPC · JPL
37429	2001 YE_{105}	—	December 17, 2001	Socorro	LINEAR	·	3.7 km	MPC · JPL
37430	2001 YN_{119}	—	December 19, 2001	Socorro	LINEAR	·	6.7 km	MPC · JPL
37431	2002 AT_{7}	—	January 4, 2002	Palomar	NEAT	·	2.4 km	MPC · JPL
37432 Piszkéstető	2002 AE_{11}	Piszkéstető	January 11, 2002	Piszkéstető	K. Sárneczky, Z. Heiner	ERI	4.6 km	MPC · JPL
37433	2002 AA_{19}	—	January 8, 2002	Haleakala	NEAT	·	7.9 km	MPC · JPL
37434	2002 AQ_{25}	—	January 8, 2002	Palomar	NEAT	·	8.0 km	MPC · JPL
37435	2111 P-L	—	September 24, 1960	Palomar	C. J. van Houten, I. van Houten-Groeneveld, T. Gehrels	·	9.3 km	MPC · JPL
37436	2201 P-L	—	September 24, 1960	Palomar	C. J. van Houten, I. van Houten-Groeneveld, T. Gehrels	·	6.3 km	MPC · JPL
37437	2576 P-L	—	September 24, 1960	Palomar	C. J. van Houten, I. van Houten-Groeneveld, T. Gehrels	·	4.6 km	MPC · JPL
37438	2599 P-L	—	September 24, 1960	Palomar	C. J. van Houten, I. van Houten-Groeneveld, T. Gehrels	·	4.3 km	MPC · JPL
37439	2610 P-L	—	September 24, 1960	Palomar	C. J. van Houten, I. van Houten-Groeneveld, T. Gehrels	·	3.0 km	MPC · JPL
37440	2612 P-L	—	September 24, 1960	Palomar	C. J. van Houten, I. van Houten-Groeneveld, T. Gehrels	·	5.5 km	MPC · JPL
37441	2700 P-L	—	September 24, 1960	Palomar	C. J. van Houten, I. van Houten-Groeneveld, T. Gehrels	·	2.6 km	MPC · JPL
37442	2722 P-L	—	September 24, 1960	Palomar	C. J. van Houten, I. van Houten-Groeneveld, T. Gehrels	·	7.6 km	MPC · JPL
37443	2788 P-L	—	September 26, 1960	Palomar	C. J. van Houten, I. van Houten-Groeneveld, T. Gehrels	THM	5.9 km	MPC · JPL
37444	2793 P-L	—	September 26, 1960	Palomar	C. J. van Houten, I. van Houten-Groeneveld, T. Gehrels	·	2.2 km	MPC · JPL
37445	3056 P-L	—	September 24, 1960	Palomar	C. J. van Houten, I. van Houten-Groeneveld, T. Gehrels	·	3.9 km	MPC · JPL
37446	4067 P-L	—	September 24, 1960	Palomar	C. J. van Houten, I. van Houten-Groeneveld, T. Gehrels	·	6.8 km	MPC · JPL
37447	4162 P-L	—	September 24, 1960	Palomar	C. J. van Houten, I. van Houten-Groeneveld, T. Gehrels	·	2.5 km	MPC · JPL
37448	4218 P-L	—	September 24, 1960	Palomar	C. J. van Houten, I. van Houten-Groeneveld, T. Gehrels	·	6.7 km	MPC · JPL
37449	4235 P-L	—	September 24, 1960	Palomar	C. J. van Houten, I. van Houten-Groeneveld, T. Gehrels	·	1.4 km	MPC · JPL
37450	4257 P-L	—	September 24, 1960	Palomar	C. J. van Houten, I. van Houten-Groeneveld, T. Gehrels	·	2.4 km	MPC · JPL
37451	4280 P-L	—	September 24, 1960	Palomar	C. J. van Houten, I. van Houten-Groeneveld, T. Gehrels	·	2.2 km	MPC · JPL
37452 Spirit	4282 P-L	Spirit	September 24, 1960	Palomar	C. J. van Houten, I. van Houten-Groeneveld, T. Gehrels	HIL · 3:2	8.9 km	MPC · JPL
37453	4311 P-L	—	September 24, 1960	Palomar	C. J. van Houten, I. van Houten-Groeneveld, T. Gehrels	·	2.2 km	MPC · JPL
37454	4636 P-L	—	September 24, 1960	Palomar	C. J. van Houten, I. van Houten-Groeneveld, T. Gehrels	·	10 km	MPC · JPL
37455	4727 P-L	—	September 24, 1960	Palomar	C. J. van Houten, I. van Houten-Groeneveld, T. Gehrels	·	7.9 km	MPC · JPL
37456	4790 P-L	—	September 24, 1960	Palomar	C. J. van Houten, I. van Houten-Groeneveld, T. Gehrels	·	3.2 km	MPC · JPL
37457	4793 P-L	—	September 24, 1960	Palomar	C. J. van Houten, I. van Houten-Groeneveld, T. Gehrels	·	3.0 km	MPC · JPL
37458	5008 P-L	—	October 22, 1960	Palomar	C. J. van Houten, I. van Houten-Groeneveld, T. Gehrels	·	2.7 km	MPC · JPL
37459	6037 P-L	—	September 24, 1960	Palomar	C. J. van Houten, I. van Houten-Groeneveld, T. Gehrels	·	3.3 km	MPC · JPL
37460	6102 P-L	—	September 24, 1960	Palomar	C. J. van Houten, I. van Houten-Groeneveld, T. Gehrels	NYS	2.4 km	MPC · JPL
37461	6112 P-L	—	September 24, 1960	Palomar	C. J. van Houten, I. van Houten-Groeneveld, T. Gehrels	·	2.0 km	MPC · JPL
37462	6293 P-L	—	September 24, 1960	Palomar	C. J. van Houten, I. van Houten-Groeneveld, T. Gehrels	·	2.7 km	MPC · JPL
37463	6338 P-L	—	September 24, 1960	Palomar	C. J. van Houten, I. van Houten-Groeneveld, T. Gehrels	V	1.5 km	MPC · JPL
37464	6352 P-L	—	September 24, 1960	Palomar	C. J. van Houten, I. van Houten-Groeneveld, T. Gehrels	KOR	3.2 km	MPC · JPL
37465	6618 P-L	—	September 24, 1960	Palomar	C. J. van Houten, I. van Houten-Groeneveld, T. Gehrels	MAS	1.8 km	MPC · JPL
37466	6727 P-L	—	September 24, 1960	Palomar	C. J. van Houten, I. van Houten-Groeneveld, T. Gehrels	PHO	3.6 km	MPC · JPL
37467	6753 P-L	—	September 24, 1960	Palomar	C. J. van Houten, I. van Houten-Groeneveld, T. Gehrels	·	3.8 km	MPC · JPL
37468	6782 P-L	—	September 24, 1960	Palomar	C. J. van Houten, I. van Houten-Groeneveld, T. Gehrels	·	1.9 km	MPC · JPL
37469	6833 P-L	—	September 24, 1960	Palomar	C. J. van Houten, I. van Houten-Groeneveld, T. Gehrels	·	3.9 km	MPC · JPL
37470	6834 P-L	—	September 24, 1960	Palomar	C. J. van Houten, I. van Houten-Groeneveld, T. Gehrels	·	7.7 km	MPC · JPL
37471 Popocatépetl	7082 P-L	Popocatépetl	October 17, 1960	Palomar	C. J. van Houten, I. van Houten-Groeneveld, T. Gehrels	H	2.1 km	MPC · JPL
37472	7613 P-L	—	October 17, 1960	Palomar	C. J. van Houten, I. van Houten-Groeneveld, T. Gehrels	·	11 km	MPC · JPL
37473	9066 P-L	—	September 24, 1960	Palomar	C. J. van Houten, I. van Houten-Groeneveld, T. Gehrels	·	1.9 km	MPC · JPL
37474	9618 P-L	—	October 17, 1960	Palomar	C. J. van Houten, I. van Houten-Groeneveld, T. Gehrels	·	3.5 km	MPC · JPL
37475	1038 T-1	—	March 25, 1971	Palomar	C. J. van Houten, I. van Houten-Groeneveld, T. Gehrels	·	2.9 km	MPC · JPL
37476	1107 T-1	—	March 25, 1971	Palomar	C. J. van Houten, I. van Houten-Groeneveld, T. Gehrels	·	3.5 km	MPC · JPL
37477	1110 T-1	—	March 25, 1971	Palomar	C. J. van Houten, I. van Houten-Groeneveld, T. Gehrels	·	4.8 km	MPC · JPL
37478	1120 T-1	—	March 25, 1971	Palomar	C. J. van Houten, I. van Houten-Groeneveld, T. Gehrels	·	5.2 km	MPC · JPL
37479	1130 T-1	—	March 25, 1971	Palomar	C. J. van Houten, I. van Houten-Groeneveld, T. Gehrels	·	2.0 km	MPC · JPL
37480	1149 T-1	—	March 25, 1971	Palomar	C. J. van Houten, I. van Houten-Groeneveld, T. Gehrels	MRX	2.2 km	MPC · JPL
37481	1209 T-1	—	March 25, 1971	Palomar	C. J. van Houten, I. van Houten-Groeneveld, T. Gehrels	MRX	2.7 km	MPC · JPL
37482	2114 T-1	—	March 25, 1971	Palomar	C. J. van Houten, I. van Houten-Groeneveld, T. Gehrels	·	3.8 km	MPC · JPL
37483	2125 T-1	—	March 25, 1971	Palomar	C. J. van Houten, I. van Houten-Groeneveld, T. Gehrels	·	2.4 km	MPC · JPL
37484	2174 T-1	—	March 25, 1971	Palomar	C. J. van Houten, I. van Houten-Groeneveld, T. Gehrels	·	2.0 km	MPC · JPL
37485	2211 T-1	—	March 25, 1971	Palomar	C. J. van Houten, I. van Houten-Groeneveld, T. Gehrels	·	8.2 km	MPC · JPL
37486	2282 T-1	—	March 25, 1971	Palomar	C. J. van Houten, I. van Houten-Groeneveld, T. Gehrels	·	4.6 km	MPC · JPL
37487	3150 T-1	—	March 26, 1971	Palomar	C. J. van Houten, I. van Houten-Groeneveld, T. Gehrels	·	2.3 km	MPC · JPL
37488	3203 T-1	—	March 26, 1971	Palomar	C. J. van Houten, I. van Houten-Groeneveld, T. Gehrels	(1338) (FLO)	1.6 km	MPC · JPL
37489	4396 T-1	—	March 26, 1971	Palomar	C. J. van Houten, I. van Houten-Groeneveld, T. Gehrels	PAD	5.3 km	MPC · JPL
37490	1082 T-2	—	September 29, 1973	Palomar	C. J. van Houten, I. van Houten-Groeneveld, T. Gehrels	·	6.1 km	MPC · JPL
37491	1112 T-2	—	September 29, 1973	Palomar	C. J. van Houten, I. van Houten-Groeneveld, T. Gehrels	·	5.1 km	MPC · JPL
37492	1115 T-2	—	September 29, 1973	Palomar	C. J. van Houten, I. van Houten-Groeneveld, T. Gehrels	·	1.7 km	MPC · JPL
37493	1171 T-2	—	September 29, 1973	Palomar	C. J. van Houten, I. van Houten-Groeneveld, T. Gehrels	EOS	6.1 km	MPC · JPL
37494	1174 T-2	—	September 29, 1973	Palomar	C. J. van Houten, I. van Houten-Groeneveld, T. Gehrels	·	5.5 km	MPC · JPL
37495	1226 T-2	—	September 29, 1973	Palomar	C. J. van Houten, I. van Houten-Groeneveld, T. Gehrels	·	6.2 km	MPC · JPL
37496	1287 T-2	—	September 29, 1973	Palomar	C. J. van Houten, I. van Houten-Groeneveld, T. Gehrels	·	5.2 km	MPC · JPL
37497	1330 T-2	—	September 29, 1973	Palomar	C. J. van Houten, I. van Houten-Groeneveld, T. Gehrels	·	3.0 km	MPC · JPL
37498	1507 T-2	—	September 30, 1973	Palomar	C. J. van Houten, I. van Houten-Groeneveld, T. Gehrels	·	3.8 km	MPC · JPL
37499	2033 T-2	—	September 29, 1973	Palomar	C. J. van Houten, I. van Houten-Groeneveld, T. Gehrels	·	7.3 km	MPC · JPL
37500	2118 T-2	—	September 29, 1973	Palomar	C. J. van Houten, I. van Houten-Groeneveld, T. Gehrels	·	4.2 km	MPC · JPL

== 37501–37600 ==
back to top

Designation			Discovery			Properties		Ref
Permanent	Provisional	Named after	Date	Site	Discoverer(s)	Category	Diam.	Ref
37501	2130 T-2	—	September 29, 1973	Palomar	C. J. van Houten, I. van Houten-Groeneveld, T. Gehrels	·	5.8 km	MPC · JPL
37502	2257 T-2	—	September 29, 1973	Palomar	C. J. van Houten, I. van Houten-Groeneveld, T. Gehrels	·	3.5 km	MPC · JPL
37503	2288 T-2	—	September 29, 1973	Palomar	C. J. van Houten, I. van Houten-Groeneveld, T. Gehrels	THM	7.7 km	MPC · JPL
37504	3052 T-2	—	September 30, 1973	Palomar	C. J. van Houten, I. van Houten-Groeneveld, T. Gehrels	·	5.9 km	MPC · JPL
37505	3062 T-2	—	September 30, 1973	Palomar	C. J. van Houten, I. van Houten-Groeneveld, T. Gehrels	·	6.5 km	MPC · JPL
37506	3107 T-2	—	September 30, 1973	Palomar	C. J. van Houten, I. van Houten-Groeneveld, T. Gehrels	EOS	7.1 km	MPC · JPL
37507	3141 T-2	—	September 30, 1973	Palomar	C. J. van Houten, I. van Houten-Groeneveld, T. Gehrels	·	2.5 km	MPC · JPL
37508	3190 T-2	—	September 30, 1973	Palomar	C. J. van Houten, I. van Houten-Groeneveld, T. Gehrels	GEF	3.4 km	MPC · JPL
37509	3192 T-2	—	September 30, 1973	Palomar	C. J. van Houten, I. van Houten-Groeneveld, T. Gehrels	·	6.8 km	MPC · JPL
37510	3235 T-2	—	September 30, 1973	Palomar	C. J. van Houten, I. van Houten-Groeneveld, T. Gehrels	·	5.3 km	MPC · JPL
37511	3303 T-2	—	September 30, 1973	Palomar	C. J. van Houten, I. van Houten-Groeneveld, T. Gehrels	NYS	2.0 km	MPC · JPL
37512	4197 T-2	—	September 29, 1973	Palomar	C. J. van Houten, I. van Houten-Groeneveld, T. Gehrels	·	1.9 km	MPC · JPL
37513	5068 T-2	—	September 25, 1973	Palomar	C. J. van Houten, I. van Houten-Groeneveld, T. Gehrels	·	7.0 km	MPC · JPL
37514	1118 T-3	—	October 17, 1977	Palomar	C. J. van Houten, I. van Houten-Groeneveld, T. Gehrels	VER	7.2 km	MPC · JPL
37515	2008 T-3	—	October 16, 1977	Palomar	C. J. van Houten, I. van Houten-Groeneveld, T. Gehrels	·	2.7 km	MPC · JPL
37516	2027 T-3	—	October 16, 1977	Palomar	C. J. van Houten, I. van Houten-Groeneveld, T. Gehrels	·	2.2 km	MPC · JPL
37517	2134 T-3	—	October 16, 1977	Palomar	C. J. van Houten, I. van Houten-Groeneveld, T. Gehrels	DOR	6.0 km	MPC · JPL
37518	2410 T-3	—	October 16, 1977	Palomar	C. J. van Houten, I. van Houten-Groeneveld, T. Gehrels	V	3.4 km	MPC · JPL
37519 Amphios	3040 T-3	Amphios	October 16, 1977	Palomar	C. J. van Houten, I. van Houten-Groeneveld, T. Gehrels	L5 · 010	33 km	MPC · JPL
37520	3193 T-3	—	October 16, 1977	Palomar	C. J. van Houten, I. van Houten-Groeneveld, T. Gehrels	·	6.4 km	MPC · JPL
37521	3280 T-3	—	October 16, 1977	Palomar	C. J. van Houten, I. van Houten-Groeneveld, T. Gehrels	·	3.0 km	MPC · JPL
37522	3367 T-3	—	October 16, 1977	Palomar	C. J. van Houten, I. van Houten-Groeneveld, T. Gehrels	·	4.8 km	MPC · JPL
37523	4076 T-3	—	October 16, 1977	Palomar	C. J. van Houten, I. van Houten-Groeneveld, T. Gehrels	·	10 km	MPC · JPL
37524	4375 T-3	—	October 16, 1977	Palomar	C. J. van Houten, I. van Houten-Groeneveld, T. Gehrels	·	5.3 km	MPC · JPL
37525	5127 T-3	—	October 16, 1977	Palomar	C. J. van Houten, I. van Houten-Groeneveld, T. Gehrels	·	4.5 km	MPC · JPL
37526	5721 T-3	—	October 16, 1977	Palomar	C. J. van Houten, I. van Houten-Groeneveld, T. Gehrels	·	5.7 km	MPC · JPL
37527	1971 UJ_{1}	—	October 26, 1971	Hamburg-Bergedorf	L. Kohoutek	·	6.0 km	MPC · JPL
37528	1975 SX	—	September 30, 1975	Palomar	S. J. Bus	CYB · 2:1J	7.0 km	MPC · JPL
37529 Ama-Miyayama	1977 EL_{8}	Ama-Miyayama	March 12, 1977	Kiso	H. Kosai, K. Furukawa	·	5.1 km	MPC · JPL
37530 Dancingangel	1977 RP_{7}	Dancingangel	September 11, 1977	Nauchnij	N. S. Chernykh	·	4.2 km	MPC · JPL
37531	1978 VF_{7}	—	November 7, 1978	Palomar	E. F. Helin, S. J. Bus	NYS	3.1 km	MPC · JPL
37532	1978 VL_{8}	—	November 6, 1978	Palomar	E. F. Helin, S. J. Bus	TIR	4.4 km	MPC · JPL
37533	1979 MX_{8}	—	June 25, 1979	Siding Spring	E. F. Helin, S. J. Bus	KOR	3.4 km	MPC · JPL
37534	1980 FL_{4}	—	March 16, 1980	La Silla	C.-I. Lagerkvist	·	6.1 km	MPC · JPL
37535	1981 DP	—	February 28, 1981	Siding Spring	S. J. Bus	·	2.4 km	MPC · JPL
37536	1981 EM_{2}	—	March 2, 1981	Siding Spring	S. J. Bus	·	1.8 km	MPC · JPL
37537	1981 EP_{2}	—	March 2, 1981	Siding Spring	S. J. Bus	·	10 km	MPC · JPL
37538	1981 EK_{3}	—	March 2, 1981	Siding Spring	S. J. Bus	·	2.7 km	MPC · JPL
37539	1981 EY_{4}	—	March 2, 1981	Siding Spring	S. J. Bus	·	4.6 km	MPC · JPL
37540	1981 ES_{7}	—	March 1, 1981	Siding Spring	S. J. Bus	·	2.1 km	MPC · JPL
37541	1981 EW_{7}	—	March 1, 1981	Siding Spring	S. J. Bus	ADE	5.6 km	MPC · JPL
37542	1981 EJ_{8}	—	March 1, 1981	Siding Spring	S. J. Bus	·	5.4 km	MPC · JPL
37543	1981 ER_{8}	—	March 1, 1981	Siding Spring	S. J. Bus	·	4.1 km	MPC · JPL
37544	1981 EY_{16}	—	March 6, 1981	Siding Spring	S. J. Bus	·	2.4 km	MPC · JPL
37545	1981 EA_{18}	—	March 2, 1981	Siding Spring	S. J. Bus	·	4.0 km	MPC · JPL
37546	1981 ET_{20}	—	March 2, 1981	Siding Spring	S. J. Bus	·	3.6 km	MPC · JPL
37547	1981 EH_{22}	—	March 2, 1981	Siding Spring	S. J. Bus	·	3.5 km	MPC · JPL
37548	1981 EO_{30}	—	March 2, 1981	Siding Spring	S. J. Bus	·	2.9 km	MPC · JPL
37549	1981 ET_{30}	—	March 2, 1981	Siding Spring	S. J. Bus	V	1.4 km	MPC · JPL
37550	1981 EE_{31}	—	March 2, 1981	Siding Spring	S. J. Bus	PHO	2.2 km	MPC · JPL
37551	1981 EY_{34}	—	March 2, 1981	Siding Spring	S. J. Bus	MAR	2.5 km	MPC · JPL
37552	1981 EU_{39}	—	March 2, 1981	Siding Spring	S. J. Bus	·	2.8 km	MPC · JPL
37553	1981 EN_{43}	—	March 3, 1981	Siding Spring	S. J. Bus	·	5.6 km	MPC · JPL
37554	1981 ET_{44}	—	March 7, 1981	Siding Spring	S. J. Bus	·	1.4 km	MPC · JPL
37555	1981 EG_{47}	—	March 2, 1981	Siding Spring	S. J. Bus	·	2.4 km	MPC · JPL
37556 Svyaztie	1982 QP_{3}	Svyaztie	August 28, 1982	Nauchnij	N. S. Chernykh, B. G. Marsden	·	4.0 km	MPC · JPL
37557	1984 JR	—	May 9, 1984	Palomar	Gibson, J.	NYS	2.8 km	MPC · JPL
37558	1984 SG_{6}	—	September 22, 1984	La Silla	H. Debehogne	·	6.7 km	MPC · JPL
37559	1985 UR	—	October 20, 1985	Kleť	A. Mrkos	PHO	6.2 km	MPC · JPL
37560	1986 QK_{3}	—	August 29, 1986	La Silla	H. Debehogne	·	2.5 km	MPC · JPL
37561 Churgym	1988 CR	Churgym	February 13, 1988	La Silla	E. W. Elst	H	1.5 km	MPC · JPL
37562	1988 MA	—	June 16, 1988	Palomar	E. F. Helin	PHO	3.5 km	MPC · JPL
37563	1988 SG_{2}	—	September 16, 1988	Cerro Tololo	S. J. Bus	·	3.7 km	MPC · JPL
37564	1988 TR_{3}	—	October 13, 1988	Kushiro	S. Ueda, H. Kaneda	·	9.2 km	MPC · JPL
37565 Hinoki	1988 VL_{3}	Hinoki	November 3, 1988	Kitami	T. Fujii, K. Watanabe	·	5.3 km	MPC · JPL
37566	1989 GY_{1}	—	April 3, 1989	La Silla	E. W. Elst	GEF	4.7 km	MPC · JPL
37567	1989 SC_{3}	—	September 26, 1989	La Silla	E. W. Elst	PHO	4.3 km	MPC · JPL
37568	1989 TP	—	October 4, 1989	Palomar	E. F. Helin	·	1.9 km	MPC · JPL
37569	1989 UG	—	October 23, 1989	Gekko	Y. Oshima	·	7.1 km	MPC · JPL
37570	1989 UD_{1}	—	October 25, 1989	Gekko	Y. Oshima	V	2.2 km	MPC · JPL
37571	1989 UE_{1}	—	October 25, 1989	Gekko	Y. Oshima	NYS	3.0 km	MPC · JPL
37572	1989 UC_{5}	—	October 30, 1989	Cerro Tololo	S. J. Bus	L5	10 km	MPC · JPL
37573 Enricocaruso	1989 UB_{7}	Enricocaruso	October 23, 1989	Tautenburg Observatory	F. Börngen	NYS	3.7 km	MPC · JPL
37574	1990 QE_{6}	—	August 25, 1990	Palomar	H. E. Holt	·	7.3 km	MPC · JPL
37575	1990 QD_{7}	—	August 20, 1990	La Silla	E. W. Elst	·	5.0 km	MPC · JPL
37576	1990 QW_{9}	—	August 24, 1990	Palomar	H. E. Holt	·	3.7 km	MPC · JPL
37577	1990 RG	—	September 14, 1990	Palomar	H. E. Holt	·	1.7 km	MPC · JPL
37578	1990 RY_{2}	—	September 15, 1990	Palomar	H. E. Holt	3:2	20 km	MPC · JPL
37579	1990 SO_{7}	—	September 22, 1990	La Silla	E. W. Elst	·	4.8 km	MPC · JPL
37580	1990 SH_{8}	—	September 22, 1990	La Silla	E. W. Elst	·	3.4 km	MPC · JPL
37581	1990 SU_{15}	—	September 16, 1990	Palomar	H. E. Holt	slow	4.5 km	MPC · JPL
37582 Faraday	1990 TT_{3}	Faraday	October 12, 1990	Tautenburg Observatory	F. Börngen, L. D. Schmadel	·	2.1 km	MPC · JPL
37583 Ramonkhanna	1990 TH_{8}	Ramonkhanna	October 13, 1990	Tautenburg Observatory	L. D. Schmadel, F. Börngen	·	4.6 km	MPC · JPL
37584 Schleiden	1990 TC_{9}	Schleiden	October 10, 1990	Tautenburg Observatory	F. Börngen, L. D. Schmadel	·	3.0 km	MPC · JPL
37585	1990 VQ_{8}	—	November 15, 1990	La Silla	E. W. Elst	V	2.3 km	MPC · JPL
37586 Isakaayumi	1991 BP_{2}	Isakaayumi	January 23, 1991	Kushiro	Matsuyama, M., K. Watanabe	PHO · slow	5.0 km	MPC · JPL
37587	1991 CK_{3}	—	February 14, 1991	Palomar	E. F. Helin	·	7.1 km	MPC · JPL
37588 Lynnecox	1991 GA_{2}	Lynnecox	April 15, 1991	Palomar	C. S. Shoemaker, D. H. Levy	·	3.8 km	MPC · JPL
37589	1991 NN_{9}	—	July 9, 1991	Palomar	E. F. Helin, K. J. Lawrence	·	4.3 km	MPC · JPL
37590	1991 RA_{14}	—	September 13, 1991	Palomar	H. E. Holt	T_{j} (2.98) · HIL · 3:2 · (6124)	15 km	MPC · JPL
37591	1991 TD_{4}	—	October 10, 1991	Palomar	K. J. Lawrence	·	6.1 km	MPC · JPL
37592 Pauljackson	1991 TG_{7}	Pauljackson	October 3, 1991	Tautenburg Observatory	L. D. Schmadel, F. Börngen	slow	3.2 km	MPC · JPL
37593	1991 UJ	—	October 18, 1991	Kushiro	S. Ueda, H. Kaneda	·	5.8 km	MPC · JPL
37594	1991 UJ_{1}	—	October 29, 1991	Kitt Peak	Spacewatch	NEM	5.1 km	MPC · JPL
37595	1991 UZ_{1}	—	October 29, 1991	Kushiro	S. Ueda, H. Kaneda	EOS	7.3 km	MPC · JPL
37596 Cotahuasi	1991 VV_{6}	Cotahuasi	November 9, 1991	La Silla	E. W. Elst	·	2.1 km	MPC · JPL
37597	1992 EH_{10}	—	March 2, 1992	La Silla	UESAC	THM	7.0 km	MPC · JPL
37598	1992 EL_{17}	—	March 2, 1992	La Silla	UESAC	·	2.9 km	MPC · JPL
37599	1992 EH_{18}	—	March 3, 1992	La Silla	UESAC	·	11 km	MPC · JPL
37600	1992 EO_{20}	—	March 2, 1992	La Silla	UESAC	·	3.3 km	MPC · JPL

== 37601–37700 ==
back to top

Designation			Discovery			Properties		Ref
Permanent	Provisional	Named after	Date	Site	Discoverer(s)	Category	Diam.	Ref
37601 Vicjen	1992 GC_{1}	Vicjen	April 3, 1992	Palomar	C. S. Shoemaker, D. H. Levy	PHO	3.9 km	MPC · JPL
37602	1992 HD_{1}	—	April 24, 1992	Kitt Peak	Spacewatch	·	4.3 km	MPC · JPL
37603	1992 HG_{1}	—	April 24, 1992	Kitt Peak	Spacewatch	·	4.0 km	MPC · JPL
37604	1992 OQ_{1}	—	July 26, 1992	La Silla	E. W. Elst	·	2.2 km	MPC · JPL
37605	1992 PN_{2}	—	August 2, 1992	Palomar	H. E. Holt	V	3.0 km	MPC · JPL
37606	1992 RX_{4}	—	September 2, 1992	La Silla	E. W. Elst	·	3.8 km	MPC · JPL
37607 Regineolsen	1992 RO_{7}	Regineolsen	September 2, 1992	La Silla	E. W. Elst	·	3.3 km	MPC · JPL
37608 Löns	1992 SY_{16}	Löns	September 24, 1992	Tautenburg Observatory	F. Börngen, L. D. Schmadel	·	4.0 km	MPC · JPL
37609 LaVelle	1992 WS_{4}	LaVelle	November 25, 1992	Palomar	E. M. Shoemaker, C. S. Shoemaker	·	2.9 km	MPC · JPL
37610	1993 FP_{7}	—	March 17, 1993	La Silla	UESAC	·	4.7 km	MPC · JPL
37611	1993 FR_{29}	—	March 21, 1993	La Silla	UESAC	·	6.3 km	MPC · JPL
37612	1993 FJ_{37}	—	March 19, 1993	La Silla	UESAC	·	6.8 km	MPC · JPL
37613	1993 FE_{40}	—	March 19, 1993	La Silla	UESAC	·	4.0 km	MPC · JPL
37614	1993 FT_{47}	—	March 19, 1993	La Silla	UESAC	AGN	2.8 km	MPC · JPL
37615	1993 FX_{50}	—	March 19, 1993	La Silla	UESAC	·	5.7 km	MPC · JPL
37616	1993 FK_{82}	—	March 19, 1993	La Silla	UESAC	GEF	2.8 km	MPC · JPL
37617	1993 NN_{1}	—	July 12, 1993	La Silla	E. W. Elst	·	3.9 km	MPC · JPL
37618	1993 OD_{3}	—	July 20, 1993	La Silla	E. W. Elst	EOS	6.7 km	MPC · JPL
37619	1993 OJ_{6}	—	July 20, 1993	La Silla	E. W. Elst	·	5.3 km	MPC · JPL
37620	1993 QA_{3}	—	August 16, 1993	Caussols	E. W. Elst	·	7.6 km	MPC · JPL
37621	1993 QT_{4}	—	August 18, 1993	Caussols	E. W. Elst	·	1.8 km	MPC · JPL
37622	1993 QO_{8}	—	August 20, 1993	La Silla	E. W. Elst	NYS	2.5 km	MPC · JPL
37623 Valmiera	1993 RN_{4}	Valmiera	September 15, 1993	La Silla	E. W. Elst	·	12 km	MPC · JPL
37624	1993 RT_{8}	—	September 14, 1993	La Silla	H. Debehogne, E. W. Elst	NYS	2.6 km	MPC · JPL
37625 Yonezawatatsuki	1993 SR_{1}	Yonezawatatsuki	September 16, 1993	Kitami	K. Endate, K. Watanabe	·	6.3 km	MPC · JPL
37626 Meizen	1993 SG_{2}	Meizen	September 19, 1993	Kitami	K. Endate, K. Watanabe	·	3.3 km	MPC · JPL
37627 Lucaparmitano	1993 TD	Lucaparmitano	October 11, 1993	Colleverde	V. S. Casulli	·	3.1 km	MPC · JPL
37628	1993 TK_{17}	—	October 9, 1993	La Silla	E. W. Elst	(1101)	11 km	MPC · JPL
37629	1993 TX_{19}	—	October 9, 1993	La Silla	E. W. Elst	NYS ·	3.2 km	MPC · JPL
37630 Thomasmore	1993 TM_{20}	Thomasmore	October 9, 1993	La Silla	E. W. Elst	·	2.8 km	MPC · JPL
37631	1993 TT_{27}	—	October 9, 1993	La Silla	E. W. Elst	·	1.9 km	MPC · JPL
37632	1993 TT_{37}	—	October 9, 1993	La Silla	E. W. Elst	V	1.8 km	MPC · JPL
37633	1993 TG_{39}	—	October 9, 1993	La Silla	E. W. Elst	·	2.4 km	MPC · JPL
37634	1993 UZ	—	October 19, 1993	Palomar	E. F. Helin	H	1.7 km	MPC · JPL
37635	1993 UJ_{1}	—	October 20, 1993	Palomar	E. F. Helin	H · slow	2.8 km	MPC · JPL
37636	1993 UQ_{4}	—	October 20, 1993	La Silla	E. W. Elst	·	2.5 km	MPC · JPL
37637	1993 UZ_{5}	—	October 20, 1993	La Silla	E. W. Elst	·	2.2 km	MPC · JPL
37638	1993 VB	—	November 6, 1993	Siding Spring	R. H. McNaught	APO · PHA	490 m	MPC · JPL
37639	1993 VR_{1}	—	November 11, 1993	Kushiro	S. Ueda, H. Kaneda	·	4.2 km	MPC · JPL
37640 Luiginegrelli	1993 WF	Luiginegrelli	November 20, 1993	Colleverde	V. S. Casulli	V	2.7 km	MPC · JPL
37641	1994 AO_{3}	—	January 15, 1994	Oizumi	T. Kobayashi	NYS	4.3 km	MPC · JPL
37642	1994 AA_{6}	—	January 6, 1994	Kitt Peak	Spacewatch	MAS	1.5 km	MPC · JPL
37643	1994 AX_{6}	—	January 7, 1994	Kitt Peak	Spacewatch	·	2.6 km	MPC · JPL
37644	1994 BN_{3}	—	January 16, 1994	Caussols	E. W. Elst, C. Pollas	NYS	3.2 km	MPC · JPL
37645 Chebarkul	1994 CM_{13}	Chebarkul	February 8, 1994	La Silla	E. W. Elst	·	3.0 km	MPC · JPL
37646 Falconscott	1994 CS_{13}	Falconscott	February 8, 1994	La Silla	E. W. Elst	·	5.5 km	MPC · JPL
37647	1994 ES_{3}	—	March 15, 1994	Oizumi	T. Kobayashi	EUN · slow ·	6.0 km	MPC · JPL
37648	1994 EV_{6}	—	March 9, 1994	Caussols	E. W. Elst	·	2.2 km	MPC · JPL
37649	1994 FC	—	March 19, 1994	Siding Spring	R. H. McNaught	·	3.3 km	MPC · JPL
37650	1994 FP	—	March 21, 1994	Siding Spring	R. H. McNaught	PHO	2.7 km	MPC · JPL
37651	1994 GX	—	April 3, 1994	Siding Spring	G. J. Garradd	H	1.3 km	MPC · JPL
37652	1994 JS_{1}	—	May 4, 1994	Catalina Station	C. W. Hergenrother, T. B. Spahr	·	3.6 km	MPC · JPL
37653	1994 JJ_{4}	—	May 3, 1994	Kitt Peak	Spacewatch	·	2.9 km	MPC · JPL
37654	1994 JQ_{6}	—	May 4, 1994	Kitt Peak	Spacewatch	·	3.3 km	MPC · JPL
37655 Illapa	1994 PM	Illapa	August 1, 1994	Palomar	C. S. Shoemaker, E. M. Shoemaker	APO +1km · PHA	960 m	MPC · JPL
37656	1994 PP_{6}	—	August 10, 1994	La Silla	E. W. Elst	EOS	4.1 km	MPC · JPL
37657	1994 PX_{14}	—	August 10, 1994	La Silla	E. W. Elst	EOS	4.0 km	MPC · JPL
37658	1994 PK_{18}	—	August 12, 1994	La Silla	E. W. Elst	·	5.4 km	MPC · JPL
37659	1994 PM_{20}	—	August 12, 1994	La Silla	E. W. Elst	KOR	3.6 km	MPC · JPL
37660	1994 PG_{22}	—	August 12, 1994	La Silla	E. W. Elst	·	4.8 km	MPC · JPL
37661	1994 PJ_{26}	—	August 12, 1994	La Silla	E. W. Elst	·	4.9 km	MPC · JPL
37662	1994 PT_{26}	—	August 12, 1994	La Silla	E. W. Elst	KOR	3.9 km	MPC · JPL
37663	1994 PT_{32}	—	August 12, 1994	La Silla	E. W. Elst	EOS	3.8 km	MPC · JPL
37664	1994 PF_{39}	—	August 10, 1994	La Silla	E. W. Elst	·	6.9 km	MPC · JPL
37665	1994 RH_{17}	—	September 3, 1994	La Silla	E. W. Elst	KOR	3.2 km	MPC · JPL
37666	1994 SV_{7}	—	September 28, 1994	Kitt Peak	Spacewatch	·	5.0 km	MPC · JPL
37667	1994 SZ_{7}	—	September 28, 1994	Kitt Peak	Spacewatch	·	4.2 km	MPC · JPL
37668	1994 SX_{9}	—	September 28, 1994	Kitt Peak	Spacewatch	EOS	4.6 km	MPC · JPL
37669 Haragentaro	1994 TH_{1}	Haragentaro	October 2, 1994	Kitami	K. Endate, K. Watanabe	·	9.9 km	MPC · JPL
37670	1994 TW_{12}	—	October 10, 1994	Kitt Peak	Spacewatch	·	3.8 km	MPC · JPL
37671	1994 UY_{11}	—	October 31, 1994	Palomar	PCAS	·	4.5 km	MPC · JPL
37672	1994 VC	—	November 1, 1994	Oizumi	T. Kobayashi	·	2.7 km	MPC · JPL
37673	1994 WR_{5}	—	November 28, 1994	Kitt Peak	Spacewatch	·	1.8 km	MPC · JPL
37674	1994 XH_{3}	—	December 2, 1994	Kitt Peak	Spacewatch	·	4.8 km	MPC · JPL
37675	1995 AJ_{1}	—	January 6, 1995	Nyukasa	M. Hirasawa, S. Suzuki	·	3.1 km	MPC · JPL
37676	1995 BV_{11}	—	January 29, 1995	Kitt Peak	Spacewatch	·	1.8 km	MPC · JPL
37677	1995 CA_{1}	—	February 3, 1995	Oizumi	T. Kobayashi	·	2.6 km	MPC · JPL
37678 McClure	1995 CR_{1}	McClure	February 3, 1995	Siding Spring	D. J. Asher	·	3.4 km	MPC · JPL
37679	1995 DH_{5}	—	February 22, 1995	Kitt Peak	Spacewatch	·	1.5 km	MPC · JPL
37680	1995 FD_{2}	—	March 23, 1995	Kitt Peak	Spacewatch	·	1.8 km	MPC · JPL
37681	1995 FB_{7}	—	March 23, 1995	Kitt Peak	Spacewatch	NYS	2.0 km	MPC · JPL
37682	1995 GZ_{6}	—	April 4, 1995	Xinglong	SCAP	·	2.9 km	MPC · JPL
37683 Gustaveeiffel	1995 KK	Gustaveeiffel	May 19, 1995	Colleverde	V. S. Casulli	·	2.8 km	MPC · JPL
37684	1995 NE	—	July 1, 1995	Kitt Peak	Spacewatch	·	2.3 km	MPC · JPL
37685	1995 OU_{2}	—	July 22, 1995	Kitt Peak	Spacewatch	L4	22 km	MPC · JPL
37686	1995 OR_{3}	—	July 22, 1995	Kitt Peak	Spacewatch	·	4.4 km	MPC · JPL
37687 Chunghikoh	1995 QB_{10}	Chunghikoh	August 30, 1995	Socorro	R. Weber	MAR	3.9 km	MPC · JPL
37688	1995 ST_{17}	—	September 18, 1995	Kitt Peak	Spacewatch	·	2.9 km	MPC · JPL
37689	1995 SH_{70}	—	September 27, 1995	Kitt Peak	Spacewatch	·	3.4 km	MPC · JPL
37690	1995 UV_{16}	—	October 17, 1995	Kitt Peak	Spacewatch	(5)	2.9 km	MPC · JPL
37691	1995 UN_{74}	—	October 21, 1995	Kitt Peak	Spacewatch	·	6.3 km	MPC · JPL
37692 Loribragg	1995 VX	Loribragg	November 12, 1995	Haleakala	AMOS	KOR	3.0 km	MPC · JPL
37693 Utofumiaki	1995 VQ_{1}	Utofumiaki	November 15, 1995	Kitami	K. Endate, K. Watanabe	·	4.7 km	MPC · JPL
37694	1995 WC_{6}	—	November 26, 1995	Kleť	Kleť	·	4.8 km	MPC · JPL
37695	1995 WT_{10}	—	November 16, 1995	Kitt Peak	Spacewatch	KOR	2.1 km	MPC · JPL
37696	1995 WE_{27}	—	November 18, 1995	Kitt Peak	Spacewatch	·	5.4 km	MPC · JPL
37697	1995 YW_{4}	—	December 16, 1995	Kitt Peak	Spacewatch	·	4.3 km	MPC · JPL
37698	1995 YL_{8}	—	December 18, 1995	Kitt Peak	Spacewatch	KOR	3.7 km	MPC · JPL
37699 Santini-Aichl	1996 AH_{1}	Santini-Aichl	January 13, 1996	Kleť	J. Tichá, M. Tichý	·	7.3 km	MPC · JPL
37700	1996 AL_{3}	—	January 10, 1996	Haleakala	AMOS	·	5.1 km	MPC · JPL

== 37701–37800 ==
back to top

Designation			Discovery			Properties		Ref
Permanent	Provisional	Named after	Date	Site	Discoverer(s)	Category	Diam.	Ref
37701	1996 AR_{8}	—	January 13, 1996	Kitt Peak	Spacewatch	VER	7.7 km	MPC · JPL
37702	1996 BB_{9}	—	January 20, 1996	Kitt Peak	Spacewatch	·	6.4 km	MPC · JPL
37703	1996 CD_{1}	—	February 11, 1996	Xinglong	SCAP	H	1.5 km	MPC · JPL
37704	1996 EK_{9}	—	March 12, 1996	Kitt Peak	Spacewatch	·	7.5 km	MPC · JPL
37705	1996 GD_{20}	—	April 15, 1996	La Silla	E. W. Elst	·	2.1 km	MPC · JPL
37706 Trinchieri	1996 RN	Trinchieri	September 8, 1996	Sormano	Giuliani, V., P. Chiavenna	·	2.4 km	MPC · JPL
37707	1996 RK_{3}	—	September 15, 1996	Prescott	P. G. Comba	·	1.9 km	MPC · JPL
37708	1996 RX_{3}	—	September 13, 1996	Haleakala	NEAT	·	2.9 km	MPC · JPL
37709	1996 RL_{4}	—	September 12, 1996	Haleakala	NEAT	·	2.9 km	MPC · JPL
37710	1996 RD_{12}	—	September 8, 1996	Kitt Peak	Spacewatch	L4	20 km	MPC · JPL
37711	1996 RP_{12}	—	September 8, 1996	Kitt Peak	Spacewatch	V	1.9 km	MPC · JPL
37712	1996 RD_{14}	—	September 8, 1996	Kitt Peak	Spacewatch	·	2.9 km	MPC · JPL
37713	1996 RY_{22}	—	September 13, 1996	Kitt Peak	Spacewatch	·	1.9 km	MPC · JPL
37714	1996 RK_{29}	—	September 11, 1996	La Silla	Uppsala-DLR Trojan Survey	L4	14 km	MPC · JPL
37715	1996 RN_{31}	—	September 13, 1996	La Silla	Uppsala-DLR Trojan Survey	L4	19 km	MPC · JPL
37716	1996 RP_{32}	—	September 15, 1996	La Silla	Uppsala-DLR Trojan Survey	L4	15 km	MPC · JPL
37717	1996 RQ_{33}	—	September 11, 1996	La Silla	C.-I. Lagerkvist	PHO	5.4 km	MPC · JPL
37718	1996 SR_{4}	—	September 20, 1996	Xinglong	SCAP	·	2.8 km	MPC · JPL
37719	1996 SG_{6}	—	September 18, 1996	Xinglong	SCAP	NYS	2.5 km	MPC · JPL
37720 Kawanishi	1996 SH_{7}	Kawanishi	September 23, 1996	Nanyo	T. Okuni	NYS	3.7 km	MPC · JPL
37721	1996 TX_{8}	—	October 10, 1996	Catalina Station	T. B. Spahr	PHO	2.8 km	MPC · JPL
37722	1996 TC_{13}	—	October 12, 1996	Farra d'Isonzo	Farra d'Isonzo	·	3.1 km	MPC · JPL
37723	1996 TX_{28}	—	October 7, 1996	Kitt Peak	Spacewatch	·	2.6 km	MPC · JPL
37724	1996 TP_{30}	—	October 7, 1996	Kitt Peak	Spacewatch	NYS	2.3 km	MPC · JPL
37725	1996 TA_{35}	—	October 11, 1996	Kitt Peak	Spacewatch	·	3.5 km	MPC · JPL
37726	1996 TK_{36}	—	October 12, 1996	Kitt Peak	Spacewatch	·	4.3 km	MPC · JPL
37727	1996 TE_{39}	—	October 8, 1996	La Silla	E. W. Elst	·	1.6 km	MPC · JPL
37728	1996 TG_{39}	—	October 8, 1996	La Silla	E. W. Elst	ERI	5.2 km	MPC · JPL
37729 Akiratakao	1996 TK_{54}	Akiratakao	October 14, 1996	Geisei	T. Seki	·	7.2 km	MPC · JPL
37730	1996 TA_{55}	—	October 10, 1996	Xinglong	SCAP	·	4.2 km	MPC · JPL
37731	1996 TY_{64}	—	October 5, 1996	Xinglong	SCAP	·	2.0 km	MPC · JPL
37732	1996 TY_{68}	—	October 10, 1996	La Silla	C.-I. Lagerkvist	L4	21 km	MPC · JPL
37733	1996 UD_{1}	—	October 16, 1996	Church Stretton	S. P. Laurie	·	2.6 km	MPC · JPL
37734 Bonacina	1996 UR_{3}	Bonacina	October 30, 1996	Sormano	A. Testa, Giuliani, V.	·	2.3 km	MPC · JPL
37735 Riccardomuti	1996 VL	Riccardomuti	November 1, 1996	Colleverde	V. S. Casulli	·	2.2 km	MPC · JPL
37736 Jandl	1996 VU_{6}	Jandl	November 15, 1996	Kleť	J. Tichá, M. Tichý	·	3.6 km	MPC · JPL
37737	1996 VS_{13}	—	November 5, 1996	Kitt Peak	Spacewatch	·	2.3 km	MPC · JPL
37738	1996 VM_{14}	—	November 5, 1996	Kitt Peak	Spacewatch	·	2.7 km	MPC · JPL
37739	1996 VC_{15}	—	November 5, 1996	Kitt Peak	Spacewatch	·	2.8 km	MPC · JPL
37740	1996 VU_{29}	—	November 7, 1996	Kushiro	S. Ueda, H. Kaneda	·	4.3 km	MPC · JPL
37741	1996 WR_{1}	—	November 30, 1996	Oizumi	T. Kobayashi	·	3.6 km	MPC · JPL
37742	1996 WB_{2}	—	November 30, 1996	Dossobuono	Lai, L.	·	5.0 km	MPC · JPL
37743	1996 XQ	—	December 1, 1996	Chichibu	N. Satō	·	2.1 km	MPC · JPL
37744	1996 XU_{14}	—	December 8, 1996	Catalina Station	C. W. Hergenrother	H	2.3 km	MPC · JPL
37745	1996 XD_{22}	—	December 8, 1996	Kitt Peak	Spacewatch	·	3.3 km	MPC · JPL
37746	1996 XD_{32}	—	December 14, 1996	Chichibu	N. Satō	·	5.1 km	MPC · JPL
37747	1996 YS	—	December 20, 1996	Oizumi	T. Kobayashi	·	8.6 km	MPC · JPL
37748	1997 AF_{2}	—	January 3, 1997	Oizumi	T. Kobayashi	GEF	3.5 km	MPC · JPL
37749 Umbertobonori	1997 AG_{18}	Umbertobonori	January 12, 1997	Bologna	San Vittore	·	5.1 km	MPC · JPL
37750	1997 BZ	—	January 19, 1997	Xinglong	SCAP	ADE	10 km	MPC · JPL
37751	1997 CH_{1}	—	February 1, 1997	Oizumi	T. Kobayashi	·	9.3 km	MPC · JPL
37752	1997 CR_{12}	—	February 3, 1997	Kitt Peak	Spacewatch	·	3.9 km	MPC · JPL
37753	1997 CO_{13}	—	February 7, 1997	Kleť	Kleť	KOR	3.2 km	MPC · JPL
37754	1997 CX_{15}	—	February 6, 1997	Kitt Peak	Spacewatch	KOR	3.5 km	MPC · JPL
37755	1997 EA	—	March 1, 1997	Oizumi	T. Kobayashi	·	7.0 km	MPC · JPL
37756	1997 EH_{11}	—	March 3, 1997	Farra d'Isonzo	Farra d'Isonzo	·	5.9 km	MPC · JPL
37757	1997 EG_{26}	—	March 4, 1997	Kitt Peak	Spacewatch	·	4.3 km	MPC · JPL
37758	1997 EB_{36}	—	March 4, 1997	Socorro	LINEAR	·	4.0 km	MPC · JPL
37759	1997 EL_{36}	—	March 4, 1997	Socorro	LINEAR	GEF	3.6 km	MPC · JPL
37760	1997 EG_{41}	—	March 10, 1997	Socorro	LINEAR	GEF	5.0 km	MPC · JPL
37761	1997 EN_{51}	—	March 5, 1997	La Silla	E. W. Elst	THM	7.6 km	MPC · JPL
37762	1997 GU_{1}	—	April 2, 1997	Kitt Peak	Spacewatch	·	5.0 km	MPC · JPL
37763	1997 GB_{3}	—	April 7, 1997	Kitt Peak	Spacewatch	EOS	4.5 km	MPC · JPL
37764 Omirika	1997 GT_{3}	Omirika	April 2, 1997	Kitami	K. Endate, K. Watanabe	EOS	7.8 km	MPC · JPL
37765	1997 GF_{11}	—	April 3, 1997	Socorro	LINEAR	·	6.6 km	MPC · JPL
37766	1997 GM_{11}	—	April 3, 1997	Socorro	LINEAR	·	5.1 km	MPC · JPL
37767	1997 GP_{16}	—	April 3, 1997	Socorro	LINEAR	·	3.6 km	MPC · JPL
37768	1997 GV_{16}	—	April 3, 1997	Socorro	LINEAR	EOS	5.7 km	MPC · JPL
37769	1997 GJ_{18}	—	April 3, 1997	Socorro	LINEAR	·	10 km	MPC · JPL
37770	1997 GQ_{21}	—	April 6, 1997	Socorro	LINEAR	HYG	4.7 km	MPC · JPL
37771	1997 GQ_{22}	—	April 6, 1997	Socorro	LINEAR	·	12 km	MPC · JPL
37772	1997 GF_{23}	—	April 6, 1997	Socorro	LINEAR	·	12 km	MPC · JPL
37773	1997 GY_{24}	—	April 7, 1997	Goodricke-Pigott	Chamberlin, M. T.	·	4.1 km	MPC · JPL
37774	1997 GC_{25}	—	April 7, 1997	Kitt Peak	Spacewatch	·	2.6 km	MPC · JPL
37775	1997 GY_{26}	—	April 7, 1997	Kitt Peak	Spacewatch	THM	7.6 km	MPC · JPL
37776	1997 GW_{28}	—	April 8, 1997	Kitt Peak	Spacewatch	V	1.5 km	MPC · JPL
37777 Pérez-Reverte	1997 GE_{32}	Pérez-Reverte	April 12, 1997	Majorca	Á. López J., R. Pacheco	·	6.7 km	MPC · JPL
37778	1997 HE_{2}	—	April 29, 1997	Kitt Peak	Spacewatch	·	6.7 km	MPC · JPL
37779	1997 HE_{10}	—	April 30, 1997	Socorro	LINEAR	·	5.1 km	MPC · JPL
37780	1997 HO_{11}	—	April 30, 1997	Socorro	LINEAR	·	6.6 km	MPC · JPL
37781	1997 HB_{13}	—	April 30, 1997	Socorro	LINEAR	·	11 km	MPC · JPL
37782 Jacquespiccard	1997 JP_{11}	Jacquespiccard	May 3, 1997	La Silla	E. W. Elst	·	4.8 km	MPC · JPL
37783	1997 MP_{2}	—	June 28, 1997	Socorro	LINEAR	GEF	4.2 km	MPC · JPL
37784	1997 SY_{2}	—	September 23, 1997	Farra d'Isonzo	Farra d'Isonzo	·	2.1 km	MPC · JPL
37785 Nougaro	1997 SL_{15}	Nougaro	September 27, 1997	Caussols	ODAS	·	1.8 km	MPC · JPL
37786 Tokikonaruko	1997 SS_{17}	Tokikonaruko	September 30, 1997	Moriyama	Ikari, Y.	·	1.4 km	MPC · JPL
37787	1997 SX_{24}	—	September 30, 1997	Kitt Peak	Spacewatch	·	2.1 km	MPC · JPL
37788 Suchan	1997 SK_{34}	Suchan	September 25, 1997	Ondřejov	Ondrejov	·	1.6 km	MPC · JPL
37789	1997 UL_{16}	—	October 23, 1997	Kitt Peak	Spacewatch	L4	15 km	MPC · JPL
37790	1997 UX_{26}	—	October 27, 1997	La Silla	Uppsala-DLR Trojan Survey	L4	13 km	MPC · JPL
37791	1997 VB_{4}	—	November 7, 1997	Prescott	P. G. Comba	·	2.5 km	MPC · JPL
37792	1997 VQ_{7}	—	November 2, 1997	Xinglong	SCAP	·	2.3 km	MPC · JPL
37793	1997 WE	—	November 18, 1997	Oizumi	T. Kobayashi	·	3.0 km	MPC · JPL
37794	1997 WP_{7}	—	November 19, 1997	Nachi-Katsuura	Y. Shimizu, T. Urata	·	2.3 km	MPC · JPL
37795	1997 WC_{8}	—	November 24, 1997	Oizumi	T. Kobayashi	·	2.1 km	MPC · JPL
37796	1997 WK_{13}	—	November 24, 1997	Nachi-Katsuura	Y. Shimizu, T. Urata	·	3.9 km	MPC · JPL
37797	1997 WU_{15}	—	November 23, 1997	Kitt Peak	Spacewatch	·	1.7 km	MPC · JPL
37798	1997 WU_{24}	—	November 28, 1997	Kitt Peak	Spacewatch	·	1.3 km	MPC · JPL
37799	1997 WC_{31}	—	November 29, 1997	Socorro	LINEAR	·	2.2 km	MPC · JPL
37800	1997 WW_{36}	—	November 29, 1997	Socorro	LINEAR	·	1.8 km	MPC · JPL

== 37801–37900 ==
back to top

Designation			Discovery			Properties		Ref
Permanent	Provisional	Named after	Date	Site	Discoverer(s)	Category	Diam.	Ref
37801	1997 WO_{47}	—	November 19, 1997	Xinglong	SCAP	·	5.1 km	MPC · JPL
37802	1997 XD_{11}	—	December 3, 1997	Kitt Peak	Spacewatch	·	2.5 km	MPC · JPL
37803	1997 YY	—	December 20, 1997	Oizumi	T. Kobayashi	·	2.1 km	MPC · JPL
37804	1997 YE_{4}	—	December 23, 1997	Xinglong	SCAP	·	2.8 km	MPC · JPL
37805	1997 YM_{10}	—	December 28, 1997	Oizumi	T. Kobayashi	·	3.3 km	MPC · JPL
37806	1997 YQ_{11}	—	December 30, 1997	Oizumi	T. Kobayashi	·	3.2 km	MPC · JPL
37807	1997 YZ_{12}	—	December 27, 1997	Kitt Peak	Spacewatch	·	1.9 km	MPC · JPL
37808	1997 YL_{14}	—	December 31, 1997	Oizumi	T. Kobayashi	·	5.6 km	MPC · JPL
37809	1997 YU_{15}	—	December 29, 1997	Kitt Peak	Spacewatch	NYS	2.4 km	MPC · JPL
37810	1997 YP_{17}	—	December 31, 1997	Kitt Peak	Spacewatch	·	2.5 km	MPC · JPL
37811	1998 AR_{4}	—	January 6, 1998	Kitt Peak	Spacewatch	·	2.6 km	MPC · JPL
37812	1998 AB_{6}	—	January 8, 1998	Caussols	ODAS	NYS	2.5 km	MPC · JPL
37813	1998 AM_{6}	—	January 4, 1998	Xinglong	SCAP	·	2.3 km	MPC · JPL
37814	1998 AT_{6}	—	January 4, 1998	Xinglong	SCAP	V	2.1 km	MPC · JPL
37815	1998 BK_{1}	—	January 19, 1998	Oizumi	T. Kobayashi	NYS	3.9 km	MPC · JPL
37816	1998 BT_{2}	—	January 19, 1998	Nachi-Katsuura	Y. Shimizu, T. Urata	·	4.4 km	MPC · JPL
37817	1998 BV_{2}	—	January 19, 1998	Nachi-Katsuura	Y. Shimizu, T. Urata	MAS	3.1 km	MPC · JPL
37818 Juliamaury	1998 BC_{5}	Juliamaury	January 18, 1998	Caussols	ODAS	·	2.5 km	MPC · JPL
37819	1998 BE_{5}	—	January 20, 1998	Woomera	F. B. Zoltowski	·	2.2 km	MPC · JPL
37820	1998 BL_{8}	—	January 25, 1998	Oizumi	T. Kobayashi	PHO	7.0 km	MPC · JPL
37821	1998 BM_{8}	—	January 25, 1998	Oizumi	T. Kobayashi	PHO	2.9 km	MPC · JPL
37822	1998 BQ_{8}	—	January 25, 1998	Oizumi	T. Kobayashi	·	1.9 km	MPC · JPL
37823	1998 BS_{8}	—	January 25, 1998	Oizumi	T. Kobayashi	NYS	3.5 km	MPC · JPL
37824	1998 BU_{14}	—	January 25, 1998	Nachi-Katsuura	Y. Shimizu, T. Urata	V	2.9 km	MPC · JPL
37825	1998 BM_{17}	—	January 22, 1998	Kitt Peak	Spacewatch	MAS	2.5 km	MPC · JPL
37826	1998 BS_{24}	—	January 28, 1998	Oizumi	T. Kobayashi	·	3.2 km	MPC · JPL
37827	1998 BR_{32}	—	January 29, 1998	Caussols	ODAS	·	3.5 km	MPC · JPL
37828	1998 BK_{33}	—	January 31, 1998	Oizumi	T. Kobayashi	V · slow	3.7 km	MPC · JPL
37829	1998 BQ_{33}	—	January 31, 1998	Oizumi	T. Kobayashi	·	2.4 km	MPC · JPL
37830	1998 BX_{33}	—	January 31, 1998	Oizumi	T. Kobayashi	PHO	4.4 km	MPC · JPL
37831	1998 BH_{36}	—	January 27, 1998	Uccle	E. W. Elst	·	3.0 km	MPC · JPL
37832	1998 BA_{38}	—	January 29, 1998	Kitt Peak	Spacewatch	·	3.2 km	MPC · JPL
37833	1998 BL_{39}	—	January 29, 1998	Kitt Peak	Spacewatch	·	3.3 km	MPC · JPL
37834	1998 BG_{41}	—	January 25, 1998	Haleakala	NEAT	·	2.8 km	MPC · JPL
37835 Darioconsigli	1998 BC_{44}	Darioconsigli	January 25, 1998	Cima Ekar	U. Munari, M. Tombelli	ERI	5.2 km	MPC · JPL
37836 Simoneterreni	1998 BD_{44}	Simoneterreni	January 25, 1998	Cima Ekar	U. Munari, M. Tombelli	·	4.1 km	MPC · JPL
37837	1998 CA_{2}	—	February 9, 1998	Xinglong	SCAP	·	3.6 km	MPC · JPL
37838	1998 DF	—	February 17, 1998	Bédoin	P. Antonini	·	2.9 km	MPC · JPL
37839	1998 DX_{1}	—	February 19, 1998	Farra d'Isonzo	Farra d'Isonzo	·	2.1 km	MPC · JPL
37840 Gramegna	1998 DA_{3}	Gramegna	February 20, 1998	Bologna	San Vittore	·	3.4 km	MPC · JPL
37841	1998 DQ_{4}	—	February 22, 1998	Haleakala	NEAT	·	3.7 km	MPC · JPL
37842	1998 DT_{4}	—	February 22, 1998	Haleakala	NEAT	V	2.1 km	MPC · JPL
37843	1998 DA_{6}	—	February 22, 1998	Haleakala	NEAT	NYS	3.0 km	MPC · JPL
37844	1998 DD_{6}	—	February 22, 1998	Haleakala	NEAT	NYS	3.4 km	MPC · JPL
37845	1998 DF_{6}	—	February 22, 1998	Haleakala	NEAT	·	3.4 km	MPC · JPL
37846	1998 DV_{6}	—	February 17, 1998	Kitt Peak	Spacewatch	V	2.2 km	MPC · JPL
37847	1998 DH_{9}	—	February 22, 1998	Haleakala	NEAT	·	3.3 km	MPC · JPL
37848 Michelmeunier	1998 DB_{14}	Michelmeunier	February 27, 1998	Caussols	ODAS	·	3.7 km	MPC · JPL
37849	1998 DP_{16}	—	February 22, 1998	Kitt Peak	Spacewatch	·	3.6 km	MPC · JPL
37850	1998 DX_{21}	—	February 22, 1998	Kitt Peak	Spacewatch	·	2.9 km	MPC · JPL
37851	1998 DH_{26}	—	February 24, 1998	Kitt Peak	Spacewatch	NYS	2.9 km	MPC · JPL
37852	1998 DG_{32}	—	February 22, 1998	Xinglong	SCAP	·	2.5 km	MPC · JPL
37853 Danielbarbier	1998 DB_{35}	Danielbarbier	February 27, 1998	La Silla	E. W. Elst	·	6.1 km	MPC · JPL
37854	1998 EY_{11}	—	March 1, 1998	La Silla	E. W. Elst	fast?	3.6 km	MPC · JPL
37855	1998 EE_{12}	—	March 1, 1998	La Silla	E. W. Elst	·	4.8 km	MPC · JPL
37856	1998 EV_{12}	—	March 1, 1998	La Silla	E. W. Elst	NYS	2.7 km	MPC · JPL
37857	1998 EV_{14}	—	March 5, 1998	Reedy Creek	J. Broughton	·	3.8 km	MPC · JPL
37858	1998 EX_{15}	—	March 3, 1998	Socorro	LINEAR	V	2.0 km	MPC · JPL
37859 Bobkoff	1998 FE_{3}	Bobkoff	March 23, 1998	Ondřejov	P. Pravec	·	6.3 km	MPC · JPL
37860	1998 FP_{4}	—	March 23, 1998	Kitt Peak	Spacewatch	HNS	3.6 km	MPC · JPL
37861	1998 FA_{5}	—	March 23, 1998	Prescott	P. G. Comba	·	3.8 km	MPC · JPL
37862	1998 FR_{5}	—	March 24, 1998	Prescott	P. G. Comba	(5)	2.7 km	MPC · JPL
37863	1998 FB_{7}	—	March 20, 1998	Kitt Peak	Spacewatch	·	3.9 km	MPC · JPL
37864	1998 FJ_{10}	—	March 24, 1998	Caussols	ODAS	·	2.3 km	MPC · JPL
37865 Georgesattard	1998 FS_{15}	Georgesattard	March 28, 1998	Caussols	ODAS	·	3.1 km	MPC · JPL
37866	1998 FU_{15}	—	March 28, 1998	Caussols	ODAS	·	5.4 km	MPC · JPL
37867	1998 FO_{16}	—	March 20, 1998	Socorro	LINEAR	MAS	2.6 km	MPC · JPL
37868	1998 FH_{18}	—	March 20, 1998	Socorro	LINEAR	·	4.1 km	MPC · JPL
37869	1998 FN_{21}	—	March 20, 1998	Socorro	LINEAR	·	3.2 km	MPC · JPL
37870	1998 FJ_{23}	—	March 20, 1998	Socorro	LINEAR	MAS	2.6 km	MPC · JPL
37871	1998 FB_{28}	—	March 20, 1998	Socorro	LINEAR	·	3.8 km	MPC · JPL
37872	1998 FW_{28}	—	March 20, 1998	Socorro	LINEAR	·	2.4 km	MPC · JPL
37873	1998 FM_{29}	—	March 20, 1998	Socorro	LINEAR	·	3.0 km	MPC · JPL
37874	1998 FX_{29}	—	March 20, 1998	Socorro	LINEAR	·	5.6 km	MPC · JPL
37875	1998 FV_{34}	—	March 20, 1998	Socorro	LINEAR	·	2.9 km	MPC · JPL
37876	1998 FY_{37}	—	March 20, 1998	Socorro	LINEAR	·	3.5 km	MPC · JPL
37877	1998 FX_{41}	—	March 20, 1998	Socorro	LINEAR	·	2.9 km	MPC · JPL
37878	1998 FG_{43}	—	March 20, 1998	Socorro	LINEAR	·	4.9 km	MPC · JPL
37879	1998 FB_{47}	—	March 20, 1998	Socorro	LINEAR	slow	3.3 km	MPC · JPL
37880	1998 FP_{47}	—	March 20, 1998	Socorro	LINEAR	·	3.6 km	MPC · JPL
37881	1998 FL_{48}	—	March 20, 1998	Socorro	LINEAR	·	2.8 km	MPC · JPL
37882	1998 FE_{49}	—	March 20, 1998	Socorro	LINEAR	·	2.6 km	MPC · JPL
37883	1998 FA_{51}	—	March 20, 1998	Socorro	LINEAR	MAR	2.9 km	MPC · JPL
37884	1998 FH_{54}	—	March 20, 1998	Socorro	LINEAR	·	3.9 km	MPC · JPL
37885	1998 FG_{56}	—	March 20, 1998	Socorro	LINEAR	RAF	3.9 km	MPC · JPL
37886	1998 FH_{56}	—	March 20, 1998	Socorro	LINEAR	·	2.7 km	MPC · JPL
37887	1998 FQ_{58}	—	March 20, 1998	Socorro	LINEAR	·	2.7 km	MPC · JPL
37888	1998 FG_{59}	—	March 20, 1998	Socorro	LINEAR	·	3.3 km	MPC · JPL
37889	1998 FW_{59}	—	March 20, 1998	Socorro	LINEAR	MAR	2.6 km	MPC · JPL
37890	1998 FY_{59}	—	March 20, 1998	Socorro	LINEAR	·	2.7 km	MPC · JPL
37891	1998 FY_{60}	—	March 20, 1998	Socorro	LINEAR	·	4.0 km	MPC · JPL
37892	1998 FA_{61}	—	March 20, 1998	Socorro	LINEAR	MAR	3.6 km	MPC · JPL
37893	1998 FR_{61}	—	March 20, 1998	Socorro	LINEAR	·	3.5 km	MPC · JPL
37894	1998 FE_{62}	—	March 20, 1998	Socorro	LINEAR	·	5.1 km	MPC · JPL
37895	1998 FJ_{62}	—	March 20, 1998	Socorro	LINEAR	·	4.8 km	MPC · JPL
37896	1998 FV_{62}	—	March 20, 1998	Socorro	LINEAR	EOS	5.8 km	MPC · JPL
37897	1998 FP_{64}	—	March 20, 1998	Socorro	LINEAR	·	7.7 km	MPC · JPL
37898	1998 FG_{65}	—	March 20, 1998	Socorro	LINEAR	·	4.3 km	MPC · JPL
37899	1998 FZ_{65}	—	March 20, 1998	Socorro	LINEAR	·	2.4 km	MPC · JPL
37900	1998 FF_{66}	—	March 20, 1998	Socorro	LINEAR	·	2.6 km	MPC · JPL

== 37901–38000 ==
back to top

Designation			Discovery			Properties		Ref
Permanent	Provisional	Named after	Date	Site	Discoverer(s)	Category	Diam.	Ref
37901	1998 FW_{66}	—	March 20, 1998	Socorro	LINEAR	DOR	6.2 km	MPC · JPL
37902	1998 FH_{67}	—	March 20, 1998	Socorro	LINEAR	·	4.1 km	MPC · JPL
37903	1998 FU_{67}	—	March 20, 1998	Socorro	LINEAR	·	3.0 km	MPC · JPL
37904	1998 FU_{68}	—	March 20, 1998	Socorro	LINEAR	ADE	7.0 km	MPC · JPL
37905	1998 FU_{70}	—	March 20, 1998	Socorro	LINEAR	HNS	3.5 km	MPC · JPL
37906	1998 FR_{73}	—	March 28, 1998	Stroncone	Santa Lucia	·	5.0 km	MPC · JPL
37907	1998 FD_{76}	—	March 24, 1998	Socorro	LINEAR	·	4.4 km	MPC · JPL
37908	1998 FA_{78}	—	March 24, 1998	Socorro	LINEAR	·	4.0 km	MPC · JPL
37909	1998 FT_{79}	—	March 24, 1998	Socorro	LINEAR	·	3.3 km	MPC · JPL
37910	1998 FS_{84}	—	March 24, 1998	Socorro	LINEAR	·	4.4 km	MPC · JPL
37911	1998 FA_{85}	—	March 24, 1998	Socorro	LINEAR	·	3.8 km	MPC · JPL
37912	1998 FG_{90}	—	March 24, 1998	Socorro	LINEAR	(5)	4.3 km	MPC · JPL
37913	1998 FO_{90}	—	March 24, 1998	Socorro	LINEAR	NYS	2.0 km	MPC · JPL
37914	1998 FK_{94}	—	March 24, 1998	Socorro	LINEAR	EUN	4.1 km	MPC · JPL
37915	1998 FK_{101}	—	March 31, 1998	Socorro	LINEAR	·	3.0 km	MPC · JPL
37916	1998 FN_{101}	—	March 31, 1998	Socorro	LINEAR	EUN · slow	3.6 km	MPC · JPL
37917	1998 FJ_{103}	—	March 31, 1998	Socorro	LINEAR	·	6.0 km	MPC · JPL
37918	1998 FD_{104}	—	March 31, 1998	Socorro	LINEAR	·	5.4 km	MPC · JPL
37919	1998 FO_{104}	—	March 31, 1998	Socorro	LINEAR	·	6.1 km	MPC · JPL
37920	1998 FC_{109}	—	March 31, 1998	Socorro	LINEAR	·	3.8 km	MPC · JPL
37921	1998 FM_{109}	—	March 31, 1998	Socorro	LINEAR	·	5.7 km	MPC · JPL
37922	1998 FQ_{109}	—	March 31, 1998	Socorro	LINEAR	·	5.0 km	MPC · JPL
37923	1998 FD_{113}	—	March 31, 1998	Socorro	LINEAR	slow	13 km	MPC · JPL
37924	1998 FB_{114}	—	March 31, 1998	Socorro	LINEAR	MAR	3.6 km	MPC · JPL
37925	1998 FL_{114}	—	March 31, 1998	Socorro	LINEAR	ADE	8.2 km	MPC · JPL
37926	1998 FX_{114}	—	March 31, 1998	Socorro	LINEAR	·	4.0 km	MPC · JPL
37927	1998 FS_{115}	—	March 31, 1998	Socorro	LINEAR	EUN	2.7 km	MPC · JPL
37928	1998 FO_{121}	—	March 20, 1998	Socorro	LINEAR	·	2.3 km	MPC · JPL
37929	1998 FY_{122}	—	March 20, 1998	Socorro	LINEAR	·	5.5 km	MPC · JPL
37930	1998 FG_{123}	—	March 20, 1998	Socorro	LINEAR	EUN	5.0 km	MPC · JPL
37931	1998 FG_{125}	—	March 24, 1998	Socorro	LINEAR	·	3.4 km	MPC · JPL
37932	1998 FF_{129}	—	March 22, 1998	Socorro	LINEAR	·	4.0 km	MPC · JPL
37933	1998 FM_{140}	—	March 29, 1998	Socorro	LINEAR	·	6.1 km	MPC · JPL
37934	1998 FO_{141}	—	March 29, 1998	Socorro	LINEAR	EUN	4.1 km	MPC · JPL
37935	1998 GW	—	April 3, 1998	Kitt Peak	Spacewatch	RAF	4.0 km	MPC · JPL
37936	1998 GH_{1}	—	April 4, 1998	Woomera	F. B. Zoltowski	DOR	8.4 km	MPC · JPL
37937	1998 GA_{9}	—	April 2, 1998	Socorro	LINEAR	MAR	2.8 km	MPC · JPL
37938	1998 GH_{9}	—	April 2, 1998	Socorro	LINEAR	·	3.5 km	MPC · JPL
37939 Hašler	1998 HA	Hašler	April 16, 1998	Ondřejov	L. Kotková	·	2.7 km	MPC · JPL
37940	1998 HA_{4}	—	April 19, 1998	Kitt Peak	Spacewatch	·	2.2 km	MPC · JPL
37941 Dawidowicz	1998 HS_{6}	Dawidowicz	April 22, 1998	Caussols	ODAS	·	3.4 km	MPC · JPL
37942	1998 HY_{8}	—	April 17, 1998	Kitt Peak	Spacewatch	·	2.4 km	MPC · JPL
37943	1998 HF_{18}	—	April 18, 1998	Socorro	LINEAR	·	2.2 km	MPC · JPL
37944	1998 HK_{19}	—	April 18, 1998	Socorro	LINEAR	·	3.6 km	MPC · JPL
37945	1998 HP_{19}	—	April 18, 1998	Socorro	LINEAR	·	3.2 km	MPC · JPL
37946	1998 HH_{20}	—	April 20, 1998	Socorro	LINEAR	PHO	1.9 km	MPC · JPL
37947	1998 HJ_{20}	—	April 20, 1998	Socorro	LINEAR	·	3.0 km	MPC · JPL
37948	1998 HN_{23}	—	April 25, 1998	Haleakala	NEAT	·	4.1 km	MPC · JPL
37949	1998 HD_{29}	—	April 20, 1998	Socorro	LINEAR	·	3.8 km	MPC · JPL
37950	1998 HU_{33}	—	April 20, 1998	Socorro	LINEAR	·	3.0 km	MPC · JPL
37951	1998 HE_{42}	—	April 24, 1998	Kitt Peak	Spacewatch	(5)	3.1 km	MPC · JPL
37952	1998 HW_{45}	—	April 20, 1998	Socorro	LINEAR	·	2.3 km	MPC · JPL
37953	1998 HX_{46}	—	April 20, 1998	Socorro	LINEAR	·	4.0 km	MPC · JPL
37954	1998 HF_{47}	—	April 20, 1998	Socorro	LINEAR	·	6.3 km	MPC · JPL
37955	1998 HK_{50}	—	April 29, 1998	Kitt Peak	Spacewatch	·	4.7 km	MPC · JPL
37956	1998 HO_{53}	—	April 21, 1998	Socorro	LINEAR	·	1.9 km	MPC · JPL
37957	1998 HJ_{54}	—	April 21, 1998	Socorro	LINEAR	GEF	3.6 km	MPC · JPL
37958	1998 HR_{57}	—	April 21, 1998	Socorro	LINEAR	(5)	2.3 km	MPC · JPL
37959	1998 HM_{62}	—	April 21, 1998	Socorro	LINEAR	·	4.5 km	MPC · JPL
37960	1998 HP_{64}	—	April 21, 1998	Socorro	LINEAR	·	4.0 km	MPC · JPL
37961	1998 HG_{71}	—	April 21, 1998	Socorro	LINEAR	·	3.9 km	MPC · JPL
37962	1998 HW_{74}	—	April 21, 1998	Socorro	LINEAR	·	2.9 km	MPC · JPL
37963	1998 HF_{79}	—	April 21, 1998	Socorro	LINEAR	·	4.4 km	MPC · JPL
37964	1998 HR_{84}	—	April 21, 1998	Socorro	LINEAR	MAR	4.1 km	MPC · JPL
37965	1998 HH_{89}	—	April 21, 1998	Socorro	LINEAR	·	4.6 km	MPC · JPL
37966	1998 HO_{90}	—	April 21, 1998	Socorro	LINEAR	·	12 km	MPC · JPL
37967	1998 HG_{93}	—	April 21, 1998	Socorro	LINEAR	·	3.7 km	MPC · JPL
37968	1998 HB_{94}	—	April 21, 1998	Socorro	LINEAR	EUN	5.4 km	MPC · JPL
37969	1998 HW_{97}	—	April 21, 1998	Socorro	LINEAR	·	2.8 km	MPC · JPL
37970	1998 HG_{100}	—	April 21, 1998	Socorro	LINEAR	EUN	5.6 km	MPC · JPL
37971	1998 HS_{102}	—	April 25, 1998	La Silla	E. W. Elst	·	6.3 km	MPC · JPL
37972	1998 HJ_{105}	—	April 23, 1998	Socorro	LINEAR	·	2.6 km	MPC · JPL
37973	1998 HG_{106}	—	April 23, 1998	Socorro	LINEAR	GEF	4.8 km	MPC · JPL
37974	1998 HE_{115}	—	April 23, 1998	Socorro	LINEAR	·	5.1 km	MPC · JPL
37975	1998 HB_{118}	—	April 23, 1998	Socorro	LINEAR	·	5.5 km	MPC · JPL
37976	1998 HC_{118}	—	April 23, 1998	Socorro	LINEAR	·	4.5 km	MPC · JPL
37977	1998 HC_{123}	—	April 23, 1998	Socorro	LINEAR	slow	15 km	MPC · JPL
37978	1998 HR_{124}	—	April 23, 1998	Socorro	LINEAR	·	11 km	MPC · JPL
37979	1998 HG_{125}	—	April 23, 1998	Socorro	LINEAR	·	4.5 km	MPC · JPL
37980	1998 HH_{126}	—	April 23, 1998	Socorro	LINEAR	EUN	3.2 km	MPC · JPL
37981	1998 HD_{130}	—	April 19, 1998	Socorro	LINEAR	·	3.6 km	MPC · JPL
37982	1998 HB_{132}	—	April 19, 1998	Socorro	LINEAR	·	3.2 km	MPC · JPL
37983	1998 HB_{136}	—	April 20, 1998	Socorro	LINEAR	·	4.0 km	MPC · JPL
37984	1998 HA_{138}	—	April 20, 1998	Socorro	LINEAR	GEF · slow	3.6 km	MPC · JPL
37985	1998 HF_{144}	—	April 21, 1998	Socorro	LINEAR	·	5.0 km	MPC · JPL
37986	1998 HQ_{144}	—	April 21, 1998	Socorro	LINEAR	JUN	2.3 km	MPC · JPL
37987	1998 HO_{145}	—	April 21, 1998	Socorro	LINEAR	·	2.2 km	MPC · JPL
37988	1998 HB_{153}	—	April 23, 1998	Haleakala	NEAT	·	2.8 km	MPC · JPL
37989	1998 HZ_{153}	—	April 28, 1998	Kitt Peak	Spacewatch	·	6.4 km	MPC · JPL
37990	1998 KN_{4}	—	May 22, 1998	Anderson Mesa	LONEOS	·	3.6 km	MPC · JPL
37991	1998 KZ_{5}	—	May 24, 1998	Kitt Peak	Spacewatch	2:1J	7.0 km	MPC · JPL
37992	1998 KP_{6}	—	May 22, 1998	Anderson Mesa	LONEOS	·	5.0 km	MPC · JPL
37993	1998 KM_{8}	—	May 23, 1998	Anderson Mesa	LONEOS	·	6.6 km	MPC · JPL
37994	1998 KV_{12}	—	May 22, 1998	Socorro	LINEAR	EUN	4.7 km	MPC · JPL
37995	1998 KG_{24}	—	May 22, 1998	Socorro	LINEAR	·	5.3 km	MPC · JPL
37996	1998 KE_{27}	—	May 22, 1998	Socorro	LINEAR	·	4.2 km	MPC · JPL
37997	1998 KW_{30}	—	May 22, 1998	Socorro	LINEAR	·	4.9 km	MPC · JPL
37998	1998 KF_{34}	—	May 22, 1998	Socorro	LINEAR	·	2.7 km	MPC · JPL
37999	1998 KL_{34}	—	May 22, 1998	Socorro	LINEAR	·	5.8 km	MPC · JPL
38000	1998 KK_{35}	—	May 22, 1998	Socorro	LINEAR	TEL	5.4 km	MPC · JPL

back to top

== See also ==
- Meanings of minor-planet names: 37001–38000
