= Meanings of minor-planet names: 37001–38000 =

As minor planet discoveries are confirmed, they are given a permanent number by the IAU's Minor Planet Center (MPC), and the discoverers can then submit names for them, following the IAU's naming conventions. The list below concerns those minor planets in the specified number-range that have received names, and explains the meanings of those names.

Official naming citations of newly named small Solar System bodies are approved and published in a bulletin by IAU's Working Group for Small Bodies Nomenclature (WGSBN). Before May 2021, citations were published in MPC's Minor Planet Circulars for many decades. Recent citations can also be found on the JPL Small-Body Database (SBDB). Until his death in 2016, German astronomer Lutz D. Schmadel compiled these citations into the Dictionary of Minor Planet Names (DMP) and regularly updated the collection.

Based on Paul Herget's The Names of the Minor Planets, Schmadel also researched the unclear origin of numerous asteroids, most of which had been named prior to World War II. This article incorporates text from this source, which is in the public domain: SBDB New namings may only be added to this list below after official publication as the preannouncement of names is condemned. The WGSBN publishes a comprehensive guideline for the naming rules of non-cometary small Solar System bodies.

== 37001–37100 ==
Named minor planet	Provisional	This minor planet was named for...	Ref · Catalog
37019 Jordansteckloff	2000 TA_{61}	Jordan Steckloff (born 1985) is a research scientist at the Planetary Science Institute who conducts modeling investigations into the physical processes at work on a variety of solar system bodies.	IAU · 37019
37022 Robertovittori	2000 UT_{1}	Roberto Vittori (born 1964), Italian astronaut	MPC · 37022
37044 Papymarcel	2000 UE_{29}	Marcel Alphonse Merlin, father of French discoverer Jean-Claude Merlin. "Papy" is the French diminutive of "Father".	JPL · 37044

== 37101–37200 ==
back to top

Named minor planet	Provisional	This minor planet was named for...	Ref · Catalog
37117 Narcissus	2000 VU_{2}	Narcissus, from Greek mythology, a hero from the territory of Thespiae in Boeotia who was renowned for his beauty	JPL · 37117
37139 Richardmuller	2000 VH_{38}	Richard A. Muller (b. 1944), American physicist and emeritus professor at UC Berkeley.	IAU · 37139
37141 Povolný	2000 VZ_{38}	Dalibor Povolný (1924–2004), a Czech biologist and expert on butterflies and flies	MPC · 37141
37154 Chuckfeeney	2000 VZ_{58}	Chuck Feeney, Irish-American businessman and philanthropist.	IAU · 37154
37159 Margaretmead	2000 WX	Margaret Mead, American cultural anthropologist.	IAU · 37159
37163 Huachucaclub	2000 WD_{11}	The Huachuca Astronomy Club of Sierra Vista, Arizona, counts many amateur astronomers, including several discoverers of minor planets and comets as well as authors of books, articles and software (Src).	MPC · 37163

== 37201–37300 ==
back to top

Named minor planet	Provisional	This minor planet was named for...	Ref · Catalog
37218 Kimyoonyoung	2000 WE_{137}	Yoonyoung Kim (born 1991) is a Korean postdoctoral researcher at the Max Planck Institute for Solar System Research (Göttingen, Germany), whose studies include characterization of dust properties of active asteroids and comets.	IAU · 37218
37222 Sansom	2000 WB_{142}	Eleanor Sansom (b. 1990), a British/Australian planetary scientist.	IAU · 37222
37223 Devillepoix	2000 WD_{142}	Hadrien Devillepoix (b. 1990), an Australian astronomer.	IAU · 37223
37250 Juliemitchell	2000 WX_{183}	Julie Mitchell (b. 1984) is an American planetary scientist who served as NASA ARTEMIS mission curator during the difficult period of early cold-sample technology development, and played a central role in developing cold sample return techniques for cometary sample return missions.	IAU · 37250
37279 Hukvaldy	2000 YK_{12}	Hrad Hukvaldy, a large castle in northeastern Moravia, Czech Republic (Src).	MPC · 37279

== 37301–37400 ==
back to top

Named minor planet	Provisional	This minor planet was named for...	Ref · Catalog
37309 Pajuelo	2001 OX_{62}	Myriam Pajuelo (born 1961) is one of the first Peruvian planetary scientists. She obtained her PhD in France on studies of binary asteroids, and returned to Peru in 2017 to promote research in Planetary Sciences at the PUC-Peru.	IAU · 37309
37313 Paolocampaner	2001 QC	Paolo Campaner (1952–2022), an Italian amateur astronomer.	IAU · 37313
37349 Lynnaequick	2001 SV_{291}	Lynnae C. Quick (born 1984) is an American planetary scientist and expert in volcanic processes on planetary bodies, including study of the faculae and cryovolcanism on (1) Ceres. She is member of the Dawn, Europa Clipper, and Dragonfly mission teams.	IAU · 37349; IAU
37391 Ebre	2001 XB	Ebre Observatory (Observatori de l'Ebre) in Roquetes-Tortosa, Spain. The observatory takes its name from a nearby river and was founded by the Jesuits in 1904. Since its establishment it has become very prestigious in geophysics. The observatory's centennial is being celebrated in 2004.	MPC · 37391
37392 Yukiniall	2001 XP_{16}	Yuki and Niall, children of co-discoverer Henri Boffin	JPL · 37392

== 37401–37500 ==
back to top

Named minor planet	Provisional	This minor planet was named for...	Ref · Catalog
37432 Piszkéstető	2002 AE_{11}	Piszkéstető, a 944 m peak on Mátra Mountains, Hungary, site of Piszkéstető Station	JPL · 37432
37452 Spirit	4282 P-L	Spirit rover (Mars Exploration Rover A)†	MPC · 37452
37471 Popocatépetl	7082 P-L	Popocatépetl, the 5452-m volcano in Mexico.	JPL · 37471

== 37501–37600 ==
back to top

Named minor planet	Provisional	This minor planet was named for...	Ref · Catalog
37519 Amphios	3040 T-3	Amphios, son of Merops of Perkote, one of the allies of Priam, killed by Ajax to get his beautiful armour during the Trojan war	JPL · 37519
37529 Ama-Miyayama	1977 EL_{8}	The Ama-Miyayama tomb is located in Takatsuki City, Osaka Prefecture, Japan.	JPL · 37529
37530 Dancingangel	1977 RP_{7}	Ekaterina Pavlova (1991–2010), a talented and bright individual who devoted her short life to oriental dance. A two-time champion of oriental dancing in the Republic of Crimea, she also won numerous other competitions. The name "Dancingangel" reflects her spiritual qualities and professionalism.	JPL · 37530
37556 Svyaztie	1982 QP_{3}	Svyaz and Tie, Russian and English words meaning "connection", honouring the astronomical collaborations and friendships between the two superpowers, and also the exchange of neckwear by the co-discoverers on their first meeting in 1970	JPL · 37556
37561 Churgym	1988 CR	Churgym River, a small Siberian river which forms a waterfall close to the site of the 1908 Tunguska event, which destroyed a large area of the taiga forest.	JPL · 37561
37565 Hinoki	1988 VL_{3}	Rikako Hinoki, Japanese amateur astronomer.	IAU · 37565
37573 Enricocaruso	1989 UB_{7}	Enrico Caruso (1873–1921), Italian tenor	JPL · 37573
37582 Faraday	1990 TT_{3}	Michael Faraday (1791–1867), English naturalist, discoverer, amongst many things, of electromagnetic induction, diamagnetism, and the Faraday effect	JPL · 37582
37583 Ramonkhanna	1990 TH_{8}	Ramon Khanna (born 1964), a German astrophysicist whose research includes black-hole magnetohydrodynamics	JPL · 37583
37584 Schleiden	1990 TC_{9}	Matthias Jakob Schleiden (1804–1881), German botanist, co-founder (with Theodor Schwann) of the field of cytology	JPL · 37584
37586 Isakaayumi	1991 BP_{2}	Ayumi Isaka, commentator at the Chihaya Stars and Nature Museum in Chihaya Village, Osaka.	IAU · 37586
37588 Lynnecox	1991 GA_{2}	Lynne Cox (born 1957), American long-distance swimmer	JPL · 37588
37592 Pauljackson	1991 TG_{7}	Paul Jackson (born 1932), Professor emeritus at the Vienna Observatory	JPL · 37592
37596 Cotahuasi	1991 VV_{6}	The Cotahuasi Canyon, near the Peruvian city of Arequipa, was formed by the Cotahuasi river.	JPL · 37596

== 37601–37700 ==
back to top

Named minor planet	Provisional	This minor planet was named for...	Ref · Catalog
37601 Vicjen	1992 GC_{1}	Vic Winter (born 1953) and Jen Winter (born 1969), popularizers of astronomy in rural Bolivia	JPL · 37601
37607 Regineolsen	1992 RO_{7}	Regine Olsen (1822–1904), a Danish woman who was engaged to the Danish philosopher Søren Kierkegaard and who had a great influence upon his works.	JPL · 37607
37608 Löns	1992 SY_{16}	Hermann Löns (1866–1914), German novelist and folk songwriter	JPL · 37608
37609 LaVelle	1992 WS_{4}	Lewis LaVelle McCoy (born 1946), an American civic-minded entrepreneur from Arizona.	JPL · 37609
37623 Valmiera	1993 RN_{4}	Valmiera (Wolmar), city in Northern Latvia	JPL · 37623
37625 Yonezawatatsuki	1993 SR_{1}	Tatsuki Yonezawa, Japanese amateur astronomer and curator at the Misato Observatory in Kimino, Wakayama Prefecture.	IAU · 37625
37626 Meizen	1993 SG_{2}	Meizen High School, a Fukuoka prefectural high school.	IAU · 37626
37627 Lucaparmitano	1993 TD	Luca Parmitano (born 1976) is an Italian engineer and astronaut in the European Astronaut Corps for the European Space Agency.	JPL · 37627
37630 Thomasmore	1993 TM_{20}	Thomas More (1478–1535), a philosopher, statesman and a noted Renaissance humanist.	JPL · 37630
37640 Luiginegrelli	1993 WF	Luigi Negrelli (1799–1858) was an Italian engineer, known for his work on the Suez Canal.	JPL · 37640
37645 Chebarkul	1994 CM_{13}	The city of Chebarkul where a large fragment the Chelyabinsk meteor penetrated the surface of Lake Chebarkul, creating an 8-meter diameter hole on 15 February 2013	JPL · 37645
37646 Falconscott	1994 CS_{13}	Robert Falcon Scott (1868–1912) was the first British explorer to reach the South Pole and explore Antarctica extensively by land.	JPL · 37646
37655 Illapa	1994 PM	Illapa, the thunder or weather god of the Incas	JPL · 37655
37669 Haragentaro	1994 TH_{1}	Gentaro Hara, Japanese amateur astronomer.	IAU · 37669
37678 McClure	1995 CR_{1}	Albert Edmund McClure (born 1938), Irish engineer and antique astronomical instrument restorer	JPL · 37678
37683 Gustaveeiffel	1995 KK	Gustave Eiffel (1832–1923) was a French civil engineer and architect. He is best known for the Eiffel Tower, built for the 1889 Universal Exposition in Paris.	JPL · 37683
37687 Chunghikoh	1995 QB_{10}	Chunghi Koh (Helen) Weber, American pharmacist and wife of American astronomer Robert Weber, who is credited with the discovery of this minor planet.	JPL · 37687
37692 Loribragg	1995 VX	Lori Bragg, American member of the Maui Economic Development Board, provider of technical support to the AMOS team	JPL · 37692
37693 Utofumiaki	1995 VQ_{1}	Fumiaki Uto, Japanese amateur astronomer.	IAU · 37693
37699 Santini-Aichl	1996 AH_{1}	Jan Santini Aichel (1677–1723), a Czech architect of Italian origin	JPL · 37699

== 37701–37800 ==
back to top

Named minor planet	Provisional	This minor planet was named for...	Ref · Catalog
37706 Trinchieri	1996 RN	Ginevra Trinchieri (born 1955) has worked on galaxies, groups, clusters and their evolution, particularly on their high energy properties. She is currently the president of the Italian Astronomical Society and the Italian representative and outreach contact in the IAU.	JPL · 37706
37720 Kawanishi	1996 SH_{7}	Kawanishi is situated in the southern part of Yamagata Prefecture, Japan.	JPL · 37720
37729 Akiratakao	1996 TK_{54}	Akira Takao (born 1952), Japanese neurological physician and amateur astronomer (nova hunter)	JPL · 37729
37734 Bonacina	1996 UR_{3}	Celestino Bonacina (born 1947), an Italian amateur astronomer instrumental for the construction of the Sormano Astronomical Observatory where this minor planet was discovered.	IAU · 37734
37735 Riccardomuti	1996 VL	Riccardo Muti (born 1941) is an Italian conductor. He holds three music directorships: the Chicago Symphony Orchestra; the Philadelphia Orchestra; and the Teatro alla Scala in Milan. Muti has been a prolific recording artist and has received dozens of honors, titles, awards and prizes.	JPL · 37735
37736 Jandl	1996 VU_{6}	Ivan Jandl (1937–1987), a Czech child actor and first Czech Oscar winner	JPL · 37736
37749 Umbertobonori	1997 AG_{18}	Umberto Bonori (born 1950) is an Italian amateur astronomer, who has been at the T.L.C. Observatory since its 1991 foundation.	JPL · 37749
37764 Omirika	1997 GT_{3}	Rika Omi, Japanese pianist, singer-songwriter, and amateur astronomer.	IAU · 37764
37777 Pérez-Reverte	1997 GE_{32}	Description available (see ref). Please summarize in your own words.	IAU · 37777
37782 Jacquespiccard	1997 JP_{11}	Jacques Piccard (1922–2008), a Swiss marine explorer best known for his historic submarine dive to the floor of the Mariana Trench.	JPL · 37782
37785 Nougaro	1997 SL_{15}	Claude Nougaro (1929–2004) was a French songwriter, singer and poet. Fond of jazz music, he wrote French lyrics and put American jazz standards and Brazilian themes into his songs.	IAU · 37785
37786 Tokikonaruko	1997 SS_{17}	Tokiko Naruko, Japanese social volunteer, daughter of Issei Yamamoto, founder of the Oriental Astronomical Association	JPL · 37786
37788 Suchan	1997 SK_{34}	Pavel Suchan, Czech popularizer of astronomy at the Stefanik Observatory in Prague and spokesman for the Czech Astronomical Society.	MPC · 37788

== 37801–37900 ==
back to top

Named minor planet	Provisional	This minor planet was named for...	Ref · Catalog
37818 Juliamaury	1998 BC_{5}	Julia Maury (born 2019) is the daughter of (29634) Sabrinaaksil and (8184) Luderic, who is the son of (3780) Maury and (4404) Enirac.	IAU · 37818
37835 Darioconsigli	1998 BC_{44}	Dario Consigli (born 1992), an Italian school teacher and nephew of amateur astronomer Maura Tombelli, who discovered this minor planet.	IAU · 37835
37836 Simoneterreni	1998 BD_{44}	Simone Terreni (born 1972) is an Italian amateur astronomer and a member of the astronomy club at Montelupo (Italian: Gruppo Astrofili Montelupo) who is a computer engineer and telecommunications entrepreneur by profession.	IAU · 37836
37840 Gramegna	1998 DA_{3}	Maria Gramegna (1887–1915) was an Italian mathematician who studied linear differential equations. The techniques in his thesis, now lost, were highly original. She taught mathematics in Avezzano, and was one of 30000 people killed during the 1915 January 13 earthquake.	JPL · 37840
37848 Michelmeunier	1998 DB_{14}	Michel Meunier (born 1964), a French airline pilot, amateur astronomer, and developer of electronic systems for astronomy, as well as a discoverer of minor planets and comets such as C/1997 J2 (Meunier–Dupouy) using a remote telescope in Chile.	IAU · 37848
37853 Danielbarbier	1998 DB_{35}	Daniel Barbier (1907–1965), a French observational astronomer, made significant contributions to the study of the background of the night sky. He turned his interest to the 6300 Å forbidden line of neutral oxygen by measuring the variations of its strength with the height in the ionosphere where it is emitted.	JPL · 37853
37859 Bobkoff	1998 FE_{3}	Robert Koff (born 1943), an American amateur astronomer who has produced numerous high-quality lightcurves for minor planets and eclipsing binary stars, despite shooting through the urban skies of Denver, CO, and around trees and houses from his apartment balcony. His work is a testament to perseverance, dedication and the power of CCD imaging (Src).	JPL · 37859
37865 Georgesattard	1998 FS_{15}	Georges Attard (born 1957) is a French computer scientist and program manager in the aerospace industry. He has developed a number of image processing algorithms and has contributed to digital mapping and satellite imagery software.	IAU · 37865

== 37901–38000 ==
back to top

Named minor planet	Provisional	This minor planet was named for...	Ref · Catalog
37939 Hašler	1998 HA	Karel Hašler (1879–1941), Czech songwriter, actor, movie director and cabaretier	MPC · 37939
37941 Dawidowicz	1998 HS_{6}	Gilles Dawidowicz (born 1971), a French geographer and co-writer on planetology text books, who has been the vice-president of the Société astronomique de France as well as the president of the Triel Observatory (French: Observatoire de Triel, Src).	IAU · 37941

back to top

Preceded by 36,001–37,000	Meanings of minor-planet names List of minor planets: 37,001–38,000	Succeeded by 38,001–39,000
