= Vilʹev (crater) =

Crater on the Moon

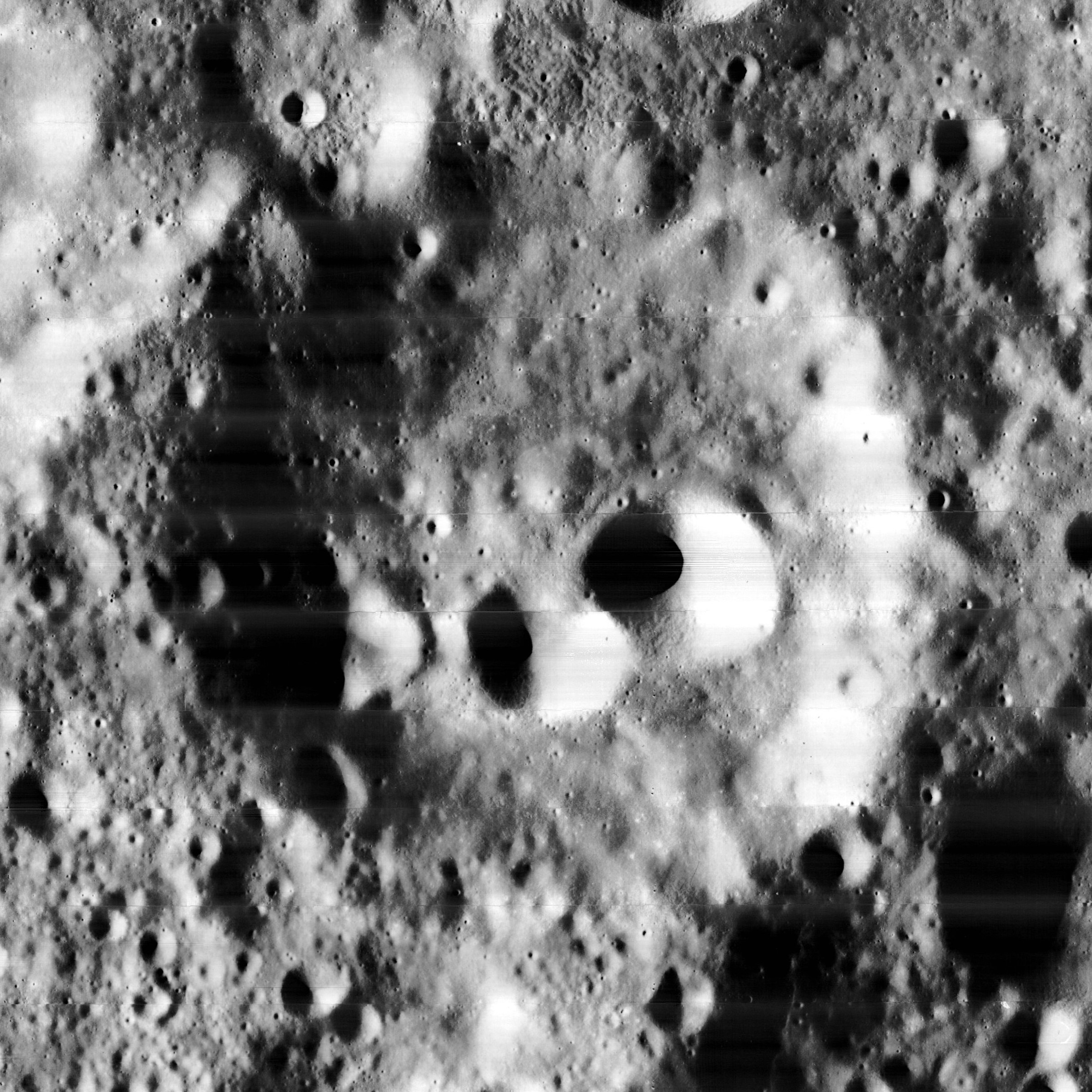
- Lunar Orbiter 1 image
- Coordinates: 6.1°S 144.4°E
- Diameter: 45 km
- Depth: Unknown
- Colongitude: 220° at sunrise
- Eponym: Mikhail A. Vilʹev

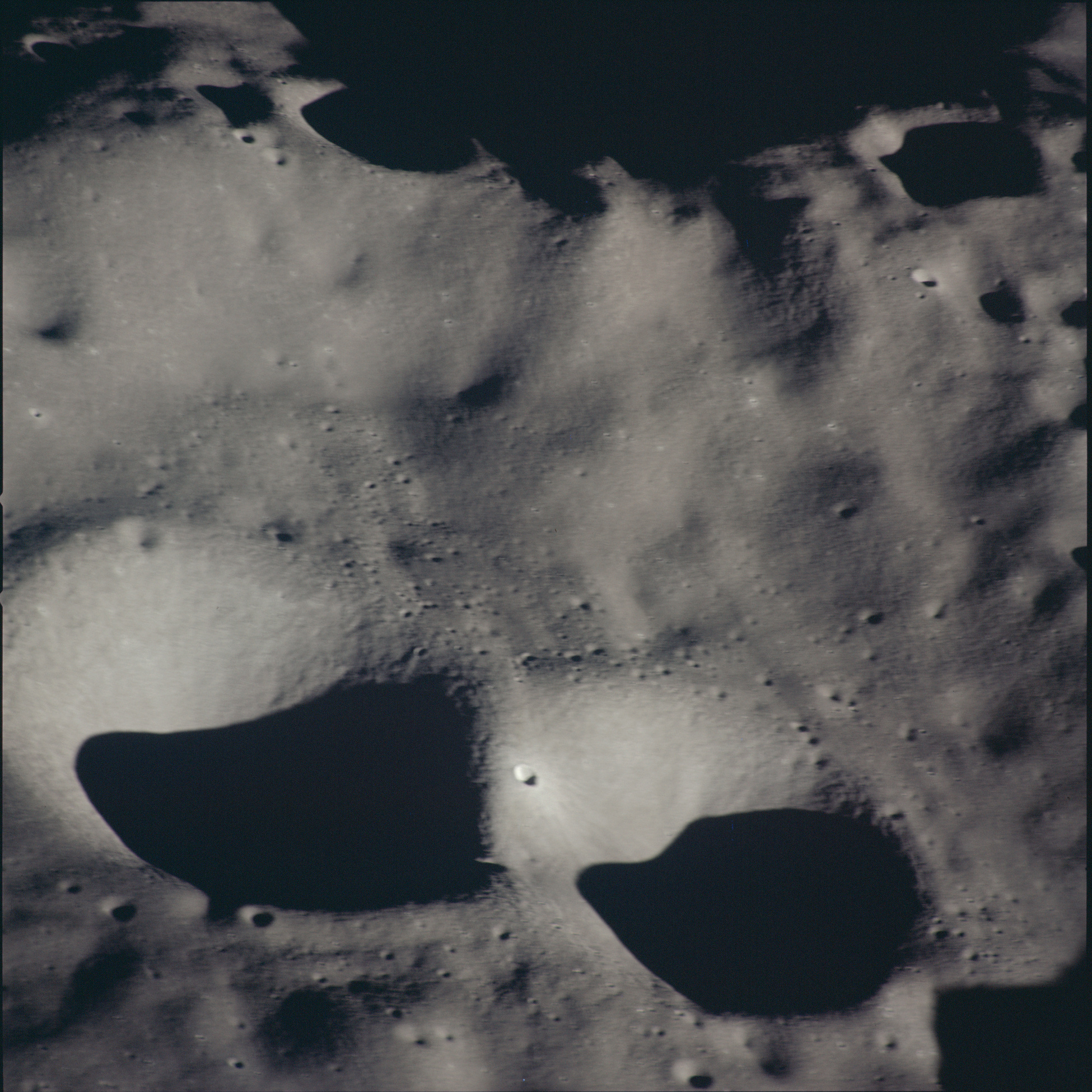
Oblique Apollo 14 image of interior, facing south

Vilʹev is an eroded lunar impact crater that is located on the far side of the Moon. It lies to the west of the much larger crater Chaplygin, and to the north of Marconi. Just to the northeast of Vilʹev is the small crater pair of van den Bos and Tamm. Slightly farther to the west is the larger crater pair of Pannekoek and Dellinger.

Vilʹev is significantly eroded, and the outer rim now forms a somewhat irregular ring of ridges about the interior floor. Near the center of the crater is a pair of smaller, cup-shaped impacts that are joined along their outer rims. There is another small crater along the inner wall to the west-southwest.

== Satellite craters ==
By convention these features are identified on lunar maps by placing the letter on the side of the crater midpoint that is closest to Vilʹev.

Vilʹev	Latitude	Longitude	Diameter
B	4.5° S	144.7° E	13 km
J	6.6° S	145.3° E	17 km
V	5.3° S	142.9° E	44 km
