= Tillinger =

Tillinger is a surname. Notable people with the surname include:

- Emma Tillinger Koskoff (born 1972), American film producer
- John Tillinger (born 1938), American theatre director and actor

== See also ==
- Dillinger (surname)
- Hillinger
