= Van den Bos (crater) =

Crater on the Moon

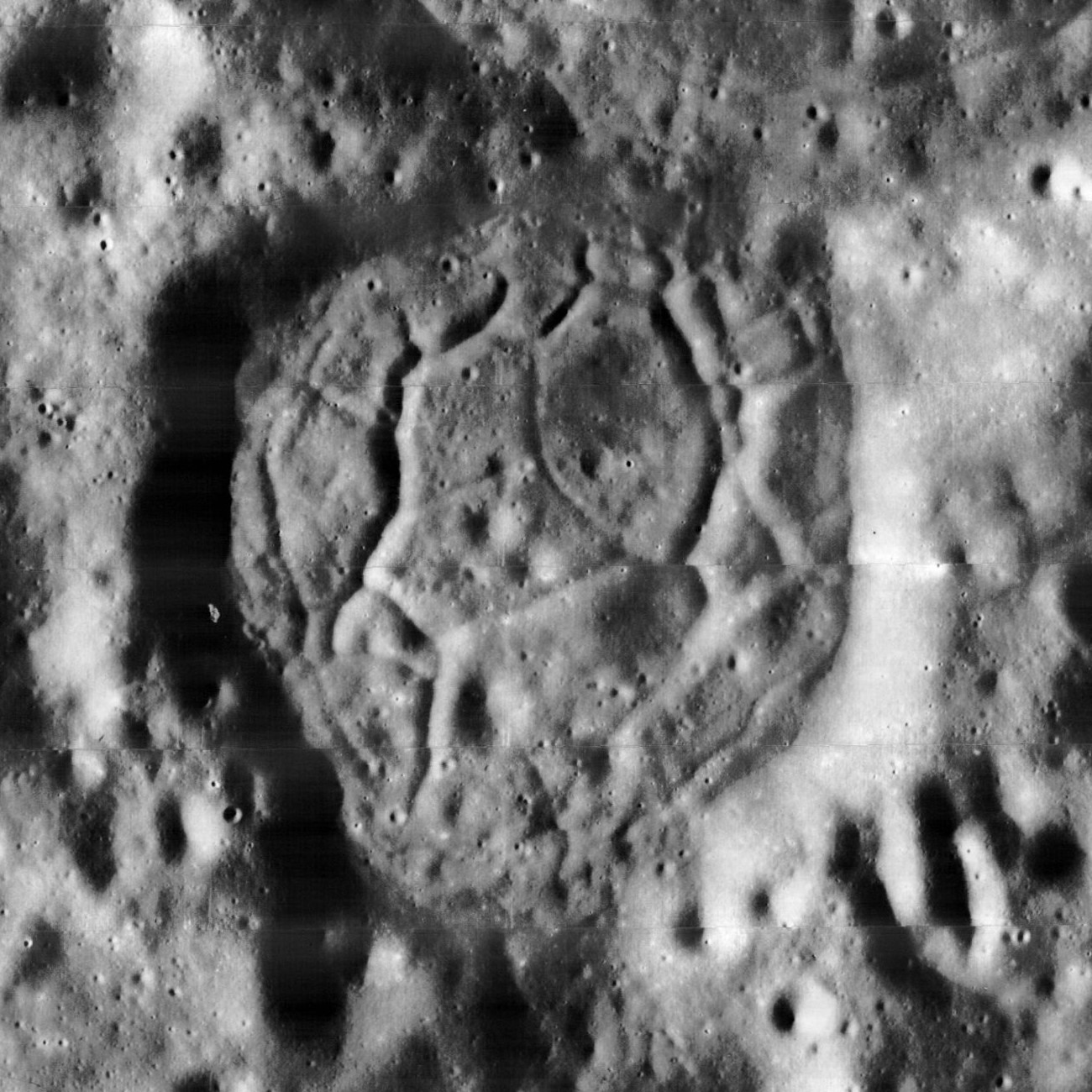
- Lunar Orbiter 1 image
- Coordinates: 5.3°S 146.0°E
- Diameter: 22 km
- Depth: Unknown
- Colongitude: 214° at sunrise
- Eponym: Willem H. van den Bos

Van den Bos is a small lunar impact crater that is joined to the south-southwestern outer rim of the slightly larger crater Tamm. About one crater diameter to the west is Vil'ev. Farther away to the east is the prominent Chaplygin, and to the south-southwest lies Marconi. van den Bos is located on the far side of the Moon and cannot be viewed directly from the Earth.

This is a shallow crater formation with some wear along its rim. It has nearly merged with the neighboring Tamm, and the length of the common rim is almost two-thirds the diameter of van den Bos. The interior floor has a series of rilles across the surface. These are usually formed by cooling sheets of basaltic lava, although it has been hypothesized that the fissured, viscous-appearing material within both Tamm and van den Bos was emplaced as impact melt from the Mendeleev basin 225 km to the northwest.

== Views ==
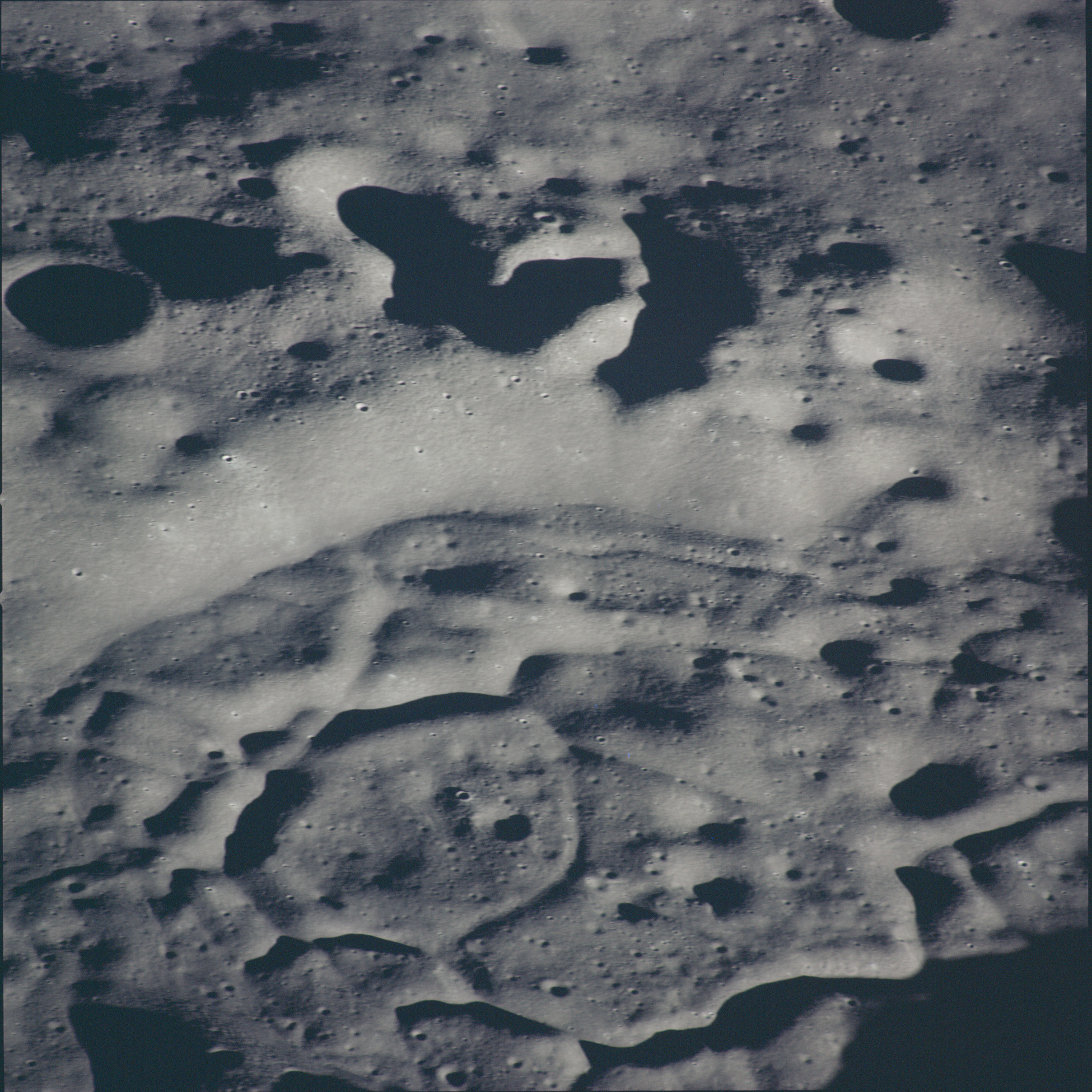
Oblique view facing southeast from Apollo 14

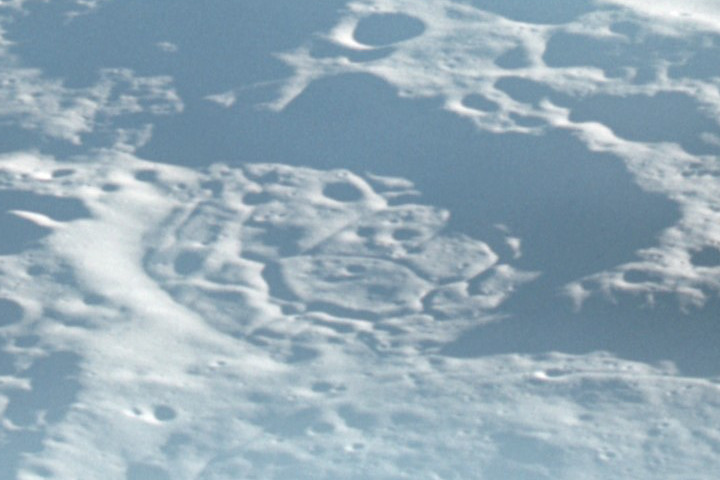
Oblique view facing south from Apollo 12

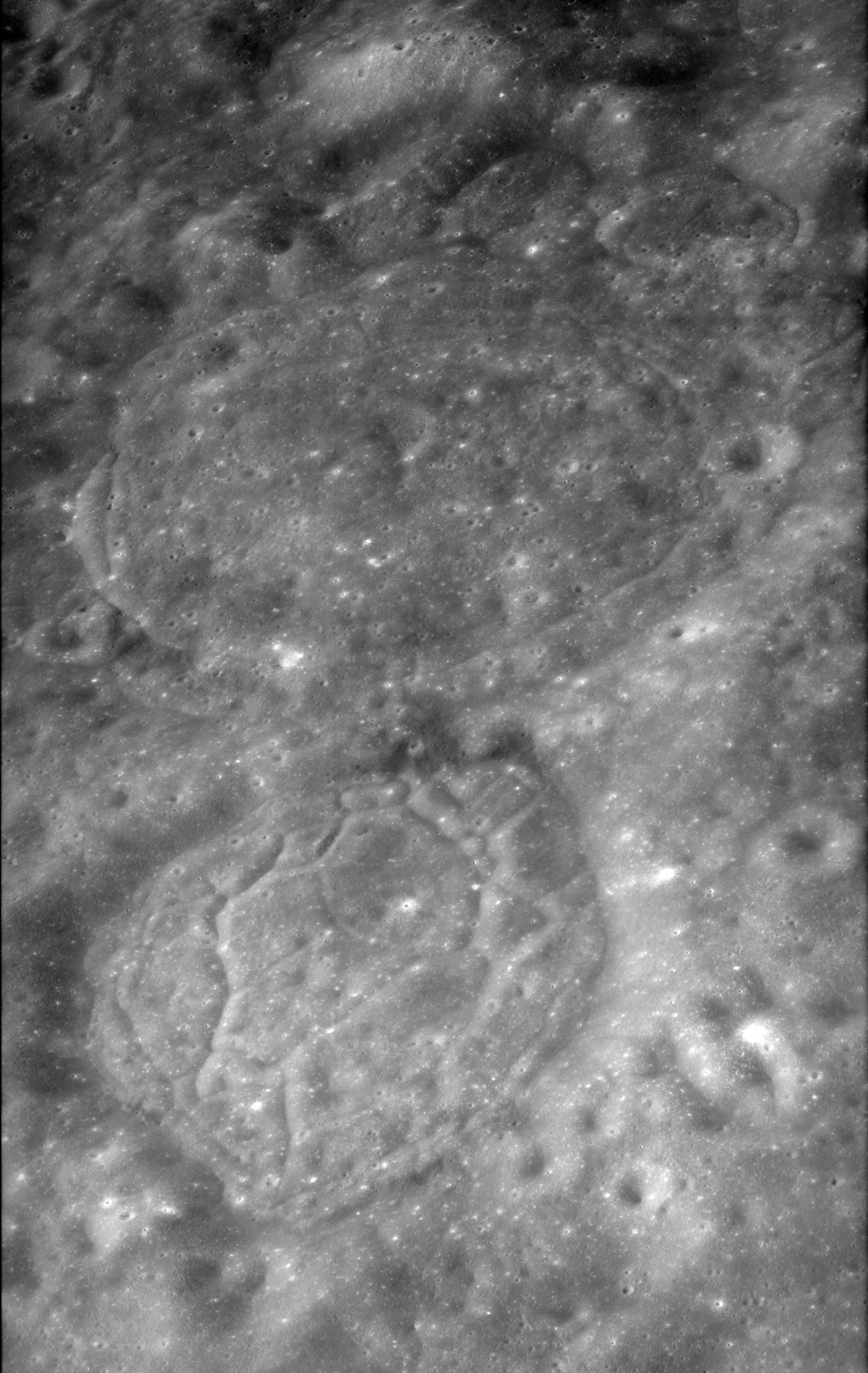
Oblique Apollo 17 panoramic camera image facing north with van den Bos below center and Tamm above center
