= Don Cesar (Dellinger) =

German-language comic operetta

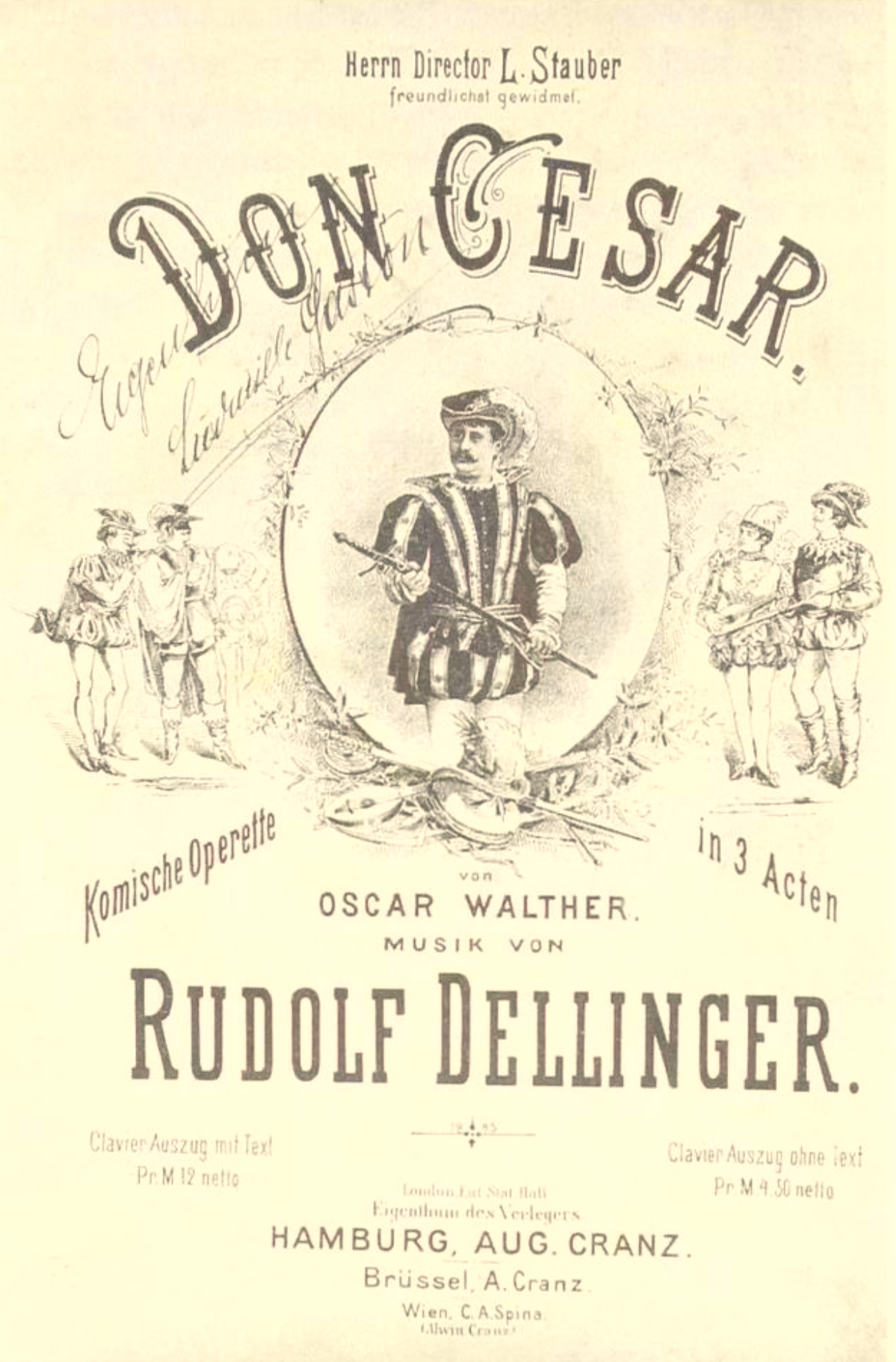
1885 poster

Don Cesar is a German-language comic operetta in three acts with music by Rudolf Dellinger. Its libretto by Oskar Walther was adapted from the 1844 play by Adolphe d'Ennery and Dumanoir which was also the basis for the operas Don César de Bazan by Jules Massenet and Maritana by William Vincent Wallace among several other 19th century stage works. The work was celebrated not only in Germany but on the international stage, and according to theatre scholar Kurt Gänzl was "one of the most widely played pieces of its time, and certainly the most successful of all 19th century German operettas".

== History ==
According to music scholar Andrew Lamb, Dellinger's music for Don Cesar demonstrates clear influence from Jacques Offenbach's La Périchole; an assessment also shared by Gänzl. However, Lamb also indicates that the score owed much to "Spanish-influenced melodies" which made it unique among German-language operetta and a successful rival to the Viennese operetta that dominated the repertoire of the day.

The opera premiered at the Carl Schultze Theater in Hamburg, Germany on 28 March 1885. It was subsequently performed in a much lauded production at the Walhalla-Theater in Berlin where it opened on 23 September 1885.

== Roles ==
- König
- Königin
- Fernandez de Mirabillas
- Ranudo Onofrio de Colibrados
- Uraca
- Cesar
- Pueblo Escudero
- Sancho
- Juan
- Pedro
- José
- Manuel
- Federigo
- Laurenzo
- Eugenio
- Maritana
- Martinez
- Alerta
- Anita

== Synopsis ==
Time and places: The operetta takes place in and near Madrid (Spain) at the time of its premiere, that is, in the 1880s.

=== Act I ===
The carnival festivities in Madrid always offer the King a welcome opportunity to mingle with the people in disguise and look for a beautiful girl. Today, the spirited Maritana caught his eye. While she enjoys his declarations of love, she makes it clear that she would only fully surrender to him if she became his wife. The minister Fernandez, loyal to the king, recommends to his lord that he marry the beautiful woman to a stooge, whose identity should be kept secret; afterwards, he can indulge his desires undisturbed. He has chosen the impoverished Count Don Cesar, who has just returned from a long journey to his homeland. The Count feels honored to be able to win such a charming woman so easily. While he is already looking forward to the wedding, he meets Pueblo, the Queen's page, who is just about to serenade his beloved with a few friends. Don Cesar supports the singers with his powerful voice. However, this attracts the attention of the police, who promptly arrest the young men for disturbing the peace.

=== Act II ===
Because Don Cesar slightly injured an officer during his arrest, he was sentenced to death by a summary court. He awaits his execution in the dungeon. Unexpectedly, he receives a visit from Minister Fernandez who offers a deal: If he immediately marries an unknown woman, allowing her to adorn herself with the title "Countess," he will be spared from death by hanging. Instead, he would be honorably shot. Don Cesar agrees. After his face is covered with a mask, the deeply veiled Maritana is brought in. She believes she is now being married to the nobleman who swore his love to her yesterday. As soon as the couple has tied the knot, Maritana is led away again.

=== Act III ===
Don Cesar survived his death sentence because Pueblo managed to replace the bullets in the rifles with blanks. Together, they seek refuge in a castle near Madrid, where Maritana has also been taken. Here, Don Cesar encounters the king's obedient minister again. The minister cannot believe his eyes when he sees the supposedly dead man. When Don Cesar demands to be brought to his wife, Fernandez resorts to a trick: He shows him the unattractive Donna Uranca, the wife of the royal archivist. Under these circumstances, Don Cesar no longer wants to be married and flees again. Meanwhile, Pueblo reveals to Maritana what a shameful game has been played with her. It doesn't take long for Don Cesar to return to the royal pleasure palace, where he immediately runs into the King. Upon hearing the story of the unfortunate Count, the King is overcome with remorse. He personally ensures that the lawfully married couple can consummate their marriage. He even appoints the Count as the new Governor of Valencia.

== Notable arias ==
- O Jugendzeit
- Vom alten Stamm der letzte Zweig
- Maritana
- Ja, in Spanien ist es schwer Minister zu sein
- Komm herab, oh Madonna Theresa
- In Königs Namen, stehet still!
- Don Cesar von Irun
- Was ich ersehnt, was ich erträumt
- Der König kommt, er lebe hoch!

== Recordings ==
- Walther, Otto; Dellinger, Rudolf; Naxos Digital Services US (2015), Dellinger, R.: Don Cesar [Opera] (Grossmann, Farr, Schmidt, Gerhardt, Moser, Ernst Senff Choir, Berlin Studio Orchestra, Gaebel), Hong Kong: Naxos Digital Services US Inc, OCLC 919577721
