= Hillinger =

Hillinger may refer to:

- Carmen Hillinger, German Paralympic wheelchair fencer
- Charles Hillinger (1926–2008), American journalist
- Claude Hillinger (born 1930), German American economist
- Raymond Peter Hillinger (1904–1971), American prelate of the Roman Catholic Church
- Sean Hillinger, a fictional FBI analyst from the seventh season of 24
