= Rudolf Dellinger =

German composer (1857–1910)

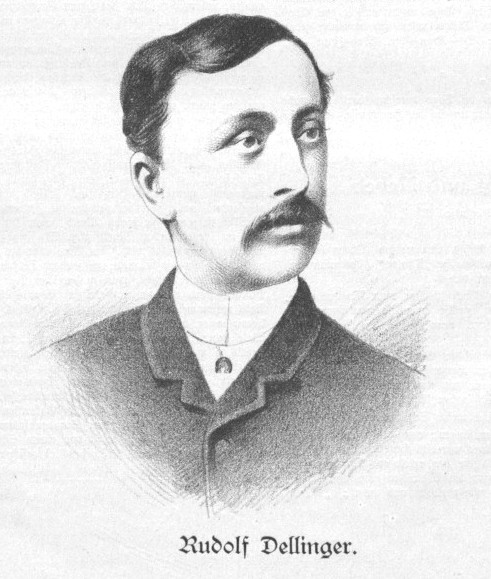
Rudolf Dellinger, pictured in 1890

Rudolf Dellinger (8 July 1857 – 24 September, 1910) was a German Bohemian composer and Kapellmeister. He almost exclusively composed operettas and was considered to be among the most outstanding composers of his time.

Born into a family of Bohemian of instrument makers in Graslitz, Dellinger received musical tuition early in life. He studied at the School of Music in Prague between 1874 and 1879, and later at the Prague Conservatory, where he was taught piano by, among others, Julius Pisarowitz.

After completing his musical education, he took a position as a clarinettist in Brno in 1880, then worked as a Kapellmeister in Passau, Eger, Prague and Salzburg. In 1883, Dellinger moved to Hamburg, where he worked at the Carl-Schultze-Theater. He wrote his first operettas there, which also premiered in Hamburg.

On 2 February 1886, Dellinger married Anna Maria Eppich, an Austrian singer.

In 1893, Dellinger was employed as Kapellmeister of the Residenztheater in Dresden, where he worked until his death at the age of 53.

== Works ==
Dellinger's oeuvre includes:

- 1885: Don Cesar – libretto by Otto Walther, adapted from Don César de Bazan by Philippe Dumanoir and Adolphe d'Ennery
- 1886: Lorraine – libretto by Oscar Walther
- 1889: Capitain Fracassa – libretto by F. Zell and Richard Genée after Th. Gautier
- 1891: Saint Cyr – libretto by Otto Walther after Alexandre Dumas Sr
- 1894: Die Chansonette – libretto by Victor Léon and H. v. Waldberg
- 1901: Jadwiga – libretto by Richard Pohl and P. Hirschberger, after Les diamants de la couronne by E. Scribe
- 1910: Der letzte Jonas (The last Jonas) – libretto by Richard Pohl and L. Ascher

== See also ==
- Dellinger (disambiguation)
