= Frida Felser =

German opera singer and actress (1872–1941)

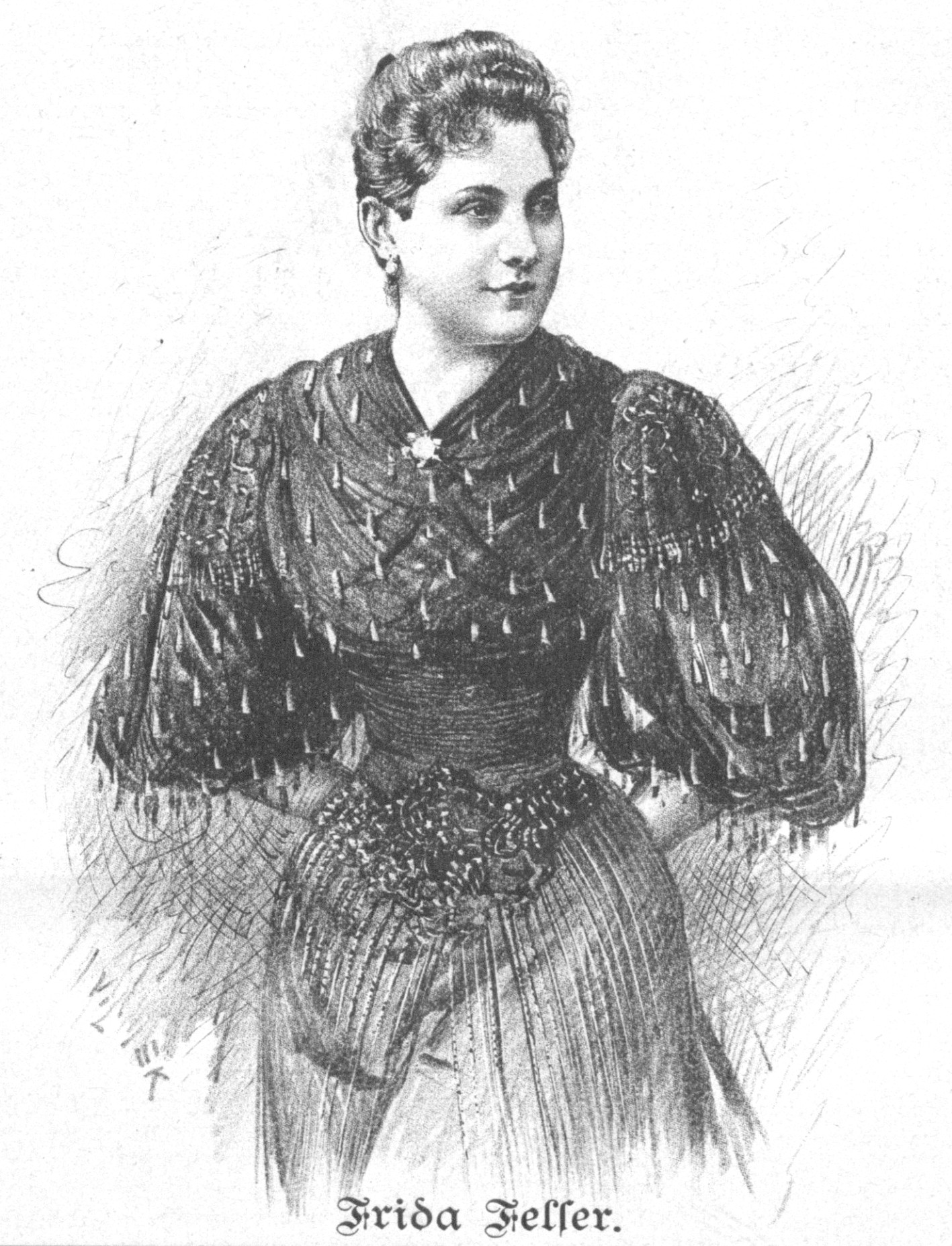
- Born: 3 March 1872; Munich, German Empire
- Died: 16 February 1941 (aged 68); Cologne, North Rhine-Westphalia, Germany
- Occupation(s): Opera singer, actress

Frida Felser (3 March 1872 – 16 February 1941) was a German soprano opera singer and actress.

== Early life and education ==
Frida Felser was born on 3 March 1872 in Munich and was trained at the Royal Bavarian Music School, where she was a pupil of Max Zenger. In her final year at the school, she was awarded the Baron Königswarter Award, which is typically only given after students complete their studies.

== Career ==
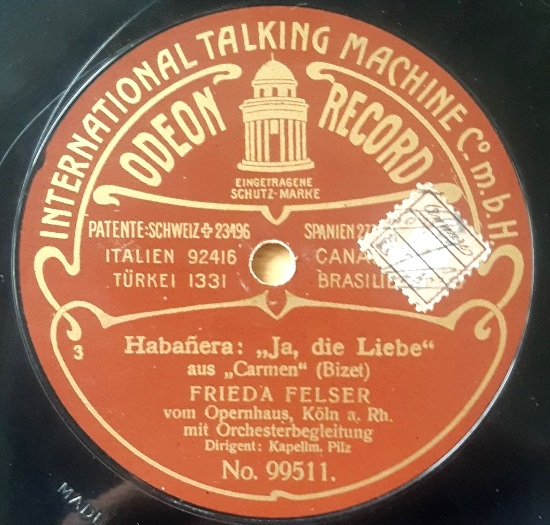
Recording of Frida Felser in 1910 in Berlin

Felser began her stage career in 1890 in Salzburg as an opera soubrette and then moved to the Stadttheater Würzburg in 1891, and then in 1892 to the Carl Schultze Theater in Hamburg where she worked as a singer and actress until 1895. While still at the Carl Schultze Theater, she performed at the Burgtheater in Vienna as Sassi in The Gypsy Baron by Johann Strauss II, despite having never sung the role before, and was lauded for her performance and voice and leading to requests for a permanent engagement at there. Felser also earned unanimous praise for her acting and voice as Redda in Ruggero Leoncavallo's Der Bajazzo. After leaving the Carl Schultze Theater she was engaged in Reichenburg in 1896 and Düsseldorf in 1897 and 1898. While at Dusseldorf, she played the titular character in Hermann Goetz's Der Widerspänstigen Zähmung.

She was then a part of the ensemble of the Cologne City Theatre, where she was highly respected and often played soubrette and youthful dramatic roles. In 1900, Felser, among other Cologne musicians, performed a concert in Paris, and was praised by the critics there. In 1901, she portrayed Hansel in Engelbert Humperdinck's Hansel and Gretel at The Royal Opera in London. Felser left the Cologne City Theatre in 1905 and then joined the Vienna Court Opera for the next season. After that, she worked at the Komische Oper Berlin for the 1906–1907 season before returning to the Cologne Theatre. Felser also played the titular role in Carmen at a guest performance at the Bavarian State Opera in 1906.

Throughout her career, she participated in many guest performances at various theatres, such as in Leipzig in 1898, the Theater des Westens in Berlin and Königliches Hoftheater Dresden in 1899, and in Brno and the Mannheim Court Theatre in 1906.

Her voice was described as "sonorous, pleasant, well-trained and touching". Among her other roles were the titular role in Louise, Cherubino in The Marriage of Figaro, Santuzza in Cavalleria rusticana, Page in Les Huguenots, Leonore in Alessandro Stradella, Sulamith in Die Königin von Saba, Malielia in I gioielli della Madonna and Rachel in La Juive.

== Later life and death ==
In her later career, she worked as a teacher in Cologne. Felser died there on 16 February 1941, at the age of 68.
