= Delling =

Delling may refer to:

- August Delling (1895–1962), World War I flying ace
- Gerhard Delling (born 1959), German journalist
- Dellingr, a god of Norse mythology

== See also ==
- Dellinger (disambiguation)
