= Dellinger (surname) =

Dellinger is a surname. Notable people with the surname include:

- Bill Dellinger (1934–2025), American middle-distance runner and coach
- David Dellinger (1915–2004), American pacifist and activist for nonviolent social change
- Garrett Dellinger (born 2002), American football player
- Hampton Dellinger (born 1967), American politician, 2008 Democratic nomination for Lieutenant Governor of North Carolina
- John Howard Dellinger (1886-1962), American telecommunication engineer and vice chairman of Institute of Radio Engineers
- Matt Dellinger, US journalist of The New Yorker
- Rudolf Dellinger (1857–1910), German composer, Kapellmeister
- Walter Dellinger (1941–2022), American jurist, United States Solicitor General 1996–1997

Fictional

- Dellinger is a character in One Piece in who fights with kicks.

== See also ==
- Dillinger (surname)
