= Richard Loree Anderson =

American econometrician (1915-2003)

Richard L. Anderson
- Born: April 20, 1915; North Liberty, Indiana, US
- Died: February 19, 2003 (aged 88); Lexington, Kentucky, US
- Education: Iowa State College; DePauw University
- Scientific career
- Fields: Econometrics
- Institutions: University of Kentucky; North Carolina State University
- Doctoral advisor: Gerhard Tintner
- Doctoral students: Geoffrey Watson

Richard Loree Anderson (April 20, 1915 – February 19, 2003) was an American econometrician. He was a Professor of Statistics at North Carolina State University from 1941 to 1966. In 1967, he took up chairmanship of the newly established Department of Statistics at the University of Kentucky, a position he held until 1979. In 1951 he was elected as a Fellow of the American Statistical Association. While a professor at the University of Kentucky, he consulted with a number of drug companies on clinical trials. Even before, he had been consulting several computer programming companies including IMSL, BMDP, and SAS.

Anderson was good friends with William Gemmell Cochran before the latter died in 1980. The two had first met at Iowa State University in 1938.

== Research ==
In 1942, Anderson found the probability density function of the serial correlation coefficient $R_N := \frac{X_1X_{L + 1} + X_2X_{L + 2} + \cdots + X_NX_L - (\sum_i X_i)^2/N}{\sum_i X_i^2 - (\sum_i X_i)^2/N}$ when the variables $X_i$ are independent and identically distributed and follow the normal distribution. Anderson recalled that he preliminarily calculated this based on characteristic functions and presented it in the winter of 1940, but he thought it would be intractable for N > 9. The next day, he received a note from Cochran asking him to try out Cochran's theorem, which turned out to be the answer.

In 1962, Anderson, W. T. Wells, and John W. Cell calculated the probability density function for the product of two noncentral chi-squared variables using the Mellin transform.

In 1980, Anderson, Walter W. Stroup, and James W. Evans devised an algorithm to compute maximum likelihood estimates for the completely random balanced incomplete block design.

In 1985, Anderson, Sastry G. Pantula, and Larry A. Nelson, proposed an estimator for the covariance matrix for a mixed linear model, where the model describes an experiment conducted over several sites for several years. The model takes the form $y_{ijk} = \sum_{m = 1}^s x_{ijkm}\beta_m + u_{ijk}$, where i indexes sites, j indexes "blocks" at each site, and k indexes treatments.

In 1996, Anderson, Pao-Sheng Shen, and P. L. Cornelius used simulations to study nested mating designs. They concluded that asymptotic variances severely underestimate the actual variance in the simulation.

== Awards and honors ==
In 1992 Anderson was awarded the American Statistical Association's Founders Award.
