= Dillinger (disambiguation) =

John Dillinger (1903–1934) was an American gangster.

Dillinger may also refer to:

== Films ==
- Dillinger (1945 film), a film by Max Nosseck starring Lawrence Tierney
- Dillinger (1960 film), a TV film by Mel Ferber starring Ralph Meeker
- Dillinger (1973 film), a film by John Milius starring Warren Oates
- Dillinger (1991 film), a TV film by Rupert Wainwright starring Mark Harmon

== Other ==
- Dillinger (musician) (born 1953), reggae artist
- Dillinger (surname)
- Dillinger (bull), #81, a Professional Bull Riders World Champion bucking bull
- Dillinger Hütte, a German steel fabricator
- Dillinger, a thriller by Jack Higgins

== See also ==
- Dellinger (disambiguation)
- Derringer, a small firearm sometimes mistakenly identified as a 'dillinger'
- Dillinja (born 1974), reggae/drum and bass music producer
