= Dellinger =

Dellinger may refer to:

== Places ==
- Dellinger (crater), a lunar crater that is located on the Moon's far side
- 78392 Dellinger (2002 PM165), a main-belt asteroid discovered on 2002 by A. Lowe

== Other uses ==
- Dellinger (surname)
- Gundam Dellinger Arms, a mobile unit from the anime series Mobile Suit Gundam Wing
- Dellinger effect, a fadeout of short-wave radios caused by solar flares

== See also ==
- Dillinger (disambiguation)
