= Tamm (crater) =

Crater on the Moon

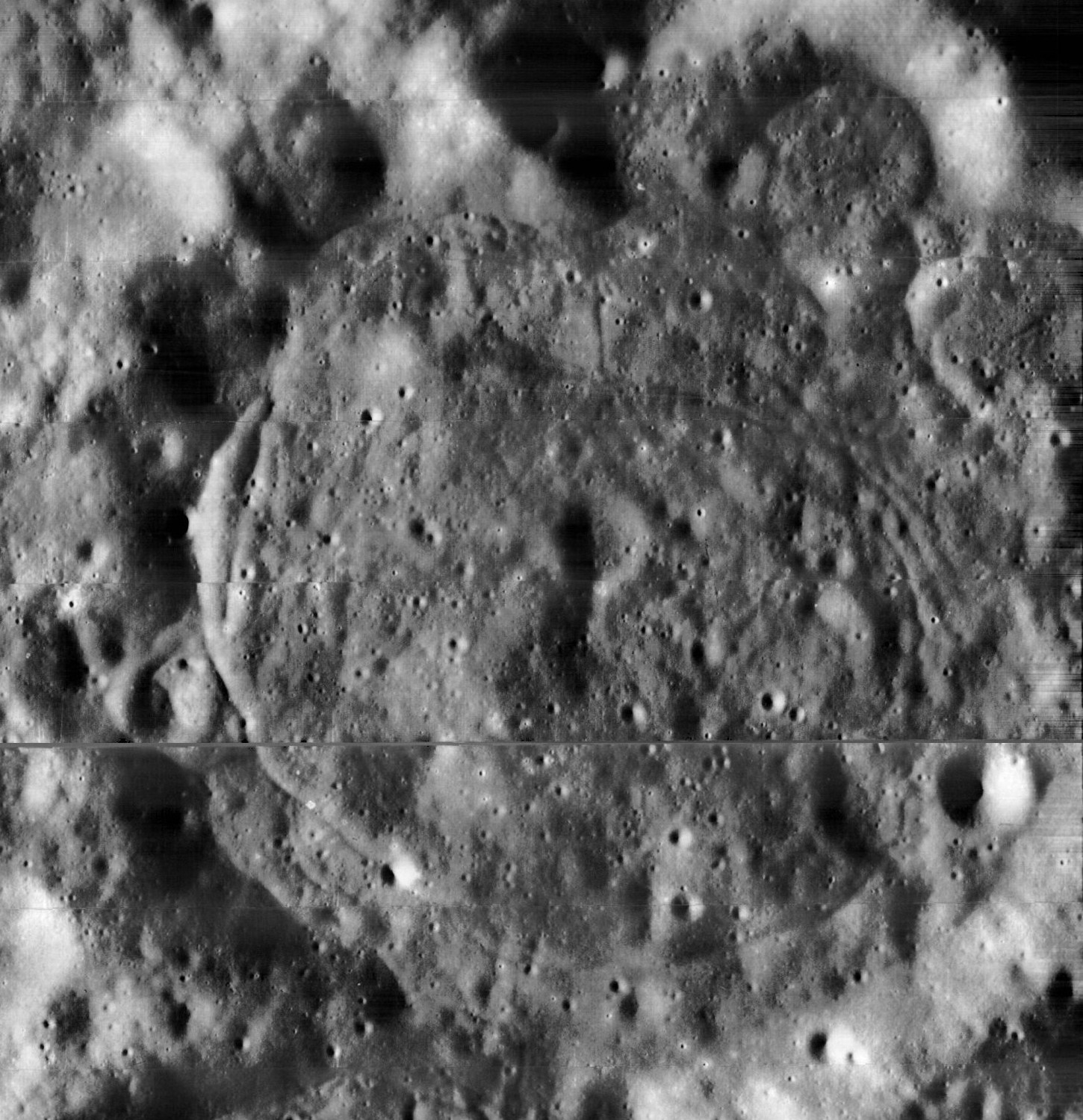
- Lunar Orbiter 1 image
- Coordinates: 4.4°S 146.4°E
- Diameter: 38 km
- Depth: Unknown
- Colongitude: 214° at sunrise
- Eponym: Igor Y. Tamm

Tamm is a shallow lunar impact crater. It is located to the west-northwest of the much larger and more prominent crater Chaplygin. Attached to the south-southwestern outer rim of Tamm is the smaller van den Bos. There is a gap in the southern rim where these two craters are joined together.

The rim of Tamm is worn and eroded, with old impact rims incising the northern edges. The rim edge is now a circular, uneven ring of ridges. The interior floor is level and is marked only by tiny craterlets and a few clefts along the edges. The floor has merged with the interior of van den Bos to the south.

It has been hypothesized that the fissured, viscous-appearing material within both Tamm and van den Bos was emplaced as impact melt from the Mendeleev basin 225 km to the northwest.

== Views ==
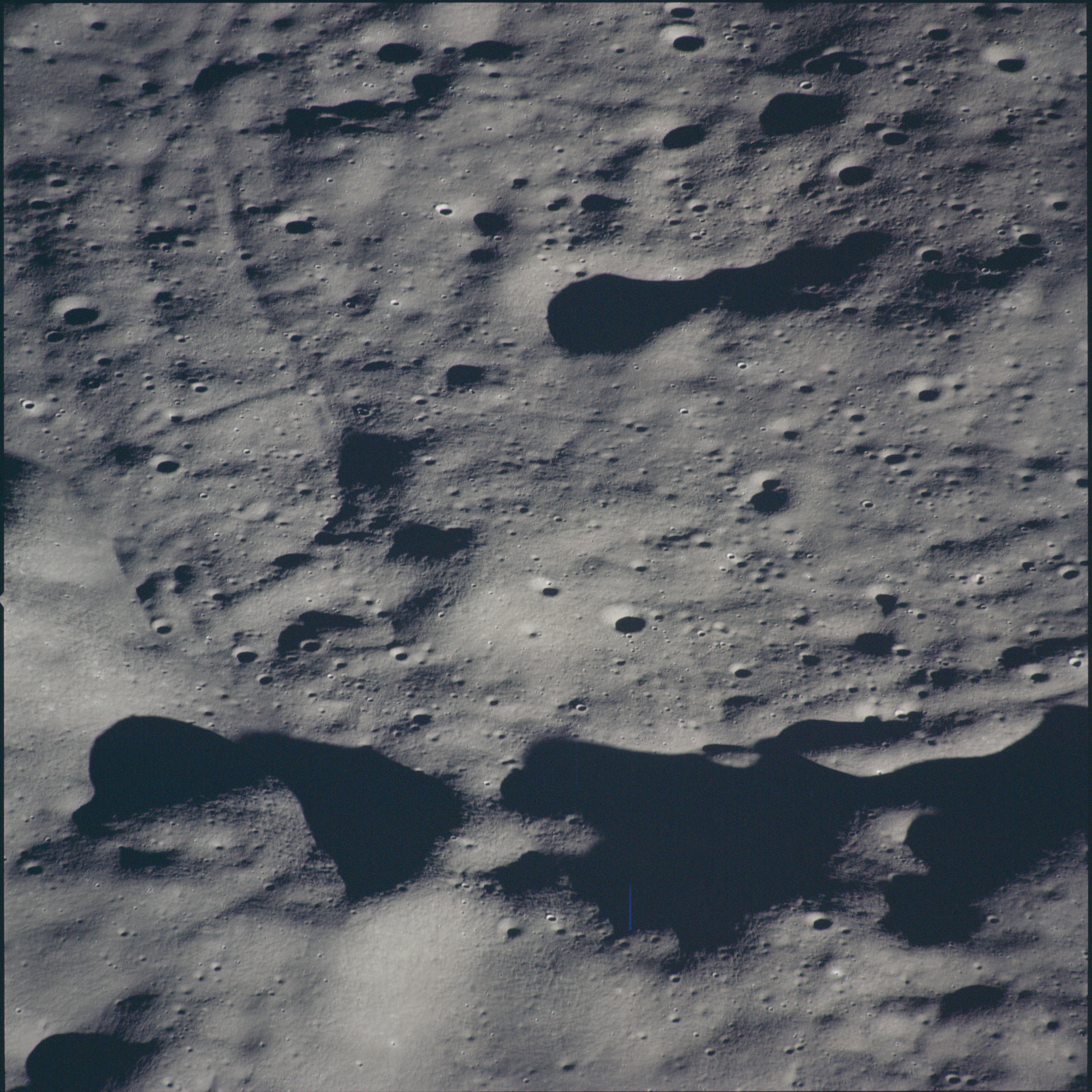
Oblique view facing east from Apollo 14

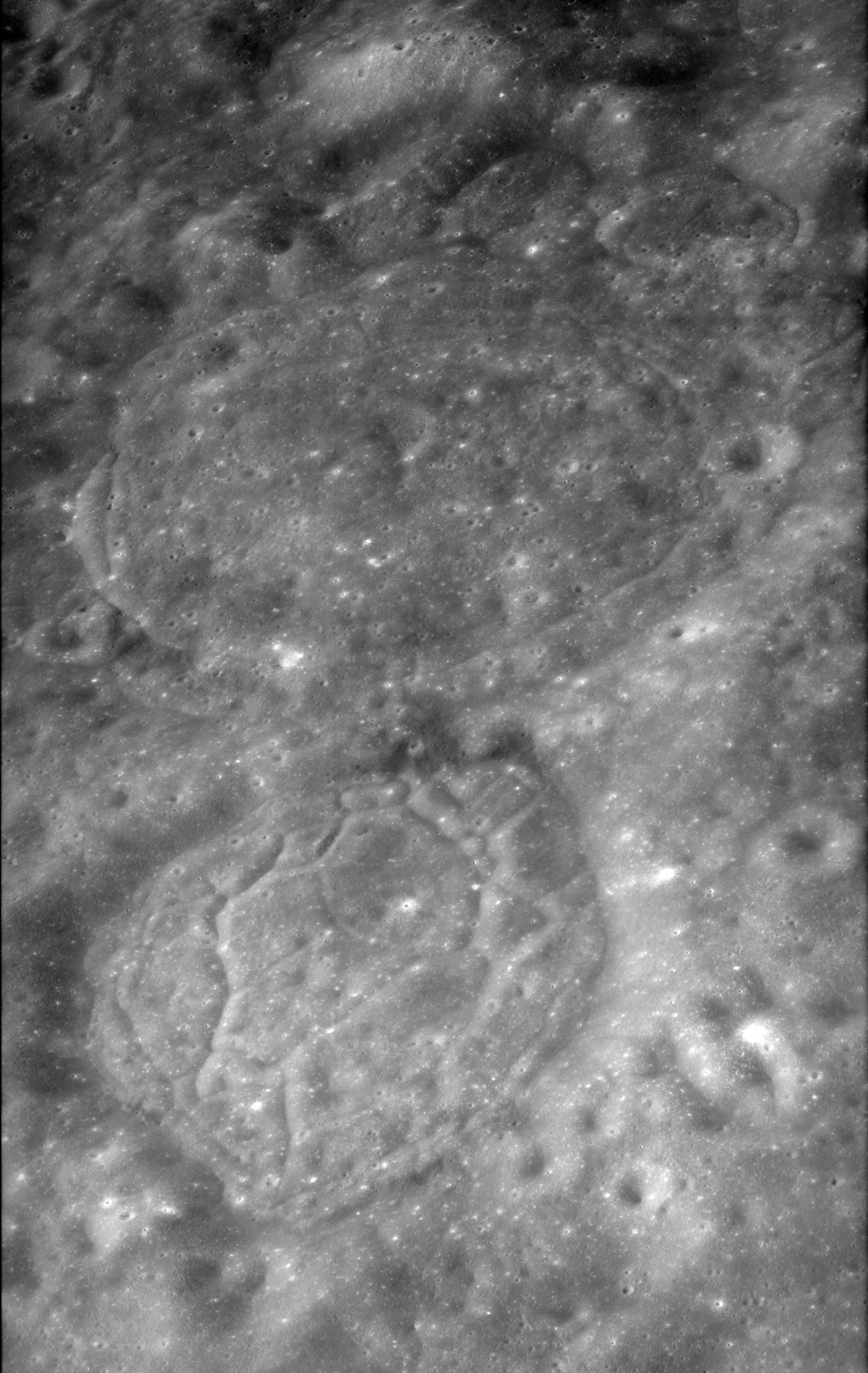
Oblique Apollo 17 panoramic camera image facing north with van den Bos below center and Tamm above center

== Satellite craters ==
By convention these features are identified on lunar maps by placing the letter on the side of the crater midpoint that is closest to Tamm.

| Tamm | Latitude | Longitude | Diameter |
|---|---|---|---|
| X | 2.7° S | 145.5° E | 13 km |
