= 1332 Marconia =

Main-belt asteroid

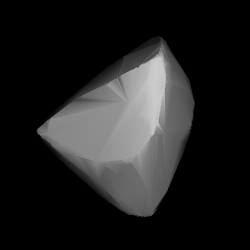
- Modelled shape of Marconia from its lightcurve

Discovery
- Discovered by: L. Volta
- Discovery site: Pino Torinese Obs.
- Discovery date: 9 January 1934

Designations
- Named after: Guglielmo Marconi (Italian engineer)
- Alternative designations: 1934 AA · 1930 HQ; 1932 VC · 1935 FR; 1948 SH · 1956 GB; A905 UD · A921 TE; A921 UD · A924 EH
- Minor planet category: main-belt · (outer); Marconia

Orbital characteristics
- Epoch 23 March 2018 (JD 2458200.5)
- Uncertainty parameter 0
- Observation arc: 112.02 yr (40,916 d)
- Aphelion: 3.4664 AU
- Perihelion: 2.6587 AU
- Semi-major axis: 3.0626 AU
- Eccentricity: 0.1319
- Orbital period (sidereal): 5.36 yr (1,958 d)
- Mean anomaly: 2.3975°
- Mean motion: 0° 11^{m} 2.04^{s} / day
- Inclination: 2.4568°
- Longitude of ascending node: 13.652°
- Argument of perihelion: 348.94°

Physical characteristics
- Mean diameter: 43.90 km (derived); 44.93±10.33 km 46.03±15.75 km 46.796±0.141 km 49.95±0.61 km 52.009±0.600 km
- Synodic rotation period: 19.16±0.01 h 19.2264±0.0001 h 32.1201±0.0005 h
- Geometric albedo: 0.04±0.02; 0.04±0.04; 0.0527 (derived); 0.0543±0.0105; 0.060±0.002; 0.063±0.008
- Spectral type: SMASS = Ld; L (Bus–DeMeo)
- Absolute magnitude (H): 10.20 · 10.50; 10.6 · 10.62

1332 Marconia, provisional designation 1934 AA, is a dark asteroid and the parent body of the Marconia family located in the outer regions of the asteroid belt. It measures approximately 46 kilometers (29 miles) in diameter. The asteroid was discovered on 9 January 1934, by Italian astronomer Luigi Volta at the Observatory of Turin in Pino Torinese, northern Italy. It was named for Italian electrical engineer Guglielmo Marconi. The uncommon L-type asteroid has a rotation period of 19.2 hours.

== Orbit and classification ==
Marconia is the parent body of the Marconia family (636), a tiny asteroid family of less than 50 known members. It orbits the Sun in the outer asteroid belt at a distance of 2.7–3.5 AU once every 5 years and 4 months (1,958 days; semi-major axis of 3.06 AU). Its orbit has an eccentricity of 0.13 and an inclination of 2° with respect to the ecliptic.

The asteroid was first observed in October 1905, as A905 UD at Heidelberg Observatory, where the body's observation arc begins as A924 EH in March 1924, almost 10 years prior to its official discovery observation at Pino Torinese.

== Physical characteristics ==
Marconia has been characterized as an L-type asteroid in the Bus–DeMeo taxonomic system, while in the SMASS classification, it is an Ld-subtype that transitions between the L-type and D-type asteroids. The overall spectral type for members of the Marconia family is that of a carbonaceous C-type and X-type.

=== Rotation period and poles ===
In September 2012, a first rotational lightcurve of Marconia was obtained from photometric observations by Robert Stephens at his Santana Observatory (646) in California. Lightcurve analysis gave a well-defined rotation period of 19.16 hours with a brightness variation of 0.30 magnitude (U=3).

A 2016-published lightcurve, using modeled photometric data from the Lowell Photometric Database, gave a concurring sidereal period of 19.2264 hours, as well as a spin axes of (37.0°, 31.0°) and (220.0°, 31.0°) in ecliptic coordinates (λ, β). Conversely, another lightcurve inversion study by an international collaboration gave a longer spin rate of 32.1201 hours.

=== Diameter and albedo ===
According to the surveys carried out by the Japanese Akari satellite and the NEOWISE mission of NASA's Wide-field Infrared Survey Explorer, Marconia measures between 44.93 and 52.009 kilometers in diameter and its surface has an albedo between 0.04 and 0.063.

The Collaborative Asteroid Lightcurve Link derives an albedo of 0.0527 and a diameter of 43.90 kilometers based on an absolute magnitude of 10.6.

== Naming ==
This minor planet was named after Guglielmo Marconi (1874–1937), an Italian electrical engineer, pioneer and inventor of radio. In 1909, he received the Nobel Prize in Physics together with Karl Ferdinand Braun (also see List of Nobel laureates in Physics § Laureates). The official naming citation was mentioned in The Names of the Minor Planets by Paul Herget in 1955 (H 121). The lunar crater Marconi was also named in his honor.
