= Claude Hillinger =

German-American economist

- Born: 27 June 1930; Berlin, Prussia, Germany
- Died: 19 March 2020 (aged 89)

Academic background
- Education: University of Chicago; City College of New York
- Influences: Robert Basmann

Academic work
- Discipline: Econometrics
- Institutions: LMU Munich; Case Western Reserve University
- Website: Information at IDEAS / RePEc

Claude Hillinger (27 June 1930 – 19 March 2020) was a German-American economist. He was a professor of economics at LMU Munich from 1972 to 1995.

Born in Berlin shortly before the Machtergreifung, Hillinger emigrated with his family to Turkey in 1937. He grew up living in Istanbul and Ankara until 1948, when he moved to New York City. Partly in evening courses, he attained his bachelor's degree and later an MBA from City College of New York in 1953 and 1959, respectively. He then went on to earn a PhD in economics from the University of Chicago in 1963. His dissertation, advised by Robert Basmann, contained econometric tests of Lloyd Metzler's inventory cycle model of the business cycle.

After working as a lecturer at the University at Buffalo until 1966, Hillinger became an assistant professor at Case Western Reserve University in Cleveland. In 1972, he moved back to Germany, becoming a professor of economics at LMU Munich.

Hillinger was an advocate of utilitarian or cardinal voting systems (primarily combined approval voting) rather than ranked voting systems.

Hillinger died on 19 March 2020, at the age of 89.

== Publications ==
- Unnatural science: The conflict between reason and ideology in economics and the other social sciences, Collected works of Claude Hillinger, Volume I Published 17 Nov 2015 by WEA Books
