= Glazenap (crater) =

Crater on the Moon

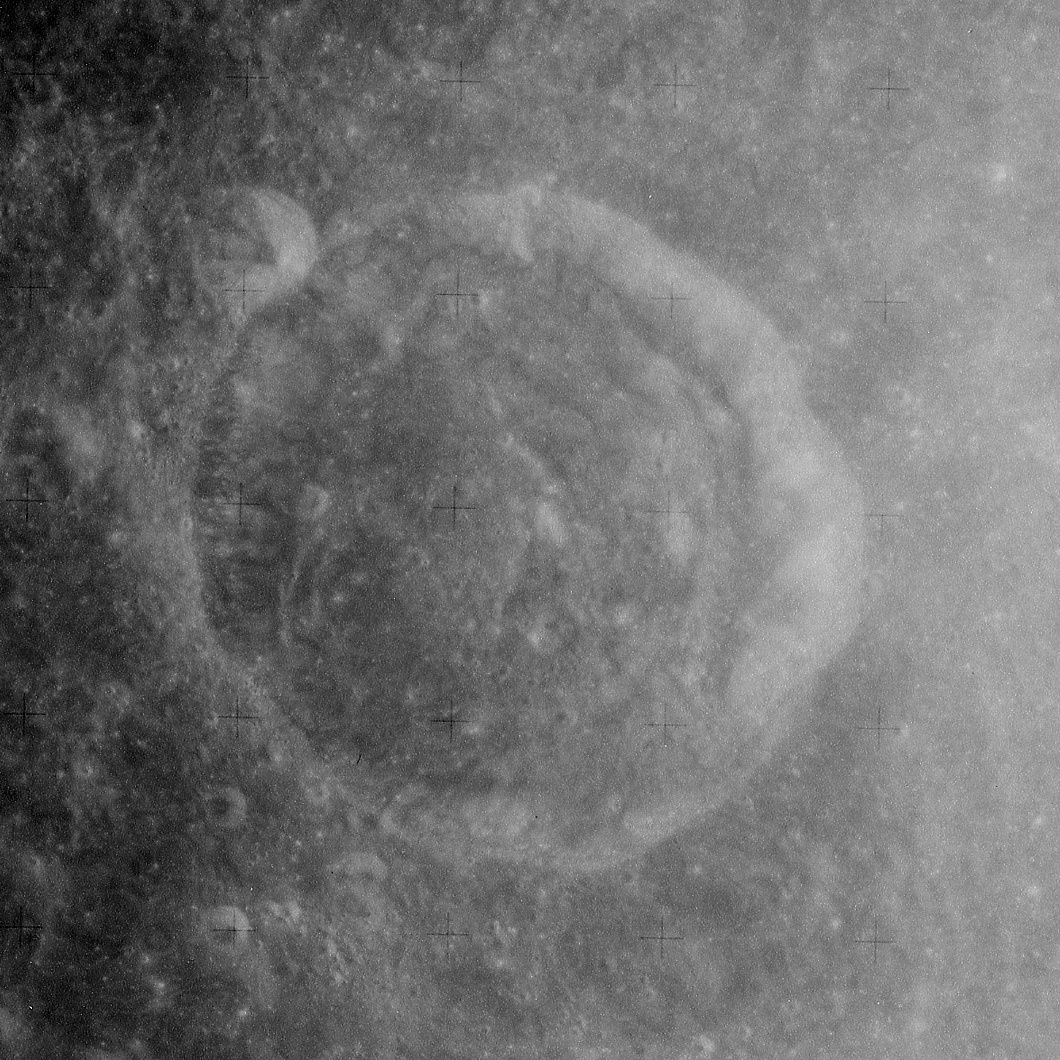
- Apollo 17 image
- Coordinates: 1.6°S 137.6°E
- Diameter: 43 km
- Depth: Unknown
- Colongitude: 223° at sunrise
- Eponym: Sergej P. von Glazenap

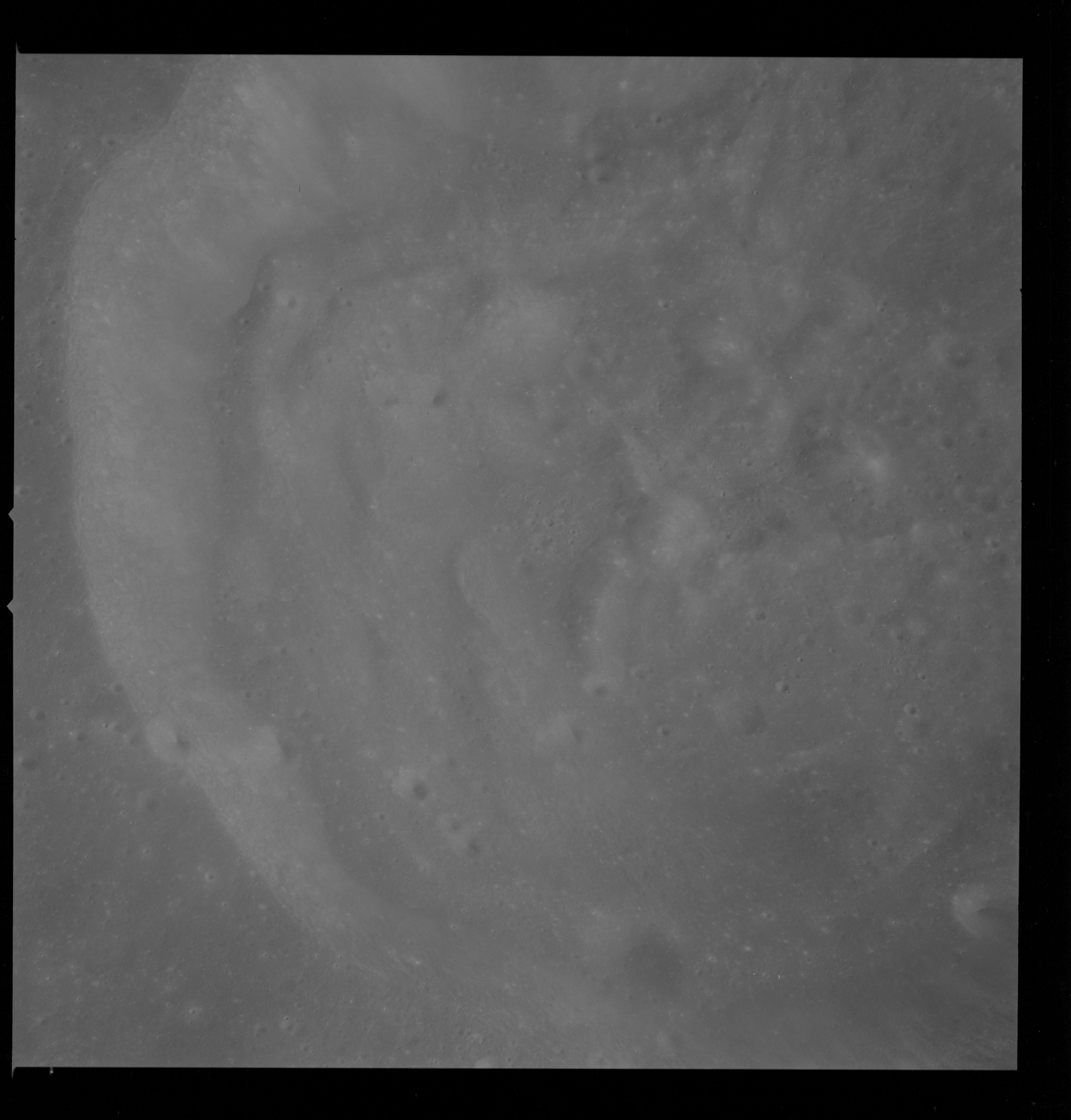
Closeup from Apollo 10

Glazenap is a lunar impact crater that is located on the Moon's far side. It lies to the south-southwest of a huge walled plain called Mendeleev, and to the northwest of the crater Pannekoek. This crater is nearly circular, and has not been significantly eroded. However, a small crater lies across the northwestern rim. The loose material deposited along the inner walls has accumulated at the base in a ring of scree about the interior floor.

== Satellite craters ==
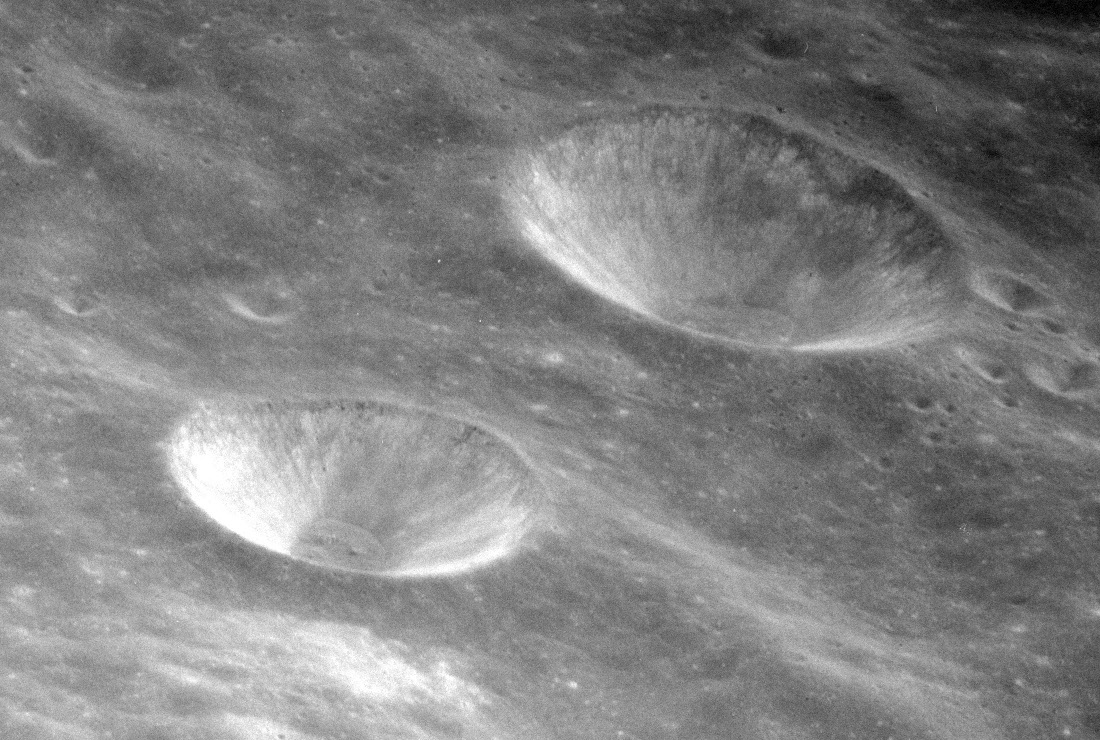
Glazenap E (upper right) and Glazenap F (lower left) from Apollo 11

By convention, these features are identified on lunar maps by placing the letter on the side of the crater midpoint that is closest to Glazenap.

Glazenap	Latitude	Longitude	Diameter
E	1.4° S	139.0° E	14 km
F	1.5° S	139.7° E	11 km
P	5.0° S	136.0° E	57 km
S	2.0° S	134.3° E	28 km
V	0.6° S	136.0° E	22 km
