= Gerhard Tintner =

German-American economist (1907–1983)

- Born: 29 September 1907; Nuremberg, Kingdom of Bavaria, German Empire
- Died: 13 November 1983 (aged 76); Vienna, Austria

Academic background
- Education: University of Vienna
- Doctoral advisor: Ludwig von Mises
- Influences: Oskar Morgenstern

Academic work
- Discipline: Econometrics
- Institutions: Iowa State University; University of Southern California
- Doctoral students: Richard Loree Anderson; Clifford Hildreth; Robert Basmann

Gerhard Tintner (29 September 1907 – 13 November 1983) was an Austrian economist who worked most of his career in the United States. Tintner is known for his contributions during the formation years of econometrics as a discipline. In a festschrift in honor of Tintner's 60th birthday, Karl A. Fox lauded Tintner as one of the "foremost econometricians of our time."

Born to Austrian parents in Nuremberg, Bavaria, Tintner studied economics, statistics, and law at the University of Vienna, where he received his doctor's degree in 1929. He was a staff member of the Austrian Institute of Economic Research in 1936, before leaving Austria for the United States, "as he was pessimistic regarding the future of Austria". He briefly worked as a Research Fellow at the Cowles Commission before joining faculty at Iowa State College, where he was promoted professor in 1946. In 1951 he was elected as a Fellow of the American Statistical Association. He remained at Iowa State until 1962, when he resigned to join the staff of the University of Pittsburgh. In 1963, he accepted a position as Distinguished Professor of Economics and Mathematics at the University of Southern California. Returning to Austria in 1973, he accepted an appointment as Professor and Head (1973–1978) of the Institut für Ökonometrie at Vienna University of Technology, a position he held until retirement.

== Selected publications ==
- Tintner, G. (1952). Econometrics. John Wiley & Sons, New York and Chapman & Hall, London
- Tintner, G. (1941). The theory of choice under subjective risk and uncertainty. Econometrica: Journal of the Econometric Society, 298–304.
- Tintner, G. (1946). A note on welfare economics. Econometrica, Journal of the Econometric Society, 69–78.
- Tintner, G. (1953). The definition of econometrics. Econometrica: Journal of the Econometric Society, 31–40.
