= Charles Hillinger =

American journalist

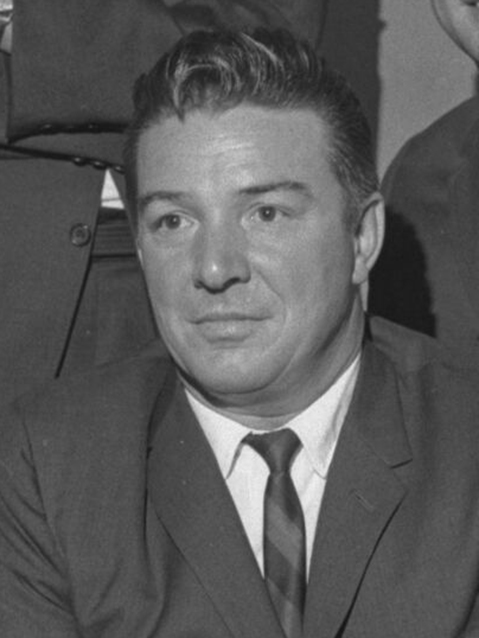
- Hillinger in 1963
- Born: April 1, 1926; Evanston, Illinois, U.S.
- Died: April 28, 2008 (aged 82); Rancho Palos Verdes, California, U.S.
- Education: University of California, Los Angeles
- Occupation: Journalist
- Spouse: Arliene Hillinger
- Children: 1 son, 1 daughter

Charles Hillinger (April 1, 1926 – April 28, 2008) was an American journalist. He wrote for the Los Angeles Times from 1946 to 1992, initially as a reporter, and eventually as a feature writer and a columnist. He authored several books, including California Characters: An Array of Amazing People, a collection of his columns.

== Life ==
Hillinger was born on April 1, 1926, in Evanston, Illinois. He graduated from the University of California, Los Angeles (UCLA), where he earned a bachelor's degree in Political Science.

Hillinger joined Los Angeles Times in 1946. He initially worked in its editorial library, and he later became a reporter. He penned a column called Charles Hillinger's California from 1985 to 1991. During that time, he wrote feature articles about individuals all over the country, including Puerto Rico and the Virgin Islands. He retired in 1992.

Hillinger was honored with an NAACP Image Award in 1980. He authored three books and edited a fourth book about the Bel Air Country Club. His 2000 book, California Characters: An Array of Amazing People, was a collection of some of his columns. For Jonathan Kirsch, "Hillinger's book is never a freak show, and more often than not the profiles are little morality plays."

With his wife Arliene, Hillinger had a son, Brad, and a daughter, Tori Lindman. He died on April 28, 2008, in Rancho Palos Verdes, California. His funeral was held at the Rolling Hills Covenant Church in Rolling Hills Estates, California.

== Works ==
- Hillinger, Charles (1958). The California Islands; with photos. Los Angeles, California: Academy Publishing. OCLC 68152931.
- Hillinger, Charles, ed. (1993). Bel-Air Country Club: A Living Legend. Los Angeles, California: Bel-Air Country Club. ISBN 9780963920508. OCLC 43392892.
- Hillinger, Charles (1998). Charles Hillinger's Channel Islands: Santa Catalina, Santa Cruz, Anacapa, San Miguel, San Nicolas, Santa Rosa, San Clemente, Santa Barbara. Santa Barbara, California: Santa Cruz Island Foundation. ISBN 9781886342040. OCLC 40015685.
- Hillinger, Charles (2000). California Characters: An Array of Amazing People. Santa Barbara, California: Capra Press. ISBN 9780884964438. OCLC 1001902127.
