= Dillinger (surname) =

Dillinger is a surname of German origin, and has additional uses.

== Notable people with the surname ==
- Adolf Dillinger (1846–1922), German printer and publisher
- Bob Dillinger (1918–2009), professional baseball player
- Daz Dillinger (born 1973), hip hop music producer and rapper
- Edmund Dillinger (1935–2022), German Roman Catholic clergy
- Harley Dillinger (1894-1959), professional baseball player
- Jared Dillinger (born 1984), Filipino-American professional basketball player
- John Dillinger (1903–1934), outlaw gangster of the Great Depression era
- Wendy Dillinger (born 1974), head women's soccer coach at Iowa State University

== Stage name ==
- Dillinger (musician)
- Dillinger Four (punk band)
- Tye Dillinger (born 1981), professional wrestler

== Fictional entities ==
- Ed Dillinger, the fictional villain in the Walt Disney Pictures film Tron (1982)
- François Dillinger, character of C. D. Payne's novel Youth in Revolt (1993)

== See also ==
- Dellinger (surname)
- Dillinger (disambiguation)
