= Pannekoek (crater) =

Crater on the Moon

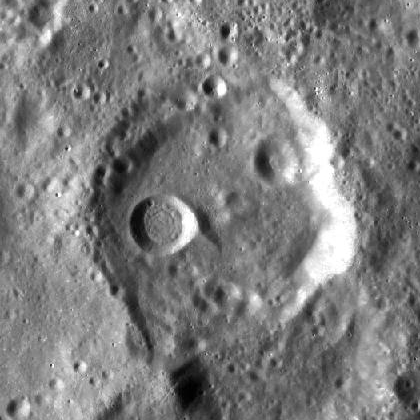
- LRO image
- Coordinates: 4.20°S 140.69°E
- Diameter: 67.5 km
- Depth: Unknown
- Colongitude: 220° at sunrise
- Eponym: Anton Pannekoek

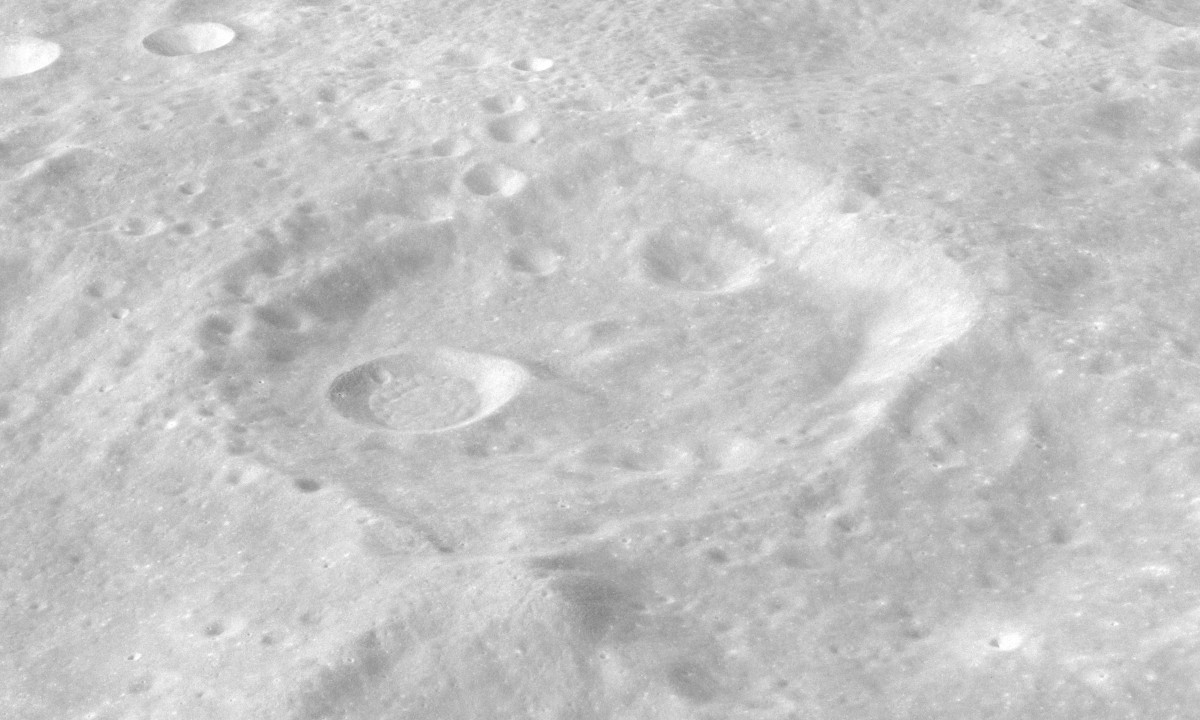
Oblique Apollo 17 mapping camera image, facing north

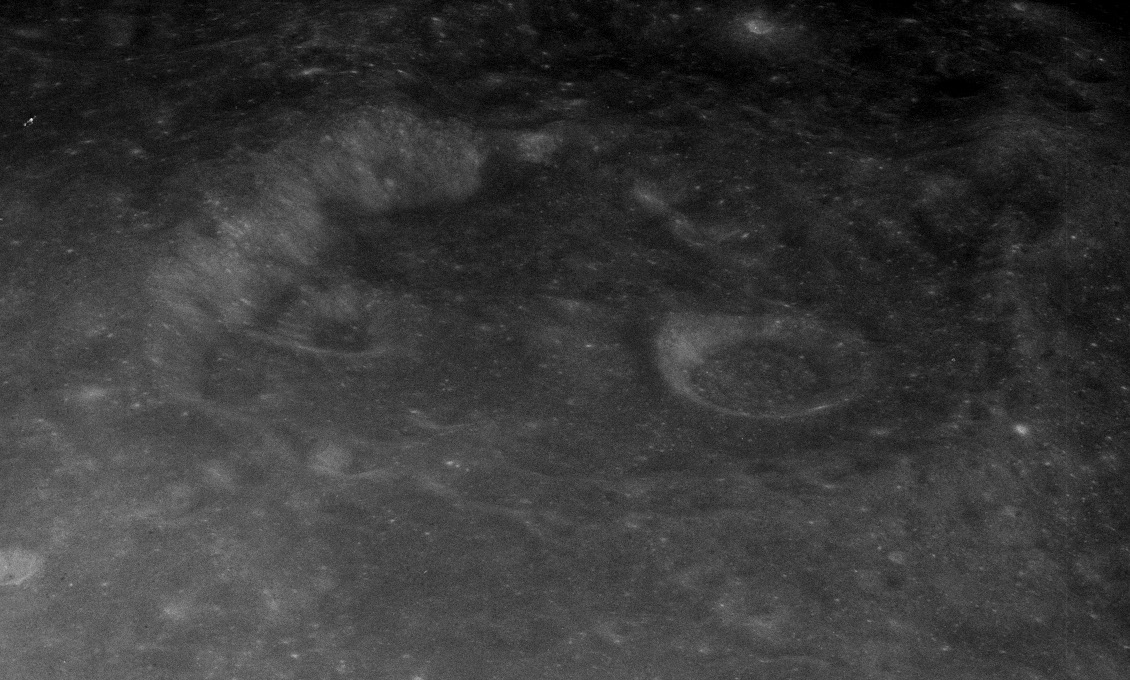
Oblique Apollo 11 image, facing southeast

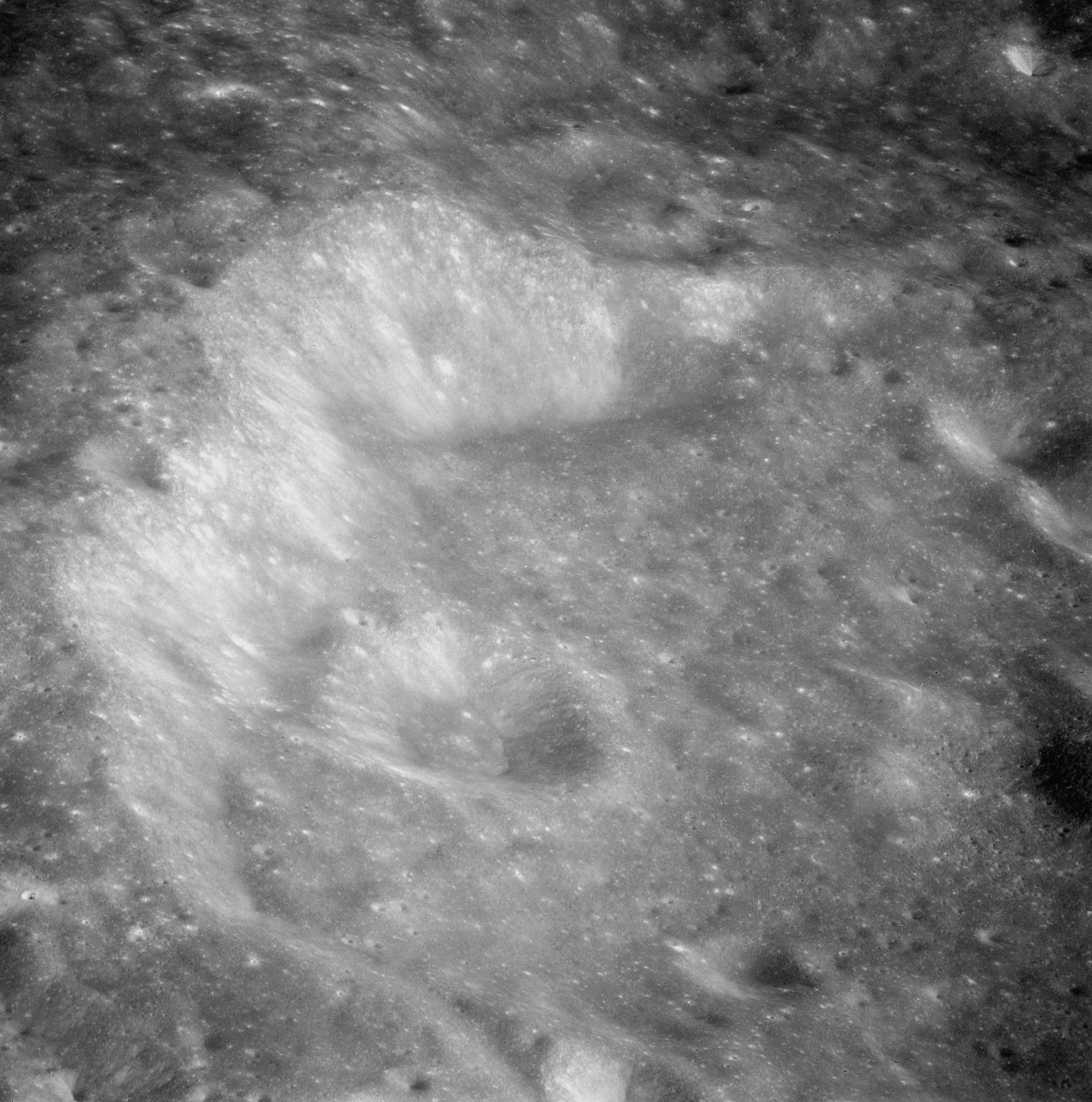
Oblique Apollo 10 image of the east rim

Pannekoek is a lunar impact crater that is situated on the far side of the Moon, and cannot be seen directly from the Earth. The crater lies along the northern edge of the slightly larger Dellinger, and their common border forms an area of uneven terrain. Due north of Pannekoek is a huge walled plain named Mendeleev. Glazenap crater is to the northwest.

The crater was named after Dutch astronomer and father of Council Communism, Antonie Pannekoek by the IAU in 1970. The crater was known as Crater 292 prior to naming.

This is a worn and eroded crater, although the perimeter of the rim is still visible. The southern part of the interior floor is jumbled and irregular. There is a small crater next to the inner wall along the west-southwest part of the floor. A smaller crater also lies in the interior along the northeast inner wall. There are also several small craterlets on the floor.

== Satellite craters ==
By convention, these features are identified on lunar maps by placing the letter on the side of the crater midpoint that is closest to Pannekoek.

Pannekoek S is similar to a few other far-side craters like Mandel'shtam Q and Barbier F that have hummocky floors.

Pannekoek	Latitude	Longitude	Diameter
A	0.9° S	141.0° E	28 km
D	2.6° S	143.5° E	28 km
R	5.4° S	138.3° E	71 km
S	4.4° S	140.1° E	18 km
T	4.1° S	138.2° E	25 km

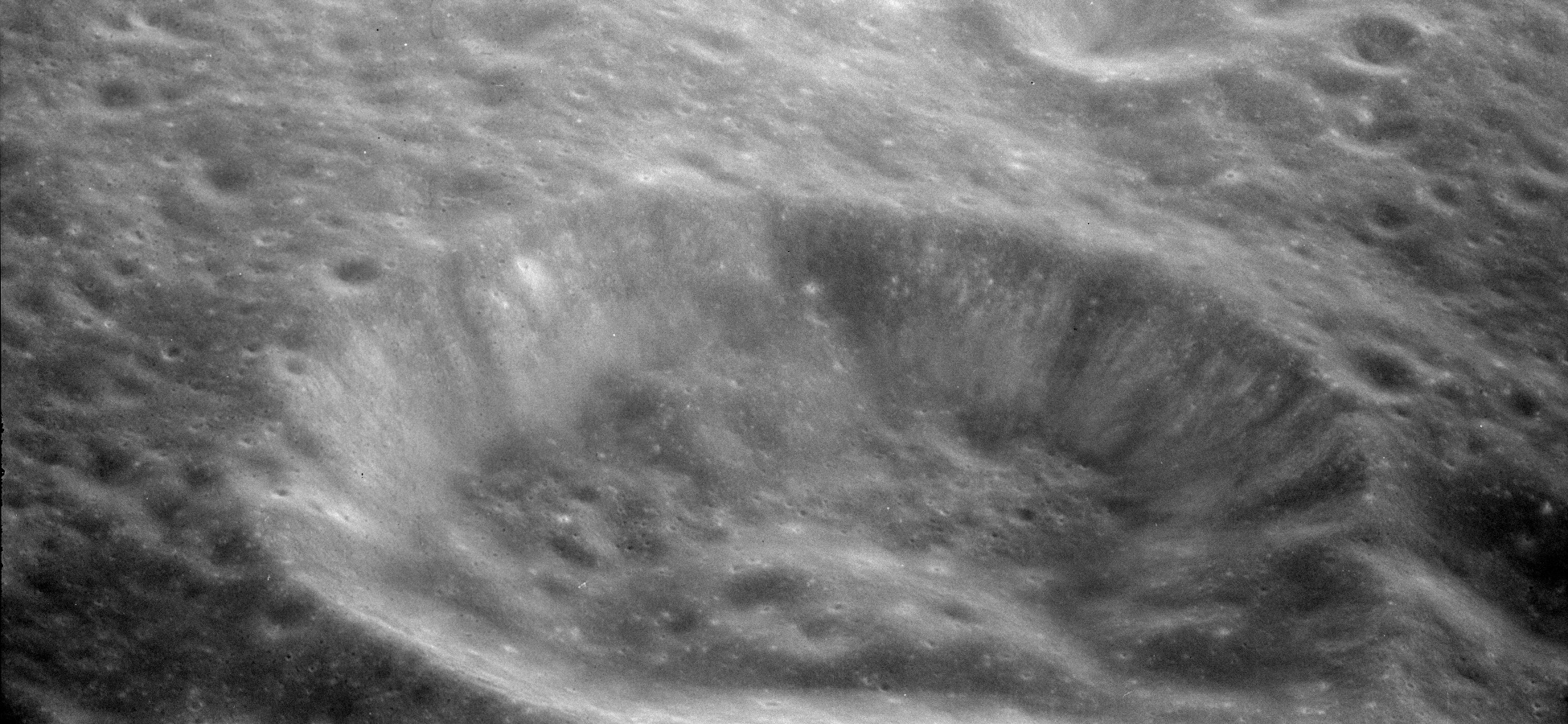
Pannekoek A (Apollo 11)

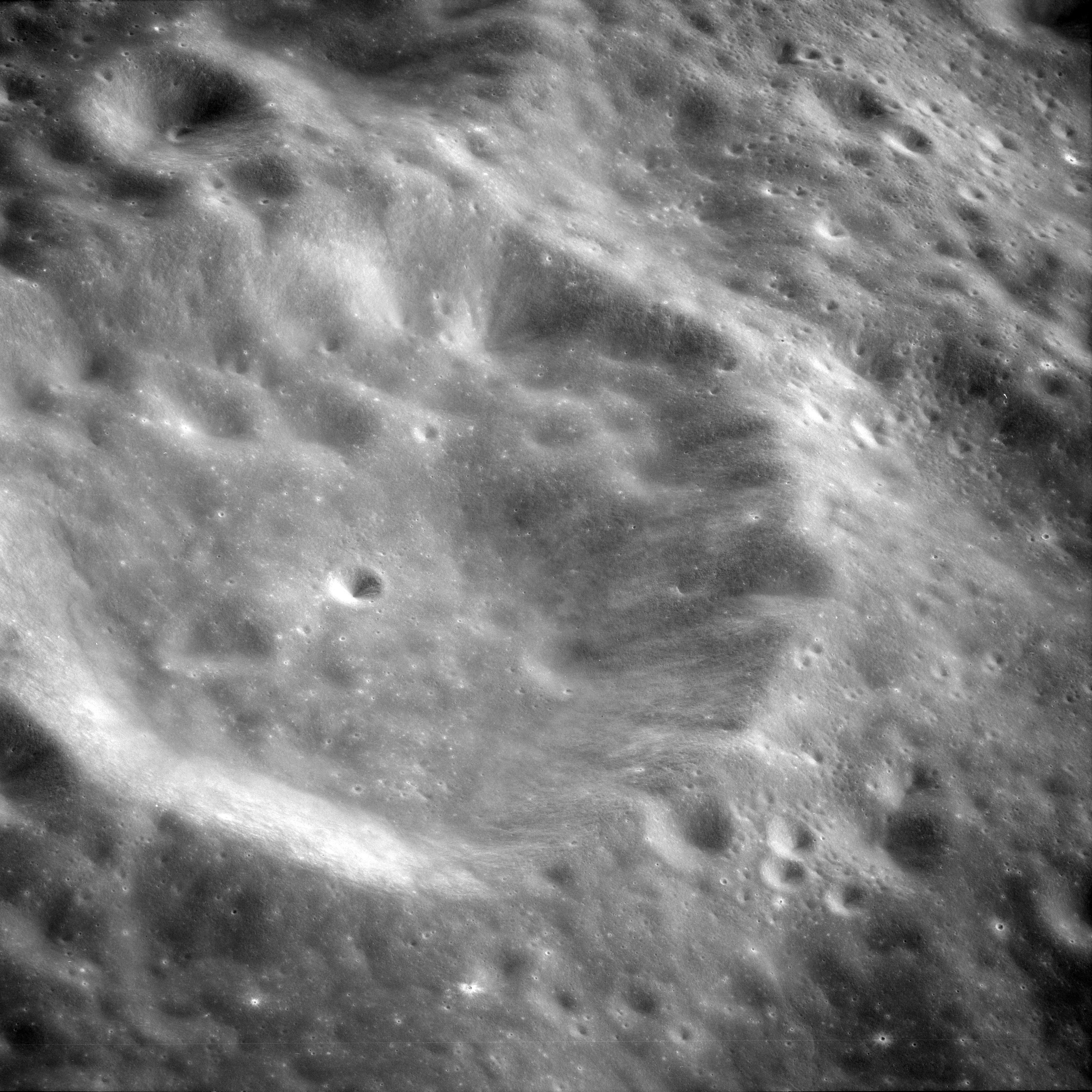
Pannekoek D (Apollo 11)

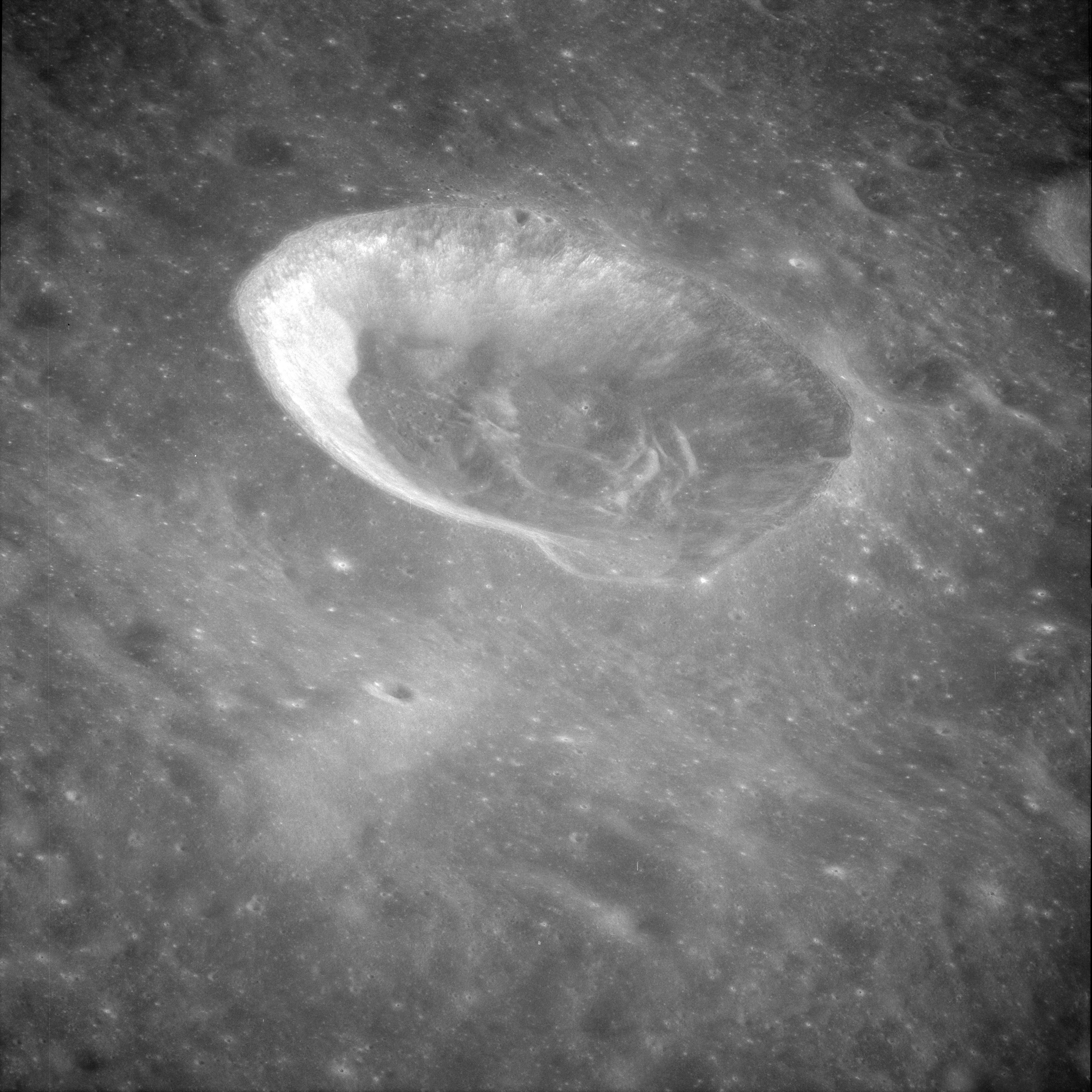
Pannekoek T (Apollo 11)

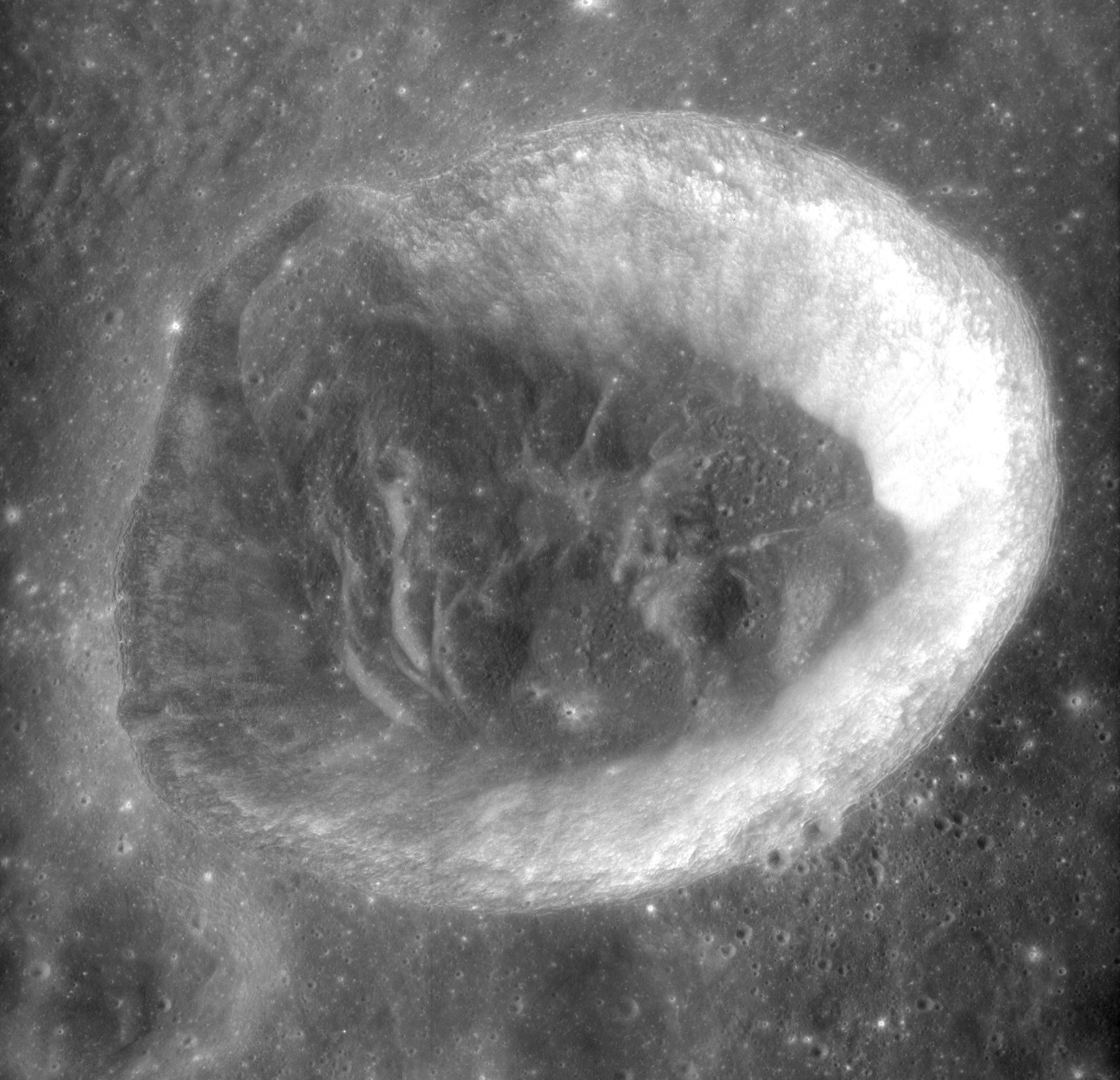
Pannekoek T (Apollo 17)

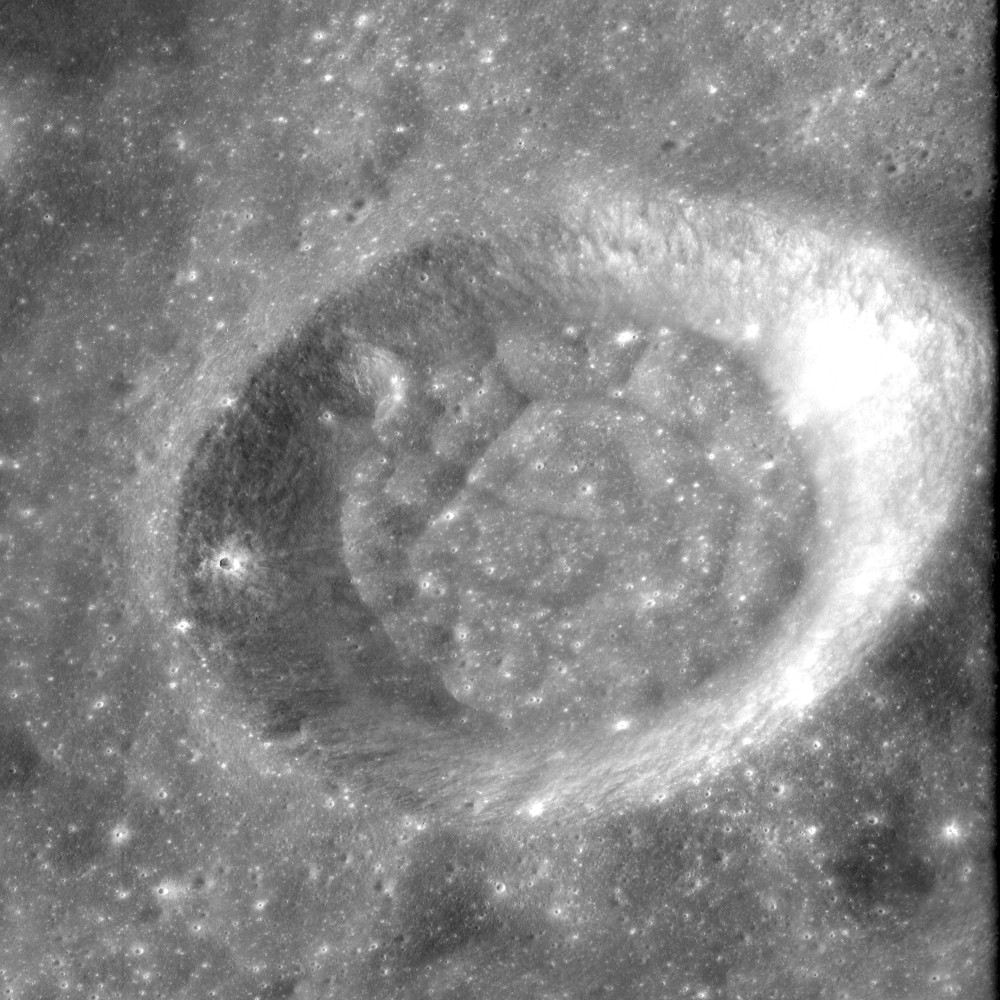
Pannekoek S (Apollo 17)
