= Robert Basmann =

American econometrician (1926–2024)

Robert L. Basmann
- Born: January 15, 1926; Davenport, Iowa, U.S.
- Died: April 18, 2024 (aged 98); Vestal, New York, U.S.
- Spouse: Nancy J Wulwick

Academic background
- Education: Iowa State University
- Influences: Gerhard Tintner

Academic work
- Discipline: Econometrics
- Institutions: General Electric, Purdue University, Texas A&M, State University of New York at Binghamton
- Notable ideas: Two stage least squares, methods of estimating systems of equations, consumer preference theory, experimental economics.
- Awards: Fulbright Grant, NSF grant

Robert Leon Basmann (January 15, 1926 – April 18, 2024) was an American econometrician.

== Biography ==
Robert Basmann was born in Davenport, Iowa, on January 15, 1926. He served in the United States military from 1944-1954, when he left as a reserve commissioned officer at the rank of first lieutenant in order to pursue a doctorate. He earned a Ph.D. in economics under the early econometrician Gerard Tintner from Iowa State University in 1955. He then won a Fulbright Grant to the University of Oslo and taught a year at Northwestern University. Basmann’s writings at the time made path-breaking and deep contributions to simultaneous equation models, finite sample distribution, and identification. He received credit along with Henri Thiel for the derivation of two stage least squares, an important estimation technique.

In 1963 Basmann took a position at Purdue University where he helped build a new graduate program in economics. He developed a module in modem logic to assist in the making of rigorous statistical inference. At Purdue and later Basmann helped prepare graduate students for careers the loved.

Several of his graduate students followed Basmann from Purdue in 1969 to Texas A&M University, where he pioneered research in the field of experimental economics. A practical result of his work on consumer preference theory were proposals in the 1989s for the construction of cost-of-living indexes.

After 18 years in Texas, Basmann moved to the State University of New York at Binghamton, where he became a litigation consultant with expertise in applied statistics and microeconomics. He is credited for preparing the winning statistical argument in trial of Oprah Winfrey against the cattle producers.

Basmann died at his home in Vestal, New York, on April 18, 2024, at the age of 98.
