= John Howard Dellinger =

American engineer

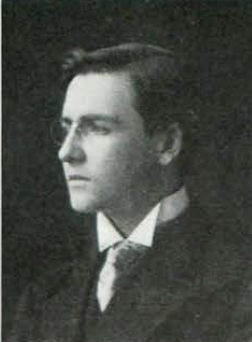
- Yearbook photo of Dellinger, circa 1908
- Born: July 3, 1886
- Died: December 28, 1962 (aged 76)
- Awards: IEEE Medal of Honor (1938)
- Scientific career
- Fields: Electrical engineering

John Howard Dellinger (July 3, 1886 – December 28, 1962) was a noted American telecommunication engineer who discovered how solar flares caused fadeouts of short-wave radios (the Dellinger effect).

Dellinger was born in Cleveland, Ohio, first attended the Western Reserve University, in 1908 received his A.B. degree from George Washington University, and in 1913 received his Ph.D. degree from Princeton University. From 1907-1948 Dellinger worked at the National Bureau of Standards as physicist; chief, radio section; and chief, Central Radio Propagation Laboratory. From 1928-1929 he served as chief engineer of the Federal Radio Commission, and also served as a representative of the United States Department of Commerce on the Radio Advisory Committee (1922–1948).

He was appointed vice-president of the International Scientific Radio Union in 1934, chairman of the Radio Technical Commission for Aeronautics in 1941, chairman of the Radio Technical Commission for Marine Services in 1947, and chairman of Study Group 6 on Radio Propagation of the International Radio Consultative Committee in 1950.

In 1932 Dellinger was awarded the Sc.D. degree from George Washington University, and in 1938 the IRE Medal of Honor "for his contributions to the development of radio measurements and standards, his researches and discoveries of the relation between radio wave propagation and other natural phenomena, and his leadership in international conferences contributing to the worldwide cooperation in telecommunications. The crater Dellinger on the Moon is named in his honor.
