= Marconi (crater) =

Crater on the Moon

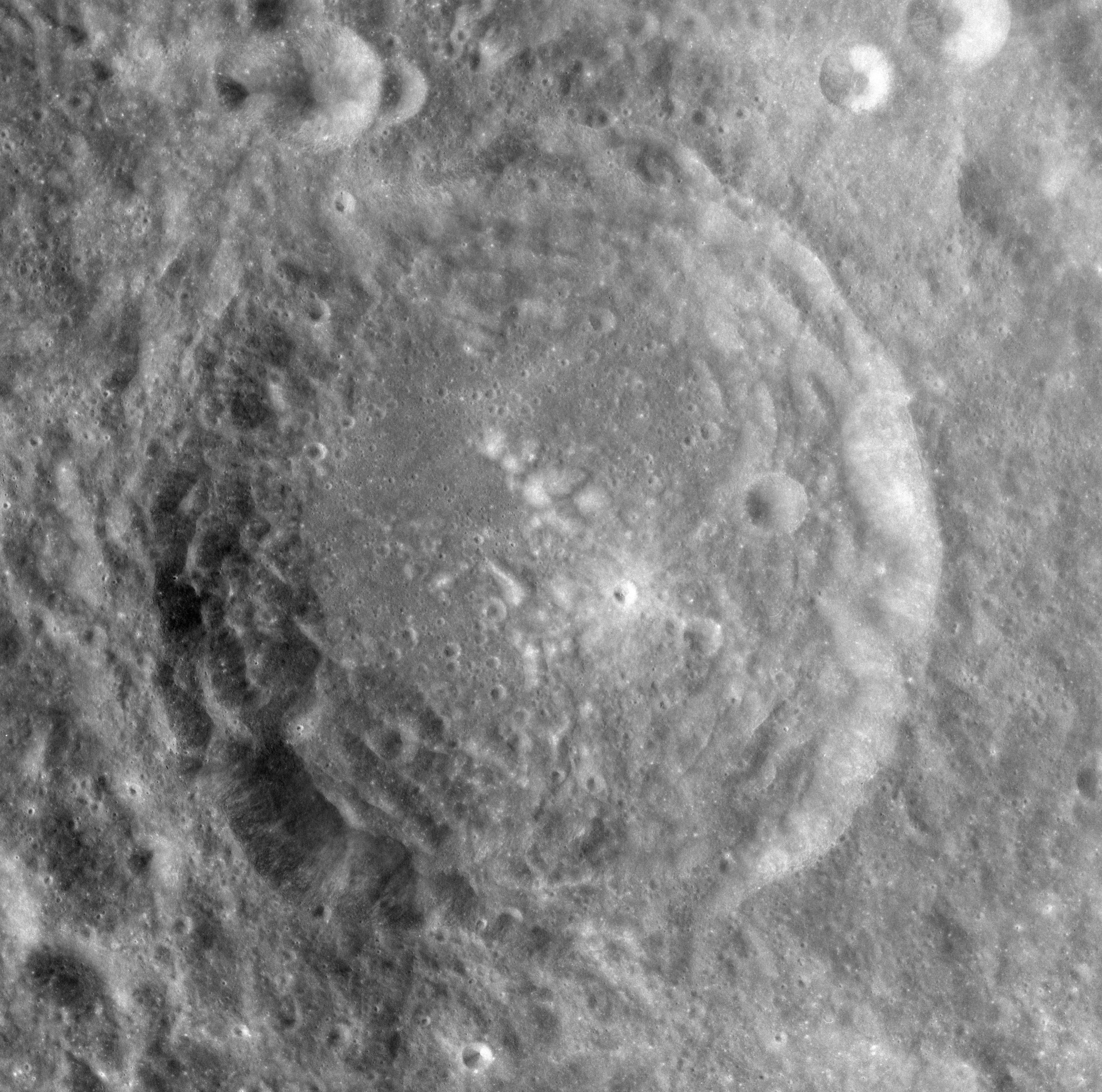
- Apollo 17 mapping camera image
- Coordinates: 9.48°S 145.20°E
- Diameter: 72.88 km
- Depth: Unknown
- Colongitude: 215° at sunrise
- Eponym: Guglielmo Marconi

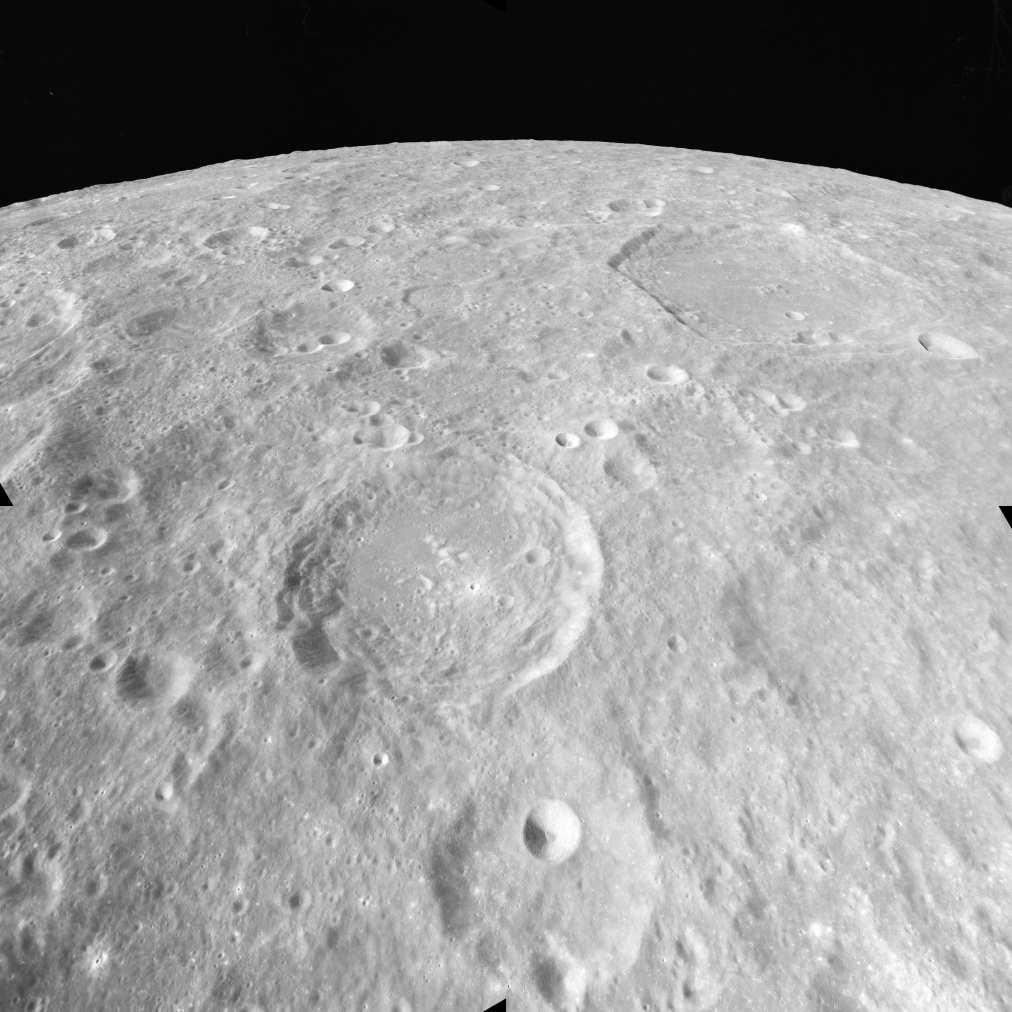
Regional view showing Marconi near center and Chaplygin in upper right.

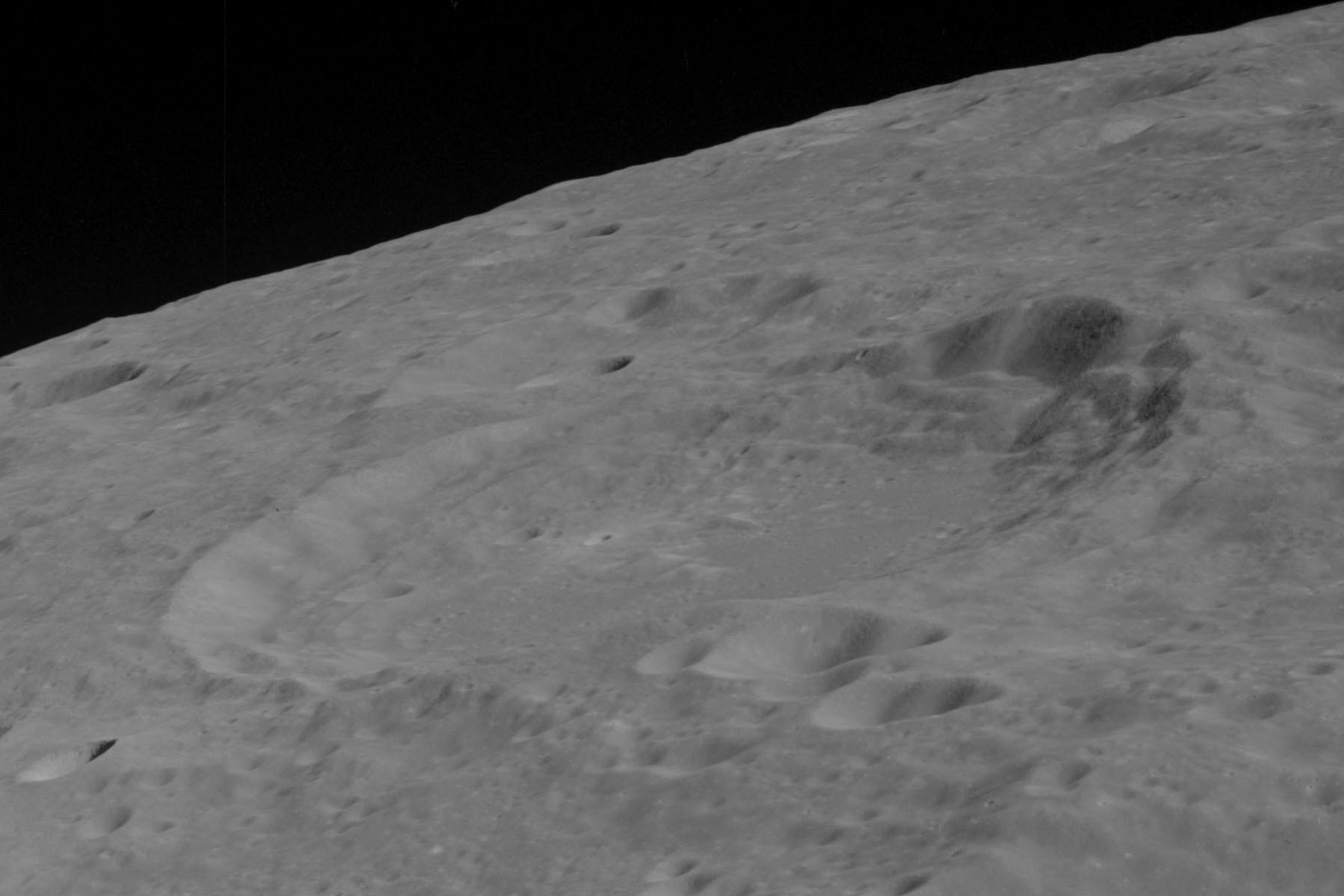
Oblique view from Apollo 10

Marconi is a lunar impact crater that is located on the Moon's far side. It lies to the northwest of the large walled plain named Gagarin, and to the southwest of the prominent crater Chaplygin. To the west-northwest of Marconi is the slightly larger Dellinger.

This is a well-formed crater with only some modest impact erosion that has softened the features. The outer rim is marked only by a few tiny craterlets and some terrace structures can still be seen along the inner walls. There is a pair of small craterlets along the inner wall to the south and east. Near the midpoint of the relatively level interior floor is a low central rise composed of several small hills. The floor is otherwise marked by a number of tiny craterlets.

The crater was named after Italian physicist, inventor, and Nobel laureate Guglielmo Marconi by the IAU in 1970. The crater was known as Crater 295 prior to naming.

== Satellite craters ==
By convention these features are identified on lunar maps by placing the letter on the side of the crater midpoint that is closest to Marconi.

Marconi	Latitude	Longitude	Diameter
C	8.4° S	146.8° E	9 km
H	11.0° S	147.5° E	41 km
L	11.7° S	145.3° E	38 km
S	10.0° S	143.1° E	14 km

== See also ==
- 1332 Marconia, asteroid
