= Dellinger (crater) =

Crater on the Moon

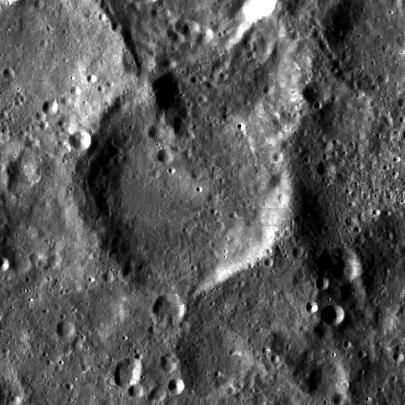
- LROC image
- Coordinates: 6.8°S 140.6°E
- Diameter: 82.04 km (50.98 mi)
- Depth: Unknown
- Colongitude: 220° at sunrise
- Eponym: John H. Dellinger

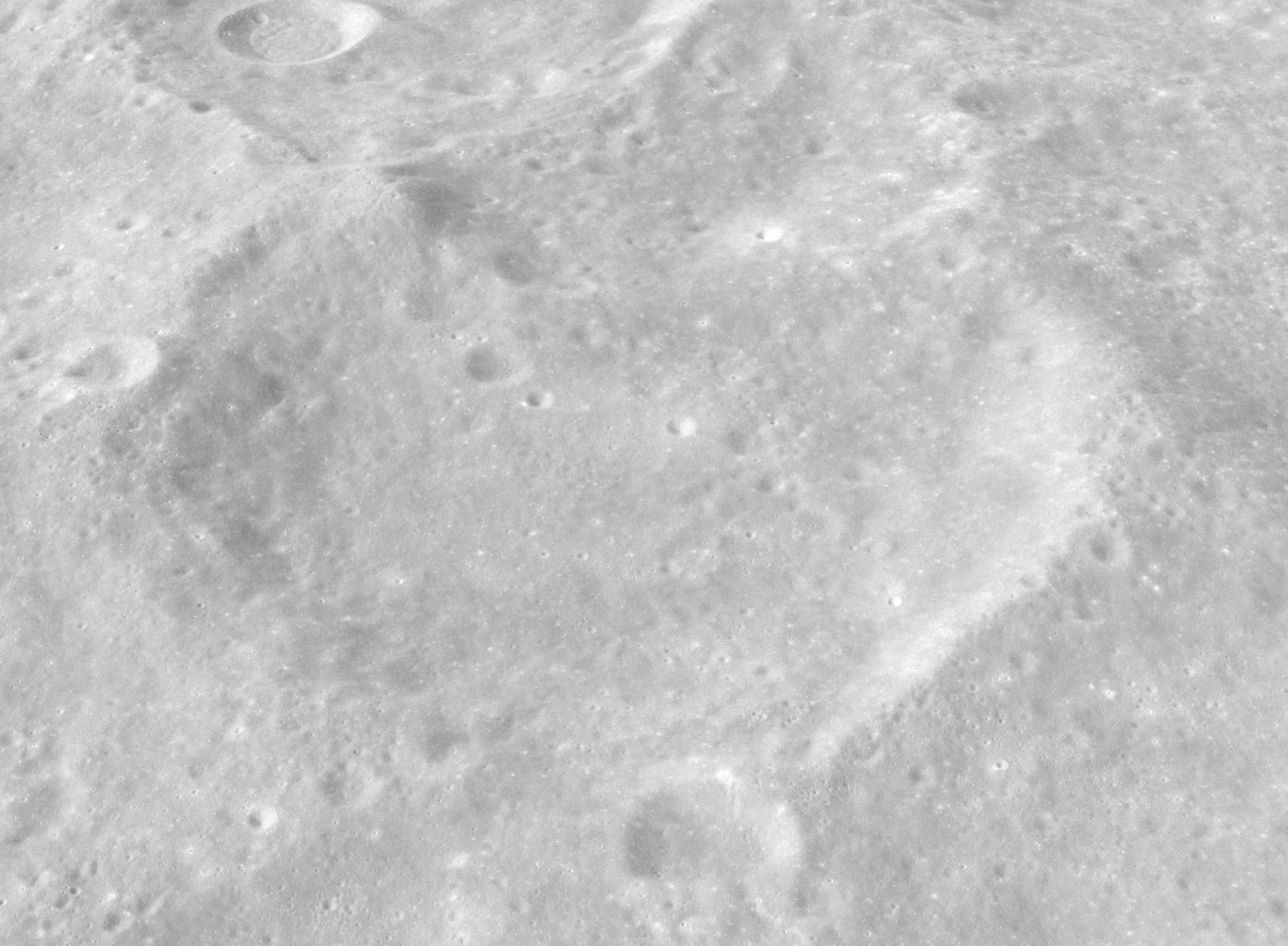
Oblique Apollo 17 mapping camera image, facing north

Dellinger is a degraded lunar impact crater that is located on the Moon's far side. It is attached to the southern rim of the crater Pannekoek. To the southeast lies the crater Marconi, and to the southwest is Chauvenet.

The outer rim of this crater is significantly eroded in places, including an outward protrusion along the southern rim and particularly along the northern half. The Dellinger B formation lies across the rims of Dellinger and Pannekoek, creating an open passage between the two. There is a pair of small craters on the northwestern part of the interior floor.

The crater was named after American physicist John Howard Dellinger (1886–1962). Its designation was formally adopted by the IAU in 1970. The crater was known as Crater 293 prior to naming.

== Satellite craters ==
By convention these features are identified on lunar maps by placing the letter on the side of the crater midpoint that is closest to Dellinger.

Dellinger	Latitude	Longitude	Diameter
B	5.5° S	141.1° E	53 km
U	6.3° S	136.8° E	16 km
