= Chaplygin (crater) =

Lunar impact crater

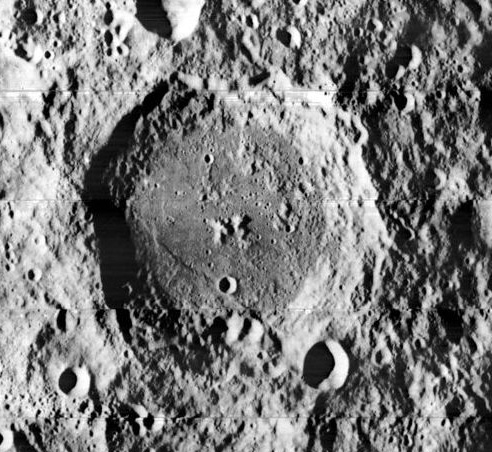
- Lunar Orbiter 1 image
- Coordinates: 5.76°S 150.24°E
- Diameter: 123.39 km (76.67 mi)
- Depth: Unknown
- Colongitude: 212° at sunrise
- Formation: Nectarian
- Eponym: Sergey Chaplygin

Chaplygin is a large lunar impact crater that lies in the highlands on the far side of the Moon. Located within the proposed Chaplygin-Mandel’shtam Basin, it lies to the southeast of a huge walled plain named Mendeleev, about midway between the craters Schliemann to the northeast and Marconi to the southwest. It is about the same size as Albategnius on the near side.

On the lunar geologic timescale, Chaplygin is one of the largest craters of Nectarian age. Its formation occurred in the ferromagnetic ejecta of the South Pole-Aitken basin, but the impact appears to have demagnetized the crater interior. Despite this, the crater shows a similar iron abundance to its surroundings.

The rim of Chaplygin crater is roughly circular, but the edge is uneven. The inner wall is terraced around much of the circumference, and this structure is somewhat disrupted along the southern side. The rim is only mildly eroded, with few craters around the edge — the exception being Chaplygin K which is intruding into the inner wall along the southeast side. Within the walls is an interior plain that is level and smooth in comparison to the rugged terrain that surrounds the exterior of the crater. There is a central peak near the midpoint, and a few tiny craters lie scattered across the surface.

The crater is named after Soviet mathematician and engineer Sergey Chaplygin (1869–1942). Its designation was formally adopted by the International Astronomical Union in 1970. The crater was identified as Crater 297 prior to naming.

== Satellite craters ==
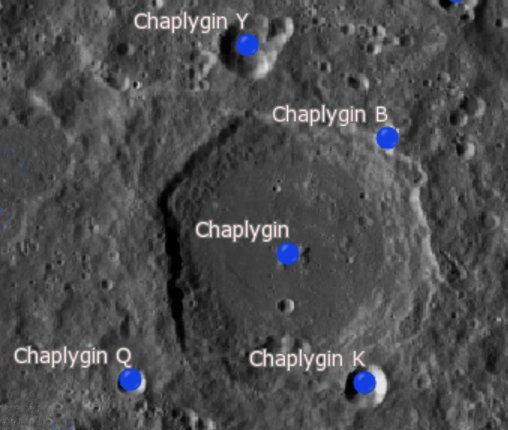
Satellite features of Chaplygin

By convention these features are identified on lunar maps by placing the letter on the side of the crater midpoint that is closest to Chaplygin.

Chaplygin	Coordinates	Diameter, km
B	4.08°S 151.69°E	1.5
K	7.68°S 151.36°E	20
Q	7.64°S 147.91°E	13
Y	2.71°S 149.64°E	28

A small, bright crater named Chaplygin B, lies on the northeastern rim of Chaplygin and displays a ray system. It was nicknamed Chappy by the LROC team.

== Gallery ==
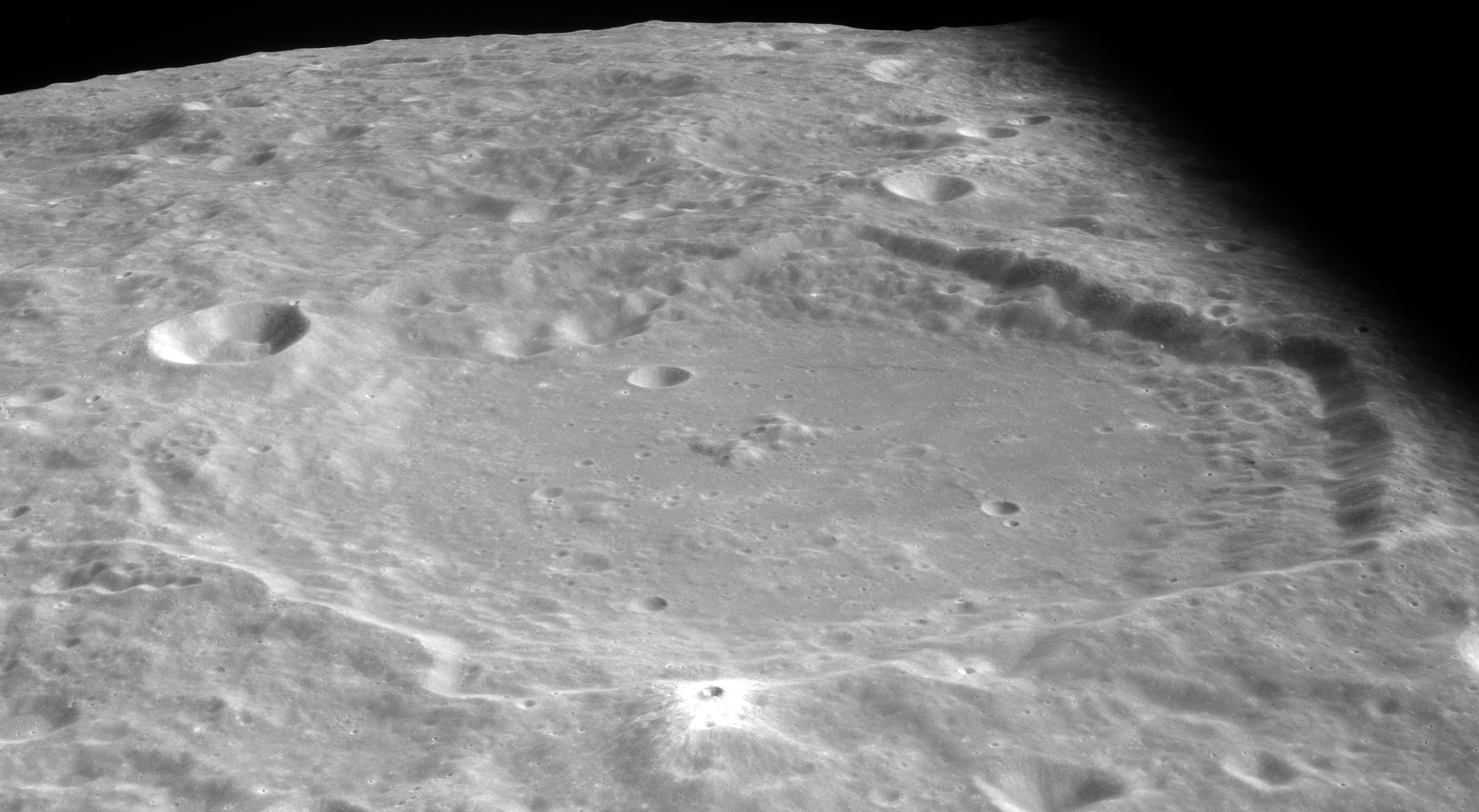
Oblique photo of Chaplygin from Apollo 11, facing south

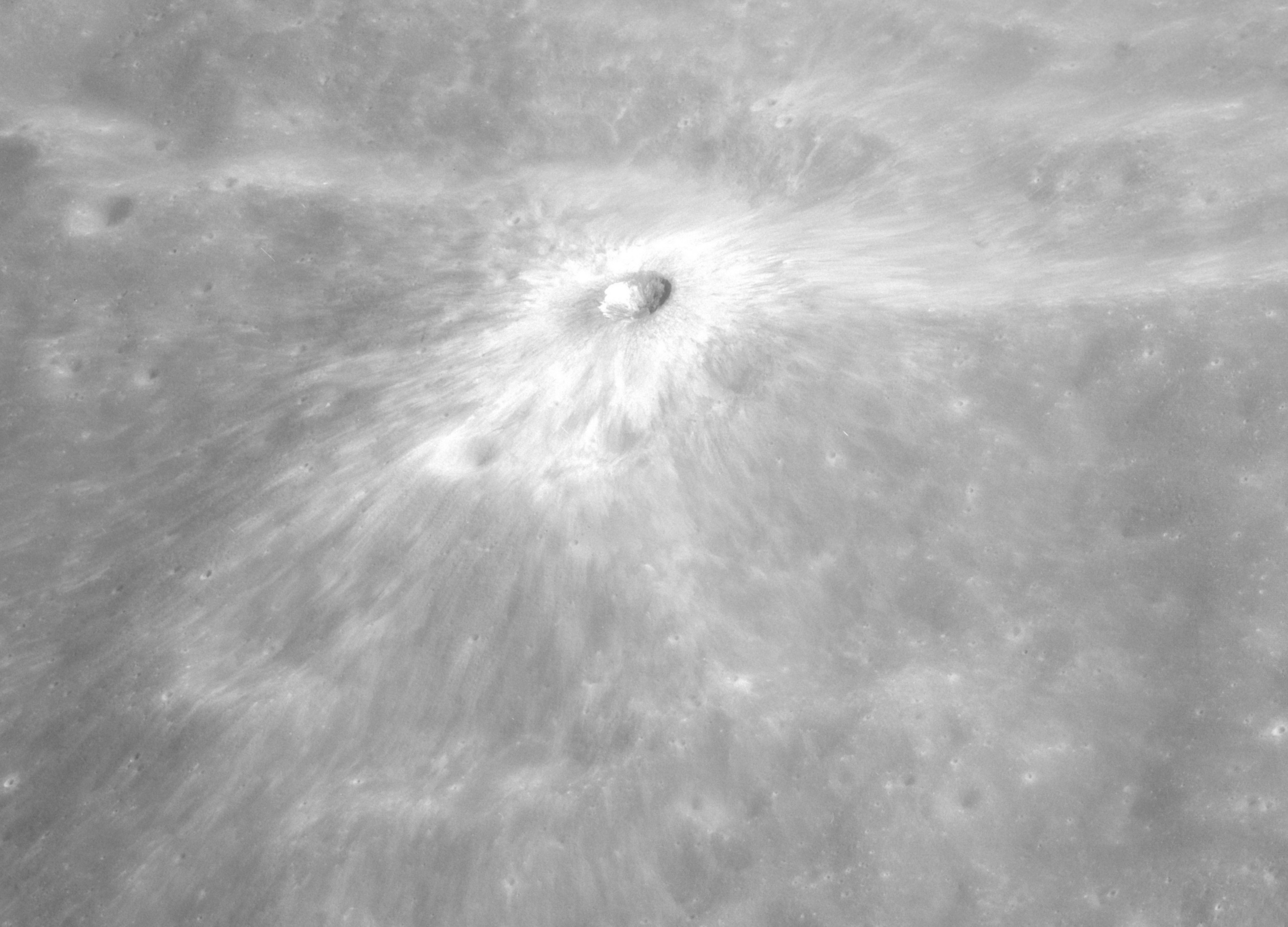
Oblique photo of a small, young crater Chaplygin B (Chappy) with a bright ray system on the north edge of Chaplygin, from Apollo 11, facing south

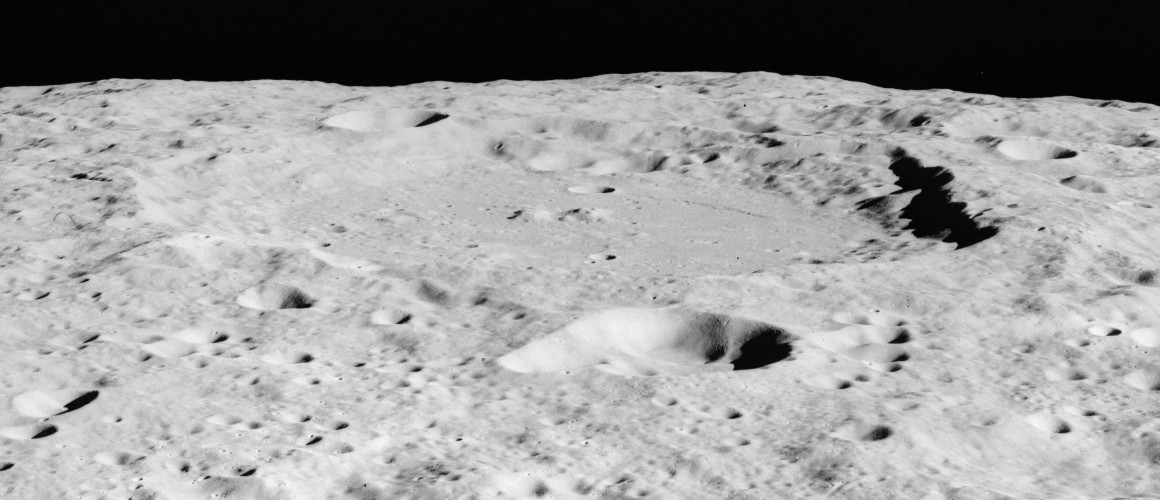
Highly oblique photo of Chaplygin from Apollo 16, facing south
