= Carl Schultze Theater =

Theatre in St. Pauli, Hamburg, Germany

Coordinates: 53.54969°N 9.9592°E

Carl-Schultze-Theater was a theatre in St. Pauli, Hamburg, Germany. It was originally founded in the late 19th century by Carl Schultze.
