= Green (lunar crater) =

Lunar impact crater

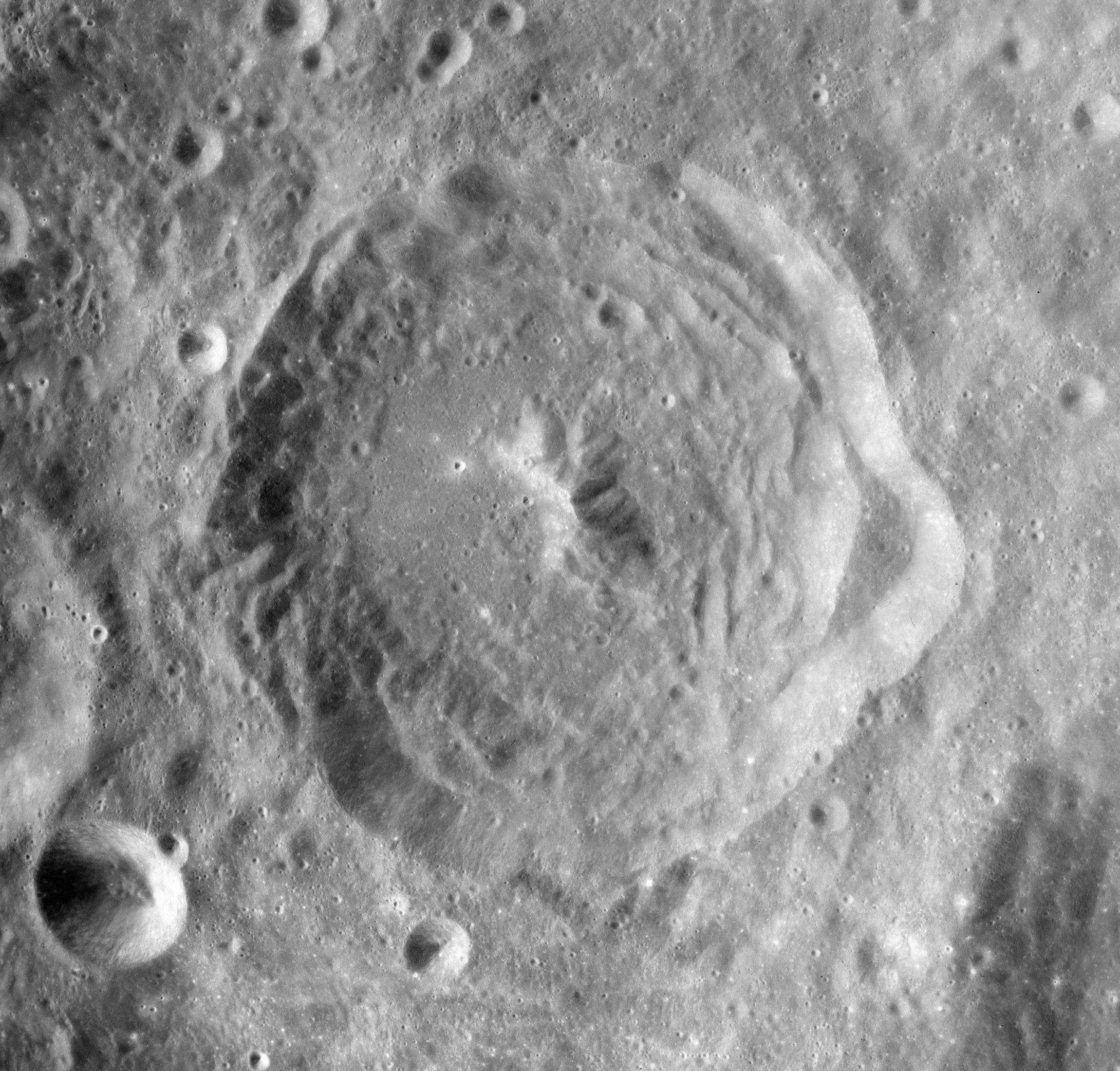
- Lunar crater Green from Apollo 16. NASA photo.
- Coordinates: 4.1°N 132.9°E
- Diameter: 65 km
- Colongitude: 228° at sunrise
- Eponym: George Green

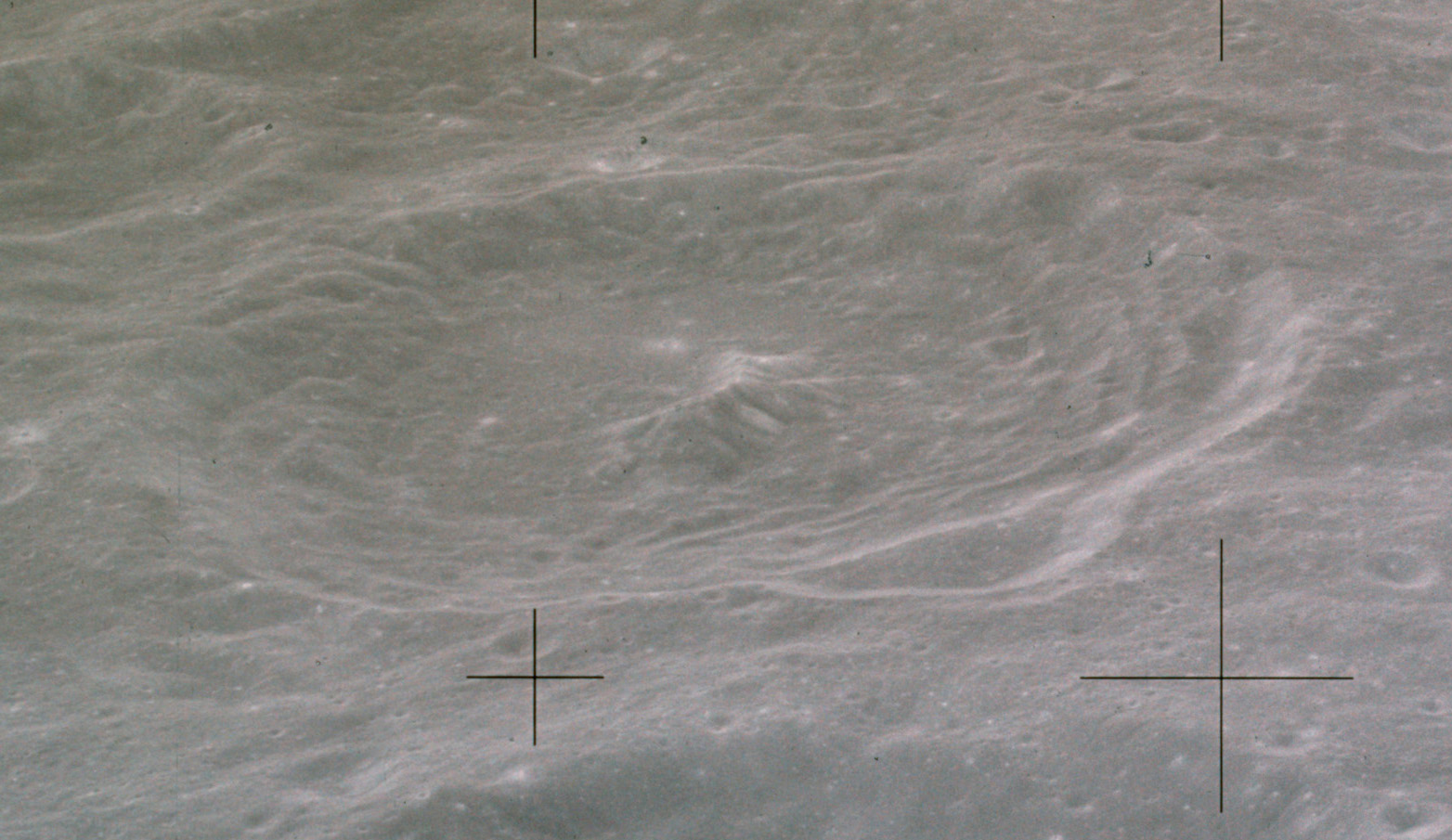
Oblique view from Apollo 11, mainly showing differences in color resulting from albedo, rather than color differences from sun angle

Green is a lunar impact crater on the Moon's far side. It was named after British mathematician and physicist George Green in 1970. Prior to that, it was designated Crater 216. It lies just to the west of the huge walled plain named Mendeleev, and is nearly joined with the west-northwestern edge of the crater Hartmann.

The crater has not been significantly eroded although a few tiny craterlets lie along the edge and inner wall. The perimeter is nearly circular, but has an outward bulge along the eastern side with some indications of a landslip. The inner sides display some terrace structures, particularly to the northeast. At the midpoint of the relatively level interior floor is a central ridge. The floor is more level along the western half, with some low rises in the east. There are only a few tiny craterlets on the interior.

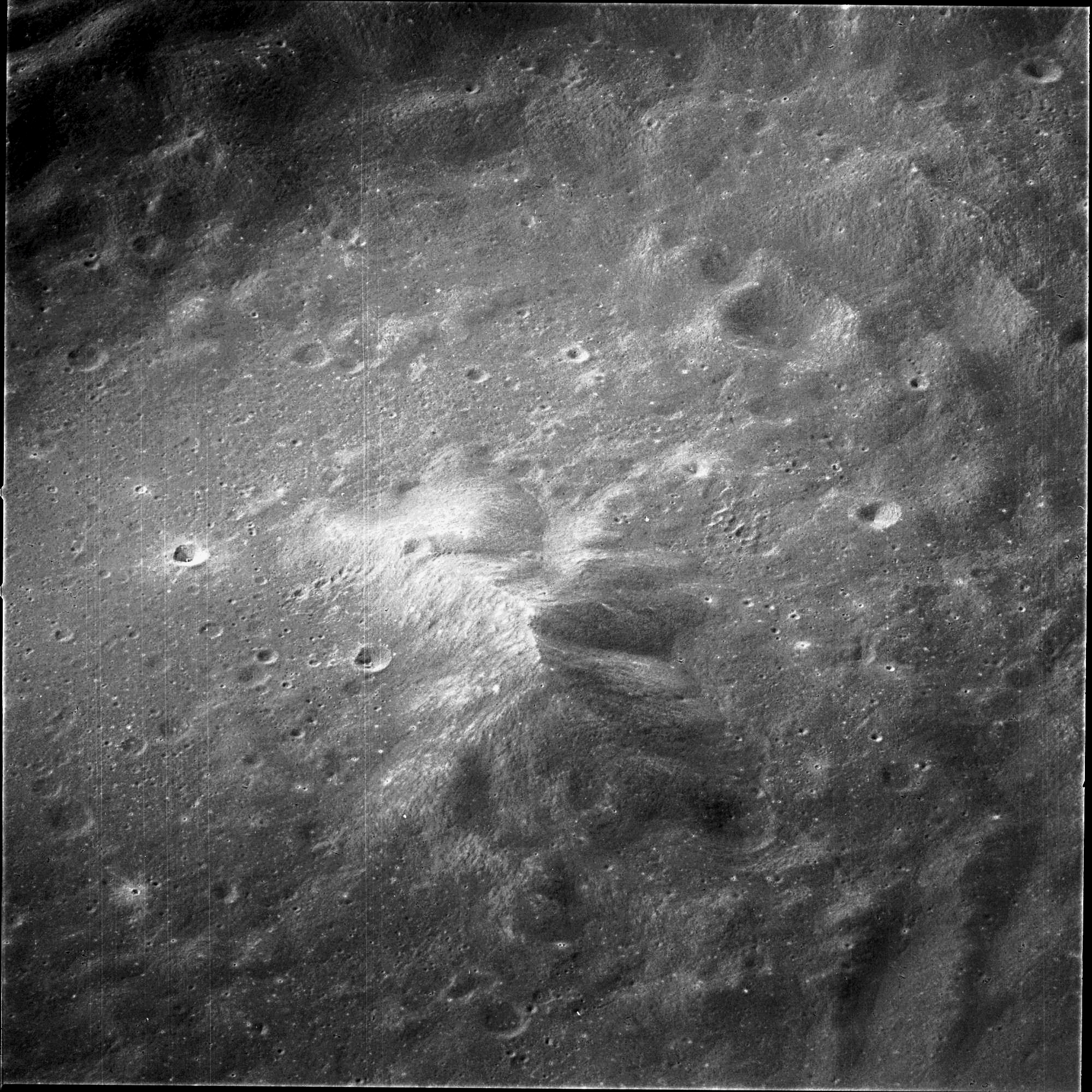
Oblique view of the central peak from Apollo 10

== Satellite craters ==
By convention these features are identified on lunar maps by placing the letter on the side of the crater midpoint that is closest to Green.

Green	Latitude	Longitude	Diameter
M	0.9° N	132.9° E	37 km
P	1.0° N	131.8° E	21 km
Q	2.8° N	131.7° E	16 km
R	3.4° N	131.0° E	33 km

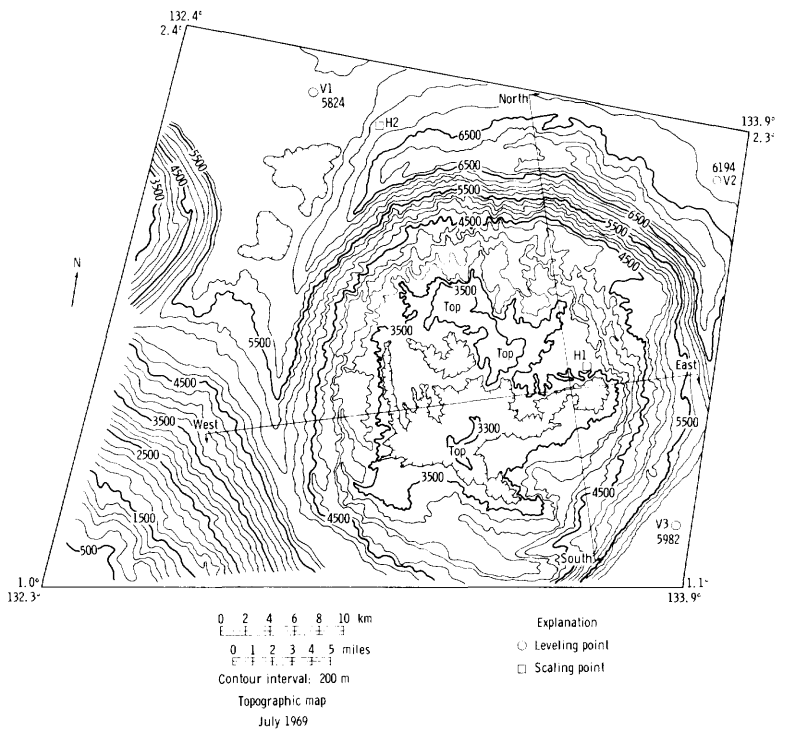
Topographic map of Green M crater based on Apollo 10 photography

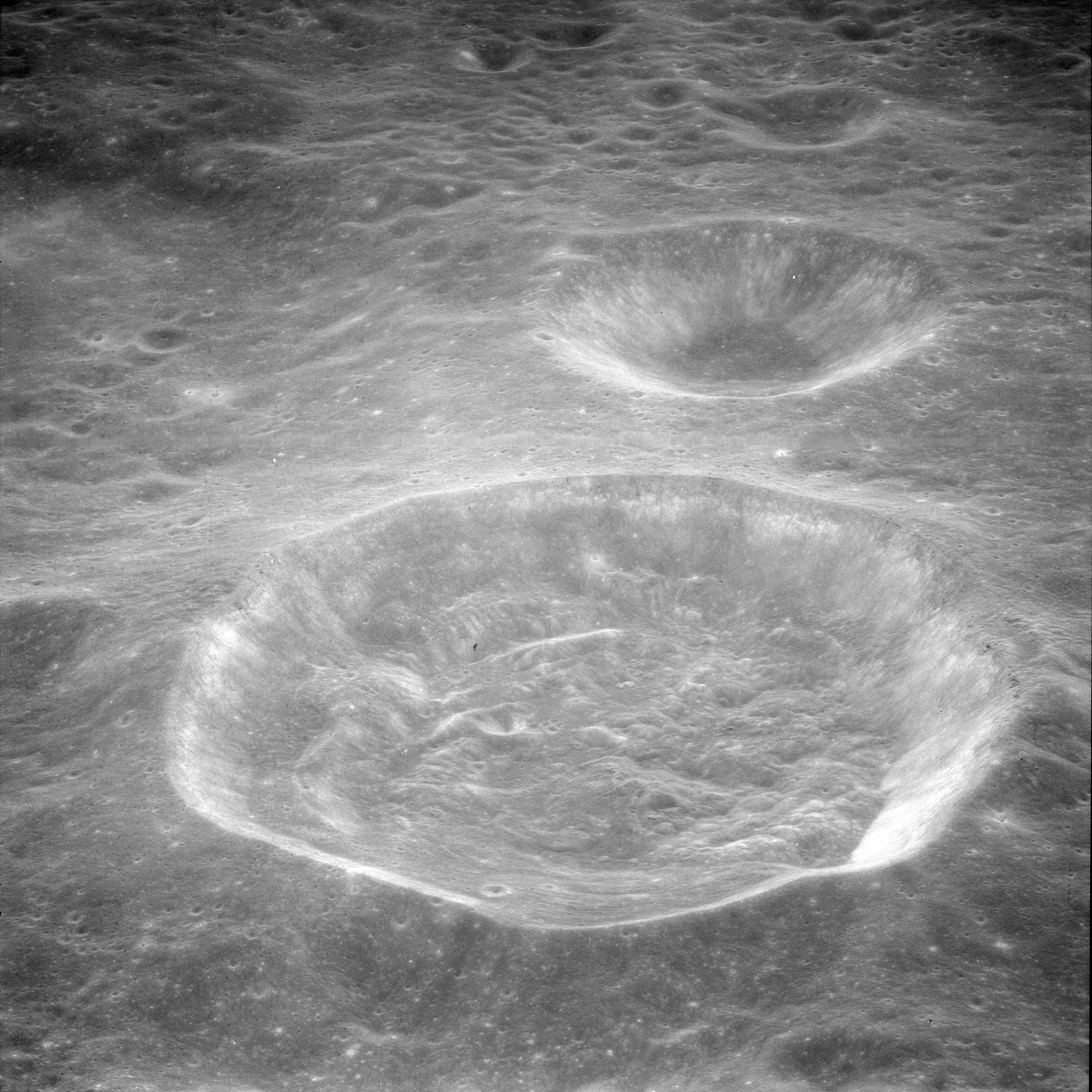
Green M crater from Apollo 11

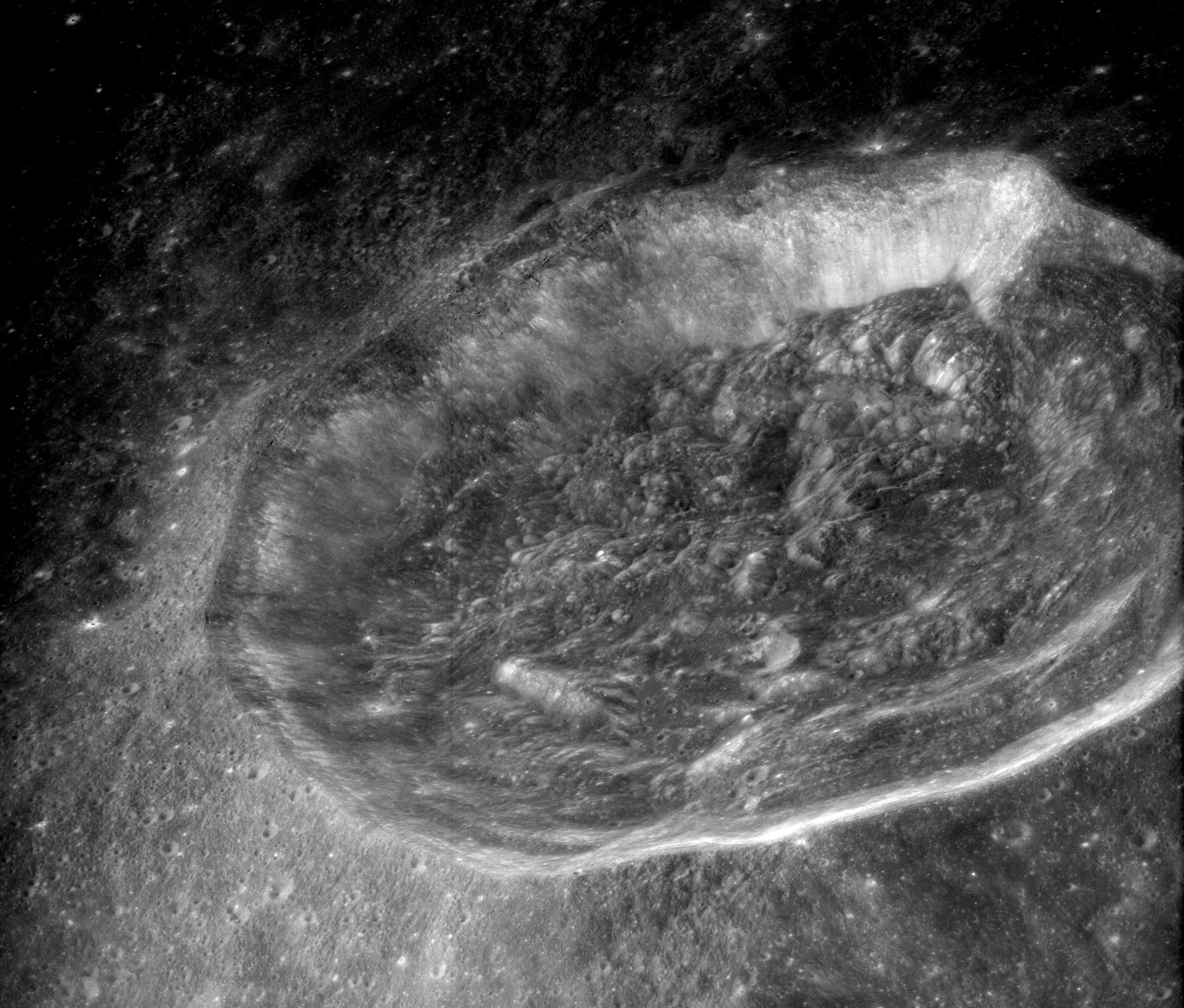
Green M from Apollo 17

Green M crater has a ray system and is consequently mapped as part of the Copernican system. Green M was well studied from Apollo 10 photographs.
