= Mills (crater) =

Crater on the Moon

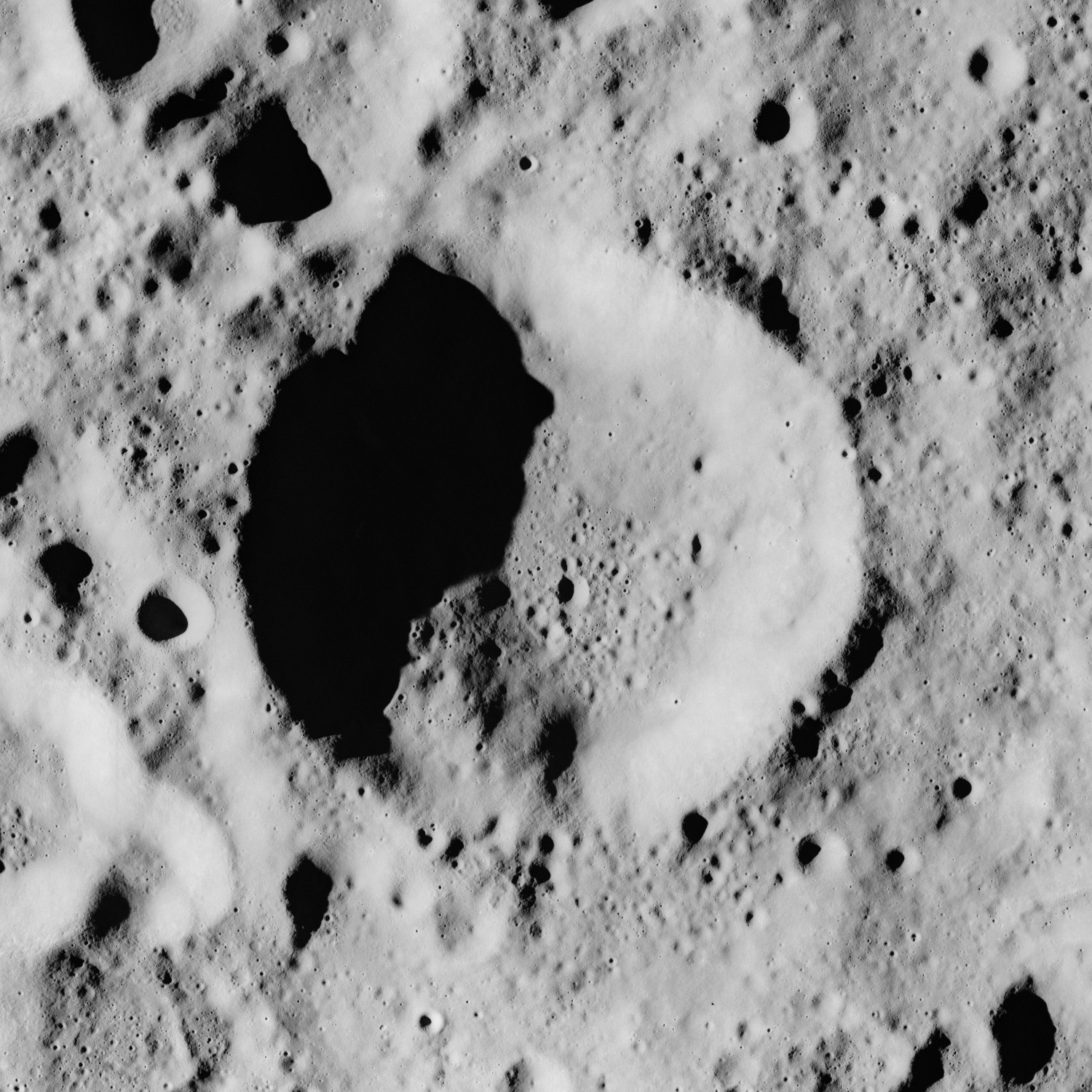
- Apollo 16 image
- Coordinates: 8.6°N 156.0°E
- Diameter: 32 km
- Colongitude: 204° at sunrise
- Eponym: Mark M. Mills

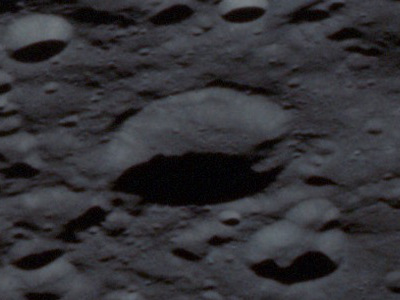
Oblique Apollo 13 image, facing east

Mills is a small crater that lies on the far side of the Moon. It is located to the northeast of Henderson and to the south of Kohlschütter.

This is an undistinguished impact crater that is roughly circular in form, with a slight outward bulge to the northwest. This bulge may be due to the merger of a smaller impact with the rim. The rim edge is somewhat worn, with indistinct features and a few tiny craterlets along the edge. The interior floor has a ridge of material protruding inwards from the southern inner wall, but is otherwise marked only by a number of tiny craters.

== Satellite craters ==
By convention these features are identified on lunar maps by placing the letter on the side of the crater midpoint that is closest to Mills.

Mills	Latitude	Longitude	Diameter
B	10.7° N	156.9° E	24 km
C	9.8° N	157.3° E	14 km
K	6.8° N	157.0° E	26 km
R	8.1° N	154.8° E	19 km
W	10.0° N	154.2° E	18 km
