= Harden (crater) =

Lunar impact crater

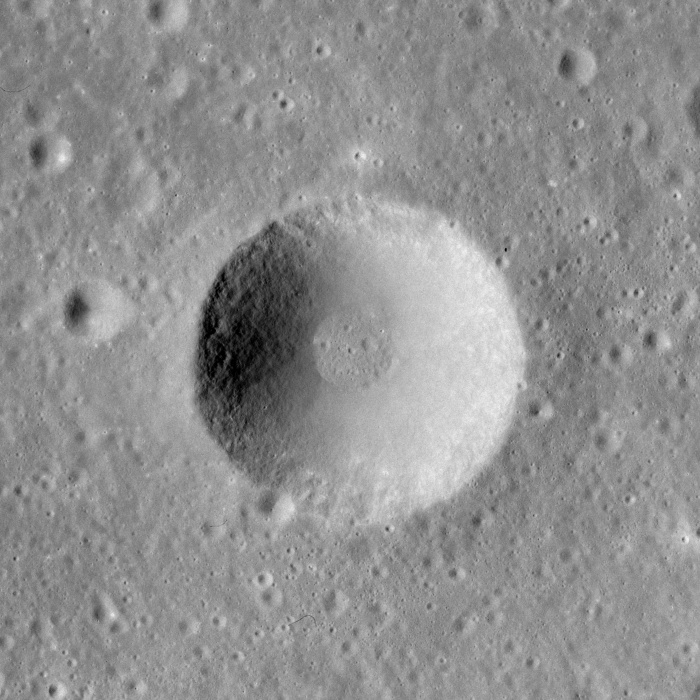
- Apollo 16 image
- Coordinates: 5.5°N 143.5°E
- Diameter: 15 km
- Depth: 2.14 km
- Colongitude: 217° at sunrise
- Eponym: Arthur Harden

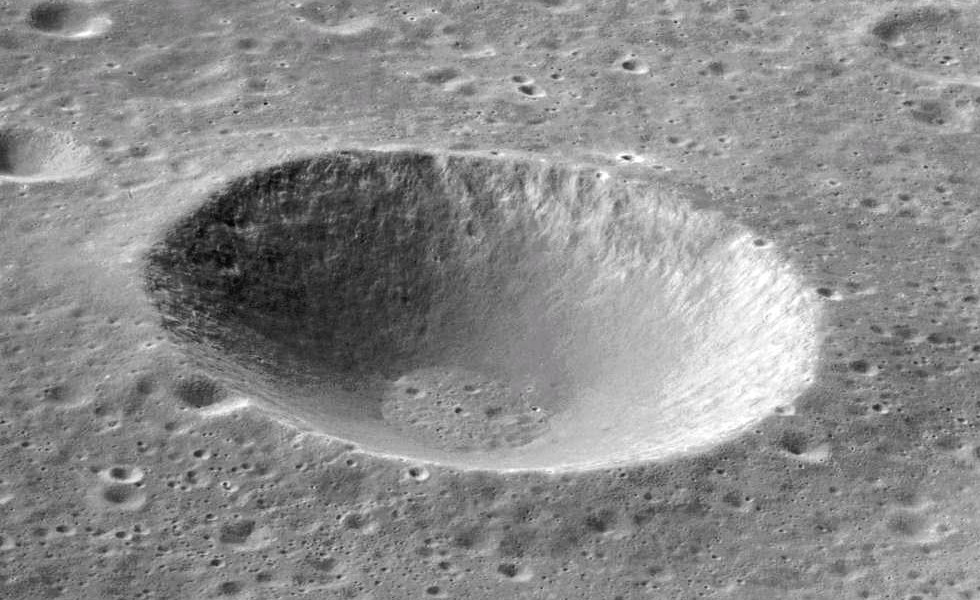
Apollo 10 image

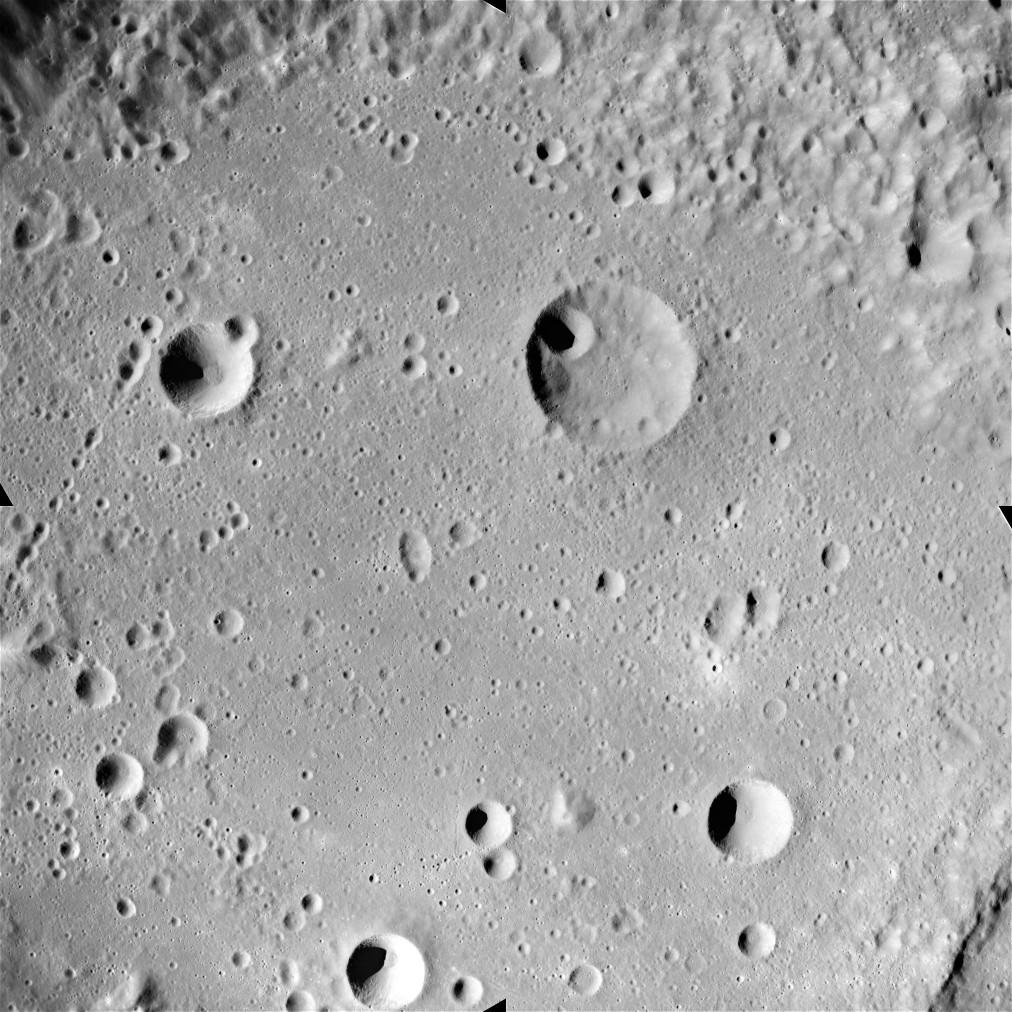
Apollo 16 image of interior of Mendeleev. Harden is in lower right. Benedict is along bottom edge. Fischer is above center, and Richards is in upper left.

Harden is a small lunar impact crater that lies in the eastern part of the interior floor of the walled plain named Mendeleev. It is located on the far side of the Moon, and cannot be seen from the Earth.

The crater is a circular, bowl-shaped feature with a slightly higher albedo than the surrounding terrain, but lacks the skirt of bright ejecta that many young impacts possess. The edge and interior are not notably eroded, and no significant craters overlie this feature. To the southeast of this crater, overlying the rim of Mendeleev, is the large Schuster.
