= Bergman (crater) =

Lunar impact crater

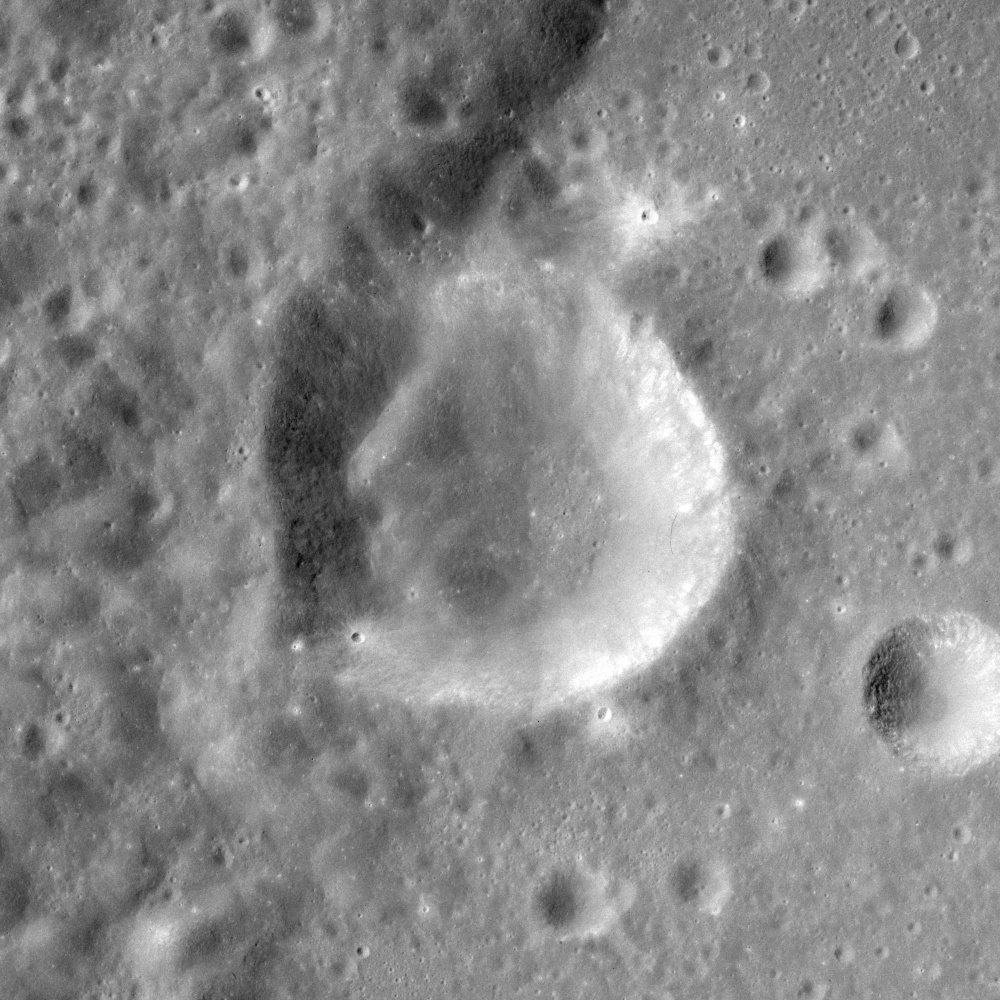
- Apollo 16 image
- Coordinates: 7.0°N 137.5°E
- Diameter: 22.51 km (13.99 mi)
- Depth: 1.35 km (0.84 mi)
- Colongitude: 223° at sunrise
- Eponym: Torbern O. Bergman

Bergman is a small lunar impact crater that is located on the far side of the Moon. It is positioned on the interior floor of the 313 km diameter walled plain Mendeleev, and is attached to the edge of the inner wall to the northwest. On the same walled basin are the craters Moissan to the south and Richards to the east.

The rim of Bergman is roughly circular, and the formation is generally bowl-shaped. The western half of the interior floor is covered with a slope of scree, leaving a small level floor on the eastern side. The infrared spectrum of pure crystalline plagioclase has been identified on the southeast wall.

This crater was named after Swedish astronomer Torbern O. Bergman (1735-1784). Its designation was officially adopted by the International Astronomical Union in 1976.
