= Benedict (crater) =

Crater on the Moon

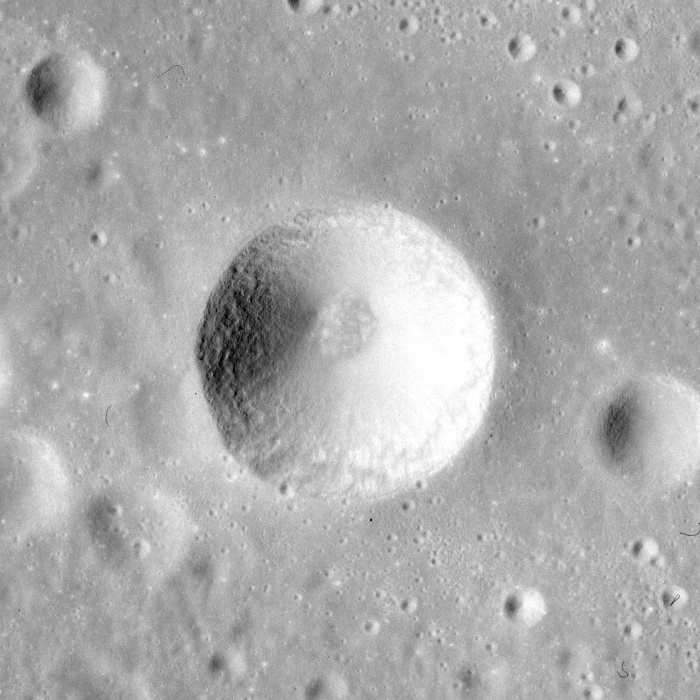
- Apollo 16 image
- Coordinates: 4.4°N 141.5°E
- Diameter: 13.83 km (8.59 mi)
- Depth: 3.1 km
- Colongitude: 219° at sunrise
- Eponym: Francis G. Benedict

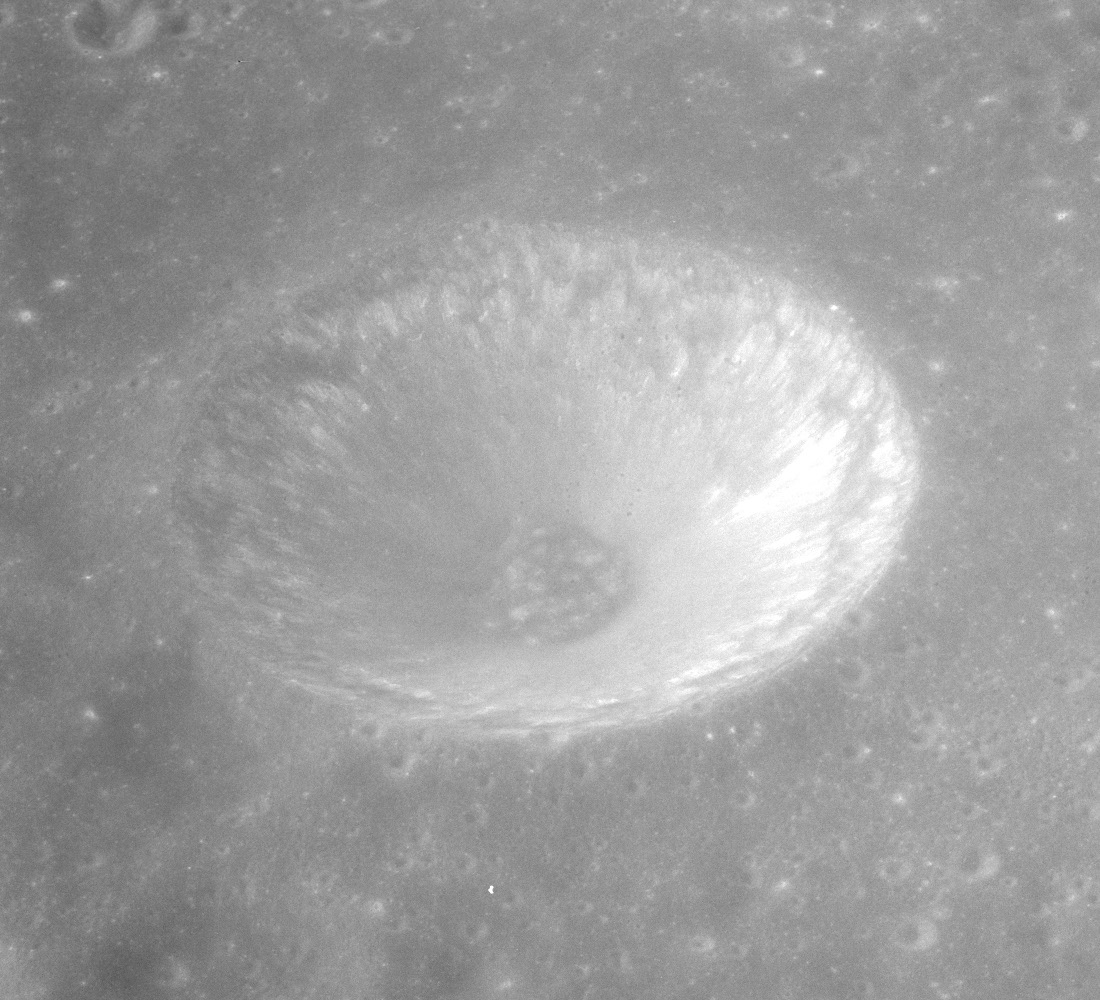
Oblique view from Apollo 11

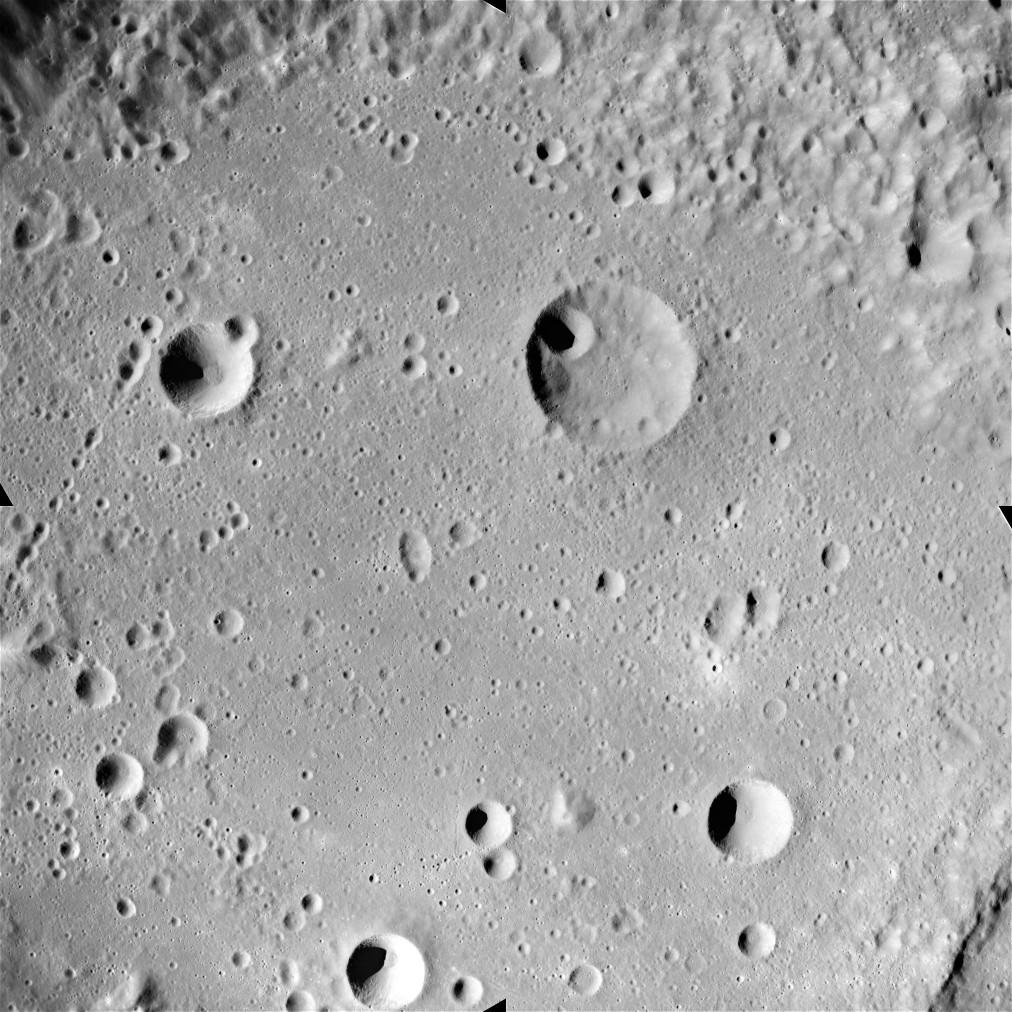
Apollo 16 image of interior of Mendeleev. Benedict is along bottom edge. Fischer is above center, and Richards is in upper left. Harden is in lower right.

Benedict is a small, bowl-shaped crater that lies on the floor of the walled basin Mendeleev, on or near the peak ring. It is located near the lunar equator on the far side of the Moon from the Earth.

This crater is circular in shape, with little appearance of wear. At the midpoint of the sloping inner walls is a small central floor. The higher albedo of the inner walls, compared to the surrounding terrain, indicates that this is a relatively young formation. The infrared spectrum of pure crystalline plagioclase has been identified on the east, southeast, southwest, and northwest walls.

This crater is named after American chemist and physiologist Francis G. Benedict (1870–1957). Its designation was formally adopted by the International Astronomical Union in 1976.
