= Richards (lunar crater) =

Crater on the Moon

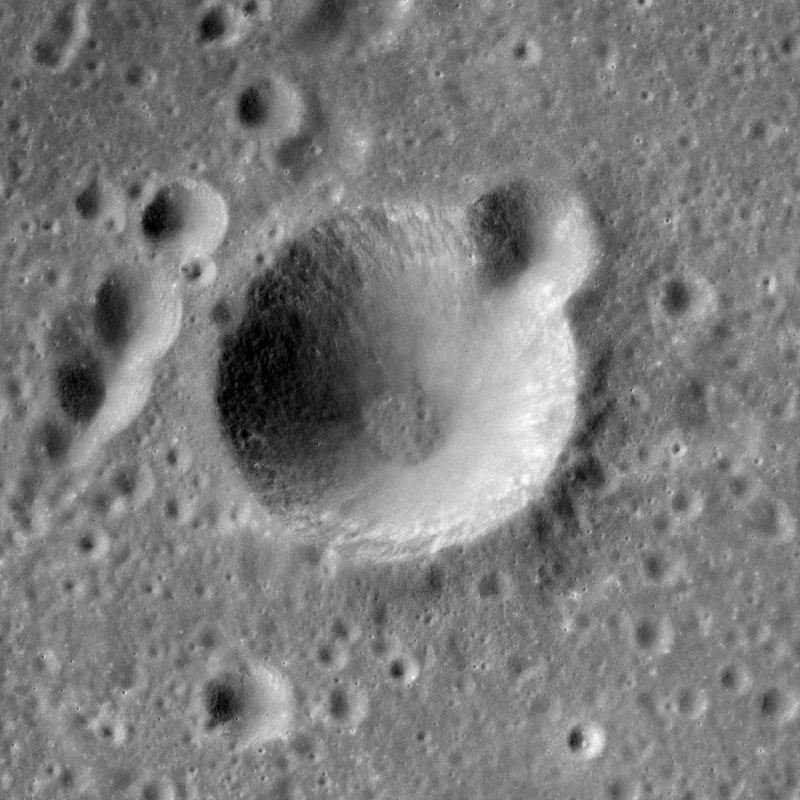
- Apollo 16 image
- Coordinates: 7.7°N 140.1°E
- Diameter: 16 km
- Depth: Unknown
- Colongitude: 220° at sunrise
- Eponym: Theodore W. Richards

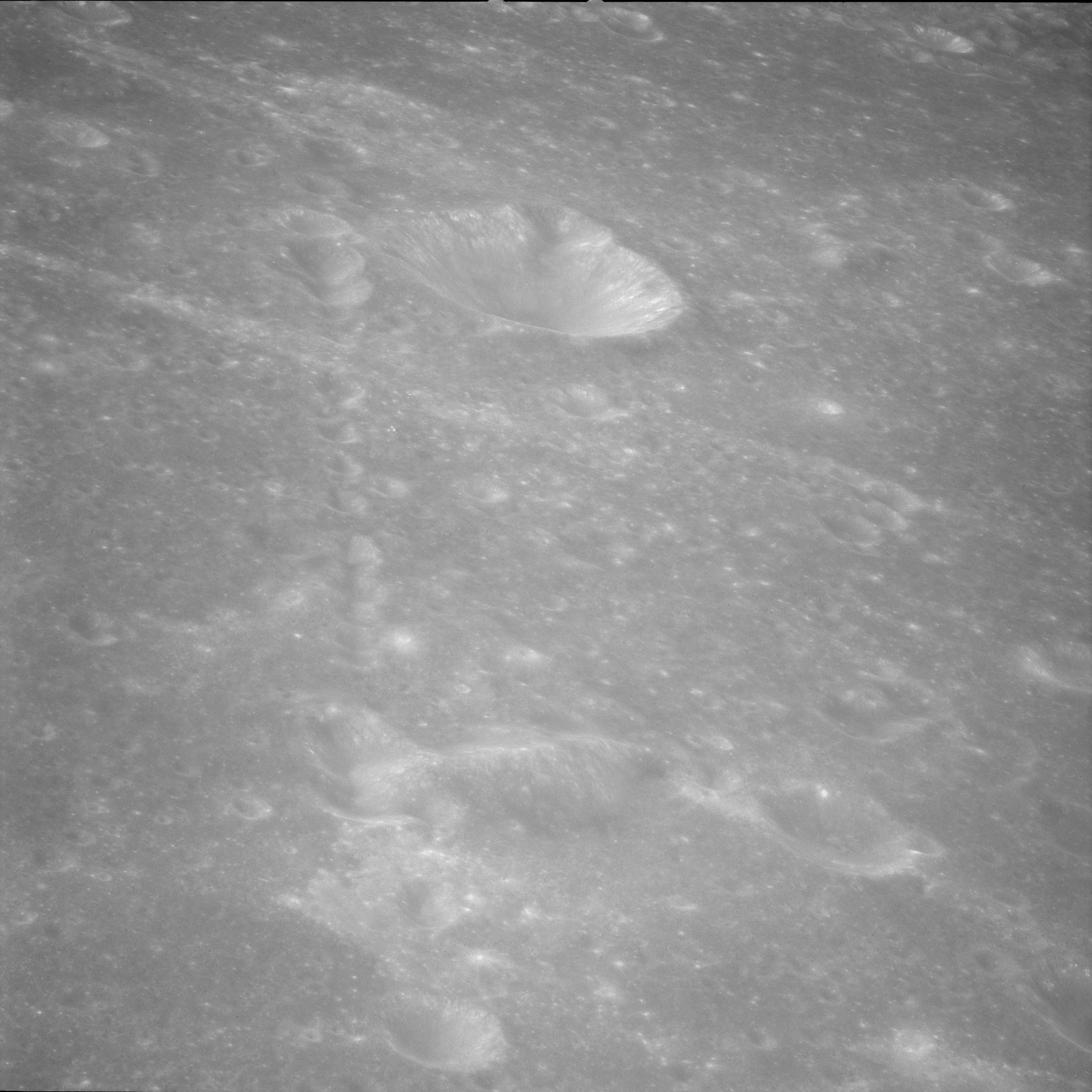
Oblique view of Catena Mendeleev from Apollo 11, with Richards at the top center. NASA photo.

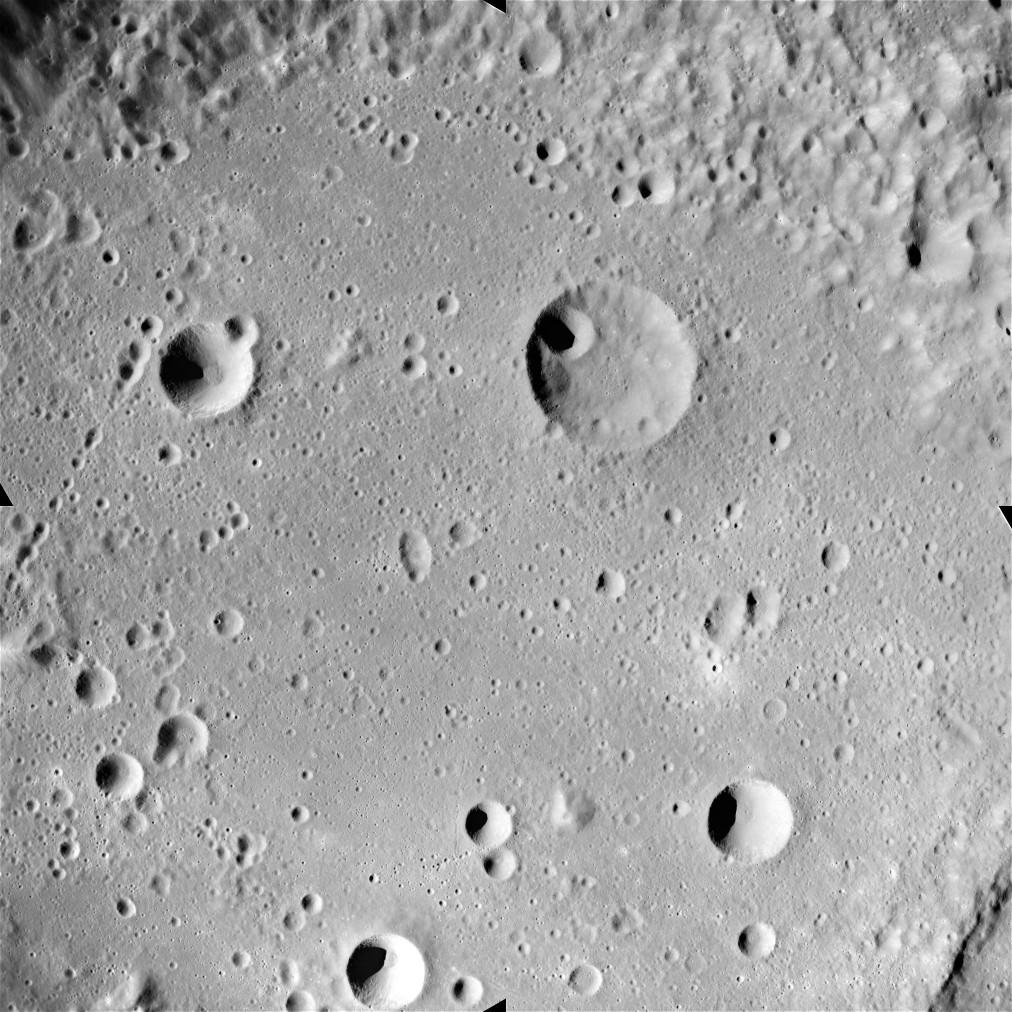
Apollo 16 image of interior of Mendeleev. Fischer is above center, and Richards is in upper left. Harden is in lower right. Benedict is along bottom edge.

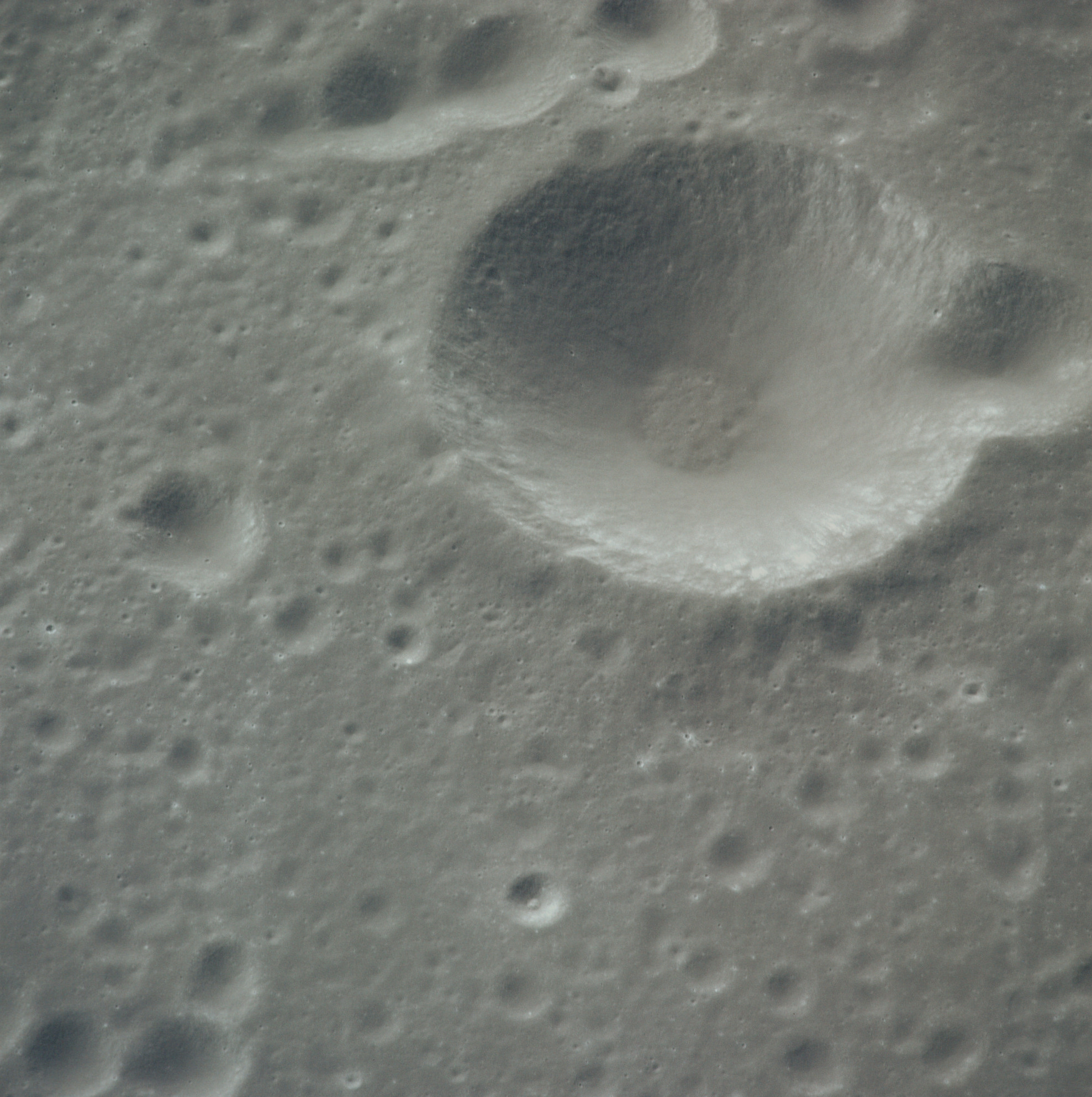
Oblique view also from Apollo 16

Richards is a small lunar impact crater that is located in the northern interior of the walled plain named Mendeleev, on the far side of the Moon. It lies about half-way between the craters Bergman to the west-southwest and Fischer to the east, both also within Mendeleev's interior.

This is a circular, cup-shaped crater with a small interior floor at the midpoint of the sloping inner walls. The interior sides have a higher albedo than the surroundings. The infrared spectrum of pure crystalline plagioclase has been identified inside the crater walls and on the rim. There is a small crater situated along the north-northeastern edge of the rim. The crater chain named Catena Mendeleev passes just to the west of Richards, continuing in a line of small craters from the southwestern edge of Mendeleev.
