= Francis Gano Benedict =

American chemist, physiologist, and nutritionist

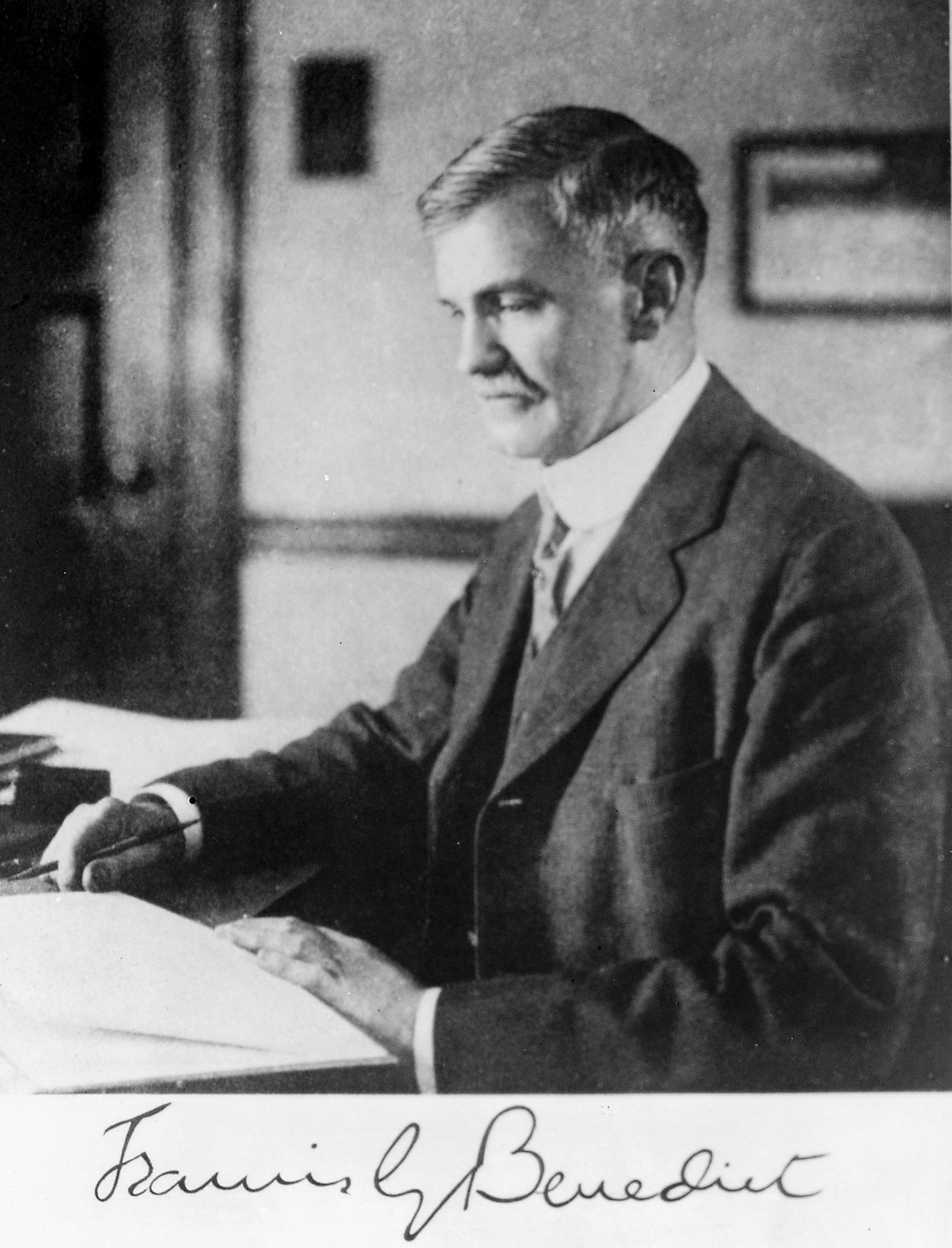
Francis Gano Benedict

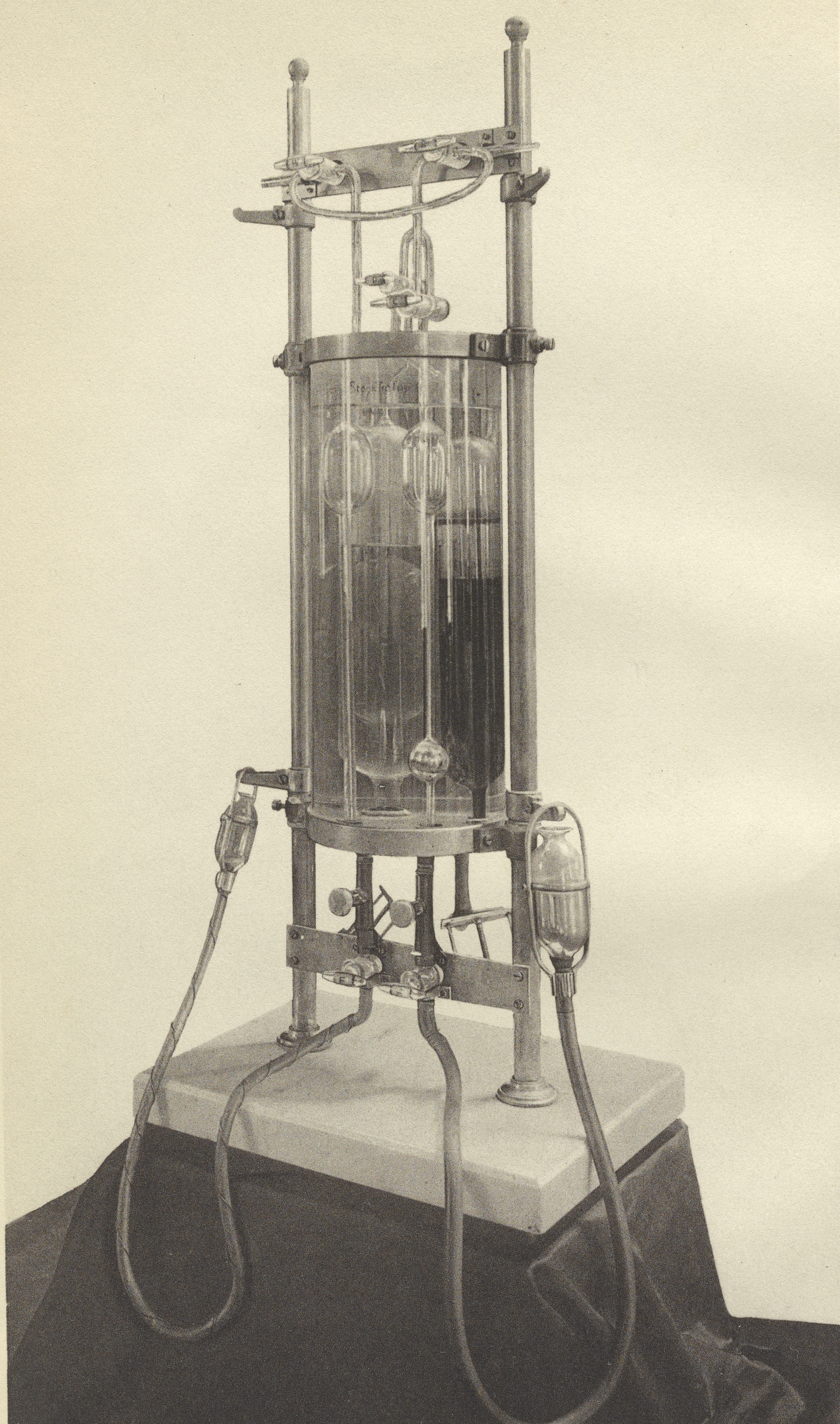
"Apparatus for Analysis of Atmospheric Air, Devised by Dr. Klas Sondén", frontispiece, The Composition of the Atmosphere with Special Reference to its Oxygen Content (1912)

Francis Gano Benedict (October 3, 1870 – April 14, 1957) was an American chemist, physiologist, and nutritionist who developed a calorimeter and a spirometer used to determine oxygen consumption and measure metabolic rate.

== Biography ==
Born in Milwaukee, Wisconsin, Benedict attended Harvard University, earning his bachelor's degree in 1893 and his master's degree in 1894. He earned his Ph.D., magna cum laude, at Heidelberg University in 1895. He taught at Wesleyan University and did work for the U.S. Department of Agriculture. He was elected a Fellow of the American Academy of Arts and Sciences in 1909, a member of the American Philosophical Society in 1910, and the United States National Academy of Sciences in 1914. He was also a descendant of John Gano of Revolutionary War fame, through his great-grandmother Margaret Hubbell Benedict (Gano).

After retirement in 1937 he toured and lectured about magicians. He died at his home in Machiasport, Maine, aged 86. In 1976, Benedict crater on the Moon was named in his honor.

== Fasting study ==
Benedict observed Agostino Levanzin, who fasted for thirty-one days at the Carnegie nutrition laboratory. George F. Cahill Jr. was influenced by the study and conducted similar studies.

== Selected publications ==
- The Influence of Inanition on Metabolism (1907)
- The Composition of the Atmosphere with Special Reference to its Oxygen Content (1912)
- A Study of Prolonged Fasting (1915)
- Chemical and Physiological Studies of a Man Fasting Thirty-One Days (1915)
- Human Vitality and Efficiency Under Prolonged Restricted Diet (1919)
