= Torbern Bergman =

Swedish chemist and mineralogist (1735–1784)

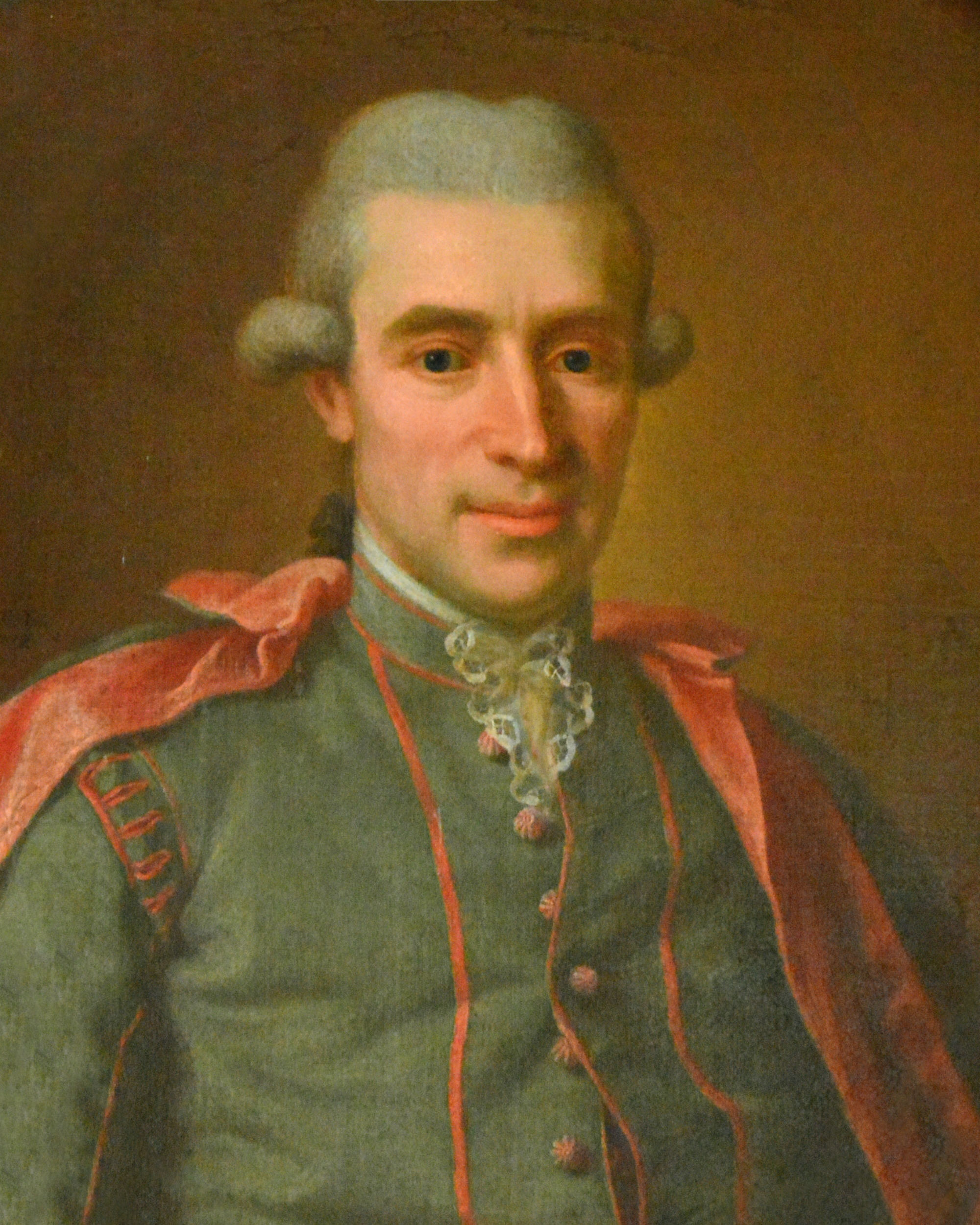
- Portrait by Ulrika Pasch
- Born: Torbern Olof Bergman; 20 March 1735; Katrineberg, Låstad parish, Sweden
- Died: 8 July 1784 (aged 49); Medevi, Sweden
- Education: University of Uppsala
- Known for: Chemical affinity tables
- Spouse: Margareta Catharina Trast
- Scientific career
- Fields: Chemist and mineralogist
- Workplaces: University of Uppsala
- Doctoral advisor: Bengt Ferrner
- Doctoral students: Johann Afzelius

Signature
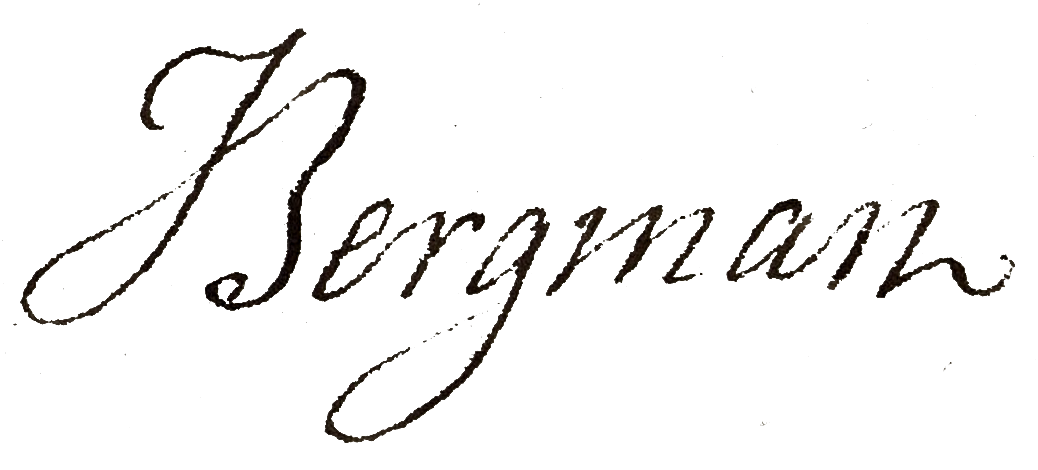

Torbern Olof Bergman (KVO) (20 March 1735 – 8 July 1784) was a Swedish chemist and mineralogist noted for his 1775 Dissertation on Elective Attractions, containing the largest chemical affinity tables ever published. Bergman was the first chemist to use the A, B, C, etc., system of notation for chemical species.

== Early life and education ==
Torbern was born on 20 March 1735, the son of Barthold Bergman and Sara Hägg. He enrolled at the University of Uppsala at age 17. His father wished him to hear either law or divinity, while he himself was anxious to study mathematics and natural science; in the effort to please both himself and his father, he overworked himself and harmed his health. During a period of enforced abstinence from study, he amused himself with field botany and entomology. He was able to send Linnaeus specimens of several new kinds of insects, and in 1756 he succeeded in proving that, contrary to the opinion of that naturalist, the so-called Coccus aquaticus was really the ovum of a kind of leech. He returned to the university in 1758, and received his PhD in that year.

== Career ==
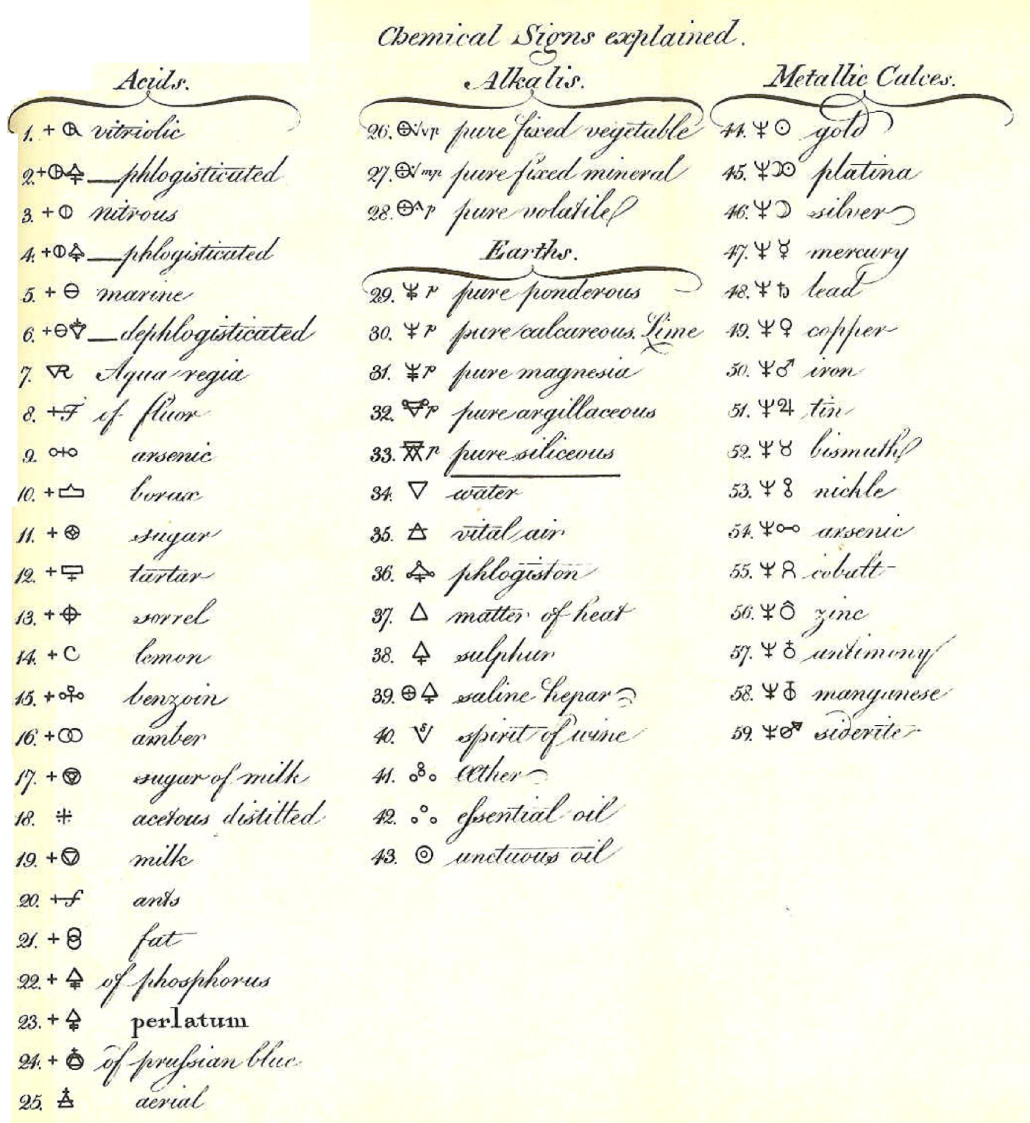
Alchemical symbols in Bergman's 1775 Dissertation on Elective Affinities

Bergman lectured at the University of Uppsala on physics and mathematics, publishing papers on the rainbow, the aurora, the pyroelectric phenomena of tourmaline. Upon the resignation of the celebrated Johan Wallerius, Bergman was a candidate for the professorship of chemistry and mineralogy. His competitors charged him with ignorance of the subject, because he had never written on it. To refute them, he shut himself up for some time in a laboratory, and prepared a treatise on the manufacture of alum, which became a standard work. Thanks to the influence of Gustav III, then crown prince and chancellor of the university, he was appointed a professor of chemistry, and remained at this position for the rest of his life.

Bergman greatly contributed to the advancement of quantitative analysis, and he developed a mineral classification scheme based on chemical characteristics and appearance. He is noted for his research on the chemistry of metals, especially bismuth and nickel.

In 1764, Bergman was elected a member of the Royal Swedish Academy of Sciences. In April 1765 he was elected a Fellow of the Royal Society of London. In 1773 he was elected a member of the American Philosophical Society. In 1782, he coined the name ammonia. In March 1782, he was elected Foreign Associate of the French Academy of Sciences.

In 1771, six years after he first discovered carbonated water and four years after Joseph Priestley first created artificially carbonated water, Bergman perfected a process to make carbonated water from chalk by the action of sulphuric acid. He is also noted for his sponsorship of Carl Wilhelm Scheele, whom some deem to be Bergman's "greatest discovery". The translation into English of his book Physical and Chemical Essays was read widely and regarded as the first systematic method of chemical analysis.

== Personal life ==
In 1771, Bergman married Margareta Catharina Trast.

== Legacy ==
In Bergman's honour, the uranium mineral torbernite and the lunar crater Bergman both bear his name.

== Works ==
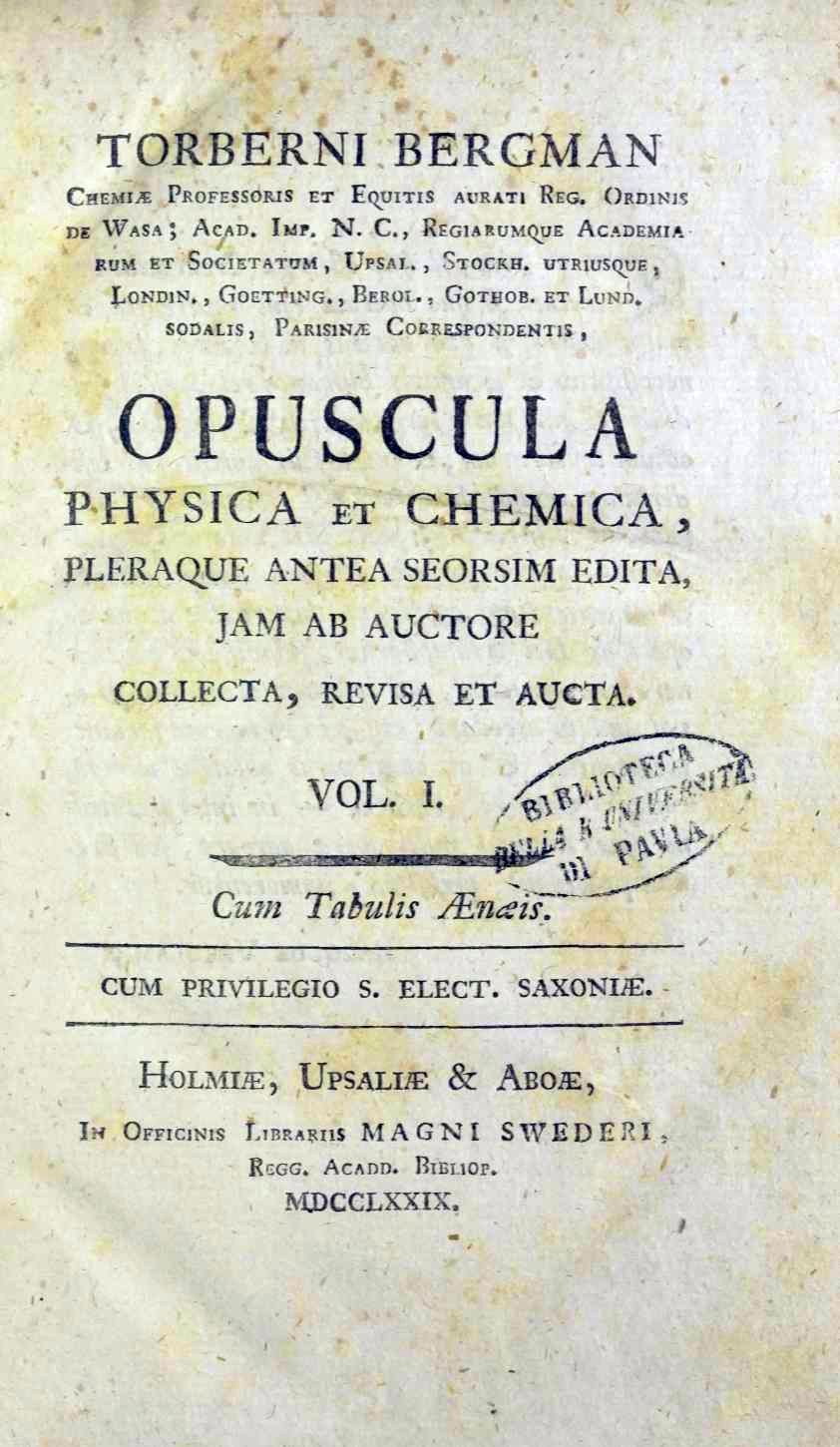
Opuscula physica et chemica, 1779

- Physick Beskrifning Ofver Jordklotet. 1766.
- Opuscula physica et chemica (in Latin). Vol. 1. Stockholm: Magnus Swederus. 1779.
  - Opuscula physica et chemica (in Latin). Vol. 2. Uppsala: John Edman. 1780.
  - Opuscula physica et chemica (in Latin). Vol. 3. Leipzig: Johann Gottfried Müller. 1786.
  - Opuscula physica et chemica (in Latin). Vol. 4. Leipzig: Johann Gottfried Müller. 1787.
  - Opuscula physica et chemica (in Latin). Vol. 5. Leipzig: Johann Gottfried Müller. 1788.
- Bergman, Torbern (1775). A Dissertation on Elective Attractions.
- Essays, Physical and Chemical. 1779–1781.
- Historiae chemiae medium seu obscurum aevum (in Italian). Firenze: Giuseppe Tofani. 1782.
- Tekniska Museet

== See also ==
- Chemical crystallography before X-rays
