= Mark Muir Mills =

American nuclear physicist (1917–1958)

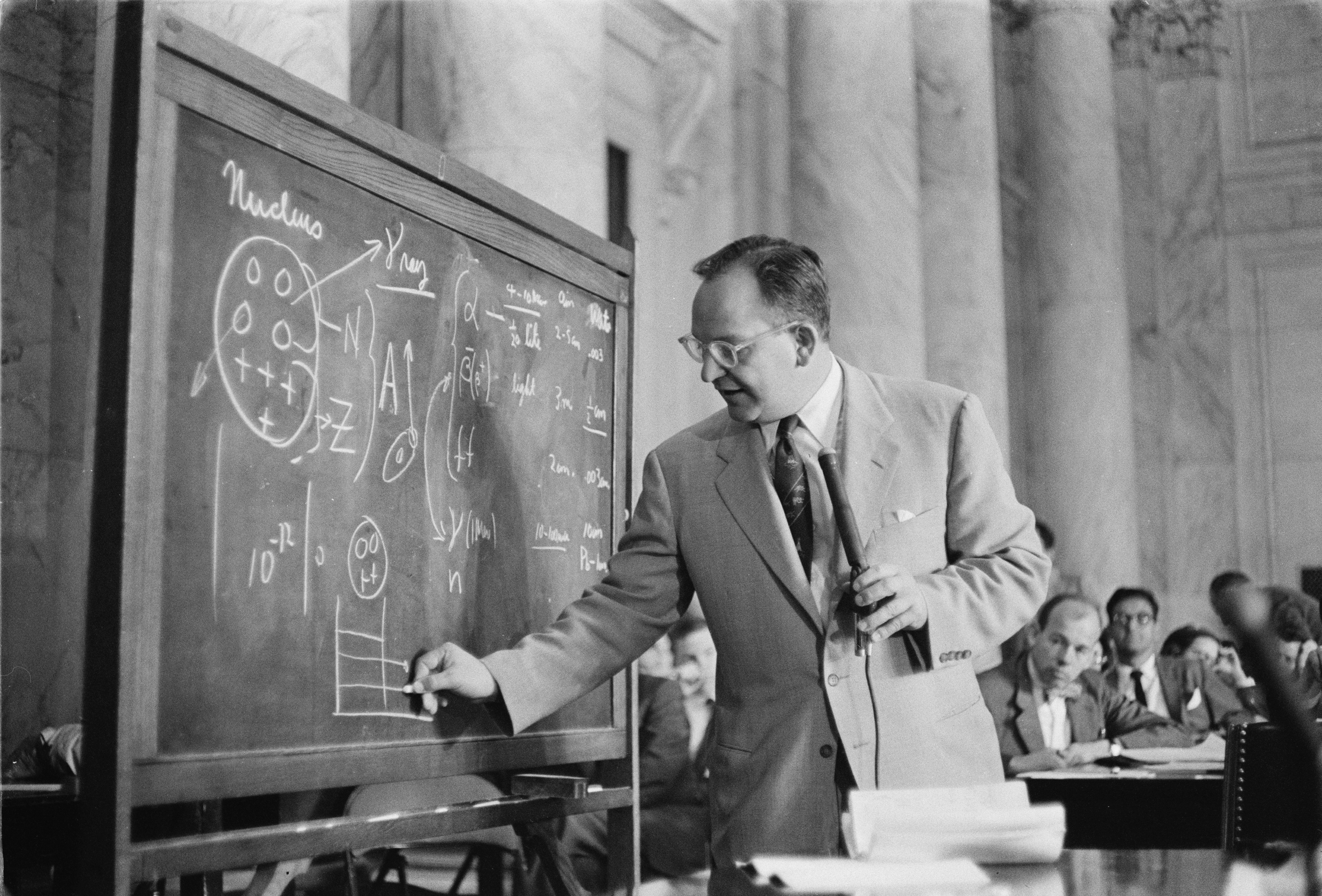
- Mills in 1957
- Born: August 8, 1917; Estes Park, Colorado, U.S.
- Died: April 7, 1958 (aged 40); Eniwetok Atoll, Trust Territory of the Pacific Islands
- Occupation: Nuclear Physicist
- Years active: 1941-1958
- Known for: Atomic bomb development

Mark Muir Mills (August 8, 1917 – April 7, 1958) was an American nuclear physicist and a developer of atomic bombs.

== Biography ==
Mills was born in Estes Park, Colorado to Enoch and Ethel Mills. Prior to college he attended Estes Park High School and then moved to Ft. Lauderdale High School, Florida. He received his B.S. from the California Institute of Technology in 1940. During World War II, he served as a physicist at the Jet Propulsion Laboratory, heading up the solid propellant section. He was also a physics instructor and lectured for the aeronautics department at Caltech.

It was during the war in 1942 that he married Pauline Riedeburg. He completed his Ph.D. in physics from Caltech in 1948.

Following his graduation he started working at North American Aviation, performing theoretical work in their atomic energy research department. He and his colleagues made valuable contributions in the field of nuclear reactor technology. In 1951 he became technical director at Project SQUID at Princeton University, where basic research was performed in aircraft propulsion. In 1952 he returned to his work in reactor design at North American.

In 1954 he joined the radiation laboratory at the University of California, becoming head of the theoretical division. By 1955 he was a part-time lecturer at the university, on the subject of nuclear reactor theory. He also helped organize the nuclear engineering program at the institution. He would become a professor of Nuclear Engineering at the university in 1957. He was also made chairman of the school's division of nuclear engineering.

In 1958 he took a leave of absence to become deputy director of the Livermore radiation laboratory at the University of California. It was during this period that he was killed during an accident at the Eniwetok Proving Ground, located on the Eniwetok Atoll in the Marshall Islands. He was flying in a helicopter that was forced down as a result of torrential rain. This accident occurred during the preparations for a series of atomic bomb tests.

Dr. Mills and his wife had two children, Mark John and Ann.

== Awards and honors ==
- Presidential citation for significant contributions to the national defense.
- The Mark Mills Memorial Library, part of the Department of Nuclear Engineering at the University of California at Berkeley, was named for him.
- American Nuclear Society's Mark Mills Award is named for him.
- The crater Mills on the Moon is named after him.

== Bibliography ==
- Mills, Mark M., Modern Nuclear Technology, a Survey for Industry and Business, 1960, New York, McGraw-Hill.
- Howard S. Seifert, Mark M. Mills and Martin Summerfield, Physics of Rockets: Liquid-Propellant Rockets, AJP 15, 121–140, (1947).
- Howard S. Seifert, Mark M. Mills and Martin Summerfield, Physics of Rockets: Dynamics of Long Range Rockets, AJP 15, 255–272, (1947).
- Safety of Nuclear Reactors.
