= Hartmann (crater) =

Lunar impact crater

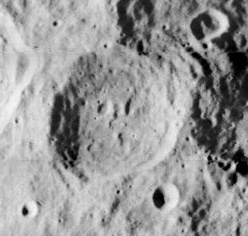
- Lunar Orbiter 1 image
- Coordinates: 3.2°N 135.3°E
- Diameter: 61 km
- Colongitude: 225° at sunrise
- Eponym: Johannes F. Hartmann

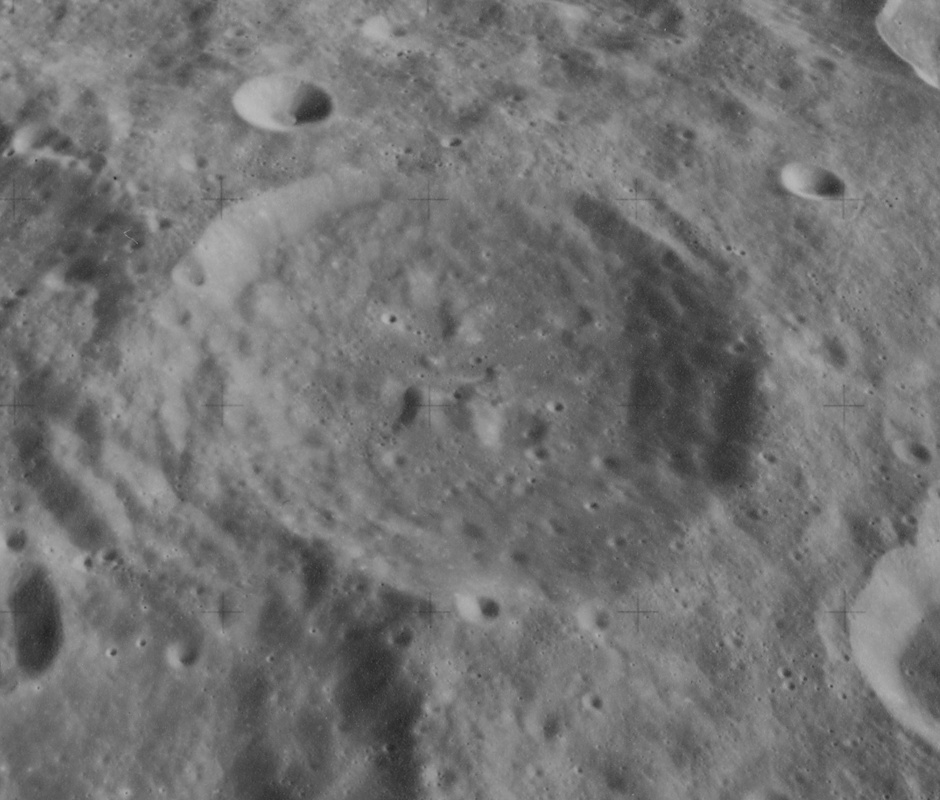
Oblique view facing south from Apollo 16

Hartmann is a lunar impact crater on the far side of the Moon. It lies astride the west-southwestern rim of a huge walled plain named Mendeleev, and intrudes part way into the wide inner wall of this feature. Nearly attached to the northwestern rim of Hartmann is the crater Green.

The unusual placement of this crater and the proximity of Green have given Hartmann a somewhat oddly shaped outer rim. The rim is slightly oblong in shape and it has an outward bulge to the east. The inner wall is wider on the eastern side, offsetting the interior floor to the western side. This floor is also oval in shape and is somewhat irregular.

The crater was named after German astronomer Johannes Franz Hartmann in 1970. Prior to that, this crater was designated Crater 217.

== Satellite craters ==
By convention these features are identified on lunar maps by placing the letter on the side of the crater midpoint that is closest to Hartmann.

Hartmann	Latitude	Longitude	Diameter
K	1.8° N	136.0° E	13 km

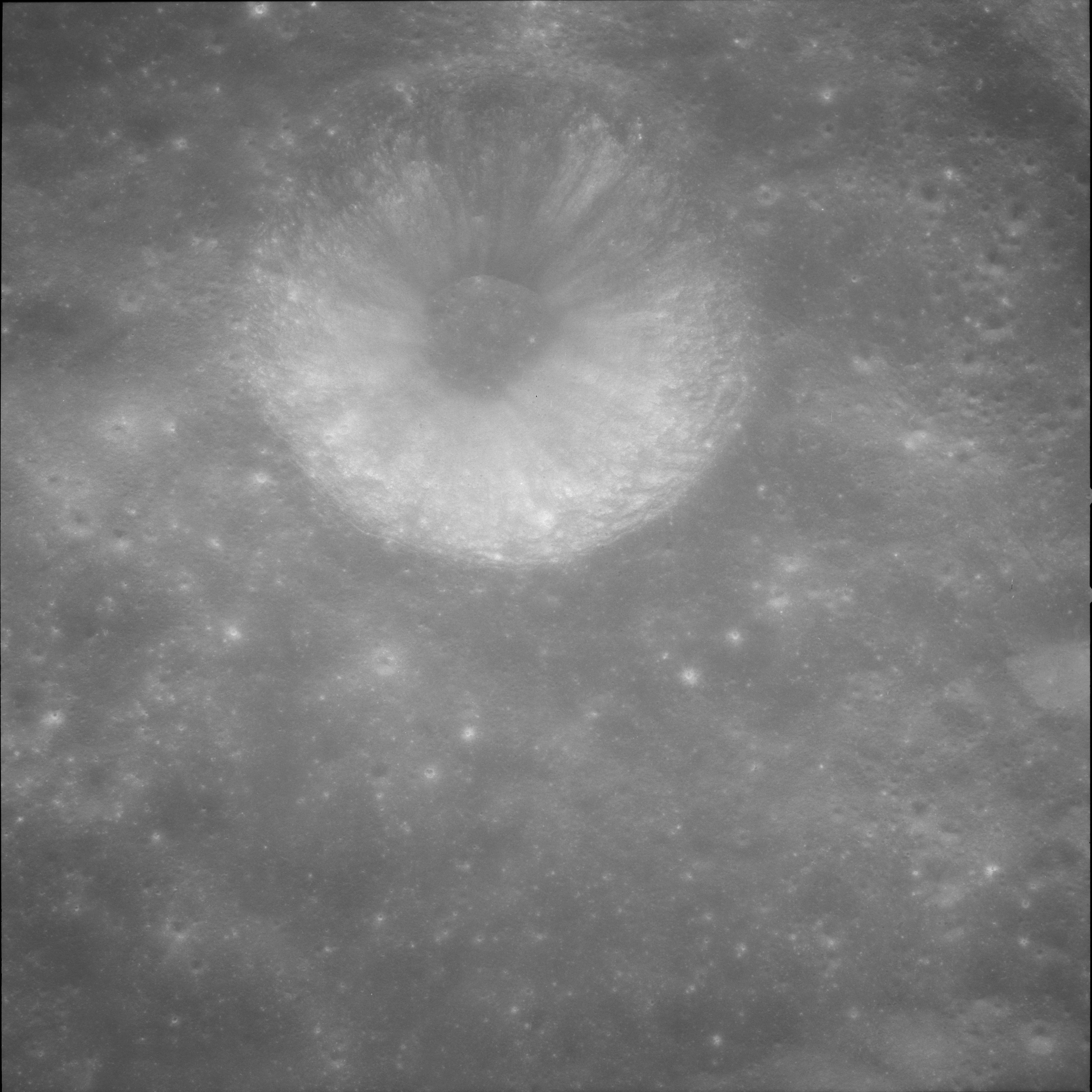
Hartmann K crater, from Apollo 11
