= Moissan (crater) =

Crater on the Moon

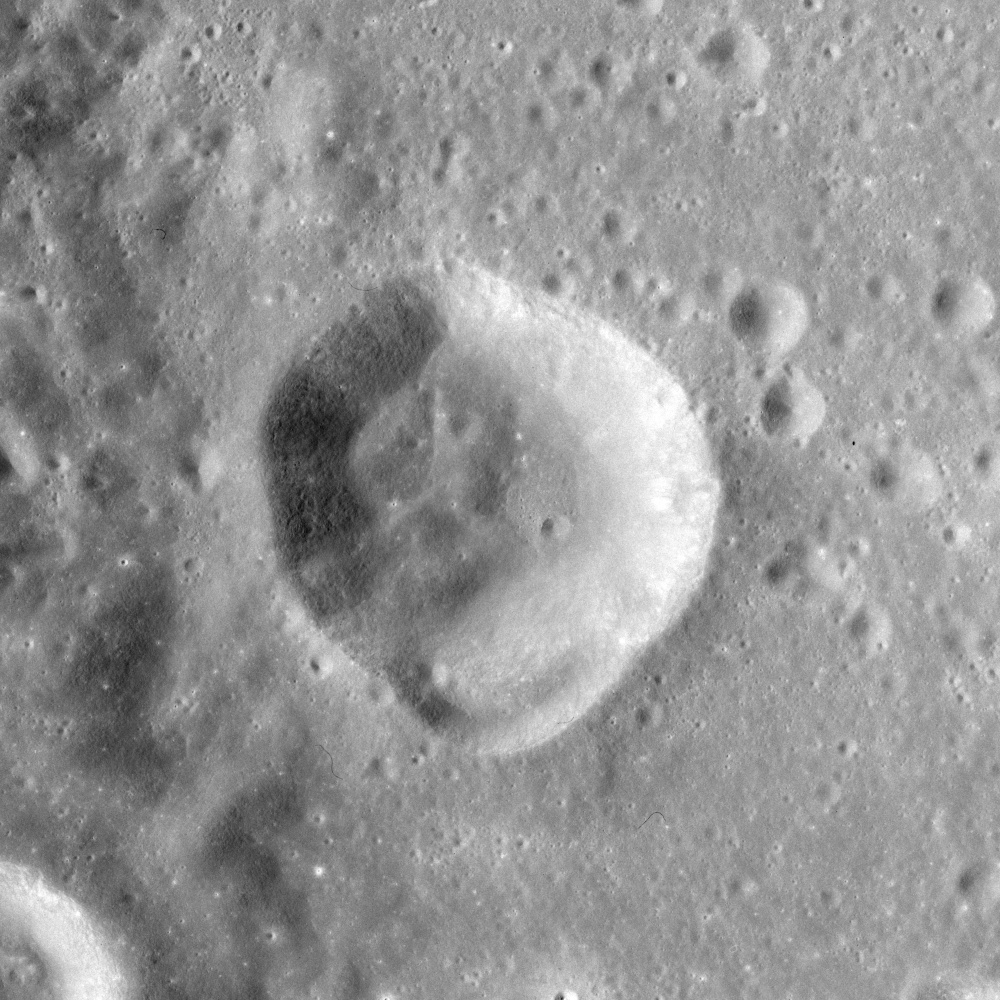
- Apollo 16 image
- Coordinates: 4.77°N 137.45°E
- Diameter: 22.45 km
- Depth: 2.10 km
- Eponym: Henri Moissan

Moissan is a small lunar impact crater that is located on the far side of the Moon, within the west rim of the large crater Mendeleev, and due south of the similar-sized Bergman.

The rim of this crater is not quite circular, with an outward bulge along the southern edge. The interior floor is irregular, with a craterlet to the southeast. The infrared spectrum of pure crystalline plagioclase has been identified along the north and northeast section of the wall.

The crater name was adopted by the IAU in 1976, and refers to French chemist and Nobel laureate Henri Moissan.
