= Schuster (crater) =

Lunar impact crater

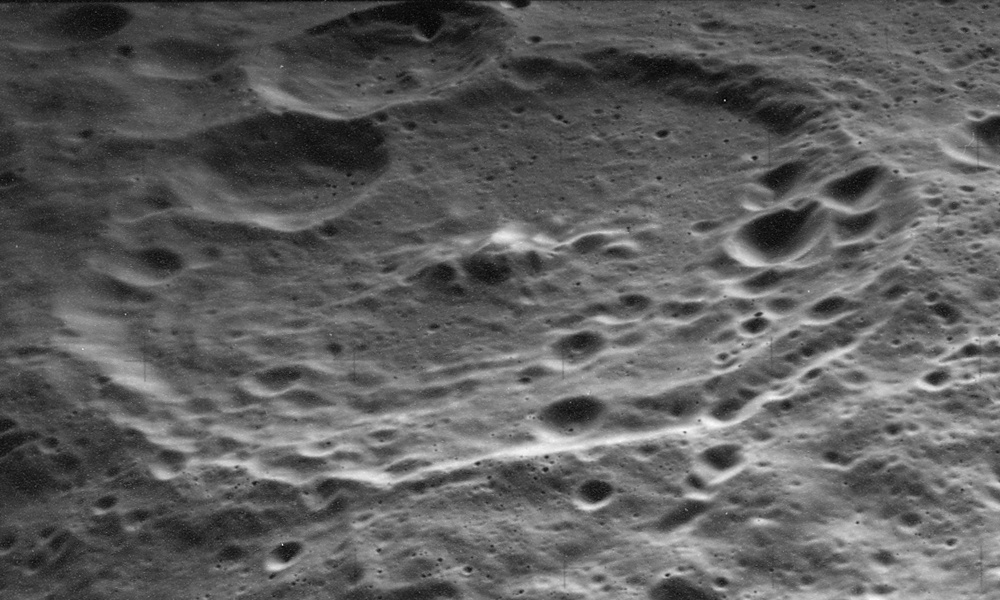
- Oblique Apollo 16 image, facing west
- Coordinates: 4.2°N 146.5°E
- Diameter: 108 km
- Depth: Unknown
- Colongitude: 215° at sunrise
- Eponym: Arthur Schuster

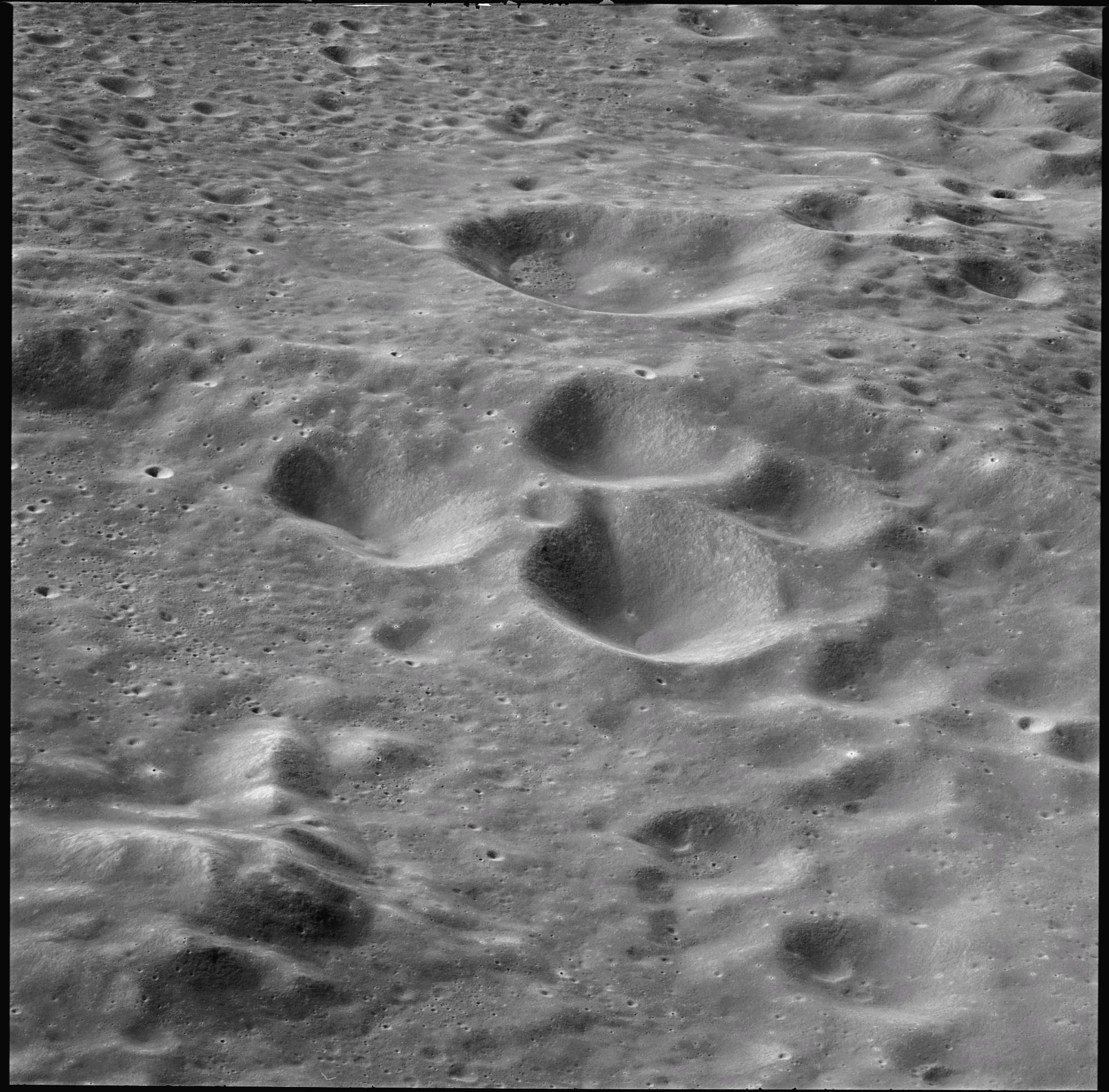
Oblique view of northern Schuster, from Apollo 10. The central peak is in left foreground.

Schuster is a lunar impact crater that lies along the eastern rim of the much larger walled plain named Mendeleev, on the far side of the Moon. To the east of Schuster is the crater Henderson, and to the southeast lies the large Chaplygin.

The schuster is a worn and eroded crater formation, with the most intact portion of the rim along the western half where it overlaps Mendeleev. There is a tight cluster of small craterlets along the northern inner wall and floor where the crater rim joins the rim of Mendeleev. The satellite craters Schuster N and Schuster R overlie the southwestern rim edge. At the midpoint of the crater interior is a central peak, which bears the infrared spectrum of pure crystalline plagioclase. The eastern half of the floor is pock-marked by small and tiny craterlets.

Prior to naming in 1970 by the IAU, this crater was known as Crater 218.

== Satellite craters ==
By convention these features are identified on lunar maps by placing the letter on the side of the crater midpoint that is closest to Schuster.

Schuster	Latitude	Longitude	Diameter
J	1.8° N	149.6° E	14 km
K	1.3° N	147.7° E	17 km
N	3.4° N	145.8° E	27 km
P	1.9° N	144.4° E	16 km
Q	1.0° N	143.4° E	45 km
R	3.5° N	144.8° E	40 km
Y	6.7° N	145.5° E	17 km
