= Fischer (crater) =

Crater on the Moon

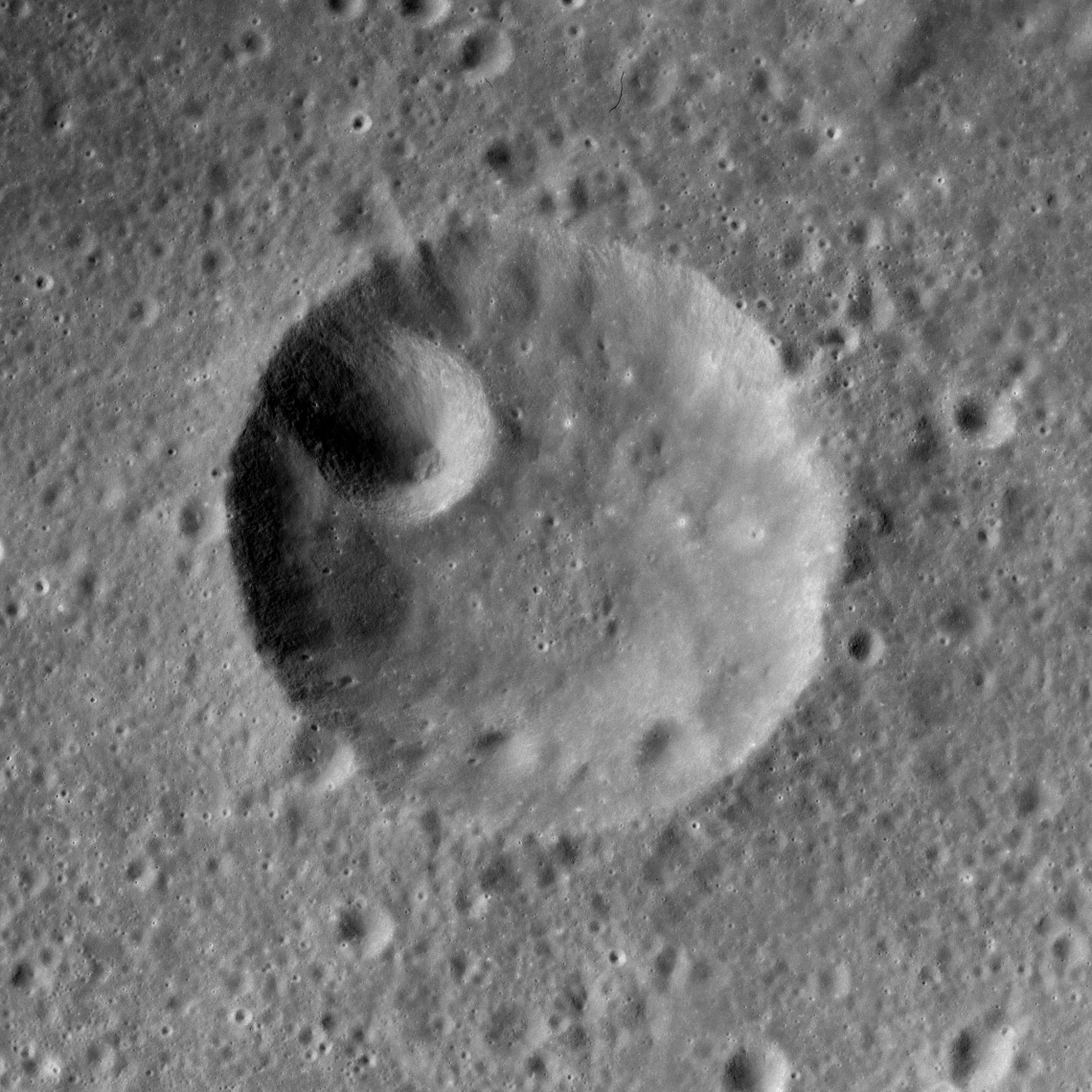
- Apollo 16 image
- Coordinates: 8.0°N 142.4°E
- Diameter: 30.48 km (18.94 mi)
- Depth: 2.43 km (1.51 mi)
- Colongitude: 218° at sunrise
- Eponym: Hermann Emil Fischer; Hans Fischer

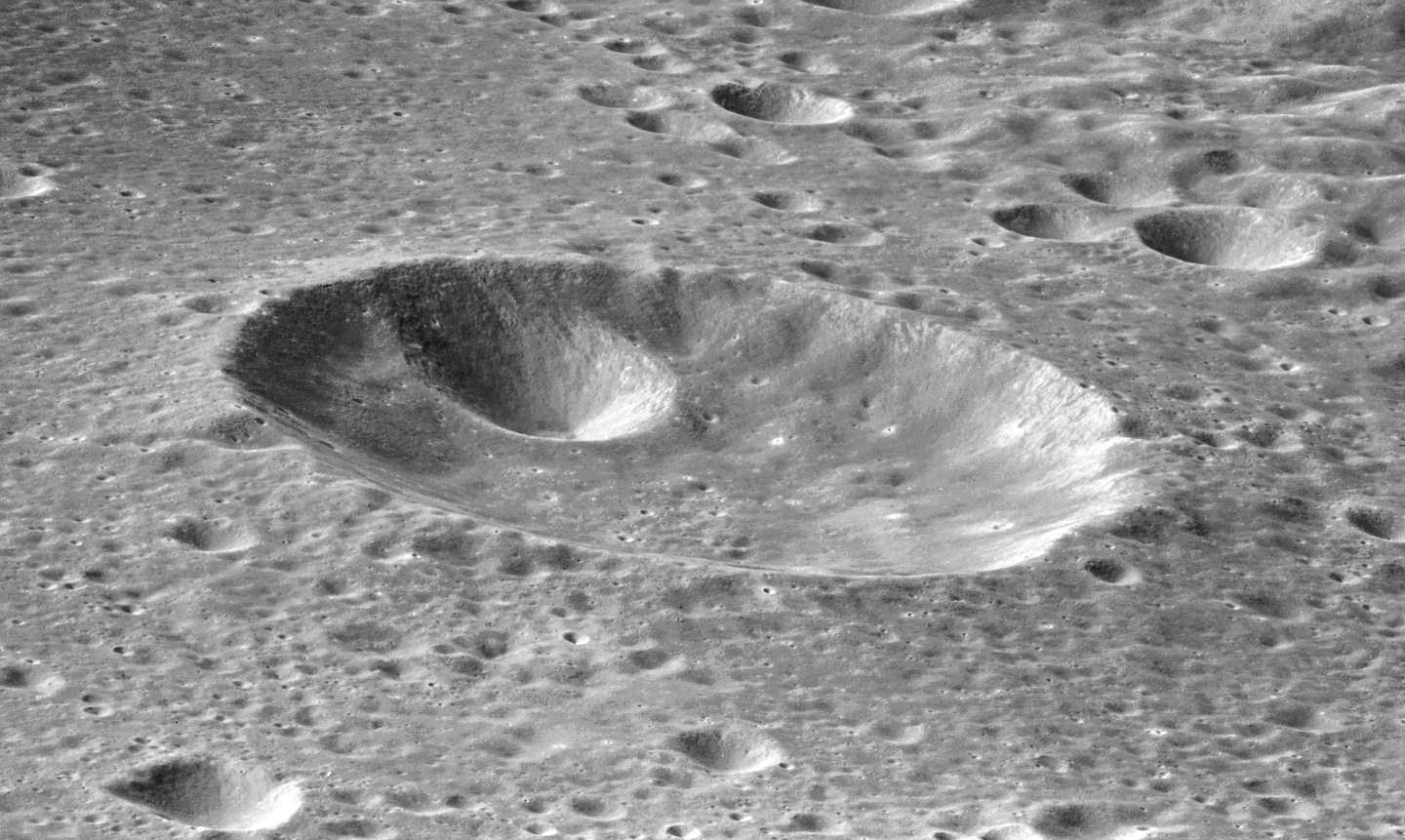
Apollo 10 image

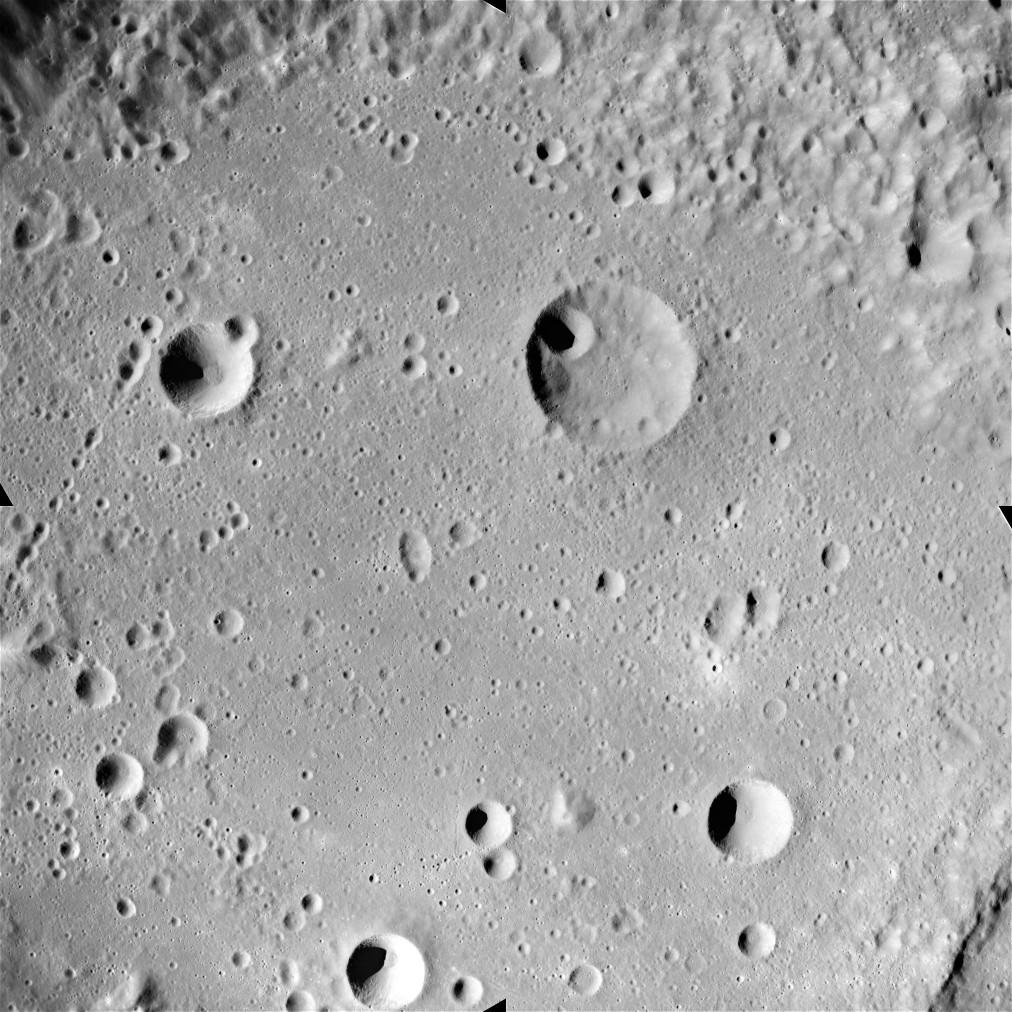
Apollo 16 image of interior of Mendeleev. Fischer is above center, and Richards is in upper left. Harden is in lower right. Benedict is along bottom edge.

Fischer is a lunar impact crater that lies in the northeastern part of the interior floor of Mendeleev, a huge walled plain. This feature is located on the far side of the Moon relative to the Earth, and can only be viewed from a spacecraft.

This crater has a slender, circular rim and an interior that has the same albedo as the surrounding surface. There is a smaller impact crater within the interior, adjacent to the northwestern inner wall. The rim and the floor of Fischer are pitted by several tiny craterlets.

The crater is named after two German Nobel Prize in Chemistry laureates: chemist Emil Fischer (1852–1919) and organic chemist Hans Fischer (1881–1945). Its designation was formally adopted by the International Astronomical Union in 1976.
