= Henderson (crater) =

Crater on the Moon

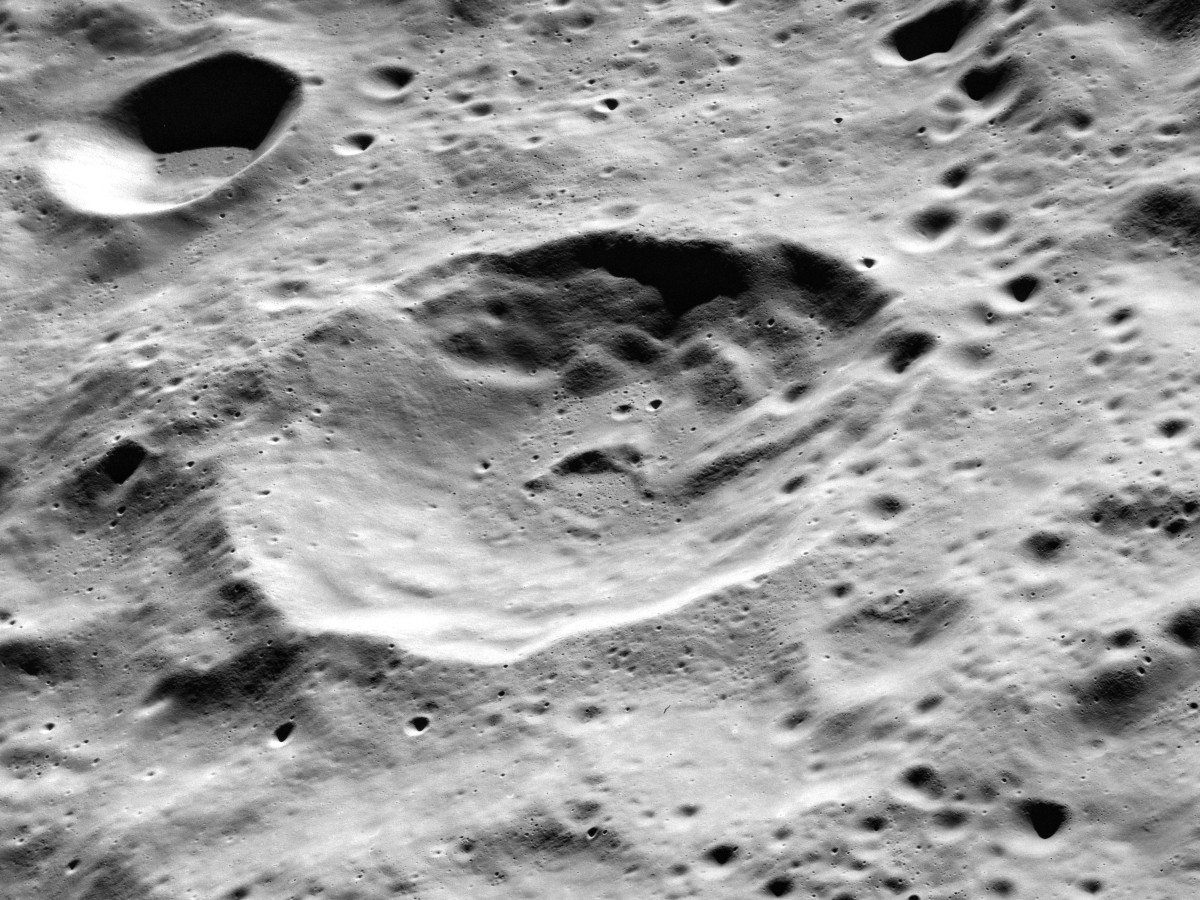
- Oblique Apollo 16 image, facing west
- Coordinates: 4.8°N 152.1°E
- Diameter: 47 km
- Depth: Unknown
- Colongitude: 208° at sunrise
- Eponym: Thomas Henderson

Henderson is a crater on the far side of the Moon. It is located to the east of the huge walled plain named Mendeleev. This is a worn crater with a shallow rim. It includes a 5-km long lobate scarp. No significant craters overlie the rim or interior, but a smaller, worn crater is attached to the southern outer rim. A ridge of material runs from the northwest rim to the midpoint of the floor. Henderson lies within the eroded remains of a larger and older crater-like feature.

== Satellite craters ==
By convention these features are identified on lunar maps by placing the letter on the side of the crater midpoint that is closest to Henderson.

Henderson	Latitude	Longitude	Diameter
B	7.6° N	153.2° E	18 km
F	4.7° N	155.7° E	14 km
G	3.6° N	155.8° E	46 km
Q	3.4° N	151.0° E	17 km

Henderson Q dates to the Copernican period and has a meteoritic iron-rich impact melt.
