= Mendeleev (crater) =

Impact crater

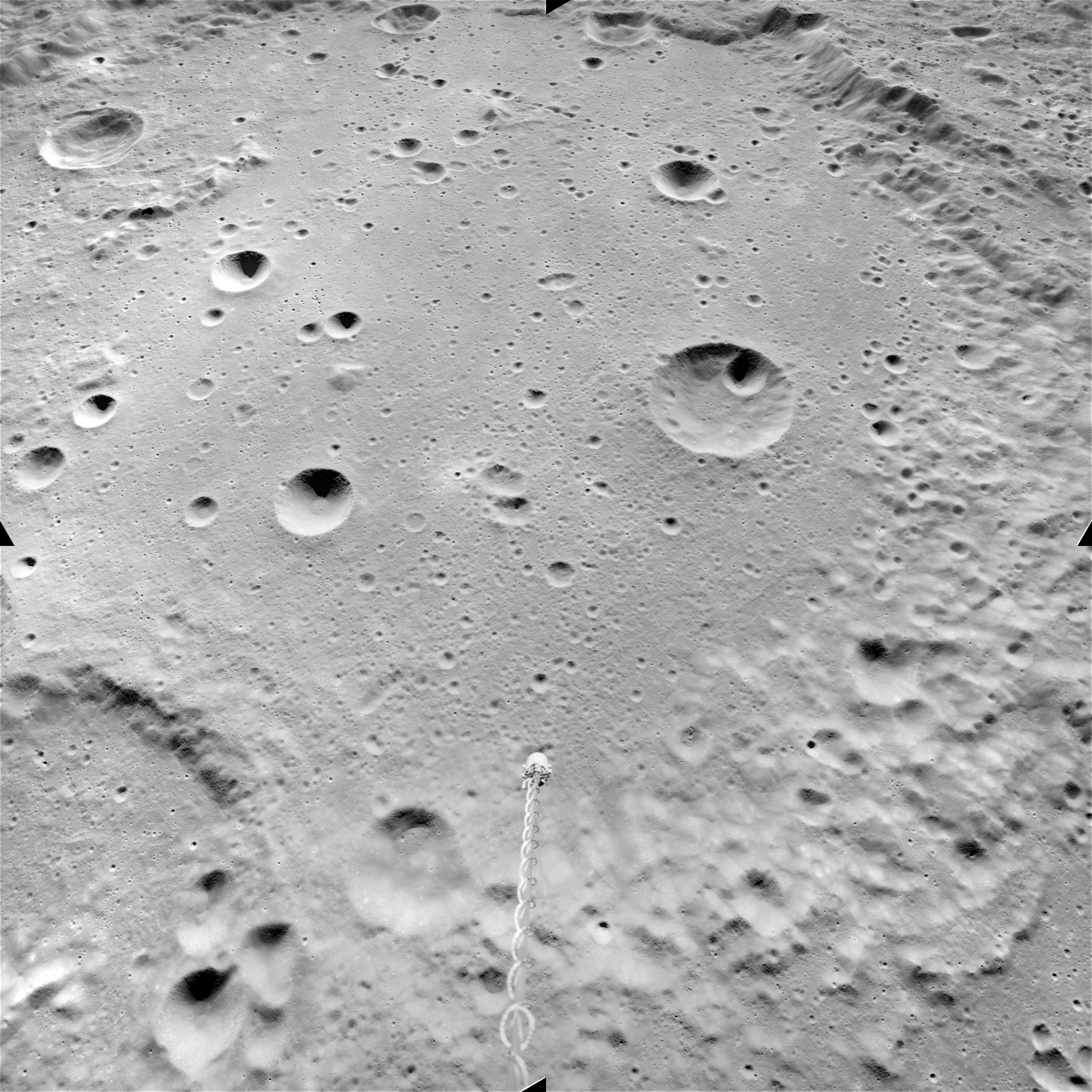
- Oblique Apollo 16 image, facing west (Gamma-ray spectrometer in foreground)
- Coordinates: 5.7°N 140.9°E
- Diameter: 313 km
- Depth: 3.04 km
- Colongitude: 224° at sunrise
- Formation: Nectarian
- Eponym: Dmitri Mendeleev

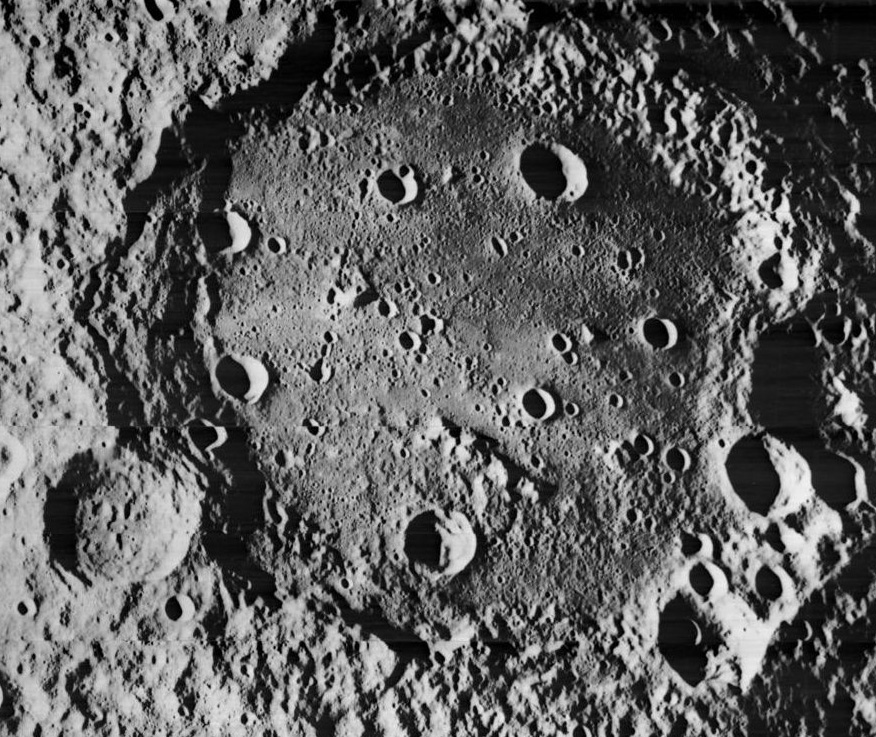
Lunar Orbiter 1 image

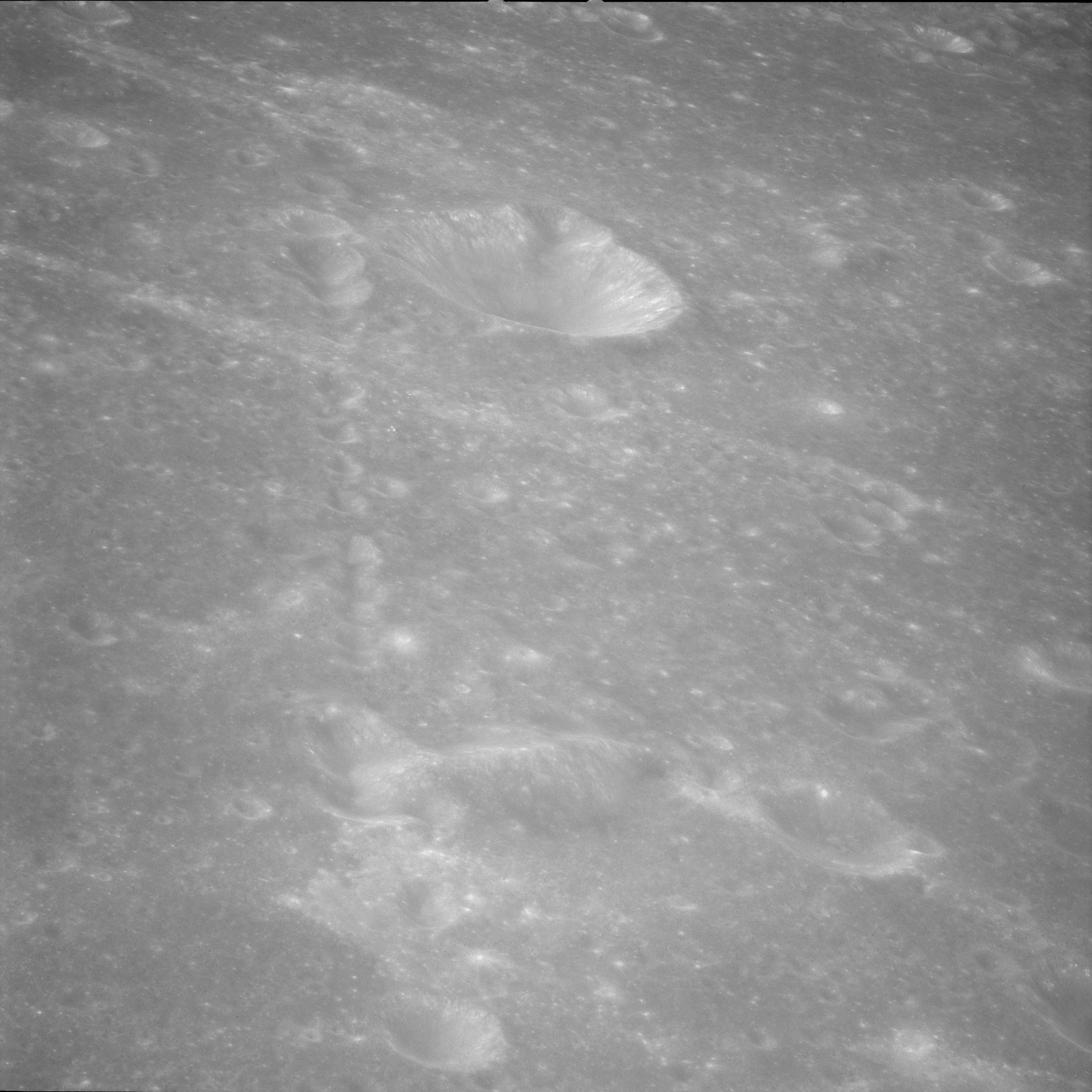
Oblique view of Catena Mendeleev from Apollo 11. The crater Richards is at the top center. NASA photo.

Mendeleev is a large lunar impact crater that is located on the far side of the Moon, as seen from the Earth. The southern rim of this walled plain just crosses the lunar equator. Intruding into the eastern rim of Mendeleev is the crater Schuster. Nearly on the opposite side, the smaller Hartmann intrudes into west-southwestern rim.

This class of formation is known as a peak ring basin, which has a single interior topographic ring or a discontinuous ring of peaks with no central peak. Mendeleev dates to the Nectarian period of the lunar geologic timescale. The interior plains of Mendeleev are covered with deposits of the Cayley Formation of Imbrian age.

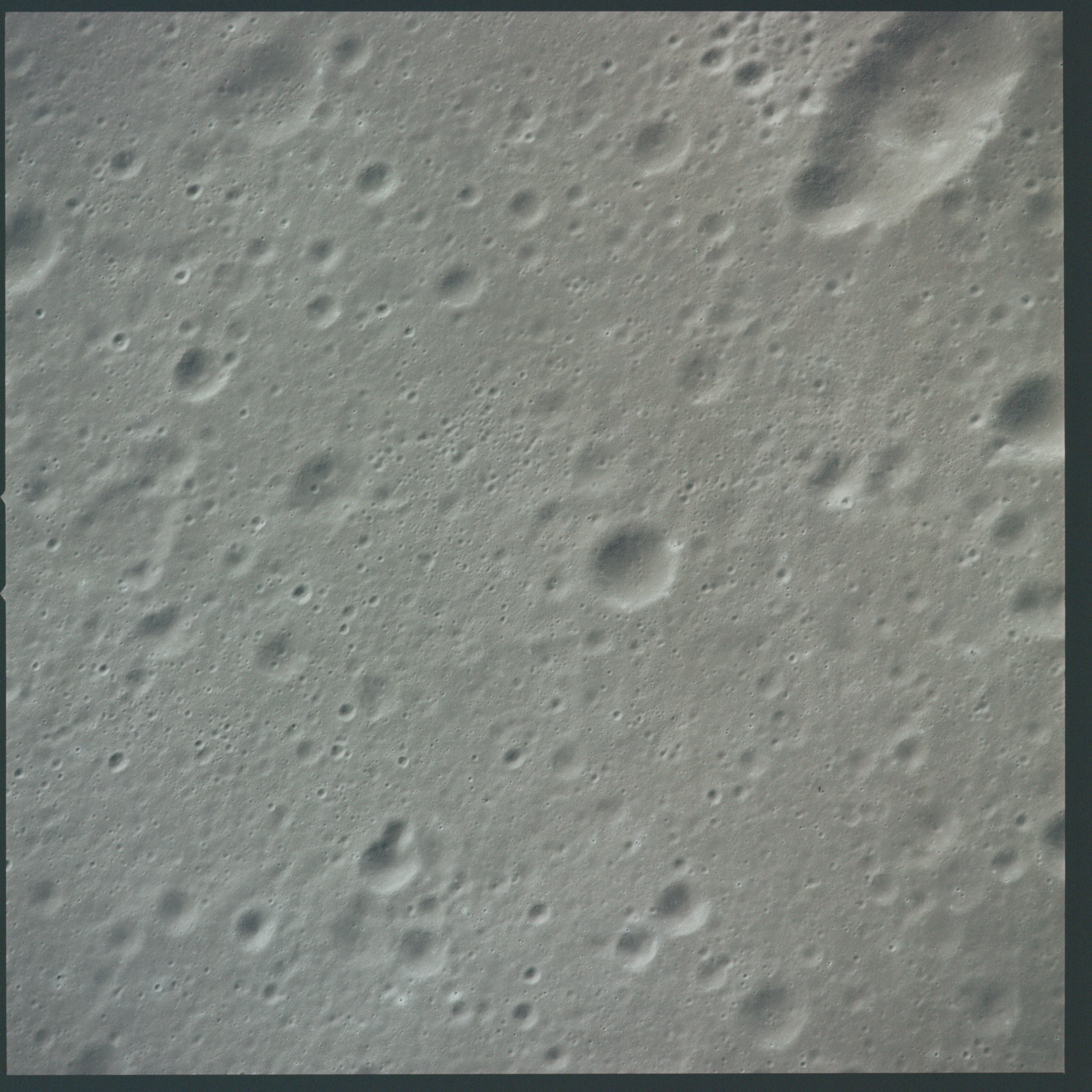
Cayley Formation on the floor of Mendeleev (Apollo 16 image)

The crater is named after the Russian chemist Dmitri Mendeleev. Even after formal naming in 1961 by the IAU, the crater was known as Basin IX until the early 1970s.

== Description ==
The nearly level interior of Mendeleev contains a number of smaller crater formations which have been given names. These form a rough pentagon formation that covers much of the interior floor. Along the western inner floor, the craters Bergman to the west-northwest and Moissan to the west just make contact with the western inner wall of Mendeleev. Together with Bergman, Fischer to the north-northeast and Richards in the north of Mendeleev form the northern side of the pentagon. The figure continues with Harden near Schuster, and Benedict just to the southeast of the midpoint of Mendeleev. The largest crater within the Mendeleev basin is Mendeleev P, to the south-southwest.

The remainder of the interior floor is relatively flat, at least in comparison to the rugged blast terrain radiating away from the exterior. There are, however, a number of small craters within the interior in addition to those mentioned above. A cluster of these craters lie near the midpoint of the interior, and there are several in the southeast part of the floor. In the western half of the floor is a chain of tiny craters named the Catena Mendeleev. These form a line that trends from near the southwest part of the interior, then tangentially grazes the western rim of the crater Richards. The line of craters points directly to Tsiolkovskiy crater far to the southwest, and are thought to be secondaries from it.

== In fiction ==
In Stanislaw Lem's More Tales of Pirx the Pilot, a story is wrapped around a fictional lunar science facility that is stationed in Mendeleev.

== Satellite craters ==
By convention these features are identified on lunar maps by placing the letter on the side of the crater midpoint that is closest to Mendeleev. In this case, the only satellite crater is Mendeleev P, which lies within southern Mendeleev itself.

Mendeleev	Latitude	Longitude	Diameter
P	2.7° N	139.4° E	29 km
