= Armiński (crater) =

Lunar impact crater

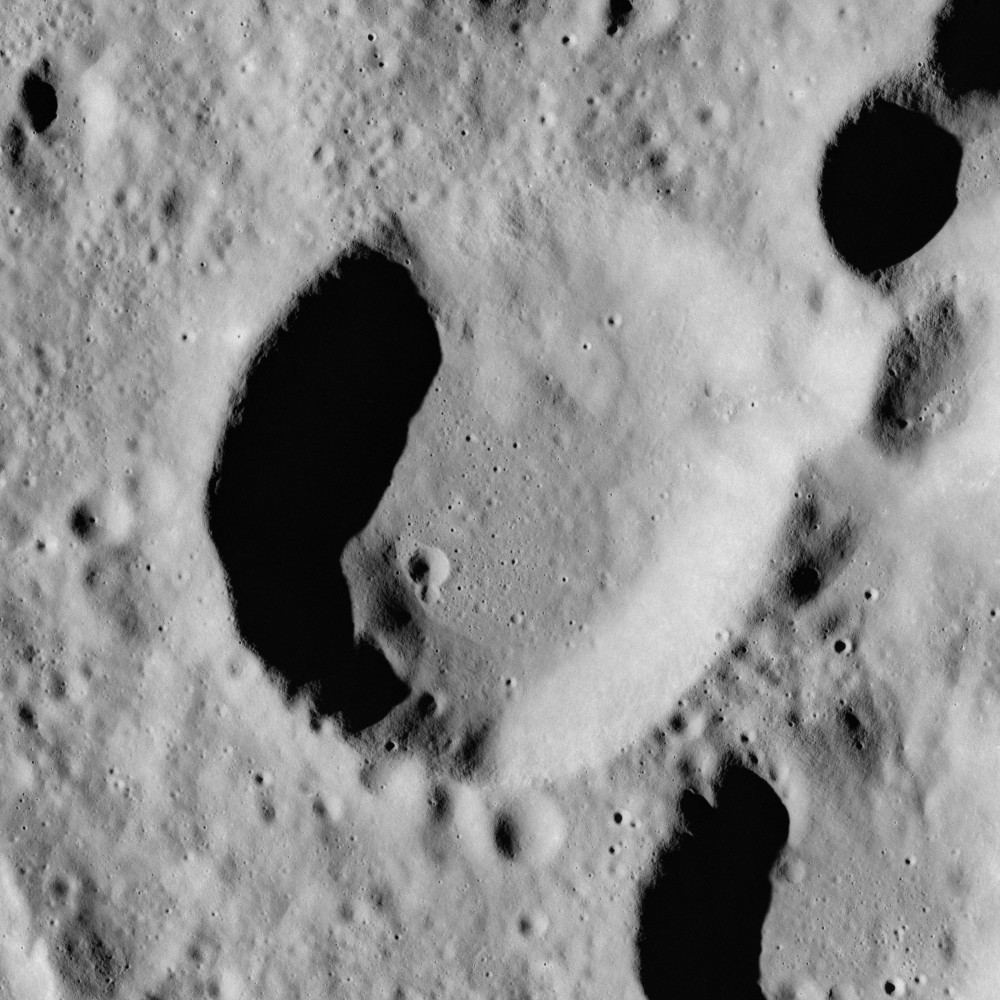
- Apollo 17 image
- Coordinates: 16.4°S 154.2°E
- Diameter: 26.76 km (16.63 mi)
- Depth: Unknown
- Colongitude: 206° at sunrise
- Eponym: Franciszek Armiński

Armiński is a small lunar impact crater that is located on the far side of the Moon, to the northeast of the large walled basin Gagarin. To the northwest of Armiński is the crater Beijerinck, and to the southeast lies Cyrano.

The rim of Armiński is slightly oval in shape, being somewhat elongated in the northeastern direction. It forms a double-crater with Armiński K, a slightly smaller formation nearly attached to the southeast rim. There is pair of a tiny craterlets lying across the southwest part of Arminski's outer wall. The interior floor is relatively level, with a small craterlet near the western inner wall.

This crater is named after Polish astronomer Franciszek Armiński (1789-1848). Its designation was officially adopted by the International Astronomical Union in 1976.

== Satellite craters ==
By convention these features are identified on lunar maps by placing the letter on the side of the crater midpoint that is closest to Armiński.

Armiński	Latitude	Longitude	Diameter
D	15.9° S	155.3° E	19 km
K	17.1° S	154.6° E	22 km
