= Wróblewski (crater) =

Crater on the Moon

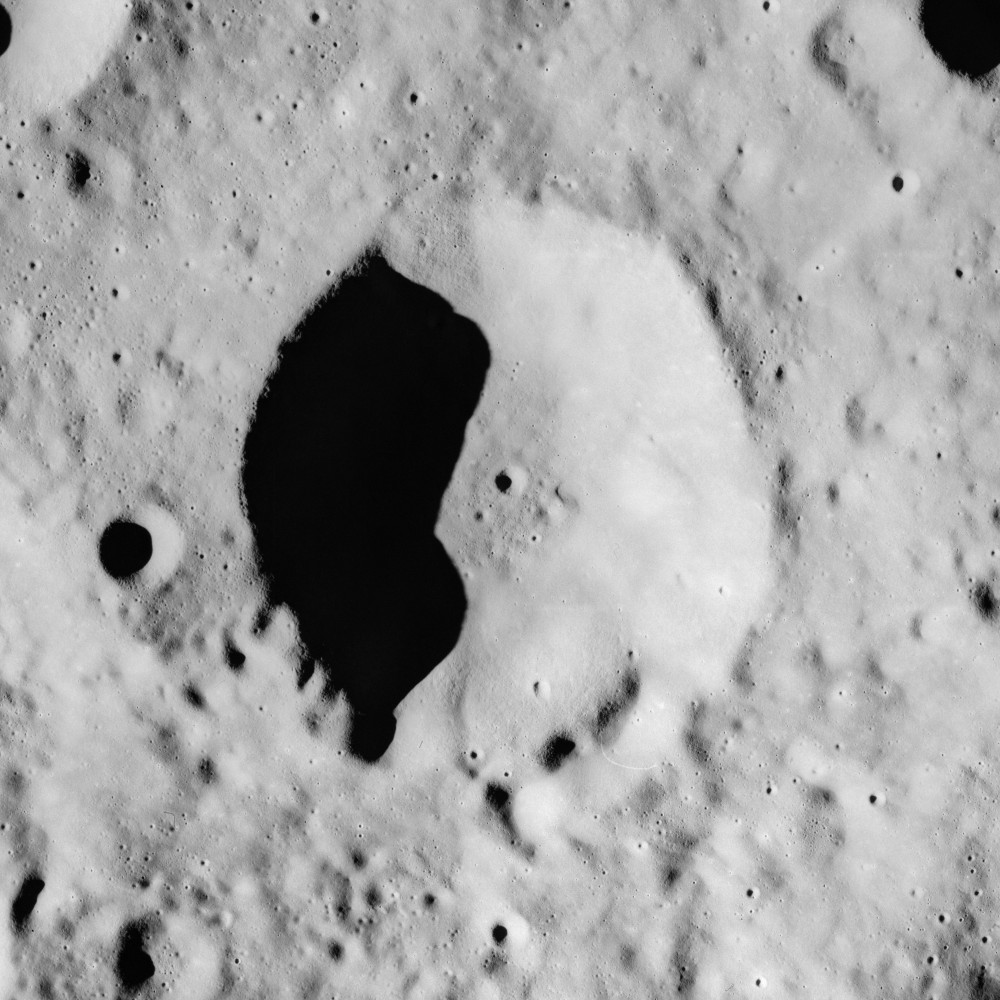
- Apollo 15 image
- Coordinates: 4.0°S 152.8°E
- Diameter: 21 km
- Depth: Unknown
- Colongitude: 207° at sunrise
- Eponym: Zygmunt Florenty Wróblewski

Wróblewski is a small lunar impact crater located just southeast of the large walled plain named Gagarin, on the far side of the Moon. The crater Raspletin lies along the rim of Gagarin, just to the northwest of Wróblewski, while Sierpiński is situated to the south-southeast.

Like many lunar craters of this size, Wróblewski is roughly circular and bowl-shaped. Its rim has experienced some erosion due to subsequent impacts.
