= Grave (disambiguation) =

A grave is a location where a dead body is buried.

Grave may also refer to:

== Phonetics, diacritics, and music ==
- Grave (band), a Swedish death metal band
- "Grave", a 2025 song by Kid Cudi from his album Free
- Grave (phonetic), a term used to classify sounds
- Grave (tempo), a term for a slow and solemn music tempo or a solemn mood in general
- Grave accent, a diacritical mark
  - Backtick, also known as grave, a character on computer keyboards

== Places ==
- Grave (crater), on the Moon
- Grave, Netherlands, a municipality in the Dutch province of North Brabant
- La Grave, a commune in southeastern France

== People ==
- Dmitry Grave (1863–1939), Russian and Soviet mathematician
- Franz Grave (1932–2022), German Roman Catholic bishop
- Hendrik Gravé (1670–1749), Dutch States Navy officer
- Ivan Grave (1874–1960), Soviet general and scientist
- Jean Grave (1854–1939), French anarchist writer
- Jørgen Grave (1909–1988), Norwegian politician
- Manuel Grave (born 1989), Portuguese equestrian rider
- Robert Grave (d. 1600), Anglican priest
- W.W. Grave (1901–1999), English academic

== Media and entertainment ==
- Grave, the main character in the third-person shooter video games Gungrave and Beyond the Grave
- "Grave" (Buffy the Vampire Slayer), the final episode of the sixth season of Buffy the Vampire Slayer
- Grave (film), a 2016 film also titled as Raw
- "Grave", the second single from Kid Cudi's eleventh studio album Free

== Other uses ==
- Grave, cognate of the German Graf, a historical title of the German nobility
- Grave (unit), an old unprefixed name for the kilogram

== See also ==
- Graves (disambiguation)
- The Grave (disambiguation)
- The Graves (disambiguation)
