= Graves (disambiguation) =

Graves is the plural of grave, a location where a dead body is buried.

Graves or The Graves may also refer to:

== Geography ==
- Graves (wine region), a wine region of Bordeaux
- Graves, Georgia, a community in the United States
- The Graves (Massachusetts), group of rock outcroppings in Massachusetts Bay
- Graves County, Kentucky, United States

== Arts and entertainment ==
- Graves (band), a band featuring former Misfits members Michale Graves and Dr. Chud
- Graves (TV series), an American comedy television series
- The Graves (film), a 2009 film directed by Brian Pulido
- "Graves" (song), a 2022 song by KB and Brandon Lake
- Graves, a 2017 song by Caligula's Horse from their album In Contact
- Graves, a 2018 song by Chvrches from their album Love Is Dead
- Graves (short story), a short story by Joe Haldeman

== Other uses ==
- Graves (surname), people
- Graves (food), a byproduct of the rendering process used in animal feed
- Graves' disease, hyperthyroid disease
- Graves (system), a French satellite tracking system
- Julian Graves, a health food retailer in the United Kingdom
- Graves speculum, a medical device

== See also ==
- Grave (disambiguation)
- The Grave (disambiguation)
- The Graves (disambiguation)
- Justice Graves (disambiguation)
