= Denning (lunar crater) =

Lunar impact crater

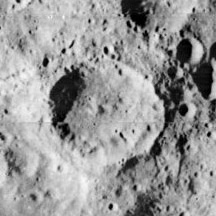
- Lunar Orbiter 1 image
- Coordinates: 16.4°S 142.6°E
- Diameter: 44.18 km (27.45 mi)
- Depth: Unknown
- Colongitude: 218° at sunrise
- Eponym: William F. Denning

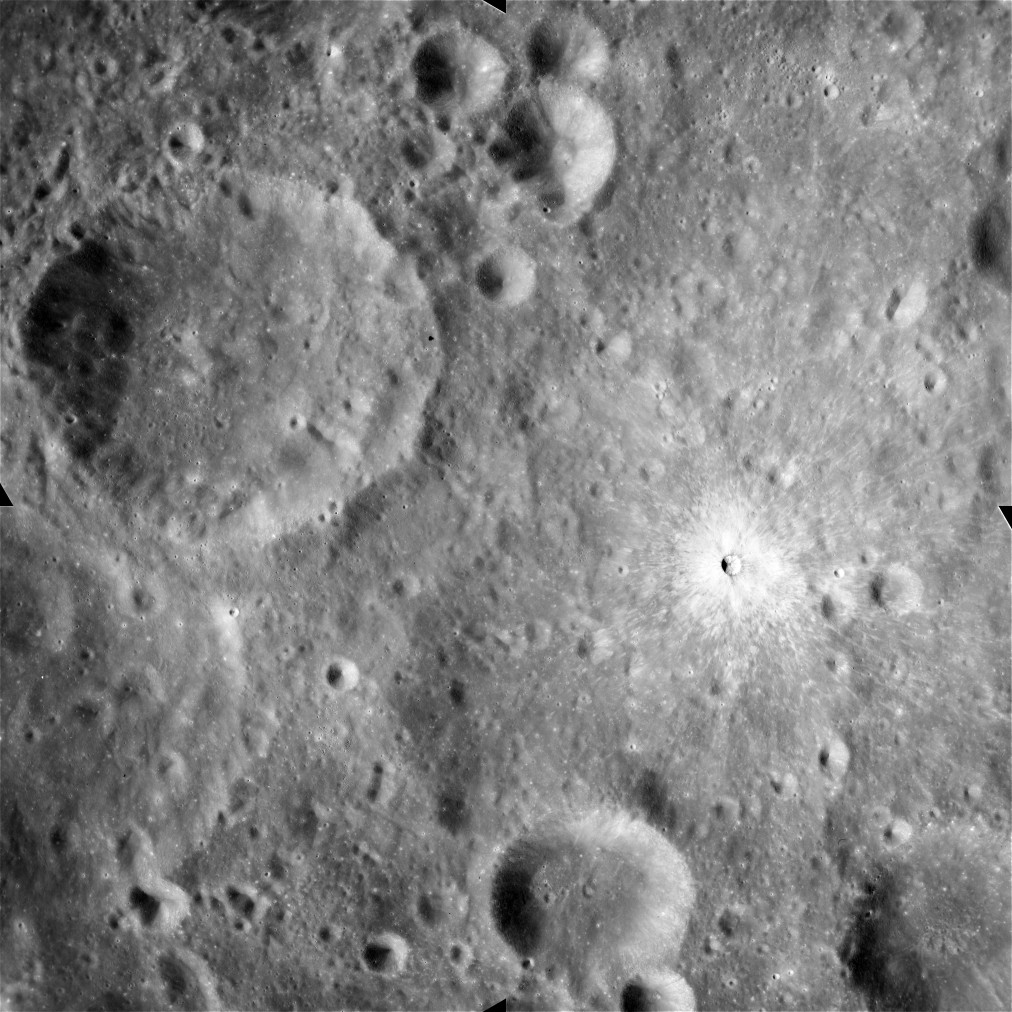
Apollo 15 image showing Denning to the upper left. Note the high-albedo crater at right center. NASA photo.

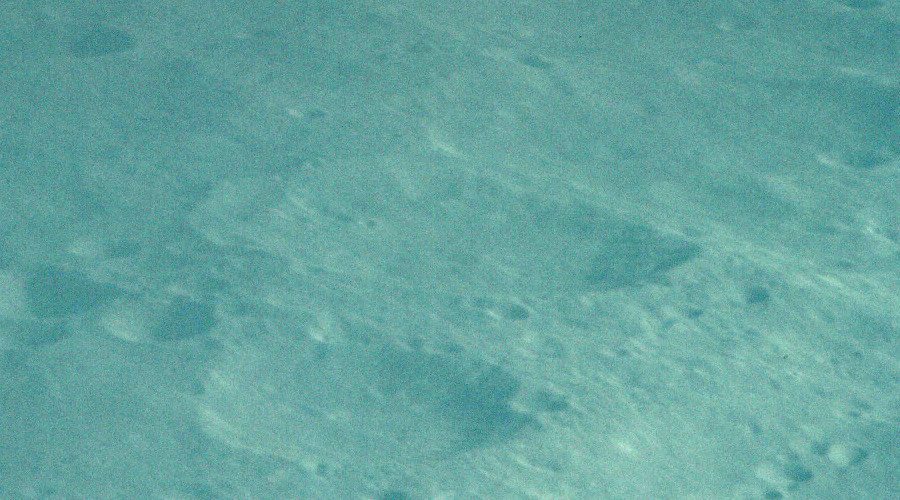
Oblique view from Apollo 13

Denning is a lunar impact crater that is located on the far side of the Moon. It lies about midway between the craters Levi-Civita to the south and Marconi to the north-northeast. About two crater diameters to the southeast is the huge walled plain called Gagarin.

The rim of this worn crater is circular but somewhat irregular-edged. There is a low central rise at the midpoint consisting of at least two hills. Attached to the southwest outer rim is the larger satellite crater Denning R. About one crater diameter the southeast of Denning is a bright patch of high-albedo surface. This patch was most likely created by a small, relatively recent impact.

This crater is named after British astronomer William F. Denning (1848–1931). Its designation was formally adopted by the International Astronomical Union in 1970.

== Satellite craters ==
By convention these features are identified on lunar maps by placing the letter on the side of the crater midpoint that is closest to Denning.

| Denning | Latitude | Longitude | Diameter |
|---|---|---|---|
| B | 15.2° S | 143.5° E | 32 km |
| C | 14.5° S | 145.3° E | 17 km |
| D | 16.1° S | 144.1° E | 14 km |
| L | 18.8° S | 143.2° E | 21 km |
| R | 17.2° S | 141.2° E | 72 km |
| U | 16.0° S | 138.6° E | 30 km |
| V | 15.5° S | 139.7° E | 26 km |
| Y | 14.0° S | 142.3° E | 52 km |
| Z | 12.9° S | 142.5° E | 14 km |
