= Pirquet (crater) =

Lunar crater

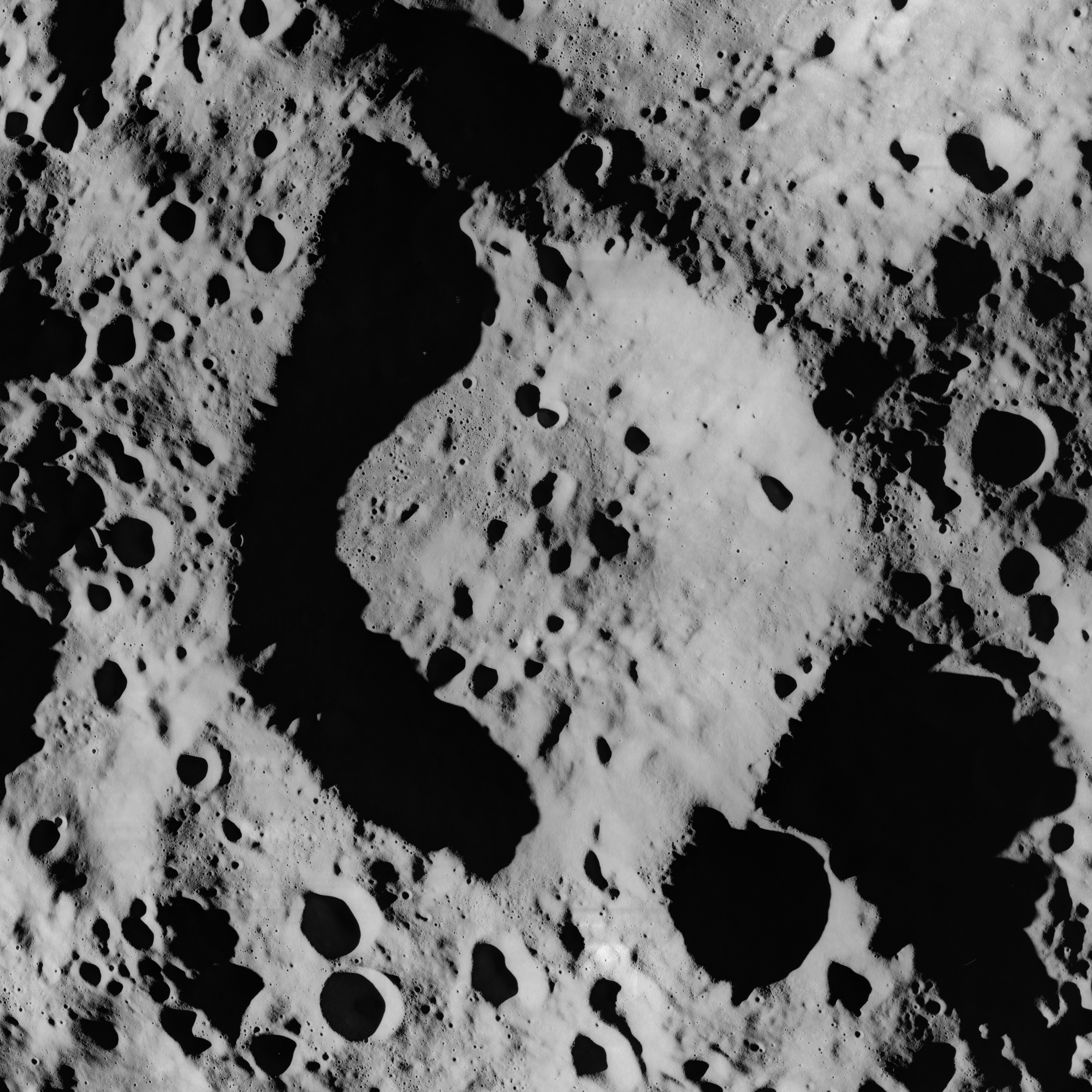
- Apollo 17 image
- Coordinates: 20.3°S 139.6°E
- Diameter: 65 km
- Depth: Unknown
- Colongitude: 221° at sunrise
- Eponym: Guido von Pirquet

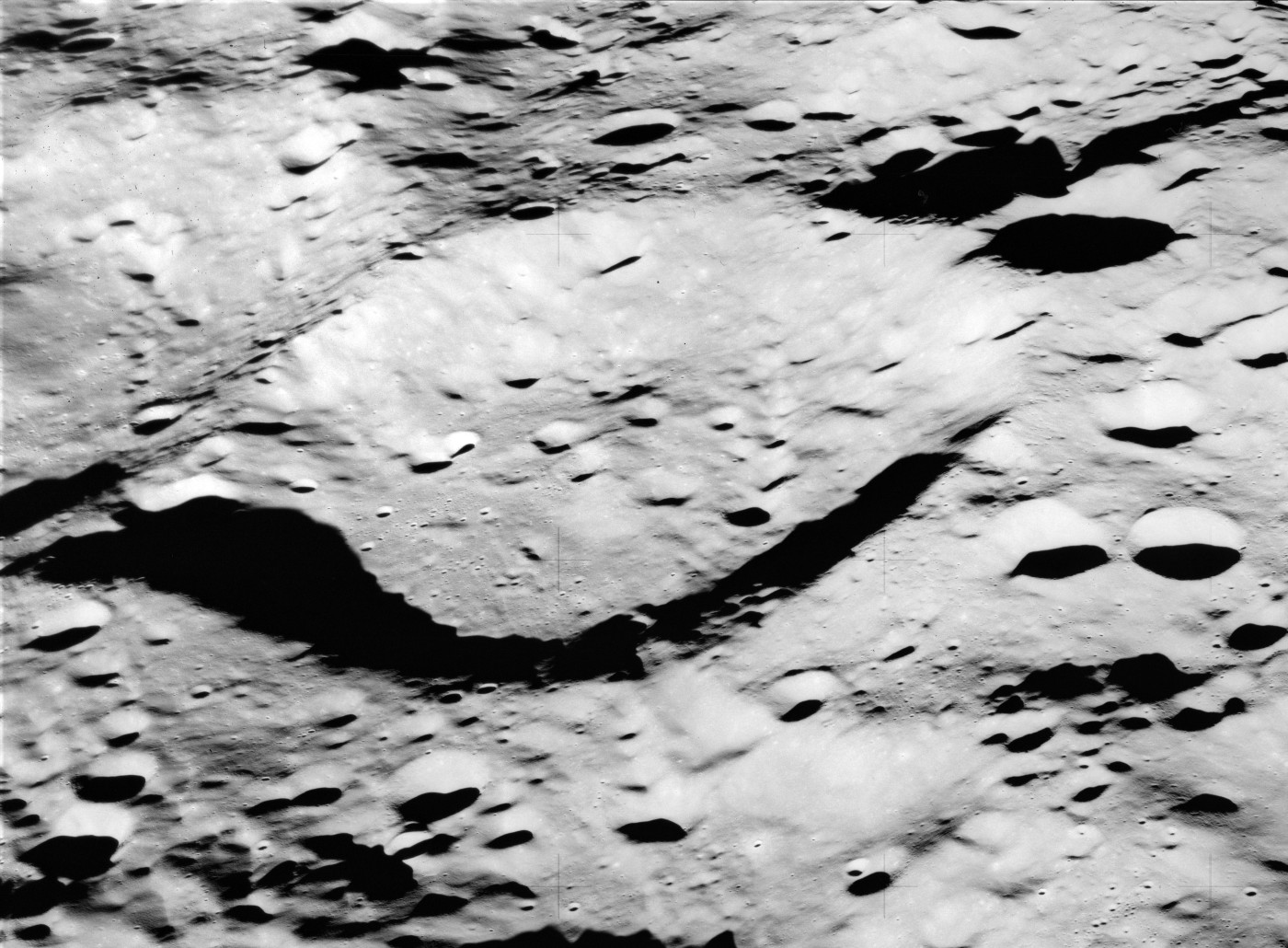
Oblique view facing east from Apollo 15

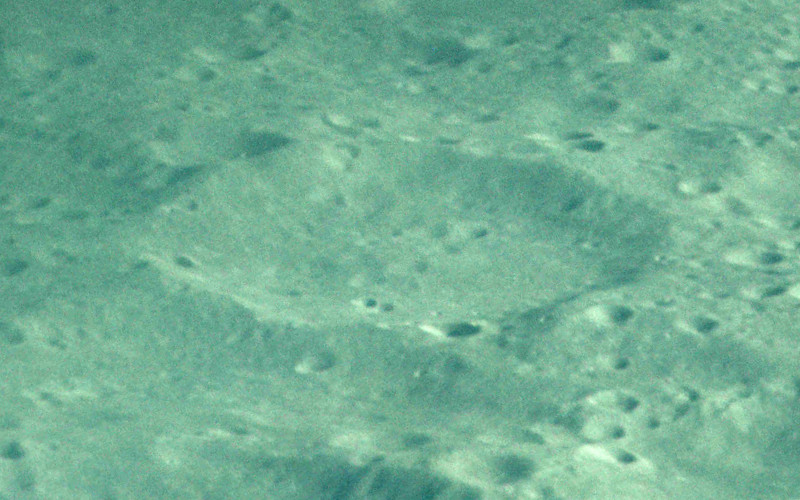
Oblique Apollo 13 image

Pirquet is an eroded lunar impact crater that lies to the northwest of the larger crater Levi-Civita, on the far side of the Moon. About three crater diameters to the west is the prominent Tsiolkovskiy. To the north-northeast of Pirquet is Denning.

The degraded rim and interior of Pirquet are marked by a number of small craterlets. A small crater is protruding into the inner wall along the south-southeastern side. This crater is slightly elongated along the east–west direction, making it appear slightly oval.

== Satellite craters ==
By convention these features are identified on lunar maps by placing the letter on the side of the crater midpoint that is closest to Pirquet.

Pirquet	Latitude	Longitude	Diameter
S	20.6° S	137.7° E	30 km
X	17.2° S	138.5° E	17 km
