= Balandin (crater) =

Crater on the Moon

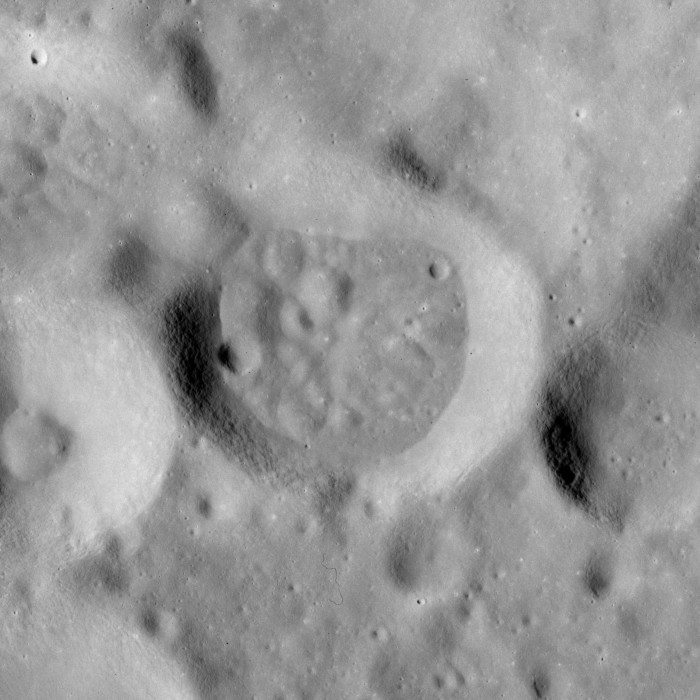
- Apollo 15 image
- Coordinates: 18.9°S 152.6°E
- Diameter: 11.81 km (7.34 mi)
- Depth: Unknown
- Colongitude: 208° at sunrise
- Eponym: Aleksei A. Balandin

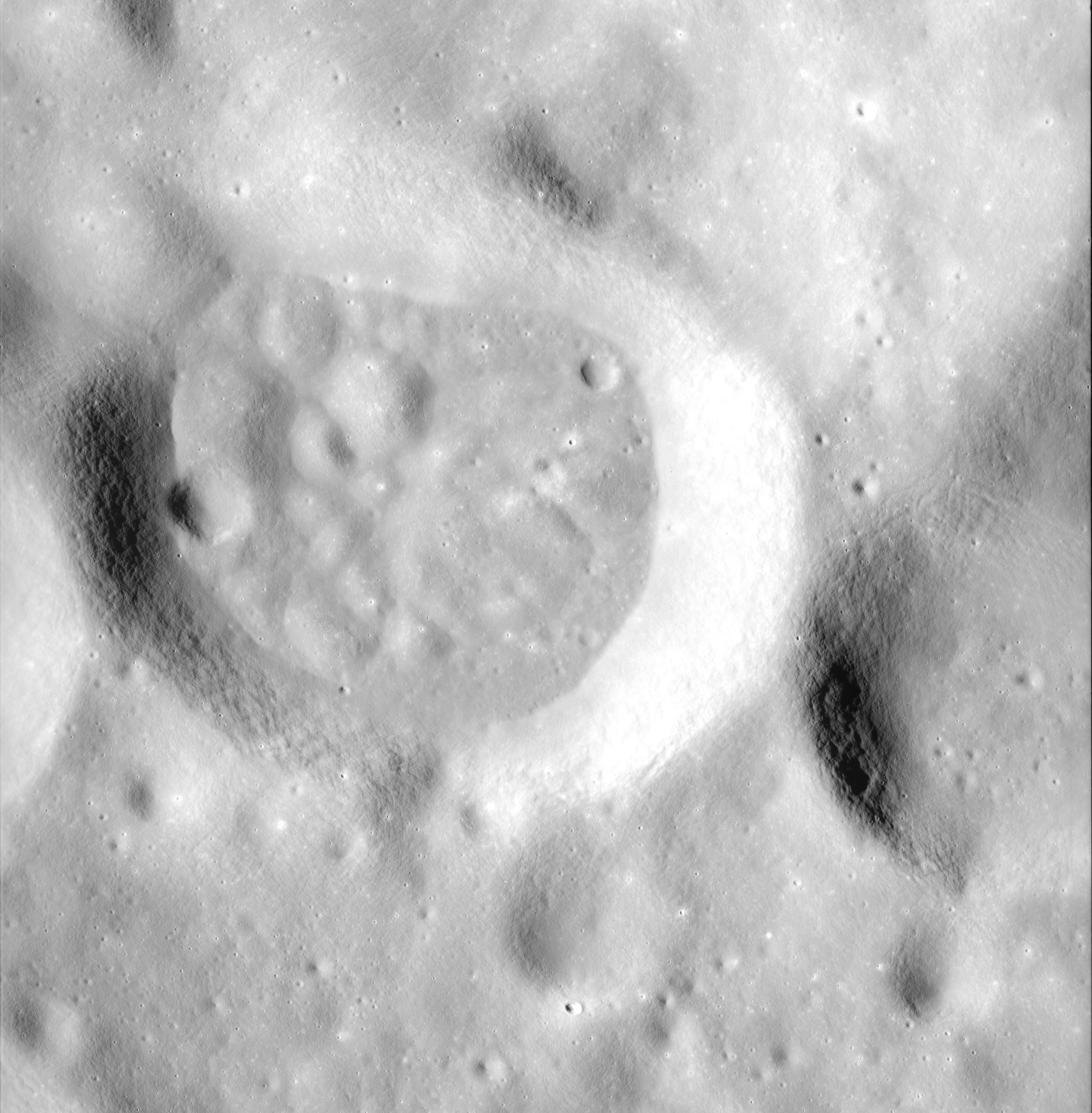
Slightly oblique Apollo 15 image

Balandin is a small crater that is located on the far side of the Moon. It lies within the large walled plain Gagarin, close to the eastern rim.

Balandin is circular with a somewhat unusual hummocky interior floor, similar to the nearby Kosberg, to Barbier F within Barbier, or to Van den Bos. It is adjacent to slightly smaller (unnamed) craters to the east and west.

This crater is named after Soviet chemist Aleksei A. Balandin (1898-1967). Its designation was formally adopted by the International Astronomical Union in 1976.
