= Franciszek Armiński =

Polish astronomer

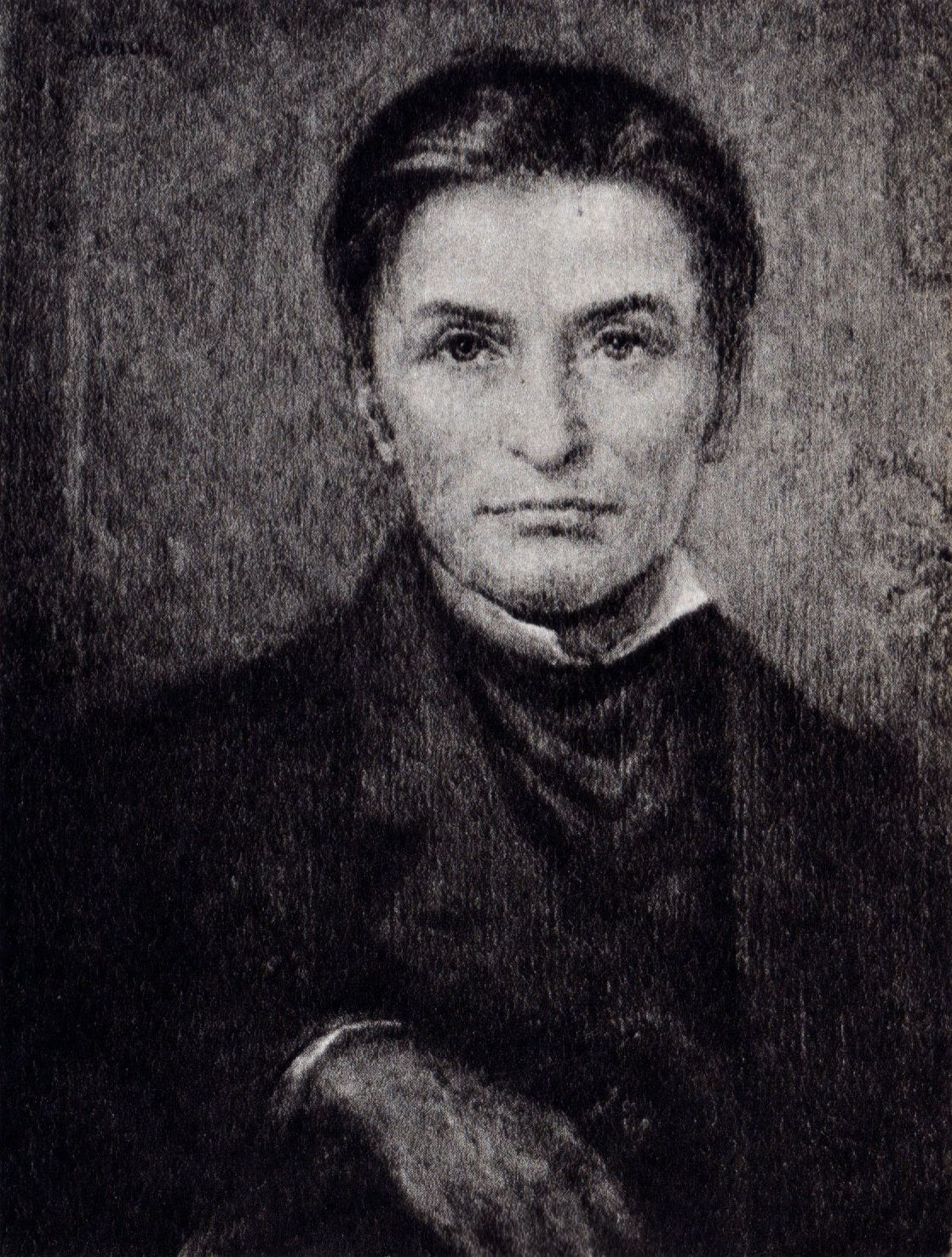
Franciszek Armiński

Franciszek Armiński (born October 2, 1789, in Tymbark – January 14, 1848 in Warsaw) was a Polish astronomer.

He was professor at the Warsaw University and director of the astronomical observatory in Łazienki Park, Warsaw. He studied many astronomical acts and predicted space theories.

The lunar crater Armiński was named after him in 1976.
