= Grave (crater) =

Crater on the Moon

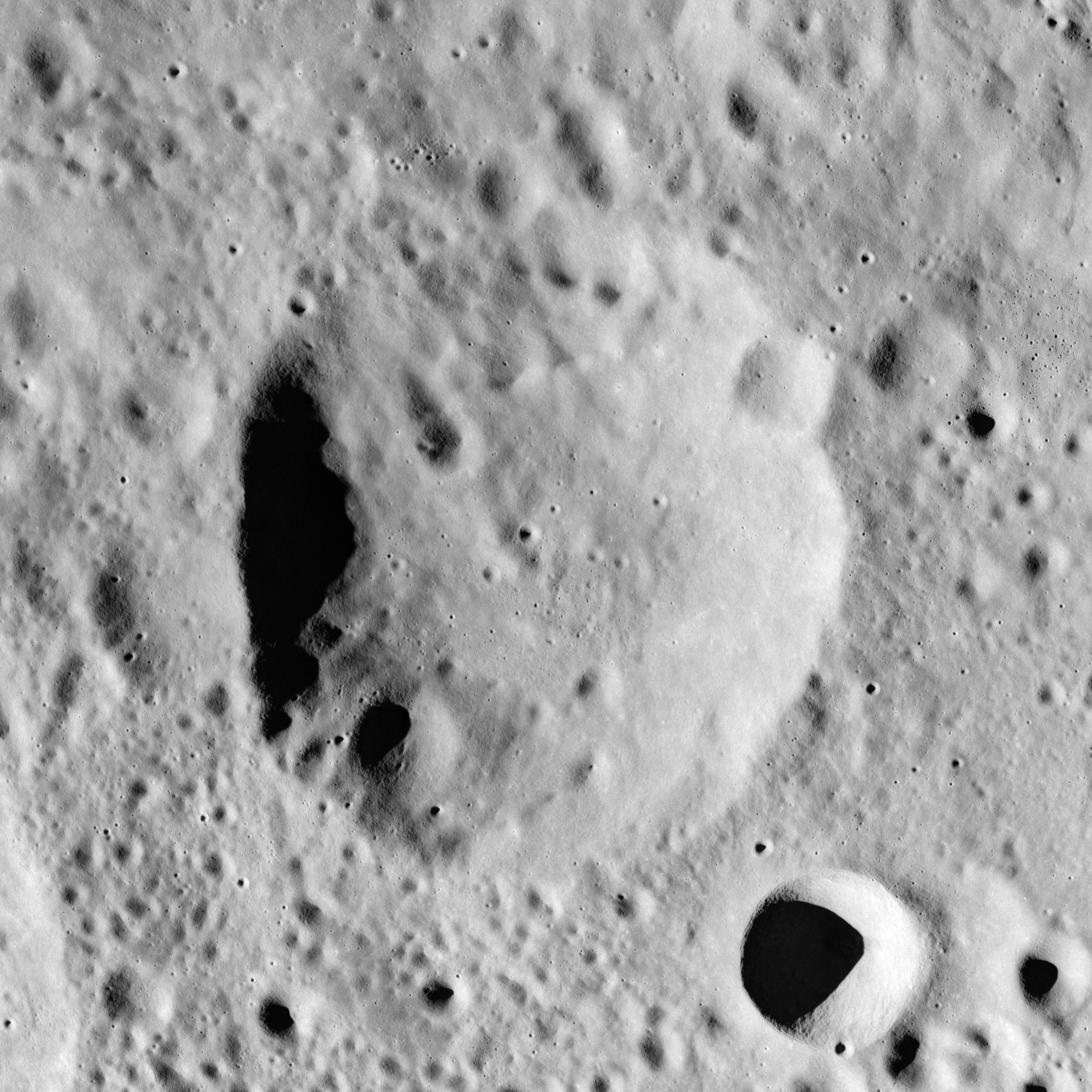
- Apollo 17 image
- Coordinates: 17.1°S 150.3°E
- Diameter: 40 km
- Depth: Unknown
- Colongitude: 210° at sunrise
- Eponym: Dmitriy A. Grave; Ivan P. Grave

Grave is a lunar impact crater that lies in the northern interior floor of a huge walled plain called Gagarin, on the far side of the Moon. It is located about 10 kilometers to the east-northeast of the larger crater Isaev, which covers the northwestern part of Gagarin's interior.

Like many lunar craters, Grave has undergone some erosion due to subsequent impacts. There are small craters across the east and southwestern sides of the circular rim. There is a low rise near the midpoint of the interior.
