= 1772 Gagarin =

Main-belt asteroid

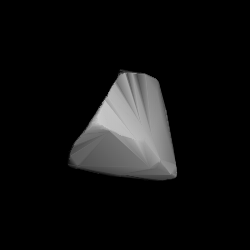
- Shape model of Gagarin from its lightcurve

Discovery
- Discovered by: L. Chernykh
- Discovery site: Crimean Astrophysical Obs.
- Discovery date: 6 February 1968

Designations
- Named after: Yuri Gagarin (cosmonaut)
- Alternative designations: 1968 CB · 1940 GA; 1942 VZ · 1948 ET; 1960 FH · 1969 OO
- Minor planet category: main-belt · (middle)

Orbital characteristics
- Epoch 4 September 2017 (JD 2458000.5)
- Uncertainty parameter 0
- Observation arc: 76.21 yr (27,835 days)
- Aphelion: 2.7924 AU
- Perihelion: 2.2610 AU
- Semi-major axis: 2.5267 AU
- Eccentricity: 0.1051
- Orbital period (sidereal): 4.02 yr (1,467 days)
- Mean anomaly: 90.345°
- Mean motion: 0° 14^{m} 43.44^{s} / day
- Inclination: 5.7423°
- Longitude of ascending node: 88.181°
- Argument of perihelion: 93.442°

Physical characteristics
- Dimensions: 8.00 km (derived); 8.838±0.644; 9.634±0.105 km
- Synodic rotation period: 10.93791±0.00005 h 10.94130±0.00005 h 10.9430±0.0049 h 10.96 h
- Geometric albedo: 0.1380±0.0085; 0.164±0.039; 0.20 (assumed)
- Spectral type: L · S B–V = 0.920
- Absolute magnitude (H): 12.626±0.002 (R) · 12.7 · 12.80±0.45 · 12.85

1772 Gagarin (prov. designation: 1968 CB) is a stony background asteroid from the central region of the asteroid belt, approximately 9 kilometers in diameter. It was discovered on 6 February 1968, by Russian astronomer Lyudmila Chernykh at the Crimean Astrophysical Observatory in Nauchnyj, on the Crimean Peninsula. The asteroid was named after cosmonaut Yuri Gagarin.

== Orbit and classification ==
Gagarin orbits the Sun in the central main-belt at a distance of 2.3–2.8 AU once every 4.02 years (1,467 days). Its orbit has an eccentricity of 0.11 and an inclination of 6° with respect to the ecliptic. Gagarin first observation is a precovery that was taken at Turku Observatory in 1940, extending the body's observation arc by 28 years prior to its official discovery observation.

== Physical characteristics ==
Gagarin has been characterized as a rare L-type asteroid by PanSTARRS' photometric survey.

=== Rotation period ===
In February 1984, a rotational lightcurve of Gagarin obtained by American astronomer Richard P. Binzel gave a rotation period of 10.96 hours with a brightness variation of 0.24 magnitude (U=2). Photometric observations at the Californian Palomar Transient Factory in December 2011, gave a 10.9430 hours with an amplitude of 0.41 (U=2). in 2001 and 2016, additional lightcurve were obtained from modeled photometric data, giving a period of 10.94130 and 10.93791 hours (U=n.a.).

=== Diameter and albedo ===
According to the survey carried out by NASA's Wide-field Infrared Survey Explorer with its subsequent NEOWISE mission, Gagarin measures between 8.83 and 9.63 kilometers in diameter, and its surface has an albedo between 0.138 and 0.164, The Collaborative Asteroid Lightcurve Link assumes a standard albedo of 0.20 and derives a diameter of 8.00 kilometers with an absolute magnitude of 12.85.

== Naming ==
This minor planet was named for Russian–Soviet cosmonaut Yuri Gagarin (1934–1968), Hero of the Soviet Union and first human to journey into outer space by circumnavigating Earth in 1961. Gagarin died in a jet fighter crash in 1968, the year the asteroid was discovered. The lunar crater Gagarin is also named in his honor. The official naming citation was published by the Minor Planet Center on 25 September 1971 (M.P.C. 3185).

== See also ==
- Gagarin (crater)
