= Daniel Barbier =

French astronomer (1907–1965)

Daniel Barbier (10 December 1907 – 1 April 1965) was a French astronomer born in Lyon.

Between 1930 and 1965 he published nearly 100 scientific papers on astronomy. Among his works were studies of stellar atmospheres and lunar occultations and eclipses. He performed studies of the upper atmosphere, Aurora Borealis, the zodiacal light and the night airglow.

His name remains associated to the famous Eddington-Barbier relationships of analytical radiative transfer (see Barbier 1943 and Paletou 2018).

== Honors ==
- The lunar crater Barbier was named after him in 1970.
- Asteroid 37853 Danielbarbier, discovered by Eric Elst at La Silla Observatory in 1998, was named in his honor. The official naming citation was published by the Minor Planet Center on 5 October 2017 (M.P.C. 106501).

== Bibliography ==
- Vigroux, Ernest (1999). "Necrologia: Daniel Barbier". Ciel et Terre. 81: 137. Bibcode:1965C&T....81..137V.
- D. H. Menzel; M. Minnaert; B. Levin; A. Dollfus; B. Bell (1971). "Report on Lunar Nomenclature by The Working Group of Commission 17 of the IAU". Space Science Reviews. 12 (2): 136. Bibcode:1971SSRv...12..136M. doi:10.1007/BF00171763. S2CID 122125855.
- F. Paletou (2018). "On Milne-Barbier-Unsöld relationships". Open Astronomy. 27 (1): 76–79. arXiv:1711.07026. Bibcode:2018OAst...27...76P. doi:10.1515/astro-2018-0018. S2CID 54705194.
