= Semyon Kosberg =

Soviet engineer

Semyon Ariyevich Kosberg
- Born: 1 October 1903; Slutsk, Minsk Governorate, Russian Empire
- Died: 3 January 1965 (aged 61); Voronezh, Soviet Union
- Education: Leningrad Polytechnic Institute, Moscow Aviation Institute
- Engineering career
- Discipline: Aerospace Engineering
- Employer: Baranov Central Institute of Aviation Motor Development

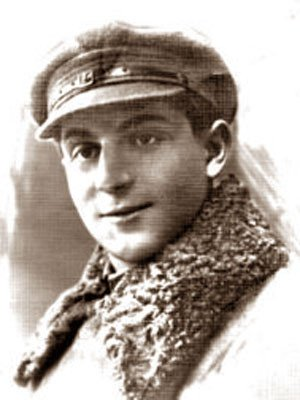
Semyon Kosberg

Semyon Ariyevich Kosberg (Семён А́риевич Ко́сберг in Russian) (October 1(14), 1903, Slutsk - January 3, 1965, Voronezh) was a Soviet engineer, expert in the field of aircraft and rocket engines, Doctor of Technical Sciences (1959), Hero of Socialist Labor (1961).

In 1931, Semyon Kosberg graduated from the Moscow Aviation Institute. He then worked in some of the biggest planning organizations of the Soviet aircraft industry. In 1941, Kosberg was appointed chief designer of an aircraft design bureau, later known as OKB-154, which he ran until his death. He is known for his contributions to the creation of aircraft engines, mounted on the Lavochkin La-5, Lavochkin La-7, and other mass wartime aircraft. In 1946-1965, Kosberg supervised the development of a series of liquid fuel rocket engines, which would be mounted on the final stages of carrier rockets and put into orbit piloted spacecraft, satellites, and interplanetary automatic space stations.

Semyon Kosberg was awarded the Lenin Prize (1960), Order of Lenin, three other orders and different medals. A crater on the far side of the Moon is named after him.
