= Kosberg (crater) =

Crater on the Moon

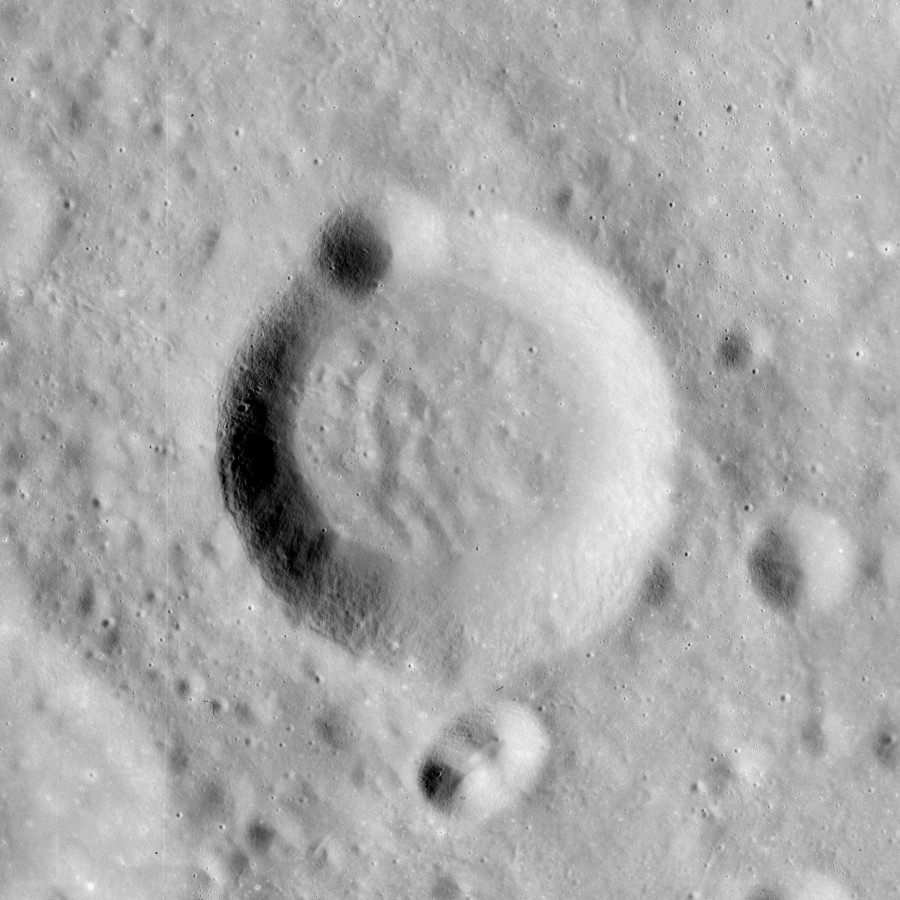
- Apollo 15 image
- Coordinates: 20.2°S 149.6°E
- Diameter: 15 km
- Depth: 1.3 km
- Colongitude: 211° at sunrise
- Eponym: Semyon A. Kosberg

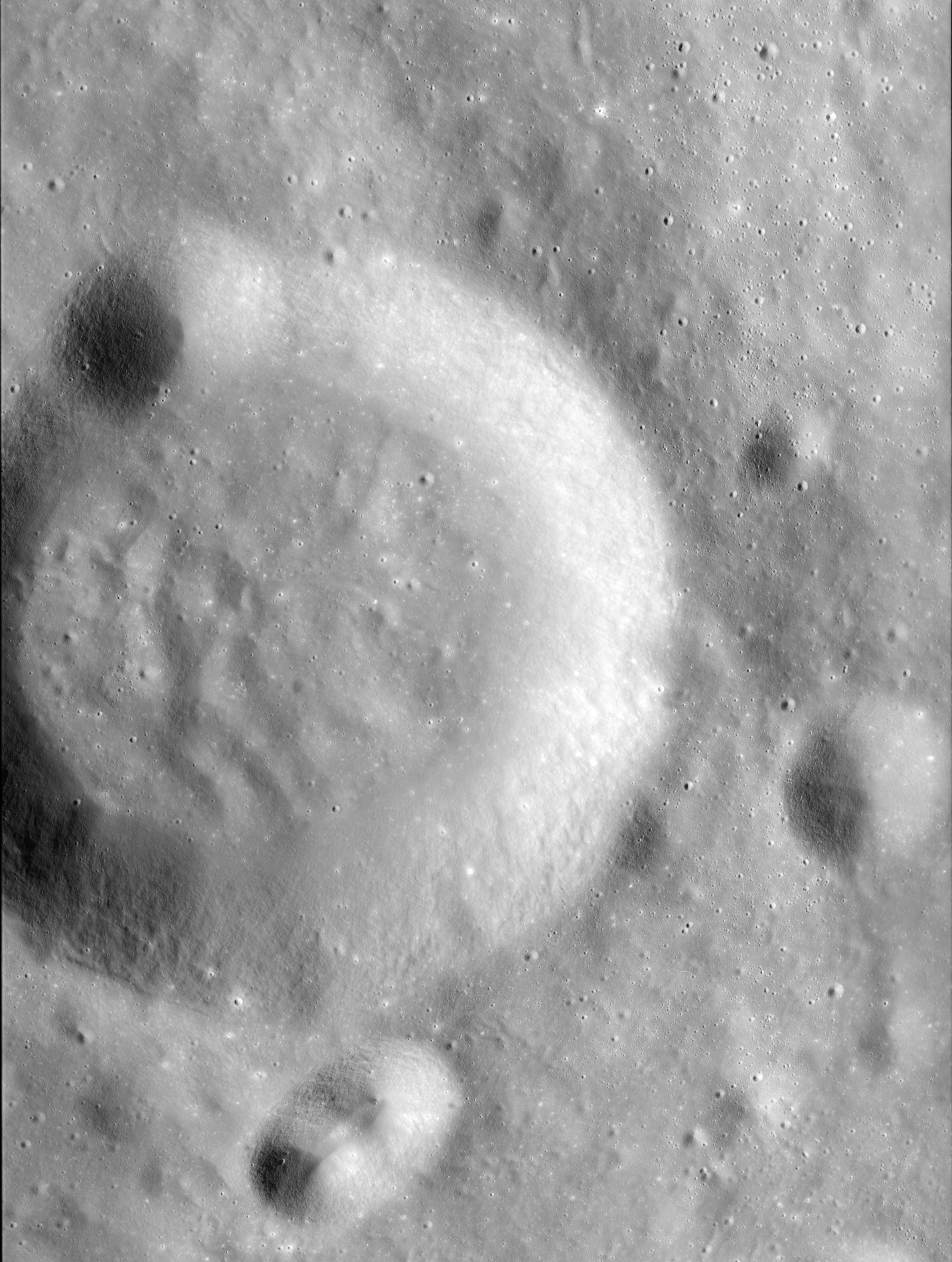
Slightly oblique Apollo 15 image

Kosberg is a small lunar impact crater that is located near the middle of a huge walled plain named Gagarin, which lies on the far side of the Moon and cannot be viewed directly from the Earth. Kosberg is a flat-bottomed crater with a circular outer rim, simple sloping inner walls, and a somewhat hummocky interior floor. Kosberg also lies just to the west of a similarly sized, but deeper and more prominent bowl-shaped crater, Gagarin G.

The nearby crater Balandin (to the northeast and within Gagarin) also has a hummocky floor.
