= The Grave =

The Grave may refer to:

== Film ==
- The Grave (1996 film), a thriller film
- The Grave (2020 film), a film by Gazi Rakayet

== TV series ==
- The Grave (Graven), a 2004 Swedish TV series starring Eva Melander
- The Grave (TV series), a 2019 Israeli science fiction TV show.
- "The Grave" (The Twilight Zone), a 1961 episode of The Twilight Zone

== Other uses ==
- The Grave (play), a play by Munier Choudhury
- The Grave (poem), a poem by Scottish poet Robert Blair
- The Grave (novel), a 1997 novel by James Heneghan
- "The Grave", a song from Don McLean's album American Pie

== See also ==
- Grave (disambiguation)
- Graves (disambiguation)
- The Graves (disambiguation)
