= Cyrano (crater) =

Lunar impact crater

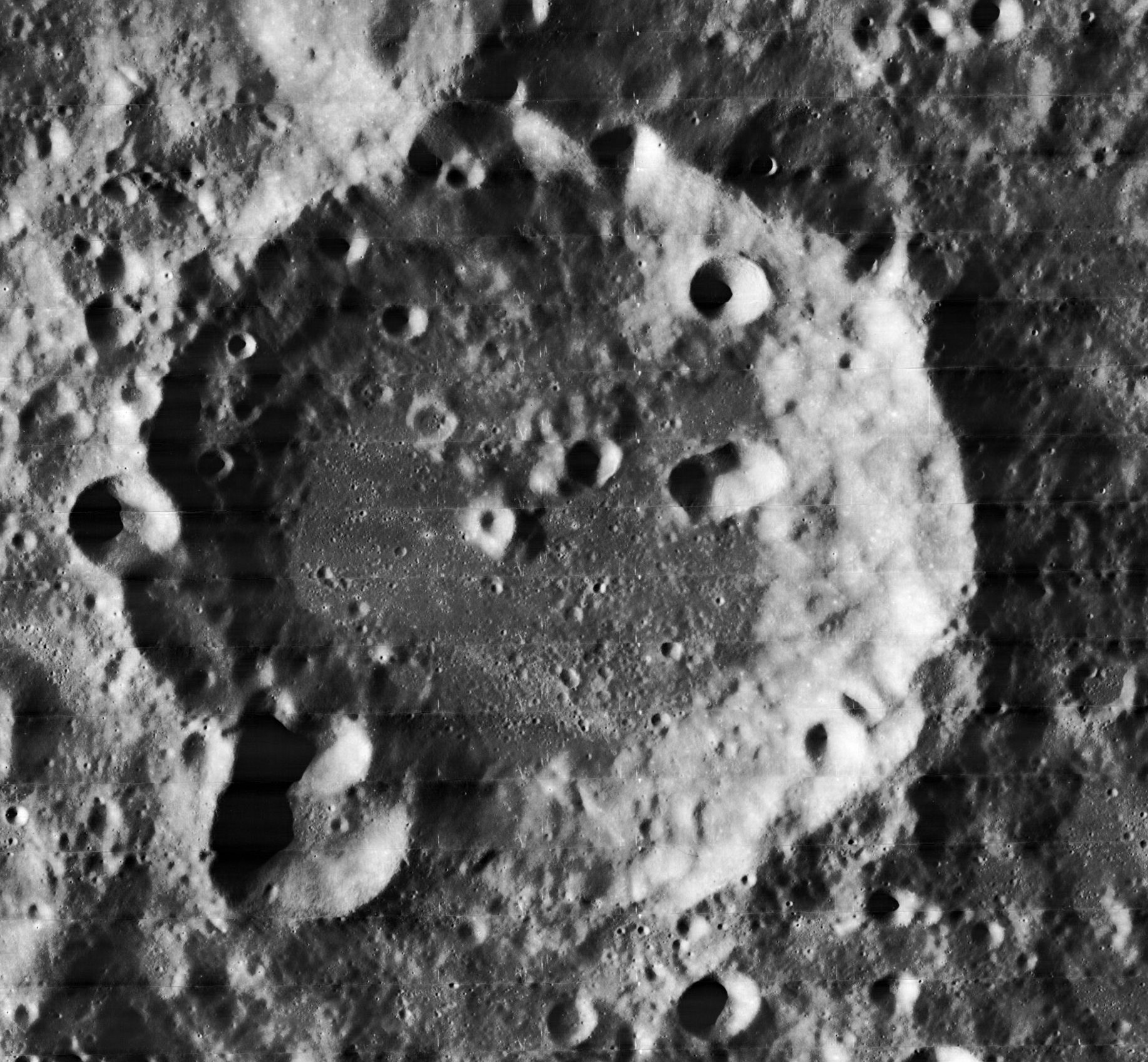
- Lunar Orbiter 2 image
- Coordinates: 20.5°S 157.7°E
- Diameter: 79.58 km (49.45 mi)
- Depth: Unknown
- Colongitude: 204° at sunrise
- Formation: Pre-Nectarian
- Eponym: Cyrano de Bergerac

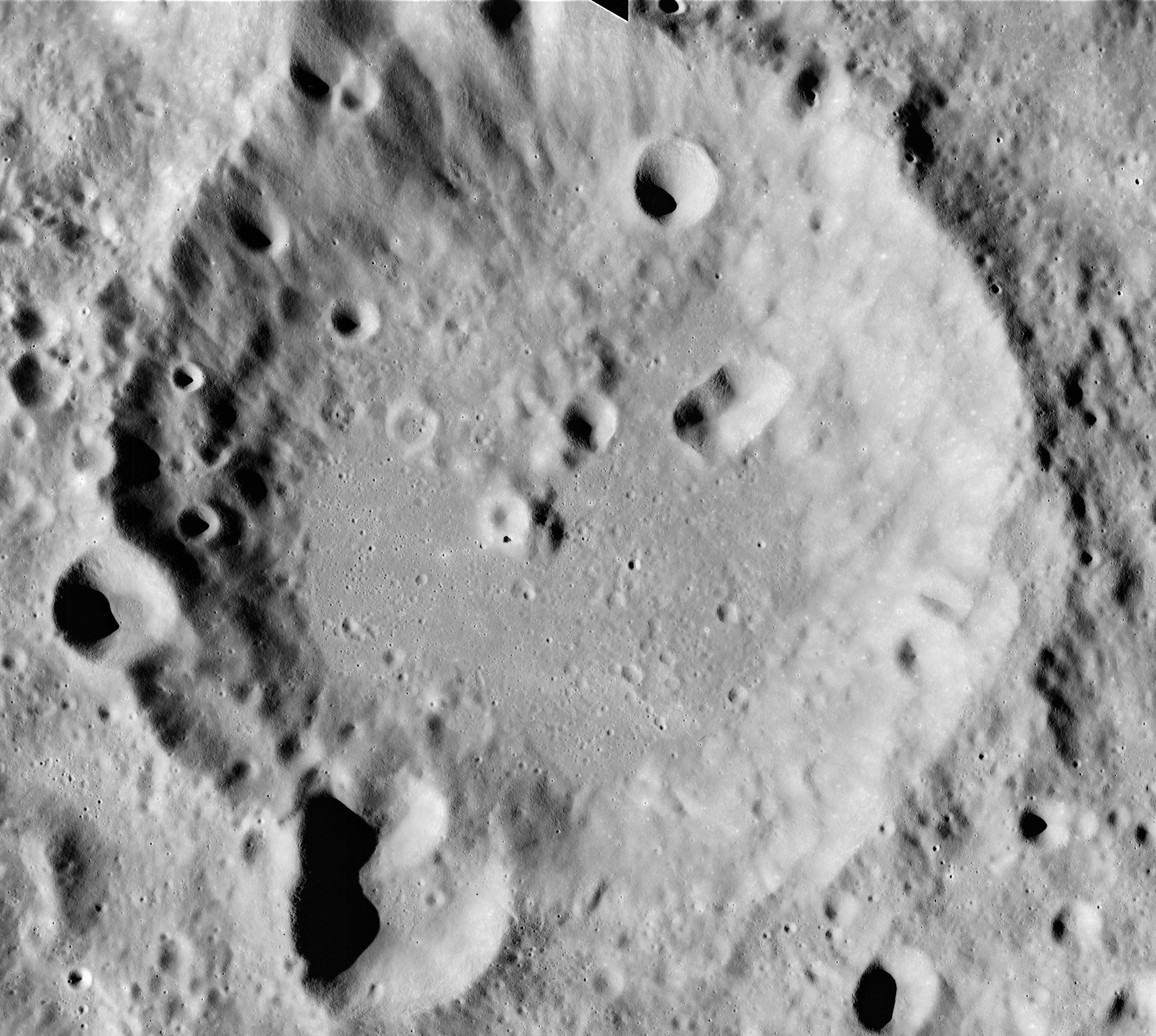
Cyrano from Apollo 15

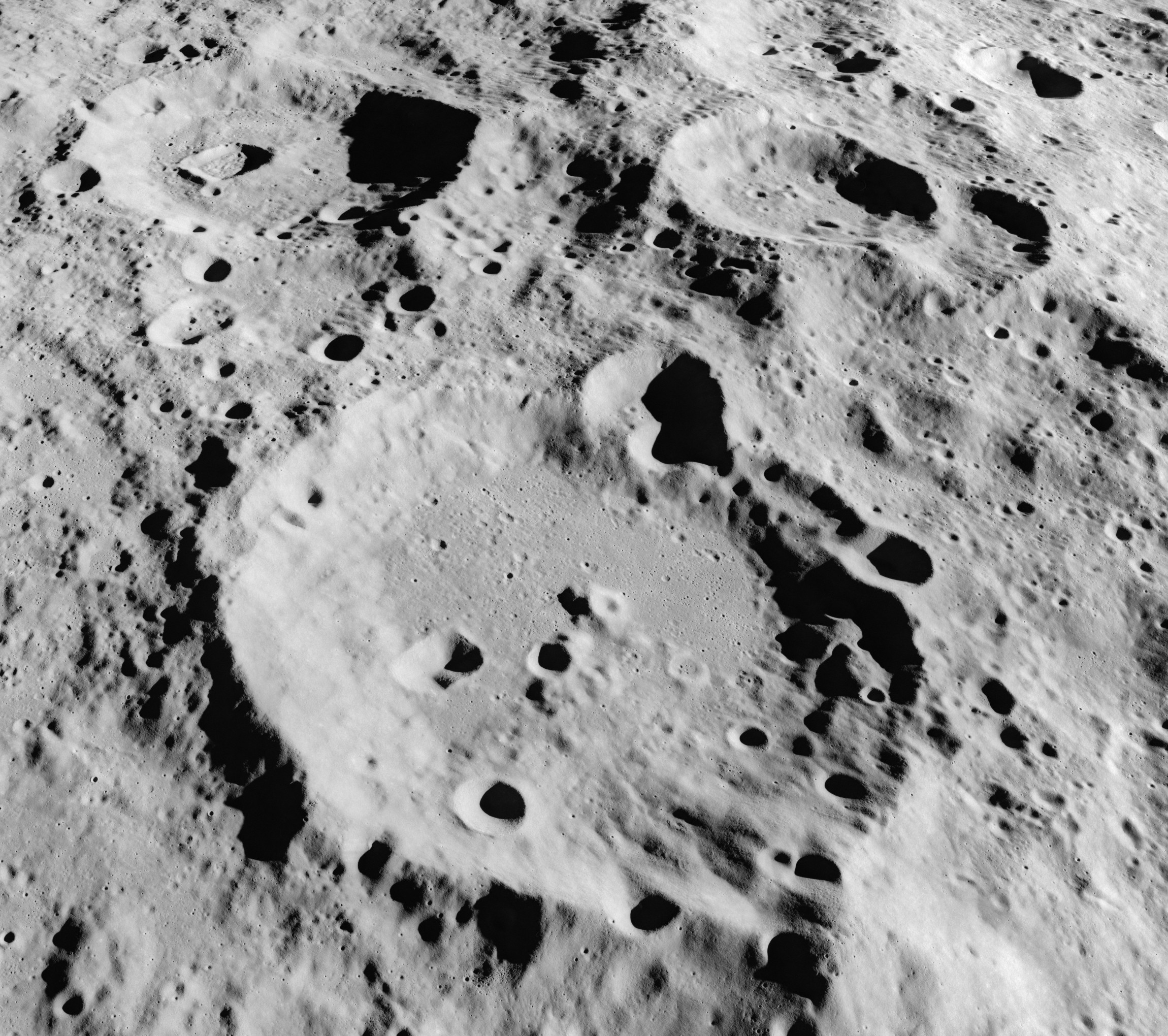
Oblique view of Cyrano from Apollo 17

Cyrano is a worn lunar impact crater that lies on the far side of the Moon. It lies due east of a huge walled plain called Gagarin, and to the north of the somewhat smaller crater Barbier.

On the lunar geologic timescale, this crater dates to the Pre-Nectarian epoch. The most notable aspect of this crater are the small impacts along the western and southwest rim, with the pear-shaped Cyrano P forming the later intrusion into the interior. The remainder of the rim has received some wear, and is particularly eroded at the northern end. The floor has perhaps a relatively thin covering of basaltic lava. There are a few small craters within the interior, with a merged crater pair near the eastern side and a crater along the northeast inner wall. The northern half of the interior floor is slightly more irregular than the southern part.

This crater is named after French author and playwright Cyrano de Bergerac (1615–1655). Its designation was officially adopted by the International Astronomical Union in 1970.

== Satellite craters ==
By convention these features are identified on lunar maps by placing the letter on the side of the crater midpoint that is closest to Cyrano.

Cyrano	Latitude	Longitude	Diameter
A	18.1° S	158.6° E	26 km
B	18.3° S	159.7° E	23 km
D	19.6° S	162.2° E	24 km
E	20.1° S	161.2° E	21 km
P	21.6° S	156.8° E	19 km
