= Aleksei Balandin =

Soviet chemist known for organic catalysis

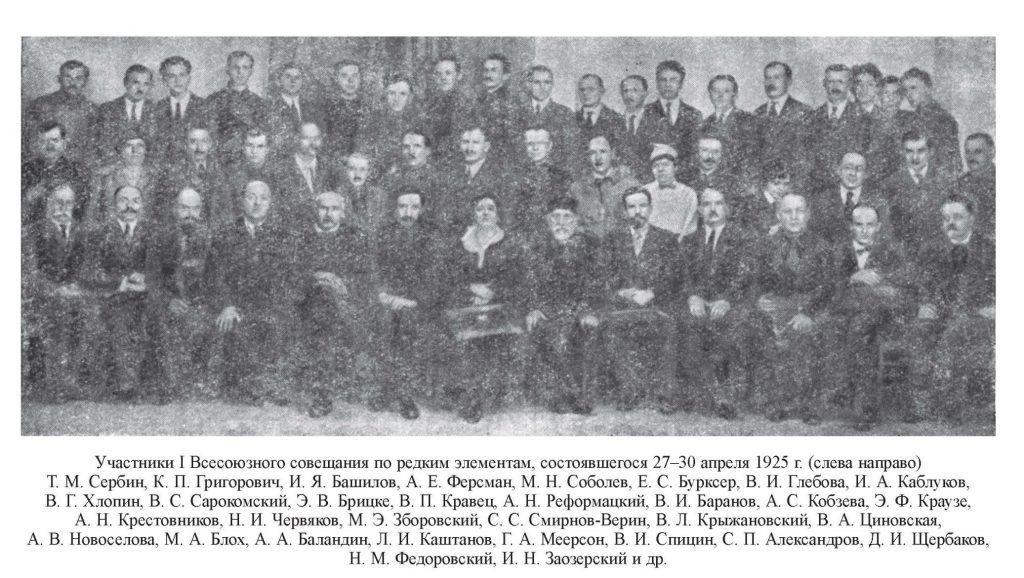
A.A. Balandin at the 1st All-Union Meeting on Rare Elements, 1925

Aleksei Aleksandrovich Balandin (Russian: Алексей Александрович Баландин, December 20, 1898 – May 22, 1967) was a Soviet chemist member of the Academy of Sciences of the Soviet Union. His primary contribution lies in the field of organic catalysis, where is known as the developed of the multiplet theory of catalysis. He is the author of several books, and many scientific papers.

The lunar crater Balandin was named in his honor.

== Publications ==
=== Books ===
- Khlopin, V. G., Balandin, A. A., Pogodin, S. A., & Volʹfkovich, S. I. (1945). Ocherki po istorii Akademii nauk: khimicheskie nauki. Moskva: Izd-vo Akademii nauk SSSR. OCLC 17748200
- Balandin, A. A. (1964). Catalysis and chemical kinetics, by A. A. Balandin [and others]. New York: Academic Press.
- Vsesoi︠u︡znoe soveshchanie po nauchnym osnovam podbora katalizatorov geterogennykh kataliticheskikh reakt︠s︡iĭ, & Balandin, A. A. (1968). Translated as: Scientific selection of catalysts. Problems of kinetics and catalysis, 11. Jerusalem: Israel Program for Scientific Translations. OCLC 434180
- Balandin, A. A. (1964). Catalysis and chemical kinetics. New York: Academic Press. OCLC 769314
- Balandin, A. A., & Klabunovskiĭ, E. I. (1972). Izbrannye trudy. Moskva: "Nauka,".

== Biographical references ==
- Klabunovskiĭ, E. I., & Logunov, A. A. (1984). Alekseĭ Aleksandrovich Balandin. Materially k biobibliografii uchenykh SSSR., vyp. 71. Moskva: Izdvo Akademii nauk SSSR.
- Nesterova, N. M. (1958). Alekseĭ Aleksandrovich Balandin. Materially k biobibliografii uchenykh SSSR., vyp. 28. Moskva: Izd-vo Akademii nauk SSSR.
- Poli︠a︡kova, N. B., & Klabunovskiĭ, E. I. (1984). Alekseĭ Aleksandrovic̊ Balandin, 1898-1967. Moskva: "Nauka".
- Klabunovskiĭ, E. I., Solovʹev, I. I., & Gri︠a︡znov, V. M. (1998). Alekseĭ Aleksandrovich Balandin, 1898-1967. Moskva: "Nauka".
