= Guido von Pirquet =

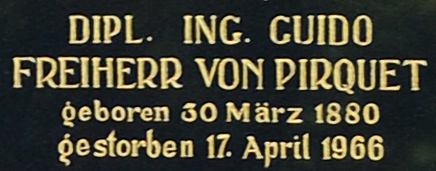
Grave of Guido Freiherr von Pirquet in the Hirschstetten cemetery, Vienna

Guido von Pirquet (30 March 1880 – 17 April 1966) was an Austrian pioneer of astronautics and a Baron of a lower noble family.

Born near Vienna, he was educated at Technische Hochschule in Vienna and Graz. He developed an interest in rocketry, building and testing model rockets in 1927. In 1928, he proposed the idea of building a space station in low Earth orbit (LEO) for fueling vehicles to travel to the other planets. He published detailed calculations for this type of mission. For this reason, he (together with Herman Potočnik) is considered the "father of the space station". Along with Rudolf Zwerina, he founded the Austrian Society for Rocket Technology in 1931. His interest in rocketry waned following the Anschluss in 1938.

Guido von Pirquet is one of several scientists working in the pre-spaceflight era (1920-1957) who fully understood the promise of the gravity assist method for reducing flight time and increasing payload to the outer planets. He gave detailed formulas showing how close passage of Jupiter could be used to make a large change in the velocity and orbital energy of a spacecraft. His vector diagrams clearly show the gravity assist mechanism that are identical to those used later by Krafft Ehricke (1956) and much later by Minovitch (1961). Minovitch claims incorrectly that he is the "inventor" of the gravity assist space flight technique..

Pirquet crater on the Moon is named after him. He was inducted as an honorary fellow of the British Interplanetary Society in 1949, their highest honor. In 1976, he was inducted into the International Space Hall of Fame. His brother, Clemens von Pirquet, became a scientist and pediatrician.

== Publications ==
Pirquet's work was published both by Verein für Raumschiffahrt (the Society for Space Travel) in Die Rackete and by Willy Ley in Die Möglichkeit der Weltraumfahrt (The Possibility of Space Travel).
