= Barbier (crater) =

Lunar impact crater

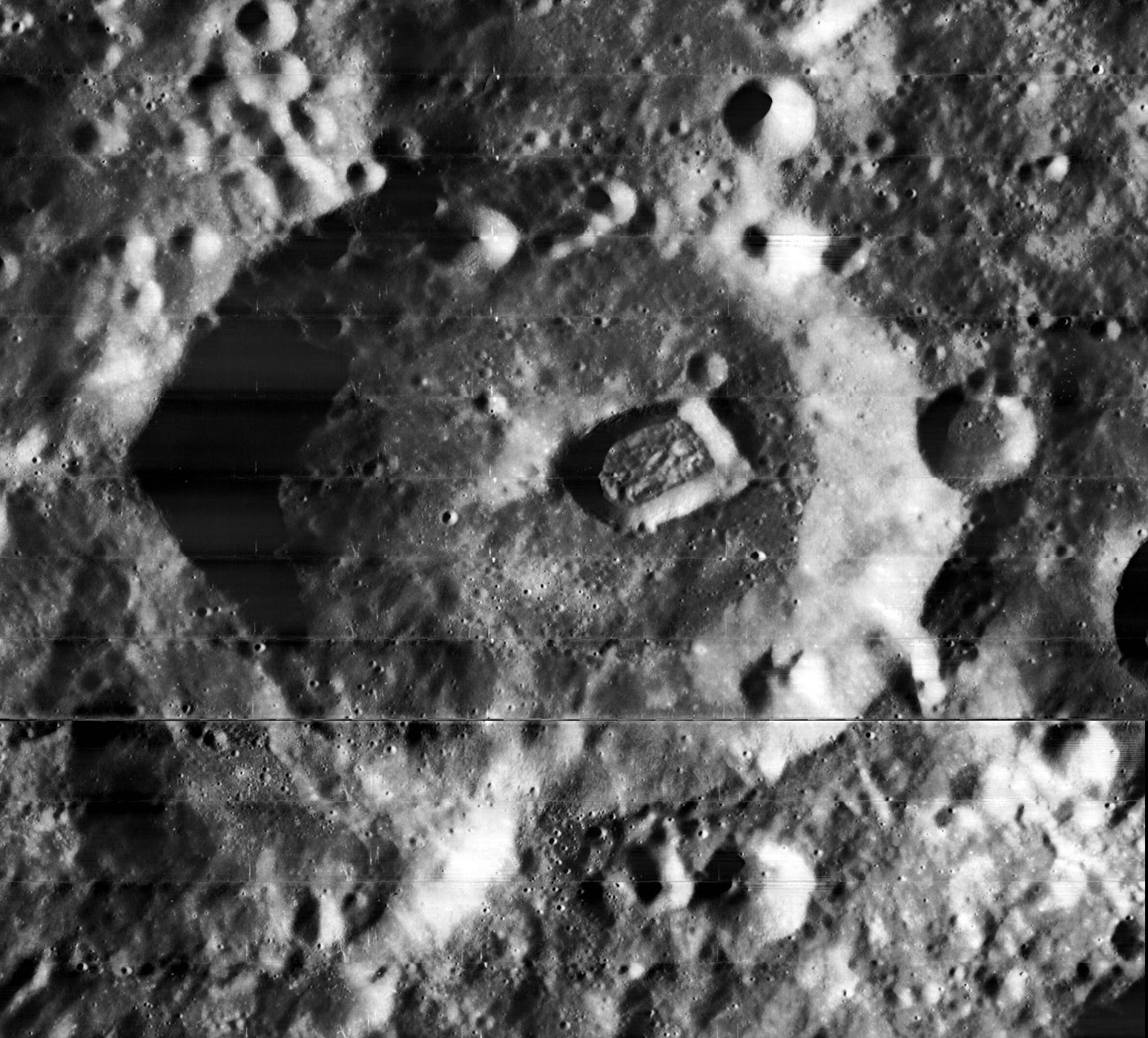
- Lunar Orbiter 2 image
- Coordinates: 23.8°S 157.9°E
- Diameter: 65.38 km (40.63 mi)
- Depth: Unknown
- Colongitude: 204° at sunrise
- Formation: Pre-Nectarian
- Eponym: Daniel Barbier

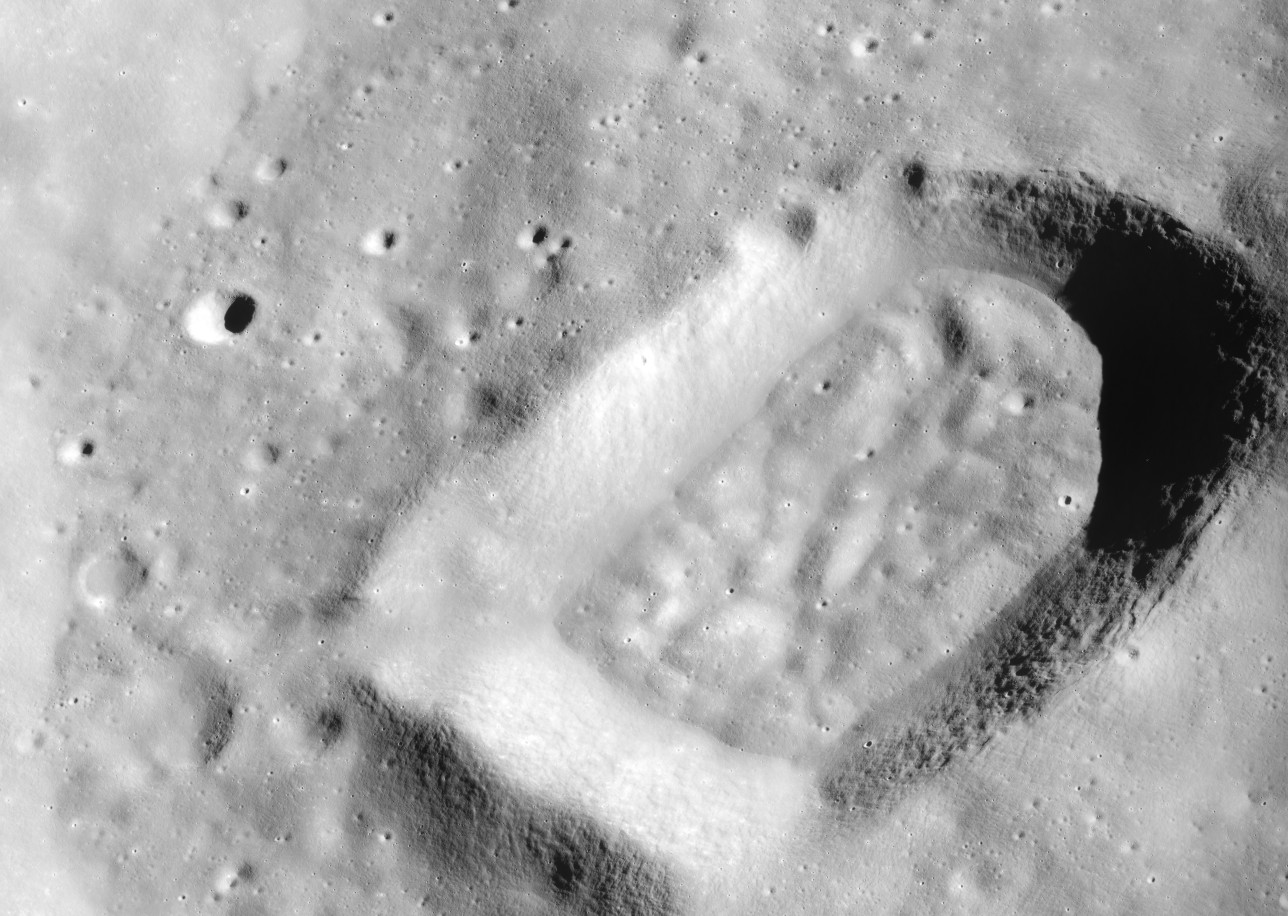
Barbier F, in the interior of Barbier, from Apollo 15 panoramic camera

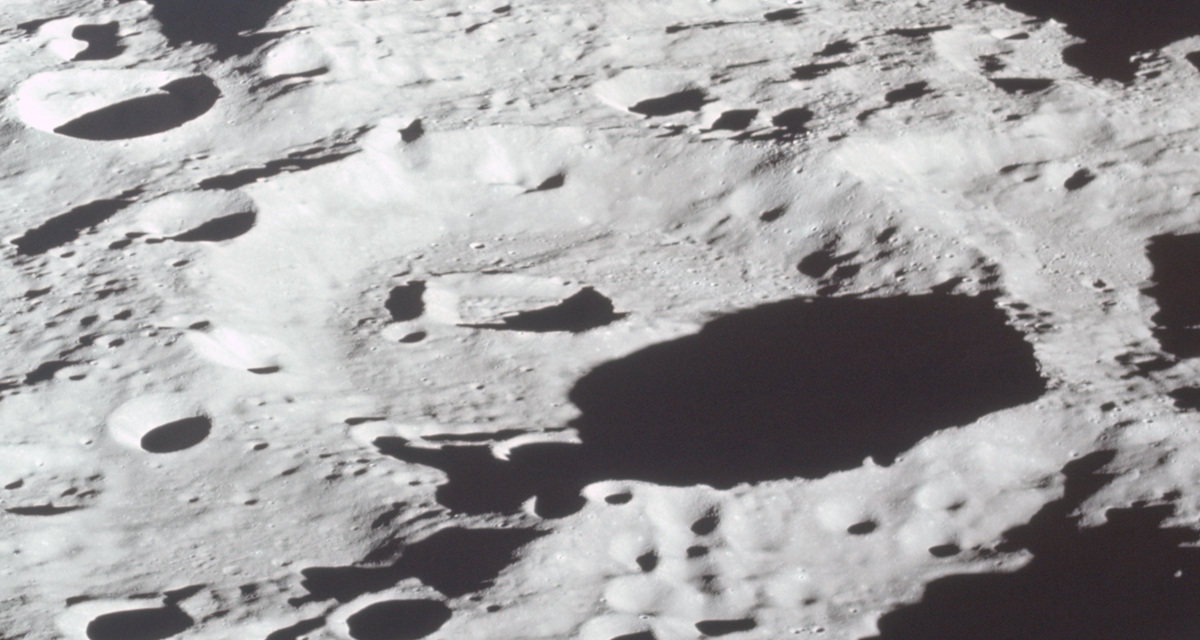
Oblique view facing southeast from Apollo 17

Barbier is a lunar impact crater that is located on the southern hemisphere on the far side of the Moon. It is located close to the western edge of the South Pole-Aitken basin. Barbier forms a matched pair with Cyrano to the north-northwest, and it lies to the southeast of Gagarin, a huge walled plain. Southwest of Barbier is the crater Sierpinski, and to the southeast is the Mare Ingenii.

On the lunar geologic timescale, this crater dates to the Pre-Nectarian epoch. The outer rim of Barbier has been eroded somewhat by subsequent impacts, particularly at the north end where the wall has been degraded by several small craterlets. A small crater lies across the eastern rim, and the southern rim is wider and irregular in shape. An unusual irregular crater (Barbier F) with a hummocky floor, approximately 16 km long, lies near where a central peak would be located, offset to the east of the midpoint.

This crater is named after French astronomer Daniel Barbier (1907–1965). This designation was formally adopted by the International Astronomical Union in 1970.

== Satellite craters ==
By convention these features are identified on lunar maps by placing the letter on the side of the crater midpoint that is closest to Barbier.

Barbier	Latitude	Longitude	Diameter
F	23.8° S	158.1° E	14 km
D	23.0° S	160.2° E	24 km
G	24.4° S	160.1° E	17 km
H	25.3° S	160.5° E	17 km
J	26.0° S	160.1° E	43 km
K	26.5° S	159.4° E	7 km
U	22.8° S	155.1° E	38 km
V	22.3° S	154.6° E	29 km

== See also ==
- Asteroid 37853 Danielbarbier
