= The Graves =

The Graves may refer to:

- The Graves (band), a band formed by Michale Graves
- The Graves (film), a 2009 film directed by Brian Pulido
- The Graves (Massachusetts), group of rock outcroppings in Massachusetts Bay

== See also ==
- Grave (disambiguation)
- Graves (disambiguation)
- The Grave (disambiguation)
