= Pavlov (crater) =

Crater on the Moon

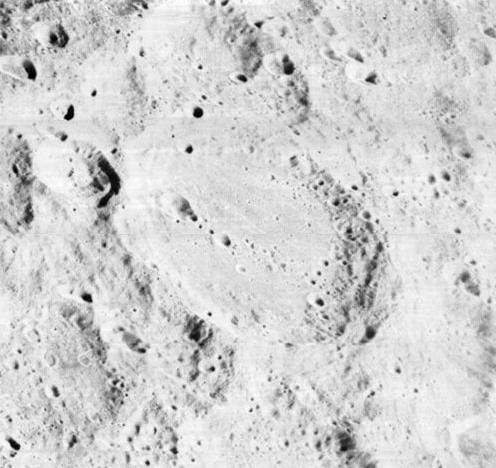
- Oblique Lunar Orbiter 2 image, facing south
- Coordinates: 28.8°S 142.5°E
- Diameter: 143.05 km
- Colongitude: 220° at sunrise
- Eponym: Ivan P. Pavlov

Pavlov is a lunar impact crater on the far side of the Moon, approximately 143 kilometers in diameter. Located just to the north-northeast of it is the crater Levi-Civita while to the southeast is Jules Verne.

== Description ==
The outer rim of Pavlov is somewhat worn and has been damaged in a few locations. There are outward bulges along the southern and eastern rim, and smaller bulges along the western side.

Several small craters lie along the inner walls and the interior floor. Pavlov H is located along the east-southeastern edge of the floor. There is a small crater chain leading to the northwest of this satellite, culminating in a teardrop-shaped crater to the east of the midpoint of Pavlov. There are also small, cup-shaped craters along the southeastern and northwestern edges of the floor. Where it is not marked by tiny craters, the interior floor of Pavlov is relatively flat and level. The infrared spectrum of pure crystalline plagioclase has been identified on the southeast floor.

== Satellite craters ==
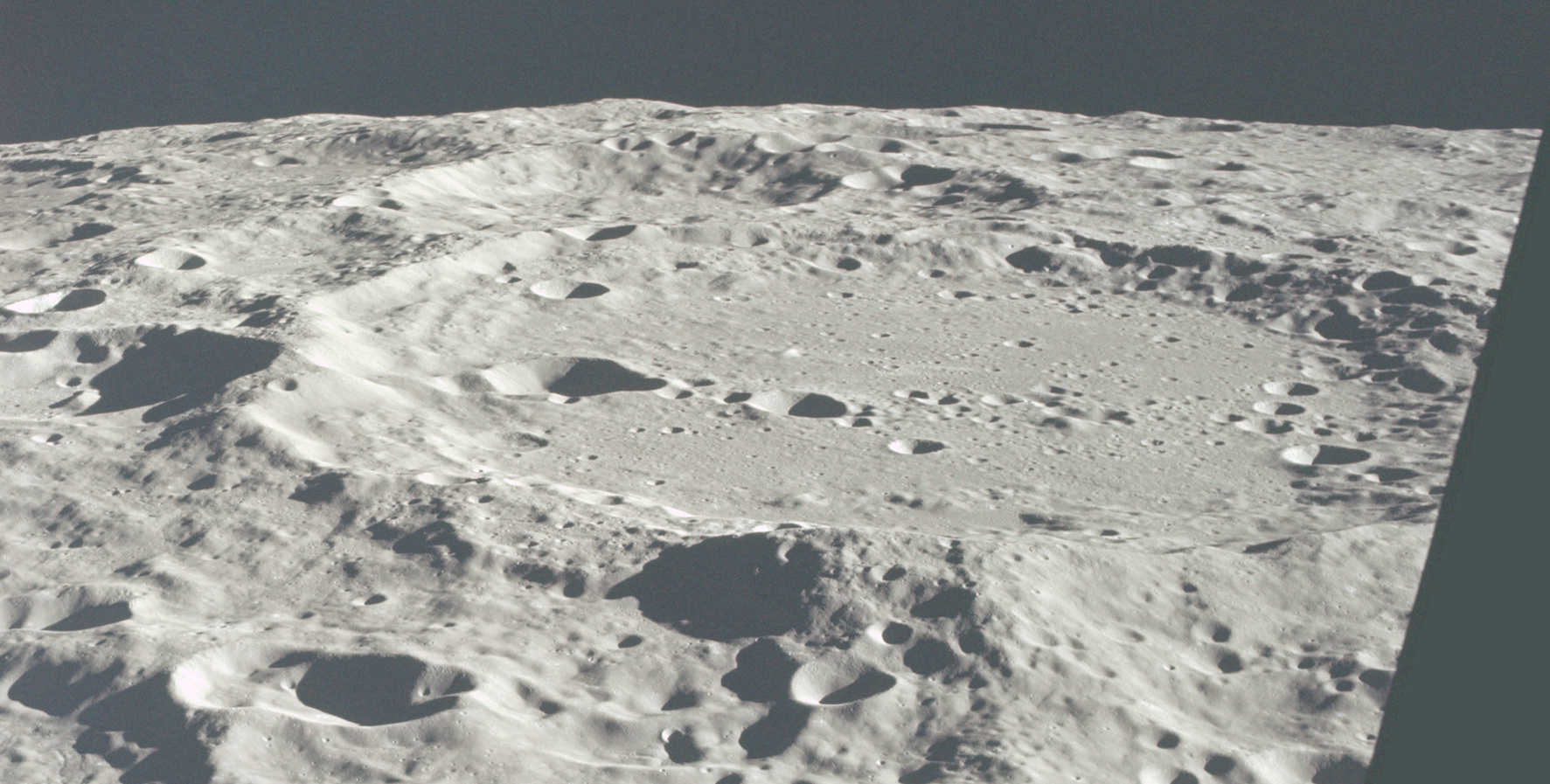
Oblique view of Pavlov crater facing south, from Apollo 17

By convention these features are identified on lunar maps by placing the letter on the side of the crater midpoint that is closest to Pavlov.

Pavlov	Latitude	Longitude	Diameter	Ref
G	29.1° S	145.4° E	43.92 km	WGPSN
H	28.6° S	143.5° E	17.31 km	WGPSN
M	32.3° S	141.8° E	60.64 km	WGPSN
P	33.7° S	139.5° E	50.1 km	WGPSN
T	28.0° S	138.0° E	52.36 km	WGPSN
V	26.7° S	138.0° E	54.82 km	WGPSN

== See also ==
- 1007 Pawlowia, asteroid
