= Isaev (crater) =

Lunar impact crater

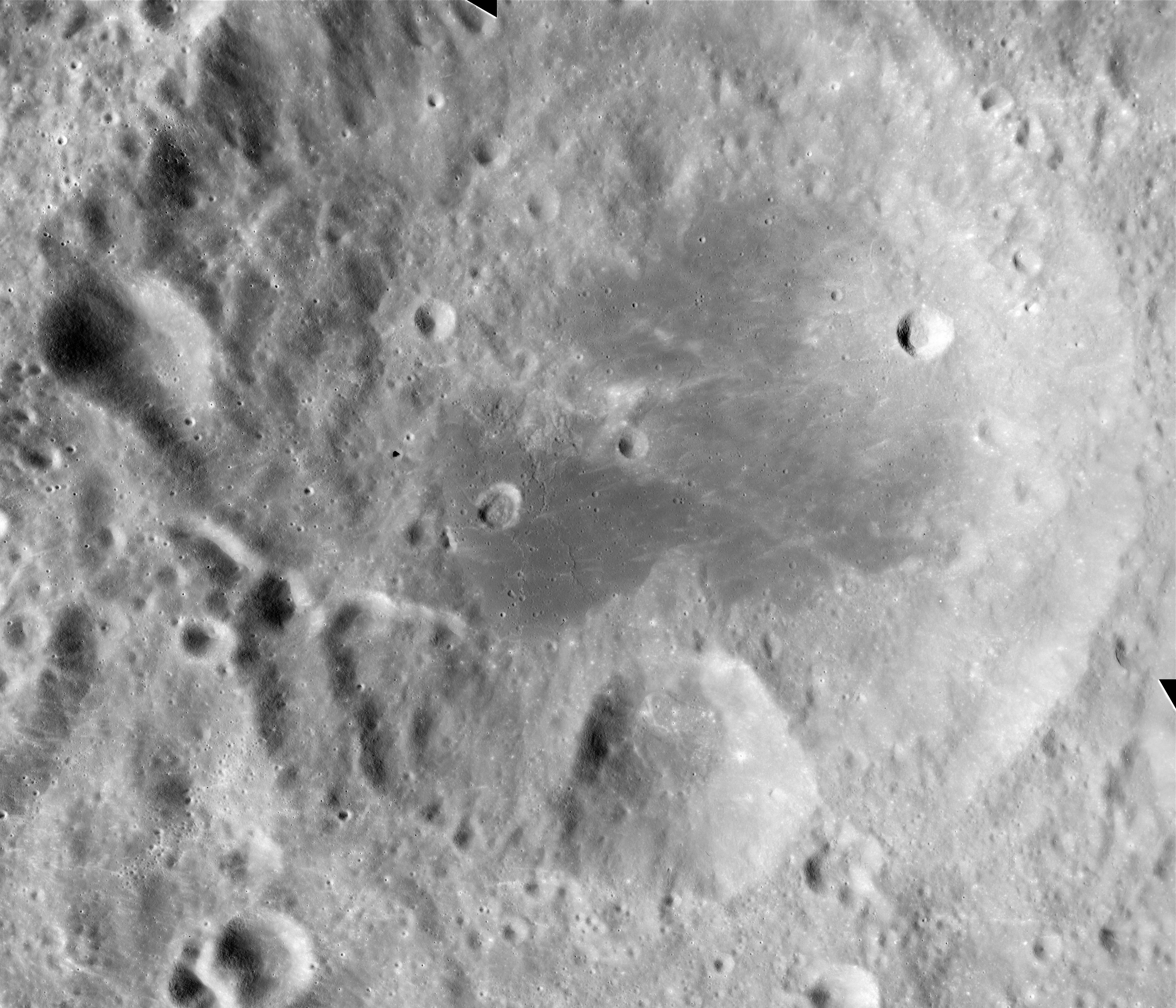
- Apollo 15 Mapping Camera image
- Coordinates: 17.5°S 147.5°E
- Diameter: 90 km
- Depth: Unknown
- Colongitude: 213° at sunrise
- Eponym: Aleksei M. Isaev

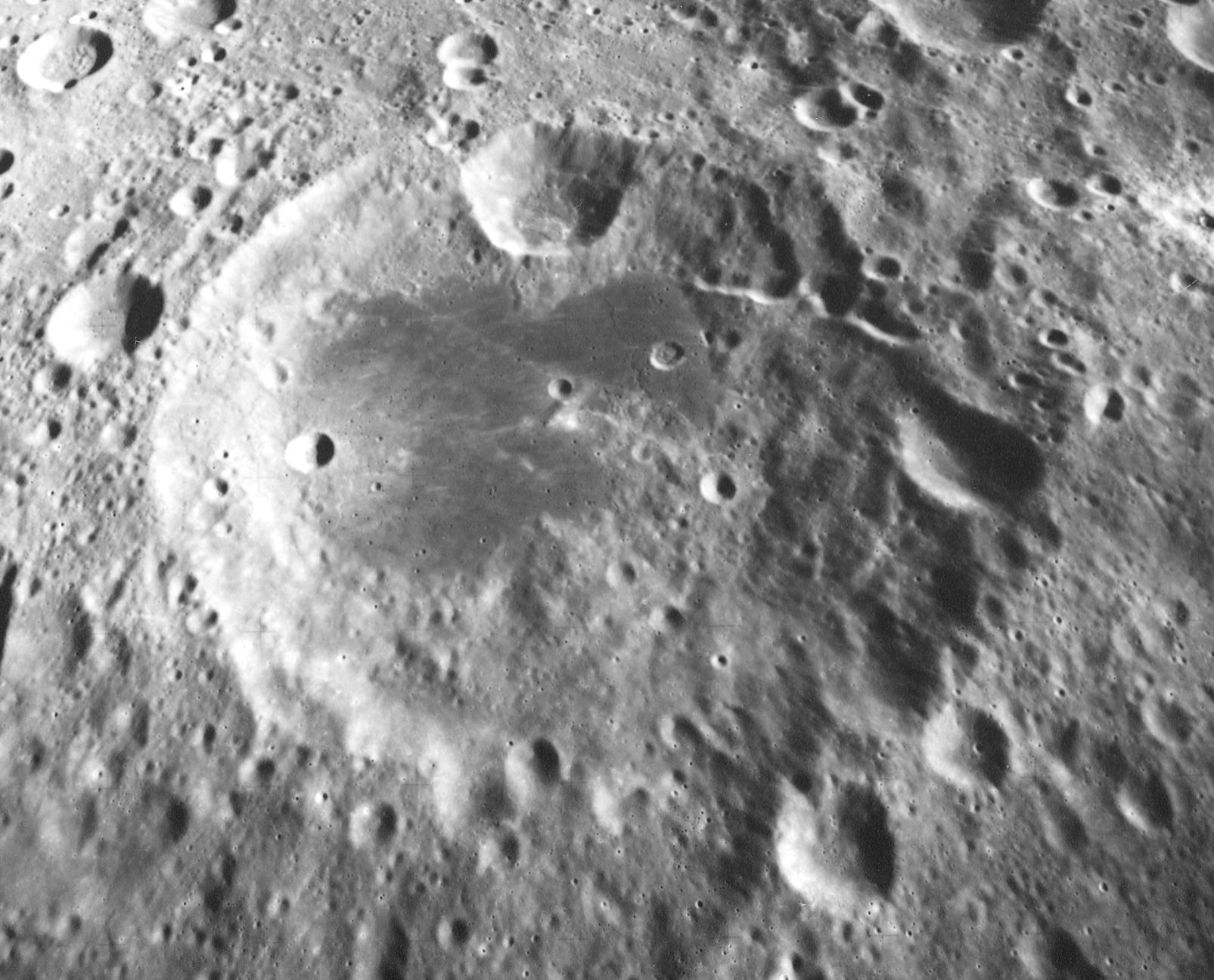
Oblique view facing south from Apollo 17

Isaev is a lunar impact crater on the far side of the Moon. It is entirely contained within the much larger walled plain Gagarin, and lies in the northwestern part of Gagarin's interior floor. The northwestern outer rim of Isaev is attached to the inner rim of Gagarin.

Although younger than Gagarin, in which it lies, this is still an eroded crater formation. The southern rim is broken through by the smaller satellite crater Isaev N. Tiny craterlets lie along the rim and inner walls of Isaev. A short chain of craterlets forms a gouge along the western inner wall. Within the interior floor is a large, triple-lobed area of lower albedo material. Such darker surfaces on the Moon are typically formed by flows of basaltic lava. For the lunar far side, these features are typically 3.7 and 3.8 billion years old.

== Satellite craters ==
By convention these features are identified on lunar maps by placing the letter on the side of the crater midpoint that is closest to Isaev.

Isaev	Latitude	Longitude	Diameter
N	18.7° S	147.3° E	24 km
