= Levi-Civita (crater) =

Crater on the Moon

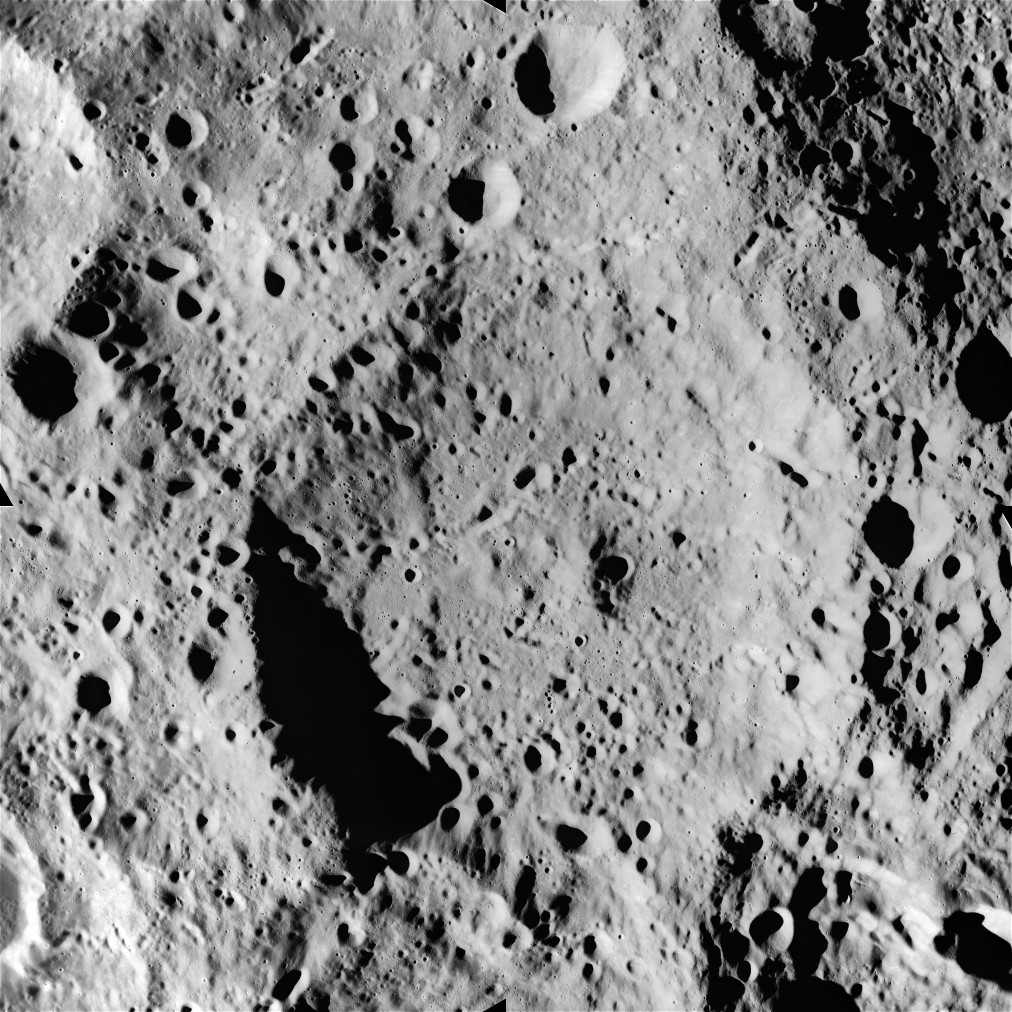
- Levi-Civita from Apollo 15. NASA photo.
- Coordinates: 23.7°S 143.4°E
- Diameter: 102 km
- Colongitude: 218° at sunrise
- Eponym: Tullio Levi-Civita

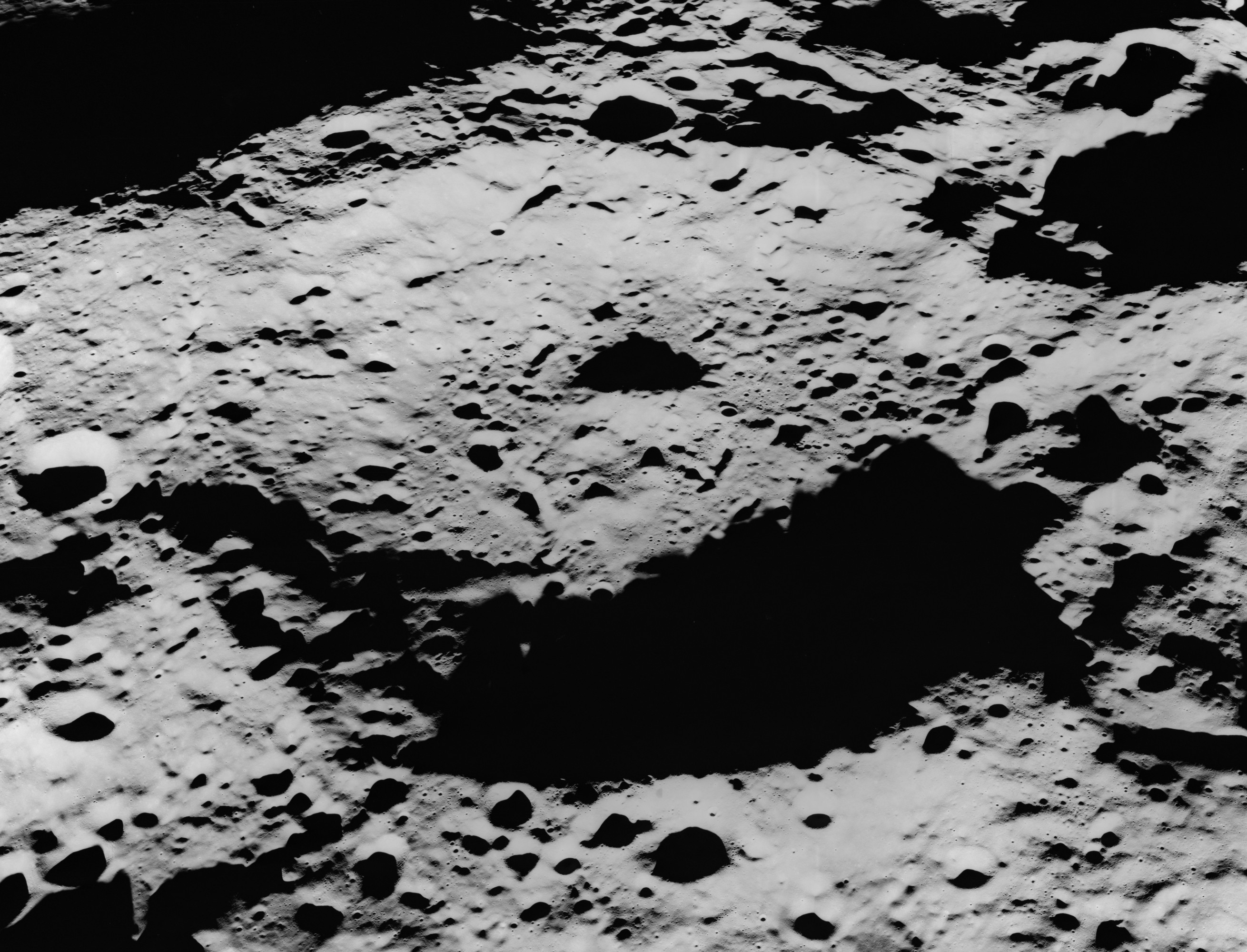
Oblique view facing east from Apollo 15

Levi-Civita is a lunar impact crater formation that lies on the far side of the Moon. It was named after Italian mathematician Tullio Levi-Civita. It is located just to the southwest of the large walled plain named Gagarin, and nearly as close to the crater Pavlov to the south-southwest. To the northwest of Levi-Civita lies the smaller crater Pirquet.

This is an eroded crater formation with smaller impacts along the rim and within the interior. The southern rim closest to Pavlov is the most eroded section, with multiple small craterlets along the edge and near the inner wall. Along the eastern rim is the satellite crater Levi-Civita F. The interior floor, although relatively level, is pitted by a number of small craters. There is a central ridge near the midpoint of the crater.

== Satellite craters ==
By convention these features are identified on lunar maps by placing the letter on the side of the crater midpoint that is closest to Levi-Civita.

Levi-Civita	Latitude	Longitude	Diameter
A	20.5° S	144.0° E	17 km
F	23.4° S	145.4° E	16 km
S	24.1° S	138.8° E	43 km

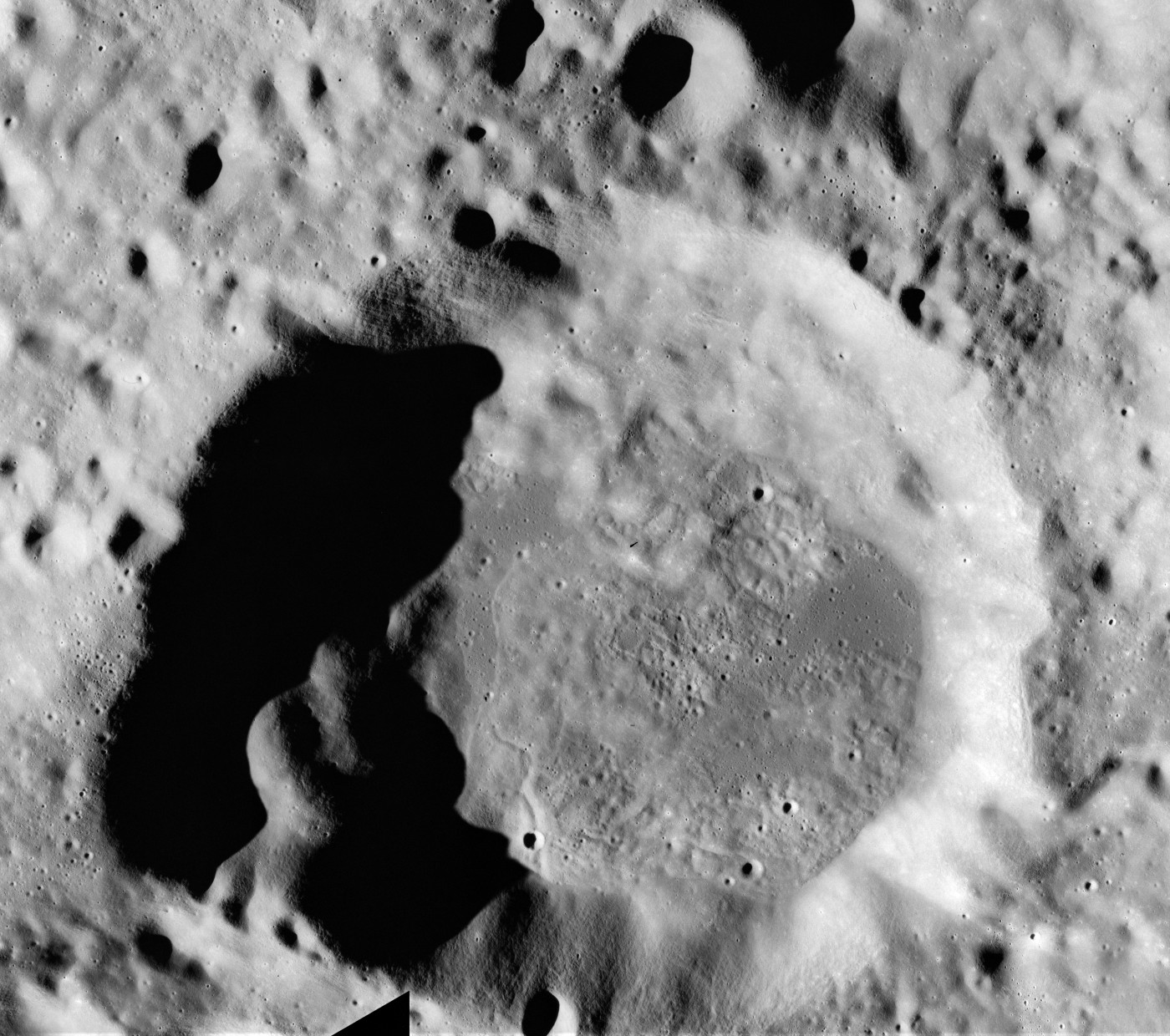
Levi-Civita S has a dark floor and is one of the few far-side craters with mare lava covering it.
