= Raspletin (crater) =

Crater on the Moon

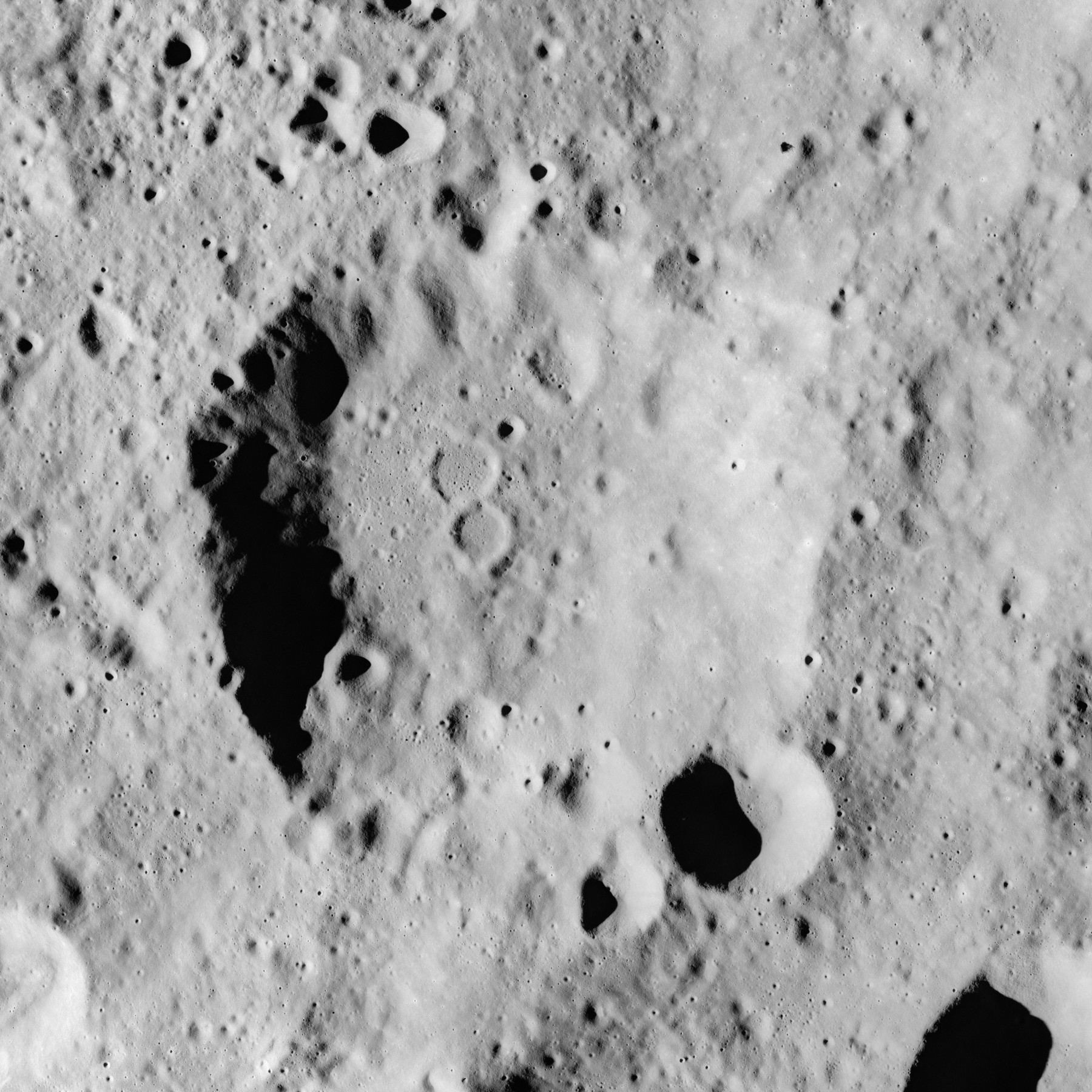
- Apollo 15 image
- Coordinates: 22.5°S 151.8°E
- Diameter: 48 km
- Depth: 2.1 km
- Colongitude: 209° at sunrise
- Eponym: Aleksandr Andreyevich Raspletin

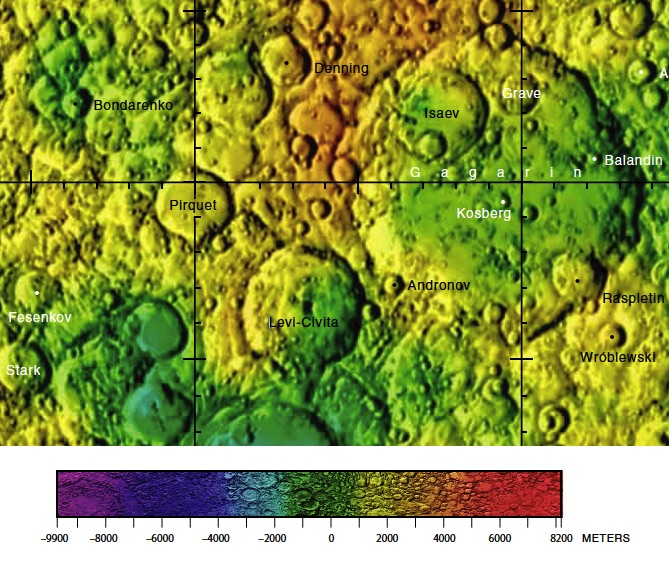
Raspletin on a side lunar chart

Raspletin is a lunar impact crater that is located along the southeastern inner edge of a much larger walled plain named Gagarin, on the far side of the Moon.

The southeastern inner wall of Raspletin has merged with the edge of Gagarin's rim, giving it the appearance of a much wider face along that side. The remainder of the rim is somewhat polygonal in outline, with straight faces to the north and west. The edge is eroded, with some small craters along the southern rim. A small crater is attached to the southern outer rim where Raspletin joins Gagarin's inner face.

The interior floor is irregular in the southeastern half, and more level to the northwest. At the midpoint is a merged pair of small crater rims that appear worn and rounded. There is a small crater along the edge of the inner wall to the northeast and another along the southwest inner side.
