= Ivan Grave =

Ivan Platonovich Grave
- Иван Платонович Граве
- Born: November 25, 1874 [O.S. 13 November] Kazan
- Died: March 3, 1960 (aged 85); Moscow

Ivan Platonovich Grave (Russian: Иван Платонович Граве) (25 November [O.S. 13 November] 1874 in Kazan – March 3, 1960 in Moscow) was a Russian and Soviet scientist in the field of artillery, Doctor of Technical Sciences (1939), professor (1927), member of the Academy of Artillery Sciences (1947-1953), Major General of the Engineer Corps (1942).

Ivan Grave graduated from the Mikhailovskoye Artillery School (1895) and Mikhailovskaya Artillery Academy (1900), where he would begin to teach four year later. In 1916, Grave invented a missile powered by smokeless powder and launched from mobile launchers, and first experiments of primitive liquid-fueled rockets, and therefore he is also known as father of Katyusha. On July 14 of that year he files the patent request No. 746 for a rocket burning smokeless gunpowder, that is issued in 1924. In 1918, he participated in creating the RKKA Artillery Academy, where he would work as a head of studies and head of a department until 1943. Ivan Grave was one of the founders of the Soviet school of internal ballistics. Ivan Grave authored two major works called Internal Ballistics (Внутренняя баллистика) (1933-1938) and Ballistics of Semiclosed Space (Баллистика полузамкнутого пространства) (1940).

In 1938 Ivan Grave was arrested under the false accusation of participating in the "Military-Fascist Plot," but was released in February 1939 after denunciation of "Yezhovshchina" (the reign of the then NKVD chief Yezhov) and during campaign against slander by Joseph Stalin's order as a particularly valuable specialist.

Ivan Grave was awarded the Stalin Prize (1942), Order of Lenin, Orders of the Red Banner, Order of the Patriotic War (1st Class), Order of the Red Star, and numerous medals.

The crater Grave on the Moon is named after him.
