= Justice Graves =

Justice Graves may refer to:

- Benjamin F. Graves (judge) (1817–1906), associate justice of the Michigan Supreme Court
- Charles Burleigh Graves (1841–1912), associate justice of the Kansas Supreme Court
- James E. Graves Jr. (born 1953), associate justice of the Mississippi Supreme Court
- Thomas Graves (judge) (1684–1747), associate justice of the Massachusetts Supreme Judicial Court
- Waller Washington Graves (1860–1928), associate justice of the Supreme Court of Missouri
- William Graves (judge) (born 1935), associate justice of the Kentucky Supreme Court
