= Beijerinck (crater) =

Lunar impact crater

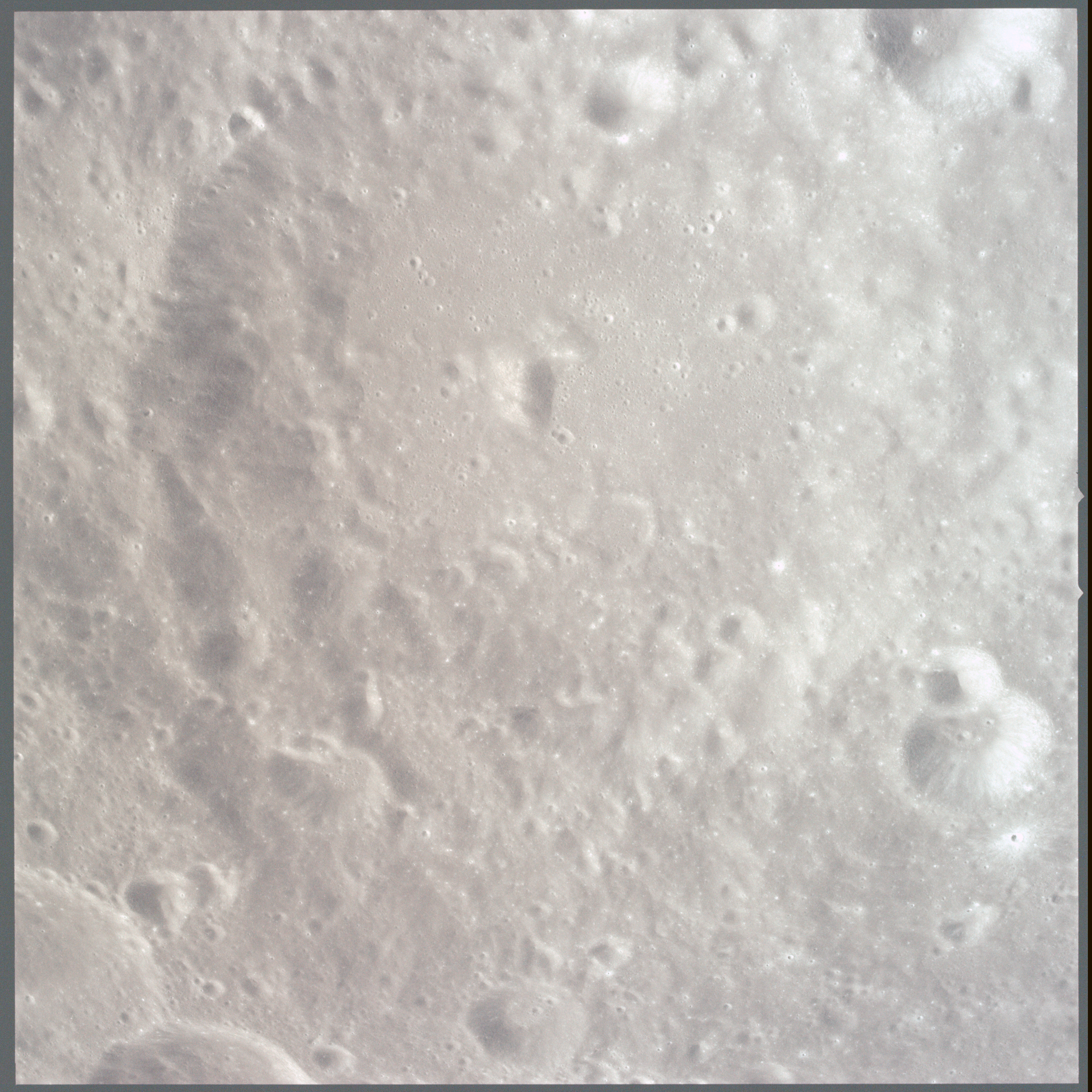
- Beijerinck from Apollo 17. NASA photo.
- Coordinates: 13.40°S 151.84°E
- Diameter: 76.77 km (47.70 mi)
- Depth: Unknown
- Colongitude: 209° at sunrise
- Eponym: Martinus W. Beijerinck

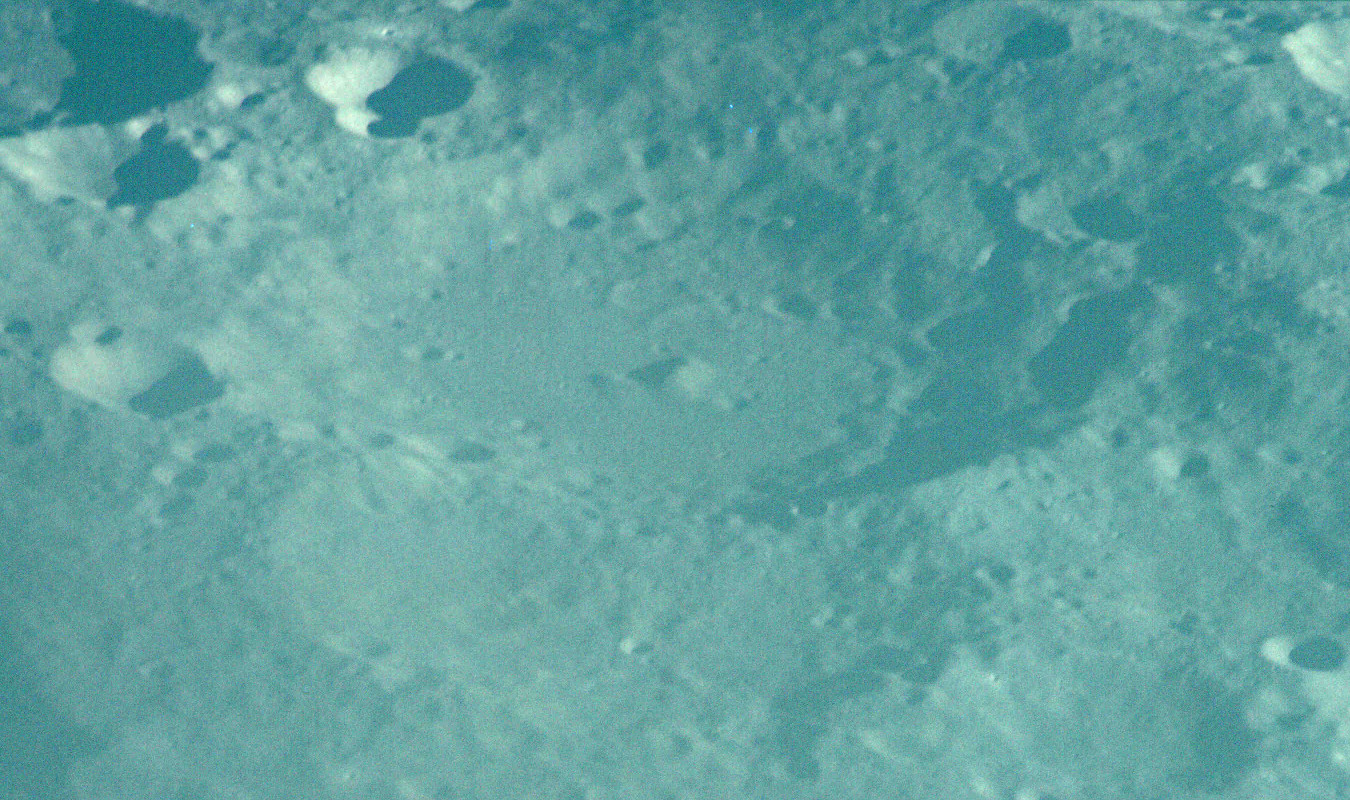
Oblique view from Apollo 13

Beijerinck is a lunar impact crater on the far side of the Moon. It lies to the south of the larger crater Chaplygin, and to the northeast of the huge walled plain Gagarin.

The outer rim of this crater is heavily worn and eroded by subsequent meteor bombardment, particularly along the southern half, with several small and tiny craterlets lying along the rim. The interior floor, in contrast, is relatively level and unmarked by notable impacts. There is a small, angled central peak near the midpoint of the floor.

The crater was named after Dutch botanist Martinus W. Beijerinck (1851–1931). Its designation was formally adopted by the International Astronomical Union in 1970. Beijerinck was identified as Crater 298 prior to naming.

== Satellite craters ==
By convention these features are identified on lunar maps by placing the letter on the side of the crater midpoint that is closest to Beijerinck.

Beijerinck	Latitude	Longitude	Diameter
C	11.0° S	153.7° E	20 km
D	12.8° S	153.1° E	14 km
H	14.2° S	153.3° E	16 km
J	14.8° S	153.7° E	40 km
R	14.7° S	149.2° E	28 km
S	14.2° S	147.2° E	27 km
U	12.4° S	149.0° E	18 km
V	12.7° S	150.1° E	42 km
