= Graves, Georgia =

Unincorporated community in Georgia, U.S.

Graves Graves Station
- Unincorporated community
- Location in Georgia Graves (the United States)
- Coordinates: 31°46′06″N 84°31′09″W
- Country: United States
- State: Georgia
- County: Terrell
- Post office established: 1888 (as Graves Station)
- Named for: Iverson Graves
- Time zone: UTC−5 (Eastern (EST))
  - Summer (DST): UTC−4 (EDT)

Graves is an unincorporated community in Terrell County, Georgia, United States.

A variant name for the community was "Graves Station". A post office called Graves Station was established in 1888, the name was changed to Graves in 1927, and the post office closed in 1980. The community has the name of one Iverson Graves.
