= Gagarin (crater) =

Crater on the Moon

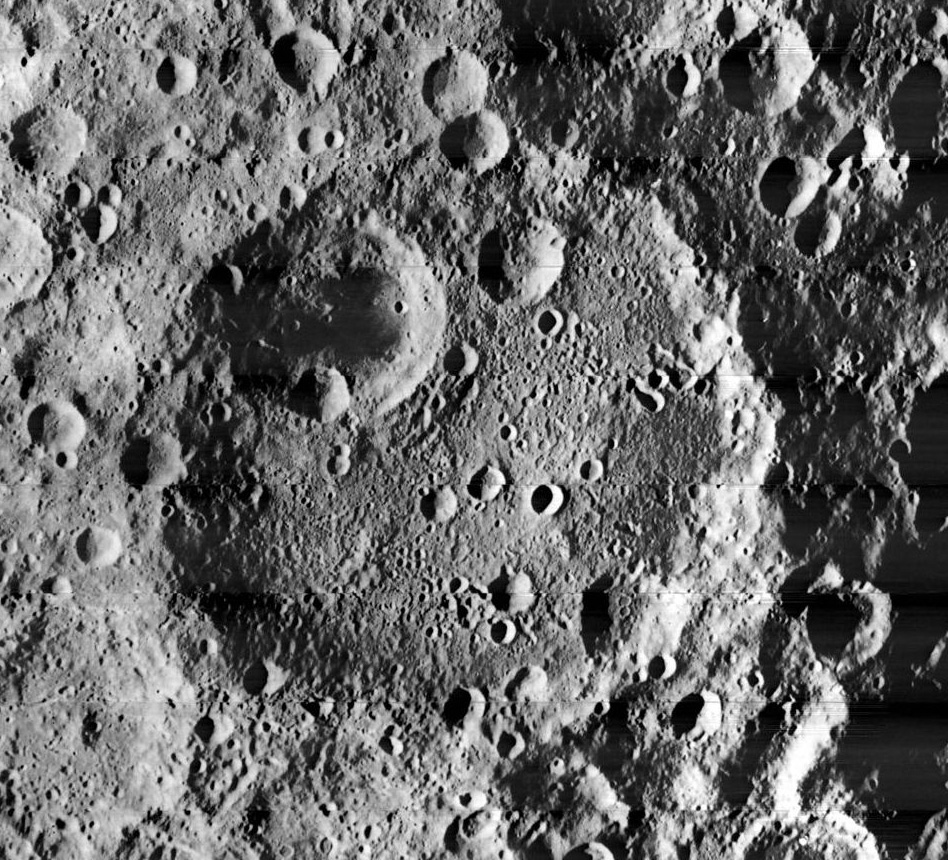
- Lunar crater Gagarin seen by Lunar Orbiter 1 in 1966
- Coordinates: 19.66°S 149.35°E
- Diameter: 261.83 km (162.69 mi)
- Depth: 4.8 km (3.0 mi)
- Colongitude: 215° at sunrise
- Formation: Pre-Nectarian
- Eponym: Yuri Gagarin

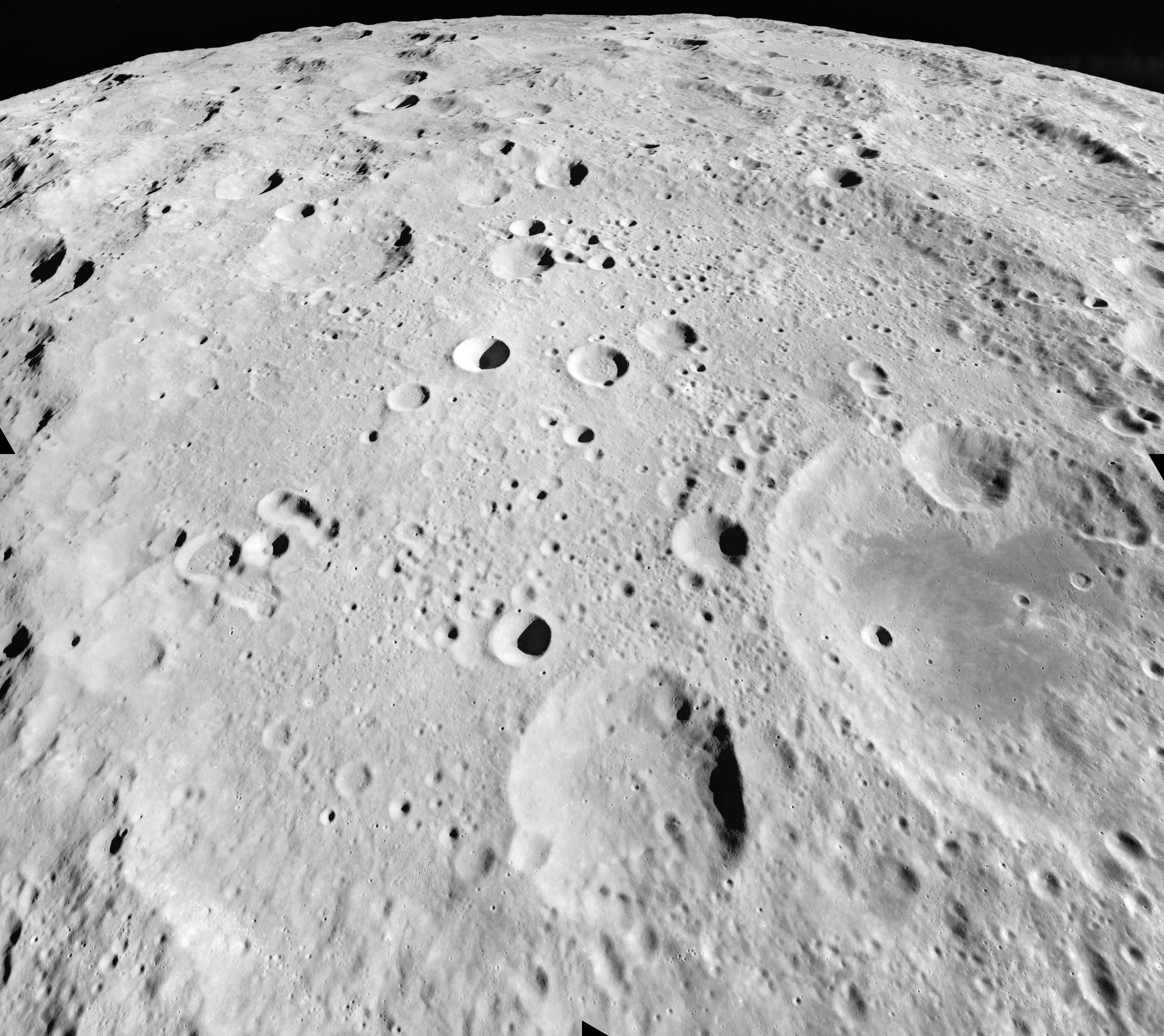
Oblique view facing south from Apollo 17.

Gagarin is a large lunar impact crater that is located in the southern hemisphere on the far side of the Moon. To the southwest is the crater Pavlov and to the northeast lies Keeler. Closer to the rim are the craters Levi-Civita to the southwest, and Beijerinck to the north-northeast. Isaev lies entirely within the northwest rim of Gagarin. In contrast with the floor of Gagarin, Isaev has a floor with a somewhat low albedo.

Gagarin dates to the Pre-Nectarian period of the lunar geologic timescale. It has been heavily eroded by a long history of crater impacts. The worn rim forms a low, circular ridge around the somewhat bowl-shaped interior. The inner floor is covered by a multitude of crater impacts of various dimensions. Little if anything remains of a central ridge or peak ring, if the crater ever possessed such a feature.

The crater is named after Yuri Gagarin, the Soviet cosmonaut who was the first human in space and the first to orbit the Earth. This designation was formally adopted by the International Astronomical Union in 1970. Prior to naming, Gagarin was called Basin X. Six craters falling within the perimeter of Gagarin have been named after pioneers of Russian aviation and astronautics, including Isaev, Grave, Balandin, Raspletin, Kosberg, and Andronov.

== Satellite craters ==
By convention these features are identified on lunar maps by placing the letter on the side of the crater midpoint that is closest to Gagarin.

| Gagarin | Coordinates | Diameter |
|---|---|---|
| G | 20.51°S 150.54°E | 14 km |
| M | 23.51°S 149.17°E | 18 km |
| T | 19.33°S 144.75°E | 26 km |
| Z | 15.31°S 149.60°E | 27 km |

== See also ==
- 1772 Gagarin, asteroid
