= List of rural localities in Chelyabinsk Oblast =

Map of Russia with Chelyabinsk Oblast highlighted

This is a list of rural localities in Chelyabinsk Oblast. Chelyabinsk Oblast (Russian: Челя́бинская о́бласть, Chelyabinskaya oblast) is a federal subject (an oblast) of Russia in the Ural Mountains region, on the border of Europe and Asia. Its administrative center is the city of Chelyabinsk. Population: 3,476,217 (2010 Census).

== Locations ==
- Abdrakhmanova
- Abdulka
- Abdyrova
- Ablyazovo
- Agapovka
- Argayash
- Berlin
- Bredy
- Chesma
- Dolgoderevenskoye
- Fershampenuaz
- Izmaylovsky
- Kasselsky
- Kizilskoye
- Krasnokamenka
- Kunashak
- Leyptsig
- Miasskoye
- Oktyabrskoye
- Ostrolensky
- Parizh
- Polotskoye
- Uvelsky
- Uyskoye
- Varshavka
- Yeleninka
- Yetkul

== See also ==
- Lists of rural localities in Russia
