= List of populated places named after populated places =

This is a list of populated places named after other populated places.

== Africa ==
=== Namibia ===
- Gross Barmen – Barmen

=== South Africa ===
- Aberdeen – Aberdeen
- Alkmaar, Mpumalanga – Alkmaar
- Amersfoort, Mpumalanga – Amersfoort
- Belfast, Mpumalanga – Belfast
- Berlin – Berlin
- Donnybrook, KwaZulu-Natal – Donnybrook, Dublin
- Dundee, KwaZulu-Natal – Dundee
- Ermelo – Ermelo, Netherlands
- Germiston – Germiston, Glasgow
- Grabouw – Grabow
- Hamburg – Hamburg
- Hanover – Hanover
- Heidelberg, Western Cape – Heidelberg
- Heidelberg, Gauteng – Heidelberg
- Hermannsburg, KwaZulu-Natal – Hermannsburg
- Llandudno, Western Cape – Llandudno
- Lüneburg, KwaZulu-Natal – Lüneburg
- Margate – Margate
- Marseilles, Free State – Marseille
- New Hanover, KwaZulu-Natal – Hanover
- Utrecht – Utrecht

== Americas ==
=== Argentina ===
- Córdoba – Córdoba, Spain

=== Brazil ===
- Nova Friburgo – Fribourg
- Novo Hamburgo – Hamburg

=== Canada ===
- Airdrie, Alberta – Airdrie, North Lanarkshire
- Aldborough Township, Ontario – Aldborough (Aldeburgh)
- Alnwick/Haldimand – Alnwick
- Athens, Ontario – Athens
- Bardo, Alberta – Bardu
- Béthanie, Quebec – Bethany
- Brampton – Brampton, Carlisle
- Calgary – Calgary, Mull
- Calmar, Alberta – Kalmar
- Camrose, Alberta – Camrose, Pembrokeshire
- Cardiff, Alberta – Cardiff
- Connemara, Alberta – Connemara
- Dinant, Alberta – Dinant
- Dresden, Ontario – Dresden
- Duagh, Alberta – Duagh
- Edmonton – Edmonton, London
- Falun, Alberta – Falun
- Greater Sudbury – Sudbury, Suffolk
- Harlech, Alberta – Harlech
- Hebron, Prince Edward Island – Hebron
- Kimberley, British Columbia – Kimberley, Northern Cape
- Krakow, Alberta – Kraków
- Lisburn, Alberta – Lisburn
- London, Ontario – London
- Morningside, Alberta – Morningside, Edinburgh
- Mosside, Alberta – Moss-side, County Antrim
- New Westminster – Westminster
- Odessa, Ontario – Odesa
- Palermo, Ontario – Palermo
- Roros, Alberta – Røros
- Scarborough, Ontario – Scarborough, North Yorkshire
- Sebastopol Township, Ontario – Sevastopol
- Sniatyn, Alberta – Sniatyn
- Stratford, Ontario – Stratford-upon-Avon
- Stry, Alberta – Stryi
- Stubno, Alberta – Stubno
- Surrey, British Columbia – Surrey
- Venice, Alberta – Venice
- Vilna, Alberta – Vilnius
- Warwick, Ontario – Warwick
- Waterloo, Ontario – Waterloo, Belgium
- Wilno, Ontario – Wilno (Vilnius)
- Windsor, Ontario – Windsor, Berkshire
- Wrentham, Alberta – Wrentham, Suffolk
- Woodstock, Ontario – Woodstock, Oxfordshire
- Yeoford, Alberta – Yeoford

=== Colombia ===
- Pamplona, Norte de Santander – Pamplona

=== El Salvador ===
- Berlín, Usulután – Berlin

=== Guatemala ===
- Zaragoza, Chimaltenango – Zaragoza

=== Mexico ===
- Valladolid, Yucatán – Valladolid
- Zaragoza, Puebla – Zaragoza

=== Nicaragua ===
- Granada – Granada

=== United States ===
- Memphis, Tennessee – Memphis, Egypt
- Richmond, Virginia – Richmond, London

=== Venezuela ===
- Valencia – Valencia de Don Juan

== Asia ==
=== Russia ===
- Belostok, Tomsk Oblast – Białystok
- Berlin – Berlin
- Bredy – Breda
- Fershampenuaz – Fère-Champenoise
- Izmaylovsky – Izmail
- Kasselsky – Kassel
- Leyptsig – Leipzig
- Ostrolensky – Ostrołęka
- Parizh, Chelyabinsk Oblast – Paris
- Polotskoye, Chelyabinsk Oblast – Polotsk
- Varna – Varna, Bulgaria
- Varshavka, Chelyabinsk Oblast – Warsaw

== Australia ==
=== Australia ===
- Almaden, Queensland – Almadén
- Alsace, Queensland – Alsace
- Beverly Hills, New South Wales – Beverly Hills, California
- Cracow, Queensland – Kraków
- Hampton, Queensland – Hampton, London
- Hermannsburg, Northern Territory – Hermannsburg
- Ilfracombe, Queensland – Ilfracombe
- Kilcoy, Queensland – Kilcoy, Scotland

=== New Zealand ===
- Albany – Albany, Western Australia
- Brighton – Brighton
- Dunedin – Dùn Èideann (Edinburgh)
- Fairlie – Fairlie, North Ayrshire
- Kirwee – Karwi
- New Brighton – New Brighton, Merseyside
- New Plymouth – Plymouth

== Europe ==
=== Belgium ===
- Belgrade, Namur – Belgrade

=== Poland ===
- Kalisz Pomorski – Kalisz
- Łańcut – Landshut
- Modliborzyce, Lublin Voivodeship – Modliborzyce, Świętokrzyskie Voivodeship
- Ostróda – Osterode am Harz
- Parma – Parma, Italy
- Szczecinek – Szczecin

=== Russia ===
- Armavir – Armavir, Armenia
- Novocherkassk – Cherkassk

=== Slovakia ===
- Praha – Prague

=== Ukraine ===
- Bar – Bari
- Kherson – Chersonesus
- Odesa – Odessos

== See also ==
- List of biblical place names in North America

== Bibliography ==
- Place-names of Alberta. Ottawa: Geographic Board of Canada. 1928.
- Armstrong, George Henry (1930). The origin and meaning of place names in Canada. Toronto: The Macmillan Company of Canada Limited.
