= Nagaibak dialect =

Tatar dialect spoken in Russia

Nagaibak
- Native to: Russia
- Region: Chelyabinsk Oblast
- Ethnicity: Nagaibak
- Native speakers: 110,000 (2013)
- Language family: Turkic: Common Turkic; Kipchak; Kipchak-Bulgar; Tatar; Central; Nagaibak

Language codes
- ISO 639-3: –
- Glottolog: None

The Nagaibak dialect is a Tatar dialect spoken by the Nagaibak, a Turkic ethnic subgroup living in Russia. It is a middle dialect of the Tatar language, and is similar to the dialect of the Kryashens. Many speakers live in Fershampenuaz.
