= Nagaybaksky =

Nagaybaksky (masculine), Nagaybakskaya (feminine), or Nagaybakskoye (neuter) may refer to:

- Nagaybaksky District, a district of Chelyabinsk Oblast, Russia
- Nagaybaksky (rural locality), a rural locality (a settlement) in Chelyabinsk Oblast, Russia
