= Leyptsig =

Village in Chelyabinsk Oblast, Russia

Leyptsig Лейпциг
- Rural locality
- Interactive map of Leyptsig
- Location of Leyptsig Leyptsig (Russia)
- Coordinates: 53°34′0″N 61°2′45″E
- Country: Russia
- Federal subject: Chelyabinsk Oblast
- Founded: 1842–1843
- Elevation: 240 m (790 ft)

Population
  - Estimate (2021): 638 )
- Time zone: UTC+5 (MSK+2)
- Postal code: 457214
- OKTMO ID: 75614435101

Leyptsig (Russian: Лейпциг) is a rural locality (a village) in Varnensky District, Chelyabinsk Oblast, in the Asian part of Russia, close to the border with Kazakhstan. It has a population of 717 (2010 census);

== History ==
The settlement was founded in 1842–1843, and named after the city of Leipzig, to commemorate the 1813 Battle of Leipzig.

It is one of several villages in the Chelyabinsk Oblast named after major European cities, other including Varshavka (named after Warsaw), Parizh (named after Paris), Berlin (named after Berlin), Varna (named after Varna) and Bredy (named after Breda).

== Demographics ==
Distribution of the population by ethnicity according to the 2021 census:

	percent
Russians	77.90%
Kazakhs	16.14%
Tatars	2.51%
Ukrainians	1.25%
Germans	0.63%
Chuvash	0.63%
Udmurts	0.47%
