= Varshavka, Chelyabinsk Oblast =

Village in Chelyabinsk Oblast, Russia

Varshavka Варшавка
- Rural locality
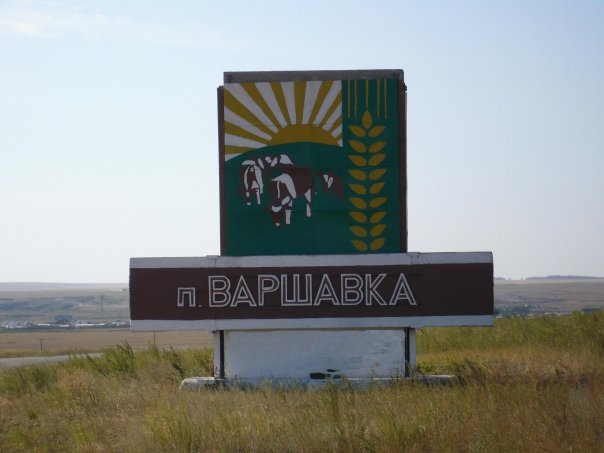
- Interactive map of Varshavka
- Location of Varshavka Varshavka (Russia)
- Coordinates: 52°50′43″N 60°20′14″E
- Country: Russia
- Federal subject: Chelyabinsk Oblast
- Founded: 1842

Population
  - Estimate (2021): 853 )
- Time zone: UTC+5 (MSK+2)
- Postal code: 457372
- OKTMO ID: 75623410101

Varshavka (Russian: Варшавка) is a rural locality (a village) in Kartalinsky District, Chelyabinsk Oblast, in the Asian part of Russia. It has a population of 1,059 (2010 census); and is situated on the Karagayly-Ayat River.

== History ==
The settlement was founded in 1842, and named after the Polish city of Warsaw, to commemorate the successful storming by the Tsarist troops on 6 September 1831 during the Polish November Uprising.

It is one of several villages in the Chelyabinsk Oblast named after major European cities, other including Parizh (named after Paris, France), Berlin (named after Berlin, Germany), Leyptsig (named after Leipzig, Germany), Varna (named after Varna, Bulgaria) and Bredy (named after Breda, Netherlands).

== Demographics ==
Distribution of the population by ethnicity according to the 2021 census:

	percent
Russians	59.09%
Kazakhs	11.84%
Tatars	1.41%
Ukrainians	1.06%
Bashkirs	0.70%
Moldovans	0.59%
Armenians	0.47%
Germans	0.39%
Refused answer, no nationality or no information	24.03%
