= Serving Tatars =

Tatar people serving as state servants

Serving Tatars (Tatar: йомышлы татарлар; Russian: Служилые татары) were a class of ethnically Tatars state servants in Russia (particularly Muscovy) and Polish–Lithuanian Commonwealth in the 14th–18th centuries.

== History ==
Originally this class was formed Tatar nobles from Golden Horde and Tatar khanates that enjoyed membership of the Russian service class. Later, qara xalıq (black people) peasants of Kazan Khanate enjoyed this status after the fall of khanate in 1552. Their own ownership of shares in state land were granted to Russian and Qasim nobles.

The elite of the Serving Tatars were those served as translators, scribes, clerks, ambassadors to Central Asian countries and so on. The majority participated in Livonian war of 1558–1583, as well as other campaigns. They also, with the Cossacks, protected the Eastern borders of Russia, especially in the modern Orenburg Oblast. Unlike most Tatars, they had the right to use firearms and some of them became officers in the Russian Army.

Serving Tatars received land, taxation privileges, financial support and food. They also had privileges in handicraft production and trade. In the 18th century they were reclassified as members of the class of State Peasants.

After Vasily II the numbers of Tatars entering the nobility of Muscovy rose dramatically. According to a 17th-century compilation by Zagoskin, 156 noble families were of Tatar or similar origin, while 168 were of the Viking-origin House of Rurik and 42 of unspecified Russian origin. There were also 452 families from Western Europe and Poland-Lithuania, but most of these only settled in Russia during the 17th century. Russian and Tatar nobles intermarried. A modern estimate suggests that one-third of all Russian nobles were of Turkic origins.

== See also ==
- Kryashens and Nağaybäk, Christian Tatars in modern Russia.
- Lipka Tatars in Grand Duchy of Lithuania
- Tatars Nobility (ru:Татарская аристократия)

== Sources ==
- "Йомышлы татарлар". Tatar Encyclopaedia (in Tatar). Kazan: The Republic of Tatarstan Academy of Sciences. Institution of the Tatar Encyclopaedia. 2002.
