= Leonid Smetannikov =

Soviet and Russian baritone opera singer (born 1943)

- Леонид Сметанников
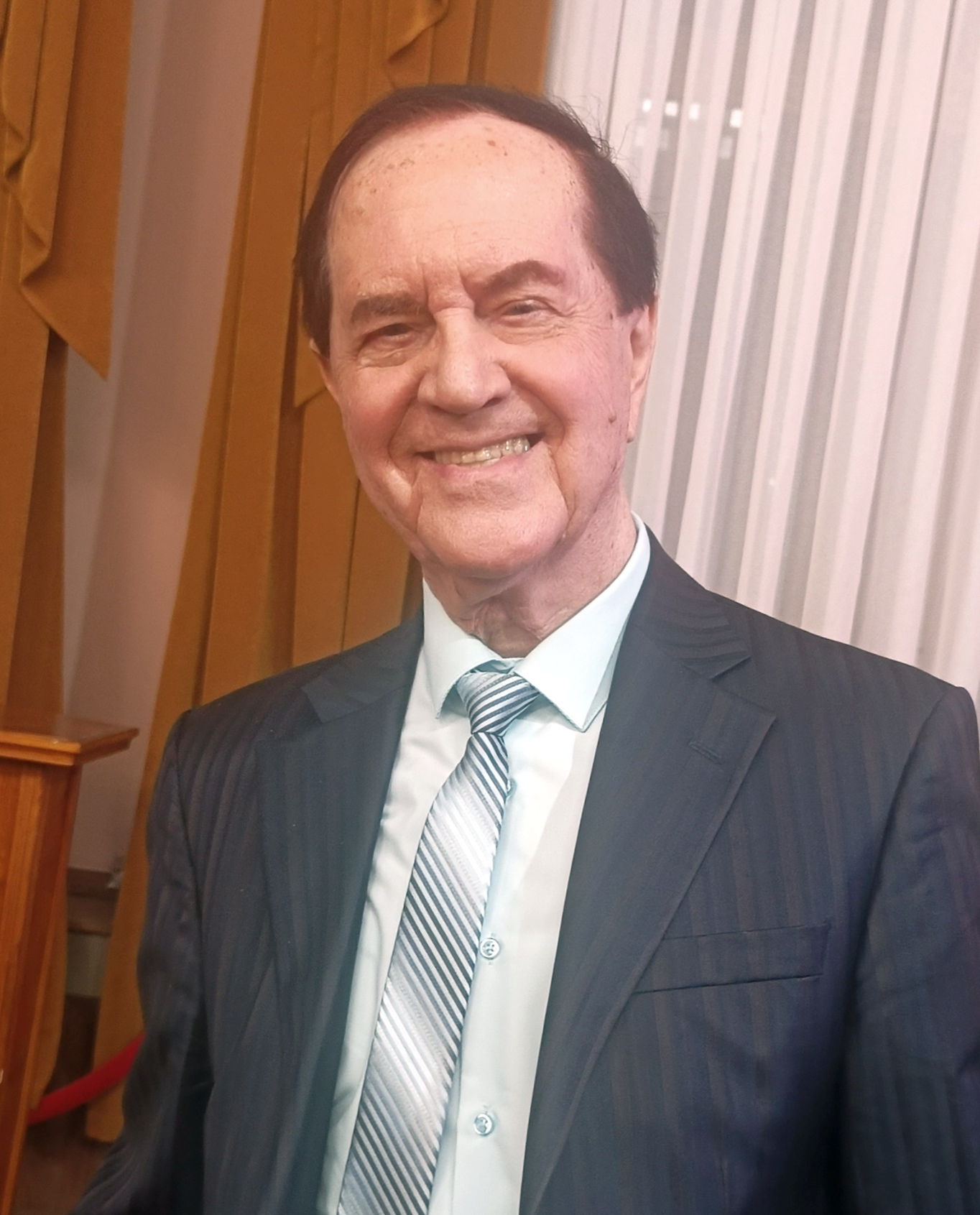
- Smetannikov in 2026
- Born: Leonid Anatolyevich Smetannikov; 12 August 1943 (age 83); Fershampenuaz, Chelyabinsk Oblast, Russian SFSR, Soviet Union
- Education: Saratov Conservatory
- Occupations: Opera singer (baritone), music educator
- Years active: 1968–present
- Title: People's Artist of the USSR (1987)
- Website: smetannikov.info

Leonid Anatolyevich Smetannikov (Russian: Леонид Анатольевич Сметанников; born 12 August 1943) is a Soviet and Russian baritone opera singer and music pedagogue. He has been a long-standing leading soloist of the Saratov Opera and Ballet Theater.

== Biography ==
Leonid Smetannikov was born on 12 August 1943 in the village of Fershampenuaz, Chelyabinsk Oblast, during the wartime evacuation of his family in the course of World War II. After the war, his family relocated to Dniprodzerzhynsk in the Ukrainian SSR. He graduated from a technical college in 1961 and worked as an electrical technician at the Dnipro Metallurgical Plant. Having sung from an early age, he later joined the plant’s amateur choir and subsequently decided to pursue professional vocal training.

In 1962, Smetannikov enrolled at the Dnipro Academy of Music. He later continued his studies at the Saratov Conservatory under Alexander Bystrov and graduated in 1971.

Smetannikov joined the Saratov Opera and Ballet Theater in 1968, where he made his stage debut as Prince Yeletsky in Tchaikovsky’s The Queen of Spades. Over the course of his career, he has appeared in more than 900 stage performances and given several hundred concert appearances in the Soviet Union and abroad. His repertoire comprises more than 300 operatic arias, romances, and songs by Russian, Soviet, and international composers. Smetannikov has also performed internationally, including a concert and master class in the United States in 2013.

In 1973, he received prizes at several major vocal competitions, including the All-Union Contest of Soviet Song Performers in Minsk, the World Festival of Youth and Students in Berlin, and the Mikhail Glinka Vocal Competition in Chișinău.

In 1975, Smetannikov was among the early performers of David Tukhmanov and Vladimir Kharitonov’s song Victory Day on the television program Little Blue Light, alongside Lev Leshchenko.

Since 1977, Smetannikov has taught at the Saratov Conservatory, where he was appointed professor in 1989. From 1991 to 2008, he served as a member of the Council for Vocal Art under the Russian Ministry of Culture. In 2024, he was awarded the National Opera Award Onegin in the “Legend” category.

== Personal life ==
Smetannikov has been married twice. His second wife, Zinaida Ivanovna, is an opera singer and serves as the manager of his concert tours. He resides in Saratov and practices Orthodox Christianity.

== Selected opera roles ==
- Prince Yeletsky in The Queen of Spades by Pyotr Tchaikovsky
- Figaro in The Barber of Seville by Gioachino Rossini
- Eugene Onegin in Eugene Onegin by Pyotr Tchaikovsky
- Escamillo in Carmen by Georges Bizet
- Germont in La traviata by Giuseppe Verdi
- Robert in Iolanta by Pyotr Tchaikovsky
- Don Giovanni in Don Giovanni by Wolfgang Amadeus Mozart
- Demon in The Demon by Anton Rubinstein

== Honours and awards ==
Orders

- Order "For Merit in Culture and Art" (2025)
- Order of Friendship (2000)
- Order of the Badge of Honour (1980)
- Order of St. Seraphim of Sarov (Russian Orthodox Church, 2005)

Titles and prizes

- People's Artist of the USSR (1987)
- People's Artist of the RSFSR (1979)
- Honored Artist of the RSFSR (1976)
- Glinka State Prize of the RSFSR (1982)
- Laureate of the National Opera Award Onegin, “Legend” category (2024)
- Honorary Citizen of Saratov (1999)
