= Kasselsky =

Village in Chelyabinsk Oblast, Russia

Kasselsky Кассельский
- Rural locality
- Interactive map of Kasselsky
- Location of Kasselsky Kasselsky (Russia)
- Coordinates: 53°48′12″N 59°34′16″E
- Country: Russia
- Federal subject: Chelyabinsk Oblast
- Founded: 1842

Population
  - Estimate (2021): 801 )
- Time zone: UTC+5 (MSK+2)
- Postal code: 457665
- OKTMO ID: 75642430101

Kasselsky (Russian: Кассельский) is a rural locality (a village) in Nagaybaksky District, Chelyabinsk Oblast, in the Asian part of Russia. It has a population of 998 (2010 census);

== History ==
The settlement was founded in 1842, and named after the city of Kassel, to commemorate the 1813 Battle of Kassel.

== Demographics ==
Distribution of the population by ethnicity according to the 2021 census:

| | percent |
| Nağaybäk | 73.03% |
| Russians | 16.85% |
| Kazakhs | 4.12% |
| Tatars | 2.00% |
| Bashkirs | 1.25% |
| Poles | 0.37% |
| Refused answer or no information | 1.12% |
