= Bredinsky District =

Bredinsky District Брединский район (Russian)
- District
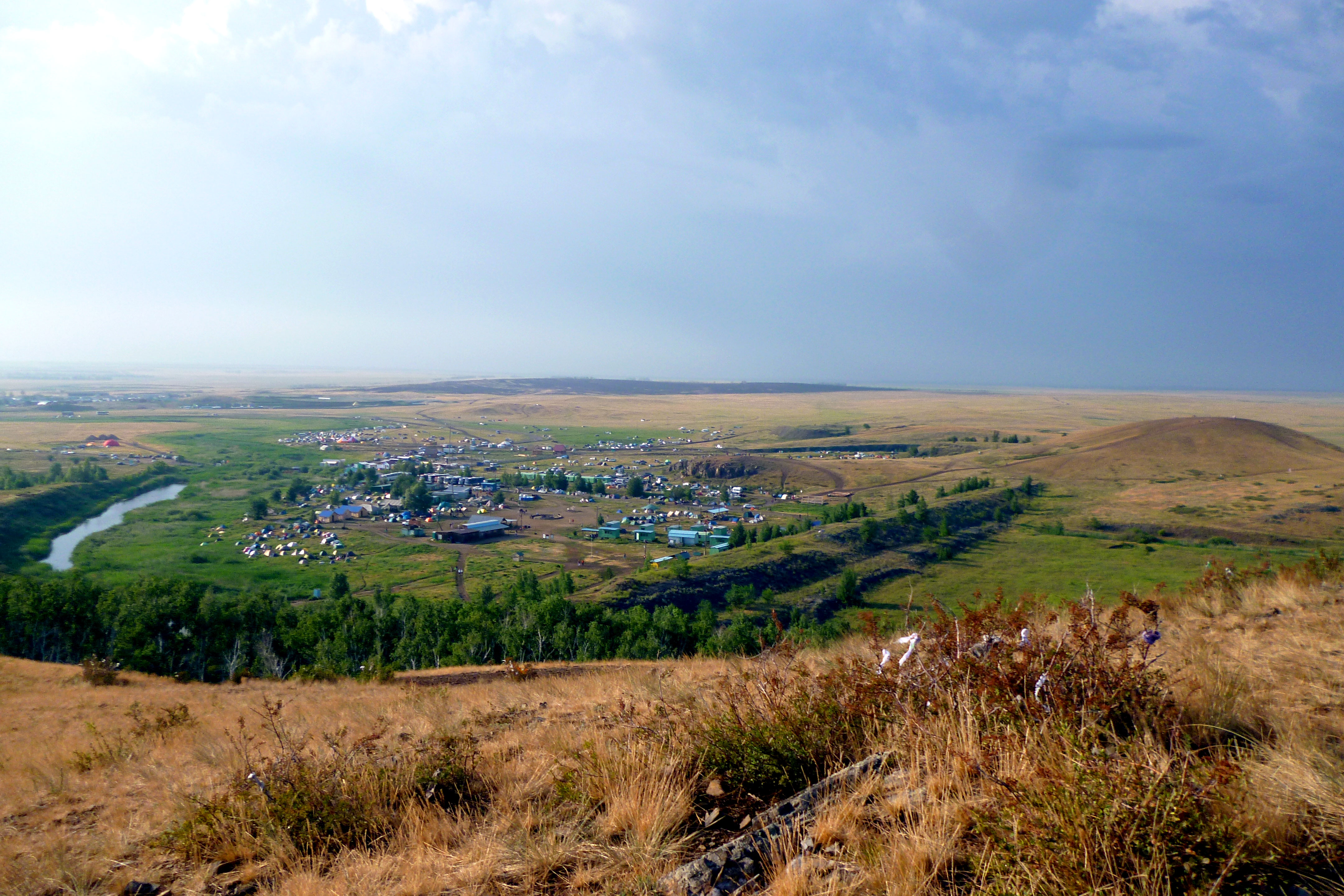
- Arkaim, near archaeological site, Bredinsky District

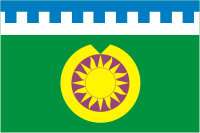
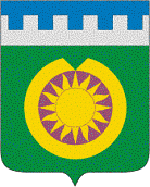
- Flag Coat of arms
- Location of Bredinsky District in Chelyabinsk Oblast
- Coordinates: 52°25′06″N 60°20′45″E
- Country: Russia
- Federal subject: Chelyabinsk Oblast
- Administrative center: Bredy

Area
  - Total: 5,076 km^{2} (1,960 sq mi)

Population (2010 Census)
  - Total: 28,498
  - Density: 5.614/km^{2} (14.54/sq mi)
  - Urban: 0%
  - Rural: 100%

Administrative structure
  - Administrative divisions: 11 selsoviet
  - Inhabited localities: 37 rural localities

Municipal structure
  - Municipally incorporated as: Bredinsky Municipal District
  - Municipal divisions: 0 urban settlements, 11 rural settlements
- Time zone: UTC+5 (MSK+2)
- OKTMO ID: 75612000
- Website: http://www.bredy.ru/

Bredinsky District (Russian: Брединский райо́н) is an administrative and municipal district (raion), one of the twenty-seven in Chelyabinsk Oblast, Russia. It is located in the south of the oblast. The area of the district is 5,076 square kilometers (1,960 sq mi). Its administrative center is the rural locality (a settlement) of Bredy. Population: 28,498 (2010 census); 33,039 (2002 Census); 30,750 (1989 Soviet census). The population of Bredy accounts for 33.2% of the district's total population.
