= Ostrolensky =

Village in Chelyabinsk Oblast, Russia

Ostrolensky Остроле́нский
- Rural locality
- Interactive map of Ostrolensky
- Location of Ostrolensky Ostrolensky (Russia)
- Coordinates: 53°41′10″N 59°43′51″E
- Country: Russia
- Federal subject: Chelyabinsk Oblast
- Founded: 1842–1843

Population
  - Estimate (2021): 1,755 )
- Time zone: UTC+5 (MSK+2)
- Postal code: 457663
- OKTMO ID: 75642460101

Ostrolensky (Russian: Остроле́нский) is a rural locality (a village) in Nagaybaksky District, Chelyabinsk Oblast, in the Asian part of Russia. It has a population of 2,021 (2010 census);

== History ==
The settlement was founded in 1842–1843, and named after the Polish city of Ostrołęka, to commemorate the Battle of Ostrołęka (1831).

== Demographics ==
Distribution of the population by ethnicity according to the 2021 census:

	percent
Nağaybäk	64.67%
Russians	29.91%
Kazakhs	1.42%
Tatars	1.25%
Bashkirs	0.40%
Uzbeks	0.28%
Refused answer, no nationality or no information	1.82%
