= Parizh, Chelyabinsk Oblast =

Village in Chelyabinsk Oblast, Russia

Parizh Пари́ж
- Rural locality
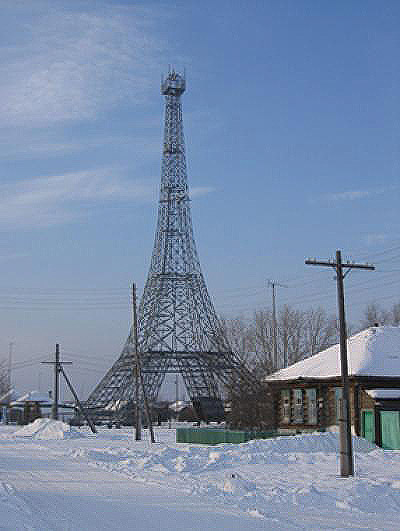
- Eiffel Tower replica in the village
- Interactive map of Parizh
- Location of Parizh Parizh (Russia)
- Coordinates: 53°17′51″N 60°05′59″E
- Country: Russia
- Federal subject: Chelyabinsk Oblast
- Founded: 1842

Population
  - Estimate (2021): 1,385 )
- Time zone: UTC+5 (MSK+2)
- Postal code: 457654
- OKTMO ID: 75642470101

Parizh (Russian: Пари́ж, for "Paris") is a village (selo) in Nagaybaksky District of Chelyabinsk Oblast, Russia, located on the south border of the district. Population: 2,390 (1997 est.).

== History ==
It was established as a Nağaybäk Cossack settlement in 1842 and soon after was given its name to honor the Battle of Paris. Several other villages named for Russian victories in Napoleonic Wars are located nearby: Fershampenuaz (the administrative center of the district), Leyptsig, Berlin, and others.

In 2005, an Eiffel Tower 1:7 replica was constructed in Parizh to serve as a cellular network station.

== Demographics ==
Distribution of the population by ethnicity according to the 2021 census:

	percent
Nağaybäk	64.55%
Russians	28.66%
Tatars	1.73%
Kazakhs	1.66%
Bashkirs	1.30%
Ukrainians	0.29%
Refused answer or no information	0.79%
