= Ablyazovo =

Ablyazovo Аблязово
- Settlement
- Location within Chelyabinsk Oblast Location within Russia
- Coordinates: 53°13′N 59°19′E
- Country: Russia
- Region: Chelyabinsk Oblast
- District: Agapovsky District
- Time zone: [[UTC+5:00]]

Ablyazovo (Russian: Аблязово) is a rural locality (a settlement) in Agapovskoye Rural Settlement of Agapovsky District, Chelyabinsk Oblast, Russia. The population was 399 as of 2010. There are 3 streets.

== History ==
In 1902, Cossacks and Tatars founded the village on the lands of the Cossack settlement Prechistenskaya Orenburg Governorate. It had the operational mosque (closed in the 30th of XX century, were not saved up to now). In 1929, in the period of collectivization, the kolkhoz Kyzyl Bayrak (the Red Banner) was organized. Since 1970, the third department of the Agapovsky state farm (now Agapovskoe CJSC) operated on the territory of the settlement.

== Geography ==
The settlement is located on the left bank of the Ural River, 10 km south of Agapovka (the district's administrative centre) by road. Kharkovsky is the nearest rural locality.
