= Varnensky District =

Varnensky District Варненский район (Russian)
- District
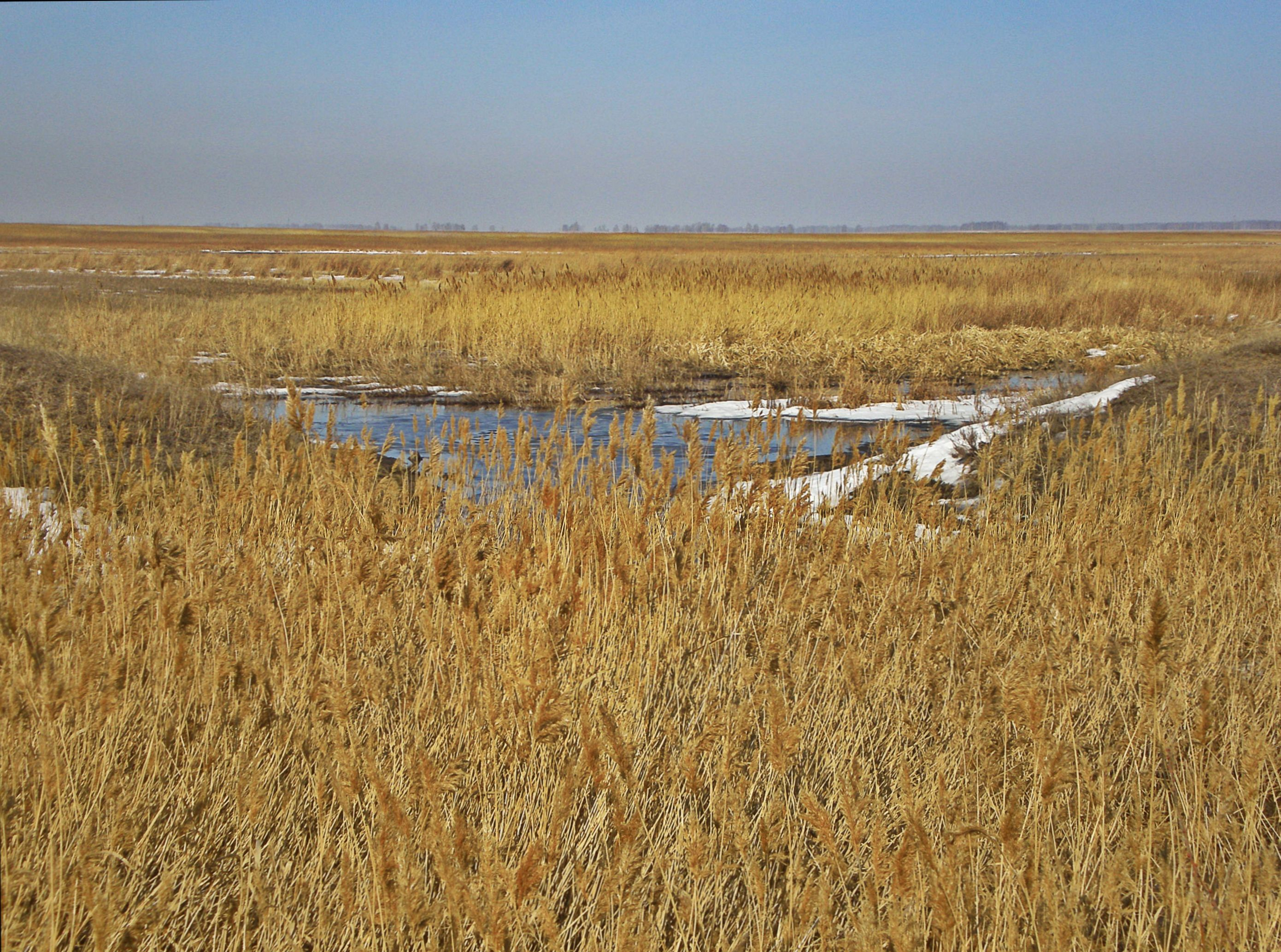
- Urochishte Kessel, Varnensky District

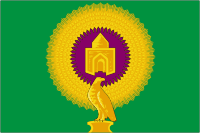
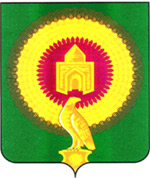
- Flag Coat of arms
- Location of Varnensky District in Chelyabinsk Oblast
- Coordinates: 53°22′50″N 60°58′44″E
- Country: Russia
- Federal subject: Chelyabinsk Oblast
- Established: 4 November 1926
- Administrative center: Varna

Area
  - Total: 3,853 km^{2} (1,488 sq mi)

Population (2010 Census)
  - Total: 27,357
  - Density: 7.100/km^{2} (18.39/sq mi)
  - Urban: 0%
  - Rural: 100%

Administrative structure
  - Administrative divisions: 13 selsoviet
  - Inhabited localities: 37 rural localities

Municipal structure
  - Municipally incorporated as: Varnensky Municipal District
  - Municipal divisions: 0 urban settlements, 13 rural settlements
- Time zone: UTC+5 (MSK+2)
- OKTMO ID: 75614000
- Website: http://www.varna74.ru/

Varnensky District (Russian: Варненский район; Kazakh: Варна ауданы, Varna aýdany) is an administrative and municipal district (raion), one of the twenty-seven in Chelyabinsk Oblast, Russia. It is located in the southeast of the oblast. The area of the district is 3,853 square kilometers (1,488 sq mi). Its administrative center is the rural locality (a selo) of Varna. Population: 27,357 (2010 census); 30,802 (2002 Census); 30,773 (1989 Soviet census). The population of Varna accounts for 36.1% of the district's total population.
