= Praha, Slovakia =

Praha Gácsprága
- Municipality
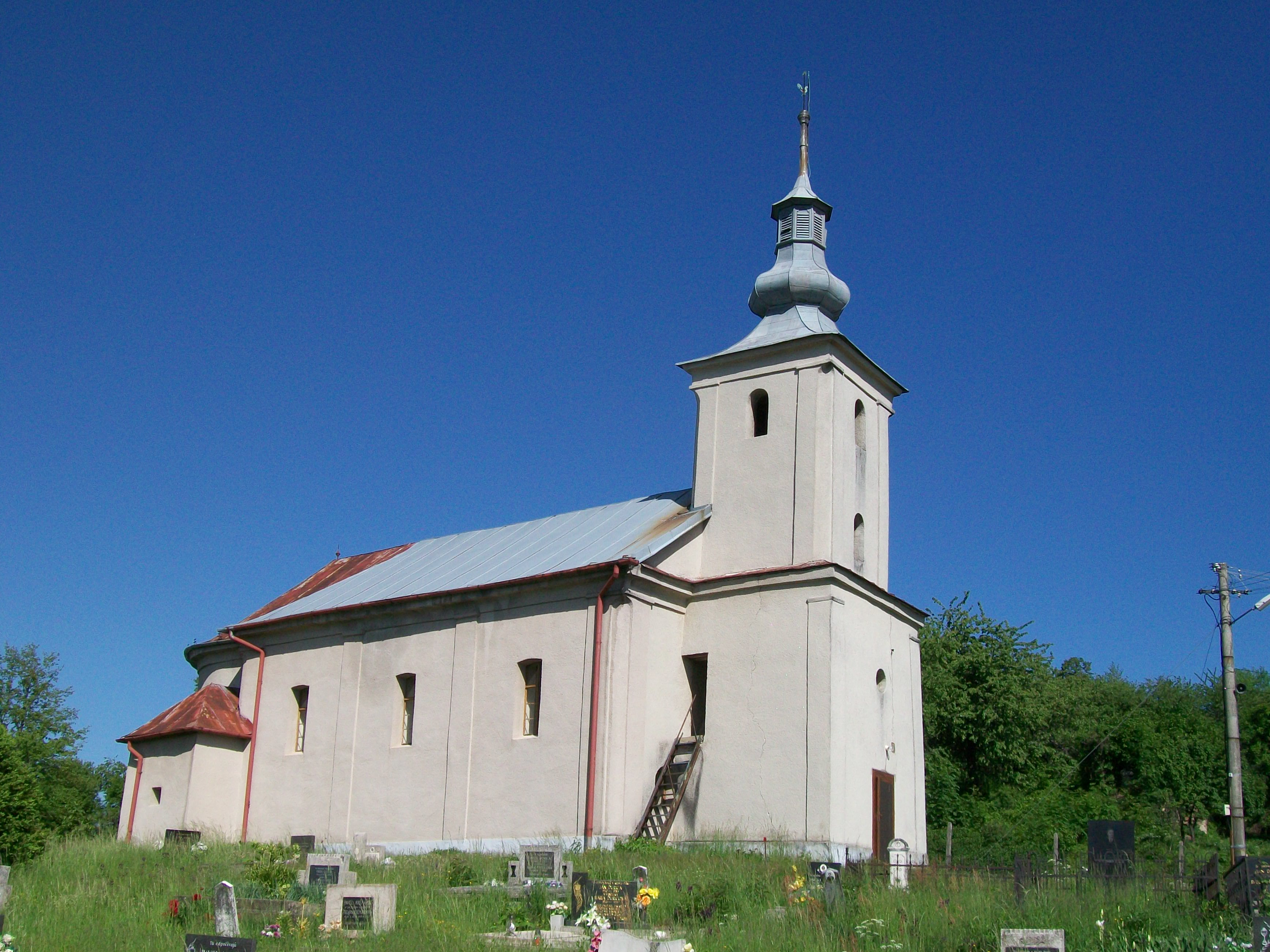
- Lutherian Church in Praha

- Flag Coat of arms

- Location of Praha in the Banská Bystrica Region Location of Praha in Slovakia
- Coordinates: 48°22′N 19°31′E
- Country: Slovakia
- Region: Banská Bystrica Region
- District: Lučenec District
- First mentioned: 1573

Area
  - Total: 9.29 km^{2} (3.59 sq mi)
- Elevation: 499 m (1,637 ft)

Population (2025)
  - Total: 78
- Time zone: UTC+1 (CET)
  - Summer (DST): UTC+2 (CEST)
- Postal code: 985 11
- Area code: +421 47
- Vehicle registration plate (until 2022): LC
- Website: praha-m.estranky.sk

Praha (Hungarian: Gácsprága) is a village and municipality in the Lučenec District in the Banská Bystrica Region of Slovakia.

Praha was founded by the Hussites in the 15th century, the name being inspired by the name of Prague, the Czech capital. The Hussite tradition is also reflected on the coat of arms, which shows the characteristic Hussite chalice.

== Geography ==
The municipality lies at an altitude of 499 metres (1,637 ft) and covers an area of 9.29 km^{2} (3.59 sq mi) (2025).

== Population ==
Population statistic (10 years)
Year	1995	2005	2015	2025
Count	87	105	86	78
Difference		+20.68%	−18.09%	−9.30%

Population statistic
Year	2024	2025
Count	74	78
Difference		+5.40%

It has a population of 78 people (31 December 2025).

=== Ethnicity ===
Census 2021 (1+ %)
Ethnicity	Number	Fraction
Slovak	71	94.66%
Hungarian	3	4%
Not found out	2	2.66%
Czech	1	1.33%
Total	75	

In year 2021 was 75 people by ethnicity 71 as Slovak, 3 as Hungarian, 2 as Not found out and 1 as Czech.

Note on population: The difference values of population numbers in the table "Population statistic" and in the sections "Ethnicity" & "Religion" is caused by the use of various statistical methods.

=== Religion ===
Census 2021 (1+ %)
Religion	Number	Fraction
Evangelical Church	26	34.67%
Roman Catholic Church	23	30.67%
None	18	24%
Jehovah's Witnesses	3	4%
Not found out	3	4%
Old Catholic Church	1	1.33%
Calvinist Church	1	1.33%
Total	75	

In year 2021 was 75 people by religion 26 from Evangelical Church, 23 from Roman Catholic Church, 18 from None, 3 from Jehovah's Witnesses, 3 from Not found out, 1 from Old Catholic Church and 1 from Calvinist Church.
