= Berlin, Russia =

Village in Chelyabinsk Oblast, Russia

Berlin Берлин
- Rural locality
- Interactive map of Berlin
- Location of Berlin
- Coordinates: 54°0′22″N 61°11′35″E
- Country: Russia
- Federal subject: Chelyabinsk Oblast
- Founded: 1842

Population
  - Estimate (2010): 613 )
- Time zone: UTC+5 (MSK+2)
- Postal code: 457130
- OKTMO ID: 75654440111

Berlin (Russian: Берлин) is a rural locality (a village) in Troitsky District, Chelyabinsk Oblast of Russia in North Asia, close to the border with Kazakhstan. It has a population of 613 (2010 census);

== History ==
The settlement was founded in 1842, and named after Berlin, to commemorate the Russian capture of the city in 1760 and 1813.

It is one of several villages in the Chelyabinsk Oblast named after major European cities, other including Varshavka (named after Warsaw), Parizh (named after Paris), Leyptsig (named after Leipzig), Varna (named after Varna) and Bredy (named after Breda).
