= Abdulka =

Abdulka Абдулка
- Settlement
- Location within Chelyabinsk Oblast Location within Russia
- Coordinates: 55°02′N 57°11′E
- Country: Russia
- Region: Chelyabinsk Oblast
- District: Ashinsky District
- Time zone: [[UTC+5:00]]

Abdulka (Russian: Абдулка) is a rural locality (a settlement) in Tochilninskoye Rural Settlement of Ashinsky District, Chelyabinsk Oblast, Russia. The population was 12 as of 2010.

== Geography ==
Abdulka is located 9 km northwest of Asha (the district's administrative centre) by road. Krasny Yar is the nearest rural locality.
