= Abdrakhmanova =

Abdrakhmanova Абдрахманова
- Village
- Location within Chelyabinsk Oblast Location within Russia
- Coordinates: 55°52′N 59°50′E
- Country: Russia
- Region: Chelyabinsk Oblast
- District: Nyazepetrovsky District
- Time zone: [[UTC+5:00]]

Abdrakhmanova (Russian: Абдрахманова) is a rural locality (a village) in Grivenskoye Rural Settlement of Nyazepetrovsky District, Chelyabinsk Oblast, Russia. The population was 7 as of 2010. There is 1 street.

== Geography ==
The village is located on the left bank of the Karsanak River, 52 km southeast of Nyazepetrovsk (the district's administrative centre) by road. Ufimka is the nearest rural locality.
