= Fère-Champenoise =

- Commune
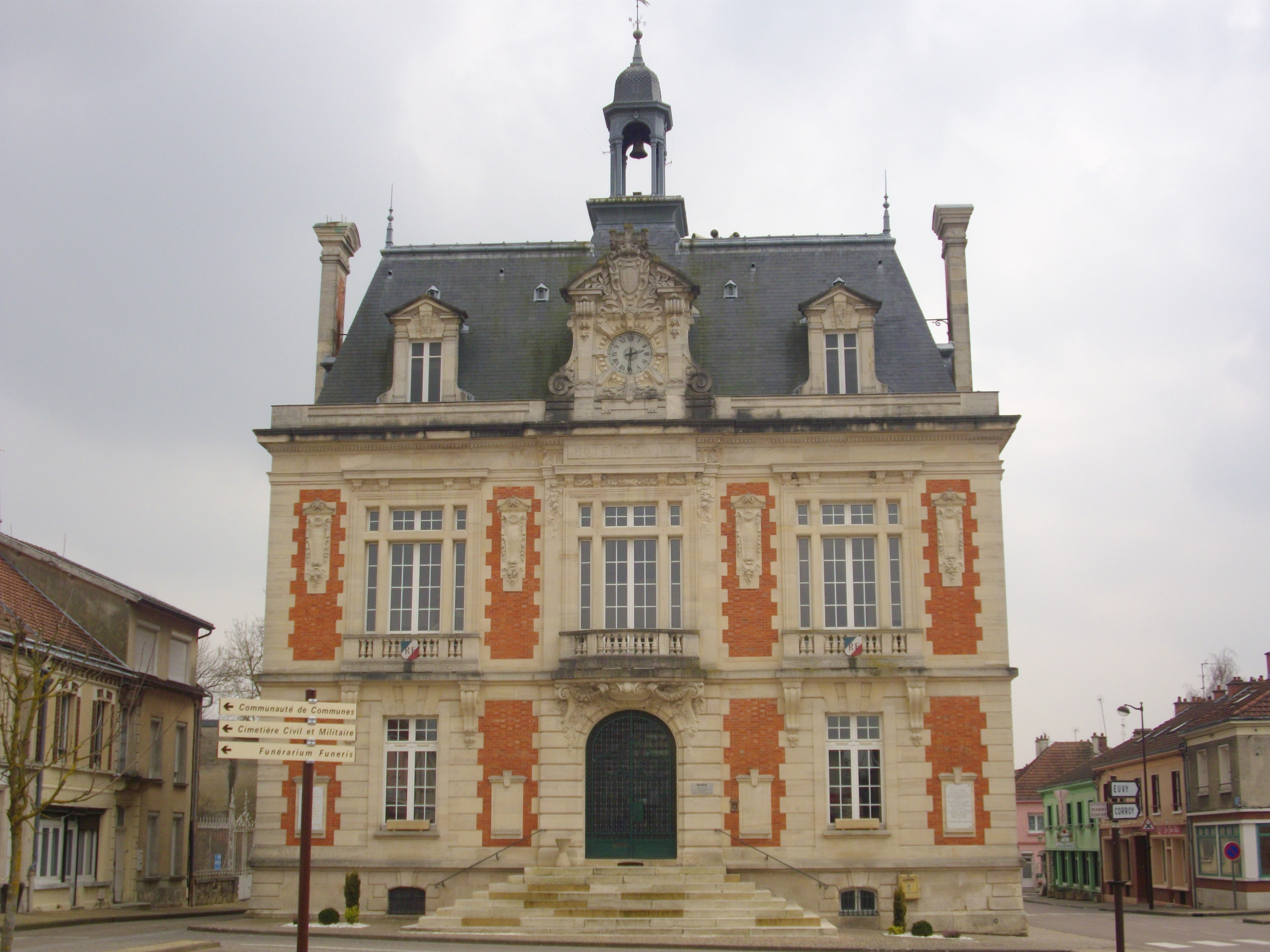
- Town hall

- Coat of arms
- Location of Fère-Champenoise
- Location within France Location within Grand Est
- Coordinates: 48°45′15″N 3°59′29″E
- Country: France
- Region: Grand Est
- Department: Marne
- Arrondissement: Épernay
- Canton: Vertus-Plaine Champenoise
- Intercommunality: Sud Marnais

Government
  - Mayor (2020–2026): Gérard Gorisse
- Area^{1}: 65.89 km^{2} (25.44 sq mi)
- Elevation: 140 m (460 ft)
- Population (2023): 2,173
  - Density: 32.98/km^{2} (85.42/sq mi)
- Time zone: UTC+01:00 (CET)
  - Summer (DST): UTC+02:00 (CEST)
- INSEE/Postal code: 51248 /51230
- ^{1} French Land Register data, which excludes lakes, ponds, glaciers > 1 km^{2} (0.386 sq mi or 247 acres) and river estuaries.

Fère-Champenoise (French pronunciation: [fɛʁ ʃɑ̃p(ə)nwaz]) is a commune in the Marne department in north-eastern France. It was the site of the Battle of Fère-Champenoise in March 1814.

== Population ==
Historical population
Year	Pop.	±% p.a.
1968	2,252	—
1975	2,544	+1.76%
1982	2,518	−0.15%
1990	2,362	−0.80%
1999	2,293	−0.33%
2007	2,310	+0.09%
2012	2,285	−0.22%
2017	2,145	−1.26%
2023	2,173	+0.22%
Source: INSEE

== See also ==
- Communes of the Marne department
- Fershampenuaz, a village in Russia, named after the 1814 battle.
