= Nağaybäk =

Ethnic group in Russian Ural-Volga region

Nagaibak
нагайбәкләр
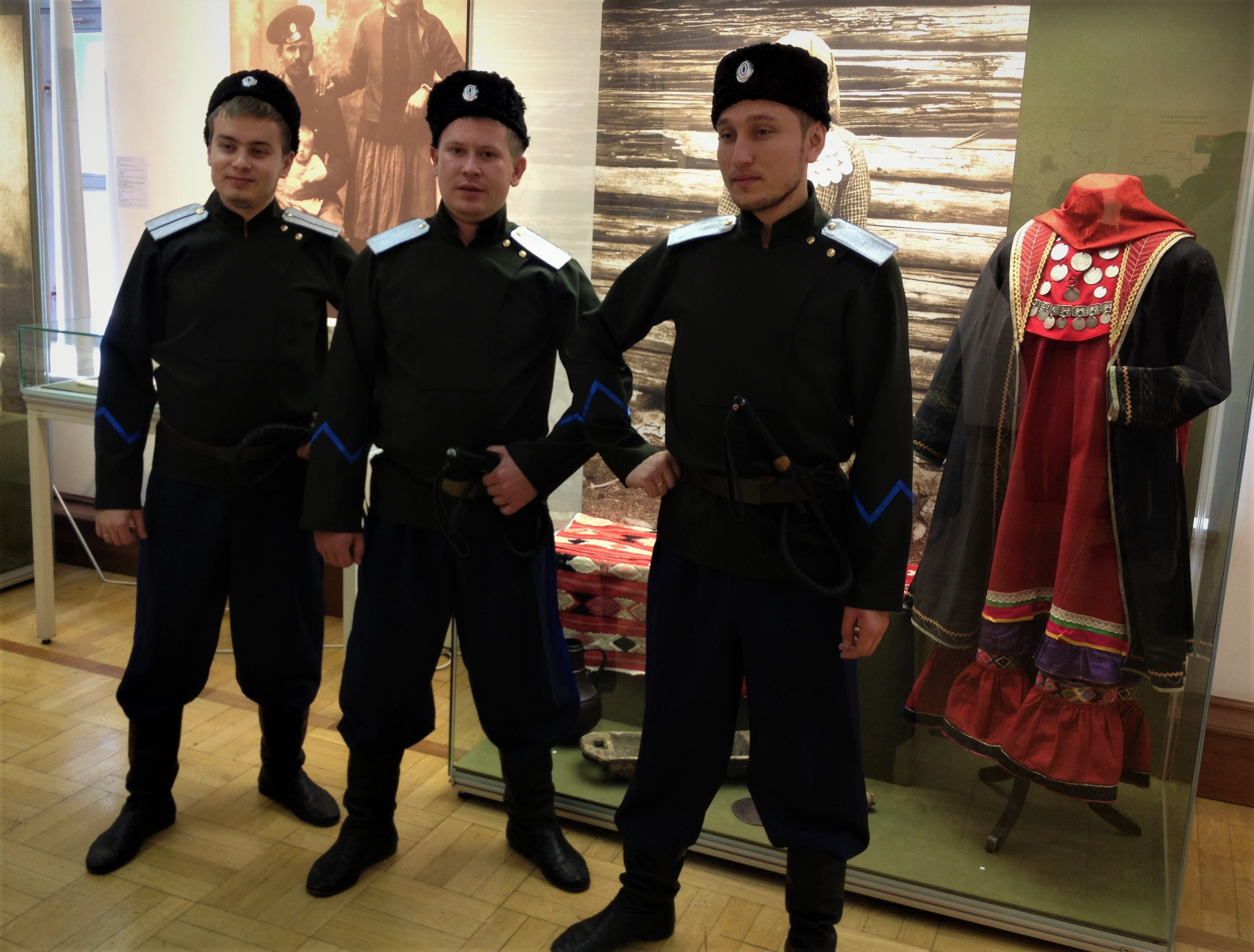

Total population
- 5,719 (2021)

Languages
- Volga Tatar (Nagaibak)

Religion
- Russian Orthodoxy

Related ethnic groups
- Orenburg Cossacks, other Volga Tatars (especially Kryashens), and Nogais

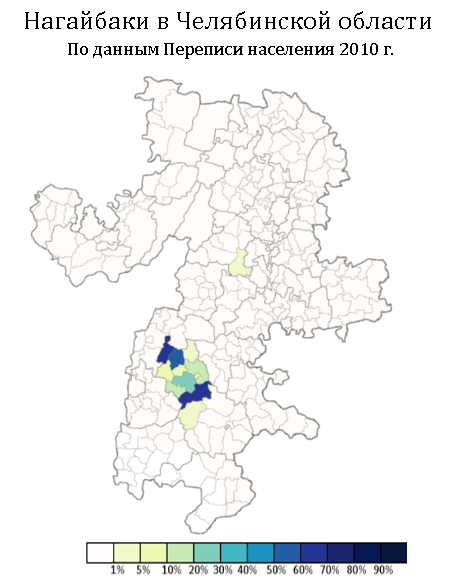
Percentage of Nağaybäk in Chelyabinsk Oblast

Nağaybäks (/ˈnɑːɡaɪbæks/ NAH-gy-baks) (Note: Tatar: Нагайбәкләр, Nağaybäklär, IPA: [nɒʁɒɪbækˈlær]; Russian: Нагайбаки) are an ethnoreligious group of Volga Tatars in Russia, recognized as a separate people under Russian legislation. Most Nağaybäks live in the Nagaybaksky and Chebarkulsky Districts of the Chelyabinsk Oblast. They speak a sub-dialect of the Tatar language's middle dialect known as the Nagaibak dialect. Russian and Tatar historians usually treat the Nağaybäks as an integral part of Volga Tatars; a minority considers Nağaybäks a separate ethnicity in their own right. In the 1989 Russian census, 11,200 people identified themselves as Nağaybäks, falling to 9,600 in 2002.

== Origin ==
The origins of the Nağaybäks are unclear. One theory places the Nağaybäks as an offshoot of the Nogais. Other accounts claim that they are Volga Tatars baptized after the fall of Kazan Khanate. The most plausible theory, according to the 1994 Great Russian Encyclopedia, says that the ancestors of the Nağaybäks traditionally lived in central districts of the Khanate, east of Kazan, and most likely descended from Nogay and Kipchak people. In the 18th century, they also assimilated a small group of Christians from Iran and Central Asia.

The most popular theory in Tatarstan is that they were Serving Tatars from Kazan Khanate that were forcibly baptized by Ivan IV and relocated to the border between nomad Bashkirs, that were already incorporated to Russia and nomad Kazakhs as border keepers. Yet another theory says that the Nağaybäks were Tatarized Finno-Ugric peoples that kept the Kazan Khanate's borders.

Demonym Nağaybäk emerged in written sources only in the 19th century although a fringe theory asserts its existence as far as the 17th century. The village of Nagaybak, which gave name to present-day Nagaybaksky District, is known since the 1730s.

== Historical record ==
Reliable historical evidence of Nağaybäk people start with a 1729 record detailing 25 villages of "newly baptized [Tatars]" (Russian: новокрещёны) in Ufa uezd, east of the Kama River. Most likely, they settled around Ufa in the second half of the 17th century after the completion of the defensive Kama Abatis Line (1652–1656). During the Tatar and Bashkir revolts of late 17th and early 18th century the Nağaybäks remained loyal to the Russian Empire. The government rewarded them with a wholesale transfer of the Nağaybäks into the Cossack estate, and assigned the Nağaybäks to the defense of Menzelinsk Fort.

Another defensive fort was built in 1736 in the village of Nagaybak, 64 versts from Menzelinsk (present-day Bakalinsky District). The new fortress became the hub of the "newly baptized", and by 1744 the nearby Nağaybäk population increased to 1359 people in eleven villages. Two more Nağaybäk villages were recorded in 1795. The original Nağaybäk race was gradually diluted with an inflow of other Christianized Tatars recruited into cossack service (Yasak Tatars and Tiptärs). The government mandated their relocation into predominantly Christian Nağaybäk lands to evade daily contact between Christian and Muslim Tatars, and the new settlers rapidly intermarried with the locals.

In 1773, Nagaybak Fort was caught in the way of Yemelyan Pugachev's rebellion. Loyal cossacks and troops, headed by captain Rushinsky, fled to Menzelinsk; most of the remaining soldiers joined the rebellion and participated in the siege of Ufa. Pugachev installed a "newly baptized Persian" by the name of Tornov, as the ataman of Nagaybak. In January 1774, a small government company pushed the rebels out of Nagaybak Fort, but Tornov returned in strength and regained control over the fort. Two weeks later a whole corps of government troops crushed the rebellion. The fort became a base for punitive expeditions against the remains of Pugachev's army.

Nağaybäk cavalry participated in the Napoleonic Wars and in the subsequent occupation of Paris. In 1842, the Nağaybäk cossacks relocated from their former host in Nagaybak Fort eastward, to the former Orenburg Governorate. Here, they founded a chain of villages named after the battles of Napoleonic Wars, including present-day Parizh, named after the Battle of Paris in 1814, Fershampenuaz (after the Battle of Fère-Champenoise), Kassel (after engagements near Kassel in Hesse), Trebiy (after the Battle of Trebbia) in 1799, etc. Fershampenuaz remains the center of Nagaybaksky District to present. Another group of the Nağaybäk settled in present-day Orenburg Oblast. These Nağaybäks settled on traditionally Muslim territories, and by the beginning of the 20th century they converted back to Islam and were reassimilated into Tatar ethnos.

== Culture ==
Most Nağaybäks are Christian and were largely converted during the 18th century.

Traditional Nağaybäk female clothing is similar to that of the Keräşen Tatars, but male clothing contains many elements of the Cossack uniform.

== See also ==
- Keräşen Tatars
- Orenburg Cossacks
