= Abdyrova =

Abdyrova Абдырова
- Village
- Location within Chelyabinsk Oblast Location within Russia
- Coordinates: 55°23′N 61°04′E
- Country: Russia
- Region: Chelyabinsk Oblast
- District: Argayashsky District
- Time zone: [[UTC+5:00]]

Abdyrova (Russian: Абдырова) is a rural locality (a village) in Derbishevskoye Rural Settlement of Argayashsky District, Chelyabinsk Oblast, Russia. The population was 245 as of 2010. There are 15 streets.

== Geography ==
Abdyrova is located on the bank of Maly Kisegach Lake, 18 km southeast of Argayash (the district's administrative centre) by road. Ishalino is the nearest rural locality.

== Ethnicity ==
The village is inhabited by Bashkirs and others.
