= Polotskoye, Chelyabinsk Oblast =

Village in Chelyabinsk Oblast, Russia

Polotskoye Полоцкое
- Rural locality
- Interactive map of Polotskoye
- Location of Polotskoye Polotskoye (Russia)
- Coordinates: 52°46′4″N 59°42′24″E
- Country: Russia
- Federal subject: Chelyabinsk Oblast
- Founded: 1842

Population
  - Estimate (2021): 933 )
- Time zone: UTC+5 (MSK+2)
- Postal code: 457625
- OKTMO ID: 75632470101

Polotskoye (Russian: Полоцкое) is a rural locality (a village) in Kizilsky District, Chelyabinsk Oblast, in the Asian part of Russia. It has a population of 1,194 (2010 census);

== History ==
The settlement was founded in 1842–1843, and named after the city of Polotsk, to commemorate the 1812 Battle of Polotsk.

== Demographics ==
Distribution of the population by ethnicity according to the 2021 census:

	percent
Russians	73.20%
Kazakhs	19.61%
Bashkirs	2.89%
Belarusians	0.64%
Tatars	0.64%
Azeris	0.54%
Refused answer, no nationality or no information	1.82%
