= Fershampenuaz =

Village in Nagaybaksky District, Chelyabinsk Oblast, Russia

Fershampenuaz Фершампенуаз
- Village (selo)
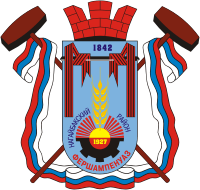
- Seal
- Interactive map of Fershampenuaz
- Coordinates: 53°31′N 59°48′E
- Country: Russia
- Federal subject: Chelyabinsk Oblast
- District: Nagaybaksky District
- Founded: 1842

Population (2021)
  - Total: 4,048
- Time zone: UTC+5
- Postal code: 457650

Fershampenuaz (Фершампенуа́з, from Fère-Champenoise) is a rural locality (a selo) and the administrative center of Nagaybaksky District in Chelyabinsk Oblast, Russia. It is located in the southern Urals, approximately 60 km southwest of Magnitogorsk.

== History ==
Fershampenuaz was founded in 1842 as a settlement of Nağaybäk Cossacks of the Orenburg Cossack Host. Like several other settlements in the region, such as Parizh and Berlin, it was named to commemorate Russian victories over Napoleon during the Napoleonic Wars.

The village takes its name from the Battle of Fère-Champenoise (1814), in which allied Russian, Austrian, and Prussian forces defeated French troops during the campaign that led to the fall of Paris.

== Population ==
According to the 2010 Russian Census, Fershampenuaz had a population of 4,368. The village has historically been associated with the Nagaybak ethnic group, a Turkic-speaking community traditionally affiliated with Orthodox Christianity.

Distribution of the population by ethnicity according to the 2021 census:

	percent
Russians	54.15%
Nağaybäk	26.26%
Kazakhs	7.78%
Tatars	4.00%
Mordvins	1.01%
Bashkirs	0.99%
Germans	0.42%
Ukrainians	0.40%
Koreans	0.30%
Belarusians	0.30%
Refused answer, no nationality or no information	3.58%

== Economy ==
The local economy is based primarily on agriculture and food processing. Fershampenuaz hosts grain storage and processing facilities as well as poultry production enterprises serving the surrounding rural area.

== Infrastructure ==
Fershampenuaz contains district-level administrative institutions, a secondary school, healthcare facilities, cultural institutions, and sports infrastructure. The village is gasified and serves as a local service center for surrounding settlements.

== Notable people ==
- Leonid Smetannikov (born 1943), Soviet and Russian opera singer, People's Artist of the USSR
