= Kryashens =

Керәшеннәр
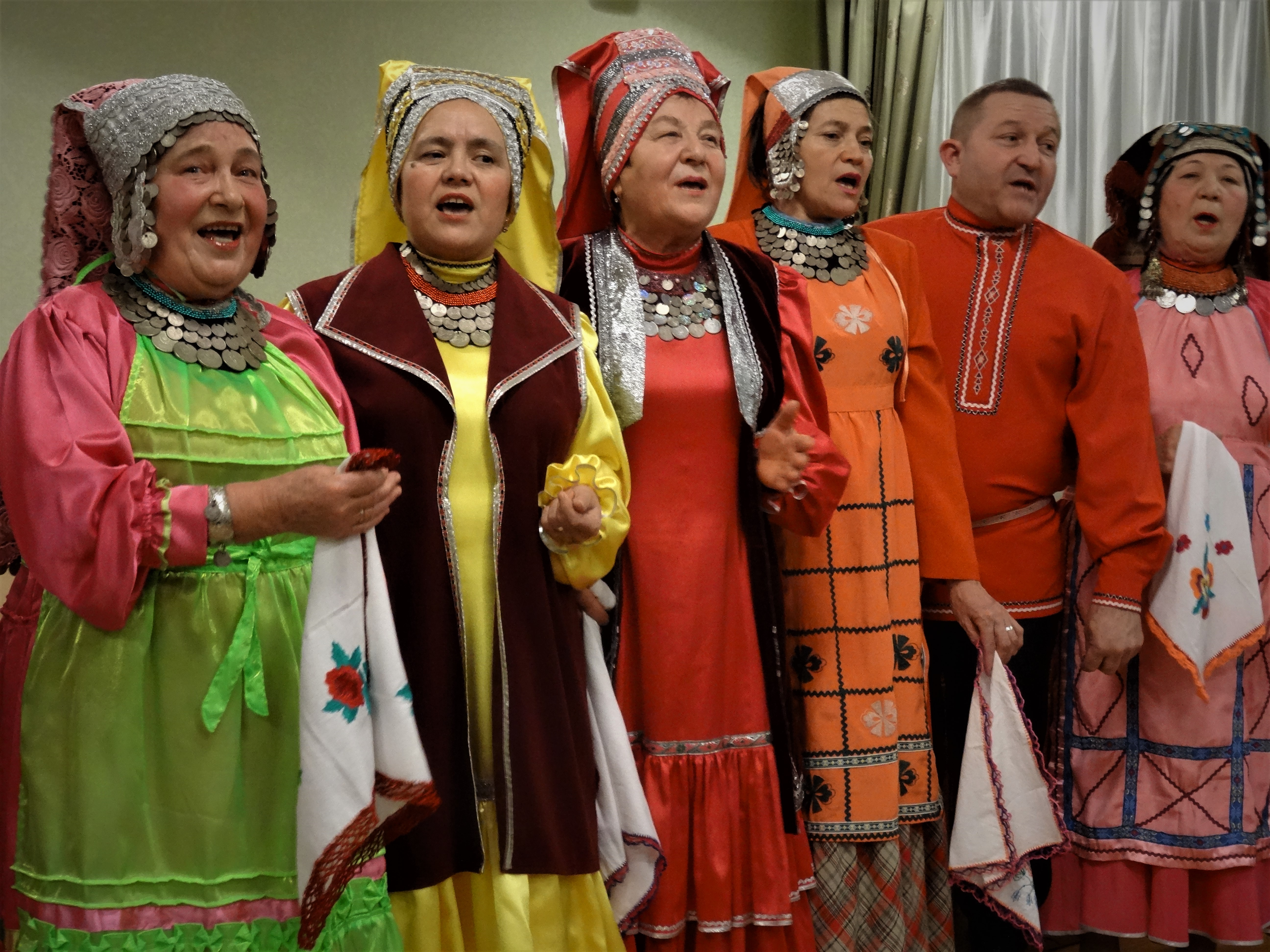

Total population
- 55,735

Regions with significant populations
- Russia: 34,882
- Kazakhstan: 20,913

Languages
- Tatar (Kryashen dialect), Russian

Religion
- Russian Orthodoxy

Related ethnic groups
- Other groups of Volga Tatars, Bashkirs, Chuvash, Nogais

Kryashens (Tatar: керәшен(нәр), [k(e)ræˈʃen(nær)], Russian: кряшены; sometimes called Baptised Tatars (Russian: крещёные тата́ры)) are a subgroup of the Volga Tatars, frequently referred to as one of the minority ethnic groups in Russia. They are mostly found in Tatarstan and in Udmurtia, Bashkortostan and Chelyabinsk Oblast.

Kryashens are Orthodox Christians, and some of them regard themselves as being different from other Tatars even though most Kryashen dialects differ only slightly from the central dialect of the Tatar language and do not differ from the accents of the Tatar Muslims in the same areas.

The 2010 census recorded 34,882 Kryashens in Russia.

== History ==
Scholars associate the formation of groups of Kryashens with the process of voluntary and violent Christianization of Muslim and Animist Volga Tatars and Nogais during the 16th to 19th centuries. The first wave of Kryashens were the result of forced conversions soon after the Russian conquest of the Kazan and Astrakhan Khanates. However, most of these converts reverted to Islam and Christianity made little headway among the Tatars.

A more lasting and significant presence of Kryashens emerged during a period of mosque destruction and anti-Muslim oppression from the Russian authorities during the 18th century. During the reign of Anna of Russia, many Muslims were forced or pressured to convert. New converts were exempted from paying taxes, were granted certain privileges, and were given better resources for the learning of their new faith. Many Tatars converted for economic or political reasons. Many continued to secretly practice Islam and were crypto-Muslims. By the end of the 19th century, several thousand once again had reverted to Islam. However, by the early 20th century, there was a significant Kryashen population that still continues to exist, though in smaller numbers than in the past.

In recent times the Kryashens have assimilated with Russians and other Tatar groups. There is a high intermarriage rate with Russians.

During Soviet times, an alternative version of the ethnogenesis of Kryashens emerged, which suggested that their ancestors adopted Christianity voluntarily during the times of Volga Bulgaria.

Kryashen Tatar historian Maxim Glukhov connected their roots to Keraites.

== Culture ==
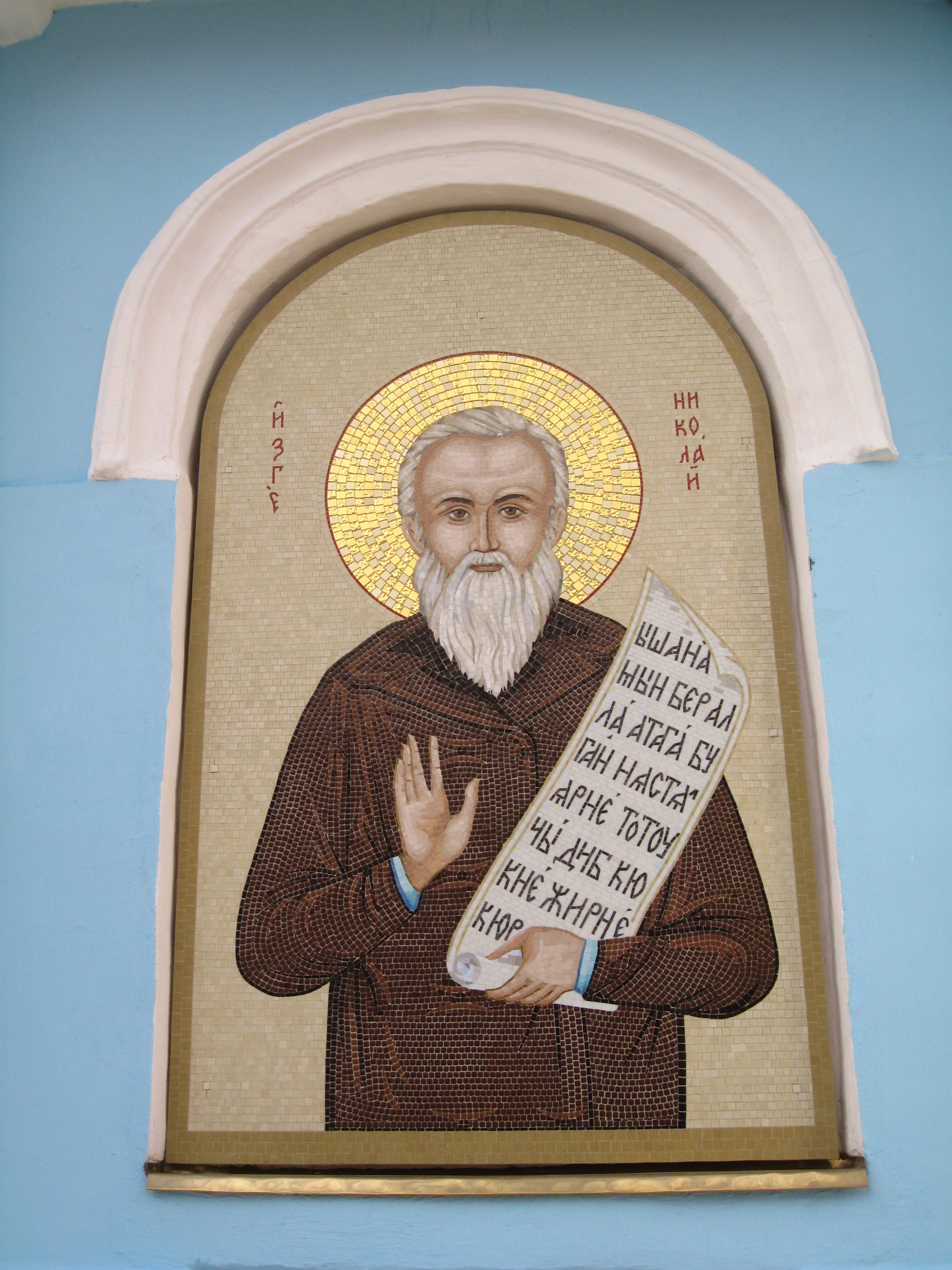
Mosaic image of Nikolay Ilminsky with the text of the "Nicene Creed" in the Tatar (Church Kryashen) language.

The earliest Kryashen works and literature were written using the Arabic script. However, an unaltered Cyrillic script was also used to translate religious material to Tatar. A modified Cyrillic script was adopted in 1862. By the early 20th century over 100 books were published using this script. In 1922, a modified Arabic script for writing Tatar was introduced to the Kryashens although the Cyrillic script continued in use until 1928 as this was when both scripts were replaced by the Latin script. The earliest literature was mainly religious in nature but around the 1910s a steady rise of secular works began being published. A newspaper for the Kryashen community was published from 1928 to 1929 in Kazan but soon ceased to exist afterwards.

The Kryashens had little religious and educational infrastructure in the 16th and 17th centuries. However, during the 18th century they were given many privileges and facilities were built or accommodated for the Kryashens. The first Tatar school for converts was established in 1863 while the first seminary was founded in 1872.

== Notable people of Kryashen descent ==
- Oleg Fazylzhanov
- Dmitry Karbyshev
- Pyotr Gavrilov
- Aleksei Antonov

== See also ==
- Nağaybäk
