= Varna, Russia =

Village in Chelyabinsk Oblast, Russia

Varna Варна
- Rural locality
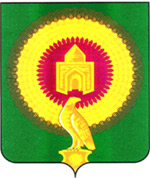
- Coat of arms
- Interactive map of Varna
- Location of Varna Varna (Russia)
- Coordinates: 53°22′50″N 60°58′49″E
- Country: Russia
- Federal subject: Chelyabinsk Oblast
- Founded: 1843
- Elevation: 248 m (814 ft)

Population
  - Estimate (2021): 10,365 )
- Time zone: UTC+5 (MSK+2)
- Postal code: 457200
- OKTMO ID: 75614420101

Varna (Russian: Варна) is a rural locality (a selo) and the administrative center of Varnensky District, Chelyabinsk Oblast, Russia. Population: 9,869 (2010 census); 9,978 (2002 census); 9,379 (1989 Soviet census).

== Etymology ==
The name of the locality refers to the Russo-Turkish War and the capture of the fortress of Varna by Russians in 1828.

== Demographics ==
Distribution of the population by ethnicity according to the 2021 census:

	percent
Russians	76.13%
Tatars	13.56%
Kazakhs	4.11%
Ukrainians	1.30%
Bashkirs	0.50%
Mordvins	0.48%
Romani	0.30%
Germans	0.26%
Azeris	0.21%
Tajiks	0.20%
Belarusians	0.18%
Refused answer, no nationality or no information	1.66%
