= Nagaybaksky District =

Nagaybaksky District Нагайбакский район (Russian)
- District
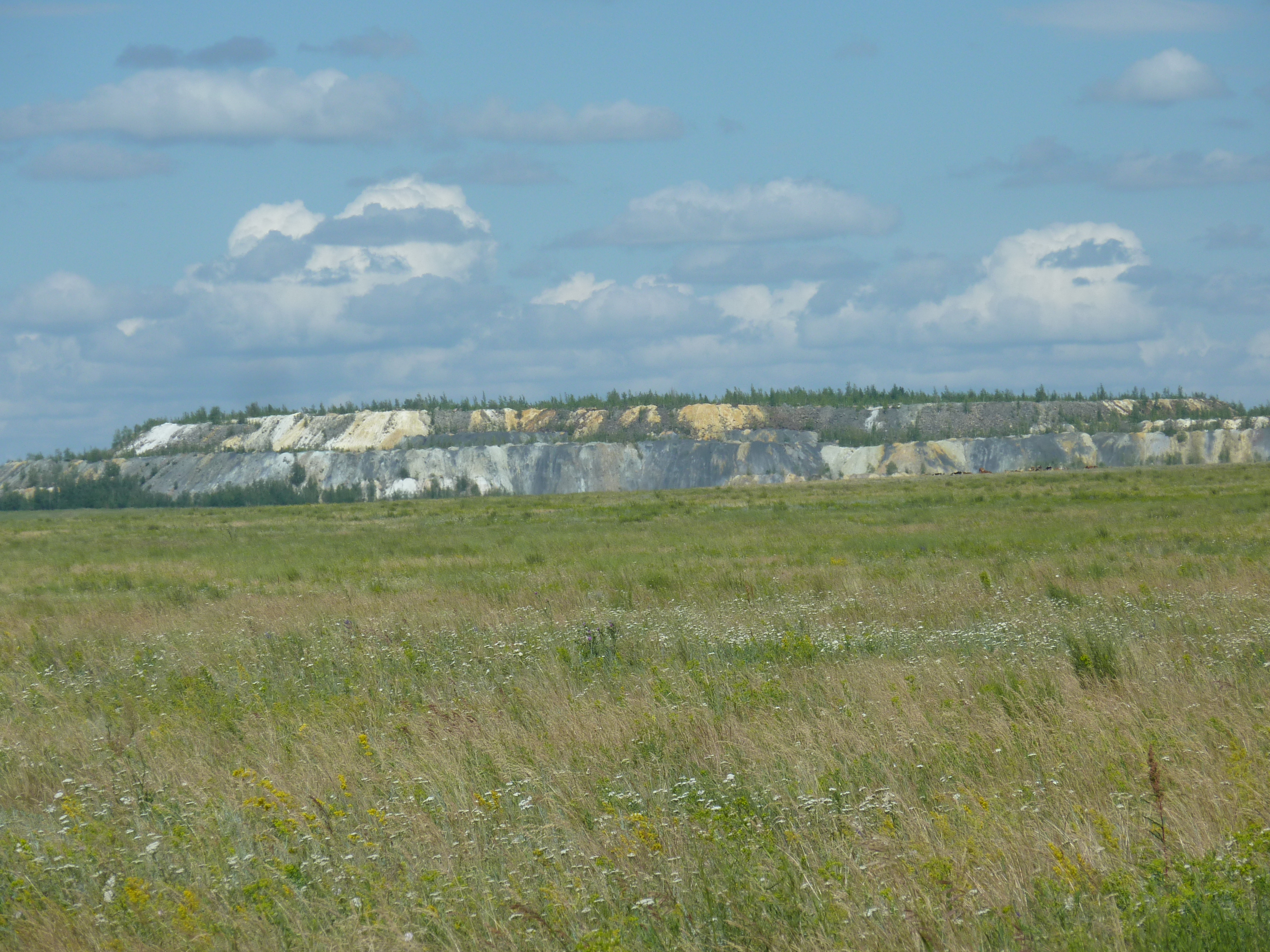
- Astafyevsky crystal quarry

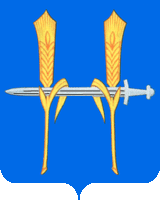
- Flag Coat of arms
- Location of Nagaybaksky District in Chelyabinsk Oblast
- Coordinates: 53°31′N 59°48′E
- Country: Russia
- Federal subject: Chelyabinsk Oblast
- Administrative center: Fershampenuaz

Area
  - Total: 3,022 km^{2} (1,167 sq mi)

Population (2010 Census)
  - Total: 20,927
  - Density: 6.925/km^{2} (17.94/sq mi)
  - Urban: 9.5%
  - Rural: 90.5%

Administrative structure
  - Administrative divisions: 1 Work settlements, 9 Selsoviets
  - Inhabited localities: 1 urban-type settlements, 36 rural localities

Municipal structure
  - Municipally incorporated as: Nagaybaksky Municipal District
  - Municipal divisions: 1 urban settlements, 9 rural settlements
- Time zone: UTC+5 (MSK+2)
- OKTMO ID: 75642000
- Website: http://www.nagaybak.ru/

Nagaybaksky District (Russian: Нагайба́кский райо́н) is an administrative and municipal district (raion), one of the twenty-seven in Chelyabinsk Oblast, Russia. It is located in the south of the oblast. The area of the district is 3,022 square kilometers (1,167 sq mi). Its administrative center is the rural locality (a selo) of Fershampenuaz. Population: 20,927 (2010 census); 24,310 (2002 Census); 25,959 (1989 Soviet census). The population of Fershampenuaz accounts for 20.9% of the district's total population.

== Symbols ==
The coat of arms and flag of Nagaybaksky District consists of two wheat stalks holding a sword on a blue field, symbolizing an agrarian population serving for the protection of other agrarians from nomads. The blue field symbolizes their Turkic steppe origin.
