= Bredy =

Rural locality in Chelyabinsk Oblast, Russia

Bredy Бреды
- Selo
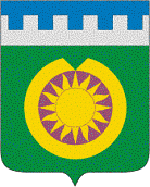
- Coat of arms
- Interactive map of Bredy
- Location of Bredy Bredy (Chelyabinsk Oblast)
- Coordinates: 52°25′19″N 60°20′14″E
- Country: Russia
- Federal subject: Chelyabinsk Oblast
- Administrative district: Bredinsky District
- SettlementSelsoviet: Bredinskoye Settlement
- Founded: 1843
- Rural locality status since: 1940
- Elevation: 302 m (991 ft)

Population (2010 Census)
  - Total: 9,468
  - Estimate (2021): 8,792 (−7.1%)

Administrative status
  - Capital of: Bredinsky District, Bredinskoye Settlement

Municipal status
  - Municipal district: Bredinsky Municipal District
  - Rural settlement: Bredinskoye Rural Settlement
  - Capital of: Bredinsky Municipal District, Bredinskoye Rural Settlement
- Time zone: UTC+5 (MSK+2)
- Postal code: 457310
- Dialing code: +7 35141
- OKTMO ID: 75612432101

Bredy (Russian: Бреды) is a rural locality (a settlement) and the administrative center of Bredinsky District, Chelyabinsk Oblast, Russia. Population: 8,792 (2021 Estimate); 9,468 (2010 census); 10,526 (2002 census); 10,104 (1989 Soviet census).

== Climate ==
Climate data for Bredy (extremes 1936-present)
| Month | Jan | Feb | Mar | Apr | May | Jun | Jul | Aug | Sep | Oct | Nov | Dec | Year |
|---|---|---|---|---|---|---|---|---|---|---|---|---|---|
| Record high °C (°F) | 2.8 (37.0) | 3.5 (38.3) | 18.7 (65.7) | 29.0 (84.2) | 36.3 (97.3) | 38.3 (100.9) | 40.7 (105.3) | 39.2 (102.6) | 36.1 (97.0) | 26.4 (79.5) | 15.8 (60.4) | 9.3 (48.7) | 40.7 (105.3) |
| Mean daily maximum °C (°F) | −10.1 (13.8) | −8.7 (16.3) | −1.4 (29.5) | 11.4 (52.5) | 21.0 (69.8) | 26.1 (79.0) | 27.0 (80.6) | 25.8 (78.4) | 19.2 (66.6) | 10.4 (50.7) | −1.0 (30.2) | −7.9 (17.8) | 9.3 (48.8) |
| Daily mean °C (°F) | −14.3 (6.3) | −13.6 (7.5) | −6.5 (20.3) | 5.3 (41.5) | 13.9 (57.0) | 19.1 (66.4) | 20.4 (68.7) | 18.8 (65.8) | 12.2 (54.0) | 4.5 (40.1) | −5.1 (22.8) | −12.0 (10.4) | 3.6 (38.4) |
| Mean daily minimum °C (°F) | −18.5 (−1.3) | −18.3 (−0.9) | −11.2 (11.8) | −0.3 (31.5) | 6.7 (44.1) | 11.8 (53.2) | 13.8 (56.8) | 12.1 (53.8) | 6.0 (42.8) | −0.4 (31.3) | −8.8 (16.2) | −16.0 (3.2) | −1.9 (28.5) |
| Record low °C (°F) | −41.5 (−42.7) | −47.2 (−53.0) | −37.7 (−35.9) | −28.9 (−20.0) | −8.8 (16.2) | −2.9 (26.8) | 2.2 (36.0) | −1.0 (30.2) | −11.8 (10.8) | −22.6 (−8.7) | −39.1 (−38.4) | −39.6 (−39.3) | −47.2 (−53.0) |
| Average precipitation mm (inches) | 21.9 (0.86) | 23.0 (0.91) | 22.9 (0.90) | 28.8 (1.13) | 37.4 (1.47) | 34.3 (1.35) | 48.6 (1.91) | 31.9 (1.26) | 21.4 (0.84) | 28.3 (1.11) | 22.2 (0.87) | 25.2 (0.99) | 345.9 (13.6) |
Source: Pogoda.ru.net
