= Korkino constituency =

Russian legislative constituency

Korkino single-member constituency
- Constituency of the Russian State Duma

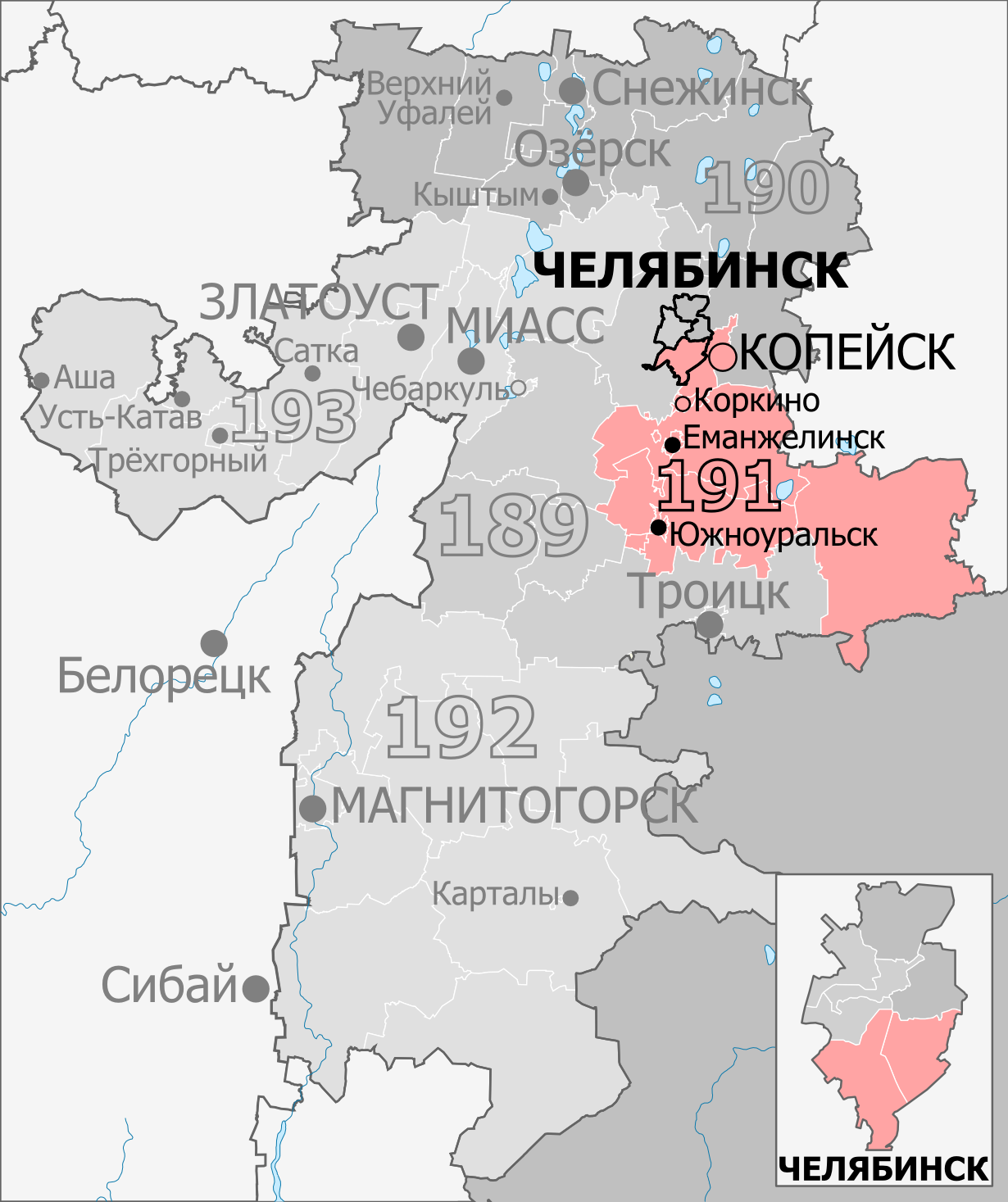
- Constituency boundaries since 2016
- Deputy: Valery Gartung; A Just Russia
- Federal subject: Chelyabinsk Oblast
- Districts: Chelyabinsk (Leninsky, Sovetsky), Kopeysk, Korkinsky, Oktyabrsky, Uvelsky, Yemanzhelinsky, Yetkulsky, Yuzhnouralsk
- Voters: 508,303 (2026)

The Korkino constituency (No.190 (Note: Sovetsky constituency No.186 in 1993–2007, No.191 in 2016–2026)) is a Russian legislative constituency in Chelyabinsk Oblast. The constituency covers southern Chelyabinsk and its suburbs, including Kopeysk, Korkino and Yemanzhelinsk, as well as areas to the south and south-east of the city.

The constituency has been represented since 2021 by A Just Russia deputy Valery Gartung, eight-term State Duma member and businessman, previously representing this seat in 1997–2007, who won the open seat, succeeding one-term United Russia incumbent Anatoly Litovchenko. Gartung has been chairing the Duma Committee on Protection of Competition since its creation in October 2021.

== Boundaries ==
1993–2007 Sovetsky constituency: Chelyabinsk (Leninsky, Sovetsky), Kopeysk, Korkino, Sosnovsky District, Uvelsky District, Yemanzhelinsk, Yetkulsky District, Yuzhnouralsk
The constituency covered southern Chelyabinsk and most of its suburbs, including Kopeysk, Korkino and Yemanzhelinsk.

2016–present: Chelyabinsk (Leninsky, Sovetsky), Kopeysk, Korkinsky District, Oktyabrsky District, Uvelsky District, Yemanzhelinsky District, Yetkulsky District, Yuzhnouralsk
The constituency was re-created for the 2016 election under the name "Korkino constituency" and retained most of its former territory, losing suburban Sosnovsky District to Chelyabinsk constituency. This seat instead gained Oktyabrsky District in eastern Chelyabinsk Oblast from Zlatoust constituency.

== Members elected ==
Election	Member	Party
1993	Vladimir Utkin (Note: appointed Chairman of the Government of Chelyabinsk Oblast in February 1997)	Civic Union
1995	Vladimir Utkin	Congress of Russian Communities
1997	Valery Gartung	Independent
1999	Valery Gartung	Independent
2003	Valery Gartung	Independent
2007	Proportional representation - no election by constituency	
2011	Proportional representation - no election by constituency	
2016	Anatoly Litovchenko	United Russia
2021	Valery Gartung	A Just Russia
2026	Valery Gartung	A Just Russia

== Election results ==
=== 1993 ===
Summary of the 12 December 1993 Russian legislative election in the Sovetsky constituency
Candidate	Party	Votes	%
Vladimir Utkin	Civic Union	107,911	39.32%
Larisa Subbotina	Independent	66,743	24.32%
Pavel Moderau	Russian Democratic Reform Movement	23,410	8.53%
Aleksandr Popov	Yavlinsky–Boldyrev–Lukin	18,334	6.68%
Aleksandr Tomilov	Independent	13,410	4.89%
Total		274,446	100%

=== 1995 ===
Summary of the 17 December 1995 Russian legislative election in the Sovetsky constituency
Candidate	Party	Votes	%
Vladimir Utkin (incumbent)	Congress of Russian Communities	133,730	39.04%
Aleksandr Kuznetsov	Yabloko	34,249	10.00%
Fyodor Klyuyev	Our Home – Russia	33,679	9.83%
Lyubov Patrakova	Party of Workers' Self-Government	23,115	6.75%
Vladimir Gruzdev	Liberal Democratic Party	19,596	5.72%
Andrey Belishko	Ivan Rybkin Bloc	18,411	5.37%
Igor Belekhov	Independent	16,798	4.90%
Aleksandr Vorobyev	Democratic Choice of Russia – United Democrats	16,766	4.89%
Vasily Kubashov	Revival	4,791	1.40%
against all		32,996	9.63%
Total		342,551	100%

=== 1997 June ===
After Vladimir Utkin was appointed Chairman of the Government of Chelyabinsk Oblast in February 1997 he had to give up his seat in the State Duma. A by-election was scheduled for 29 June 1997 with the concurrent by-election in the Kyshtym constituency. The by-election in Sovetsky constituency was won by Valery Gartung, however, the results were annulled due to low turnout (21.80%) and another election was scheduled for 14 December 1997.

Summary of the 29 June 1997 by-election in the Sovetsky constituency
Candidate	Party	Votes	%
Valery Gartung	Independent	–	–
Sergey Grekov	Independent	–	–
Vladimir Gruzdev	Independent	–	–
Yury Merezhko	Independent	–	–
Sergey Natarov	Independent	–	–
Lyubov Patrakova	Independent	–	–
Vitaly Pautov	Independent	–	–
Aleksandr Sumin	Independent	–	–
against all		–	–
Total		–	100%

=== 1997 December ===
Summary of the 14 December 1997 by-election in the Sovetsky constituency
Candidate	Party	Votes	%
Valery Gartung	Independent	71,852	43.41%
Yury Gorbunov	Independent	57,038	34.46%
Vitaly Pautov	Independent	9,222	5.57%
Lyubov Patrakova	Independent	4,825	2.91%
Vladimir Gruzdev	Independent	2,779	1.68%
Yelena Mavrodi	Independent	1,670	1.01%
against all		13,140	7.94%
Total		165,531	100%
Eligible voters/turnout		540,215	30.64%

=== 1999 ===
Summary of the 19 December 1999 Russian legislative election in the Sovetsky constituency
Candidate	Party	Votes	%
Valery Gartung (incumbent)	Independent	124,603	37.02%
Aleksandr Aristov	Independent	116,615	34.65%
Ivan Shchedrin	Communist Party	32,173	9.56%
Rafail Shafigulin	Independent	14,685	4.36%
Yury Rudakov	Independent	5,224	1.55%
Sergey Kazimirov	Independent	3,412	1.01%
Sergey Shutyuk	Independent	2,828	0.84%
Mikhail Kotelnikov	Liberal Democratic Party	2,599	0.77%
Gennady Pskov	Independent	1,662	0.49%
Vladimir Bukhdruker	Independent	1,190	0.35%
against all		25,931	7.70%
Total		336,590	100%

=== 2003 ===
Summary of the 7 December 2003 Russian legislative election in the Sovetsky constituency
Candidate	Party	Votes	%
Valery Gartung (incumbent)	Independent	192,867	68.50%
Stanislav Poptsov	Communist Party	18,956	6.73%
Mikhail Kotelnikov	Liberal Democratic Party	10,853	3.85%
Aleksey Tabalov	Yabloko	10,833	3.85%
Viktor Pinzhenin	Russian Communist Workers Party–Russian Party of Communists	4,590	1.63%
Oleg Kurichev	Agrarian Party	4,001	1.42%
Mikhail Akhromenko	Independent	2,366	0.84%
against all		32,662	11.60%
Total		281,964	100%

=== 2016 ===
Summary of the 18 September 2016 Russian legislative election in the Korkino constituency
Candidate	Party	Votes	%
Anatoly Litovchenko	United Russia	89,652	37.73%
Valery Gartung	A Just Russia	81,997	34.51%
Sergey Shargunov	Communist Party	18,754	7.89%
Andrey Samokhvalov	Liberal Democratic Party	17,928	7.54%
Nikolay Yarovoy	Communists of Russia	6,571	2.77%
Valeria Prikhodkina	People's Freedom Party	4,582	1.93%
Yaroslav Shcherbakov	Yabloko	4,581	1.93%
Dmitry Gorbachyov	Party of Growth	3,113	1.31%
Konstantin Gritsenko	Patriots of Russia	1,881	0.79%
Total		237,627	100%

=== 2021 ===
Summary of the 17-19 September 2021 Russian legislative election in the Korkino constituency
Candidate	Party	Votes	%
Valery Gartung	A Just Russia — For Truth	101,668	46.78%
Anton Ryzhy	United Russia	36,778	16.92%
Stepanida Smirnova	Communist Party	22,949	10.56%
Igor Vazhenin	New People	13,667	6.29%
Aleksey Besedin	Liberal Democratic Party	8,959	4.12%
Igor Roslyakov	Party of Pensioners	7,347	3.38%
Natalya Tavrina	Yabloko	4,409	2.03%
Sergey Krylov	Rodina	3,425	1.58%
Vladislav Dolgov	Russian Party of Freedom and Justice	3,399	1.56%
Yevgeny Yevseyev	Party of Growth	2,850	1.31%
Anastasia Nikonova	Civic Platform	2,516	1.16%
Total		217,315	100%

=== 2026 ===
Summary of the 18-20 September 2026 Russian legislative election in the Korkino constituency
Candidate	Party	Votes	%
Valery Gartung (incumbent)	A Just Russia	123,960	48.00%
Anton Ryzhy	United Russia	60,212	23.31%
Polina Krepak	New People	21,761	8.43%
Konstantin Natsiyevsky	Communist Party	20,598	7.98%
Aleksey Suvorin	Liberal Democratic Party	13,207	5.11%
Stepan Firstov	Party of Pensioners	7,960	3.08%
Vladimir Gertye	The Greens	3,370	1.30%
Total		258,264	100%
