= Timeline of the COVID-19 pandemic in Russia (July–December 2020) =

Sequence of major events in ongoing COVID-19 viral pandemic in Russia

The following is the timeline of the COVID-19 pandemic in Russia for the second half of 2020.

== Timeline ==
=== July 2020 ===
On 1 July, 6,556 new cases were confirmed, bringing the total number to 654,405. Confirmed deaths rose to 9,536. Melita Vujnovich, the World Health Organization representative in Russia, said that the country has taken a "good path" in recent weeks, leading to infection numbers to fall. She also said that the system for the vote on constitutional amendments that day was well thought out by the authorities.

On 2 July, 6,760 new cases were confirmed, bringing the total number to 661,165. Confirmed deaths rose to 9,683. In Moscow, the number of new infections confirmed in the last day was 611 - the lowest since 6 April.

On 3 July, 6,718 new cases were confirmed, bringing the total number to 667,883 . Confirmed deaths rose to 9,859.

On 4 July, 6,632 new cases were confirmed, bringing the total number to 674,515. Confirmed deaths rose to 10,027. It was reported that cinemas in Moscow could reopen on 1 August, however there wasn't a final decision. This was according to the head of the Russian Association of Theatre Owners, Oleg Berezin. Previously, a date of 15 July was estimated. Rospotrebnadzor also published sanitary rules for schools, kindergartens and camps until the end of 2020.

On 5 July, 6,736 new cases were confirmed, bringing the total number to 681,251. Confirmed deaths rose to 10,161. The government also allocated almost 7.5 billion rubles in payments to health workers treating coronavirus patients. The Federal Tourism Agency also said that subsidies would be given to small hotels to purchase personal protective equipment.

On 6 July, 6,611 new cases were confirmed, bringing the total number to 687,862. Confirmed deaths rose to 10,296. It was reported that the temporary hospitals in Patriot Park and Crocus Expo located in Moscow Oblast would start being dismantled due to the significant decrease in new infections. The governor of Murmansk Oblast, Andrey Chibis, denied plans of an entry ban to the region, calling it "fake news".

On 7 July, 6,368 new cases were confirmed, bringing the total number to 694,230. Confirmed deaths rose to 10,494. The Communications Ministry said that the system for tracking infected persons would not involve the processing of personal data.

On 8 July, 6,562 new cases were confirmed, bringing the total number to 700,792. Confirmed deaths rose to 10,667. The governor of Moscow Oblast, Andrey Vorobyov, signed a decree easing some restrictions in the region including allowing restaurants, cafes, bars and other catering establishments to reopen from 25 July as well as a number of other places to reopen from 15 July. The President's Special Representative for International Cultural Cooperation, Mikhail Shvydkoy, said that theatres would be allowed to reopen in Moscow from 1 August with the number of viewers limited to 50%.

On 9 July, 6,509 new cases were confirmed, bringing the total number to 707,301. Confirmed deaths rose to 10,843. Moscow's authorities announced further easing of some restrictions with cinemas allowed to reopen and concerts allowed to be held from 1 August provided that they meet certain requirements. Attractions would be able to reopen and restrictions on places like parks and cultural centres would be removed on 13 July. In Krasnoyarsk Krai, restrictions on enterprises and organisations were extended to 9 August.

On 10 July, 6,635 new cases were confirmed, bringing the total number to 713,936. Confirmed deaths rose to 11,017. Rosstat published data which said that COVID-19 was confirmed or assumed to be the main cause of death for 7,444 people who died in May, with an additional 5,008 people with a COVID-19 diagnosis determined to have died from other diseases. The death toll reported by the coronavirus crisis centre for May was 3,633. Tatyana Golikova said that starting on 15 July, authorities will start to gradually lift restrictions on flights abroad and will begin negotiations to restart international flights.

On 11 July, 6,611 new cases were confirmed, bringing the total number to 720,547. Confirmed deaths rose to 11,205. The head of Rospotrebnadzor, Anna Popova, said that a special vaccine for children has started development.

On 12 July, 6,615 new cases were confirmed, bringing the total number to 727,162. Confirmed deaths rose to 11,335. It was reported that Sechenov University had completed testing of a vaccine developed by the Gamaleya Centre on volunteers and that scientists had confirmed its safety.

On 13 July, 6,537 new cases were confirmed, bringing the total number to 733,699. Confirmed deaths rose to 11,439. In Moscow, a new stage in the lifting of restrictions started. Universities, colleges and schools were allowed to resume to normal and the use of face masks and gloves outdoors is no longer required except in public transport, shops and crowded places, with social distancing requirements continuing. The Ministry of Culture also lifted the ban on cinemas, with regional authorities now choosing whether to let them reopen. The Ministry of Defence also stated that no participants in the Victory Day parade in Moscow were infected.

On 14 July, 6,248 new cases were confirmed, bringing the total number to 739,947. Confirmed deaths rose to 11,614. The Russian Direct Investment Fund (RDIF) said that Russia and its international partners would produce over 200 million doses of the vaccine by the end of 2020. The head of the Belarusian government said that transport links with Russia would resume in the coming days.

On 15 July, 6,422 new cases were confirmed, bringing the total number to 746,369. Confirmed deaths rose to 11,770. The 14-day quarantine requirement for arrivals in the country was abolished with arrivals now requiring medical documents in English or Russian showing a negative test. If an arrival does not have such documents, they will be placed into observation until they get a negative test result. Tatyana Golikova previously said that quarantines can be maintained for Russians returning from countries with high infection rates. It was also announced that residents of Moscow would be able to take a PCR test for free from 16 July.

On 16 July, 6,428 new cases were confirmed, bringing the total number to 752,797. Confirmed deaths rose to 11,937. Reuters reported that 30 million doses of the experimental vaccine would be produced domestically in Russia and the potential for 170 million to be manufactured abroad, according to the head of RDIF, Kirill Dmitriev. He also said that a Phase III trial involving several thousand people is expected to start in August. The head of the RDIF dismissed British accusations that Russian hackers backed by the security services attempted to steal coronavirus vaccine research. He said that there was no need because AstraZeneca had negotiated a deal in the production of the Oxford vaccine in Russia and called the accusations an attempt of "tarnish the reputation" of the Russian vaccine.

On 17 July, 6,406 new cases were confirmed, bringing the total number to 759,203. Confirmed deaths rose to 12,123. The head of the Rospotrebnadzor department in Khabarovsk Krai recommended a return of restrictions following protests in the region due to increased reported infections. The Governor of Moscow Oblast announced the transition to the third stage of lifting restrictions. Reuters reported that the economy shrank by 9.6% year-on-year in the 2nd quarter, the most in 20 years, according to the economy minister. Real disposable incomes fell by 8% in year-on-year terms in April to June according to Rosstat. It also said that Russia's industrial output fell by 9.4% in June compared to a year ago.

On 18 July, 6,234 new cases were confirmed, bringing the total number to 765,437. Confirmed deaths rose to 12,247. Moscow's mayor, Sobyanin, said that City Day celebrations would take place on time if the epidemiological situation does not worsen.

On 19 July, 6,109 new cases were confirmed, bringing the total number to 771,546. Confirmed deaths rose to 12,342. The authorities of Yamalo-Nenets Autonomous Okrug extended the self-isolation regime until 15 August, with all residents required to wear masks and following social distancing in public places and transport.

On 20 July, 5,940 new cases were confirmed, bringing the total number to 777,486. Confirmed deaths rose to 12,427. The Ministry of Defence said that it completed the first clinical trials of a vaccine on human volunteers. The necessary antibodies were detected and the components of the vaccine are safe and tolerated well by humans, said a lead military scientist. Organisers for the "Immortal Regiment" march postponed the event to 9 May 2021. President Putin stated that the Victory Day parade and the vote on constitutional amendments that were held did not cause further outbreaks.

On 21 July, 5,842 new cases were confirmed, bringing the total number to 783,328. Confirmed deaths rose to 12,580. It was reported that the Finance Ministry had proposed the government to cut spending on the military by 5% between 2021 and 2023. The proposal also included a spending cut of 10% on the court system and the servicing of debt and wages for civil servants.

On 22 July, 5,862 new cases were confirmed, bringing the total number to 789,190. Confirmed deaths rose to 12,745. Prime Minister Mishustin said that 4 vaccines being developed in Russia have already proven their safety and that he hopes a reliable vaccine will be available by autumn. Dmitry Degtyarev, a minister of Sverdlovsk Oblast, was reported to have died from the virus. 18,484 people in the region are confirmed to have been infected. The Economy Minister, Maxim Reshetnikov, was quoted as saying that Russia's GDP declined by 4.2% in the first half of 2020. He said that this ministry was maintaining its 2020 forecast of a decrease of 4.8%, but that it would be revised in August.

On 23 July, 5,848 new cases were confirmed, bringing the total number to 795,038. Confirmed deaths rose to 12,892. The press service of AliExpress Russia said that the demand for game consoles and accessories in Russia quadrupled in the 2nd quarter of the year. The Health Minister, Mikhail Murashko, said that the vaccination of doctors may begin in August.

On 24 July, 5,811 new cases were confirmed, bringing the total number to 800,849. Confirmed deaths rose to 13,046. The Speaker of the Federation Council, Valentina Matvienko, said that two members were infected with the virus and as a result, were absent at a session, with one in serious condition in hospital. She urged members to comply with the sanitary and epidemiological requirements. St. Petersburg's authorities agreed with business representatives on conditions for a new stage in the easing of restrictions beginning on 27 July allowing for restaurants and shopping centres to reopen. The acting governor of Khabarovsk Krai, Mikhail Degtyarev, allowed a tightening of restrictions following an increase in reported infections. Tatyana Golikova said that the country plans to resume some international flights on 1 August, with the list of destinations currently limited to Tanzania, Turkey and the United Kingdom. This would include airports in Moscow, St. Petersburg and Rostov-on-Don to and from the island of Zanzibar, London, Istanbul and Ankara. She said that more destinations in Turkey would be added from 10 August. She also said that a list of more countries was being worked on by authorities on a mutual basis.

On 25 July, 5,871 new cases were confirmed, bringing the total number to 806,720. Confirmed deaths rose to 13,192.

On 26 July, 5,765 new cases were confirmed, bringing the total number to 812,485. Confirmed deaths rose to 13,269. The Health Minister, Mikhail Murashko, confirmed again that vaccinations against the virus would be voluntary and that the vaccination of the population will be done in stages, first to health workers.

On 27 July, 5,635 new cases were confirmed, bringing the total number to 818,120. Confirmed deaths rose to 13,354.

On 28 July, 5,395 new cases were confirmed, bringing the total number to 823,515. Confirmed deaths rose to 13,504. The news agency TASS reported that the European Union would not open its borders with Russia until at least mid-August. Its source said that it was "too early" according to statistics, with the EU's "white list" currently containing 13 countries. The State Research Center of Virology and Biotechnology VECTOR began clinical trials on volunteers of a vaccine. The governor of Chukotka Autonomous Okrug, Roman Kopin was hospitalised with a suspected COVID-19 infection.

On 29 July, 5,475 new cases were confirmed, bringing the total number to 828,990. Confirmed deaths rose to 13,673. Interfax reported that a vaccine by the Gamaleya Centre is likely to be registered from 10 to 12 August and the vaccine could be administered to civilians from 15 August.

On 30 July, 5,509 new cases were confirmed, bringing the total number to 834,499. Confirmed deaths rose to 13,802.

On 31 July, 5,482 new cases were confirmed, bringing the total number to 839,981. Confirmed deaths rose to 13,963. TASS reported that over 6,000 enterprises in Moscow received fines totalling 300 million rubles for violating face mask and glove requirements.

=== August 2020 ===
On 1 August, 5,462 new cases were confirmed, bringing the total number to 845,443. Confirmed deaths rose to 14,058. Abkhazia opened its border with Russia and lifted all restrictions, following Prime Minister Mishustin's signing of an order to open its border with Abkhazia on 1 August. The Minister of Health, Murashko, said that the vaccinations are planned to be covered by the budget. Mass vaccinations are planned to begin in October, first to health workers and teachers. It was also reported that flights with Switzerland would resume on 15 August - flights would be operated once a week between Moscow and Geneva.

On 2 August, 5,427 new cases were confirmed, bringing the total number to 850,870. Confirmed deaths rose to 14,128. The director of the VECTOR Institute, Rinat Maksyutov, said that production of its vaccine is expected to start in November, with medical workers to be vaccinated first. The head of Rospotrebnadzor, Anna Popova, said that the incidence of infections were stabilising or decreasing in 80 of the 85 federal subjects.

On 3 August, 5,394 new cases were confirmed, bringing the total number to 856,264. Confirmed deaths rose to 14,207. The Trade Minister, Denis Manturov, said that by the start of 2021, several million doses per month of a COVID-19 vaccine will be able to be produced by the Russian pharmaceutical industry. He also said that the production of the vaccine by the Gamaleya Centre should start in September. The head of the RDIF said that by the end of the year, 10 million doses per month would be produced by the country. The governor of Sverdlovsk Oblast extended the self-isolation regime for residents over 65 years old to 10 August. RBC reported that over 15% of catering establishments in Russia did not reopen. The RDIF announced start if deliveries of the coronavirus drug, Avifavir, to South Africa and 7 Latin American countries. The head of RDIF said that 15 countries already have been supplied with the drug.

On 4 August, 5,159 new cases were confirmed, bringing the total number to 861,423. Confirmed deaths rose to 14,351. The head of the Federal Tourism Agency, Zarina Doguzova, said that total losses for the tourism industry amounted to about 1.5 trillion rubles, with losses from the closure of the borders amounting to around 500 billion rubles.

On 5 August, 5,204 new cases were confirmed, bringing the total number to 866,627. Confirmed deaths rose to 14,490. The head of Kalmykia, Batu Khasikov, announced that he tested positive for the virus. Prime Minister Mishustin lifted restrictions on railway links with Kaliningrad and other cities. It was originally suspended on 6 April and in July, trains were restarted from Moscow and St. Petersburg only for those with permanent resident permits in Kaliningrad Oblast. Moscow's culture department was reported to have issued an order banning those with a temperature higher than 37 °C or other symptoms of illness from entering theatres and attending concerts.

On 6 August, 5,267 new cases were confirmed, bringing the total number to 871,894. Confirmed deaths rose to 14,606. Prime Minister Mishustin said that over 9 billion rubles would be allocated to premiums in 76 regions for doctors treating patients with the virus or suspected of having been infected. The governor of St. Petersburg, Alexander Beglov, signed a decree easing restrictions - from 8 August, the ban on holding sports, cultural and entertainment events outside would be lifted and open-air amusement parks would reopen, however the use of face masks and social distancing requirements would still be required. In Rostov Oblast, catering establishments would be allowed to reopen from 10 August. The resumption of railway links between Abkhazia and Russia was reported to begin on 7 August.

On 7 August, 5,241 new cases were confirmed, bringing the total number to 877,135. Confirmed deaths rose to 14,725. Rosstat published mortality data for June which included 11,917 deaths for people with COVID-19. Chelyabinsk Oblast extended restrictions until 23 August. The Ministry of Health said that the registration of the vaccine was planned on 12 August, with the third phase of testing now underway.

On 8 August, 5,212 new cases were confirmed, bringing the total number to 882,347. Confirmed deaths rose to 14,854. The government of Ukraine said that it would close its border with Crimea from 9 August to 30 August, with only Crimean residents with Ukrainian citizenship being allowed to enter Crimea.

On 9 August, 5,189 new cases were confirmed, bringing the total number to 887,536. Confirmed deaths rose to 14,931.

On 10 August, 5,118 new cases were confirmed, bringing the total number to 892,654. Confirmed deaths rose to 15,001.

On 11 August, 4,945 new cases were confirmed, bringing the total number to 897,599. Confirmed deaths rose to 15,131. President Putin said in a meeting that the first vaccine in the world against the coronavirus, developed by the Gamaleya Research Institute of Epidemiology and Microbiology, was registered in Russia and that one of his daughters was vaccinated. The previous day, the Association of Clinical Research Organisations, a union of pharmaceutical companies in Russia, urged the head of the Ministry of Health to delay the registration due to incomplete testing. The head of the RDIF stated that 20 countries had requested in total 1 billion doses of the vaccine, named Sputnik V.

On 12 August, 5,102 new cases were confirmed, bringing the total number to 902,701. Confirmed deaths rose to 15,260. The head of the Ministry of Health, Murashko, said that the first batches of the vaccine would be released within two weeks and delivered for the vaccination of high-risk medics who would be monitored. The World Health Organization said it was in contact with Russian scientists and authorities for the opportunity to analyse data of vaccine trials, RBC reported.

On 13 August, 5,057 new cases were confirmed, bringing the total number to 907,758. Confirmed deaths rose to 15,384. Moscow's mayor, Sobyanin, denied reports that restrictions would be re-introduced in September.

On 14 August, 5,065 new cases were confirmed, bringing the total number to 912,823. Confirmed deaths rose to 15,498. A survey by the "Doctor's Handbook" found that the majority of doctors interviewed (52%) said they were not ready to receive the vaccine developed by the Gamaleya Centre while 24.5% were, with most saying that there was not enough data for the effectiveness of the vaccine.

On 15 August, 5,061 new cases were confirmed, bringing the total number to 917,884. Confirmed deaths rose to 15,617. The first batch of the vaccine developed by the Gamaleya Centre was produced in Russia, according to the Ministry of Health's press service.

On 16 August, 4,969 new cases were confirmed, bringing the total number to 922,853. Confirmed deaths rose to 15,685.

On 17 August, 4,892 new cases were confirmed, bringing the total number to 927,745. Confirmed deaths rose to 15,740. Mexico's president, Andrés Manuel López Obrador said that he would volunteer to test a Russian vaccine if it proved to be effective. In Sverdlovsk Oblast, a number of restrictions were eased with all catering establishments being allowed to reopen (which were previously closed on 28 March) as well as places like recreation centres.

On 18 August, 4,748 new cases were confirmed, bringing the total number to 932,493. Confirmed deaths rose to 15,872. The Energy Minister, Alexander Novak, was reported to have been infected with the virus. The authorities of Krasnodar Krai extended the high-alert regime until 3 September.

On 19 August, 4,828 new cases were confirmed, bringing the total number to 937,321. Confirmed deaths rose to 15,989.

On 20 August, 4,785 new cases were confirmed, bringing the total number to 942,106. Confirmed deaths rose to 16,099. TASS reported that mass testing of the vaccine developed by the Gamaleya Centre would involve more than 40,000 people. The Deputy Prime Minister for Construction, Housing and Utilities and Regional Development Marat Khusnullin had announced that he was vaccinated with the vaccine developed by the Gamaleya Centre.

On 21 August, 4,870 new cases were confirmed, bringing the total number to 946,976. Confirmed deaths rose to 16,199. It was reported that Mexico would receive at least 2,000 doses of the vaccine developed by the Gamaleya Centre as part of clinical trials in the third phase. A clinical trial of the vaccine developed by the VECTOR Institute is due to be completed in September, it was reported.

On 22 August, 4,921 new cases were confirmed, bringing the total number to 951,897. Confirmed deaths rose to 16,310.

On 23 August, 4,852 new cases were confirmed, bringing the total number to 956,749. Confirmed deaths rose to 16,383.

On 24 August, 4,744 new cases were confirmed, bringing the total number to 961,493. Confirmed deaths rose to 16,448.

On 25 August, 4,696 new cases were confirmed, bringing the total number to 966,189. Confirmed deaths rose to 16,568. It was reported that Cyprus would allow certain Russian nationals (those who permanently reside there and their families, those with a residence permit or entry permit from Cypriot authorities as well as diplomats) to enter the country after its health ministry updated its assessment of the epidemiological situation in other countries. It was also reported that President Putin instructed the government to allocate funds from the budget to medical organisations for the costs of combating the virus. The website Znak reported that Moscow's mayor, Sobyanin, had been vaccinated with the vaccine developed by the Gamaleya Centre, according to two sources close to him. His press secretary said that she had "no such information".

On 26 August, 4,676 new cases were confirmed, bringing the total number to 970,865. Confirmed deaths rose to 16,683. It was reported that the head of the Tuvan Republic, Sholban Kara-ool, was thought to have been reinfected with the virus twice in what may have been the first case of reinfection in Russia.

On 27 August, 4,711 new cases were confirmed, bringing the total number to 975,576. Confirmed deaths rose to 16,804. Sverdlovsk Oblast's governor, Yevgeny Kuyvashev, said that cinemas, theatres and concert arenas would be allowed to reopen in the region on 9 September, with restrictions including a maximum attendance of 50% the number of seats. Sanitisers would also be installed and temperatures of attendees would be measured at the entrance.

On 28 August, 4,829 new cases were confirmed, bringing the total number to 980,405. Confirmed deaths rose to 16,914. The science and education minister, Valery Falkov, said that Russian universities were organising distance learning for foreign students who are unable to attend due to closed borders. Falkov had previously said that most classes would begin on 1 September and be subject to sanitary measures. The deputy prime minister Tatiana Golikova also previously said that higher education institutions would be able to postpone the start of the academic year by a maximum of two months, with 92% of universities starting normally.

On 29 August, 4,941 new cases were confirmed, bringing the total number to 985,346. Confirmed deaths rose to 17,025. The government website stated that additional funds allocated to the Ministry of Health and Federal Biomedical Agency was approved for payments to doctors. According to a letter by Rospotrebnadzor head, Anna Popova, foreign students may be allowed to enter the country to study at universities, provided that they have a medical document confirming a negative test and received it no more than 3 days before their arrival. President Putin on state TV said that the next academic year would begin on 1 September and called for the compliance with health guidelines and safety requirements. He confirmed that there would be face-to-face teaching but noted a "flexible" approach to this.

On 30 August, 4,980 new cases were confirmed, bringing the total number to 990,326. Confirmed deaths rose to 17,093. Moscow's mayor, Sobyanin, said that no mass celebrations or events were planned for City Day, saying that the holiday would be "calm, homely... in parks, squares, at festival grounds". The education ministry said that teachers would not be required to be vaccinated.

On 31 August, 4,993 new cases were confirmed, bringing the total number to 995,319. Confirmed deaths rose to 17,176. The science and education ministry said that rules and requirements for student dormitories were placed. The head of Rospotrebnadzor confirmed the beginning of the academic year the next day on a full-time basis, saying the current epidemiological situation makes it possible to do so. The health ministry had also previously gave recommendations for parents for the next school year. The industry and trade minister, Denis Manturov, said that the company BIOCAD will become the manufacturer of a second Russian vaccine developed by the VECTOR institute. The health minister, Marushko, said that large batches of the vaccine would start being supplied in September, with maximum volumes by November and December.

=== September 2020 ===
On 1 September, 4,729 new cases were confirmed, bringing the total number to 1,000,048. The director of the Gamaleya Centre said that a stage 3 test for its vaccine would begin in Moscow, consisting of 40,000 volunteers with clinics receiving the vaccine from 3–4 September.

On 2 September, 4,952 new cases were confirmed, bringing the total number to 1,005,000. Confirmed deaths rose to 17,414. The director of the Gamaleya Centre said that trials for stage 3 testing would be planned on volunteers over 60 years of age. The health ministry said earlier that the vaccine is not yet recommend for those over 60 and under 18 years of age. The trade and industry minister, Denis Manturov, was vaccinated against the virus using the vaccine developed by the Gamaleya Centre and described his experience. The leader of the Liberal Democratic Party of Russia, Vladimir Zhirinovsky, was reported to have been vaccinated after volunteering.

On 3 September, 4,995 new cases were confirmed, bringing the total number to 1,009,995. Confirmed deaths rose to 17,528. Moscow's mayor, Sobyanin, signed a decree to allow exhibitions and congresses to resume.

On 4 September, 5,100 new cases were confirmed, bringing the total number to 1,015,105. Confirmed deaths rose to 17,649. It was reported that vice mayors of Moscow, Anastasia Rakova and Vladimir Efimov, were vaccinated, where nearly all heads of departments were vaccinated after Sobyanin was vaccinated. Sobyanin had also discussed his vaccination with President Putin in a videoconference. Flights to Egypt, the Maldives and the United Arab Emirates was added to the list of countries where flights are planned to be resumed.

On 5 September, 5,205 new cases were confirmed, bringing the total number to 1,020,310. Confirmed deaths rose to 17,759. Defense Minister Sergey Shoygu reported his condition on state TV after being vaccinated. Numerous other government officials and local officials were reported to have been vaccinated or discussed their experience in recent weeks. Sobyanin stated that journalists, health workers, education workers and law enforcement may be among the first to be able to get vaccinated, saying that "serious mass vaccination" would happen at the end of the year and beginning of the next year.

On 6 September, 5,195 new cases were confirmed, bringing the total number to 1,025,505. Confirmed deaths rose to 17,820. First Deputy Minister of Education Dmitry Glushko said that several schools were forced to switch to remote learning immediately after the start of the school year due to outbreaks. He also said that parents were given the right to choose the format of education for their children.

On 7 September, 5,185 new cases were confirmed, bringing the total number to 1,030,690. Confirmed deaths rose to 17,871. The head of Roszdravnadzor, Alla Samoilova, said that there were inaccuracies in mortality statistics, with discrepancies in the data for hospitals that were designated to treat coronavirus patients, where some had coded the cause of death differently leading to cases where there were hospitals that recorded almost all deaths as caused by COVID-19 or almost all deaths were ascribed to other causes.

On 8 September, 5,099 new cases were confirmed, bringing the total number to 1,035,789. Confirmed deaths rose to 17,993. The health ministry's press service said that the first batches of the vaccine developed by the Gamaleya Centre had entered civilian circulation. Professor Alexander Butenko of the Gamaleya Centre said that there would be two versions of the vaccine: one for adults and one for children. He said that the dosage for children would be reduced.

On 9 September, 5,218 new cases were confirmed, bringing the total number to 1,041,007. Confirmed deaths rose to 18,135. Authorities said that the final trials of the vaccine developed by the Gamaleya Centre had begun. Health Minister Mikhail Murashko said that 31,000 out of the announced 40,000 volunteers had been recruited for the study. Deputy Moscow Mayor Anastasia Rakova said that over 35,000 Muscovites applied to take part in the trials.

On 10 September, 5,363 new cases were confirmed, bringing the total number to 1,046,370. Confirmed deaths rose to 18,263. Anastasia Rakova said that Moscow authorities will not require anymore a two-week home quarantine period for people with symptoms of acute respiratory infection if they test negative for the coronavirus. They are required to take a test though. The Bolshoi Theatre cancelled its show of Don Carlos as a soloist was infected with the virus.

On 11 September, 5,504 new cases were confirmed, bringing the total number to 1,051,874. Confirmed deaths rose to 18,365. RBC cited a survey that said that 45.6% of Russian respondents would never get a vaccination against the coronavirus, regardless if the vaccine is domestic or foreign. This figure increased by almost 8% compared to the previous month. Only 13.2% would choose to get vaccinated as soon as it is possible, and 18.6% plan to wait until next year to decide.

On 12 September, 5,488 new cases were confirmed, bringing the total number to 1,057,362. Confirmed deaths rose to 18,484.

On 13 September, 5,449 new cases were confirmed, bringing the total number to 1,062,811. Confirmed deaths rose to 18,578. Regional elections in Russia were held, with social distancing measures and sanitary requirements for polling stations. Voting was also extended to three days, taking place from 11 September to 13 September, with the main voting day on the last day, as well as other changes.

On 14 September, 5,509 new cases were confirmed, bringing the total number to 1,068,320. Confirmed deaths rose to 18,635. Prime Minister Mishustin signed a decree to extend incentive payments to medical workers for another month. Moscow's mayor, Sobyanin, said that the authorities are confident that the situation is stable in Moscow and that additional restrictions and measures would not be required for the time being. TASS reported that the first batch of the vaccine by the Vector Institute may be released in November. It was reported that health officials proposed to deprive medical workers of incentive payments if they refused to get vaccinated.

On 15 September, 5,529 new cases were confirmed, bringing the total number to 1,073,849. Confirmed deaths rose to 18,785. The head of Rospotrebnadzor Anna Popova said that 26 vaccines in 17 scientific organisations against the coronavirus were being developed in Russia. State Duma Speaker Vyacheslav Volodin said that some deputies had signed up to volunteer for vaccination.

On 16 September, RDIF said in a press release that it would be cooperating with Dr. Reddy's Laboratories in carrying out clinical trials and to supply 100 million doses of the Sputnik V vaccine in India once final trials and regulatory steps are completed, with deliveries expected to begin at the end of 2020. The government approved an increase in the tax of extracting metals and minerals by 3.5 times which is expected by the finance ministry to increase the budget by 56 billion rubles in 2021, however industry associations and unions as well as the Russian Union of Industrialists and Entrepreneurs criticised the measure.

On 17 September, RBC reported that pharmacies in Russia would begin selling Coronavir and Areplivir for treatment of the virus.

On 18 September, it was reported that the mayor of the town Plast and head of the Plastovsky District in Chelyabinsk Oblast, Aleksandr Neklyudov, had died from the virus. It was reported that the health ministry would include the drug Favipiravir, which was approved for treatment of the virus, in the list of essential drugs (Russian: жизненно необходимых важнейших лекарственных препаратов (ЖНВЛП)) which regulates maximum prices.

On 19 September, Bashkortostan's authorities introduced a special procedure for the movement of persons and vehicles in the republic. In two cities and five districts, non-residents would not be allowed to stop there with exceptions including work, emergencies or the movement of emergency services. Local residents would be able to move around with the use of special passes. The governor of Saratov Oblast, Valery Radaev, announced that he was infected with the virus and would work in self-isolation. Other regional heads who were previously infected included Alexander Brechalov, Batu Khasikov, Dmitry Makhonin and Dmitry Artyukhov.

On 20 September, Prime Minister Mishustin signed a decree resuming flights with 4 countries. Flights with Belarus, Kazakhstan and Kyrgyzstan would resume on 21 September while flights with South Korea would resume on 27 September. Other countries where flights have been resumed include Egypt, the Maldives, Tanzania, Turkey, Switzerland, the UAE and the UK. It was reported that the first group of Russian volunteers for a Chinese vaccine, Ad5-nCoV, received the vaccine, with no side effects reported.

On 22 September, it was reported that the governor of Altai Krai, Viktor Tomenko, was infected with the virus and as a result has moved to working remotely. Moreover, the head of Adygea, Murat Kumpilov, confirmed that he was infected with the virus and was now working remotely. The health ministry authorised clinical trials of a vaccine developed by the Chumakov Federal Scientific Centre for Research. The State Duma's speaker, Vyacheslav Volodin, said that ten deputies were hospitalised and being treated for the virus. The head of RFID, Kirill Dmitriev, said to Reuters that said that "Russia is so confident" in the Sputnik V vaccine that it would share legal liability for unexpected side effects. He said that a major differentiating factor with the Western vaccines was that "all of them are asking for full indemnity of legal risks."

On 23 September, Rospotrebnadzor head, Anna Popova, signed a decree which requires Russian citizens who have returned from abroad by plane to stay home until they receive a negative test result. It was reported that a State Duma deputy from the Communist Party, Vakha Agaev, had died from the virus, becoming the first victim among State Duma members. President Putin announced the imminent registration of a second Russian vaccine against the virus.

On 24 September, Sberbank's press service said that half of its employees were moved to working remotely following a request by Moscow authorities. Moscow's mayor, Sobyanin, said that the situation in Moscow was getting more complicated with a "serious increase in hospitalisations". It was also reported that he had written to the heads of large companies including Rostec, Sberbank and Yandex to request more of their employees to be switched to working remotely.

On 25 September, Moscow's mayor, Sobyanin, published an appeal to employers in the city to transfer as many employees possible to working remotely. New recommendations were also introduced in the city, with residents over the age of 65 advised to not leave their home unless absolutely necessary.

On 26 September, new recommendations were introduced in Moscow Oblast, similar to those introduced in the capital, with residents over the age of 65 and those with chronic illnesses advised to not leave their homes unless necessary. Employers were also advised to switch as many employees possible to working remotely.

On 27 September, Sobyanin announced that the heating season in the city would begin the next day, earlier than usual. He also said that recommendations for the elderly and those with chronic illnesses to stay home would come into force that day.

On 28 September, Rospotrebnadzor head, Anna Popova, said that there was no need for new strict restrictions due to a rise in cases. She said that the situation had changed compared to the beginning of the year as well as the understanding of the virus, and attributed the rise in cases due to the seasonality of the virus. Moscow's health department denied reports on social networks of the death of a doctor after being vaccinated. Kremlin spokesman, Dmitry Peskov, said that authorities would look into the situation with additional payments for health workers after protests were staged by the All-Russian campaign "Pay for COVID!".

On 29 September, the health ministry said that hospital bed capacity for coronavirus patients was 89% full. Assistant Minister of Health Alexei Kuznetsov said that out of 129,750 beds deployed for coronavirus patients, 115,500 were occupied. He also said that capacity would be raised if necessary and noted that during the peak of the outbreak, 184,000 beds were assigned for coronavirus patients. Sobyanin announced that the autumn school holidays in Moscow would be raised from one week to two weeks. Sobyanin also signed a decree which states that stay-at-home recommendations would be last until 28 October. The Chairman of the State Duma, Volodin, said that 18 deputies were in hospital with the virus and that overall 60 deputies have been ill. The State Duma would also partially switch to working remotely.
