= Zlatoust constituency =

Zlatoust single-member constituency
- Constituency of the Russian State Duma

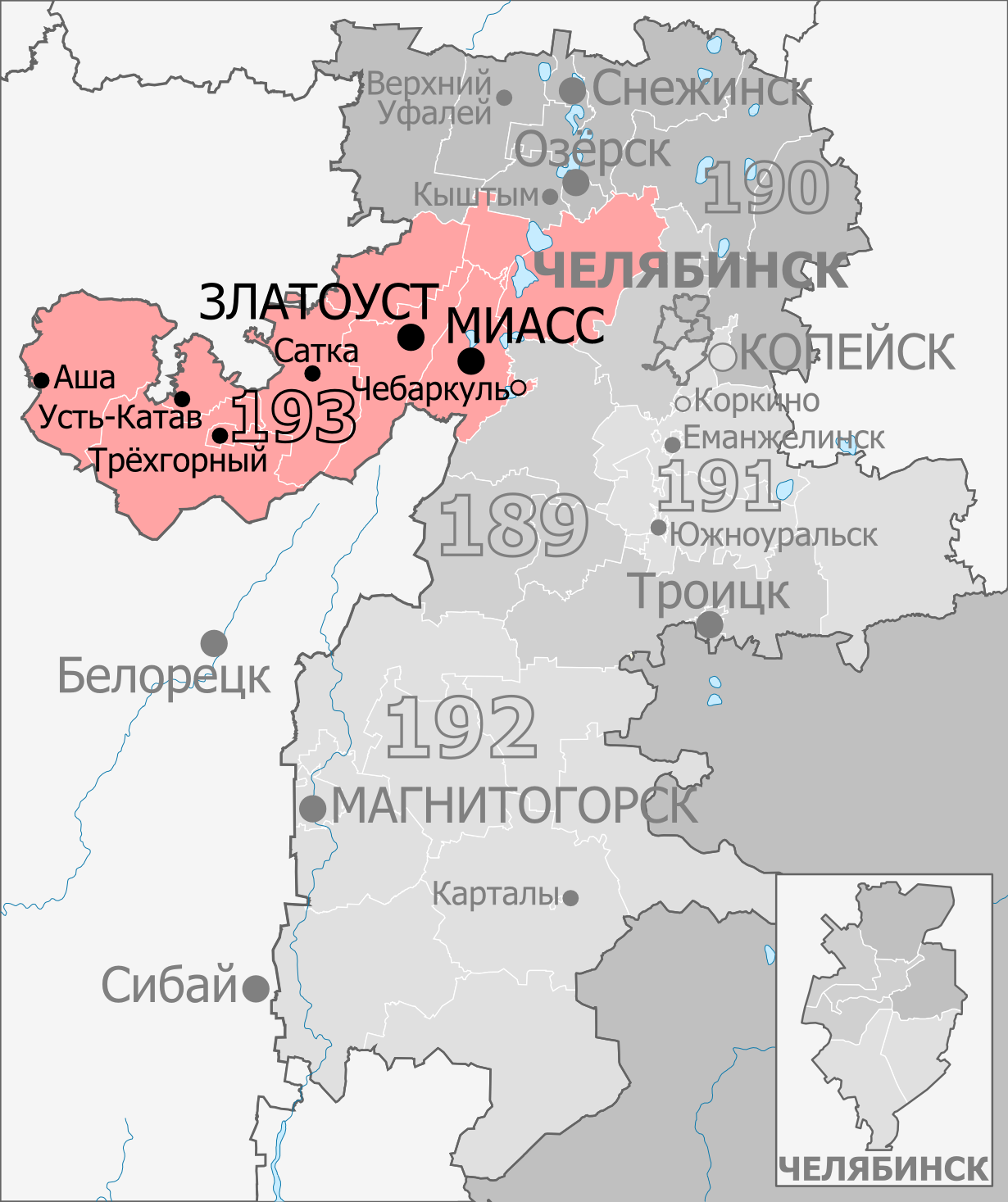
- Constituency boundaries since 2016
- Deputy: Anton Kovalyov; United Russia
- Federal subject: Chelyabinsk Oblast
- Districts: Argayashsky, Ashinsky, Chebarkul, Karabash, Katav-Ivanovsky, Kusinsky, Miass, Satkinsky, ZATO Tryokhgorny, Ust-Katav, Zlatoust
- Voters: 493,130 (2026)

The Zlatoust constituency (No.192 (Note: No.182 in 1993-2007, No.193 in 2016–2026)) is a Russian legislative constituency in Chelyabinsk Oblast. The constituency covers historical Mountain-Industrial Zone in northwestern Chelyabinsk Oblast.

The constituency has been represented since 2026 by United Russia deputy Anton Kovalyov, businessman and economics lecturer, who won the open seat after four-term United Russia incumbent Oleg Kolesnikov withdrew from the primary.

== Boundaries ==
1993–2007: Argayashsky District, Chebarkul, Chebarkulsky District, Karabash, Miass, Oktyabrsky District, Plast, Troitsk, Troitsky District, Uysky District, Zlatoust
The constituency covered eastern part of the Mountain-Industrial Zone and stretched from central to east-central Chelyabinsk Oblast, including the industrial towns Chebarkul, Karabash, Miass, Plast and Troitsk.

2016–present: Argayashsky District, Ashinsky District, Chebarkul, Karabash, Katav-Ivanovsky District, Kusinsky District, Miass, Satkinsky District, Tryokhgorny, Ust-Katav, Zlatoust
The constituency was re-created for the 2016 election under the name "Metallurgichesky constituency" and retained only its Mountain-Industrial Zone portion, losing central Chelyabinsk Oblast to Chelyabinsk constituency and Oktyabrsky District – to Korkino constituency. This seat instead gained western Mountain-Industrial Zone from Metallurgichesky constituency.

== Members elected ==
Election	Member	Party
1993	Vladimir Grigoriadi	Kedr
1995	Vladimir Grigoriadi	Congress of Russian Communities
1999	Pyotr Svechnikov	Communist Party
2003	Valery Panov	Independent
2007	Proportional representation - no election by constituency	
2011	Proportional representation - no election by constituency	
2016	Oleg Kolesnikov	United Russia
2021	Oleg Kolesnikov	United Russia
2026	Anton Kovalyov	United Russia

== Election results ==
=== 1993 ===
Summary of the 12 December 1993 Russian legislative election in the Zlatoust constituency
Candidate	Party	Votes	%
Vladimir Grigoriadi	Kedr	71,124	27.14%
Rais Atnagulov	Independent	60,811	23.21%
Lev Ubozhko	Independent	34,459	13.15%
Anatoly Karpov	Independent	27,924	10.66%
Aleksandr Kosopkin	Dignity and Charity	23,548	8.99%
Nikolay Bannykh	Independent	8,169	3.12%
against all		21,555	8.23%
Total		262,041	100%

=== 1995 ===
Summary of the 17 December 1995 Russian legislative election in the Zlatoust constituency
Candidate	Party	Votes	%
Vladimir Grigoriadi (incumbent)	Congress of Russian Communities	63,277	18.76%
Zhakslyk Altynbayev	Our Home – Russia	60,986	18.08%
Boris Vydrin	Communist Party	55,427	16.43%
Lev Ubozhko	Conservative Party	25,762	7.64%
Natalya Guseva	Women of Russia	24,740	7.33%
Anatoly Bokov	Yabloko	20,777	6.16%
Aleksandr Linev	Liberal Democratic Party	18,547	5.50%
Konstantin Somotov	Independent	17,840	5.29%
Andrey Karpov	Common Cause	8,737	2.59%
Aleksandr Fedik	Independent	5,168	1.53%
Sergey Kostromin	Union of Patriots	4,894	1.45%
Vasily Krutolapov	Forward, Russia!	4,179	1.24%
Gennady Temlyantsev	Independent	1,184	0.35%
against all		20,161	5.98%
Total		337,369	100%

=== 1999 ===
Summary of the 19 December 1999 Russian legislative election in the Zlatoust constituency
Candidate	Party	Votes	%
Pyotr Svechnikov	Communist Party	88,461	27.82%
Aleksandr Kuznetsov	Yabloko	77,492	24.37%
Aleksandr Pelevin	Independent	44,615	14.03%
Vladimir Grigoriadi (incumbent)	For Civil Dignity	36,745	11.56%
German Galkin	Union of Right Forces	10,275	3.23%
Aleksandr Linev	Liberal Democratic Party	9,885	3.11%
Yury Abubakirov	Independent	9,366	2.95%
Mikhail Lonshchakov	Independent	4,164	1.31%
Boris Mizrakhi	Our Home – Russia	3,194	1.00%
Mussa Dzugayev	Independent	2,336	0.73%
against all		25,624	8.06%
Total		317,996	100%

=== 2003 ===
Summary of the 7 December 2003 Russian legislative election in the Zlatoust constituency
Candidate	Party	Votes	%
Valery Panov	Independent	75,828	28.46%
Aleksandr Kuznetsov	Yabloko	48,314	18.13%
Pyotr Svechnikov (incumbent)	Communist Party	42,448	15.93%
Yevgenia Belousova	Independent	36,498	13.70%
Aleksandr Linev	Liberal Democratic Party	15,925	5.98%
Aleksandr Makeyev	Party of Russia's Rebirth-Russian Party of Life	6,007	2.25%
Ivan Vavilov	Agrarian Party	5,379	2.02%
Konstantin Skvortsov	Great Russia – Eurasian Union	2,106	0.79%
Sergey Mossakovsky	Independent	1,087	0.41%
against all		28,203	10.59%
Total		266,934	100%

=== 2016 ===
Summary of the 18 September 2016 Russian legislative election in the Zlatoust constituency
Candidate	Party	Votes	%
Oleg Kolesnikov	United Russia	77,470	32.44%
Sergey Vainshtein	Liberal Democratic Party	59,983	25.12%
Nikolay Pankratov	A Just Russia	28,349	11.87%
Ivan Nikitchuk	Communist Party	26,733	11.20%
Valikhan Turgumbayev	Party of Growth	15,343	6.43%
Natalya Tavrina	Yabloko	6,524	2.73%
Vasily Koshmar	Patriots of Russia	4,312	1.81%
Vasily Potapov	People's Freedom Party	3,544	1.48%
Yury Gumenyuk	Rodina	3,339	1.40%
Total		238,791	100%

=== 2021 ===
Summary of the 17-19 September 2021 Russian legislative election in the Zlatoust constituency
Candidate	Party	Votes	%
Oleg Kolesnikov (incumbent)	United Russia	81,994	34.75%
Pavel Loginov	A Just Russia — For Truth	37,141	15.74%
Konstantin Natsiyevsky	Communist Party	30,480	12.92%
Denis Lezin	New People	17,582	7.45%
Stepan Firstov	Party of Pensioners	16,488	6.99%
Mikhail Smetanin	Communists of Russia	13,601	5.76%
Vitaly Pashin	Liberal Democratic Party	13,142	5.57%
Sergey Gavryushkin	Rodina	7,279	3.09%
Pyotr Svechnikov	Russian Party of Freedom and Justice	5,959	1.53%
Total		235,936	100%

=== 2026 ===
Summary of the 18-20 September 2026 Russian legislative election in the Zlatoust constituency
Candidate	Party	Votes	%
Anton Kovalyov	United Russia	125,001	43.12%
Valentin Shilov	Communist Party	33,357	11.51%
Dmitry Sumin	A Just Russia	31,100	10.73%
Yevgeny Motovilov	New People	29,366	10.13%
Aleksey Selivanov	Party of Pensioners	22,836	7.88%
Kirill Kozhevnikov	Liberal Democratic Party	22,377	7.72%
Ilgam Gizatullin	The Greens	15,577	5.37%
Total		289,866	100%
