= Uvelsky =

Uvelsky (masculine), Uvelskaya (feminine), or Uvelskoye (neuter) may refer to:

- Uvelsky District, a district of Chelyabinsk Oblast, Russia
- Uvelsky (rural locality), a rural locality (a settlement) in Chelyabinsk Oblast, Russia
- Uvelsky (air base), an air base in Russia
