= Uysky =

Uysky (masculine), Uyskaya (feminine), or Uyskoye (neuter) may refer to:

- Uysky District, a district of Chelyabinsk Oblast, Russia
- Uyskoye, a rural locality (a selo) in Chelyabinsk Oblast, Russia
