= Plastovsky =

Plastovsky (masculine), Plastovskaya (feminine), or Plastovskoye (neuter) may refer to:

- Plastovsky District, a district in Chelyabinsk Oblast, Russia
- Plastovskoye Urban Settlement, a municipal formation which the Town of Plast in Plastovsky District of Chelyabinsk Oblast, Russia is incorporated as
