= Kopeysk Machine-Building plant =

Manufacturing facility in Russia

JSC Kopeysk Machine-Building plant
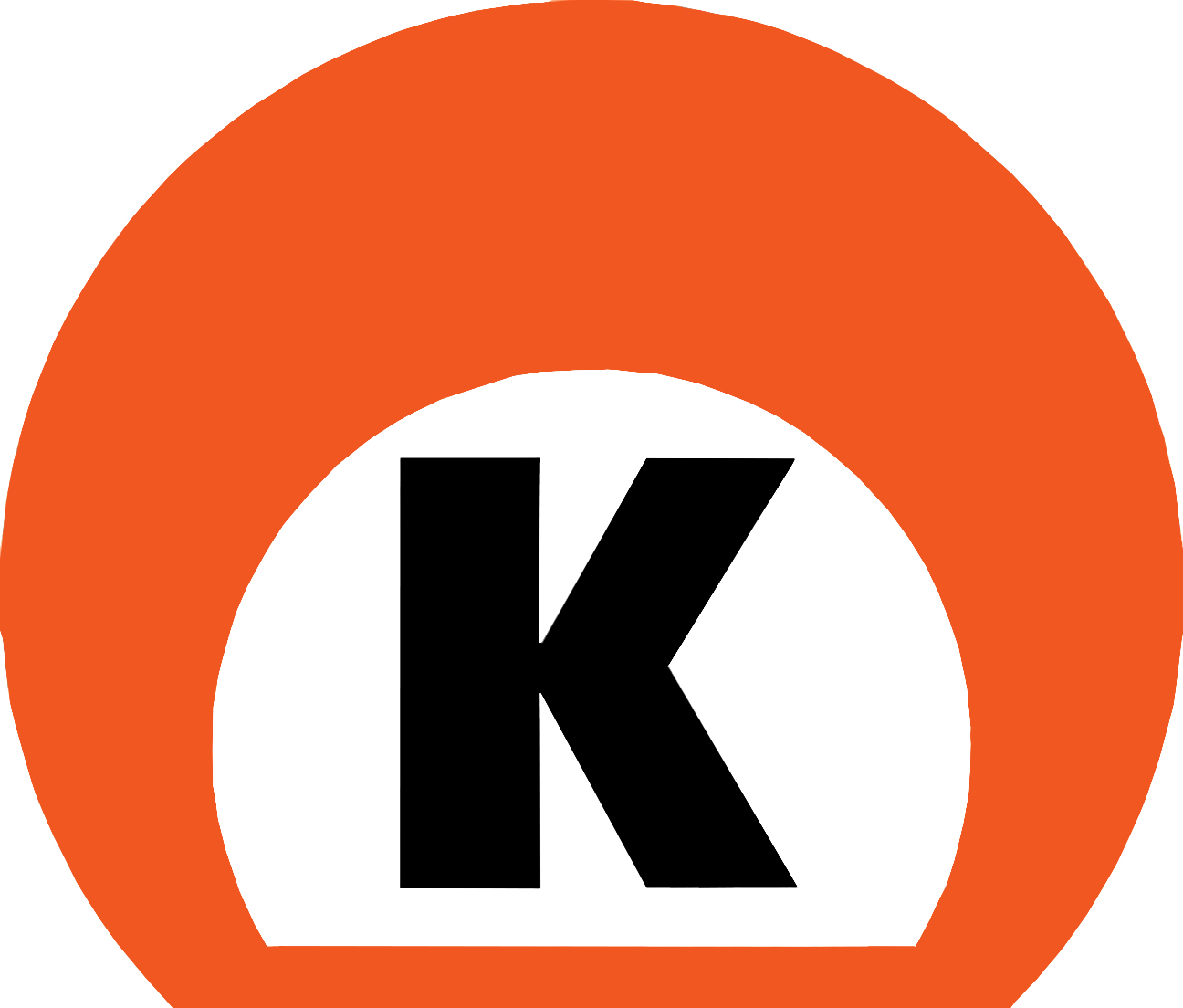
- Native name: Копейский машиностроительный завод
- Type: Joint stock company
- Industry: Mining machinery engineering (construction, mining),
- Founded: November 28, 1941; 84 years ago
- Headquarters: D 24, Lenin street, Kopeysk, Russia
- Key people: Victor Semenov (CEO) CEO (Chief Executing Officer)
- Products: Construction equipment; Mining equipment
- Revenue: 3.3 billion rubles (2015)
- Number of employees: 3,041 employees (2019)
- Website: http://kopemash.ru/

The Kopeysk Machine-Building plant (Russian: Копейский машиностроительный завод) is Russia's largest manufacturer of Mineral processing equipment and mining equipment, situated in Kopeysk, Chelyabinsk, Russia. Its products have been sold in over 30 countries.

== History ==
The company was founded on November 28, 1941; 84 years ago under the name Sergei Kirov State All-Union Machine-Building Plant. It combined the existing Kopeysk Mine Repair Plant with the resources of the Gorlovka Engineering Plant, which had been evacuated from Ukraine as a result of Operation Barbarossa.

On November 28, 1941, the plant began production of supplies for the war effort against Nazi Germany. In 1942 the plant was reconfigured to produce civilian goods, especially mining equipment, logging machines, pumps, and fans. In 1943, the company was awarded the Stalin Prize for its development of the "Kopeyskaya Pulsating Power-1", a new machine for cutting coal. In 1948, it assembled the first Walking Excavator in the Soviet Union (the ESH-1). In 1950, the plant's products were exported to Poland, Bulgaria, and China. In 1976 the company was decorated with an Order of the Red Banner of Labour.

In the 1990s, the company was reorganized into a joint stock company. It also developed a new machine, the K-500, for loading potash ores and salt. Between 2004 and 2010, the plant was re-equipped. In 2006, the Kopeysk Machine-Building Plant received a Letter of Acknowledgment from the President of the Russian Federation. In 2008, the plant developed the KP21-02 roadheader and the Ural-20R roadheader. The KP21 roadheader family are modern tunneling machines equipped with Remote control to ensure safety in mines prone to sudden outbursts of coal and gas.

== Quality Management ==
“Kopeysk Machine-Building plant” operates under the QMS and has been certified to the ISO 9001 International Standard and TÜV in design and production of mining equipment, communal services equipment, forging and machine foundry blanks.

== Products ==
The company produces mining equipment, metallurgy equipment, Underground mining equipment, and ore crushers.

- Roadheader: PK-3M, PK-10, KP330, KP220, KP220K, KP150, KP21-150, KP21, 1GPKS
- Trencher: 2086.31, 2086.51, AT, ATM
- Loader : 2PNB2B, MPK3, MPK3B, KALIY-4500
- Mine Drilling rig: UBSH-210A
- Coal Cutter: URAL-33M
- Heading-and-Winning Machines: URAL-10R, URAL-20R-11, URAL-20R-12, URAL-61A, URAL-60S
- Shuttle mine car: V17K
