= Valery Gartung =

Russian politician (born 1960)

Valery Gartung MP
- Валерий Гартунг
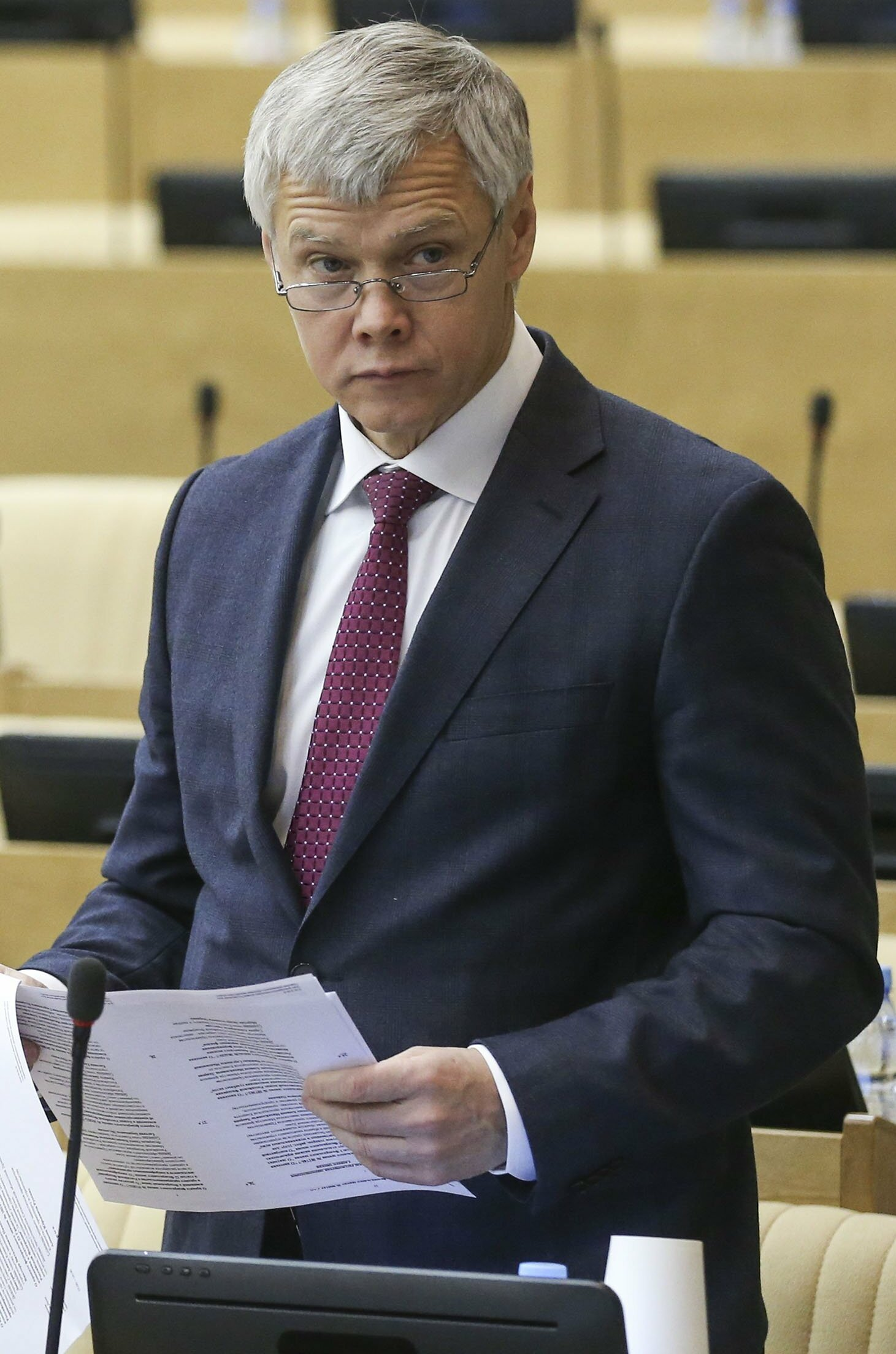
- Gartung in the State Duma building, 2018

Member of the State Duma for Chelyabinsk Oblast
- Incumbent
- Assumed office 12 October 2021
- Preceded by: Anatoly Litovchenko
- Constituency: Korkino (No. 191)
- In office 18 December 1997 – 24 December 2007
- Preceded by: Vladimir Utkin
- Succeeded by: constituencies abolished
- Constituency: Sovetsky (No. 186) (Note: renamed and renumbered as Korkino (No. 191) in 2016)

Member of the State Duma (Party List seat)
- In office 24 December 2007 – 12 October 2021

Personal details
- Born: 12 November 1960 (age 65) Kopeysk, Chelyabinsk Oblast, Russian SFSR, Soviet Union
- Party: A Just Russia (since 2007)
- Other political affiliations: Party of Pensioners (2002–2005)
- Spouse: Marina Gartung
- Children: 2 sons
- Education: South Ural State University

Valery Karlovich Gartung (Note: Also transliterated as Hartung.) (Russian: Валерий Карлович Гартунг; born 12 November 1960) is a Russian politician serving as the Member of the State Duma since 1997.

== Biography ==
He was born on 12 November 1960 in Kopeysk of Chelyabinsk Oblast in the family of a miner. Father is an ethnic German, mother is Etkul Cossack, raised three children.

In 1978 he graduated from school. In 1983 he graduated from the faculty of automotive engineering of South Ural State University with a degree in mechanical engineering (with honors). Since 1983 he worked at the Chelyabinsk blacksmith-press plant as a mechanic, master, senior master, head of the site. Since 1988 - Chairman of the cooperative "Leader" (production of sports equipment and spare parts for cars), since 1992 was a General Director of the insurance company "AMESK". From 1996 to 1997 was a General Director of JSC "Chelyabinsk forge-and-press plant".

In 1997 he founded the Children's Charity Fund named after Valery Gartung, which is headed by his wife Marina Gartung.

=== Political career ===
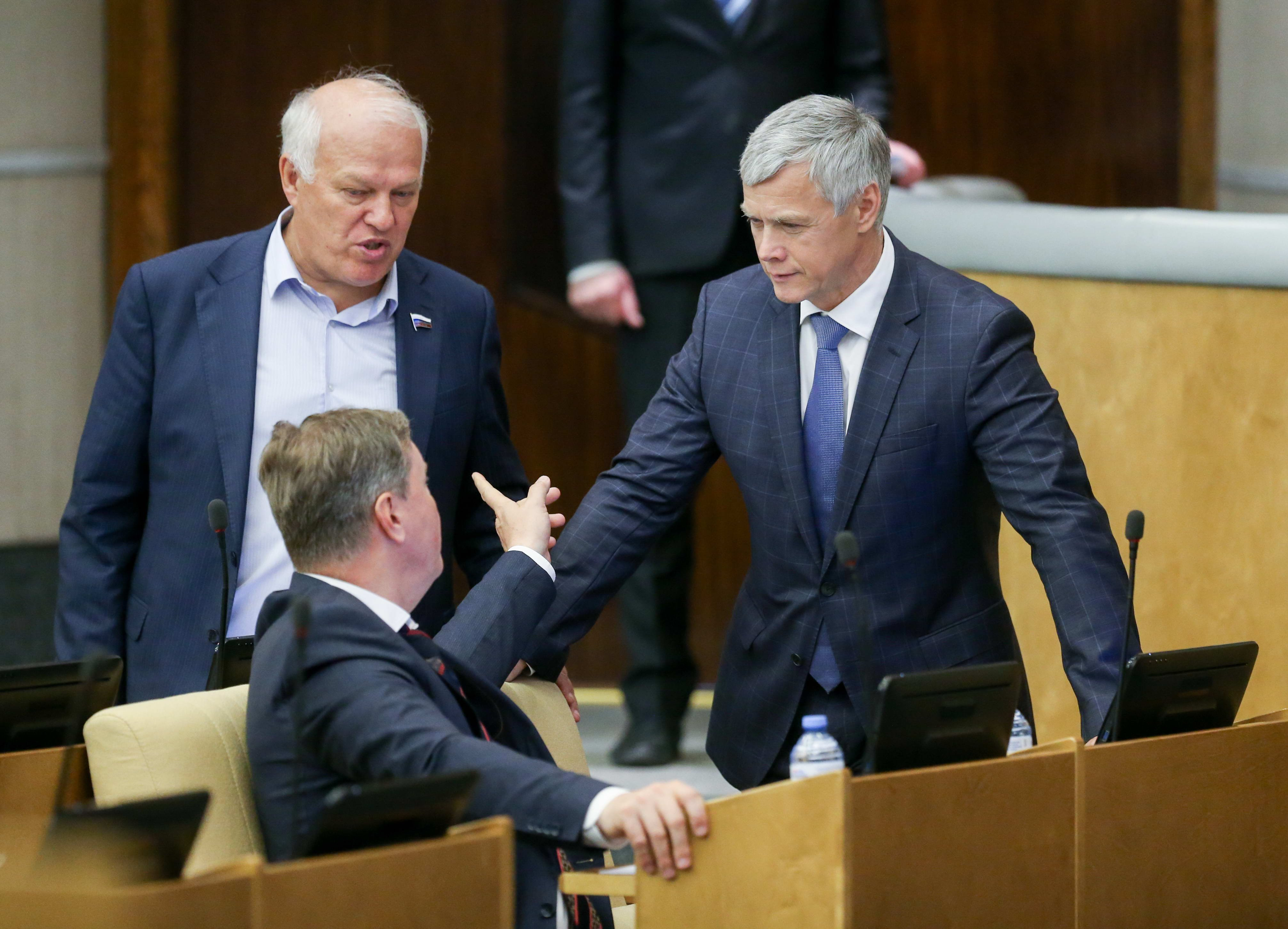
Hartung with Oleg Nilov and Anatoly Greshnevikov during the session of the State Duma

On 14 December 1997, at the by-election in the 186 single-mandate constituency of the Chelyabinsk Oblast, he was elected to the State Duma. In the State Duma he was a member of the parliamentary group "Russian Regions" and a member of the State Duma Committee on Budget, Taxes, Banks and Finance.

In 1999 he was re-elected to the State Duma in the same constituency, was a member of the parliamentary group "People's Deputy" and a member of the State Duma Committee on Budget and Taxes.

In the 2000 presidential election he was a trustee of presidential candidate Vladimir Putin. In December 2000, he ran for Governor of Chelyabinsk Oblast, took third place in the election, gaining 14% of the vote.

On 7 December 2003, he was re-elected to the State Duma from the 186 single-mandate constituency (68.5% of voters voted for him). Initially he was a member of the United Russia faction, later came out of their faction and more registered in the parliamentary association is not included. He was a member of the State Duma Committee on Budget and Taxes, and then a member of the State Duma Committee on Industry, Construction and High Technology.

In January 2002 he was elected Chairman of the Chelyabinsk regional branch of the Russian Party of Pensioners (RPP), as well as a member of its Central Council. At the extraordinary Congress of RPP on 31 January 2004 was appointed as Acting Chairman of the party (instead of Sergey Atroshenko). At the V Congress of RPP on 27 March 2004 almost unanimously (86 voted for his candidacy and only 1 — against) was elected Chairman of the Russian Party of Pensioners. In 2005, by a court decision was dismissed from the post of Chairman of RPP, in November 2006, the Presidium of the Moscow City Court overturned the decision of Meshchansky District Court on the recognition of incompetent decisions of IV and V Congresses of RPP, where Hartung was elected Chairman of the Party.

In 2007 he became the member of A Just Russia party.

In 2007 and 2011 and 2016, he was re-elected to the State Duma by A Just Russia party list in the Federal constituency.

Gartung is the deputy head of A Just Russia parliamentary group. He is a member of the State Duma Commission on Parliamentary Ethics and First Deputy Chairman of the State Duma Committee on Economic Policy, Industry, Innovation Development and Entrepreneurship.

=== Sanctions ===
He was sanctioned by Canada under the Special Economic Measures Act (S.C. 1992, c. 17) in relation to the Russian invasion of Ukraine for Grave Breach of International Peace and Security, and by the UK government in 2022 in relation to the Russo-Ukrainian War.

== Personal life ==
Gartung is married and has two sons: Andrey (born 1982) and Dmitry (born 1987). He has an interest in sports, including powerlifting and basketball.

His wife, Marina Veniaminovna Gartung, graduated from the Chelyabinsk Polytechnic Institute. She serves as the head of the Valery Gartung Children’s Charitable Foundation. In 2015, she was elected as a deputy of the Legislative Assembly of the Chelyabinsk Region of the 6th convocation from the party list, but declined the mandate.

Since January 2005, Andrey Gartung has been director of OAO Chelyabinsk Forge-and-Press Plant. In 2005, he ran for election to the Moscow City Duma on the list of the Russian Party of Pensioners, and also for the Legislative Assembly of the Chelyabinsk Region as a candidate from the same party.

According to income declarations for 2020, Valery Gartung reported 39.3 million rubles, while Marina Gartung reported 118.7 million rubles. She also owns property in Switzerland (190 m²) and Cyprus (94 m²).
