= Oleg Kolesnikov =

Russian politician

Oleg Kolesnikov MP
- Олег Колесников
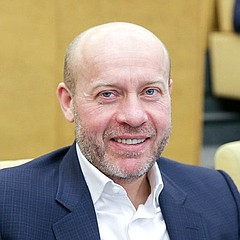

Member of the State Duma for Chelyabinsk Oblast
- Incumbent
- Assumed office 5 October 2016
- Preceded by: constituency re-established
- Constituency: Zlatoust (No. 193)

Member of the State Duma (Party List Seat)
- In office 24 December 2007 – 5 October 2016

Personal details
- Born: 11 September 1968 (age 58) Krasnogorsk, Moscow Oblast, Russian SFSR, Soviet Union
- Party: United Russia (from 2011); LDPR (until 2011)
- Education: South Ural State University

Oleg Alekseevich Kolesnikov (Russian: Олег Алексеевич Колесников; born September 11, 1968, Krasnogorsk, Moscow Oblast) is a Russian political figure and deputy of the 5th, 6th, 7th, and 8th State Dumas.

In 1989, Kolesnikov started engaging in business, first as an assistant broker on the stock exchange and then as deputy director. From 1996 to 1998, he served as an assistant on commerce and economics at the Chelyabinsk network of pharmacies named "Klassika". In 2005, he was elected deputy of the Legislative Assembly of Chelyabinsk Oblast and ran for the Liberal Democratic Party of Russia. In 2007, he became deputy of the 5th State Duma from the Chelyabinsk Oblast constituency. In 2011, he left the Liberal Democratic Party of Russia to become a member of the United Russia. In 2011, 2016 and 2021, he was re-elected for the 6th, 7th, and 8th State Dumas respectively.

In 2019–2021, Kolesnikov was involved in a series of scandals. For instance, it was revealed that in the 1990s, he was convicted of violating three articles of the Criminal Code of Russia, including "sale and distribution of drugs", "engagement in prohibited types of individual activities", and "conduction of illegal business". At the same time, the accumulated debts of Kolesnikov and his wife's business exceeded 1.3 billion rubles. Despite it, Kolesnikov's candidacy was still supported by the governor Aleksey Teksler. According to the local media, in exchange for the support, Kolesnikov promised to build in the region a new aquapark.

== Family and Interests ==
He is married. His wife, Lena Rafikovna Kolesnikova, is the Chair of the Congress of Tatars of the Chelyabinsk Region and a deputy of the Legislative Assembly of the Chelyabinsk Region.

== Awards ==
- Badge of Distinction "For Merit to the Chelyabinsk Region" (2012)
- “Person of the Year” Award by Delovoy Kvartal magazine (2011)
- Medal “For Bravery” (Donetsk People’s Republic, 2023)
- Order of Courage (2023)

== Sanctions ==
He was sanctioned by the UK government in 2022 in relation to the Russo-Ukrainian War.
