= Yetkul =

Rural locality in Chelyabinsk Oblast, Russia

Yetkul Еткуль
- Selo
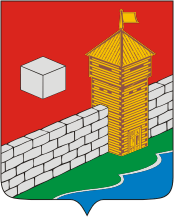
- Coat of arms
- Interactive map of Yetkul
- Location of Yetkul Yetkul (Chelyabinsk Oblast)
- Coordinates: 54°49′45″N 61°35′23″E
- Country: Russia
- Federal subject: Chelyabinsk Oblast
- Administrative district: Yetkulsky District
- SettlementSelsoviet: Yetkulsky Settlement
- Founded: 1763

Population (2010 Census)
  - Total: 6,760
  - Estimate (2025): 6,416 (−5.1%)

Administrative status
  - Capital of: Yetkulsky District, Yetkulsky Settlement

Municipal status
  - Municipal district: Yetkulsky Municipal District
  - Rural settlement: Yetkulsky Rural Settlement
  - Capital of: Yetkulsky Municipal District, Yetkulsky Rural Settlement
- Time zone: UTC+5 (MSK+2)
- Postal code: 456560
- Dialing code: +7 35145
- OKTMO ID: 75620430101

Yetkul (Russian: Еткуль) is a rural locality (a selo) and the administrative center of Yetkulsky District, Chelyabinsk Oblast, Russia. Population: 6,760 (2010 census); 6,208 (2002 census); 5,689 (1989 Soviet census).
