= Oktyabrskoye, Chelyabinsk Oblast =

Rural locality in Chelyabinsk Oblast, Russia

Coordinates: 54°24′32″N 62°43′31″E

Oktyabrskoye (Russian: Октябрьское) is a rural locality (a selo) and the administrative center of Oktyabrsky District, Chelyabinsk Oblast, Russia. Population: 6,780 (2010 census); 7,562 (2002 census); 7,975 (1989 Soviet census).
