= Plastovsky District =

Plastovsky District Пластовский район (Russian)
- District
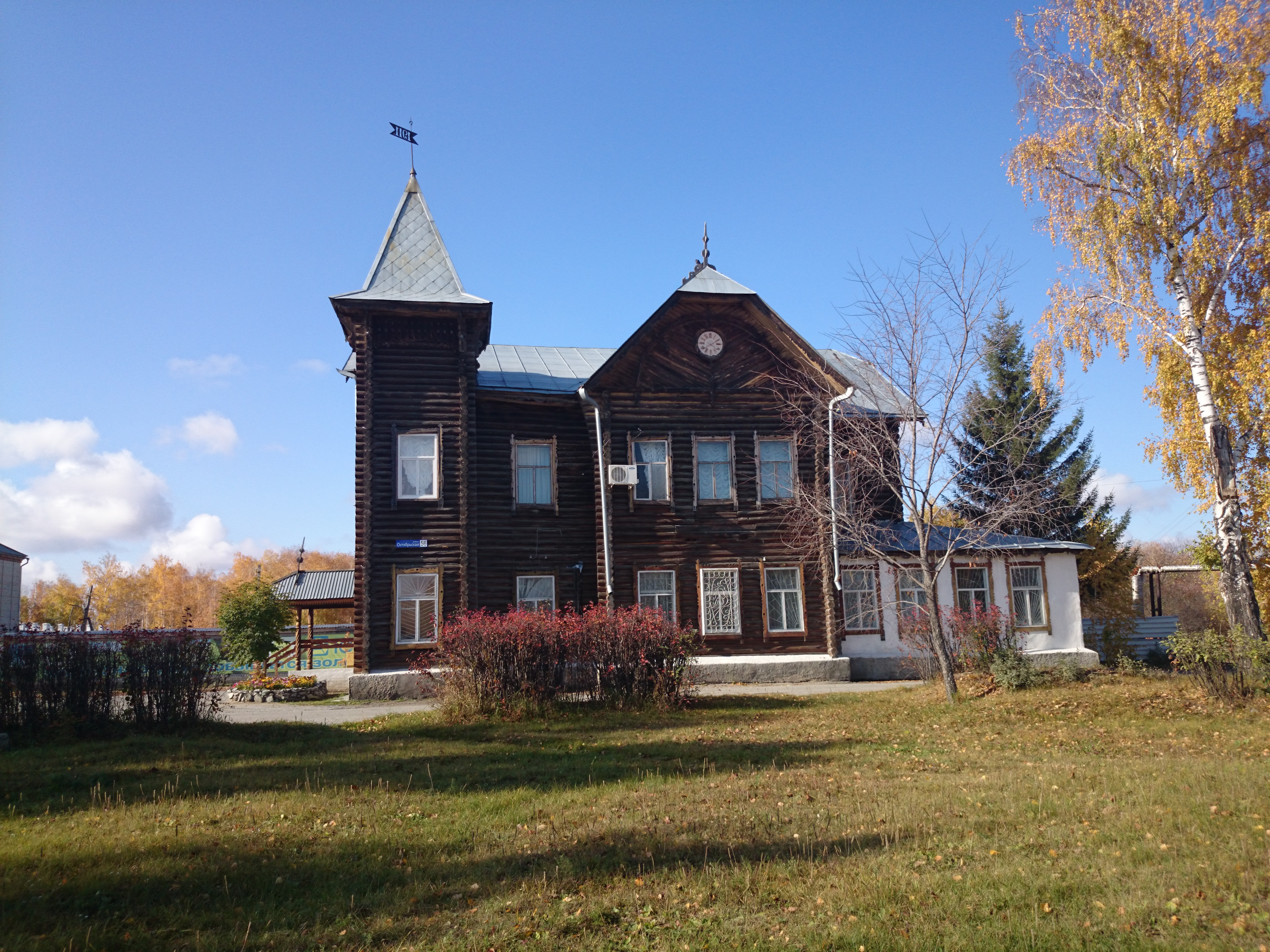
- Museum in Plast, Plastovsky District

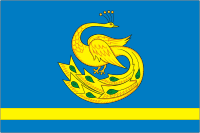
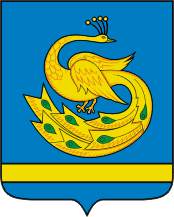
- Flag Coat of arms
- Location of Plastovsky District in Chelyabinsk Oblast
- Coordinates: 54°22′N 60°49′E
- Country: Russia
- Federal subject: Chelyabinsk Oblast
- Established: 3 November 1923
- Administrative center: Plast

Area
  - Total: 1,751.76 km^{2} (676.36 sq mi)

Population (2010 Census)
  - Total: 8,624
  - Density: 4.923/km^{2} (12.75/sq mi)
  - Urban: 0%
  - Rural: 100%

Administrative structure
  - Administrative divisions: 1 Towns, 4 Selsoviets
  - Inhabited localities: 1 cities/towns, 19 rural localities

Municipal structure
  - Municipally incorporated as: Plastovsky Municipal District
  - Municipal divisions: 1 urban settlements, 4 rural settlements
- Time zone: UTC+5 (MSK+2)
- OKTMO ID: 75648000
- Website: http://www.plastrayon.ru/

Plastovsky District (Russian: Пластовский райо́н) is an administrative and municipal district (raion), one of the twenty-seven in Chelyabinsk Oblast, Russia. It is located in the center of the oblast. The area of the district is 1,751.76 square kilometers (676.36 sq mi). Its administrative center is the town of Plast. Population (excluding the administrative center): 8,624 (2010 census).

== Geography ==
Plastovsky District is located in the center of Chelyabinsk Oblast, in the transition zone between the forest-steppe of the Ural Mountains, 50 km to the west, and the steppe to the east. Average elevation is 200-250 meters, rising to 420 meters in the southwest. There is a large pine forest reserve (Sanarsky Zakaznick) in the south of the district. Underlying rock is granite, with occasional slate and limestone.

Plastovsky District is 80 km southwest of the city of Chelyabinsk, and 1,400 km southeast of Moscow. The area measures 35 km (north-south), and 40 km (west-east); total area is 1,751 km2 (about 2.0% of Chelyabinsk Oblast). The administrative center is the town of Plast.

The district is bordered on the north by Chebarkulsky District, on the east by Uvelsky District, on the south by Troitsky District, and on the west by Uysky District.

== History ==
Gold-bearing sands and veins of the area were first worked in 1845, with the opening of the Kochkarskoye gold fields. Gold has been the main industry of Plast throughout the history of the district, with other mineral businesses based on silver, kyanite, kaolin, and granite building stone.
