= Sergei Ushakov (footballer) =

Russian footballer and coach

Personal information
- Full name: Sergei Viktorovich Ushakov
- Date of birth: 27 April 1965 (age 61)
- Place of birth: Kopeysk, Russian SFSR
- Height: 1.72 m (5 ft 7 1/2 in)
- Position: Defender

Youth career
- DYuSSh #1 Gulkevichi

Senior career*
Years	Team	Apps	(Gls)
1982–1986	FC Dynamo Stavropol	116	(2)
1987	FC Dynamo Moscow	0	(0)
1987	FC Dynamo Stavropol	21	(0)
1988	FC Dynamo Moscow	9	(0)
1988–1990	FC Dynamo Stavropol	82	(1)
1991	FC Kairat	38	(1)
1992	FC Venets Gulkevichi	2	(0)
1992–2000	FC Dynamo Stavropol	251	(5)
2001	FC Zhemchuzhina-Lukoil Budyonnovsk (amateur)		
2002	FC Venets Gulkevichi	16	(0)
2002	FC Zhemchuzhina Budyonnovsk	8	(0)

Managerial career
- 2007: FC Dynamo-2 Stavropol
- * Club domestic league appearances and goals

Sergei Viktorovich Ushakov (Russian: Серге́й Викторович Ушаков; born 27 April 1965) is a Russian professional football coach and a former player.

== Club career ==
He made his professional debut in the Soviet Second League in 1982 for FC Dynamo Stavropol.
