= Yetkulsky District =

Yetkulsky District Еткульский район (Russian)
- District
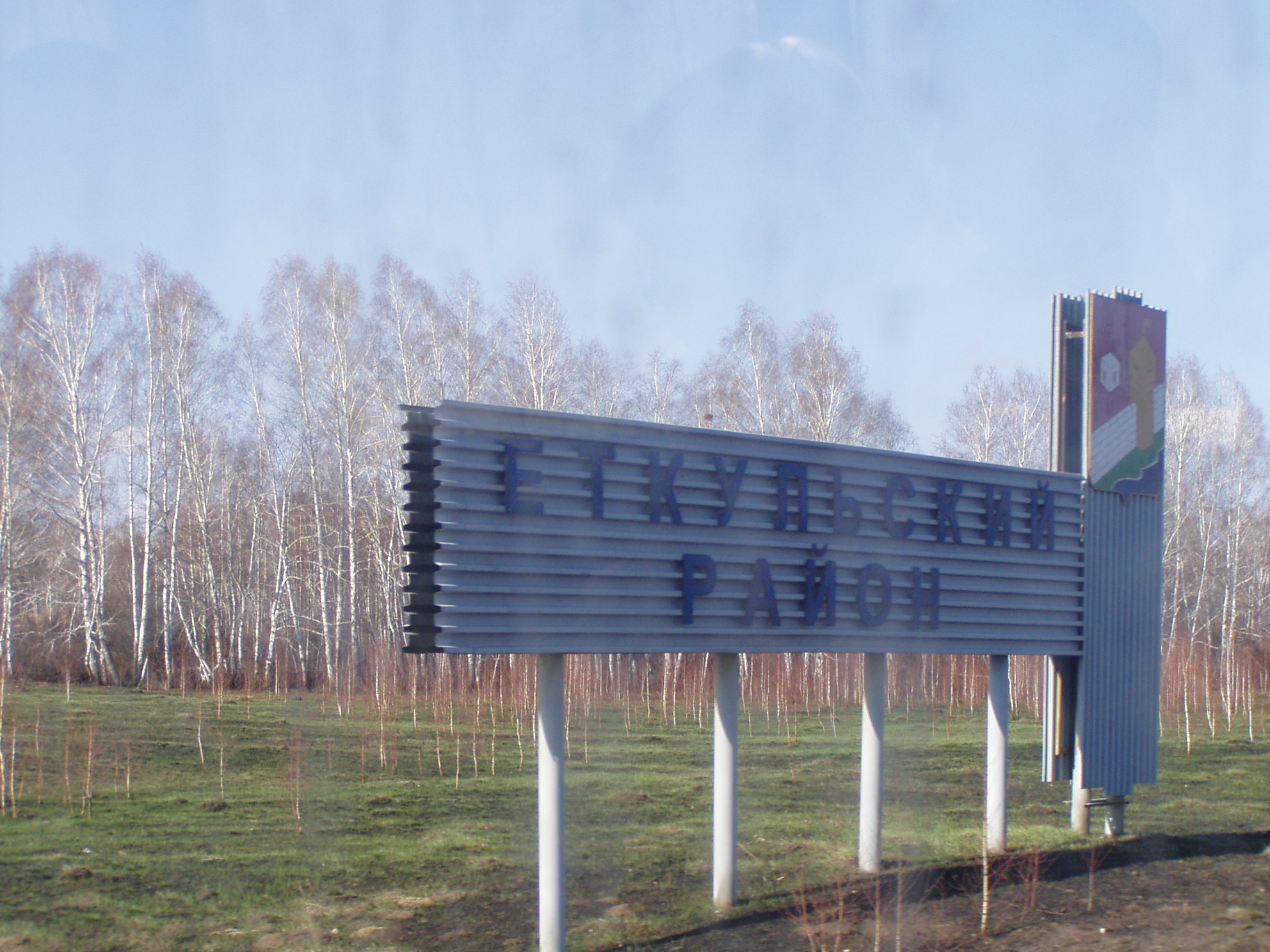
- Welcome sign on the border of Yetkulsky District

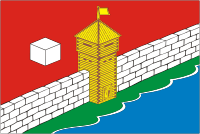
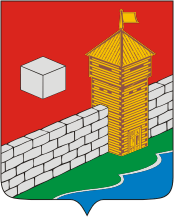
- Flag Coat of arms
- Location of Yetkulsky District in Chelyabinsk Oblast
- Coordinates: 54°49′31″N 61°35′10″E
- Country: Russia
- Federal subject: Chelyabinsk Oblast
- Administrative center: Yetkul

Area
  - Total: 2,525 km^{2} (975 sq mi)

Population (2010 Census)
  - Total: 30,697
  - Density: 12.16/km^{2} (31.49/sq mi)
  - Urban: 0%
  - Rural: 100%

Administrative structure
  - Administrative divisions: 12 selsoviet
  - Inhabited localities: 42 rural localities

Municipal structure
  - Municipally incorporated as: Yetkulsky Municipal District
  - Municipal divisions: 0 urban settlements, 12 rural settlements
- Time zone: UTC+5 (MSK+2)
- OKTMO ID: 75620000
- Website: http://www.admetkul.ru/

Yetkulsky District (Russian: Е́ткульский район) is an administrative and municipal district (raion), one of the twenty-seven in Chelyabinsk Oblast, Russia. It is located in the east of the oblast. The area of the district is 2,525 square kilometers (975 sq mi). Its administrative center is the rural locality (a selo) of Yetkul. Population: 30,697 (2010 census); 30,165 (2002 Census); 29,239 (1989 Soviet census). The population of Yetkul accounts for 22.0% of the district's total population.
