= Federal Agency for Tourism =

Tourism agency of Russia

Federal Agency for Tourism (Rostourism)
- Федеральное агентство по туризму (Ростуризма)
- Russian coat of arms

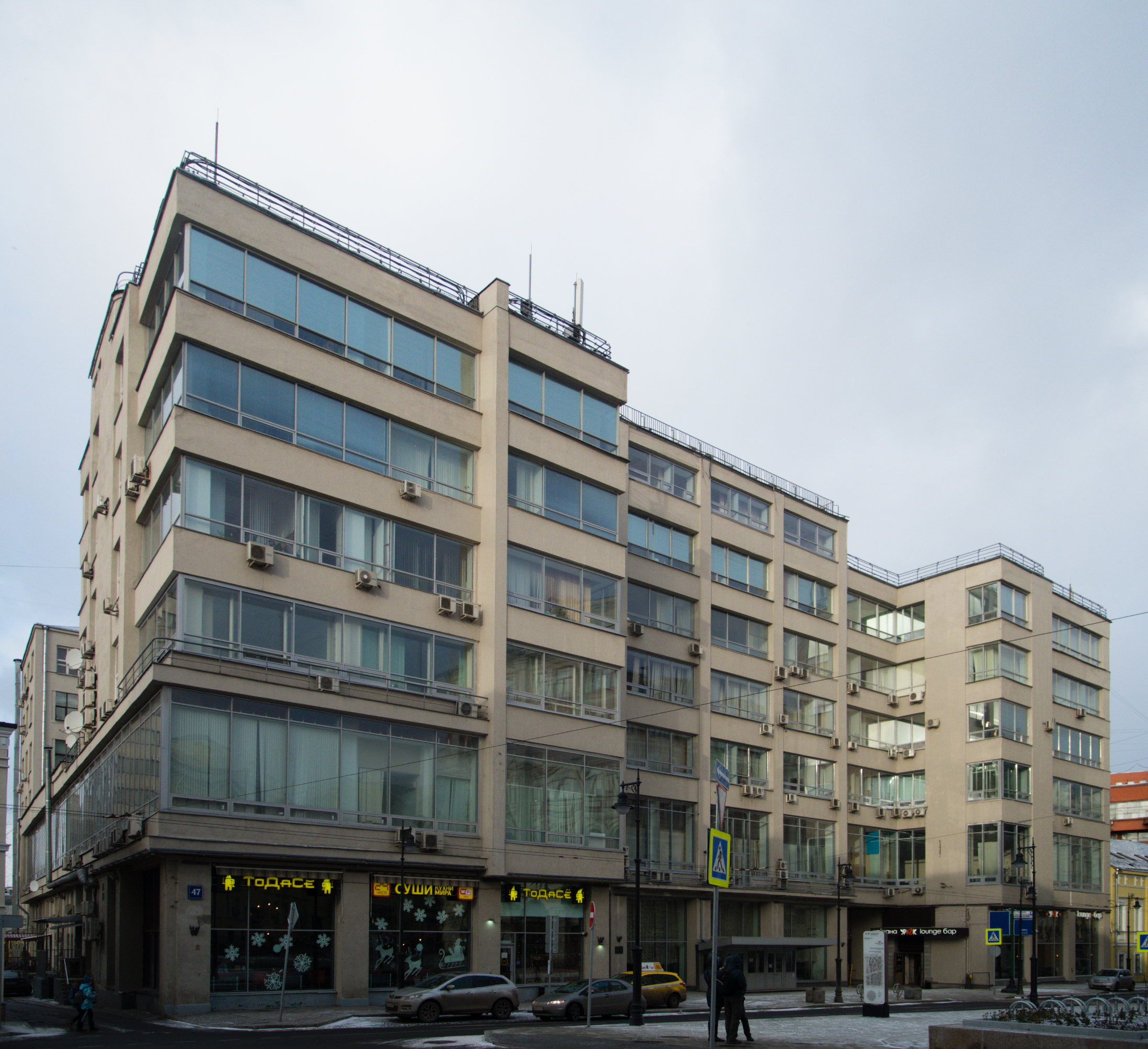
- Rostourism Head Office

Federal government agency overview
- Formed: November 18, 2004; 21 years ago
- Preceding agencies: Ministry of Culture of the RSRF; Ministry of Physical Education and Tourism; The Committee for Tourism of the Russian Federation (Roskomuturizm); State Committee of the Russian Federation for Physical Education, Sports, and Tourism; Federal Agency for Physical Education, Sports, and Tourism; The Ministry of Sport, Tourism, and Youth Policy
- Dissolved: October 20, 2022; 3 years ago
- Superseding Federal government agency: Ministry for Economic Development
- Jurisdiction: Government of the Russian Federation
- Headquarters: Myasnitskaya Ulitsa, 47, Moscow, Russia, 101000; 55.768837°N 37.6426773°E
- Federal government agency executives: Oleg Petrovich Safonov, Head of the Federal Agency for Tourism; Konyushkov Alexey Alekseevich, Deputy Head; Korneyev Sergey Evgenievich, Deputy Head; Korolyov Nikolay Vadimovich, Deputy Head; Skory Roman Petrovich, Deputy Head
- Child agencies: National Marketing Center for Tourism (Visit Russia); National Corporation for the Development of Tourism
- Key document: Presidential Decree No. 1453 of November 18, 2004
- Website: tourism.gov.ru
- Russia

The Federal Agency for Tourism (Rostourism) was a federal executive body of the Russian Federation, created by Presidential Decree No. 1453 of November 18, 2004 and dissolved on October 20, 2022. The Federal Agency for Tourism was responsible for rendering state services, managing state property and performing law-enforcement functions in the field of tourism. It was under the direct jurisdiction of the government of Russia. Activities of the Federal Agency for Tourism guided by the Constitution of the Russian Federation, Federal laws, Decrees of the President and the Government of the Russian Federation, and international treaties. The Federal Agency for Tourism carried out its activities in cooperation with other federal executive bodies, executive authorities of the subjects of the Russian Federation, local self-governing bodies, public associations and other organizations. The Federal Agency for Tourism was a legal entity, had a seal with the image of the State Coat of Arms of the Russian Federation and its name, other seals, stamp, and letterhead, as well as bank and other accounts opened. It received funding for its operation and project implementation from the federal budget. The agency head office was in Moscow.

== History ==
The Council for Foreign Tourism under the Cabinet of Ministers of the USSR established In April 1991 at the same time the State Committee for Foreign Tourism abolished. The Ministry of Physical Education and Tourism formed in January 1992 it had a separate department for tourism. Its responsibility was to manage and develop the domestic and foreign tourism sector. The Ministry of Culture and Tourism of the Russian Federation created on 27 March 1992. On the basis, the Ministry of Culture of the RSFSR abolished. A Provisional Interdepartmental Commission on Foreign and Domestic Tourism of the Russian Federation formed on 20 April 1992. New state policies were adopted to develop tourism sector such as; Domestic and Foreign tourism integrated into a single framework, a network of small hotels created, etc.

The Committee for Tourism of the Russian Federation (Roskomuturizm) established in September 1992. Its responsibility was to develop a strategy for the development of tourism in Russia, implementation of state policy of tourism, organization, development, and implementation of federal targeted and interstate programs. Training, retraining, and upgrading human resources in the tourism sector, establishing new bodies of tourism management in the territories, regions, autonomous entities and city of Moscow and St. Peters burg was also in its responsibility. The Roskomuturizm transformed into the Russian Federation Committee on Youth, Physical Education, and Tourism on 25 April 1994. The responsibility of the Committee was developing a state strategy, Inter-regional and Inter-sectoral coordination in the field of Physical Education and tourism, preservation/development of tourist centers and administrating national tourism sector. In August 1994, it unified with the Russian Federation Committee on Physical Education and reformed to the State Committee of the Russian Federation for Physical Education and Tourism (CFT of Russia).

June 1999 the State Committee of the Russian Federation for Physical Education and Tourism converted into the Ministry of Physical Education, Sports and Tourism. The tourism department in the new ministry headed by a deputy minister; at that time by Vladimir Igorevich Strzhalkovsky. On 17 May 2000 the Ministry of the Russian Federation for Physical Education, Sports and Tourism converted as the State Committee of the Russian Federation on Physical Education, Sport, and Tourism. At the same time, Ministry of Economic Development and Trade also formed with a Department of Tourism. The State Committee of the Russian Federation for Physical Education, Sports, and Tourism transformed into the State Committee of the Russian Federation for Physical Education and Sports on 29 April 2002. The Federal Agency for Physical Education, Sports, and Tourism (Rossport) established on March 12, 2004, initially it administered by the Ministry of Health and Social Development of the Russian Federation.

On 18 November 2004, the Federal Agency for Physical Education, Sports, and Tourism, divided into two agencies. One was The Federal Agency for Tourism of the Russian Federation; under the direct jurisdiction of the government of the Russian Federation And the other was Federal Agency for Physical Education and Sports; under the administration of the Ministry of Health and Social Development of the Russian Federation. The Ministry of Sport, Tourism, and Youth Policy established in 2008 and The Federal Agency for Tourism of the Russian Federation with the Federal Agency for Physical Education and Sports of the Russian Federation transferred under its authority. On 21 May 2012, the Ministry of Sport, Tourism and Youth Policy renamed as The Russian Ministry of Sports. On 22 May 2012, the Federal Agency for Tourism of the Russian Federation was transferred, under the jurisdiction of the Ministry of culture.

A presidential ukase signed on June 5, 2020 transferred the Federal Agency for Tourism out of the control of the Ministry of Economic Development; it was now a body controlled directly by the government of Russia.

On October 20, 2022, the Federal Agency for Tourism was dissolved and its functions transferred to the Ministry of Economic Development.

== Functions ==
Realization of the state strategy of tourism with the priority oriented planning and activities. Formation and maintenance of a single federal register of tour operators. Development and implementation of strategic plans on issues related to tourism industry within the jurisdiction of the Russian Federation. Information support of tourism, including assistance in the creation and functioning of tourist information centers, navigation and orientation systems in the field of tourism. It provided information to travel agents, tour operators, and tourists about safety threats in a country or place to visit. It promoted the tourism product of the Russian Federation in the domestic and world tourism markets. Managed the procurement of goods, works, and services for the agency or any other agencies related to it as per the demand. It was the Owner of the federal properties in the tourism sector and can practices ownership rights on such properties. Acted as the Federal public authority to federal institutions and federal unitary enterprises subordinate to the agency. Conducted economic analysis of the activities of subordinate state unitary enterprises. Audited financial and economic activities of the organizations subordinate to the Agency. Inaugurate Scientific, technical and innovative programs and projects in the field of tourism. It cooperated with the authorities of foreign states and international organizations. It represented on behalf of the Government of the Russian Federation and the Ministry of Culture of the Russian Federation in international organizations in the tourism field. The agency opened representative offices outside the Russian Federation to promote tourism. Provided related supports, ensured timely and complete consideration of oral and written appeals of citizens, adoption of decisions on them and responding to applicants. Ensured protection of information constituting a state secret. Organizes and provided training for the human resources of the agency and organizations under its authority. Arranged additional professional education of Agency employees. It carried out work on acquisition, storage, accounting and use of archival documents produced in the course of the Agency's activities. The agency organized congresses, conferences, seminars, exhibitions and other events. Took measures to support small and medium-sized businesses, aiming development, including the implementation of relevant departmental target programs. Registered new tour operators in the single federal register of tour operators and issues certificates of registration. Performed functions to manage state property and provide public services in the tourism sector. Every year the Rosturizm attended exhibitions in Madrid, Berlin, London, Paris, etc.to represent the Russian Federation to attract both professional participants of the tourist market and potential tourists.

== Rights to exercise power ==
It had the following rights to exercise power: Request and receive information necessary for making decisions on matters within the competence of the Agency. Give explanations to legal entities and individuals on issues within the competence of the Agency. It had the awarding right of departmental decorations of the Ministry of Culture of the Russian Federation. The agency had the right to have a heraldic sign - emblem, flag, and pennant, established by the Ministry of Culture of the Russian Federation in consultation with the Heraldic Council. It had the right to exercise administrative power in the tourism sector. It has the right to receive federal budget funds. It can appoint scientific and other organizations, scientists and specialists to study issues related to the scope of the Agency's activities. To establish coordinating, advisory and expert bodies (councils, commissions, groups, colleges), including interdepartmental ones. Establish mass media for the publication of official announcements, placement of other materials on the issues within the competence of the Agency.

== Structure ==
The Federal Agency for Tourism headed by a head appointed and dismissed by the Government of the Russian Federation on the proposal of the Minister of Culture of the Russian Federation. The head of the Federal Agency for Tourism is personally responsible for the fulfillment of the powers conferred on the Agency and the implementation of state policy in the established sphere. The head of the Federal Agency for Tourism has deputies. The government of the Russian Federation on the proposal of the Minister of Culture of the Russian Federation appoints and dismisses the deputy heads. From 15 January 2015, the head of the agency is Mr. Oleg Petrovich Safonov. The Government of the Russian Federation determines how many deputy heads will appoint. Currently, it has four deputy heads. They are Konyushkov Alexey Alekseevich, Korneyev Sergey Evgenievich, Korolyov Nikolay Vadimovich and Skory Roman Petrovich. Structural subdivision of the agency is the five Directorates. They are Directorate of State Tourist Projects and Safety in Tourism, Legal Directorate, Directorate of International Cooperation, Directorate of Domestic Tourism and State Target Programs, Administrative Directorate. This directorate has many departments.

== Responsibility and power of the head and deputy heads ==
=== Responsibility and power of the head ===
Head of the Agency distributes duties between his deputies. Represent the Minister of Culture of the Russian Federation, nationally and internationally. He drafts regulations on the Agency. Propose the maximum number of employees and remuneration fund for Agency's head office. Propose candidacies for the posts of deputy heads of the Agency. Drafting annual plan and forecast indicators of the Agency's activities, preparing reports on their implementation. The right to award departmental decoration of the Ministry of Culture of the Russian Federation to agency employees subordinate organizations, as well as other persons carrying out activities in the sphere of the agency. Approve the structural divisions of the Agency. Appoints and dismisses Agency employees. Take executive decisions related to federal civil service in the Agency. He approves the structure and staffing of the head office of the agency within the limits of the labor remuneration fund and the number of employees. Provide cost estimates for the maintenance of the Agency for the corresponding period of Federal Budget. Submit proposal to the Ministry of Finance on the drafting of the federal budget for the relevant year.

== See also ==
- Intourist

== General References ==
1. Regulation on The Federal Agency for Tourism
2. Detailed information on Federal Agency for Tourism
