= Uyskoye =

Rural locality in Chelyabinsk Oblast, Russia

Uyskoye Уйское
- Selo
- Interactive map of Uyskoye
- Location of Uyskoye Uyskoye (Chelyabinsk Oblast)
- Coordinates: 54°22′35″N 59°59′49″E
- Country: Russia
- Federal subject: Chelyabinsk Oblast
- Administrative district: Uysky District
- SettlementSelsoviet: Uysky Settlement
- First mentioned: 1742

Population (2010 Census)
  - Total: 7,352
  - Estimate (2021): 6,728 (−8.5%)

Administrative status
  - Capital of: Uysky District, Uysky Settlement

Municipal status
  - Municipal district: Uysky Municipal District
  - Rural settlement: Uysky Rural Settlement
  - Capital of: Uysky Municipal District, Uysky Rural Settlement
- Time zone: UTC+5 (MSK+2)
- Postal code: 456470
- Dialing code: +7 35165
- OKTMO ID: 75656488101

Uyskoye (Russian: Уйское) is a rural locality (a selo) and the administrative center of Uysky District, Chelyabinsk Oblast, Russia. Population: 7,352 (2010 census); 7,724 (2002 census); 7,146 (1989 Soviet census).

== Notable residents ==
- Alexander Tikhonov (born 1947), Russian biathlete
