= Korkino =

Korkino (Russian: Коркино) is the name of several inhabited localities in Russia.

Urban localities

- Korkino, Chelyabinsk Oblast, a town in Korkinsky District of Chelyabinsk Oblast

Rural localities

- Korkino, Kostroma Oblast, a village in Serednyakovskoye Settlement of Kostromskoy District in Kostroma Oblast; 57°41′N 40°58′E
- Korkino, Tosnensky District, Leningrad Oblast, a village under the administrative jurisdiction of Lyubanskoye Settlement Municipal Formation in Tosnensky District of Leningrad Oblast; 59°18′N 31°13′E
- Korkino, Vsevolozhsky District, Leningrad Oblast, a village in Koltushskoye Settlement Municipal Formation of Vsevolozhsky District in Leningrad Oblast; 59°56′N 30°43′E
- Korkino, Tyumen Oblast, a selo in Korkinsky Rural Okrug of Uporovsky District in Tyumen Oblast
- Korkino, Gavrilov-Yamsky District, Yaroslavl Oblast, a village in Shopshinsky Rural Okrug of Gavrilov-Yamsky District in Yaroslavl Oblast
- Korkino, Nekouzsky District, Yaroslavl Oblast, a village in Shestikhinsky Rural Okrug of Nekouzsky District in Yaroslavl Oblast
- Korkino, Rybinsky District, Yaroslavl Oblast, a village in Makarovsky Rural Okrug of Rybinsky District in Yaroslavl Oblast
