= Uvelsky (rural locality) =

Rural locality in Chelyabinsk Oblast, Russia

Coordinates: 54°26′39″N 61°21′26″E

Uvelsky (Russian: Увельский) is a rural locality (a settlement) and the administrative center of Uvelsky District, Chelyabinsk Oblast, Russia. Population: 10,500 (2010 census); 10,702 (2002 census); 9,756 (1989 Soviet census).
