= Roadheader =

Excavation equipment

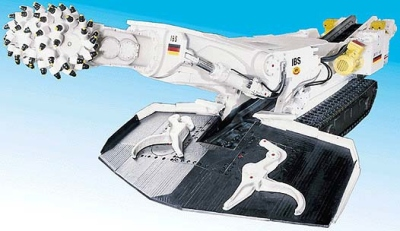
A typical roadheader

A roadheader, also called a boom-type roadheader, road header machine, road header or just header machine, is a piece of excavating equipment consisting of a boom-mounted cutting head, a loading device usually involving a conveyor, and a crawler travelling track to move the entire machine forward into the rock face.

The cutting head can be a general purpose rotating drum mounted in line or perpendicular to the boom, or can be special function heads such as jackhammer-like spikes, compression fracture micro-wheel heads like those on larger tunnel boring machines, a slicer head like a gigantic chain saw for dicing up rock, or simple jaw-like buckets of traditional excavators.

Roadheaders are typically powered by electric motors, to avoid issues with carbon monoxide from diesel exhaust fumes.

== History ==
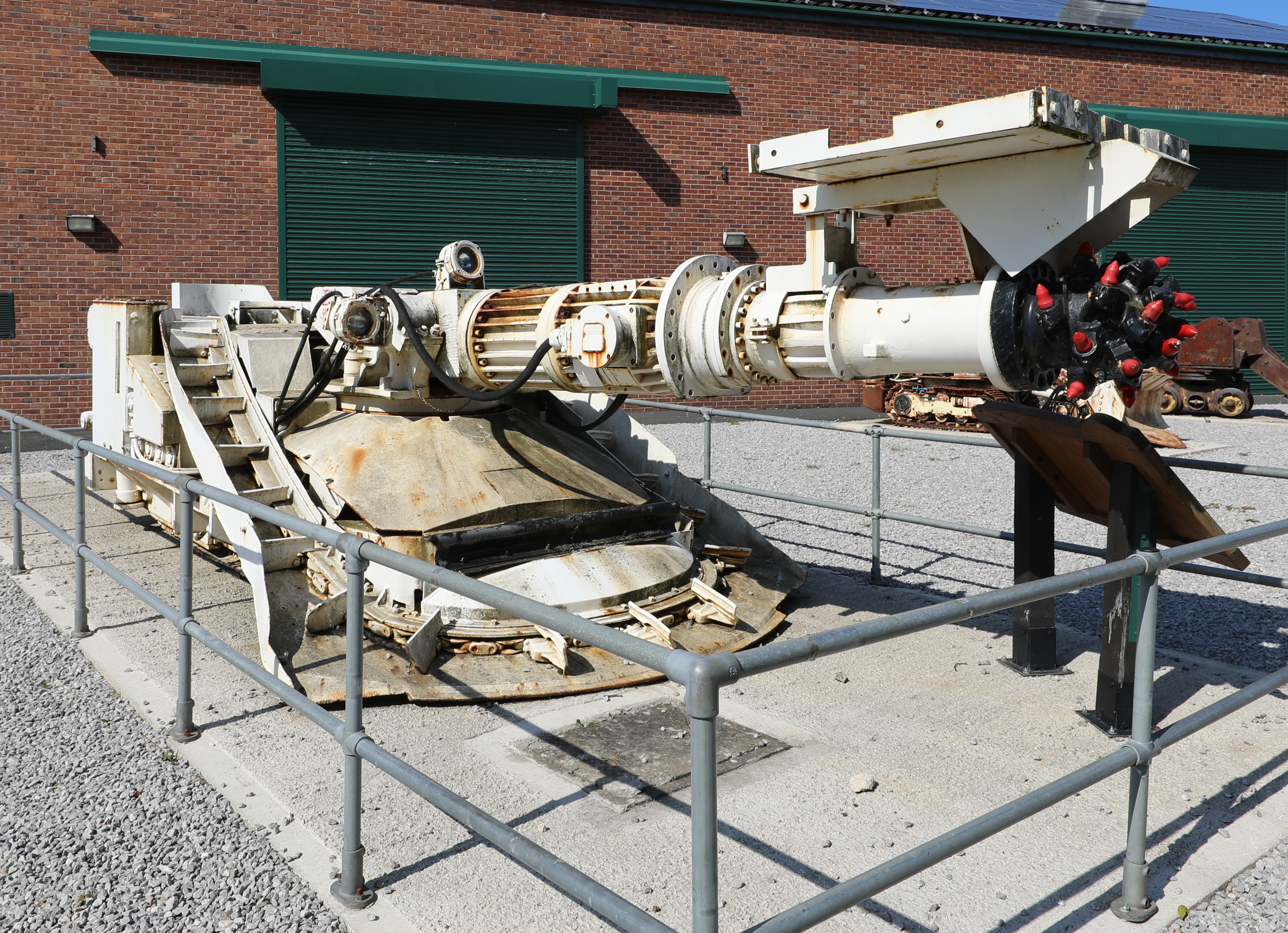
A Dosco mk2A roadheader

The first roadheader patent was applied for by Dr. Z. Ajtay in Hungary, in 1949.

== Types ==
Cutting Heads:

- Transverse - rotates parallel to the cutter boom axis
- Longitudinal - rotates perpendicular to boom axis

== Operation ==
=== Cutting cycle ===
The roadheader's excavation cycle consists of two phases: sumping and shearing. During sumping, the cutterhead is driven directly into the intact rock face without a free surface, which requires the highest cutting forces of the entire cycle. Once the boom has penetrated to the desired depth, the shearing phase begins: the boom is swept laterally and/or vertically to enlarge the opening to the full profile of the heading.

Because a free surface exists during shearing, the required forces are significantly lower. Undercutting – starting the shearing sweep from the bottom of the face upward in the direction of cutterhead rotation – is generally preferred to reduce impact loading on the picks and the boom structure.

=== Cutting tools ===
Roadheaders use drag-type picks (also known as bits or cutting tools) mounted on the cutterhead. Two main pick geometries are in common use:

- Radial (point-attack) picks – fixed in their holders; used in soft, non-abrasive materials such as coal, salt and potash, with a uniaxial compressive strength (UCS) typically up to 40–60 MPa.
- Conical (tangential-rotary) picks – mounted on a cylindrical shank that rotates freely in the holder during cutting, distributing wear evenly around the tungsten-carbide tip and extending tool life; suitable for rocks up to approximately 100–120 MPa UCS.

Rock abrasiveness is a critical factor independent of compressive strength: a rock within the acceptable UCS range can still cause rapid pick wear if its quartz content or grain size is high.

=== Rock strength applicability ===
The maximum rock strength a roadheader can excavate depends on cutterhead type and machine weight:

- Axial (longitudinal) cutterhead roadheaders are generally limited to non-abrasive massive rock up to 60–80 MPa UCS; in favorably fractured, foliated, or bedded rock masses this may extend to 80–100 MPa.
- Transverse cutterhead roadheaders can excavate non-abrasive to moderately abrasive massive rock up to 100–120 MPa UCS, and up to 160–180 MPa in well-jointed or laminated rock masses.

Rock strength values alone do not fully define cuttability; texture, abrasiveness, and discontinuity spacing all influence cutting performance, and laboratory cutting tests are recommended for proper machine selection.

=== Weight and size classes ===
Roadheaders are manufactured in a wide range of sizes to suit different excavation conditions. Depending on the model, they can excavate cross-sections typically ranging from approximately 25 to 80 m².

Installed cutterhead power ranges from around 40 kW in light machines to over 400 kW in the heaviest class, with machine weights spanning from roughly 26 tonnes up to over 100 tonnes in the largest heavy-duty units.

=== Performance ===
Roadheader performance is quantified by the instantaneous cutting rate (ICR, in m^{3}/h) and the daily advance rate (AR, in m/day). ICR is primarily a function of installed cutterhead power and the specific energy required to cut the rock. Overall shift productivity is further governed by machine utilisation time (MUT) – the fraction of the shift actually spent cutting. MUT typically ranges from 20–35% where steel arch supports are required, and from 30–50% where rock bolts and shotcrete are used.

== Uses ==
Roadheaders were initially used in coal mines. The first use in a civil engineering project was the construction of the City Loop (then called the Melbourne Underground Rail Loop) in the 1970s, where the machines enabled around 80% of the excavation to be performed mechanically.

They are now widely used in such as tunneling both for mining and municipal government projects, building wine caves, and building cave homes such as those in Coober Pedy, Australia.

On February 21, 2014, Waller Street, just south of Laurier Avenue collapsed into an 8m-wide and 12m-deep sink-hole where a roadheader was excavating the eastern entrance to Ottawa's LRT O-Train tunnel. A similar incident occurred in June 2016, when a sink-hole opened up in Rideau Street during further construction of the tunnel, and filled with water up to a depth of three metres. The CBC reported that one of Rideau Transit Group's 135-tonne roadheaders was in a part of the tunnel where the flooding was the deepest. Three roadheaders were used in the construction of the O-Train.

== Projects utilizing roadheaders ==
- Boston's Big Dig
- Ground Zero Cleanup
- Addison Airport Toll Tunnel
- Fourth bore of Caldecott Tunnel
- Malmö City Tunnel
- O-Train Line 1, Ottawa
