= Oktyabrsky District, Chelyabinsk Oblast =

Oktyabrsky District Октябрьский район (Russian)
- District
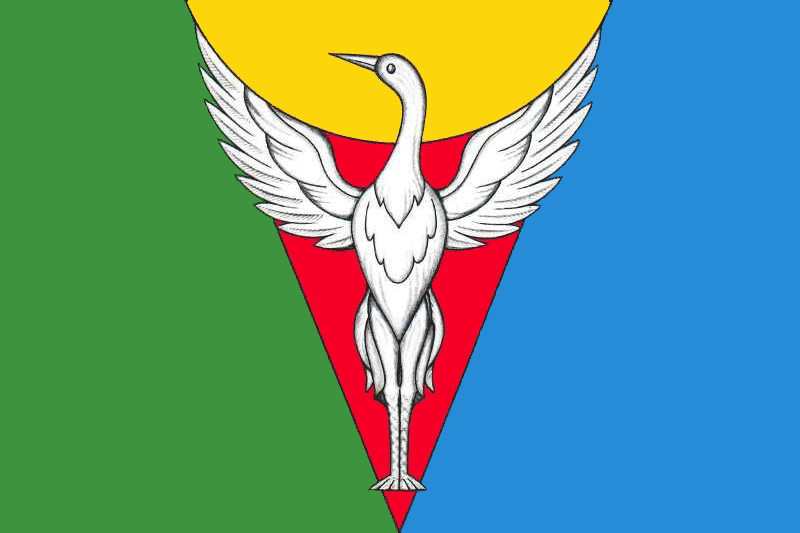
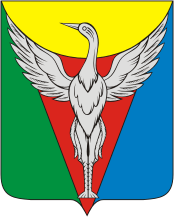
- Flag Coat of arms
- Location of Oktyabrsky District in Chelyabinsk Oblast
- Coordinates: 54°24′47″N 62°43′35″E
- Country: Russia
- Federal subject: Chelyabinsk Oblast
- Administrative center: Oktyabrskoye

Area
  - Total: 4,356 km^{2} (1,682 sq mi)

Population (2010 Census)
  - Total: 21,097
  - Density: 4.843/km^{2} (12.54/sq mi)
  - Urban: 0%
  - Rural: 100%

Administrative structure
  - Administrative divisions: 13 selsoviet
  - Inhabited localities: 53 rural localities

Municipal structure
  - Municipally incorporated as: Oktyabrsky Municipal District
  - Municipal divisions: 0 urban settlements, 13 rural settlements
- Time zone: UTC+5 (MSK+2)
- OKTMO ID: 75647000
- Website: http://okt74.ru/

Oktyabrsky District (Russian: Октя́брьский райо́н) is an administrative and municipal district (raion), one of the twenty-seven in Chelyabinsk Oblast, Russia. It is located in the east of the oblast. The area of the district is 4,356 square kilometers (1,682 sq mi). Its administrative center is the rural locality (a selo) of Oktyabrskoye. Population: 21,097 (2010 Census); 28,245 (2002 Census); 30,050 (1989 Soviet census). The population of Oktyabrskoye accounts for 32.1% of the district's total population.
