= Kopeysk =

City in Chelyabinsk Oblast, Russia

Kopeysk Копейск
- City
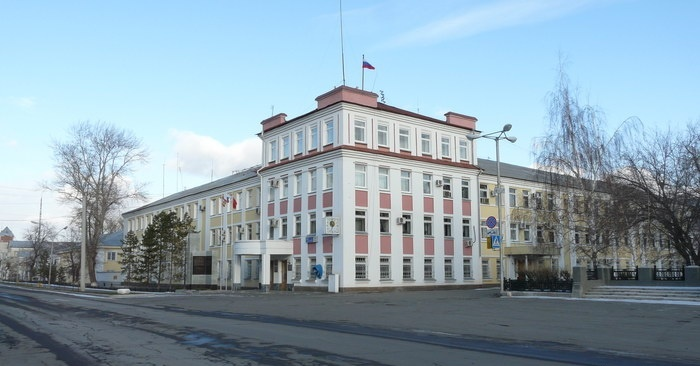
- Administration Building, Kopeysk

- Flag Coat of arms
- Interactive map of Kopeysk
- Location of Kopeysk Kopeysk (Chelyabinsk Oblast)
- Coordinates: 55°06′N 61°37′E
- Country: Russia
- Federal subject: Chelyabinsk Oblast
- Founded: 1907
- City status since: 1933

Government
  - Body: Assembly of Deputies

Area
  - Total: 236.71 km^{2} (91.39 sq mi)
- Elevation: 200 m (660 ft)

Population (2010 Census)
  - Total: 137,601
  - Estimate (2025): 143,751 (+4.5%)
  - Rank: 123rd in 2010
  - Density: 581.31/km^{2} (1,505.6/sq mi)

Administrative status
  - Subordinated to: City of Kopeysk
  - Capital of: City of Kopeysk

Municipal status
  - Urban okrug: Kopeysky Urban Okrug
  - Capital of: Kopeysky Urban Okrug
- Time zone: UTC+5 (MSK+2)
- Postal codes: 456600—456602, 456604, 456607, 456609, 456610, 456612, 456614, 456617—456623, 456625, 456629, 456652—456659
- Dialing code: +7 35139
- OKTMO ID: 75728000001
- Website: www.kopeysk-okrug.ru

Kopeysk (Russian: Копе́йск) is a city in Chelyabinsk Oblast, Russia, located southeast of Chelyabinsk. Population: 147,806 (2021 census); 137,601 (2010 census); 73,342 (2002 census); 79,048 (1989 Soviet census). The population growth between 2002 and 2010 was caused by the annexation of surrounding settlements.

== History ==
Prior to 1928, this city was called Ugolnye Kopi, meaning coal mines (hence the pick on the city's coat of arms). The element "Ugolnye" was removed and the suffix "-sk" was added to indicate the locative.

== Economy ==
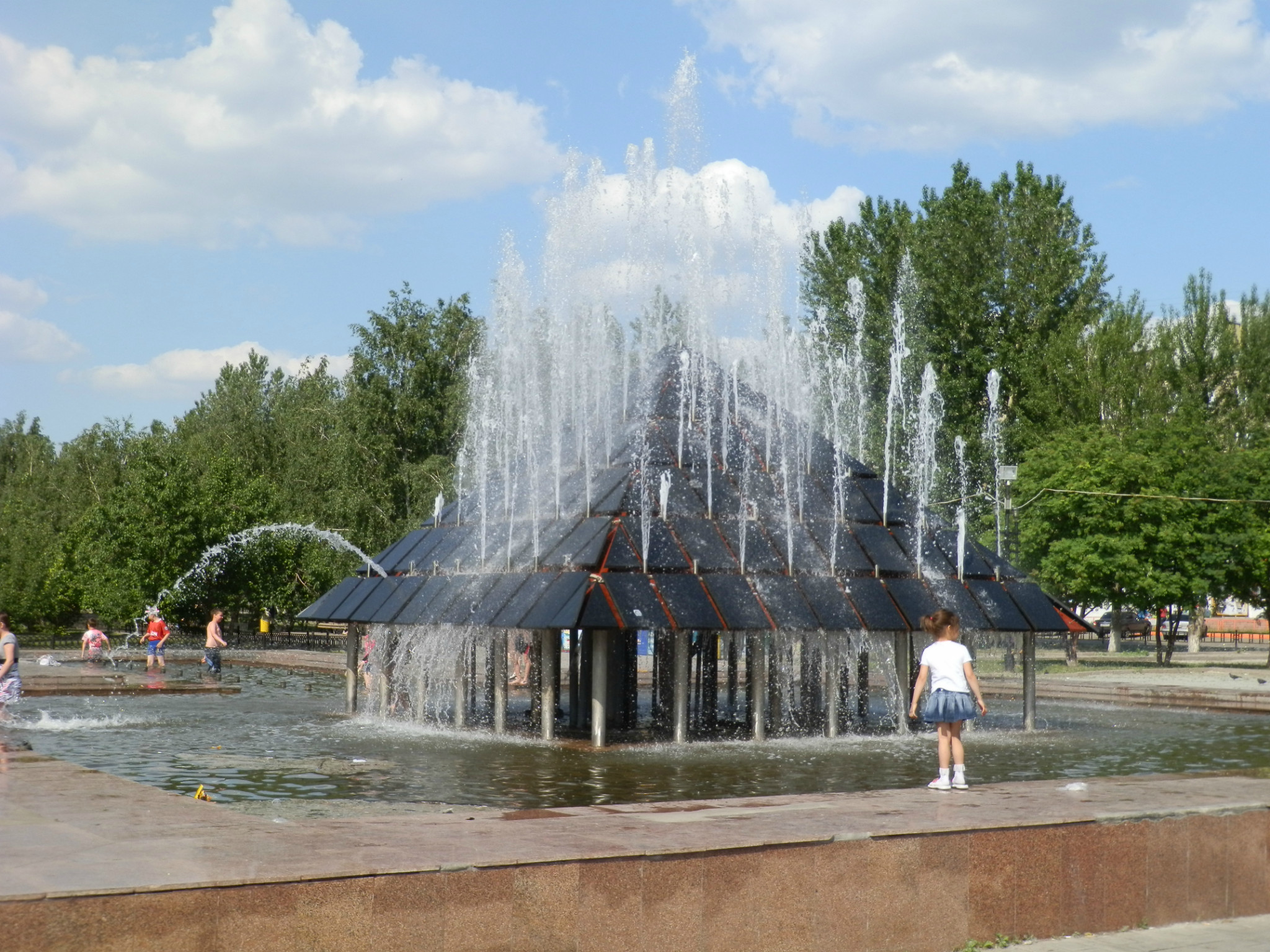
Fountain in the square of Labor Glory

Until the 1990s the main economic sectors were Coal (with mines such as "Capital", Currently, all the mines are closed due to the low quality of the coal and the high costs of production. "Komsomolskaya", "Red Gornyachka", and "Central") and mechanical engineering – Kopeysk Machine-Building plant headquarter, the largest producer of coal and salt mining equipment in Russia, is located in this city. In recent years Kopejsk has developed a diversified economy. The city recorded more than 1,000 industrial enterprises and more than 7,000 private entrepreneurs. Existing companies produce goods such as plastic film, pipes with anticorrosive coating, ceramic proppant for the oil and gas industries, and vegetable oils.

Housing is being constructed, for example in the satellite city of Chelyabinsk.

== Administrative structure ==
Within the administrative-territorial framework of the Chelyabinsk Region, Kopeysk is a city of regional importance, to which three rural settlements are subordinate. Within the context of local government, it constitutes the Kopeysky Urban District, which, in addition to the city, includes three rural localities: the villages of Kalachevo, Zaozerny and Sineglazovo. The city is divided into seven territorial departments, with one more territorial department being organized in the rural settlements that are subordinate to the city (the Kalachevsky district). In total, there are eight territorial departments that are part of the administration of Kopeysk's city district:

- Oktyabrsky territorial department
- Potaninsky territorial department
- Railway (Zheleznodorozhny) territorial department
- Vakhrushevsky territorial department
- Starokamyshinsky territorial department
- Kalachevsky territorial department
- Mining (Gornyatsky) territorial department
- Bazhovsky territorial department.

For many years, there has been discussion about joining the city of Kopeysk and later the Kopeysky urban district to become part of the Chelyabinsk (Chelyabinsk City District). The Chelyabinsk media reports that the majority of the population allegedly supports this initiative and is willing to vote in favor of it in a referendum. However, the heads and employees of municipal authorities have been categorically opposed due to fear of losing their homes. Pressure is being exerted on municipal institutions and companies with the requirement to cease supporting this initiative.

=== Localities of the city ===
The city of Kopeysk incorporates previously existing settlements:

- Bazhovo settlement,
- Gornyak settlement,
- Railway (Zheleznodorozhny) settlement,
- Kadrovik settlement,
- Potanino settlement,
- Newly-built (Novostroyka) settlement,
- Starokamyshinsk settlement,
- Tugaykul Mechanical-repair plant (Remontno-Mechanichesky Zavod - RMZ) settlement,
- Central-mine settlement No. 201,
- Suspicious (Podozyornaya) mine settlement No. 50,
- North (Severnaya) mine settlement No. 205,
- Vakhrushevo settlement,
- Kozyrevo settlement,
- The northern mine (Severnyy Rudnik) settlement,
- Sovetov settlement,
- the village of Mines (Shakhty) No. 44,
- the village of Oktyabrskiy,
- the village of the Second Site (Vtoroy uchastok),
- the village of the Fourth Site (Chetvyortyy uchastok),
- the village of Zuyevka,
- the village of Kirzavod.

== Notable people ==
- Sergey Kovalev (born 1983), Russian professional boxer
- Timur Morgunov (born 1996), Russian pole vaulter
- Sergei Ushakov (born 1965), Russian professional football coach and former player
