= Uysky District =

Uysky District Уйский район (Russian)
- District
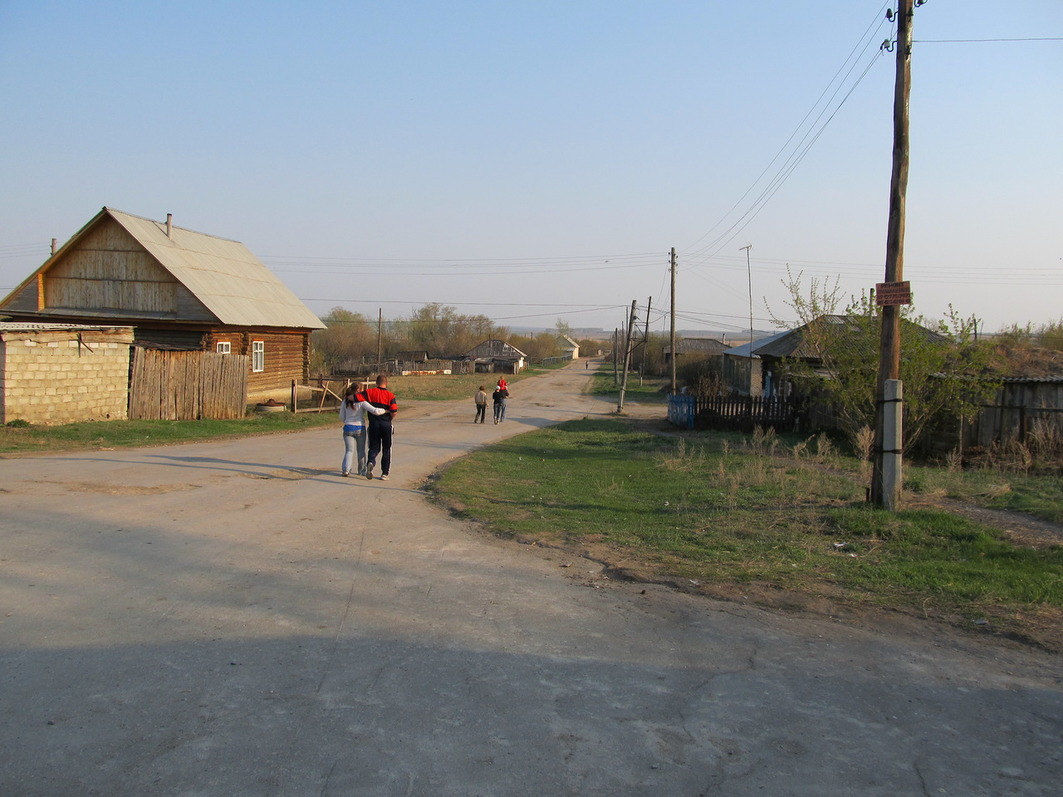
- Street in selo Kidysh

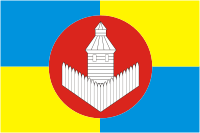
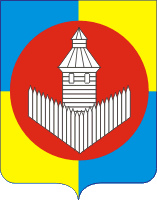
- Flag Coat of arms
- Location of Uysky District in Chelyabinsk Oblast
- Coordinates: 54°22′30″N 60°00′00″E
- Country: Russia
- Federal subject: Chelyabinsk Oblast
- Administrative center: Uyskoye

Area
  - Total: 2,637 km^{2} (1,018 sq mi)

Population (2010 Census)
  - Total: 26,184
  - Density: 9.929/km^{2} (25.72/sq mi)
  - Urban: 0%
  - Rural: 100%

Administrative structure
  - Administrative divisions: 11 selsoviet
  - Inhabited localities: 43 rural localities

Municipal structure
  - Municipally incorporated as: Uysky Municipal District
  - Municipal divisions: 0 urban settlements, 11 rural settlements
- Time zone: UTC+5 (MSK+2)
- OKTMO ID: 75656000
- Website: http://уйский-район.рф/

Uysky District (Russian: Уйский район) is an administrative and municipal district (raion), one of the twenty-seven in Chelyabinsk Oblast, Russia. It is located in the west of the oblast. The area of the district is 2,637 square kilometers (1,018 sq mi). Its administrative center is the rural locality (a selo) of Uyskoye. Population: 26,184 (2010 census); 28,555 (2002 Census); 29,132 (1989 Soviet census). The population of Uyskoye accounts for 28.1% of the district's total population.
