= Plast (town) =

Plast Пласт
- Town
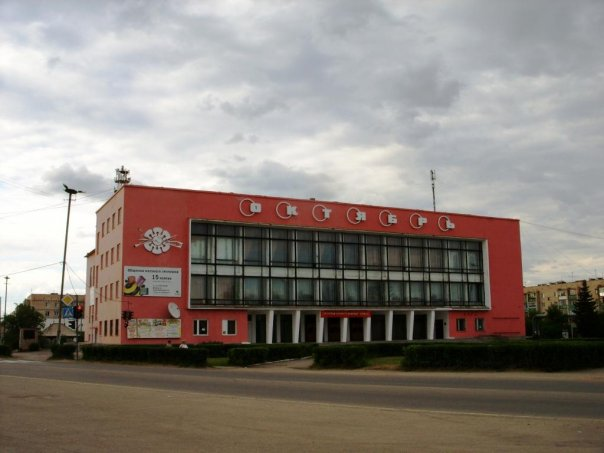
- Palace of Culture in Plast

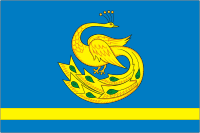
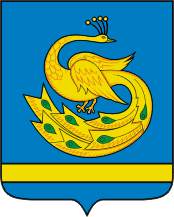
- Flag Coat of arms
- Interactive map of Plast
- Location of Plast Plast (Chelyabinsk Oblast)
- Coordinates: 54°23′N 60°49′E
- Country: Russia
- Federal subject: Chelyabinsk Oblast
- Administrative district: Plastovsky District
- TownSelsoviet: Plast
- Founded: mid-19th century
- Town status since: October 7, 1940
- Elevation: 300 m (980 ft)

Population (2010 Census)
  - Total: 17,342
  - Estimate (2023): 18,243 (+5.2%)

Administrative status
  - Capital of: Plastovsky District, Town of Plast

Municipal status
  - Municipal district: Plastovsky Municipal District
  - Urban settlement: Plastovskoye Urban Settlement
  - Capital of: Plastovsky Municipal District, Plastovskoye Urban Settlement
- Time zone: UTC+5 (MSK+2)
- Postal codes: 457020–457022, 457024
- OKTMO ID: 75648101001
- Website: plastgp.ru

Plast (Russian: Пласт) is a town and the administrative center of Plastovsky District in Chelyabinsk Oblast, Russia. It is located on the eastern slopes of the Ural Mountains in the upper basin of the oblast's Uy River, 127 kilometers (79 mi) southwest of Chelyabinsk, the administrative center. Population: 17,342 (2010 census); 17,422 (2002 census); 18,880 (1989 Soviet census).

== History ==
It was founded as a gold mine in the mid-19th century. Town status was granted on October 7, 1940.

== Status ==
Within the framework of administrative divisions, Plast serves as the administrative center of Plastovsky District. As an administrative division, it is, together with the khutor of Pchelnik, incorporated within Plastovsky District as the Town of Plast. As a municipal division, the Town of Plast is incorporated within Plastovsky Municipal District as Plastovskoye Urban Settlement.

== Climate ==
Plast offers a temperate continental climate. July is the warmest month; its average temperature is 19.2 °C. The coldest month is January with an average temperature of -16.5 °C. The average annual rainfall is 445 mm.

== Sport ==
Bandy is the popular sport. Local team Metallurg participated in 2015 in the championship for Chelyabinsk Oblast for boys born 2000–02.

=== Stadium "Trud" ===
Stadium "Trud" is the central sports facility. It includes a football field, a basketball court, a gym, a playground, an ice rink and tribunes. All sports events are hosted there. One of the most popular activities is football. Its stage hosted Nikolai Baskov on City Day in 2019.

== Landmarks ==
The town center hosts a monument to the prospector, who, according to the creators, immortalized the history of creation and the name of the city. It is dedicated to the discoverers of the Kochkarsky gold deposit, its first prospectors and geologists. The monument opened in 2014. It was sculpted by A.V. Ryabov and K.A. Gelev. Alexander Ryabov created the image of a prospector from old photographs.

In 2016, a monument to Peter and Fevronia of Murom was erected. The monument is a popular wedding venue. The newlyweds ask the saints to make their marriage happy.

A sculptural composition of St. Barbara the Great Martyr is at the top of the city. The Christian martyr is considered the protector of sudden and violent death. Saint Barbara received grace from God to deliver from death of everyone who remembers her martyrdom. She is also considered the patroness of miners. Mothers and wives pray for her intercession, and the miners turn to her in difficult times.
