= Uvelsky District =

Uvelsky District Увельский район (Russian)
- District
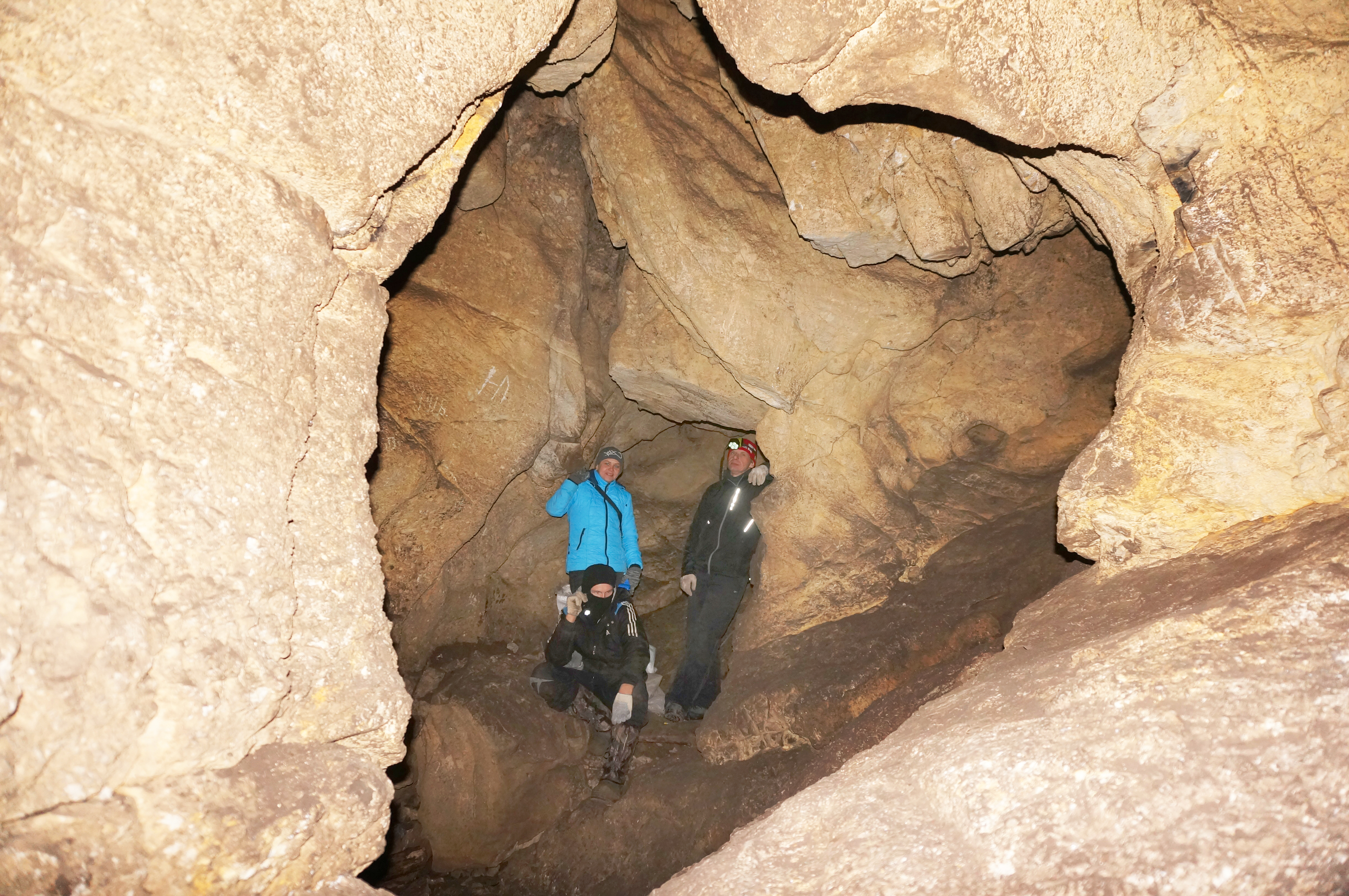
- Zhemeryaksky cave, Uvelsky District

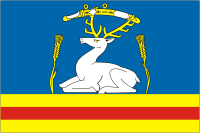
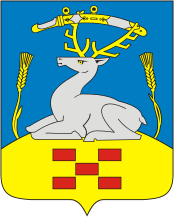
- Flag Coat of arms
- Location of Uvelsky District in Chelyabinsk Oblast
- Coordinates: 54°26′N 61°21′E
- Country: Russia
- Federal subject: Chelyabinsk Oblast
- Established: 24 May 1924
- Administrative center: Uvelsky

Area
  - Total: 2,330 km^{2} (900 sq mi)

Population (2010 Census)
  - Total: 31,867
  - Density: 13.7/km^{2} (35.4/sq mi)
  - Urban: 0%
  - Rural: 100%

Administrative structure
  - Administrative divisions: 10 selsoviet
  - Inhabited localities: 41 rural localities

Municipal structure
  - Municipally incorporated as: Uvelsky Municipal District
  - Municipal divisions: 0 urban settlements, 10 rural settlements
- Time zone: UTC+5 (MSK+2)
- OKTMO ID: 75655000
- Website: http://www.admuvelka.ru/

Uvelsky District (Russian: Уве́льский райо́н) is an administrative and municipal district (raion), one of the twenty-seven in Chelyabinsk Oblast, Russia. It is located in the eastern central part of the oblast. The area of the district is 2,330 square kilometers (900 sq mi). Its administrative center is the rural locality (a settlement) of Uvelsky. Population: 31,867 (2010 census); 32,188 (2002 Census); 29,513 (1989 Soviet census). The population of the administrative center accounts for 33.0% of the district's total population.
