= Magnitogorsk constituency =

Magnitogorsk single-member constituency
- Constituency of the Russian State Duma
- Deputy: Vladimir Dremov; United Russia
- Federal subject: Chelyabinsk Oblast
- Districts: Agapovsky, Bredinsky, Chesmensky, Kartalinsky, Kizilsky, Lokomotivny, Magnitogorsk, Nagaybaksky, Troitsk, Troitsky, Varnensky, Verkhneuralsky
- Voters: 530,577 (2026)

The Magnitogorsk constituency (No.191 (Note: No.185 in 1993–2007, No.192 in 2016–2026)) is a Russian legislative constituency in Chelyabinsk Oblast. The constituency covers southern Chelyabinsk Oblast, including a major industrial city Magnitogorsk.

The constituency has been represented since 2026 by United Russia deputy Vladimir Dremov, former Member of Legislative Assembly of Chelyabinsk Oblast and Magnitogorsk Iron and Steel Works executive, who won the open seat, succeeding two-term United Russia incumbent Vitaly Bakhmetyev.

== Boundaries ==
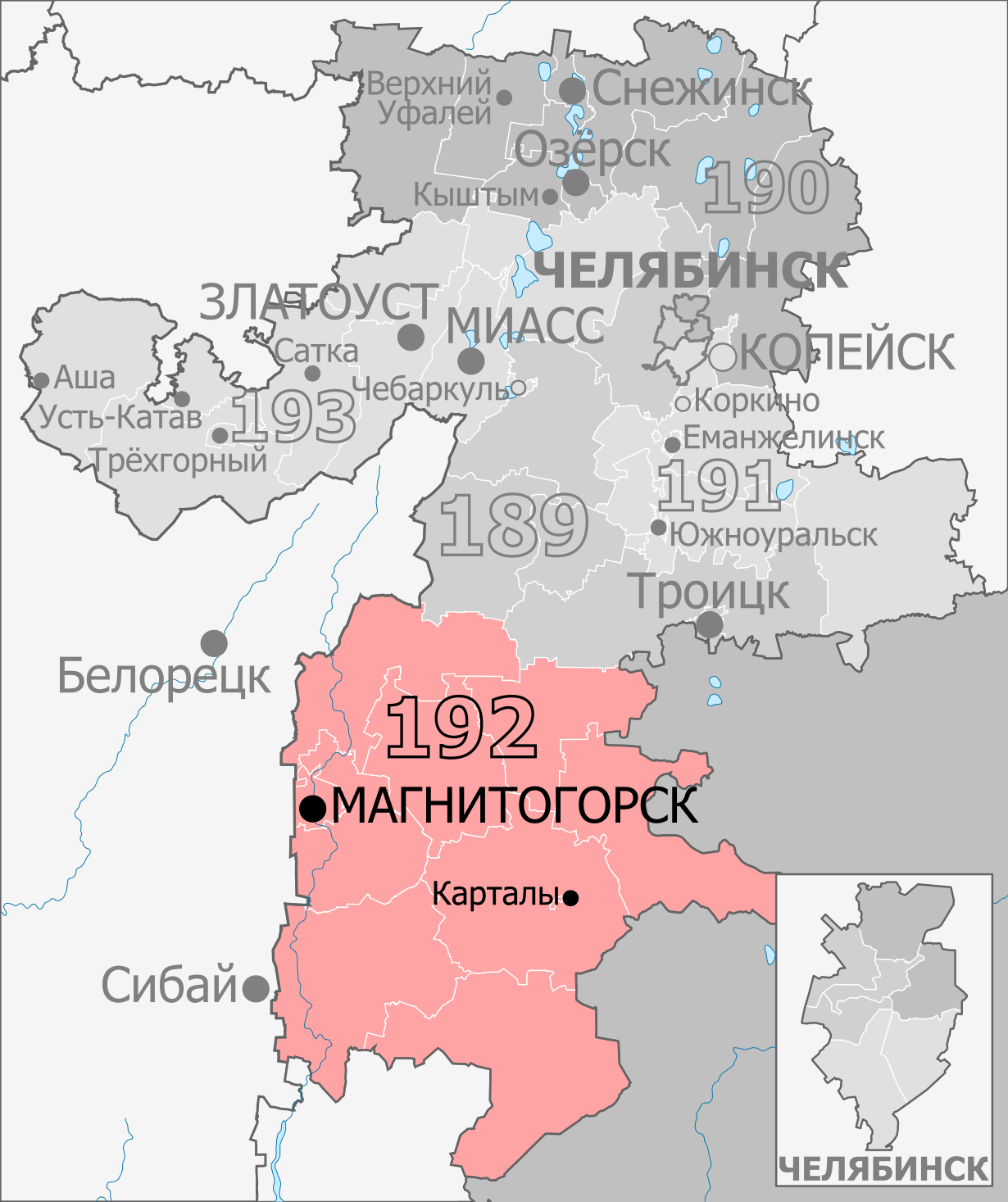
Constituency boundaries from 2016 to 2026

1993–2007, 2016–2026: Agapovsky District, Bredinsky District, Chesmensky District, Kartalinsky District, Kizilsky District, Lokomotivny, Magnitogorsk, Nagaybaksky District, Varnensky District, Verkhneuralsky District
The constituency covered southern Chelyabinsk Oblast, including a major industrial city Magnitogorsk. This seat did not exist between 2007 and 2016 as State Duma was elected only through proportional representation.

2026–present: Agapovsky District, Bredinsky District, Chesmensky District, Kartalinsky District, Kizilsky District, Lokomotivny, Magnitogorsk, Nagaybaksky District, Troitsk, Troitsky District, Varnensky District, Verkhneuralsky District
After the 2025 redistricting the constituency was altered, gaining Troitsk and Troitsky District from Chelyabinsk constituency.

== Members elected ==
Election	Member	Party
1993	Aleksandr Pochinok (Note: appointed Head of the State Taxation Service in April 1997)	Choice of Russia
1995	Aleksandr Pochinok	Democratic Choice of Russia – United Democrats
1997	Aleksandr Chershintsev	Independent
1999	Aleksandr Chershintsev	Independent
2003	Pavel Krasheninnikov	Union of Right Forces
2007	Proportional representation - no election by constituency	
2011	Proportional representation - no election by constituency	
2016	Vitaly Bakhmetyev	United Russia
2021	Vitaly Bakhmetyev	United Russia
2026	Vladimir Dremov	United Russia

== Election results ==
=== 1993 ===
Summary of the 12 December 1993 Russian legislative election in the Magnitogorsk constituency
Candidate	Party	Votes	%
Aleksandr Pochinok	Choice of Russia	138,905	50.54%
Aleksandr Smirnov	Independent	42,398	15.43%
Gennady Grabarev	Independent	29,154	10.61%
Viktor Seroshtanov	Yavlinsky–Boldyrev–Lukin	27,887	10.15%
Total		274,854	100%

=== 1995 ===
Summary of the 17 December 1995 Russian legislative election in the Magnitogorsk constituency
Candidate	Party	Votes	%
Aleksandr Pochinok (incumbent)	Democratic Choice of Russia – United Democrats	131,641	40.55%
Aleksandr Zaplatin	Independent	53,663	16.53%
Zoya Pronina	Communist Party	34,553	10.64%
Grigory Petukhov	Agrarian Party	28,251	8.70%
Dinus Safiullin	Independent	27,825	8.57%
Gennady Monetov	Independent	18,787	5.79%
against all		24,453	7.53%
Total		324,610	100%

=== 1997 ===
Summary of the 14 December 1997 by-election in the Magnitogorsk constituency
Candidate	Party	Votes	%
Aleksandr Chershintsev	Independent	92,338	55.89%
Aleksandr Dobchinsky	Independent	27,176	16.45%
Viktor Barabanov	Independent	13,060	7.90%
Valentin Romanenkov	Independent	7,144	4.32%
Gennady Yermakov	Independent	4,238	2.57%
Iosif Abramov	Independent	2,520	1.53%
against all		12,617	7.64%
Total		165,212	100%
Eligible voters/turnout		511,628	32.29%

=== 1999 ===
Summary of the 19 December 1999 Russian legislative election in the Magnitogorsk constituency
Candidate	Party	Votes	%
Aleksandr Chershintsev (incumbent)	Independent	117,998	38.65%
Pavel Krasheninnikov	Union of Right Forces	95,250	31.20%
Aleksandr Dobchinsky	Independent	26,379	8.64%
Aleksandr Smirnov	Independent	14,701	4.81%
Zhakslyk Altynbayev	Our Home – Russia	12,417	4.07%
Gennady Yermakov	Liberal Democratic Party	3,904	1.28%
Irina Belyakova	Spiritual Heritage	3,549	1.16%
Anton Kruglyashev	Peace, Labour, May	2,911	0.95%
Iosif Abramov	Independent	1,932	0.63%
against all		20,315	6.65%
Total		305,318	100%

=== 2003 ===
Summary of the 7 December 2003 Russian legislative election in the Magnitogorsk constituency
Candidate	Party	Votes	%
Pavel Krasheninnikov	Union of Right Forces	139,632	48.45%
Aleksandr Chershintsev (incumbent)	United Russia	37,361	12.96%
Zoya Pronina	Communist Party	19,575	6.79%
Vladimir Dubrovsky	Russian Pensioners' Party-Party of Social Justice	18,607	6.46%
Vladimir Glukhovsky	Independent	12,009	4.17%
Aleksey Garayev	Agrarian Party	11,538	4.00%
Valery Levandovsky	Independent	10,010	3.47%
Yury Chetyrkin	Independent	3,391	1.18%
Dmitry Soldatkin	Independent	1,981	0.69%
against all		28,868	10.02%
Total		288,464	100%

=== 2016 ===
Summary of the 18 September 2016 Russian legislative election in the Magnitogorsk constituency
Candidate	Party	Votes	%
Vitaly Bakhmetyev	United Russia	123,851	49.04%
Olga Mukhometyarova	A Just Russia	37,540	14.86%
Nikolay Fedorov	Liberal Democratic Party	24,567	9.73%
Igor Yegorov	Communist Party	18,403	7.29%
Aleksey Garayev	Party of Growth	12,393	4.91%
Olga Korda	Rodina	11,032	4.37%
Nikolay Drozdov	Communists of Russia	10,196	4.04%
Sergey Shichkov	Yabloko	3,811	1.51%
Total		252,554	100%

=== 2021 ===
Summary of the 17-19 September 2021 Russian legislative election in the Magnitogorsk constituency
Candidate	Party	Votes	%
Vitaly Bakhmetyev (incumbent)	United Russia	99,156	40.63%
Elmar Rustamov	Communist Party	24,936	10.22%
Pavel Vladelshchikov	A Just Russia — For Truth	23,624	9.68%
Damir Baytenov	Liberal Democratic Party	23,410	9.59%
Tatyana Mararash	New People	17,228	7.06%
Maksim Stepanov	Communists of Russia	16,845	6.90%
Aleksandr Ishimov	Party of Pensioners	13,695	5.61%
Sergey Toropov	Russian Party of Freedom and Justice	6,823	2.80%
Vasily German	Rodina	4,321	1.77%
Nikolay Koshman	Yabloko	2,871	1.18%
Total		244,030	100%

=== 2026 ===
Summary of the 18-20 September 2026 Russian legislative election in the Magnitogorsk constituency
Candidate	Party	Votes	%
Vladimir Dremov	United Russia	154,115	47.53%
Yekaterina Sisina	Communist Party	45,002	13.88%
Arkady Agapov	A Just Russia	35,269	10.88%
Artur Kagarmanov	New People	30,281	9.34%
Aleksey Besedin	Liberal Democratic Party	27,907	8.61%
Aleksey Frolov	Party of Pensioners	12,513	3.86%
Anton Anufriyev	The Greens	8,832	2.72%
Total		324,265	100%
