= Andrey Filatov (engineer) =

Soviet metallurgical engineer and industrial manager (1912–1973)

Andrey Dmitrievich Filatov
- Андрей Дмитриевич Филатов
- Born: 19 August 1912; Kharkov, Kharkov Governorate, Russian Empire
- Died: 6 June 1973 (aged 60); Moscow, Russian SFSR, Soviet Union
- Resting place: Pravoberezhny Cemetery, Magnitogorsk
- Occupations: Metallurgical engineer, industrial manager
- Known for: Director of Magnitogorsk Metallurgical Combine (1968–1973)
- Political party: Communist Party of the Soviet Union (from 1950)
- Awards: Hero of Socialist Labour; State Prize of the USSR; 2× Order of Lenin; Order of the Red Banner of Labour; 2× Order of the Badge of Honour; Medal "For Labour Valour"

Andrey Dmitrievich Filatov (Russian: Андрей Дмитриевич Филатов; 19 August 1912 – 6 June 1973) was a Soviet metallurgical engineer and industrial manager. He served as the eleventh director of the Magnitogorsk Metallurgical Combine (MMK), the largest metallurgical enterprise in the Soviet Union, from March 1968 until his death in 1973. He received the title of Hero of Socialist Labour in 1971 and was a laureate of the State Prize of the USSR (1969).

== Early life and education ==
Filatov was born on 19 August 1912 in Kharkov (now Kharkiv, Ukraine) into a working-class family. He spent part of his childhood in the Belgorod region and completed six classes of a seven-year school before responding to a Komsomol call to move to the industrial center of Magnitogorsk in 1930.

Upon arrival, Filatov enrolled in the factory-and-plant apprenticeship school (школа фабрично-заводского ученичества, FZU) affiliated with MMK, which was then located in Verkhneuralsk. He graduated in 1931 with a specialization as an operator in coke-chemical production and immediately began work at the combine. While working, he continued his education, graduating in 1944 from the evening department of the Magnitogorsk Mining and Metallurgical Institute (now part of Magnitogorsk State Technical University) with a diploma as an engineer-metallurgist.

== Career ==
Filatov's career at MMK spanned more than four decades, beginning with manual labor and culminating in the directorship of the largest metallurgical enterprise in the Soviet Union.

=== Early career (1931–1960) ===
Filatov began his career in 1931 working as a bricklayer during the construction of coke ovens and subsequently as an assistant roller in rolling operations. He spent time working in the coke-chemical production department before transferring to the rolling shop. After completing technical courses at an evening technical school, he became a foreman.

=== Political and educational maturation ===
According to historian Stephen Kotkin, Filatov's early years at Magnitogorsk served as a public example of the Soviet drive for self-improvement. Filatov, who arrived in 1931, described himself as initially "illiterate," stating that he had to complete a literacy circle before he could advance to technical training. He later recalled his progress: "Now I read, write, and solve problems... and I'm learning the ins-and-outs of blueprints."

During the political purges of the mid-1930s, Filatov's career faced a setback when he was demoted from full party membership to candidate status on the grounds of "political illiteracy." A February 1936 article in the local newspaper Magnitogorskii Rabochii, titled "How the Communist Filatov matured," cited him as a model for how to respond to party discipline. The newspaper reported that after his demotion, Filatov "came to the proper conclusion" by enrolling in evening party school and a study circle on party history. He was praised for having "seriously matured" politically and was reportedly reinstated to full membership status two and a half years later.

In 1938, Filatov transferred to the technical control department (OTK) of MMK, where he advanced through positions as inspector, deputy section chief, and section chief. After obtaining his engineering diploma in 1944, he moved to the wire and strip shop, where he served as head of the technical control section. He officially rejoined the CPSU in 1950 and was appointed deputy shop chief. By 1951, he had become head of the wire-strip shop.

=== Senior management (1960–1968) ===
From 1960 to 1962, Filatov served as head of the combine's production department. He was subsequently appointed chief engineer of MMK, a position he held from 1962 to 1968.

=== Director of MMK (1968–1973) ===
In March 1968, Filatov succeeded Feodosiy Voronov as director of MMK, becoming the eleventh person to lead the enterprise.

==== Expansion and modernization ====
Under Filatov's leadership, the combine undertook major expansion and modernization programs. In May 1969, the fifth sheet-rolling shop was commissioned, featuring the cold-rolling mill "2500" and associated facilities. This expansion was strategically important for the Soviet automotive industry, enabling the production of sheet metal for automobile manufacturing.

The combine also carried out extensive modernization of its steelmaking and coke production facilities, including the conversion of four open-hearth furnaces (Nos. 30, 31, 32, and 35) to two-bath units, reconstruction of six open-hearth furnaces to a single-channel configuration, reconstruction of coke batteries No. 3 and No. 4, and introduction of vacuum treatment for liquid steel.

During Filatov's tenure, the combine mastered the production of eighteen new steel grades. In May 1973, shortly before his death, the first stage of the sixth sheet-rolling shop was commissioned to produce tinplate for the food industry; the shop reached full capacity in autumn 1973. As of 2013, this facility reportedly had no equivalent in the Russian Federation.

==== Social policy ====
Filatov placed significant emphasis on expanding social infrastructure for workers. During his tenure, the combine constructed nine kindergartens and nurseries, a new hospital building for the MMK medical-sanitary unit, children's camps, a rest house, a sanatorium building in Yalta, a dairy plant, potato storage facilities, a vegetable processing shop, and fruit storage facilities.

However, his housing policy generated controversy. Filatov issued a verbal directive giving priority in housing distribution to families where both spouses were employed at MMK. This policy caused dissatisfaction among Magnitogorsk residents and led some spouses of metallurgical workers to transfer to less skilled positions at the combine in order to secure better housing.

== Political activity ==
Filatov was elected a deputy of the Supreme Soviet of the Soviet Union (8th convocation) in 1970. He became a member of the CPSU Central Committee in 1971 and was a delegate to the XXIV Congress of the CPSU.

== Personal life ==
Colleagues described Filatov as meticulous, exceptionally hardworking, and modest. He was known for speaking frankly and being argumentative in discussions, but also for respecting his opponents and readily acknowledging his own mistakes. He was noted for having a phenomenal memory.

== Death ==
In 1973, Filatov fell ill and traveled to Moscow for surgery. He died on 6 June 1973 as a result of a medical complication involving a detached thrombus. He was buried at Pravoberezhny Cemetery in Magnitogorsk.

== Awards and honours ==
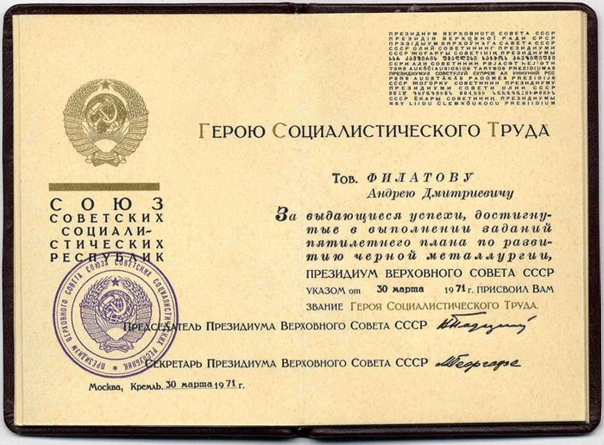
The "Hero of Socialist Labour" award for Andrey Dmitrievich Filatov

- Hero of Socialist Labour (30 March 1971) – for outstanding achievements in fulfilling the five-year plan for the development of ferrous metallurgy
- State Prize of the USSR in science and technology (1969), awarded jointly with Leonid Radyukevich (head of the fifth sheet-rolling shop) and deputy chief power engineer Khussid for creating systems for automatic regulation of strip thickness and tension on continuous cold-rolling mills
- Two Orders of Lenin (1966, 1971)
- Order of the Red Banner of Labour (1952)
- Two Orders of the Badge of Honour (1952, 1958)
- Medal "For Labour Valour" (1949)
- Jubilee Medal "In Commemoration of the 100th Anniversary of the Birth of Vladimir Ilyich Lenin"

== Legacy ==
=== Film and literature ===
In 1972, director Boris Rychkov released the documentary film Personal Responsibility (Личная ответственность), which portrayed Filatov alongside Nikolai Slyunkov, director of the Minsk Tractor Works, examining the work and personalities of directors of two major Soviet enterprises.

In 1974, the publishing house Soviet Russia released Nikolay Kartashov's book Comrade Director (Товарищ директор). In 1979, the Soviet writer Alexander Avdeenko published the novel V pote litsa svoego (В поте лица своего, literally "By the Sweat of One's Brow"), set during the period of Filatov's directorship and depicting, among other themes, his housing policy.

In 2011, Valery Kucher included a chapter on Filatov's work as director in his book Magnitka – Forever. Part 2: The Affairs and Fates of Soviet Directors (Магнитка — это навсегда. Часть 2. Дела и судьбы советских директоров).

=== Memorials ===
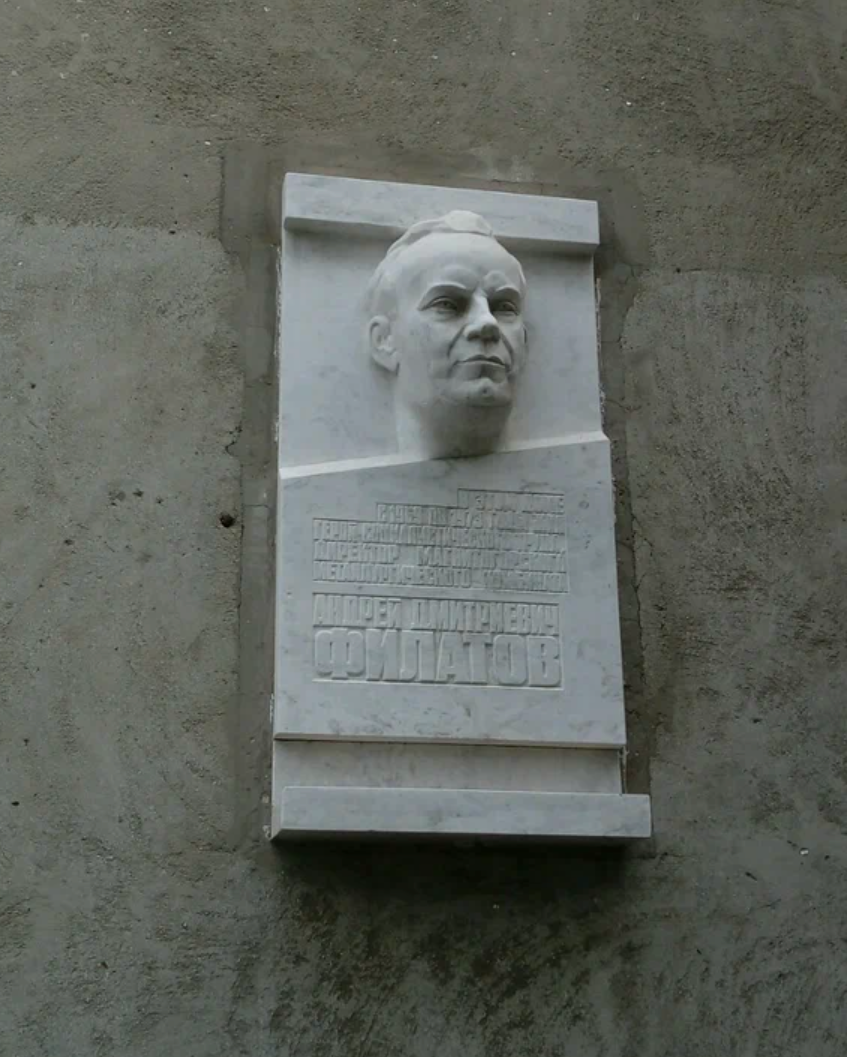
Memorial plaque to Filatov on the building where he lived on Kuibyshev Street

In October 2000, Professional Lyceum No. 13 in Magnitogorsk was named after Filatov. The institution, of which Filatov himself was a graduate, later became part of Magnitogorsk Polytechnic College. Filatov was credited with securing the institution's building at the intersection of Karl Marx Avenue and Steelworkers Street. A memorial plaque was installed there in 2006.

A memorial plaque was also installed on the building where Filatov lived on Kuibyshev Street in Magnitogorsk.
