= Vitaly Bakhmetyev =

Russian politician (born 1961)

- Виталий Бахметьев
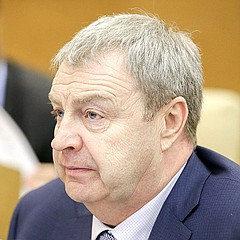

Member of the State Duma for Chelyabinsk Oblast
- Incumbent
- Assumed office 5 October 2016
- Preceded by: constituency re-established
- Constituency: Magnitogorsk (No. 192)

Mayor of Magnitogorsk
- In office 28 October 2015 – 27 September 2016
- Preceded by: Serget Berdnikov
- Succeeded by: Evgeny Teftelev

Personal details
- Born: 12 August 1961 (age 65) Magnitogorsk, Chelyabinsk Oblast, USSR
- Party: United Russia
- Education: Magnitogorsk State Technical University

Vitaly Viktorovich Bakhmetyev (Russian: Виталий Викторович Бахметьев; born 12 August 1961, Magnitogorsk, Chelyabinsk Oblast) is a Russian political figure, deputy of the 7th and 8th State Duma convocations. He was born in the family of metallurgists. Later he graduated from the Magnitogorsk State Technical University. In 1984 he started working at the Magnitogorsk Iron and Steel Works, and eight years later, he headed the metal forming and foundry workshop of the plant.

In 2005 Bakhmetyev was elected as a deputy to the Magnitogorsk City Council of the 3rd convocation, where he was allocated to the committee on budget and fiscal policies. Three years later, Bakhmetyev became the commercial director for material and technical resources of the Magnitogorsk Iron and Steel Works. In 2012, he was among the confidants of Vladimir Putin in the Russian presidential election. In 2015 Bakhmetyev was appointed the Mayor of Magnitogorsk; he left the post on 27 September 2016, as he was elected to the State Duma of the 7th convocation. He continued his service as a deputy in the 8th State Duma. He ran with the United Russia.

Head of the City of Magnitogorsk

On 28 October 2015, at a meeting of the Magnitogorsk City Council of Deputies, Vitaly Viktorovich Bakhmetyev was elected Head of the City of Magnitogorsk, receiving twenty-six votes out of thirty-one possible.

On 11 March 2016, Vitaly Bakhmetyev was registered as a participant in the primaries (preliminary voting) of the United Russia party for subsequent nomination in the elections to the State Duma of the Russian Federation. Bakhmetyev himself explained his decision by the need to introduce amendments to legislative acts in the field of housing legislation as well as municipal service.

Vitaly Bakhmetyev is married and has three children.

== Sanctions ==
He was sanctioned by the UK government in 2022 in relation to the Russo-Ukrainian War.

== Awards ==
- Medal of the Order "For Merit to the Fatherland" (2003)
- Miner's Glory Medal
