= Verkhneuralsky =

Verkhneuralsky (masculine), Verkhneuralskaya (feminine), or Verkhneuralskoye (neuter) may refer to:

- Verkhneuralsky District, a district of Chelyabinsk Oblast, Russia
- Verkhneuralskoye Urban Settlement, a municipal formation which the Town of Verkhneuralsk in Verkhneuralsky District of Chelyabinsk Oblast, Russia is incorporated as
