= Kizilsky =

Kizilsky (masculine), Kizilskaya (feminine), or Kizilskoye (neuter) may refer to:

- Kizilsky District, a district of Chelyabinsk Oblast, Russia
- Kizilskoye, a rural locality (a selo) in Kizilsky District of Chelyabinsk Oblast, Russia
