= Evgeny Konobry =

Russian ice hockey player

- Born: August 17, 1985 (age 40) Magnitogorsk, Soviet Union
- Height: 6 ft 4 in (193 cm)
- Weight: 205 lb (93 kg; 14 st 9 lb)
- Position: Goaltender
- Caught: Left
- Played for: HC Spartak Moscow
- NHL draft: Undrafted
- Playing career: 2006–2017

Evgeny Konobry (born August 17, 1985) is a former Russian professional ice hockey goaltender who played for HC Spartak Moscow of the Kontinental Hockey League (KHL).
