= Magnitogorsk State University =

Russian University

Coordinates: 53.388°N 58.9873°E

- Магнитогорский государственный университет
- Logo of the Magnitogorsk State University
- Motto: Классическое образование - гарант вашего будущего!
- Type: Public
- Active: 1 October 1932–2014
- Rector: Vladimir Semenov
- Students: 18,000
- Location: Magnitogorsk, Russia
- Campus: urban

Magnitogorsk State University (MaSU) (Russian: Магнитого́рский госуда́рственный университе́т, МаГУ, Magnitogórskiy gosudárstvennyy universitét) was a university in Magnitogorsk, Russia, founded on 1 October 1932.

In 2013–2014, it was merged into the Magnitogorsk State Technical University and ceased its existence as a separate entity.

== Academic facilities ==
MaSU claimed to be rapidly turning into a classical university. In the last 10 years Magnitogorsk University has increased teacher training in the South Ural region.

The university comprised 14 departments and 59 chairs where more than 700 teachers, more than 60% of which held the academic title of Candidates or Doctors of Sciences. The university facilities include computer and language laboratories, modern specialized laboratories, the Publishing Complex, the Sports Centre and student hostels. Nearly two dozen computer laboratories are united in a common computer network and connected to the Internet.

MaSU is a university complex comprising the University itself, the Lycee, the Department of Continuing Professional Development and Retraining, the South Ural Centre for Education System Monitoring and the Institution of Pedagogy.

== Academics ==
- 14 departments
- 59 chairs
- 55 areas and specialities of higher professional education, 21 of them - Baccalaureate
- 27 programmes for supplementary education required in the region

=== University buildings ===
The university facilities included 8 buildings, 4 hostels, and a Sports Centre.

The main University building, the Painting building, the Department of Technology building, the Department of Psychology building, the Institution of Pedagogy building, the South Ural Centre for Education System Monitoring building, the Lycee of MaSU building, the Sports Centre building.

==== Students ====
- 18,000 students of full-time and part-time courses
- over 700 students pursuing supplementary education
- over 1000 continuing professional development and retraining students
- 90% of the university graduates stay in the region. Since 2003 the number of graduates has increased from 1700 to 2634 people.

==== Educational programmes ====
Programmes for higher professional education:

- Specialization
- Undergraduate courses
- Postgraduate courses
- Preparatory courses

Programmes for supplementary education:

- Professional retraining for executives and specialists in accordance with the profile of basic educational programmes
- Refresher training for executives and specialists in accordance with the profile of basic educational programmes
- Undergraduate courses

A system for getting a second higher education at University has also been developed.

=== Teaching staff ===
Training process is provided by 664 teachers:

- 67 Doctors of sciences
- 425 Candidates of sciences
- 24 members of the Union of Artists of Russia
- 13 members of the Union of Designers
- 21 elected teachers of the public academies

=== Research ===
- Postgraduate studies and doctoral studies in 16 specialities (170 learners)
- 3 Dissertation councils (from 40 to 90 learners get the degree of Candidate or Doctor of sciences every year)
- Fundamental and applied scientific researches in 21 scientific fields

== Departments ==
=== Department of Physics-mathematics ===
Specialization (5 years)
080116.65 – Mathematical methods in economics
010501.65 – Applied mathematics and computer science
010701 – Physics
50201.65 – Mathematics with an additional courses "Computer Science"
050203.65 – Physics with an additional courses "Computer Science"

Baccalaureate (4 years)
010500.62 – Applied mathematics and computer science
050200.62 – Physics-mathematics education (profile - physics)

Chairs
- Chair of algebra and geometry
- Chair of mathematical analysis
- Chair of applied mathematics and computer facilities
- Chair of physics and its teaching methods
- Chair of mathematical methods in economics

=== Computer science Department ===
Specialization (5 years)

080801.65 – Applied computer science in economics
050202.65 – Computer science

Baccalaureate (4 years)
080700.62 – Business and computer science

Chairs
- Chair of computer science
- Chair of information system
- Chair of information technologies
- Chair of applied computer science.

=== Department of Philology ===
Specialization (5 years)

031001.65 – Philology
050301.65 – Russian language and literature
031401.65 – Cultural science
030601.65 – Journalism

Baccalaureate (4 years)

031000.62 – Philology
030600.62 – Journalism

Chairs

- Chair of general linguistics and language history
- Chair of Russian language
- Chair of journalism and speech communication
- Chair of Russian classical literature
- Chair of Russian literature of the 20th century of the name of Professor Zamansky
- Chair of the newest Russian literature
- Chair of cultural science and foreign literature

=== Department of Theoretical and Applied Interpretation ===
Specialization (5 years)

031201.65 – Theory and methods of teaching of foreign languages and cultures
031202.65 – Theoretical and applied interpretation (English, German, French languages)

Chairs

- Chair of theoretical and applied interpretation
- Chair of English language
- Chair of German language
- Chair of French language

=== Historical Department ===
Specialization (5 years)

030401.65 – History
040201.65 – Sociology

Baccalaureate (4 years)

030400.62 – History
050400.62 – Socio-economic education
040200.62 – Sociology
040300.62 – Conflictology

Chairs

- Chair of Ancient and the Middle Ages history
- Chair of new and the newest history
- Chair of history of Russia

=== Department of Preschool Education ===
Specialization (5 years)

050703.65 – Preschool pedagogy and psychology

Baccalaureate (4 years)

050700.62 – Pedagogy

Chairs

- Chair of preschool pedagogy and psychology
- Chair of physical education of preschool children
- Chair of management of education

=== Department of Social Work ===
Specialization (5 years)

040101.65 – Social work

Baccalaureate (4 years)

040100.62 – Social work

Chairs

- Chair of theory and teaching methods of social work
- Chair of social pedagogy

=== Department of Psychology ===
Specialization (5 years)

030301.65 – Psychology

Chairs

- Chair of general psychology
- Chair of social psychology
- Chair of developmental psychology and physiology

=== Department of Technology ===
Specialization (5 years)

032401.65 – Advertising
261001.65 – Materials and design
260902.65 – Design Clothing
050502.65 – Technology and business

Baccalaureate (4 years)

050500.62 – Technological education

Chairs

- Chair of general technical disciplines
- Chair of theory and teaching methods of professional education
- Chair of advertising and art design
- Chair of decorative applied technologies

=== Economics and Management Department ===
Specialization (5 years)

080507.65 – Management of enterprise

Baccalaureate (4 years)

050400.62 – Socio-economic education
080100.62 – Economics

Chairs

- Chair of business and economics
- Chair of management

=== Department of Pedagogy and Teaching Methods of Primary Education ===
Specialization (5 years)

050708.65 – Pedagogy and teaching methods of primary education
050715.65 – Speech therapy
100103.65 – Socio-cultural service and tourism
032001.65 – Documentation and documental maintenance of management

Baccalaureate (4 years)

050700.62 – Pedagogy

Chairs

- Chair of speech therapy and teaching methods of improving work
- Chair of Russian language, literature and their teaching methods
- Chair of mathematics, natural-science disciplines and their teaching methods
- Chair of pedagogy and psychology of primary education

=== Department of the Fine Arts and Design ===
Specialization (5 years)

050602.65 – Fine arts
070801.65 – Decorative-applied arts
070601.65 – Design
070603.65 – Interior design

Chairs

- Chair of painting
- Chair of descriptive geometry and graphics
- Chair of drawing
- Chair of theory of art education
- Chair of design
- Chair of art metal and ceramics
- Chair of suit design and art textiles

=== The Department of Refresher Training and Professional Retraining ===
The main directions: refresher training and professional retraining of the specialists, organized in different forms: refresher training courses (short courses, from 72 to 100 hours; advanced courses, from 100 to 250 hours); problem seminars, business training, professional retraining of the executives and specialists (more than 500 hours) in accordance with the profile of the University, a second higher education.

=== The Department of the Individual Specialization ===
The Department provides practical oriented specialization in psychological and pedagogical, scientific and economic directions. Annually students enrol for 18 courses (from 240 to 560 hours). Updating of courses occurs on the basis of marketing of requirements of a labour market and individual inquiries of students

The structure of the department:
- Psychological and Pedagogical Faculty
- Art and Creative Faculty
- Preparatory Courses
- Analytical and Vocational Centre
- The Centre for Employments of the Graduates

== International Cooperation ==
TEMPUS: 144853-TEMPUS-2008-FR-JPHES "Develop a framework of qualifications for the system of higher education in the Ural region"

Seventh Framework (FP7) for European Commission:
- Health
- Environment
- Socio-economic science and humanities

PIC (Participant Identification code) for the legal entity MaSU: 997334795

http://cordis.europa.eu

=== Cooperation with Outside Organizations ===
==== Universities ====
- First University of Rennes
- Centre of archaeological researches (Gerona France)
- Toronto University
- French School at Athens
- University of Mass (Italy)
- Bucharest University
- Central European University
- University of Central Arkansas
- University of Hanover

==== Other Organizations ====
- Goethe-Institute
- Computer Associates
- National Museum of Denmark
- German Academic Exchange Service (DAAD)

== Student life ==
=== Sport ===
At students' disposal there is a Sports Centre, where experienced coaches manage different sections including volleyball, basketball, skiing, judo, table tennis, weightlifting etc.

=== Amateur art, the Club of smart and cheerful students ===
MaSU offers their students an Student Palace with a stage and a auditorium for 700 seats. A ceremony of Student Innogura-tion, award ceremonies, meetings of postgraduates and New Year festivals take place here. Every year students celebrate International student's Day and compete in singing, dancing and playing musical instruments during a traditional "Student spring" festival.

=== Health, welfare ===
Students enjoy a warm and friendly atmosphere and feel calm and confident. There are traditional meetings of the rector and students every semester. Students from other towns are provided with comfortable rooms in student hostels at a lowest price. There is a branch of a student clinic for the teaching staff and students to consult experienced doctors and receive an effective medical treatment (physiotherapy, dental treatment, etc.). There are annual preventive inspections of the collective. The university provides the patients with free medicine and medical care.

=== Publishing ===
The Publishing Complex of MaSU is more than 20 years old. It was formed to have its own basis for qualified editing of scientific, educational and methodical literature. The Publishing Complex staff aim to provide competent and qualified preparation of teachers' writing for publication, observe State standards and modern requirements to registration of editing literature. The Publishing Complex consists of the publishing department, printing house and some other facilities.

=== Library ===
The library started in 1932 together with MaSU. It houses a universal collection of books and journals specific to different scientific fields and holds over 460,000 books. The Fund of rare books attracts special attention, as one of its most ancient books dates from 1596. University research works are kept here in the Research fund. Library facilities also include the Acquisition department, the Bibliographic department and 3 reading rooms for 400 places for readers. All books and journals may be searched through the electronic catalogue. There may be requested the information about the books the library has been holding since 1995. Since March 2006, there has been functioning an electronic reading room, so that the readers may get the necessary information through the Internet. You may also enjoy the interlibrary service for borrowing books from the 4 largest libraries of Russia (Russian State Library, Russian Peoples' Library, Chelyabinsk and Yekaterinburg region libraries).
