= Magnetic Mountain =

Mountain in the southern Urals, Russia

- Old name: Atach
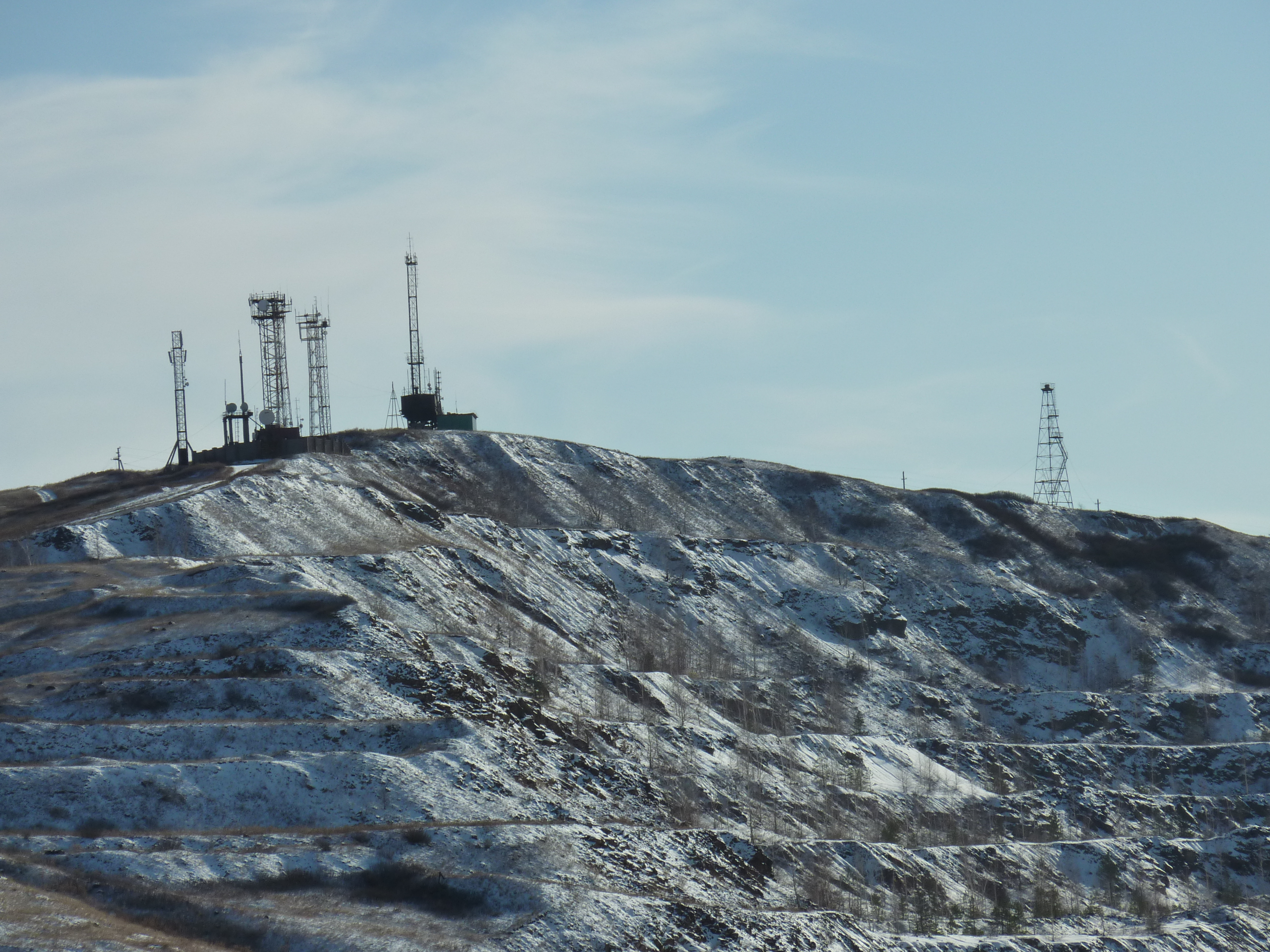

Highest point
- Elevation: 616 m (2,021 ft)
- Coordinates: 53°26′08″N 59°08′32″E

Geography
- Location: Chelyabinsk Oblast, Russia
- Parent range: Ural Mountains

Magnetic Mountain, or Magnitnaya Mountain (obsolete name Atach, in Bashkir Әtәs), is a mountain on the eastern slope of the Southern Urals on the left (Asian) bank of the Ural River. It is administratively located in the city of Magnitogorsk, Chelyabinsk Oblast.

The mountain was used as a source of raw materials (Magnitogorsk deposit of brown ironstone). Most of the mountain is now excavated. Its height is 616 m.

== History ==
In 1740, the foreman of Kubelyakskaya volost of the Nogaiskaya road, tarkhan Baim Kidraev, showed the foreman Markov and the interpreter Roman Urazlin a deposit of iron ore on the Atach mountain on the left bank of the Yaik river. The Bashkirs called the mountain "Atach" (in Bashkir Әtәs); its ore had been in use for a long time. The test gave an excellent result: from 100 pounds of raw ore ("magnetic stones") they got 75 pounds of iron. After that the mountain, named Magnitnaya, became famous during the Soviet period.

Near the mountain there was a Cossack village Magnitnaya, founded in 1743 as a fortress — a stronghold of the border and defense line of the Orenburg region. During the Soviet period, Magnitogorsk was the site of a large metallurgical plant and the city of Magnitogorsk.

== Orography ==
Magnitnaya Mountain is a group of mountains: Atach, Dalnyaya, Uzyanka (the Magnetic itself), Ezhovka and Beryozovaya. The area is approximately 25 km^{2}.

Magnitnaya is located in the band of sedimentary (limestones, sandstones) and effusive strata of Lower Carboniferous age, broken by granite, diabases and other eruptive rocks. A large magnetite deposit was formed at the contact of sedimentary and igneous rocks.

== Research ==
In 1747, ore explorers of the industrialist I. B. Tverdyshev carried out a pitting on Magnetic Mountain to determine whether there was enough ore to build an ironworks nearby.

The first professional explorers of Magnetic Mountain were E. Hoffman and G. Helmersen. (1828–29).

1854–1855. Engineers A. I. Antipov and N. G. Meglitsky made a photograph of Magnetic Mountain. The first geological map of the region was made. The map remained in manuscript form.

1875. Magnetic Mountain was studied by geologist H. A. Trautschold. The results of the study were published in a German magazine in an article "Letters from the Urals".

In 1884, the academician A. P. Karpinsky prepared and published the "Geographical Map of the Eastern Slope of the Urals", including Magnetic Mountain, based on his researches and observations of mining engineers A. A. Lesh, F. Y. Gebauer, F. P. Brusnitsyn and others. It gives a more complete picture of the geological features of Magnetic Mountain and its surroundings.

In 1895 Professor A. A. Shtukenberg, the author of "Geological Research in the Southern Urals" (Izvestiya Geologicheskogo Komiteta, vol. 15), visited the mountain. He wrote that it "represents a remarkable deposit of magnetic ironstone..."

In 1899, on the order of the Ministry of Finance the Urals was surveyed by a government commission headed by Professor D. I. Mendeleev. Mendeleev, who could not come to the Magnetic Mountain due to illness. Professor P. A. Zemyatchensky, members of the scientific commission K. N. Yegorov, S. P. Vukolov visited Magnetic Mountain. They wrote articles about Magnetic Mountain, which were published in the collection "Ural iron industry in 1899", edited by D. I. Mendeleev. Mendeleev. He also proposed several directions for the construction of a railway from Magnitnaya along the Urals to the center of Russia and Siberia. A member of the Mendeleev Commission, Professor of Mineralogy P. A. Zamyatchensky made calculations according to which even the minimum estimated reserves of ores in Magnitnaya are 1 billion poods. This was the first attempt to "weigh" the mountain.

In 1900, geologist J. A. Morozevich, together with mining engineer and topographer N. G. Mikheev, explored the Magnetic Mountain, determined ore reserves, its origin, impurities, etc. Morozevich's work "Magnetic Mountain and its immediate surroundings" was published in 1901 (Proceedings of the Geological Committee, vol. 18). Summarizing the results of the survey, I. Morozevich wrote: "The probable minimum of ore wealth of Magnetic Mountain is expressed by a round number of three billion poods." The exact number is 3146 million poods.

In 1901–1902, Magnetic Mountain and its surroundings were explored by topographers Captain Roslyakov, Lieutenant N. G. Mikheev and geologist D. V. Nikolaev.

In 1912, after drilling the first 11 boreholes and conducting new research, Professor A. N. Zavaritsky discovered 87 million tons of high quality ore.

In 1914, the mountain was explored by the engineer K. Trushkov. Extensive material about Magnitnaya is published in the book "Russia. Complete Geographical Description of our Fatherland", Volume 5, edited by P. P. Semyonov-Tianshansky, St. Petersburg, 1914.

In 1917–1918 Professors V. I. Bauman and I. M. Bakhurin carried out a magnetometer survey of the deposit, which allowed to revise the ore reserves of the Magnetic Mountain to 6-7 and even 10 billion poods.

== Iron ore mining ==
Until the 1730s, iron mining on Magnetic Mountain was carried out by Bashkirs:

"...Until the last great rebellion, the Bashkirs used to extract iron from this mountain in a very simple way, and especially excellent steel. But at the outbreak of the rebellion, in 1735, they were forbidden to go on with it...".

On December 24, 1747, in the Chancery of Orenburg Governorate, the factory worker I. B. Tverdyshev announced that he had found mines "near the Yaika River at a distance of eight versts from it, as well as from the mouth of the Upper Kizilu River at eight versts in the mountain called Atachi in three places".

Ivan Borisovich Tvyordyshev and his son-in-law and companion Ivan Semyonovich Myasnikov, relying on the provisions of the Collegium of Mining of 1719–1734 and taking advantage of the fact that the Magnetic Mountain is not registered as the property of anyone, became the first official claimants to the ore reserves of the mountain. Their "humble request" was to have the ore deposit secured for them "for all eternity".

On October 27, 1752, the Chancery of the Orenburg Governorate issued a document granting Tverdyshev and Myasnikov the right to mine ores and build factories on the Avzyan and Tirlyan rivers. Ore from the Magnetic Mountain was brought here, to the future Beloretsk Iron and Steel Works.

On November 30, 1753, by the order of the governor of Orenburg I. I. Neplyuev, the commander of the engineering corps Fyodor Menz assigned three places on the Atach mountain to Tverdyshev. Surveyors of the Orenburg province under the direction of the ensign I. D. Krasilnikov made a geographical map of the province, on which the Magnetic Fortress was marked.

In 1759 the first import of ore from the Magnetic Mountain for the Beloretsk plant, built on the Tirlyan River, began. In the summer the ore was collected on the surface and piled up in heaps, in the winter it was exported by a sledge route through the Verkhneyaitskaya fortress (now Verkhneuralsk).

== Memory ==
On May 15, 1971, the monument "40th Anniversary of the Mine" was opened on the summit of Magnetic (Uzyanka) Mountain to commemorate the 40th anniversary of the day when the first ton of ore (450 million tons) was extracted from the Magnitogorsk mine. A real artifact forms part of this monument: the bucket of the excavator with a block of Magnitogorsk ore is placed on a high rectangular pedestal welded from sheet iron. On the front side of the pedestal the plaque was reinforced, now it is missing. On the back of the pedestal there is an inscription: 40 years 1971. At the base of the monument there are two blocks of iron ore.
