= Zhloba =

Zhloba (Cyrillic: Жлоба) is an East Slavic surname. Notable people with the surname include:

- Dmitry Zhloba (1887–1938), Soviet military commander
- Nikita Zhloba (born 1995), Russian ice hockey player
