= Filatov =

Filatov (Russian: Фила́тов) is a common Russian surname. Notable people with the surname include:

- Alexander Filatov (born 1940), Russian politician
- Anatoli Filatov (born 1975), Kazakhstani ice hockey player
- Andrey Filatov (born 1971), Russian entrepreneur
- Andrey Dmitrievich Filatov (1912–1973), Russian engineer and politician
- Borys Filatov (born 1972), Ukrainian politician
- Dmitri Filatov (born 1977), Russian football player
- Irina Filatova (born 1978), Russian politician
- Leonid Filatov (1946–2003), Russian/Soviet actor, writer and director
- Nikita Filatov (born 1990), Russian ice hockey player
- Nikolai Filatov (1862–1935), Russian scientist in the field of theory of shooting
- Nil Filatov (1847–1902), Russian physician
- Pavel Filatov (1887–1956), Russian fencer
- Pyotr Filatov (1893–1941), Soviet general
- Sergey Alexandrovich Filatov (1936–2023), Russian politician
- Sergei Filatov (1926–1997), Soviet equestrian
- Tarja Filatov (born 1963), Finnish politician
- Valentin Filatov (born 1982), Russian footballer
- Valeri Filatov (born 1950), Russian/Soviet football player
- Vera Filatova (born 1982), Ukrainian actress
- Viktor Filatov, Russian journalist
- Vladimir Filatov (1875–1956), Russian-Ukrainian ophthalmologist and surgeon
- Yuri Filatov (born 1948), Ukrainian flatwater canoer
- Filatov & Karas, a Russian group
