= Agapovka =

Agapovka Агаповка
- Selo
- Interactive map of Agapovka
- Location of Agapovka Agapovka (Chelyabinsk Oblast)
- Coordinates: 53°17′57″N 59°07′53″E
- Country: Russia
- Federal subject: Chelyabinsk Oblast
- Administrative district: Agapovsky District
- SettlementSelsoviet: Agapovskoye Settlement
- Founded: 1902
- Elevation: 344 m (1,129 ft)

Population (2010 Census)
  - Total: 8,248
  - Estimate (1977): 5,494 (−33.4%)

Administrative status
  - Capital of: Agapovsky District, Agapovskoye Settlement

Municipal status
  - Municipal district: Agapovsky Municipal District
  - Rural settlement: Agapovskoye Rural Settlement
  - Capital of: Agapovsky Municipal District, Agapovskoye Rural Settlement
- Time zone: UTC+5 (MSK+2)
- Postal code: 457400
- OKTMO ID: 75603407101

Agapovka (Russian: Агаповка) is a rural locality (a selo) and the administrative center of Agapovsky District of Chelyabinsk Oblast, Russia. Population: 6,561 (2010 census); 6,408 (2002 census); 6,085 (1989 Soviet census).

== History ==
Founded in 1902 by Cossack settlers from the stanitsa (Cossack village) of Nizhneozernaya in the Orenburg Governorate, the settlement was established on the left bank of the Ural River as the khutor (hamlet) of Krasny Yar. Shortly thereafter, it was renamed Agapovsky in honor of a prominent local figure, Pavel Osipovich Agapov. Beginning in 1898, Agapov served as the head of a department within the Main Administration of Cossack Troops. By Imperial sanction, he was granted the title of honorary Cossack of the Nizhneozernaya stanitsa in 1902. From 1910 to 1917, he served as the head of the Cossack Section of the General Staff. In 1916, by a provision of the Military Council approved by the Emperor, the Arakiretskaya stanitsa of the Transbaikal Cossack Host was also renamed in honor of P. O. Agapov.

Until 1918, the village Agapovka belonged to the Yurt (cossack district) of stanitsa Magnitnaya - part of the Second Department of the Orenburg Cossack Host and was situated within the Verkhneuralsk uyezd (district) of the Orenburg Governorate. By 1912, the settlement featured a church, a mosque, a local administrative office, two shops, communal grain storehouses, a fire station, school for boys and scool for girls.. On January 29, 1915, a new church dedicated to Saint Nicholas the Wonderworker, was consecrated in Agapovka.. In the 1930s, the authorities closed the church as part of an anti-religious campaign; the church building itself has not survived. Between 1936 and 1939, many residents of the Agapovsky District were subjected to repression and executions; they were convicted under Article 58 of the Criminal Code of the USSR - specifically, sections 58-2, 58-10, and 58-11. The vast majority of those repressed were later rehabilitated by the Supreme Court of the RSFSR (in 1956 and 1959) and, in the 1990s, by the Prosecutor's Office of the Chelyabinsk Region.

By a decree of the Presidium of the Supreme Soviet of the RSFSR dated October 9, 1942, the settlements of Izvestkovy Zavod, Lisya Gora, Promstroy, and Flyusovaya were incorporated into the boundaries of the workers' settlement of Agapovka.
