= The First Tent =

Monument in Magnitogorsk, Russia

Coordinates: 53°25′33″N 58°59′52″E

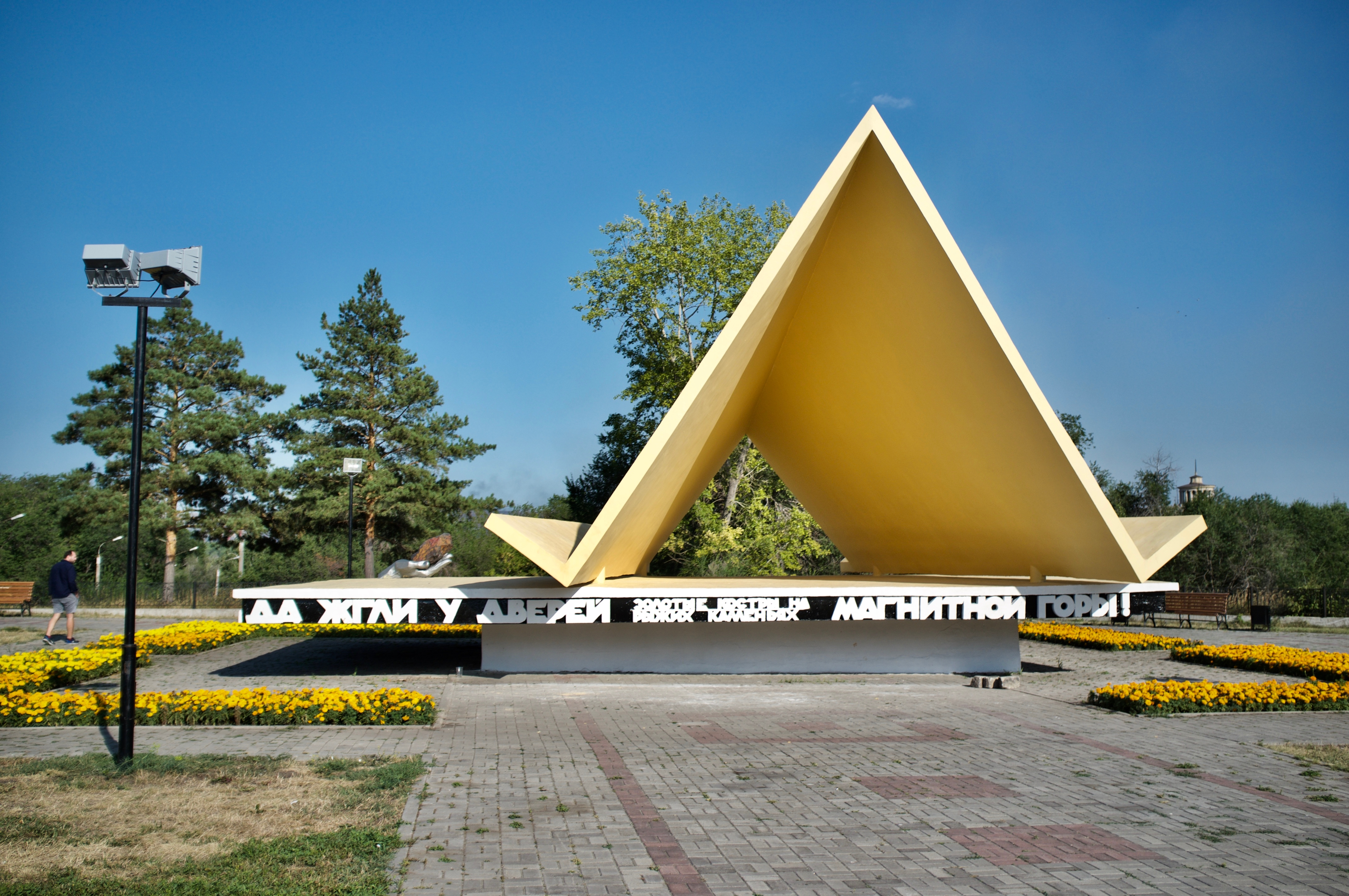
"The First Tent"

"The First Tent" (Russian: «Первая палатка») is the monument at the Sverdlov Square in Magnitogorsk, Russia dedicated to the first builders of the Magnitogorsk Iron and Steel Works, which is colloquially known as Magnitka. The official name of the monument is "The memorial sign 'The Tent of the First Builders of Magnitka'" (Russian: Памятный знак «Палатка первых строителей Магнитки»). The monument erected on a concrete pedestal consists of two parts: a symbolic representation of a tent and a palm that holds a piece of locally mined iron ore. Around the perimeter of the pedestal, there are lines from the verse of the local poet Boris Ruchyov:

Russian text	Transliteration	English translation
Мы жили в палатке с зелёным оконцем, промытой дождями, просушенной солнцем, да жгли у дверей золотые костры, на рыжих каменьях магнитной горы.	My zhili v palatke s zelyonym okontsem promytoy dozhdyami, prosushnnoy solntsem da zhgli u dverey zolotye kostry na ryzhikh kamenyakh marnitnoy gory.	We lived in a tent with a little green window, washed by the rains, dried by the sun, and made golden bonfires at the doors, on the red stones of the magnetic mountain.

It was inaugurated on the Victory Day, May 9, 1966. The monument was designed by Lev Golovnitsky and architect Yevgeniy Aleksandrov.
