= Vladilen Zakharov =

Russian ice hockey player (1994-)

- Born: January 12, 1994 (age 32) Magnitogorsk, Russia
- Height: 6 ft 4 in (193 cm)
- Weight: 229 lb (104 kg; 16 st 5 lb)
- Position: Forward
- Shot: Right
- Played for: Metallurg Magnitogorsk
- Playing career: 2014–2017

Vladilen Zakharov (born January 12, 1994) is a Russian former professional ice hockey player. He played with Metallurg Magnitogorsk of the Kontinental Hockey League (KHL).

Zakharov made his Kontinental Hockey League debut playing with Metallurg Magnitogorsk during the 2014–15 KHL season.
