= Magnitogorskii Rabochii =

Russian newspaper

- Type: daily
- Editor-in-chief: Kuralai Anasova (Russian: Куралай Бримжановна Анасова)
- Founded: 1930; 95 years ago
- Language: Russian
- Headquarters: Magnitogorsk
- Circulation: >50 000
- Website: http://mr-info.ru/

Magnitogorskii Rabochii (Magnitogorsk Worker, Russian: Магнитогорский рабочий) is a regional socio-political daily newspaper, published in Magnitogorsk by the government of the Chelyabinsk Oblast and the administration of the city; its circulation rose from 3 000 in 1930 to 20 000 by 1932 and 30 000 by 1934 – today it has a circulation of 51 000 per week.

== Literature ==
- Stephen Kotkin. Magnetic Mountain: Stalinism as a Civilization. — University of California Press, 1997. — PP. 62, 230, 316–318, 367, 595. — 727 p. — ISBN 9780520918856.
- Victoria E. Bonnell, Ann Cooper, Gregory Freidin. Russia at the Barricades: Eyewitness Accounts of the August 1991 Coup. — Routledge, 2015. — PP. xix, 322–328. — 393 p. — ISBN 9781317460527.
- Стародубова Олеся Юрьевна (2015). Деятельность рабочих корреспондентов Магнитогорска в годы Великой Отечественной войны // Проблемы истории, филологии, культуры, 4 (50), 174–181.
