= MMK-Atakaş Metallurgy =

Steelmaking company

MMK Metallurgy (MMK Metalurji Liman İşletmeciliği A.Ş.)
- Company type: Joint Stock
- Industry: Steel
- Founded: Iskenderun, Hatay Province, Turkey (May 23, 2007)
- Founder: MMK
- Headquarters: Dörtyol, Iskenderun, Hatay Province, Turkey
- Key people: Viktor Filippovich Rashnikov
- Products: Flat steel products
- Revenue: ▼$963.3 million (2022)
- Owner: 100% MMK (as of March 2011)
- Number of employees: 2,300
- Website: www.mmkturkey.com.tr

The MMK Metallurgy (Turkish: MMK Metalurji A.Ş.) is a multi-national steelmaking company established 2007 in Iskenderun, southern Turkey. Company's main plant, located in Dörtyol, began production in 2011 after three years of construction time. The total investment is worth of $2.7 billion.

An agreement to found a joint venture company for manufacturing flat steel products was signed on May 23, 2007 in Iskenderun between Viktor Filippovich Rashnikov, chairman of the Russian steelmaking company Magnitogorsk Iron and Steel Works (MMK) and Recep Atakaş, chairman of the Turkish Atakaş Group of Companies.

The foundation of the plant, covering an area of 500 ha (1.9 mi^{2}) in Dörtyol district of Hatay Province, was laid during a ceremony held on March 15, 2008. Already in the beginning of 2009, plant's service center consisting of a hot shear line, and a combined cold shear and slitting line went in operation. The construction of the plant was completed in 2010, and it was officially opened by the Turkish Prime Minister Recep Tayyip Erdoğan on March 9, 2011. The construction of another plant is planned in Istanbul.

The Italian company Danieli provided the key process equipment required. The plant has an annual production capacity of 2,500,000 m (8,200,000 ft) of various flat steel products. The company employs about 2,500 people.

As stated by Victor Rashnikov, the production is planned mainly for the domestic market. However, exportation into countries in Europe and Middle East are in consideration.

The MMK Metallurgy owns a seaport with a berthing length of 1,200 m (3,900 ft), at which in total twelve vessels any type of dry bulk, general cargo, scrap iron carriers, container ships and ro-ro vessels up to 100,000 DWT can be berthed and handled at the same time. The seaport is since April 5, 2010 in operation.

== Plant ==
The steel plant consists of five product lines at three facilities, in Dörtyol, Iskenderun and Istanbul, for the processing of different flat steel products:

Service center

Two service centers are in operation, in Iskenderun and Istanbul. They are equipped with a hot shear line and a combined cold shear and slitting line. At the hot shear line, steel coils of 1–8 mm (0.039–0.315 in) thickness and 800–1,600 mm (31–63 in) width can be cut to sheets of 1,000–8,000 mm (39–315 in) length. The combined line is capable of processing coils with material thickness of 0.25–3 mm (0.0098–0.1181 in) and width of 800–1,600 mm (31–63 in) to slices of minimum 60 mm (2.4 in) width and 500–6,000 mm (20–236 in) length.

Color coating line

At this line, yearly 200,000 m (660,000 ft) coils of 0.25–1.20 mm (0.0098–0.0472 in) thickness and 800–1,500 mm (31–59 in) width can be color coated. The color coating line went in operation by January 2010.

Hot dip galvanizing line

At the hot dip galvanizing line, coils with 0.25–3.0 mm (0.0098–0.1181 in) thickness and 800–1,530 mm (31–60 in) width can be processed. The annual capacity of the line is 450,000 m (1,480,000 ft).

Continuous pickling line

At the continuous pickling line located in Iskenderun, coils of 1–5 mm (0.039–0.197 in) thickness and 800–1,600 mm (31–63 in) width can be processed for pickling. The line's annual capacity is 1,200,000 m (3,900,000 ft).

Cold reversing mill

Steel coils of 1.5–4.5 mm (0.059–0.177 in) thickness and 800–1,530 mm (31–60 in) width can be cold reversed at the mill in Iskenderun. The line's annual capacity is 750,000 m (2,460,000 ft).
