= Pavel Shilyaev =

Russian politician (born 1970)

- Павел Шиляев

Member of the Legislative Assembly of Chelyabinsk Oblast
- Incumbent
- Assumed office 24 September 2015

Personal details
- Born: 3 July 1970 (age 56) Kurgan, Kurgan Oblast, Russian SFSR, USSR
- Party: United Russia
- Education: South Ural State University
- Profession: Politician

Pavel Vladimirovich Shilyaev (Russian: Павел Владимирович Шиляев; born 3 July 1970) is a Russian politician, who currently serves as a member of the Legislative Assembly of Chelyabinsk Oblast since 2015.

== Biography ==
=== Early life ===
After graduating from the South Ural State University in 1992, Shilyaev worked as an engineer at the Magnitogorsk Iron and Steel Works. In 2014, the board of directors elected him as the company's CEO.

=== Legislative Assembly of Chelyabinsk Oblast ===
In the 2015 Russian elections, Shilyaev was elected as a member of the Legislative Assembly of Chelyabinsk Oblast from United Russia in the 28th electoral district.

In the Legislative Assembly, Shilyaev headed the Committee on Industrial Policy, Energy, Transport and Tariff Regulation.
