= Agapovsky District =

Agapovsky District Агаповский район (Russian)
- District
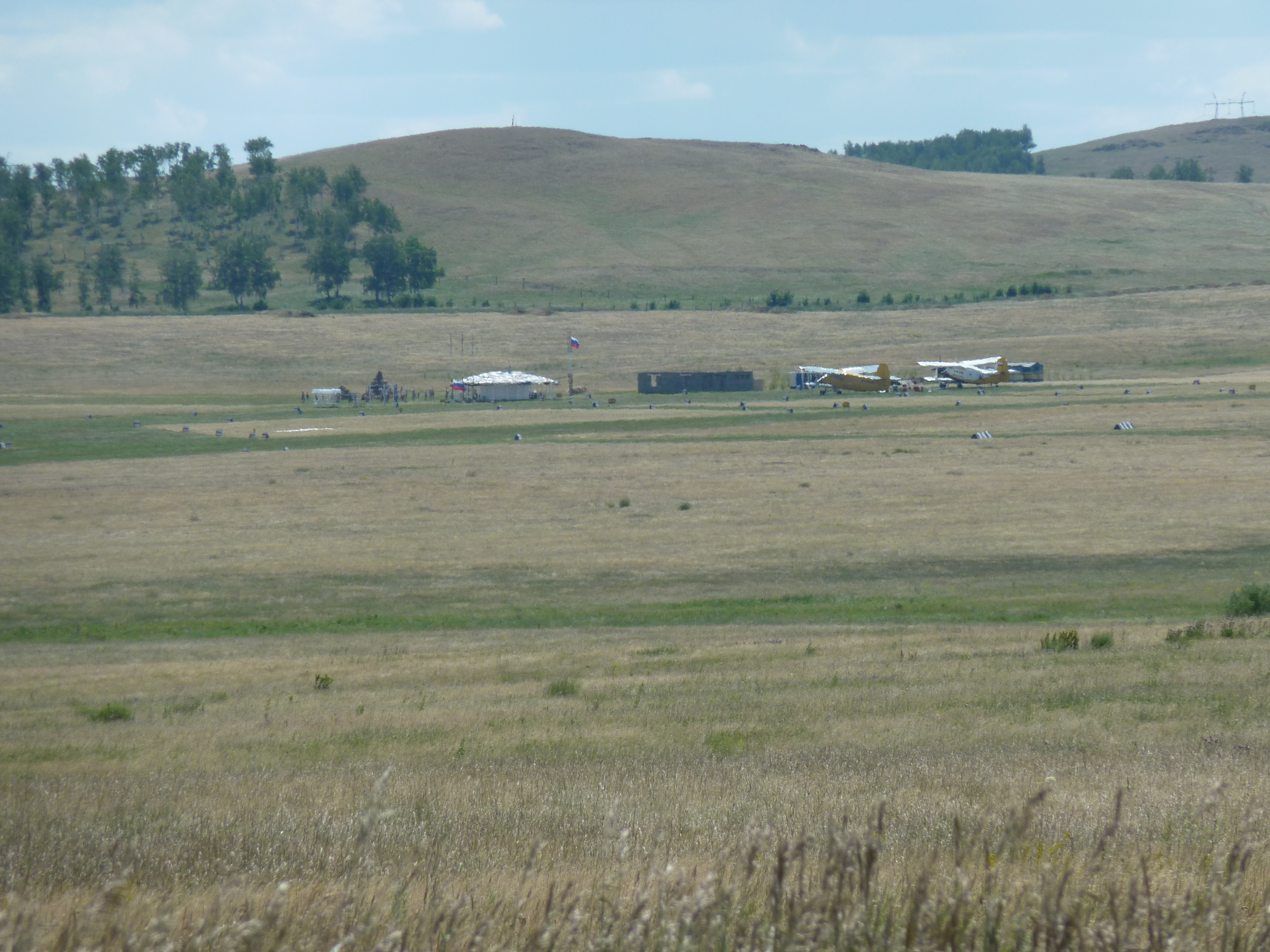
- Airfield in Agapovsky District

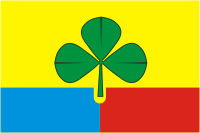
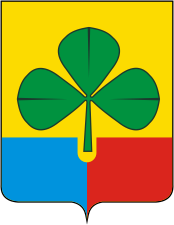
- Flag Coat of arms
- Location of Agapovsky District in Chelyabinsk Oblast
- Coordinates: 53°17′39″N 59°08′04″E
- Country: Russia
- Federal subject: Chelyabinsk Oblast
- Established: 1935
- Administrative center: Agapovka

Area
  - Total: 2,603.6 km^{2} (1,005.3 sq mi)

Population (2010 Census)
  - Total: 34,779
  - Density: 13.358/km^{2} (34.597/sq mi)
  - Urban: 0%
  - Rural: 100%

Administrative structure
  - Administrative divisions: 10 Selsoviets
  - Inhabited localities: 47 rural localities

Municipal structure
  - Municipally incorporated as: Agapovsky Municipal District
  - Municipal divisions: 0 urban settlements, 10 rural settlements
- Time zone: UTC+5 (MSK+2)
- OKTMO ID: 75603000
- Website: http://www.agapovka.ru/

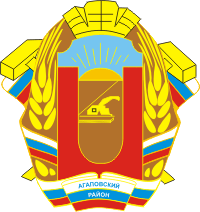
1998 coat of arms of Agapovsky District

Agapovsky District (Russian: Ага́повский райо́н) is an administrative and municipal district (raion), one of the twenty-seven in Chelyabinsk Oblast, Russia. It is located in the southwest of the oblast. The area of the district is 2,603.6 square kilometers (1,005.3 sq mi). Its administrative center is the rural locality (a selo) of Agapovka. Population: 34,779 (2010 census); 37,816 (2002 Census); 35,919 (1989 Soviet census). The population of Agapovka accounts for 18.9% of the district's total population.
