= Nikita Zhloba =

Russian ice hockey player

- Born: 16 August 1995 (age 30) Magnitogorsk, Russia
- Height: 192 cm (6 ft 4 in)
- Weight: 94 kg (207 lb; 14 st 11 lb)
- Position: Defence
- Shoots: Left
- KHL team: Metallurg Magnitogorsk
- Playing career: 2014–present

Nikita Zhloba (born 16 August 1995) is a Russian ice hockey defenceman. He is currently playing with Metallurg Magnitogorsk of the Kontinental Hockey League (KHL).

Zhloba made his Kontinental Hockey League debut playing with Metallurg Magnitogorsk during the 2014–15 KHL season.
