= Kizilskoye =

Rural locality in Chelyabinsk Oblast, Russia

Coordinates: 52°43′31″N 58°53′59″E

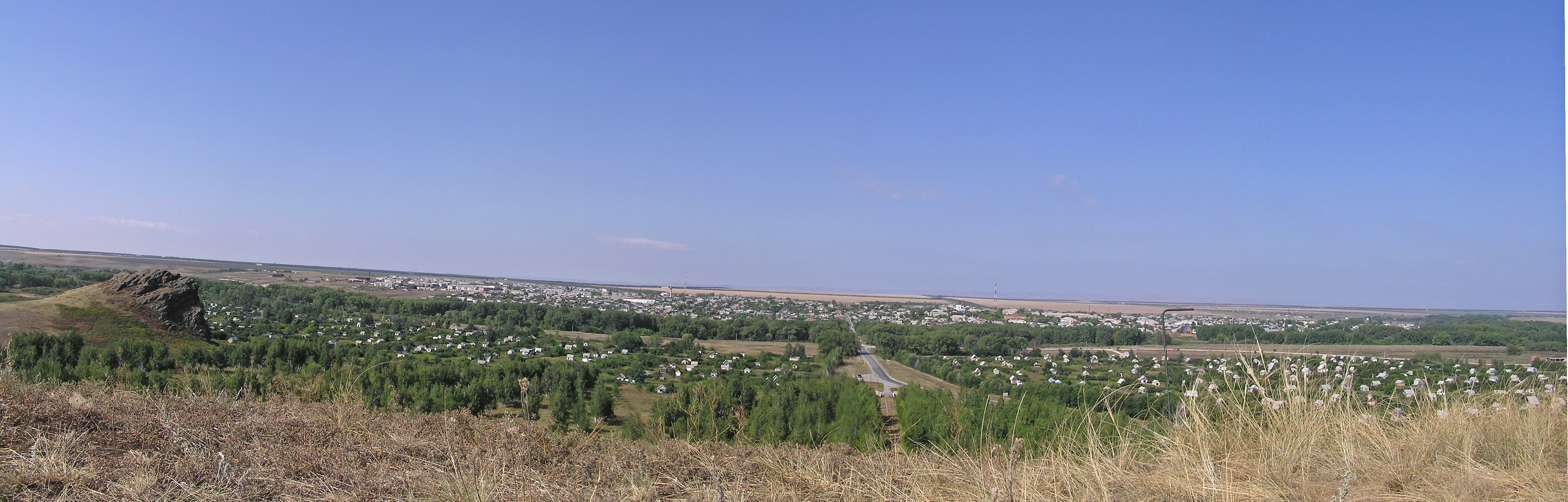
View of Kizilskoye

Kizilskoye (Russian: Кизильское) is a rural locality (a selo) and the administrative center of Kizilsky District, Chelyabinsk Oblast, Russia. Population: 6,651 (2010 census); 6,496 (2002 census); 6,700 (1989 Soviet census).
