= Verkhneuralsky District =

Verkhneuralsky District Верхнеуральский район (Russian)
- District
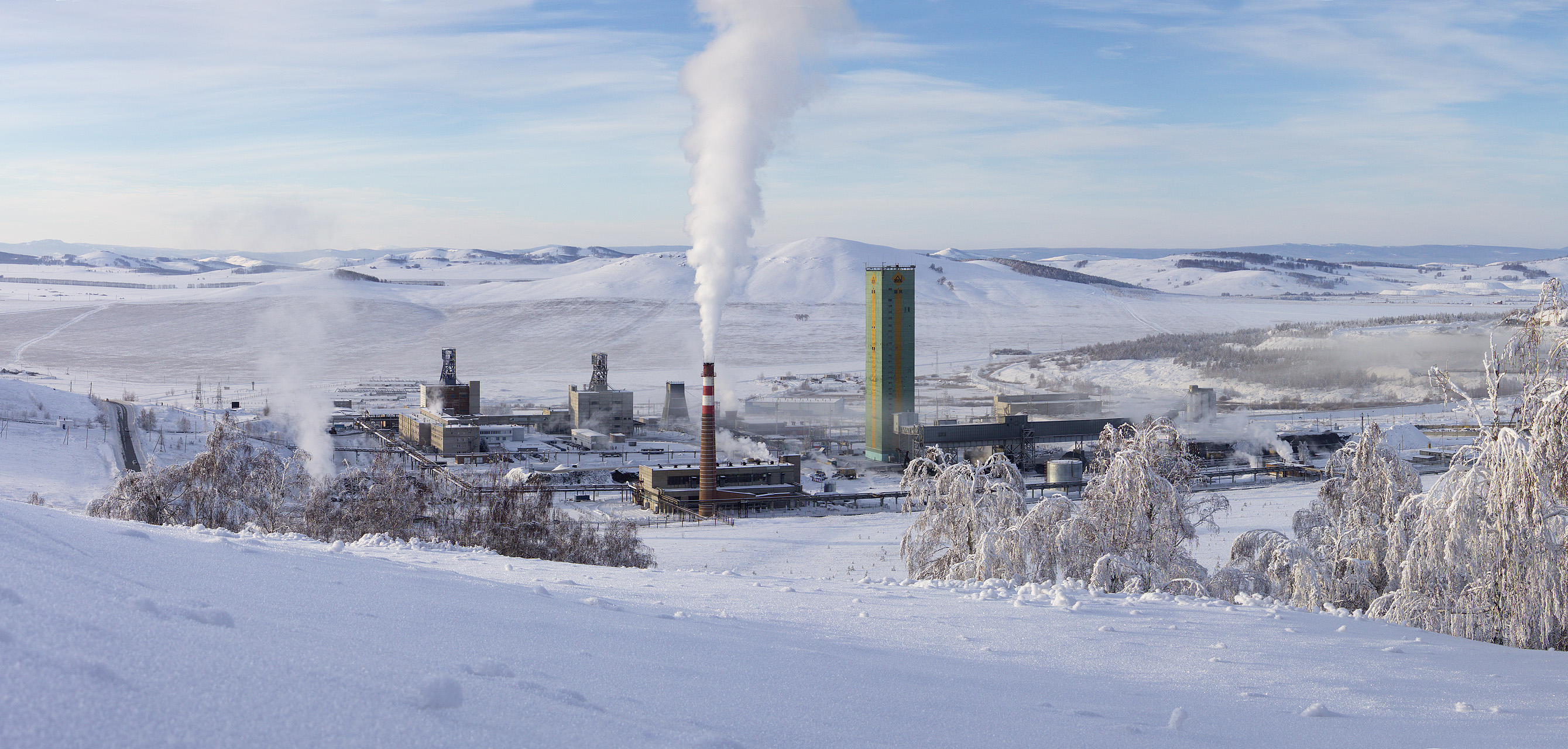
- One of the few mines of the Uchaly Mining and Metallurgical Combine in Verkhneuralsky District

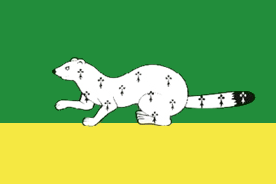
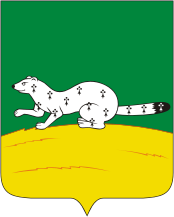
- Flag Coat of arms
- Location of Verkhneuralsky District in Chelyabinsk Oblast
- Coordinates: 53°53′N 59°13′E
- Country: Russia
- Federal subject: Chelyabinsk Oblast
- Administrative center: Verkhneuralsk

Area
  - Total: 3,510 km^{2} (1,360 sq mi)

Population (2010 Census)
  - Total: 36,198
  - Density: 10.3/km^{2} (26.7/sq mi)
  - Urban: 46.5%
  - Rural: 53.5%

Administrative structure
  - Administrative divisions: 1 Towns, 1 Work settlements, 8 Selsoviets
  - Inhabited localities: 1 cities/towns, 1 urban-type settlements, 49 rural localities

Municipal structure
  - Municipally incorporated as: Verkhneuralsky Municipal District
  - Municipal divisions: 2 urban settlements, 8 rural settlements
- Time zone: UTC+5 (MSK+2)
- OKTMO ID: 75617000
- Website: http://www.verhneuralsk.ru/

Verkhneuralsky District (Russian: Верхнеура́льский райо́н) is an administrative and municipal district (raion), one of the twenty-seven in Chelyabinsk Oblast, Russia. It is located in the west of the oblast. The area of the district is 3,510 square kilometers (1,360 sq mi). Its administrative center is the town of Verkhneuralsk. Population: 36,198 (2010 census); 42,121 (2002 Census); 44,470 (1989 Soviet census). The population of Verkhneuralsk accounts for 26.1% of the district's total population.
