= Magnitogorsk State Technical University =

University in Magnitogorsk, Russia

Coordinates: 53.42123°N 58.98211°E

- Магнитогорский государственный технический университет
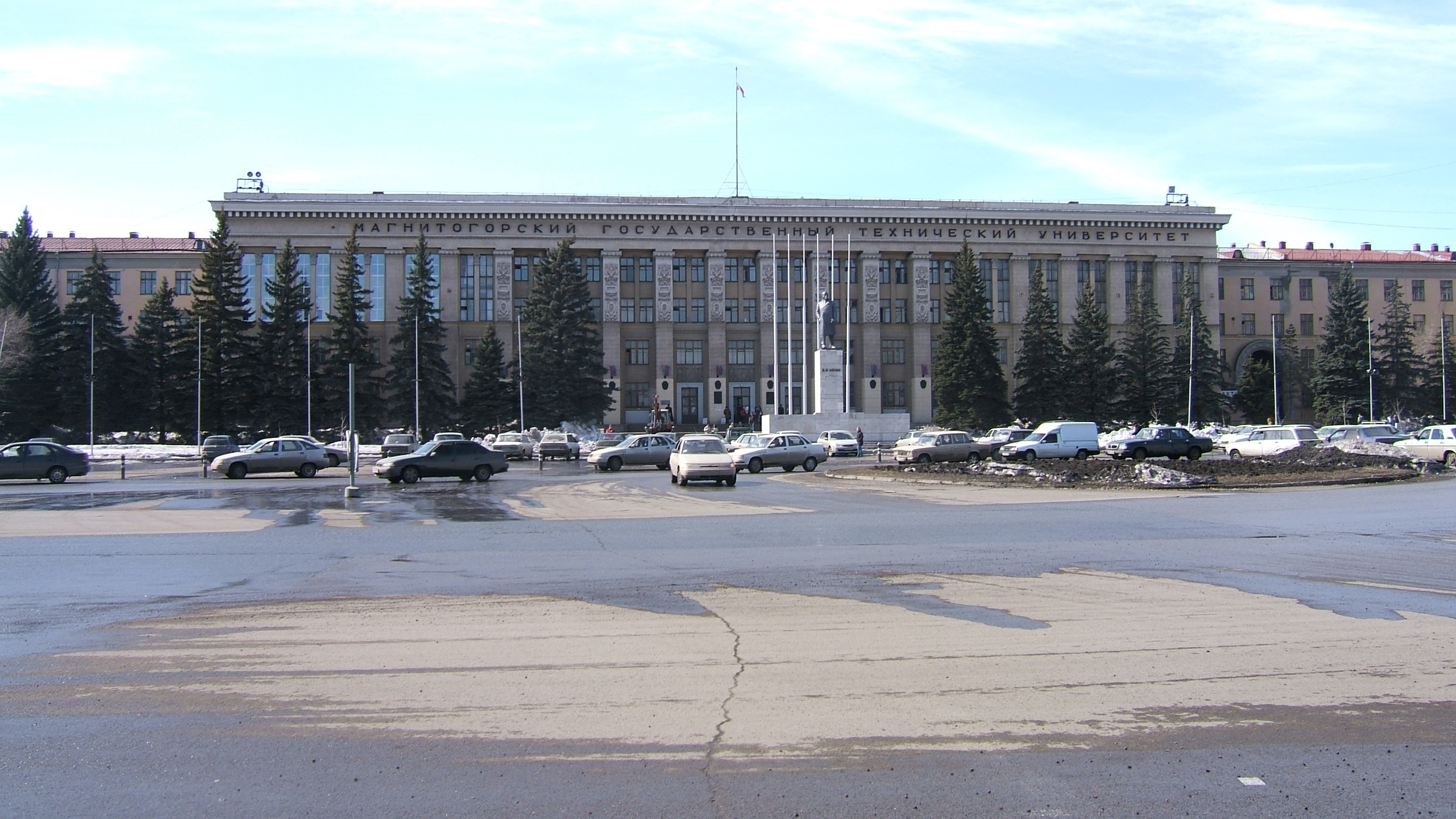
- Established: 1932
- Location: Magnitogorsk, Russia
- Website: www.magtu.ru

University rankings

Regional – Overall
- QS Emerging Europe and Central Asia: 251-300 (2022)

Magnitogorsk State Technical University is located in Magnitogorsk, Chelyabinsk Oblast, Russia. Though it was established from merging branches of higher educational institutions in Ural in 1932, it was officially declared only in 1934, as Magnitogorsk Institute of Mining and Metallurgy. In 1951, it was named after a long-term director of Magnitogorsk Iron and Steel Works, Grigory Ivanovich Nosov. It obtained its current name in 1998.
