= Kizilsky District =

Kizilsky District Кизильский район (Russian)
- District
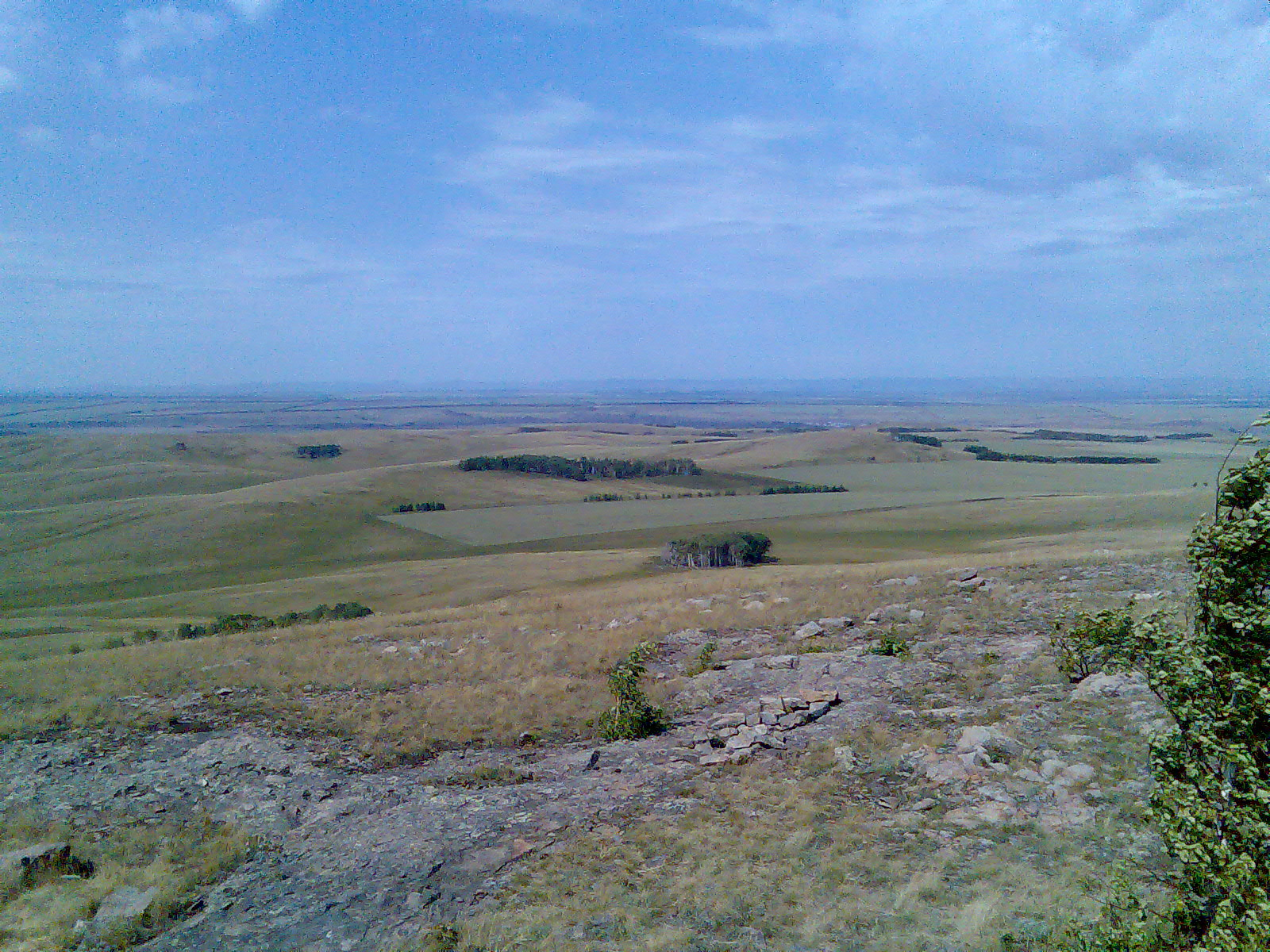
- View to the village Gryaznushensky, Kizilsky District

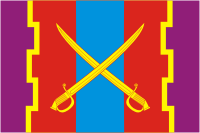
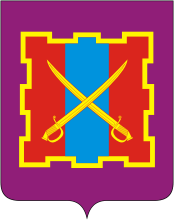
- Flag Coat of arms
- Location of Kizilsky District in Chelyabinsk Oblast
- Coordinates: 52°43′30″N 58°53′30″E
- Country: Russia
- Federal subject: Chelyabinsk Oblast
- Established: 4 November 1926
- Administrative center: Kizilskoye

Area
  - Total: 4,413 km^{2} (1,704 sq mi)

Population (2010 Census)
  - Total: 25,876
  - Density: 5.864/km^{2} (15.19/sq mi)
  - Urban: 0%
  - Rural: 100%

Administrative structure
  - Administrative divisions: 14 selsoviet
  - Inhabited localities: 52 rural localities

Municipal structure
  - Municipally incorporated as: Kizilsky Municipal District
  - Municipal divisions: 0 urban settlements, 14 rural settlements
- Time zone: UTC+5 (MSK+2)
- OKTMO ID: 75632000
- Website: http://www.kizil74.ru/

Kizilsky District (Russian: Кизильский райо́н; Kazakh: Қызыл ауданы, Qyzyl aýdany) is an administrative and municipal district (raion), one of the twenty-seven in Chelyabinsk Oblast, Russia. It is located in the southwest of the oblast. The area of the district is 4,413 square kilometers (1,704 sq mi). Its administrative center is the rural locality (a selo) of Kizilskoye. Population: 25,876 (2010 census); 27,679 (2002 Census); 30,220 (1989 Soviet census). The population of Kizilskoye accounts for 25.7% of the district's total population.
