= Verkhneuralsk =

Verkhneuralsk Верхнеуральск
- Town
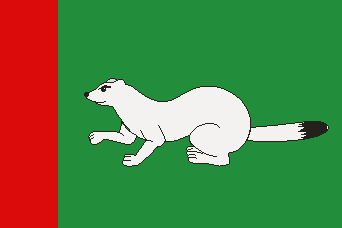
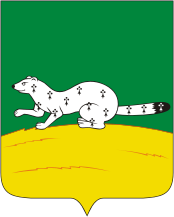
- Flag Coat of arms
- Interactive map of Verkhneuralsk
- Location of Verkhneuralsk Verkhneuralsk (Chelyabinsk Oblast)
- Coordinates: 53°53′N 59°15′E
- Country: Russia
- Federal subject: Chelyabinsk Oblast
- Administrative district: Verkhneuralsky District
- TownSelsoviet: Verkhneuralsk
- Founded: 1734
- Town status since: 1781
- Elevation: 412 m (1,352 ft)

Population (2010 Census)
  - Total: 9,457
  - Estimate (2023): 8,861 (−6.3%)

Administrative status
  - Capital of: Verkhneuralsky District, Town of Verkhneuralsk

Municipal status
  - Municipal district: Verkhneuralsky Municipal District
  - Urban settlement: Verkhneuralskoye Urban Settlement
  - Capital of: Verkhneuralsky Municipal District, Verkhneuralskoye Urban Settlement
- Time zone: UTC+5 (MSK+2)
- Postal codes: 457670–457672, 457688
- Dialing code: +7 35143
- OKTMO ID: 75617101001

Verkhneuralsk (Russian: Верхнеура́льск) is a town and the administrative center of Verkhneuralsky District in Chelyabinsk Oblast, Russia, located in the upper streams of the Ural River, 230 kilometers (140 mi) southwest of Chelyabinsk, the administrative center of the oblast. Population: 9,457 (2010 census); 10,054 (2002 census); 10,893 (1989 Soviet census).

== History ==
Founded in 1734 as the fortress of Verkhneyaitskaya (Верхнея́ицкая), it was renamed Verkhneuralskaya (Верхнеура́льская) after the Yaik River was renamed the Ural. Town status was granted to it in 1781.

== Administrative and municipal status ==
Within the framework of administrative divisions, Verkhneuralsk serves as the administrative center of Verkhneuralsky District. As an administrative division, it is incorporated within Verkhneuralsky District as the Town of Verkhneuralsk. As a municipal division, the Town of Verkhneuralsk is incorporated within Verkhneuralsky Municipal District as Verkhneuralskoye Urban Settlement.
