= Magnitogorsk Iron and Steel Works =

Iron and steel company

Coordinates: 53°25′54″N 59°03′16″E

PJSC Magnitogorsk Iron and Steel Works

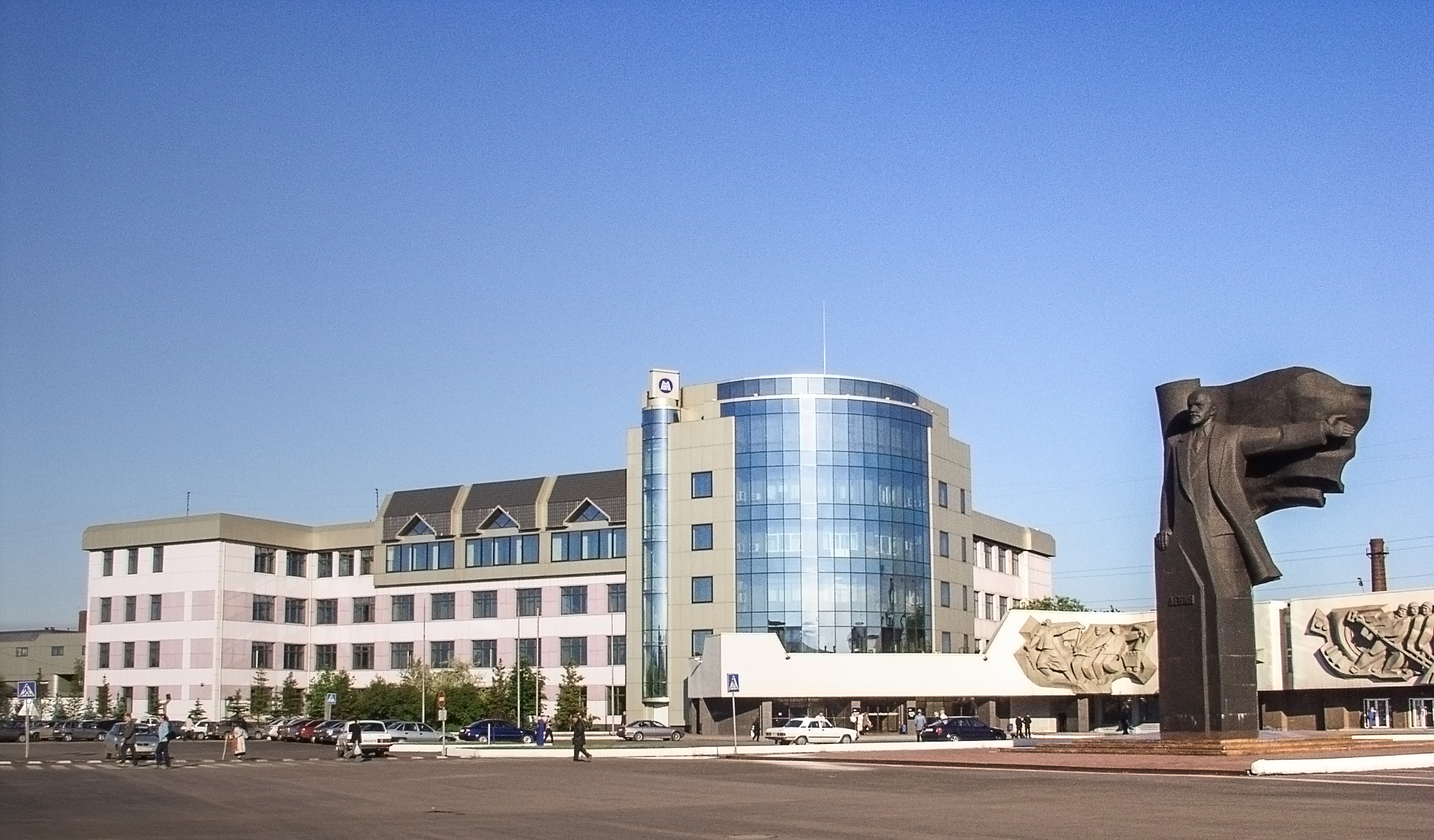
- Native name: ПАО "Магнитогорский металлургический комбинат"
- Type: Public (ПAO)
- Traded as: MCX: MAGN
- Industry: Industrial Metals & Mining (Sector)
- Headquarters: Magnitogorsk, Russia
- Key people: Pavel Shilyaev (Chairman)
- Products: Iron & Steel (Subsector)
- Revenue: $7.28 billion (2025)
- Operating income: $256 million (2025)
- Net income: −$177 million (2025)
- Total assets: $10.5 billion (2025)
- Total equity: $7.94 billion (2025)
- Website: www.mmk.ru

Magnitogorsk Iron and Steel Works (Russian: Магнитогорский металлургический комбинат, romanized: Magnitogorskiy Metallurgicheskiy Kombinat), abbreviated as MMK, informally called Magnitka (Магнитка), is an iron and steel company located in the city of Magnitogorsk, Russia. As of 2017, it was the 30th largest steel company in the world. In 2021, the company's revenue amounted to 786 billion rubles (€7,471,716,000).

== History of Magnitogorsk mining ==
Historically, the centre of Russian iron production was focused in the Tula region. However, in the early part of the 18th century, a shift towards developing the industrial capabilities of the Urals occurred, resulting in more than a doubling of Russia's iron production. In 1828, a series of geological surveys began as part of an effort to determine the mineral make up of the Magnitnaya Mountain and create estimates of the possible amount of iron contained underneath it. By the latter part of the 19th century, a small town had been established and had grown to more than 10,000 residents. During this period, between 30,000 and 50,000 tons of raw iron were extracted annually in the area.

== Establishment of MMK ==
In the 1870s, most Russian iron ore, steel, and pig iron was produced in Ukraine. In 1913, Ukraine, with its rich deposits and developed industry, accounted for 75% of iron ore production, compared to 21% in the Urals. While Ukraine remained the center of metal production, neighboring regions were significantly less developed. It was only after the October Revolution of 1917 that the effort to expand the steel industry came to the fore.

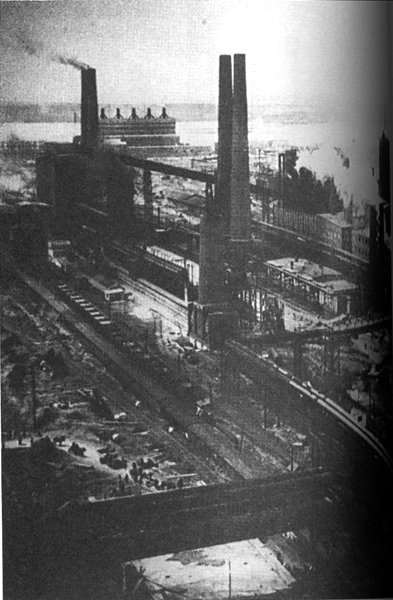
The Magnitogorsk steel production facility in the 1930s.

As part of Soviet leader Joseph Stalin's First Five-Year Plan, the government decided to sponsor a project to build the world's largest steel production complex. The Soviets initially planned the project, with the American-based Arthur McKee & Company brought in later to oversee its construction and assist in its planning. The plan to transform Magnitogorsk (which would become MMK) into an industrial complex was linked to the construction of the new city of Stalinsk, which had a large supply of coal.

To manage the Magnitogorsk construction, the trust "Magnitostroy" (Russian: Магнитострой) was established in January 1929. While there were disagreements regarding the timetable and massive shortages of supplies, the project to build the complex began in 1929 with the influx of thousands of Soviet workers. The American contractors were critical of the project's handling and frustrated by its mismanagement, and as a result, the Soviets ended up designing a large proportion of the complex themselves. The failure to properly organize the construction efforts was partly due to the Soviet government's tight deadlines, which they deemed essential to meet their Five-Year Plan. Additionally, several key personnel were replaced due to political concerns over loyalty to the Communist Party.

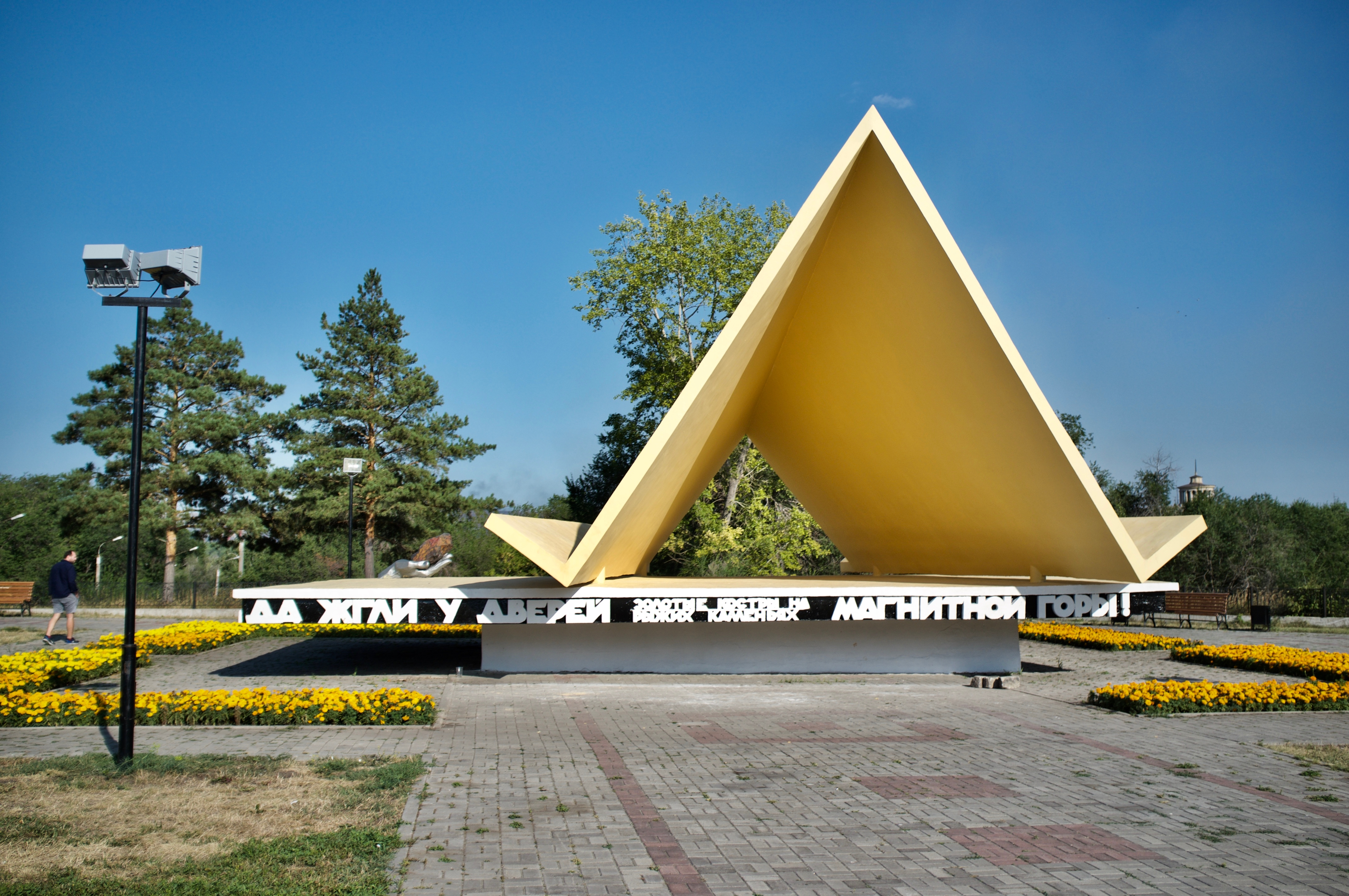
"The First Tent", monument to the first builders of the plant

Despite claims made by the advisors from Arthur McKee & Company that the facilities were not yet ready for use, the furnaces at MMK were put into action in 1932, and the first flow of molten pig iron was produced. Although the move to begin production pleased the Soviet leadership, the plant was forced to halt its production only a few days later as serious repairs to the furnaces were needed. By 1933, the plant was producing steel.

== World War II ==
MMK played an important role in the Soviet victory over Nazi Germany, being the largest steel enterprise in the Soviet Union, and located far away from combat on the Eastern Front. The strategic reasoning for developing such large modern iron and steel works deep inside the country stemmed from the fact that defending the nation would require huge amounts of steel, which would need to be produced in an area as safe as possible from foreign invasion and aerial bombing raids.

The notion of protecting the USSR's industrial base from invasion and bombing by locating it deep in the interior was not pursued as completely during the 1930s as it might have been; what parts of it were not overrun and confiscated by the Germans were hastily moved eastward in 1941 and 1942. In 1942, the West knew that "at least one armament factory previously situated near Leningrad has arrived in Magnitogorsk lock, stock, and barrel, complete with personnel, and is already going into production using Magnitogorsk steel." The extent of Western knowledge of the massive eastward shift was summed up as follows: "...Even before the outbreak of war, large electrical equipment plants were removed from White Belorussia on the German frontier and also from the Leningrad district to the Urals and Western Siberia. One such plant is reported to have been relocated to Sverdlovsk in 1940 and to have resumed normal production in March 1941. Any plant except the largest smelting, steelmaking, and chemical works can be moved by railroad fairly quickly and with little damage." "...Thus, while no figures will be available for some time, it is my opinion that large portions of the industrial machinery formerly located in areas now occupied by the Germans, instead of being captured by them, are already in operation a thousand or more miles east of the present front, in Stalin's Ural Stronghold."

Following the Nazi Germany invasion of the Soviet Union on 22 June 1941, MMK obtained its first order for the production of metal armor. Instructions were given to proceed to the production of blanks for live shells, and to explore the possibilities of creating specialist products for armored tanks, which would require a renovation of the production facility. The government provided some specialists to develop armored steel. The factory established an Armor Bureau, which was responsible for developing technology for the production of armored steel products. By 23 July 1941, the third hearth furnace at MMK had produced its first steel output for the military.

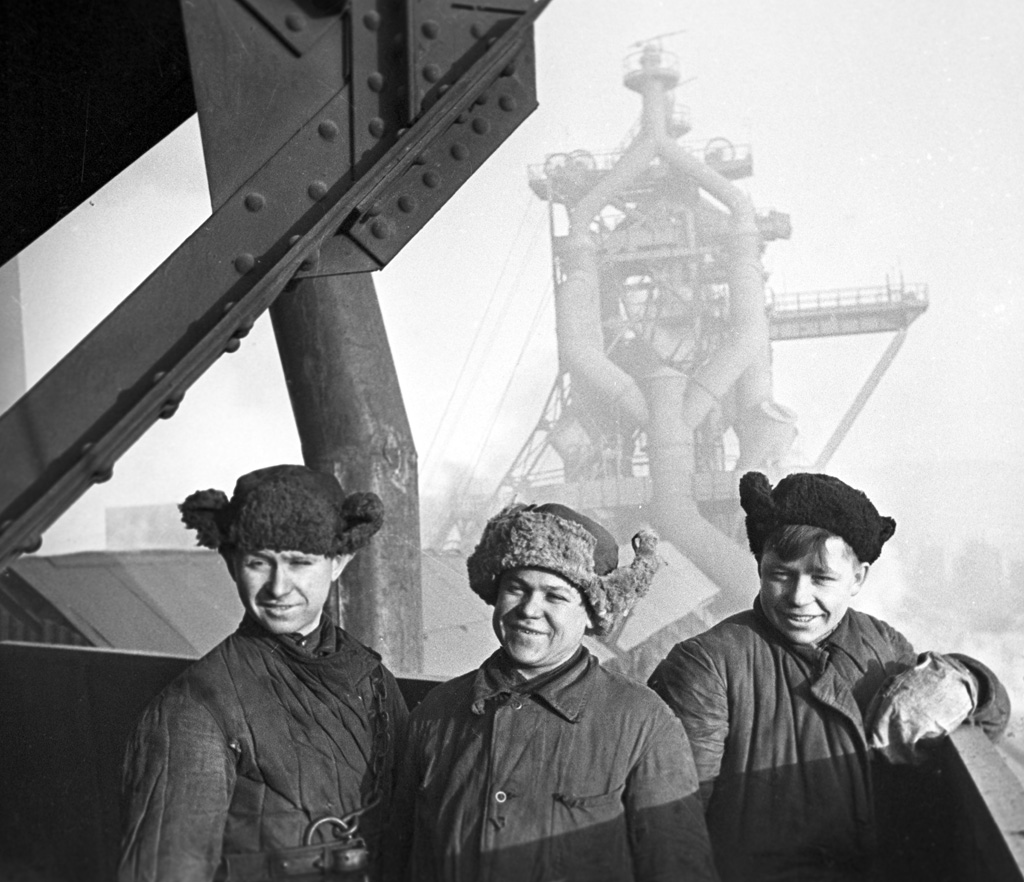
Komsomol members during the construction of the sixth furnace in 1943.

Armor sheet production at MMK at the end of 1941 exceeded its pre-war production. Simultaneously, specialized areas and workshops for ammunition production were improved. Hand grenades, missile components, and other defense products were manufactured. Magnitogorsk was converted into the country's major military arsenal. The construction and commissioning of new production units continued. Attention was concentrated on blast furnaces No. 5 and No. 6, and the steel produced in these blast furnaces became the largest in the USSR.

Several techniques that impacted the theory and practice of construction were developed on-site. Owing to the completion of such a large plant and its capability to fully cycle ore into the final product, the nation survived the loss of huge tracts of territory to the Germans.

In 1941, though the factory was not yet completely built, child labour was already being employed at what was called the CL (Central Laboratory). During the first years of the war, about 200,000 teenagers arrived to work at the factory. They worked 10–11 hours a day, and in extreme situations, they sometimes stayed in the factory for 10 days at a time. It is partly due to these children that Magnitogorsk was able to build the first tanks and aircraft, as they collected 57 million rubles to help the war front.

By 1 February 1941, about 428,000 people were sent to the Chelyabinsk region to help and work at the factory and its surroundings, to raise necessary funds for the war effort. Due to a significant housing shortage, on 25 August, the factory leadership decided to initiate a project that included the development of barracks and huts. Educational institutions and health centers with hospitals were also planned as the factory grew.

Before the first hostilities in 1940, MMK was producing tanks, but production was sluggish. It was thus decided to stop the production of tractors and other machine products in favour of the development and manufacturing of tanks. According to the direction of the State Defense Committee, it was decided to organize mass production of the T-34 medium tank. The fate of the front and the country largely depended on how soon the factory could begin to produce tanks.

== MMK in the post-Soviet era ==
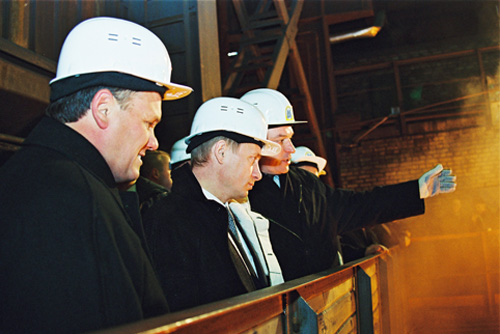
Vladimir Putin visiting the plant in December 2000.

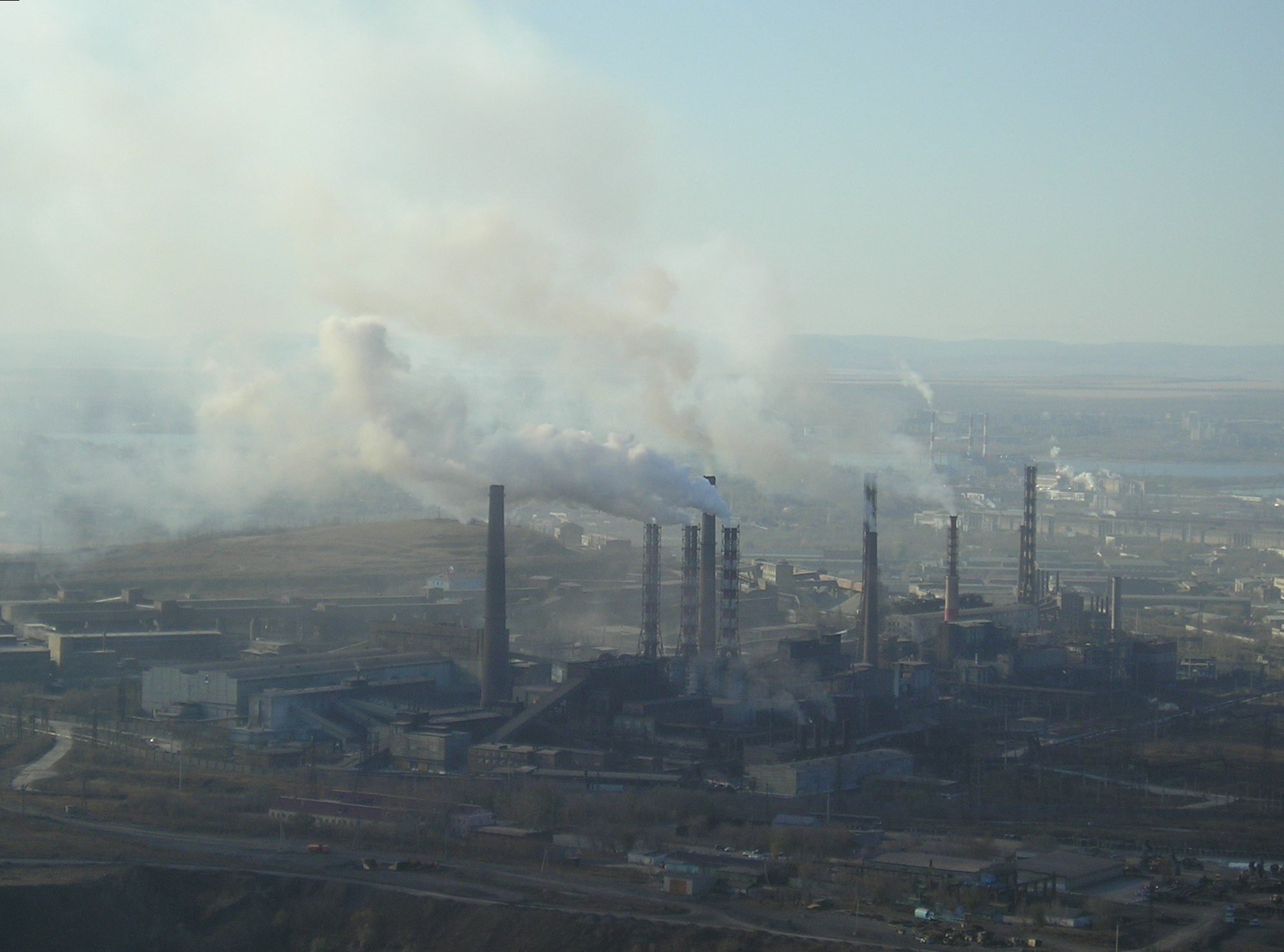
A view of the plant in 2008.

As with the majority of the state-run industries, MMK underwent a series of shifts towards privatization after the fall of the Soviet Union. In 1992, MMK transitioned to become a joint-stock company. Due in part to Russia's economic downturn at the time, MMK experienced a significant decline in productivity. In 1996, production fell to 5.8 million tons per year.

By the turn of the 21st century, however, MMK had rebounded with significantly increased productivity by entering new sectors of the metalworking industry. In 2007, the company became a publicly traded company on the London Stock Exchange, and in 2008, crude steel production at the plant was reported to have reached some 12 million tons. There has also been a move to enter new international markets. Production has increasingly shifted towards the export market, with some years reporting the share of exports comprising 70% of total production.

After Russia invaded Ukraine in February 2022, the company was suspended from the LSE, and subsequently delisted.

MMK now produces 400 different types of steel, and one of its workshops is a mile long.

== Joint venture investment in Turkey ==
On 23 May 2007, MMK signed a joint venture agreement with the Turkish steel company Atakaş to construct and run a steel plant in the Hatay Province of southern Turkey. On 15 March 2008, the plant's foundation was laid in Dörtyol, Hatay. As of early 2009, the plant's service center consisted of a hot shear line, as well as a combined cold shear and slitting line.

The plant, which has a capacity of 2.5 million tons of steel products a year, was officially opened by Turkish Prime Minister Recep Tayyip Erdoğan on 9 March 2011. It is one of the biggest of its kind in Turkey. On 10 March 2011, it was reported that the MMK applied to the Turkish competition board to buy its Turkish partner's stake.

== Social responsibility ==
MMK's facilities employ 38% of the surrounding city's working-age population. The company accounted for 57% of the city's budget in 2016, representing a 7% increase from 2015.

The local hockey team, Metallurg Magnitogorsk, is also owned by MMK.

=== Metallurg Charity Foundation ===
One of the channels through which MMK's social investments are made is the Metallurg Charity Fund, which was founded in 1993. In 2016, the financial resources of the fund were €8.7 million.

== Carbon footprint ==
Magnitogorsk Iron & Steel Works reported total CO2e emissions (Direct + Indirect) of 26,798 kilotons for twelve months, ending on 31 December 2020.

== See also ==
- Time, Forward!, a 1965 Soviet film about one day of the construction of "Magnitka"
