= Magnitogorsk =

City in Chelyabinsk Oblast, Russia

Magnitogorsk Магнитогорск
- City
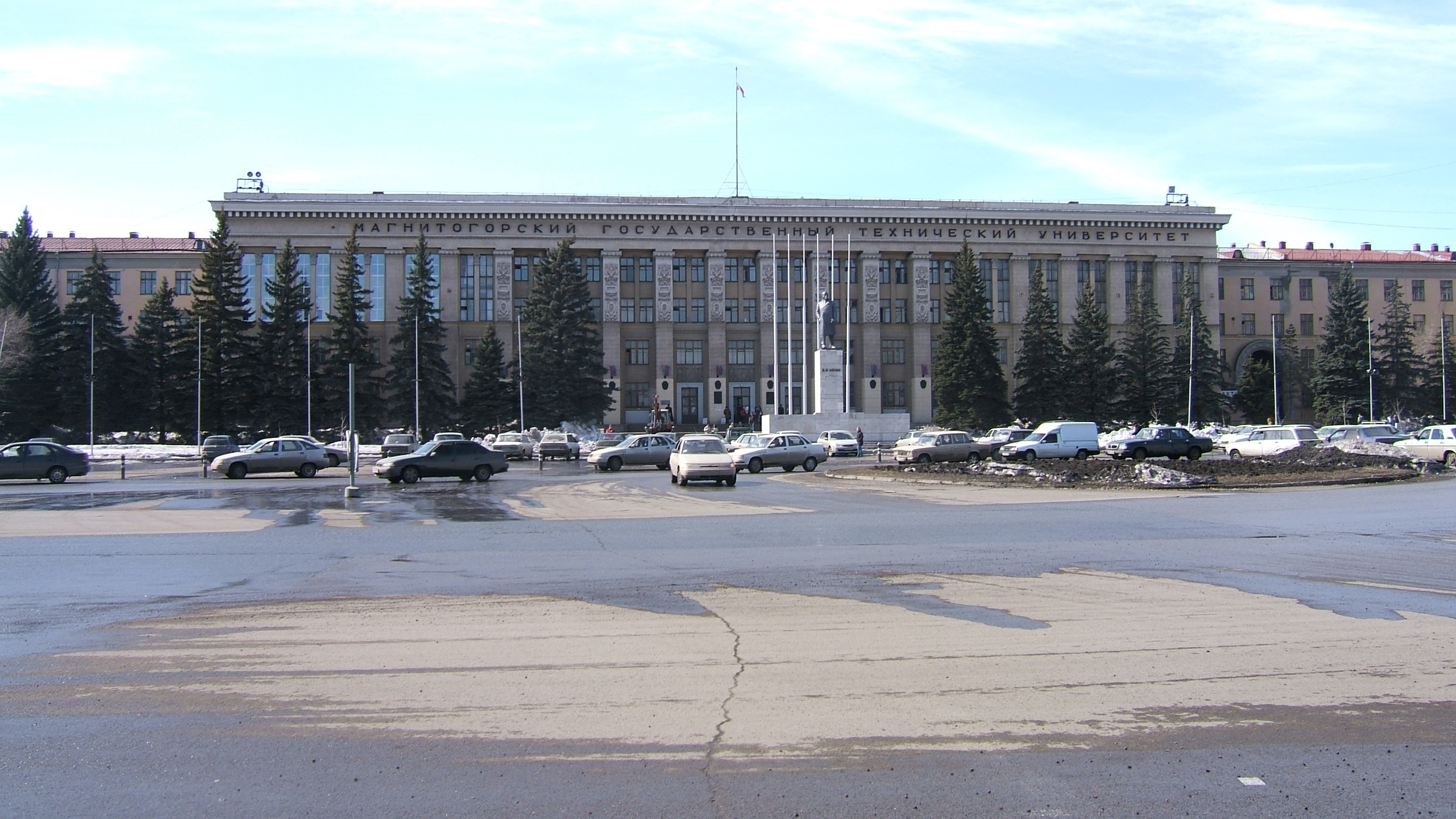
- Magnitogorsk State Technical University

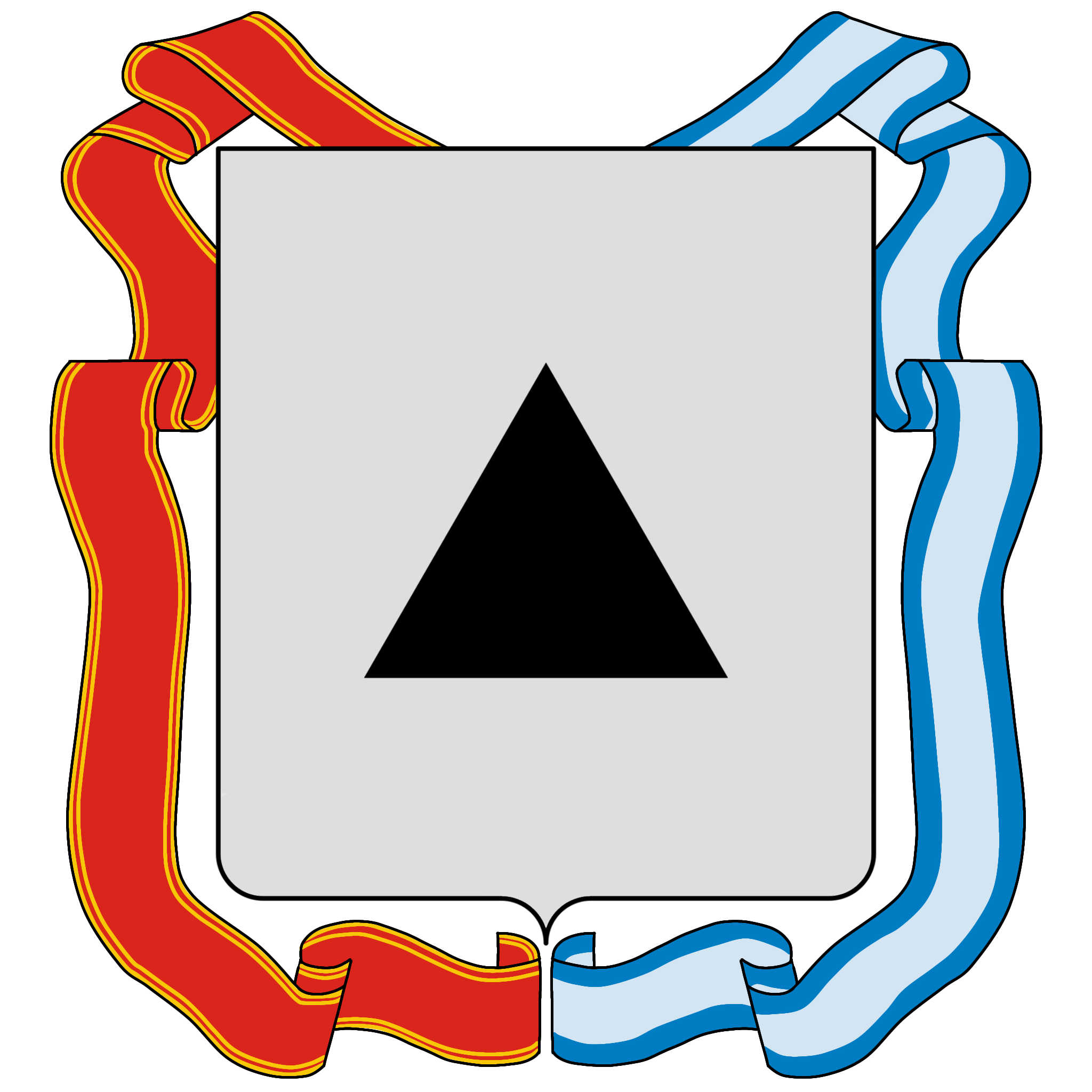
- Flag Coat of arms
- Interactive map of Magnitogorsk
- Location of Magnitogorsk Magnitogorsk (Chelyabinsk Oblast)
- Coordinates: 53°23′N 59°02′E
- Country: Russia
- Federal subject: Chelyabinsk Oblast
- Founded: 1743
- City status since: 1931

Government
  - Mayor: Maxim Avdulov
- Elevation: 370 m (1,210 ft)

Population (2010 Census)
  - Total: 407,775
  - Estimate (2025): 417,039 (+2.3%)
  - Rank: 44th in 2010

Administrative status
  - Subordinated to: City of Magnitogorsk
  - Capital of: City of Magnitogorsk

Municipal status
  - Urban okrug: Magnitogorsky Urban Okrug
  - Capital of: Magnitogorsky Urban Okrug
- Time zone: UTC+5 (MSK+2)
- Postal code: 455000
- Dialing code: +7 3519
- OKTMO ID: 75738000001
- Website: www.magnitogorsk.ru/index.php?lang=en

Magnitogorsk (Russian: Магнитого́рск, pronounced [məɡnʲɪtɐˈɡorsk], lit. '[city] of the magnetic mountain') is an industrial city in Chelyabinsk Oblast, Russia, on the eastern side of the southern Ural Mountains by the Ural River. Its population is currently 410,594 (2021 census).

Magnitogorsk was named after Mount Magnitnaya, a geological anomaly that once consisted almost completely of iron ore, around 55% to 60% iron. It is the second-largest city in Russia that is not the administrative centre of any federal subject or district, after Tolyatti. Magnitogorsk contains the largest iron and steel works in the country: Magnitogorsk Iron and Steel Works. The official motto of the city is "the place where Europe and Asia meet" (Russian: Место, где встречаются Европа и Азия), as the city straddles von Strahlenberg's line.

Magnitogorsk is one of a small number of planned socialist realist settlements established in the Soviet bloc during the Cold War (others including Nowa Huta in Poland, Havířov in Czechoslovakia and Eisenhüttenstadt in the GDR).

== History ==
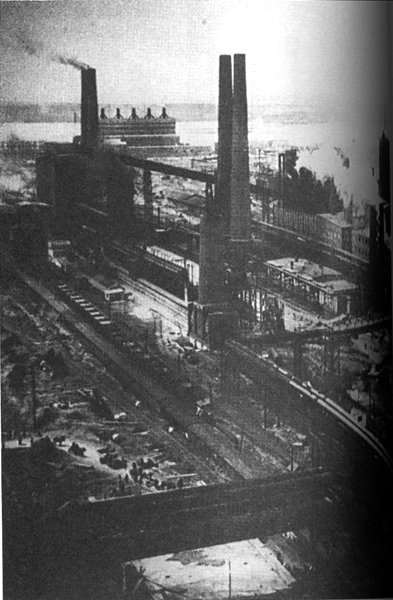
Magnitogorsk Iron and Steel Works, 1930s

=== Foundation ===
Magnitogorsk was founded in 1743 as part of the Orenburg Line of forts built during the reign of the Empress Elizabeth. By 1747, the settlement had grown large enough to justify the building of a small wooden chapel, later named "the Church of the Holy Trinity".

Russian iron-ore mining in this region dates back to 1752, when two entrepreneurs named Tverdysh and Myasnikov decided to explore the feasibility of mining in the area. They took advantage of the fact that Mount Magnitnaya did not belong to anyone at that time; they secured it for themselves by way of petition to Empress Elizabeth. In 1759, the petition was accepted, and they launched iron-ore production.

=== Growth ===
In 1928, a Soviet delegation arrived in Cleveland, Ohio, to discuss with American consulting company Arthur G. McKee a plan to set up in Magnitogorsk a copy of the U.S. Steel steel-mill in Gary, Indiana. The contract was increased four times, and eventually the new plant had a capacity of over four million tons annually.

It was a showpiece of Soviet achievement. Huge reserves of iron ore in the area made it a prime location to build a steel plant capable of challenging its Western rivals. However, a large proportion of the workforce, as ex-peasants, typically had few industrial skills and little industrial experience. To solve these issues, several hundred foreign specialists arrived to direct the work, including a team of architects headed by the German Ernst May.

According to the original plans, the city was to have followed the linear city design, with rows of similar superblock neighborhoods running parallel to the factory, with a strip of greenery, or greenbelt, separating them. Planners would align living and production spheres so as to minimize necessary travel time: workers would generally live in a sector of the residential band closest to the sector of the industrial band in which they worked.

However, by the time that May completed his plans for Magnitogorsk, construction of both factory and housing had already started. The sprawling factory and enormous cleansing lakes had left little room available for development, and May therefore had to redesign his settlement to fit the modified site. This modification resulted in a city being more "rope-like" than linear. Although the industrial area is concentrated on the left bank of the river Ural, and most residential complexes are on its right bank, the city inhabitants are still subjected to noxious fumes and factory smoke.

The city underwent rapid change in the 1930s when, according to Stalin's Five-Year-Plans, Magnitogorsk was to become a one-industry town modeled after two of the most advanced steel-producing cities in the United States at that time: Gary, Indiana, and Pittsburgh, Pennsylvania. At this time, hundreds of foreign experts streamed in to implement and direct the work.

The book Behind the Urals, by John Scott, documents the industrial development of Magnitogorsk during the 1930s. Scott discusses the fast-paced industrial and social developments during Stalin's first five-year plan and the rising paranoia of the Soviet regime preceding the Great Purge of the late 1930s. In 1931, it received the status of Город (lit. '[city]')

=== Closed city ===
In 1937, foreigners were told to leave, and Magnitogorsk was declared a closed city. There is little reliable information about events and development of the city during the closed period.

The city played an important role during World War II because it supplied much of the steel for the Soviet war effort. Furthermore, its strategic location east of the Ural Mountains made Magnitogorsk safe from seizure by the German Army.

=== Re-opening ===
During the perestroika movement of the Gorbachev administration, the closed-city status was removed, and foreigners were allowed to visit the city again. The years after perestroika brought a significant change in the life of the city; the Iron and Steel Plant was reorganized as a joint-stock company Magnitogorsk Iron and Steel Works (MISW or MMK), which helped with the reconstruction of the railway and the building of a new airport.

With the depletion of the substantial local iron-ore reserves, Magnitogorsk has to import raw materials from northern Kazakhstan.

==== Magnitogorsk building collapse ====
On December 31, 2018, an apartment block in the city of Magnitogorsk suffered a gas explosion and collapse which killed 39 of its residents, and injured 17 more.

== Administrative and municipal status ==
Within the framework of administrative divisions, it is incorporated as the City of Magnitogorsk—an administrative unit with the status equal to that of the districts. As a municipal division, the City of Magnitogorsk is incorporated as Magnitogorsky Urban Okrug.

== Transport ==
The city is connected by the Magnitogorsk International Airport and by a railway. Public transport includes trams, buses, and taxis. The city is ranked 8th in the world and 2nd in Russia for automobile congestion.

== Education and culture ==
There are two establishments of higher education in Magnitogorsk: Magnitogorsk State Technical University (MSTU) and Magnitogorsk State Conservatory (MSC). Magnitogorsk State University (MaSU), founded in 1932, in 2013 was merged with MSTU and ceased to exist as a separate university.

There are also three theatres: Pushkin Drama Theatre (the oldest in the city), the Opera and Ballet House, and the Puppet Theatre. The Church of the Ascension of the Lord opened in 2004.

Magnitogorsk is home to the Rear-front Memorial and the monument The First Tent dedicated to the first builders of the Magnitogorsk Iron and Steel Works.

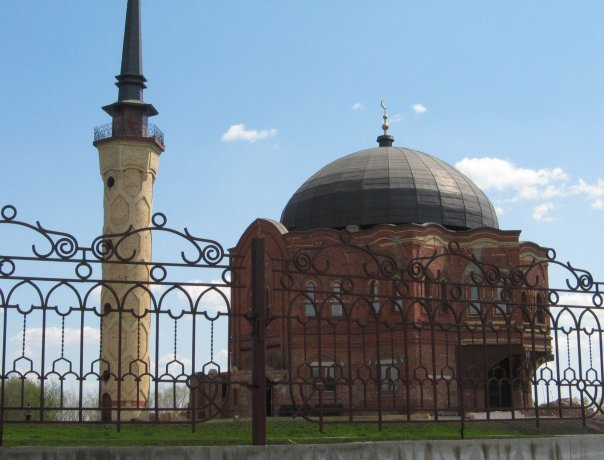
Great Mosque of Magnitogorsk

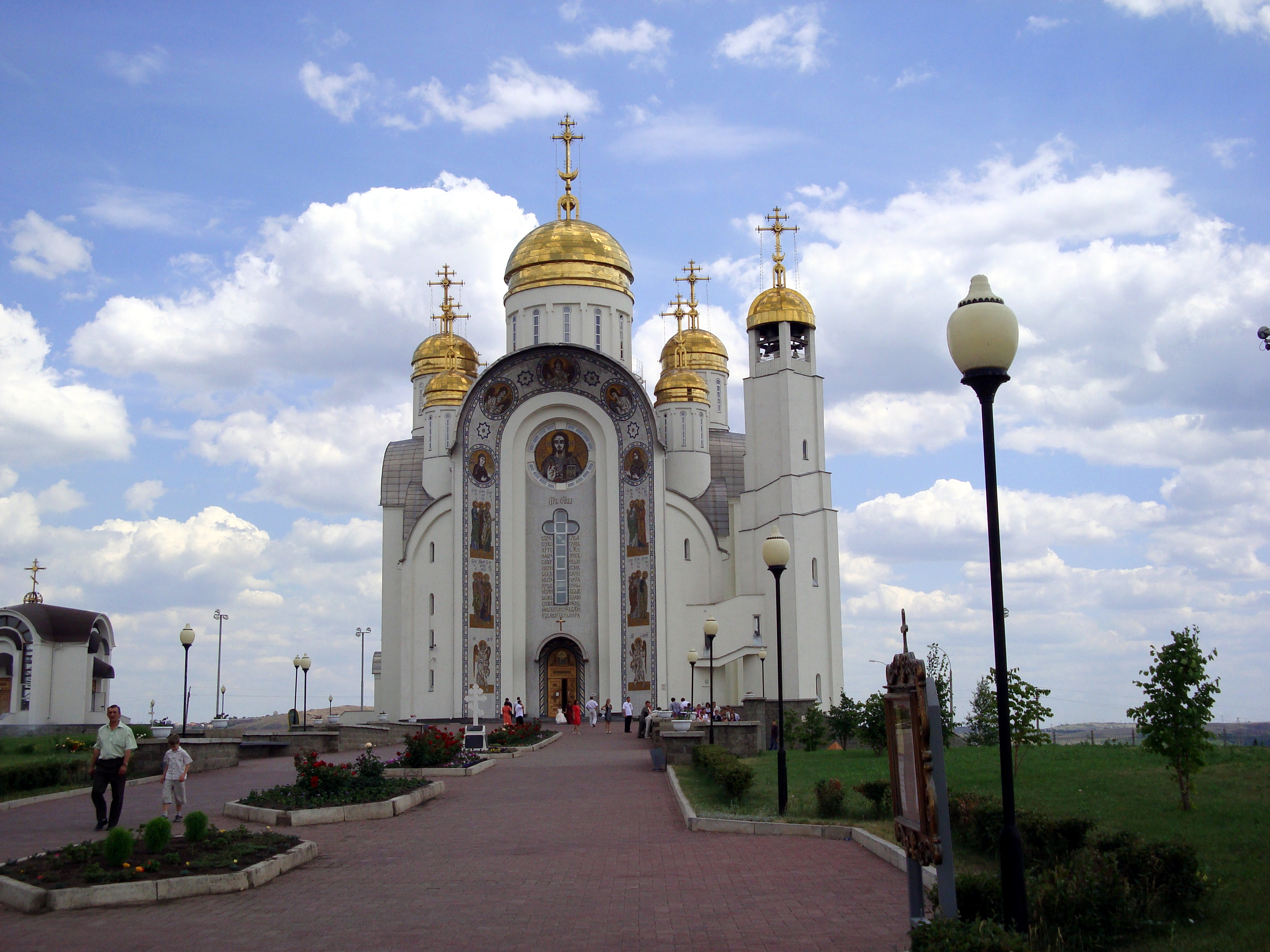
Magnitogorsk Church of the Ascension of the Lord

== Sports ==
Metallurg Magnitogorsk is an ice hockey team based in Magnitogorsk, playing in the Kontinental Hockey League. Evgeni Malkin (b. 1986) of the Pittsburgh Penguins, Ilya Samsonov (b. 1997) of HC Sochi, and Nikolai Kulemin (b. 1986), formerly of the New York Islanders, all used to play for the club and all are Magnitogorsk natives.

Metallurg Magnitogorsk won the Gagarin Cup in the 2013–14, 2015–16, and 2023–24 KHL seasons.

The town's football team is FC Magnitogorsk, playing in the Amateur Football League. Abzakovo is a popular mountain skiing base nearby, built by the MMK.

Several sports clubs are active in the city:

Club	Sport	Founded	Current league	League rank	Stadium
Metallurg Magnitogorsk	Ice hockey	1955	Kontinental Hockey League	1st	Arena Metallurg
Stalnye Lisy	Ice hockey	2009	Junior Hockey League	Jr. 1st	Arena Metallurg
Magnitka-Universitet	Basketball	?	Men's Basketball Supreme League	3rd	MGTU Sports Hall

== Geography ==
The city is located on the eastern side of the extreme southern extent of the Ural Mountains by the Ural River.

Magnitogorsk was mentioned in the Blacksmith Institute's 2007 survey of the world's worst polluted cities, placed in the report's unranked list of the 25 most-polluted places outside the top ten. Pollutants include lead, sulfur dioxide, heavy metals and other air pollutants. According to the local hospital, only 1% of all children living in the city are in good health. The Blacksmith Institute says that, according to a local newspaper report, "only 28% of infants born in 1992 were healthy, and only 27% had healthy mothers". However, according to Blacksmith Institute, plant managers have upgraded much of their equipment in recent years and emissions have been reduced by about 60%.

=== Climate ===
Magnitogorsk has a distinct four-season humid continental climate (Dfb) with relatively severe winters for the latitude. This climate type is typical for southerly Russian areas far from large bodies of water. The average July high is around 25 °C (77 °F) with lows of 13 °C (55 °F) with January averages ranging from −10 °C (14 °F) in daytime high to −18 °C (0 °F) in average low. Temperatures approaching 34 °C (93 °F) or above have been measured from May to September with real severe frosts below −36 °C (−33 °F) have been measured in all other months than that except transitional months April and October.

Climate data for Magnitogorsk (1991–2020, extremes 1948–present)
Month	Jan	Feb	Mar	Apr	May	Jun	Jul	Aug	Sep	Oct	Nov	Dec	Year
Record high °C (°F)	3.0 (37.4)	4.6 (40.3)	16.5 (61.7)	30.1 (86.2)	34.8 (94.6)	38.5 (101.3)	38.9 (102.0)	37.2 (99.0)	35.1 (95.2)	24.3 (75.7)	15.8 (60.4)	8.2 (46.8)	39.1 (102.4)
Mean daily maximum °C (°F)	−10.1 (13.8)	−8.4 (16.9)	−1.4 (29.5)	10.9 (51.6)	20.1 (68.2)	24.5 (76.1)	25.4 (77.7)	24.0 (75.2)	17.6 (63.7)	9.2 (48.6)	−1.3 (29.7)	−8.0 (17.6)	8.5 (47.3)
Daily mean °C (°F)	−14.3 (6.3)	−13.4 (7.9)	−6.3 (20.7)	4.7 (40.5)	13.0 (55.4)	17.9 (64.2)	19.3 (66.7)	17.4 (63.3)	11.1 (52.0)	3.9 (39.0)	−5.3 (22.5)	−12.1 (10.2)	3.0 (37.4)
Mean daily minimum °C (°F)	−18.6 (−1.5)	−18.2 (−0.8)	−11.0 (12.2)	−0.9 (30.4)	6.0 (42.8)	11.1 (52.0)	13.2 (55.8)	11.2 (52.2)	5.3 (41.5)	−0.7 (30.7)	−9.1 (15.6)	−16.2 (2.8)	−2.3 (27.9)
Record low °C (°F)	−42.8 (−45.0)	−42.8 (−45.0)	−36.1 (−33.0)	−23.9 (−11.0)	−8.9 (16.0)	−2.8 (27.0)	3.2 (37.8)	0.0 (32.0)	−11.1 (12.0)	−21.0 (−5.8)	−36.1 (−33.0)	−38.9 (−38.0)	−42.8 (−45.0)
Average precipitation mm (inches)	20 (0.8)	19 (0.7)	23 (0.9)	27 (1.1)	31 (1.2)	37 (1.5)	56 (2.2)	44 (1.7)	25 (1.0)	27 (1.1)	24 (0.9)	19 (0.7)	352 (13.9)
Average extreme snow depth cm (inches)	17 (6.7)	25 (9.8)	23 (9.1)	2 (0.8)	0 (0)	0 (0)	0 (0)	0 (0)	0 (0)	1 (0.4)	4 (1.6)	11 (4.3)	25 (9.8)
Average rainy days	0.1	0.2	2	7	12	13	15	13	12	9	4	0.4	88
Average snowy days	17	14	11	5	1	0.2	0	0.1	1	6	13	15	83
Average relative humidity (%)	83	80	80	67	58	60	67	68	69	73	81	82	72
Source: Pogoda.ru.net

== Demographics ==
Historical population
Year	Pop.	±%
1939	146,000	—
1959	311,101	+113.1%
1970	364,209	+17.1%
1979	406,074	+11.5%
1989	440,321	+8.4%
2002	418,545	−4.9%
2010	407,775	−2.6%
2021	410,594	+0.7%
Source: Census data

Ethnic composition (2010):.

Ethnicity	Population	Percentage
Russians	338,595	84.7%
Tatars	20,433	5.2%
Bashkirs	15,172	3.9%
Ukrainians	6,101	1.6%
Kazakhs	4,130	1.0%
Others	13,883	3.6%

== Twin towns – sister cities ==
Magnitogorsk is twinned with:

- Atyrau, Kazakhstan
- Gomel, Belarus
- Huai'an, China

== Notable people ==
- Evgeni Malkin (born 1986) - ice hockey player
- Ilya Samsonov (born 1997) - ice hockey player
- Vladilen Zakharov (born 1994) - ice hockey player
- Nikita Zhloba (born 1995) - ice hockey player

== See also ==
- Magnetic Mountain
