= Kadir =

Kadir, Kadeer, Qader, Qadir, Quadeer, or Quadir are the primary transliterations of two Arabic male given names (Arabic: قادر, also spelled Qaadir) and (Arabic: قدیر, also spelled Qadeer). These names are derived from Al-Qaadir, one of the names of God in Islam, meaning "The (All or Most) Capable", using the word قدير meaning "able/competent". Notable people with the name include:

== Given name ==
=== Kadeer ===
- Kadeer Ali (born 1983), English cricketer

=== Kadir ===
- Kadir Akbulut (born 1960), Turkish footballer and coach
- Kadir Arı (born 1994), Turkish footballer
- Kadir Arslan (born 1977), Turkish volleyball player
- Kadir Bal (born 1966), Turkish bureaucrat, diplomat, and engineer
- Kadir Barría (born 2007), Panamanian footballer
- Kadir Bekmezci (born 1985), Belgian footballer
- Kadir Caidi (born 1990), Italian footballer
- Kadir Çermik (born 1977), Turkish stage, film, television, and voice actor
- Kadir Cin (born 1987), Turkish volleyball player
- Kadir Doğulu (born 1982), Turkish actor
- Kadir Hodžić (born 1994), Bosnia-born Swedish footballer
- Kadir İnanır (1949–2026), Turkish film actor and director
- Kadir Irfan, Iraqi basketball player
- Kadir Kamal (born 2000), Turkish wrestler
- Kadir Kasirga (born 1975), Swedish-Kurdish politician
- Kadir Keleş (born 1988), Turkish footballer
- Kadir Koçdemir (born 1964), Turkish politician, author and former governor
- Kadir Mısıroğlu (1933–2019), Turkish Islamist writer and conspiracy theorist
- Kadir Nelson (born 1974), African American artist and illustrator
- Kadir Nurman (1933–2013), Turkish restaurateur
- Kadir Özcan (1952–2013), Turkish football player and coach
- Kadir Özkaya (born 1963), Turkish politician
- Kadir Rana (born 1961), Indian politician
- Kadir Seven (born 2003), Turkish footballer
- Kadir Sözen (born 1964), German-Turkish journalist and filmmaker
- Kadir Talabani (born 1986), Iraqi actor
- Kadir Timergazin (1913–1963), Soviet petroleum geologist
- Kadir Topbaş (1945–2021), Turkish architect and former Mayor of Istanbul
- Kadir Yahaya (born 1968), Singaporean footballer

=== Qadeer ===
- Qadeer Ahmed (born 1985), Pakistani-born Emirati cricketer

=== Qader ===
- Qader Eshpari (born 1967), Afghan singer

=== Qadir ===
- Al-Qadir (947–1031), Caliph of the later Abbasid caliphate
- Qadir Bakhsh (1946–2008), Pakistani footballer
- Qadir Bux Bedil (1814–1873), Indian Sufi poet and scholar
- Qadir Berdi, Khan of the Golden Horde
- Qadir Dilan (1930–1999), Iraqi Kurdish singer, songwriter and musician
- Qadir Huseynov (born 1986), Azerbaijani chess Grandmaster
- Qadir Ismail (born 2000), American footballer
- Qadir Magsi (born 1962), Pakistani politician
- Qadir Mandokhail, Pakistani politician
- Qadir Nayel, Pakistani politician
- Qadir Yar (1802–1892), Punjabi poet

=== Quadir ===
- Quadir Copeland (born 2003), American basketball player
- Quadir Maynard (born 1993), Bermudian footballer

== Surname ==
=== Kadeer ===
- Rebiya Kadeer (born 1947), Uyghur businesswoman

=== Kadir ===
- Elishay Kadir (born 1987), Israeli basketball player
- Foued Kadir (born 1983), Algerian footballer
- Khandan Kadir (born 1969), Afghan extrajudicial prisoner of the United States
- Zunun Kadir (1911–1989), Uyghur writer

=== Qadir ===
- Asghar Qadir (born 1946), Pakistani mathematician
- Ghulam Qadir (1767–1789), Afghan Rohilla leader
- Kamal Qadir (born 1958), Kurdish activist
- Zahir Qadir (born 1973), Afghan politician

== See also ==
- Khadir (disambiguation)
- Ghadir (disambiguation)
- Abdul Qadir
- Ghadir class submarine, Iranian submarine capable of launching torpedoes and rockets
- Qader (missile), Iranian anti-ship cruise missile
- Kadyr
