= Bashkir phonology =

This article deals with the phonology and phonetics of the Bashkir language and its varieties.

== Consonantism ==
Bashkir language has the widest range of places of articulation of consonants out of all Turkic languages. Despite lacking affricates that are very common throughout Turkic languages, the Bashkir language still possesses a relatively high amount of phonemes.

Below is the chart of consonant phonemes. Phonemes only found in loanwords (such as the glottal stop /ʔ/) or allophones are not included.

Consonant phonemes of standard Bashkir language
		Bilabial	Dental	Alveolar	Post-Alveolar	Palatal	Velar	Uvular	Glottal
Nasals		/m/	/n/				/ŋ/		
Plosives	Voiceless	/p/	/t/				/k/	/q/	
Plosives	Voiced	/b/	/d/				/g/		
Fricatives	Voiceless		/θ/	/s/	/ʃ/				/h/
Fricatives	Voiced		/ð/	/z/	/ʒ/			/ʁ/	
Trill				/r/					
Approximants				/l/		/j/	/w/		

Most common foreign phonemes include the following:

- Glottal stop /ʔ/ in Arabic loanwords: мәсьәлә /mæs.ʔæˈlæ/ "problem, issue, matter"
  - It is only highlighted in careful and educated speech, a lot of native speakers usually omit it completely.
- Voiceless uvular fricative /χ/ in Perso-Arabic (and sometimes Russian) loanwords: хаҡ /χäq/ "price, value"
  - This is a notable minimal pair with the phoneme /h/: һаҡ /häq/ means "safe"

The most distinct feature of Bashkir consonantism among other Turkic languages is complete loss of affricates and debuccalization. Common Turkic /s/ has split into /h/ in onset and /θ/ in coda, creating unique (among Turkic languages) phonemes. Another notable feature of Bashkir consonantism is lenition of /z/ and intervocal /d/ into /ð/. Although both phonemes still exist in Bashkir, /z/ is extremely rare.

Consonant gemination is not present in Bashkir, although double consonants are still possible on morpheme boundaries.

Voiceless plosives are usually aspirated, although not very strongly, and some vowels (specifically the reduced series) block aspiration. Aspiration is also often lost word-finally. Unlike Tatar, the distinction between glottal fricative /h/ and velar/uvular fricative /χ/ is highlighted, even in northwestern dialects, despite them lacking the phoneme /h/ in native words. However under the influence of Russian language education and lack of Bashkir language usage outside home and family, a lot of speakers merge either one or both of those (in some cases also /ɣ/) into [x] (sometimes with further hypercorrection into [h]).

=== Consonant assimilation ===
Most phonemes change their articulation depending on front or back vowels:

- Velar nasal /ŋ/ becomes uvular [ɴ]: киң [kʰʲiŋ] "wide" vs. моң [mʊ̆ɴ] "melancholy; tune";
  - The uvular [ɴ] when followed by uvular /ʁ/ is either completely dropped, leaving its only trace in the vowel nasalisation (and possibly length too): таңға [tä̃(ː)ˈʁä] "to the dawn", or kept in place, assimilating the uvular fricative /ʁ/ into uvular plosive [ɢ]: таңға [tä̃ɴˈɢä] "to the dawn".
- Labiovelar approximant /w/ becomes labiopalatal [ɥ] near front vowels;
- Velar plosives /k/ and /g/ become [c] and [ɟ] near front vowels (except the reduced series) and [q] and [ʁ] near back vowels;
  - The consonants /q/ and /ʁ/ have developed as distinct phonemes enough to "break" the vowel harmony rules, so unlike most Turkic languages, Bashkir language does have native words containing /q/ and /ʁ/ before front vowels. Therefore, these consonants are most commonly analysed as distinct phonemes.
- The lateral approximant /l/ is pronounced as a velarized lateral alveolar approximant [l̴] near back vowels;
- The post-alveolar /ʃ/ and /ʒ/ are pronounced as retroflex [ʂ] and [ʐ] near back vowels.

The consonant /n/ usually does not assimilate into [ŋ] when followed by a velar consonant, and is still pronounced as [n] anyway. There are even minimal pairs of such instances: унға [ũnˈʁä] "to 10" vs. уңға [ũɴˈʁä] (or [ũɴˈɢä]) "to the right".

==== Intervocalic position ====
Bashkir consonants often change their quality in intervocalic position. Both voiceless and voiced plosives get voiced and lenited, so /p/ and /b/ become [β], /k/ and /g/ (rarely) become [ɣ̞] or [ɰ], and /q/ becomes /ʁ/. /t/ and /d/ are exempt from lenition — /t/ in itself is stable enough, and all instances of /d/ where it could be lenited have already evolved into /ð/ (even in some loanwords):

- Arabic مَدِينَة /maˈdiːnah/ — Bashkir Мәҙинә /mæ.ðiˈnæ/ "Medina"
- Tatar идән /iˈdæn/ — Bashkir иҙән /iˈðæn/ "floor" (cognates, not a loanword)

Intervocalic position most commonly occurs during suffixation, so a plosive at the end of a word (always voiceless except loanwords) gets voiced if the suffix starts with a vowel:

- китап /kiˈtäp/ "book" — китабым [kʲi.täˈβɤm] "my book"

=== Glottal fricative ===
The glottal fricative /h/ is unusually stable in Bashkir language. While in most languages of the world it is often subject to lenition or even completely dropped, in Bashkir language it remains clearly pronounced even intervocally, not even getting voiced to [ɦ]. Moreover, in eastern dialects (historical Argayash and Yalan cantons), the consonants /θ/ and /ð/ are debuccalized into /h/ in syllable coda, completely eliminating the phoneme /θ/ and limiting /ð/ to the few words that start with /ð/.

However, in northwestern dialects, the /s/-/h/ shift did not occur, so this phoneme only exists in loanwords from Arabic and Persian. The Karaidel subdialect /s/ corresponds to both /h/ and /s/ of standard Bashkir.

== Vocalism ==
=== Historical shifts ===
Historically, the Proto-Turkic mid vowels have raised from mid to high, whereas the Proto-Turkic high vowels have become the Bashkir reduced mid series. (The same shifts have also happened in Tatar.) However, in most dialects of Bashkir, this shift is not as prominent as in Tatar.

Vowel	Common Turkic	Tatar	Bashkir	Gloss
*e /ɛ/	*et	it	it /it/	'meat'
*ö /œ/	*söz	süz	hüź /hʏ̝ð/	'word'
*o /ɔ/	*sol	sul	hul /huɫ/	'left'
*i /i/	*it	et	et /ɪt/	'dog'
*ï /ɤ/	*qïz	qız	qıź /qɯð/	'girl'
*u /u/	*qum	qom	qom /qʊm/	'sand'
*ü /y/	*kül	köl	köl /kʏ̞l/	'ash'

It is also important to note that the shifts didn't flip the Bashkir and Tatar vocalism — the reduced series of both languages (albeit Tatar reduced series being closer to Chuvash reduced series instead) do match their articulation in Kazakh language, for example:

- Kazakh ұн /ʊ̆n/ — Bashkir он /ʊ̆n/ "flour"
- Kazakh бір /bɪr/ — Bashkir бер /bɪr/ "one"
- Kazakh үш /ʏʃ/ — Bashkir өс /ʏ̞s/ "three"

Therefore it is more correct to note that the non-reduced series raised from mid to close in Bashkir and Tatar, and the near-close vowels remained in place, making their relative articulation more open than the non-reduced counterparts.

=== Vowel phonemes ===
Bashkir has nine native vowels, and one borrowed vowel found in Arabic and Persian loanwords.

Below is the chart of vowel phonemes. Dialectal vowels are marked with a dagger †, foreign vowels are marked with a double dagger ‡. Phonemes only found in loanwords (such as Russian /o/) or allophones are not included:

	Front		Back	
	Unrounded	Rounded	Unrounded	Rounded
Close	/i/		/ɨ/^{‡}	/u/
Near-close	/ɪ/	/ʏ/	/ɯ̽/	/ʊ/
Mid		/ø/		
Open	/æ/		/ä/	[ɑ]^{†}

There is no vowel length distinction, though all mid and near-close vowels are shorter than the rest and somewhat less stable.

The vowels /ʏ/ and /ø/ are most commonly realized as [ʏ̝] and [ʏ̞] respectively. For some speakers, they might even be completely identical, with only difference remaining in palatalization (/ʏ/ doesn't palatalize, /ø/ does) and/or morphology (/ʏ/ is suffixed with the variants containing /ɪ/, whereas /ø/ is suffixed with the variants containing /ø/). See more at Vowel harmony section below.

The foreign vowel /ɨ/ is sometimes transcribed as /ɯ/, and the native vowel /ɯ/ is sometimes transcribed as /ɤ/. However, their true articulations are most commonly [ɨ] for the former and [ɯ̽] for the latter. The vowel /ɨ/ only occurs in Arabic and Persian loanwords, such as:

- Bashkir тарих /täˈrɨχ/ "history", from Arabic تَارِيخ /taːriːχ/
- Bashkir синыф /sɨˈnɯ̽f/ "class", from Arabic صنف /sˤinf/

=== Vowel harmony ===
Native Bashkir words follow a system of vowel harmony, meaning that they incorporate either exclusively back vowels (/ä/, /ɯ̽/, /ʊ/, /u/), or exclusively front vowels (/æ/, /ɪ/, /i/, /ø/, /ʏ/), as, for example, in the words бысаҡ ('knife') and төрмә ('prison').

The vowels /u/ and /ʏ/ only occur in the initial syllable.

The vowels /ʊ̆/ and /ø̆/ assimilate the /ɯ̆/ and /ɪ̆/ in the following syllables into becoming the rounded counterparts, and this is reflected in writing. For example, the word өй "house" when suffixed by possessive -ҙең becomes өйҙөң. According to Kiyekbayev, they also assimilate the following /ä/ and /æ/, with each following syllable being less and less rounded. For example: олатайҙар /ʊ̆.ɫɑ.tɑjˈðɑr/ [ʊ̆.ɫɒ.tɑjˈðär] "uncles/granddads".

=== Allophones ===
Most Bashkir vowels are rather stable in their articulation, with few allophony. The most notable allophone is the vowel /ø̆/ becoming [y] when followed by /j/: өй /ʏj/ [yj] "house". Other allophones only affect words borrowed from Russian.

Some vowels have a broad articulation range:

- The vowel /ɯ̽/ might sometimes be realized as [ɤ̆]
- The vowel /ɪ/ might sometimes be realized either as [ɛ̆], or as [ĭ].
- The vowels /i/ and /ʊ/ might sometimes be realized as [e] and [o], especially in southern dialects (see section below).

== Phonotactics ==
=== Syllables ===
The maximal syllable structure is (C)V(C)(C). Although Bashkir words can take multiple final consonants, the possibilities are limited. Multi-syllable words are syllabified to have C.CV or V.CV syllable splits. C.V split is disallowed. V.V split is only found in loanwords, and is usually broken down by vowel hiatus.

The main rules of Bashkir syllable structure are as follows:

- All syllables have a nucleus.
- No diphthongs (/j/ and /w/ are always treated as consonants).
- No word-initial /ŋ/, /r/, /θ/, /ʒ/. The consonants /ʃ/, /p/, /ʁ/ and /ð/ only occur word-initially in loanwords (including the rather frequent word ҙур /ður/ "big", which is borrowed from Persian). No consonant clusters are allowed in syllable onset.
- No /b/, /d/, /g/ in coda (see final-obstruent devoicing). Historical /ʁ/ in coda has evolved to /w/ in most cases. /h/ is also not allowed in coda, although some eastern subdialects debuccalize /ð/ and /θ/ to /h/, creating syllable-final /h/.
- All other consonants can appear in syllable coda. Complex codas are limited by a set of consonant clusters, most of which consist of a sonorant and a voiceless plosive.

=== Onset ===
The syllable onset allows most consonants, with the exception of /ŋ/, /r/, /θ/, /ʒ/. The consonants /ʃ/, /p/, /ʁ/ and /ð/ only occur word-initially in loanwords (including the rather frequent word ҙур /ður/ "big", which is borrowed from Persian). No consonant clusters are allowed in syllable onset.

=== Nucleus ===
The syllable nucleus can contain any of the 9 vowel phonemes, although the close rounded vowels can not occur in non-initial and non-final syllables. Due to the vowel harmony rules, the only way vowels in non-initial syllables differ phonemically are by closedness or openness, effectively reducing the phonemic vowel count in non-initial syllables to 2.

=== Coda ===
All voiced consonants (not including nasals) get devoiced word-finally and before a voiceless consonant. Voiced uvular fricative /ʁ/, can not occur word-finally at all. Syllabification avoids coda as much as possible, unless the next consonant has an onset.

== Dialectal varieties ==
The geographical distribution of Bashkir dialects. Yellow shows northwestern, green shows eastern and pink shows southern dialects. Note that some dialects are present outside Bashkortostan, most notably eastern dialect, that is spoken mostly in Chelyabinsk and Kurgan oblasts (historical Arğayaş and Yalan cantons).

Bashkir language has 3 dialect groups: northwestern, southern and eastern. The standard language is based on southern and eastern dialects. All dialects are mutually intelligible, with some slight differences in phonology and sometimes in vocabulary.

The northwestern dialects are considered by most Tatar linguists to form a dialect continuum with Tatar language. The southern dialects are considered by some Bashkir linguists to form a dialect continuum with Nogai and Kazakh languages.

=== Northwestern dialects ===
The northwestern Bashkir dialect is subject to intense debate over its status as a dialect of Bashkir or Tatar languages, and the debates are a source of confusion in the education system in the region.

There are very few differences between standard Bashkir and Tatar languages. The most prominent differences in phonology are the following:

- Bashkir /h/ and /θ/ correspond to Tatar /s/: Bashkir һин /hin/ vs. Tatar син /sin/ "you (singular)", Bashkir баҫ /bäθ/ vs. Tatar бас /bɒs/ "stomp (imperative)";
- Bashkir /s/ corresponds to Tatar /ɕ/: Bashkir сәй /sæj/ vs. Tatar чәй /ɕæj/ "tea";
- Tatar /ʑ/ corresponds to Bashkir /j/: Tatar җәй /ʑæj/ vs. Bashkir йәй /jæj/ "summer".

Northwestern dialect has roughly the same differences from standard Bashkir, albeit /ɕ/ and /ʑ/ are usually articulated softer than Tatar sounds, as [ç] and [ʝ]. Some subdialects of Northwestern Bashkir, such as Karaidel subdialect, differ slightly more from Tatar. Some subdialects, such as Ğäynä, spoken in Perm Krai, differ slightly more from standard Bashkir (although this particular dialect differs significantly from both in vocabulary, preserving a notable layer of Uralic substrate).

Other notable features, not necessarily shared with standard Tatar language, include:

- Merging of /jn/ and /jl/ sequences into palatal(-ized) [ɲ] and [ʎ]: уйнарға /uj.närˈʁä/ [u.ɲärˈʁä] "to play", уйларға /uj.ɫärˈʁä/ [u.ʎärˈʁä] "to think"
- Merging of /øj/ into [ʉ]: өйрәтергә /øjˌræ.tɪrˈgæ/ [ʉˌɾæ.tɪɾˈɟæ] (standard Bashkir [yjˌɾæ.tɪɾˈɟæ]) "to teach"
- Rounding of /ä/ to [ɑ] in initial syllable, with gradual unrounding with each following syllable: балаларға [bɒ.ɫɑ̹.ɫɑrˈʁä] "to the children"

There are also slight differences in morphology between standard Bashkir and Tatar. Northwestern Bashkir has the same morphology as standard Bashkir, and so does the eastern dialect of Tatar language, spoken along the border with Bashkortostan and by the Tatars in Bashkortostan itself.

=== Southern dialects ===
The southern Bashkir dialects do not differ from standard Bashkir language in phonology, as they were the basis for standard Bashkir phonology. There are only slight differences in morphology. It is commonly perceived by Bashkir people to be the "purest" form of Bashkir language.

Some southern subdialects might have a slight reverse to the Northern Kipchak vowel shift (either as the influence from nearby Kazakh speakers, or as a remnant of the older vocalism). Therefore, the close vowels /i/ and /u/ might be articulated as [e] and [o] respectively. Some lexical items also might be indicative of preserving the older system, for example the dialectal йоҡ /jʊ̆q/, often pronounced as [joq] instead of the standard юҡ /juq/ for negation.

One notable exception is the Tuq-Soran subdialect, spoken outside Bashkortostan in historical Tuq-Soran canton^{(ru)}, as well as in Bashkir villages in Samara and Saratov oblasts. Its most notable features include:

- Usage of interdental /θ/ in place of many other sibilants: башҡортса /baʃ.qʊrtˈsa/ — башҡортҫа /baʃ.qʊrtˈθa/ "Bashkir (language)"; һөйләү /højˈlæw/ — ҫөйләү /θøjˈlæw/ "to speak, speech"
- Voicing of word-initial plosives, much like in Oghuz languages: түңәрәк /tʏ.ŋæˈræk/ — дүгәрәк /dʏ.gæˈræk/ "circle"

=== Eastern dialects ===
The eastern Bashkir dialects differ insignificantly from standard Bashkir language in phonology and morphology. These dialects were the basis for standard Bashkir morphology.

Key phonological differences are:

- The consonants /θ/ and /ð/ are debuccalized into /h/ in syllable coda (mostly in historical Yalan canton), completely eliminating the phoneme /θ/ and limiting /ð/ to the few words that start with /ð/: яҙһа /jäðˈhä/ — яһһа /jähˈhä/ "if he/she writes";
  - In some subdialects (mostly in historical Argayash canton), the consonants /θ/ and /ð/ are instead merged into /θ/ in syllable coda, limiting /ð/ to the few words with intervocal /ð/, and even fewer words that start with /ð/: ҡыҙҙар /qɯðˈðär/ — ҡыҫтар /qɯθˈtär/ "girls", but иҙән /iˈðæn/ is unchanged.
- The consonant /j/ undergoes fortition word-initially, changing into [ʝ] or [ʒ], though this change is practically random and almost never changes all words starting with /j/ — the same speaker might pronounce these words with a [ʒ], with a [ʝ] and with a [j], all in one sentence.
- The sequence of bilabial plosives and a fricative in a single syllable (most notably the 1st person plural suffix -беҙ /bɪð/) are merged into [f]: китәбеҙ /kiˈtæ.bɪ̆ð/ [kʲiˈtæf].
  - By careful inspection, this merge seems to have formed by the lenition of /b/ to [β] due to its intervocal position, then due to the reduced /ɪ̆/ vowel (which morphologically doesn't get stressed) and final-obstruent devoicing of /ð/ into [θ] the two consonants got clustered into [β̩̊θ], which further merged into [ɸ] or the more stable [f].

== Summary ==
=== Consonants ===
Below is the chart of consonant phones, with all the allophones, dialectal and foreign phonemes. Allophones are marked with square brackets, dialectal sounds with a dagger † and foreign phonemes with a double dagger ‡.

		Bilabial	Dental	Alveolar	Post-Alveolar	Palatal	Velar	Uvular	Glottal
Nasals		/m/	/n/			[ɲ]^{†}	/ŋ/	[ɴ]	
Plosives	Voiceless	/p/	/t/			[c]	/k/	/q/	/ʔ/^{‡}
Plosives	Voiced	/b/	/d/			[ɟ]	/g/	[ɢ]	
Fricatives	Voiceless	[ɸ]	/θ/	/s/	/ʃ/ [ʂ]	/ɕ/^{†}	[ɣ]	/χ/^{‡}	/h/
Fricatives	Voiced	[β]	/ð/	/z/	/ʒ/ [ʐ]	/ʑ/^{†}	[x]	/ʁ/	
Trill/Flap				/r/ [ɾ]					
Approximants						/j/ [ɥ]	/w/		
Lateral approximants				/l/		[ʎ]^{†}	[ɫ]		

=== Vowels ===
Below is the chart of vowel phones, with all the allophones, dialectal and foreign phonemes. Allophones are marked with square brackets, dialectal sounds with a dagger † and foreign phonemes with a double dagger ‡.

	Front		Central		Back	
	Unrounded	Rounded	Unrounded	Rounded	Unrounded	Rounded
Close	/i/	[y]	/ɨ/^{‡}	[ʉ]^{†}		/u/
Near-close	/ɪ̆/	/ʏ/			/ɯ̆/	/ʊ̆/
Mid		/ø̆/				
Open	/æ/		/ä/		[ɑ]^{†}	

== See also ==
- Bashkir language
- Kipchak languages
- Vowel harmony
- Turkic languages
