= Kadirov =

Kadirov (masculine) is a patronymic surname derived from the given name Qadir. It may refer to the following notable people:

- Bakhodur Kadirov, Tajikistani wrestler
- Hatam Kadirov (died 1942), Soviet soldier and prisoner-of-war

== See also ==
- Kadyrov
