= Miassky (inhabited locality) =

Miassky (Russian: Миа́сский; masculine), Miasskaya (Миа́сская; feminine), or Miasskoye (Миа́сское; neuter) is the name of several rural localities in Russia:

- Miassky (rural locality), a settlement in Bayramgulovsky Selsoviet of Argayashsky District of Chelyabinsk Oblast
- Miasskoye, a selo in Miassky Selsoviet of Krasnoarmeysky District of Chelyabinsk Oblast
