= Miassky =

Miassky (masculine), Miasskaya (feminine), or Miasskoye (neuter) may refer to:

- Miassky Urban Okrug, a municipal formation, which the City of Miass, Chelyabinsk Oblast, Russia, is incorporated as
- Miassky (inhabited locality) (Miasskaya, Miasskoye), name of several rural localities in Russia
