= Kadir Timergazin =

Russian geologist (1913–1963)

Кадыр Рахимович Тимергазин Ҡадыр Рәхим улы Тимерғазин
- Born: 5 February 1913; Sabaktykul, Shadrinsky Uyezd, Perm Governorate, Russian Empire
- Died: 4 April 1963 (aged 50); Moscow, Soviet Union
- Education: Kazan (Volga region) Federal University
- Known for: Petroleum geology
- Awards: Order of the Badge of Honour; Order of the Patriotic War; Order of the Red Star; Medal "For the Liberation of Warsaw"; Medal "For the Capture of Berlin"; Medal "For the Victory over Germany in the Great Patriotic War 1941–1945"
- Scientific career
- Fields: Geology
- Workplaces: Institute of Geology, Ufa Scientific Center, Russian Academy of Sciences

Kadir Rakhimovich Timergazin (Russian: Кадыр Рахимович Тимергазин; Bashkir: Ҡадыр Рәхим улы Тимерғазин; 5 February [O.S. 18 February ] 1913 – 4 April 1963) was a Soviet petroleum geologist and a professor of geological-mineralogical science.

== Biography ==
Kadir was a Doctor of Sciences who was involved with the Soviet government as a scientist and a public and state figure. He was Chairman of the Supreme Council of the Bashkir Autonomous Soviet Socialist Republic.

Timergazin was the eighth and last child of a poor peasant family, and as a youth he was a shepherd and farmer. At age 14, he was sent to the Argayashsky District boarding school. In 1930 Timergazin entered the University of Kazan, graduating from its Faculty of Geology in 1935.

In 1935 there was the scientific group of laboratories created in Ufa for decision of appearing problems (structure and bedding conditions of oil and gas containing rocks, choosing of reconnaissance directions and so on). There were geo-chemical, oil, bitumen laboratories, producers’ geology department in its structure. Here the prominent specialists of oil-refining industry began their scientific work, such as A.A.Trofimuk, K.R.Timergazin, A.J.Vissarionova, V.A.Balaev, A.F.Shamov, M.F.Mikrjukov, P.S.Porfirjev and others.

Two years later, he began working as a geologist in the laboratory of experimental-industrial geology and petrography of the Central Research Laboratory. From 1937 to 1941, Timergazin headed the Central Research Laboratory of the Geological Study Association of the Soviet oil ministry.

In 1941 Timergazin joined the Red Army, commanding an artillery platoon on the Transbaikal front in Mongolia before his transfer to a two-year military law academy in Ashgabat. From 1943 to 1945, he served in the 397th Infantry Division of the 1st Belorussian Front. Timergazin participated in the liberation of Belarus, the Baltic states, Poland, East Germany, the occupation of Berlin and the meeting with Allied troops at the Elbe, receiving orders and medals for his service. He spent an additional year of military service in Germany from 1945 to 1946.

In 1946-1947 Timergazin directed the Central Research Laboratory Association, the basis of the Ufa Petroleum Research Institute (UfNII). From 1947 to 1950, he headed the Laboratory of Lithology and Geochemistry at UfNII. In 1949 Timergazin defended his thesis, "The terrigenous rocks of the Devonian-Bavlinsky Tuimazinsky oil region." In 1950-1951, he was head of the Geological Department of UfNII before directing the Mining and Geology Institute of the BASSR until 1953 and heading the Laboratory of Petroleum Geology, Mining and Geological Institute (now the Institute of Geology, Ufa Scientific Center of the Russian Academy of Sciences).

In 1958, Timergazin became a Doctor of Geological and Mineralogical Sciences; his dissertation was "Pre-Devonian Formation of Western Bashkiria and Its Oil and Gas Prospects". From 1959 to 1963, he was Deputy Chairman of the Supreme Council of the BASSR. In 1960 Timergazin became a professor, and in 1963 a Deputy to the Supreme Soviet of the RSFSR. On 4 April that year, he died of nephritis.

== Achievements ==
Timergazin was one of the first to describe the lithology of the western slope of the southern Ural Mountains, conducting a comprehensive study of Permian coal and rock and Devonian sediments in the Tuymazinsky District. His work influenced the exploration of oil and gas fields in the USSR. During his career, Timergazin authored 70 scientific papers.

== Awards ==
- Order of the Badge of Honour (1948 and 1957)
- Order of the Patriotic War
- Order of the Red Star
- Medal "For the Liberation of Warsaw"
- Medal "For the Capture of Berlin"
- Medal "For the Victory over Germany in the Great Patriotic War 1941–1945" (1951)
- Honoured Scientist of the RSFSR (June 6, 1957) "for his great contribution to the development of geological science"

== Books ==
1. Essays on the History of Bashkir Oil. Ufa Bashgosizdat, 1956.
2. Pre-Devonian Formation of Western Bashkiria and Prospects for Oil and Gas. Ufa: Mining and Geology. Inst BFAN USSR, 1959. 331.
3. Stratigraphic Scheme of Devonian Deposits of Volga-Ural Oil: Unified Design Scheme (ed.). Ufa: Univ. BFAN USSR, 1959, p. 21.
4. Bashkir Oil: History and Prospects for Development. - Ufa Bashknigoizdat, 1959.
5. Ancient Deposits of Western Bashkiria (ed.). Academy of Sciences of the USSR, 1960.
6. Selected Works, Book 1: Terrigenous rocks of the Devonian Bavlinsky-Tuimazinsky Oil Region. Ufa: Guillem, 2000. ISBN 5-7501-0188-6.
7. Selected Works, Book 2: Pre-Devonian Formation of Western Bashkiria and Prospects for Oil and Gas. Ufa: Guillem, 2006.
8. TIMERGAZIN, K. (1955). O GENEZISE SULFIDOV V DEVONSKIKH I BOLEE DREVNIKH PORODAKH NA VOSTOKE RUSSKOI PLATFORMY. DOKLADY AKADEMII NAUK SSSR, 105(2), 345-346.

== Sources ==
- Professor KR Timergazin in the memoirs of contemporaries. R. G. Kuzeev. Ufa, Bashkir: Prince Publishing House, 1984.
