= Khadar =

Khadar may refer to:

- Khadar, Fars, a village in Jahrom Country, Fars Province, Iran
- Khadar, Razavi Khorasan, a city in Torqabeh and Shandiz County, Razavi Khorasan Province, Iran
- a terms for certain alluvial soils
- Khaddar or Khadi, homespun cotton cloth from India

== People with the surname ==
- Abdul Khadar (1951–2002), Pashtun leader in Afghanistan
- U. T. Khadar, Indian politician

== See also ==
- Khadir (disambiguation)
