= Kadyr =

Kadyr is a given name, a variant of Kadir. Notable people with the name include:

- Kadyr Baikenov (1944–2022), Kazakh engineer and politician
- Kadyr Gulyamov (born 1945), Uzbek politician
- Kadyr Myrza Ali (1935–2011), Kazakh poet
- Kadyr Yusupov (1951–2024), Uzbek diplomat

== See also ==
- Kadyrov
