= Argayash National Okrug =

Coordinates: 55°29′N 60°53′E

Argayash National Okrug Аргаяшский национальный округ Arƣajaş milli okrugь
- Autonomous Okrug of the Soviet Union
- 1934
- Capital: Argayash
- Area
  - 1933: 6,772 km^{2} (2,615 sq mi)
- Population
  - 1933: 88,900
- History
  - Argayash Canton of the Bashkir ASSR established: 15 November 1917
  - Established: 17 January 1934
  - Disestablished: 17 November 1934
- Political subdivisions: 2 raions

The Argayash National Okrug (Russian: Аргая́шский национа́льный о́круг Argajašskij nacional'nyj okrug; Bashkir: Арғаяш милли округы, romanized: Arğayaş milli okrugı; (Arƣajaş milli okrugь (Note: The Bashkir language used the Latin script from 1930 until 1940.))) was a national okrug for the Bashkirs of the Chelyabinsk Oblast of the RSFSR in the Soviet Union. It existed from January to November 1934.

== History ==
On 15 November 1917, Trans-Ural Bashkiria was added to the nascent Bashkurdistan by decision of the Bashkir Central Soviet as Argayash Canton. Although an exclave surrounded by the RSFSR proper, this canton existed as an administrative and territorial unit of the Bashkir Autonomous Socialist Soviet Republic until 1930. In that year, the cantonal system of administration was eliminated and the former Argayash Canton was organized as two raions, Argayash and Kunashak, while remaining a part of the Bashkir ASSR.

On 17 January 1934, the Ural Oblast of the RSFSR which surrounded the former Argayash Canton was disbanded by the All-Russian Central Executive Committee and divided into three new oblasts, one of which was Chelyabinsk Oblast. On the same day, the area was transferred to this new oblast as the Argayash National Okrug.

Later that year, on 17 November 1934, the All-Russian Central Executive Committee liquidated the national okrug and the area was thenceforth administered as a normal part of Chelyabinsk Oblast. There was some popular interest in reviving the okrug in the Argayash and Kunashak areas of the oblast in the late 1980s and early 1990s, but no official action was taken and the area remains a part of Chelyabinsk Oblast, now a part of the Russian Federation.
