= Tatar–Russian code-switching =

Mixing of languages among bilingual inhabitants of Tatarstan

Tatar–Russian code-switching is a code-switching language of the urban population of Tatarstan, and is spoken predominantly among bilingual Tatars. It is based on the Tatar language, but many spoken forms are from Russian language. In some cases one can start a phrase in Tatar and end it in Russian or vice versa. Sometimes only single Russian words are incorporated into Tatar speech, or vice versa. Speaking Tatar words, one can use Russian order of words.

The same situation is similar to Bashkir–Russian, Chuvash–Russian and many other code-switching of Russian minorities.

== Usage of code-switching ==
Tatar–Russian code-switching is used in several cases:

- Russian remains the most common language in urban areas of Tatarstan and other Tatar-populated areas. Several generations of Tatars speak fluent Russian. Often, when constructing a sentence, they use Russian order of words. Being an inflexional language, Russian differs from Tatar, which is an agglutinative language. Even when speaking Tatar conjunctive words that don't exist in Turkic languages are inserted. Even archaic literary language used Arabic and Persian conjunctive words, not all of them are used in modern urban speech. Most of urban Tatars graduated from Russian schools and they have no idea how use some constructions other than in Russian, especially if those constructions were not in use in Tatar-speaking generations. Examples are mojet, naverno, potomu chto, nüjäli (neuzheli), konechno instead of bälki, ixtimal, çönki, çınlap ta, älbättä ('maybe', 'probably', 'because', 'really?', 'of course'). Brat is used to describe all brothers, although Tatar has two different words for older and younger brothers: abí and ene correspondingly.
- Some concepts have appeared only after Russian language became dominant. Even when those words have counterparts in the literary Tatar language, they are traditionally used in Russian form. Example: Arkhitekturnyj institut instead of Arxitektura institutı ('Architure Institute')
- Sometimes it is used because many Russian phrases have a unique meaning such as Kuzkina mat (see Tsar Bomb).
- Often well known Tatar terms sound much longer than equivalent Russian terms: bezopasnyj → qurqınıçsızlı.
- The youngest generation use Russian slang words.
- Often one who can speak pure Tatar language uses a mix to communicate with the younger generation, as it is more understood by Russians and Tatars who do not speak the native language well.
- In areas such as science and technology, where the most of Tatar words are of Russian origin, it is usual to conjunct them with Russian phrases.
- In some cases, Tatar words are used in Russian speech to convey a meaning that the Russian word does not have or to provide "Tatar color" to the sentences. For example, well-known phrases by all Tatarstan communities: Alla birsä 'God willing', maturım 'my beauty', and canım 'my soul' (the last two for lovers).

== The origin of code-switching ==
Russian was an administrative language, as well as a language of higher education, ever since the fall of Kazan. The literary Tatar language did not have Indo-European roots and was most closely related to several Turkic languages, whose prestige decreased after the Russian revolution whereas knowledge of Russian increased and many Russian words entered into the literary language.

Tatar–Russian code-switching is based in from the asymmetric bilingualism of Tatars and the introduction of Russian schools, as well as total decline of the national culture as defined by educated Tatars after the 1930s. Another major factor is that the most commonly used language in the cities is Russian. Although there were many Russian-speakers present before the Revolution, more arrived as the result of population transfer in the Soviet Union. Tatars living outside of Tatarstan also code-switch, as there are no Tatar schools outside of Tatarstan.

== Written form ==
The code-switching for a long time had only an oral form, but the popularization of the Internet and SMS it became written. It is written using a Russian or English keyboard without the additional Tatar Cyrillic or Latin characters. The following example is taken from a Tatar hip hop and R&B forum:

| 1 | Original: | She's an angel))) билетлар хз, сорашмадым... |
| 1 | Transliteration (in Russian way): | English: She's an angel))) Tatar: biletlar Russian: khz, Tatar: sorashmadym... |
| 1 | Translation: | She's an angel:))) As for tickets, i don't know (хз = хрен знает, 'what on earth!') I haven't inquired |
| 2 | Original: | Да уж ангелское личико.. А задний мосты таралмаган мы сон? Ансы куренми бит..Жибар але бер икесен, в полный рост |
| 2 | Transliteration: | Russian: Da uj angelskoye lichiko... A zadniy most Tatar: y taralmagan my son? Ansy kurenmi bit.. jibar ale ber ikesen, Russian: v polnyy rost |
| 2 | Translation: | Indeed yes, she has angels' face... Her "rear axle"s wheel chamber are Okay, aren't they? It isn't seen, after all... Just send me other one, the full-length. |
| 3 | Original: | окай ман, личный ящиктан кара |
| 3 | Transliteration: | English: Okay man, Russian: lichnyy yashchik Tatar: tan qara |
| 3 | Translation: | Okay man, see it from (at) (my) personal box tan qara |

There is seen that there is a grammatical agreement of Russian phrases following the rule of Tatar grammar: zadniy most is Russian for 'rear axle', but Tatar possession suffix is used to is sense of 'her back axle' (zadniy mosty).

== See also ==
- Bashkir–Russian code-switching
