= Khadir =

Khadir may refer to:

- Khadir, Iran, in Fars Province, Iran
- Khadir District, Afghanistan
- Khadir and Bangar, an alluvial region of North India and Pakistan
- Khadir Bet, an island in the Great Rann of Kutch salt marsh, in Gujarat, India
- Abbas Khadir (born 1973; German: Abbas Khider), German writer of Iraqi origin
- Amir Khadir (born 1961), Canadian politician of Iranian origin
- Khadir (surname), a family name
- Khidr or al-Khidr, a figure described in the Quran

== See also ==
- Khadar (disambiguation)
