= Bashkir–Russian code-switching =

Mixing of languages among bilingual Bashkir people

Bashkir–Russian code-switching is a code-switching widespread among Bashkir people of Russia and ex-Soviet republics who are bilingual in Bashkir and Russian.

== Background ==
Russian language has the status of being the official language of Russian Federation and is also used as the international communication language; at the same time Bashkir language is the official language in the Republic of Bashkortostan. However, different circumstances require from people a high level of both Russian and Bashkir language proficiency. Therefore, due to historical events and circumstances, the Baskir–Russian code-switching has appeared.

Its character is asymmetric: such code-switching is typical for many Russian-speaking Bashkortostan residents, whose level of Bashkir language proficiency is limited due to lack of practical skills. The level of Bashkir proficiency is quite high for Bashkirs in villages (about 92%) and in cities (more than 74%); about 50% Bashkirs of the urban area and 24% of rural area have high levels of balanced Bashkir-Russian bilingualism; about 32% of Bashkirs of the urban area and 6.4% Bashkirs of the rural area have higher skills in Russian than in Bashkir.

Also there are multiple cases of multilingualism for Tatar, Russian, and Bashkir languages in Bashkortostan. In such cases the Bashkir language plays the role of another international communication language.

== Interference of Bashkir with Russian spoken by Bashkirs ==
Due to the differences between the two languaes on a phonological, grammatical and lexical level Bashkir speakers often falsely incorporate habits from Bashkir into their Russian.

Examples where Bashkir interferes with the spoken Russian include:

- Мин пошёл. Можно мы я книгу возьму? (I [in Bashkir] went. Can we I take a book?)
- Ты эту банку варенья из подпола достать. будешь (You will do have taken that jar with jam from the crawl space.)
- Я о весне сочинение написать буду. (I will do have written essay on spring.)

Phonological influences of Bashkir include:

- The insertion of an epenthetic vowel between consonants: проспект (boulevard) — проспекыт, акт (act) — акыт
- The adding of an epenthetic vowel at the beginning of words: штаны (pants) — ыштан
- Extrapolating Bashkir phonetics to Russian, resulting in the replacement of Russian-specific sounds with similar sounding ones from Bashkir
- Extrapolating Bashkir grammar to Russian: Мальчик учить собаку (A boy to teach a dog)

== Influence of Russian on Bashkir ==
Similarly, the more dominant Russian exerts its influence on the Bashkit language, leading to the incorporation of many Russian loan words into Bashkir. Bashkir speakers also extend Russian grammar rules onto Bashkir, leading to awkward or incorrect sentences.

The most common interference cases are in the similar-sounding words like:

- акыт (/ʼa.kɯ̆t/) — акт (akt; «act»)
- аптика (/apˈti.ka/) — аптека (apteka; «drugstore»)
- батун (/ba.tun/) — батон (baton; «biscuit, loaf»)
- битун (/bi.dun/) — бидон (bidon; «crate, tin»)
- галуш (/ga.luʃ/) — галоши (galoši; «galoshes»)
- малатук (/ma.la.tuk/) — молоток (molotok; «hammer»)
- тәрилкә (/ˈtæ.rilˌkæ/) — тарелка (tarelka; «plate»)
- самауыр (/sa.maˈwɯ̆r/) — самовар (samovar)

A lot of speakers also extrapolate Russian sentence structure to Bashkir sentences, most commonly using calque or word-by-word translation. The most common manifestation of this is the use of wrong word order — using SVO, while the Bashkir word order is SOV.

- Мин уҡыйым мәктәптә (proper Bashkir "Мин мәктәптә уҡыйым")
- Яңы йыл белән! (calque from Russian "С новым годом!"), proper Bashkir "... ҡотло булһын!"

The biggest problem with such interference is that the Bashkir language becomes extremely vulnerable to the corruption of its phonology, sentence structure and vocabulary by the Russian equivalents. Russian language is much less vulnerable to this interference due to its dominant position in all environments.

== See also ==
- Tatar–Russian code-switching

== Literature ==
- Ураксин З. Г. (1996). Билингвизм.// Башкортостан: краткая энциклопедия. Уфа: Башкирская энциклопедия. p. 180. ISBN 5-88185-001-7.
- Юлдашев Ю. Х. Национально-русское двуязычие в Республике Башкортостан в современных условиях. Уфа, 2007.
- О двуязычии в Башкирской ССР // Проблемы духовной культуры тюркских народов СССР. Уфа, 1991.
- Этноязыковая ситуация в Ленинском районе г. Уфы (социолингвистический аспект) Л Проблемы духовной культуры тюркских народов СССР. Уфа, 1991.
- О некоторых особенностях двуязычия // Наука Урала. Свердловск, 1991. No. 16.
- Проблемы двуязычия в городе // Вопросы этнографии городского населения Башкортостана. Уфа, 1992.
- Zakirianov K. Z., Zainullin M. V. BASHKIR-RUSSIAN BILINGUALISM AS A PHENOMENON OF MUTUAL ENRICHMENT OF CULTURES // Vestnik Bashkirskogo Universiteta. 2015. Vol. 20. No. 1. Pp. 166-171.
