= Kadyrov =

Kadyrov, feminine: Kadyrova is a patronymic surname derived from the given name Kadyr and may be associated with the Kadyrov family. Notable people with the surname include:

- Akhmad Kadyrov (1951–2004), former president of Chechnya
- Gulnabat Kadyrova, Turkmenistan weightlifter
- Khalid Kadyrov (born 1994), Russian footballer
- Ochil Kadyrov (1910–1945), World War II Hero of the Soviet Union
- Ramzan Kadyrov (born 1976), head of Chechnya, son of Akhmad
- Rashid Kadyrov (born 1952), Prosecutor General in the government of Uzbekistan in 2004
- Vladislav Kadyrov (born 1970), Azerbaijani/Russian footballer and coach
- Yasmina Kadyrova, Tatar / Russian pair skater
- Zaure Kadyrova, Kazakh political scientist
- Zhanna Kadyrova, Ukrainian artist working in sculpture, installation, and public art
