= Argayash =

Argayash Аргаяш
- Selo
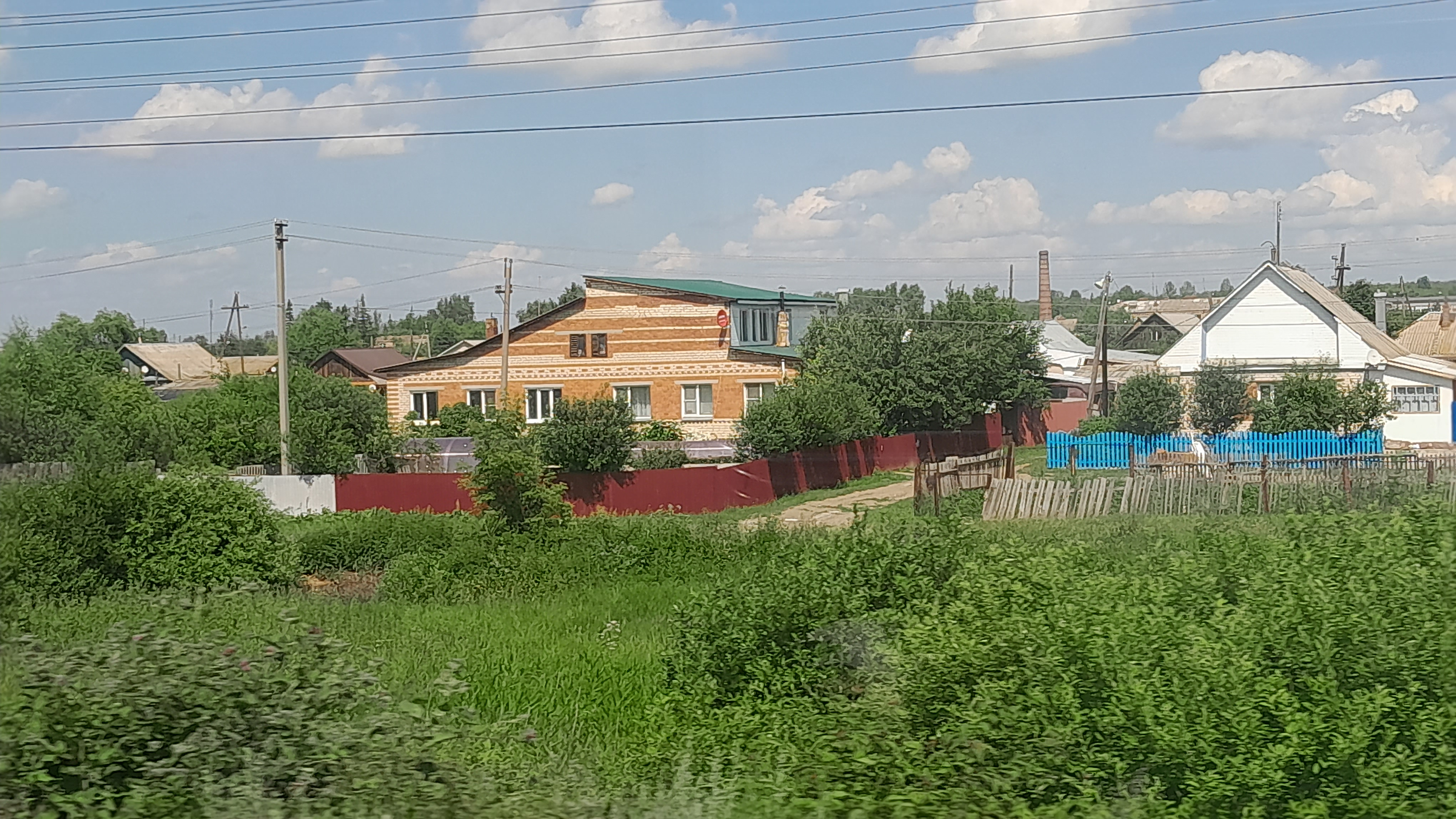

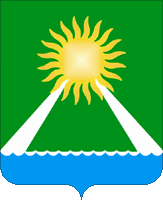
- Flag Coat of arms
- Interactive map of Argayash
- Location of Argayash Argayash (Chelyabinsk Oblast)
- Coordinates: 55°29′20″N 60°52′33″E
- Country: Russia
- Federal subject: Chelyabinsk Oblast
- Administrative district: Argayashsky District
- SettlementSelsoviet: Argayashskoye Settlement
- Founded: 1895
- Elevation: 256 m (840 ft)

Population (2010 Census)
  - Total: 10,061
  - Estimate (1 January 1934): 2,886 (−71.3%)

Administrative status
  - Capital of: Argayashsky District, Argayashskoye Settlement

Municipal status
  - Municipal district: Argayashsky Municipal District
  - Rural settlement: Argayashskoye Rural Settlement
  - Capital of: Argayashsky Municipal District, Argayashskoye Rural Settlement
- Time zone: UTC+5 (MSK+2)
- Postal code: 456880
- OKTMO ID: 75606412101

Argayash (Russian: Аргаяш) is a rural locality (a selo) and the administrative center of Argayashsky District of Chelyabinsk Oblast, Russia. Population: 10,061 (2010 census); 10,170 (2002 census); 10,526 (1989 Soviet census).

Between 1930 and 1934, Argayash served as the administrative center of Argayash National Okrug.
