= Kunashak =

Rural locality in Chelyabinsk Oblast, Russia

Coordinates: 55°42′03″N 61°33′03″E

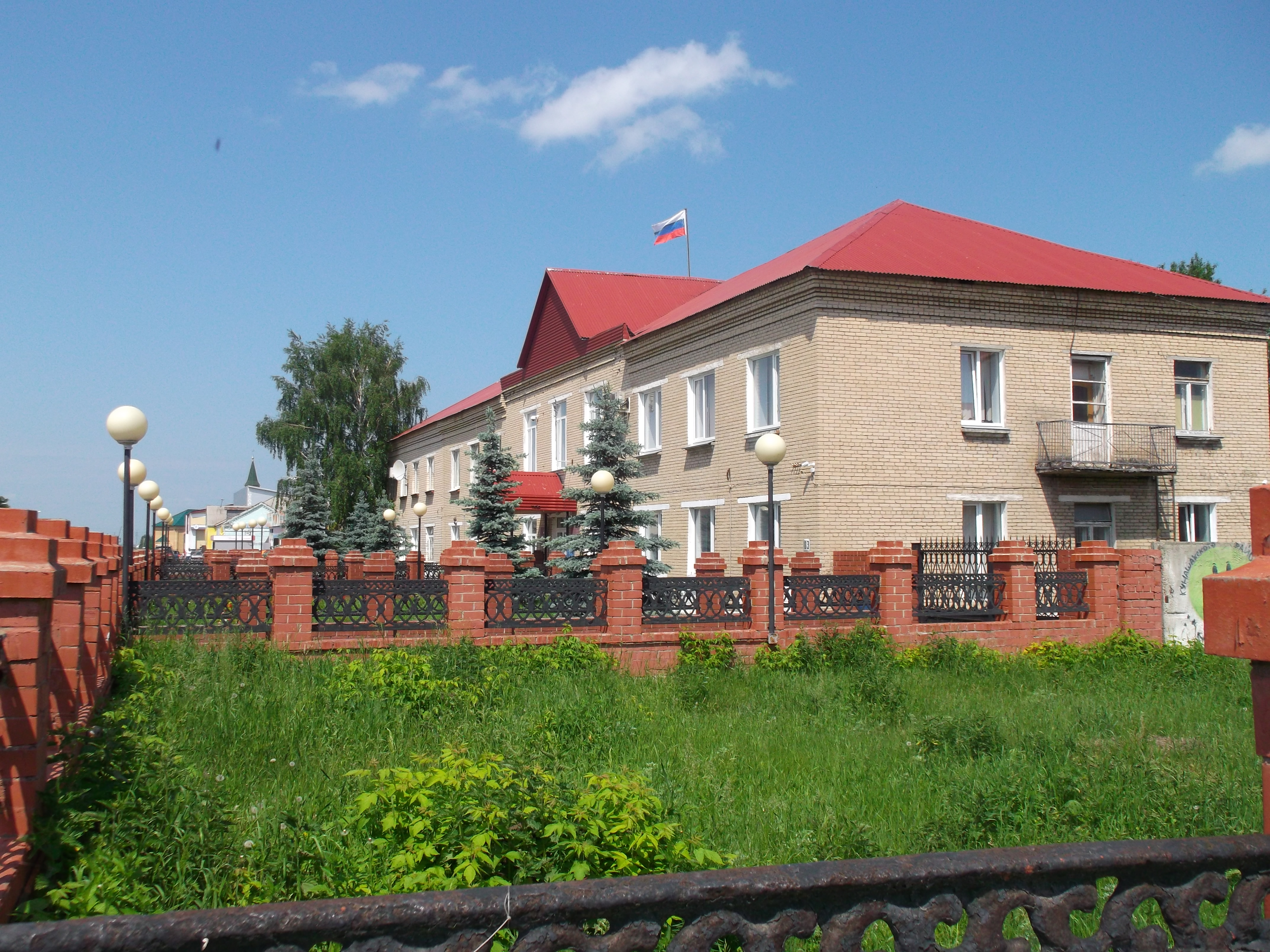
Building in Kunashak

Kunashak (Russian: Кунашак) is a rural locality (a selo) and the administrative center of Kunashaksky District, Chelyabinsk Oblast, Russia. Population: 6,296 (2010 census); 5,993 (2002 census); 5,703 (1989 Soviet census).
