= Miasskoye =

Rural locality in Chelyabinsk Oblast, Russia

Coordinates: 55°16′57″N 61°53′38″E

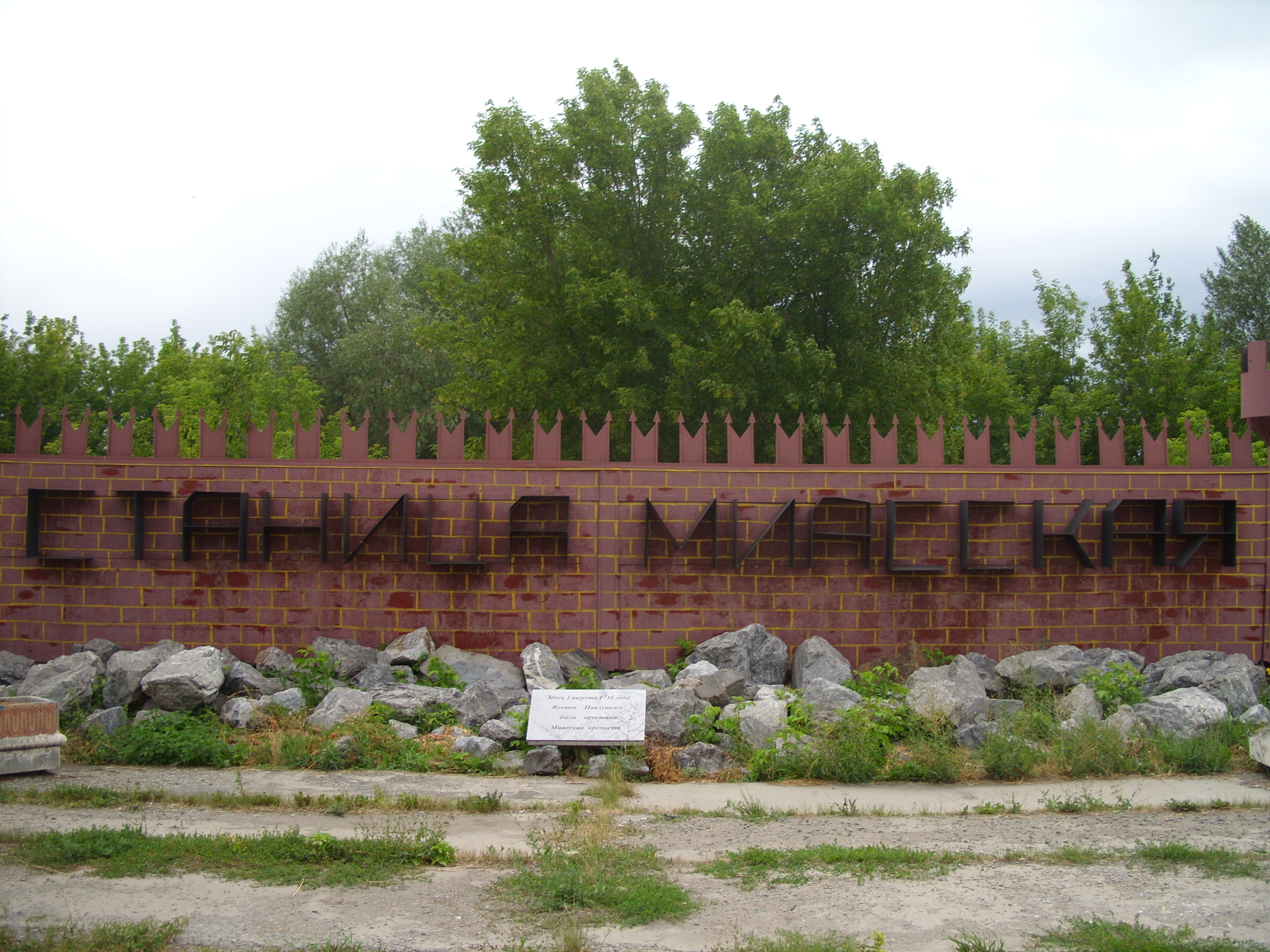
Miasskoye

Miasskoye (Russian: Миасское) is a rural locality (a selo) and the administrative center of Krasnoarmeysky District, Chelyabinsk Oblast, Russia. Population: 9,755 (2010 census); 9,593 (2002 census); 9,541 (1989 Soviet census).
