= Kunashaksky District =

Kunashaksky District Кунашакский район (Russian)
- District
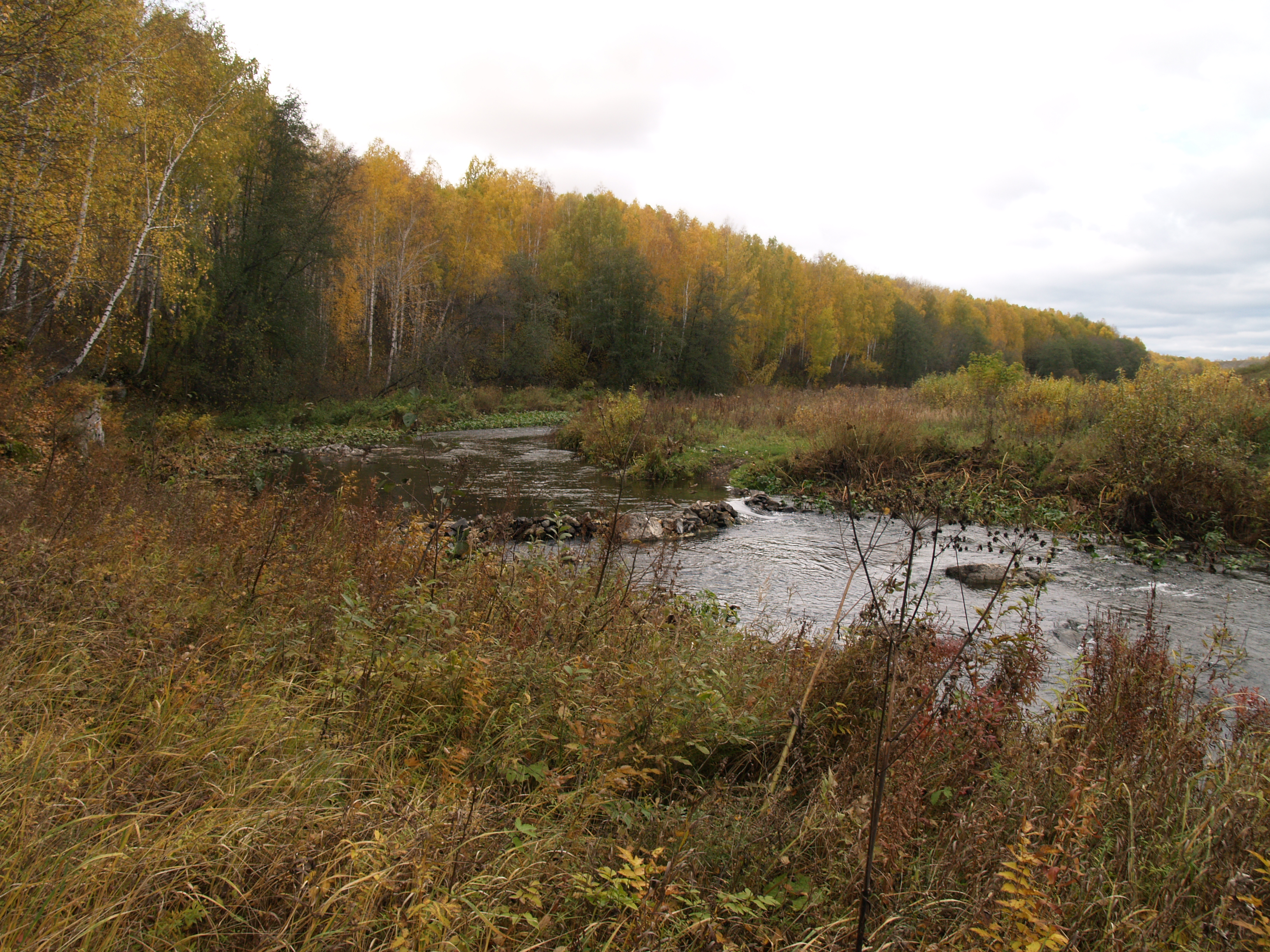
- Bagaryak River, Kunashaksky District

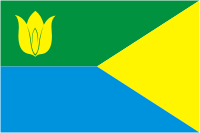
- Flag Coat of arms
- Location of Kunashaksky District in Chelyabinsk Oblast
- Coordinates: 55°42′N 61°33′E
- Country: Russia
- Federal subject: Chelyabinsk Oblast
- Established: 20 August 1930
- Administrative center: Kunashak

Area
  - Total: 3,280 km^{2} (1,270 sq mi)

Population (2010 Census)
  - Total: 30,112
  - Density: 9.18/km^{2} (23.8/sq mi)
  - Urban: 0%
  - Rural: 100%

Administrative structure
  - Administrative divisions: 9 selsoviet
  - Inhabited localities: 73 rural localities

Municipal structure
  - Municipally incorporated as: Kunashaksky Municipal District
  - Municipal divisions: 0 urban settlements, 9 rural settlements
- Time zone: UTC+5 (MSK+2)
- OKTMO ID: 75636000
- Website: http://www.kunashak.ru/

Kunashaksky District (Russian: Кунашакский райо́н) is an administrative and municipal district (raion), one of the twenty-seven in Chelyabinsk Oblast, Russia. It is located in the northeast of the oblast. The area of the district is 3,280 square kilometers (1,270 sq mi). Its administrative center is the rural locality (a selo) of Kunashak. Population: 30,112 (2010 census); 32,225 (2002 Census); 35,167 (1989 Soviet census). The population of Kunashak accounts for 20.9% of the district's total population.

The district was part of the Bashkir Autonomous Socialist Soviet Republic until January 1934, and together with neighboring Argayashsky District, formed the exclave Argayash Canton. The two districts were added to Chelyabinsk Oblast as the Argayash National Okrug, which itself only survived until November 1934.
