= Kamal Qadir =

Kurdish human rights activist (born 1958)

Dr. Kamal Sayid Qadir (also known as Kamal Berzenji; born 1958 in Arbil, Iraq) is a Kurdish human rights activist with Austrian citizenship. He immigrated to Austria in 1978 and studied law at the Vienna School of Law. He has taught at the University of Suleimani (1998–99) as well as Salahaddin University in Arbil (1999–2000) in Iraq. He had been arrested in October 2005. He was sentenced to 30 years' imprisonment for defamation. The sentence was condemned by Amnesty International, Reporters without Borders and media. Dr.Qadir went on hunger strike when in prison and stopped when he could get his demands.

He was released from custody on January 25, 2006, as a result of efforts by special envoy of the Austrian foreign ministry, Gudrun Harrer. The envoy intervened after the Austrian government deemed the sentence too harsh. Qadir was later retried and the sentence was changed to eighteen months. In April 2006 he was released.

== External links and sources ==
- Austrian Imprisoned in Iraq Released
- Amnesty International - "Iraq: Incommunicado detention/fear of torture or ill-treatment: Kamal Sayid Qadir (m), aged 48, Austrian national, writer". 30 November 2005.
- Kurdish Media - "Dr Kamal Said Qadir: Don’t let Kurds put their hands in my blood". 19 December 2005.
- The reality of Dr Kamal Qadir’s case in his sisters’ statements:We salute you Awaz and Galawej!
- Dr. Kamal Sayid Qadir released in Kurdistan today
- RSF welcomes release of Dr. Kamal Sayid Qadir - IFEX
