= Kadyr Yusupov =

Uzbekistani diplomat (1951–2024)

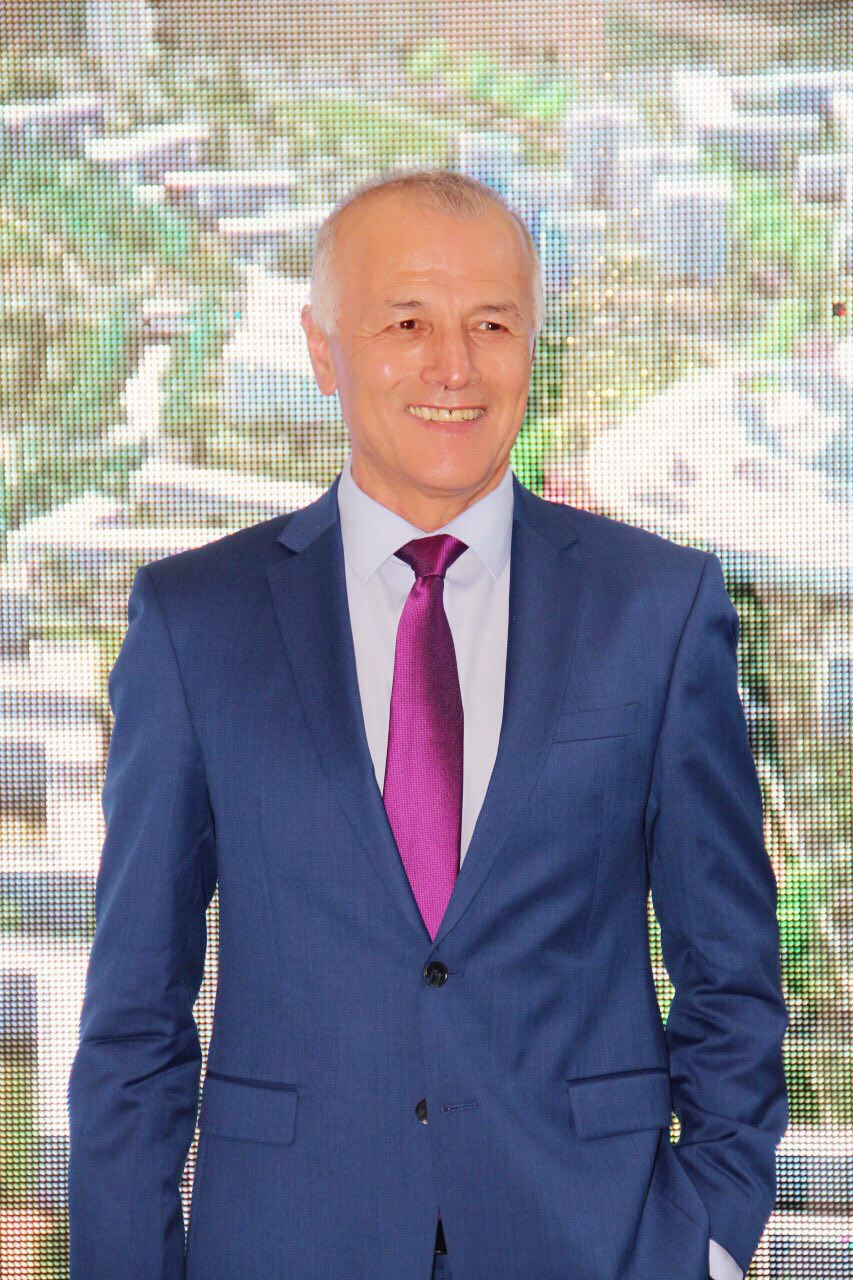
Kadyr Yusupov

Kadyr Yusupov (Uzbek: Қодиржон Юсупов, Russian: Кадыржан Юсупов; 18 December 1951 – 14 November 2024) was an Uzbekistani diplomat who was held in prison on charges of treason. The UN Working Group on Arbitrary Detention and several prominent international NGOs called for his immediate release and rehabilitation.

Yusupov was a career diplomat from Uzbekistan, who served as his country's Chargé d'affaires in Austria, Slovakia and Hungary from 2006 until 2009. He simultaneously held the post of the Permanent Representative of Uzbekistan to the Organization for Security and Co-operation in Europe, UN and other international organizations in Vienna.

== Early life ==
Kadyr Yusupov was born in Olmazar, a village outside Tashkent, Uzbek SSR to a working-class family. In 1970 he began his studies at the Tashkent State Institute of Oriental Studies, graduating in 1976 with a degree in Arabic studies. From 1976 to 1982, he worked as interpreter at diplomatic missions in Libya and Iraq.

== Diplomatic career ==
In 1982 Yusupov joined the diplomatic service of the then regional Ministry of Foreign Affairs in Tashkent. From 1987 until 1991 he worked as First Secretary at the embassy in Khartoum, Sudan. With the collapse of the Soviet Union in 1991 Yusupov returned to the now independent Uzbekistan. Later that year he won a place at the Diplomatic Academy of the Ministry of Foreign Affairs of the Russian Federation in Moscow and graduated in 1993.

In 1994 he was posted to Austria as Uzbekistan's Counsellor. From 1995 to 1999, he was appointed the Head of Asia Department at the Uzbek Ministry of Foreign Affairs in Tashkent. During his tenure he was part of an international team of experts negotiating for peaceful settlement in Afghanistan as part of the Six plus Two Group on Afghanistan, operating under the aegis of the UN. From 1999 to 2002, Yusupov worked as Counsellor and Deputy Head of Mission at the Embassy of Uzbekistan in London. From 2006 to 2009 he was Chargé d'affaires in Vienna. He left the Ministry of Foreign Affairs in 2009, and has since been working in the private sector advising foreign businesses on investments in Uzbekistan.

== Arrest ==
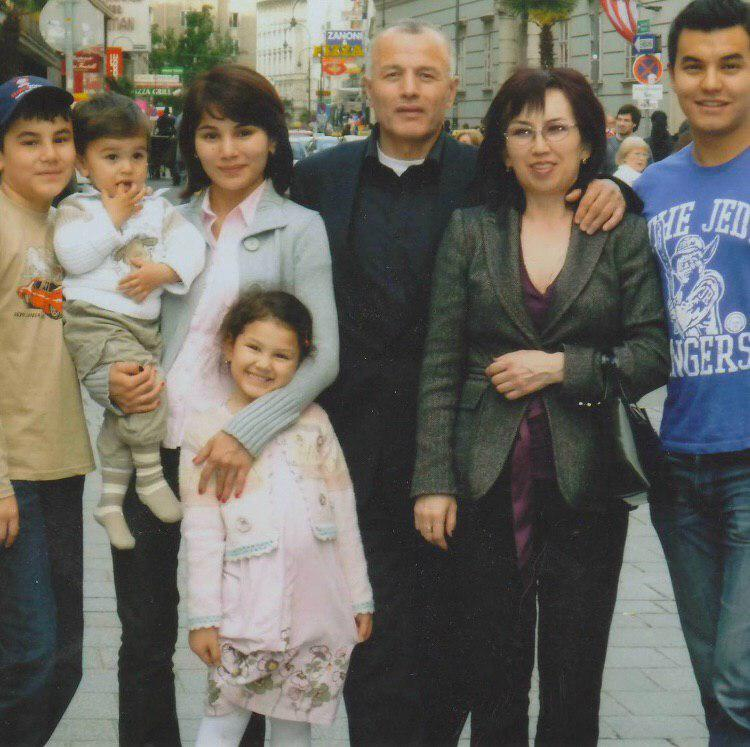
The Yusupov family

Yusupov suffered from long-term mental health issues, with symptoms of schizophrenia. On 3 December 2018, following a psychotic episode Yusupov attempted suicide by jumping under a metro train at the Pushkin station in Tashkent.

He survived with a broken collarbone and a brain injury. On 10 December, the State Security Service of Uzbekistan detained Yusupov on charges of treason under article 157 of the Uzbek Criminal Code. He denied the charges. A closed trial in Tashkent started on 24 June 2019.

== Allegations of mistreatment ==
Yusupov's lawyer Allan Pashkovskiy alleges that the State Security Service of Uzbekistan engaged in violations of procedures and used psychological torture against Yusupov between December 2018 and April 2019, including denial of medication and threats of sexual violence against his family. Complaints were filed to the Ombudsman for Human Rights in Uzbekistan, National Human Rights Centre, Presidential Administration, the Prosecutor General and the State Security Service.

On 14 June 2019, the Prosecutor General Office denied all allegations of torture against Yusupov. Deputy Prosecutor General Erkin Yuldashev said in the press conference that following an internal investigation, the office established 'no facts of psychological and physical torture in relation to Yusupov... and that we are responsible for the outcome of this decision'.

== International response ==
=== Human Rights groups ===
On 11 June 2019, Human Rights Watch (HRW) issued a press release urging the Uzbek authorities to release Kadyr Yusupov. The press release stated:

According to [Yusupov's relatives], Yusupov said that between December 2018 and late March 2019, two State Security Services officers entered his (Yusupov's) cell two or three times each day and threatened that if he did not admit his guilt, they would rape him with a rubber baton, rape his wife and daughter, and arrest his two sons, including a son who lives abroad, by means of extradition...No amount of [Uzbekistan's] progress on paper can be successful when the rule of law is blatantly disregarded, and people are in practice subject to torture.

On 21 June 2019, International Partnership for Human Rights (IPHR) and Association for Human Rights in Central Asia included Yusupov's case in the ongoing EU-Uzbekistan Human Rights Dialogue in Brussels.

=== United Nations ===
Yusupov's case was recently reviewed by the Special procedures of the United Nations Human Rights Council.

On 25 May 2021, The United Nations Working Group on Arbitrary Detention adopted a legal opinion No. 3/2021 concerning Kadyr Yusupov (Uzbekistan). Having reviewed legal arguments from both sides, the Working Group determined that Kadyr Yusupov has been arbitrarily detained by the government of Uzbekistan since December 2018, in contravention of articles 3, 8, 9, 10, 11 of the Universal Declaration of Human Rights and articles 2(3), 9, 14 of the International Covenant on Civil and Political Rights. The Working Group requested the government of Uzbekistan to immediately release, provide remedies and compensation to Kadyr Yusupov, and report back to the United Nations Human Rights Council within 6 months. It further requested the government to take appropriate measures against those responsible for the violation of Kadyr Yusupov's rights.

The government of Uzbekistan had not complied with the UN Working Group's decision.

Geoffrey Robertson, QC, a human rights barrister and founder of Doughty Street Chambers, represented Kadyr Yusupov at the UN. He said:

This is a most damning criticism of a country (Uzbekistan) that is pretending to the West that it respects the rule of law but is in reality allowing its secret police and its lickspittle judges to behave brutally. The conduct of its security police was disgusting as they tried to force a confession from a man recovering from a mental breakdown and then for 5 months denied him all contact with his family and his lawyer of choice. The judges behaved like legal lickspittles, refusing to investigate the torture to which he had been subjected.

=== Media ===
On 12 June 2019, Alec Luhn, foreign affairs correspondent for the British newspaper The Daily Telegraph published an article about Yusupov's arrest.

BBC Uzbek Service and Radio Liberty published online articles in Uzbek and Russian. Uzbek news portal Kun.uz ran a series of investigative articles.

On 25 June, the German newspaper Süddeutsche Zeitung published a feature by Silke Begalke, titled 'Usbekistan: Netter Versuch' (English: 'Uzbekistan: Nice try') alleging human rights violations by the new government of Uzbekistan.

On 11 July, Peter Leonard of Eurasianet published a piece about Yusupov's detention, entitled: 'Former diplomat crushed by Uzbekistan's broken justice system'.

On 4 August, Agnieszka Pikulicka-Wilczewska of the Al Jazeera printed an article on another case of treason charge in Uzbekistan, that of Andrey Kubatin - an academic imprisoned in Uzbekistan in 2017. Yusupov's case was mentioned alongside.

On 30 August, Kadyr Yusupov's eldest son, Babur appeared on Sky News with Adam Boulton for an interview on his father's arrest and trial.

Yusupov's case has also been mentioned in relation to the closure of the Jaslyk Prison by The Diplomat and The Economist.

From 2020 until 2021, several prominent newspapers have covered the developments in the case of Kadyr Yusupov. Those include: Financial Times, The Times, The Telegraph, The Diplomat, The Economist and others.

=== Institutional investors in Uzbekistan ===
On 13 July 2021, Laurence Fletcher of the Financial Times published an in-depth article on Western financial institutions and funds investing into sovereign bonds of countries with poor human rights records. Belarus, Saudi Arabia and Uzbekistan were singled out and Kadyr Yusupov's imprisonment and torture were described in detail. The article raised the issue of human rights within the ESG sphere, and greenwashing by western corporations professing to uphold principles of responsible investment. On 7 August, a follow up article appeared in the paper's 'On Wall Street' column.

=== Governments ===
British MP Greg Hands has said of Yusupov's detention: 'British Government are continuing to monitor this case closely'. Hands went on to publicly state his long-term interest in the human rights situation in Uzbekistan, and his active involvement in Yusupov's case.

The Baroness Stern CBE, a member of the House of Lords and advocate for reforms of criminal justice, also commented on the case. Baroness Stern visited Uzbekistan in 2016 on an official visit.

== Trial and imprisonment ==
Kadyr Yusupov's closed trial in Tashkent started on 24 June 2019. According to his family and lawyer, following publication of articles in Western media, he was once again denied access to Escitalopram antidepressant medication by the prison authorities.

On 8 January 2020, Kadyr Yusupov was sentenced to five and a half years in prison. He was held in Prison Colony No.4 in Navoi, a prison infamous for its brutal treatment of inmates.

== Death ==
Yusupov died on November 14, 2024, at the age of 72.
