= Bashkir language =

Kipchak Turkic language

Bashkir
- башҡорт теле (башҡортса) başqort tele (başqortsa) باشقۇرت تلىُ (باشقۇرتسا) باشقرد تلی (باشقردچە)
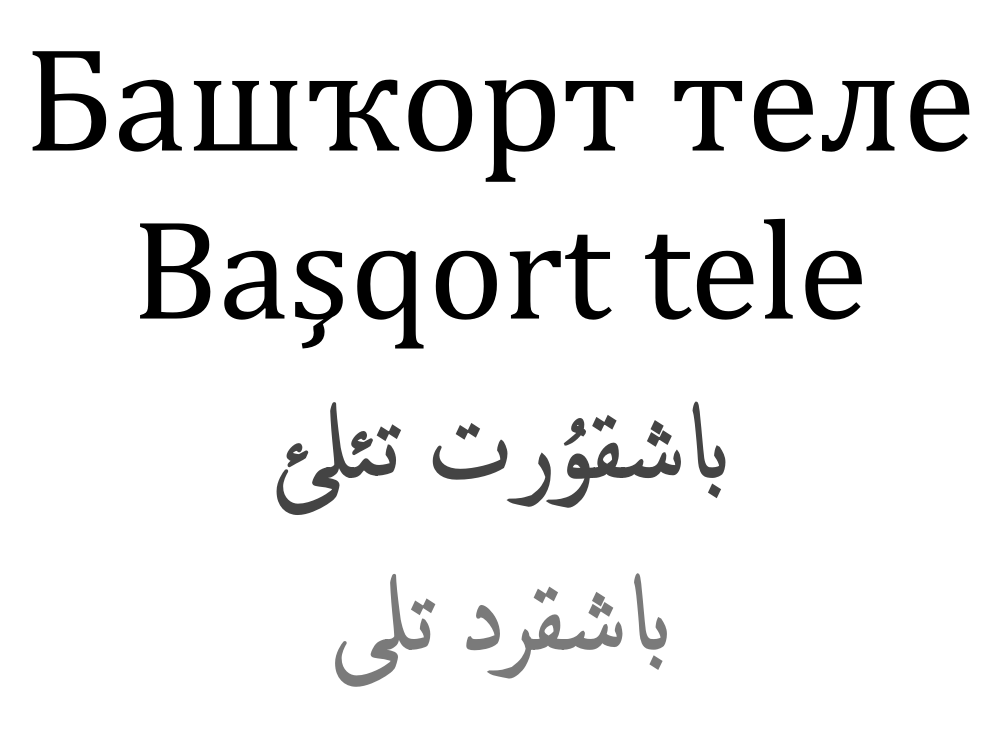
- Bashkir in Cyrillic, Latin, and Perso-Arabic scripts
- Pronunciation: [bɑʂˈqʊ̞rt tɪ̞ˈlɪ̞]
- Native to: Bashkortostan, Russia
- Region: Volga-Ural region
- Ethnicity: 1.57 million Bashkirs in Russian Federation (2021 Russian census)
- Native speakers: 1.08 million (2020)
- Language family: Turkic: Common Turkic; Kipchak; Kipchak–Bulgar; Bashkir
- Early form: Ural-Volga Turki
- Dialects: Southern; Eastern; Northwestern
- Writing system: Cyrillic, Latin, Arabic (Bashkir alphabet)

Official status
- Official language in: Bashkortostan (Russia)
- Regulated by: Institute of history, language and literature of the Ufa Federal research center the RAS

Language codes
- ISO 639-1: ba
- ISO 639-2: bak
- ISO 639-3: bak
- Glottolog: bash1264
- Linguasphere: 44-AAB-bg
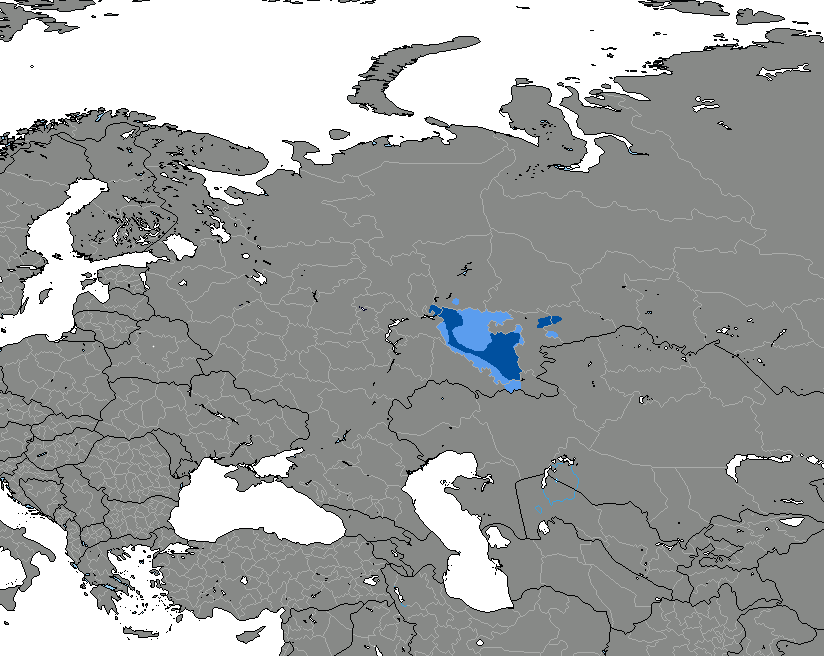

- Bashkir is classified as Vulnerable by the UNESCO Atlas of the World's Languages in Danger.

Bashkir (UK: /bæʃˈkɪər/ bash-KEER, US: /bɑːʃˈkɪər/ bahsh-KEER) or Bashkort (Bashkir: башҡорт теле, romanized: başqort tele, [bɑʂˈqʊ̞rt tɪ̞ˈlɪ̞]) is a Turkic language belonging to the Kipchak branch. It is co-official with Russian in Bashkortostan. It is spoken by approximately 1.6 million native speakers in Russia, as well as in Ukraine, Belarus, Kazakhstan, Uzbekistan, Estonia, and other neighboring post-Soviet states, and among the Bashkir diaspora. It has three dialect groups: Southern, Eastern, and Northwestern.

== Speakers ==
Speakers of Bashkir mostly live in the republic of Bashkortostan (a republic within the Russian Federation). Many speakers also live in Tatarstan, Chelyabinsk, Orenburg, Tyumen, Sverdlovsk and Kurgan Oblasts, and other regions of Russia. Minor Bashkir groups also live in Kazakhstan and the United States.

== Classification ==
Bashkir and Tatar belong to the Kipchak-Bulgar (Russian: кыпчакско-булгарская) subgroup of the Kipchak languages. These languages have a similar vocabulary by 94.9%, and have not only a common origin but also a common ancestor in written language—Volga Turki. But Bashkir differs from Tatar in several important ways:

- Bashkir has dental fricatives /θ/ and /ð/ in the place of Turkic /t/, /d/, /s/ and /z/. For example, Turkish dost and Bashkir дуҫ (duś), Turkish adım and Bashkir аҙым (aźım), Turkish usta and Bashkir оҫта (ośta), or Turkish uzun and Bashkir оҙон (oźon). Bashkir /θ/ and /ð/ cannot begin a word (with exceptions: ҙур (źur) [ðuɾ] 'big', and the particle/conjunction ҙа (źa) [ða] or ҙә (źä) [ðæ]). The only other Turkic language with a similar feature is Turkmen. But in Bashkir, /θ/ and /ð/ are two independent phonemes, distinct from /s/ and /z/, whereas in Turkmen [θ] and [ð] are the two main realizations of the common Turkic /s/ and /z/. In other words, there are no /s/ and /z/ phonemes in Turkmen, unlike Bashkir, which has both /s/ and /z/ and /θ/ and /ð/.
- The word-initial and morpheme-initial /s/ turns into /h/. An example of both features is Tatar сүз (süz) and Bashkir һүҙ (hüź), both meaning "word".
- Common Turkic /tʃ/ (Tatar /ɕ/) turns into Bashkir /s/, e.g., Turkish ağaç [aˈatʃ], Tatar агач (ağaç) [ɑˈʁɑɕ], and Bashkir ағас (ağas) [ɑˈʁɑs], all meaning "tree".
- The word-initial /ʑ/ in Tatar always corresponds to /j/ in Standard Bashkir, e.g., Tatar җылы (cılı) [ʑɤˈlɤ] and Bashkir йылы (yılı) [jɯˈɫɯ], both meaning "warm". Although the eastern and northern dialects of Bashkir occasionally do shift /j/ to /ʑ~ʒ/.

Bashkir orthography is more explicit. /q/ and /ʁ/ are written with their own letters, Ҡ ҡ and Ғ ғ, whereas in Tatar they are treated as positional allophones of /k/ and /ɡ/, written К к and Г г.

Labial vowel harmony in Bashkir is written explicitly, e.g., Tatar тормышым (tormışım) and Bashkir тормошом (tormoşom, both pronounced [tʊɾ.mʊˈʂʊm], meaning "my life".

== Sample text ==
| Cyrillic script | Latin script (1930–1940) | Latin script | Arabic script (Yañı imlä) | Arabic script (Iśke imlä) | IPA transcription |
|---|---|---|---|---|---|
| Барлыҡ кешеләр ирекле, дәрәжәләре һәм хоҡуҡтары тигеҙ булып тыуалар. Улар аҡыл һәм выждан эйәһе һәм бер-береһенә ҡарата ҡәрҙәшлек рухында хәрәкәт итергә тейештәр. | Barlьq keşelər irekle, dərəƶələre həm xoquqtarь tigeđ bulьp tьualar. Ular aqьl həm vьƶdan ejəhe həm ber-berehenə qarata qərđəşlek ruxьnda xərəkət itergə tejeştər. | Barlıq keşelər irekle, dərəjələre həm xoquqtarı tigeđ bulıp tıwalar. Ular aqıl həm vıjdan eyəhe həm ber-berehenə qarata qərđəşlek ruxında xərəkət itergə teyeştər. | بارلق كشىُلەر ئیركلىُ، دەرەژەلەرىُ ھەم حۇقوقتارىُ تیگذ ࢭبولب تىُوالار. ئولار ئاقل ھەم وژدان ئییەھىُ ھەم بر-بىُرىُھىُنە قاراتا قەرذەشلك روحندا حەرەكەت ئیترگە تییشتەر. | بارلق كشیلر ایركلی، درجه‌لری هم حقوقتری تیگذ بولوب طوه‌لر. اولر عقل هم وجدان ایه‌هی هم بربریهینه قاراته قارذشلك روحینده حركت ایتورگه تیوشتر. | bɑrˈɫɯ̞q kɪ̞ʃɪ̞ˈlær irɪ̞kˈlɪ̞ dæræʒælæˈrɪ̞ hæm χʊ̞quqtɑˈrɯ̞ tʲiˈɡɪ̞ð buˈɫɯ̞p tɯ̞wɑˈɫɑr ‖ uˈɫɑr ɑˈqɯ̞ɫ hæm vɯ̞ʒˈdɑn ɪ̞jæˈhɪ̞ hæm ˌbɪ̞r‿bɪ̞rɪ̞hɪ̞ˈnæ qɑrɑˈtɑ qærðæʃˈlɪ̞k ruχɯ̞nˈdɑ χæræˈkæt itɪ̞rˈgæ tɪ̞jɪ̞ʃˈtær ‖ |

== Orthography ==
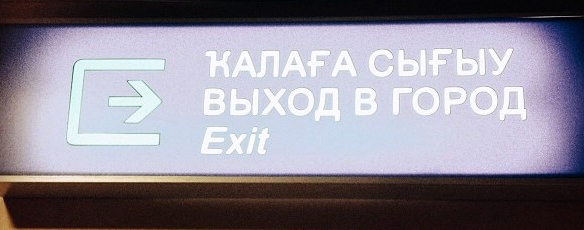
Trilingual sign in Ufa Airport in Bashkir, Russian and English

Bashkir keyboard layout

After the adoption of Islam, which began in the 10th century and lasted for several centuries, the Bashkirs began to use Turki as a written language. Turki was written in a variant of the Arabic script.

In 1923, a writing system based on the Arabic script was specifically created for the Bashkir language. At the same time, the Bashkir literary language was created, moving away from the older written Turkic influences. At first, it used a modified Arabic alphabet. In 1930 it was replaced with the Unified Turkic Latin Alphabet, which was in turn replaced with an adapted Cyrillic alphabet in 1939.

The modern alphabet used by Bashkir is based on the Russian alphabet, with the addition of the following letters: Ә ә /æ/, Ө ө /ø/, Ү ү /ʏ/, Ғ ғ /ʁ/, Ҡ ҡ /q/, Ң ң /ŋ/, Ҙ ҙ /ð/, Ҫ ҫ /θ/, Һ һ /h/.

| А а | Б б | В в | Г г | Ғ ғ | Д д | Ҙ ҙ | Е е | Ё ё |
| Ж ж | З з | И и | Й й | К к | Ҡ ҡ | Л л | М м | Н н |
| Ң ң | О о | Ө ө | П п | Р р | С с | Ҫ ҫ | Т т | У у |
| Ү ү | Ф ф | Х х | Һ һ | Ц ц | Ч ч | Ш ш | Щ щ | Ъ ъ |
| Ы ы | Ь ь | Э э | Ә ә | Ю ю | Я я |

Letters of the Bashkir Cyrillic alphabet
| Cyrillic version | Pronunciation | Notes |
|---|---|---|
| Аа | [ɑ], [a] | "A" is usually pronounced as [ɑ] in all syllables except last, in last syllable it is pronounced as [a]. |
| Бб | [b], [β] | [β] is the intervocal allophone. |
| Вв | [v], [w] | [v] in Russian loanwords, [w] in Arabic and Persian loanwords. |
| Гг | [ɡ] | |
| Ғғ | [ʁ] | |
| Дд | [d] | |
| Ҙҙ | [ð] | |
| Ее | [jɪ], [ɪ] | The letter is iotated at the beginning of a word, after a vowel or after a soft or hard sign. |
| Ёё | [jɔ] | Only used in Russian loanwords. |
| Жж | [ʐ] | Only occurs in loanwords and onomatopoeia. |
| Зз | [z] | |
| Ии | [i], [ij] | Occurs only in the first syllable. In most other contexts, especially in open syllables, it is an underlying /ij/, for example in words like ти [tij]/[tɪj]. Hence why the suffixes use the /ð/ consonant following this vowel, unlike /l/ after other vowels: тиҙәр (tiźär) /tijˈðær/, but not тиләр (tilär). |
| Йй | [j] | |
| Кк | [k] | |
| Ҡҡ | [q] | |
| Лл | [l], [ɫ] | In front vowel contexts occurs as apical [l], in back vowel contexts occurs as [ɫ]. |
| Мм | [m] | |
| Нн | [n] | |
| Ңң | [ŋ], [ɴ] | In front vowel contexts occurs as [ŋ], in back vowel contexts occurs as [ɴ]. |
| Оо | [ʊ] | |
| Өө | [ø], [y] | Shifts to [y] in vicinity of [j]: өйҙә (öyźä) [yjˈðä] |
| Пп | [p] | |
| Рр | /r/, [ɾ] | [ɾ] is the intervocal allophone. |
| Сс | [s] | |
| Ҫҫ | [θ] | |
| Тт | [t] | |
| Уу | [u], [w] | These two letters are used for /w/ phoneme when they are written after a back or front vowel respectively. As the vowel phoneme, they can only occur in the first syllable. Therefore if these letters are not in the first syllable, they occur after a vowel and are pronounced as /w/. |
| Үү | [ʏ], [w] | These two letters are used for /w/ phoneme when they are written after a back or front vowel respectively. As the vowel phoneme, they can only occur in the first syllable. Therefore if these letters are not in the first syllable, they occur after a vowel and are pronounced as /w/. |
| Фф | [ɸ] | |
| Хх | [χ] | |
| Һһ | [h] | |
| Цц | [ts] | |
| Чч | [tɕ] | |
| Шш | [ʂ] | |
| Щщ | [ɕː] | Only occurs in loanwords. |
| Ъъ | [ʔ] | Only occurs in back vowel contexts (except loanwords). Indicates a glottal stop if placed after a vowel, acts as a syllable separator if placed after a consonant. |
| Ыы | [ɯ] | |
| Ьь | [ʔ] | Only occurs in front vowel contexts (except loanwords). Indicates a glottal stop if placed after a vowel, acts as a syllable separator if placed after a consonant. |
| Ээ | [ɪ] | |
| Әә | [æ] | |
| Юю | [ju] | |
| Яя | [jɑ], [ja] | |

Bashkir Latin alphabet based on the Common Turkic alphabet

| A a | Ä ä | B b | C c | Ç ç | D d | E e | F f | G g |
| Ğ ğ | H h | X x | I ı | İ i | J j | K k | Q q | L l |
| M m | N n | Ñ ñ | O o | Ö ö | P p | R r | S s | Ś ś |
| Ş ş | T t | U u | Ü ü | V v | W w | Y y | Z z | Ź ź |

Letter Comparison
| Latin | Cyrillic |
|---|---|
| A a | А а |
| Ä ä | Ә ә |
| B b | Б б |
| C c | - |
| Ç ç | Ч ч / Щ щ |
| D d | Д д |
| Ź ź | Ҙ ҙ |
| E e | Э э |
| F f | Ф ф |
| G g | Г г |
| Ğ ğ | Ғ ғ |
| H h | Һ һ |
| X x | Х х |
| I ı | Ы ы |
| İ i | И и |
| J j | Ж ж |
| K k | К к |
| Q q | Ҡ ҡ |
| L l | Л л |
| M m | М м |
| N n | Н н |
| Ñ ñ | Ң ң |
| O o | О о |
| Ö ö | Ө ө |
| P p | П п |
| R r | Р р |
| S s | С с |
| Ş ş | Ш ш |
| T t | Т т |
| Ś ś | Ҫ ҫ |
| U u | У у |
| Ü ü | Ү ү |
| V v | В в |
| W w | У у / Ү ү (consonant variants) |
| Y y | Й й |
| Z z | З з |

== Phonology ==
An example of the sound of the Bashkir literary language is a poem by Shaykhzada Babich "Халҡым өсөн"

=== Vowels ===
Bashkir has nine native vowels, and three or four loaned vowels (mainly in Russian loanwords).

Phonetically, the native vowels are approximately thus (with the Cyrillic letter followed by the usual Latin romanization in angle brackets):

| | Front | | Back | |
| | Unrounded | Rounded | Unrounded | Rounded |
|---|---|---|---|---|
| Close | и ⟨i⟩ [i] | ү ⟨ü⟩ [y~ʉ] | | у ⟨u⟩ [u] |
| Mid | э, е ⟨e⟩ [ɪ̆~ɘ̆] | ө ⟨ö⟩ [ø̆~ɵ̆] | ы ⟨ı⟩ [ɯ̆~ɤ̆] | о ⟨o⟩ [ʊ̆] |
| Open | ә ⟨ä⟩ [æ] | | а ⟨a⟩ [ɑ] | |

In Russian loans there are also [ɨ], [e], [ɔ] and [ä], written the same as the native vowels: ы, е/э, о, а respectively.

- The vowel /y/ may also be realized as [ʏ].
- The vowel /ɯ̽/ might sometimes be realized as [ɤ̆].
- The vowel /ɪ/ might sometimes be realized either as [ɛ̆], or as [ĭ].
- The vowels /i/ and /ʊ/ might sometimes be realized as [e] and [o], especially in southern dialects.

==== Historical shifts ====
Historically, the Proto-Turkic mid vowels have raised from mid to high, whereas the Proto-Turkic high vowels have become the Bashkir reduced mid series. (The same shifts have also happened in Tatar.) However, in most dialects of Bashkir, this shift is not as prominent as in Tatar.

| Vowel | Common Turkic | Tatar | Bashkir | Gloss |
|---|---|---|---|---|
| *e /ɛ/ | *et | it | it /it/ | 'meat' |
| *ö /œ/ | *söz | süz | hüź /hʏð/ | 'word' |
| *o /ɔ/ | *sol | sul | hul /huɫ/ | 'left' |
| *i /i/ | *it | et | et /ɪt/ | 'dog' |
| *ï /ɤ/ | *qïz | qız | qıź /qɯð/ | 'girl' |
| *u /u/ | *qum | qom | qom /qʊm/ | 'sand' |
| *ü /y/ | *kül | köl | köl /køl/ | 'ash' |

=== Consonants ===
Consonants
| | | Bilabial | Labio- dental | Dental | Alveolar | Post- alveolar/ Palatal | Velar | Uvular | Glottal |
|---|---|---|---|---|---|---|---|---|---|
| Nasals | | м ⟨m⟩ /m/ | | н ⟨n⟩ /n/ | | | ң ⟨ñ⟩ /ŋ/ | ң ⟨ñ⟩ [ɴ]^{²} | |
| Plosives | Voiceless | п ⟨p⟩ /p/ | | т ⟨t⟩ /t/ | | т ⟨t⟩ [c]^{²} | к ⟨k⟩ /k/ | ҡ ⟨q⟩ /q/ | ь/ъ /ʔ/^{¹} |
| Plosives | Voiced | б ⟨b⟩ /b/ | | д ⟨d⟩ /d/ | | д ⟨d⟩ [ɟ]^{²} | г ⟨g⟩ /ɡ/ | | |
| Fricatives | Voiceless | | ф ⟨f⟩ /f/^{¹} | ҫ ⟨ś⟩ /θ/ | с ⟨s⟩ /s/ | ш ⟨ş⟩ /ʃ/ | | х ⟨x⟩ /χ/ | һ ⟨h⟩ /h/ |
| Fricatives | Voiced | б ⟨b⟩ [β]^{²} | в ⟨v⟩ /v/^{¹} | ҙ ⟨ź⟩ /ð/ | з ⟨z⟩ /z/ | ж ⟨j⟩ /ʒ/ | | ғ ⟨ğ⟩ /ʁ/ | |
| Trill | | | | | р ⟨r⟩ /r/ | | | | |
| Approximants | | | | | л ⟨l⟩ /l/ | й ⟨y⟩ /j/ | у/ү/в ⟨w⟩ /w~ɥ/ | | |

Notes
^¹ The phonemes /f/, /v/, /ʔ/ are found only in loanwords, and, in the case of /ʔ/, in a few native onomatopoeic words.
^² [β] is an intervocal allophone of [b], and it is distinct from [w]. [ɴ] is an allophone of [ŋ] in back vowel contexts. [c] and [ɟ] occur as allophones of [k] and [g] before [e], and both occur only in front vowel contexts.

- /θ, ð/ are dental [θ, ð], and /ɾ/ is apical alveolar [ɾ]. The exact place of articulation of the other dental/alveolar consonants is unclear.

== Grammar ==
A member of the Turkic language family, Bashkir is an agglutinative, SOV language. A large part of the Bashkir vocabulary has Turkic roots; and there are many loan words in Bashkir from Russian, Arabic and Persian sources.

| Russian | | | Arabic | | | Persian | | |
| in Bashkir | Etymology | Translation | in Bashkir | Etymology | Translation | in Bashkir | Etymology | Translation |
|---|---|---|---|---|---|---|---|---|
| минут (minut) | from "минута" (minuta) | minute | ваҡыт (waqıt) | from "وَقْت" (waqt) | time | дуҫ (duś) | from "دوست" (dost) | friend |
| өҫтәл (öśtäl) | from "стол" (stol) | table, desk | вәғәҙә (wäğäźä) | from "وَعْدَ" (waʿda) | promise | һәр (här) | from "هر" (har) | every |
| сыр (sır) | from "сыр" (syr) | cheese | йәннәт (yännät) | from "جَنَّة" (janna) | paradise | көмбәҙ (kömbäź) | from "گنبد" (gonbad) | cupola |

=== Plurality ===
The form of the plural suffix is heavily dependent on the letter which comes immediately before it. When it's a consonant, there is a four-way distinction between "л" (l), "т" (t), "ҙ" (ź) and "д" (d); The vowel's distinction is two-way between "а" (after back vowels "а" (a), "ы" (ı), "о" (o), "у" (u)) and "ә" (after front vowels "ә" (ə), "е" (e), "и" (i), "ө" (ö), "ү" (ü)). Some nouns are also less likely to be used with their plural forms such as "һыу" (hıw, "water") or "ҡом" (qom, "sand").

suffix consonant
| -лар, -ләр | after all vowels except for и (iy) | баҡса (baqsa), "garden" Pl.: баҡсалар (baqsalar) | сәскә (säskä), "flower" Pl.: сәскәләр (säskälär) |
| -тар, -тәр | mostly after hard consonants – б (b), д (d), г (g), ф (f), х (x), һ (h), к (k), ҡ (q), п (p), с (s), ш (ş), ҫ (ś), т (t) | дуҫ (duś), "friend" Pl.: дуҫтар (duśtar) | төҫ (töś), "colour" Pl.: төҫтәр (töśtär) |
| -ҙар, -ҙәр | after approximants and some others – ҙ (ź), и (iy), р (r), у/ү (w), й (y) | тау (taw), "mountain" Pl.: тауҙар (tawźar) | өй (öy), "house" Pl.: өйҙәр (öyźär) |
| -дар, -дәр | after nasals and some others – ж (j), л (l), м (m), н (n), ң (ñ), з (z) | һан (han), "number" Pl.: һандар (handar) | көн (kön), "day" Pl.: көндәр (köndär) |

=== Declension table ===
| | suffix | consonant alteration (see the "plurality" table) | after the plural suffix | examples |
|---|---|---|---|---|
| Nominative | | | | |
| Genitive | -нең | "н" (n), "д" (d), "т" (t) and "ҙ" (ź) | -ҙең | телдең (teldeñ), "the language's" |
| Genitive | -ның | "н" (n), "д" (d), "т" (t) and "ҙ" (ź) | -ҙың | баштың (baştıñ), "the head's" |
| Genitive | -ноң | "н" (n), "д" (d), "т" (t) and "ҙ" (ź) | -ҙың | тоҙҙоң (toźźoñ), "the salt's" |
| Genitive | -нөң | "н" (n), "д" (d), "т" (t) and "ҙ" (ź) | -ҙең | төштөң (töştöñ), "the dream's" |
| Dative | -гә | | -гә | телгә (telgä), "(to) the language" |
| Dative | -кә | | -гә | төшкә (töşkä), "(to) the dream" |
| Dative | -ға | | -ға | тоҙға (toźğa), "(to) the salt" |
| Dative | -ҡа | | -ға | башҡа (başqa), "(to) the head" |
| Accusative | -не | "н" (n), "д" (d), "т" (t) and "ҙ" (ź) | -ҙе | телде (telde), "the language" |
| Accusative | -ны | "н" (n), "д" (d), "т" (t) and "ҙ" (ź) | -ҙы | башты (baştı), "the head" |
| Accusative | -но | "н" (n), "д" (d), "т" (t) and "ҙ" (ź) | -ҙы | тоҙҙо (toźźo), "the salt" |
| Accusative | -нө | "н" (n), "д" (d), "т" (t) and "ҙ" (ź) | -ҙе | төштө (töştö), "the dream" |
| Locative | -лә | "л" (l), "д" (d), "т" (t) and "ҙ" (ź) | -ҙә | телдә (teldä), "in the language" |
| Locative | -ла | "л" (l), "д" (d), "т" (t) and "ҙ" (ź) | -ҙа | башта (başta), "in the head" |
| Ablative | -нән | "н" (n), "д" (d), "т" (t) and "ҙ" (ź) | -ҙән | телдән (teldän), "from the language" |
| Ablative | -нан | "н" (n), "д" (d), "т" (t) and "ҙ" (ź) | -ҙан | баштан (baştan), "from the head" |

Declension of pronouns
| | Interrogative pronouns | | Personal pronouns | | | | | |
| Case | who | what | Singular | | | Plural | | |
| Case | who | what | I | you (thou) | he, she, it | we | you | they |
|---|---|---|---|---|---|---|---|---|
| Nominative | кем kem | нимә nimä | мин min | һин hin | ул ul | беҙ beź | һеҙ heź | улар ular |
| Genitive | кемдең kemdeñ | нимәнең nimäneñ | минең mineñ | һинең hineñ | уның unıñ | беҙҙең beźźeñ | һеҙҙең heźźeñ | уларҙың ularźıñ |
| Dative | кемгә kemgä | нимәгә nimägä | миңә miñä | һиңә hiñä | уға uğa | беҙгә beźgä | һеҙгә heźgä | уларға ularğa |
| Accusative | кемде kemde | нимәне nimäne | мине mine | һине hine | уны unı | беҙҙе beźźe | һеҙҙе heźźe | уларҙы ularźı |
| Locative | кемдә kemdä | нимәлә nimälä | миндә mindä | һиндә hindä | унда unda | беҙҙә beźźä | һеҙҙә heźźä | уларҙа ularźa |
| Ablative | кемдән kemdän | нимәнән nimänän | минән minän | һинән hinän | унан unan | беҙҙән beźźän | һеҙҙән heźźän | уларҙан ularźan |

Demonstrative pronouns
| Case | Singular | | | | Plural | | | |
| Case | this | | that | | these | | those | |
|---|---|---|---|---|---|---|---|---|
| Nominative | был bıl | ошо oşo | шул şul | теге tege | былар bılar | ошолар oşolar | шулар şular | тегеләр tegelär |
| Genitive | бының bınıñ | ошоноң oşonoñ | шуның şunıñ | тегенең tegeneñ | быларҙың bılarźıñ | ошоларҙың oşolarźıñ | шуларҙың şularźıñ | тегеләрҙең tegelärźeñ |
| Dative | быға bığa | ошоға oşoğa | шуға şuğa | тегегә tegegä | быларға bılarğa | ошоларға oşolarğa | шуларға şularğa | тегеләргә tegelärgä |
| Accusative | быны bını | ошоно oşono | шуны şunı | тегене tegene | быларҙы bılarźı | ошоларҙы oşolarźı | шуларҙы şularźı | тегеләрҙе tegelärźe |
| Locative | бында bında | ошонда oşonda | шунда şunda | тегендә tegendä | быларҙа bılarźa | ошоларҙа oşolarźa | шуларҙа şularźa | тегеләрҙә tegelärźä |
| Ablative | бынан bınan | ошонан oşonan | шунан şunan | тегенән tegenän | быларҙан bılarźan | ошоларҙан oşolarźan | шуларҙан şularźan | тегеләрҙән tegelärźän |

== See also ==
- Bashkir alphabet
- Bashkir–Russian code-switching
