= Zunun Kadir =

Uyghur poet, playwright and novelist (1911–1989)

- زۇنۇن قادىرى
- Born: 1911; Emin, Xinjiang
- Died: September 24, 1989; Almaty
- Occupation(s): Poet, playwright, novelist

Zunun Kadir (Uyghur: زۇنۇن قادىرى) was a modern Uyghur poet, playwright, and novelist who was born in Emin, Xinjiang in 1911. Kadir began his career in 1936 and published his three-act drama Wen-chʻing-mu in 1942. He died in Almaty on September 24, 1989.
