= Argayashsky District =

Argayashsky District Аргаяшский район (Russian)
- District
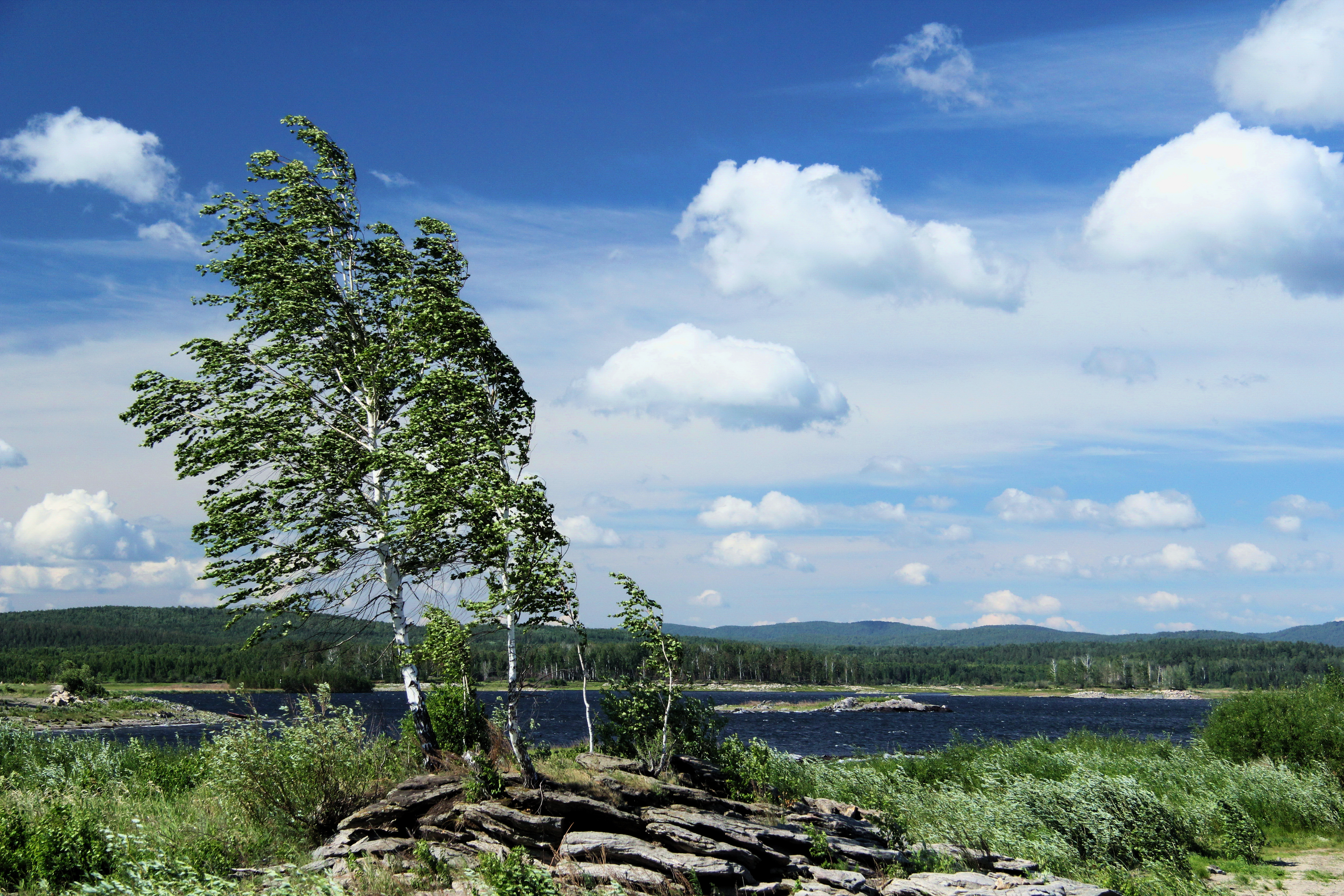
- Argazi Reservoir, Argayashsky District

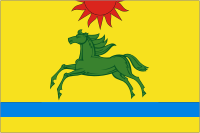
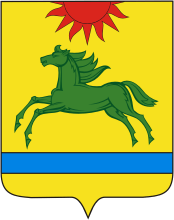
- Flag Coat of arms
- Location of Argayashsky District on the map of Chelyabinsk Oblast
- Coordinates: 55°29′19″N 60°52′38″E
- Country: Russia
- Federal subject: Chelyabinsk Oblast
- Established: 20 August 1930
- Administrative center: Argayash

Area
  - Total: 2,791 km^{2} (1,078 sq mi)

Population (2010 Census)
  - Total: 41,387
  - Density: 14.83/km^{2} (38.41/sq mi)
  - Urban: 0%
  - Rural: 100%

Administrative structure
  - Administrative divisions: 12 selsoviet
  - Inhabited localities: 85 rural localities

Municipal structure
  - Municipally incorporated as: Argayashky Municipal District
  - Municipal divisions: 0 urban settlements, 12 rural settlements
- Time zone: UTC+5 (MSK+2)
- OKTMO ID: 75606000
- Website: http://www.argayash.ru/

Argayashsky District (Russian: Аргая́шский райо́н) is an administrative and municipal district (raion), one of the twenty-seven in Chelyabinsk Oblast, Russia. It is located in the north of the oblast. The area of the district is 2,791 square kilometers (1,078 sq mi). Its administrative center is the rural locality (a selo) of Argayash. Population: 41,387 (2010 census); 42,808 (2002 Census); 43,733 (1989 Soviet census). The population of Argayash accounts for 24.3% of the district's total population.

The district was part of the Bashkir Autonomous Socialist Soviet Republic until 1934, and together with neighboring Kunashaksky District, formed the exclave Argayash Canton. The two districts were added to Chelyabinsk Oblast as the Argayash National Okrug, which itself only survived until November 1934.

== Notable people ==
- Kadir Rakhimovich Timergazin, Soviet geologist
- Elbrus Nigmatullin, powerlifter, internet celebrity
