= Ochil Kadyrov =

Soviet Uzbek machine gunner (1910–1945)

- Очил Кадыров
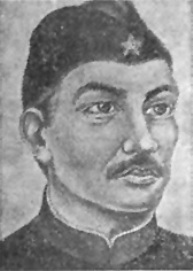
- Born: 1910; Samarkand Oblast, Russian Empire
- Died: 13 March 1945 (aged 34–35)
- Military career
- Allegiance: Soviet Union
- Branch: Red Army
- Service years: 1941–1945
- Rank: Red Army man
- Unit: 399th Rifle Division
- Conflicts: World War II; Operation Bagration; Bobruysk Offensive; Lublin-Brest Offensive
- Awards: Hero of the Soviet Union

Ochil Kadyrov (Russian: Очил Кадыров; 1910 – 13 March 1945) was an Uzbek Red Army soldier and a posthumous Hero of the Soviet Union. Kadyrov was posthumously awarded the title for reportedly using his machine gun to enable the crossing of the Narew by his regiment in September 1944. He was seriously wounded and died of his wounds on 13 March 1945.

== Early life ==
Kadyrov was born in 1910 in a village in Samarkand Oblast, now in the Koshrabot District, to a peasant family. He graduated from primary school and worked on the Kolkhoz.

== World War II ==
In 1941, Kadyrov was drafted into the Red Army and sent to the front. He fought on the Southern Front. Kadyrov was sent to the 1348th Rifle Regiment of the 399th Rifle Division and became a machine-gunner. He fought in Operation Bagration and the Bobruysk Offensive. On 29 June, during the battle for Bobruysk, Kadyrov reportedly was one of the first to cross the Berezina River and attacked a German trench alongside other soldiers. He reportedly killed 5 German soldiers, for which he was recommended for the Order of Glory 3rd class on 13 July. Instead, Kadyrov was awarded the Order of the Red Star on 23 July. On 19 July, during the battle for Koltuvka village in the Vawkavysk District, he was reportedly one of the first to advance into the village. During the fighting he reportedly killed 19 German soldiers with his machine gun. For this action he received the Order of the Red Star on 27 July.

From late July, Kadyrov fought in the Lublin–Brest Offensive. On 26 August, during fighting for the village of Stoke in Ostrów County in the Białystok Voivodeship, he reportedly supported the attack with machine gun fire. He reportedly killed 15 German soldiers and suppressed the fire of a machine gun, for which he was recommended for the Order of Glory 3rd class but was instead awarded the Medal "For Courage" on 11 September. On 3 September, he reportedly supported an infantry attack with his machine gun during a tank assault. During the battle for Gora, he reportedly repulsed a counterattack by positioning himself in a stone barn, killing German troops around self-propelled guns with his machine gun. On 4 September, during the crossing of the Narew south of Różan, the regiment was unable to break through German defenses. Kadyrov took his machine gun and ammunition across the river and reportedly opened fire on the German positions from the flank. He was reportedly wounded but did not leave his gun until the regiment had crossed the river. For this action, Kadyrov was recommended for an award of the title Hero of the Soviet Union.

As a result of his serious wounds, Kadyrov died on 13 March 1945. He was buried in the village of Sebistan in the Koshrabot District. On 24 March 1945, he was posthumously awarded the title Hero of the Soviet Union and the Order of Lenin.
