= Kadir Talabani =

Norwegian-Kurdish actor (born 1986)

Kadir started acting in 2009. He finished his bachelor's degree as a part of Det Multinorske program in 2014. He started working at Det Norske Teatret in 2014, and was in three stage productions that year: Elva som deler byen (The river which splits the town) directed by Harry Guttormsen, Hvem er redd (Who is afraid) directed by Lasse Kolsrud, and Andre Verdenskrig (World War II) directed by Erik Ulfsby. He was also cast in the feature film Bare Tjue, directed by Marius Sørvik.
