= Krasnoarmeysky District, Chelyabinsk Oblast =

Russian district

Krasnoarmeysky District Красноармейский район (Russian)
- District
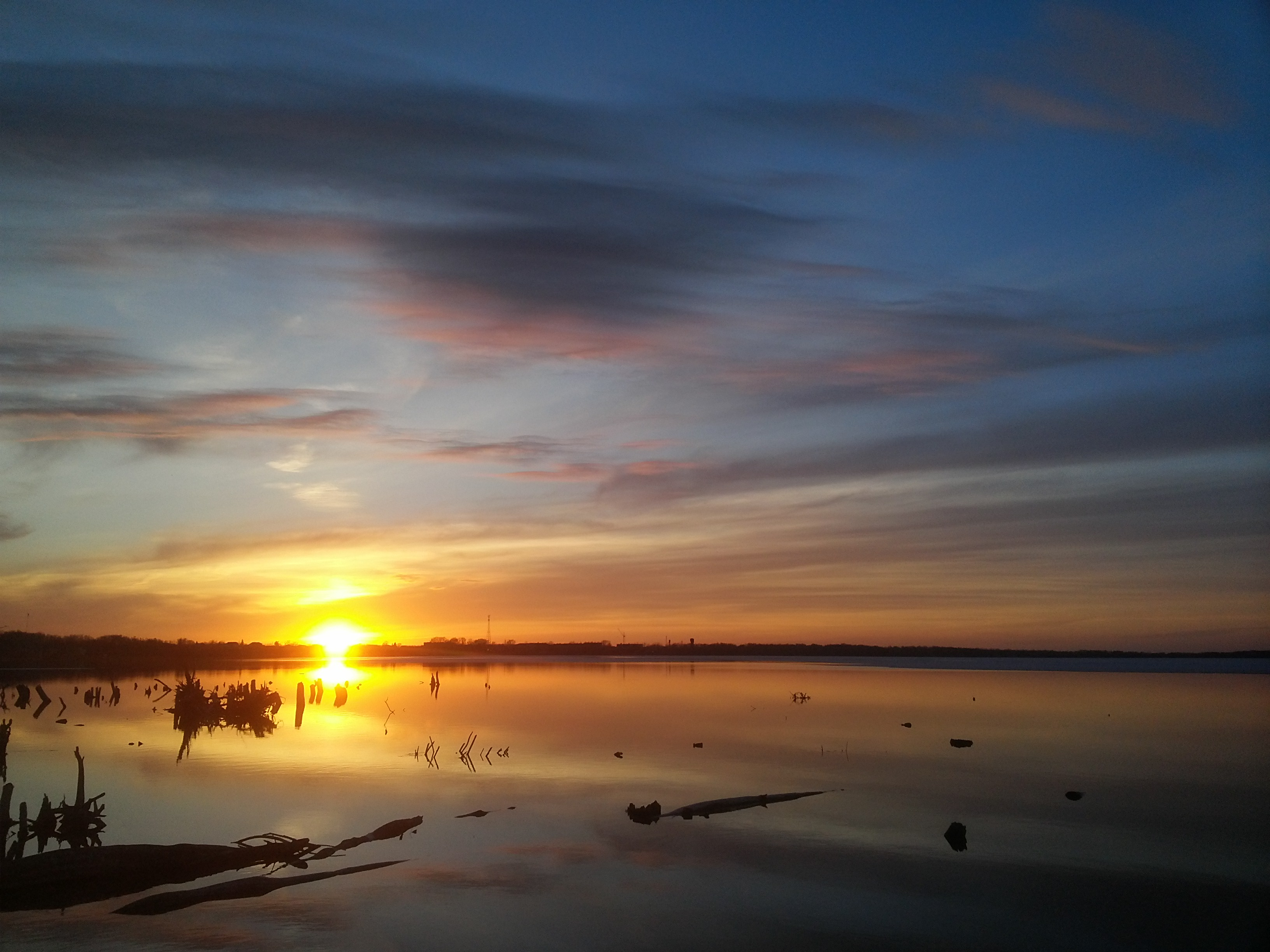
- Lake Sugoyak, Krasnoarmeysky District

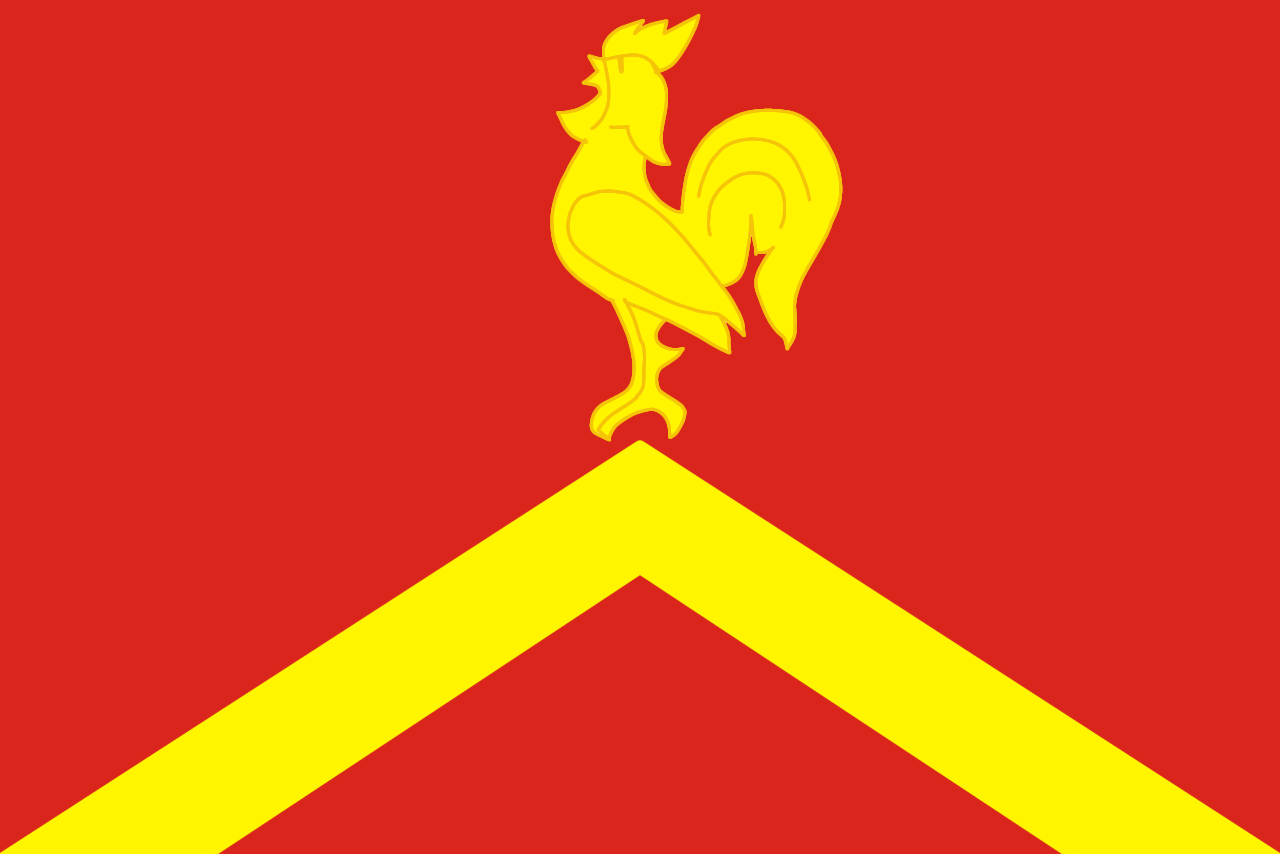
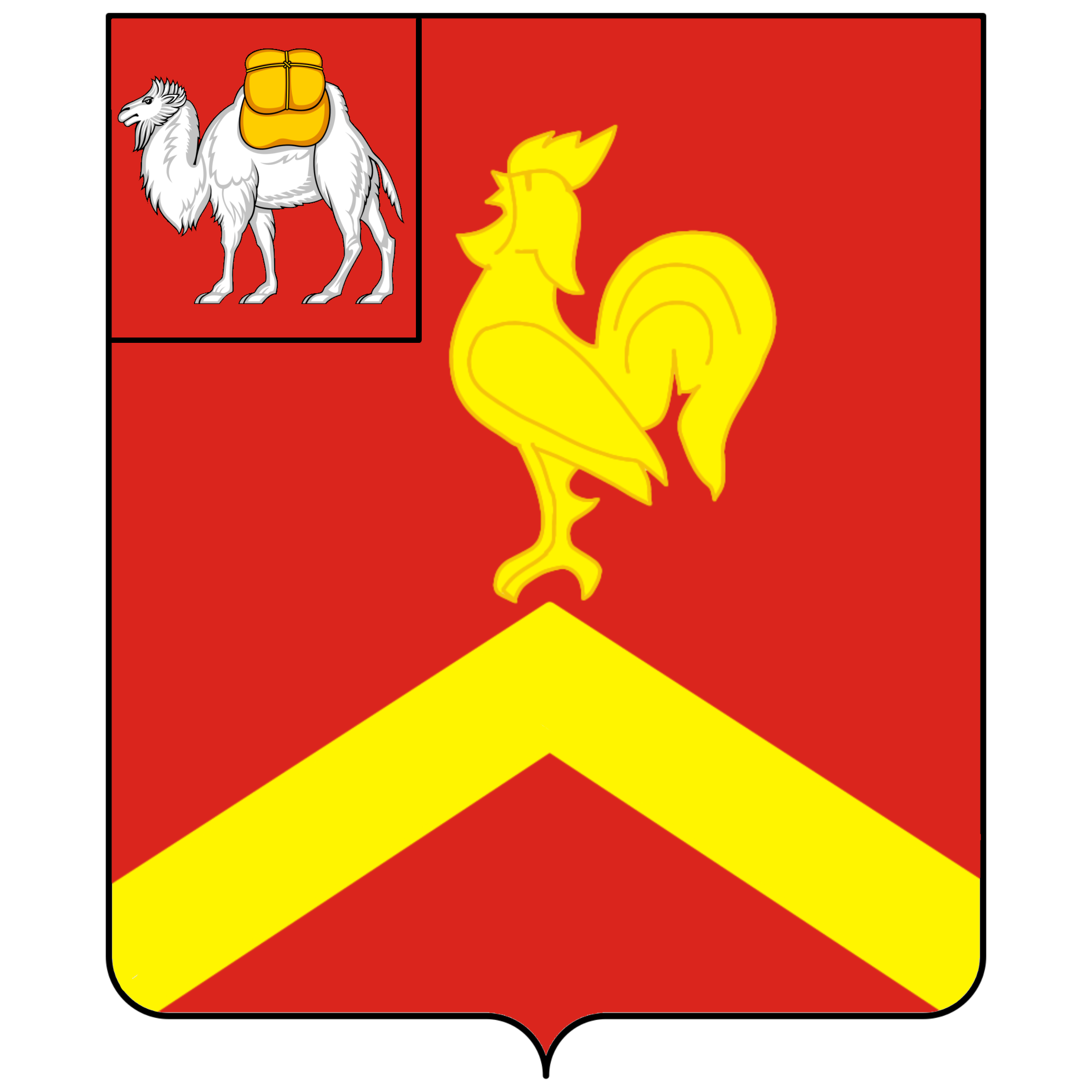
- Flag Coat of arms
- Location of Krasnoarmeysky District in Chelyabinsk Oblast
- Coordinates: 55°16′45″N 61°53′39″E
- Country: Russia
- Federal subject: Chelyabinsk Oblast
- Established: 13 January 1941
- Administrative center: Miasskoye

Area
  - Total: 3,835 km^{2} (1,481 sq mi)

Population (2010 Census)
  - Total: 41,710
  - Density: 10.88/km^{2} (28.17/sq mi)
  - Urban: 0%
  - Rural: 100%

Administrative structure
  - Administrative divisions: 15 selsoviet
  - Inhabited localities: 78 rural localities

Municipal structure
  - Municipally incorporated as: Krasnoarmeysky Municipal District
  - Municipal divisions: 0 urban settlements, 15 rural settlements
- Time zone: UTC+5 (MSK+2)
- OKTMO ID: 75634000
- Website: http://www.krasnoarmeyka.ru/

Krasnoarmeysky District (Russian: Красноарме́йский райо́н) is an administrative and municipal district (raion), one of the twenty-seven in Chelyabinsk Oblast, Russia. It is located in the northeast of the oblast. The area of the district is 3,835 square kilometers (1,481 sq mi). Its administrative center is the rural locality (a selo) of Miasskoye. Population: 41,710 (2010 census); 43,553 (2002 Census); 45,881 (1989 Soviet census). The population of Miasskoye accounts for 23.4% of the district's total population.
