= Extra-shortness =

Extra-short duration of a speech sound (usually a vowel)

Extra-short

◌̆

◌̮
- IPA number: 505

Encoding
- Entity (decimal): &#774;&#814;
- Unicode (hex): U+0306 U+032E
Image

The International Phonetic Alphabet (IPA) uses a breve ⟨ ˘ ⟩ to indicate a speech sound (usually a vowel) with extra-short duration. That is, [ă] is a very short vowel with the quality of [a]. An example from English is the short schwa of the word police [pə̆ˈliˑs]. This is typical of vowel reduction.

Before the 1989 Kiel Convention, the breve was used for a non-syllabic vowel (that is, part of a diphthong), which is now indicated by an inverted breve placed under the vowel letter, as in eye [aɪ̯]. It is also sometimes used for any flap consonants missing dedicated symbols in the IPA, since a flap is in effect a very brief stop.
