= Khader, Fars =

Khader خادر
- Village
- Location within Iran
- Coordinates: 28°26′07″N 53°45′51″E
- Country: Iran
- Province: Fars
- County: Jahrom
- Bakhsh: Central
- Rural District: Kuhak

Population (2006)
  - Total: 98
- Time zone: UTC+3:30 (IRST)
  - Summer (DST): UTC+4:30 (IRDT)

Khader (Persian: خادر, also Romanized as Khāder; also known as Khādīr) is a village in Kuhak Rural District, in the Central District of Jahrom County, Fars province, Iran. As per 2006 census, its population was 98, in 23 families.
