= Armorial of Oryol Oblast =

List of the coats of arms of used in Oryol Oblast, Russian Federation.

As of 1 January 2013, there were 267 municipalities in Oryol Oblast - 3 urban districts, 24 municipal districts, 17 city and 223 rural settlements.

== Coat of arms of Oryol Oblast ==
| Coats of arms | Oblast | Approval date | Number in SHRRF |
| | Oryol Oblast (2012 to present) | 3 July 2012 | 1056 |
| | Oryol Oblast (2002 to 2012) | | |

== Coats of arms of cities ==
| Coats of arms | City | Approval date | Number in SHRRF |
| | Bolkhov | 16 August 1781 | |
| | Dmitrovsk | 10 July 2004 | 1514 |
| | Livny | 16 August 1781; 26 May 2005 | 1907 |
| | Maloarkhangelsk | 16 August 1781 | |
| | Mtsensk | 23 May 2011 | 7237 |
| | Novosil | 8 March 1778 | |
| | Oryol | 16 August 1781; 29 January 1998 | |

== Coats of arms of municipal districts ==
| Coats of arms | District | Approval date | Number in SHRRF |
| | Bolkhovsky District | 9 July 2010 | 6350 |
| | Dmitrovsky District | 13 November 2010 | 6520 |
| | Dolzhansky District | 19 August 2015 | 6376 |
| | Glazunovsky District | 29 June 2010 | 6352 |
| | Khotynetsky District | 23 November 2010 | 6544 |
| | Kolpnyansky District | 21 July 2008 | 4270 |
| | Korsakovsky District | 25 May 2010 | 6232 |
| | Krasnozorensky District | 16 April 2010 | 6354 |
| | Kromskoy District | 12 October 2009 | 5765 |
| | Livensky District | 26 June 2006 | 2554 |
| | Maloarkhangelsky District | 30 October 2011 | 7116 |
| | Mtsensky District | 25 September 2008 | 4430 |
| | Novoderevenkovsky District | 18 May 2010 | 6356 |
| | Novosilsky District | 25 June 2010 | 6358 |
| | Orlovsky District | 23 December 2009 | 5870 |
| | Pokrovsky District | 26 February 2010 | 6039 |
| | Shablykinsky District | 18 December 2009 | 6025 |
| | Soskovsky District | 26 November 2010 | 6542 |
| | Sverdlovsky District | 15 January 2010 | 6026 |
| | Trosnyansky District | 25 November 2010 | 6518 |
| | Uritsky District | 19 November 2009 | 5872 |
| | Uritsky District | 19 November 2009 | 5872 |
| | Verkhovsky District | 23 March 2010 | 6234 |
| | Zalegoshchensky District | - | |
| | Znamensky District | 24 December 2010 | 6688 |
