= Dolgy =

Dolgy (Russian: До́лгий; masculine), Dolgaya (До́лгая; feminine), or Dolgoye (До́лгое; neuter) is the name of several inhabited localities in Russia.

== Modern localities ==
=== Arkhangelsk Oblast ===
As of 2010, one rural locality in Arkhangelsk Oblast bears this name:

- Dolgoye, Arkhangelsk Oblast, a village in Voznesensky Selsoviet of Primorsky District

=== Belgorod Oblast ===
As of 2010, five rural localities in Belgorod Oblast bear this name:

- Dolgy, Belgorod Oblast, a khutor in Prokhorovsky District
- Dolgoye, Gubkinsky District, Belgorod Oblast, a selo in Gubkinsky District
- Dolgoye, Korochansky District, Belgorod Oblast, a khutor in Korochansky District
- Dolgoye, Valuysky District, Belgorod Oblast, a selo in Kukuyevsky Rural Okrug of Valuysky District
- Dolgoye, Veydelevsky District, Belgorod Oblast, a selo in Veydelevsky District

=== Bryansk Oblast ===
As of 2010, three rural localities in Bryansk Oblast bear this name:

- Dolgy, Bryansk Oblast, a settlement in Pervomaysky Selsoviet of Karachevsky District
- Dolgoye, Rognedinsky District, Bryansk Oblast, a village in Vladimirovsky Selsoviet of Rognedinsky District
- Dolgoye, Surazhsky District, Bryansk Oblast, a settlement in Kulazhsky Selsoviet of Surazhsky District

=== Kaliningrad Oblast ===
As of 2010, one rural locality in Kaliningrad Oblast bears this name:

- Dolgoye, Kaliningrad Oblast, a settlement in Alexeyevsky Rural Okrug of Krasnoznamensky District

=== Kaluga Oblast ===
As of 2010, four rural localities in Kaluga Oblast bear this name:

- Dolgoye, Khvastovichsky District, Kaluga Oblast, a selo in Khvastovichsky District
- Dolgoye, Mosalsky District, Kaluga Oblast, a village in Mosalsky District
- Dolgoye, Ulyanovsky District, Kaluga Oblast, a village in Ulyanovsky District
- Dolgaya, Kaluga Oblast, a village in Ulyanovsky District

=== Kostroma Oblast ===
As of 2010, one rural locality in Kostroma Oblast bears this name:

- Dolgaya, Kostroma Oblast, a village in Belkovskoye Settlement of Vokhomsky District

=== Kurgan Oblast ===
As of 2010, one rural locality in Kurgan Oblast bears this name:

- Dolgaya, Kurgan Oblast, a village in Talovsky Selsoviet of Yurgamyshsky District

=== Kursk Oblast ===
As of 2010, five rural localities in Kursk Oblast bear this name:

- Dolgy, Bolshesoldatsky District, Kursk Oblast, a settlement in Lyubimovsky Selsoviet of Bolshesoldatsky District
- Dolgy, Dmitriyevsky District, Kursk Oblast, a settlement in Selinsky Selsoviet of Dmitriyevsky District
- Dolgy, Fatezhsky District, Kursk Oblast, a khutor in Kolychevsky Selsoviet of Fatezhsky District
- Dolgoye, Kursky District, Kursk Oblast, a village in Klyukvinsky Selsoviet of Kursky District
- Dolgoye, Zolotukhinsky District, Kursk Oblast, a selo in Svobodinsky Selsoviet of Zolotukhinsky District

=== Lipetsk Oblast ===
As of 2010, five rural localities in Lipetsk Oblast bear this name:

- Dolgoye, Bigildinsky Selsoviet, Dankovsky District, Lipetsk Oblast, a selo in Bigildinsky Selsoviet of Dankovsky District
- Dolgoye, Voskresensky Selsoviet, Dankovsky District, Lipetsk Oblast, a selo in Voskresensky Selsoviet of Dankovsky District
- Dolgoye, Khlevensky District, Lipetsk Oblast, a selo in Dmitryashevsky Selsoviet of Khlevensky District
- Dolgoye, Yeletsky District, Lipetsk Oblast, a selo in Volchansky Selsoviet of Yeletsky District
- Dolgaya, Lipetsk Oblast, a village in Stebayevsky Selsoviet of Lipetsky District

=== Nizhny Novgorod Oblast ===
As of 2010, one rural locality in Nizhny Novgorod Oblast bears this name:

- Dolgaya, Nizhny Novgorod Oblast, a village in Ananyevsky Selsoviet of Knyagininsky District

=== Novgorod Oblast ===
As of 2010, one rural locality in Novgorod Oblast bears this name:

- Dolgoye, Novgorod Oblast, a village in Dolgovskoye Settlement of Moshenskoy District

=== Oryol Oblast ===
As of 2010, six inhabited localities in Oryol Oblast bear this name:

- Dolgoye, Dolzhansky District, Oryol Oblast, an urban-type settlement in Dolzhansky District
- Dolgoye, Mtsensky District, Oryol Oblast, a village in Alyabyevsky Selsoviet of Mtsensky District
- Dolgoye, Sverdlovsky District, Oryol Oblast, a village in Yakovlevsky Selsoviet of Sverdlovsky District
- Dolgoye, Verkhovsky District, Oryol Oblast, a village in Galichinsky Selsoviet of Verkhovsky District
- Dolgoye, Zalegoshchensky District, Oryol Oblast, a selo in Lomovsky Selsoviet of Zalegoshchensky District
- Dolgaya, Oryol Oblast, a village in Nizhne-Zalegoshchensky Selsoviet of Zalegoshchensky District

=== Pskov Oblast ===
As of 2010, one rural locality in Pskov Oblast bears this name:

- Dolgaya, Pskov Oblast, a village in Velikoluksky District

=== Rostov Oblast ===
As of 2010, one rural locality in Rostov Oblast bears this name:

- Dolgy, Rostov Oblast, a khutor in Maloorlovskoye Rural Settlement of Martynovsky District

=== Smolensk Oblast ===
As of 2010, two rural localities in Smolensk Oblast bear this name:

- Dolgoye, Akatovskoye Rural Settlement, Gagarinsky District, Smolensk Oblast, a village in Akatovskoye Rural Settlement of Gagarinsky District
- Dolgoye, Gagarinskoye Rural Settlement, Gagarinsky District, Smolensk Oblast, a village in Gagarinskoye Rural Settlement of Gagarinsky District

=== Tula Oblast ===
As of 2010, two rural localities in Tula Oblast bear this name:

- Dolgoye, Kireyevsky District, Tula Oblast, a selo in Podosinovsky Rural Okrug of Kireyevsky District
- Dolgoye, Leninsky District, Tula Oblast, a village in Inshinsky Rural Okrug of Leninsky District

=== Volgograd Oblast ===
As of 2010, two rural localities in Volgograd Oblast bear this name:

- Dolgy, Leninsky District, Volgograd Oblast, a khutor in Pokrovsky Selsoviet of Leninsky District
- Dolgy, Uryupinsky District, Volgograd Oblast, a khutor in Okladnensky Selsoviet of Uryupinsky District

=== Voronezh Oblast ===
As of 2010, two rural localities in Voronezh Oblast bear this name:

- Dolgy, Voronezh Oblast, a khutor in Sinelipyagovskoye Rural Settlement of Nizhnedevitsky District
- Dolgoye, Voronezh Oblast, a selo in Zemlyanskoye Rural Settlement of Semiluksky District

== Abolished localities ==
- Dolgy, Astrakhan Oblast, a rural locality (a settlement) in Mayachninsky Selsoviet of Ikryaninsky District of Astrakhan Oblast; abolished in August 2013
