= Administrative divisions of Oryol Oblast =

Administrative districts of Russian federal subject

Oryol Oblast Russia
- Administrative center: Oryol

Administrative structure (as of 2012)
- Districts: 24
- Cities/towns: 7
- Urban-type settlements: 13
- Selsovets: 223

Municipal structure (as of 2002)
- Rural settlements: 3,054 (inhabited); 199 (uninhabited)

Oryol Oblast is a federal subject of Russia.

== Administrative and municipal divisions ==
- Cities and towns under the oblast's jurisdiction:
  - Oryol (Орёл) (administrative center)
    - city districts:
      - Severny (Северный)
      - Sovetsky (Советский)
      - Zavodskoy (Заводской)
      - Zheleznodorozhny (Железнодорожный)
  - Livny (Ливны)
  - Mtsensk (Мценск)
- Districts:
  - Bolkhovsky (Болховский)
    - Towns under the district's jurisdiction:
      - Bolkhov (Болхов)
    - with 13 selsovets under the district's jurisdiction.
  - Dmitrovsky (Дмитровский)
    - Towns under the district's jurisdiction:
      - Dmitrovsk (Дмитровск)
    - with 12 selsovets under the district's jurisdiction.
  - Dolzhansky (Должанский)
    - Urban-type settlements under the district's jurisdiction:
      - Dolgoye (Долгое)
    - with 7 selsovets under the district's jurisdiction.
  - Glazunovsky (Глазуновский)
    - Urban-type settlements under the district's jurisdiction:
      - Glazunovka (Глазуновка)
    - with 7 selsovets under the district's jurisdiction.
  - Khotynetsky (Хотынецкий)
    - Urban-type settlements under the district's jurisdiction:
      - Khotynets (Хотынец)
    - with 8 selsovets under the district's jurisdiction.
  - Kolpnyansky (Колпнянский)
    - Urban-type settlements under the district's jurisdiction:
      - Kolpna (Колпна)
    - with 9 selsovets under the district's jurisdiction.
  - Korsakovsky (Корсаковский)
    - with 7 selsovets under the district's jurisdiction.
  - Krasnozorensky (Краснозоренский)
    - with 5 selsovets under the district's jurisdiction.
  - Kromskoy (Кромской)
    - Urban-type settlements under the district's jurisdiction:
      - Kromy (Кромы)
    - with 12 selsovets under the district's jurisdiction.
  - Livensky (Ливенский)
    - with 16 selsovets under the district's jurisdiction.
  - Maloarkhangelsky (Малоархангельский)
    - Towns under the district's jurisdiction:
      - Maloarkhangelsk (Малоархангельск)
    - with 7 selsovets under the district's jurisdiction.
  - Mtsensky (Мценский)
    - with 14 selsovets under the district's jurisdiction.
  - Novoderevenkovsky (Новодеревеньковский)
    - Urban-type settlements under the district's jurisdiction:
      - Khomutovo (Хомутово)
    - with 7 selsovets under the district's jurisdiction.
  - Novosilsky (Новосильский)
    - Towns under the district's jurisdiction:
      - Novosil (Новосиль)
    - with 7 selsovets under the district's jurisdiction.
  - Orlovsky (Орловский)
    - Urban-type settlements under the district's jurisdiction:
      - Znamenka (Знаменка)
    - with 16 selsovets under the district's jurisdiction.
  - Pokrovsky (Покровский)
    - Urban-type settlements under the district's jurisdiction:
      - Pokrovskoye (Покровское)
    - with 13 selsovets under the district's jurisdiction.
  - Shablykinsky (Шаблыкинский)
    - Urban-type settlements under the district's jurisdiction:
      - Shablykino (Шаблыкино)
    - with 7 selsovets under the district's jurisdiction.
  - Soskovsky (Сосковский)
    - with 7 selsovets under the district's jurisdiction.
  - Sverdlovsky (Свердловский)
    - Urban-type settlements under the district's jurisdiction:
      - Zmiyovka (Змиёвка)
    - with 7 selsovets under the district's jurisdiction.
  - Trosnyansky (Троснянский)
    - with 8 selsovets under the district's jurisdiction.
  - Uritsky (Урицкий)
    - Urban-type settlements under the district's jurisdiction:
      - Naryshkino (Нарышкино)
    - with 7 selsovets under the district's jurisdiction.
  - Verkhovsky (Верховский)
    - Urban-type settlements under the district's jurisdiction:
      - Verkhovye (Верховье)
    - with 10 selsovets under the district's jurisdiction.
  - Zalegoshchensky (Залегощенский)
    - Urban-type settlements under the district's jurisdiction:
      - Zalegoshch (Залегощь)
    - with 10 selsovets under the district's jurisdiction.
  - Znamensky (Знаменский)
    - with 7 selsovets under the district's jurisdiction.
