= Grachyovka =

Grachyovka (Russian: Грачёвка) is the name of several rural localities in Russia.

== Republic of Bashkortostan ==
As of 2010, one rural locality in the Republic of Bashkortostan bears this name:

- Grachyovka, Republic of Bashkortostan, a village in Shaymuratovsky Selsoviet of Karmaskalinsky District

== Belgorod Oblast ==
As of 2010, one rural locality in Belgorod Oblast bears this name:

- Grachyovka, Belgorod Oblast, a selo in Novooskolsky District

== Kaliningrad Oblast ==
As of 2010, one rural locality in Kaliningrad Oblast bears this name:

- Grachyovka, Kaliningrad Oblast, a settlement in Krasnotorovsky Rural Okrug of Zelenogradsky District

== Kaluga Oblast ==
As of 2010, two rural localities in Kaluga Oblast bear this name:

- Grachyovka, Mosalsky District, Kaluga Oblast, a village in Mosalsky District
- Grachyovka, Zhukovsky District, Kaluga Oblast, a village in Zhukovsky District

== Krasnodar Krai ==
As of 2010, one rural locality in Krasnodar Krai bears this name:

- Grachyovka, Krasnodar Krai, a settlement in Umansky Rural Okrug of Leningradsky District

== Kursk Oblast ==
As of 2010, two rural localities in Kursk Oblast bear this name:

- Grachyovka, Fatezhsky District, Kursk Oblast, a village in Glebovsky Selsoviet of Fatezhsky District
- Grachyovka, Manturovsky District, Kursk Oblast, a village in 2-y Zaseymsky Selsoviet of Manturovsky District

== Lipetsk Oblast ==
As of 2010, two rural localities in Lipetsk Oblast bear this name:

- Grachyovka, Usmansky District, Lipetsk Oblast, a selo in Grachyovsky Selsoviet of Usmansky District
- Grachyovka, Volovsky District, Lipetsk Oblast, a village in Naberezhansky Selsoviet of Volovsky District

== Orenburg Oblast ==
As of 2010, four rural localities in Orenburg Oblast bear this name:

- Grachyovka, Grachyovsky District, Orenburg Oblast, a selo in Grachyovsky Selsoviet of Grachyovsky District
- Grachyovka, Krasnogvardeysky District, Orenburg Oblast, a selo in Yashkinsky Selsoviet of Krasnogvardeysky District
- Grachyovka, Kurmanayevsky District, Orenburg Oblast, a selo in Grachyovsky Selsoviet of Kurmanayevsky District
- Grachyovka, Ponomaryovsky District, Orenburg Oblast, a settlement in Maksimovsky Selsoviet of Ponomaryovsky District

== Oryol Oblast ==
As of 2010, nine rural localities in Oryol Oblast bear this name:

- Grachyovka, Dolzhansky District, Oryol Oblast, a village in Uspensky Selsoviet of Dolzhansky District
- Grachyovka, Khotynetsky District, Oryol Oblast, a village in Studenovsky Selsoviet of Khotynetsky District
- Grachyovka, Orlovsky District, Oryol Oblast, a village in Bolshekulikovsky Selsoviet of Orlovsky District
- Grachyovka, Ivanovsky Selsoviet, Pokrovsky District, Oryol Oblast, a village in Ivanovsky Selsoviet of Pokrovsky District
- Grachyovka, Stolbetsky Selsoviet, Pokrovsky District, Oryol Oblast, a village in Stolbetsky Selsoviet of Pokrovsky District
- Grachyovka, Uritsky District, Oryol Oblast, a village in Arkhangelsky Selsoviet of Uritsky District
- Grachyovka, Verkhovsky District, Oryol Oblast, a settlement in Vasilyevsky Selsoviet of Verkhovsky District
- Grachyovka, Bortnovsky Selsoviet, Zalegoshchensky District, Oryol Oblast, a khutor in Bortnovsky Selsoviet of Zalegoshchensky District
- Grachyovka, Grachyovsky Selsoviet, Zalegoshchensky District, Oryol Oblast, a selo in Grachyovsky Selsoviet of Zalegoshchensky District

== Penza Oblast ==
As of 2010, one rural locality in Penza Oblast bears this name:

- Grachyovka, Penza Oblast, a village in Potodeyevsky Selsoviet of Narovchatsky District

== Ryazan Oblast ==
As of 2010, three rural localities in Ryazan Oblast bear this name:

- Grachyovka, Korablinsky District, Ryazan Oblast, a village in Kovalinsky Rural Okrug of Korablinsky District
- Grachyovka, Sasovsky District, Ryazan Oblast, a settlement in Pridorozhny Rural Okrug of Sasovsky District
- Grachyovka, Zakharovsky District, Ryazan Oblast, a village in Dobro-Pchelsky Rural Okrug of Zakharovsky District

== Samara Oblast ==
As of 2010, three rural localities in Samara Oblast bear this name:

- Grachyovka, Kinelsky District, Samara Oblast, a selo in Kinelsky District
- Grachyovka, Koshkinsky District, Samara Oblast, a selo in Koshkinsky District
- Grachyovka, Krasnoyarsky District, Samara Oblast, a settlement in Krasnoyarsky District

== Saratov Oblast ==
As of 2010, two rural localities in Saratov Oblast bear this name:

- Grachyovka, Arkadaksky District, Saratov Oblast, a selo in Arkadaksky District
- Grachyovka, Petrovsky District, Saratov Oblast, a selo in Petrovsky District

== Stavropol Krai ==
As of 2010, one rural locality in Stavropol Krai bears this name:

- Grachyovka, Stavropol Krai, a selo in Grachyovsky Selsoviet of Grachyovsky District

== Tambov Oblast ==
As of 2010, two rural localities in Tambov Oblast bear this name:

- Grachyovka, Mordovsky District, Tambov Oblast, a selo in Lavrovsky Selsoviet of Mordovsky District
- Grachyovka, Pichayevsky District, Tambov Oblast, a settlement in Yegorovsky Selsoviet of Pichayevsky District

== Tula Oblast ==
As of 2010, one rural locality in Tula Oblast bears this name:

- Grachyovka, Tula Oblast, a village in Mikhaylovskaya Volost of Kurkinsky District

== Ulyanovsk Oblast ==
As of 2010, one rural locality in Ulyanovsk Oblast bears this name:

- Grachyovka, Ulyanovsk Oblast, a village in Yermolovsky Rural Okrug of Veshkaymsky District

== Vladimir Oblast ==
As of 2010, one rural locality in Vladimir Oblast bears this name:

- Grachyovka, Vladimir Oblast, a village in Vyaznikovsky District
