= Shablykino =

Set index of articles associated with the same name

Shablykino (Russian: Шаблыкино) is the name of several inhabited localities in Russia.

Urban localities

- Shablykino, Oryol Oblast, an urban-type settlement in Shablykinsky District of Oryol Oblast

Rural localities

- Shablykino, Kostroma Oblast, a village in Podolskoye Settlement of Krasnoselsky District of Kostroma Oblast
- Shablykino, Istrinsky District, Moscow Oblast, a village in Novopetrovskoye Rural Settlement of Istrinsky District of Moscow Oblast
- Shablykino, Pushkinsky District, Moscow Oblast, a village in Tsarevskoye Rural Settlement of Pushkinsky District of Moscow Oblast
- Shablykino, Tver Oblast, a village in Ulyaninskoye Rural Settlement of Krasnokholmsky District of Tver Oblast
- Shablykino, Tyumen Oblast, a selo in Shablykinsky Rural Okrug of Ishimsky District of Tyumen Oblast
- Shablykino, Vladimir Oblast, a village in Alexandrovsky District of Vladimir Oblast
