= Zmiyovka =

Set index of articles associated with the same name

Zmiyovka (Russian: Змиёвка) or Zmiyevka (Змиевка) is the name of several inhabited localities in Russia.

Urban localities

- Zmiyovka, Oryol Oblast, an urban-type settlement in Sverdlovsky District of Oryol Oblast

Rural localities

- Zmiyevka, Penza Oblast, a settlement in Vysokinsky Selsoviet of Bashmakovsky District of Penza Oblast
