= Coat of arms of Chelyabinsk =

Official municipal coat of arms of Chelyabinsk, Russia

- Adopted: 12 September 2000
- Shield: A camel or on a field cendrée depicting a wall, with another field vert at the base

The coat of arms of Chelyabinsk (Russian: Герб Челябинска, romanized: Gerb Chelyabinska) is the official municipal coat of arms of Chelyabinsk, Russia. The current design, adopted on 12 September 2000 by the City Duma, features a gold camel loaded with goods on its back. The shield is divided into two fields, with the top being taller than the first. The top field is silver and is designed to resemble a brick wall. The bottom field is green.

The city has seen the usage of other coats of arms in addition to the current. The first official coat of arms was adopted in 1782. The arms then changed during Soviet times and again changed in 1994, before the current design was adopted in 2000.

== Design and symbolism ==
The camel symbolizes prosperity and wealth and the importance of trade within Chelyabinsk. The camel reflects the city's history- a trade route to India passed through the city, so camels loaded with goods frequently traveled through. The silver coloring of the top field symbolizes purity and the brick wall pattern symbolizes protection. The wall also references the city's history, as Chelyabinsk was founded as a fortress in 1736. The green symbolizes hope and abundance, the gold strength, wealth, and intelligence.

== History ==
=== First coat of arms ===
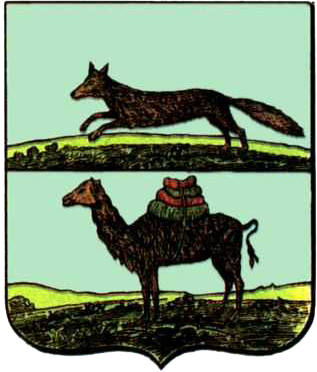
The first coat of arms of Chelyabinsk

The first coat of arms for the city was approved by Catherine II on 8 June 1782. It was designed by councillor A.O. Volkov and consisted of a shield that was split in half horizontally. The top half featured a marten running along a green field. The marten was a symbol of the Ufa governorship and was featured on the governorship's coat of arms, so it was incorporated to represent the city's position within the governorship. A camel loaded with goods was on the bottom half, representing the commercial significance of the city. The camel symbolism dates back to at least 1737, when Vasily Tatishchev presented two proposals for the emblem of Isetsky District, where the city was located at the time. One proposal featured a camel tied down as the principal charge and both featured a camel head and neck on the crest. The camel likely symbolized Russia's interests in building fortresses in the Asian region to protect the economic benefits present.

=== Second coat of arms ===
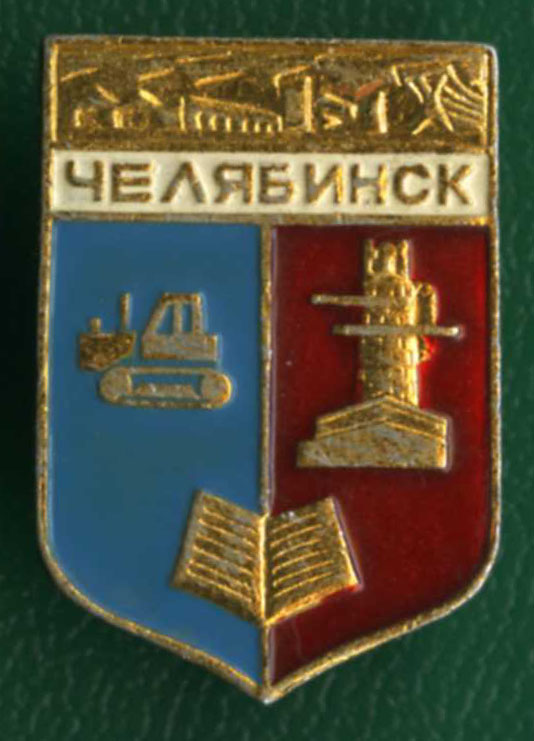
Badge of one of the city's second coat of arms

During Soviet times, the 1782 coat of arms was abolished and replaced with a couple of different designs. One design featured a red shield with a ladle, gear, camel, and sable. The second, pictured to the left, featured a shield split in half vertically, with a blue side on the left and a red side on the right. The blue side featured a tractor and the red side featured a tower of some kind. An open book was featured in the middle of the two. The city's name appeared above that and a cityscape appeared above the name.

=== Third coat of arms ===
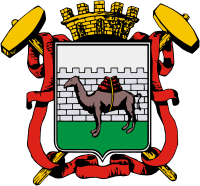
The city's third coat of arms

The third coat of arms was adopted on 13 September 1994. It featured the same camel from the 1782 design, but not the marten. The camel was featured on a silver shield, which represents purity and prudence. A brick wall pattern was featured on the silver shield which symbolized protection. The camel stands on a green field, which symbolizes hope and abundance. A five-pronged gold crown was featured on the crest of the emblem, representing the city's status as the administrative center of the region. Two crossing golden hammers, representing industry, were located behind the shield, with a red ribbon draped on both hammers. The emblem was designed by Andrey Viktorovich Startsev and V.A. Kryukov. The Heraldic Council did not approve of the design, however, and it did not appear in the State Heraldic Register of the Russian Federation.

=== Fourth coat of arms ===
In 2000, elements of the third coat of arms were changed by a small group of authors and was adopted on 12 September of that year. The exterior elements of the emblem were removed and the camel was changed to be only one color- gold.
