= Glazunovka =

Glazunovka (Russian: Глазуновка) is the name of several inhabited localities.

== Kazakhstan ==
- Glazunovka, a village in the Kostanay District of the Kostanay Region. Since 2018, it has been called Aysary.

== Russia ==
Urban localities

- Glazunovka, Oryol Oblast, an urban-type settlement in Glazunovsky District, Oryol Oblast

Rural localities

- Glazunovka, Chelyabinsk Oblast, a settlement in Uysky Selsoviet of Uysky District of Chelyabinsk Oblast
- Glazunovka, Sverdlovsk Oblast, a village in Verkhotursky District of Sverdlovsk Oblast
