= Kugulta =

Set index of articles associated with the same name

Kugulta (Russian: Кугульта) is the name of several rural localities in Russia:

- Kugulta, Rostov Oblast, a khutor in Yulovskoye Rural Settlement of Tselinsky District of Rostov Oblast
- Kugulta, Stavropol Krai, a selo in Kugultinsky Selsoviet of Grachyovsky District of Stavropol Krai
