= List of subjects in the State Heraldic Register of the Russian Federation =

This is a list of subjects in the State Heraldic Register of the Russian Federation (Russian: Государственный геральдический регистр Российской Федерации, tr.: Gosudarstvenny geraldicheskiy registr Rossiyskoi Federatsii) as of January 1, 2005 (1000 entries at the time). The register systematizes the usage of official state symbols and is governed by the Heraldic Council of the President of the Russian Federation.

No.	Subject
1	Flag of the Russian SFSR
2	Flag of Russian Federation
3	Coat of arms of Russian Federation
4	Standard of the president of the Russian Federation
5	Flag of the president of the Russian Federation
6	Naval Ensign of the Russian Federation
7	Guards Navy Ensign
8	Medallic Naval Ensign
9	Guards Medallic Naval Ensign
10	Jack and the Fortress Ensign
11	Pennant of warships
12	Flag of the Auxiliary Fleet ships (cutters) of the Navy
13	Flag of the hydrographic ships (cutters) of the Navy
14	Flag of the lifeboats of the Navy
15	Flag of the Commander-in-Chief of the Navy
16	Flag of the Head of the General Staff of the Navy
17	Flag of the Fleet Commander
18	Flag of the Flotilla (Squadron) Commander
19	Flag of the naval unit commander
20	Rank flag of the naval unit commander
21	Rank flag of the division commander
22	Rank flag of the raid's major
23	Naval ensign of the ships (cutters) of Internal Troops of the Ministry for Internal Affairs
24	Pennant of the ships (cutters) of Internal Troops of the Ministry for Internal Affairs
25	Flag of the President, Commander-in-Chief of the Russian Armed Forces
26	Flag of the Minister of Defence of the Russian Federation
27	Flag of the Head of General Staff of the Russian Armed Forces
28	Flag of the ships and cutters of Russian Frontier Troops
29	Medallic flag of the ships and cutters of Russian Frontier Troops
30	Naval jack of the 1st and 2nd class ships of the Frontier Troops
