= Zusha =

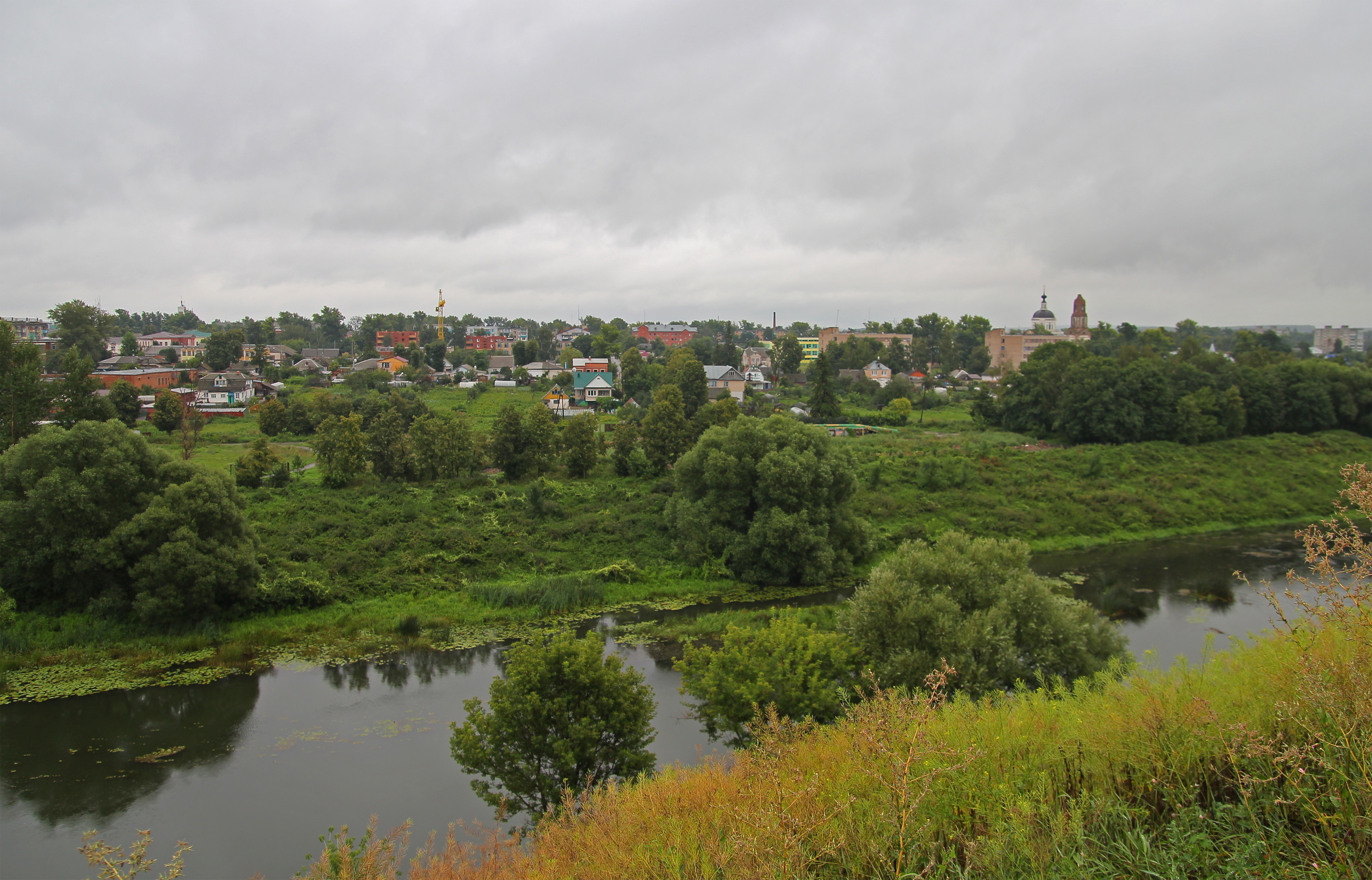
- Zusha River in Mtsensk

- Mouth of the Zusha
- Native name: Зуша (Russian)

Location
- Country: Russia

Physical characteristics
- Mouth: Oka
  - coordinates: 53.4496°N 36.3854°E
- Length: 234 km (145 mi)
- Basin size: 6,950 km^{2} (2,680 sq mi)

Basin features
- Progression: Oka→ Volga→ Caspian Sea

The Zusha (Russian: Зуша) is a river in Tula and Oryol Oblast in Russia, a right tributary of the Oka. The length of the river is 234 km. The area of its basin is 6,950 km². The Zusha freezes up in early December and stays icebound until late March. The Neruch is its biggest tributary. The Zusha is navigable from Mtsensk.

== Notes and references ==
[
