= Ivan, Russia =

Village in Oryol Oblast, Russia

Coordinates: 53°00′23″N 36°51′00″E

Ivan (Russian: Ива́нь) is a village in Zalegoshchensky District of Oryol Oblast, Russia.
