= Khotynetsky District =

Khotynetsky District Хотынецкий район (Russian)
- District
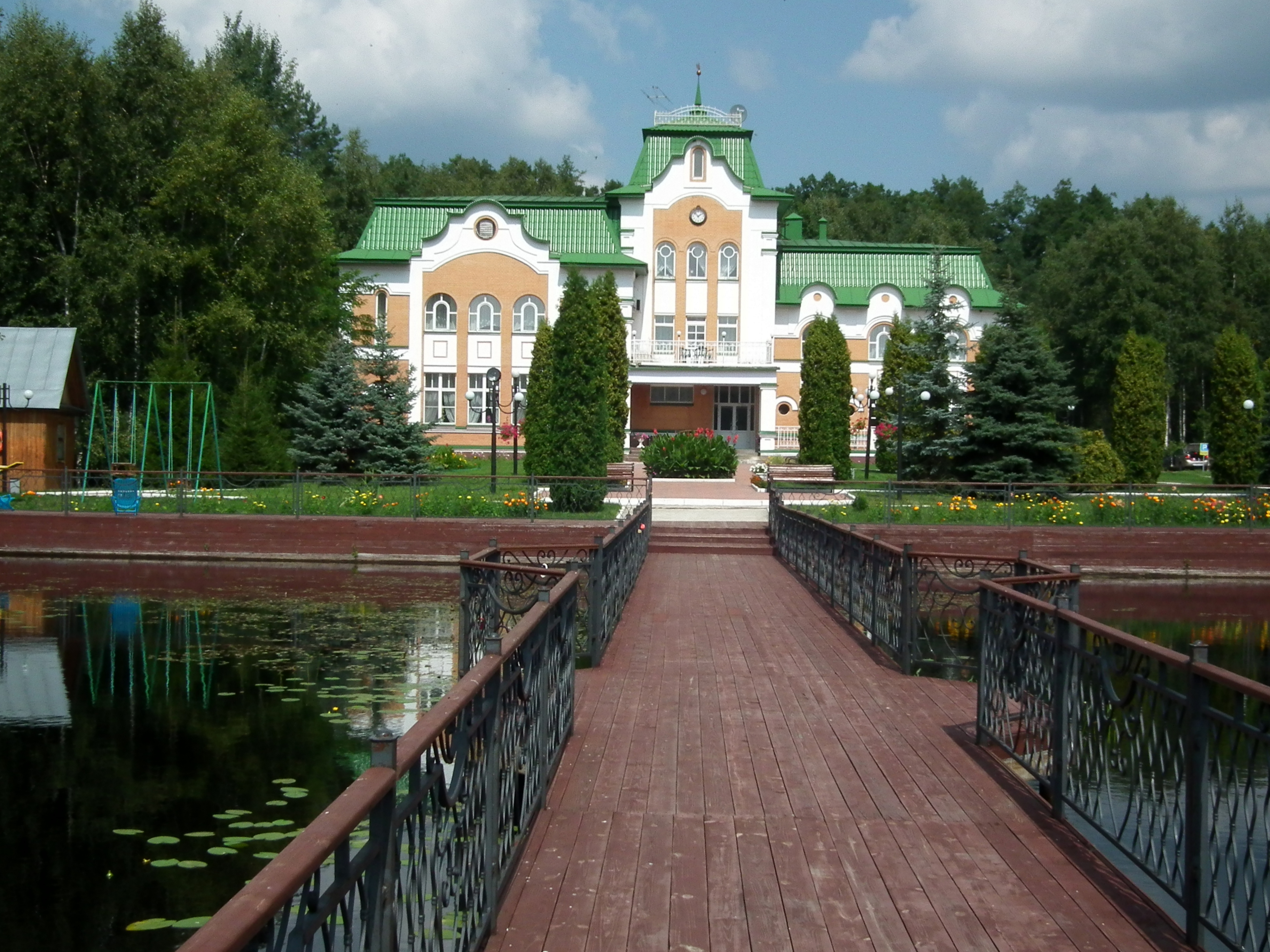
- Resort hotel in Orlovsky Forest, Khotynetsky

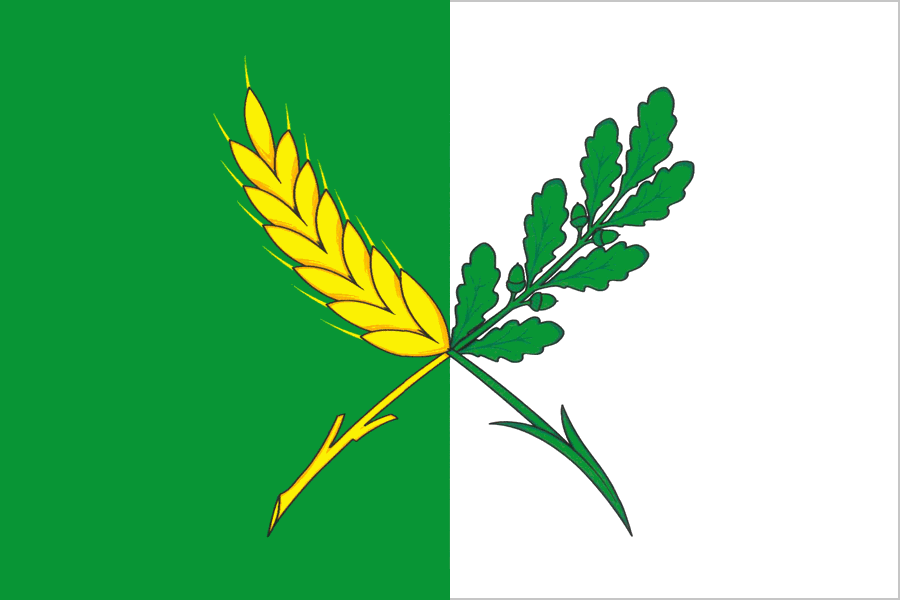
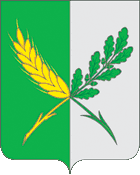
- Flag Coat of arms
- Location of Khotynetsky District in Oryol Oblast
- Coordinates: 53°07′48″N 35°24′00″E
- Country: Russia
- Federal subject: Oryol Oblast
- Established: 21 August 1939
- Administrative center: Khotynets

Area
  - Total: 800 km^{2} (310 sq mi)

Population (2010 Census)
  - Total: 10,183
  - Density: 13/km^{2} (33/sq mi)
  - Urban: 38.0%
  - Rural: 62.0%

Administrative structure
  - Administrative divisions: 1 Urban-type settlements, 8 Selsoviets
  - Inhabited localities: 1 urban-type settlements, 91 rural localities

Municipal structure
  - Municipally incorporated as: Khotynetsky Municipal District
  - Municipal divisions: 1 urban settlements, 8 rural settlements
- Time zone: UTC+3 (MSK)
- OKTMO ID: 54657000
- Website: http://www.hot-adm.ru/

Khotynetsky District (Russian: Хотыне́цкий райо́н) is an administrative and municipal district (raion), one of the twenty-four in Oryol Oblast, Russia.

The area of the district is 800 square kilometers (310 sq mi).
Its administrative center is an urban-type settlement of Khotynets.
Population: 9,376 (est. 2018).

== Geography ==
=== Location ===
Khotynetsky District located in the Central Russian Upland of the East European Plain, it is in the northwest of the oblast.

Borders with Khvastovichsky District (Kaluga Oblast) in the north, Znamensky District in the nord-east, Uritsky District in the south-east, Shablykinsky District in the south-west, and with Karachevsky District (Bryansk Oblast) in the west.

=== Climate ===
District has a humid continental climate (Köppen climate classification — Dfb). Winters are moderately cold and changeable. The first half is softer second with often warmings. Summers is warm, in separate years — could be rainy or hot and droughty.

== Demographics ==
Khotynetsky District population
- 1959 Census: 25 288
- 1970 Census: 32 818
- 1979 Census: 22 852
- 1989 Census: 13 032
- 2002 Census: 12 098
- 2010 Census: 10 183
- Estimate 2018: 9 376

According to the Federal State Statistics Service, in January 2018 the number of residents came to 9 376. It is the 17th place among 24 districts of Oryol oblast for 2018.

The population of the administrative center accounts for 40.05% of the district's total population.

Largest ethnic group is Russians.

== Transportation ==
=== Automotive ===
Important highways of federal and regional values:

- R 120
- 54K-3
- 54K-18

=== Railway ===
On the territory of the Khotynetsky District is the historical Oryol-Vitebsk Railway.

=== Pipeline ===
Through Khotynetsky District laid the Druzhba oil pipeline.

== Landmarks ==
The pearl of the Khotynetsky District is the national park «Orlovskoye Polesye».

== Notable residents ==
- Alexei Badayev (1883–1951), Soviet politician, nominal head of RSFSR under Stalin; born in Yuryevo
- Gennady Zyuganov (born 1944), politician, General Secretary of the Communist Party of the Russian Federation; born in the village of Mymrino
