= Orlovskoye Polesye National Park =

National park in Russia

Coordinates: 53.2833°N 35.3°E

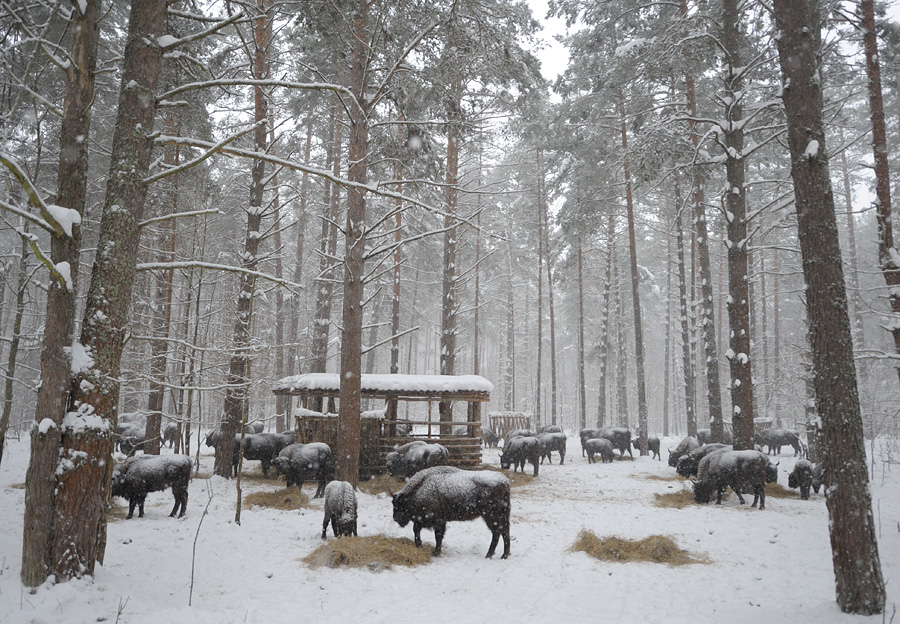
Bison feeding during the winter at Orlovskoye Polesye

The Orlovskoye Polesye national park (Russian: Орловское Полесье) is a protected area in Russia.

It is situated in the middle of the Central Russian Upland straddling the Znamensky and Khotynetsky (two natural climate zones) districts of Oryol Oblast, of area 77,745 ha. It was established by a decree of the Russian Government no.6 of January 9, 1994. This park is a home to European bison.
