= Mtsensky District =

Mtsensky District Мценский район (Russian)
- District
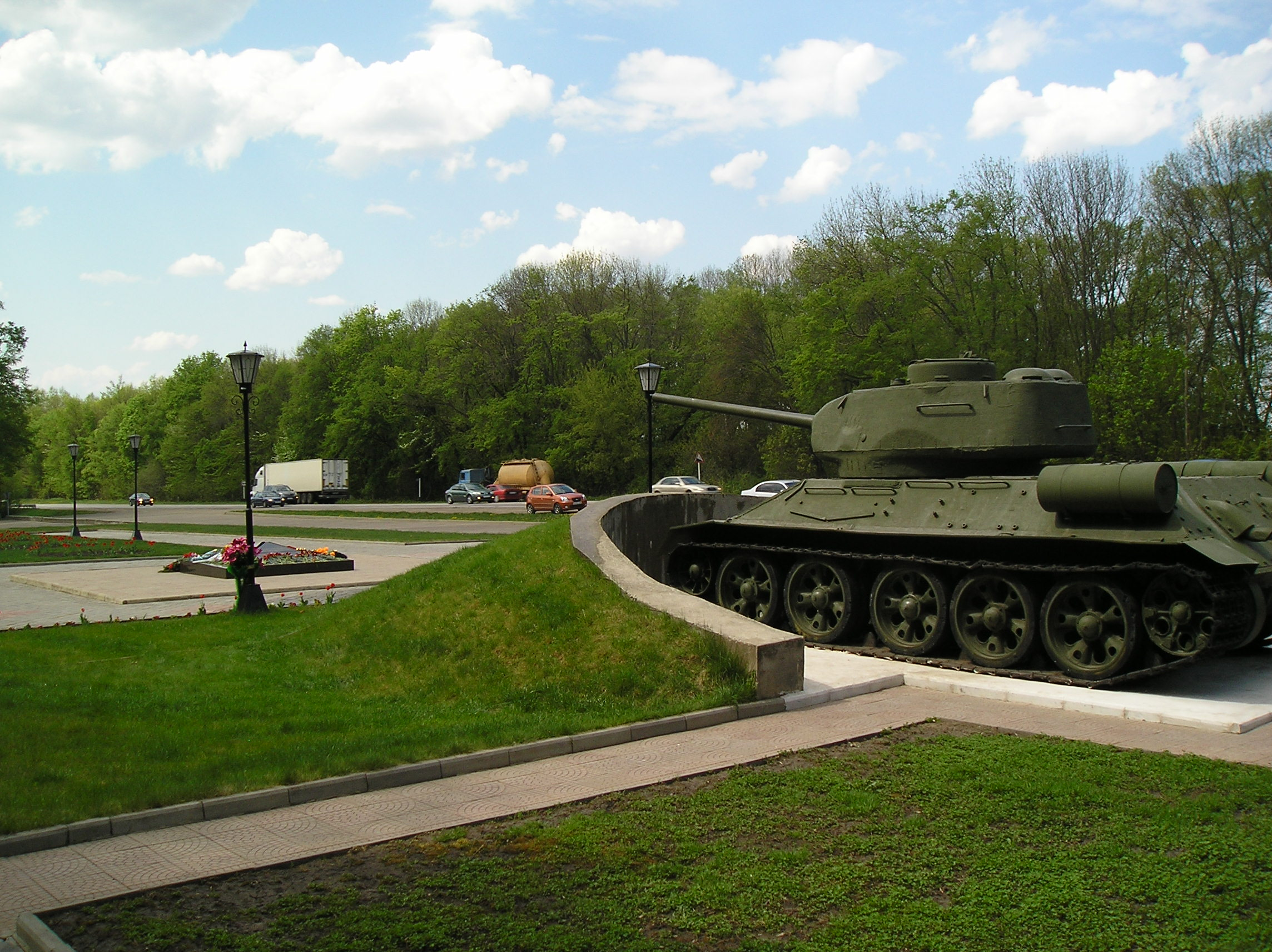
- Tank Memorial in Pervyi Voin, Mtsensky District

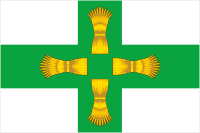
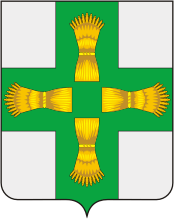
- Flag Coat of arms
- Location of Mtsensky District in Oryol Oblast
- Coordinates: 53°16′N 36°33′E
- Country: Russia
- Federal subject: Oryol Oblast
- Established: 30 July 1928
- Administrative center: Mtsensk

Area
  - Total: 1,666 km^{2} (643 sq mi)

Population (2010 Census)
  - Total: 19,233
  - Density: 11.54/km^{2} (29.90/sq mi)
  - Urban: 0%
  - Rural: 100%

Administrative structure
  - Administrative divisions: 14 selsoviet
  - Inhabited localities: 262 rural localities

Municipal structure
  - Municipally incorporated as: Mtsensky Municipal District
  - Municipal divisions: 0 urban settlements, 14 rural settlements
- Time zone: UTC+3 (MSK)
- OKTMO ID: 54636000
- Website: http://mcradm.orel.ru/

Mtsensky District (Russian: Мце́нский райо́н) is an administrative and municipal district (raion), one of the twenty-four in Oryol Oblast, Russia. It is located in the north of the oblast. The area of the district is 1,665.8 square kilometers (643.2 sq mi). Its administrative center is the town of Mtsensk (which is not administratively a part of the district). Population: 19,233 (2010 Census); 20,757 (2002 census); 22,317 (1989 Soviet census).

== Geography ==
Within the Oryol Oblast the Mtsensk District borders:

- the Bolkhovsky District (to the north-west)
- the Orlovsky District (to the south-west)
- the Zalegoshchensky District (to the south)
- the Novosilsky District (to the south-east)
- the Korsakovsky District (to the east)

The Chernsky District of Tula Oblast lies north of the Mtsensk District.

== Administrative and municipal status ==
Within the framework of administrative divisions, Mtsensky District is one of the twenty-four in the oblast. The town of Mtsensk serves as its administrative center, despite being incorporated separately as a town of oblast significance—an administrative unit with the status equal to that of the districts.

As a municipal division, the district is incorporated as Mtsensky Municipal District. The town of oblast significance of Mtsensk is incorporated separately from the district as Mtsensk Urban Okrug.
