= Zalegoshch =

Zalegoshch Залегощь
- Urban-type settlement
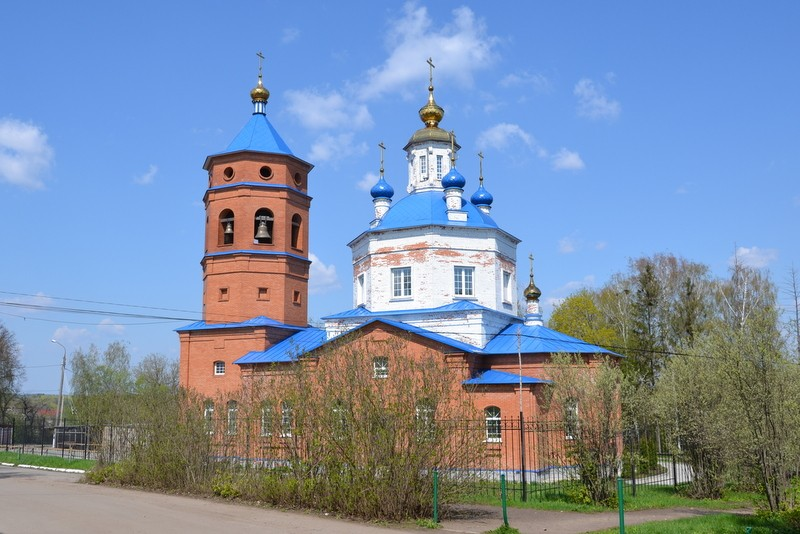
- Interactive map of Zalegoshch
- Location of Zalegoshch Zalegoshch (Oryol Oblast)
- Coordinates: 52°54′04″N 36°53′13″E
- Country: Russia
- Federal subject: Oryol Oblast
- Administrative district: Zalegoshchensky District

Population (2010 Census)
  - Total: 5,338
  - Estimate (2023): 4,374 (−18.1%)
- Time zone: UTC+3 (MSK)
- Postal code: 303560
- OKTMO ID: 54618151051

Zalegoshch (Russian: Залегощь) is an urban locality (an urban-type settlement) and the administrative center of Zalegoshchensky District of Oryol Oblast, Russia, located on the Neruch River, 63 kilometers (39 mi) east of Oryol. Population: 5,338 (2010 census); 6,005 (2002 census); 5,744 (1989 Soviet census).
