= Znamenka, Orlovsky District, Oryol Oblast =

Znamenka Знаменка
- Urban-type settlement
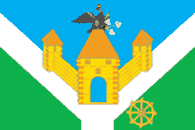
- Flag
- Interactive map of Znamenka
- Location of Znamenka Znamenka (Oryol Oblast)
- Coordinates: 52.8960°N 35.9867°E
- Country: Russia
- Federal subject: Oryol Oblast
- Administrative district: Orlovsky District

Population (2010 Census)
  - Total: 12,002
  - Estimate (2023): 9,711 (−19.1%)
- Time zone: UTC+3 (MSK)
- Postal code: 302520
- OKTMO ID: 54647152051

Znamenka (Russian: Знаменка) is an urban locality (an urban-type settlement) in Orlovsky District of Oryol Oblast, Russia. Population: 12,002 (2010 census); 12,099 (2002 census); 12,350 (1989 Soviet census).
