= Dolgoye, Veydelevsky District, Belgorod Oblast =

Dolgoye Долгое
- Selo
- Location within Belgorod Oblast Location within Russia
- Coordinates: 50°15′N 38°29′E
- Country: Russia
- Region: Belgorod Oblast
- District: Veydelevsky District
- Time zone: UTC+3:00

Dolgoye (Russian: Долгое) is a rural locality (a selo) and the administrative center of Dolzhanskoye Rural Settlement, Veydelevsky District, Belgorod Oblast, Russia. The population was 910 as of 2010. There are 11 streets.

== Geography ==
Dolgoye is located 22 km northeast of Veydelevka (the district's administrative centre) by road. Rossosh is the nearest rural locality.
