= Kolpnyansky District =

Kolpnyansky District Колпнянский район (Russian)
- District
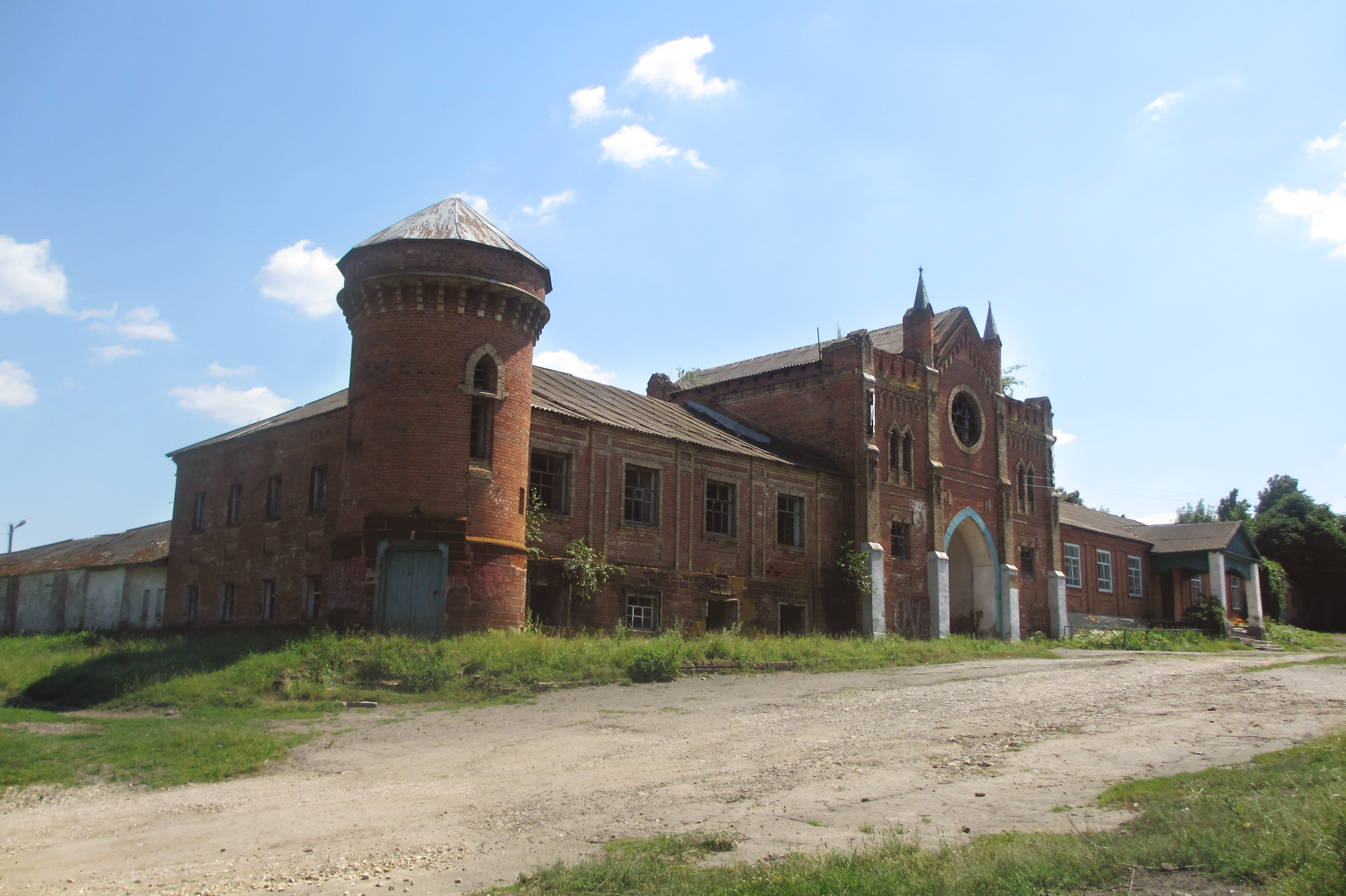
- Hunter's Castle, Kolpnyansky District

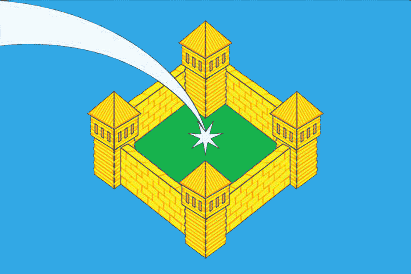
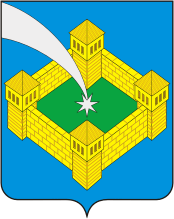
- Flag Coat of arms
- Location of Kolpnyansky District in Oryol Oblast
- Coordinates: 52°13′17″N 37°01′53″E
- Country: Russia
- Federal subject: Oryol Oblast
- Established: 30 July 1928
- Administrative center: Kolpna

Area
  - Total: 1,176.7 km^{2} (454.3 sq mi)

Population (2010 Census)
  - Total: 15,453
  - Density: 13.132/km^{2} (34.013/sq mi)
  - Urban: 42.8%
  - Rural: 57.2%

Administrative structure
  - Administrative divisions: 1 Urban-type settlements, 9 Selsoviets
  - Inhabited localities: 1 urban-type settlements, 135 rural localities

Municipal structure
  - Municipally incorporated as: Kolpnyansky Municipal District
  - Municipal divisions: 1 urban settlements, 9 rural settlements
- Time zone: UTC+3 (MSK)
- OKTMO ID: 54623000
- Website: http://kolpna-adm.ru/

Kolpnyansky District (Russian: Ко́лпнянский райо́н) is an administrative and municipal district (raion), one of the twenty-four in Oryol Oblast, Russia. It is located in the southeast of the oblast. The area of the district is 1,176.7 square kilometers (454.3 sq mi). Its administrative center is the urban locality (an urban-type settlement) of Kolpna. Population: 15,453 (2010 Census); 18,970 (2002 census); 22,406 (1989 Soviet census). The population of Kolpna accounts for 42.8% of the district's total population.
