= Dolgy, Fatezhsky District, Kursk Oblast =

Rural locality in Kursk Oblast, Russia

Dolgy Долгий
- Khutor
- Interactive map of Dolgy
- Location of Dolgy Dolgy (Kursk Oblast)
- Coordinates: 51°56′08″N 35°52′31″E
- Country: Russia
- Federal subject: Kursk Oblast
- Administrative district: Fatezhsky District
- SelsovietSelsoviet: Bolshezhirovsky

Population (2010 Census)
  - Total: 8
  - Estimate (2010): 8 (0%)

Municipal status
  - Municipal district: Fatezhsky Municipal District
  - Rural settlement: Bolshezhirovsky Selsoviet Rural Settlement
- Time zone: UTC+3 (MSK)
- Postal code: 307114
- Dialing code: +7 47144
- OKTMO ID: 38644412291
- Website: мобольшежировский.рф

Dolgy (Russian: Долгий) is a rural locality (a khutor) in Bolshezhirovsky Selsoviet Rural Settlement, Fatezhsky District, Kursk Oblast, Russia. Population: 8 (2010 census); 13 (2002 census);

== Geography ==
The khutor is located 94 km from the Russia–Ukraine border, 30 km north-west of Kursk, 16.5 km south of the district center – the town Fatezh, 7 km from the selsoviet center – Bolshoye Zhirovo.

Climate

Dolgy has a warm-summer humid continental climate (Dfb in the Köppen climate classification).

== Transport ==
Dolgy is located 7 km from the federal route M-2 Crimea Highway as part of the European route E105, 29 km from the road of regional importance 38K-018 (Kursk – Ponyri), 11 km from the road 38K-039 (Fatezh – 38K-018), 1 km from the road of intermunicipal significance 38H-221 (M2 "Crimea Highway" – Kromskaya), 29 km from the nearest railway halt Bukreyevka (railway line Oryol – Kursk).

The rural locality is situated 34.5 km from Kursk Vostochny Airport, 151 km from Belgorod International Airport and 231 km from Voronezh Peter the Great Airport.
