= Shablykino, Vladimir Oblast =

Shablykino Шаблыкино
- Village
- Location within Vladimir Oblast Location within Russia
- Coordinates: 56°21′N 38°32′E
- Country: Russia
- Region: Vladimir Oblast
- District: Alexandrovsky District
- Time zone: UTC+3:00

Shablykino (Russian: Шаблыкино) is a rural locality (a village) in Karinskoye Rural Settlement, Alexandrovsky District, Vladimir Oblast, Russia. The population was 75 as of 2010. There are 6 streets.

== Geography ==
Shablykino is located on the Peredyshka River, 17 km southwest of Alexandrov (the district's administrative centre) by road. Strunino is the nearest rural locality.
