= Grachyovka, Stavropol Krai =

Rural locality in Stavropol Krai, Russia

Coordinates: 45°12′12″N 42°23′47″E

Grachyovka (Russian: Грачѐвка) is a rural locality (a selo) and the administrative center of Grachyovsky District, Stavropol Krai, Russia. Population: 6,657 (2010 census); 6,238 (2002 census); 5,347 (1989 Soviet census).
