= Dolgoye, Arkhangelsk Oblast =

Dolgoye Долгое
- Village
- Location within Arkhangelsk Oblast Location within Russia
- Coordinates: 64°37′N 40°18′E
- Country: Russia
- Region: Arkhangelsk Oblast
- District: Primorsky District
- Time zone: UTC+3:00

Dolgoye (Russian: Долгое) is a rural locality (a village) in Ostrovnoye Rural Settlement of Primorsky District, Arkhangelsk Oblast, Russia. The population was 4 as of 2010.

== Geography ==
Dolgoye is located 32 km northwest of Arkhangelsk (the district's administrative centre) by road. Tinovatik is the nearest rural locality.
