= Khotynets, Khotynetsky District, Oryol Oblast =

Khotynets Хотынец
- Urban-type settlement
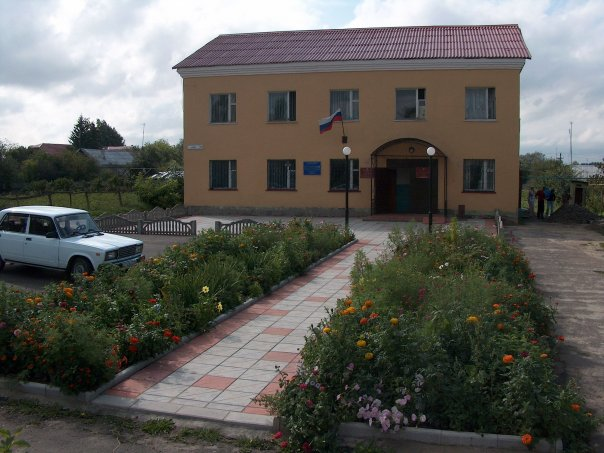
- Khotynets town hall
- Interactive map of Khotynets
- Location of Khotynets Khotynets (Oryol Oblast)
- Coordinates: 53.1261°N 35.3976°E
- Country: Russia
- Federal subject: Oryol Oblast
- Administrative district: Khotynetsky District
- Founded: 1745
- Elevation: 264 m (866 ft)

Population (2010 Census)
  - Total: 3,866
  - Estimate (2023): 3,514 (−9.1%)
- Time zone: UTC+3 (MSK)
- Postal code: 303930
- OKTMO ID: 54657151051

Khotynets (Russian: Хотыне́ц) is an urban locality (an urban-type settlement) in Khotynetsky District of Oryol Oblast, Russia. Population: 3,866 (2010 census); 4,238 (2002 census); 4,629 (1989 Soviet census).
