= Neruch =

- Native name: Неручь (Russian)

Location
- Country: Russia

Physical characteristics
- Mouth: Zusha
  - coordinates: 52.9667°N 36.9523°E
- Length: 111 km (69 mi)
- Basin size: 1,540 km^{2} (590 sq mi)

Basin features
- Progression: Zusha→ Oka→ Volga→ Caspian Sea

The Neruch (Russian: Неручь) is a river in Oryol Oblast in Russia, a left tributary of the Zusha. It is 111 kilometres (69 mi) long, and has a drainage basin of 1,540 square kilometres (590 sq mi).
