= Dolgy, Uryupinsky District, Volgograd Oblast =

Dolgy Долгий
- Khutor
- Location within Volgograd Oblast Location within Russia
- Coordinates: 50°38′N 42°18′E
- Country: Russia
- Region: Volgograd Oblast
- District: Uryupinsky District
- Time zone: UTC+4:00

Dolgy (Russian: Долгий) is a rural locality (a khutor) in Okladnenskoye Rural Settlement, Uryupinsky District, Volgograd Oblast, Russia. The population was 560 as of 2010. There are 8 streets.

== Geography ==
Dolgy is located in steppe, 36 km southeast of Uryupinsk (the district's administrative centre) by road. Zelyony is the nearest rural locality.
