= Naryshkino, Uritsky District, Oryol Oblast =

Naryshkino Нарышкино
- Urban-type settlement
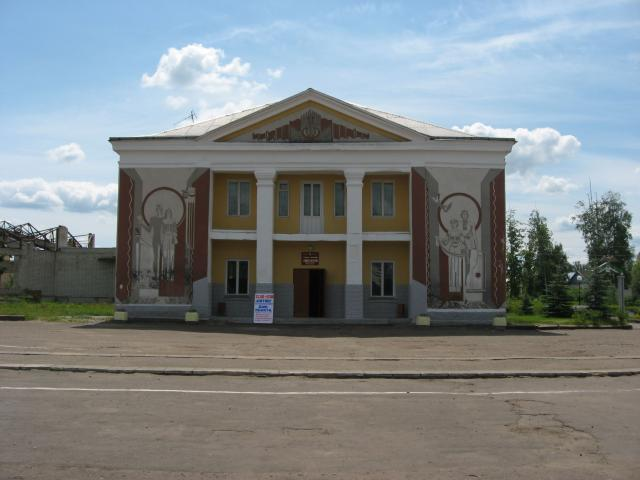
- House of culture in the Naryshkino

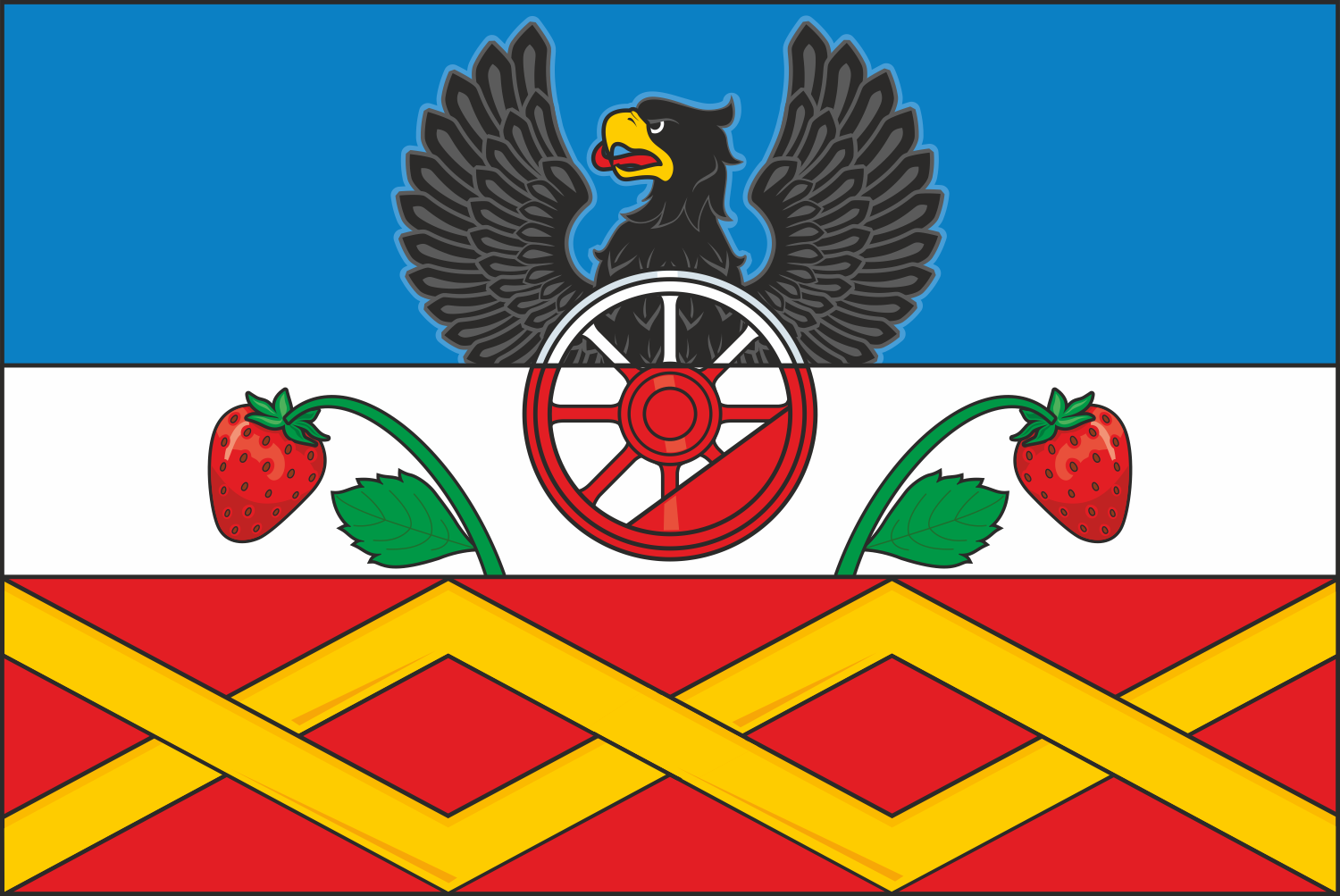
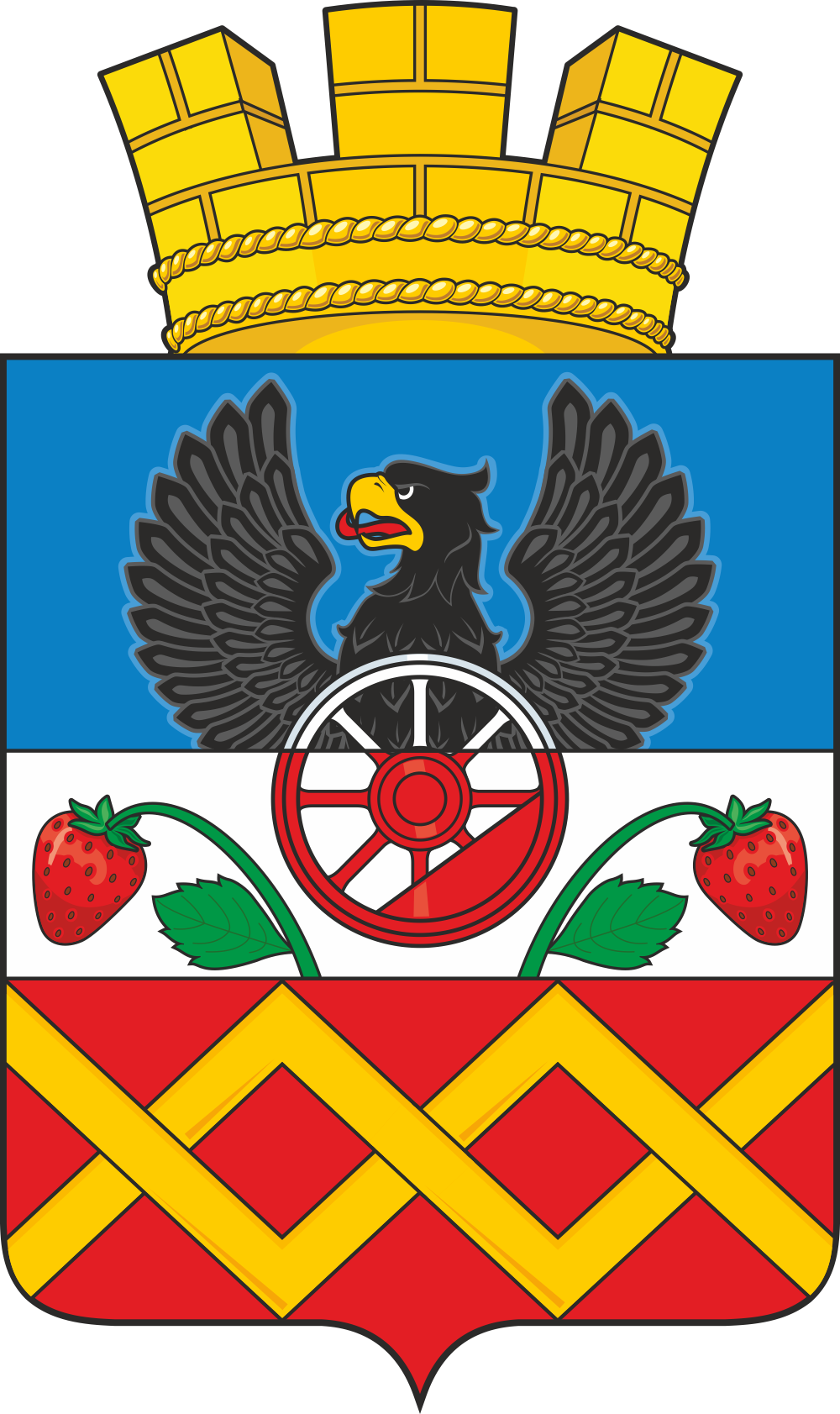
- Flag Coat of arms
- Interactive map of Naryshkino
- Location of Naryshkino Naryshkino (Oryol Oblast)
- Coordinates: 52.9676°N 35.7226°E
- Country: Russia
- Federal subject: Oryol Oblast
- Administrative district: Uritsky District
- Established: 1868
- Urban-type settlement status since: 1938

Area
  - Total: 16.65 km^{2} (6.43 sq mi)

Population (2010 Census)
  - Total: 9,584
  - Estimate (2023): 9,336 (−2.6%)
  - Density: 575.6/km^{2} (1,491/sq mi)
- Time zone: UTC+3 (MSK)
- Postal code: 303900
- Dialing code: +7 48647
- OKTMO ID: 54655151051

Naryshkino (Russian: Нарышкино) is an urban locality (an urban-type settlement) in Uritsky District of Oryol Oblast, Russia. Population: 9,584 (2010 census); 9,730 (2002 census); 8,785 (1989 Soviet census).

== Notable people ==
- Aleksandr Selikhov (1994) — Russian footballer
