= Verkhovye, Verkhovsky District, Oryol Oblast =

Verkhovye Верховье
- Urban-type settlement
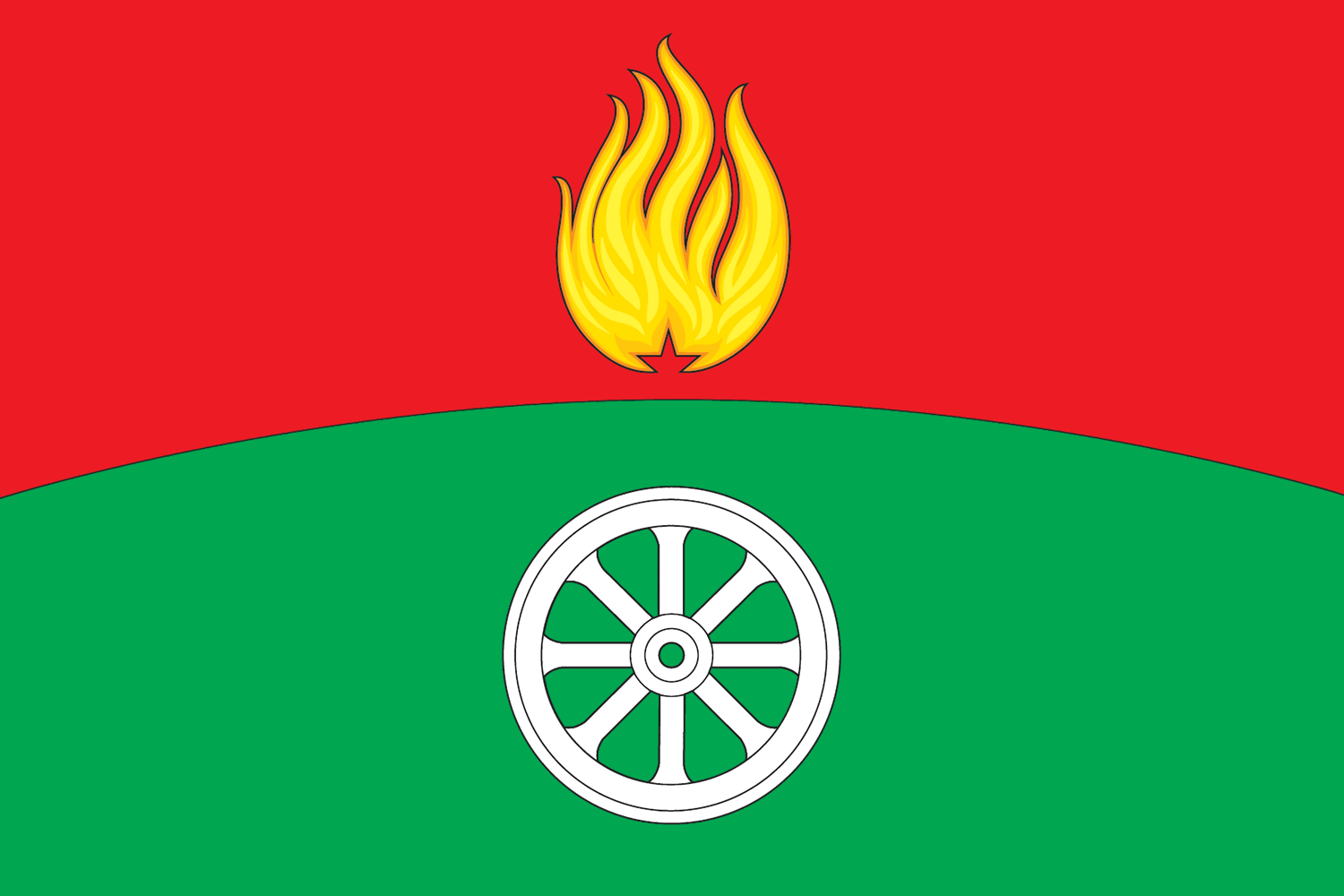
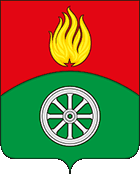
- Flag Coat of arms
- Interactive map of Verkhovye
- Location of Verkhovye Verkhovye (Oryol Oblast)
- Coordinates: 52.8100°N 37.2409°E
- Country: Russia
- Federal subject: Oryol Oblast
- Administrative district: Verkhovsky District

Population (2010 Census)
  - Total: 7,173
  - Estimate (2023): 7,053 (−1.7%)
- Time zone: UTC+3 (MSK)
- Postal code: 303720
- OKTMO ID: 54608151051

Verkhovye (Russian: Верховье) is an urban locality (an urban-type settlement) in Verkhovsky District of Oryol Oblast, Russia. Population: 7,173 (2010 census); 8,071 (2002 census); 8,983 (1989 Soviet census).
