= Mtsensk =

Town in Oryol Oblast, Russia

Mtsensk Мценск
- Town
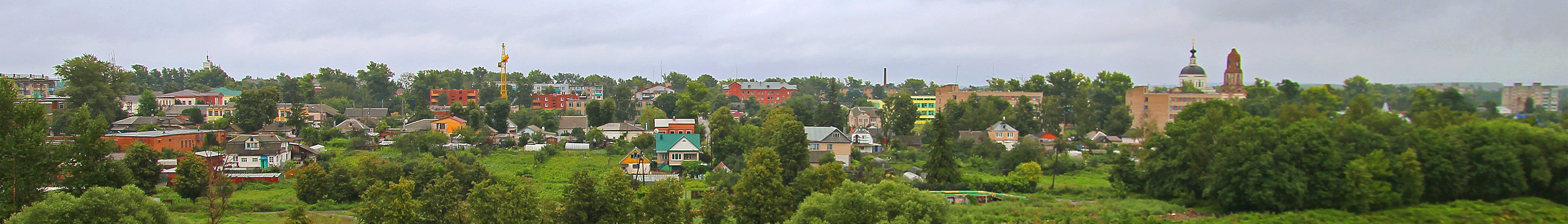
- View of Mtsensk

- Flag Coat of arms
- Interactive map of Mtsensk
- Location of Mtsensk Mtsensk (Oryol Oblast)
- Coordinates: 53°17′N 36°34′E
- Country: Russia
- Federal subject: Oryol Oblast
- First mentioned: 1146
- Town status since: 1778
- Elevation: 160 m (520 ft)

Population (2010 Census)
  - Total: 43,222
  - Estimate (2025): 35,116 (−18.8%)

Administrative status
  - Subordinated to: town of oblast significance of Mtsensk
  - Capital of: Mtsensky District, town of oblast significance of Mtsensk

Municipal status
  - Urban okrug: Mtsensk Urban Okrug
  - Capital of: Mtsensk Urban Okrug, Mtsensky Municipal District
- Time zone: UTC+3 (MSK)
- Postal codes: 303030–303032, 303035, 303036, 303039
- Dialing code: +7 48646
- OKTMO ID: 54710000001
- Website: www.adm-mtsensk.ru/index.html

Mtsensk (Russian: Мценск) is a town in Oryol Oblast, Russia, located on the Zusha River (a tributary of the Oka) 49 kilometers (30 mi) northeast of Oryol, the administrative center of the oblast. Population: 43,222 (2010 census); 47,807 (2002 census); 48,400 (1989 Soviet census); 28,000 (1970).

== History ==
Historical affiliations

Principality of Chernigov 1146–1320
Grand Duchy of Lithuania 1320–1505
Grand Duchy of Moscow 1505–1547
Tsardom of Russia 1547–1721
Russian Empire 1721–1917
Russian Republic 1917
Soviet Russia 1917–1922
Soviet Union 1922–1991
Russian Federation 1991–present

It was first mentioned in the Nikon Chronicle in 1146 as a part of the Principality of Chernigov. The name comes from the Mtsena River, a tributary of the Zusha, beside which a fortress stood. In 1238, Mtsensk was destroyed by Batu Khan. Since 1320, it was under the rule of Lithuania, eventually becoming a part of Muscovy in 1505. Since the beginning of the 19th century, Mtsensk rapidly developed as an industrial town.

During Operation Barbarossa, German armoured forces captured the town in the fall of 1941. In particular, troops of the 3rd Panzer Division, 4th Panzer Division, and Infantry Regiment Großdeutschland saw combat in the immediate vicinity. During the Battle of Kursk in 1943, Mtsensk served as the primary war zone. On 20 July 1943, Mtsensk was liberated by Soviet troops of the Bryansk Front.

== Administrative and municipal status ==
Within the framework of administrative divisions, Mtsensk serves as the administrative center of Mtsensky District, even though it is not a part of it. As an administrative division, it is incorporated separately as the town of oblast significance of Mtsensk—an administrative unit with the status equal to that of the districts. As a municipal division, the town of oblast significance of Mtsensk is incorporated as Mtsensk Urban Okrug.

== Twin towns – sister cities ==
Mtsensk is twinned with:

- Kubrat, Bulgaria

== See also ==
- Lady Macbeth of the Mtsensk District (disambiguation)
