= Livensky District =

Livensky District Ливенский район (Russian)
- District
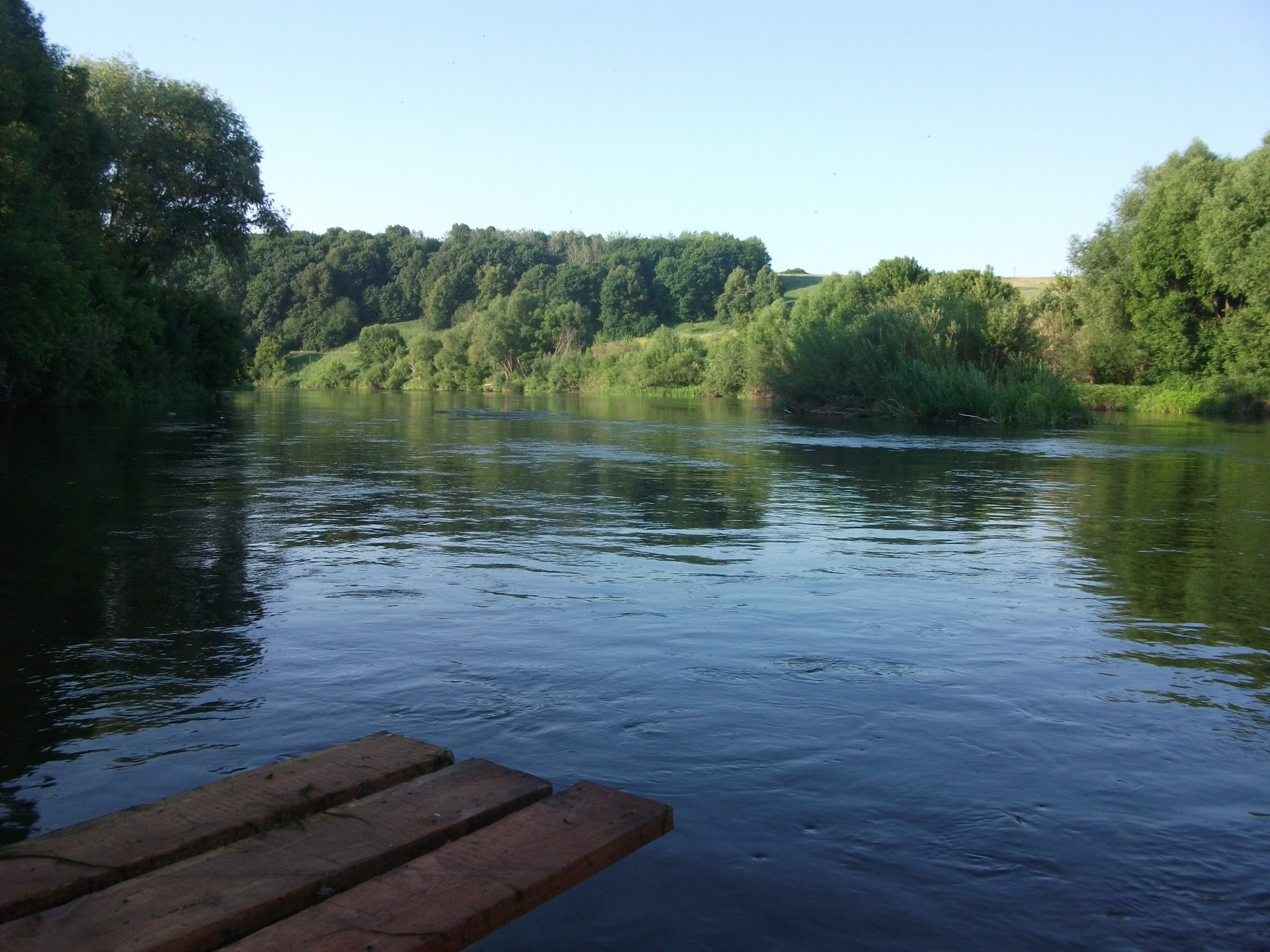
- River landscape, Livensky District

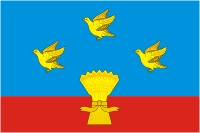
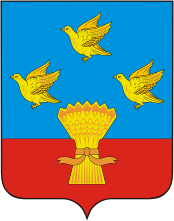
- Flag Coat of arms
- Location of Livensky District in Oryol Oblast
- Coordinates: 52°25′N 37°36′E
- Country: Russia
- Federal subject: Oryol Oblast
- Established: 30 July 1928
- Administrative center: Livny

Area
  - Total: 1,806.3 km^{2} (697.4 sq mi)

Population (2010 Census)
  - Total: 32,791
  - Density: 18.154/km^{2} (47.018/sq mi)
  - Urban: 0%
  - Rural: 100%

Administrative structure
  - Administrative divisions: 16 selsoviet
  - Inhabited localities: 145 rural localities

Municipal structure
  - Municipally incorporated as: Livensky Municipal District
  - Municipal divisions: 0 urban settlements, 16 rural settlements
- Time zone: UTC+3 (MSK)
- OKTMO ID: 54629000
- Website: http://adm-livr.ru/

Livensky District (Russian: Ли́венский райо́н) is an administrative and municipal district (raion), one of the twenty-four in Oryol Oblast, Russia. It is located in the southwest of the oblast. The area of the district is 1,806.3 square kilometers (697.4 sq mi). Its administrative center is the town of Livny (which is not administratively a part of the district). Population: 32,791 (2010 Census); 34,200 (2002 census); 34,503 (1989 Soviet census).

== Administrative and municipal status ==
Within the framework of administrative divisions, Livensky District is one of the twenty-four in the oblast. The town of Livny serves as its administrative center, despite being incorporated separately as a town of oblast significance—an administrative unit with the status equal to that of the districts.

As a municipal division, the district is incorporated as Livensky Municipal District. The town of oblast significance of Livny is incorporated separately from the district as Livny Urban Okrug.

== Notable people ==
- Nikolai Nikolaevich Polikarpov (1892–1944), Soviet and Russian aeronautical engineer and aircraft designer
- Alexey Stakhanov (1906–1977), Soviet and Russian miner of Donets basin, propaganda celebrity of Stakhanovite movement
