= Grachyovka, Republic of Bashkortostan =

Grachyovka Грачёвка
- Village
- Location within Bashkortostan Location within Russia
- Coordinates: 54°24′N 55°58′E
- Country: Russia
- Region: Bashkortostan
- District: Karmaskalinsky District
- Time zone: UTC+5:00

Grachyovka (Russian: Грачёвка) is a rural locality (a village) in Shaymuratovsky Selsoviet, Karmaskalinsky District, Bashkortostan, Russia. The population was 70 as of 2010. There are 2 streets.

== Geography ==
Grachyovka is located 29 km northwest of Karmaskaly (the district's administrative centre) by road. Novoandreyevka is the nearest rural locality.
