= Dolgy, Leninsky District, Volgograd Oblast =

Dolgy Долгий
- Khutor
- Location within Volgograd Oblast Location within Russia
- Coordinates: 48°31′N 45°06′E
- Country: Russia
- Region: Volgograd Oblast
- District: Leninsky District
- Time zone: UTC+4:00

Dolgy (Russian: Долгий) is a rural locality (a khutor) in Pokrovskoye Rural Settlement, Leninsky District, Volgograd Oblast, Russia. The population was 24 as of 2010. There are 2 streets.

== Geography ==
The village is located on Caspian Depression, on the left bank of the Kalinov, 76 km from Volgograd, 27 km from Leninsk, 16 km from Pokrovka.
