= Kolpna =

Kolpna Колпна
- Urban-type settlement
- Interactive map of Kolpna
- Location of Kolpna Kolpna (Oryol Oblast)
- Coordinates: 52.2224°N 37.0314°E
- Country: Russia
- Federal subject: Oryol Oblast
- Administrative district: Kolpnyansky District

Population (2010 Census)
  - Total: 6,614
  - Estimate (2023): 5,296 (−19.9%)
- Time zone: UTC+3 (MSK)
- Postal code: 303410
- OKTMO ID: 54623151051

Kolpna (Russian: Колпна́), until 1 January 2006 as Kolpny (Russian: Ко́лпны), is an urban locality (an urban-type settlement) in Kolpnyansky District of Oryol Oblast, Russia. Population: 6,614 (2010 census); 7,177 (2002 census); 7,635 (1989 Soviet census).
