= Grachyovsky District, Stavropol Krai =

Grachyovsky District Грачёвский район (Russian)
- District
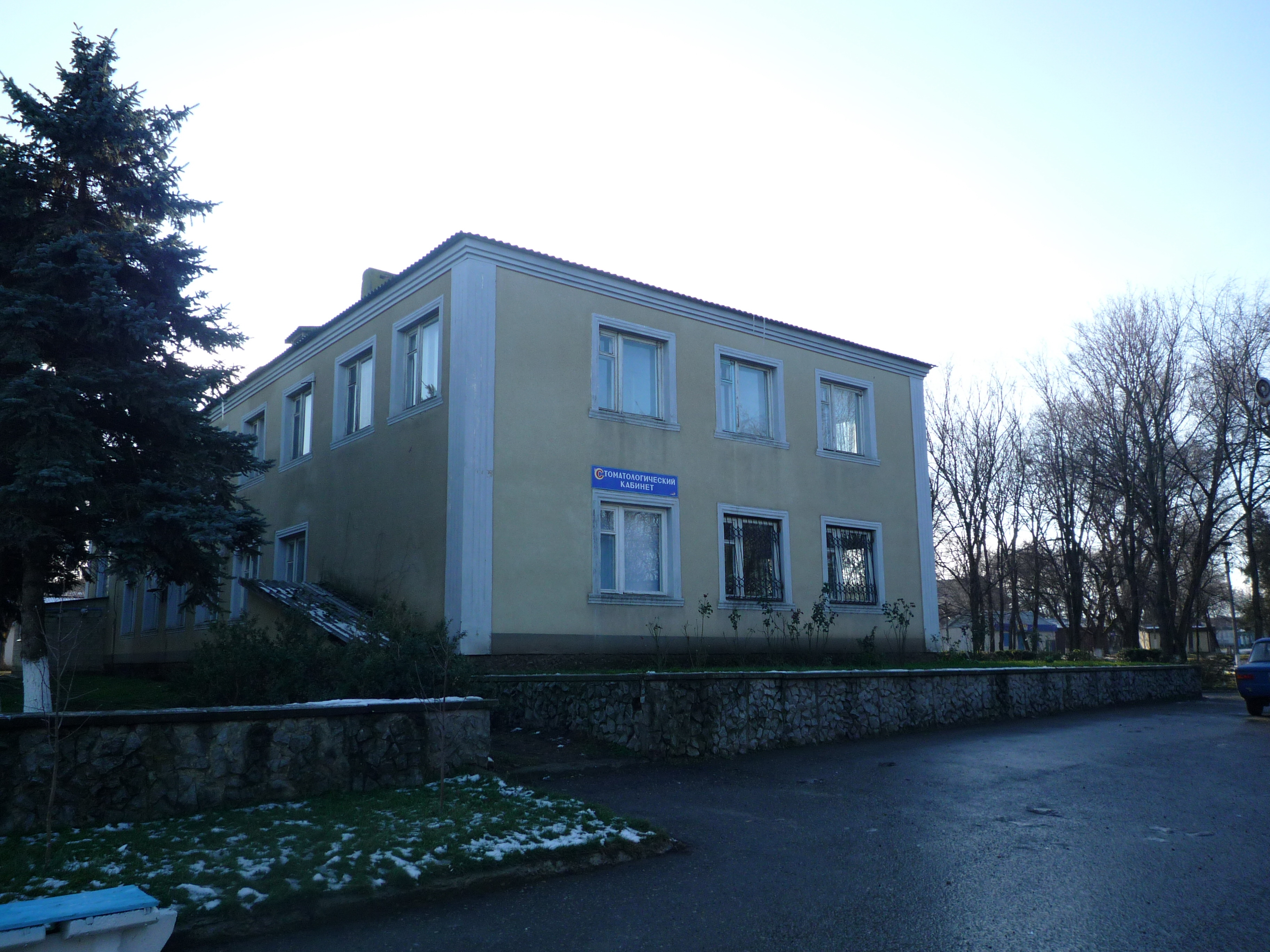
- Selsoviet building in the selo of Kugulta, Grachyovsky District

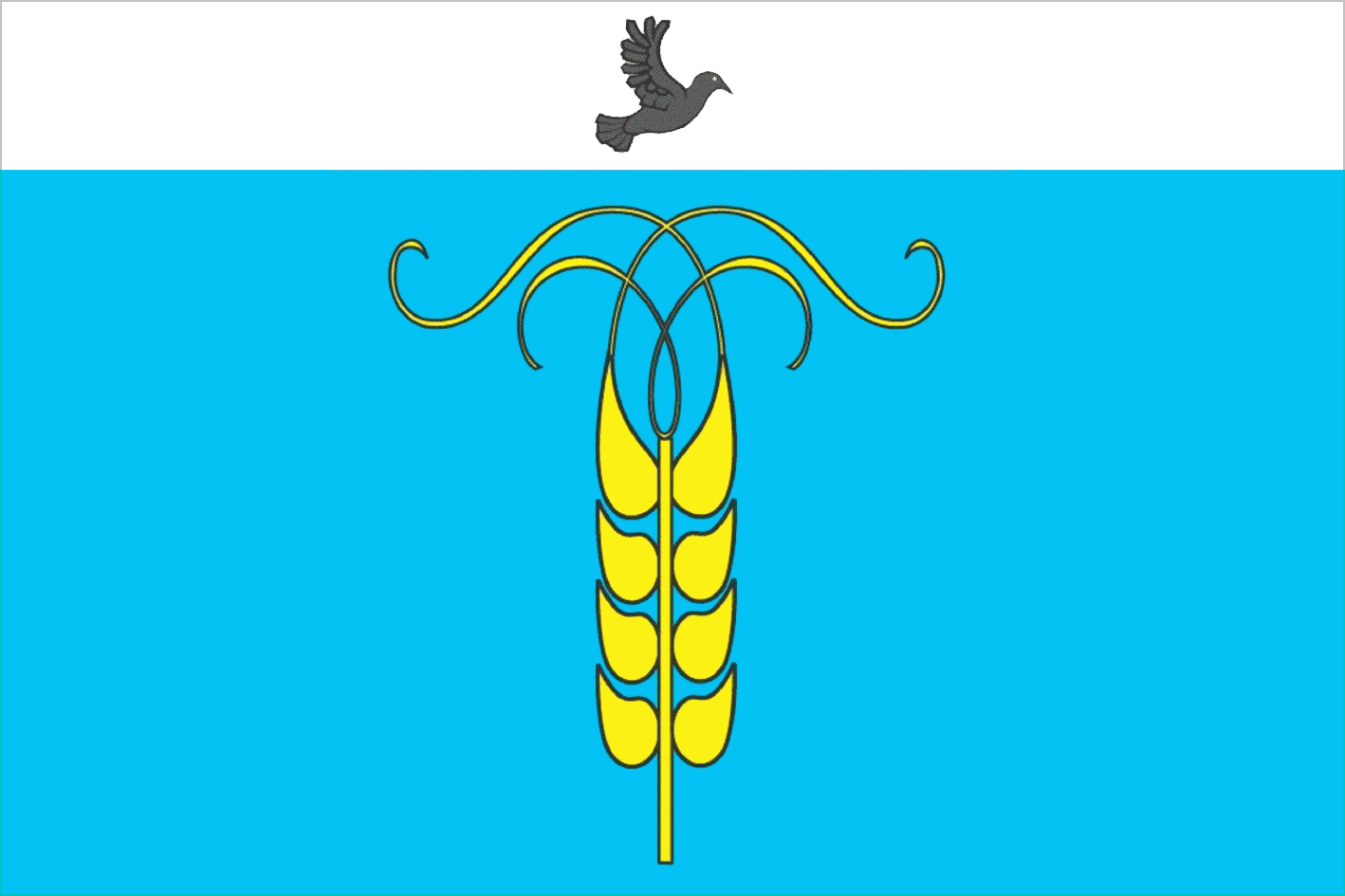
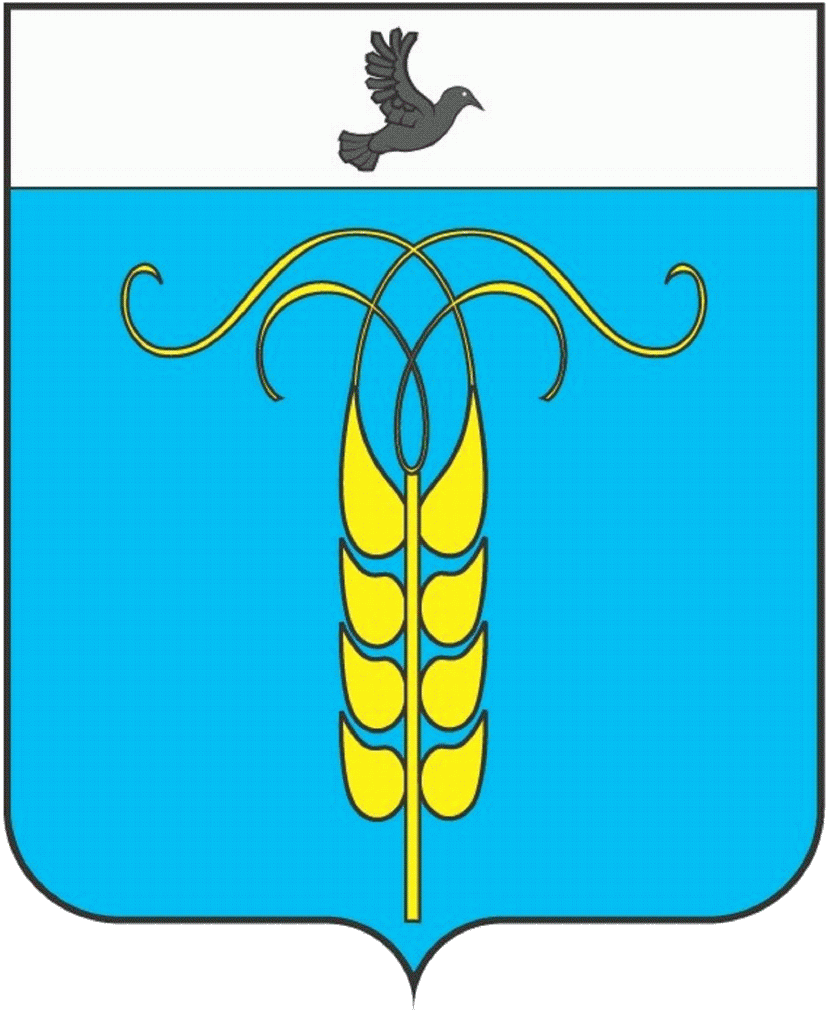
- Flag Coat of arms
- Location of Grachyovsky District in Stavropol Krai
- Coordinates: 45°12′N 42°24′E
- Country: Russia
- Federal subject: Stavropol Krai
- Established: 1970
- Administrative center: Grachyovka

Area
  - Total: 1,794 km^{2} (693 sq mi)

Population (2010 Census)
  - Total: 36,272
  - Density: 20.22/km^{2} (52.37/sq mi)
  - Urban: 0%
  - Rural: 100%

Administrative structure
  - Administrative divisions: 6 selsoviet
  - Inhabited localities: 16 rural localities

Municipal structure
  - Municipally incorporated as: Grachyovsky Municipal District
  - Municipal divisions: 0 urban settlements, 8 rural settlements
- Time zone: UTC+3 (MSK)
- OKTMO ID: 07617000
- Website: http://www.adm-grsk.ru

Grachyovsky District (Russian: Грачёвский райо́н) is an administrative district (raion), one of the twenty-six in Stavropol Krai, Russia. Municipally, it is incorporated as Grachyovsky Municipal District. It is located in the western central part of the krai. The area of the district is 1,794 square kilometers (693 sq mi). Its administrative center is the rural locality (a selo) of Grachyovka. Population: 36,272 (2010 census); 36,110 (2002 Census); 31,970 (1989 Census). The population of Grachyovka accounts for 18.4% of the district's total population.
