= State Heraldic Register of the Russian Federation =

Russian federal strategy

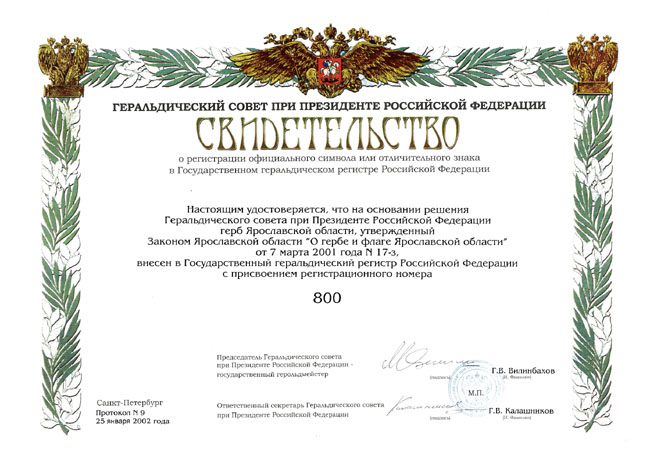
Sample Certificate of entry in the State Heraldic Register of the Russian Federation; on the example of the coat of arms of the Yaroslavl region (No. 800)

The State Heraldic Register of the Russian Federation is a list of descriptions and images of symbols that have received official approval in the Russian Federation, created "in order to systematize and organize the use of official symbols and distinctive signs". Maintaining the register is assigned to the Heraldic Council of the President of the Russian Federation.

The State Heraldic Register was established in accordance with the Decree of President Boris Yeltsin No. 403 of March 21, 1996.

According to the Regulation on the Heraldic Register, the following are entered in it:

- official symbols of the Russian Federation and constituent entities of the Russian Federation (flags, coats of arms);
- official symbols of federal government bodies and state authorities of constituent entities of the Russian Federation (flags, coats of arms, emblems);
- official symbols of local self-government bodies and other municipalities (flags, coats of arms, emblems);
- insignia, awards of federal executive bodies and executive bodies of constituent entities of the Russian Federation.

All official symbols in the Register receive a registration number, which is not changed in the future. The right to an official symbol and distinctive sign entered in the register belongs to the holder of the certificate of registration of the official symbol and distinctive sign or its legal successor.

On October 13, 2003, President Vladimir Putin issued Decree No. 471-rp "On the procedure for Issuing Certificates of Registration of Official Symbols and Distinctive Signs in the State Heraldic Register of the Russian Federation". According to this document, the certificate of registration in the State Heraldic Register "is drawn up on a standard letterhead", "is made on special paper", may contain "a multi-color drawing of the heraldic sign", "is sealed with the signatures of the chairman and executive secretary of the Heraldic Council and the stamp". The certificate shall indicate the serial number under which the official symbol or distinctive sign is entered in the State Heraldic Register of the Russian Federation, the date and number of the minutes of the meeting.The Heraldic Council under the President of the Russian Federation that made the decision to register the heraldic sign.

== See also ==
- List of subjects in the State Heraldic Register of the Russian Federation
