= Dolgoye, Dolzhansky District, Oryol Oblast =

Dolgoye Долгое
- Urban-type settlement
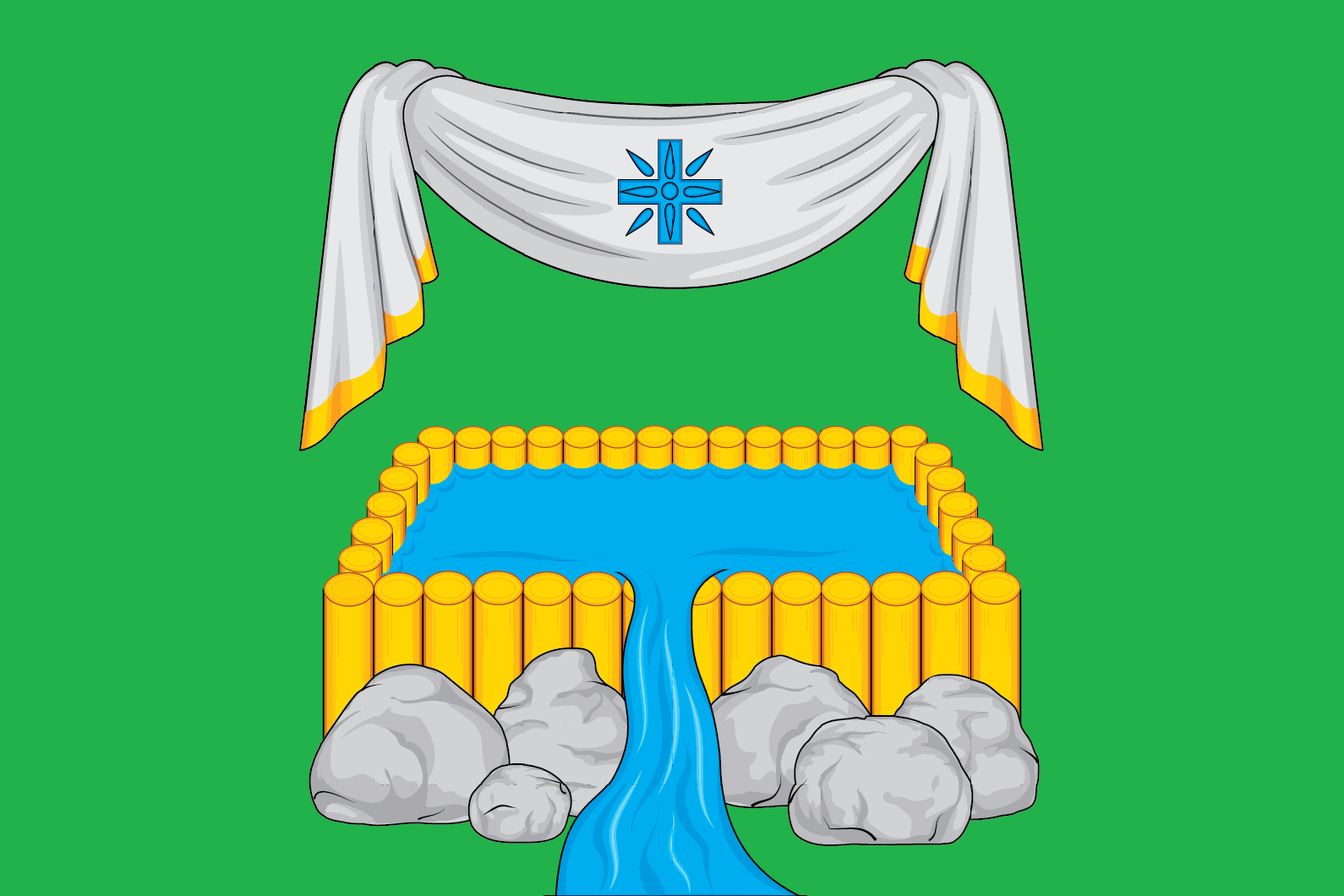
- Flag
- Interactive map of Dolgoye
- Location of Dolgoye Dolgoye (Oryol Oblast)
- Coordinates: 52.0550°N 37.5295°E
- Country: Russia
- Federal subject: Oryol Oblast
- Administrative district: Dolzhansky District
- Elevation: 200 m (660 ft)

Population (2010 Census)
  - Total: 4,443
  - Estimate (2023): 3,508 (−21%)
- Time zone: UTC+3 (MSK)
- Postal codes: 303750, 303761, 303765, 303770
- OKTMO ID: 54615151051

Dolgoye (Russian: Долгое) is an urban locality (an urban-type settlement) in Dolzhansky District of Oryol Oblast, Russia. Population: 4,443 (2010 census); 5,020 (2002 census); 4,330 (1989 Soviet census).
