= Glazunovka, Oryol Oblast =

Glazunovka Глазуновка
- Urban-type settlement
- Interactive map of Glazunovka
- Location of Glazunovka Glazunovka (Oryol Oblast)
- Coordinates: 52.4995°N 36.3226°E
- Country: Russia
- Federal subject: Oryol Oblast
- Administrative district: Glazunovsky District

Population (2010 Census)
  - Total: 5,939
  - Estimate (2023): 4,692 (−21%)
- Time zone: UTC+3 (MSK)
- Postal code: 303340
- OKTMO ID: 54610151051

Glazunovka (Russian: Глазуновка) is an urban locality (an urban-type settlement) in Glazunovsky District of Oryol Oblast, Russia. Population: 5,939 (2010 census); 6,756 (2002 census); 7,025 (1989 Soviet census).
