= Heraldic Council of the President of the Russian Federation =

Heraldic advisory body

The Heraldic Council of the President of the Russian Federation (translated various ways), Russian: Геральдический совет при Президенте Российской Федерации, is a part of the Russian Presidential Executive Office. It advises the president, and hence the Russian state, on heraldic matters.

The council was founded in 1992 and is headed by the Master Herald. Its duties includes the overseeing of the use of official symbols, and preventing their use by non-authorised sources. It helps local and regional governments devise coats of arms. It also discusses matters, and researches heraldry in Russia. It runs, and has authority over, the State Heraldic Register of the Russian Federation.
