= Zmiyovka, Oryol Oblast =

Zmiyovka Змиёвка
- Urban-type settlement
- Interactive map of Zmiyovka
- Location of Zmiyovka Zmiyovka (Oryol Oblast)
- Coordinates: 52.6723°N 36.3807°E
- Country: Russia
- Federal subject: Oryol Oblast
- Administrative district: Sverdlovsky District

Population (2010 Census)
  - Total: 5,976
  - Estimate (2023): 4,919 (−17.7%)
- Time zone: UTC+3 (MSK)
- Postal code: 303320
- OKTMO ID: 54652151051

Zmiyovka (Russian: Змиёвка) is an urban locality (an urban-type settlement) in Sverdlovsky District of Oryol Oblast, Russia. Population: 5,976 (2010 census); 6,373 (2002 census); 6,295 (1989 Soviet census).
