= Shablykino, Oryol Oblast =

Shablykino Шаблыкино
- Urban-type settlement
- Interactive map of Shablykino
- Location of Shablykino Shablykino (Oryol Oblast)
- Coordinates: 52.8543°N 35.1955°E
- Country: Russia
- Federal subject: Oryol Oblast
- Administrative district: Shablykinsky District

Population (2010 Census)
  - Total: 3,414
  - Estimate (2023): 2,804 (−17.9%)
- Time zone: UTC+3 (MSK)
- Postal code: 303260
- OKTMO ID: 54659151051

Shablykino (Russian: Шаблы́кино) is an urban locality (an urban-type settlement) in Shablykinsky District of Oryol Oblast, Russia. Population: 3,414 (2010 census); 3,900 (2002 census); 4,143 (1989 Soviet census).
