= Glazunovsky District =

Glazunovsky District Глазуновский район
- District
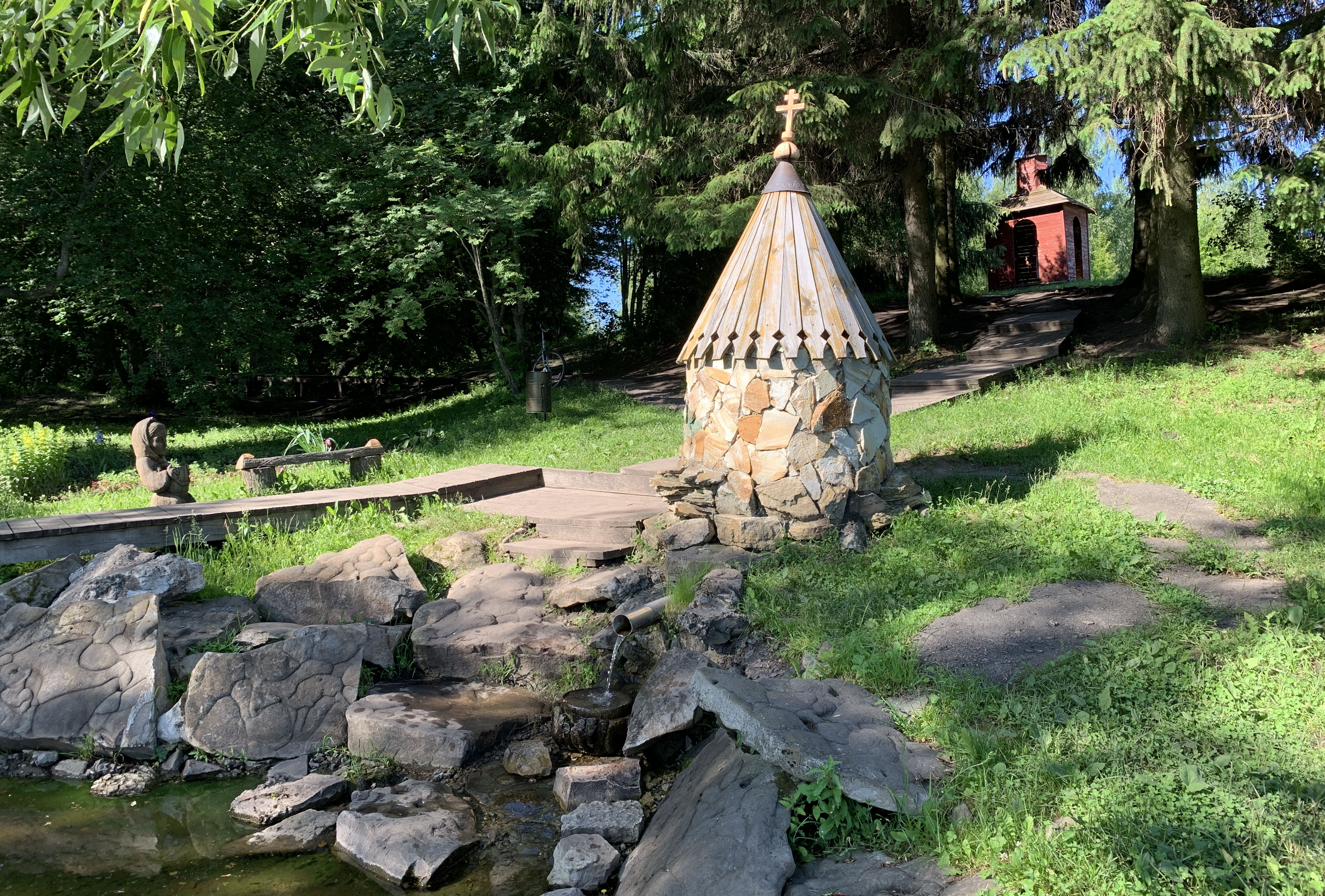

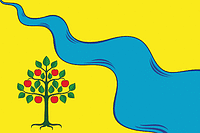
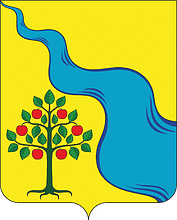
- Flag Coat of arms
- Location of Glazunovsky District in Oryol Oblast
- Coordinates: 52°29′55″N 36°19′39″E
- Country: Russia
- Federal subject: Oryol Oblast
- Administrative center: Glazunovka

Area
  - Total: 580.9 km^{2} (224.3 sq mi)

Population (2010 Census)
  - Total: 13,162
  - Density: 22.66/km^{2} (58.68/sq mi)
  - Urban: 45.1%
  - Rural: 54.9%

Administrative structure
  - Administrative divisions: 1 Urban-type settlements, 7 Selsoviets
  - Inhabited localities: 1 urban-type settlements, 62 rural localities

Municipal structure
  - Municipally incorporated as: Glazunovsky Municipal District
  - Municipal divisions: 1 urban settlements, 7 rural settlements
- Time zone: UTC+3 (MSK)
- OKTMO ID: 54610000
- Website: http://www.adminglazun.ru/

Glazunovsky District (Russian: Глазуновский райо́н) is an administrative and municipal district (raion), one of the twenty-four in Oryol Oblast, Russia. It is located in the south of the oblast. The area of the district is 580.9 square kilometers (224.3 sq mi). Its administrative center is the urban locality (an urban-type settlement) of Glazunovka. Population: 13,162 (2010 Census); 14,976 (2002 Census); 16,651 (1989 Soviet census). The population of Glazunovka accounts for 45.1% of the district's total population.
