= Shablykinsky District =

Shablykinsky District Шаблыкинский район (Russian)
- District
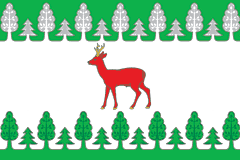
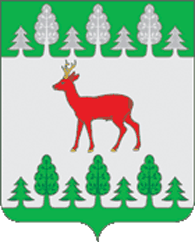
- Flag Coat of arms
- Location of Shablykinsky District in Oryol Oblast
- Coordinates: 52°51′15″N 35°11′50″E
- Country: Russia
- Federal subject: Oryol Oblast
- Established: 17 June 1929
- Administrative center: Shablykino

Area
  - Total: 847.5 km^{2} (327.2 sq mi)

Population (2010 Census)
  - Total: 8,045
  - Density: 9.493/km^{2} (24.59/sq mi)
  - Urban: 42.4%
  - Rural: 57.6%

Administrative structure
  - Administrative divisions: 1 Urban-type settlements, 7 Selsoviets
  - Inhabited localities: 1 urban-type settlements, 63 rural localities

Municipal structure
  - Municipally incorporated as: Shablykinsky Municipal District
  - Municipal divisions: 1 urban settlements, 7 rural settlements
- Time zone: UTC+3 (MSK)
- OKTMO ID: 54659000
- Website: http://adminshabl.57ru.ru/

Shablykinsky District (Russian: Шаблыкинский райо́н) is an administrative and municipal district (raion), one of the twenty-four in Oryol Oblast, Russia. It is located in the west of the oblast. The area of the district is 847.5 square kilometers (327.2 sq mi). Its administrative center is the urban locality (an urban-type settlement) of Shablykino. Population: 8,045 (2010 Census); 9,588 (2002 Census); 10,644 (1989 Soviet census). The population of Shablykino accounts for 42.4% of the district's total population.

== Notable residents ==
- Nikolay Mikhaylovich Volkov, politician, born 1951 in the village of Krasnoye
