= Verkhovsky District =

Verkhovsky District Верховский район (Russian)
- District
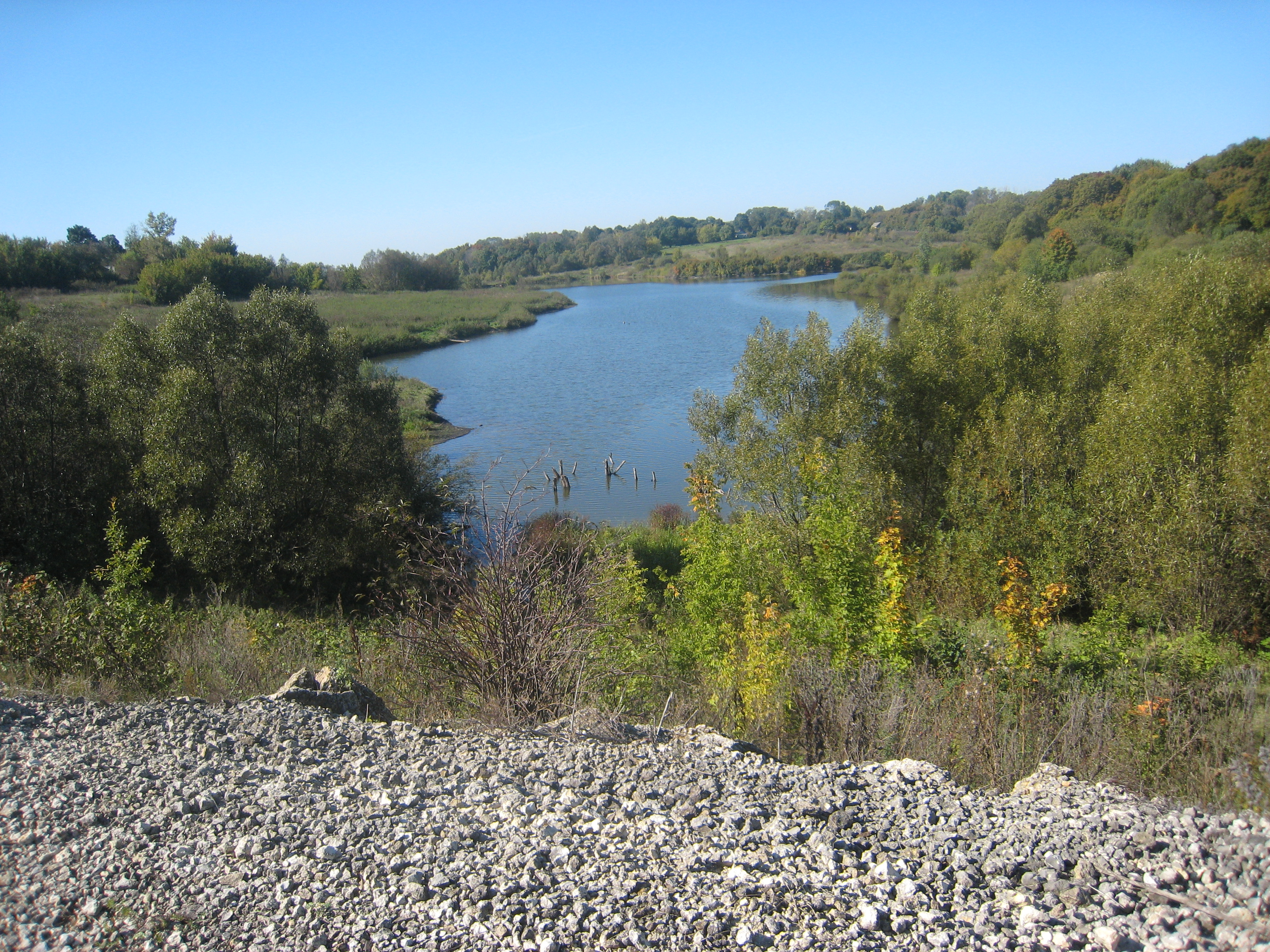
- Pond in village Skoryatino, Verkhovsky District

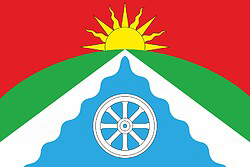
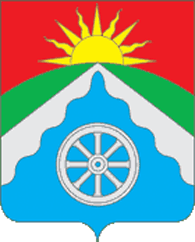
- Flag Coat of arms
- Location of Verkhovsky District in Oryol Oblast
- Coordinates: 52°48′52″N 37°14′01″E
- Country: Russia
- Federal subject: Oryol Oblast
- Administrative center: Verkhovye

Area
  - Total: 1,072.4 km^{2} (414.1 sq mi)

Population (2010 Census)
  - Total: 17,283
  - Density: 16.116/km^{2} (41.741/sq mi)
  - Urban: 41.5%
  - Rural: 58.5%

Administrative structure
  - Administrative divisions: 1 Urban-type settlements, 10 Selsoviets
  - Inhabited localities: 1 urban-type settlements, 130 rural localities

Municipal structure
  - Municipally incorporated as: Verkhovsky Municipal District
  - Municipal divisions: 1 urban settlements, 10 rural settlements
- Time zone: UTC+3 (MSK)
- OKTMO ID: 54608000
- Website: http://adminverhov.ru/

Verkhovsky District (Russian: Верховский райо́н) is an administrative and municipal district (raion), one of the twenty-four in Oryol Oblast, Russia. It is located in the east of the oblast. The area of the district is 1,072.4 square kilometers (414.1 sq mi). Its administrative center is the urban locality (an urban-type settlement) of Verkhovye. Population: 17,283 (2010 Census); 21,384 (2002 census); 24,888 (1989 Soviet census). The population of Verkhovye accounts for 41.5% of the district's total population.
