= Uritsky District =

Uritsky District Урицкий район (Russian)
- District
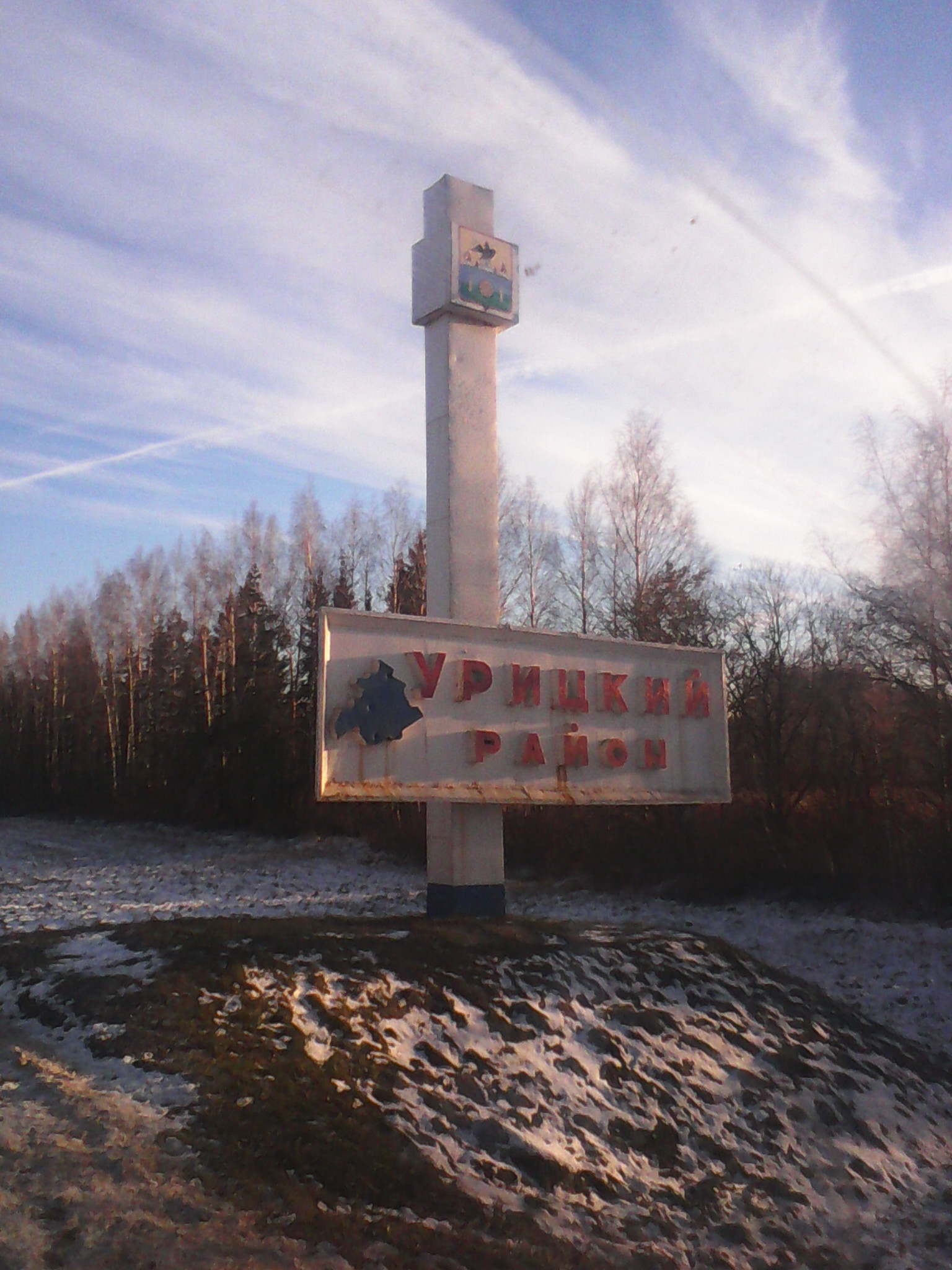
- Entrance to Uritsky District

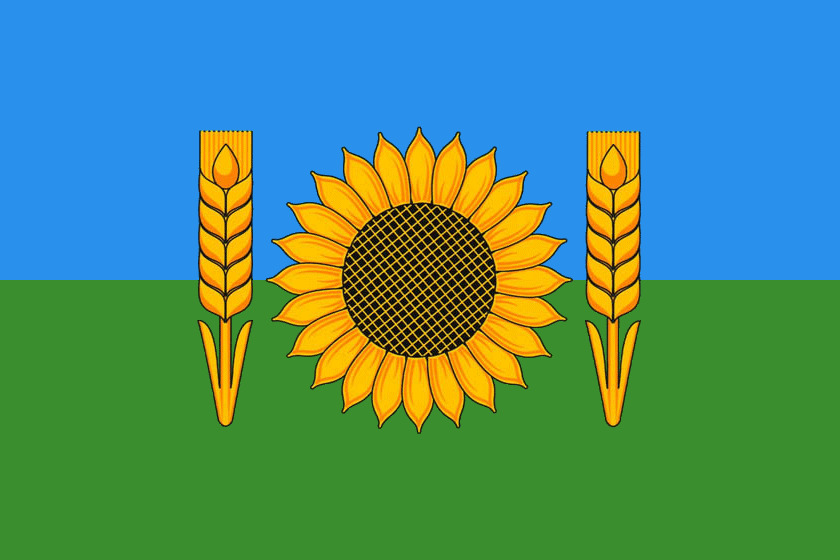
- Flag
- Location of Uritsky District in Oryol Oblast
- Coordinates: 52°58′09″N 35°43′37″E
- Country: Russia
- Federal subject: Oryol Oblast
- Administrative center: Naryshkino

Area
  - Total: 838.4 km^{2} (323.7 sq mi)

Population (2010 Census)
  - Total: 18,666
  - Density: 22.26/km^{2} (57.66/sq mi)
  - Urban: 51.3%
  - Rural: 48.7%

Administrative structure
  - Administrative divisions: 1 Urban-type settlements, 7 Selsoviets
  - Inhabited localities: 1 urban-type settlements, 152 rural localities

Municipal structure
  - Municipally incorporated as: Uritsky Municipal District
  - Municipal divisions: 1 urban settlements, 7 rural settlements
- Time zone: UTC+3 (MSK)
- OKTMO ID: 54655000
- Website: http://www.urickiy.ru/

Uritsky District (Russian: Урицкий райо́н) is an administrative and municipal district (raion), one of the twenty-four in Oryol Oblast, Russia. It is located in the west of the oblast. The area of the district is 838.4 square kilometers (323.7 sq mi). Its administrative center is the urban locality (an urban-type settlement) of Naryshkino. Population: 18,666 (2010 Census); 20,224 (2002 census); 19,082 (1989 Soviet census). The population of Naryshkino accounts for 51.3% of the district's total population.
