= Dolzhansky District =

Dolzhansky District Должанский район (Russian)
- District
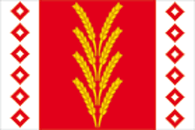
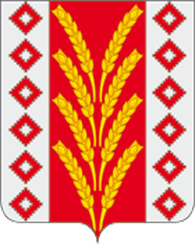
- Flag Coat of arms
- Location of Dolzhansky District in Oryol Oblast
- Coordinates: 52°03′30″N 37°31′28″E
- Country: Russia
- Federal subject: Oryol Oblast
- Established: 30 July 1928
- Administrative center: Dolgoye

Area
  - Total: 908.4 km^{2} (350.7 sq mi)

Population (2010 Census)
  - Total: 11,984
  - Density: 13.19/km^{2} (34.17/sq mi)
  - Urban: 37.1%
  - Rural: 62.9%

Administrative structure
  - Administrative divisions: 1 Urban-type settlements, 7 Selsoviets
  - Inhabited localities: 1 urban-type settlements, 78 rural localities

Municipal structure
  - Municipally incorporated as: Dolzhansky Municipal District
  - Municipal divisions: 1 urban settlements, 7 rural settlements
- Time zone: UTC+3 (MSK)
- OKTMO ID: 54615000
- Website: http://admindolgan.ru/

Dolzhansky District (Russian: Должа́нский райо́н) is an administrative and municipal district (raion), one of the twenty-four in Oryol Oblast, Russia. It is located in the southeast of the oblast. The area of the district is 908.4 square kilometers (350.7 sq mi). Its administrative center is the urban locality (an urban-type settlement) of Dolgoye. Population: 11,984 (2010 Census); 14,187 (2002 census); 15,364 (1989 Soviet census). The population of Dolgoye accounts for 37.1% of the district's total population.

== Attractions ==
- Sports and recreation complex (FOC)
- Convent of St. Mary Magdalene

== Notable residents ==
- Ivan Ilyich Dolgikh (1904–1961), Soviet police officer and politician, head of the Gulag labour camps 1951–1954
- Anatoly Yakunin (born 1964), Moscow Police Commissioner 2012–2016, born in the village of Krivtsovo-Plota
