= Sverdlovsky District, Oryol Oblast =

Sverdlovsky District Свердловский район (Russian)
- District
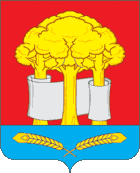
- Flag Coat of arms
- Location of Sverdlovsky District in Oryol Oblast
- Coordinates: 52°40′11″N 36°22′26″E
- Country: Russia
- Federal subject: Oryol Oblast
- Established: 30 July 1928
- Administrative center: Zmiyovka

Area
  - Total: 1,061.46 km^{2} (409.83 sq mi)

Population (2010 Census)
  - Total: 16,311
  - Estimate (2016): 15,354
  - Density: 15.367/km^{2} (39.799/sq mi)
  - Urban: 36.6%
  - Rural: 64.4%

Administrative structure
  - Administrative divisions: 1 Urban-type settlements, 7 Selsoviets
  - Inhabited localities: 1 urban-type settlements, 111 rural localities

Municipal structure
  - Municipally incorporated as: Sverdlovsky Municipal District
  - Municipal divisions: 1 urban settlements, 7 rural settlements
- Time zone: UTC+3 (MSK)
- OKTMO ID: 54652000
- Website: http://www.zmievka.info/

Sverdlovsky District (Russian: Свердло́вский райо́н) is an administrative and municipal district (raion), one of the twenty-four in Oryol Oblast, Russia. It is located in the center of the oblast. The area of the district is 1,061.4 square kilometers (409.8 sq mi). Its administrative center is the urban locality (an urban-type settlement) of Zmiyovka. Population: 16,311 (2010 Census); 18,070 (2002 Census); 19,223 (1989 Soviet census). The population of Zmiyovka accounts for 36.6% of the district's total population.

== Notable residents ==
- Nikolai Leskov (1831–1895), writer, born in Gorokhovo
- Aleksey Zhadov (1901–1977), Red Army officer, born in the village of Nikolskoye
