= Orlovsky District, Oryol Oblast =

Orlovsky District Орловский район (Russian)
- District
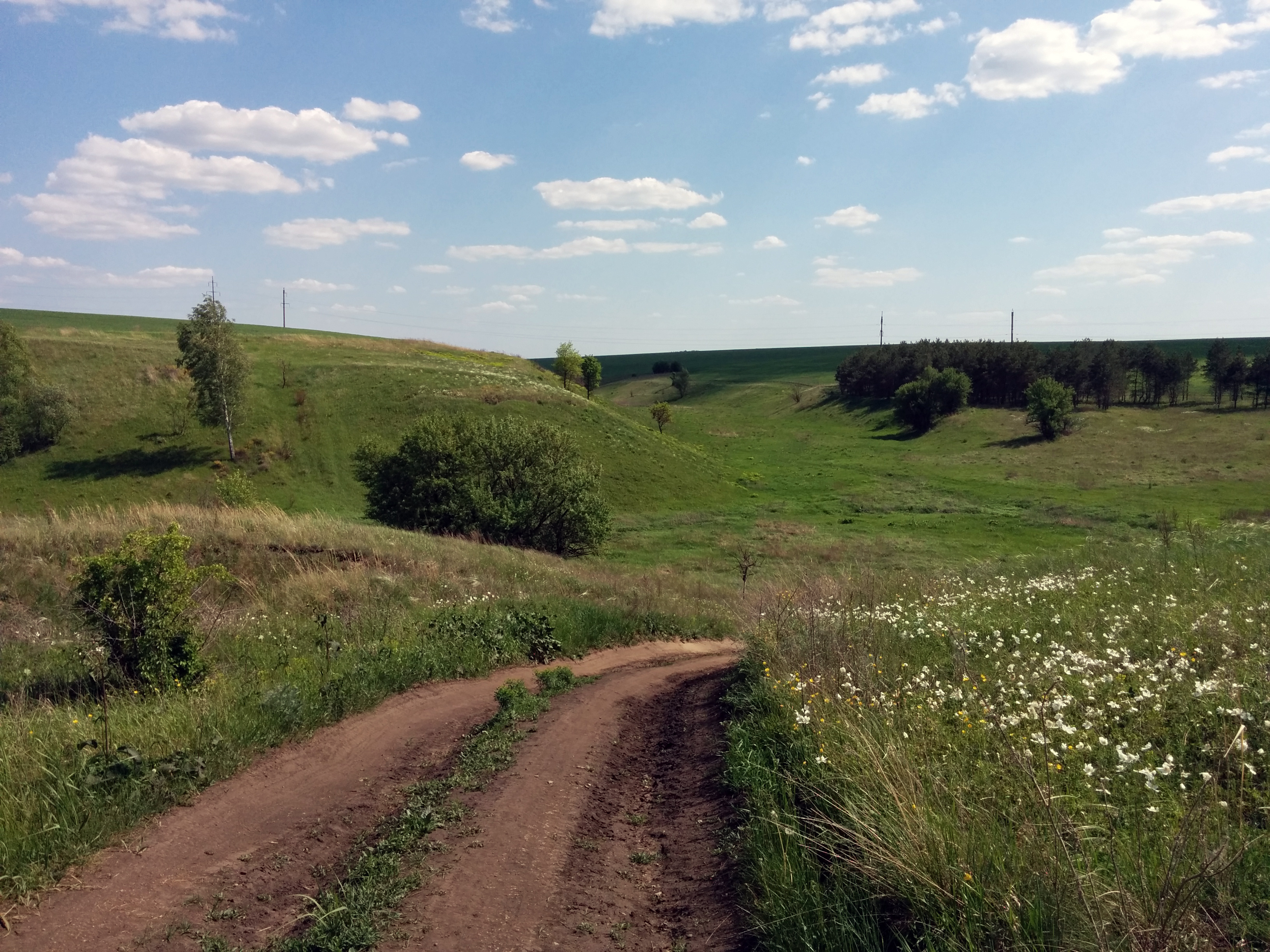
- Neprets Gulch, Orlovsky District

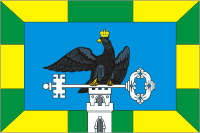
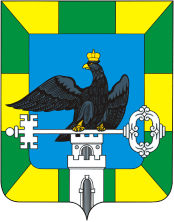
- Flag Coat of arms
- Location of Orlovsky District in Oryol Oblast
- Coordinates: 52°58′N 36°05′E
- Country: Russia
- Federal subject: Oryol Oblast
- Established: 30 July 1928
- Administrative center: Oryol

Area
  - Total: 1,701.4 km^{2} (656.9 sq mi)

Population (2010 Census)
  - Total: 67,384
  - Density: 39.605/km^{2} (102.58/sq mi)
  - Urban: 17.8%
  - Rural: 82.2%

Administrative structure
  - Administrative divisions: 1 Urban-type settlements, 16 Selsoviets
  - Inhabited localities: 1 urban-type settlements, 264 rural localities

Municipal structure
  - Municipally incorporated as: Orlovsky Municipal District
  - Municipal divisions: 1 urban settlements, 16 rural settlements
- Time zone: UTC+3 (MSK)
- OKTMO ID: 54501000
- Website: http://orlr.ru/

Orlovsky District (Russian: Орло́вский райо́н) is an administrative and municipal district (raion), one of the twenty-four in Oryol Oblast, Russia. It is located in the center of the oblast. The area of the district is 1,701.4 square kilometers (656.9 sq mi). Its administrative center is the city of Oryol (which is not administratively a part of the district). Population: 67,384 (2010 Census); 66,167 (2002 census); 63,801 (1989 Soviet census).

== Administrative and municipal status ==
Within the framework of administrative divisions, Orlovsky District is one of the twenty-four in the oblast. The city of Oryol serves as its administrative center, despite being incorporated separately as a city of oblast significance—an administrative unit with the status equal to that of the districts.

As a municipal division, the district is incorporated as Orlovsky Municipal District. The city of oblast significance of Oryol is incorporated separately from the district as Oryol Urban Okrug.

== Notable residents ==
- Georgy Rodin (1897–1976), Red Army lieutenant general, born in Bolotovo village
- Grigory Zhilkin (born 2003), football player, born in Biofabrika
