= Zalegoshchensky District =

Zalegoshchensky District Залегощенский район (Russian)
- District
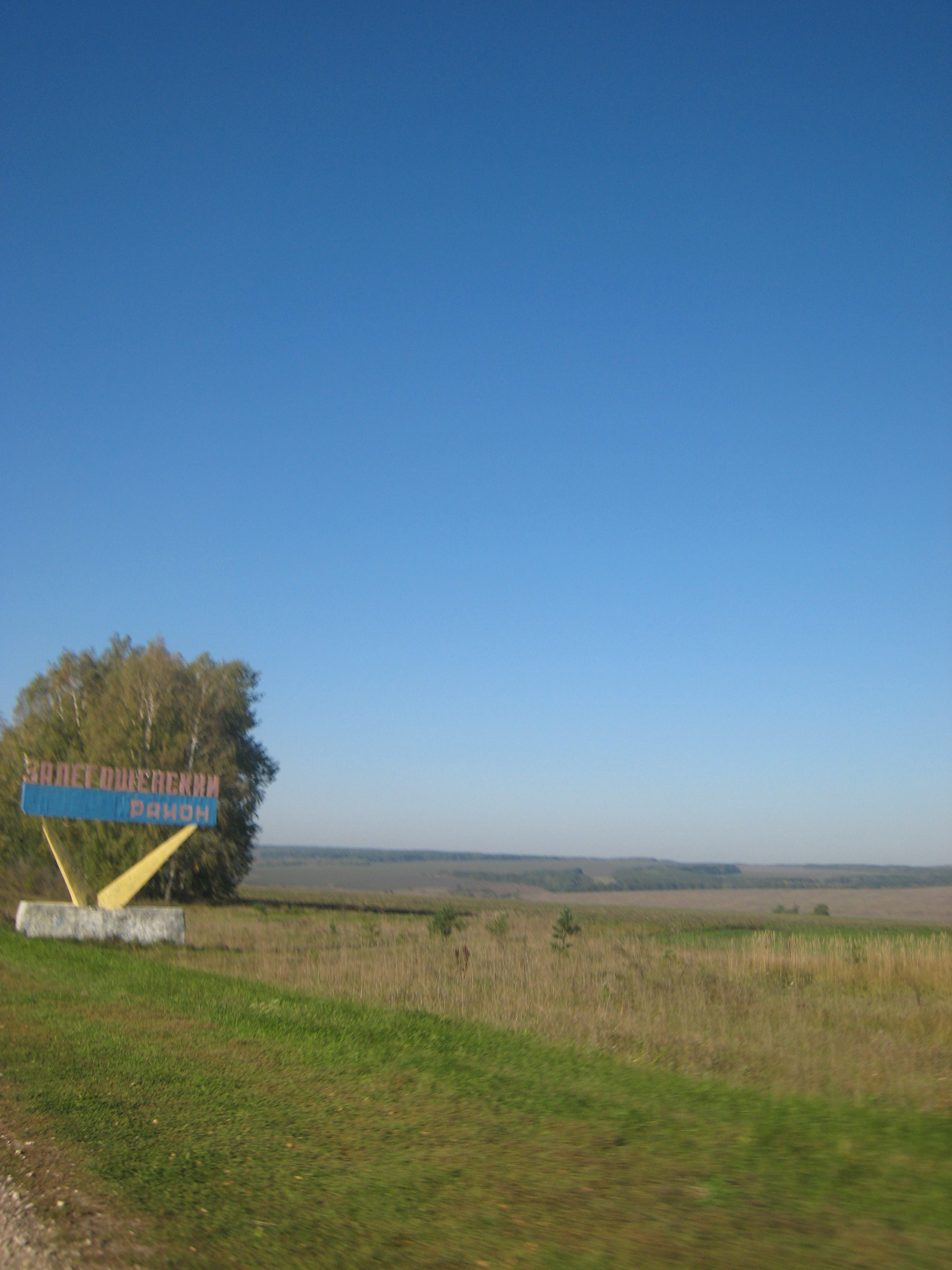
- Entrance overlook, Zalegoshchensky District

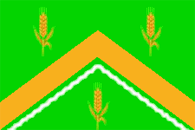
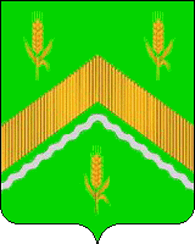
- Flag Coat of arms
- Location of Zalegoshchensky District in Oryol Oblast
- Coordinates: 52°54′03″N 36°53′13″E
- Country: Russia
- Federal subject: Oryol Oblast
- Established: 18 January 1935
- Administrative center: Zalegoshch

Area
  - Total: 1,138.0 km^{2} (439.4 sq mi)

Population (2010 Census)
  - Total: 15,376
  - Density: 13.511/km^{2} (34.994/sq mi)
  - Urban: 34.7%
  - Rural: 65.3%

Administrative structure
  - Administrative divisions: 1 Urban-type settlements, 10 Selsoviets
  - Inhabited localities: 1 urban-type settlements, 128 rural localities

Municipal structure
  - Municipally incorporated as: Zalegoshchensky Municipal District
  - Municipal divisions: 1 urban settlements, 10 rural settlements
- Time zone: UTC+3 (MSK)
- OKTMO ID: 54618000
- Website: http://admzalegosh.ru/

Zalegoshchensky District (Russian: Залегощенский райо́н) is an administrative and municipal district (raion), one of the twenty-four in Oryol Oblast, Russia. It is located in the center of the oblast. The area of the district is 1,138.0 square kilometers (439.4 sq mi). Its administrative center is the urban locality (an urban-type settlement) of Zalegoshch. Population: 15,376 (2010 Census); 17,802 (2002 census); 18,640 (1989 Soviet census). The population of Zalegoshch accounts for 34.7% of the district's total population.

== Notable residents ==
- Georgy Parshin (1916–1956), pilot, twice awarded Hero of the Soviet Union

== See also ==
- Ivan (village)
