= 2023 Oryol Oblast gubernatorial election =

- 8–10 September 2023
- Turnout: 55.98%
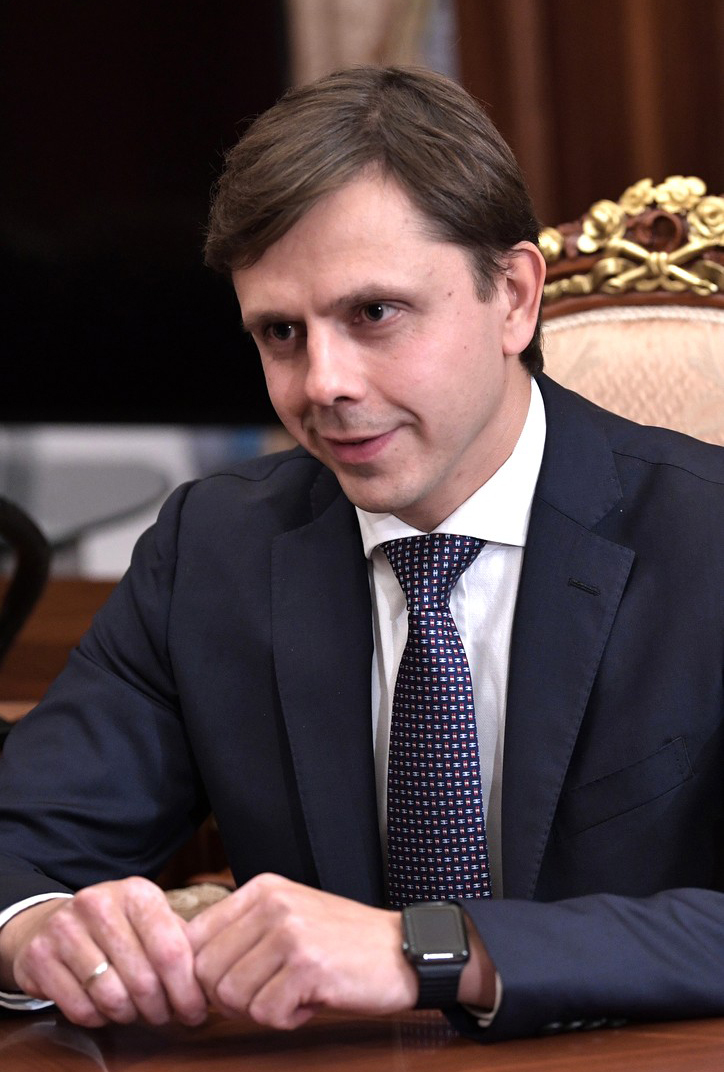
		LDPR	NL
Candidate	Andrey Klychkov	Vladislav Chislov	Svetlana Kovalyova
Party	CPRF	LDPR	New People
Popular vote	276,842	28,230	24,194
Percentage	82.09%	8.37%	7.17%
Governor before election
Andrey Klychkov
CPRF
Governor-elect
Andrey Klychkov
CPRF

The 2023 Oryol Oblast gubernatorial election took place on 8–10 September 2023, on common election day. Incumbent Governor Andrey Klychkov was re-elected to a second term in office.

== Background ==
CPRF faction leader in Moscow City Duma Andrey Klychkov was appointed acting Governor of Oryol Oblast in October 2017, replacing fellow Communist Party member Vadim Potomsky, who resigned at his own request. Klychkov easily won the election for a full term in September 2018 with 83.6% of the vote, defeating four opponents, however, the governor also had the support of United Russia.

Despite Governor Klychkov's early announcement of next gubernatorial campaign in June 2022, rumours of Klychkov's potential resignations have spread. Allegedly lack of accomplishments in economic and political development of Oryol Oblast, as well as inappropriate handling of mobilized troops' assistance led to dissatisfaction with governor's service. On the other hand, Klychkov's appointment was the result of informal arrangements with CPRF leader Gennady Zyuganov, an Oryol Oblast native, while the party held its grip on gubernatorial office since 2014. Among potential Klychkov's replacements were named former Head of Rostourism Zarina Doguzova, First Deputy Governor Vladimir Ivanovsky, Deputy Chairman of the Oryol City Council Vladimir Stroyev (nephew of former Governor Yegor Stroyev), former Moscow Police Commissioner Anatoly Yakunin, Chief Federal Inspector for Moscow Anatoly Belogurov, Oryol Oblast Council of People's Deputies member Vitaly Rybakov and Orthodox Christian activist Gennady Tsurkov. On June 8, 2023 President Vladimir Putin in a meeting with Andrey Klychkov endorsed the incumbent for a second gubernatorial term.

== Candidates ==
In Oryol Oblast candidates for Governor can be nominated only by registered political parties, self-nomination is not possible. However, candidates are not obliged to be members of the nominating party. Candidate for Governor of Oryol Oblast should be a Russian citizen and at least 30 years old. Candidates for Governor should not have a foreign citizenship or residence permit. Each candidate in order to be registered is required to collect at least 8% of signatures of members and heads of municipalities. Also gubernatorial candidates present 3 candidacies to the Federation Council and election winner later appoints one of the presented candidates.

=== Registered ===
- Vladislav Chislov (LDPR), Deputy Chairman of the Oryol Oblast Council of People's Deputies (2023–present), Member of Council of People's Deputies (2021–present)
- Andrey Klychkov (CPRF), incumbent Governor of Oryol Oblast (2017–present)
- Svetlana Kovalyova (New People), Member of Oryol Oblast Council of People's Deputies (2021–present), chairwoman of Oryol Oblast Chamber of Commerce and Industry

=== Withdrew after registration ===
- Vladimir Stebakov (The Greens), farmer, former Member of Orlovsky District Council of People's Deputies (2016–2021) (endorsed Klychkov)

=== Withdrew ===
- Vladislav Abramov (ROS), businessman, former Head of Oryol Transportation Committee (2006)

=== Declined ===
- Vladimir Ivanovsky (United Russia), First Deputy Governor of Oryol Oblast (2022–present)
- Ruslan Perelygin (SR–ZP), Member of Oryol Oblast Council of People's Deputies (2016–present), 2018 gubernatorial candidate
- Ivan Ustinov (RPPSS), Member of Oryol Oblast Council of People's Deputies (2021–present), 2018 gubernatorial candidate

=== Candidates for Federation Council ===
Incumbent Senator Vladimir Krugly (United Russia) was not renominated.

- Vladislav Chislov (LDPR):
  - Grigory Kolesov, jurisconsult
  - Pyotr Selin, Livny and Livensky District military commissariat employee
  - Dmitry Yudin, mining executive
- Andrey Klychkov (CPRF):
  - Olga Anisimova, director of Oryol Oblast branch office of Defenders of the Fatherland foundation
  - Vadim Sokolov (United Russia), First Deputy Governor of Oryol Oblast (2014–present)
  - Sergey Stupin, Chairman of Civic Chamber of Oryol Oblast (2023–present), director of Spasskoye-Lutovinovo museum complex, former Deputy Governor of Oryol Oblast (2015–2017)

== Finances ==
All sums are in rubles.

Financial Report	Source	Abramov	Chislov	Klychkov	Kovalyova	Stebakov
First		0	50,000	100,000	20,000	18,900
Final		0	1,550,000	33,282,000	882,726	18,900

== Polls ==
Fieldwork date	Polling firm	Klychkov	Chislov	Kovalyova	Stebakov	None	Lead
2 September 2023	INSOMAR	79%	7%	7%	5% (Note: already withdrawn)	2%	72%

== Results ==
Summary of the 8–10 September 2023 Oryol Oblast gubernatorial election results
Candidate	Party	Votes	%
Andrey Klychkov (incumbent)	Communist Party	276,842	82.09
Vladislav Chislov	Liberal Democratic Party	28,230	8.37
Svetlana Kovalyova	New People	24,194	7.17
Valid votes		329,266	97.63
Blank ballots		7,987	2.37
Total		337,253	100.00
Turnout		337,253	55.98
Registered voters		602,472	100.00

First Deputy Governor Vadim Sokolov (United Russia) was appointed to the Federation Council, replacing incumbent Vladimir Krugly (United Russia).

== See also ==
- 2023 Russian regional elections
