= 2026 Oryol Oblast legislative election =

Regional legislative election in Russia

- 18–20 September 2026

All 50 seats in the Council of People's Deputies 26 seats needed for a majority
- Turnout: 53.88% ▼4.69 pp
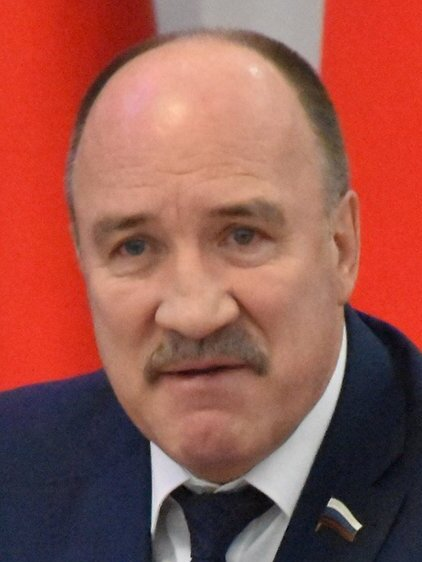

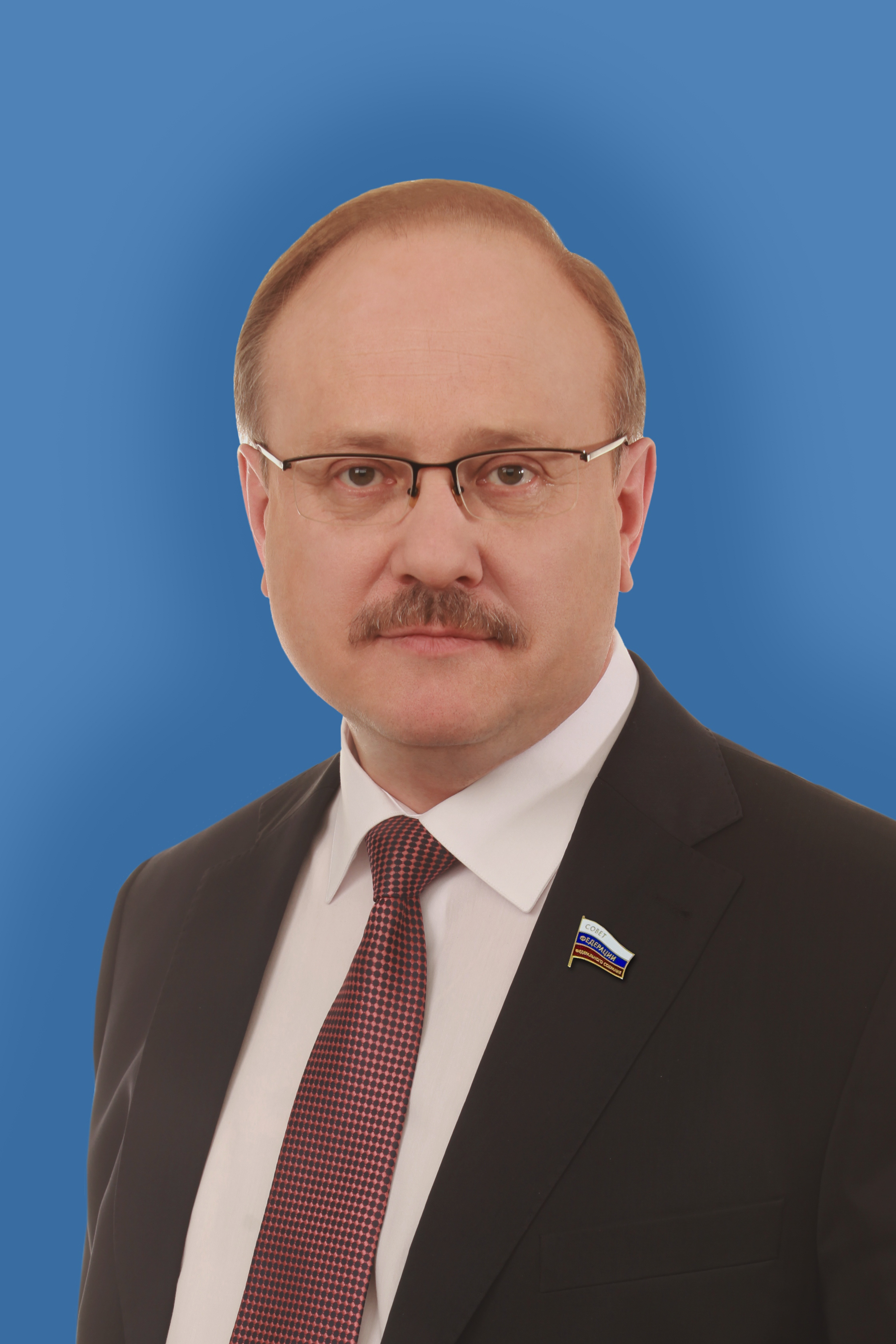

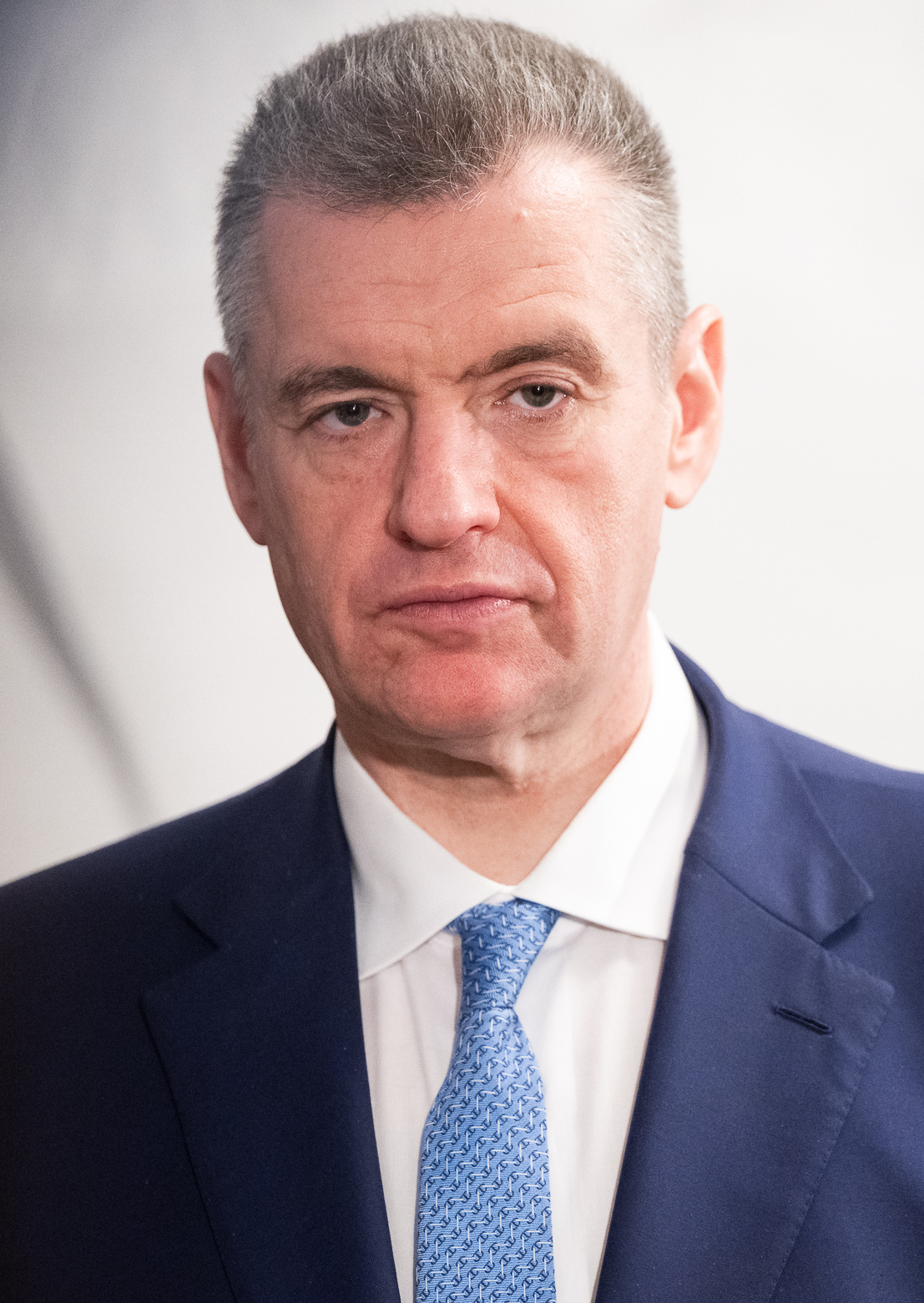
	Majority party	Minority party	Third party
Candidate	Leonid Muzalevsky	Vasily Ikonnikov	Ruslan Perelygin
Party	United Russia	CPRF	A Just Russia
Last election	37.05%, 27 seats	21.80%, 11 seats	12.75%, 6 seats
Seats won	28	13	5
Seat change	▲1	▲2	▼1
Popular vote	132,273	74,504	29,248
Percentage	42.15%	23.74%	9.32%
Swing	▲5.10 pp	▲1.94 pp	▼3.43 pp
	Fourth party	Fifth party	Sixth party
	NL		RPPSS
Candidate	Darya Chernykh	Leonid Slutsky	Ivan Ustinov
Party	New People	LDPR	Party of Pensioners
Last election	6.62%, 1 seat	9.94%, 3 seats	5.81%, 1 seat
Seats won	27,950	2	0
Seat change	2	▼1	▼1
Popular vote	▲1	27,656	12,536
Percentage	8.91%	8.81%	3.99%
Swing	▲2.29 pp	▼1.13 pp	▼1.82 pp
Chairman before election
Leonid Muzalevsky
United Russia
Elected Chairman
Leonid Muzalevsky
United Russia
Senator before election
Vasily Ikonnikov
CPRF
Senator after election
Vasily Ikonnikov
CPRF

The 2026 Oryol Oblast Council of People's Deputies election took place on 18–20 September 2026, on common election day, coinciding with the 2026 Russian legislative election. All 50 seats in the Council of People's Deputies were up for re-election.

United Russia slightly increased its majority in the Council of People's Deputies, winning 42.2% of the vote and 16 single-mandate constituencies. Communist Party of the Russian Federation and New People increased their vote share, gaining two and one seat, respectively. A Just Russia and Liberal Democratic Party of Russia lost one seat each but retained their factions. Russian Party of Pensioners for Social Justice failed to cross the 5% threshold and lost its single deputy.

== Electoral system ==
Under current election laws, the Council of People's Deputies is elected for a term of five years, with parallel voting. 25 seats are elected by party-list proportional representation with a 5% electoral threshold, with the other half elected in 25 single-member constituencies by first-past-the-post voting. Seats in the proportional part are allocated using the Imperiali quota, modified to ensure that every party list, which passes the threshold, receives at least one mandate.

== Candidates ==
=== Party lists ===
To register regional lists of candidates, parties need to collect 0.5% of signatures of all registered voters in Oryol Oblast.

The following parties were relieved from the necessity to collect signatures:

- United Russia
- Communist Party of the Russian Federation
- Liberal Democratic Party of Russia
- A Just Russia
- New People
- Russian Party of Pensioners for Social Justice

№	Party	Oblast-wide list	Candidates	Territorial groups	Status
1	Communist Party	Vasily Ikonnikov • Ivan Dynkovich	28	25	Registered
2	United Russia	Leonid Muzalevsky • Mikhail Vdovin • Pavel Merkulov • Dmitry Sidenko	49	25	Registered
3	New People	Darya Chernykh • Ruslan Devyatin • Yevgeny Anokhin • Sergey Sukhanov	37	22	Registered
4	Liberal Democratic Party	Leonid Slutsky • Vladislav Chislov • Dmitry Yudin	53	25	Registered
5	Party of Pensioners	Ivan Ustinov • Aleksandr Gladkov • Raisa Yevdokimova	22	19	Registered
6	A Just Russia	Ruslan Perelygin • Igor Rybakov • Sergey Chesnovich • Konstantin Kornilov	52	25	Registered

Russian Ecological Party "The Greens", which participated in the last election, did not file, while Party of Growth was dissolved and merged into New People.

=== Single-mandate constituencies ===
25 single-mandate constituencies were formed in Oryol Oblast. To register candidates in single-mandate constituencies need to collect 3% of signatures of registered voters in the constituency.

Number of candidates in single-mandate constituencies
Party	Candidates			
Party		United Russia	25	25
Communist Party	25	25		
A Just Russia	25	25		
Liberal Democratic Party	24	24		
New People	24	21		
Party of Pensioners	19	18		
Total	142	138		

== Results ==
=== Results by party lists ===
Summary of the 18–20 September 2026 Oryol Oblast Council of People's Deputies election results
Party	Party list					Constituency		Total	
Party	Votes	%	±pp	Seats	+/–	Seats	+/–	Seats	+/–
United Russia	132,273	42.15	▲5.10	12	▲1	16	Steady	28	▲1
Communist Party	74,504	23.74	▲1.94	7	▲1	6	▲1	13	▲2
A Just Russia	29,248	9.32	▼3.43	2	▼1	3	Steady	5	▼1
New People	27,950	8.91	▲2.29	2	▲1	0	New	2	▲1
Liberal Democratic Party	27,656	8.81	▼1.13	2	▼1	0	Steady	2	▼1
Party of Pensioners	12,536	3.99	▼1.82	0	▼1	0	Steady	0	▼1
Invalid ballots	9,667	3.08	▼0.50	—	—	—	—	—	—
Total	313,834	100.00	—	25	Steady	25	Steady	50	Steady
Turnout	313,834	53.88	▼4.69	—	—	—	—	—	—
Registered voters	582,510	100.00	—	—	—	—	—	—	—

Leonid Muzalevsky (United Russia) was re-elected as Chairman of the Council of People's Deputies, while incumbent Senator Vasily Ikonnikov (CPRF) was re-appointed to the Federation Council.

=== Results in single-member constituencies ===
==== District 1 ====
Summary of the 18–20 September 2026 Oryol Oblast Council of People's Deputies election in District 1
Candidate	Party	Votes	%
Oleg Koshelev (incumbent)	United Russia	4,253	45.86%
Yevgeny Iskorostinsky	New People	1,233	13.30%
Gennady Nikonovich	Communist Party	1,154	12.44%
Anna Azarova	A Just Russia	1,048	11.30%
Dmitry Skhvatkin	Liberal Democratic Party	633	6.83%
Valentina Komissarova	Party of Pensioners	534	5.76%
Total		9,274	100%

==== District 2 ====
Summary of the 18–20 September 2026 Oryol Oblast Council of People's Deputies election in District 2
Candidate	Party	Votes	%
Marina Franko	Communist Party	3,088	37.33%
Vitaly Rybakov	A Just Russia	1,433	17.32%
Aleksey Zubov	United Russia	1,365	16.50%
Ilya Purtov	New People	780	9.43%
Aleksandr Kuznetsov	Liberal Democratic Party	681	8.23%
Aleksandr Morozov	Party of Pensioners	445	5.38%
Total		8,273	100%

==== District 3 ====
Summary of the 18–20 September 2026 Oryol Oblast Council of People's Deputies election in District 3
Candidate	Party	Votes	%
Irina Gotsakova (incumbent)	United Russia	3,378	32.37%
Aleksey Usov	A Just Russia	2,252	21.58%
Aleksandr Bublikov	Communist Party	1,648	15.79%
Dmitry Goncharenko	New People	1,264	12.11%
Igor Novikov	Liberal Democratic Party	900	8.62%
Oleg Guryev	Party of Pensioners	482	4.62%
Total		10,435	100%

==== District 4 ====
Summary of the 18–20 September 2026 Oryol Oblast Council of People's Deputies election in District 4
Candidate	Party	Votes	%
Yevgeny Kosogov (incumbent)	A Just Russia	5,080	41.63%
Maksim Spiridonov	Communist Party	2,587	21.20%
Yelena Davydenko	United Russia	1,840	15.08%
Andrey Korkh	New People	1,234	10.11%
Dmitry Yudin	Liberal Democratic Party	963	7.89%
Total		12,203	100%

==== District 5 ====
Summary of the 18–20 September 2026 Oryol Oblast Council of People's Deputies election in District 5
Candidate	Party	Votes	%
Vitaly Rybakov (incumbent)	A Just Russia	6,066	51.57%
Oksana Pavlyuk	United Russia	2,313	19.67%
Sergey Shvalov	Communist Party	1,115	9.48%
Aleksey Kuzin	New People	916	7.79%
Ivan Vorobyev	Party of Pensioners	473	4.03%
Omar Gurgunayev	Liberal Democratic Party	393	3.34%
Total		11,762	100%

==== District 6 ====
Summary of the 18–20 September 2026 Oryol Oblast Council of People's Deputies election in District 6
Candidate	Party	Votes	%
Vladimir Stroyev	United Russia	4,865	43.58%
Yevgeny Prokopov (incumbent)	Communist Party	1,738	15.57%
Sergey Sukhanov	New People	1,316	11.79%
Sergey Yelesin	A Just Russia	1,308	11.72%
Aleksey Kireyev	Liberal Democratic Party	849	7.61%
Mikhail Usov	Party of Pensioners	584	5.23%
Total		11,163	100%

==== District 7 ====
Summary of the 18–20 September 2026 Oryol Oblast Council of People's Deputies election in District 7
Candidate	Party	Votes	%
Aleksandr Makarov (incumbent)	Communist Party	2,812	26.80%
Larisa Sidyakina	United Russia	2,296	21.89%
Dmitry Seregin	A Just Russia	1,871	17.83%
Anna Smolyakova	New People	1,692	16.13%
Yegor Gordeyev	Liberal Democratic Party	1,298	12.37%
Total		10,491	100%

==== District 8 ====
Summary of the 18–20 September 2026 Oryol Oblast Council of People's Deputies election in District 8
Candidate	Party	Votes	%
Andrey Frolov (incumbent)	Communist Party	3,533	36.28%
Darya Kondrashova	United Russia	1,745	17.92%
Valery Shirin	New People	1,367	14.04%
Yulia Aydanova	Liberal Democratic Party	1,360	13.96%
Viktor Panukhnik	A Just Russia	1,206	12.38%
Total		9,739	100%

==== District 9 ====
Summary of the 18–20 September 2026 Oryol Oblast Council of People's Deputies election in District 9
Candidate	Party	Votes	%
Igor Rybakov (incumbent)	A Just Russia	5,327	48.05%
Konstantin Krivonogov	United Russia	2,356	21.25%
Sergey Uspensky	Communist Party	1,152	10.39%
Roman Ushakov	New People	953	8.60%
Anastasia Kudashkina	Liberal Democratic Party	602	5.43%
Yevgeny Sorin	Party of Pensioners	339	3.06%
Total		11,086	100%

==== District 10 ====
Summary of the 18–20 September 2026 Oryol Oblast Council of People's Deputies election in District 10
Candidate	Party	Votes	%
Aleksandr Rodin	United Russia	5,101	42.49%
Nikolay Osipov	Communist Party	2,256	18.79%
Igor Konovalov	A Just Russia	2,003	16.68%
Yury Cherepkin	Liberal Democratic Party	1,156	9.63%
Andrey Tyutyunnikov	Party of Pensioners	838	6.98%
Total		12,006	100%

==== District 11 ====
Summary of the 18–20 September 2026 Oryol Oblast Council of People's Deputies election in District 11
Candidate	Party	Votes	%
Vadim Sezin (incumbent)	United Russia	4,888	41.24%
Gennady Zakharov	Communist Party	2,769	23.36%
Denis Bulgakov	A Just Russia	1,198	10.11%
Andrey Savenkov	Liberal Democratic Party	1,007	8.50%
Anna Brusova	New People	975	8.23%
Alla Martynova	Party of Pensioners	544	4.59%
Total		11,852	100%

==== District 12 ====
Summary of the 18–20 September 2026 Oryol Oblast Council of People's Deputies election in District 12
Candidate	Party	Votes	%
Yelena Astakhova (incumbent)	United Russia	5,309	49.65%
Aleksandr Bakhtin	Communist Party	2,377	22.23%
Pyotr Selin	Liberal Democratic Party	947	8.86%
Tatyana Semyonova	Party of Pensioners	873	8.16%
Vladimir Grishin	A Just Russia	677	6.33%
Total		10,692	100%

==== District 13 ====
Summary of the 18–20 September 2026 Oryol Oblast Council of People's Deputies election in District 13
Candidate	Party	Votes	%
Aleksandr Sorokin	United Russia	6,155	49.41%
Sergey Poleyatev	Communist Party	2,576	20.68%
Valery Svorotov	Liberal Democratic Party	1,197	9.61%
Aleksandr Kharlamov	New People	846	6.79%
Igor Pakhomov	A Just Russia	661	5.31%
Larisa Skuridina	Party of Pensioners	612	4.91%
Total		12,457	100%

==== District 14 ====
Summary of the 18–20 September 2026 Oryol Oblast Council of People's Deputies election in District 14
Candidate	Party	Votes	%
Yana Kotenyova	United Russia	2,619	25.31%
Aleksandr Ivanov	Communist Party	2,038	19.69%
Ruslan Perelygin	A Just Russia	1,863	18.00%
Ruslan Devyatin	New People	1,329	12.84%
Vladimir Ivanov	Liberal Democratic Party	1,174	11.35%
Tamara Shiryayeva	Party of Pensioners	670	6.47%
Total		10,348	100%

==== District 15 ====
Summary of the 18–20 September 2026 Oryol Oblast Council of People's Deputies election in District 15
Candidate	Party	Votes	%
Ivan Grachev (incumbent)	United Russia	8,459	56.31%
Sergey Zakharov	Communist Party	3,683	24.52%
Kristina Penner	Liberal Democratic Party	701	4.67%
Sergey Markelov	New People	700	4.66%
Galina Sukhacheva	A Just Russia	621	4.13%
Olga Polyakova	Party of Pensioners	465	3.10%
Total		15,021	100%

==== District 16 ====
Summary of the 18–20 September 2026 Oryol Oblast Council of People's Deputies election in District 16
Candidate	Party	Votes	%
Vyacheslav Goltsov	Communist Party	4,200	33.01%
Yelena Tsygankova	United Russia	2,982	23.44%
Roman Neverov	New People	1,664	13.08%
Viktor Makarov (incumbent)	A Just Russia	1,652	12.98%
Grigory Kolesov	Liberal Democratic Party	1,430	11.24%
Total		12,723	100%

==== District 17 ====
Summary of the 18–20 September 2026 Oryol Oblast Council of People's Deputies election in District 17
Candidate	Party	Votes	%
Irina Pashkova (incumbent)	United Russia	4,765	35.20%
Sergey Mosin	Liberal Democratic Party	2,030	14.99%
Sergey Kondratov	Communist Party	1,960	14.48%
Valery Shevlyakov	New People	1,672	12.35%
Nikolay Gryadunov	A Just Russia	1,528	11.29%
Nikolay Tkachenko	Party of Pensioners	706	5.21%
Total		13,538	100%

==== District 18 ====
Summary of the 18–20 September 2026 Oryol Oblast Council of People's Deputies election in District 18
Candidate	Party	Votes	%
Vladimir Shashkov (incumbent)	United Russia	11,000	65.32%
Aleksandr Bykov	Communist Party	3,250	19.30%
Marina Kochetygova	New People	657	3.90%
Tatyana Borisova	Party of Pensioners	654	3.88%
Anastasia Cherkasova	Liberal Democratic Party	615	3.65%
Mikhail Petrov	A Just Russia	321	1.91%
Total		16,839	100%

==== District 19 ====
Summary of the 18–20 September 2026 Oryol Oblast Council of People's Deputies election in District 19
Candidate	Party	Votes	%
Dmitry Ponitkin (incumbent)	United Russia	8,444	70.03%
Ivan Sapelkin	Communist Party	1,304	10.81%
Oksana Kazakova	A Just Russia	638	5.29%
Varvara Pesotskaya	Liberal Democratic Party	479	3.97%
Grigory Rozhkov	New People	468	3.88%
Aleksey Socheykin	Party of Pensioners	341	2.83%
Total		12,058	100%

==== District 20 ====
Summary of the 18–20 September 2026 Oryol Oblast Council of People's Deputies election in District 20
Candidate	Party	Votes	%
Artyom Levkovsky	Communist Party	6,767	44.76%
Natalya Luchkina	United Russia	3,490	23.08%
Aleksey Anikeyev	Liberal Democratic Party	2,323	15.36%
Yekaterina Kireyeva	New People	1,219	8.06%
Viktor Levkin	A Just Russia	900	5.95%
Total		15,119	100%

==== District 21 ====
Summary of the 18–20 September 2026 Oryol Oblast Council of People's Deputies election in District 21
Candidate	Party	Votes	%
Yury Boyev	Communist Party	5,750	44.09%
Vyacheslav Korneyev	United Russia	2,970	22.77%
Sergey Latyshev	A Just Russia	2,174	16.67%
Yevgeny Anokhin	New People	1,206	9.25%
Nikolay Vlasenko	Liberal Democratic Party	651	4.99%
Total		13,042	100%

==== District 22 ====
Summary of the 18–20 September 2026 Oryol Oblast Council of People's Deputies election in District 22
Candidate	Party	Votes	%
Andrey Tsurkov	United Russia	9,666	61.14%
Yelena Lazareva	Communist Party	2,914	18.43%
Igor Gvozdev	A Just Russia	1,550	9.80%
Vera Grinenko	Party of Pensioners	1,208	7.64%
Total		15,810	100%

==== District 23 ====
Summary of the 18–20 September 2026 Oryol Oblast Council of People's Deputies election in District 23
Candidate	Party	Votes	%
Mikhail Zhilin (incumbent)	United Russia	8,320	58.34%
Aleksandr Kamyshnikov	Communist Party	2,550	17.88%
Artur Mnatsakanyan	Liberal Democratic Party	1,462	10.25%
Aleksey Nesterov	Party of Pensioners	923	6.47%
Yevgeny Skrabov	A Just Russia	641	4.49%
Total		14,262	100%

==== District 24 ====
Summary of the 18–20 September 2026 Oryol Oblast Council of People's Deputies election in District 24
Candidate	Party	Votes	%
Aleksandr Grachev (incumbent)	United Russia	7,457	53.81%
Dmitry Grishayev	Communist Party	2,966	21.40%
Ruslan Mezhuyev	New People	1,175	8.48%
Roman Zakharkin	Liberal Democratic Party	1,119	8.07%
Vitaly Salnikov	A Just Russia	762	5.50%
Total		13,859	100%

==== District 25 ====
Summary of the 18–20 September 2026 Oryol Oblast Council of People's Deputies election in District 25
Candidate	Party	Votes	%
Sergey Potemkin (incumbent)	United Russia	12,396	88.24%
Iraida Kuznetsova	Communist Party	666	4.74%
Nikita Baranovsky	New People	226	1.61%
Lilia Lisovenko	Liberal Democratic Party	221	1.57%
Valery Novikov	Party of Pensioners	200	1.42%
Semyon Zheronkin	A Just Russia	184	1.31%
Total		14,048	100%

=== Members ===
Incumbent deputies are highlighted with bold, elected members who declined to take a seat are marked with ~~strikethrough~~.

Constituency
No.	Member	Party
1	Oleg Koshelev	United Russia
2	Marina Franko	Communist Party
3	Irina Gotsakova	United Russia
4	Yevgeny Kosogov	A Just Russia
5	Vitaly Rybakov	A Just Russia
6	Vladimir Stroyev	United Russia
7	Aleksandr Makarov	Communist Party
8	Andrey Frolov	Communist Party
9	Igor Rybakov	A Just Russia
10	Aleksandr Rodin	United Russia
11	Vadim Sezin	United Russia
12	Yelena Astakhova	United Russia
13	Aleksandr Sorokin	United Russia
14	Yana Kotenyova	United Russia
15	Ivan Grachev	United Russia
16	Vyacheslav Goltsov	Communist Party
17	Irina Pashkova	United Russia
18	Vladimir Shashkov	United Russia
19	Dmitry Ponitkin	United Russia
20	Artyom Levkovsky	Communist Party
21	Yury Boyev	Communist Party
22	Andrey Tsurkov	United Russia
23	Mikhail Zhilin	United Russia
24	Aleksandr Grachev	United Russia
25	Sergey Potemkin	United Russia

Party lists
Member	Party
Leonid Muzalevsky	United Russia
Mikhail Vdovin	United Russia
Pavel Merkulov	United Russia
Dmitry Sidenko	United Russia
Vladimir Filonov	United Russia
Andrey Kladov	United Russia
Andrey Sokolov	United Russia
Sergey Verizhnikov	United Russia
Maksim Lagutin	United Russia
Sergey Potemkin	United Russia
~~Sergey Shelamov~~	United Russia
Yulia Malfanova	United Russia
~~Anastasia Faskhutdinova~~	United Russia
Oleg Karpikov	United Russia
Vasily Ikonnikov	Communist Party
Ivan Dynkovich	Communist Party
Ruslan Frayda	Communist Party
Aleksandr Bakhtin	Communist Party
Sergey Zakharov	Communist Party
Aleksandr Kamyshnikov	Communist Party
Dmitry Grishayev	Communist Party
~~Ruslan Perelygin~~	A Just Russia
Sergey Chesnovich	A Just Russia
~~Konstantin Kornilov~~	A Just Russia
~~Yelena Bobkova~~	A Just Russia
Diana Voyna	A Just Russia
Darya Chernykh	New People
Ruslan Devyatin	New People
~~Leonid Slutsky~~	Liberal Democratic Party
Vladislav Chislov	Liberal Democratic Party
Dmitry Yudin	Liberal Democratic Party

== See also ==
- 2026 Russian regional elections
