= Nikolay Yudin =

Russian politician

- Николай Юдин

Head of Oryol Oblast Administration
- In office 5 December 1991 – 13 April 1993
- Succeeded by: Yegor Stroyev

Personal details
- Born: Nikolay Pavlovich Yudin; 1938 Soviet Union
- Died: 2014 (aged 75–76) Oryol, Russia

Nikolay Pavlovich Yudin (Russian: Николай Павлович Юдин; 1938 – 2014), was a Russian politician who had served as the first governor of Oryol Oblast from 1991 to 1993.

== Biography ==
Nikolay Yudin was born in 1938.

He was a member of the CPSU until August 1991. Yudin served as head of the administration of the Mtsensk district of the Oryol region, then worked as the director of the Spasskoye-Lutovinovo museum, and then as the director of the Mtsensk agrotechnical vocational school.

On 5 December 1991, Yudin was appointed by decree of President Boris Yeltsin as the first Governor (head) of the Oryol Oblast. However, he did not receive support from the Oryol Oblast Council of People's Deputies and remained acting for one year.

In April 1993, elections were held for the head of the Oryol Oblast, in which Yegor Stroyev won. On 11 May 1993, by decree of Yeltsin, Yudin was relieved of his duties as Governor (head) of the Oryol Oblast due to the expiration of his term of office, and Stroyev became the new governor.

On 5 July 1993, Yudin was appointed as the plenipotentiary representative of the President of Russia in the Oryol Oblast. He left office on 8 November 1994. In December 1995, Yudin unsuccessfully participated in the elections to the State Duma in the Oryol constituency, taking third place.

He died in 2014.
