= Marina Rogacheva =

Russian politician (born 1965)

- Марина Рогачёва

Senator from Oryol Oblast
- In office May 2004 – February 2009
- Preceded by: Pavel Merkulov
- Succeeded by: Yegor Stroyev

Personal details
- Born: Marina Rogacheva; 22 January 1965 (age 61)
- Education: Orel State University

Marina Georgievna Rogacheva (Russian: Марина Георгиевна Рогачёва; born 22 January 1965) is a Russian politician who served as a senator from Oryol Oblast from 2004 to 2009.

== Career ==
Marina Rogacheva was born on 22 January 1965 in the family of the future senator from the Oryol Oblast Yegor Stroyev. Later she served as Deputy Governor of Oryol Oblast. From 2004 to 2009, she represented Oryol Oblast in the Federation Council.

== Family ==
She was married to FSB Major General Alexander Rogachev, whom she divorced in 2002. From 1997 to 2000, he was an adviser to the chairman of the Federation Council, his father-in-law Yegor Stroyev, and also engaged in business. On 22 February 2009, a few days after the resignation of his ex-wife, Alexander Rogachev was found murdered in his Toyota Land Cruiser.
