= Vadim Sokolov (politician) =

- Вадим Соколов
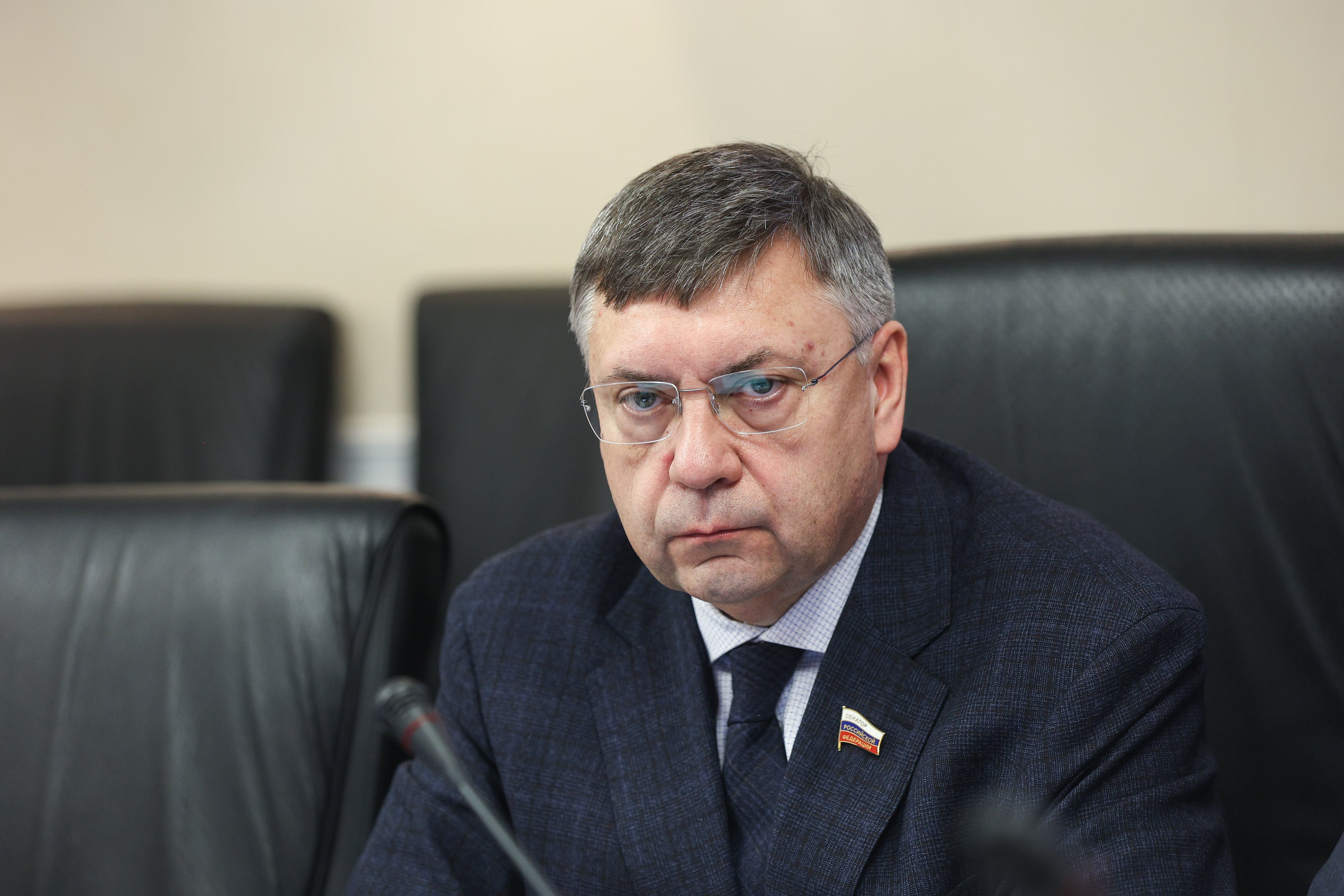

Senator from Oryol Oblast
- Incumbent
- Assumed office 29 September 2023
- Preceded by: Vladimir Krugly

Personal details
- Born: 30 August 1967 (age 59) Oryol, RSFSR, Soviet Union
- Party: United Russia
- Parent: Vyacheslav Sokolov (father)

Vadim Vyacheslavovich Sokolov (Russian: Вадим Вячеславович Соколов; born August 30, 1967, in Oryol) is a Russian politician and a Senator of the Federation Council (since 2023). He is a member of the Federation Council Committee on Rules and Organization of Parliamentary Activities.

== Biography ==
He was born on August 30, 1967, in Oryol. His father was politician Vyacheslav Sokolov (1941–2024). In 1991, he graduated from the Oryol State Pedagogical Institute, specializing in teaching history, social science, and the foundations of the Soviet state and law. The Pedagogical Institute was later reorganized into Oryol State University, and in 2010, Sokolov graduated from its law faculty (he defended his dissertation there for a PhD in history that same year).

Since 1997, he has worked in the Oryol city administration, serving as deputy mayor. In 2006, he was elected to the Oryol City Council as an independent candidate. From 2007 to 2010, he held various positions in the Oryol Oblast administration, and from 2011 to 2014, he served as Chairman of the Oryol Oblast Electoral Commission. In 2014, he was appointed Acting Deputy Governor of the Oryol Oblast under Vadim Potomsky and Chief of Staff to the Governor and Government. From October 2014, he became Deputy Governor and Chief of Staff. In 2017, he retained his position under the new Governor, Andrei Klychkov, and in 2018, he became First Deputy Governor and Chairman of the Government of the Oryol Oblast.

On September 16, 2023, he was appointed a member of the Federation Council and a representative of the executive body of state power of the Oryol Oblast.

== Awards ==
- Medal of the Order "For Merit to the Fatherland", 1st Class.
- Medal of the Order "For Merit to the Fatherland", 2nd Class.
- Russian Federation Presidential Certificate of Honour (June 6, 2024) - for active participation in the preparation and holding of socially significant events.
