= Vasily Ikonnikov =

Russian politician (born 1961)

- Василий Иконников
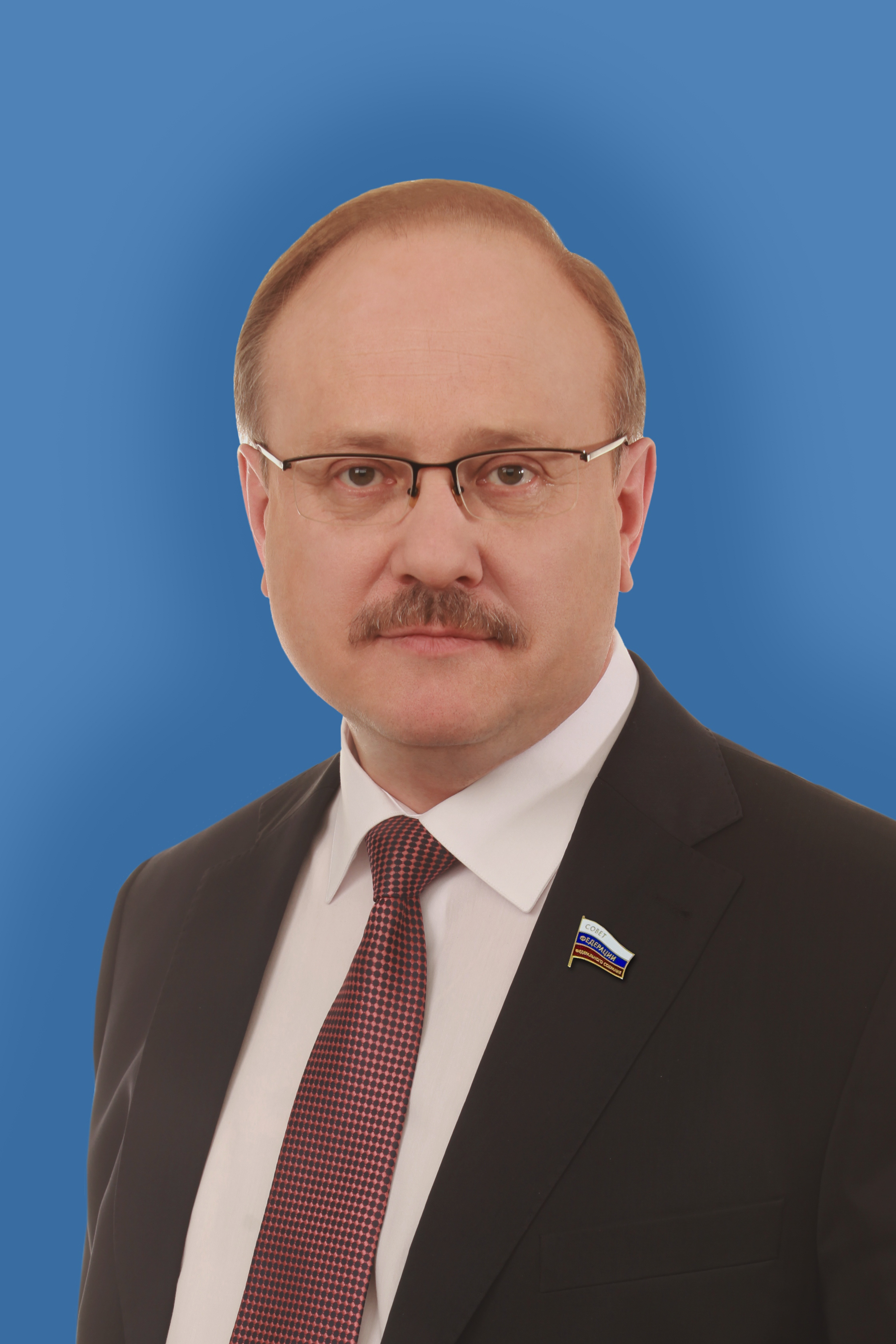

Senator from Oryol Oblast
- Incumbent
- Assumed office 6 October 2021
- Preceded by: Sergey Shcheblygin

Personal details
- Born: Vasily Ikonnikov; 26 April 1961 (age 65) Oryol, Russian Soviet Socialist Republic, Soviet Union
- Party: Communist Party of the Russian Federation
- Education: All-Union Correspondence Institute of Civil Engineering

Vasily Nikolayevich Ikonnikov (Russian: Василий Николаевич Иконников; born 26 April 1961) is a Russian politician serving as a senator from Oryol Oblast since 6 October 2021.

== Biography ==
Vasily Ikonnikov was born on 26 April 1961 in Oryol. In 1988, he graduated from the All-Union Correspondence Institute of Civil Engineering. From 1980 to 1982, he served in the Soviet Army. From 1982 to 1991, he worked in the Komsomol and party bodies of the city of Orel and the Oryol Oblast. From 1995 to 1997, he was the deputy of the Oryol Oblast Duma. On 18 March 2001, he was elected to Oryol Council of People's Deputies. From 2007 to 2011, Ikonnikov was the deputy of the Orel Council of People's Deputies. From 2011 to 2016, he was the deputy of the 6th State Duma. From October 2017, he has become the senator from the Legislative Assembly of Oryol Oblast. In 2021, he was re-elected.

=== Sanctions ===
Vasily Ikonnikov is under personal sanctions introduced by the European Union, the United Kingdom, the USA, Canada, Switzerland, Australia, Ukraine, New Zealand, for ratifying the decisions of the "Treaty of Friendship, Cooperation and Mutual Assistance between the Russian Federation and the Donetsk People's Republic and between the Russian Federation and the Luhansk People's Republic" and providing political and economic support for Russia's annexation of Ukrainian territories.
