= Governor of Oryol Oblast =

Highest-ranking official in Oryol Oblast, Russia

- Coat of arms of Oryol Oblast

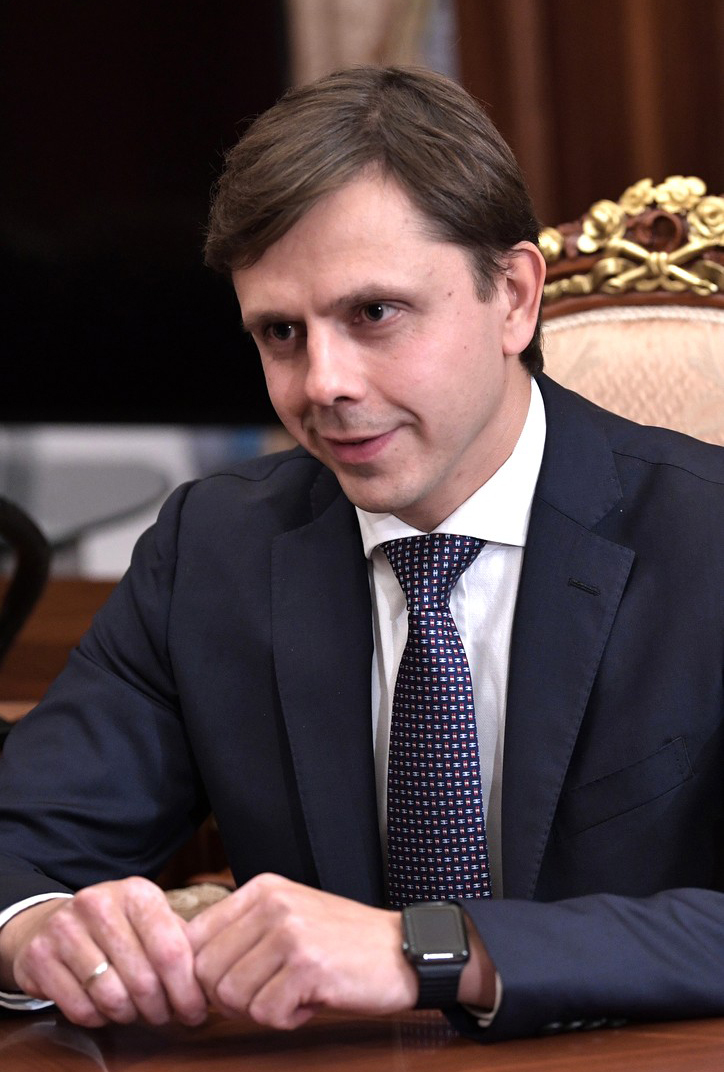
- Incumbent; Andrey Klychkov since 14 September 2018
- Status: Head of Federal Subject
- Seat: Oryol
- Appointer: Elected by people
- Term length: Five years, renewable once
- Inaugural holder: Nikolay Yudin
- Formation: 1991

The Governor of Oryol Oblast (Russian: Губернатор Орловской области) is the highest official of Oryol Oblast. They head the highest executive body of state power in the region - the Administration of Oryol Oblast.

== History ==
Initially, Oryol Oblast was headed by the head of the regional administration. Since 1993, this was Yegor Stroyev. On 26 February 1996, the post of the head of the administration was changed to the governor's one, with Yegor Stroyev becoming the first governor of the region.

On 16 February 2009, Yegor Stroyev voluntarily left the post of governor. Russian President Dmitry Medvedev accepted his resignation and appointed the interim governor Aleksandr Kozlov (a member of the United Russia party). On the same day, President Medvedev submitted to the Oryol Oblast Council of People's Deputies the candidacy of Kozlov to give him the powers of governor. On 27 February at a meeting of the Oryol Regional Council of People's Deputies, the issue of vesting Alexander Kozlov with the powers of the governor was considered. According to the results of the vote, Kozlov was unanimously approved as the governor of Oryol Oblast. At the end of the meeting, the inauguration ceremony took place. After the end of his term of office, Vadim Potomsky was appointed acting governor for the period before the elections.

On 4 October 2017, Russian President Vladimir Putin signed a decree terminating the powers of the Governor of Oryol Oblast, Vadim Potomsky. He appointed the deputy of the Moscow City Duma Andrey Klychkov as the acting governor of the region.

On 14 September 2018, Andrey Klychkov won the elections for the head of the region, with 83.55 percent of the vote.

== Governors of Oryol Oblast ==
No.	Portrait	Governor	Tenure	Time in office	Party	Election
1		Nikolay Yudin (1938–2014)	5 December 1991 – 13 April 1993 (lost election)	1 year, 129 days	Independent	Appointed
2		Yegor Stroyev (born 1937)	13 April 1993 – 16 February 2009 (resigned)	15 years, 309 days	Independent → United Russia	1993; 1997; 2001; 2005 (Note: Appointed by the president of Russia with the consent of the Oryol Oblast Council of People's Deputies.)
—		Aleksandr Kozlov (1949–2021)	16 February 2009 – 27 February 2009	5 years, 10 days	United Russia	Acting
3		Aleksandr Kozlov (1949–2021)	27 February 2009 – 26 February 2014 (term end)	5 years, 10 days	United Russia	2009
—		Vadim Potomsky (born 1972)	26 February 2014 – 23 September 2014	3 years, 221 days	Communist Party	Acting
4		Vadim Potomsky (born 1972)	23 September 2014 – 5 October 2017 (resigned)	3 years, 221 days	Communist Party	2014
—		Andrey Klychkov (born 1979)	5 October 2017 – 14 September 2018	9 years, 25 days	Communist Party	Acting
5		Andrey Klychkov (born 1979)	14 September 2018 – present	9 years, 25 days	Communist Party	2018; 2023
