= Vyacheslav Sokolov =

Russian politician (1941–2024)

- Вячеслав Соколов

Member of the State Duma
- In office 17 December 1995 – 19 December 1999

Personal details
- Born: Vyacheslav Konstantinovich Sokolov; 13 August 1941 Chelyabinsk, Russian SFSR, USSR
- Died: 5 February 2024 (aged 82) Oryol, Russia
- Party: CPRF
- Children: Vadim Sokolov
- Education: Moscow State University of Instrument Engineering and Computer Science
- Occupation: Engineer

Vyacheslav Konstantinovich Sokolov (Russian: Вячеслав Константинович Соколов; 13 August 1941 – 5 February 2024) was a Russian engineer and politician. A member of the Communist Party of the Russian Federation, he served in the State Duma from 1995 to 1999.

Sokolov died in Oryol on 5 February 2024, at the age of 82.
