= Aleksandr Kozlov (politician, born 1949) =

Russian politician (1949–2021)

- Александр Козлов
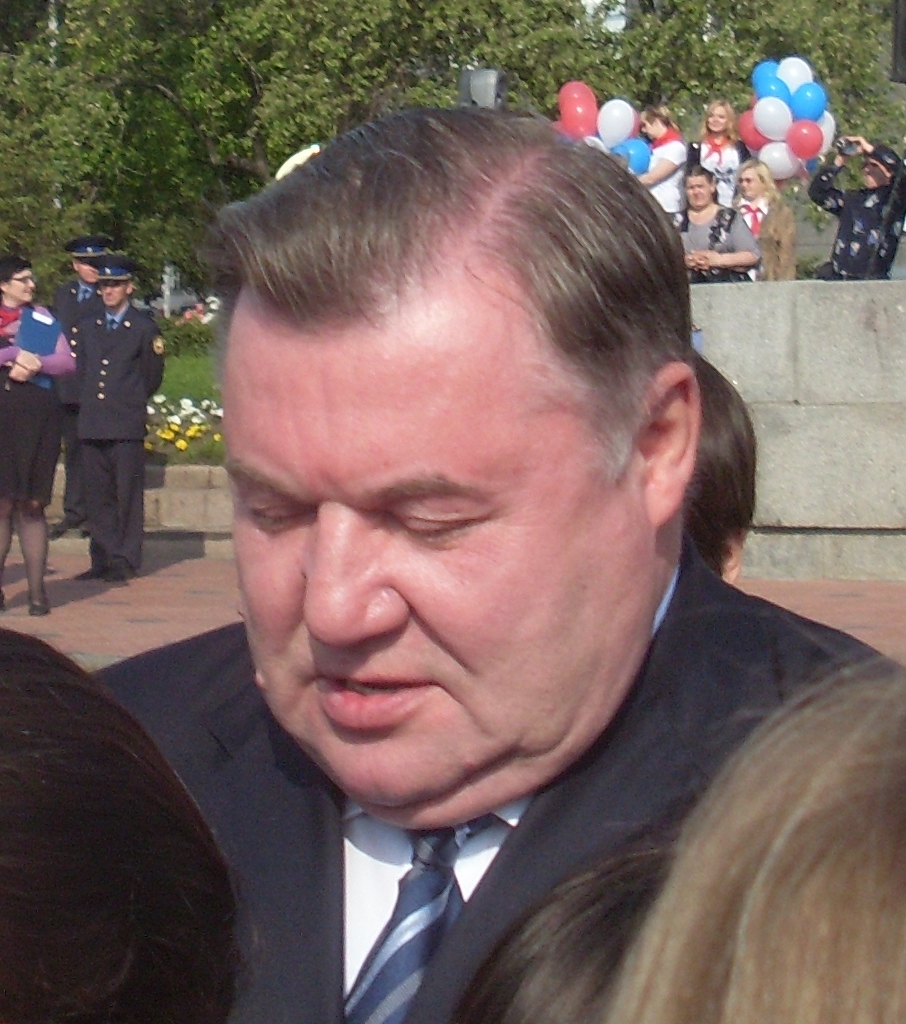
- Kozlov in 2011

3rd Governor of Oryol Oblast
- In office 27 February 2009 – 26 February 2014 (acting) 16 February 2009 - 27 February 2009
- Preceded by: Yegor Stroyev
- Succeeded by: Vadim Potomsky

Deputy Minister of Agriculture
- In office April 2004 – 16 February 2009

Personal details
- Born: Aleksandr Petrovich Kozlov; 2 May 1949 Seitovo, Russian SFSR, Soviet Union
- Died: 6 February 2021 (aged 71) Moscow, Russia
- Party: United Russia
- Children: 2 sons

Aleksandr Petrovich Kozlov (Russian: Александр Петрович Козлов; 2 May 1949 – 6 February 2021), was a Russian politician who had last served as the third Governor of Oryol Oblast from 2009 to 2014. He had the federal state civilian service rank of 1st class Active State Councillor of the Russian Federation.

== Biography ==
Aleksandr Kozlov was born on 2 May 1949 in Seitovo, Verkhneuslonsky District, then part of the Tatar Autonomous Soviet Socialist Republic, Russian Soviet Federative Socialist Republic, in the Soviet Union. Starting in 1968, he worked in the control and audit bodies of the Tatar Autonomous Soviet Socialist Republic. In 1979, he graduated from the Kazan Institute of Finance and Economics V.V. Kuibyshev.

In 1984, Kozlov moved to the Ministry of Finance of the USSR, where he held the positions of Deputy Head of the Department of the Control and Auditing Department, Deputy Head of the Department of Labor Organization and Wages of Financial and Insurance Bodies, Deputy Head of the Planning and Financing Department of the System, Deputy Head of the Subdivision of the Personnel and Training Department within the institutions, and head of the personnel subdivision of the central apparatus of the Personnel and educational institutions department.

In 1989, Kozlov moved to the USSR People's Control Committee, where he held the positions of inspector, leading inspector of the planning and financial bodies department. After the reorganization of the department in 1991, he was the head of the inspection of the Main Directorate of Budgetary and Financial Control of the USSR Control Chamber. In 1991, at work in the Presidential Administration of Russia, head of the State Audit Department of the Control Directorate, later, and then became the Deputy Head of the Control Directorate of the Presidential Administration of Russia. In 1992 in the Apparatus of the Government of Russia, he became the Head of the Regional Policy Department, the Head of the Department for Cooperation with the Regions of Russia, and the Head of the Department for Cooperation with Subjects of Russia of the Office of the Government of Russia.

From 1996 to 1998, Kozlov was the Deputy Chief of Staff of the Government of Russia as the Head of the Department for Interaction with Subjects of Russia and Relations with the Federation Council of the Staff of the Government of Russia. From 1998 to 1999 he was the Vice President and the Head of the Business Support Unit of OJSC TNK. From 1999 to 2004, he was the Deputy Chief of Staff of the Government of Russia. From April 2004 to 16 February 2009, Kozlov was the Deputy Minister of Agriculture.

Since 16 February 2009, Kozlov was the acting governor of Oryol Oblast. He officially took office on 27 February. According to the efficiency rating compiled by the Izvestia newspaper, he was 74th out of 81 governors. From 4 January to 28 July 2012, he was a member of the Presidium of the State Council of Russia. On 26 February 2014, he was dismissed as the Governor by the decree of President Vladimir Putin.

Aleksandr Petrovich Kozlov died at the age of 71 in Moscow on 6 February 2021 after a long illness.

== Family ==
Kozlov was married and had two sons.
