= Vadim Potomsky =

Russian politician (born 1972)

- Вадим Потомский
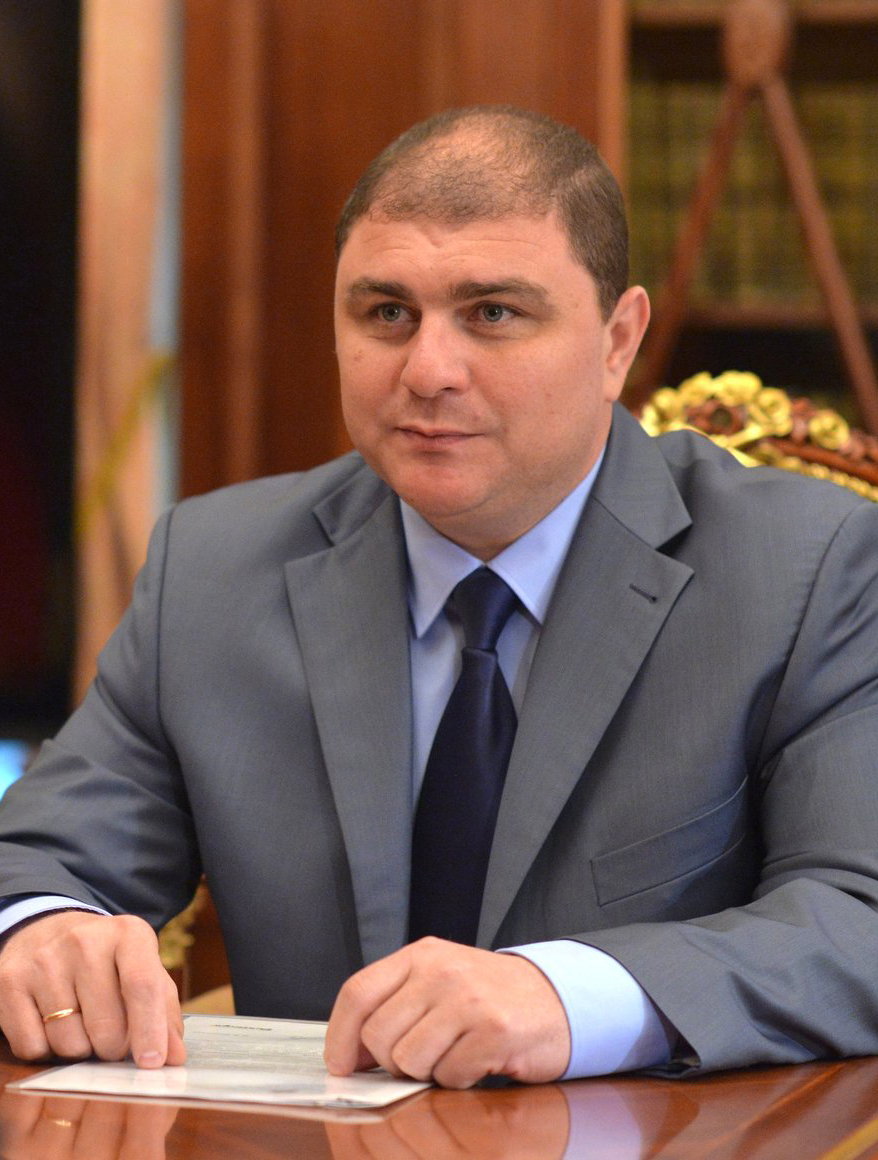
- Potomsky in 2015

Deputy Plenipotentiary Representative in the Northwestern Federal District
- Incumbent
- Assumed office 7 December 2018

Deputy Plenipotentiary Representative in the Central Federal District
- In office 5 October 2017 – 7 December 2018
- President: Vladimir Putin

4th Governor of Oryol Oblast
- In office 23 September 2017 – 5 October 2017
- Preceded by: Aleksandr Kozlov
- Succeeded by: Andrey Klychkov

Governor of Oryol Oblast (acting)
- In office 26 February 2014 – 23 September 2017

Member of the State Duma
- In office 4 December 2011 – 26 February 2014

Member of the Legislative Assembly of Leningrad Oblast
- In office March 2007 – 4 December 2011

Personal details
- Born: Vadim Vladimirovich Potomsky; 2 September 1972 (age 53) Mary, Turkmen SSR, Soviet Union
- Party: Communist Party
- Spouse: Natalya Rafayelevna
- Children: 3

Vadim Vladimirovich Potomsky (Russian: Вадим Владимирович Потомский; born 12 August 1972), is a Turkmen-Russian statesman, politician, and economist who is currently the Deputy Plenipotentiary Representative in the Northwestern Federal District since 7 December 2018. He had also served as the Deputy Plenipotentiary Representative in the Central Federal District from October 2017 to December 2018.

Potomsky also served as the fourth Governor of Oryol Oblast from 2014 to 2017. He is a member of the Central Committee of the Communist Party of the Russian Federation (KPRF) from the Leningrad regional branch of the party.

== Biography ==
Vadim Potomsky was born in Mary, Turkmen Soviet Socialist Republic, then part of the Soviet Union, on 12 August 1972, to his father, Vladimir Vikentievich, an army serviceman, and his mother, Natalia Artoyevna Bagdasarova, who had been a teacher. In 1993, he graduated from the Saint Petersburg Higher Anti-Aircraft Missile Command School (SPbVZRKU).

From 1993 to 1998, Potomsky served under contract in the Leningrad Military District. He was last ranked a lieutenant colonel; according to several media reports, the orders to confer the ranks of lieutenant colonel and major were cancelled as a result of a prosecutor's check in 2016.

From 1998 to 2000, Potomsky held various positions at the Analytical Center of the State Licensing Committee of the Government of the Leningrad Oblast. Between 2000 and 2006, he held the position of General Director of the municipal enterprise "Ecology" in Vsevolozhsk, Leningrad Oblast. In October 2005 he was elected a deputy of the Council of Deputies of the Vsevolozhskoye urban settlement. In 2006, he received a second higher education, graduating from the North-West Academy of Public Administration under the President of the Russian Federation with a degree in economics. From the same year he worked as the director of the municipal institution "Vsevolozhsk Municipal Management Company" of the MO "City of Vsevolozhsk".

In March 2007, Potomsky was elected a deputy of the Legislative Assembly of Leningrad Oblast's fourth convocation. He worked as the chairman of the standing commission on ecology and nature management, was a member of the standing commission on housing and communal services and the fuel and energy complex. He worked with voters of Vsevolozhsky, Volkhovsky, Kirovsky and Kirishsky districts of the region. In 2009, he was elected secretary of the Leningrad Regional Committee of the Communist Party of the Russian Federation.

On 4 December 2011, Potomksy was elected a member of parliament, a deputy of the State Duma of the VI convocation from the Communist Party of the Russian Federation (for a period until 5 October 2016). He is the first resident of the city of Vsevolozhsk to be elected a deputy of the State Duma. He became a member of the State Duma Committee on Housing and Communal Services. He is the initiator of the draft laws "On the creation of a system for financing capital repairs of apartment buildings."

In 2012, Potomksy was registered as a candidate from the Communist Party of the Russian Federation in the election of the governor of Bryansk Oblast. In this election, he received 31% of the popular vote and came second (out of two candidates).

On 26 February 2014, by decree of Russian President, Vladimir Putin, Potomksy was appointed the Acting Governor of Oryol Oblast. On 3 June of the same year, he headed the supervisory board of the football club FC Oryol, becoming its chairman. On 7 August 2014, he was registered as a candidate from the Communist Party of the Russian Federation in the election of the governor of Oryol Oblast. On 14 September 2014, Potomsky was elected the third governor of Oryol Oblast with a record number of votes (89%) and a high voter turnout. According to this indicator, he surpassed Yegor Stroyev in the 2001 elections, who gained 78% with a relatively low turnout.

On Potomsky's initiative in 2016, the first monument to Ivan the Terrible in Russia was erected in Oryol. At a press conference on 13 July 2016 in TASS's Moscow office, Potomsky suggested a new theory, that Ivan the Terrible's son, Tsarevich Ivan Ivanovich, was not killed by his father, but died while travelling between Moscow and Saint Petersburg.

On 5 October 2017, by decree of the President Putin, Potomsky was relieved ahead of schedule of his post as governor of Oryol Oblast at his own request. On the same day, he was appointed Deputy Plenipotentiary Representative in the Central Federal District, serving under Alexander Beglov. In this position, he oversaw work with industrial enterprises and nuclear power plants, and also tackled problems related to the activities of landfills. On 7 March 2018, by the decree of the President Putin, he was awarded the class rank of the 3rd class Active State Councilor of the Russian Federation.

On 7 December 2018, Potomsky was appointed Deputy Plenipotentiary Representative of the President in the Northwestern Federal District.

== Family ==
Potomsky is married to Natalya Rafayelevna, and they have two daughters, Ilona and Eleanor, and a son, Vladislav.
