= Vladimir Krugly =

Russian politician (born 1955)

- Владимир Круглый
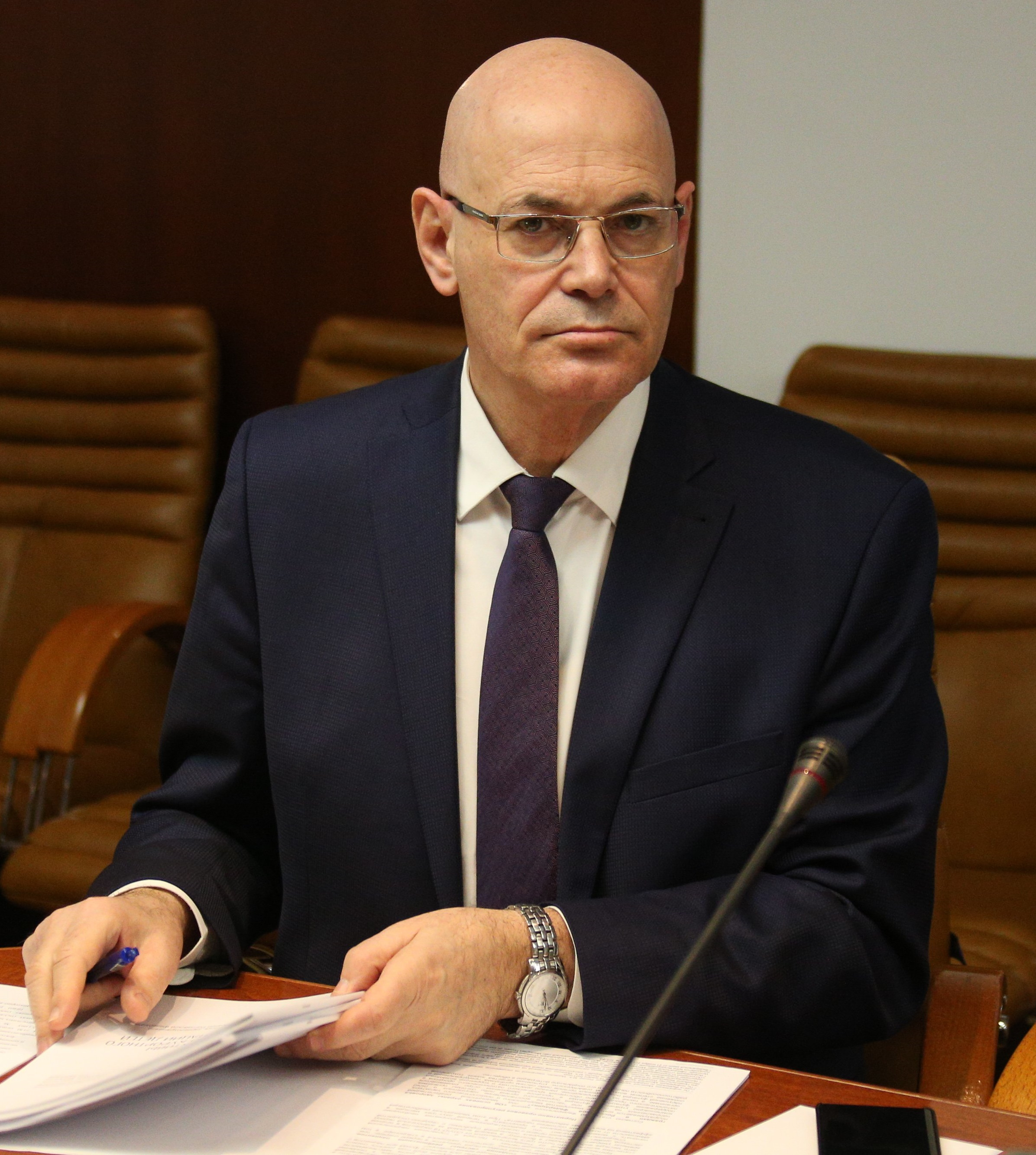

Senator from Oryol Oblast
- Incumbent
- Assumed office 24 September 2014
- Preceded by: Yegor Stroyev

Personal details
- Born: Vladimir Krugly; 27 May 1955 (age 71) Oryol, Oryol Oblast, Russian Soviet Federative Socialist Republic, Soviet Union
- Party: United Russia
- Education: Kursk State Medical University

Vladimir Igorevich Krugly (Russian: Владимир Игоревич Круглый; born 27 May 1955) is a Russian politician serving as a senator from Oryol Oblast since 24 September 2014.

== Career ==
Vladimir Krugly was born on 27 May 1955 in Oryol, Oryol Oblast. In 1978, he graduated from the Kursk State Medical University. After graduation, Krugly started working as a child surgeon at the hospital in Oryol. From 2010 to 2013, he served as a chief physician of the hospital. On 24 September 2014, he became the senator from Oryol Oblast.

== Sanctions ==
Vladimir Krugly is under personal sanctions introduced by the European Union, the United Kingdom, the United States, Canada, Switzerland, Australia, Ukraine, New Zealand, for ratifying the decisions of the "Treaty of Friendship, Cooperation and Mutual Assistance between 49ers the Russian Federation and the Donetsk People's Republic and between the Russian Federation and the Luhansk People's Republic" and providing political and economic support for Russia's annexation of Ukrainian territories.
