= Spasskoye-Lutovinovo =

Childhood home of Ivan Turgenev

- Спасское-Лутовиново
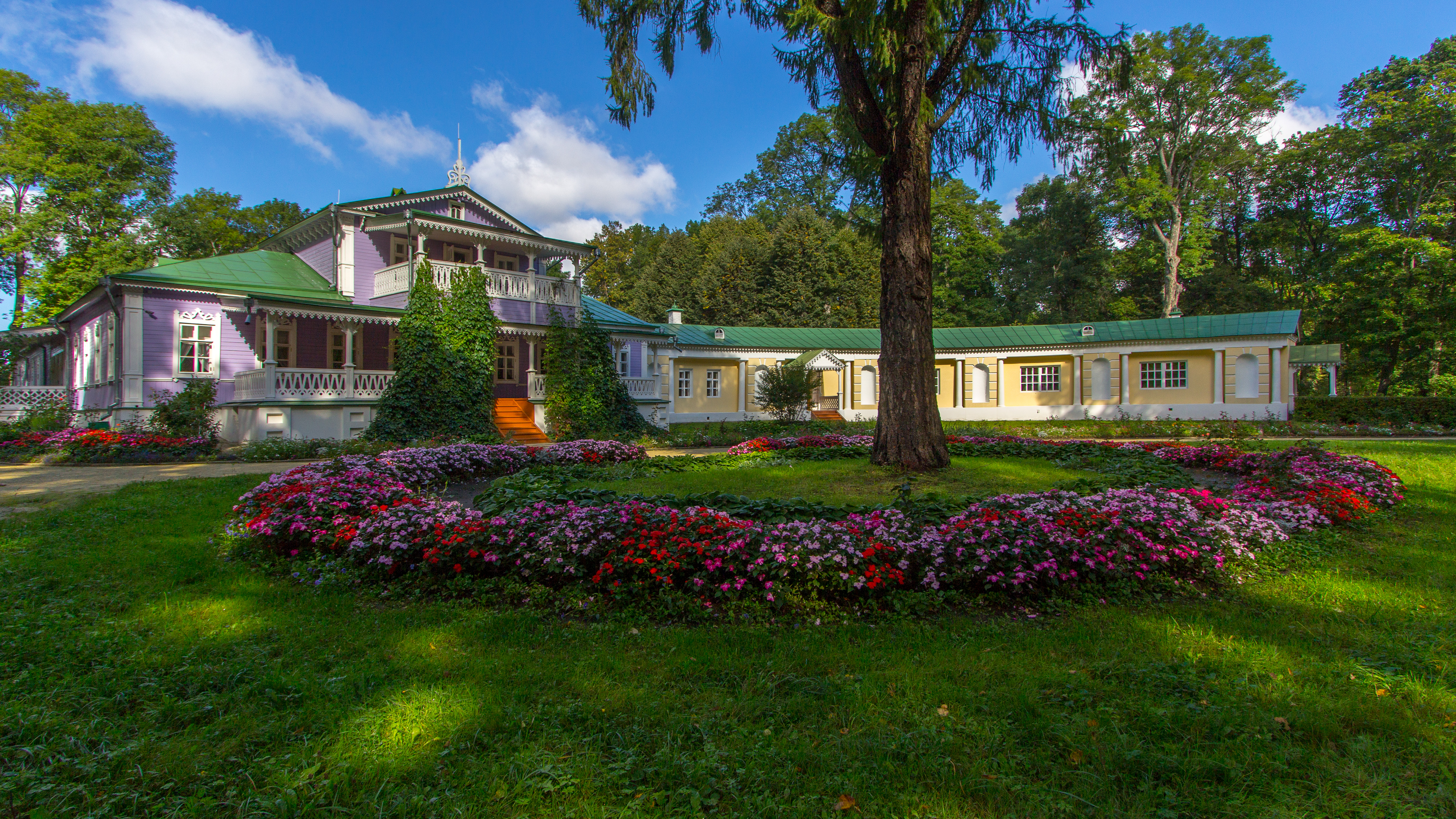
- Spasskoye-Lutovinovo

- Location in Oryol Oblast

General information
- Type: Estate house
- Location: Near Mtsensk, Oryol Oblast, Russia
- Coordinates: 53.373710°N 36.633695°E
- Construction started: 1778
- Completed: 1809
- Renovated: 1839 (rebuilt after fire)
- Owner: Museum-reserve

Spasskoye-Lutovinovo (Russian: Спасское-Лутовиново) was the childhood estate of Russian writer Ivan Turgenev, which he inherited after his mother's death. It is situated 10 km north of Mtsensk, near Oryol. The house was built in 1778-1809, but was partially destroyed by a fire in May 1839. It was rebuilt in a simpler style.

The estate is now a museum and a natural reserve, open to tourists and visitors. It is designated as an object of Russian cultural heritage of federal significance.
