= Andrey Klychkov =

Russian lawyer and politician (born 1980)

- Андрей Клычков
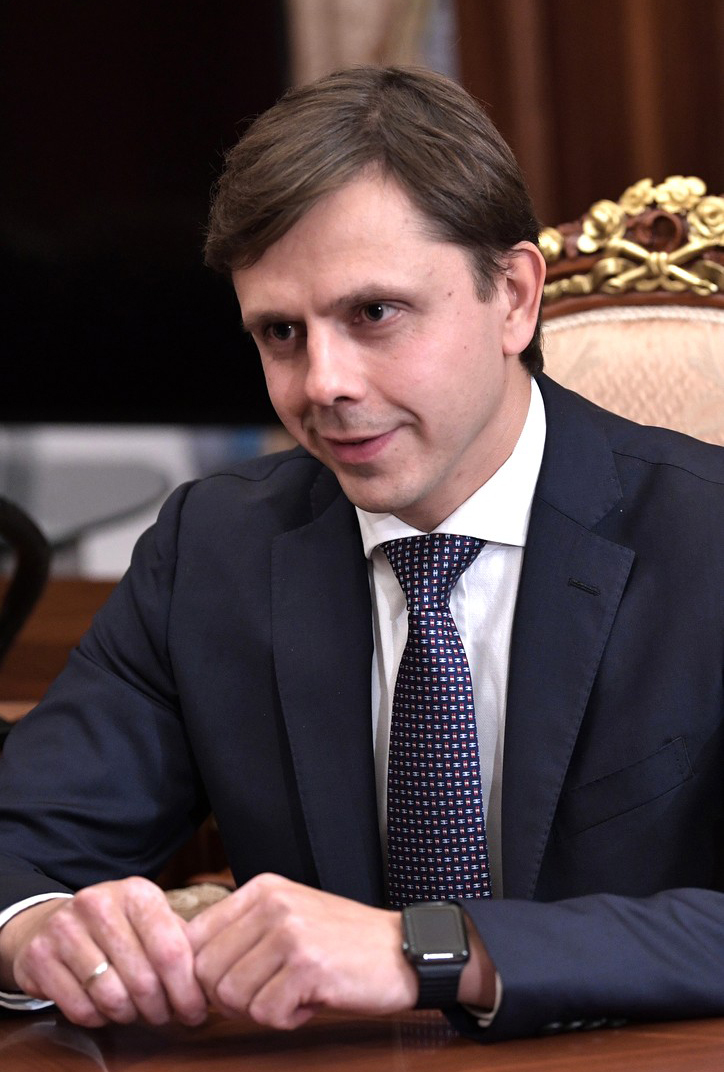
- Klychkov in 2017

5th Governor of Oryol Oblast
- Incumbent
- Assumed office 5 October 2017
- President: Vladimir Putin
- Preceded by: Vadim Potomsky

Deputy of the Moscow City Duma
- In office 11 October 2009 – 5 October 2017

Personal details
- Born: Andrey Yevgenyevich Klychkov; 2 September 1979 (age 46) Kaliningrad, Russian SFSR, Soviet Union
- Party: Communist Party
- Spouse: Valeria Klychkova
- Children: 2

Andrey Yevgenyevich Klychkov (Russian: Андрей Евгеньевич Клычков; born 2 September 1979), is a Russian state and political figure, and a lawyer. He is currently serving as the Governor of Oryol Oblast since 5 October 2017. Previously he was a Deputy of the Moscow City Duma.

== Biography ==
Andrey Klychkov was born in Kaliningrad on 2 September 1979. In his youth, he was engaged in pentathlon.

In 2000 he graduated from the Kaliningrad Law Institute of the Ministry of Internal Affairs of Russia (now a branch of the St. Petersburg University of the Ministry of Internal Affairs of Russia), majoring in "jurisprudence". After graduation, he worked for two years in the criminal investigation of the criminal police in Kaliningrad.

In July 2001 he joined the Communist Party of the Russian Federation. He worked with the appeals of citizens in the party's public reception hall, held the post of assistant legal adviser, and went to the deputy head of the Legal Service of the Central Committee of the Communist Party.

He represented the interests of the Communist Party in the Central Election Commission and the Supreme Court of Russia. He was an assistant to the deputy of the State Duma, a member of the Communist Party faction Anatoly Lokotya.

In 2004, he graduated from the Russian University of Innovation with a degree in political science. On March 12, 2006, he participated in the election of deputies of the Kaliningrad Oblast Duma of the IV convocation from the Communist Party, was part of the regional group "Soviet", but did not go to parliament. Later, he occupied the posts of a referent, a senior referent of the apparatus of the Communist Party faction in the State Duma.

December 2, 2007, Klychkov participated in the elections to the State Duma of the V convocation on the party list of the Communist Party (the second number in the regional group No. 52, Nizhny Novgorod Oblast), but was not elected.

From 2007 to 2009 he was a member of the CEC of Russia. In 2008 he graduated from the full-time department of the Diplomatic Academy of the Ministry of Foreign Affairs of Russia, specializing in "international relations".

In October 2008 at the XIII Congress of the Communist Party, Klychkov was elected a member of the central committee of the party. And later, in particular, at the XVII Congress on May 27, 2017, he was repeatedly re-elected.

October 11, 2009, Andrey Klychkov was elected to the Moscow City Duma of the V convocation on the list of the Communist Party, and was part of the citywide part of the list, headed the regional group number 14. In the capital's parliament, Klychkov headed the Communist Party faction. In December 2011, he was elected to the State Duma of the Russian Federation VI. However, he refused the mandate, remaining a deputy of the Moscow City Duma. Vladimir Rodin took his place in the Russian parliament.

He was reelected to the Moscow City Duma in the elections held on September 14, 2014. He ran for the single-mandate constituency No. 21 (part of the Vykhino-Zhulebino district and the Ryazan district), bypassed the candidate from the United Russia party, Vladimir Zotov (32.16%), and was elected to the sixth convocation.

In the Moscow City Duma he was the head of the Communist Party faction, he also headed the commission on affairs of public associations and religious organizations. He was a member of the commissions for urban development, state property and land use; by legislation, regulations, rules and procedures; a joint commission of the Moscow City Duma and the Moscow Oblast Duma on the coordination of legislative work on urban economy and housing policy. In the system of the Communist Party Klychkov from February 24, 2014, he was a member of the Presidium of the Central Committee of the Communist Party. On May 27, 2017, he was promoted secretary of the Communist Party. He is also the secretary of the Moscow City Committee of the Communist Party of the Russian Federation, and besides this, the adviser of the chairman of the Central Committee Gennady Zyuganov. In September 2016, Klychkov ran for the State Duma of the Russian Federation VI, but again he did not receive a deputy mandate. In early 2017, the politician said that he intends to participate in the election of the Mayor of Moscow in 2018.

On October 5, 2017, by presidential decree, Vladimir Putin appointed Klychkov as the acting governor of Oryol Oblast. Klychkov himself said that for him the offer to occupy this post was to some extent unexpected. "This supplement is valuable, which, perhaps, was not enough. I regard this issue not as leaving Moscow, trying to quit it, but as an additional challenge, which I will try to implement, "he stressed.

In response to the Russian invasion of Ukraine, the Office of Foreign Assets Control of the United States Department of the Treasury added Klychkov to the Specially Designated Nationals and Blocked Persons List on 24 February 2023, which results in his assets being frozen and U.S. persons being prohibited from dealing with him. He was also sanctioned by the European Union on 24 June 2024 for being "involved in the illegal deportation of Ukrainian children to Russia".

== Personal life ==
=== Family ===
Andrei Klychkov's parents are graduates of the Kaliningrad Technical Institute of the Fishing Industry and the Economy.

His father, Yevgeny Klychkov, served as first secretary of the Central District Committee of the Komsomol of Kaliningrad, secretary for propaganda and agitation at the Komsomol Regional Committee Bureau; worked at the Kaliningrad base of expedition fishing as a fish processing master, assistant captain for the production of fishing industry fleet on ships.

His mother, Elena Klychkova, worked at the Scientific Research Institute of Fisheries, where she was engaged in scientific and teaching activities.

Klychkov is married, and the father of two sons of 2008 and 2015 of birth. His wife - Valeria, graduated from the Moscow Aviation Institute.

=== Property and income ===
According to open data, the amount of declared income Klychkov for 2016 amounted to 512.6 thousand rubles, and 116 thousand rubles for his wife. In the use of Klychkova is an apartment of 54.5 square meters, he owns the all-wheel drive vehicle-conveyor LuAZ-967.
