= Yegor Stroyev =

Russian politician (born 1937)

- Егор Строев
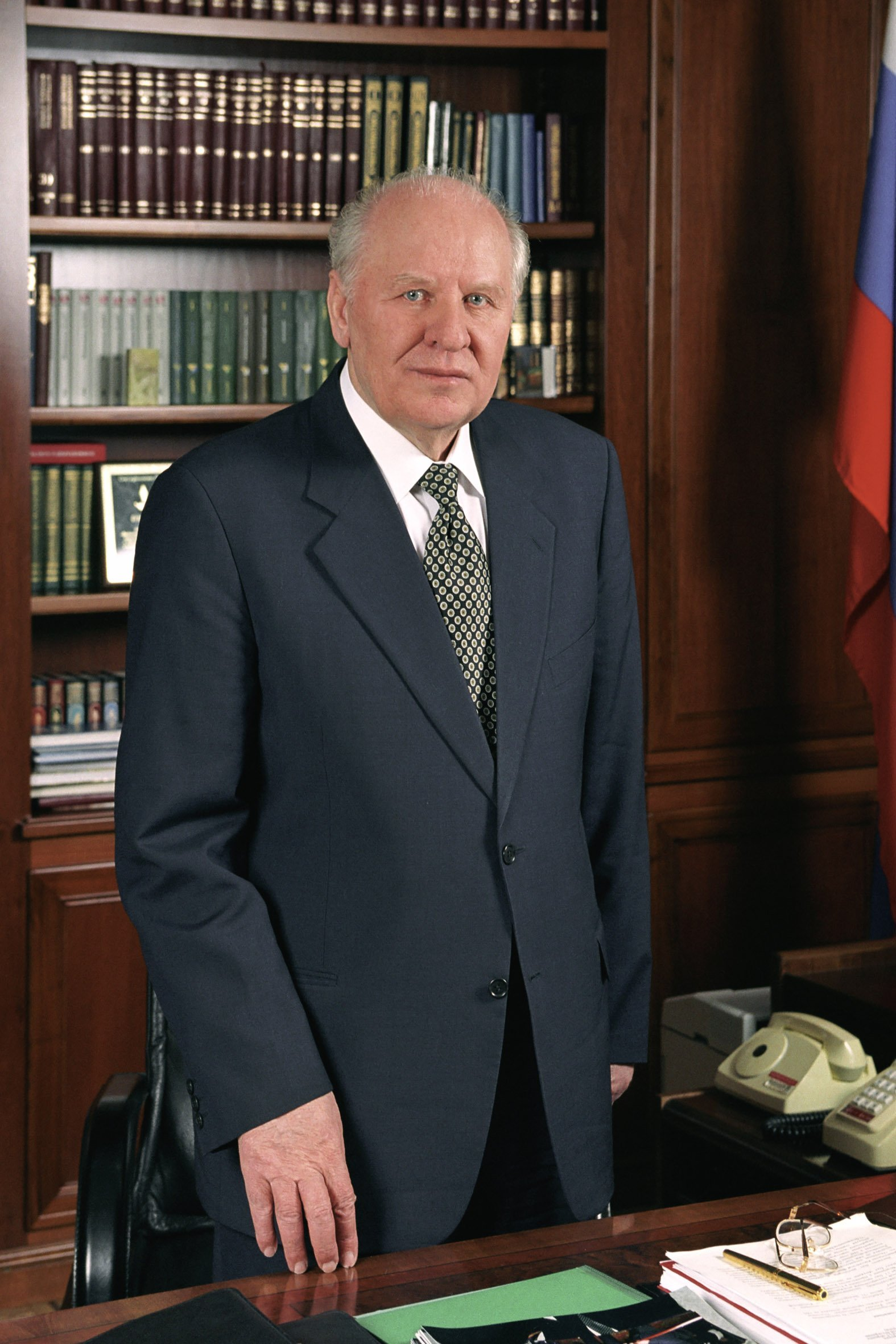
- Official portrait, 1996

2nd Chairman of the Federation Council
- In office 23 January 1996 – 5 December 2001
- President: Boris Yeltsin; Vladimir Putin
- Preceded by: Vladimir Shumeyko
- Succeeded by: Sergey Mironov

Russian Federation Senator from Oryol Oblast
- In office 25 March 2009 – 24 September 2014
- Preceded by: Marina Rogacheva
- Succeeded by: Vladimir Krugly

2nd Governor of Oryol Oblast
- In office 11 May 1993 – 16 February 2009
- Preceded by: Nikolay Yudin
- Succeeded by: Aleksandr Kozlov

Personal details
- Born: 25 February 1937 (age 89) Dudkino, Oryol Oblast, Russian SFSR, Soviet Union
- Party: United Russia (2005–present)
- Other political affiliations: CPSU (1958–1991)

Yegor Semyonovich Stroyev (Russian: Его́р Семёнович Стро́ев; born 25 February 1937) is a Russian politician and statesman who served as chairman of the Federation Council of Russia between 1996 and 2001. Previously, he was governor of Oryol Oblast from 1993 to 2009. He had a major post in the Communist Party of the Soviet Union. Stroyev was reelected as governor with a very large majority. He was removed from his position on 16 February 2009, by Dmitry Medvedev due to economic concerns.

His daughter Marina Rogacheva is also a Russian politician.

== Honours and awards ==
- Order of Merit for the Fatherland;
  - 1st class (5 December 2001) - for outstanding contribution to the strengthening and development of Russian statehood and parliamentarianism
  - 2nd class (20 February 1997) - for services to the state, great personal contribution to the development of Russian parliamentarianism and strengthen friendship and cooperation between nations
  - 3rd class (2 May 1996) - for great personal contribution to economic reform and development of the state
  - 4th class (25 February 2007) - for services to the state, a large contribution to the socio-economic development of the field and many years of diligent work
- Order of the October Revolution
- Order of the Red Banner of Labour
- Badge of Honor (Order) "Sports Glory of Russia", 1st class (newspaper Komsomolskaya Pravda and the board of the Russian Olympic Committee)
- Diploma of the President of the Russian Federation (12 December 2008) - for active participation in the drafting of the Constitution and a great contribution to the democratic foundations of the Russian Federation
- Order of Friendship (Vietnam)
