= Oryol Oblast Council of People's Deputies =

Regional parliament of Oryol Oblast, Russia

Oryol Oblast Council of People's Deputies Орловский областной Совет народных депутатов
- 8th legislature

Type
- Type: Unicameral

Leadership
- Chairman: Leonid Muzalevsky, United Russia since 16 December 2012

Structure
- Seats: 50
- Political groups: United Russia (28); CPRF (13); A Just Russia (5); LDPR (2); New People (2)

Elections
- Voting system: Mixed
- Last election: 20 September 2026
- Next election: 2031

Meeting place
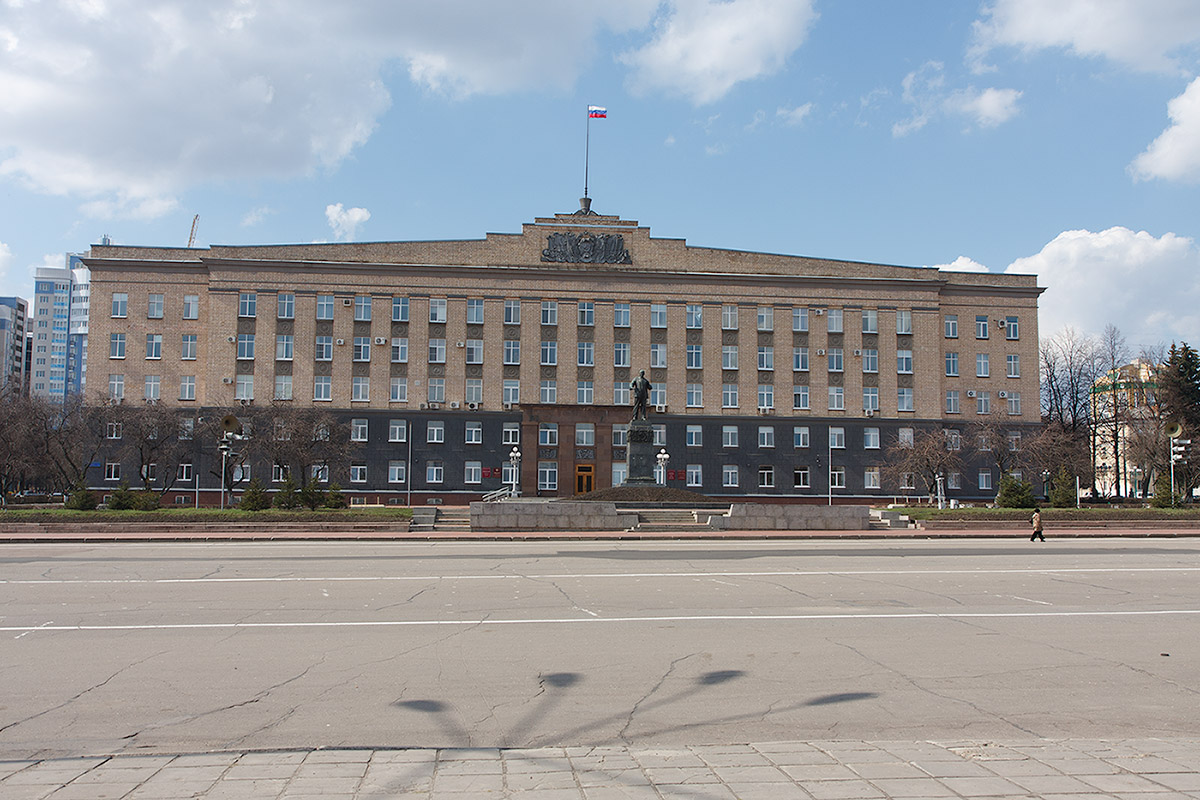
- 1 Lenin Square, Oryol

Website
- oreloblsovet.ru

The Oryol Oblast Council of People's Deputies (Russian: Орловский областной Совет народных депутатов) is the regional parliament of Oryol Oblast, a federal subject of Russia.

The council consists of 50 deputies elected for a term of five years.

== Elections ==
=== 2021 ===
Party	%	Seats
United Russia	37.05	27
Communist Party of the Russian Federation	21.80	11
A Just Russia — For Truth	12.75	6
Liberal Democratic Party of Russia	9.94	3
New People	6.62	1
Party of Pensioners	5.81	1
Self-nominated	—	1
Registered voters/turnout	49.13	
