= Oryol Oblast =

First-level administrative division of Russia

Oryol Oblast Орловская область (Russian)
- Oblast
- Flag Coat of arms

- Coordinates: 52°51′N 36°26′E
- Country: Russia
- Federal district: Central
- Economic region: Central
- Established: September 27, 1937
- Administrative center: Oryol

Government
  - Body: Oblast Council of People's Deputies
  - Governor: Andrey Klychkov

Area
  - Total: 24,652 km^{2} (9,518 sq mi)
  - Rank: 71st

Population (2021 census)
  - Total: 713,374
  - Estimate (2018): 747,247
  - Rank: 62nd
  - Density: 28.938/km^{2} (74.948/sq mi)
  - Urban: 66.6%
  - Rural: 33.4%

GDP (nominal, 2024)
  - Total: ₽441 billion (US$5.17 billion)
  - Per capita: ₽639,833 (US$7,507.93)
- Time zone: UTC+3 (MSK)
- ISO 3166 code: RU-ORL
- License plates: 57
- OKTMO ID: 54000000
- Official languages: Russian
- Website: http://www.adm.orel.ru/

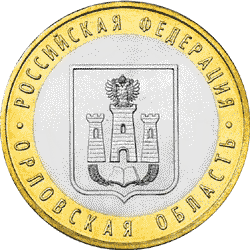
Commemorative coin of the Bank of Russia with a face value of 10 rubles (2005)

Oryol Oblast, (Note: Russian: Орло́вская о́бласть, romanized: Orlovskaya oblastʹ) also known as Orlovshchina, (Note: Russian: Орловщина) is a federal subject of Russia (an oblast). Its administrative center is the city of Oryol. As of the 2021 census, Oryol Oblast had a population of 713,374.

== Geography ==
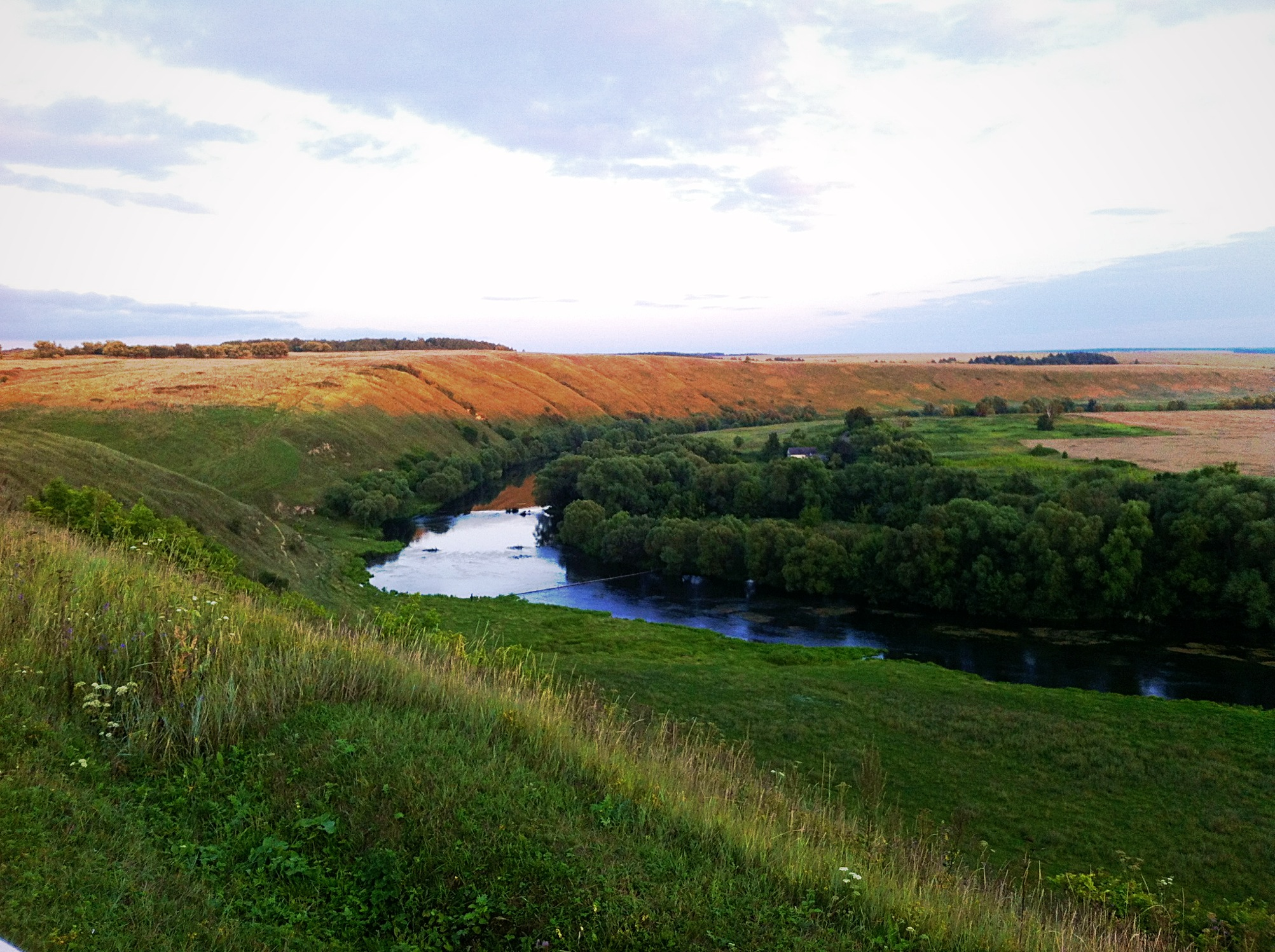
Landscape of the eastern part of the region

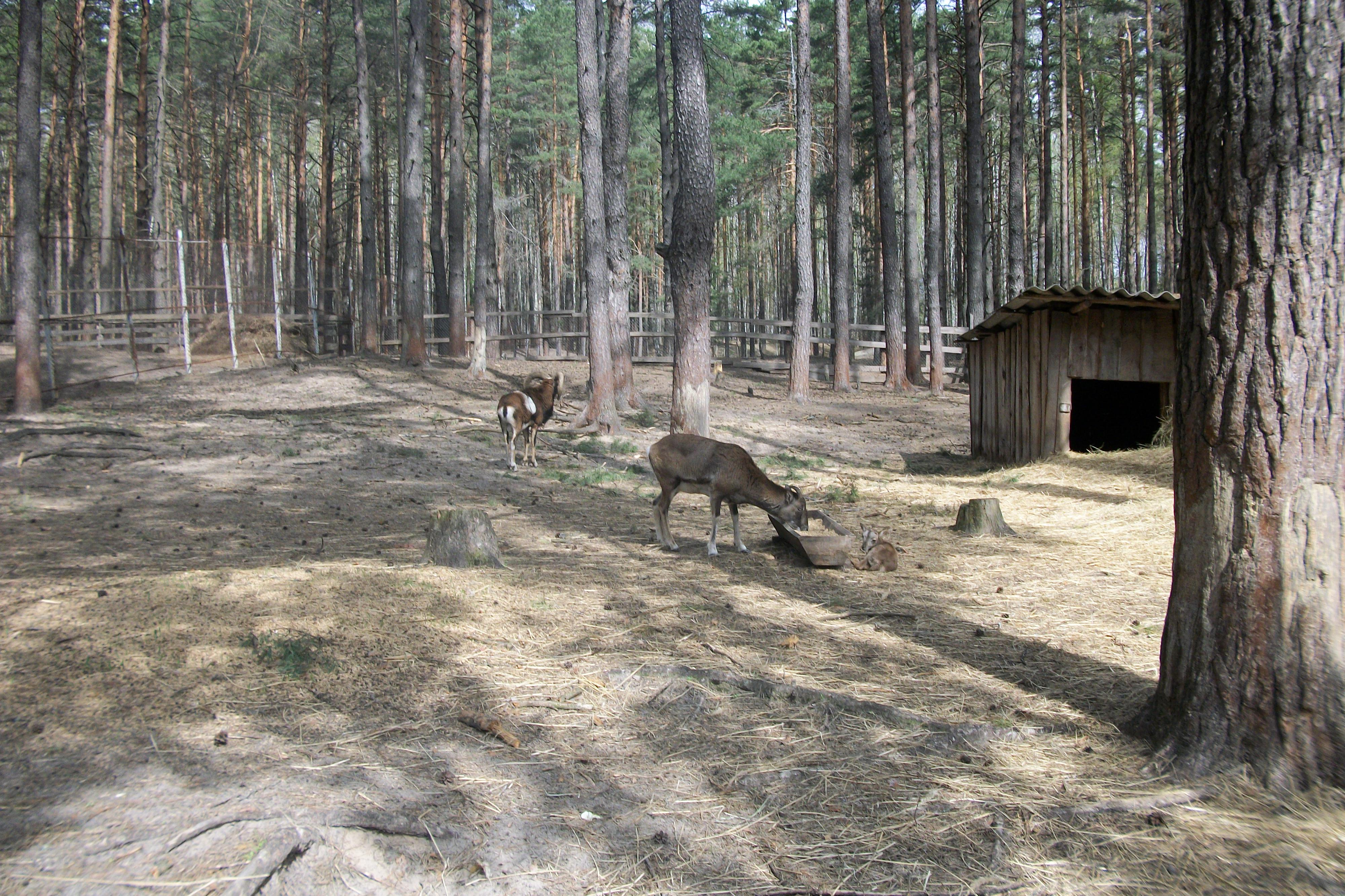
In the national park Orlovskoye Polesye

It is located in the southwestern part of the Central Federal District, in the Central Russian Upland.

In terms of area, at 24,652 km^{2} (9,518 sq mi) it is one of the smallest federal subjects. From north to south, it extends for more than 150 km (93 mi), and from west to east—for over 200 km (120 mi).

It borders Kaluga Oblast to the north-west, Tula Oblast to the north, Lipetsk Oblast to the east, Kursk Oblast to the south, and Bryansk Oblast to the west.

There are 4,800 km^{2} (1,900 sq mi) of black earth soils (chernozems) in the oblast, which amounts to three-quarters of the world chernozem reserves.

=== Climate ===
The climate is temperate (Köppen: Dfb). The winter is moderately cold, with an average January temperature from −9 to −11 °C (16 to 12 °F). Summers are warm and humid, with an average July temperature from 19 to 21 °C (66 to 70 °F). Rainfall averages 520 to 630 mm (20 to 25 in), and snow cover averages 120 days.

=== Hydrography ===
On the territory of the Oryol region there are more than 2 thousand rivers and streams with a total length of 9,100 km (5,700 mi), but there are no navigable water ways. The rivers of the region belong to the basins of three rivers: Volga, Don, Dnieper.

The Oka river, one of Europe's largest rivers, flows through the oblast for part of its course (190 km) and the source of it is in the south of the region. Main tributaries: Zusha (with tributary Neruch), Vytebet, Nugr, Tson, Orlik, Rybnitsa, Kroma.

Sosna flows in the eastern part of the region. Main tributaries: Trudy, Tim, Lyubovsha, Kshen, Olym.

In the west of the region originate rivers Nerussa, Navlya, Swapa.

1100 lakes and artificial reservoirs of the region cover a total area of about 55 km^{2} (21 sq mi) (0,22%).

== History ==
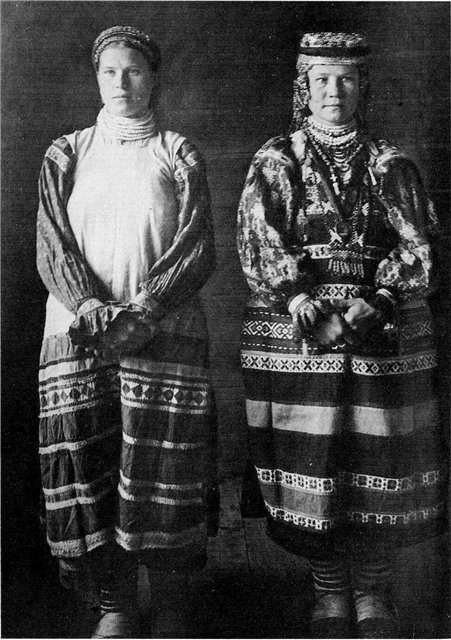
Outfits of the Oryol province, 1908

In the 12th century, chronicles mention Mtsensk, known as Novosil then. Then modern Orlovschina was part of the Chernigov Principality. After the death of Mikhail of Chernigov Novosil Principality was formed on these territories. By the end of the 15th century, it had disintegrated into four separate principalities and, along with all the other fragments of the Chernigov principality, became a part of Grand Duchy of Lithuania. In the 16th century, the fortress town of Oryol was founded, and the town of Livny, destroyed in the 13th century, was restored. In the 16th and 17th centuries, the territory of modern Oryol was the borderland of the Tsardom of Russia, with many fortifications of the Great Abatis Line. With the reduction of the threat posed by the Tatars, agricultural activity of the area had intensified. It was created in 1937 by uniting a selection of territories of three other oblasts: Kursk Oblast, Western Oblast, and Voronezh Oblast. It also included present Bryansk Oblast between 1937 and 1944. In 1941-3 The Region was partly or fully occupied by Germany.

== Politics ==
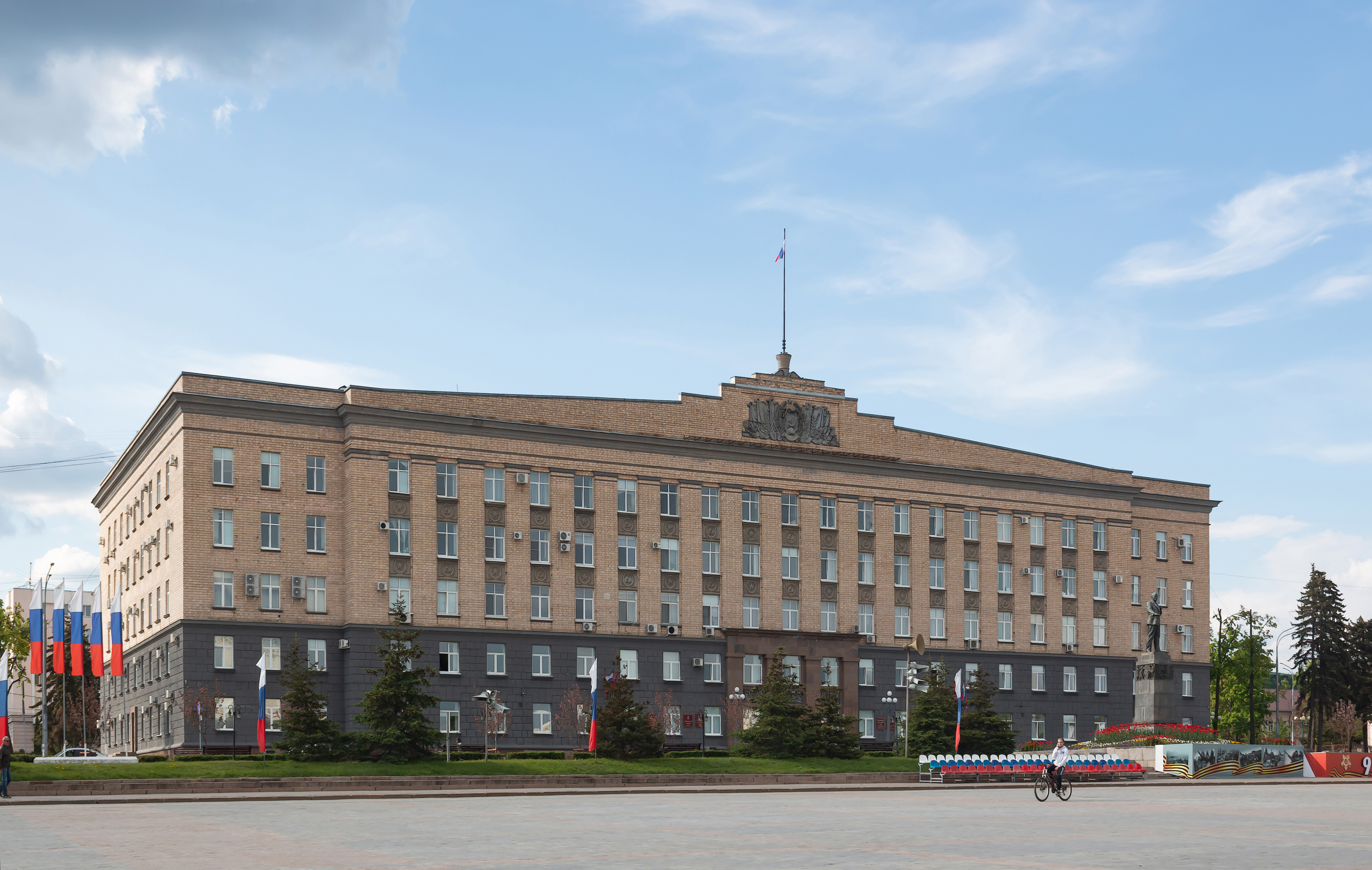
The House of Soviets in Oryol on Lenin Square is the building of the Council of People's Deputies and the government of the Oryol Oblast

During the Soviet period, the high authority in the oblast was shared between three persons: The first secretary of the Oryol CPSU Committee (who in reality had the biggest authority), the chairman of the oblast Soviet (legislative power), and the Chairman of the oblast Executive Committee (executive power). Since 1991, CPSU lost all the power, and the head of the Oblast administration, and eventually the governor was appointed/elected alongside elected regional parliament.

The Charter of Oryol Oblast is the fundamental law of the region. The Oryol Oblast Council of People's Deputies is the province's standing legislative (representative) body. The Legislative Assembly exercises its authority by passing laws, resolutions, and other legal acts and by supervising the implementation and observance of the laws and other legal acts passed by it. The highest executive body is the Oblast Government, which includes territorial executive bodies such as district administrations, committees, and commissions that facilitate development and run the day to day matters of the province. The Oblast administration supports the activities of the Governor of Oryol Oblast, who is the highest official and acts as guarantor of the observance of the oblast Charter in accordance with the Constitution of Russia.

The head of administration of Oryol Oblast between 1993 and 2009 was Yegor Stroyev. Stroyev led the region for more than 20 years. In 1985 he became the first secretary of the regional committee of the CPSU, and after three years (in 1989-1991 he worked as secretary of the Central Committee of the CPSU), in 1991 he returned to Oryol, worked as the director of the Institute of Horticultural Crops Selection, and later was elected governor. On February 16, 2009 Russian President Dmitry Medvedev accepted Stroyev's voluntary retirement and nominated Alexander Kozlov as his replacement, which was approved by the Oryol Regional Council of People's Deputies.

=== Legislature ===
The Oryol Oblast Council of People's Deputies is a permanent representative and legislative body of state power in the Oryol Oblast. It consists of 50 deputies elected by residents of the region for 5 year terms according to a mixed-member proportional representation: 25 deputies according to party lists (proportional representation) and 25 in single-mandate constituencies (majoritarian representation) on the basis of universal equal and direct suffrage by secret ballot.

The current 7th Council of People's Deputies was elected in the 2021 Russian regional elections and will last until 2026. Of the 50 deputies, 27 are from United Russia, 11 from the Communist Party of the Russian Federation, 6 from A Just Russia – For Truth, 3 from the Liberal Democratic Party of Russia, 1 from New People, 1 from the Russian Party of Pensioners for Social Justice, and 1 independent. Leonid Muzalevsky (United Russia) was elected Chairman of the Council.

== Administrative divisions ==
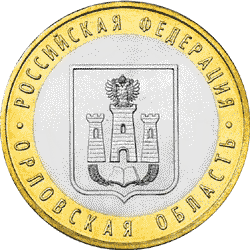
Reverse side of 2007 commemorative coin

- 3 cities under the oblast's jurisdiction
- 24 districts
  - 13 urban-type settlements
  - 223 rural settlements

== Economy ==
The main industries in Oryol Oblast are the food and light industries, engineering and metalworking, and ferrous and nonferrous metallurgy. The engineering and metalworking industries manufacture production equipment for various industries, forklift trucks, construction and agricultural equipment, and machinery for municipal services. Numerous companies in the instrument-making and electronics sectors maintain high scientific and technical potential with the latest high-end technologies and experienced specialists. First digital telephone exchange was introduced in the oblast in 1998.

=== Agriculture ===
Most of the oblast's agricultural land is used for plant cultivation. Grain growing is very important, with winter wheat and rye being the main crops. Buckwheat, oats, barley, and potatoes are also grown, and sugar beets are in great demand. The area planted in feed grains is increasing due to the expansion of livestock farming, which includes beef and dairy cattle farming, pig farming, sheep farming for meat and wool, poultry farming, and horse breeding.

== Transport ==
Pipelines and power transmission lines are routed through the region's largest oil-trunk pipeline Druzhba (202 km in area). In the southwestern part of the area lies a small section of the Urengoy - Pomary - Uzhgorod pipeline.

Oryol is a major hub of pipelines exporting to Belarus, Western Ukraine and the Baltic states, with branches passing through Bryansk and Kursk.

=== Automotive ===
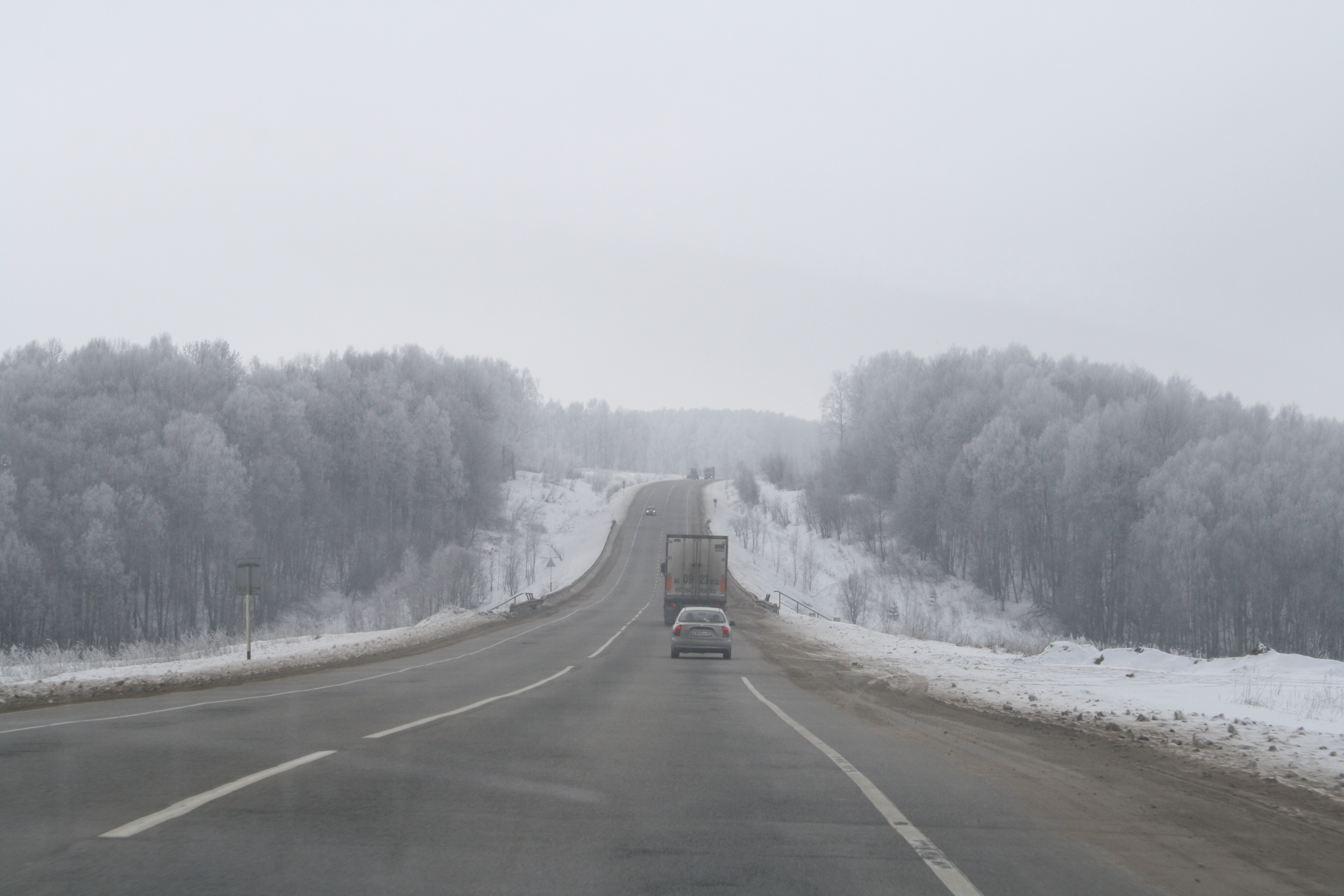
Road in winter

As of 2016, the motorization level of the area was of 314 cars per 1000 people, which is the 15th of any region of Russia and above the national average (285).

Main roads of the region:

- E105 / M 2 "Crimea" (152 km through Mtsensk, Oryol, Kromy, Trosna)
- R 119 Oryol — Tambov (151 km through Livny)
- R 120 Oryol — Vitebsk (57 km through Naryshkino)
- R 92 Kaluga — Oryol (67 km through Bolkhov)
- E391 / A 142 Trosna — Kalinovka (12 km)
- 54А-1 Oryol — Yefremov (158 km through Zalegoshch, Novosil)

=== Railway ===
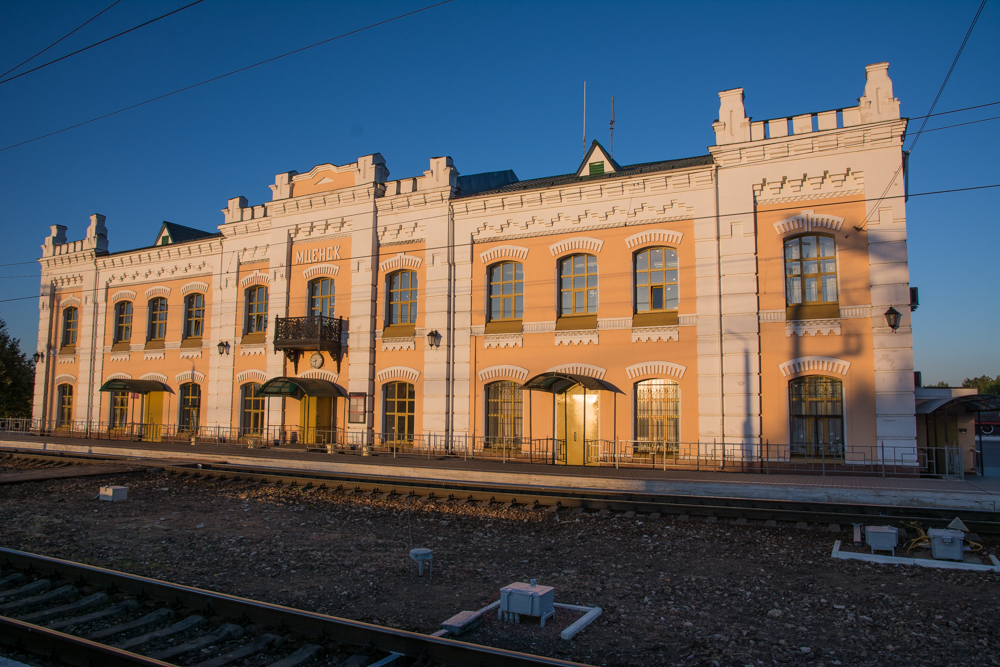
Railway station in Mtsensk

The main line is the double track electrified main line Moscow - Kharkiv - Simferopol (136 km through Mtsensk, Oryol, Zmievka and Glazunovka).

Other lines:

- Oryol — Yelets (130 km through Zalegoshch, Verkhovye, Khomutovo and Krasnaya Zarya)
  - branch in Livny and Dolgoye
- historical Riga — Oryol (64 km through Naryshkino and Khotynets)
- Oryol — Dmitriyev (83 km through Kromy)
- Kursk Oblast — Kolpna (20 km)

== Demographics ==
Historical population
Year	Pop.	±%
1897	2,033,798	—
1926	1,884,533	−7.3%
1959	929,013	−50.7%
1970	931,028	+0.2%
1979	892,505	−4.1%
1989	890,636	−0.2%
2002	860,262	−3.4%
2010	786,935	−8.5%
2021	713,374	−9.3%
2025	685,693	−3.9%
Source: Census data, estimate

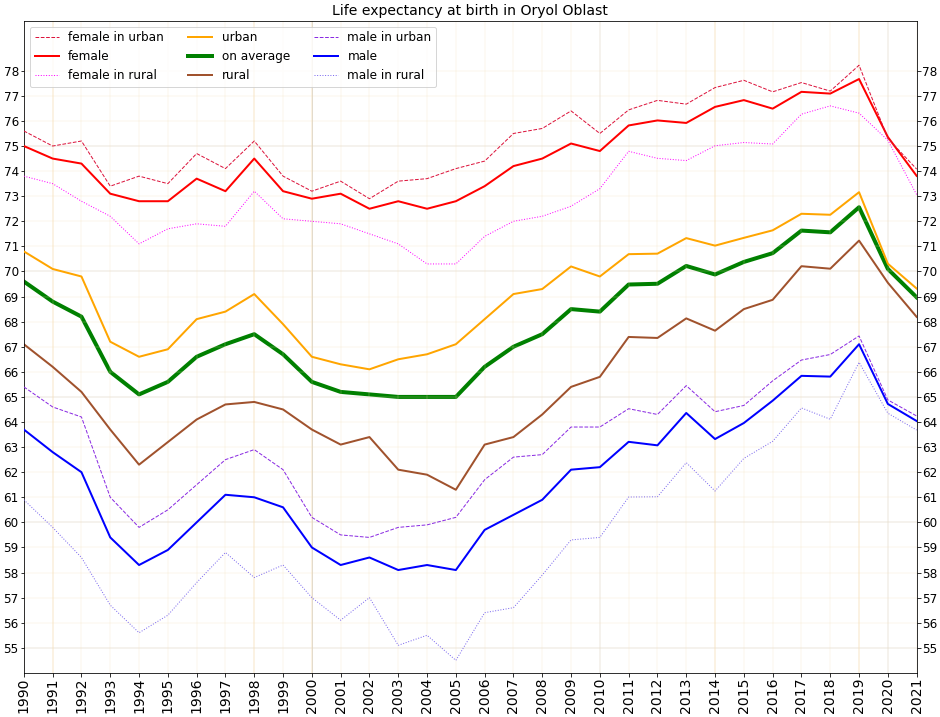
Life expectancy at birth in Oryol Oblast

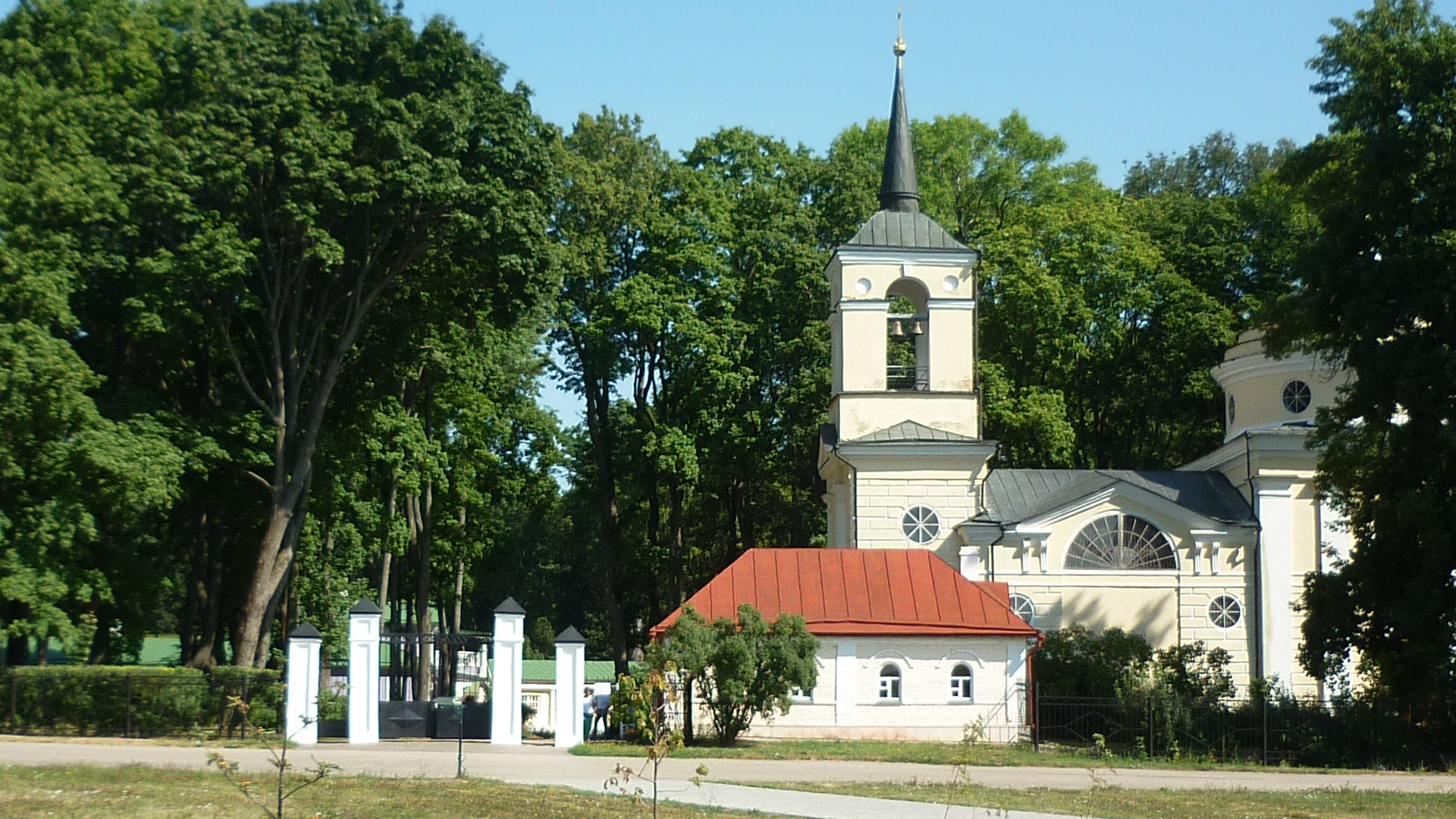
Spasskoe-Lutovinovo — estate of the Oryol writer Ivan Turgenev

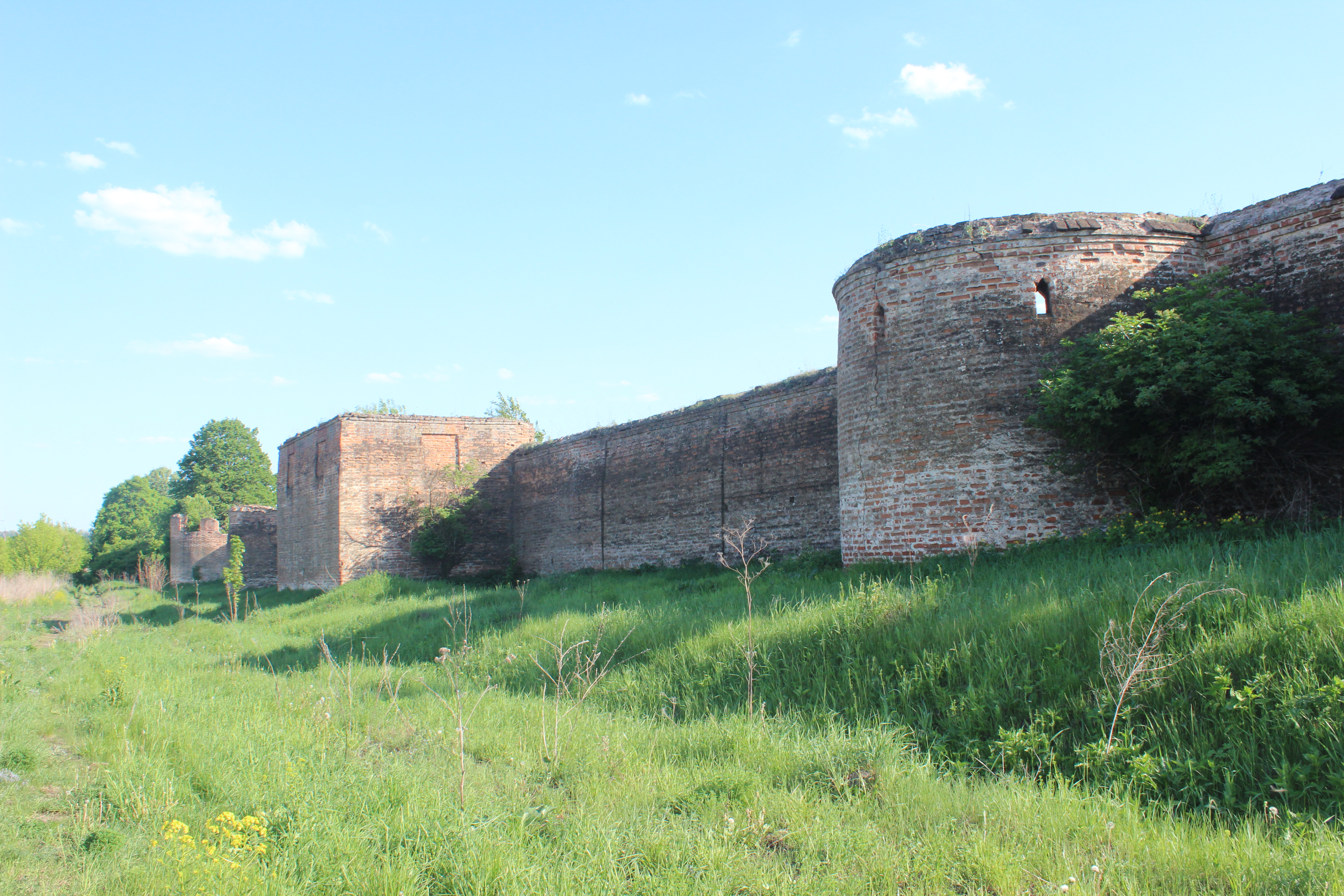
Walls of the Saburov fortress

Population: 713,374 (2021 census); 786,935 (2010 census); 860,262 (2002 census); 890,636 (1989 Soviet census).

Vital statistics for 2024:

- Births: 4,509 (6.5 per 1,000)
- Deaths: 10,978 (15.9 per 1,000)

Total fertility rate (2024):
1.18 children per woman

Life expectancy (2021):
Total — 68.97 years (male — 64.04, female — 73.81)

Ethnic composition (2010):

- Russians - 96.1%
- Ukrainians - 1%
- Others - 2.9%
- 17,468 people were registered from administrative databases, and could not declare an ethnicity. It is estimated that the proportion of ethnicities in this group is the same as that of the declared group.

Religion

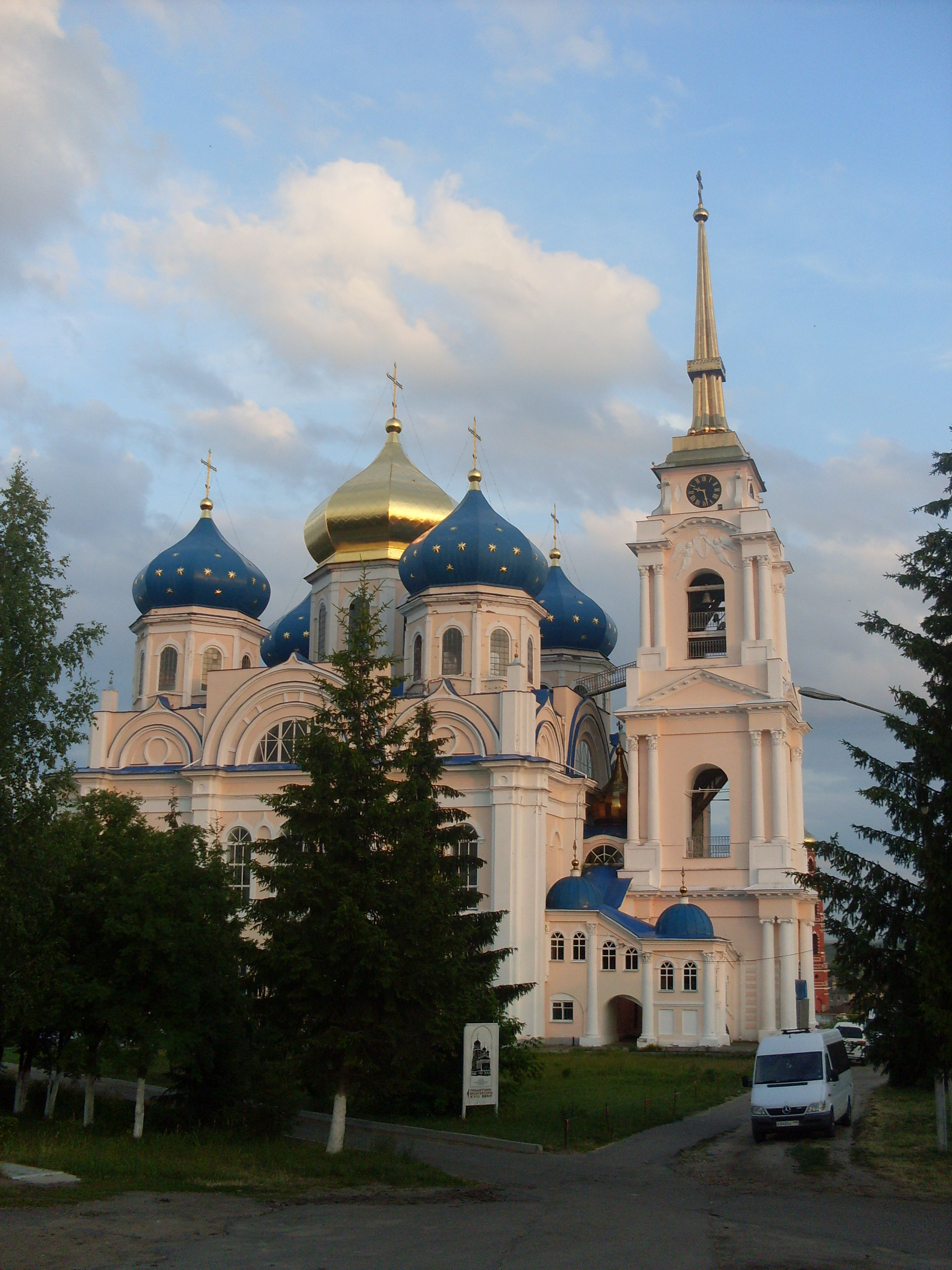
Cathedral in Bolkhov

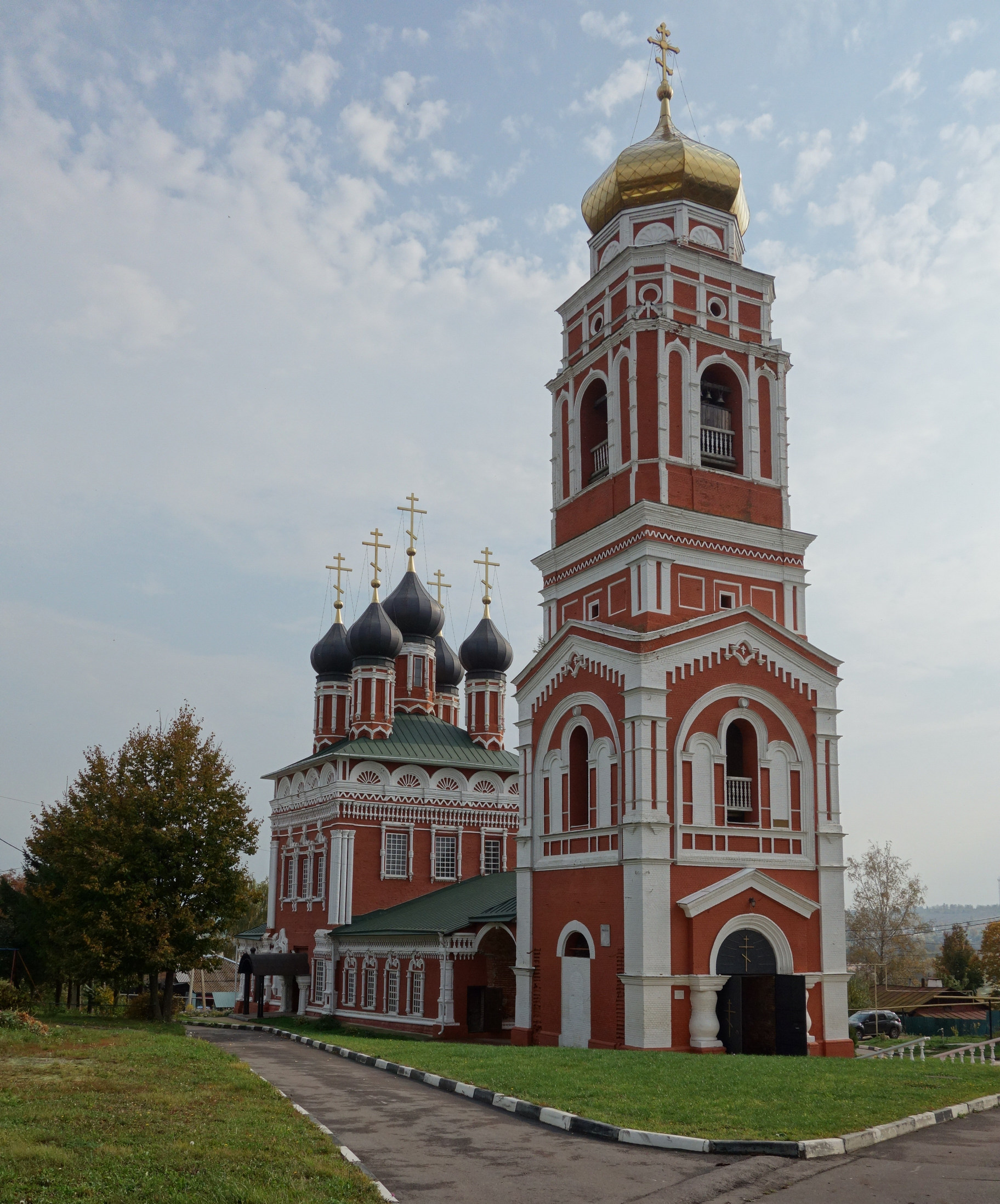
Trinity church in Bolkhov

Religion in Oryol Oblast as of 2012 (Sreda Arena Atlas)
Russian Orthodoxy	40.9%
Other Orthodox	1.4%
Old Believers	0.8%
Other Christians	5.8%
Rodnovery and other native faiths	0.6%
Spiritual but not religious	34.1%
Atheism and irreligion	8%
Other and undeclared	8.4%

According to a 2012 survey, 40.9% of the population of Oryol Oblast adheres to the Russian Orthodox Church, 5% are unaffiliated generic Christians, 1% are Orthodox Christian believers who don't belong to church or belong to non-Russian Orthodox churches, 1% are adherents of the Rodnovery (Slavic native faith) movement, and 1% are Old Believers. In addition, 34% of the population declares to be "spiritual but not religious", 8% is atheist, and 9.1% follows other religions or did not give an answer to the question.
