= 2019 Russian regional elections =

- 8 September 2019
- Gubernatorial Gubernatorial and legislative Legislative

The 2019 Russian regional elections took place on 8 September 2019 for the election of governors in 19 subjects, among which 16 by direct votes and 3 by indirect votes, and of legislatives bodies in 13 subjects.

== State Duma by-elections ==
=== Novgorod constituency ===
Candidate	Party	Votes	%
Yury Bobryshev	United Russia	40,293	36.94
Nina Ostanina	Communist Party	23,154	21.22
Dmitry Ignatov	A Just Russia	14,745	13.52
Anna Cherepanova	Yabloko	9,153	8.39
Alexey Chursinov	Liberal Democratic Party	7,366	6.75
Olga Yefimova	Communist Party of Social Justice	6,144	5.63
Alexander Grishin	Party of Pensioners	3,621	3.32
Dmitry Perevyazkin	Communists of Russia	2,483	2.28
Dmitry Tarasov	Party of Growth	2,131	1.95
Total		109,090	100.00

=== Komsomolsk-na-Amure constituency ===
Candidate	Party	Votes	%
Ivan Pilyaev	Liberal Democratic Party	65,596	41.54
Nikolay Platoshkin	Communist Party	41,398	26.22
Viktoria Tsyganova	United Russia	17,901	11.34
Tatyana Yaroslavtseva	A Just Russia	7,887	4.99
Nikolay Yevseenko	Party of Pensioners	5,637	3.57
Andrey Petrov	The Greens	5,167	3.27
Vladimir Titorenko	Communists of Russia	4,898	3.10
Vladimir Vorobyov	Rodina	3,420	2.17
Andrey Shvetsov	Party of Growth	3,020	1.91
Oleg Kotov	Patriots of Russia	2,989	1.89
Total		157,913	100.00

=== Serov constituency ===
Candidate	Party	Votes	%
Anton Shipulin	United Russia	46,015	43.41
Alexey Korovkin	A Just Russia	26,583	25.08
Gabbas Daudov	Communist Party	15,276	14.41
Yevgenia Chudnovets	Liberal Democratic Party	8,280	7.81
Irina Skachkova	Yabloko	3,999	3.77
Dmitry Zenov	Communists of Russia	3,700	3.49
Igor Ruzakov	The Greens	2,157	2.03
Total		106,010	100.00

=== Oryol constituency ===
Candidate	Party	Votes	%
Olga Pilipenko	United Russia	152,073	55.19
Ivan Dynkovich	Communist Party	45,303	16.44
Oleg Timokhin	Party of Pensioners	23,165	8.41
Ruslan Perelygin	A Just Russia	16,724	6.07
Roman Neverov	Liberal Democratic Party	12,929	4.69
Valery Chudo	Yabloko	10,169	3.69
Mikhail Orlov	Communists of Russia	9,909	3.60
Sergey Kuznetsov	Rodina	5,281	1.92
Total		275,553	100.00

== Gubernatorial elections ==
=== Direct election ===
- Altai Republic
- Astrakhan Oblast
- Bashkortostan Republic
- Chelyabinsk Oblast
- Kalmykia Republic
- Kurgan Oblast
- Kursk Oblast
- Lipetsk Oblast
- Murmansk Oblast
- Orenburg Oblast
- Saint Petersburg Federal City
- Sakhalin Oblast
- Stavropol Krai
- Volgograd Oblast
- Vologda Oblast
- Zabaykalsky Krai

=== Indirect election ===
- Crimea (20 September)
- Ingushetia
- Kabardino-Balkaria (3 October)

== Regional legislative elections ==
Party	Votes	%	Seats	+/–
United Russia	495,591	32.35	25	–13
Communist Party	499,643	32.62	13	+8
Yabloko	63,193	4.13	4	+4
A Just Russia	196,896	12.85	3	+3
Liberal Democratic Party	138,145	9.02	0	–1
Communists of Russia	79,062	5.16	0	0
Rodina	12,187	0.80	0	–1
The Greens	2,155	0.14	0	0
Civilian Power	1,945	0.13	0	0
Party of Growth	1,253	0.08	0	0
Independents	41,802	2.73	0	0
Total	1,531,872	100.00	45	0
Valid votes	1,531,872	96.28		
Invalid/blank votes	59,182	3.72		
Total votes	1,591,054	100.00		
Registered voters/turnout	7,308,469	21.77		

- Altai Republic State Assembly
- Bryansk Oblast Duma
- Crimea State Council
- Kabardino-Balkaria Parliament
- Karachay-Cherkessia People's Assembly
- Khabarovsk Krai Legislative Duma
- Mari El Republic State Assembly
- Sevastopol Legislative Assembly
- Tatarstan State Council
- Tula Oblast Duma
- Tuva Great Khural
- Volgograd Oblast Duma

=== By-Elections ===
- Altai Krai Legislative Assembly district 2
- Bashkortostan State Assembly districts 9, 16
- Chuvash Republic State Council district 16
- Kemerovo Oblast Council of People's Deputies district 9
- Khakassia Supreme Council districts 4, 9, 11, 19
- Khanty-Mansi Autonomous Okrug – Yugra Duma district 15
- Kostroma Oblast Duma district 8
- Krasnodar Krai Legislative Assembly district 15
- Krasnoyarsk Krai Legislative Assembly districts 2, 15
- Kursk Oblast Duma district 3
- Lipetsk Oblast Council of Deputies district 24
- Nenets Autonomous Okrug Assembly of Deputies district 8
- Nizhny Novgorod Oblast Legislative Assembly district 20
- Novgorod Oblast Duma district 1
- Omsk Oblast Legislative Assembly districts 4, 14, 19
- Orenburg Oblast Legislative Assembly district 3
- Primorsky Krai Legislative Assembly district 19
- Pskov Oblast Assembly of Deputies district 2
- Samara Regional Duma districts 11, 19
- Saratov Oblast Duma district 2
- Smolensk Oblast Duma district 24
- Sverdlovsk Oblast Legislative Assembly district 11
- Tomsk Oblast Legislative Duma districts 5, 16
- Tver Oblast Legislative Assembly district 19
- Tyumen Oblast Duma district 19
- Udmurtia State Council districts 7, 12
- Vologda Oblast Legislative Assembly district 13
- Yamalo-Nenets Autonomous Okrug Legislative Assembly district 8
- Zabaykalsky Krai Legislative Assembly district 20

== Municipal ==
- Saint Petersburg Municipal Councils

In Saint Petersburg's Chernaya Rechka municipal district, opposition candidate Pavel Chuprunov received a candidate certificate, but the election commission did not adopt a valid decision registering him and his name did not appear on the ballot. RFE/RL reported that opposition candidates in several Saint Petersburg districts faced queues of alleged sham candidates outside election commissions and police restrictions on access; Chuprunov said he had made repeated attempts to submit his papers. In January 2020, a court annulled the result in the five-seat constituency; a repeat election was held in September 2021.

== See also ==
- 2019 Moscow protests
