= By-elections to the 7th Russian State Duma =

By-elections to the 7th Russian State Duma were held to fill vacancies in the State Duma between the 2016 election and the 2021 election.

According to article 97 of the Federal Law "On elections of deputies of the State Duma", by-elections are appointed on the second Sunday of September (single voting day), but not less than 85 days before the day of voting. This means that if a vacant seat occurs before a single voting day, but less than 85 days before it, the election will be scheduled for next year. Also, by-elections are not appointed and are not held if, as a result of these elections, a Deputy cannot be elected for a term of more than one year before the end of the constitutional term for which the State Duma was elected.

The first by-elections were held on 10 September 2017, in two constituencies. The last by-elections were held on 13 September 2020, in four constituencies.

== Overview ==
By-election	Date	Former MP	Party	Winner	Party	Cause	Retained
Kingisepp	10 September 2017	Sergey Naryshkin	United Russia	Sergey Yakhnyuk	United Russia	New post	Yes
Bryansk	10 September 2017	Vladimir Zhutenkov	United Russia	Boris Paikin	Liberal Democratic Party	Resignation	No
Saratov	9 September 2018	Oleg Grishchenko	United Russia	Olga Alimova	Communist Party	Death	No
Zavolzhsky	9 September 2018	Vladimir Vasilyev	United Russia	Sergey Veremeenko	United Russia	New post	Yes
Balashov	9 September 2018	Mikhail Isayev	United Russia	Yevgeny Primakov Jr.	United Russia	New post	Yes
Nizhny Novgorod	9 September 2018	Vladimir Panov	United Russia	Dmitry Svatkovsky	United Russia	New post	Yes
Central (Kaliningrad Oblast)	9 September 2018	Alexey Silanov	United Russia	Alexander Yaroshuk	United Russia	New post	Yes
Amur	9 September 2018	Ivan Abramov	Liberal Democratic Party	Andrey Kuzmin	Liberal Democratic Party	Resignation	Yes
Samara	9 September 2018	Nadezhda Kolesnikova	United Russia	Alexander Khinshtein	United Russia	Resignation	Yes
Novgorod	8 September 2019	Alexander Korovnikov	United Russia	Yury Bobryshev	United Russia	Death	Yes
Komsomolsk	8 September 2019	Sergey Furgal	Liberal Democratic Party	Ivan Pilyaev	Liberal Democratic Party	New post	Yes
Serov	8 September 2019	Sergey Bidonko	United Russia	Anton Shipulin	United Russia	New post	Yes
Oryol	8 September 2019	Nikolay Kovalyov	United Russia	Olga Pilipenko	United Russia	Death	Yes
Seimsky	13 September 2020	Viktor Karamyshev	United Russia	Alexey Zolotaryov	United Russia	New post	Yes
Lermontovsky	13 September 2020	Leonid Levin	A Just Russia	Aleksandr Samokutyayev	A Just Russia	New post	Yes
Yaroslavl	13 September 2020	Alexander Gribov	United Russia	Andrei Kovalenko	United Russia	New post	Yes
Nizhnekamsky	13 September 2020	Airat Khairullin	United Russia	Oleg Morozov	United Russia	Death	Yes

== 10 September 2017 ==
=== Kingisepp ===
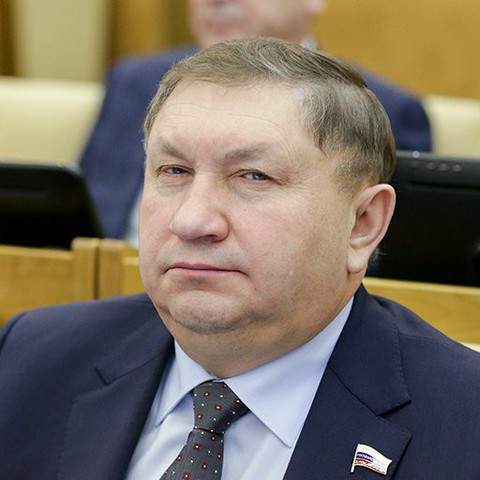
Elected Deputy Sergey Yakhnyuk

The seat from the Kingisepp constituency became vacant after the resignation of the Deputy Sergey Naryshkin, 5 October 2016. Naryshkin resigned in order to take up the post of head of Russia's Foreign Intelligence Service.

Candidate	Party	Votes	%
Sergey Yakhnyuk	United Russia	61,420	61.6%
Nikolay Kuzmin	Communist Party	11,269	11.3%
Marina Lyubushkina	A Just Russia	6,942	7.0%
Natalya Kruglova	Liberal Democratic Party	5,198	5.2%
Andrey Shirokov	Party of Pensioners	3,714	3.7%
Sergey Gulyaev	Yabloko	3,138	3.2%
Konstantin Zhukov	Communists of Russia	3,040	3.0%
Valery Shikarenko	Rodina	1,109	1.1%
Serik Urazov	Patriots of Russia	758	0.7%
Total		96,588	100%

=== Bryansk ===
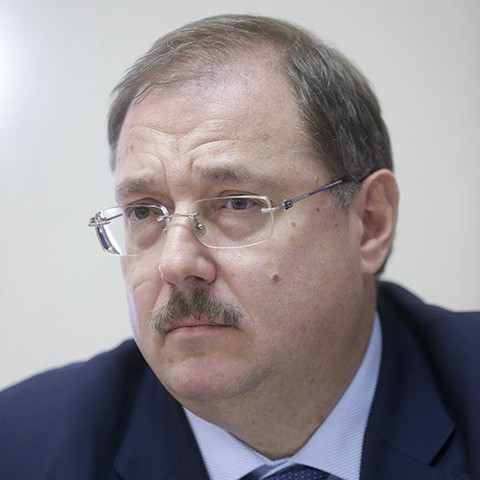
Elected Deputy Boris Paikin

The seat from the Bryansk constituency became vacant after the resignation of the Deputy Vladimir Zhutenkov, 10 June 2017.

Candidate	Party	Votes	%
Boris Paikin	Liberal Democratic Party	93,794	52.0%
Sergey Gorelov	Party of Growth	17,120	9.5%
Alexander Kupriyanov	Communist Party	16,911	9.3%
Sergey Kursenko	A Just Russia	11,123	6.2%
Vladimir Vorozhtsov	Party of Pensioners	8,814	4.9%
Konstantin Kasaminsky	Patriots of Russia	6,928	3.8%
Olga Matokhina	Yabloko	6,746	3.7%
Sergey Malinkovich	Communists of Russia	6,159	3.4%
Nikolay Alexeyenko	Rodina	4,890	2.7%
Total		172,485	100%

== 9 September 2018 ==
=== Saratov ===
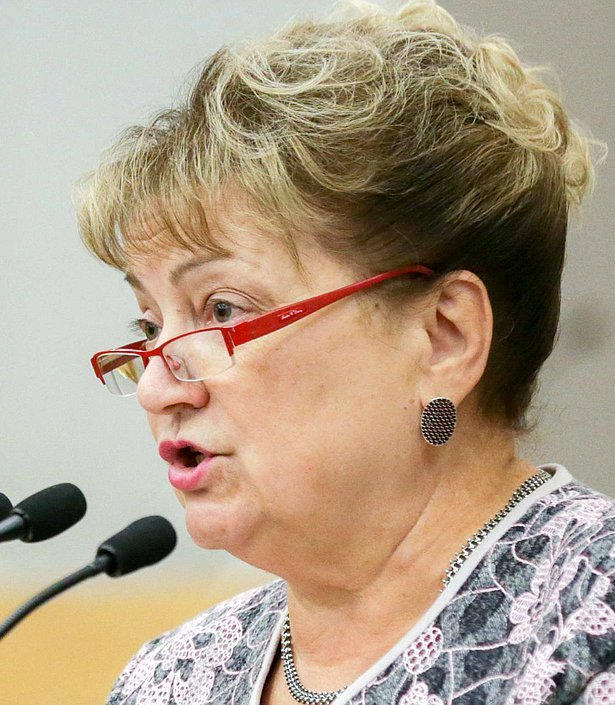
Elected Deputy Olga Alimova

On 17 June 2017, Deputy Oleg Grishchenko, who was elected from the Saratov constituency, died. A by-election will be held after the 2017 single voting day on 10 September 2017. A by-election must be scheduled for any Sunday within a year of the date the seat is officially vacated, and must be announced no later than 85 days before the next single day of voting. United Russia did not file a candidate in the Saratov constituency, in exchange CPRF did not participate in the simultaneous by-election in the Balashov constituency. On 9 September 2018 former Communist State Duma member Olga Alimova won the by-election with 45.35% of the vote.

==== Registered candidates ====
- Olga Alimova (CPRF), Vice Chairman of the Saratov Oblast Duma, former Member of the State Duma (2011-2016)
- Svetlana Berezina (A Just Russia), head of "Centre for Protection of Citizens' Rights" foundation office in Saratov
- Aleksandr Grishantsov (Communists of Russia), first secretary of Communists of Russia regional office
- Aleksandr Kargopolov (RPPSS), software engineer at Saratov Interregional Veterinary Laboratory
- Dmitry Pyanykh (LDPR), Member of the Saratov Oblast Duma
- Ksenia Sverdlova (Yabloko), head of communications at Fund for Support of Innovative Education

==== Declined ====
- Igor Morozov (United Russia), director of Saratov Oblast Basic Medical College (won the primaries but was not nominated)

==== Results ====
Summary of the 9 September 2018 by-election in the Saratov constituency
Candidate	Party	Votes	%
Olga Alimova	Communist Party	35,400	45.35%
Dmitry Pyanykh	Liberal Democratic Party	12,499	16.01%
Svetlana Berezina	A Just Russia	10,101	12.94%
Aleksandr Kargopolov	Party of Pensioners	7,934	10.16%
Aleksandr Grishantsov	Communists of Russia	5,310	6.80%
Ksenia Sverdlova	Yabloko	4,110	5.27%
Total		78,056	100%

=== Zavolzhsky ===
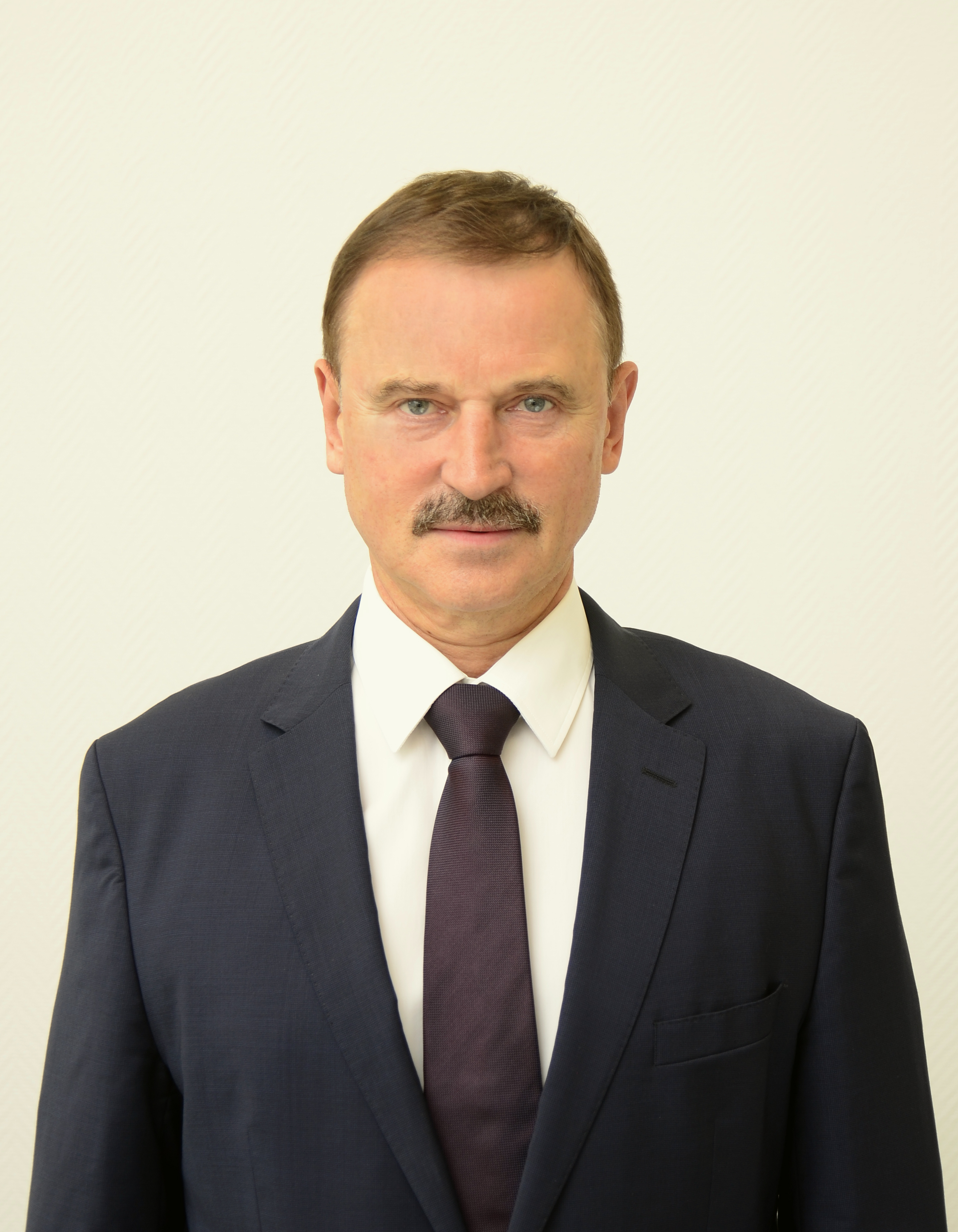
Elected Deputy Sergey Veremeenko

On 3 October 2017, Vladimir Vasilyev, who was elected from the Zavolzhsky constituency was appointed Acting Head of Dagestan. The by-election was won by billionaire and deputy general director of missile production factory "Sapfir" Sergey Veremeenko.

==== Registered candidates ====
- Leonid Bulatov (LDPR), Member of the Tver City Duma, aide to State Duma member Anton Morozov
- Aleksandr Grishin (RPPSS), former Member of the Legislative Assembly of Tver Oblast (2002-2011)
- Ilya Kleymyonov (Communists of Russia), Member of Konakovsky District Assembly of Deputies, first secretary of CPCR regional committee
- Vadim Solovyov (CPRF), former Member of the State Duma (2007-2016)
- Sergey Veremeenko (United Russia), Member of the Legislative Assembly of Tver Oblast, first deputy general director of Scientific and Production Association "Sapfir"
- Sergey Yurovsky (A Just Russia), Member of the Tver City Duma

==== Failed to qualify ====
- Sergey Zhegunov (Independent), chairman of the Labour Party of Russia regional office

==== Results ====
Summary of the 9 September 2018 by-election in the Zavolzhsky constituency
Candidate	Party	Votes	%
Sergey Veremeenko	United Russia	47,263	36.21%
Vadim Solovyov	Communist Party	27,177	20.82%
Leonid Bulatov	Liberal Democratic Party	15,706	12.03%
Sergey Yurovsky	A Just Russia	13,521	10.36%
Aleksandr Grishin	Party of Pensioners	11,620	8.90%
Ilya Kleymyonov	Communists of Russia	9,301	7.13%
Total		130,523	100%

=== Balashov ===
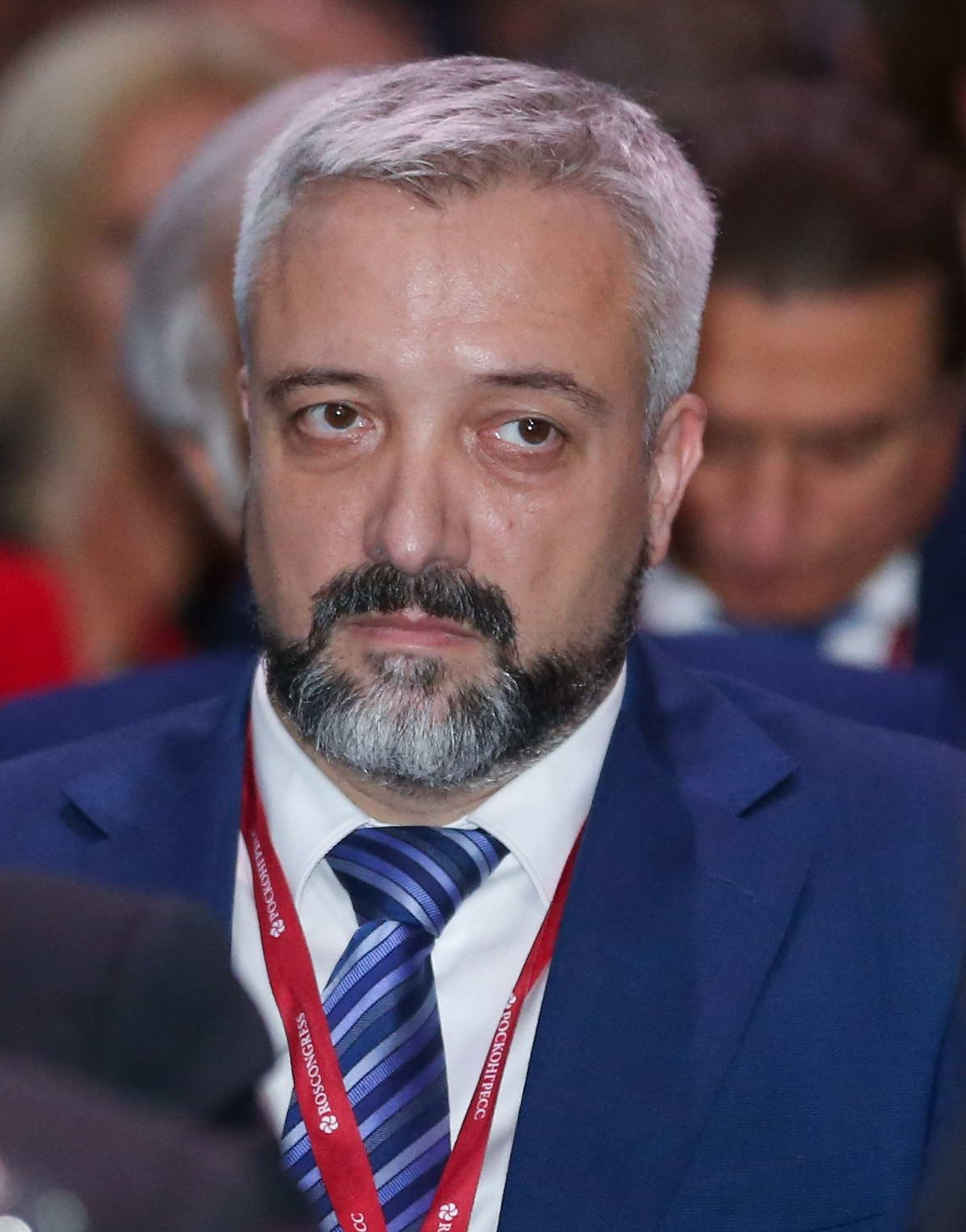
Elected Deputy Yevgeny Primakov Jr.

On 6 October 2017, Mikhail Isayev, who was elected from the Balashov constituency, was elected Mayor of Saratov. CPRF declined to nominate a candidate in Balashov constituency, in exchange United Russia did not file a challenger to Olga Alimova in the Saratov constituency. On 9 September 2018 Yevgeny Primakov Jr., journalist and grandson of former Prime Minister Yevgeny Primakov, won the by-election.

==== Registered candidates ====
- Yelena Chervyakova (RPPSS), tennis coach at Sport School of Olympian Reserve "Olympian Racquets"
- Stanislav Denisenko (LDPR), Member of the Saratov Oblast Duma
- Ilya Kozlyakov (Yabloko), deputy director for organisation of NPO "Centre for Informatisation and Supplementary Educational Services"
- Yevgeny Primakov (United Russia), journalist, general director of NPO "Russian Humanitarian Mission"
- Yelena Shanina (Communists of Russia), pensioner
- Nadezhda Skvortsova (A Just Russia), Saratov City Duma staffer
- Sergey Slepchenko (Independent), individual entrepreneur

==== Withdrew ====
- Rafil Bakhteev (Independent), Member of the Council of Pugachyov, preschool teacher

==== Results ====
Summary of the 9 September 2018 by-election in the Balashov constituency
Candidate	Party	Votes	%
Yevgeny Primakov	United Russia	104,227	65.15%
Yelena Shanina	Communists of Russia	18,481	11.55%
Stanislav Denisenko	Liberal Democratic Party	11,575	7.24%
Nadezhda Skvortsova	A Just Russia	9,722	6.08%
Yelena Chervyakova	Party of Pensioners	6,505	4.07%
Ilya Kozlyakov	Yabloko	2,312	1.45%
Sergey Slepchenko	Independent	1,590	0.99%
Total		159,985	100%

=== Nizhny Novgorod ===
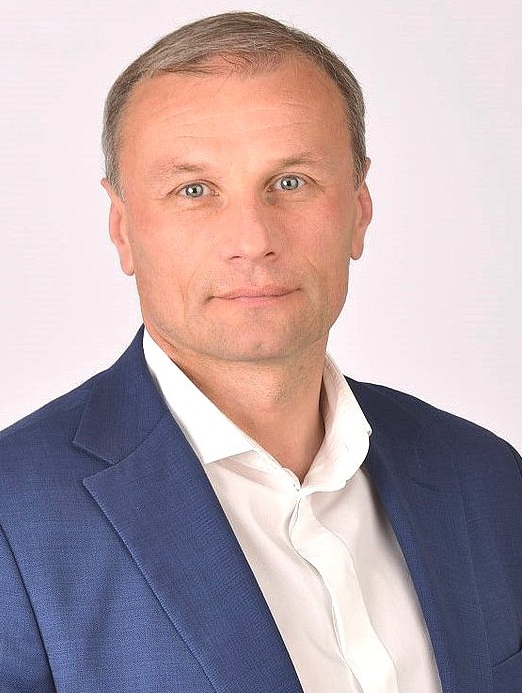
Elected Deputy Dmitry Svatkovsky

On 17 January 2018, Vladimir Panov, who was elected from the Nizhny Novgorod constituency was elected Mayor of Nizhny Novgorod. On 9 September 2018 Vice Governor Dmitry Svatkovsky was elected in the by-election.

==== Registered candidates ====
- Tatyana Grinevich (A Just Russia), chief aide to Legislative Assembly of Nizhny Novgorod Oblast member
- Aleksey Kruglov (LDPR), deputy director of LLP "AZS-Oktan"
- Oleg Rodin (Yabloko), chairman of the Yabloko regional office
- Nikolay Ryabov (CPRF), former Member of the State Duma (2007-2016)
- Dmitry Svatkovsky (United Russia), acting Vice Governor of Nizhny Novgorod Oblast, 2000 Olympian champion in modern pentathlon

==== Withdrew after registration ====
- Ilya Ulyanov (Communists of Russia), Member of the Supreme Council of the Republic of Khakassia

==== Failed to qualify ====
- Vadim Oreshin (Independent), retired Navy captain

==== Results ====
Summary of the 9 September 2018 by-election in the Nizhny Novgorod constituency
Candidate	Party	Votes	%
Dmitry Svatkovsky	United Russia	80,993	47.34%
Nikolay Ryabov	Communist Party	38,185	22.32%
Tatyana Grinevich	A Just Russia	18,444	10.78%
Aleksey Kruglov	Liberal Democratic Party	15,968	9.33%
Oleg Rodin	Yabloko	7,665	4.48%
Total		171,097	100%

=== Central (Kaliningrad Oblast) ===
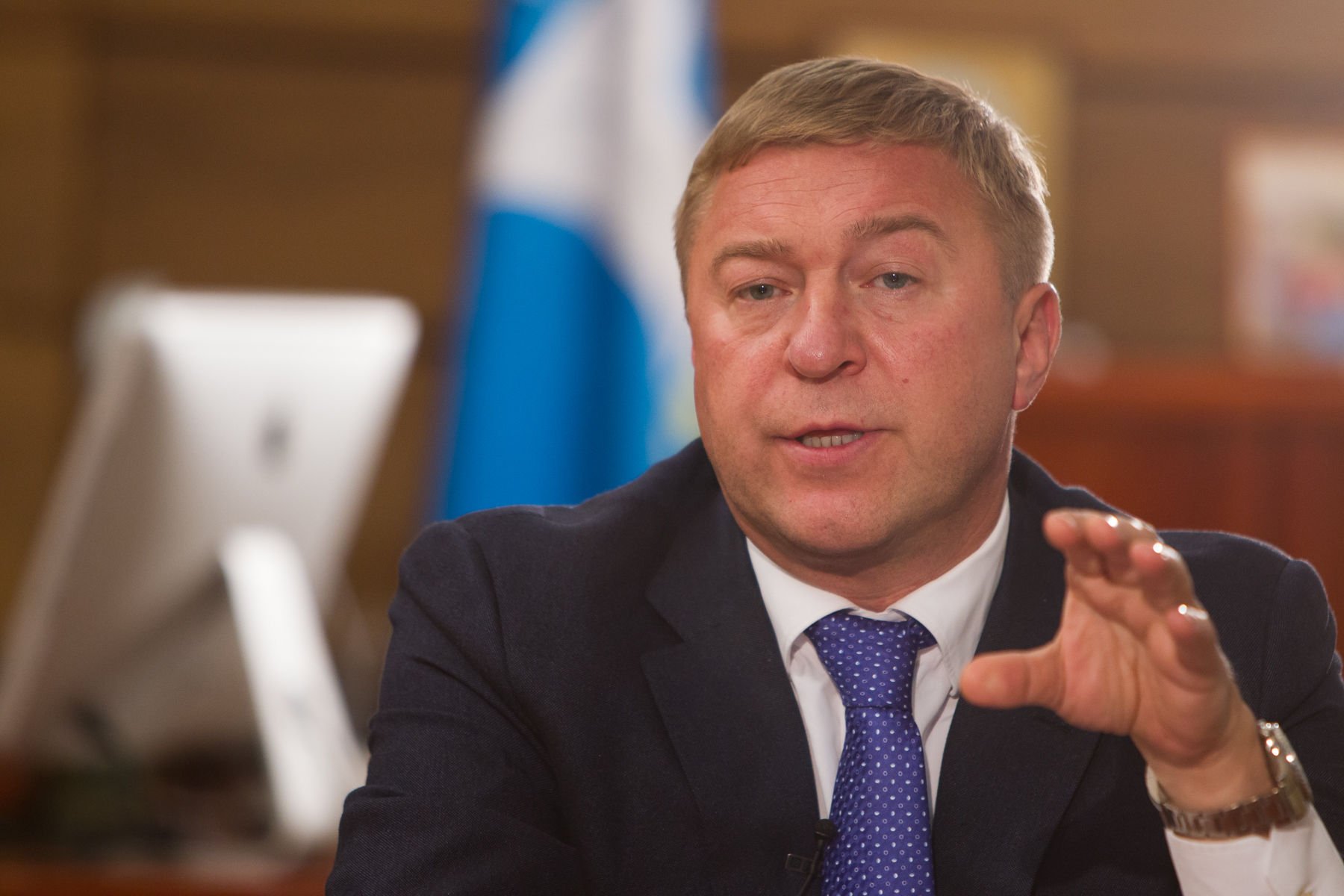
Elected Deputy Alexander Yaroshuk

On 18 April 2018, Alexey Silanov, who was elected from the Central constituency of Kaliningrad Oblast was elected Mayor of Kaliningrad. On 9 September 2018 former Kaliningrad Mayor Aleksandr Yaroshuk won the by-election.

==== Registered candidates ====
- Konstantin Doroshok (A Just Russia), former Member of the Kaliningrad Oblast Duma (2011-2016)
- Olga Kuzemskaya (RPPSS), former acting Deputy Chairman of the Government of Kirov Oblast (2016-2017)
- Yevgeny Mishin (LDPR), Member of the Kaliningrad Oblast Duma
- Aleksandr Orlov (Communists of Russia), first secretary of CPCR regional office
- Igor Revin (CPRF), Member of the Kaliningrad Oblast Duma, former Member of the State Duma (2015-2016)
- Aleksandr Yaroshuk (United Russia), former mayor of Kaliningrad (2012-2018)

==== Results ====
Summary of the 9 September 2018 by-election in the Central constituency
Candidate	Party	Votes	%
Aleksandr Yaroshuk	United Russia	32,185	39.87%
Igor Revin	Communist Party	18,206	22.55%
Yevgeny Mishin	Liberal Democratic Party	11,023	13.65%
Olga Kuzemskaya	Party of Pensioners	5,538	6.86%
Konstantin Doroshok	A Just Russia	5,212	6.46%
Aleksandr Orlov	Communists of Russia	4,408	5.46%
Total		80,729	100%

=== Amur ===
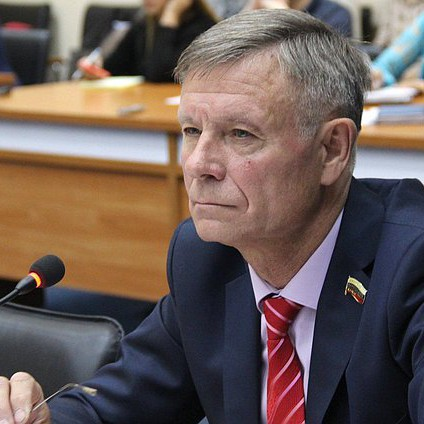
Elected Deputy Andrey Kuzmin

On 14 June 2018, Ivan Abramov, who was elected from the Amur constituency resigned, due to selection to the Federation Council. United Russia did not field any candidate in the by-election. On 9 September 2018 Blagoveshchensk City Duma member Andrey Kuzmin won the by-election.

==== Registered candidates ====
- Gennady Gamza (Communists of Russia), former Member of the State Duma (1995-2003)
- Andrey Kuzmin (LDPR), Member of the Blagoveshchensk City Duma
- Galina Nikishina (RPPSS), former chief doctor at Fevralsk rail hospital
- Tatyana Rakutina (CPRF), former Member of the Legislative Assembly of Amur Oblast (2007-2011)
- Kirill Zimin (A Just Russia), Member of the Legislative Assembly of Amur Oblast

==== Failed to qualify ====
- Lyubov Radchenko (CPSS), deputy administrator of LLP "Managing Company Amurkurort"

==== Results ====
Summary of the 9 September 2018 by-election in the Amur constituency
Candidate	Party	Votes	%
Andrey Kuzmin	Liberal Democratic Party	61,301	31.64%
Tatyana Rakutina	Communist Party	57,396	29.62%
Kirill Zimin	A Just Russia	26,170	13.51%
Gennady Gamza	Communists of Russia	20,556	10.61%
Galina Nikishina	Party of Pensioners	16,676	8.61%
Total		193,742	100%

=== Samara ===
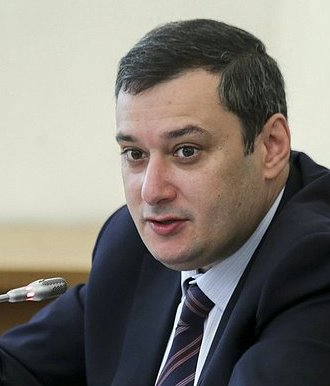
Elected Deputy Alexander Khinshtein

On 14 June 2018, Nadezhda Kolesnikova, who was elected from the Samara constituency resigned because she was moving to another job. On 9 September 2018 former State Duma member Aleksandr Khinshtein won the by-election.

==== Registered candidates ====
- Mikhail Abdalkin (CPRF), technological facility operator at Novokuybyshevsk Oil Refinery
- Vadim Baykov (Communists of Russia), first secretary of CPCR regional office
- Aleksandr Gusev (A Just Russia), Member of the Duma of Novokuybyshevsk, director of Novokuybyshevsk Water Utilities
- Aleksandr Khinshtein (United Russia), counselor to Director of National Guard of Russia, former Member of the State Duma (2003-2016)
- Roman Sinelnikov (LDPR), Member of Council of Deputies of Krasnoglinsky District of Samara, aide to State Duma Vice Speaker Igor Lebedev
- Igor Yermolenko (Yabloko), head of Centre for Students' Creativity at Samara Medical-Technical Lyceum, chairman of Yabloko regional office

==== Failed to qualify ====
- Vladimir Avdonin (Parnas), student at Samara State Medical University

==== Results ====
Summary of the 9 September 2018 by-election in the Samara constituency
Candidate	Party	Votes	%
Aleksandr Khinshtein	United Russia	117,726	56.98%
Mikhail Abdalkin	Communist Party	29,868	14.46%
Vadim Baykov	Communists of Russia	15,288	7.40%
Roman Sinelnikov	Liberal Democratic Party	13,318	6.45%
Aleksandr Gusev	A Just Russia	12,478	6.04%
Igor Yermolenko	Yabloko	6,758	3.27%
Total		206,602	100%

== 8 September 2019 ==
=== Novgorod ===
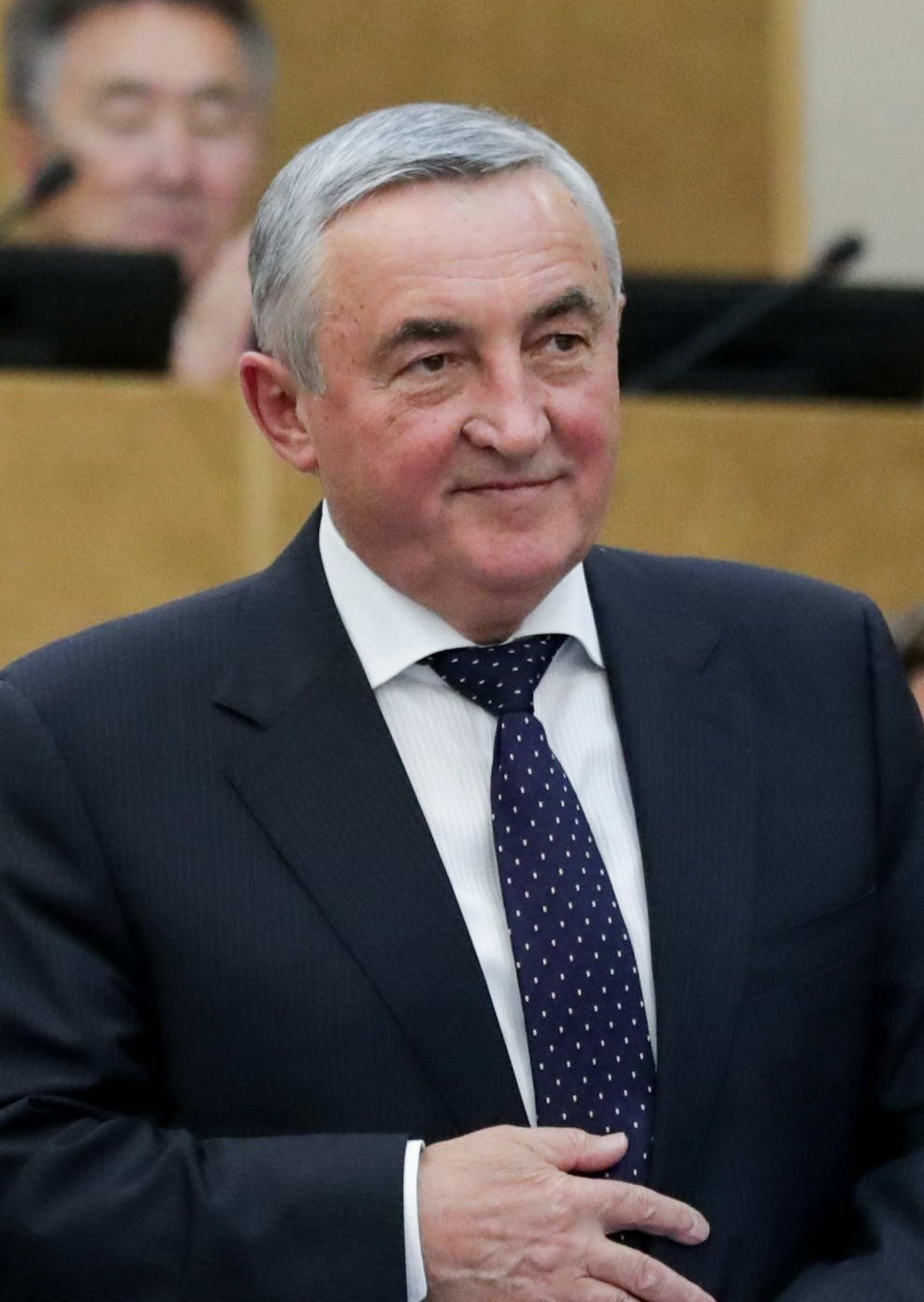
Elected Deputy Yury Bobryshev

On 11 August 2018 Aleksandr Korovnikov, who was elected from the Novgorod constituency, died. Since the Deputy died a month before the single voting day, and to organize a by-election in this constituency on 9 September 2018 is too late, according to the law, the by-election will be held in 2019 single voting day (8 September 2019). On 8 September 2019 former Veliky Novgorod Mayor Yury Bobryshev won the by-election.

==== Registered candidates ====
- Yury Bobryshev (United Russia), Vice Chairman of the Government of Novgorod Oblast, former mayor of Veliky Novgorod (2007-2018)
- Anna Cherepanova (Yabloko), Member of the Duma of Veliky Novgorod, chairwoman of the Yabloko regional office
- Aleksey Chursinov (LDPR), Vice Chairman of the Novgorod Oblast Duma
- Aleksandr Grishin (RPPSS), former Member of the Legislative Assembly of Tver Oblast (2002-2011)
- Dmitry Ignatov (A Just Russia), Member of the Novgorod Oblast Duma, general director of LLP "Jurist Consulting"
- Nina Ostanina (CPRF), former Member of the State Duma (1995-2011)
- Dmitry Perevyazkin (Communists of Russia), secretary of the Central Committee of CPCR
- Dmitry Tarasov (Party of Growth), general director of JSC "Managing Company Infrastructure Investments"
- Olga Yefimova (CPSS), dishwasher

==== Withdrew ====
- Ulyana Strizh (The Greens), reporter at LLP "Vashi Novosti"

==== Results ====
Summary of the 8 September 2019 by-election in the Novgorod constituency
Candidate	Party	Votes	%
Yury Bobryshev	United Russia	40,293	35.39%
Nina Ostanina	Communist Party	23,154	20.33%
Dmitry Ignatov	A Just Russia	14,745	12.95%
Anna Cherepanova	Yabloko	9,153	8.04%
Aleksey Chursinov	Liberal Democratic Party	7,366	6.47%
Olga Yefimova	Communist Party of Social Justice	6,144	5.40%
Aleksandr Grishin	Party of Pensioners	3,621	3.18%
Dmitry Perevyazkin	Communists of Russia	2,483	2.18%
Dmitry Tarasov	Party of Growth	2,131	1.87%
Total		113,865	100%

=== Komsomolsk ===
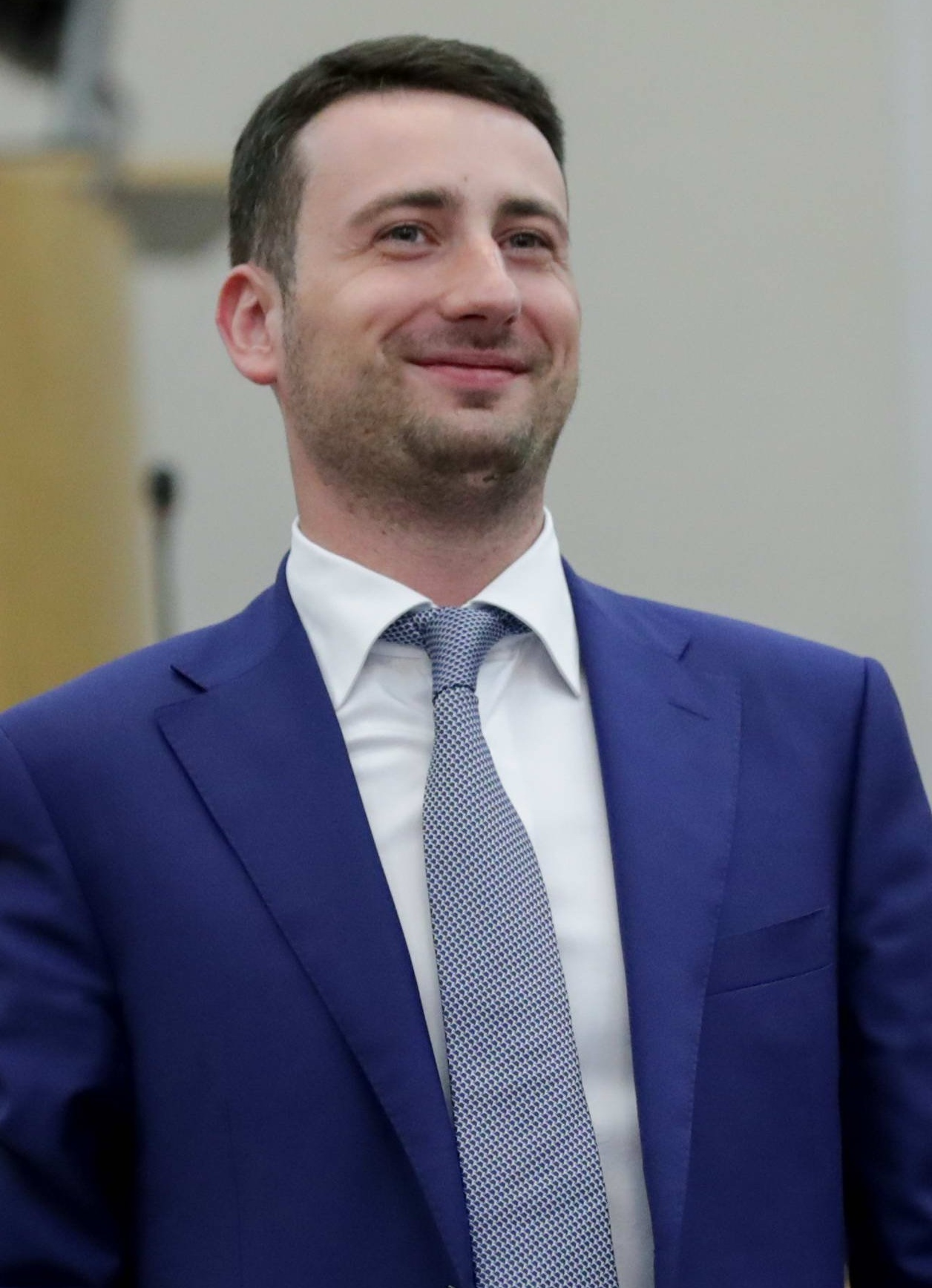
Elected Deputy Ivan Pilyaev

On 23 September 2018, Sergey Furgal who was elected from the Komsomolsk-na-Amure constituency, was elected Governor of Khabarovsk Krai. On 8 September 2019 Ivan Pilyaev won the by-election.

==== Registered candidates ====
- Oleg Kotov (Patriots of Russia), individual entrepreneur
- Andrey Petrov (The Greens), Deputy Head of the Department of Forest Management of Khabarovsk Krai
- Ivan Pilyaev (LDPR), aide to State Duma member Valery Seleznev, acting coordinator of LDPR regional office in Jewish Autonomous Oblast
- Nikolay Platoshkin (CPRF), head of the department of foreign relations and diplomacy at the Moscow University for the Humanities, chairman of the For a New Socialism movement
- Andrey Shvetsov (Party of Growth), deputy general director of Prima Media Holding
- Vladimir Titorenko (Communists of Russia), office manager at LLP "TSEPTER International"
- Viktoria Tsyganova (United Russia), singer and songwriter, actress at Triada Theatre
- Vladimir Vorobyev (Rodina), deputy general director of LLP "KargoGrupp"
- Tatyana Yaroslavtseva (A Just Russia), member of the Public Chamber of Khabarovsk Krai, former Member of the Khabarovsk Krai Council of People's Deputies (1990-1994)
- Nikolay Yevseenko (RPPSS), director of Khabarovsk Krai Drama Theatre

==== Results ====
Summary of the 8 September 2019 by-election in the Komsomolsk-na-Amure constituency
Candidate	Party	Votes	%
Ivan Pilyaev	Liberal Democratic Party	65,596	39.12%
Nikolay Platoshkin	Communist Party	41,398	24.69%
Viktoria Tsyganova	United Russia	17,901	10.68%
Tatyana Yaroslavtseva	A Just Russia	7,887	4.70%
Nikolay Yevseenko	Party of Pensioners	5,637	3.36%
Andrey Petrov	The Greens	5,167	3.08%
Vladimir Titorenko	Communists of Russia	4,898	2.92%
Vladimir Vorobyev	Rodina	3,420	2.04%
Andrey Shvetsov	Party of Growth	3,020	1.80%
Oleg Kotov	Patriots of Russia	2,989	1.78%
Total		167,685	100%

=== Serov ===
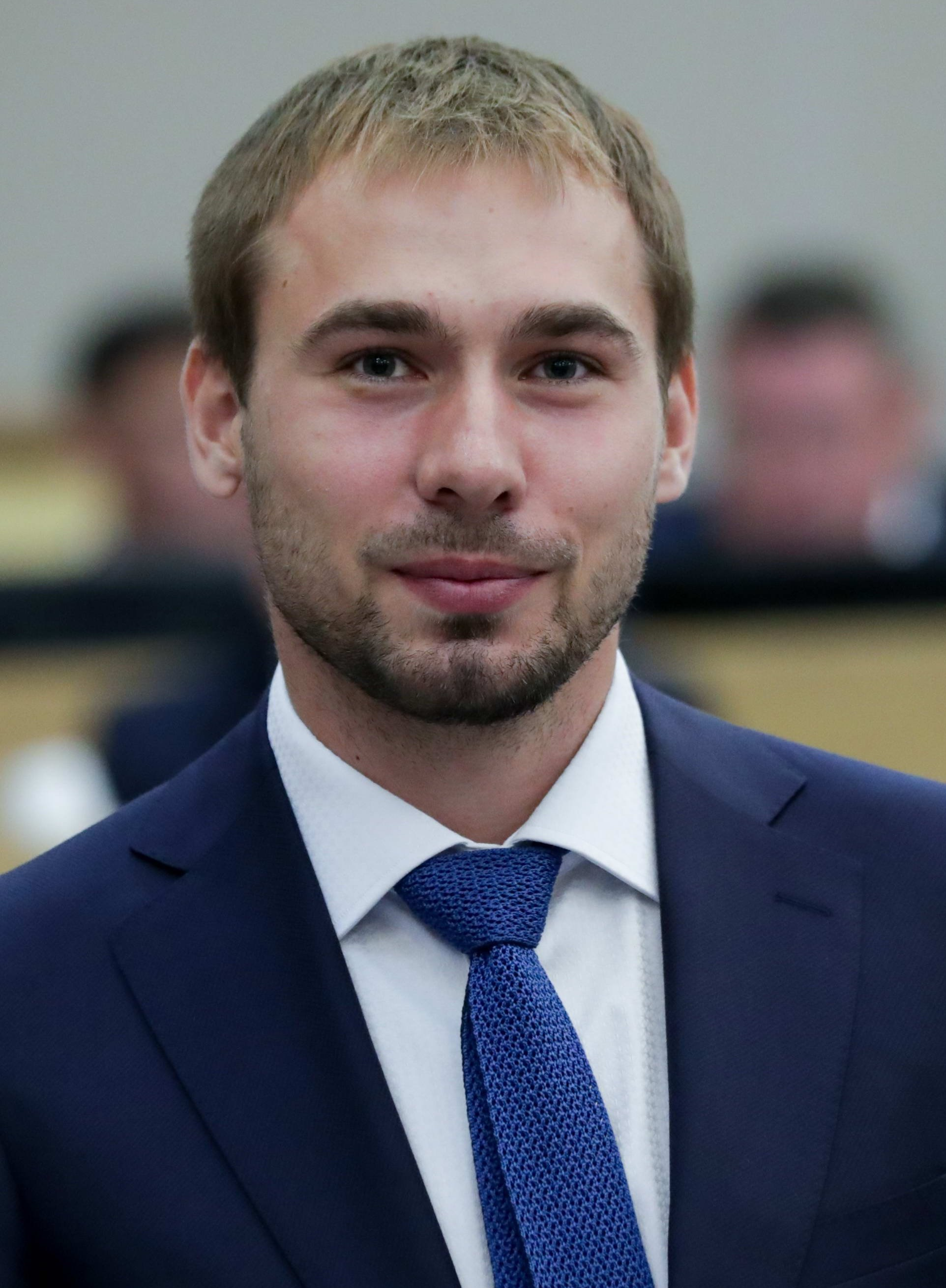
Elected Deputy Anton Shipulin

On 12 December 2018, Sergey Bidonko who was elected from the Serov constituency, was appointed the Vice Governor of Sverdlovsk Oblast. On 8 September 2019 biathlete Anton Shipulin won the by-election.

==== Registered candidates ====
- Yevgenia Chudnovets (LDPR), activist, defendant in Chudnovets Case
- Gabbas Dautov (CPRF), Member of the Duma of Kachkanar
- Aleksey Korovkin (A Just Russia), paramedic at Novolyalinsky District Hospital
- Igor Ruzakov (The Greens), lawyer, chairman of The Greens regional office
- Anton Shipulin (United Russia), biathlete, 2014 Olympic champion (disqualified in 2020)
- Irina Skachkova (Yabloko), teacher
- Dmitry Zenov (Communists of Russia), acting first secretary of CPCR regional committee

==== Failed to qualify ====
- Sergey Kapchuk (Party of Growth), former Member of the Chamber of Representatives of the Legislative Assembly of Sverdlovsk Oblast (2000-2008), former Vice Governor of Sverdlovsk Oblast (1996-2000)

==== Results ====
Summary of the 8 September 2019 by-election in the Serov constituency
Candidate	Party	Votes	%
Anton Shipulin	United Russia	46,015	41.59%
Aleksey Korovkin	A Just Russia	26,583	24.03%
Gabbas Daudov	Communist Party	15,276	13.81%
Yevgenia Chudnovets	Liberal Democratic Party	8,280	7.48%
Irina Skachkova	Yabloko	3,999	3.55%
Dmitry Zenov	Communists of Russia	3,700	3.34%
Igor Ruzakov	The Greens	2,157	1.95%
Total		110,635	100%

=== Oryol ===
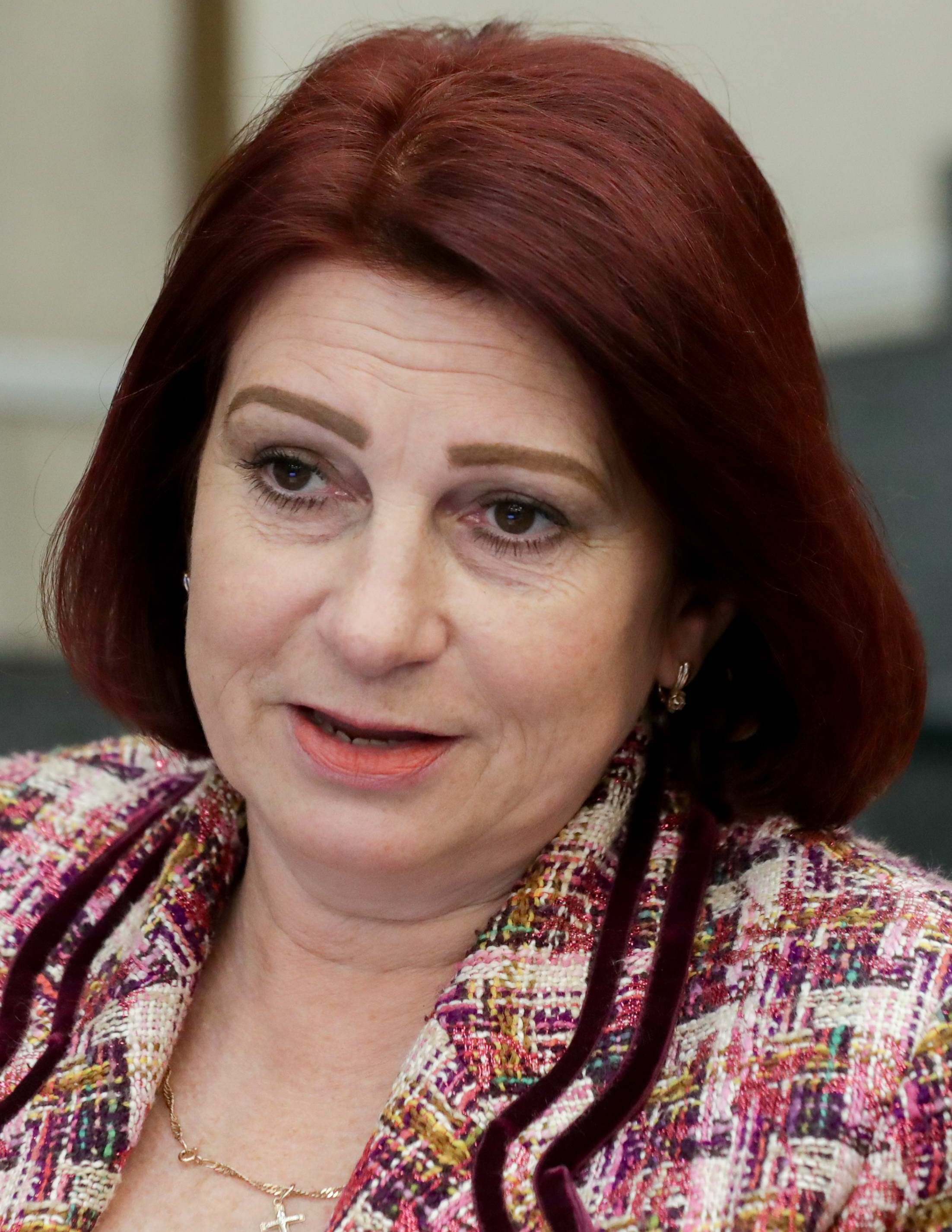
Elected Deputy Olga Pilipenko

On 5 April 2019, Nikolay Kovalyov who was elected from the Oryol constituency, died. On 8 September 2019 Oryol State University rector Olga Pilipenko won the by-election.

==== Registered candidates ====
- Valery Chudo (Yabloko), generał director of LLP "Yenich"
- Ivan Dynkovich (CPRF), Member of the Oryol City Council of People's Deputies, aide to State Duma member Nikolay Ivanov
- Sergey Kuznetsov (Rodina), general director of LLP "Spektrfarm"
- Roman Neverov (LDPR), coordinator of LDPR regional office
- Mikhail Orlov (Communists of Russia), acting first secretary of CPCR regional committee in Ulyanovsk Oblast
- Ruslan Perelygin (A Just Russia), Member of the Oryol Oblast Council of People's Deputies, chairman of A Just Russia regional office
- Olga Pilipenko (United Russia), Member of the Oryol Oblast Council of People's Deputies, rector of Oryol State University
- Oleg Timokhin (RPPSS), general director of JSC "Krasnaya Zvezda"

==== Failed to qualify ====
- Marina Prokofyeva (Independent), pensioner, community activist

==== Results ====
Summary of the 8 September 2019 by-election in the Oryol constituency
Candidate	Party	Votes	%
Olga Pilipenko	United Russia	152,073	53.62%
Ivan Dynkovich	Communist Party	45,303	15.97%
Oleg Timokhin	Party of Pensioners	23,165	8.17%
Ruslan Perelygin	A Just Russia	16,724	5.90%
Roman Neverov	Liberal Democratic Party	12,929	4.56%
Valery Chudo	Yabloko	10,169	3.59%
Mikhail Orlov	Communists of Russia	9,909	3.50%
Sergey Kuznetsov	Rodina	5,281	1.86%
Total		283,631	100%

== 13 September 2020 ==
=== Seimsky ===
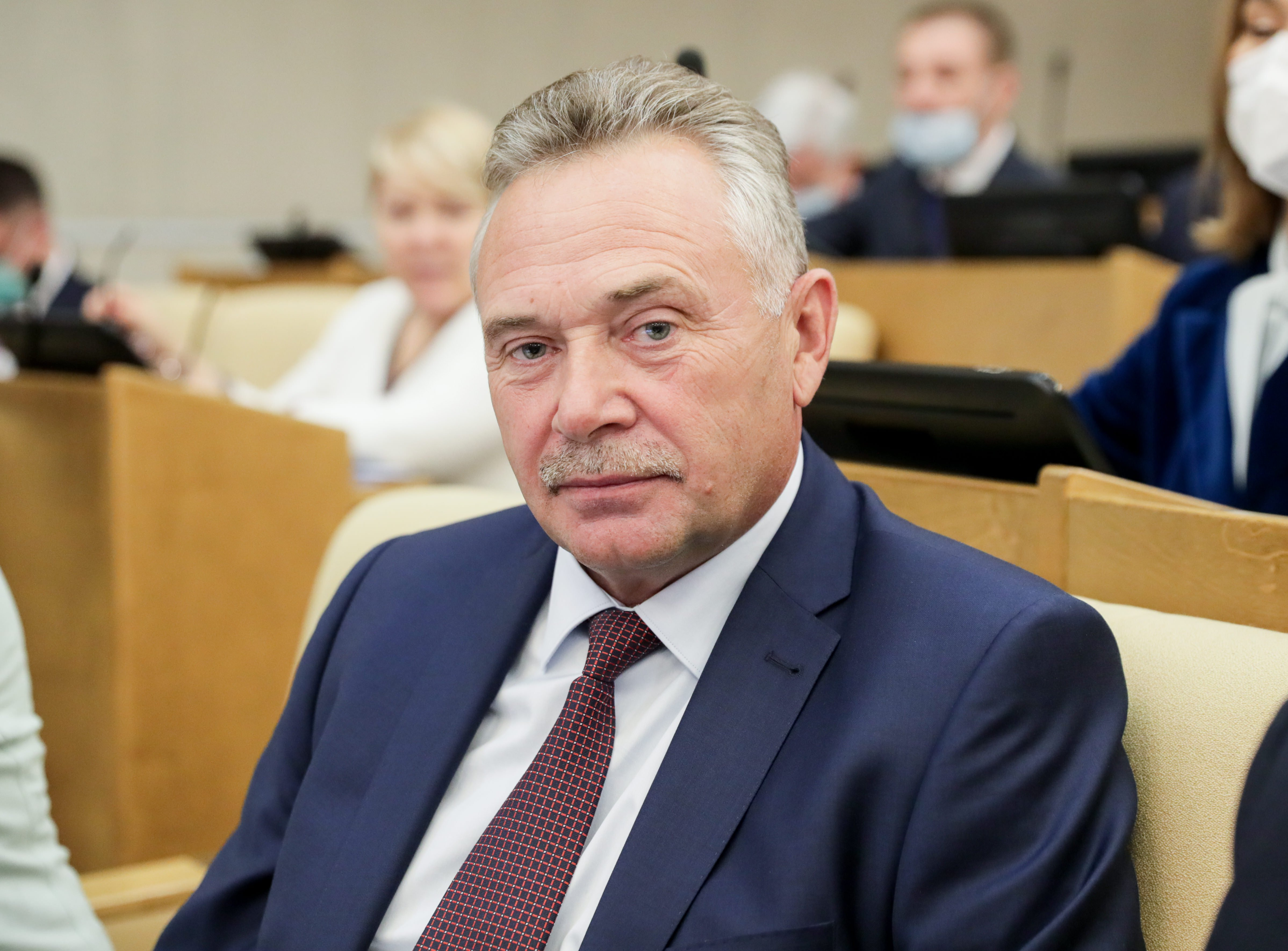
Elected Deputy Alexey Zolotaryov

On 20 June 2019, Viktor Karamyshev, who was elected from the Seimsky constituency was elected Mayor of Kursk. Since Karamyshev resigned only on 9 July, it was no longer possible to appoint by-election for a 2019 single voting day, because of this, the by-election will be held in 2020. On 13 September 2020 former Vice Governor Aleksey Zolotarev won the by-election.

==== Registered candidates ====
- Aleksey Bobovnikov (CPRF), Member of the Kursk City Assembly
- Anatoly Kurakin (A Just Russia), chief doctor at Vash Doktor clinic
- Aleksey Tomanov (LDPR), Member of the Kursk City Assembly, coordinator of LDPR regional office
- Artyom Vakarev (Communists of Russia), second secretary of CPCR regional committee
- Aleksey Zolotarev (United Russia), former Deputy Governor of Kursk Oblast (2012-2020)

==== Withdrew ====
- Aleksandr Fedulov (Independent), former Member of the State Duma (1999-2003)
- Yevgeny Pronichenko (Independent), assistant at the department of forensic medicine at Kursk State Medical University

==== Results ====
Summary of the 13 September 2020 by-election in the Seimsky constituency
Candidate	Party	Votes	%
Aleksey Zolotarev	United Russia	108,523	60.08%
Aleksey Bobovnikov	Communist Party	25,650	14.20%
Anatoly Kurakin	A Just Russia	15,727	8.71%
Aleksey Tomanov	Liberal Democratic Party	14,508	8.03%
Artyom Vakarev	Communists of Russia	11,388	6.30%
Total		180,626	100%

=== Lermontovsky ===
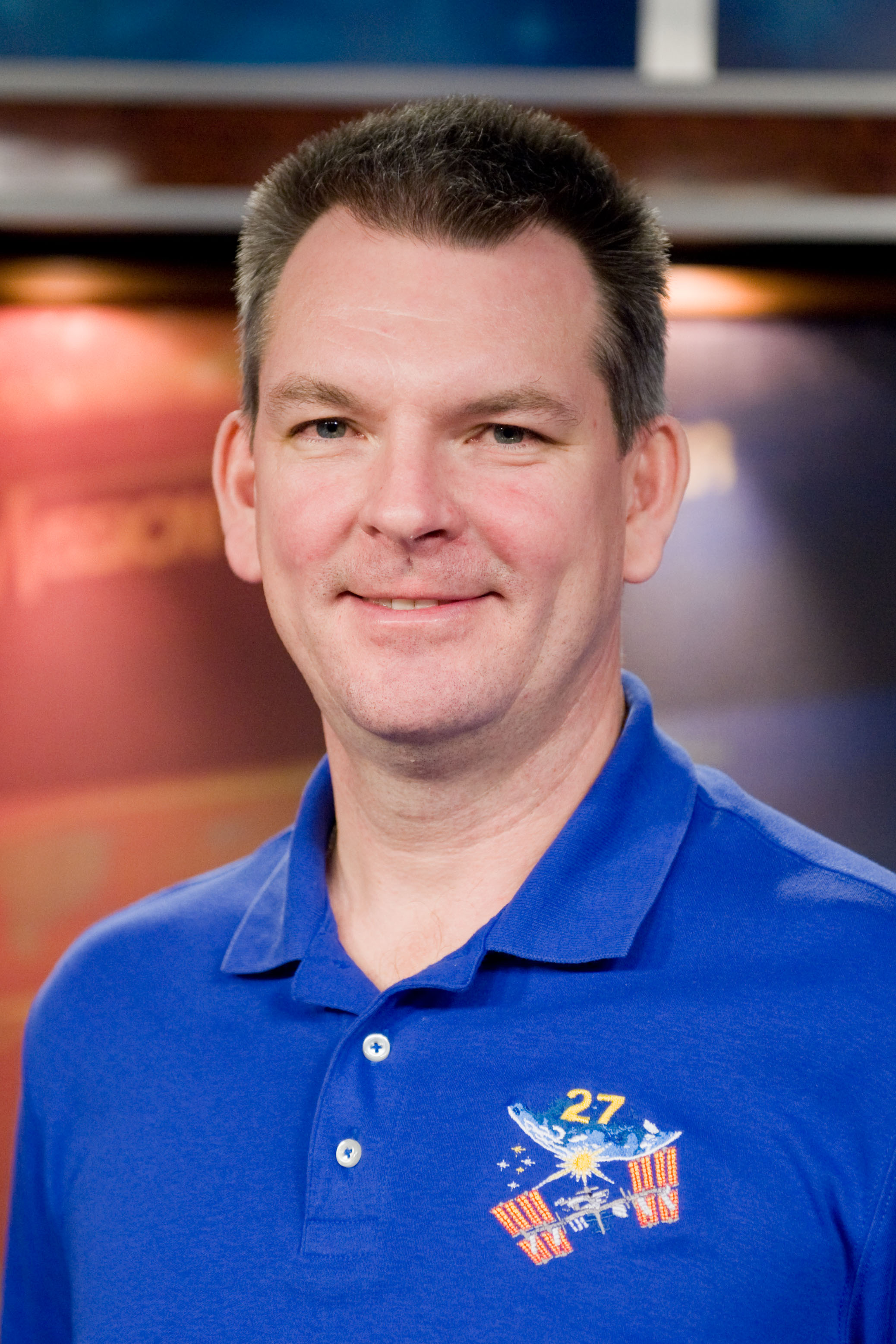
Elected Deputy Aleksandr Samokutyayev

On 22 January 2020, Leonid Levin, who was elected from the Lermontovsky constituency was appointed Deputy Chief of Staff of the Government. United Russia primary election was not held, as both filed candidates — general director of LLP "Khoroshee Delo" Sergey Novikov and cosmonaut Aleksandr Samokutyayev — withdrew their candidacies from the primaries. Samokutyayev eventually ran as A Just Russia candidate and won the by-election on 13 September 2020.

==== Registered candidates ====
- Fatima Khugaeva (Communists of Russia), MVD pensioner
- Kirill Metalnikov (Civic Platform), general director of LLP "Meridian"
- Aleksandr Samokutyayev (A Just Russia), cosmonaut
- Vadim Serdovintsev (LDPR), Member of the Assembly of Representatives of Nizhny Lomov, general director of LLP "Perunovo koleso"
- Aleksandr Trutnev (CPRF), Member of the Penza City Duma, commercial director of LLP TP "Snezhok"
- Yevgeny Vorozhtsov (RPPSS), lawyer

==== Results ====
Summary of the 13 September 2020 by-election in the Lermontovsky constituency
Candidate	Party	Votes	%
Aleksandr Samokutyayev	A Just Russia	162,004	60.38%
Aleksandr Trutnev	Communist Party	34,925	13.02%
Vadim Serdovintsev	Liberal Democratic Party	19,803	7.38%
Yevgeny Vorozhtsov	Party of Pensioners	19,626	7.32%
Fatima Khugaeva	Communists of Russia	11,118	4.14%
Kirill Metalnikov	Civic Platform	10,957	4.08%
Total		268,286	100%

=== Yaroslavl ===
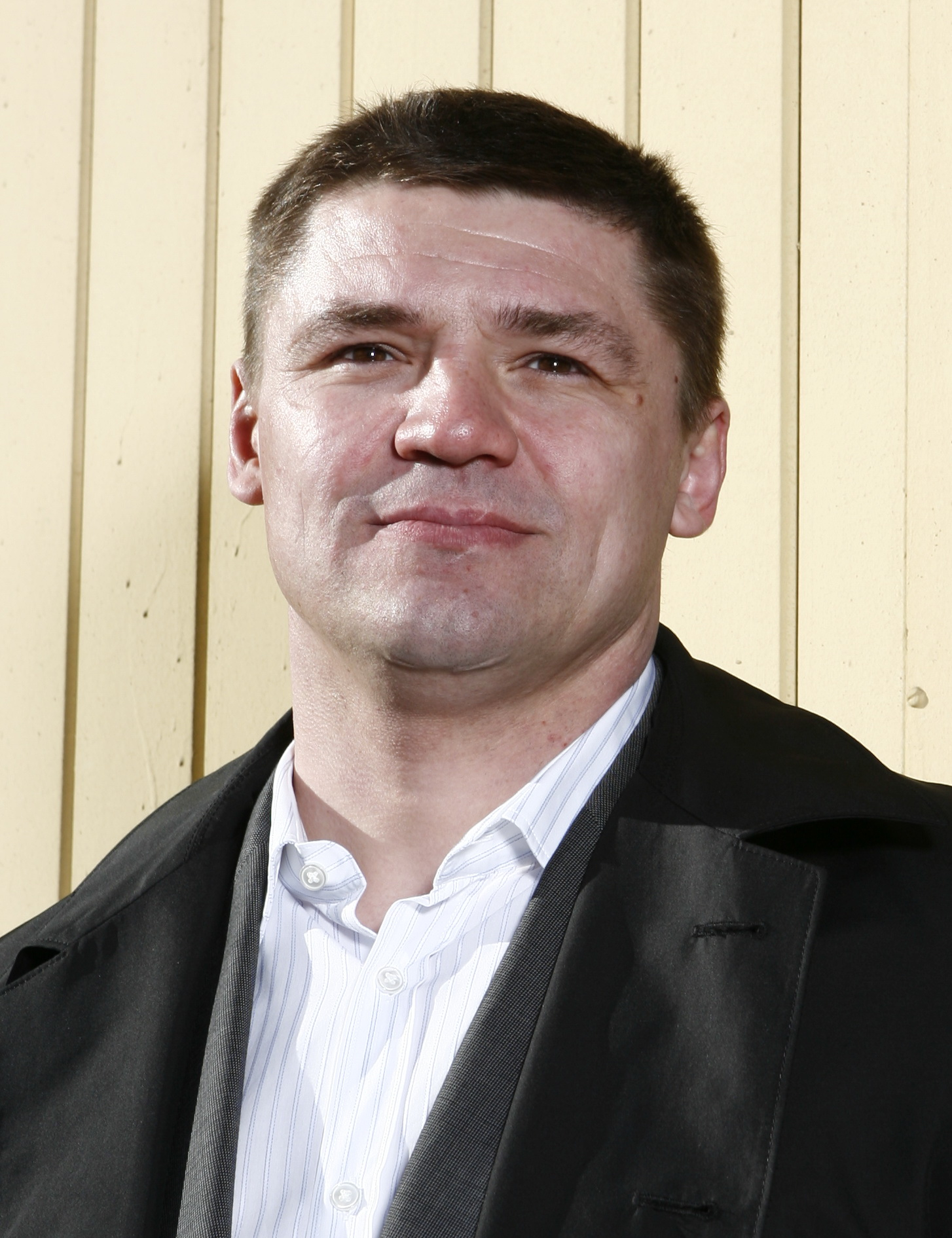
Elected Deputy Andrei Kovalenko

On 23 January 2020, Aleksandr Gribov, who was elected from the Yaroslavl constituency was appointed Deputy Chief of Staff of the Government. On 13 September 2020 ice hockey player Andrey Kovalenko won the by-election.

==== Registered candidates ====
- Oleg Bulaev (CPSS), secretary of the Central Committee of CPSS, former Member of the Volgograd City Duma (2013-2018)
- Andrey Kovalenko (United Russia), Member of the Yaroslavl Oblast Duma, 1992 Olympic champion in ice hockey
- Yelena Kuznetsova (CPRF), Vice Chairman of the Yaroslavl Oblast Duma
- Anatoly Lisitsyn (A Just Russia), former Member of the Federation Council (2011-2018), former Member of the State Duma (2007-2011), former Governor of Yaroslavl Oblast (1991-2007)
- Irina Lobanova (LDPR), Member of the Yaroslavl Oblast Duma
- Oksana Romashkova (Communists of Russia), senior fellow at Russian Presidential Academy of National Economy and Public Administration
- Oleg Vinogradov (Yabloko), former Deputy Governor of Yaroslavl Oblast (2006-2009), chairman of Yabloko regional office
- Vladimir Vorozhtsov (RPPSS), former First Deputy Director of Federal Tax Police Service (2000-2002)

==== Failed to qualify ====
- Imamaddin Alasov (Independent), director of LLP "Sedmoe Nebo"
- Ilya Shesterikov (Independent), director of LLP "Gorodskaya Abonentskaya Sluzhba"

==== Results ====
Summary of the 13 September 2020 Russian by-election in the Yaroslavl constituency
Candidate	Party	Votes	%
Andrey Kovalenko	United Russia	47,562	40.27%
Anatoly Lisitsyn	A Just Russia	40,407	34.21%
Yelena Kuznetsova	Communist Party	13,817	11.70%
Oleg Vinogradov	Yabloko	4,578	3.88%
Irina Lobanova	Liberal Democratic Party	4,049	3.43%
Vladimir Vorozhtsov	Party of Pensioners	2,188	1.85%
Oleg Bulayev	Communist Party of Social Justice	1,380	1.17%
Oksana Romashkova	Communists of Russia	1,356	1.15%
Total		118,108	100%

=== Nizhnekamsk ===
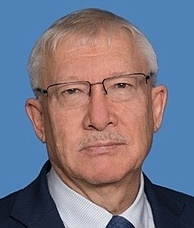
Elected Deputy Oleg Morozov

On 7 February 2020, Airat Khairullin, who was elected from the Nizhnekamsk constituency died in a helicopter crash. On 13 September 2020 Senator of the Federation Council Oleg Morozov won the by-election.

==== Registered candidates ====
- Nikolay Barsukov (Communists of Russia), Member of the Kirov City Duma, first secretary of CPCR committee in Kirov Oblast
- Vasily Kolosov (LDPR), director "Planeta Talantov" foundation
- Oleg Morozov (United Russia), Senator of the Federation Council from Tatarstan, former Member of the State Duma (1994-2012)
- Ilnar Siraev (A Just Russia), Member of the Council of Turaevo in Mendeleyevsky District, general director of LLP "Neft-NK"
- Leonid Strazhnikov (CPSS), play zone administrator of LLP "Tatigra"
- Albert Yagudin (CPRF), Member of the Nizhnekamsk City Council, general director of CJSC "Nizhnekamsk Invest Holding"

==== Failed to qualify ====
- Vasily Korotkikh (Independent), database developer

==== Results ====
Summary of the 13 September 2020 by-election in the Nizhnekamsk constituency
Candidate	Party	Votes	%
Oleg Morozov	United Russia	279,450	73.42%
Albert Yagudin	Communist Party	35,536	9.34%
Ilnar Siraev	A Just Russia	26,001	6.83%
Nikolay Barsukov	Communists of Russia	14,351	3.77%
Andrey Kolosov	Liberal Democratic Party	14,149	3.72%
Leonid Strazhnikov	Communist Party of Social Justice	8,736	2.30%
Total		380,616	100%
