= Oryol constituency =

Oryol single-member constituency
- Constituency of the Russian State Duma

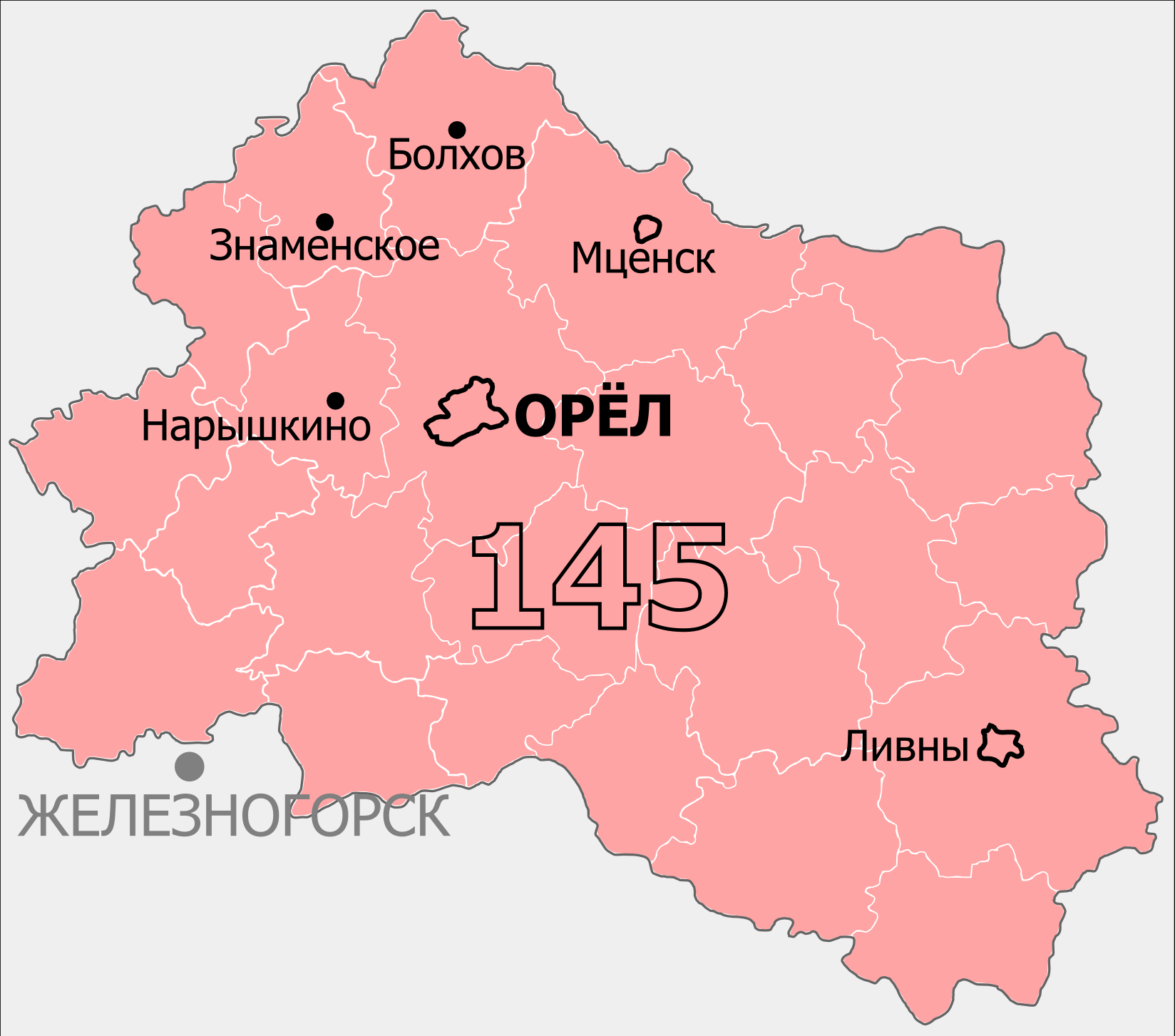
- Deputy: Aleksandr Biryukov; United Russia
- Federal subject: Oryol Oblast
- Districts: Bolkhovsky, Dmitrovsky, Dolzhansky, Glazunovsky, Khotynetsky, Kolpnyansky, Korsakovsky, Krasnozorensky, Kromskoy, Livensky, Livny, Maloarkhangelsky, Mtsensk, Mtsensky, Novoderevenkovsky, Novosilsky, Orlovsky, Oryol, Pokrovsky, Shablykinsky, Soskovsky, Sverdlovsky, Trosnyansky, Uritsky, Verkhovsky, Zalegoshchensky, Znamensky
- Voters: 579,344 (2026)

The Oryol constituency (No.147 (Note: No.134 in 1993-2007, No.145 in 2016–2026)) is a Russian legislative constituency in Oryol Oblast. The constituency encompasses the entire territory of Oryol Oblast.

The constituency has been represented since the 2026 by United Russia deputy Aleksandr Biryukov, former Deputy Governor of Oryol Oblast and construction businessman, who won the open seat, succeeding two-term United Russia incumbent Olga Pilipenko.

== Boundaries ==
1993–2007, 2016–present: Bolkhovsky District, Dmitrovsky District, Dolzhansky District, Glazunovsky District, Khotynetsky District, Kolpnyansky District, Korsakovsky District, Krasnozorensky District, Kromskoy District, Livensky District, Livny, Maloarkhangelsky District, Mtsensk, Mtsensky District, Novoderevenkovsky District, Novosilsky District, Orlovsky District, Oryol, Pokrovsky District, Shablykinsky District, Soskovsky District, Sverdlovsky District, Trosnyansky District, Uritsky District, Verkhovsky District, Zalegoshchensky District, Znamensky District
The constituency has been covering the entirety of Oryol Oblast since its initial creation in 1993.

== Members elected ==
Election	Member	Party
1993	Aleksandr Voropayev	Independent
1995	Aleksey Zotikov	Communist Party
1999	Aleksandr Labeykin	Communist Party
2003	Ivan Mosyakin (Note: elected as Chairman of the Oryol Oblast Council of People's Deputies in March 2007)	Independent
2007	Proportional representation - no election by constituency	
2011	Proportional representation - no election by constituency	
2016	Nikolay Kovalyov (Note: died in April 2019)	United Russia
2019	Olga Pilipenko	United Russia
2021	Olga Pilipenko	United Russia
2026	Aleksandr Biryukov	United Russia

== Election results ==
=== 1993 ===
Summary of the 12 December 1993 Russian legislative election in the Oryol constituency
Candidate	Party	Votes	%
Aleksandr Voropayev	Independent	82,657	18.62%
Aleksey Zotikov	Communist Party	66,286	14.93%
Vladimir Samarin	Independent	60,853	13.71%
Vladimir Borzyuk	Liberal Democratic Party	39,380	8.87%
Nadezhda Galkina	Choice of Russia	33,300	7.50%
Vladimir Zyabkin	Democratic Party	29,621	6.67%
Vyacheslav Azarov	Independent	25,154	5.67%
Fyodor Klykovsky	Independent	8,465	1.91%
against all		70,300	15.83%
Total		444,010	100%

=== 1995 ===
Summary of the 17 December 1995 Russian legislative election in the Oryol constituency
Candidate	Party	Votes	%
Aleksey Zotikov	Communist Party	161,070	33.37%
Tamara Konovalova	Agrarian Party	106,132	21.99%
Nikolay Yudin	Independent	45,333	9.39%
Sergey Isakov	Liberal Democratic Party	27,472	5.69%
Vyacheslav Golenkov	Our Home – Russia	25,488	5.28%
Aleksandr Vasilkovsky	Independent	19,916	4.13%
Vladimir Zyabkin	Congress of Russian Communities	15,074	3.12%
Irina Salnikova	Independent	13,038	2.70%
Nikolay Dolzhikov	Independent	9,541	1.98%
Nikolay Lyuty	Independent	9,536	1.98%
against all		41,761	8.65%
Total		482,705	100%

=== 1999 ===
Summary of the 19 December 1999 Russian legislative election in the Oryol constituency
Candidate	Party	Votes	%
Aleksandr Labeykin	Communist Party	299,413	62.75%
Aleksandr Kasyanov	Russian Socialist Party	31,603	6.62%
Sergey Bogatishchev	Russian Cause	23,772	4.98%
Aleksandr Yepimakhov	Russian All-People's Union	16,319	3.42%
Aleksey Yegurnov	Independent	14,229	2.98%
Vladimir Pochechikin	Spiritual Heritage	12,178	2.55%
against all		72,733	15.24%
Total		477,143	100%

=== 2003 ===
Summary of the 7 December 2003 Russian legislative election in the Oryol constituency
Candidate	Party	Votes	%
Ivan Mosyakin	Independent	224,851	47.26%
Aleksey Kuzmin	New Course — Automobile Russia	68,846	14.47%
Sergey Bavykin	Liberal Democratic Party	33,822	7.11%
Sergey Tarasov	Union of Right Forces	23,256	4.89%
Vladimir Zyabkin	Democratic Party	17,492	3.68%
Dmitry Shchipakov	United Russian Party Rus'	10,816	2.27%
against all		87,161	18.32%
Total		476,053	100%

=== 2016 ===
Summary of the 18 September 2016 Russian legislative election in the Oryol constituency
Candidate	Party	Votes	%
Nikolay Kovalyov	United Russia	159,658	46.52%
Vasily Ikonnikov	Communist Party	69,348	20.21%
Andrey Kutsyn	Liberal Democratic Party	31,724	9.24%
Ruslan Perelygin	A Just Russia	27,344	7.97%
Mikhail Vakarev	Communists of Russia	13,313	3.88%
Aleksandr Kirillov	Yabloko	6,971	2.03%
Andrey Korneyev	Party of Growth	6,160	1.79%
Igor Fedorov	Civic Platform	5,626	1.64%
Igor Komov	People's Freedom Party	4,753	1.38%
Viktor Motorny	Rodina	4,174	1.22%
Total		343,198	100%

=== 2019 ===
Summary of the 8 September 2019 by-election in the Oryol constituency
Candidate	Party	Votes	%
Olga Pilipenko	United Russia	152,073	53.62%
Ivan Dynkovich	Communist Party	45,303	15.97%
Oleg Timokhin	Party of Pensioners	23,165	8.17%
Ruslan Perelygin	A Just Russia	16,724	5.90%
Roman Neverov	Liberal Democratic Party	12,929	4.56%
Valery Chudo	Yabloko	10,169	3.59%
Mikhail Orlov	Communists of Russia	9,909	3.50%
Sergey Kuznetsov	Rodina	5,281	1.86%
Total		283,631	100%

=== 2021 ===
Summary of the 17-19 September 2021 Russian legislative election in the Oryol constituency
Candidate	Party	Votes	%
Olga Pilipenko (incumbent)	United Russia	110,969	36.51%
Vasily Ikonnikov	Communist Party	52,299	17.21%
Ruslan Perelygin	A Just Russia — For Truth	37,805	12.44%
Svetlana Kovaleva	New People	20,175	6.64%
Raisa Yevdokimova	Party of Pensioners	18,717	6.16%
Nikita Zakharenko	Communists of Russia	17,333	5.70%
Vladislav Chislov	Liberal Democratic Party	14,741	4.85%
Nikolay Volkov	Civic Platform	9,665	3.18%
Sergey Mosin	Party of Growth	5,288	1.74%
Total		303,943	100%

=== 2026 ===
Summary of the 18-20 September 2026 Russian legislative election in the Oryol constituency
Candidate	Party	Votes	%
Aleksandr Biryukov	United Russia	130,133	41.26%
Ivan Dynkovich	Communist Party	53,534	16.97%
Ruslan Perelygin	A Just Russia	42,459	13.46%
Sergey Pochtaryov	New People	27,876	8.84%
Vladislav Chislov	Liberal Democratic Party	20,618	6.54%
Ivan Ustinov	Party of Pensioners	13,254	4.20%
Mikhail Grachev	The Greens	10,591	3.36%
Nikolay Pavelko	Rodina	4,826	1.53%
Total		315,386	100%
