= Nikolay Kovalev =

Nikolay Kovalev may refer to:

- Nikolay Kovalyov (politician) (1949–2019), Russian politician
- Nikolay Kovalev (fencer) (born 1986), Russian sabre fencer
