= Ivan Mosyakin =

Russian politician (1947–2022)

Member of the State Duma
- In office 29 December 2003 – 2 April 2007

Chairman of the Oryol Oblast Council of People's Deputies
- In office 21 March 2007 – 27 May 2011
- Preceded by: Nikolay Volodin
- Succeeded by: Aleksandr Labeykin

Personal details
- Born: Ivan Yakovlevich Mosyakin; 1 July 1947 Voronino, Dmitrovsky District, Oryol Oblast, Russian SFSR, Soviet Union
- Died: 4 June 2022 (aged 74) Oryol, Russia
- Party: CPSU; Our Home – Russia; United Russia
- Education: Oryol State University

Ivan Yakovlevich Mosyakin (Russian: Иван Яковлевич Мосякин; 1 July 1947 – 4 June 2022) was a Russian politician. A member of Our Home – Russia and later United Russia, he served in the State Duma from 2003 to 2007.

He died in Oryol on 4 June 2022 at the age of 74.
