= Artyom Kiryanov =

Russian politician

- Артём Кирьянов
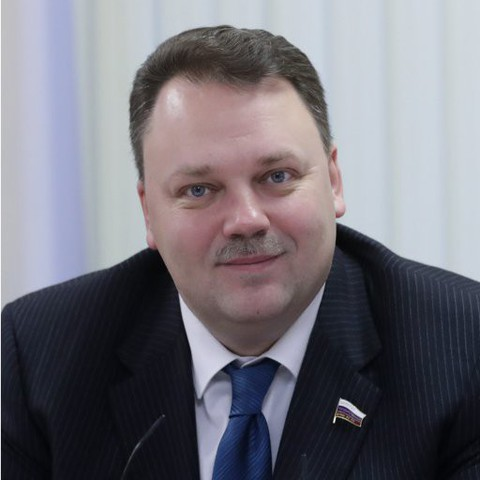
- Kiryanov in 2021

Member of the State Duma for Novgorod Oblast
- Incumbent
- Assumed office 12 October 2021
- Preceded by: Yury Bobryshev
- Constituency: Novgorod-at-large (No. 134)

Personal details
- Born: 12 January 1977 (age 49) Novgorod, Russian SFSR, USSR
- Party: United Russia
- Education: Herzen University; Russian State University for the Humanities

Artyom Yurievich Kiriyanov (Russian: Артём Юрьевич Кирьянов; born 12 January 1977) is a Russian political figure and deputy of the 8th State Duma. In 2006, he was granted a Candidate of Sciences in juridical sciences degree.

In 1997, Kiryanov joined the movement Our Home – Russia. From 1990 to 2006, he worked at the State Duma of the Russian Federation and the Federation Council. In 2009–2013, he was the vice-chairman of the Public Council of the Main Directorate of the Ministry of Internal Affairs of Russia for the Moscow Region. In 2009, he also was appointed head of the Youth Lawyers Union of the Russian Federation. From 2014 to 2021, Kiryanov was a member of the Civic Chamber of the Russian Federation. Since September 2021, he has served as deputy of the 8th State Duma from the Novgorod Oblast constituency.

In October 2022, Kiryanov proposed creating a government agency to distribute pirated films, stating that Russia needed a centralized body to collect “content without any copyright payments or respect for intellectual property.”

In April 2023, he complained that he was unable to change his photograph on Wikipedia: “I couldn’t create a page on Wikipedia. But when I became a deputy, someone else created a page about me. There are no lies there yet, but the photograph is very unfortunate, and I can’t change it in any way.”

He later admitted that he supports the idea of blocking Wikipedia, but does not have the authority to implement it.
