= Novgorod constituency =

Russian legislative constituency in Novgorod Oblast

Novgorod single-member constituency
- Constituency of the Russian State Duma

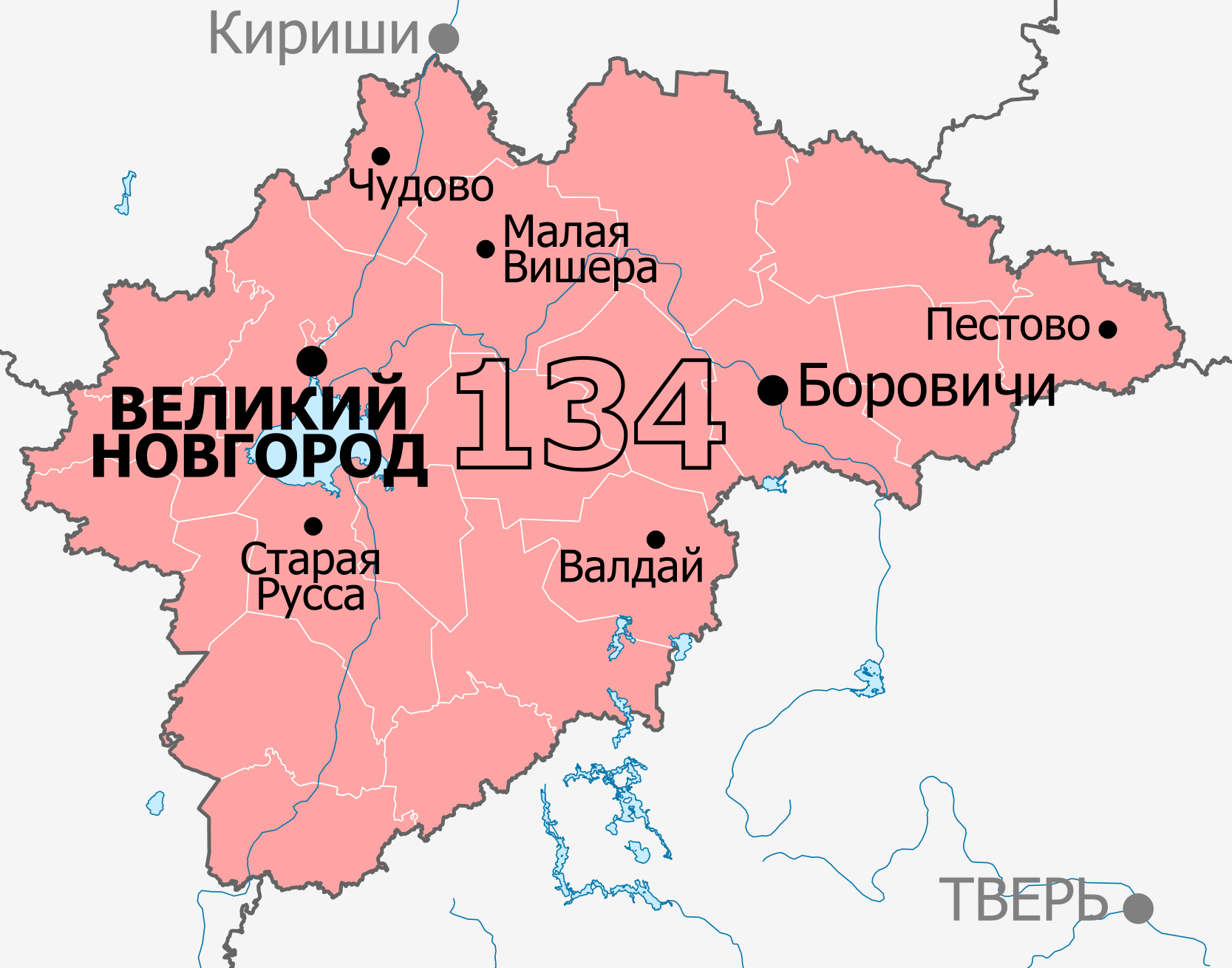
- Deputy: Artyom Kiryanov; United Russia
- Federal subject: Novgorod Oblast
- Districts: Batetsky, Borovichi, Borovichsky, Chudovsky, Demyansky, Kholmsky, Khvoyninsky, Krestetsky, Lyubytinsky, Malovishersky, Maryovsky, Moshenskoy, Novgorodsky, Okulovsky, Parfinsky, Pestovsky, Poddorsky, Shimsky, Soletsky, Staraya Russa, Starorussky, Valdaysky, Veliky Novgorod, Volotovsky
- Voters: 465,156 (2026)

The Novgorod constituency (No.136 (Note: No.123 in 1993-2007, No.134 in 2016–2026)) is a Russian legislative constituency in Novgorod Oblast. The constituency encompasses the entire territory of Novgorod Oblast.

The constituency has been represented since 2021 by United Russia deputy Artyom Kiryanov, former Member of Civic Chamber of the Russian Federation and attorney, who won the open seat, succeeding one-term United Russia incumbent Yury Bobryshev.

== Boundaries ==
1993–2007, 2016–present: Batetsky District, Borovichi, Borovichsky District, Chudovsky District, Demyansky District, Kholmsky District, Khvoyninsky District, Krestetsky District, Lyubytinsky District, Malovishersky District, Maryovsky District, Moshenskoy District, Novgorodsky District, Okulovsky District, Parfinsky District, Pestovsky District, Poddorsky District, Shimsky District, Soletsky District, Staraya Russa, Starorussky District, Valdaysky District, Veliky Novgorod, Volotovsky District
The constituency has been covering the entirety of Novgorod Oblast since its initial creation in 1993.

== Members elected ==
Election	Member	Party
1993	Oleg Ochin	Party of Russian Unity and Accord
1995	Yevgeny Zelenov	Independent
1999	Yevgeny Zelenov	Independent
2003	Aleksandr Filippov (Note: appointed as Deputy Governor of Novgorod Oblast in September 2007)	Independent
2007	Proportional representation - no election by constituency	
2011	Proportional representation - no election by constituency	
2016	Aleksandr Korovnikov (Note: died in August 2018)	United Russia
2019	Yury Bobryshev	United Russia
2021	Artyom Kiryanov	United Russia
2026	Artyom Kiryanov	United Russia

== Election results ==
=== 1993 ===
Summary of the 12 December 1993 Russian legislative election in the Novgorod constituency
Candidate	Party	Votes	%
Oleg Ochin	Party of Russian Unity and Accord	96,343	29.41%
Leonid Dyakonov	Independent	74,767	22.82%
Kirill Voronin	Democratic Party	58,174	17.76%
against all		72,813	22.26%
Total		327,620	100%

=== 1995 ===
Summary of the 17 December 1995 Russian legislative election in the Novgorod constituency
Candidate	Party	Votes	%
Yevgeny Zelenov	Independent	99,330	26.44%
Nikolay Bindyukov	Communist Party	52,464	13.96%
Anatoly Kuznetsov	Independent	50,730	13.50%
Natalya Malakhatkina	Women of Russia	39,843	10.61%
Aleksandr Terentyev	Party of Russian Unity and Accord	39,137	10.42%
Vladimir Kondratyev	Liberal Democratic Party	37,286	9.92%
against all		42,032	11.19%
Total		375,690	100%

=== 1999 ===
Summary of the 19 December 1999 Russian legislative election in the Novgorod constituency
Candidate	Party	Votes	%
Yevgeny Zelenov (incumbent)	Independent	115,454	32.43%
Gennady Burbulis	Independent	88,411	24.83%
Nikolay Bindyukov	Communist Party	48,478	13.62%
Aleksandr Kostyukhin	Yabloko	21,660	6.08%
Vladimir Ulyanov	Union of Right Forces	19,058	5.35%
Nadezhda Lisitsyna	Andrey Nikolayev and Svyatoslav Fyodorov Bloc	11,731	3.30%
Gennady Khrolenko	Independent	6,684	1.88%
Viktor Berkunov	Independent	6,287	1.77%
Viktor Kukushkin	Independent	3,819	1.07%
Gennady Ignatyev	Independent	3,571	1.00%
Vyacheslav Borovkov	Spiritual Heritage	1,537	0.43%
against all		24,560	6.90%
Total		355,999	100%

=== 2003 ===
Results by district: Aleksandr Filippov: 30–40% 40–50% 50–60% 70–80%; Yevgeny Zelenov: 30–40% 40–50%; Valery Gaydym: 20–30%

Summary of the 7 December 2003 Russian legislative election in the Novgorod constituency
Candidate	Party	Votes	%
Aleksandr Filippov	Independent	98,276	35.43%
Yevgeny Zelenov (incumbent)	United Russia	69,259	24.97%
Valery Gaydym	Communist Party	40,801	14.71%
Nikolay Tikhomirov	Party of Russia's Rebirth-Russian Party of Life	14,825	5.34%
Vladimir Dugenets	Independent	8,673	3.13%
Tatyana Ivanova	Liberal Democratic Party	8,499	3.06%
Nikolay Velichansky	Yabloko	6,631	2.39%
Irina Lebedeva	Union of Right Forces	5,724	2.06%
Aleksandr Khudyakov	United Russian Party Rus'	1,119	0.40%
Oleg Nikitin	Great Russia–Eurasian Union	767	0.28%
against all		20,060	7.23%
Total		277,528	100%

=== 2016 ===
Summary of the 18 September 2016 Russian legislative election in the Novgorod constituency
Candidate	Party	Votes	%
Aleksandr Korovnikov	United Russia	75,284	37.33%
Aleksey Afanasyev	A Just Russia	33,067	16.39%
Sergey Boyarov	Liberal Democratic Party	23,531	11.67%
Andrey Shustrov	Communist Party	22,495	11.15%
Yevgeny Bogdanov	Party of Growth	12,624	6.26%
Vyacheslav Ivanov	Communists of Russia	12,557	6.23%
Konstantin Khivrich	Yabloko	7,212	3.58%
Sergey Dobrovolsky	People's Freedom Party	4,031	2.00%
Nikolay Stolyarov	Civic Platform	2,178	1.08%
Total		201,669	100%

=== 2019 ===
Summary of the 8 September 2019 by-election in the Novgorod constituency
Candidate	Party	Votes	%
Yury Bobryshev	United Russia	40,293	35.39%
Nina Ostanina	Communist Party	23,154	20.33%
Dmitry Ignatov	A Just Russia	14,745	12.95%
Anna Cherepanova	Yabloko	9,153	8.04%
Aleksey Chursinov	Liberal Democratic Party	7,366	6.47%
Olga Yefimova	Communist Party of Social Justice	6,144	5.40%
Aleksandr Grishin	Party of Pensioners	3,621	3.18%
Dmitry Perevyazkin	Communists of Russia	2,483	2.18%
Dmitry Tarasov	Party of Growth	2,131	1.87%
Total		113,865	100%

=== 2021 ===
Summary of the 17-19 September 2021 Russian legislative election in the Novgorod constituency
Candidate	Party	Votes	%
Artyom Kiryanov	United Russia	53,243	27.18%
Aleksey Afanasyev	A Just Russia — For Truth	35,997	18.38%
Nikita Makarevich	Communist Party	30,376	15.51%
Aleksey Chursinov	Liberal Democratic Party	14,395	7.35%
Ilya Prikhodko	New People	12,895	6.58%
Nikolay Zakharov	Party of Pensioners	12,676	6.47%
Anna Cherepanova	Yabloko	11,462	5.85%
Dmitry Perevyazkin	Communists of Russia	8,823	4.50%
Yelena Maksimova	The Greens	6,709	3.43%
Total		195,880	100%

=== 2026 ===
Summary of the 18-20 September 2026 Russian legislative election in the Novgorod constituency
Candidate	Party	Votes	%
Artyom Kiryanov (incumbent)	United Russia	66,459	32.74%
Olga Yefimova	Communist Party	34,421	16.96%
Nikolay Bezverkhov	Liberal Democratic Party	19,347	9.53%
Ilya Prikhodko	New People	18,263	9.00%
Alla Khoroshevskaya	A Just Russia	17,721	8.73%
Viktor Shalyakin	Yabloko	13,311	6.56%
Sergey Zubarev	Party of Pensioners	11,183	5.51%
Vladislav Bazylnikov	Communists of Russia	9,416	4.64%
Yelena Maksimova	The Greens	6,405	3.16%
Total		202,980	100%
