= Dmitrovsky District, Oryol Oblast =

Dmitrovsky District Дмитровский район (Russian)
- District
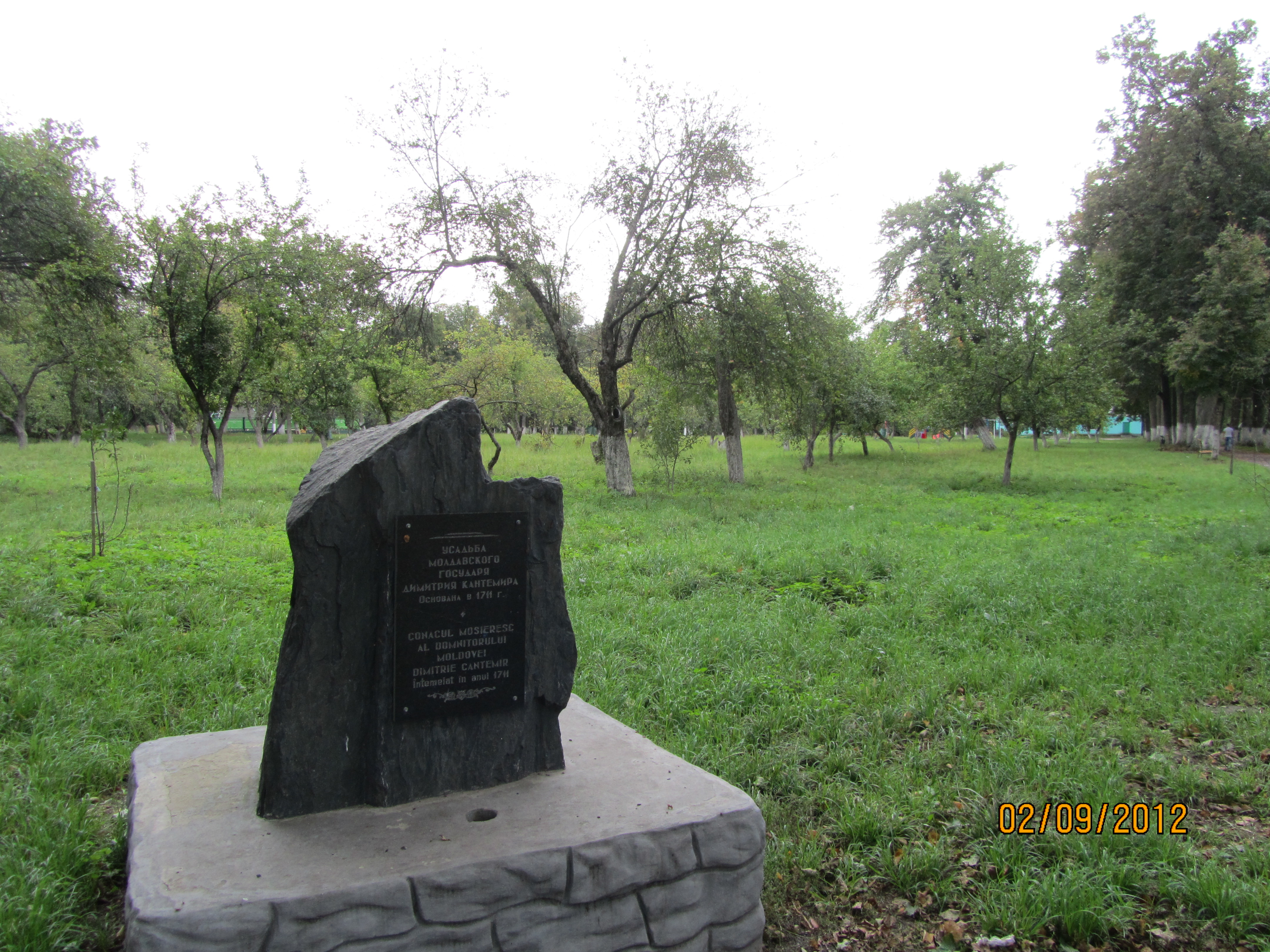
- Kantemir Estate, Dmitrovsky District

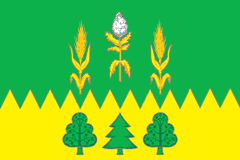
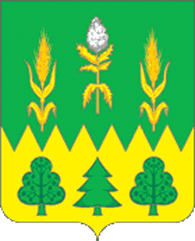
- Flag Coat of arms
- Location of Dmitrovsky District in Oryol Oblast
- Coordinates: 52°30′N 35°09′E
- Country: Russia
- Federal subject: Oryol Oblast
- Established: 30 July 1928
- Administrative center: Dmitrovsk

Area
  - Total: 1,249.8 km^{2} (482.6 sq mi)

Population (2010 Census)
  - Total: 12,196
  - Density: 9.7584/km^{2} (25.274/sq mi)
  - Urban: 46.3%
  - Rural: 53.7%

Administrative structure
  - Administrative divisions: 1 Towns of district significance, 12 Selsoviets
  - Inhabited localities: 1 cities/towns, 127 rural localities

Municipal structure
  - Municipally incorporated as: Dmitrovsky Municipal District
  - Municipal divisions: 1 urban settlements, 12 rural settlements
- Time zone: UTC+3 (MSK)
- OKTMO ID: 54612000
- Website: http://dmitrovsk-orel.ru/

Dmitrovsky District (Russian: Дмитровский райо́н) is an administrative and municipal district (raion), one of the twenty-four in Oryol Oblast, Russia. It is located in the southwest of the oblast. The area of the district is 1,249.8 square kilometers (482.6 sq mi). Its administrative center is the town of Dmitrovsk. Population: 12,196 (2010 Census); 15,841 (2002 census); 18,217 (1989 Soviet census). The population of Dmitrovsk accounts for 46.3% of the district's total population.

== Notable residents ==
- Saul Abramzon (1905–1977), ethnographer, born in Dmitrovsk
- Ivan Mosyakin (1947–2022), politician, born in Voronino
