= Nikolay Kovalyov (politician) =

Russian politician (1949–2019)

- Николай Ковалёв
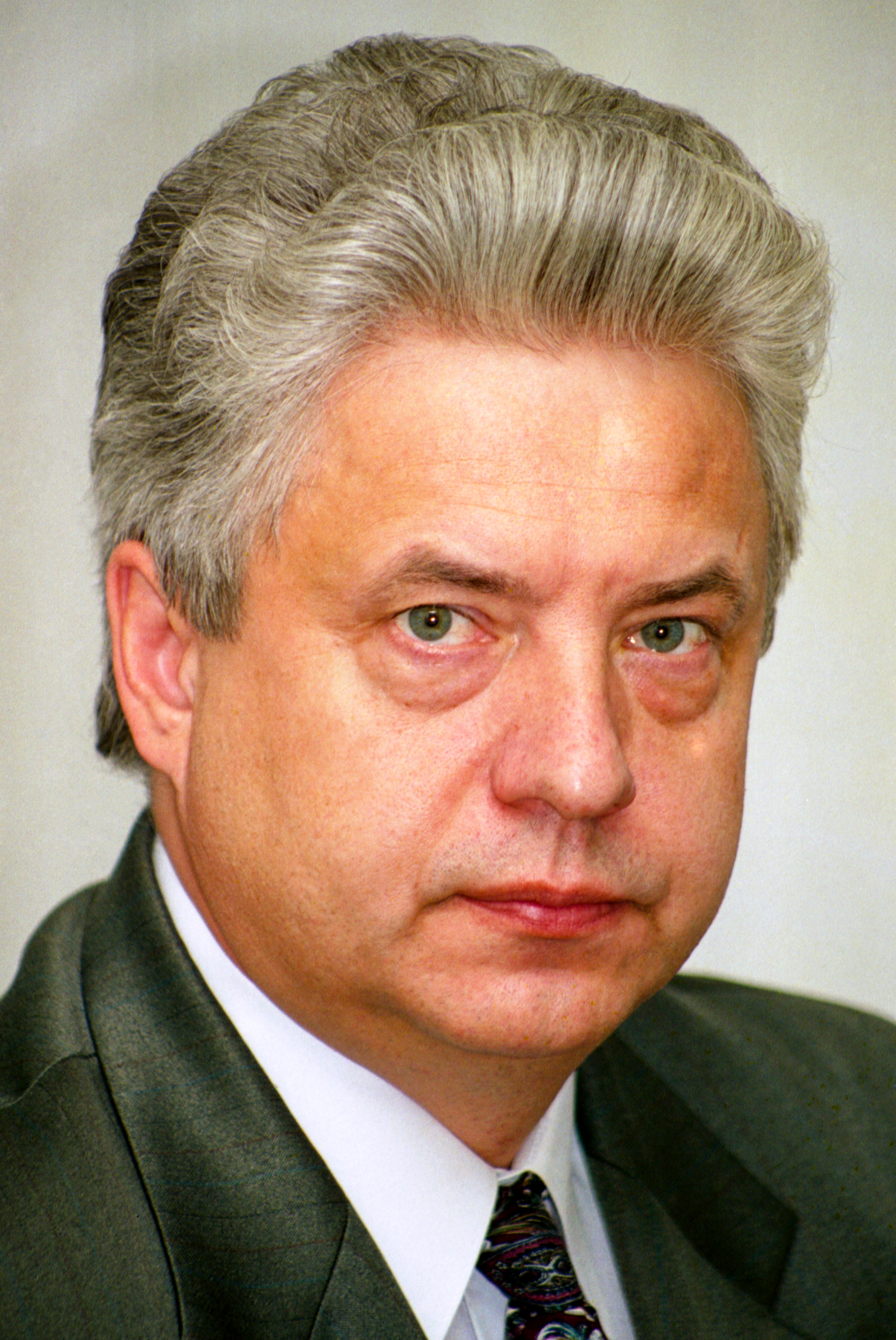
- Kovalyov in 1999

Member of the State Duma for Oryol Oblast
- In office 5 October 2016 – 5 April 2019
- Preceded by: constituency re-established
- Succeeded by: Olga Pilipenko
- Constituency: Oryol (No. 145)

Member of the State Duma (Party List Seat)
- In office 29 December 2003 – 5 October 2016

Member of the State Duma for Moscow
- In office 18 January 2000 – 29 December 2003
- Preceded by: Andrey Makarov
- Succeeded by: Sergey Osadchy
- Constituency: Sheremetyevo (No. 205)

Director of the Federal Security Service
- In office 20 June 1996 – 25 July 1998
- President: Boris Yeltsin
- Preceded by: Mikhail Barsukov
- Succeeded by: Vladimir Putin

Personal details
- Born: Nikolay Dmitrievich Kovalyov; 6 August 1949 Moscow, Russian SFSR, Soviet Union
- Died: 5 April 2019 (aged 69) Moscow, Russia
- Party: United Russia
- Children: 2
- Education: Moscow Institute of Electronic Machine Building (MIEM)

Military service
- Allegiance: Soviet Union; Russian Federation
- Branch/service: KGB FSB
- Years of service: 1974–1998
- Rank: Army General
- Battles/wars: Soviet–Afghan War

Nikolay Dmitrievich Kovalyov (Russian: Николай Дмитриевич Ковалёв; 6 August 1949 – 5 April 2019) was a Russian politician. Deputy of the State Duma of the Federal Assembly of the Russian Federation of the 3rd, 4th, 5th, 6th, and 7th convocations (1999–2019), where he chaired the Duma's Veterans' Committee. Kovalyov was the Director of the FSB from July 1996 to July 1998, when he was succeeded by Vladimir Putin.

== Biography ==
Nikolay Kovalyov joined the KGB in 1974. He was appointed General of the Army in 1997. In 1999 he was elected a deputy to the State Duma of the Russian Federation.

He said in 1996: "There has never been such a number of spies arrested by us since the time when German agents were sent in during the years of World War II." He also publicly speculated that Boris Berezovsky might be involved in the death of Alexander Litvinenko.

During the Bronze Soldier Controversy in 2007, Kovalyov led a "fact finding mission" to Estonia, where the authorities were relocating a World War II memorial, including a two meter tall bronze soldier in a Soviet uniform. Before leaving Moscow, Kovalyov asked Estonia's government to step down. The two-day visit by the delegation, originally set up to defuse a diplomatic dispute over the Bronze Soldier statue, only appeared to have escalated the feud, with the Estonian foreign minister and other Government officials refusing to meet with Kovalyov's delegation.

== Honours and awards ==
- Order of Merit for the Fatherland;
  - 3rd (20 April 2006) for outstanding contribution to law-making and long-term diligent work
  - 4th class
- Order of Military Merit
- Order of the Red Star
- Medal for Merits in perpetuating the memory of the fallen defenders of the Fatherland (Russian Ministry of Defence, 2008) for his great personal contribution to the commemoration of the fallen defenders of the Fatherland, the establishment of names of the dead and the fate of missing servicemen, displaying high moral and business qualities, diligence and intelligent initiative, to assist in the task of perpetuating the memory of the fallen defenders of the Fatherland
- Diploma of the Russian Federation President (9 January 2010) for services in legislative activities and the development of Russian parliamentarism

== See also ==
- List of members of the State Duma of Russia who died in office

| Preceded by Mikhail Barsukov | Director of FSB; July 9, 1996 – July 25, 1998 | Succeeded by Vladimir Putin |
