= Olga Pilipenko =

Russian politician

- Ольга Пилипенко
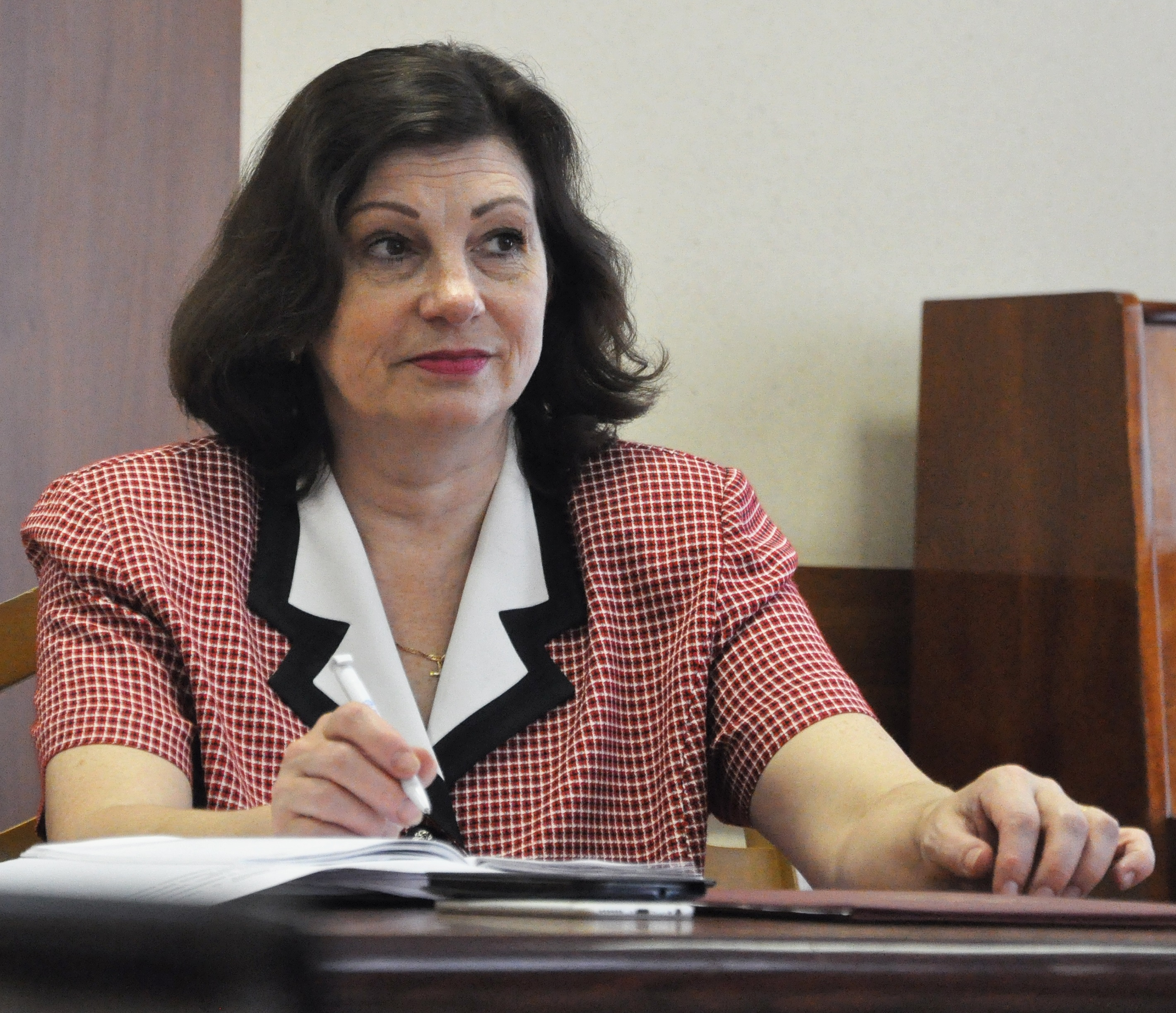

Member of the State Duma for Oryol Oblast
- Incumbent
- Assumed office 17 September 2019
- Preceded by: Nikolay Kovalyov
- Constituency: Oryol-at-large (No. 145)

Personal details
- Born: 4 January 1966 (age 60) Oryol, Russian SFSR, USSR
- Party: United Russia
- Education: All-Union Correspondence Mechanical Engineering Institute
- Website: Pilipenko.org

Olga Vasilievna Pilipenko (Russian: Ольга Васильевна Пилипенко; born 4 January 1966, Oryol) is a Russian political figure and a deputy of the 7th and 8th State Dumas. In 1998, she was granted a Candidate of Sciences in Technical sciences degree.

After graduating from university, Pilipenko began working at the Oryol's branch of the Moscow State University of Instrument Engineering and Computer Science (renamed Oryol State Technical University in 1993). She headed the department for over 25 years, and in 2009, she became a professor. From 2013 to 2015, she worked as a dean of the State University - educational-scientific-industrial complex. In 2015, she was appointed Dean of the Prioksky State University. On 13 September 2015, she was elected a deputy of the Oryol City Council of People's Deputies of the 5th convocation. On 26 May 2019, she was elected Dean of the Oryol State University. On 8 September 2019, she was elected as a deputy of the 7th State Duma from the Oryol constituency. In 2021, she was re-elected to the 8th State Duma.

== Sanctions ==
She was sanctioned by the UK government in 2022 in relation to the Russo-Ukrainian War.
