= Orel State University =

State university in Oryol, Oryol Oblast, Russia

Orel State University named after I.S. Turgenev (OSU) (OSU)
- Орловский государственный университет (ОГУ)
- Type: Public
- Established: 1931
- Rector: Olga Pilipenko
- Students: 19,000
- Location: 95 Komsomolskaya street, Oryol, Russia; 52°57′04″N 36°03′50″E
- Campus: Urban
- Website: int.oreluniver.ru/en/
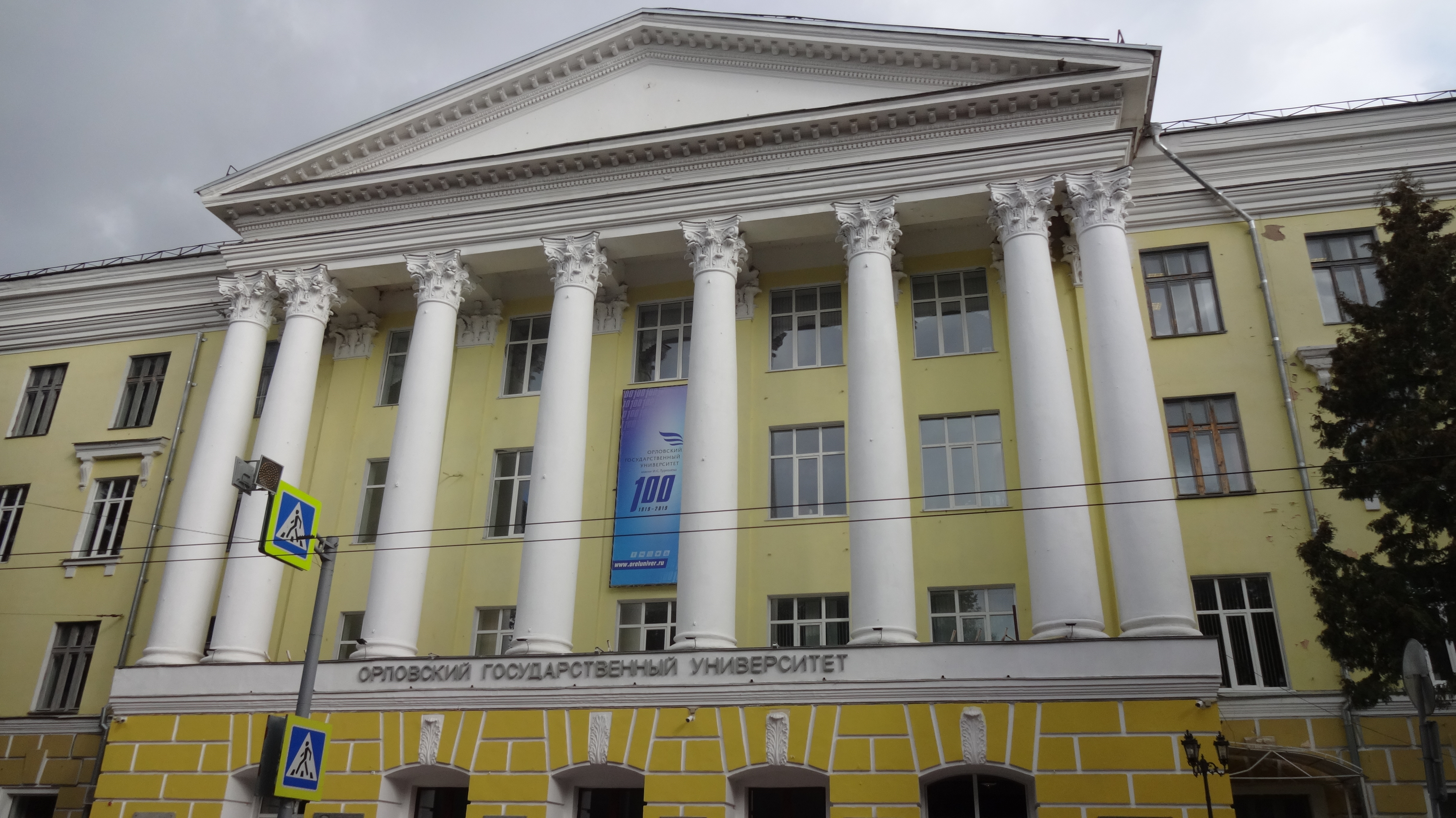

Orel State University or Turgenev State University of Oryol, officially Orel State University named after I.S. Turgenev (OSU; Russian: Орловский государственный университет имени И.С. Тургенева, Orlovskiy gosudarstvenniy universitet imeni I.S. Turgeneva; often abbreviated ОГУ, OGU), formerly Oryol State Pedagogical Institute, is a university in Central Federal district of Russia in the city Oryol (or Orel) which is the Administrative centre of Oryol Oblast (or Orel region). OSU opened in 1931 as Industrial-Pedagogical Institute. Today OSU is a member of Association of the Classical Universities of Russia.

== History ==
Orel Proletarian University named after V.I. Lenin was created on October 31, 1918, by the Decree of the Department of Public Education of the Orel Provincial Committee and which was opened on November 5 of the same year and existed in Oryol until 1920. The Board of the Orel Province Education Committee on March 19, 1920, passed the resolution "On the reorganization of the Orel proletarian university" and on the establishment of Orel State University on its base and the Institute of Public Education.

The Council of People's Commissars on November 4, 1921, has adopted a decree to establish a Higher Pedagogical Institute on the basis of OSU. Its formal opening ceremony took place on October 9, 1921. However, the further course of the country's leadership on the specialization of higher education led to the decision of November 15, 1922, on the closure of the Orel Higher Pedagogical Institute. The students were transferred to other universities and technical schools, and the teaching staff of the university moved to work at Orel Pedagogical and Mechanical-Building Technical School.

In 1927 there were created groups for the training of engineers in the Mechanics and Construction Technical College in parallel with the groups for the training of specialists with secondary education. On August 5, 1931, Industrial and Pedagogical Institute was founded in Oryol by the decree of the Council of People's Commissars of the Russian SFSR. Its formal opening ceremony was held on October 16, 1931. In 1932 the Workers' Faculty and Evening Institute was opened at the OSPI (until 1938). In January 1933 Belgorod Pedagogical Institute was consolidated with OSPI.

Since 1934 (September 1) there were two Institutes (Teacher's Institute with two-year term of training and Pedagogical Institute, with four-year term of training which trained teachers for secondary schools) in the structure of OSPI. In the period of retention of this structure until 1952, University was called Orel State Pedagogical and Teachers' Institute, keeping the name Orel Pedagogical Institute in the press and internal turnover documents. The Workers' Faculty and Model School (until 1949) were founded in the framework of the OSU in 1920.

Further development of the OSPI was determined by the Great Patriotic War. In June 1941 200 students and teachers left the Institute for the front. On August 23, 1941, by the order of the People's Commissariat of Education of the RSFSR OSPI was evacuated to Birsk in the Bashkir ASSR, where the teacher's technical school was created by the Birsk State Pedagogical Institute, which retained the structure of the Orel Pedagogical Institute. On November 20, 1943, by order of the Council of People's Commissars of the RSFSR OSPI was re-evacuated to Yelets, and in August 1944 returned to Oryol.

In 1952 Teacher’s institute of Orel Pedagogical and Teacher's Institute was closed, and it was renamed Orel State Pedagogical Institute. On April 21, 1988, the Orel Branch of VZMI was reorganized into the Orel Branch of the Moscow Institute of Instrument Engineering (OB MIIE), on May 17, 1993, into Orel State Polytechnic Institute, and on March 14, 1995, Orel State Polytechnic Institute was renamed the Orel State Technical University.

In 1994 OSPI received the status of the Pedagogical University (Orel State Pedagogical University, OSPU) and in 1996 was transformed into a classical university. On June 6 of the same year Educational and Research and Production Complex (UNPK) was created on the basis of Orel State Technical University.

On November 25, 2010, Orel State Technical University was renamed State University - Educational-Research and Production Complex, and in 2015 it was renamed Prioksky State University.

In the same year the decision of the Government of the Russian Federation was taken to establish Key University in Orel region, in accordance with which in 2016 (April 1), the Orel State University named after I.S. Turgenev was established on the basis of tow Universities as Key institution.

== Oryol State University Today ==
Orel State University named after I.S. Turgenev is the first Key University in Russia.

To date, the structure of the university is represented by 3 branches (Karachev, Livny and Mtsensk), 12 institutes and 13 faculties. This is 297 educational programs and more than 940 doctors and candidates of science teaching. About 19,000 students from 55 countries study at our University; more than 4,000 students are graduated annually. The university consists of:

- Center for Attracting Talented Youth;
- Center for Advanced Continuing Education;
- Center for Innovative Development of the Region.

Membership of the university and individual scientists in specialized associations:

- The CDIO / CDIO Initiative
- International Association for Continuing Education;
- Network of language partners of the French Embassy;
- Association of Foreign Students of Russia;
- Association of Russian-Azerbaijani Universities.

Academic Mobility Programs:

- Erasmus Mundus;
- Jean Monnet;
- DAAD.

Sport is an integral part of student life.

Students of Key University take part in various international conferences, such as:

- Participation in the International Conference on Photonics "European Conference on Biomedical Optics" (Munich, Germany);
- Participation in the II International Conference "Tourism Dynamics and Trends" (University of Seville, Spain).
- Participation in the Summer School on Photonics and Optics (Oulu, Finland)

In addition, Key higher educational institution itself becomes a venue for international conferences and seminars:

- Seminar on the international Erasmus+ programme and academic mobility;
- International scientific and practical conference on the basis of the Institute of Economics and Management, etc.

The university is visited by foreign delegations from all over the world: France, United States, Iran, Vietnam, Armenia and others.

== Departments ==
OSU has 12 institutes and 13 faculties:

1. Law Institute;
2. Architectural and Construction Institute;
3. Institute of Instrument Engineering, Automation and Information Technologies;
4. Institute of Natural Sciences and Biotechnology;
5. Institute of Correspondence and Part-Time Education;
6. "Academy of Physical Culture and Sports" Faculty;
7. Polikarpov Polytechnic Institute;
8. Faculty of Secondary Vocational Education;
9. Faculty of Pre-University Education and Career Guidance;
10. Faculty for Foreign Students’ Training;
11. Faculty of Higher Qualification Expert Training;
12. Faculty of Physics and Mathematics;
13. Faculty of Philosophy;
14. Institute of Philology;
15. Social Faculty;
16. Institute of Pedagogy and Psychology;
17. Medical Institute;
18. Medical Faculty;
19. Faculty of Pediatrics, Dentistry and Pharmacy;
20. Art and Graphic Faculty;
21. Faculty of Technology, Entrepreneurship and Service;
22. Institute of Foreign Languages;
23. Faculty of History;
24. Center for Continuing Professional Education and Upgrade Training;
25. Institute of Economics and Management.

== Degree mill ==
According to the investigation by Dissernet the university has awarded numerous (>85) degrees based on heavily plagiarised theses. On April 18, 2011, An anticorruption body was formed at Oryol state university called Turgenev and it follows a professional code of ethics which was approved on 25 December 2014 in an effort to fight against corruption.
