= Nikolsky (inhabited locality) =

Nikolsky (Russian: Нико́льский; masculine), Nikolskaya (Нико́льская; feminine), or Nikolskoye (Нико́льское; neuter) is the name of several inhabited localities in Russia.

== Modern localities ==
=== Altai Krai ===
As of 2010, three rural localities in Altai Krai bear this name:

- Nikolsky, Altai Krai, a settlement in Borisovsky Selsoviet of Zalesovsky District
- Nikolskoye, Altaysky District, Altai Krai, a selo in Kuyagansky Selsoviet of Altaysky District
- Nikolskoye, Sovetsky District, Altai Krai, a selo in Nikolsky Selsoviet of Sovetsky District

=== Altai Republic ===
As of 2010, one rural locality in the Altai Republic bears this name:

- Nikolskoye, Altai Republic, a selo in Karakokshinskoye Rural Settlement of Choysky District

=== Amur Oblast ===
As of 2010, one rural locality in Amur Oblast bears this name:

- Nikolskoye, Amur Oblast, a selo in Nikolsky Rural Settlement of Belogorsky District

=== Arkhangelsk Oblast ===
As of 2010, five rural localities in Arkhangelsk Oblast bear this name:

- Nikolskoye, Arkhangelsk Oblast, a village in Lisestrovsky Selsoviet of Primorsky District
- Nikolskaya, Krasnoborsky District, Arkhangelsk Oblast, a village in Verkhneuftyugsky Selsoviet of Krasnoborsky District
- Nikolskaya, Mikhaylovsky Selsoviet, Shenkursky District, Arkhangelsk Oblast, a village in Mikhaylovsky Selsoviet of Shenkursky District
- Nikolskaya, Rovdinsky Selsoviet, Shenkursky District, Arkhangelsk Oblast, a village in Rovdinsky Selsoviet of Shenkursky District
- Nikolskaya, Velsky District, Arkhangelsk Oblast, a village in Khozminsky Selsoviet of Velsky District

=== Astrakhan Oblast ===
As of 2010, two rural localities in Astrakhan Oblast bear this name:

- Nikolskoye, Kamyzyaksky District, Astrakhan Oblast, a selo in Nikolo-Komarovsky Selsoviet of Kamyzyaksky District
- Nikolskoye, Yenotayevsky District, Astrakhan Oblast, a selo in Nikolsky Selsoviet of Yenotayevsky District

=== Republic of Bashkortostan ===
As of 2010, nine rural localities in the Republic of Bashkortostan bear this name:

- Nikolsky, Ufa, Republic of Bashkortostan, a settlement in Novocherkassky Selsoviet of the city of republic significance of Ufa
- Nikolsky, Birsk, Republic of Bashkortostan, a village under the administrative jurisdiction of the town of republic significance of Birsk
- Nikolskoye, Aurgazinsky District, Republic of Bashkortostan, a selo in Ismagilovsky Selsoviet of Aurgazinsky District
- Nikolskoye, Blagoveshchensky District, Republic of Bashkortostan, a village in Ilyino-Polyansky Selsoviet of Blagoveshchensky District
- Nikolskoye, Buzdyaksky District, Republic of Bashkortostan, a selo in Gafuriysky Selsoviet of Buzdyaksky District
- Nikolskoye, Krasnokamsky District, Republic of Bashkortostan, a selo in Nikolsky Selsoviet of Krasnokamsky District
- Nikolskoye, Miyakinsky District, Republic of Bashkortostan, a village in Miyakinsky Selsoviet of Miyakinsky District
- Nikolskoye, Nurimanovsky District, Republic of Bashkortostan, a selo in Nikolsky Selsoviet of Nurimanovsky District
- Nikolskoye, Sterlibashevsky District, Republic of Bashkortostan, a village in Sterlibashevsky Selsoviet of Sterlibashevsky District

=== Belgorod Oblast ===
As of 2010, seven rural localities in Belgorod Oblast bear this name:

- Nikolsky, Borisovsky District, Belgorod Oblast, a khutor in Khotmyzhsky Rural Okrug of Borisovsky District
- Nikolsky, Korochansky District, Belgorod Oblast, a khutor in Korochansky District
- Nikolsky, Krasnogvardeysky District, Belgorod Oblast, a settlement in Krasnogvardeysky District
- Nikolsky, Rakityansky District, Belgorod Oblast, a khutor in Nizhnepensky Rural Okrug of Rakityansky District
- Nikolskoye, Belgorodsky District, Belgorod Oblast, a selo in Belgorodsky District
- Nikolskoye, Novooskolsky District, Belgorod Oblast, a selo in Novooskolsky District
- Nikolskoye, Shebekinsky District, Belgorod Oblast, a selo in Shebekinsky District

=== Bryansk Oblast ===
As of 2010, four rural localities in Bryansk Oblast bear this name:

- Nikolsky, Sevsky District, Bryansk Oblast, a settlement in Khinelsky Selsoviet of Sevsky District
- Nikolsky, Surazhsky District, Bryansk Oblast, a settlement in Kulazhsky Selsoviet of Surazhsky District
- Nikolsky, Vygonichsky District, Bryansk Oblast, a settlement under the administrative jurisdiction of Vygonichi Settlement Council of Vygonichsky District
- Nikolsky, Zhiryatinsky District, Bryansk Oblast, a khutor in Zhiryatinsky Selsoviet of Zhiryatinsky District

=== Chelyabinsk Oblast ===
As of 2010, two rural localities in Chelyabinsk Oblast bear this name:

- Nikolsky, Chelyabinsk Oblast, a settlement in Zlokazovsky Selsoviet of Kusinsky District
- Nikolskoye, Chelyabinsk Oblast, a selo in Sokolovsky Selsoviet of Uysky District

=== Chuvash Republic ===
As of 2010, two rural localities in the Chuvash Republic bear this name:

- Nikolskoye, Poretsky District, Chuvash Republic, a village in Siyavskoye Rural Settlement of Poretsky District
- Nikolskoye, Yadrinsky District, Chuvash Republic, a selo in Ivankovskoye Rural Settlement of Yadrinsky District

=== Ivanovo Oblast ===
As of 2010, four rural localities in Ivanovo Oblast bear this name:

- Nikolskoye, Furmanovsky District, Ivanovo Oblast, a selo in Furmanovsky District
- Nikolskoye, Ilyinsky District, Ivanovo Oblast, a selo in Ilyinsky District
- Nikolskoye, Ivanovsky District, Ivanovo Oblast, a selo in Ivanovsky District
- Nikolskoye, Komsomolsky District, Ivanovo Oblast, a selo in Komsomolsky District

=== Kaliningrad Oblast ===
As of 2010, one rural locality in Kaliningrad Oblast bears this name:

- Nikolskoye, Kaliningrad Oblast, a settlement in Alekseyevsky Rural Okrug of Krasnoznamensky District

=== Kaluga Oblast ===
As of 2010, thirteen rural localities in Kaluga Oblast bear this name:

- Nikolsky, Kaluga Oblast, a settlement in Kuybyshevsky District
- Nikolskoye, Babyninsky District, Kaluga Oblast, a selo in Babyninsky District
- Nikolskoye (Starki Rural Settlement), Dzerzhinsky District, Kaluga Oblast, a village in Dzerzhinsky District; municipally, a part of Starki Rural Settlement of that district
- Nikolskoye (Ugorskaya Rural Settlement), Dzerzhinsky District, Kaluga Oblast, a village in Dzerzhinsky District; municipally, a part of Ugorskaya Rural Settlement of that district
- Nikolskoye, Ferzikovsky District, Kaluga Oblast, a village in Ferzikovsky District
- Nikolskoye, Maloyaroslavetsky District, Kaluga Oblast, a village in Maloyaroslavetsky District
- Nikolskoye, Medynsky District, Kaluga Oblast, a selo in Medynsky District
- Nikolskoye, Meshchovsky District, Kaluga Oblast, a selo in Meshchovsky District
- Nikolskoye (selo), Peremyshlsky District, Kaluga Oblast, a selo in Peremyshlsky District
- Nikolskoye (village), Peremyshlsky District, Kaluga Oblast, a village in Peremyshlsky District
- Nikolskoye, Spas-Demensky District, Kaluga Oblast, a village in Spas-Demensky District
- Nikolskoye, Tarussky District, Kaluga Oblast, a village in Tarussky District
- Nikolskoye, Zhukovsky District, Kaluga Oblast, a selo in Zhukovsky District

=== Kamchatka Krai ===
As of 2010, one rural locality in Kamchatka Krai bears this name:

- Nikolskoye, Kamchatka Krai, a selo in Aleutsky District

=== Kirov Oblast ===
As of 2010, two rural localities in Kirov Oblast bear this name:

- Nikolsky, Kirov Oblast, a pochinok in Krasnoyarsky Rural Okrug of Nolinsky District
- Nikolskoye, Kirov Oblast, a village in Aryksky Rural Okrug of Malmyzhsky District

=== Kostroma Oblast ===
As of 2010, five rural localities in Kostroma Oblast bear this name:

- Nikolskoye, Galichsky District, Kostroma Oblast, a village in Stepanovskoye Settlement of Galichsky District
- Nikolskoye, Kotovskoye Settlement, Kostromskoy District, Kostroma Oblast, a village in Kotovskoye Settlement of Kostromskoy District
- Nikolskoye, Nikolskoye Settlement, Kostromskoy District, Kostroma Oblast, a settlement in Nikolskoye Settlement of Kostromskoy District
- Nikolskoye, Makaryevsky District, Kostroma Oblast, a settlement in Unzhenskoye Settlement of Makaryevsky District
- Nikolskoye, Nerekhtsky District, Kostroma Oblast, a village in Volzhskoye Settlement of Nerekhtsky District

=== Krasnoyarsk Krai ===
As of 2010, three rural localities in Krasnoyarsk Krai bear this name:

- Nikolskoye, Idrinsky District, Krasnoyarsk Krai, a selo in Nikolsky Selsoviet of Idrinsky District
- Nikolskoye, Uyarsky District, Krasnoyarsk Krai, a selo in Roshchinsky Selsoviet of Uyarsky District
- Nikolskoye, Yemelyanovsky District, Krasnoyarsk Krai, a selo in Nikolsky Selsoviet of Yemelyanovsky District

=== Kursk Oblast ===
As of 2010, eleven rural localities in Kursk Oblast bear this name:

- Nikolsky, Kastorensky District, Kursk Oblast, a khutor in Alekseyevsky Selsoviet of Kastorensky District
- Nikolsky, Kurchatovsky District, Kursk Oblast, a settlement in Nikolsky Selsoviet of Kurchatovsky District
- Nikolsky, Shchigrovsky District, Kursk Oblast, a settlement in Nikolsky Selsoviet of Shchigrovsky District
- Nikolsky, Sudzhansky District, Kursk Oblast, a khutor in Maloloknyansky Selsoviet of Sudzhansky District
- Nikolsky, Zheleznogorsky District, Kursk Oblast, a settlement in Volkovsky Selsoviet of Zheleznogorsky District
- Nikolskoye, Gorshechensky District, Kursk Oblast, a selo in Nikolsky Selsoviet of Gorshechensky District
- Nikolskoye, Kastorensky District, Kursk Oblast, a selo in Alekseyevsky Selsoviet of Kastorensky District
- Nikolskoye, Oktyabrsky District, Kursk Oblast, a selo in Nikolsky Selsoviet of Oktyabrsky District
- Nikolskoye, Dobro-Kolodezsky Selsoviet, Solntsevsky District, Kursk Oblast, a selo in Dobro-Kolodezsky Selsoviet of Solntsevsky District
- Nikolskoye, Ivanovsky Selsoviet, Solntsevsky District, Kursk Oblast, a selo in Ivanovsky Selsoviet of Solntsevsky District
- Nikolskoye, Zolotukhinsky District, Kursk Oblast, a selo in Tazovsky Selsoviet of Zolotukhinsky District

=== Leningrad Oblast ===
As of 2010, seven inhabited localities in Leningrad Oblast bear this name.

Urban localities

- Nikolskoye, Tosnensky District, Leningrad Oblast, a town in Tosnensky District
- Nikolsky, Leningrad Oblast, an urban-type settlement in Nikolskoye Settlement Municipal Formation of Podporozhsky District

Rural localities

- Nikolskoye, Boksitogorsky District, Leningrad Oblast, a village in Podborovskoye Settlement Municipal Formation of Boksitogorsky District
- Nikolskoye, Bolshekolpanskoye Settlement Municipal Formation, Gatchinsky District, Leningrad Oblast, a slobodka in Bolshekolpanskoye Settlement Municipal Formation of Gatchinsky District
- Nikolskoye, Vyritskoye Settlement Municipal Formation, Gatchinsky District, Leningrad Oblast, a village under the administrative jurisdiction of Vyritskoye Settlement Municipal Formation of Gatchinsky District
- Nikolskoye, Kirovsky District, Leningrad Oblast, a village under the administrative jurisdiction of Naziyevskoye Settlement Municipal Formation of Kirovsky District
- Nikolskoye, Lomonosovsky District, Leningrad Oblast, a village in Lopukhinskoye Settlement Municipal Formation of Lomonosovsky District

=== Lipetsk Oblast ===
As of 2010, fourteen rural localities in Lipetsk Oblast bear this name:

- Nikolskoye, Bratovsky Selsoviet, Chaplyginsky District, Lipetsk Oblast, a village in Bratovsky Selsoviet of Chaplyginsky District
- Nikolskoye, Troyekurovsky Selsoviet, Chaplyginsky District, Lipetsk Oblast, a selo in Troyekurovsky Selsoviet of Chaplyginsky District
- Nikolskoye, Dankovsky District, Lipetsk Oblast, a selo in Bigildinsky Selsoviet of Dankovsky District
- Nikolskoye, Dobrinsky District, Lipetsk Oblast, a selo in Khvorostyansky Selsoviet of Dobrinsky District
- Nikolskoye, Dobrovsky District, Lipetsk Oblast, a village in Yekaterinovsky Selsoviet of Dobrovsky District
- Nikolskoye, Izmalkovsky District, Lipetsk Oblast, a village in Petrovsky Selsoviet of Izmalkovsky District
- Nikolskoye, Krasninsky District, Lipetsk Oblast, a selo in Sukhodolsky Selsoviet of Krasninsky District
- Nikolskoye, Stebayevsky Selsoviet, Lipetsky District, Lipetsk Oblast, a selo in Stebayevsky Selsoviet of Lipetsky District
- Nikolskoye, Vvedensky Selsoviet, Lipetsky District, Lipetsk Oblast, a selo in Vvedensky Selsoviet of Lipetsky District
- Nikolskoye, Terbunsky District, Lipetsk Oblast, a village in Kazinsky Selsoviet of Terbunsky District
- Nikolskoye, Usmansky District, Lipetsk Oblast, a selo in Nikolsky Selsoviet of Usmansky District
- Nikolskoye, Naberezhansky Selsoviet, Volovsky District, Lipetsk Oblast, a village in Naberezhansky Selsoviet of Volovsky District
- Nikolskoye, Ozhoginsky Selsoviet, Volovsky District, Lipetsk Oblast, a village in Ozhoginsky Selsoviet of Volovsky District
- Nikolskoye, Zadonsky District, Lipetsk Oblast, a selo in Verkhnestudenetsky Selsoviet of Zadonsky District

=== Mari El Republic ===
As of 2010, one rural locality in the Mari El Republic bears this name:

- Nikolsky, Mari El Republic, a pochinok in Korkatovsky Rural Okrug of Morkinsky District

=== Republic of Mordovia ===
As of 2010, one rural locality in the Republic of Mordovia bears this name:

- Nikolskoye, Republic of Mordovia, a selo in Nikolsky Selsoviet of Torbeyevsky District

=== Moscow Oblast ===
As of 2010, eighteen rural localities in Moscow Oblast bear this name:

- Nikolskoye, Iksha, Dmitrovsky District, Moscow Oblast, a village under the administrative jurisdiction of the work settlement of Iksha in Dmitrovsky District
- Nikolskoye, Dmitrov, Dmitrovsky District, Moscow Oblast, a village under the administrative jurisdiction of the Town of Dmitrov in Dmitrovsky District
- Nikolskoye, Istrinsky District, Moscow Oblast, a village in Yermolinskoye Rural Settlement of Istrinsky District
- Nikolskoye, Klinsky District, Moscow Oblast, a village in Nudolskoye Rural Settlement of Klinsky District
- Nikolskoye, Mozhaysky District, Moscow Oblast, a village in Poretskoye Rural Settlement of Mozhaysky District
- Nikolskoye, Naro-Fominsky District, Moscow Oblast, a village in Veselevskoye Rural Settlement of Naro-Fominsky District
- Nikolskoye, Nazaryevskoye Rural Settlement, Odintsovsky District, Moscow Oblast, a village in Nazaryevskoye Rural Settlement of Odintsovsky District
- Nikolskoye, Nikolskoye Rural Settlement, Odintsovsky District, Moscow Oblast, a selo in Nikolskoye Rural Settlement of Odintsovsky District
- Nikolskoye, Podolsky District, Moscow Oblast, a selo in Voronovskoye Rural Settlement of Podolsky District
- Nikolskoye, Pushkinsky District, Moscow Oblast, a village under the administrative jurisdiction of the work settlement of Sofrino in Pushkinsky District
- Nikolskoye, Kolyubakinskoye Rural Settlement, Ruzsky District, Moscow Oblast, a selo in Kolyubakinskoye Rural Settlement of Ruzsky District
- Nikolskoye, Volkovskoye Rural Settlement, Ruzsky District, Moscow Oblast, a selo in Volkovskoye Rural Settlement of Ruzsky District
- Nikolskoye, Serebryano-Prudsky District, Moscow Oblast, a village in Uzunovskoye Rural Settlement of Serebryano-Prudsky District
- Nikolskoye, Shakhovskoy District, Moscow Oblast, a selo in Seredinskoye Rural Settlement of Shakhovskoy District
- Nikolskoye, Solnechnogorsky District, Moscow Oblast, a village in Peshkovskoye Rural Settlement of Solnechnogorsky District
- Nikolskoye, Volokolamsky District, Moscow Oblast, a village in Teryayevskoye Rural Settlement of Volokolamsky District
- Nikolskoye, Voskresensky District, Moscow Oblast, a village in Ashitkovskoye Rural Settlement of Voskresensky District
- Nikolskoye, Zaraysky District, Moscow Oblast, a village in Strupnenskoye Rural Settlement of Zaraysky District

Historic:

- Nikolskoye, Pokrovsky Uyezd, Vladimir Governorate, incorporated into Orekhovo-Zuyevo 3 June, 1917

=== Nizhny Novgorod Oblast ===
As of 2010, ten rural localities in Nizhny Novgorod Oblast bear this name:

- Nikolsky, Nizhny Novgorod Oblast, a settlement in Petrovsky Selsoviet of Pervomaysky District
- Nikolskoye, Kantaurovsky Selsoviet, Bor, Nizhny Novgorod Oblast, a village in Kantaurovsky Selsoviet of the city of oblast significance of Bor
- Nikolskoye, Lindovsky Selsoviet, Bor, Nizhny Novgorod Oblast, a village in Lindovsky Selsoviet of the city of oblast significance of Bor
- Nikolskoye, Arzamassky District, Nizhny Novgorod Oblast, a selo in Balakhonikhinsky Selsoviet of Arzamassky District
- Nikolskoye, Gaginsky District, Nizhny Novgorod Oblast, a selo in Yuryevsky Selsoviet of Gaginsky District
- Nikolskoye, Brilyakovsky Selsoviet, Gorodetsky District, Nizhny Novgorod Oblast, a village in Brilyakovsky Selsoviet of Gorodetsky District
- Nikolskoye, Smolkovsky Selsoviet, Gorodetsky District, Nizhny Novgorod Oblast, a village in Smolkovsky Selsoviet of Gorodetsky District
- Nikolskoye, Lyskovsky District, Nizhny Novgorod Oblast, a selo in Lenkovsky Selsoviet of Lyskovsky District
- Nikolskoye, Sokolsky District, Nizhny Novgorod Oblast, a village in Loyminsky Selsoviet of Sokolsky District
- Nikolskoye, Vorotynsky District, Nizhny Novgorod Oblast, a village in Semyansky Selsoviet of Vorotynsky District

=== Novgorod Oblast ===
As of 2010, four rural localities in Novgorod Oblast bear this name:

- Nikolskoye, Demyansky District, Novgorod Oblast, a selo in Pesotskoye Settlement of Demyansky District
- Nikolskoye, Lyubytinsky District, Novgorod Oblast, a village under the administrative jurisdiction of the urban-type settlement of Lyubytino in Lyubytinsky District
- Nikolskoye, Malovishersky District, Novgorod Oblast, a village in Burginskoye Settlement of Malovishersky District
- Nikolskoye, Soletsky District, Novgorod Oblast, a village in Gorskoye Settlement of Soletsky District

=== Novosibirsk Oblast ===
As of 2010, one rural locality in Novosibirsk Oblast bears this name:

- Nikolsky, Novosibirsk Oblast, a settlement under the administrative jurisdiction of the work settlement of Gorny in Toguchinsky District

=== Omsk Oblast ===
As of 2010, one rural locality in Omsk Oblast bears this name:

- Nikolskoye, Omsk Oblast, a selo in Nikolsky Rural Okrug of Tyukalinsky District

=== Orenburg Oblast ===
As of 2010, five rural localities in Orenburg Oblast bear this name:

- Nikolskoye, Krasnogvardeysky District, Orenburg Oblast, a selo in Nikolsky Selsoviet of Krasnogvardeysky District
- Nikolskoye, Kuvandyksky District, Orenburg Oblast, a selo in Krasnoznamensky Selsoviet of Kuvandyksky District
- Nikolskoye, Orenburgsky District, Orenburg Oblast, a selo in Nikolsky Selsoviet of Orenburgsky District
- Nikolskoye, Sakmarsky District, Orenburg Oblast, a selo in Nikolsky Selsoviet of Sakmarsky District
- Nikolskoye, Sorochinsky District, Orenburg Oblast, a selo in Nikolayevsky Selsoviet of Sorochinsky District

=== Oryol Oblast ===
As of 2010, sixteen rural localities in Oryol Oblast bear this name:

- Nikolsky, Bolkhovsky District, Oryol Oblast, a settlement in Odnolutsky Selsoviet of Bolkhovsky District
- Nikolsky, Dmitrovsky District, Oryol Oblast, a settlement in Domakhovsky Selsoviet of Dmitrovsky District
- Nikolsky, Verkhovsky District, Oryol Oblast, a settlement in Vasilyevsky Selsoviet of Verkhovsky District
- Nikolsky, Zalegoshchensky District, Oryol Oblast, a settlement in Bortnovsky Selsoviet of Zalegoshchensky District
- Nikolskoye, Dolzhansky District, Oryol Oblast, a selo in Kudinovsky Selsoviet of Dolzhansky District
- Nikolskoye, Glazunovsky District, Oryol Oblast, a village in Ochkinsky Selsoviet of Glazunovsky District
- Nikolskoye, Khotynetsky District, Oryol Oblast, a selo in Krasnoryabinsky Selsoviet of Khotynetsky District
- Nikolskoye, Kolpnyansky District, Oryol Oblast, a village in Belokolodezsky Selsoviet of Kolpnyansky District
- Nikolskoye, Livensky District, Oryol Oblast, a selo in Nikolsky Selsoviet of Livensky District
- Nikolskoye, Maloarkhangelsky District, Oryol Oblast, a selo in Leninsky Selsoviet of Maloarkhangelsky District
- Nikolskoye, Mtsensky District, Oryol Oblast, a village in Alyabyevsky Selsoviet of Mtsensky District
- Nikolskoye, Novoderevenkovsky District, Oryol Oblast, a village in Novoderevenkovsky Selsoviet of Novoderevenkovsky District
- Nikolskoye, Pokrovsky District, Oryol Oblast, a village in Topkovsky Selsoviet of Pokrovsky District
- Nikolskoye, Sverdlovsky District, Oryol Oblast, a selo in Nikolsky Selsoviet of Sverdlovsky District
- Nikolskoye, Trosnyansky District, Oryol Oblast, a selo in Nikolsky Selsoviet of Trosnyansky District
- Nikolskoye, Verkhovsky District, Oryol Oblast, a village in Korsunsky Selsoviet of Verkhovsky District

=== Penza Oblast ===
As of 2010, six rural localities in Penza Oblast bear this name:

- Nikolskoye, Bekovsky District, Penza Oblast, a selo in Ivanovsky Selsoviet of Bekovsky District
- Nikolskoye, Bessonovsky District, Penza Oblast, a village in Sosnovsky Selsoviet of Bessonovsky District
- Nikolskoye, Kuznetsky District, Penza Oblast, a selo in Nikolsky Selsoviet of Kuznetsky District
- Nikolskoye, Lopatinsky District, Penza Oblast, a selo in Vereshimsky Selsoviet of Lopatinsky District
- Nikolskoye, Tamalinsky District, Penza Oblast, a selo in Vishnevsky Selsoviet of Tamalinsky District
- Nikolskoye, Zemetchinsky District, Penza Oblast, a village in Morsovsky Selsoviet of Zemetchinsky District

=== Perm Krai ===
As of 2010, two rural localities in Perm Krai bear this name:

- Nikolskoye, Perm Krai, a selo in Karagaysky District
- Nikolskaya, Perm Krai, a village in Sivinsky District

=== Pskov Oblast ===
As of 2010, two rural localities in Pskov Oblast bear this name:

- Nikolskoye, Bezhanitsky District, Pskov Oblast, a village in Bezhanitsky District
- Nikolskoye, Kunyinsky District, Pskov Oblast, a village in Kunyinsky District

=== Rostov Oblast ===
As of 2010, three rural localities in Rostov Oblast bear this name:

- Nikolsky, Rostov Oblast, a khutor in Nikolskoye Rural Settlement of Zavetinsky District
- Nikolskoye, Rostov Oblast, a selo in Novobessergenevskoye Rural Settlement of Neklinovsky District
- Nikolskaya, Rostov Oblast, a sloboda in Olkhovo-Rogskoye Rural Settlement of Millerovsky District

=== Ryazan Oblast ===
As of 2010, four rural localities in Ryazan Oblast bear this name:

- Nikolsky, Ryazan Oblast, a settlement in Karl-Marksovsky Rural Okrug of Sarayevsky District
- Nikolskoye, Alexandro-Nevsky District, Ryazan Oblast, a selo in Nizhneyakimetsky Rural Okrug of Alexandro-Nevsky District
- Nikolskoye, Ryazansky District, Ryazan Oblast, a selo in Semenovsky Rural Okrug of Ryazansky District
- Nikolskoye, Sapozhkovsky District, Ryazan Oblast, a selo in Nikolsky Rural Okrug of Sapozhkovsky District

=== Sakha Republic ===
As of 2010, one rural locality in the Sakha Republic bears this name:

- Nikolsky, Sakha Republic, a selo in Nikolsky Rural Okrug of Namsky District

=== Sakhalin Oblast ===
As of 2010, one rural locality in Sakhalin Oblast bears this name:

- Nikolskoye, Sakhalin Oblast, a selo in Uglegorsky District

=== Samara Oblast ===
As of 2010, three rural localities in Samara Oblast bear this name:

- Nikolsky, Bogatovsky District, Samara Oblast, a settlement in Bogatovsky District
- Nikolsky, Isaklinsky District, Samara Oblast, a settlement in Isaklinsky District
- Nikolskoye, Samara Oblast, a selo in Bezenchuksky District

=== Saratov Oblast ===
As of 2010, five rural localities in Saratov Oblast bear this name:

- Nikolsky, Saratov Oblast, a railway crossing loop in Tatishchevsky District
- Nikolskoye, Bazarno-Karabulaksky District, Saratov Oblast, a selo in Bazarno-Karabulaksky District
- Nikolskoye, Dukhovnitsky District, Saratov Oblast, a selo in Dukhovnitsky District
- Nikolskoye, Fyodorovsky District, Saratov Oblast, a selo in Fyodorovsky District
- Nikolskoye, Volsky District, Saratov Oblast, a selo in Volsky District

=== Smolensk Oblast ===
As of 2010, seven rural localities in Smolensk Oblast bear this name:

- Nikolskoye, Gagarinsky District, Smolensk Oblast, a village in Nikolskoye Rural Settlement of Gagarinsky District
- Nikolskoye, Novoduginsky District, Smolensk Oblast, a village in Vysokovskoye Rural Settlement of Novoduginsky District
- Nikolskoye, Roslavlsky District, Smolensk Oblast, a village in Lesnikovskoye Rural Settlement of Roslavlsky District
- Nikolskoye, Smolensky District, Smolensk Oblast, a village in Korokhotkinskoye Rural Settlement of Smolensky District
- Nikolskoye, Sychyovsky District, Smolensk Oblast, a village in Nikolskoye Rural Settlement of Sychyovsky District
- Nikolskoye, Polyanovskoye Rural Settlement, Vyazemsky District, Smolensk Oblast, a village in Polyanovskoye Rural Settlement of Vyazemsky District
- Nikolskoye, Zavodskoye Rural Settlement, Vyazemsky District, Smolensk Oblast, a village in Zavodskoye Rural Settlement of Vyazemsky District

=== Stavropol Krai ===
As of 2010, one rural locality in Stavropol Krai bears this name:

- Nikolskoye, Stavropol Krai, a selo in Varenikovsky Selsoviet of Stepnovsky District

=== Sverdlovsk Oblast ===
As of 2010, three rural localities in Sverdlovsk Oblast bear this name:

- Nikolsky, Sverdlovsk Oblast, a settlement under the administrative jurisdiction of the Town of Krasnouralsk
- Nikolskoye, Kamyshlovsky District, Sverdlovsk Oblast, a selo in Kamyshlovsky District
- Nikolskoye, Sysertsky District, Sverdlovsk Oblast, a selo in Sysertsky District

=== Tambov Oblast ===
As of 2015, eleven rural localities in Tambov Oblast bear this name:

- Nikolsky, Tambov Oblast, a settlement in Pervomaysky Selsoviet of Sampursky District
- Nikolskoye, Gavrilovsky District, Tambov Oblast, a village in Osino-Gaysky Selsoviet of Gavrilovsky District
- Nikolskoye, Michurinsky District, Tambov Oblast, a selo in Glazkovsky Selsoviet of Michurinsky District
- Nikolskoye, Mordovsky District, Tambov Oblast, a village in Shulginsky Selsoviet of Mordovsky District
- Nikolskoye, Nikiforovsky District, Tambov Oblast, a selo in Yurlovsky Selsoviet of Nikiforovsky District
- Nikolskoye, Pervomaysky District, Tambov Oblast, a selo in Novoseslavinsky Selsoviet of Pervomaysky District
- Nikolskoye, Novositovsky Selsoviet, Petrovsky District, Tambov Oblast, a settlement in Novositovsky Selsoviet of Petrovsky District
- Nikolskoye, Rakhmaninsky Selsoviet, Petrovsky District, Tambov Oblast, a village in Rakhmaninsky Selsoviet of Petrovsky District
- Nikolskoye, Rasskazovsky District, Tambov Oblast, a selo in Nikolsky Selsoviet of Rasskazovsky District
- Nikolskoye, Znamensky District, Tambov Oblast, a selo in Nikolsky Selsoviet of Znamensky District
- Nikolskaya, Tambov Oblast, a village in Leninsky Selsoviet of Mordovsky District

=== Republic of Tatarstan ===
As of 2010, four rural localities in the Republic of Tatarstan bear this name:

- Nikolsky, Republic of Tatarstan, a settlement in Verkhneuslonsky District
- Nikolskoye, Laishevsky District, Republic of Tatarstan, a selo in Laishevsky District
- Nikolskoye, Spassky District, Republic of Tatarstan, a selo in Spassky District
- Nikolskoye, Zelenodolsky District, Republic of Tatarstan, a village in Zelenodolsky District

=== Tomsk Oblast ===
As of 2010, one rural locality in Tomsk Oblast bears this name:

- Nikolskoye, Tomsk Oblast, a selo in Krivosheinsky District

=== Tula Oblast ===
As of 2010, thirteen rural localities in Tula Oblast bear this name:

- Nikolsky, Tula Oblast, a settlement in Bolsheplotavsky Rural Okrug of Yefremovsky District
- Nikolskoye, Dyakovskaya Rural Administration, Chernsky District, Tula Oblast, a village in Dyakovskaya Rural Administration of Chernsky District
- Nikolskoye, Nikolskaya Rural Administration, Chernsky District, Tula Oblast, a village in Nikolskaya Rural Administration of Chernsky District
- Nikolskoye, Kireyevsky District, Tula Oblast, a village in Bolshekalmyksky Rural Okrug of Kireyevsky District
- Nikolskoye, Kurkinsky District, Tula Oblast, a selo in Sergiyevskaya Volost of Kurkinsky District
- Nikolskoye, Odoyevsky District, Tula Oblast, a village in Stoyanovskaya Rural Administration of Odoyevsky District
- Nikolskoye, Plavsky District, Tula Oblast, a village in Meshcherinsky Rural Okrug of Plavsky District
- Nikolskoye, Shchyokinsky District, Tula Oblast, a selo in Nikolskaya Rural Administration of Shchyokinsky District
- Nikolskoye, Uzlovsky District, Tula Oblast, a village in Nikolskaya Rural Administration of Uzlovsky District
- Nikolskoye, Yasnogorsky District, Tula Oblast, a village in Taydakovskaya Rural Territory of Yasnogorsky District
- Nikolskoye, Oktyabrsky Rural Okrug, Yefremovsky District, Tula Oblast, a village in Oktyabrsky Rural Okrug of Yefremovsky District
- Nikolskoye, Shkilevsky Rural Okrug, Yefremovsky District, Tula Oblast, a selo in Shkilevsky Rural Okrug of Yefremovsky District
- Nikolskoye, Zaoksky District, Tula Oblast, a village under the administrative jurisdiction of the urban-type settlement of Zaoksky in Zaoksky District

=== Tver Oblast ===
As of 2010, twenty-one rural localities in Tver Oblast bear this name:

- Nikolskoye, Kalininsky District, Tver Oblast, a selo in Kalininsky District
- Nikolskoye (selo), Kashinsky District, Tver Oblast, a selo in Kashinsky District
- Nikolskoye (village), Kashinsky District, Tver Oblast, a village in Kashinsky District
- Nikolskoye (Nikolskoye Rural Settlement), Kesovogorsky District, Tver Oblast, a village in Kesovogorsky District; municipally, a part of Nikolskoye Rural Settlement of that district
- Nikolskoye (Strelikhinskoye Rural Settlement), Kesovogorsky District, Tver Oblast, a village in Kesovogorsky District; municipally, a part of Strelikhinskoye Rural Settlement of that district
- Nikolskoye (Pervomayskoye Rural Settlement), Konakovsky District, Tver Oblast, a village in Konakovsky District; municipally, a part of Pervomayskoye Rural Settlement of that district
- Nikolskoye (Dmitrovogorskoye Rural Settlement), Konakovsky District, Tver Oblast, a village in Konakovsky District; municipally, a part of Dmitrovogorskoye Rural Settlement of that district
- Nikolskoye, Lesnoy District, Tver Oblast, a selo in Lesnoy District
- Nikolskoye (Seletskoye Rural Settlement), Maksatikhinsky District, Tver Oblast, a village in Maksatikhinsky District; municipally, a part of Seletskoye Rural Settlement of that district
- Nikolskoye (Zarechenskoye Rural Settlement), Maksatikhinsky District, Tver Oblast, a village in Maksatikhinsky District; municipally, a part of Zarechenskoye Rural Settlement of that district
- Nikolskoye, Molokovsky District, Tver Oblast, a village in Molokovsky District
- Nikolskoye, Ostashkovsky District, Tver Oblast, a village in Ostashkovsky District
- Nikolskoye, Rameshkovsky District, Tver Oblast, a selo in Rameshkovsky District
- Nikolskoye, Sandovsky District, Tver Oblast, a village in Sandovsky District
- Nikolskoye (Lukovnikovskoye Rural Settlement), Staritsky District, Tver Oblast, a village in Staritsky District; municipally, a part of Lukovnikovskoye Rural Settlement of that district
- Nikolskoye (Novo-Yamskoye Rural Settlement), Staritsky District, Tver Oblast, a village in Staritsky District; municipally, a part of Novo-Yamskoye Rural Settlement of that district
- Nikolskoye (Stepurinskoye Rural Settlement), Staritsky District, Tver Oblast, a village in Staritsky District; municipally, a part of Stepurinskoye Rural Settlement of that district
- Nikolskoye (Stepurinskoye Rural Settlement), Staritsky District, Tver Oblast, a village in Staritsky District; municipally, a part of Stepurinskoye Rural Settlement of that district
- Nikolskoye, Toropetsky District, Tver Oblast, a village in Toropetsky District
- Nikolskoye, Torzhoksky District, Tver Oblast, a selo in Torzhoksky District
- Nikolskoye, Zubtsovsky District, Tver Oblast, a village in Zubtsovsky District

=== Tyumen Oblast ===
As of 2010, two rural localities in Tyumen Oblast bear this name:

- Nikolsky, Tyumen Oblast, a settlement in Karasulsky Rural Okrug of Ishimsky District
- Nikolskaya, Tyumen Oblast, a village in Novoaleksandrovsky Rural Okrug of Yarkovsky District

=== Udmurt Republic ===
As of 2010, three rural localities in the Udmurt Republic bear this name:

- Nikolsky, Udmurt Republic, a pochinok in Bolgurinsky Selsoviet of Votkinsky District
- Nikolskoye, Yarsky District, Udmurt Republic, a selo in Nikolsky Selsoviet of Yarsky District
- Nikolskoye, Zavyalovsky District, Udmurt Republic, a village in Babinsky Selsoviet of Zavyalovsky District

=== Ulyanovsk Oblast ===
As of 2010, two rural localities in Ulyanovsk Oblast bear this name:

- Nikolskoye, Kuzovatovsky District, Ulyanovsk Oblast, a selo in Yedelevsky Rural Okrug of Kuzovatovsky District
- Nikolskoye, Sengileyevsky District, Ulyanovsk Oblast, a selo in Yelaursky Rural Okrug of Sengileyevsky District

=== Vladimir Oblast ===
As of 2010, two rural localities in Vladimir Oblast bear this name:

- Nikolskoye, Alexandrovsky District, Vladimir Oblast, a village in Alexandrovsky District
- Nikolskoye, Sudogodsky District, Vladimir Oblast, a village in Sudogodsky District

=== Vologda Oblast ===
As of 2010, nineteen rural localities in Vologda Oblast bear this name:

- Nikolskoye, Babayevsky District, Vologda Oblast, a village in Volkovsky Selsoviet of Babayevsky District
- Nikolskoye, Cherepovetsky District, Vologda Oblast, a selo in Abakanovsky Selsoviet of Cherepovetsky District
- Nikolskoye, Ploskovsky Selsoviet, Gryazovetsky District, Vologda Oblast, a village in Ploskovsky Selsoviet of Gryazovetsky District
- Nikolskoye, Vokhtogsky Selsoviet, Gryazovetsky District, Vologda Oblast, a village in Vokhtogsky Selsoviet of Gryazovetsky District
- Nikolskoye, Kaduysky District, Vologda Oblast, a selo in Nikolsky Selsoviet of Kaduysky District
- Nikolskoye, Kirillovsky District, Vologda Oblast, a selo in Ivanovoborsky Selsoviet of Kirillovsky District
- Nikolskoye, Mezhdurechensky District, Vologda Oblast, a village in Sheybukhtovsky Selsoviet of Mezhdurechensky District
- Nikolskoye, Argunovsky Selsoviet, Nikolsky District, Vologda Oblast, a village in Argunovsky Selsoviet of Nikolsky District
- Nikolskoye, Nizhnekemsky Selsoviet, Nikolsky District, Vologda Oblast, a selo in Nizhnekemsky Selsoviet of Nikolsky District
- Nikolskoye, Sheksninsky District, Vologda Oblast, a village in Yershovsky Selsoviet of Sheksninsky District
- Nikolskoye, Sokolsky District, Vologda Oblast, a village in Chuchkovsky Selsoviet of Sokolsky District
- Nikolskoye, Syamzhensky District, Vologda Oblast, a village in Zhityevsky Selsoviet of Syamzhensky District
- Nikolskoye, Totemsky District, Vologda Oblast, a selo in Nikolsky Selsoviet of Totemsky District
- Nikolskoye, Ust-Kubinsky District, Vologda Oblast, a selo in Nikolsky Selsoviet of Ust-Kubinsky District
- Nikolskoye, Vashkinsky District, Vologda Oblast, a village in Pokrovsky Selsoviet of Vashkinsky District
- Nikolskaya, Sokolsky District, Vologda Oblast, a village in Biryakovsky Selsoviet of Sokolsky District
- Nikolskaya, Vashkinsky District, Vologda Oblast, a village in Roksomsky Selsoviet of Vashkinsky District
- Nikolskaya, Verkhovazhsky District, Vologda Oblast, a village in Olyushinsky Selsoviet of Verkhovazhsky District
- Nikolskaya, Vozhegodsky District, Vologda Oblast, a village in Lipino-Kalikinsky Selsoviet of Vozhegodsky District

=== Voronezh Oblast ===
As of 2010, ten rural localities in Voronezh Oblast bear this name:

- Nikolsky, Ertilsky District, Voronezh Oblast, a settlement under the administrative jurisdiction of Ertilskoye Urban Settlement of Ertilsky District
- Nikolsky, Liskinsky District, Voronezh Oblast, a khutor in Zaluzhenskoye Rural Settlement of Liskinsky District
- Nikolsky, Podgorensky District, Voronezh Oblast, a khutor in Skororybskoye Rural Settlement of Podgorensky District
- Nikolskoye, Voronezh, Voronezh Oblast, a selo under the administrative jurisdiction of Voronezh Urban Okrug
- Nikolskoye, Anninsky District, Voronezh Oblast, a selo in Nikolskoye Rural Settlement of Anninsky District
- Nikolskoye, Novousmansky District, Voronezh Oblast, a settlement in Rozhdestvensko-Khavskoye Rural Settlement of Novousmansky District
- Nikolskoye, Paninsky District, Voronezh Oblast, a selo in Progressovskoye Rural Settlement of Paninsky District
- Nikolskoye, Semiluksky District, Voronezh Oblast, a selo in Nizhnevedugskoye Rural Settlement of Semiluksky District
- Nikolskoye, Talovsky District, Voronezh Oblast, a selo in Nikolskoye Rural Settlement of Talovsky District
- Nikolskoye, Verkhnekhavsky District, Voronezh Oblast, a settlement in Maloprivalovskoye Rural Settlement of Verkhnekhavsky District

=== Yaroslavl Oblast ===
As of 2010, sixteen rural localities in Yaroslavl Oblast bear this name:

- Nikolskoye, Bolsheselsky District, Yaroslavl Oblast, a selo in Bolsheselsky Rural Okrug of Bolsheselsky District
- Nikolskoye, Breytovsky District, Yaroslavl Oblast, a village in Filimonovsky Rural Okrug of Breytovsky District
- Nikolskoye, Danilovsky District, Yaroslavl Oblast, a selo in Nikolsky Rural Okrug of Danilovsky District
- Nikolskoye, Lyubimsky District, Yaroslavl Oblast, a selo in Osetsky Rural Okrug of Lyubimsky District
- Nikolskoye, Latskovsky Rural Okrug, Nekouzsky District, Yaroslavl Oblast, a village in Latskovsky Rural Okrug of Nekouzsky District
- Nikolskoye, Shestikhinsky Rural Okrug, Nekouzsky District, Yaroslavl Oblast, a village in Shestikhinsky Rural Okrug of Nekouzsky District
- Nikolskoye, Nekrasovsky District, Yaroslavl Oblast, a selo in Nikolsky Rural Okrug of Nekrasovsky District
- Nikolskoye, Pereslavsky District, Yaroslavl Oblast, a village in Dubrovitsky Rural Okrug of Pereslavsky District
- Nikolskoye, Leninsky Rural Okrug, Poshekhonsky District, Yaroslavl Oblast, a village in Leninsky Rural Okrug of Poshekhonsky District
- Nikolskoye, Yermakovsky Rural Okrug, Poshekhonsky District, Yaroslavl Oblast, a village in Yermakovsky Rural Okrug of Poshekhonsky District
- Nikolskoye, Rostovsky District, Yaroslavl Oblast, a selo in Nikolsky Rural Okrug of Rostovsky District
- Nikolskoye, Nikolo-Kormsky Rural Okrug, Rybinsky District, Yaroslavl Oblast, a selo in Nikolo-Kormsky Rural Okrug of Rybinsky District
- Nikolskoye, Volzhsky Rural Okrug, Rybinsky District, Yaroslavl Oblast, a village in Volzhsky Rural Okrug of Rybinsky District
- Nikolskoye, Fominsky Rural Okrug, Tutayevsky District, Yaroslavl Oblast, a village in Fominsky Rural Okrug of Tutayevsky District
- Nikolskoye, Nikolsky Rural Okrug, Tutayevsky District, Yaroslavl Oblast, a selo in Nikolsky Rural Okrug of Tutayevsky District
- Nikolskoye, Uglichsky District, Yaroslavl Oblast, a selo in Nikolsky Rural Okrug of Uglichsky District

== Abolished localities ==
- Nikolskoye, Rzhaksinsky District, Tambov Oblast, a former rural locality (a village) in Zolotovsky Selsoviet of Rzhaksinsky District in Tambov Oblast; merged into the selo of Zolotovka in November 2014

== See also ==
- Nikolsk
