= Nikolsk =

Nikolsk (Russian: Нико́льск) is the name of several inhabited localities in Russia.

== Modern localities ==
=== Urban localities ===
- Nikolsk, Nikolsky District, Penza Oblast, a town in Nikolsky District of Penza Oblast
- Nikolsk, Vologda Oblast, a town in Nikolsky District of Vologda Oblast

=== Rural localities ===
- Nikolsk, Altai Krai, a selo in Nikolsky Selsoviet of Zmeinogorsky District in Altai Krai; 51°21′N 81°54′E
- Nikolsk, Arkhangelsk Oblast, a selo in Nikolsky Selsoviet of Vilegodsky District in Arkhangelsk Oblast
- Nikolsk, Aurgazinsky District, Republic of Bashkortostan, a village in Tolbazinsky Selsoviet of Aurgazinsky District in the Republic of Bashkortostan
- Nikolsk, Tatyshlinsky District, Republic of Bashkortostan, a village in Verkhnetatyshlinsky Selsoviet of Tatyshlinsky District in the Republic of Bashkortostan
- Nikolsk, Yanaulsky District, Republic of Bashkortostan, a village in Orlovsky Selsoviet of Yanaulsky District in the Republic of Bashkortostan
- Nikolsk, Bryansk Oblast, a settlement in Lotakovsky Rural Administrative Okrug of Krasnogorsky District in Bryansk Oblast; 53°9′N 31°32′E
- Nikolsk, Kabansky District, Republic of Buryatia, a selo in Sherginsky Selsoviet of Kabansky District in the Republic of Buryatia
- Nikolsk, Mukhorshibirsky District, Republic of Buryatia, a selo in Nikolsky Selsoviet of Mukhorshibirsky District in the Republic of Buryatia
- Nikolsk, Tunkinsky District, Republic of Buryatia, a selo in Tunkinsky Selsoviet of Tunkinsky District in the Republic of Buryatia
- Nikolsk, Irkutsky District, Irkutsk Oblast, a selo in Irkutsky District of Irkutsk Oblast
- Nikolsk, Kirensky District, Irkutsk Oblast, a village in Kirensky District of Irkutsk Oblast
- Nikolsk, Abansky District, Krasnoyarsk Krai, a selo in Nikolsky Selsoviet of Abansky District in Krasnoyarsk Krai
- Nikolsk, Motyginsky District, Krasnoyarsk Krai, a settlement in Mashukovsky Selsoviet of Motyginsky District in Krasnoyarsk Krai
- Nikolsk, Pirovsky District, Krasnoyarsk Krai, a village in Bushuysky Selsoviet of Pirovsky District in Krasnoyarsk Krai
- Nikolsk, Sharypovsky District, Krasnoyarsk Krai, a selo in Rodnikovsky Selsoviet of Sharypovsky District in Krasnoyarsk Krai
- Nikolsk, Tyukhtetsky District, Krasnoyarsk Krai, a village in Novomitropolsky Selsoviet of Tyukhtetsky District in Krasnoyarsk Krai
- Nikolsk, Krutinsky District, Omsk Oblast, a village in Tolokontsevsky Rural Okrug of Krutinsky District in Omsk Oblast
- Nikolsk, Ust-Ishimsky District, Omsk Oblast, a selo in Nikolsky Rural Okrug of Ust-Ishimsky District in Omsk Oblast
- Nikolsk, Znamensky District, Omsk Oblast, a village in Cheredovsky Rural Okrug of Znamensky District in Omsk Oblast
- Nikolsk, Kolyshleysky District, Penza Oblast, a selo in Pleshcheyevsky Selsoviet of Kolyshleysky District in Penza Oblast
- Nikolsk, Perm Krai, a village in Bardymsky District of Perm Krai
- Nikolsk, Smolensk Oblast, a village in Gagarinskoye Rural Settlement of Gagarinsky District in Smolensk Oblast
- Nikolsk, Tyumen Oblast, a village in Yevsinsky Rural Okrug of Golyshmanovsky District in Tyumen Oblast

== Alternative names ==
- Nikolsk, alternative name of Nikolskoye, a selo in Nikolsky Selsoviet of Sovetsky District in Altai Krai; 52°13′N 85°16′E

== Historical names ==
- Nikolsk, name of the city of Ussuriysk in Primorsky Krai, Russia in 1917–1926

== See also ==
- Nikolsky (inhabited locality), several inhabited localities in Russia
