= Nikolsky =

Nikolsky (masculine), Nikolskaya (feminine), or Nikolskoye (neuter) may refer to:

== Places ==
- Nikolski, Alaska, a census-designated place in Alaska
- Nikolske, Ukraine, an urban locality in Ukraine
- Nikolsky District, several districts in Russia
- Nikolsky (inhabited locality) (Nikolskaya, Nikolskoye), several inhabited localities in Russia
- Nikolsky, former name of Satbayev (city), Kazakhstan
- Nikolskoye Urban Settlement, several municipal urban settlements in Russia
- Nikolskoe Cemetery, burial ground in Saint Petersburg

== Other ==
- Nikolsky (surname), including a list of people with the name
- Nikolski Air Station, an airport located in Nikolski, Alaska
- Nikolskoye Airport, an airport in Kamchatka Krai, Russia
- Nikolski (novel), a novel by Canadian writer Nicolas Dickner
- Nikolsky Old Believer Monastery, a monastery near Preobrazhenskoye Cemetery in Moscow, Russia
- Nikolsky, nom de guerre of Vladimir Neumann

== See also ==
- Nikolsk, several inhabited localities in Russia
- Nikolsk Urban Settlement, several municipal urban settlements in Russia
- Nikolsky's sign, a clinical dermatological sign
- Nikolsky's adder, common name of Vipera nikolskii, a venomous viper species endemic in Ukraine
