= Nikolsk Urban Settlement =

Nikolsk Urban Settlement is the name of several municipal formations in Russia.

- Nikolsk Urban Settlement, a municipal formation which the town of district significance of Nikolsk in Nikolsky District of Penza Oblast is incorporated as
- Nikolsk Urban Settlement, a municipal formation which the town of district significance of Nikolsk in Nikolsky District of Vologda Oblast is incorporated as

== See also ==
- Nikolsk
- Nikolsky (disambiguation)
- Nikolay (disambiguation)
