= Narsata =

Narsata Нарсата
- Ulus
- Location within Republic of Buryatia Location within Russia
- Coordinates: 51°15′N 107°54′E
- Country: Russia
- Region: Republic of Buryatia
- District: Mukhorshibirsky District
- Time zone: UTC+8:00

Narsata (Russian: Нарсата; Buryat: Нарһата, Narhata) is a rural locality (an ulus) in Mukhorshibirsky District, Republic of Buryatia, Russia. The population was 349 as of 2010. There are 7 streets.

== Geography ==
Narsata is located 58 km north of Mukhorshibir (the district's administrative centre) by road. Galtay is the nearest rural locality.
