= Tugnuy =

Tugnuy Тугнуй
- Selo
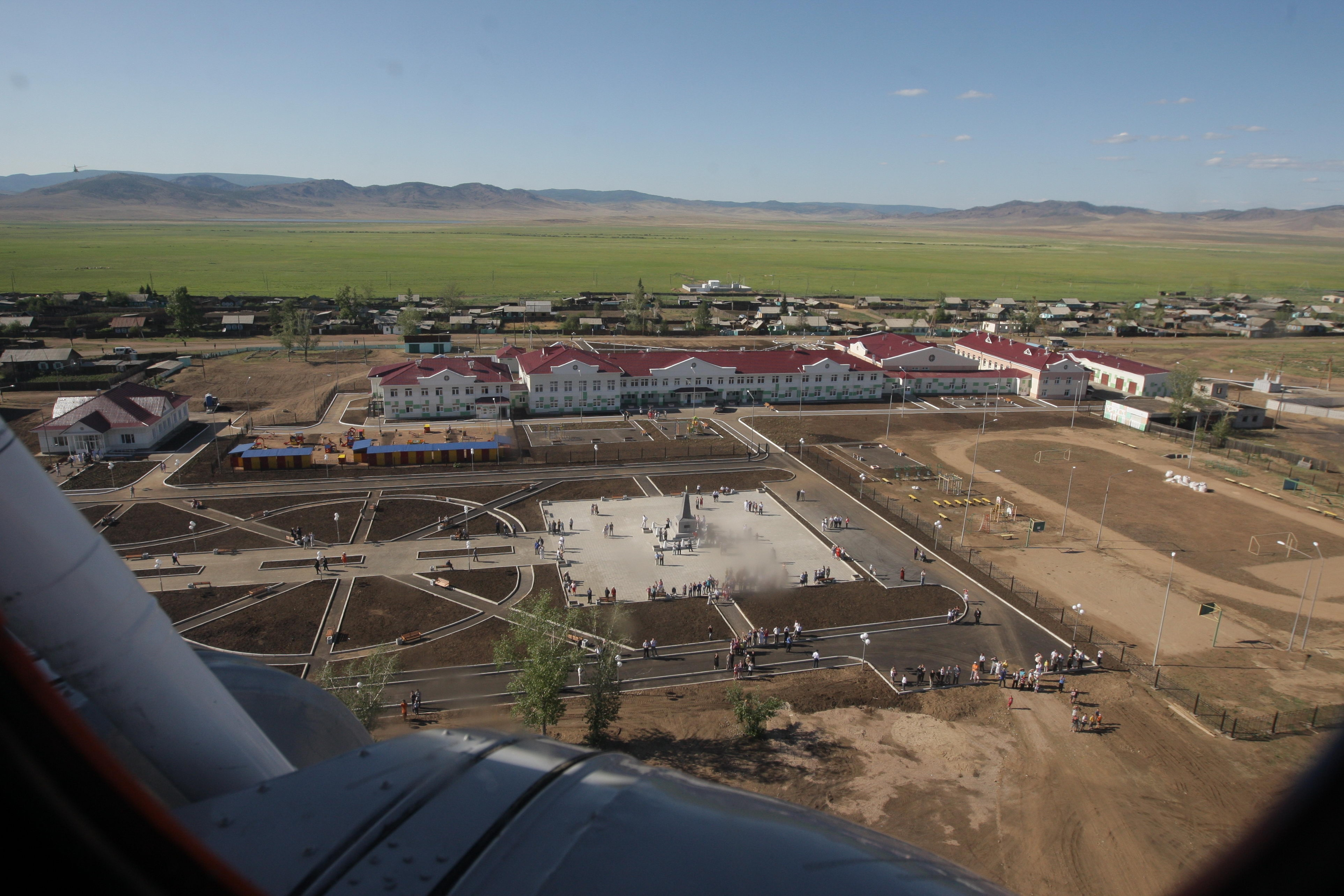

- Location within Republic of Buryatia Location within Russia
- Coordinates: 51°12′N 108°06′E
- Country: Russia
- Region: Republic of Buryatia
- District: Mukhorshibirsky District
- Time zone: UTC+8:00

Tugnuy (Russian: Тугнуй; Buryat: Тγгнэ, Tügne) is a rural locality (a selo) in Mukhorshibirsky District, Republic of Buryatia, Russia. The population was 740 as of 2010. There are 12 streets.

== Geography ==
Tugnuy is located 40 km northeast of Mukhorshibir (the district's administrative centre) by road. Bom is the nearest rural locality.
