= Kalinovka, Republic of Buryatia =

Kalinovka Калиновка
- Selo
- Location within Republic of Buryatia Location within Russia
- Coordinates: 51°16′N 107°46′E
- Country: Russia
- Region: Republic of Buryatia
- District: Mukhorshibirsky District
- Time zone: UTC+8:00

Kalinovka (Russian: Калиновка) is a rural locality (a selo) in Mukhorshibirsky District, Republic of Buryatia, Russia. The population was 410 as of 2010. There are 3 streets.

== Geography ==
Kalinovka is located 55 km north of Mukhorshibir (the district's administrative centre) by road. Galtay is the nearest rural locality.
