= Galtay =

Galtay Галтай
- Selo
- Location within Republic of Buryatia Location within Russia
- Coordinates: 51°13′N 107°47′E
- Country: Russia
- Region: Republic of Buryatia
- District: Mukhorshibirsky District
- Time zone: UTC+8:00

Galtay (Russian: Галтай) is a rural locality (a selo) in Mukhorshibirsky District, Republic of Buryatia, Russia. The population was 446 as of 2010. There are 9 streets.

== Geography ==
Galtay is located 48 km north of Mukhorshibir (the district's administrative centre) by road. Kalinovka is the nearest rural locality.
