= Kugoty =

Kugoty Куготы
- Selo
- Location within Republic of Buryatia Location within Russia
- Coordinates: 51°02′N 107°30′E
- Country: Russia
- Region: Republic of Buryatia
- District: Mukhorshibirsky District
- Time zone: UTC+8:00

Kugoty (Russian: Куготы; Buryat: Хүһөөтэ, Khühööte) is a rural locality (a selo) in Mukhorshibirsky District, Republic of Buryatia, Russia. The population was 356 as of 2010. There are 5 streets.

== Geography ==
Kugoty is located 26 km west of Mukhorshibir (the district's administrative centre) by road. Zandin is the nearest rural locality.
