= Tsolga =

Tsolga Цолга
- Ulus
- Location within Republic of Buryatia Location within Russia
- Coordinates: 51°04′N 107°14′E
- Country: Russia
- Region: Republic of Buryatia
- District: Mukhorshibirsky District
- Time zone: UTC+8:00

Tsolga (Russian: Цолга; Buryat: Суулга, Suulga) is a rural locality (an ulus) in Mukhorshibirsky District, Republic of Buryatia, Russia. The population was 737 as of 2010. There are 19 streets.

== Geography ==
Tsolga is located 46 km west of Mukhorshibir (the district's administrative centre) by road. Balta is the nearest rural locality.
