= Stary Zagan, Republic of Buryatia =

Stary Zagan Старый Заган
- Selo
- Location within Republic of Buryatia Location within Russia
- Coordinates: 51°01′N 107°47′E
- Country: Russia
- Region: Republic of Buryatia
- District: Mukhorshibirsky District
- Time zone: UTC+8:00

Stary Zagan (Russian: Старый Заган) is a rural locality (a selo) in Mukhorshibirsky District, Republic of Buryatia, Russia. The population was 312 as of 2010. There are 9 streets.

== Geography ==
Stary Zagan is located 5 km southwest of Mukhorshibir (the district's administrative centre) by road. Novy Zagan is the nearest rural locality.
