= Kharashibir =

Kharashibir Харашибирь
- Selo
- Location within Republic of Buryatia Location within Russia
- Coordinates: 51°05′N 107°59′E
- Country: Russia
- Region: Republic of Buryatia
- District: Mukhorshibirsky District
- Time zone: UTC+8:00

Kharashibir (Russian: Харашибирь; Buryat: Хара Шэбэр, Khara Sheber) is a rural locality (a selo) in Mukhorshibirsky District, Republic of Buryatia, Russia. The population was 898 as of 2010. There are 6 streets.

== Geography ==
Kharashibir is located 14 km northeast of Mukhorshibir (the district's administrative centre) by road. Mukhorshibir is the nearest rural locality.
