= Kusoty =

Kusoty Кусоты
- Ulus
- Location within Republic of Buryatia Location within Russia
- Coordinates: 51°20′N 108°21′E
- Country: Russia
- Region: Republic of Buryatia
- District: Mukhorshibirsky District
- Time zone: UTC+8:00

Kusoty (Russian: Кусоты; Buryat: Хүсөөтэ, Khüsööte) is a rural locality (an ulus) in Mukhorshibirsky District, Republic of Buryatia, Russia. The population was 703 as of 2010. There are 15 streets.

== Geography ==
Kusoty is located 80 km northeast of Mukhorshibir (the district's administrative centre) by road. Sagan-Nur is the nearest rural locality.
