= Ust-Altasha =

Ust-Altasha Усть-Алташа
- Ulus
- Location within Republic of Buryatia Location within Russia
- Coordinates: 51°02′N 107°04′E
- Country: Russia
- Region: Republic of Buryatia
- District: Mukhorshibirsky District
- Time zone: UTC+8:00

Ust-Altasha (Russian: Усть-Алташа; Buryat: Алташын Адаг, Altashyn Adag) is a rural locality (an ulus) in Mukhorshibirsky District, Republic of Buryatia, Russia. The population was 200 as of 2010. There are 5 streets.

== Geography ==
Ust-Altasha is located 65 km west of Mukhorshibir (the district's administrative centre) by road. Zurgan-Debe is the nearest rural locality.
