= Novospassk, Republic of Buryatia =

Novospassk Новоспасск
- Selo
- Location within Republic of Buryatia Location within Russia
- Coordinates: 51°16′N 108°07′E
- Country: Russia
- Region: Republic of Buryatia
- District: Mukhorshibirsky District
- Time zone: UTC+8:00

Novospassk (Russian: Новоспасск) is a rural locality (a selo) in Mukhorshibirsky District, Republic of Buryatia, Russia. The population was 57 as of 2010. There is 1 street.

== Geography ==
Novospassk is located 50 km northeast of Mukhorshibir (the district's administrative centre) by road. Tugnuy is the nearest rural locality.
