= Khoshun-Uzur =

Khoshun-Uzur Хошун-Узур
- Ulus
- Location within Republic of Buryatia Location within Russia
- Coordinates: 51°14′N 107°35′E
- Country: Russia
- Region: Republic of Buryatia
- District: Mukhorshibirsky District
- Time zone: UTC+8:00

Khoshun-Uzur (Russian: Хошун-Узур; Buryat: Хошуун Yзүүр, Khoshuun Üzüür) is a rural locality (an ulus) in Mukhorshibirsky District, Republic of Buryatia, Russia. The population was 500 as of 2010. There are 8 streets.

== Geography ==
Khoshun-Uzur is located 32 km northwest of Mukhorshibir (the district's administrative centre) by road. Kharyastka is the nearest rural locality.
