= Nikolsk, Mukhorshibirsky District, Republic of Buryatia =

Nikolsk Никольск
- Selo
- Location within Republic of Buryatia Location within Russia
- Coordinates: 51°11′N 108°19′E
- Country: Russia
- Region: Republic of Buryatia
- District: Mukhorshibirsky District
- Time zone: UTC+8:00

Nikolsk (Russian: Никольск) is a rural locality (a selo) in Mukhorshibirsky District, Republic of Buryatia, Russia. The population was 1,309 as of 2010. There are 20 streets.

== Geography ==
Nikolsk is located 45 km northeast of Mukhorshibir (the district's administrative centre) by road. Khonkholoy is the nearest rural locality.
