= Nikolsky (surname) =

Nikolsky (Russian: Никольский) is a surname. Notable people with the name include:

== People ==
- Alexander A. Nikolsky (1903–1963), American helicopter theoretical pioneer
- Alexander Nikolsky (1858–1942), Soviet zoologist
- Alexandru Nicolschi (1915–1992), Romanian and Soviet communist politician
- Andrei Nikolsky (1959–1995), Russian pianist
- Andronik (Nikolsky) (1870–1918), bishop of the Russian Orthodox Church and a saint
- Boris Nikolsky (1900–1990), Soviet physical chemist and radiochemist
- Konstantin Nikolsky (born 1951), Russian rock musician
- Mikhail Nikolsky (1891–?), Russian historian and founder of assyriology in Russia
- Nikolay Nikolskiy (1877–1959), Russian ethnographer and historian
- Nikolay Nikolsky (1878–1961), Soviet religious historian, orientalist, and academician
- Nikolay Kapitonovich Nikolski (born 1940), Russian mathematician
- Pyotr Nikolsky (1858–1940), Russian dermatologist
- Sergey Nikolskiy, Soviet sprint canoer who competed in the mid to late 1970s
- Sergey Nikolsky (1905–2012), Russian mathematician
- Vladimir Kapitonovich Nikolsky (1894 – 1953), Soviet historian, ethnologist, translator.
