= Nikolsky District =

Location of Penza Oblast in Russia

Location of Vologda Oblast in Russia

Nikolsky District is the name of several administrative and municipal districts in Russia:

- Nikolsky District, Penza Oblast, an administrative and municipal district of Penza Oblast
- Nikolsky District, Vologda Oblast, an administrative and municipal district of Vologda Oblast

== See also ==
- Nikolsky (disambiguation)
