= Nikolskoye Urban Settlement =

Nikolskoye Urban Settlement is the name of several municipal formations in Leningrad Oblast, Russia.

- Nikolskoye Urban Settlement, a municipal formation corresponding to Nikolskoye Settlement Municipal Formation, an administrative division of Tosnensky District
- Nikolskoye Urban Settlement, a municipal formation corresponding to Nikolskoye Settlement Municipal Formation, an administrative division of Podporozhsky District

== See also ==
- Nikolsky
