= Nikolskoye, Aurgazinsky District, Republic of Bashkortostan =

Nikolskoye Никольское
- Selo
- Location within Bashkortostan Location within Russia
- Coordinates: 54°12′N 56°00′E
- Country: Russia
- Region: Bashkortostan
- District: Aurgazinsky District
- Time zone: UTC+5:00

Nikolskoye (Russian: Никольское) is a rural locality (a selo) in Ismagilovsky Selsoviet, Aurgazinsky District, Bashkortostan, Russia. The population was 18 as of 2010.

== Geography ==
Nikolskoye is located 29 km north of Tolbazy (the district's administrative centre) by road. The nearest rural locality is Novotimoshkino.
