= Nikolskoye, Syamzhensky District, Vologda Oblast =

Nikolskoye Никольское
- Village
- Location within Vologda Oblast Location within Russia
- Coordinates: 59°52′N 41°10′E
- Country: Russia
- Region: Vologda Oblast
- District: Syamzhensky District
- Time zone: UTC+3:00

Nikolskoye (Russian: Никольское) is a rural locality (a village) in Zhityovskoye Rural Settlement, Syamzhensky District, Vologda Oblast, Russia. The population was 15 as of 2002.

== Geography ==
Nikolskoye is located 26 km southeast of Syamzha (the district's administrative centre) by road. Levinskaya is the nearest rural locality.
