= Nikolskoye, Ivanovsky District, Ivanovo Oblast =

Nikolskoye Никольское
- Selo
- Location within Ivanovo Oblast Location within Russia
- Coordinates: 57°05′N 41°09′E
- Country: Russia
- Region: Ivanovo Oblast
- District: Ivanovsky District
- Time zone: UTC+3:00

Nikolskoye (Russian: Никольское) is a rural locality (a selo) in Ivanovsky District, Ivanovo Oblast, Russia. Population: 85 (2010 census); 132 (2002 census);

== Geography ==
This rural locality is located 16 km from Ivanovo (the district's administrative centre and capital of Ivanovo Oblast) and 261 km from Moscow. Skalozubka is the nearest rural locality.
