= Nikolsky, Liskinsky District, Voronezh Oblast =

Nikolsky Никольский
- Khutor
- Location within Voronezh Oblast Location within Russia
- Coordinates: 50°56′N 39°33′E
- Country: Russia
- Region: Voronezh Oblast
- District: Liskinsky District
- Time zone: UTC+3:00

Nikolsky (Russian: Никольский) is a rural locality (a khutor) in Zaluzhenskoye Rural Settlement, Liskinsky District, Voronezh Oblast, Russia. The population was 652 as of 2010. There are 13 streets.

== Geography ==
Nikolsky is located 13 km southeast of Liski (the district's administrative centre) by road. Zaluzhnoye is the nearest rural locality.
