= Nikolskoye, Mezhdurechensky District, Vologda Oblast =

Nikolskoye Никольское
- Village
- Location within Vologda Oblast Location within Russia
- Coordinates: 59°15′N 40°56′E
- Country: Russia
- Region: Vologda Oblast
- District: Mezhdurechensky District
- Time zone: UTC+3:00

Nikolskoye (Russian: Никольское) is a rural locality (a village) in Sheybukhtovskoye Rural Settlement, Mezhdurechensky District, Vologda Oblast, Russia. The population was 16 as of 2002.

== Geography ==
Nikolskoye is located 22 km southwest of Shuyskoye (the district's administrative centre) by road. Tupitsyno is the nearest rural locality.
