= Nikolskoye, Paninsky District, Voronezh Oblast =

Nikolskoye Никольское
- Selo
- Location within Voronezh Oblast Location within Russia
- Coordinates: 51°37′N 40°21′E
- Country: Russia
- Region: Voronezh Oblast
- District: Paninsky District
- Time zone: UTC+3:00

Nikolskoye (Russian: Никольское) is a rural locality (a selo) in Progressovskoye Rural Settlement, Paninsky District, Voronezh Oblast, Russia. The population was 125 as of 2010. There are 2 streets.

== Geography ==
Nikolskoye is located 20 km east of Panino (the district's administrative centre) by road. Maryevka is the nearest rural locality.
