= Nikolskoye, Vashkinsky District, Vologda Oblast =

Nikolskoye Никольское
- Village
- Location within Vologda Oblast Location within Russia
- Coordinates: 60°25′N 37°16′E
- Country: Russia
- Region: Vologda Oblast
- District: Vashkinsky District
- Time zone: UTC+3:00

Nikolskoye (Russian: Никольское) is a rural locality (a village) in Pokrovskoye Rural Settlement, Vashkinsky District, Vologda Oblast, Russia. The population was 20 as of 2002.

== Geography ==
Nikolskoye is located 72 km northwest of Lipin Bor (the district's administrative centre) by road. Dryabloye is the nearest rural locality.
