= Nikolsk, Nikolsky District, Penza Oblast =

Town in Penza Oblast, Russia

Nikolsk Никольск
- Town
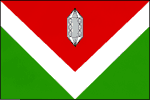
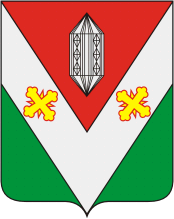
- Flag Coat of arms
- Interactive map of Nikolsk
- Location of Nikolsk Nikolsk (Penza Oblast)
- Coordinates: 53°42′52″N 46°05′03″E
- Country: Russia
- Federal subject: Penza Oblast
- Administrative district: Nikolsky District
- Town of district significanceSelsoviet: Nikolsk
- Founded: 1761
- Town status since: 1954
- Elevation: 240 m (790 ft)

Population (2010 Census)
  - Total: 22,471
  - Estimate (2021): 19,873 (−11.6%)

Administrative status
  - Capital of: Nikolsky District, town of district significance of Nikolsk

Municipal status
  - Municipal district: Nikolsky Municipal District
  - Urban settlement: Nikolsk Urban Settlement
  - Capital of: Nikolsky Municipal District, Nikolsk Urban Settlement
- Time zone: UTC+3 (MSK)
- Postal codes: 442680–442683, 442699
- OKTMO ID: 56653101001

Nikolsk (Russian: Нико́льск) is a town and the administrative center of Nikolsky District in Penza Oblast, Russia, located on the Vyrgan River 120 kilometers (75 mi) northeast of Penza, the administrative center of the oblast. Population: 22,471 (2010 census); 24,061 (2002 census); 26,871 (1989 Soviet census).

== History ==
It was established in place of the villages of Nikolskoye (Нико́льское), known since 1668, and Pestrovka (Пестровка), known since the 1680s. It was called Nikolo-Pestrovka (Нико́ло-Пестровка) in 1761 and was granted urban-type settlement status in 1928. It was granted town status in 1954.

== Administrative and municipal status ==
Within the framework of administrative divisions, Nikolsk serves as the administrative center of Nikolsky District. As an administrative division, it is incorporated within Nikolsky District as the town of district significance of Nikolsk. As a municipal division, the town of district significance of Nikolsk is incorporated within Nikolsky Municipal District as Nikolsk Urban Settlement.
