= Nikolsky, Birsk, Republic of Bashkortostan =

Nikolsky Никольский
- Village
- Location within Bashkortostan Location within Russia
- Coordinates: 55°22′N 55°29′E
- Country: Russia
- Region: Bashkortostan
- District: Birsky District
- Time zone: UTC+5:00

Nikolsky (Russian: Никольский) is a rural locality (a village) in Birsk, Birsky District, Bashkortostan, Russia. The population was 85 as of 2010. There are two streets.

== Geography ==
It is located on the Belaya River.
