= Nikolsk, Altai Krai =

Nikolsk Никольск
- Selo
- Location within Altai Krai Location within Russia
- Coordinates: 51°21′N 81°54′E
- Country: Russia
- Region: Altai Krai
- District: Zmeinogorsky District
- Time zone: UTC+7:00

Nikolsk (Russian: Никольск) is a rural locality (a selo) and the administrative center of Nikolsky Selsoviet, Zmeinogorsky District, Altai Krai, Russia. The population was 280 as of 2013. There are 7 streets.

== Geography ==
Nikolsk is located 35 km northwest of Zmeinogorsk (the district's administrative centre) by road. Kuzminka is the nearest rural locality.
