= Nikolskoye, Cherepovetsky District, Vologda Oblast =

Nikolskoye Никольское
- Selo
- Location within Vologda Oblast Location within Russia
- Coordinates: 59°20′N 37°33′E
- Country: Russia
- Region: Vologda Oblast
- District: Cherepovetsky District
- Time zone: UTC+3:00

Nikolskoye (Russian: Никольское) is a rural locality (a selo) in Abakanovskoye Rural Settlement, Cherepovetsky District, Vologda Oblast, Russia. The population was 46 as of 2002. There are five streets.

== Geography ==
Nikolskoye is located 43 km (27 mi) northwest of Cherepovets (the district's administrative centre) by road. Yartsevo is the nearest rural locality.
