= Nikolskoye, Sheksninsky District, Vologda Oblast =

Nikolskoye Никольское
- Village
- Location within Vologda Oblast Location within Russia
- Coordinates: 59°08′N 38°38′E
- Country: Russia
- Region: Vologda Oblast
- District: Sheksninsky District
- Time zone: UTC+3:00

Nikolskoye (Russian: Никольское) is a rural locality (a village) in Yershovskoye Rural Settlement, Sheksninsky District, Vologda Oblast, Russia. The population was 8 as of 2002.

== Geography ==
Nikolskoye is located 13 km southeast of Sheksna (the district's administrative centre) by road. Samsonitsa is the nearest rural locality.
