= Nikolai Nikolsky =

Soviet-Russian religious historian

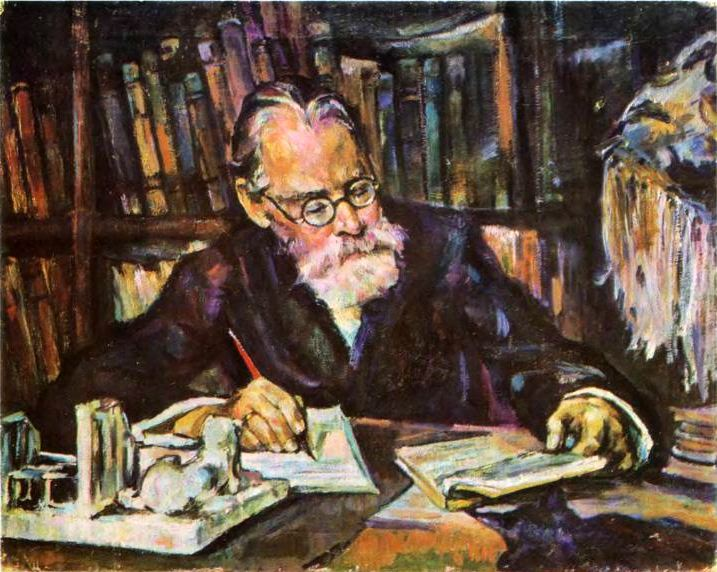
Nikolay Tarasikov. Portrait of the Honored Worker of the BSSR, academist N. M. Nikolsky (1940)

Nikolai Mikhailovich Nikolsky (Russian: Николай Михайлович Никольский; 13 November 1877 – 19 November 1959) was a Russian and Soviet religious historian, orientalist and biblical scholar. He became a corresponding member of Academy of Sciences of the Soviet Union in 1946.

== Sources ==
"Никольский Николай". Электронная еврейская энциклопедия ОРТ (in Russian).
