= Nikolskoye, Talovsky District, Voronezh Oblast =

Nikolskoye Никольское
- Selo
- Location within Voronezh Oblast Location within Russia
- Coordinates: 51°06′N 40°26′E
- Country: Russia
- Region: Voronezh Oblast
- District: Talovsky District
- Time zone: UTC+3:00

Nikolskoye (Russian: Никольское) is a rural locality (a selo) in Novochigolskoye Rural Settlement, Talovsky District, Voronezh Oblast, Russia. The population was 744 as of 2010. There are 8 streets.

== Geography ==
Nikolskoye is located 37 km west of Talovaya (the district's administrative centre) by road. Khrenovoye is the nearest rural locality.
