= Nikolskoye, Anninsky District, Voronezh Oblast =

Nikolskoye Никольское
- Selo
- Location within Voronezh Oblast Location within Russia
- Coordinates: 51°28′N 40°57′E
- Country: Russia
- Region: Voronezh Oblast
- District: Anninsky District
- Time zone: UTC+3:00

Nikolskoye (Russian: Никольское) is a rural locality (a selo) and the administrative center of Nikolayevskoye Rural Settlement, Anninsky District, Voronezh Oblast, Russia. The population was 1,019 as of 2010. There are 14 streets.

== Geography ==
Nikolskoye is located 41 km east of Anna (the district's administrative centre) by road. Ostrovki is the nearest rural locality.
