= Nikolskoye, Altaysky District, Altai Krai =

Nikolskoye Никольское
- Selo
- Location within Altai Krai Location within Russia
- Coordinates: 51°47′N 84°59′E
- Country: Russia
- Region: Altai Krai
- District: Altaysky District
- Time zone: UTC+7:00

Nikolskoye (Russian: Никольское) is a rural locality (a selo) in Kuyagansky Selsoviet, Altaysky District, Altai Krai, Russia. The population was 34 as of 2013. There are 3 streets.

== Geography ==
Nikolskoye is located on the Barancha River, 38 km southwest of Altayskoye (the district's administrative centre) by road. Kuyagan is the nearest rural locality.
