= Nikolskoye, Kaduysky District, Vologda Oblast =

Nikolskoye Никольское
- Selo
- Location within Vologda Oblast Location within Russia
- Coordinates: 59°21′N 37°10′E
- Country: Russia
- Region: Vologda Oblast
- District: Kaduysky District
- Time zone: UTC+3:00

Nikolskoye (Russian: Никольское) is a rural locality (a selo) and the administrative center of Nikolskoye Rural Settlement, Kaduysky District, Vologda Oblast, Russia. The population was 397 as of 2002. There are 15 streets.

== Geography ==
Nikolskoye is located 25 km north of Kaduy (the district's administrative centre) by road. Novoye is the nearest rural locality.
