= Alexander A. Nikolsky =

Russian-born American aeronautical engineer

Alexander Alexandrovitch Nikolsky (Russian: Александр Александрович Никольский, 1903–1963) was a Russian-born American aeronautical engineer who worked in the domain of rotary-wing aircraft.

Professor Alexander Alexandrovitch Nikolsky (nicknamed "Nick"), was born in 1903 in the Russian Empire. He began his career as a cadet in the Russian Imperial Navy. He served on a naval training ship in Vladivostok when the Revolution of 1917 overwhelmed Russia. He and his fellow cadets took the ship and sailed it to Japan. He later made his way to Cairo and then to Paris. The White Russian community in Paris took him in hand and entered him into the Sorbonne, where he received certificates in mathematics and physical mechanics. Before he left Paris he also qualified for an electrical and mechanical engineering degree.

During his years in Paris, he concluded that his future lay westward and, not waiting for legal entry documents, he signed on a merchant ship as a sailor. He arrived in Philadelphia in 1928, jumped ship, and worked his way to Boston, where the Russian community again sponsored his further education, entering him in the Aeronautical Engineering Department of the Massachusetts Institute of Technology. He graduated the following year, receiving an M.S. in Aeronautical Engineering, and was immediately employed by Igor Sikorsky, President of Sikorsky Aircraft. He became an American citizen several years later.

Nikolsky spent 13 years at the Sikorsky Aircraft Division of the United Aircraft Corporation (now United Technologies Corporation), serving successively and successfully as stress engineer, Chief of Structures, and Assistant Chief of Design. More importantly, he became a part of a small nucleus of engineers who worked with Igor Sikorsky to develop the world's first practical helicopter, the VS-300. The interest which developed during his career phase colored his remaining professional life.

When the Department of Aeronautical Engineering was formed at Princeton University in 1942, Nick left Sikorsky and became the second faculty member of the new department. He rose to the rank of Professor two years later, and overcoming the handicap of illness, in 1954, became the first incumbent of the Robert Porter Patterson Chair in Aeronautical Engineering.

The simplest way to describe Nikolsky's technical achievements is to say that he dominated a new and important field. His domain was the field of rotary wing aircraft, exemplified first and most strikingly by the helicopter, and later by the new category of aircraft known as vertical takeoff and landing machines. His original work with the small group at Sikorsky created a technical breakthrough. At Princeton, as a research team leader, he provided information crucially important to rotary wing aircraft designers and pioneered the development of a facility for the dynamic simulation of those aircraft which was unique in the world. He profoundly influenced the growth of research in the expanding Aeronautical Engineering Department, especially with rotary wing, to the point where Princeton became the foremost center of knowledge in that area. At Princeton, Nikolsky wrote two books, including the first definitive text on the analysis and design of rotary-wing aircraft: Notes on Helicopter Design Theory (1945) and Helicopter Analysis (1951).

In 1981, the American Helicopter Society (now AHS International) created the annual Alexander A. Nikolsky Honorary Lectureship, "Given to an individual who has a highly distinguished career in vertical flight aircraft research and development and is skilled at communicating their technical knowledge and experience."
