= Nikolsky, Ertilsky District, Voronezh Oblast =

Nikolsky Никольский
- Settlement
- Location within Voronezh Oblast Location within Russia
- Coordinates: 51°46′N 40°50′E
- Country: Russia
- Region: Voronezh Oblast
- District: Ertilsky District
- Time zone: UTC+3:00

Nikolsky (Russian: Никольский) is a rural locality (a settlement) in Ertil, Ertilsky District, Voronezh Oblast, Russia. The population was 89 as of 2010. There are 3 streets.

== Geography ==
Nikolsky is located 8 km southeast of Ertil (the district's administrative centre) by road. Vasilyevka is the nearest rural locality.
