= Nikolskaya, Verkhovazhsky District, Vologda Oblast =

Nikolskaya Никольская
- Village
- Location within Vologda Oblast Location within Russia
- Coordinates: 60°36′N 41°23′E
- Country: Russia
- Region: Vologda Oblast
- District: Verkhovazhsky District
- Time zone: UTC+3:00

Nikolskaya (Russian: Никольская) is a rural locality (a village) in Verkhovskoye Rural Settlement, Verkhovazhsky District, Vologda Oblast, Russia. The population was 16 as of 2002.

== Geography ==
Nikolskaya is located 53 km southwest of Verkhovazhye (the district's administrative centre) by road. Borovskaya is the nearest rural locality.
