= Nikolskoye, Yenotayevsky District, Astrakhan Oblast =

Nikolskoye Никольское
- Selo
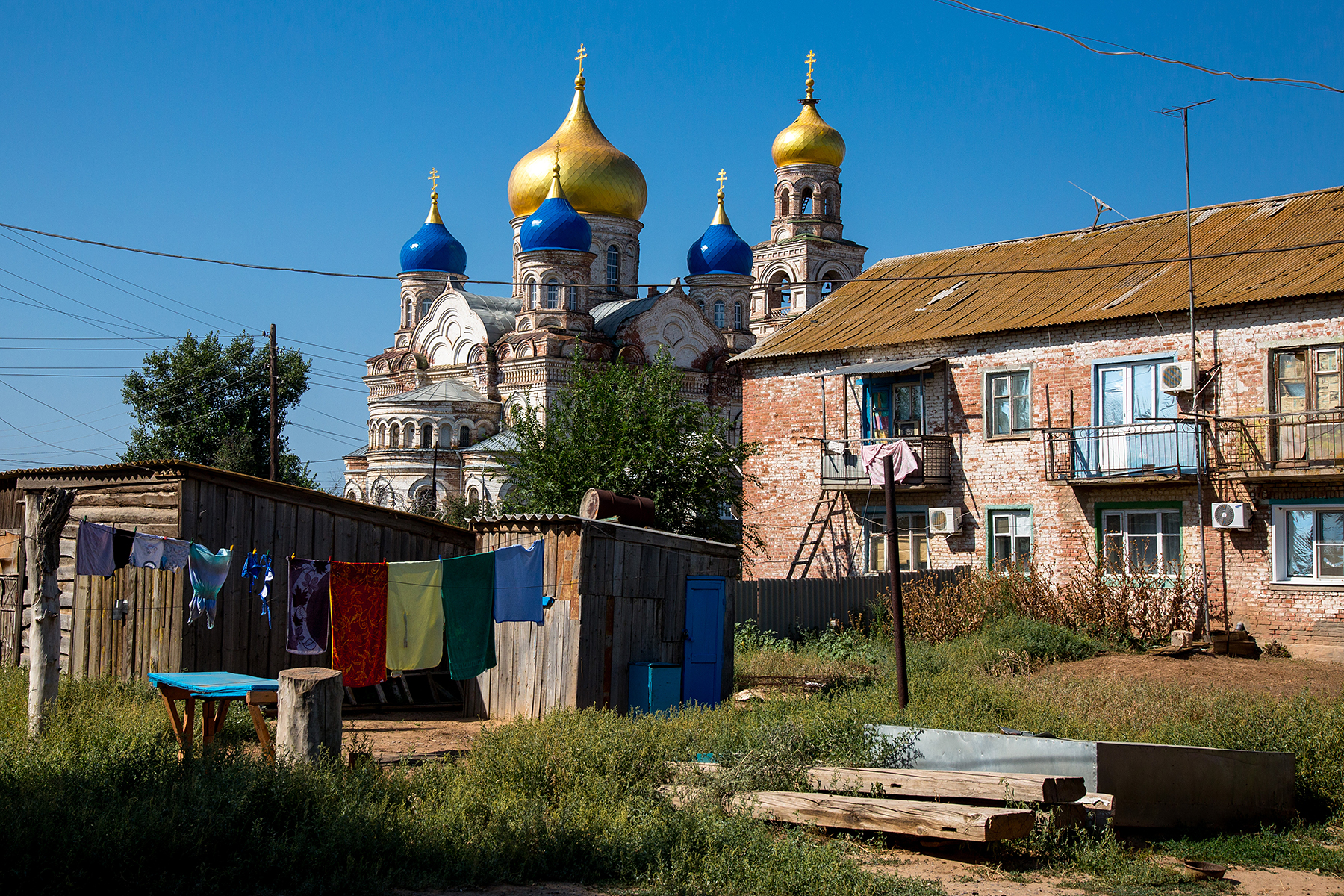

- Location within Astrakhan Oblast Location within Russia
- Coordinates: 47°45′N 46°24′E
- Country: Russia
- Region: Astrakhan Oblast
- District: Yenotayevsky District
- Time zone: UTC+4:00

Nikolskoye (Russian: Никольское) is a rural locality (a selo) and the administrative center of Nikolsky Selsoviet of Yenotayevsky District, Astrakhan Oblast, Russia. The population was 5,234 as of 2010. There are 62 streets.

== Geography ==
Nikolskoye is located 82 km northwest of Yenotayevka (the district's administrative centre) by road. Grachi is the nearest rural locality.
