= Nikolskoye, Krasnokamsky District, Republic of Bashkortostan =

Nikolskoye Никольское
- Selo
- Location within Bashkortostan Location within Russia
- Coordinates: 56°10′N 54°33′E
- Country: Russia
- Region: Bashkortostan
- District: Krasnokamsky District
- Time zone: UTC+5:00

Nikolskoye (Russian: Никольское) is a rural locality (a selo) and the administrative centre of Nikolsky Selsoviet, Krasnokamsky District, Bashkortostan, Russia. The population was 496 as of 2010. There are 9 streets.

== Geography ==
Nikolskoye is located 30 km northeast of Nikolo-Beryozovka (the district's administrative centre) by road. Biktimirovo is the nearest rural locality.
