= Nikolskoye, Ilyinsky District, Ivanovo Oblast =

Nikolskoye Никольское
- Village
- Location within Ivanovo Oblast Location within Russia
- Coordinates: 56°50′N 39°44′E
- Country: Russia
- Region: Ivanovo Oblast
- District: Ilyinsky District
- Time zone: UTC+3:00

Nikolskoye (Russian: Никольское) is a rural locality (a selo) in Ilyinsky District, Ivanovo Oblast, Russia. Population: 33 (2010 census);

== Geography ==
This rural locality is located 14 kilometres (8.7 mi) from Ilyinskoye-Khovanskoye (the district's administrative centre), 77 kilometres (48 mi) from Ivanovo (capital of Ivanovo Oblast) and 177 kilometres (110 mi) from Moscow. Novosyolki is the nearest rural locality.
