= Nikolskoye, Sterlibashevsky District, Republic of Bashkortostan =

Nikolskoye Никольское
- Village
- Location within Bashkortostan Location within Russia
- Coordinates: 53°28′N 55°17′E
- Country: Russia
- Region: Bashkortostan
- District: Sterlibashevsky District
- Time zone: UTC+5:00

Nikolskoye (Russian: Никольское) is a rural locality (a village) in Sterlibashevsky Selsoviet, Sterlibashevsky District, Bashkortostan, Russia. The population was 70 as of 2010. There are 3 streets.

== Geography ==
Nikolskoye is located 7 km north of Sterlibashevo (the district's administrative centre) by road. Pervomaysky is the nearest rural locality.
