= Nikolsk, Kabansky District, Republic of Buryatia =

Nikolsk Никольск
- Selo
- Location within Republic of Buryatia Location within Russia
- Coordinates: 52°04′N 106°52′E
- Country: Russia
- Region: Republic of Buryatia
- District: Kabansky District
- Time zone: UTC+8:00

Nikolsk (Russian: Никольск) is a rural locality (a selo) in Kabansky District, Republic of Buryatia, Russia. The population was 194 as of 2010. There are 3 streets.

== Geography ==
Nikolsk is located 25 km east of Kabansk (the district's administrative centre) by road. Treskovo is the nearest rural locality.
