= Nikolskoye, Blagoveshchensky District, Republic of Bashkortostan =

Nikolskoye Никольское
- Village
- Location within Bashkortostan Location within Russia
- Coordinates: 55°06′N 56°15′E
- Country: Russia
- Region: Bashkortostan
- District: Blagoveshchensky District
- Time zone: UTC+5:00

Nikolskoye (Russian: Никольское) is a rural locality (a village) in Ilyino-Polyansky Selsoviet, Blagoveshchensky District, Bashkortostan, Russia. The population was 3 as of 2010. There is 1 street.

== Geography ==
Nikolskoye is located 29 km northeast of Blagoveshchensk (the district's administrative centre) by road. Pokrovskoye is the nearest rural locality.
