= Nikolsk, Tatyshlinsky District, Republic of Bashkortostan =

Nikolsk Никольск
- Village
- Location within Bashkortostan Location within Russia
- Coordinates: 56°16′N 55°48′E
- Country: Russia
- Region: Bashkortostan
- District: Tatyshlinsky District
- Time zone: UTC+5:00

Nikolsk (Russian: Никольск) is a rural locality (a village) in Verkhnetatyshlinsky Selsoviet, Tatyshlinsky District, Bashkortostan, Russia. The population was 25 as of 2010. There is 1 street.

== Geography ==
Nikolsk is located 4 km southwest of Verkhniye Tatyshly (the district's administrative centre) by road. Nizhniye Talyshly is the nearest rural locality.
