= Nikolskoye, Miyakinsky District, Republic of Bashkortostan =

Nikolskoye Никольское
- Village
- Location within Bashkortostan Location within Russia
- Coordinates: 53°36′N 54°54′E
- Country: Russia
- Region: Bashkortostan
- District: Miyakinsky District
- Time zone: UTC+5:00

Nikolskoye (Russian: Никольское) is a rural locality (a village) in Miyakinsky Selsoviet, Miyakinsky District, Bashkortostan, Russia. The population was 59 as of 2010. There is 1 street.

== Geography ==
Nikolskoye is located 9 km southeast of Kirgiz-Miyaki (the district's administrative centre) by road. Anyasevo is the nearest rural locality.
