= Nikolsk, Aurgazinsky District, Republic of Bashkortostan =

Nikolsk Никольск
- Village
- Location within Bashkortostan Location within Russia
- Coordinates: 54°12′N 56°00′E
- Country: Russia
- Region: Bashkortostan
- District: Aurgazinsky District
- Time zone: UTC+5:00

Nikolsk (Russian: Никольск) is a rural locality (a village) in Tolbazinsky Selsoviet, Aurgazinsky District, Bashkortostan, Russia. The population was 49 as of 2010. There is 1 street.

== Geography ==
Nikolsk is located 9 km west of Tolbazy (the district's administrative centre) by road. Kultura is the nearest rural locality.
