= Nikolskoye, Komsomolsky District, Ivanovo Oblast =

Nikolskoye Никольское
- Village
- Location within Ivanovo Oblast Location within Russia
- Coordinates: 56°57′N 40°19′E
- Country: Russia
- Region: Ivanovo Oblast
- District: Komsomolsky District
- Time zone: UTC+3:00

Nikolskoye (Russian: Никольское) is a rural locality (a selo) in Komsomolsky District, Ivanovo Oblast, Russia. Population: 267 (2010 census);

== Geography ==
This rural locality is located 9 kilometres (5.6 mi) from Komsomolsk (the district's administrative centre), 39 kilometres (24 mi) from Ivanovo (capital of Ivanovo Oblast) and 212 kilometres (132 mi) from Moscow. Kholodilovo is the nearest rural locality.
