= Nikolskoye, Nurimanovsky District, Republic of Bashkortostan =

Nikolskoye Никольское
- Selo
- Location within Bashkortostan Location within Russia
- Coordinates: 55°11′N 56°48′E
- Country: Russia
- Region: Bashkortostan
- District: Nurimanovsky District
- Time zone: UTC+5:00

Nikolskoye (Russian: Никольское) is a rural locality (a selo) and the administrative centre of Nikolsky Selsoviet, Nurimanovsky District, Bashkortostan, Russia. The population was 627 as of 2010. There are 4 streets.

== Geography ==
Nikolskoye is located 9 km east of Krasnaya Gorka (the district's administrative centre) by road. Baykal is the nearest rural locality.
