= Nikolskaya, Sokolsky District, Vologda Oblast =

Nikolskaya Никольская
- Village
- Location within Vologda Oblast Location within Russia
- Coordinates: 59°35′N 41°46′E
- Country: Russia
- Region: Vologda Oblast
- District: Sokolsky District
- Time zone: UTC+3:00

Nikolskaya (Russian: Никольская) is a rural locality (a village) in Biryakovskoye Rural Settlement, Sokolsky District, Vologda Oblast, Russia. The population was 7 as of 2002.

== Geography ==
The distance to Sokol is 118 km (73.3 mi), to Biryakovo is 18 km (11.2 mi). Borshchovka is the nearest rural locality.
