= Nikolsk, Tunkinsky District, Republic of Buryatia =

Nikolsk Никольск
- Selo
- Location within Republic of Buryatia Location within Russia
- Coordinates: 51°43′N 102°34′E
- Country: Russia
- Region: Republic of Buryatia
- District: Tunkinsky District
- Time zone: UTC+8:00

Nikolsk (Russian: Никольск) is a rural locality (a selo) in Tunkinsky District, Republic of Buryatia, Russia. The population was 125 as of 2010. There are 2 streets.

== Geography ==
Nikolsk is located 37 km east of Kyren (the district's administrative centre) by road. Tunka is the nearest rural locality.
