= Novotimoshkino =

Novotimoshkino Новотимошкино
- Village
- Location within Bashkortostan Location within Russia
- Coordinates: 54°12′N 55°59′E
- Country: Russia
- Region: Bashkortostan
- District: Aurgazinsky District
- Time zone: UTC+5:00

Novotimoshkino (Russian: Новотимошкино; Bashkir: Яңы Тимешкә, Yañı Timeşkä) is a rural locality (a village) in Ismagilovsky Selsoviet, Aurgazinsky District, Bashkortostan, Russia. The population was 144 as of 2010. There are 4 streets.

== Geography ==
Novotimoshkino is located 27 km north of Tolbazy (the district's administrative centre) by road. Nikolskoye is the nearest rural locality.
