= Nikolskoye, Buzdyaksky District, Republic of Bashkortostan =

Nikolskoye Никольское
- Selo
- Location within Bashkortostan Location within Russia
- Coordinates: 54°27′N 54°33′E
- Country: Russia
- Region: Bashkortostan
- District: Buzdyaksky District
- Time zone: UTC+5:00

Nikolskoye (Russian: Никольское) is a rural locality (a selo) in Gafuriysky Selsoviet, Buzdyaksky District, Bashkortostan, Russia. The population was 270 as of 2010. There are 2 streets.

== Geography ==
Nikolskoye is located 16 km south of Buzdyak (the district's administrative centre) by road. Novokilimovo is the nearest rural locality.
