= Nikolskoye, Belgorodsky District, Belgorod Oblast =

Nikolskoye Никольское
- Selo
- Location within Belgorod Oblast Location within Russia
- Coordinates: 50°26′N 36°34′E
- Country: Russia
- Region: Belgorod Oblast
- District: Belgorodsky District
- Time zone: UTC+3:00

Nikolskoye (Russian: Никольское) is a rural locality (a selo) and the administrative center of Nikolskoye Rural Settlement, Belgorodsky District, Belgorod Oblast, Russia. Population: 7,443 (2021 census); 2,778 (2010 census). There are 139 streets.

== History ==
In ancient times, the village was named "Khlopovka", serving as a stop for travelers. In 1775, a church was built in the middle of the village in honor of St. Nicholas, and the village began to be called "Nikolskoye".

By the 1920s, there were 140 households in the village and the villagers mainly consisted of poor and middle-class people.

=== Russian invasion of Ukraine ===
In March 2024, Belgorod region Governor Vyacheslav Gladkov reported a man and a teenager were killed in the village during a Ukrainian air strike.

In July 2024 three people were reportedly killed in shelling, several more were injured.

== Geography ==
Nikolskoye is located 25 km southeast of Maysky (the district's administrative centre) by road. Brodok is the nearest rural locality.
