= Nikolsk, Yanaulsky District, Republic of Bashkortostan =

Nikolsk Никольск
- Village
- Location within Bashkortostan Location within Russia
- Coordinates: 56°08′N 55°07′E
- Country: Russia
- Region: Bashkortostan
- District: Yanaulsky District
- Time zone: UTC+5:00

Nikolsk (Russian: Никольск) is a rural locality (a village) in Orlovsky Selsoviet, Yanaulsky District, Bashkortostan, Russia. The population was 126 as of 2010. There is 1 street.

== Geography ==
Nikolsk is located 21 km southeast of Yanaul (the district's administrative centre) by road. Igrovka is the nearest rural locality.
