= Nikolskoye, Sokolsky District, Vologda Oblast =

Nikolskoye Никольское
- Village
- Location within Vologda Oblast Location within Russia
- Coordinates: 59°37′N 41°18′E
- Country: Russia
- Region: Vologda Oblast
- District: Sokolsky District
- Time zone: UTC+3:00

Nikolskoye (Russian: Никольское) is a rural locality (a village) in Chuchkovskoye Rural Settlement, Sokolsky District, Vologda Oblast, Russia. The population was 14 as of 2002.

== Geography ==
The distance to Sokol is 87 km, to Chuchkovo is 5 km. Vaskovo is the nearest rural locality.
