= Nikolsky, Podgorensky District, Voronezh Oblast =

Nikolsky Никольский
- Khutor
- Location within Voronezh Oblast Location within Russia
- Coordinates: 50°23′N 39°36′E
- Country: Russia
- Region: Voronezh Oblast
- District: Podgorensky District
- Time zone: UTC+3:00

Nikolsky (Russian: Нико́льский) is a rural locality (khutor) in the Skororybskoye Rural Settlement of the Podgorensky District, Voronezh Oblast, Russia. The population was 84 as of 2010.

== Geography ==
Nikolsky is located 4 km southwest of Podgorensky (the district's administrative centre) by road, on the Sukhaya Rossosh River. Petropavlovka is the nearest rural locality.
