= Nikolsky, Altai Krai =

Nikolsky Никольский
- Settlement
- Location within Altai Krai Location within Russia
- Coordinates: 54°03′N 85°01′E
- Country: Russia
- Region: Altai Krai
- District: Zalesovsky District
- Time zone: UTC+7:00

Nikolsky (Russian: Никольский) is a rural locality (a settlement) in Borisovsky Selsoviet, Zalesovsky District, Altai Krai, Russia. The population was 85 as of 2013. There are 4 streets.

== Geography ==
Nikolsky is located 24 km northeast of Zalesovo (the district's administrative centre) by road. Borisovo is the nearest rural locality.
