= Nikolskoye, Kamyzyaksky District, Astrakhan Oblast =

Nikolskoye Никольское
- Selo
- Location within Astrakhan Oblast Location within Russia
- Coordinates: 46°09′N 47°55′E
- Country: Russia
- Region: Astrakhan Oblast
- District: Kamyzyaksky District
- Time zone: UTC+4:00

Nikolskoye (Russian: Никольское) is a rural locality (a selo) in Nikolo-Komarovsky Selsoviet, Kamyzyaksky District, Astrakhan Oblast, Russia. The population was 793 as of 2010. There are 22 streets.

== Geography ==
Nikolskoye is located 35 km northwest of Kamyzyak (the district's administrative centre) by road. Posyolok moryakov is the nearest rural locality.
