= Nikolskoye, Sovetsky District, Altai Krai =

Nikolskoye Никольское
- Selo
- Location within Altai Krai Location within Russia
- Coordinates: 52°12′N 85°15′E
- Country: Russia
- Region: Altai Krai
- District: Sovetsky District
- Time zone: UTC+7:00

Nikolskoye (Russian: Никольское) is a rural locality (a selo) and the administrative center of Nikolsky Selsoviet, Sovetsky District, Altai Krai, Russia. The population was 746 as of 2013. There are 16 streets.

== Geography ==
It is located 10 km south-west from Sovetskoye.
