= Nikolsky District, Penza Oblast =

Nikolsky District Никольский район (Russian)
- District
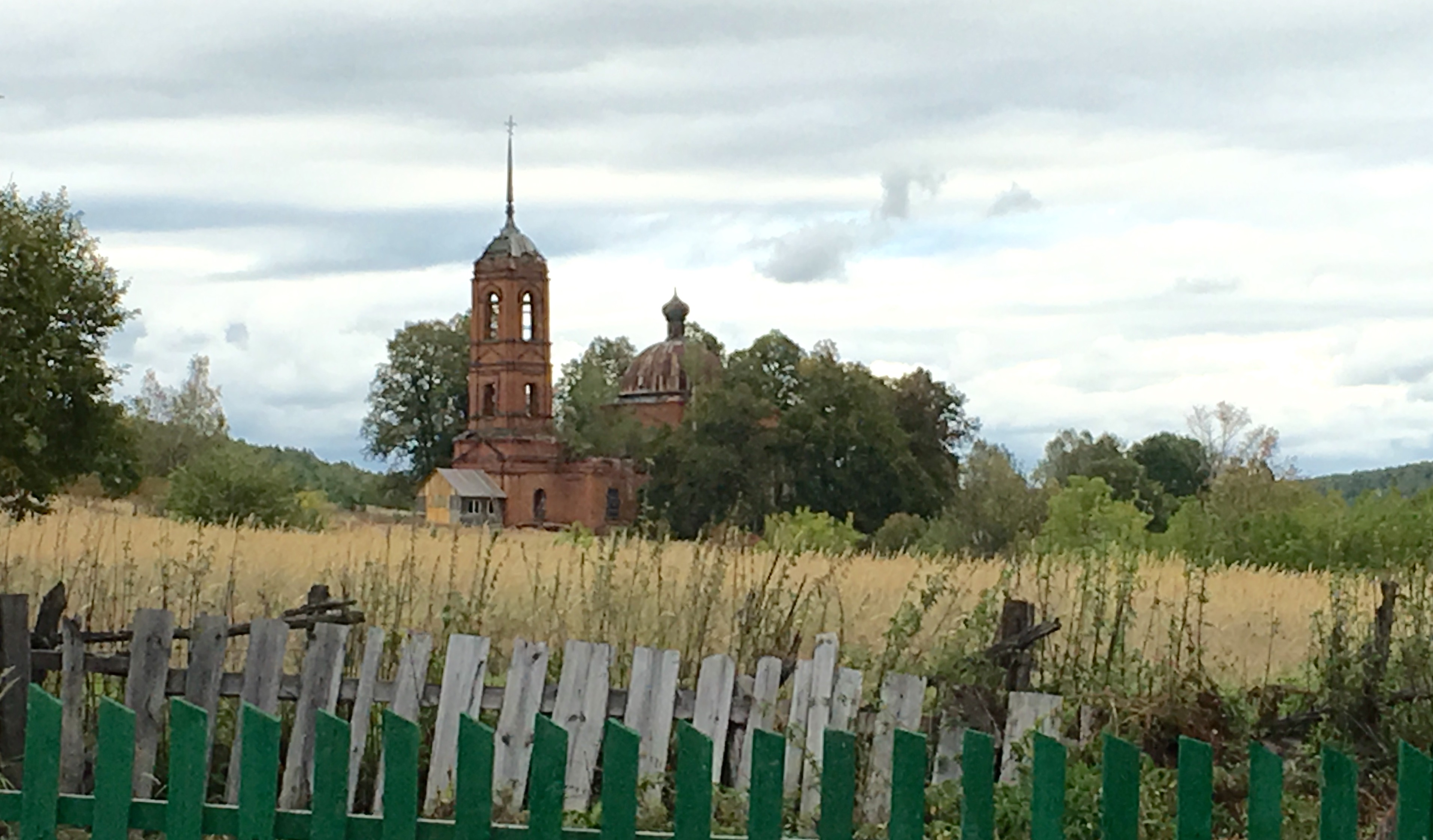
- Church in Nikolsky District

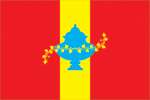
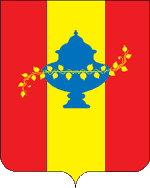
- Flag Coat of arms
- Location of Nikolsky District in Penza Oblast
- Coordinates: 53°43′N 46°05′E
- Country: Russia
- Federal subject: Penza Oblast
- Administrative center: Nikolsk

Area
  - Total: 2,511.9 km^{2} (969.9 sq mi)

Population (2010 Census)
  - Total: 34,271
  - Density: 13.643/km^{2} (35.336/sq mi)
  - Urban: 71.8%
  - Rural: 28.2%

Administrative structure
  - Administrative divisions: 1 Towns of district significance, 1 Work settlements, 10 Selsoviets
  - Inhabited localities: 1 cities/towns, 1 urban-type settlements, 50 rural localities

Municipal structure
  - Municipally incorporated as: Nikolsky Municipal District
  - Municipal divisions: 2 urban settlements, 10 rural settlements
- Time zone: UTC+3 (MSK)
- OKTMO ID: 56653000
- Website: http://rnikolsk.pnzreg.ru/

Nikolsky District (Russian: Нико́льский райо́н) is an administrative and municipal district (raion), one of the twenty-seven in Penza Oblast, Russia. It is located in the northeast of the oblast. The area of the district is 2,511.9 square kilometers (969.9 sq mi). Its administrative center is the town of Nikolsk. Population: 34,271 (2010 Census); 39,175 (2002 census); 46,619 (1989 Soviet census). The population of Nikolsk accounts for 65.6% of the district's total population.
