= Mukhorshibir =

Mukhorshibir Мухоршибирь
- Selo

Other transcription(s)
  - Buryat: Мухар Шэбэр
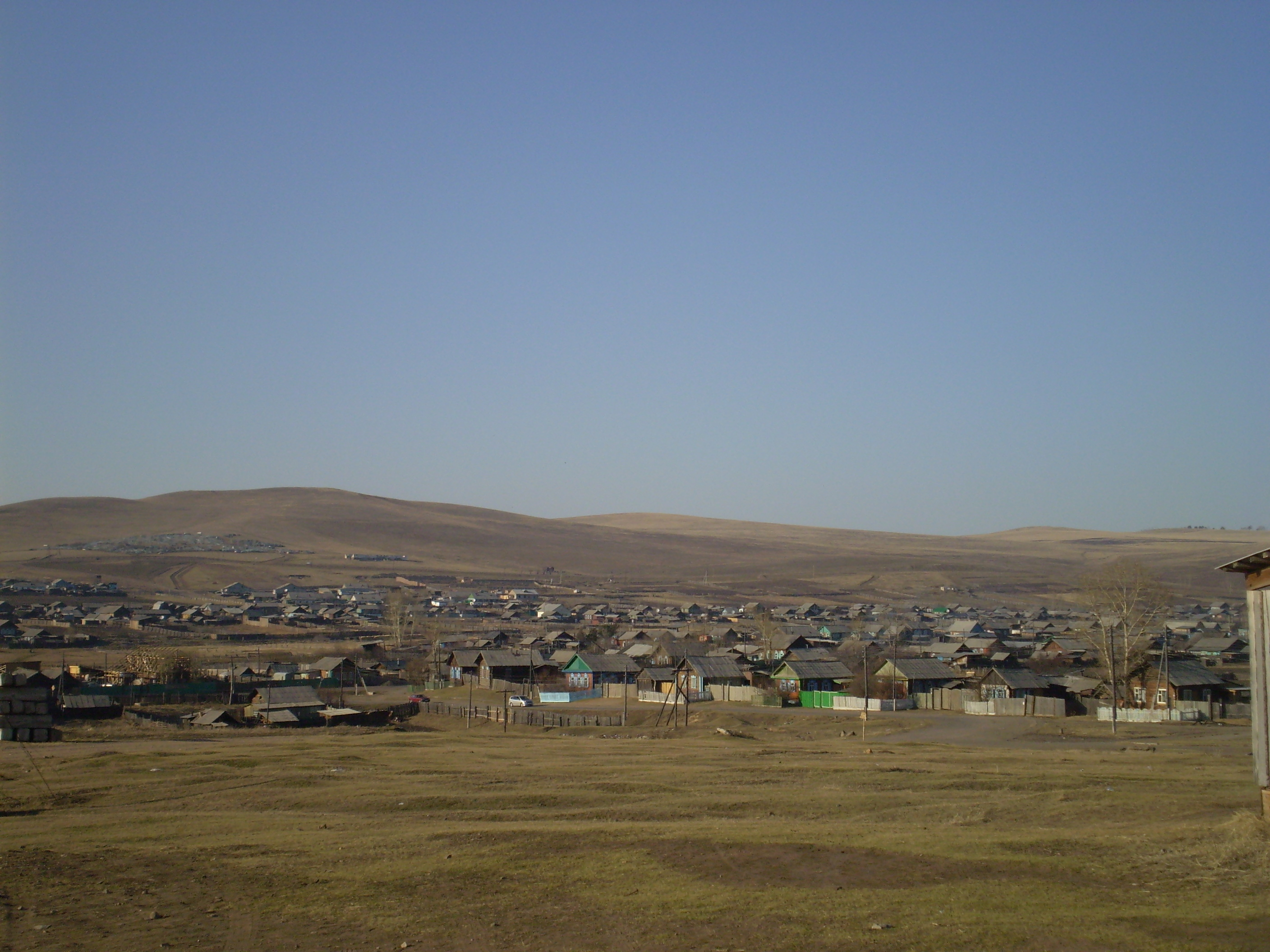

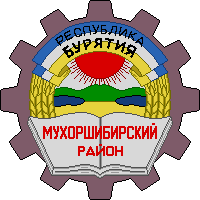
- Coat of arms
- Interactive map of Mukhorshibir
- Location of Mukhorshibir Mukhorshibir (Republic of Buryatia)
- Coordinates: 51°02′49″N 107°49′31″E
- Country: Russia
- Federal subject: Buryatia
- Administrative district: Mukhorshibirsky District
- SelsovietSelsoviet: Mukhorshibirsky
- Founded: 1720

Population (2010 Census)
  - Total: 5,207
  - Estimate (2024): 4,828 (−7.3%)

Administrative status
  - Capital of: Mukhorshibirsky District, Mukhorshibirsky Selsoviet

Municipal status
  - Municipal district: Mukhorshibirsky Municipal District
  - Rural settlement: Mukhorshibirskoye Rural Settlement
  - Capital of: Mukhorshibirsky Municipal District, Mukhorshibirskoye Rural Settlement
- Time zone: UTC+8 (MSK+5)
- Postal code: 671340
- OKTMO ID: 81636425101

Mukhorshibir (Russian: Мухоршиби́рь; Buryat: Мухар Шэбэр, Mukhar Sheber) is a rural locality (a selo) and the administrative center of Mukhorshibirsky District of the Republic of Buryatia, Russia. Population: 5,207 (2010 census); 5,474 (2002 census); 5,903 (1989 Soviet census).
