= Mukhorshibirsky District =

Mukhorshibirsky District Мухоршибирский район (Russian)
- District

Other transcription(s)
  - Buryat: Мухар Шэбэрэй аймаг
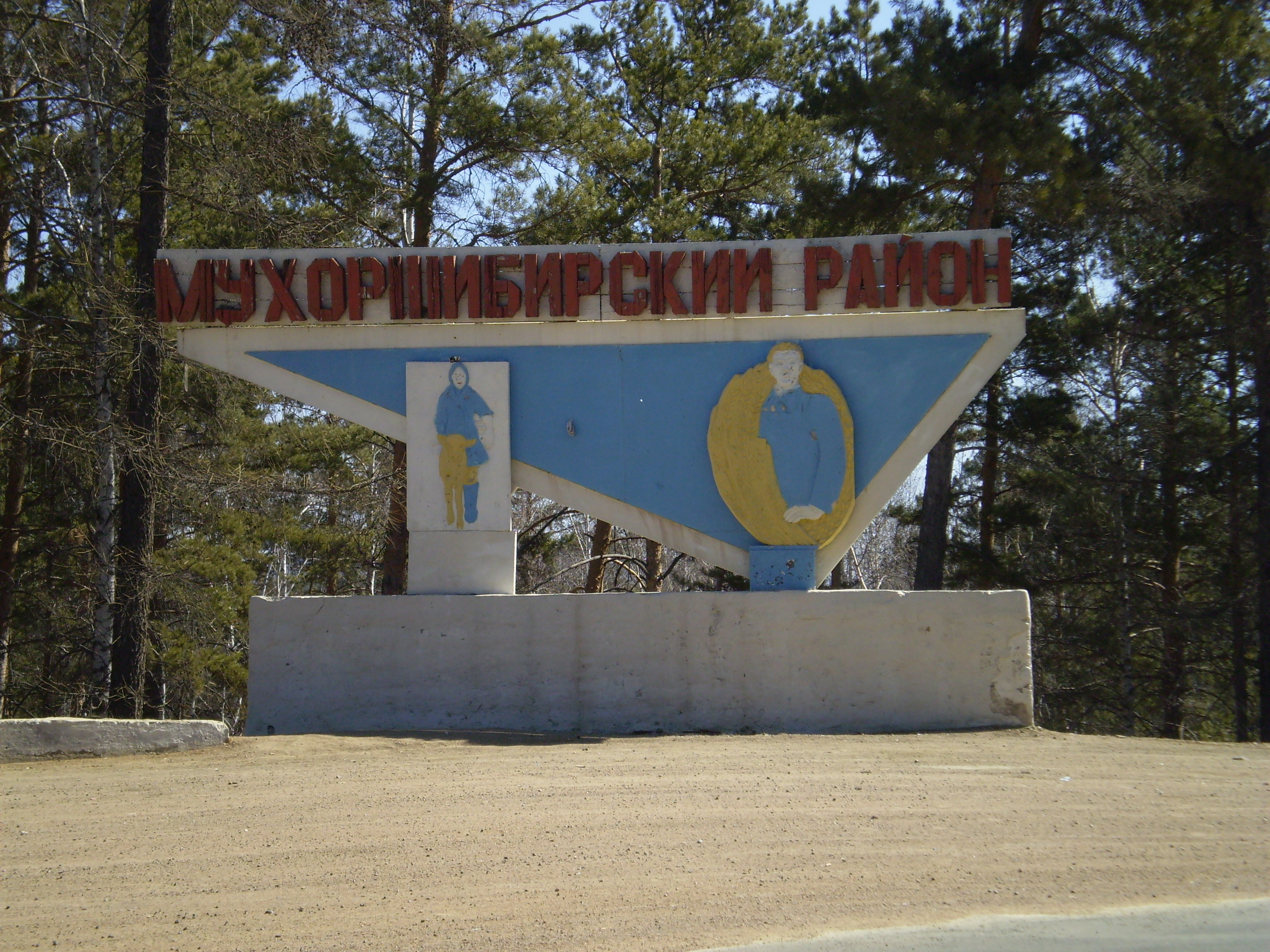
- Welcome sign at the border of Mukhorshibirsky District

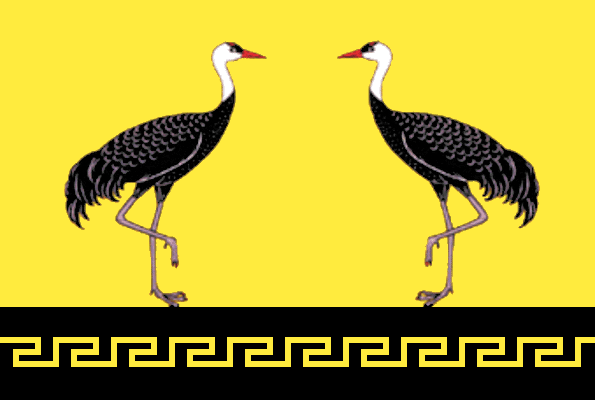
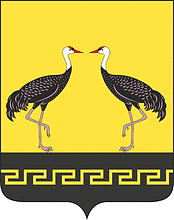
- Flag Coat of arms
- Location of Mukhorshibirsky District in the Buryat Republic
- Coordinates: 51°03′N 107°49′E
- Country: Russia
- Federal subject: Republic of Buryatia
- Established: September 26, 1927
- Administrative center: Mukhorshibir

Area
  - Total: 4,539 km^{2} (1,753 sq mi)

Population (2010 Census)
  - Total: 24,969
  - Density: 5.501/km^{2} (14.25/sq mi)
  - Urban: 0%
  - Rural: 100%

Administrative structure
  - Administrative divisions: 13 Selsoviets, 3 Somons
  - Inhabited localities: 29 rural localities

Municipal structure
  - Municipally incorporated as: Mukhorshibirsky Municipal District
  - Municipal divisions: 0 urban settlements, 16 rural settlements
- Time zone: UTC+8 (MSK+5)
- OKTMO ID: 81636000
- Website: http://мухоршибирский-район.рф

Population of Mukhorshibirsky District
- 2010 Census: 24,969
- 2002 Census: 28,634
- 1989 Census: 28,910
- 1979 Census: 26,433

Mukhorshibirsky District (Russian: Мухоршиби́рский райо́н; Buryat: Мухар Шэбэрэй аймаг, Mukhar Sheberei aimag) is an administrative and municipal district (raion), one of the twenty-one in the Republic of Buryatia, Russia. It is located in the center of the republic. The area of the district is 4,539 square kilometers (1,753 sq mi). Its administrative center is the rural locality (a selo) of Mukhorshibir. As of the 2010 Census, the total population of the district was 24,969, with the population of Mukhorshibir accounting for 20.9% of that number.

== History ==
The district was established on September 26, 1927 from the territory of Verkhneudinsky Uyezd.

== Administrative and municipal status ==
Within the framework of administrative divisions, Mukhorshibirsky District is one of the twenty-one in the Republic of Buryatia. The district is divided into thirteen selsoviets and three somons, which comprise twenty-nine rural localities. As a municipal division, the district is incorporated as Mukhorshibirsky Municipal District. Its thirteen selsoviets and three somons are incorporated as sixteen rural settlements within the municipal district. The selo of Mukhorshibir serves as the administrative center of both the administrative and municipal district.

== Gallery ==
Landscapes of Mukhorshibir district

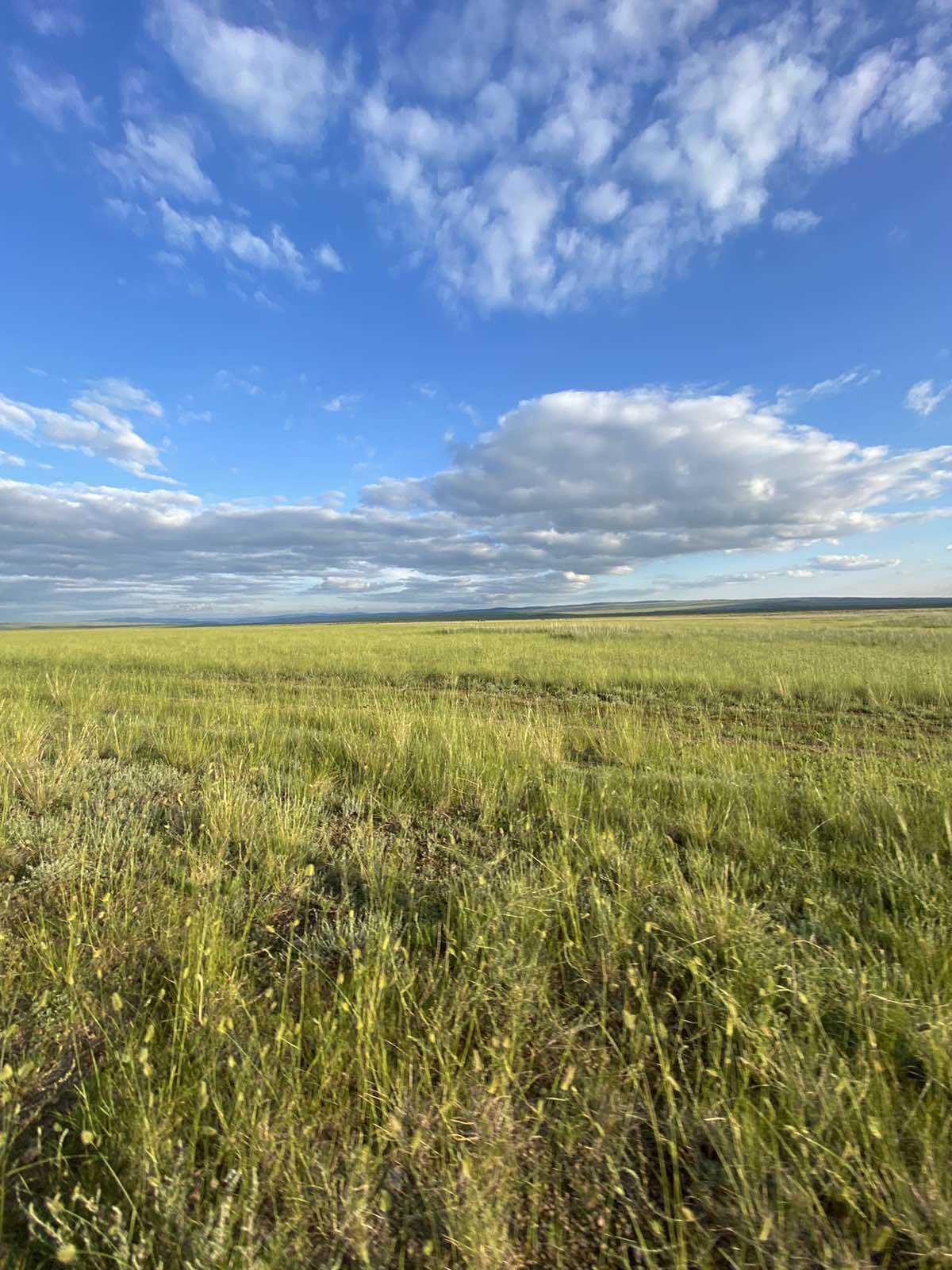

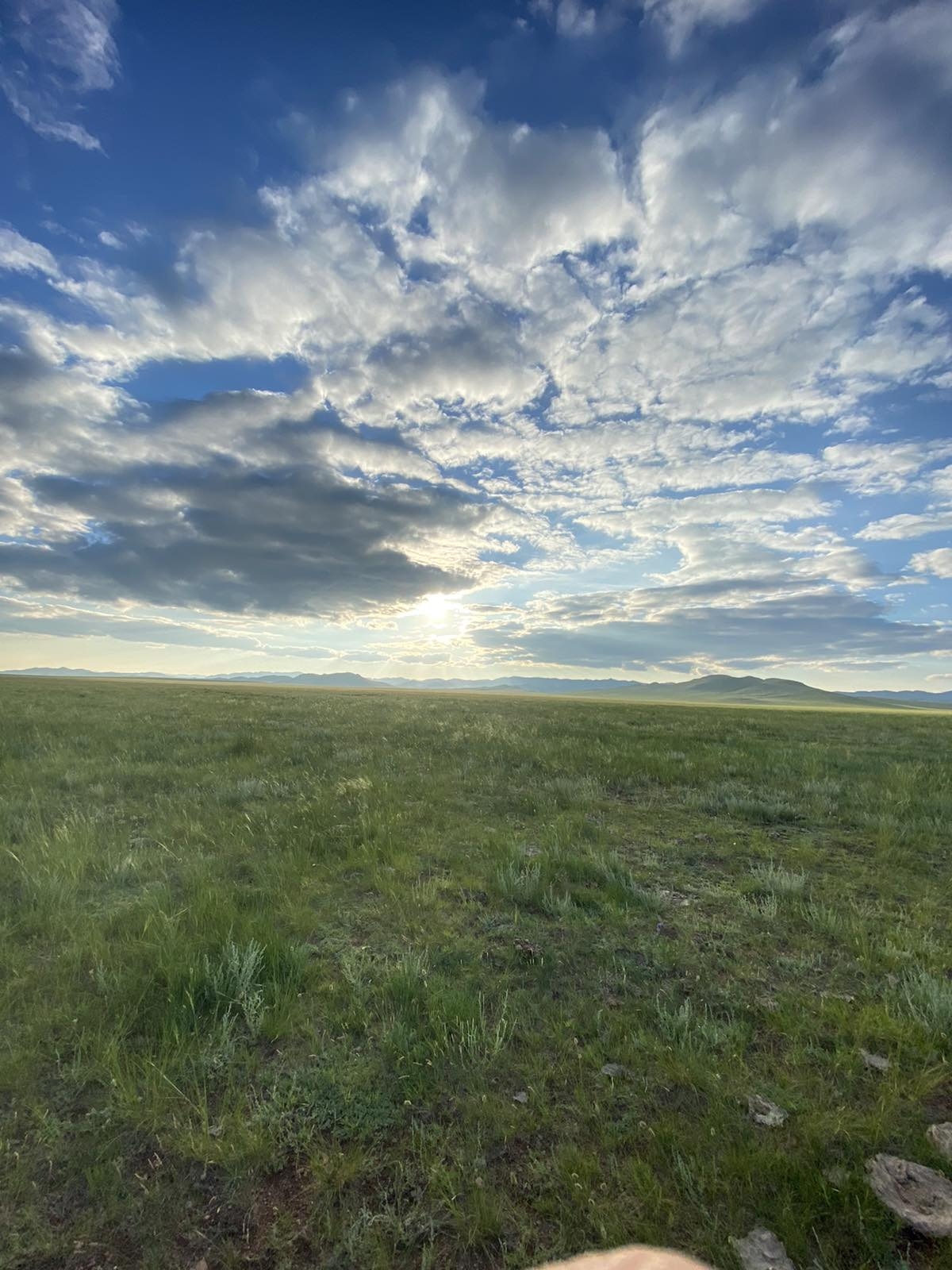

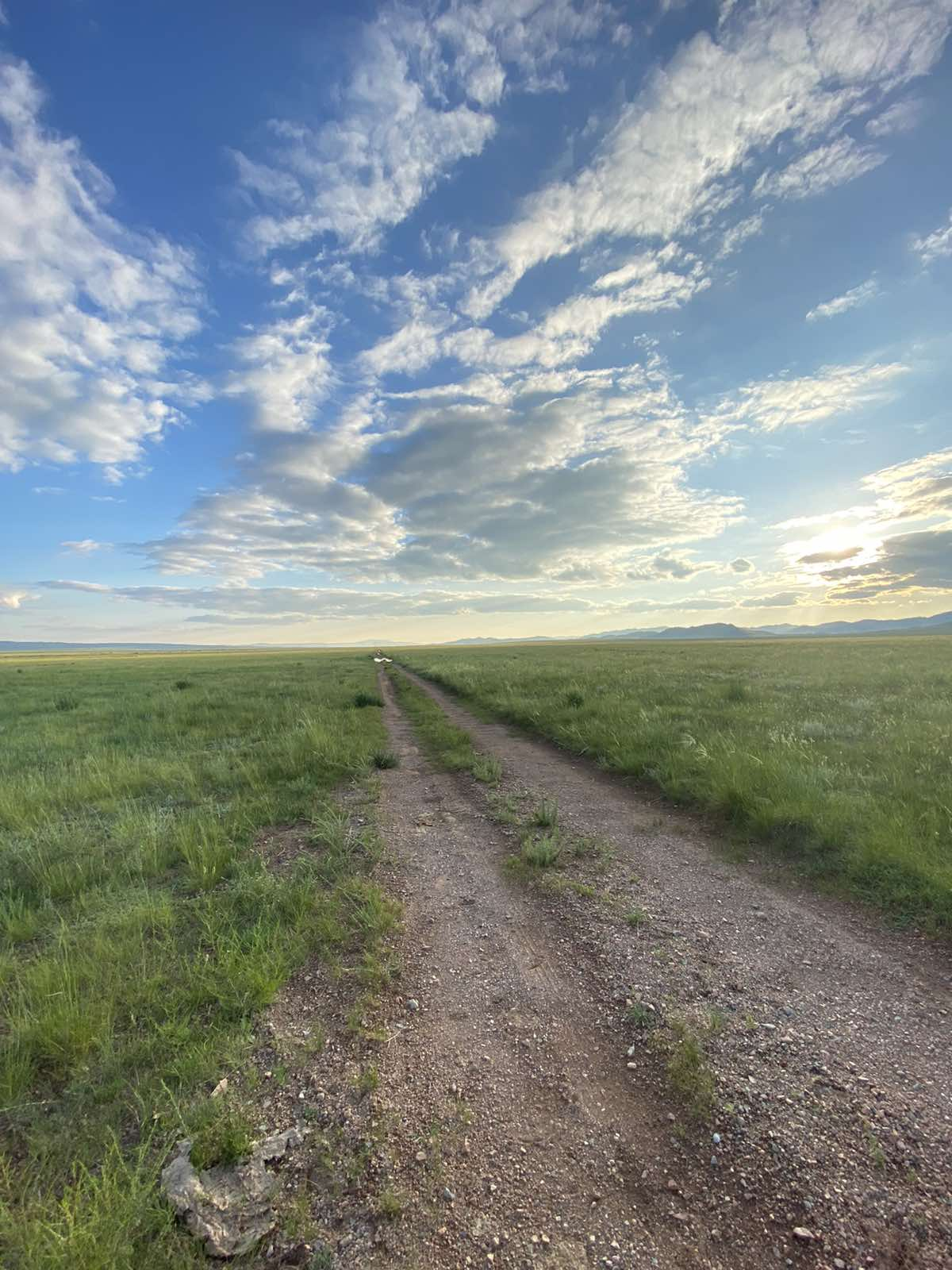
