= Masty =

Masty may refer to:

- Masty, Belarus, a city in Grodno Region, Belarus
- Masty District, a district (rajon) in Grodno Region, Belarus
- Masty (album), an album by Ali Zafar
- Masty, a village and part of Bílý Újezd in the Czech Republic
