= Vawkavysk Ghetto =

Ghetto in Nazi-occupied Belarus

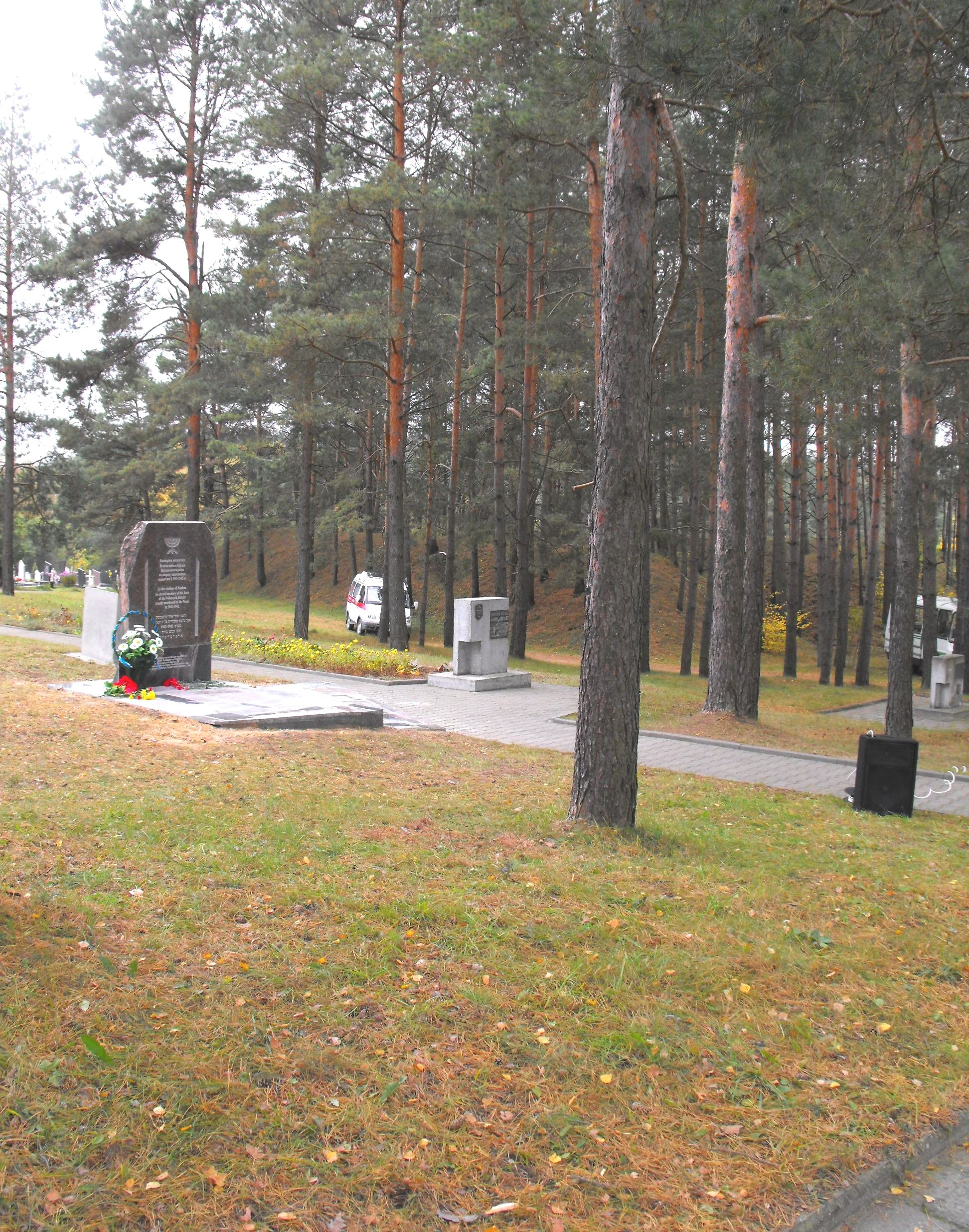
- Monument to the Vawkavysk Ghetto
- Location: Vawkavysk, Reichskommissariat Ostland; 53°10′N 24°28′E
- Date: mid-1941–2 November 1942; 2 November 1942–26 January 1943
- Incident type: Aerial bombing, imprisonment, mass shootings, forced labour
- Participants: Luftwaffe; Gestapo; Blue Police; Belarusian Auxiliary Police
- Victims: over 10,000

The Vawkavysk Ghetto (also known as the Wołkowysk Ghetto, Volkovysk Ghetto, or Vaŭkavysk Ghetto) was established in Vawkavysk, in what is now Belarus in the summer of 1941, lasting until January 1943. More than 10,000 people were killed in the ghetto.

== Establishment ==
Prior to the outbreak of World War II, Vawkavysk, then part of the Second Polish Republic, was home to 5,130 Jews. From the beginning of Operation Barbarossa on 22 June 1941 to 28 June, the city was bombed by the Luftwaffe, destroying the city's Jewish quarter and killing hundreds of Jews.

Antisemitic murders began instantly; the Jewish population (along with political commissars) was separated from others within the city's prisoner of war camp and executed upon the city's occupation by German forces. Mass arrests of Jewish citizens also began on the same day. On the fourth day of the occupation, the Germans raided houses, abducted two hundred Jews, and executed them.

Also immediately following the occupation of Vawkavysk, all Jews were required to wear yellow badges, sew stars of David to the front and back of their clothes, and draw yellow circles on their house doors. Jews were additionally forbidden to walk on the sidewalks or buy certain foods, such as meat. All healthy Jews were obliged to work in forced labour, at first clearing the rubble left by the city's bombing.

By the summer of 1941, the area which had once been the Jewish quarter had been transformed into a ghetto. A Judenrat in the city was established, consisting of ten people. Its head was Dr. Isaac Weinberg, and his deputy was Yakov Sedeletsky.

Jews who could not, or did not work at the beginning of the occupation could pay off their labour service for five Reichsmarks a day. This policy was used to determine the wealth of Jews within the ghetto. The ghetto was guarded at all times by German guards, as well as members of the Polish Blue Police, Belarusian Auxiliary Police, and Jewish Ghetto Police.

Before long, a state of famine descended upon the ghetto, which was exploited by German authorities. Jewish property was confiscated in exchange for food, and the Judenrat continued to carry the obligation to collect taxes, as well as periodically searching and confiscating ghetto property. Forced labour was used heavily, particularly in the construction of the Vawkavysk-Białystok highway.

A small resistance, led by Weinberg, existed within the ghetto, and had ties to the Belarusian partisans. After a partisan was wounded, Weinberg went to his assistance. After his resistance was revealed to the Germans by a traitor among the partisans, Weinberg, along with 11 other doctors and several engineers, was executed. He was replaced as head of the Judenrat by Noy Fogs.

== Creation of second ghetto and liquidation ==
=== Creation of second ghetto ===
On 31 October 1942, the population of the Vawkavysk Ghetto was ordered to hand over all excess clothing and footwear. The next day, it was announced that the ghetto's population would be evacuated, and the day after, an order by the Gestapo was published, stating, "All Jews of Vaŭkavysk – rich and poor, young and old, healthy and sick – must take with them a supply of food for two days and gather near their homes. All homes must be closed and keys given to the Gestapo. Anyone who disobeys will be shot on the spot." A handful did not flee, instead remaining in their homes. After another effort by Fogs to bring more people to line, those found by the Germans were executed. The surviving population left the ghetto and proceeded in a column towards the opposite end of Vawkavysk. The population of surrounding settlements was also relocated to the second ghetto, including Ruzhany, Zelva, Masty, and Mstibovo. The population was forced to live in a bunker complex.

=== Liquidation ===
In late November 1942, the ghetto's inhabitants were told that they would soon be sent to work in Germany. Not long after, around 5,000 ghetto inhabitants were taken to the railway station, along with 1,000 from Svislach, and herded into railway cars. By this time, the ghetto's liquidation was already under discussion. Fogs requested the liquidation's delay from January to November of 1943, but was refused.

The Germans ordered to leave no more than 1,700 Jewish men (none older than 50 years) and 100 women in the camp, with the rest being killed. Seven days later, following the compiling of a list, the Gestapo ordered the relocation of the ghetto's population into the empty bunkers. Panic resulted, ending in shots being fired into the crowd. Many, however, managed to bring their children in with them. One of those who made it on the list said "Parents and children, husbands and wives – all understood that this was the last separation. There was only one hour left. I sat down with my mother and four sisters. The youngest cried, 'Let me stay with you, I want to live.' My mother told me, 'Live and avenge our innocent blood!' The bunkers were filled with weeping and screaming. There was a very big noise, especially near the gate the picture was terrible. People fussed, rushing back and forth, looking for their children." Separating the people according to the list, the remaining Germans forced them out of the ghetto. A guard by the name of Zirka, accompanied by other soldiers, began to count the people in the bunkers. Some of the ghetto's inhabitants gave sleeping pills to their children, pushing them under the bunks, and the Germans did not notice them.

From 6–8 December 1942, trains of Jews departed from Vawkavysk, travelling to Auschwitz concentration camp and Treblinka extermination camp. Of the more than 10,000 people who had lived in the ghetto on 2 November 1942, now only 1,800 remained, in addition to surviving children and 60 other Jewish workers living within the city. The sanitary conditions of the bunkers which housed the surviving Jews were particularly dire; with medical care non-existent, epidemics of typhus and dysentery broke out among the inhabitants. The Germans quarantined the ill in a separate bunker until they perished, forbidding the healthy from entry, but this failed to stop the spread of disease. Within two months, approximately 1,000 people died, and by January 1943, only 800 people remained in the ghetto, of whom 30% had typhus. On 26 January 1943, 600 of the remaining ghetto prisoners were herded into trains and sent to Auschwitz concentration camp. Those left were slaughtered.

A terrible picture appeared before our eyes: a mountain of half-naked bodies with bloodied heads, broken arms and legs. These were the remains of those tortured to death during the last hour of the ghetto's evacuation. There were rags, crockery and various items on the floor. Everything was drenched in the blood of the victims. The air was filled with a smell of blood and sweat. An elderly, grey-haired woman rushed from one person to another, crying, "Why didn't they kill me too? Tell the Germans that I should also be shot!" In total, 80 people remained in the abandoned bunkers. They were ill, old people, and several children. They were left only because they could not move, and some managed to hide. The SS men herded them into Bunker 3 and kept them there for three days. Zirka ordered Jewish doctors to give people poison, but they flatly refused. Then, with the onset of twilight, a container with sulphur was placed in the bunker and the doors with windows were tightly closed. Two days later, the bunker was opened. The bodies lay in unnatural positions with their eyes open, and yet several people were still breathing - all of whom were executed.

— Doctor Kaplinsky, among the first to inspect the bunkers following the ghetto's liquidation,
