= Vawkavysk =

Town in Grodno Region, Belarus

Vawkavysk Ваўкавыск (Belarusian) Волковыск (Russian) Wołkowysk
- Town
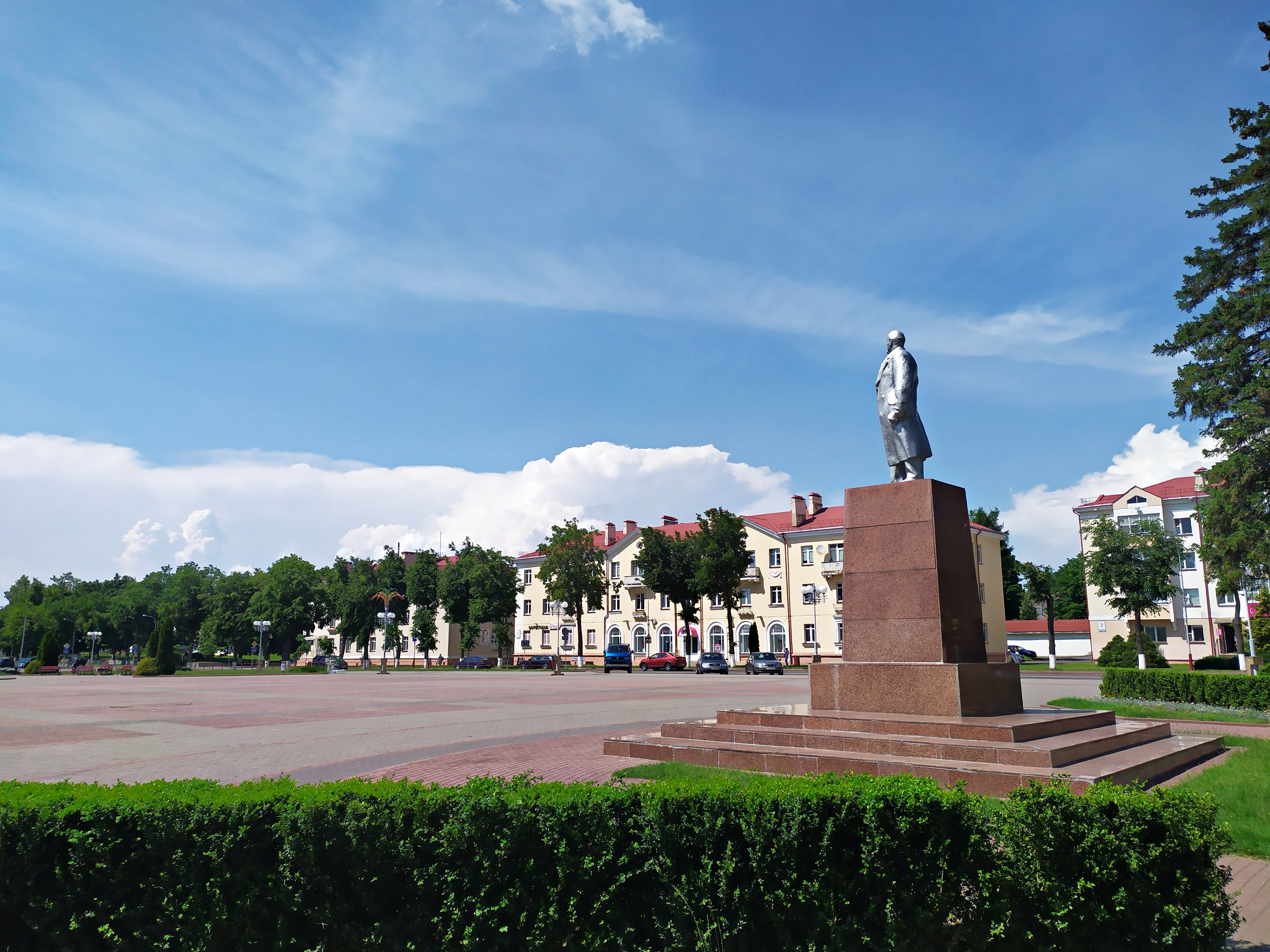
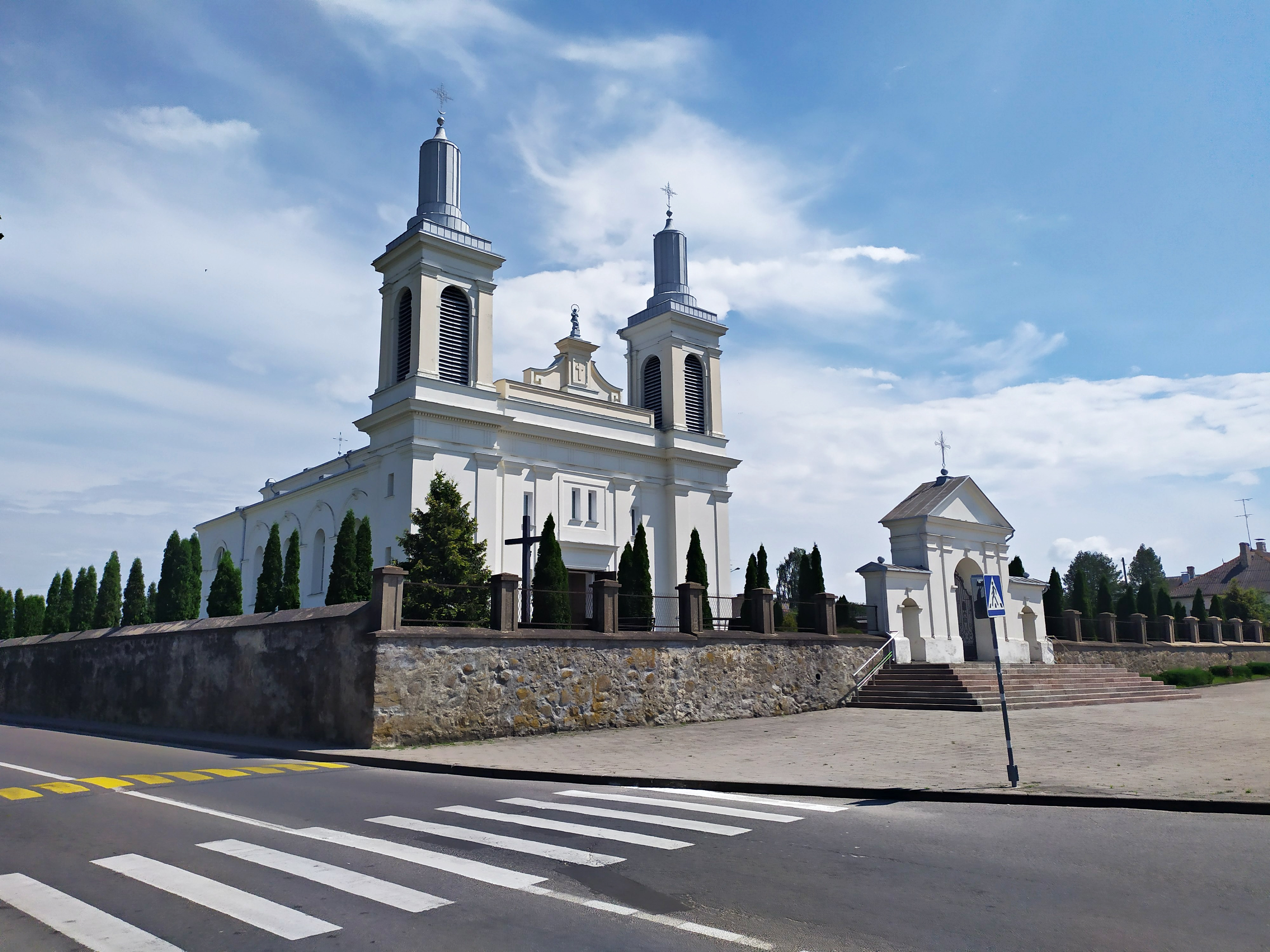
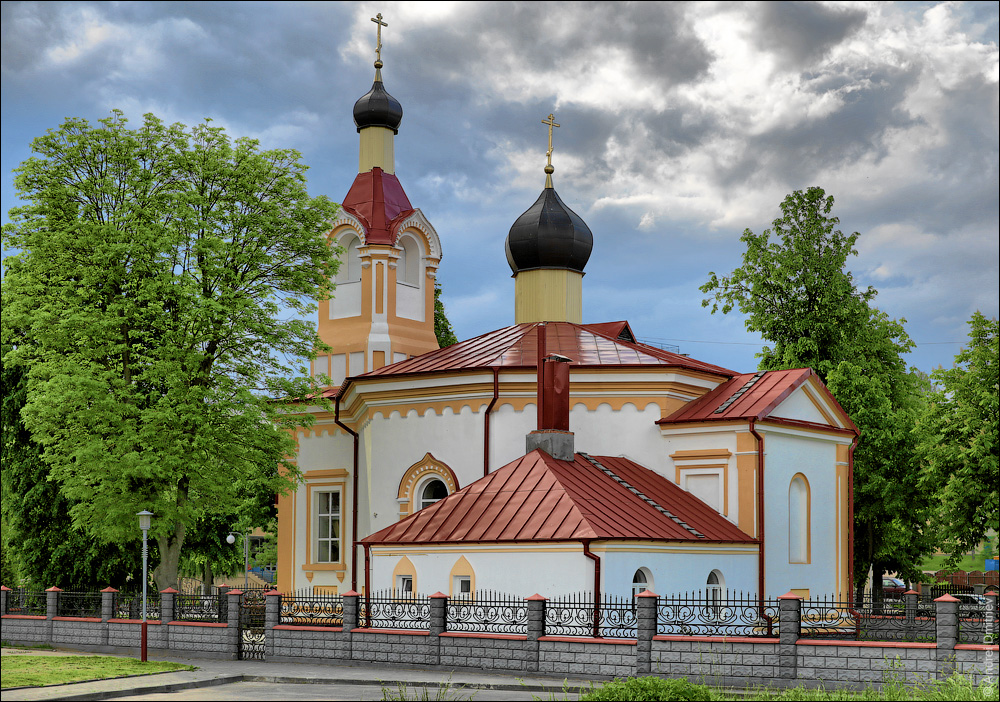
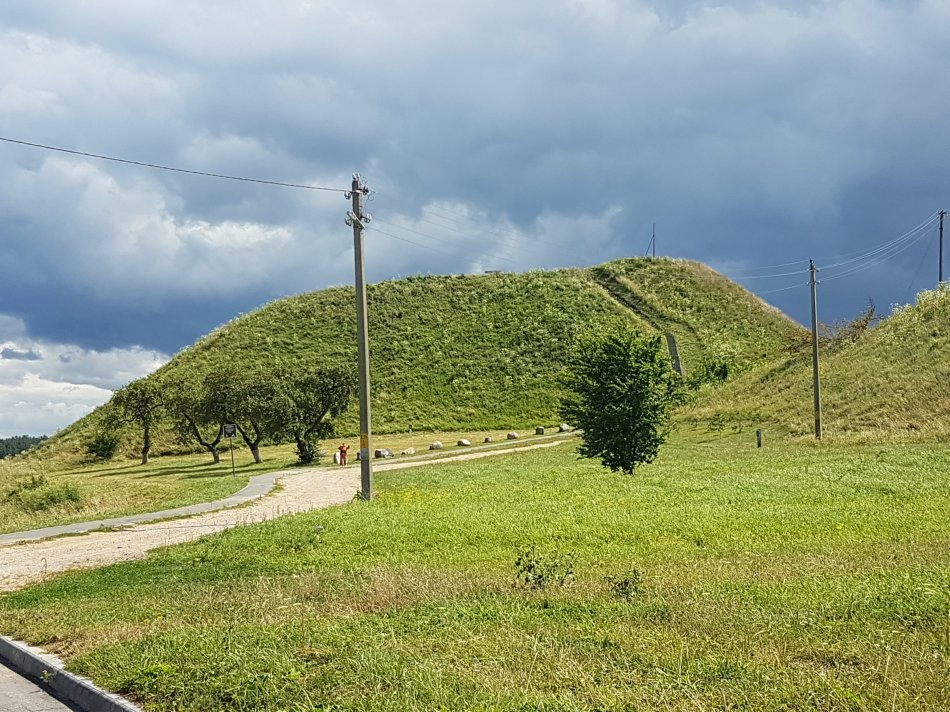
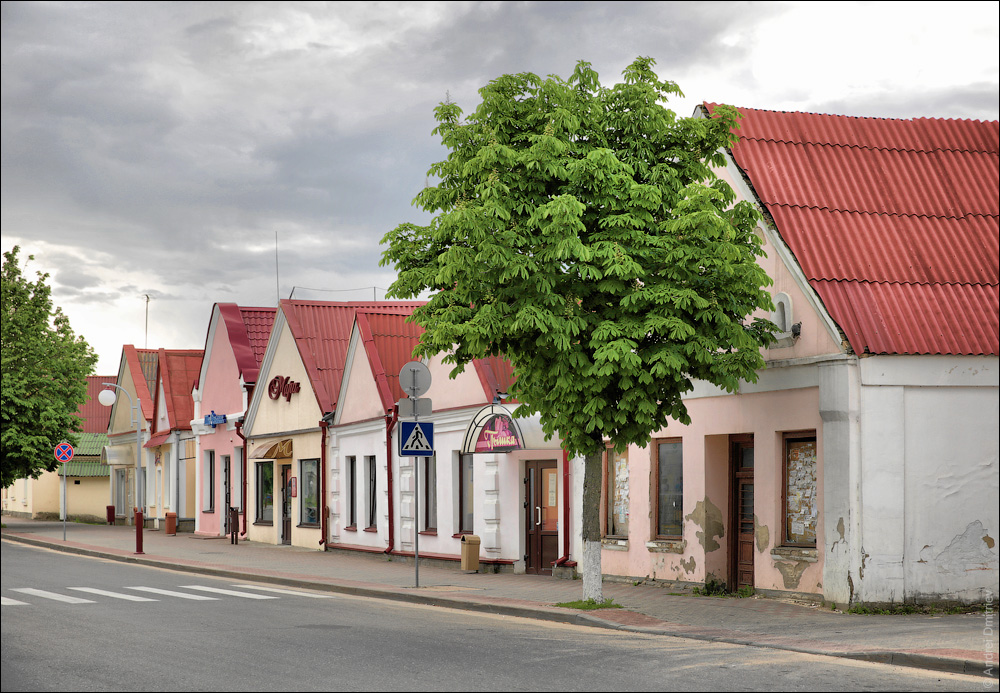
- Central Square with a statue of Vladimir Lenin St. Wenceslaus Catholic Church Saint Nicholas Orthodox Church Castle Mound Old buildings in central Vawkavysk

- Flag Coat of arms

- Location within Belarus
- Coordinates: 53°10′N 24°28′E
- Country: Belarus
- Region: Grodno Region
- District: Vawkavysk District
- Founded: 1005

Government
  - Chairman of the Executive Committee: Mikhail Sitko

Area
  - Total: 29 km^{2} (11 sq mi)
- Elevation: 161 m (528 ft)

Population (2025)
  - Total: 41,020
  - Density: 1,400/km^{2} (3,700/sq mi)
- Time zone: UTC+3 (MSK)
  - Summer (DST): N/A
- Postal code: 231900
- Area code: (+375) 1512
- Car plates: 4
- Website: volkovysk.grodno-region.by

Vawkavysk or Volkovysk (Note: Belarusian: Ваўкавы́ск, romanized: Vaŭkavysk; Russian: Волковы́ск; Polish: Wołkowysk; Yiddish: וואַלקעוויסק.) is a town in Grodno Region, in western Belarus. It serves as the administrative center of Vawkavysk District. It is located on the Ros and Vawkawyya rivers, roughly 98 kilometres (61 mi) from the city of Grodno and 271 kilometres (168 mi) from Minsk, the national capital. As of 2025, it has a population of 41,020. It is one of the oldest towns in the region.

Vawkavysk was first unofficially mentioned in the Turov annals in 1005 and this year is widely accepted as the founding year for Vawkavysk. At that time it was a city-fortress on the border of the Baltic and the Slavic ethnic groups. Since the 12th century, Vawkavysk was the center of a small princedom. The Hypatian Chronicle mentions the city in 1252.

== Toponymy ==
Vawkavysk was mentioned in a manuscript written by the priest D. Bułakowski at the end of the 16th or beginning of the 17th century. It was stored in the Sapieha family's library in Ruzhany Palace, where it was translated into Russian in 1881 and published in a Vilnius gazette. According to the legend recorded in the manuscript, in the place where Vawkavysk is now situated, were large swathes of forest, where travelers were frequently attacked. Within this forest, two robbers, named Woloko and Wisek, had their hide-out. A certain prince named Watislaw Zawejko, upon hearing of these attacks, tracked down the robbers and hung them on trees for the birds to feed upon. He built a settlement for his serfs in the location of the robbers' hide-out, which was named Wolokowysek. At the execution site, a large stone was placed but, according to local tradition, was later broken up to be used to build a temple.

Another suggestion that it was named after the Vawkawyya river, the name of unclear etymology.

== Geography ==
Map of Vawkavysk District within Grodno Region

Vawkavysk is located in the valley basin of the Wołkowyja River near its confluence with the Ros River, which flows, in turn, directly north about 25 kilometres (16 mi) to the Neman River. The historical core of Vawkavysk lies on the left bank of the river. The town has been expanding to the west and south. The town has an urban area of 79 square kilometres (31 sq mi), while together with its metropolitan area it covers 1,192 km^{2} (460 sq mi).

On the left bank of the Wołkowyja River, the town is surrounded on three sides by hilly terrain, while the highest point of Vawkavysk is Shvedskaya Gora ('Swedish Mountain'), located on the southeastern outskirts of town, with its height from the base to the top of its defensive wall varying from 28 to 32.5 metres (92 to 107 ft). The mountain's base is round with a diameter of about 350 metres (1,150 ft). The flat top of "the Swedish mountain" is nearly round and is 55 metres (180 ft) wide east to west. The perimeter of the flat top is surrounded by a powerful defensive wall broken in the south by the entrance. The mountains of Zamchishche ('Castle Mountain') and Muravelnik ('Mouse Mountain') lie to the west and east of Swedish Mountain, respectively.

=== Climate ===
Vawkavysk lies in the warm summer continental or hemiboreal (Dfb) climate zone, with four seasons and uniformly spread precipitation. Monthly averages range from -5.0 °C (23 °F) in January to 17.9 °C (64.2 °F) in July. On average, there are 95 days a year when there is snow cover. Vawkavysk receives about 632 millimetres (24.9 in) of precipitation a year. The average period of vegetation is 194 days, and it lasts from April to October. The highest officially recorded temperature in Vawkavysk was 36 °C (96.8 °F) in 1959, while on the other end, the lowest temperature was -38 °C (-36.4 °F) in 1950.

== History ==
=== Prehistory ===
Historical affiliations

Kievan Rus prior to 1084
Baltic tribes 1084-1239
Duchy of Lithuania 1239–1254
Golden Horde 1254–1269
∟ Kingdom of Galicia–Volhynia 1254–1269
Grand Duchy of Lithuania 1269–1289
Golden Horde 1289–1293
∟ Kingdom of Galicia–Volhynia 1289–1293
Grand Duchy of Lithuania 1293–1569
Polish–Lithuanian Commonwealth 1569–1795
Russian Empire 1795–1918
Belarusian People's Republic 1918–1919
Second Polish Republic 1919–1939
Soviet Union 1939–1941 (occupation)
∟ Byelorussian SSR 1939–1941
Nazi Germany 1941–1944 (occupation)
Soviet Union 1944–1991
∟ Byelorussian SSR 1944–1991
Republic of Belarus 1991–present

Prior to the 10th century, there were three fortified settlements on the territory of Vawkavysk. Swedish Mountain, along with Muravelnik, and Zamchishcha are considered the territories of current Vawkavysk. Swedish Mountain is a remnant of one of these fortifications. Gradually, as the settlement grew, the boundaries of the town extended to the neighboring hill of Zamchishcha. Industrial and commercial sites were located at the foot of Swedish Mountain along its northern, eastern, and southern sides. Muravelnik was also inhabited, but was not as populated as Swedish Mountain and Zamchishcha. Due to flooding of the Wołkowyja River, there are no other known archaeological sites.

=== Middle Ages ===
Vawkavysk is one of the oldest towns in Eastern Europe and has played a role in the political development of medieval Slavic civilization. It is believed that Vawkavysk was founded in the 10th century. The origin of the town is developed by legends, one of which tells about a certain prince Wadislaw Zawejko, who in 738 found robbers named Woloko and Wisek and killed them. In the place of their shelter, 10 huts were built, which expanded into a settlement. According to the legend, the name Vawkavysk is derived from the names of the two robbers. Another legend states that the town was founded by the King of Lithuania, Mindaugas.

There is little historical evidence pertaining to the period when the town was founded. Archaeological excavations conducted at the site of the ancient town attest that a Slavic settlement had already existed in the area by the late 10th century, based on the dwellings and defensive works which were discovered during the excavation.

Vawkavysk lies in a region formerly referred to as Black Ruthenia that was subjugated to various invading forces from Baltic and Slavic tribes. At various times, the town was influenced by the Principality of Polotsk and Galicia-Volhynia. On the nights of 15 and 16 February 1038, the town was destroyed by a Baltic tribe of Yatvingians. Up until 1084, this territory belonged to Slavic Kievan Rus and later became a dependent vassal state. After Mindaugas conquered the area in 1239, it was incorporated into what would later become the Grand Duchy of Lithuania and was administered from Navahrudak from the 1240s to the 1250s.

Vawkavysk's location on the border between Lithuania and neighboring Galicia-Volhynia resulted in frequent fighting over these territories. The Ipatiev Chronicle mentions Vawkavysk in connection with an invasion of the Galicia-Volhynian prince Daniel Romanovich Galitsky and his brother Vasilko in 1252. Power exchanged periodically during the years of 1254-1258 between the princes of these two kingdoms. The chronicle continues with describing that a peace treaty was signed in 1254 where the Grand Duke of Lithuania, Vaišvilkas, transferred Vawkavysk, along with several other towns, to Daniel's son, Roman Danylovich Galitsky. Sometime after this event, in 1255, a prince named Gleb, who acknowledged himself as a vassal of the Grand Duke of Lithuania, became the ruler of Vawkavysk. Prince Gleb participated in a Galicia-Volhynian campaign against the Yatvingians in 1256.

It was not until 1258, after several years of war, that Vawkavysk and Slonim settled as vassal states of Lithuania with Vaišvilkas again reigning from Navahrudak as a vassal of Mindaugas. In 1260, Vaišvilkas and another Lithuanian prince, Toth, captured and killed Roman, which resulted in Daniel marching to the upper reaches of the Neman River to recapture Vawkavysk and take Gleb as prisoner. The chronicle fails to explain what ended this particular campaign. Meanwhile, in 1263, Mindaugas of Lithuania was murdered. In the chaos that followed Mindaugas' assassination, the lands of the Grand Duchy were in disarray, with both local and foreign rulers struggling for power. Additionally, in 1264, Daniel died and his son Svarn Danylovich Galitsky received nominal overlordship over all of the Kingdom of Galicia–Volhynia as its duke, including Vawkavysk. Ownership of the town in 1269 belonged to prince Vladimir.

Following Svarn's loss of the throne in 1269, his brother Lev I of Galicia entered into conflict with Lithuania. In 1274–1276 he fought a war with the new Lithuanian ruler Traidenis but was defeated, and Lithuania annexed the territory of Black Ruthenia with its city of Navahrudak.

During a campaign against the Lithuanians in 1277, the Rus army and their princes, Mstislav Danylovich, another son of Daniel; Vladimir Vasilkovich; and Yuri Lvovich, stopped for the night in Vawkavysk. The last time Vawkavysk is mentioned in the Ipatiev Chronicle is when Lithuanian Grand Duke Butigeidis transferred Vawkavysk to prince Mstislav Danylovich in exchange for peace in 1289.

=== Grand Duchy of Lithuania ===
Vawkavysk came under the rule of Grand Duke Vytenis and became part of the Grand Duchy of Lithuania in 1293.

It was from a now non-existent castle in Vawkavysk that, in 1385, Jogaila sent his envoys to Kraków to ask for the hand of the Queen of Poland, Jadwiga. He declared that he along with the Lithuanian people was to adopt the Catholic faith, and received the Polish envoys after a long-awaited decision on 11 January 1386. In 1386 Jogaila was baptized as Władysław II Jagiełło in Kraków and became King of Poland. Jagiełło, while in Vawkavysk in 1387, ordered the destruction of pagan deities.

In 1409 the town was attacked and plundered by the Teutonic Knights under the command of Grand Master Ulrich von Jungingen and its residents taken captive. On 16 March 1410, the town was seized again and burnt under the command of Marshal Frederic von Wallenrode and its residents were murdered. On 15 July 1410, the Vawkavysk banner participated in the Battle of Grunwald against the Teutonic Order. In 1430 the church of St. Nicholas was built. Vawkavysk was included in the composition of the Grand Duchy of Lithuania in 1441 after being under its authority since 1258.

In 1503 Vawkavysk was granted Magdeburg city rights by Polish king Alexander Jagiellon. These rights were confirmed by different kings up to 1773. The town received its personal coat of arms of a wolf's head on a blue background. In 1507, Vawkavysk became part of the Nowogródek Voivodeship and was capital of Wołkowysk powiat until 1795. By 1513, Vawkavysk had 9 streets. A church was mentioned as having existed since 1536, while a monastery of Jesuits was founded in 1598. From 1566, Vawkavysk was also a venue for General Sejmiks, which provincial delegates and senators attended, that were held for the whole of Lithuania.

=== Polish–Lithuanian Commonwealth ===
The Union of Lublin was signed July 1, 1569, in Lublin, Poland, and created a single state, the Polish–Lithuanian Commonwealth. It replaced the personal union of the Crown of the Kingdom of Poland and the Grand Duchy of Lithuania with a real union and an elective monarchy, since Sigismund II Augustus, the last of the Jagiellons, remained childless after three marriages. Subsequent to this, Vawkavysk became a royal town within the Commonwealth.

The 17th century was a very difficult time in the history of Vawkavysk, in particular, and the Polish-Lithuanian Commonwealth in general. The region became the scene of many wars. It was during this time that the Polish-Lithuanian Commonwealth entered into a series of mid-17th century campaigns, known as The Deluge, consisting of uprisings, invasions and Northern Wars with Russia and Sweden. Following the popular uprising led by Bohdan Khmelnytsky in Ukraine, the rebellion brought into focus the rivalry between Russia and the Commonwealth for hegemony over Ukraine and over the eastern Slavic lands in general. In October 1653 the Russian zemsky sobor declared war on the Commonwealth and in June 1654, the forces of Tsar Alexis of Russia invaded the eastern half of Poland-Lithuania, starting the Russo-Polish War of 1654-67. During this time, Vawkavysk was captured twice by Russian troops in 1655 and 1662 and left heavily damaged.

At the same time, the Swedish Empire, which technically already was in conflict, although with a cease-fire agreement, with the Commonwealth from the Polish-Swedish War of 1626-29, invaded in July 1654 and occupied the remaining half of the country. In 1656, after three days of battle, Vawkavysk was destroyed and burned by the army of King Charles X Gustav of Sweden. The administrative center of the town was a castle on the river near the road to Izabelin, which was destroyed alongside the town.

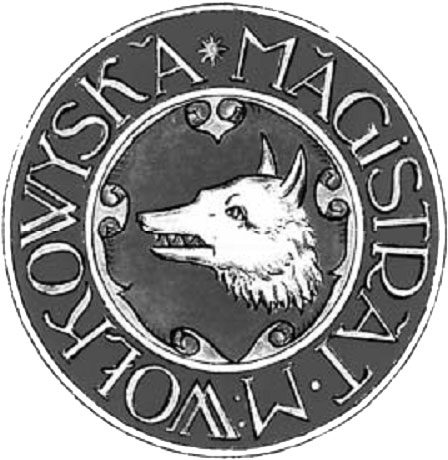
Municipal seal from the 18th century

During the Great Northern War in 1706, the Swedes attacked Vawkavysk again, which resulted in the residents demanding large indemnity.

In 1736, a Jesuit mission was formed at the expense of a E. Linovskiy, as well as a school in 1747. By the second half of the 18th century, several Jesuit and Marianite monasteries operated in Vawkavysk. As of 1792, the town had about 1,000 buildings, and a church in which the Uniates used as well.

=== Russian Empire ===
Vawkavysk eventually became a part of the Russian Empire in 1795, following the third partition of Poland. It was placed under the administration of the Slonim Governorate as a province and in 1802 became the capital of its own district within the Lithuania-Grodno Governorate.

During the French invasion of Russia in 1812, Vawkavysk housed the headquarters of General Pyotr Bagration, commander of the 2nd Russian Army. From 17 June to 15 November [O.S. 3 November] 1812, the town housed Napoleon's army. On 14–16 November [O.S. 2–4 November] 1812, during a battle between the French and Russian forces, Vawkavysk was burned (see Battle of Wolkowisk). Russian General Fabian Gottlieb von Osten-Sacken defeated the VII Saxon Corps of French General Jean Reynier. The Congress of Vienna in 1815 confirmed Vawkavysk's belonging to Russia.

In 1844, Vawkavysk had a wooden church and another church, a parish school, two hospitals, and a pharmacy. In 1845, the town received new Russian coat of arms. As of 1860, Vawkavysk had four hundred ninety-two homes, two schools, St. Wenceslas church, seven Jewish prayer houses, a synagogue, a brick factory, two mills, a hospital, and fifty-eight shops.

In 1863, a company from Vawkavysk under the command of Gustaw Strawiński took part in the January Uprising.

In 1885, the town began construction of what would become an important railway junction between Baranovichi and Białystok. The railway station was opened in 1886.

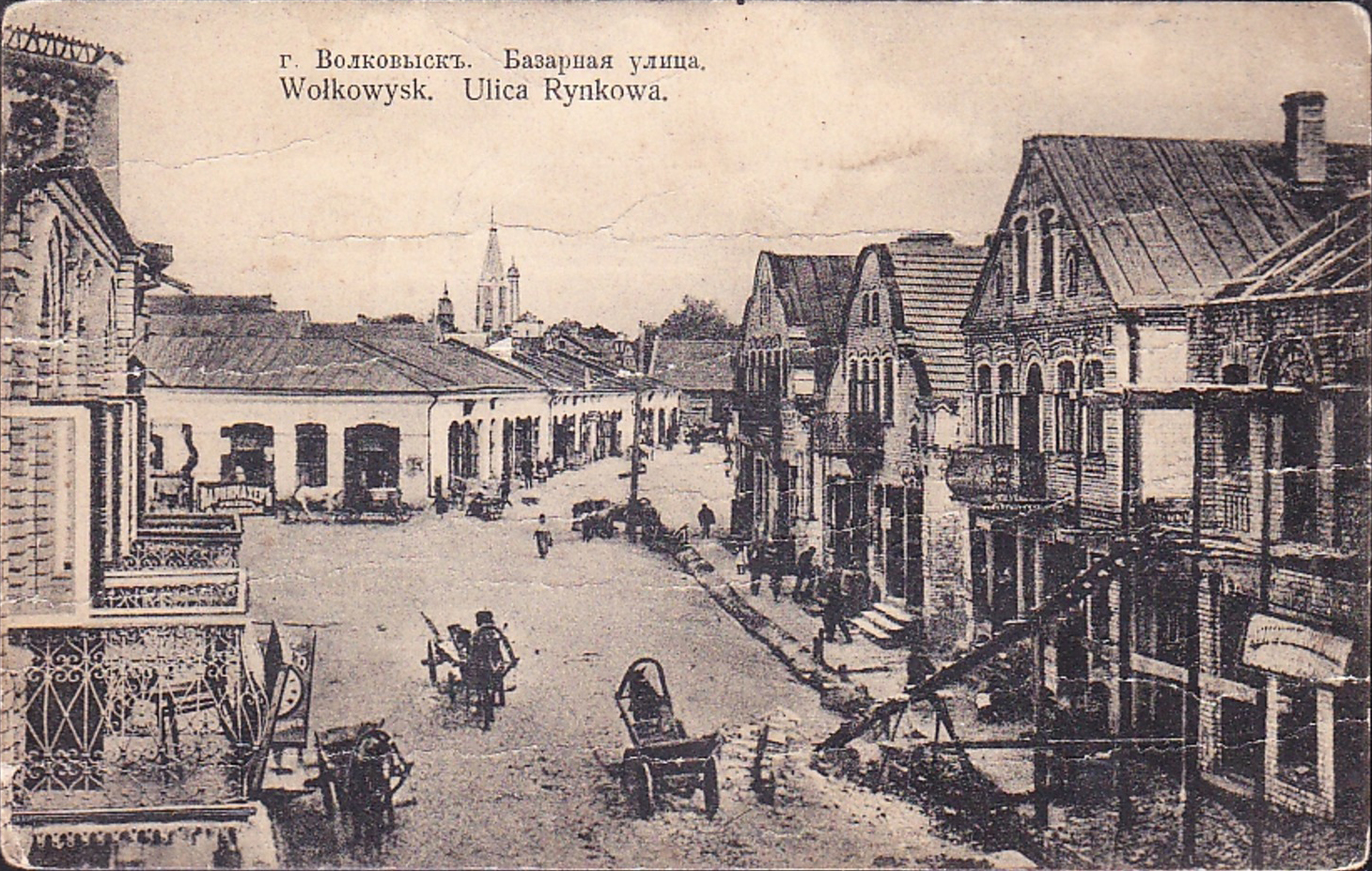
Early 20th-century view

By 1891, Vawkavysk had 19 industrial enterprises. In 1906, the town began construction of a railway line to Siedlce; once construction was completed in 1907, the town became an important railway junction.

=== World War I and the Interbellum ===
During the First World War, Vawkavysk was the headquarters of the commander-in-chief of the North-Western Front. In the autumn of 1915, the town was occupied by German troops. Following the collapse of Imperial Russia in 1917, the subsequent emergence of the new Bolshevik government of the Russian Soviet Federative Socialist Republic, and the signing of the armistice between Russia and the Central Powers, Vawkavysk and the surrounding area temporarily laid within Russian territory. The signing of the Treaty of Brest-Litovsk on 3 March 1918, between Russia and the Central Powers (Germany, Austria-Hungary, Bulgaria, and Turkey) ended Russia's participation in World War I. In this peace treaty, Russia renounced all territorial claims in Finland (which it had already acknowledged), the future Baltic states (Estonia, Latvia and Lithuania), Belarus, and Ukraine. During the negotiations of the Treaty of Brest-Litovsk, Belarus first declared independence under German occupation on 25 March 1918, forming the Belarusian People's Republic.

==== Polish–Soviet War ====
By 1919 Bolsheviks took control over Belarus and forced the country's democratic government into exile. Immediately afterwards, the Polish–Soviet War ignited, and the territory of Belarus was divided between Poland and Soviet Russia. On 8 February 1919 Vawkavysk was occupied by Polish troops. The town was then captured by the 16th Bolshevik Army on 24 July 1920 and subsequently recaptured on 27 September 1920 by the 3rd Legions Infantry Division under the command of General Leon Berbecki.

==== Second Polish Republic ====
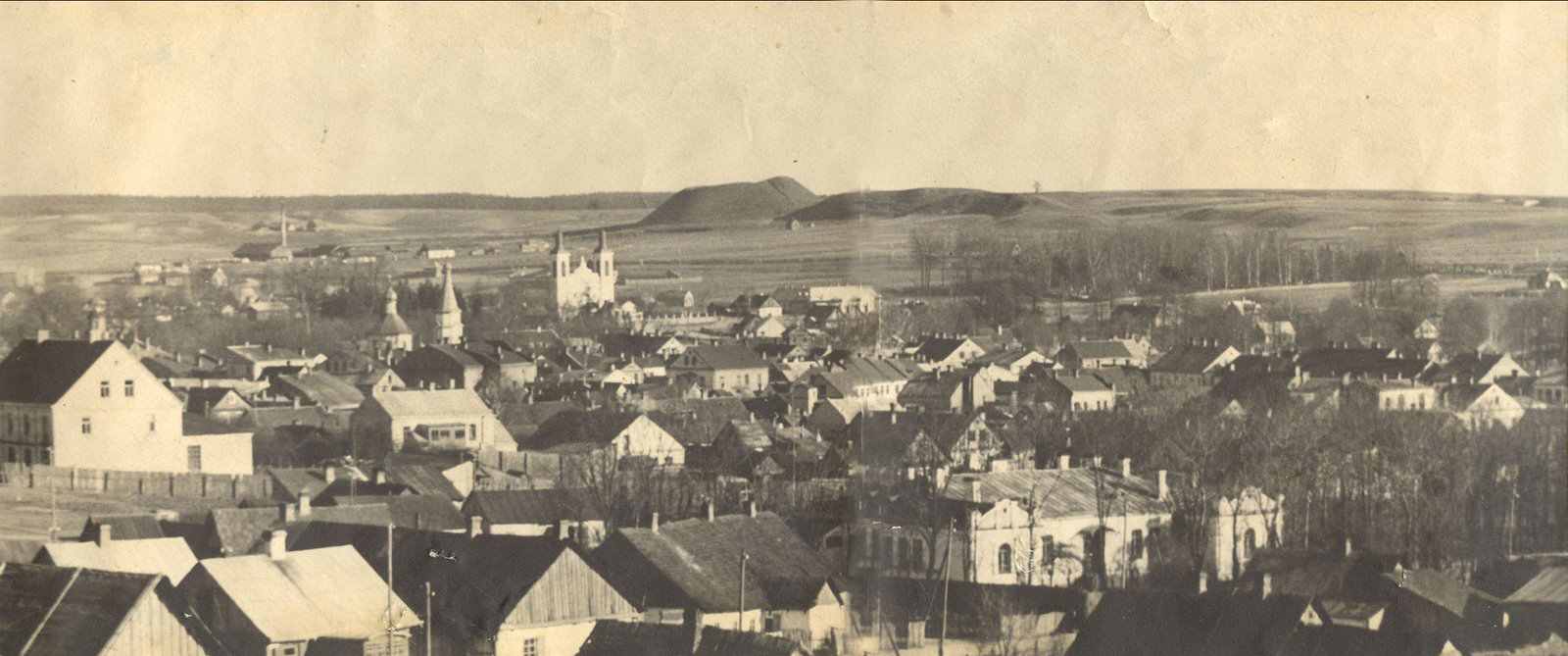
Wołkowysk in the 1930s

The Treaty of Riga was signed in Riga on 18 March 1921, between Poland, Soviet Russia (acting also on behalf of Soviet Belarus) and Soviet Ukraine. The treaty ended the Polish–Soviet War. Afterwards, the city remained part of the interwar Second Polish Republic, and was the seat of the Wołkowysk County in the Białystok Voivodeship and the seat of gmina Biskupice.

=== World War II ===
Upon the invasion of Poland by Nazi Germany and the Soviet Union, the Wołkowysk Reserve Cavalry Brigade was formed. Wołkowysk came under Soviet occupation on 18 September 1939 as a result of the German–Soviet Treaty of Friendship, Cooperation and Demarcation. On 2 November 1939, Vawkavysk, along with the rest of Western Belarus, was annexed by the Soviet Union. On November 14, 1939, it was included into the Byelorussian Soviet Socialist Republic. Vawkavysk became the regional capital of the Belastok Region within the Byelorussian SSR on 15 January 1940. The town was a point of detention and deportation of German and Polish prisoners of war, including prisoner-of-war camp 281 by the Red Army until 1941.

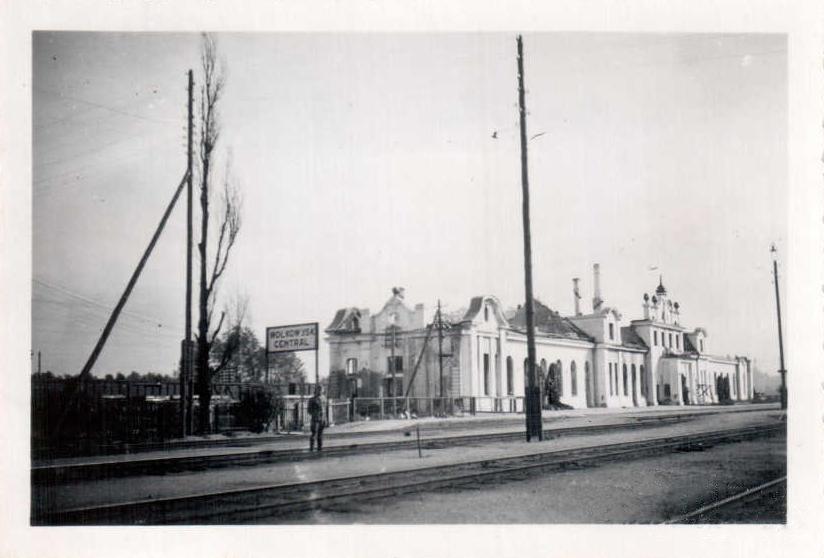
Railway station in 1941

Vawkavysk was occupied by the German Army on 28 June 1941. At that time, about 7,000 Jews lived in the town, around 40 percent of the population. Around 1,000 people, mostly but not entirely Jews, were killed in the Luftwaffe bombardment of the town. Upon arrival, the Germans, with some assistance by local Poles and Belarusians, murdered several dozen Jews within the first week; another 200 were murdered in mid July, mostly business and professional men along with those who had handicaps. That summer, the Germans established a Jewish ghetto. The ghetto became a transit ghetto for Jews of Kreis Wolkowysk. About 20,000 Jews passed through it; most were sent on to Treblinka In December 1942, part of the transit camp was converted to a closed ghetto for about 2,000 Jews, mostly essential male workers who were allowed to leave each day to go to the work sites. In January 1943, the final group of ghetto dwellers was sent to Auschwitz where most were murdered immediately. About 70 Jews of the original 7,000 Jewish residents survived the war. Some of the survivors had fled to the Soviet Union at the beginning of the war; others fought in the forests as partisans and a few survived Auschwitz.

During the Belostok Offensive, on 14 July 1944, the 2nd Belarusian Front of the Red Army was able to recapture the town. The town became the regional center of Grodno Region in the BSSR on 20 September 1944.

=== After World War II ===
Following the conclusion of the European front of World War II in 1945, Vawkavysk came under the authority of the Belarusian Soviet Socialist Republic until the collapse of the Soviet Union in 1991. Since 1991, Vawkavysk has belonged to the Republic of Belarus.

== Administration ==
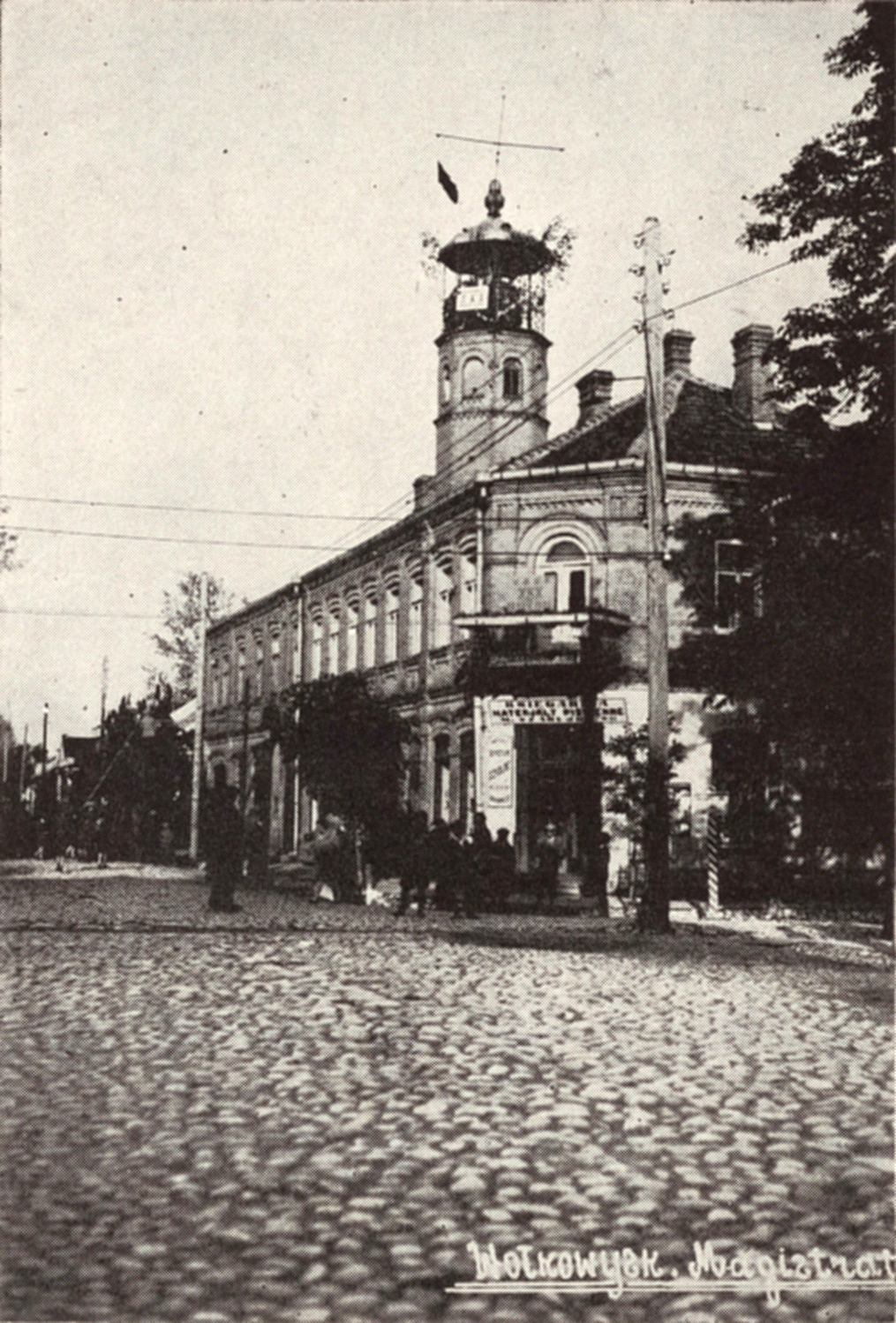
Town hall in the interbellum

Local issues are represented by the locally elected Councils of Deputies. These local councils operate on three levels: primary (villages and towns), basic (towns and regional councils), and regional (oblast) (Regional Council of Deputies). Deputies are elected for four-year terms to deal with local issues and represent the local population in decisions on issues relating to health, education, social welfare, trade, and transport. Local Councils of Deputies make decisions on local issues within the framework of national legislation.

== Demographics ==
Historical population
Year	Pop.	±%
1840	2,992	—
1849	2,267	−24.2%
1860	3,472	+53.2%
1889	7,071	+103.7%
1891	8,057	+13.9%
1897	10,323	+28.1%
1907/8	11,200	+8.5%
1921	11,100	−0.9%
1931	15,000	+35.1%
1939	16,700	+11.3%
1959	18,283	+9.5%
1967	21,000	+14.9%
1970	23,266	+10.8%
1979	29,074	+25.0%
1989	40,374	+38.9%
1991	42,000	+4.0%
1998	43,500	+3.6%
1999	46,600	+7.1%
2002	43,100	−7.5%
2009	44,167	+2.5%
2012	43,886	−0.6%
2013	43,839	−0.1%
2014	43,826	−0.0%
2023	41,991	−4.2%
2024	41,510	−1.1%
2025	41,020	−1.2%
at 1 January of respective year.

The town and surrounding area has a population of 74,000, while the urban area of Vawkavysk (with adjacent urban settlements of Ros and Krasnosel'skii included) has about 56,000 inhabitants, and the population of the rural area stands at 18,000 people. The main population groups according to nationality in the town of Vawkavysk are: Belarusians (63.4%), Poles (25%), Russians (8.7%), and other nationalities (2.9%). There are people of a total of 50 nationalities living in the area.

According to the 1921 Polish census, the population of the city was 57.3% Polish, 39.3% Jewish, 2.2% Belarusian and 1.1% Russian.

=== Religion ===
According to the Russian census, the population of Vawkavysk was 10,323 people (5,982 women and 4,341 men) in 1897. The main population groups according to religion were: Jews (5,528), Orthodox (2,716), and Roman Catholic (1,943).

== Economy ==
The industrial sections of the city are dominated by the building materials industry (46.4%), and food processing (44%).

- Krasnoselsk-Construcition Materials]] – produces cement and asbestos cement sheets from slate, asbestos pipes and fittings, dry mortar, lime and hydrated developer, soft-granular chalk, concrete slabs for pavements, polyethylene shrink film, blocks of cellular concrete.
- Vawkavysk meat processing plant – one of the largest manufacturers of meat and meat products in the Grodno region and Belarus. The company produces beef, pork, and horsemeat products
- Bellakt – the only company in Belarus that produces powdered infant formula and cereals for babies from the first days of life to one year and older. The company also produces a wide range of dairy products and whey products for animal feed.
- Vawkavysk Machine Building Plant – has a monopoly within the CIS in the field of casting pan mixers and mixers for abrasive masses. In addition, the company manufactures equipment for the preparation of concrete and mortar, press-forging equipment, farm use (grinding-mixing plants for the preparation of feed, dung conveyors, pumps for liquid manure). The company produces a wide range of consumer good of metal and plastic.
- Vawkavysk factory HMAC – production capacity and structure of primary production is divided into pressing and welding, mechanical and assembly plant located in the main building. The company specializes in the production of construction and finishing machines, as well as consumer goods (hardware and lock products, rubber products for sanitary devices, hardware tools, gardening tools).

== Sites of interest ==
The Vawkavysk archaeological complex includes three hills: "the Swedish mountain", Zamchishche, and Muravelnik. "The Swedish mountain" is located in a southeast suburb of modern Vawkavysk.

The archaeological study of Vawkavysk begun in 1925 by the director of the Grodno Museum of History-Archaeology, Jozef Jodkowski, who was the author of several history books about the area as well as travel guides on Grodno and the vicinity, which were popular in the Second Polish Republic.

Other local sights include the Roman Catholic Church of St. Wenceslas (1846–1848) and the Peter Bagration Museum.

== People ==
- Mikalay Autukhovich (born 1963), Belarusian businessman and political dissident, political prisoner
- Ludwik Benoit (1920–1992), Polish actor
- Benjamin Blumenfeld (1884–1947), Russian chess master
- Aleksandr Dedyushko (1962–2007), Russian television actor, best known for war dramas and the Russian version of "Dancing with the Stars".
- Eliyahu Golomb (1893–1945), leader of the Jewish defense effort in Mandate Palestine and architect of the Haganah between 1920 and 1948.
- Dawid Janowski (1868–1927), Jewish-Polish chess player
- Paul Khomich (1893–1942), Roman Catholic Church priest
- Tadeusz Kruczkowski (born 1961), historian, president of Związek Polaków na Białorusi (2000–2005)
- Raphael Lemkin (1900–1959), known for defining the term genocide and drafting the Convention on the Prevention and Punishment of the Crime of Genocide
- Teresa Torańska (1944–2013), Polish journalist, writer, historian
- Maksim Vitus (born 1989), football player
- Zerach Warhaftig (1906–2002), Israeli lawyer and politician and a signatory of Israel's Declaration of Independence.
- Yanina Zhejmo (1909–1987), Soviet actress.
- Ida Oranovich Creskoff (1899-1982), Graduate of Temple University (1921) and the University of Pennsylvania Law School (1924). First woman ever appointed Clerk of a U.S. Federal Court of Appeals (1947), and still only woman to hold the position upon her retirement in 1967.

== See also ==
- Grodno Governorate
