= Vehicle registration plates of Greece =

Hellenic Republic
- Greek plate (Piraeus Prefecture)
- Country: Greece
- Country code: GR

Current series
- Size: 520 mm × 110 mm 20.5 in × 4.3 in
- Material: Metal (aluminium)
- Serial format: ABC-1234 (The first 2 of 3 letters represent the prefecture code where the car was registered.)
- Colour (front): Black on white
- Colour (rear): Black on white

Availability
- Issued by: Ministry of Infrastructure and Transport

Greek vehicle registration plates are composed of three letters and four digits per plate (e.g. ΑΑΑ–1000) printed in black on a white background. The letters represent the district (prefecture) that issues the plates while the numbers range from 1000 to 9999. In 2004, a blue strip was added on the left showing the country code of Greece (GR) in white text and the Flag of Europe in yellow. Similar plates but of square size with numbers ranging from 1 to 999 are issued for motorcycles which exceed 50 cc in engine size.

With the exception of Athens and Thessaloniki, which are represented by just the first letter of the three, all other districts are represented by the first 2 letters. The final one or two letters in the sequence changes in Greek alphabetical order after 8,999 issued plates. For example, Patras plates are ΑΧΑ–1000, where ΑΧ represents the Achaia prefecture of which Patras is the capital. When ΑΧΑ–9999 is reached the plates turn to ΑΧΒ–1000 and this continues until ΑΧΧ is finished. The letters are officially letters from the Latin alphabet, but only those letters whose shape (as a capital letter) matches a letter from the Greek alphabet are used, specifically Α, Β, Ε, Ζ, Η, Ι, Κ, Μ, Ν, Ο, Ρ, Τ, Υ, Χ (in Greek alphabetical order). This is because Greece is a contracting party to the Vienna Convention on Road Traffic, which in Annex 2 requires registration numbers to be displayed in capital Latin characters and Arabic numerals. The rule applies in a similar way in Russia, Ukraine, Belarus, Bosnia and Herzegovina and Bulgaria.

Combinations used for overseas residents are L–NNNN (where L = letter and N = number) and are limited. Until 2003, taxis used L–NNNN; the plate was aligned with the prefecture and the letters were colored red.

== History ==
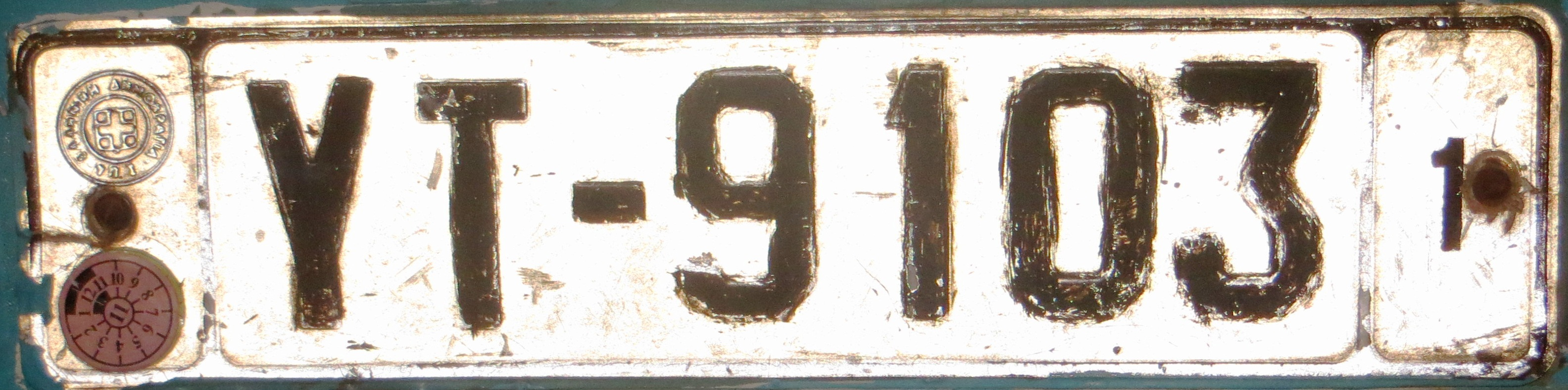
1973–1985

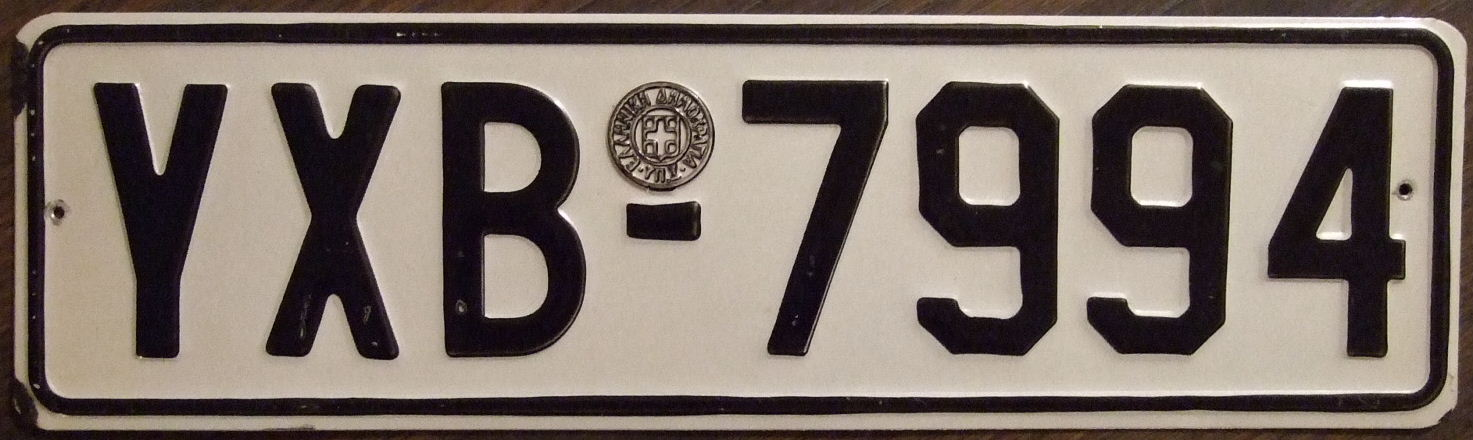
1984–2004

2004 to present

=== 1911–1954 ===
Up until 1954 Greek number plates were quite simple: black numbers on a white background, indicating the serial number shown on the car's license. These started at 1 and advanced to approximately 75,000 when the system was changed. The owner had to provide the plates and specifications were minimal: the size of the plates and numbers, as well as their respective colours. This meant that plates were not very uniform. Taxis had to indicate the initial of the city they were licensed in (e.g. "A" for Athens). In 1954 it was compulsory for all vehicles to change to a new system.

=== 1954–1956 ===
For just 2 years the system was L–NN, L–NNN, L–NNNN or L–NNNNN with black characters on yellow background where L was the initial of the city they were licensed in (e.g. "A" for Athens, "Θ" for Thessaloniki etc.). All these plates display "1953–54" (the initial time period for the change, later revised) in black characters on a white background using a smaller typeface in the top left corner. These plates were compulsorily withdrawn in 1956.

=== 1956-1972 ===
In 1956 the system was again changed to just numbers NNNNNN. NNNNNN could be any number from one to six digits starting once again with "1" and ending this time at about "451000", though not all numbers were allocated. Characters were black on white background with a band at the top of both front and rear plates indicating city/district of registration and type of usage (private, commercial etc.). Sometime after the early 60s the band on the front plate was abandoned and hence that plate became shorter in height, while the band at the rear became blue. This time it was not compulsory to change plates after 1972 when the newer system arrived. Hence these so-called "six-figure plates" can still occasionally (as of 2018) be spotted on a few old vehicles.

=== 1972–1985 ===
In 1972, they became lettered and the system was LL–NNNN while trucks used L–NNNN. Again, they were black characters on white background but with a new typeface. It was not compulsory to change these plates when the newer system arrived.

=== 1984–2004 ===
In 1984, the system changed to LLL–NNNN and the first two letters are prefecture letters (with the exception of the biggest prefectures Attica/Athens and Thessaloniki where only the first letter remained the same). Again, it was not compulsory to change to the newer "euro" plates in 2004.

=== 2004 to present ===
In September/October 2004 the euroband and international country code (GR) were added to the left and the typeface changed. In all other respects the previous system LLL–NNNN continued with the numbering allocation carrying on as from pre-2004.

ABC-1234

=== Historic Vehicle plates ===
Historic vehicle number plates can be issued for vehicles over 30 years old, after they pass the "authenticity" inspection. They came in yellow/blue, white/blue or white/orange depending on the historic vehicle organisation (FILPA or FHVE) and they consist of 4 numbers. Since 2023, new governmental historic plates are now available. They begin with the code IO and they have 5 digits (e.g. IO-12345). Their background is white and they have blue letters.

IO-12345

== Prefectures (in Greek alphabetical order) ==
The first 2 of 3 letters (which are listed below) of a licence plate usually represent the prefecture (nomos) where the car was registered. The almost full list of plates in Greece is below (next to the prefecture / district is its capital or an area within the prefecture that the plates are issued; some prefectures have more than one combination):

Code	Prefecture	Vehicle Type	Use	Other Details
ΑΑ	Achaia – Patras	Car/General	Current	
ΑΒ	Kavala – Kavala	Motorcycle	Current	
ΑΕ	Lasithi – Agios Nikolaos	Motorcycle	Current	
ΑΖ	Achaia – Patras	Car/General	Current	
ΑΗ	Xanthi – Xanthi	Car/General	Current	ΑΗΗ, AHI, AHO omitted.
ΑΙ	Aitoloakarnania – Agrinio	Car/General	Current	ΑΙΙ omitted.
ΑΚ	Laconia – Sparti	Car/General	Current	
ΑΜ	Phokida – Amfissa	Car/General	Current	[Ο, Ρ, Τ, Υ, Χ] (red letters) for tax-free cars.
ΑΝ	Lasithi – Agios Nikolaos	Car/General	Current	
ΑΟ	Achaia – Patras	Motorcycle	Current	Also used in Mount Athos (AO–NNN–NN).
ΑΡ	Argolis (Argolida) – Nafplio	Car/General	Current	
ΑΤ	Arta – Arta	Car/General	Current	
AY	Achaia – Patras	Motorcycle	Current	
ΑΧ	Achaia – Patras	Car/General	Current	
ΒΑ	Magnesia – Volos	Motorcycle	Current	
ΒΒ	Magnesia – Volos	Motorcycle	Current	
ΒΕ	Piraeus	Motorcycle	Current	
BZ	Piraeus	Motorcycle	Current	
ΒΗ	Piraeus	Motorcycle	Current	
ΒΙ	Boeotia (Viotia) – Livadeia	Car/General	Current	
ΒΚ	East Attica – Pallini	Car/General	Current	
ΒΜ	East Attica – Pallini	Car/General	Future	
ΒΝ	West Attica – Elefsina	Car/General	Future	
ΒΟ	Magnesia – Volos	Car/General	Current	ΒΟΡ plates also issued in Pella Prefecture previously.
ΒΡ	West Attica – Elefsina	Car/General	Future	
ΒΤ	Magnesia – Volos	Car/General	Future	
ΒΥ	Boeotia (Viotia) – Livadeia	Car/General	Future	
ΒΧ	Piraeus	Motorcycle	Current	
ΕΑ	Dodecanese – Kos island	Motorcycle	Current	
ΕΒ	Evros – Alexandroupoli	Car/General	Current	ΕΒΒ is omitted.
ΕΕ	Pella – Edessa	Car/General	Current	[E, I] (red letters) for tax-free cars.
ΕΖ	Cyclades – Ermoupoli	Motorcycle	Current	
ΕΗ	Euboea (Evia) – Chalkida	Motorcycle	Current	
ΕΙ	Euboea (Evia) – Chalkida	Motorcycle	Current	
EK	National Transport	Truck	Current	[Α, Β, Ε] (yellow) for trucks used for national goods transport.
ΕΜ	Cyclades – Ermoupoli	Car/General	Current	
ΕΡ	Serres – Serres	Car/General	Current	
ΕΤ	Corfu (Kerkyra) – Corfu	Motorcycle	Current	
ΕΥ	Lefkada – Lefkada	Car/General	Current	[Υ] for tax-free cars of offshore companies; ΕΥΑ also issued in Rhodes previously.
ΕΧ	Kilkis – Kilkis	Car/General	Future	
ΖΑ	Zakynthos – Zakynthos	Car/General	Current	
ΖΒ	Zakynthos – Zakynthos	Car/General	Future	
ΖΕ	Athens	Car/General	Future	
ΖΖ	Athens	Car/General	Current	ZZP issued in Pyraeus previously.
ΖΗ	Athens	Car/General	Current	
ΖΙ	Athens	Car/General	Future	
ΖΚ	Athens	Car/General	Current	
ΖΜ	Athens	Car/General	Current	
ΖΝ	Piraeus	Car/General	Current	
ΖΟ	Athens	Car/General	Future	
ΖΡ	Piraeus	Motorcycle	Current	
ΖΤ	West Attica – Elefsina	Motorcycle	Current	
ΖΥ	East Attica – Pallini	Car/General	Current	
ΖΧ	East Attica – Pallini	Car/General	Current	
ΗΑ	Ilia – Pyrgos	Car/General	Current	HAA is omitted
ΗΒ	Athens	Motorcycle	Current	
ΗΕ	Ilia – Pyrgos	Motorcycle	Current	
ΗΖ	Heraklion – Heraklion	Car/General	Current	
ΗΗ	Heraklion – Heraklion	Motorcycle	Current	
ΗΙ	Heraklion – Heraklion	Motorcycle	Current	
ΗΚ	Heraklion – Heraklion	Car/General	Current	ΗΚΗ and ΗΚΖ issued in Chania previously.
ΗΜ	Imathia – Veria	Car/General	Current	
ΗΝ	Thesprotia – Igoumenitsa	Car/General	Current	
ΗΟ	Xanthi – Xanthi	Motorcycle	Current	
ΗΡ	Heraklion – Heraklion	Car/General	Current	
ΗΤ	Xanthi – Xanthi	Car/General	Future	
ΗΥ	Phthiotis (Fthiotida) – Lamia	Car/General	Future	
ΗΧ	Imathia – Veria	Car/General	Future	
ΙΑ	International Transport	Truck	Current	[Α, Β, Ε] (yellow) for trucks used for international transport.
ΙΒ	Athens	Car/General	Current	
ΙΕ	Athens	Car/General	Current	
ΙΖ	Athens	Car/General	Current	
ΙΗ	Athens	Car/General	Current	IHA issued in Euboea previously.
ΙΙ	Ioannina – Ioannina	Car/General	Future	
ΙΚ	Athens	Car/General	Current	
ΙΜ	Athens	Car/General	Current	
ΙΝ	Ioannina – Ioannina	Car/General	Current	
ΙΟ	Athens	Car/General	Current	
ΙΡ	Athens	Car/General	Current	Used for cars and motorcycles.
ΙΤ	Athens	Car/General	Current	
ΙΥ	Athens	Car/General	Current	
ΙΧ	Serres	Car/General	Current	
ΚΑ	Karditsa – Karditsa	Car/General	Current	ΚΑΑ is omitted.
ΚΒ	Kavala – Kavala	Car/General	Current	ΚΒΒ is omitted.
ΚΕ	Kefalonia and Ithaca – Argostoli	Car/General	Current	KEE is omitted.
ΚΖ	Kozani – Kozani	Car/General	Current	ΚΖΖ is omitted.
ΚΗ	Evrytania – Karpenisi	Car/General	Current	[Ι, Ο, Υ] (orange letters) for state cars.
ΚΙ	Kilkis – Kilkis	Car/General	Current	
ΚΚ	Rhodope – Komotini	Motorcycle	Current	
ΚΜ	Messinia – Kalamata	Car/General	Current	
ΚΝ	Pieria – Katerini	Car/General	Current	ΚΝΖ is omitted.
ΚΟ	Rhodope (Rodopi) – Komotini	Car/General	Current	ΚΟΗ, ΚΟΚ issued in Thessaloniki, ΚΟΗ also issued in Agrinio, ΚΟΡ in Heraklio (motorcycles) previously.
ΚΡ	Corinthia – Corinth	Car/General	Current	
ΚΤ	Kastoria – Kastoria	Car/General	Current	[Ι, Ο, Τ] (red letters) for tax-free cars; [Υ] (orange letters) for state cars.
ΚΥ	Corfu (Kerkyra) – Corfu	Car/General	Current	
ΚΧ	Dodecanese – Kos island	Car/General	Current	[O, Υ, X] (red letters) for tax-free cars; ΚΧΑ issued in Rhodes previously.
ΜΑ	Chalkidiki – Polygyros	Car/General	Future	
ΜΒ	Samos – Samos	Car/General	Future	
ΜΕ	Aitoloakarnania – Messolongi	Car/General	Current	
ΜΖ	Messinia – Kalamata	Motorcycle	Current	
ΜΗ	Lesvos – Myrina (Limnos)	Car/General	Current	[Ι, Ο, Υ] (red letters) for tax-free cars.
ΜΙ	Phthiotis (Fthiotida) – Lamia	Car/General	Current	MII is omitted
ΜΚ	Karditsa – Karditsa	Car/General	Future	
ΜΜ	Pella – Edessa	Car/General	Future	
ΜΝ	Kozani – Kozani	Car/General	Current	
ΜΟ	Samos – Samos	Car/General	Current	[Ι, Ο, Υ] (red letters) for tax-free cars; some MO plates issued in Rhodes previously.
ΜΡ	Laconia – Sparti	Car/General	Future	
ΜΤ	Lesbos – Mytilini	Motorcycle	Current	
ΜΥ	Lesbos (Lesvos) – Mytilini	Car/General	Current	ΜΥΖ issued in Rhodes previously.
ΜΧ	Evros – Alexandroupoli	Car/General	Future	
ΝΑ	Thessaloniki – Thessaloniki	Car/General	Current	
ΝΒ	Thessaloniki – Thessaloniki	Car/General	Current	
ΝΕ	Thessaloniki – Thessaloniki	Car/General	Current	
ΝΖ	Thessaloniki – Thessaloniki	Car/General	Current	
ΝΗ	Thessaloniki – Thessaloniki	Car/General	Current	
ΝΙ	Thessaloniki – Thessaloniki	Car/General	Current	
ΝΚ	Thessaloniki – Thessaloniki	Car/General	Current	
ΝΜ	Thessaloniki – Thessaloniki	Car/General	Current	
ΝΝ	Thessaloniki – Thessaloniki	Car/General	Current	
ΝΟ	Thessaloniki – Thessaloniki	Motorcycle	Current	
ΝΡ	Thessaloniki	Motorcycle	Current	
ΝΤ	Thessaloniki	Motorcycle	Current	
ΝΥ	Thessaloniki	Motorcycle	Current	
NX	Thessaloniki	Motorcycle	Current	
ΝΧ	Prefecture Transport	Truck	Current	[Α, Υ] (yellow letters) for trucks for transport of goods in a prefecture.
ΟΑ	Athens	Motorcycle	Current	
ΟΒ	Athens	Motorcycle	Current	
ΟΕ	Athens	Motorcycle	Current	
ΟΖ	Athens	Car/General	Future	
ΟΗ	Athens	Motorcycle	Current	
ΟΙ	Athens	Motorcycle	Current	
ΟΚ	Athens	Motorcycle	Current	
ΟΜ	Athens	Motorcycle	Current	
ΟΝ	Athens	Motorcycle	Current	
ΟΟ	Athens	Motorcycle	Current	
ΟΡ	Evros – Orestiada area	Car/General	Current	
ΟΤ	Athens	Car/General	Future	
ΟΥ	Athens	Motorcycle	Current	
ΟΧ	Athens	Car/General	Future	
ΡΑ	Florina – Florina	Car/General	Current	[Ι, Ο, Υ] (red letters) for tax-free cars; ΡΑΑ is omitted.
ΡΒ	Corinthia – Corinth	Car/General	Future	
ΡΕ	Rethymno – Rethymno	Car/General	Current	
ΡΖ	Preveza – Preveza	Car/General	Current	ΡΖΒ, PZZ and PZI are omitted for cars.
ΡΗ	Rethymno – Rethymno	Motorcycle	Current	
ΡΙ	Larissa – Larissa	Car/General	Current	
ΡΚ	Dodecanese – Rodos (Rhodes)	Car/General	Current	
ΡΜ	Drama – Drama	Car/General	Current	ΡΜΖ is omitted.
ΡΝ	Grevena – Grevena	Car/General	Current	[Ι, Μ, Ν, Ο, Ρ] (red letters) for trucks.
ΡΟ	Dodecanese – Rhodes (Rodos)	Car/General	Current	
ΡΡ	Larissa – Larissa	Car/General	Current	
ΡΤ	Larissa – Larissa	Car/General	Future	
ΡΥ	Dodecanese – Rodos (Rhodes)	Motorcycle	Current	
ΡΧ	Dodecanese – Rodos (Rhodes)	Car/General	Future	
ΤΑ	Taxis	Taxi	Current	[Α, Β, Ε, Ζ, Η] (yellow plates).
ΤΒ	Corfu (Kerkyra) – Corfu	Motorcycle	Current	
ΤΕ	Corfu (Kerkyra) – Corfu	Car/General	Future	
ΤΖ	Piraeus	Motorcycle	Current	
ΤΗ	Aitoloakarnania – Agrinio	Car/General	Future	
ΤΙ	Pieria – Katerini	Car/General	Future	
ΤΚ	Trikala – Trikala	Car/General	Current	
ΤΜ	Argolis (Argolida) – Nafplio	Motorcycle	Current	
ΤΝ	Trikala – Trikala	Car/General	Future	
ΤΟ	Drama – Drama	Car/General	Future	
ΤΡ	Arcadia – Tripoli	Car/General	Current	
ΤΤ	Rhodope	Car/General	Future	
ΤΥ	Chania – Chania	Motorcycle	Current	
ΤΧ	Preveza – Preveza	Car/General	Future	
ΥΑ	Athens	Car/General	Current	
ΥΒ	Athens	Car/General	Current	
ΥΕ	Athens	Car/General	Current	
ΥΖ	Athens	Car/General	Current	
ΥΗ	Athens	Car/General	Current	YHA issued in Euboea previously.
ΥΙ	Piraeus	Car/General	Current	
ΥΚ	Piraeus	Car/General	Current	
ΥΜ	Piraeus	Car/General	Current	
ΥΝ	Piraeus	Car/General	Current	
ΥΟ	West Attica – Elefsina	Car/General	Current	
ΥΡ	West Attica – Elefsina	Car/General	Current	
ΥΤ	West Attica – Elefsina	Car/General	Current	
ΥΥ	East Attica – Pallini	Car/General	Current	
ΥΧ	East Attica – Pallini	Car/General	Current	
ΧΑ	Euboea (Evia) – Chalkida	Car/General	Current	
ΧΒ	Chania – Chania	Car/Motorcycle	Current	Used for both motorcycles and cars.
ΧΕ	Athens	Car/Motorcycle	Current	Used for both motorcycles and cars.
ΧΖ	Athens	Car/General	Current	
ΧΗ	Athens	Motorcycle	Current	
ΧΙ	Chios – Chios	Car/General	Current	
ΧΚ	Chalkidiki – Polygyros	Car/General	Current	
ΧΜ	Athens	Car/General	Future	
ΧΝ	Chania – Chania	Car/General	Current	
ΧΟ	Chios – Chios	Motorcycle	Current	
ΧΡ	Athens	Motorcycle	Current	
ΧΤ	Athens	Motorcycle	Current	
ΧΥ	Athens	Motorcycle	Current	
ΧΧ	Athens	Motorcycle	Current	

== Special plates ==
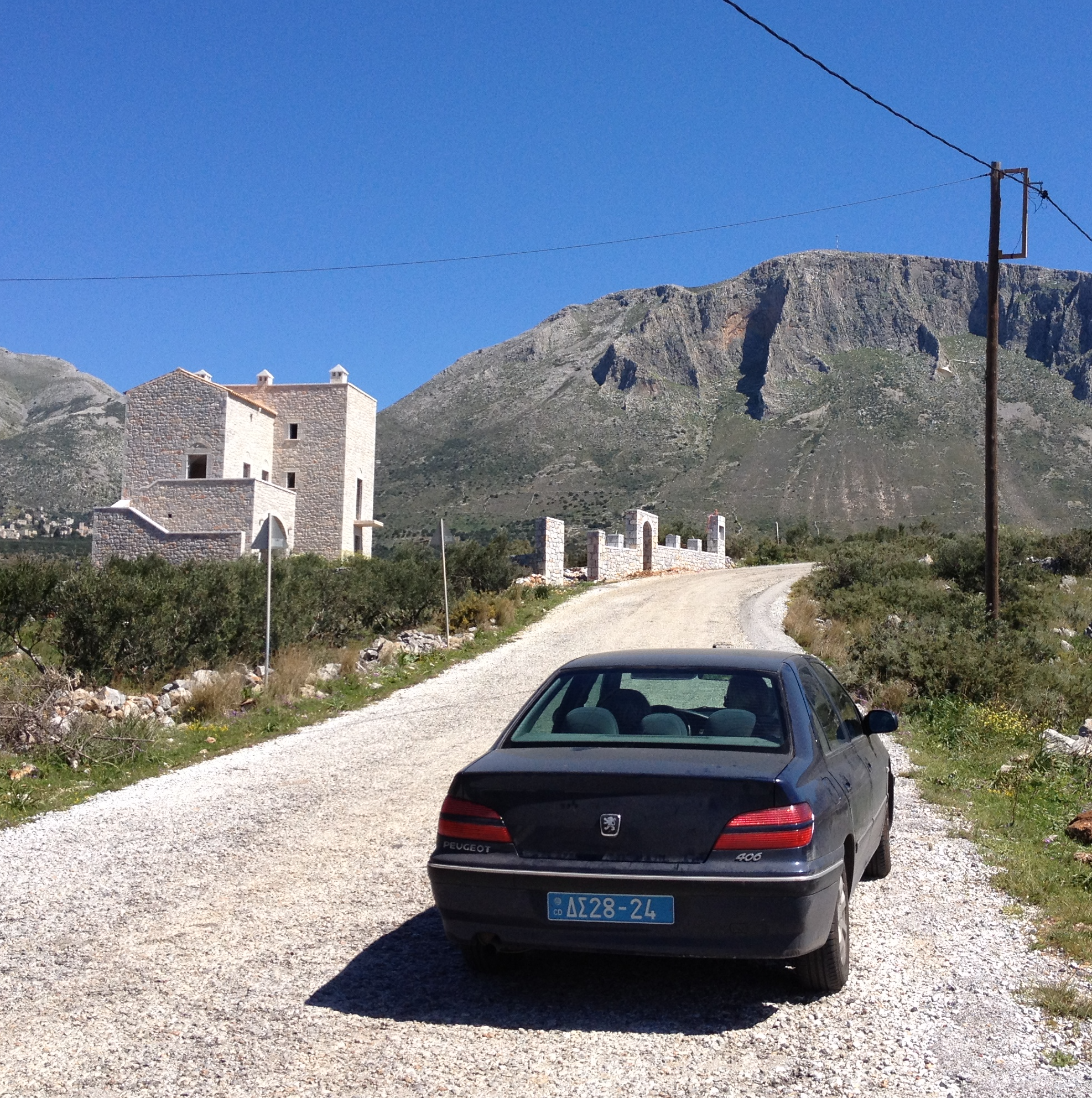
Peugeot 406 with Greek diplomatic licence plate at Gerolimenas, Mani ("28" corresponds to Dutch Embassy)

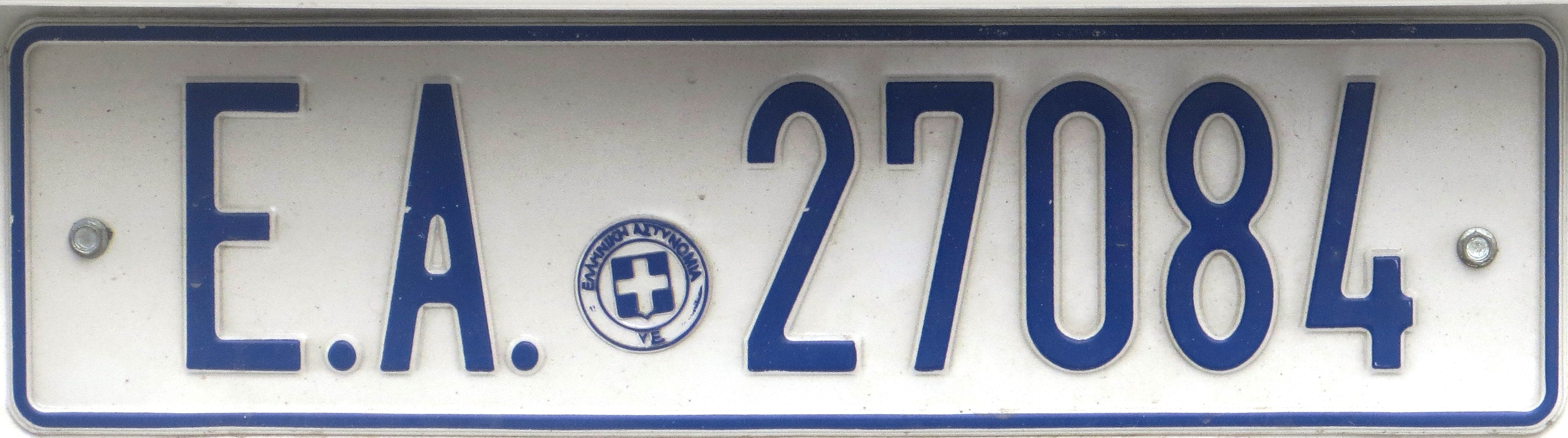
Police

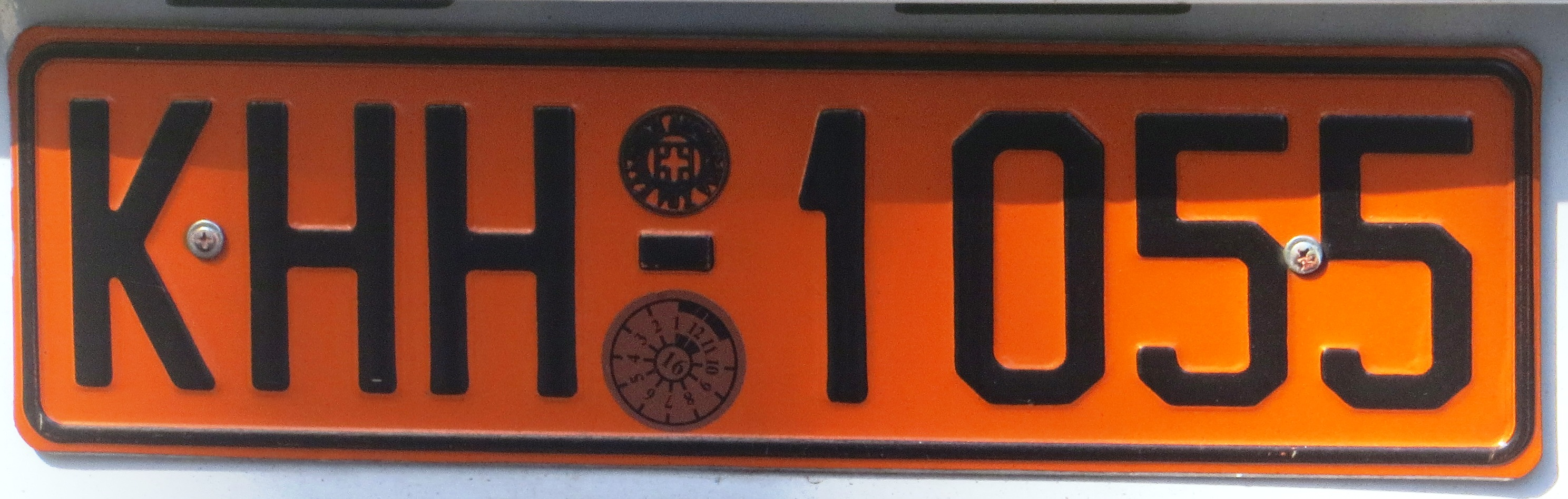
A state vehicle registration plate

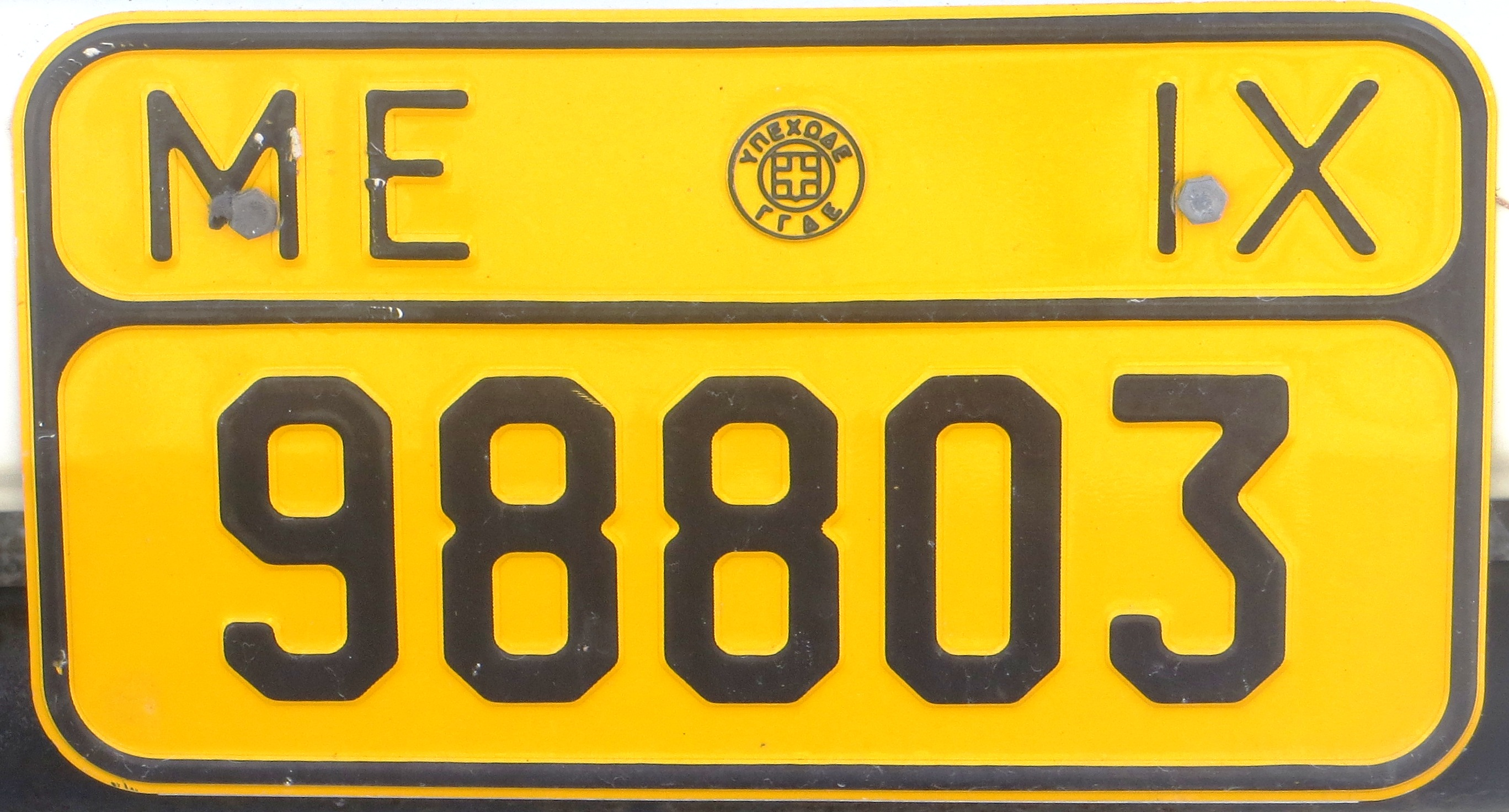
Works vehicles

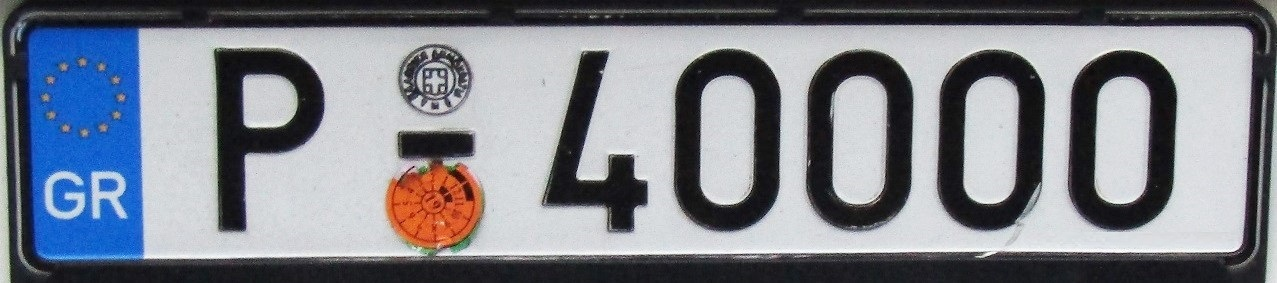
Truck Trailer over 3.5 tonnes without a prime mover.

Vehicles that belong to public services and armed forces use special license plates with the following letter combinations followed by numbers:

- ΑΙΑ (Athens International Airport service vehicles) — (white coloured with black lettering, unofficial plates)
- ΑΝ.Π. (Ανάπηροι Πολέμου, Anapiroi Polemou) — Disabled in war (blue coloured with white lettering; same look as diplomatic plates)
- ΔΟΚ (Δοκιμαστικές, Dokimastikes) — Test plates – (issued to dealers when specific criteria are met: can be used interchangeably on all cars in dealers stock which do not have normal number plates)
- ΔΣ (Διπλωματικό Σώμα, Diplomatiko Soma) — Corps Diplomatique or foreign delegation (e.g. ΔΣ 48 CD, ΔΣ 48–1 CD) (blue-coloured)
- Ε.Α. or ΕΛ.ΑΣ. (Ελληνική Αστυνομία, Elliniki Astynomia) — Hellenic Police
- ΛΣ (Λιμενικό Σώμα, Limeniko Soma) — Coast Guard
- ΞΑ (Ξένες Αποστολές, Xenes Apostoles) — Foreign missions (orange coloured)
- ΕΣ (Ελληνικός Στρατός, Ellinikos Stratos) — Hellenic Army
- ΠΑ (Πολεμική Αεροπορία, Polemiki Aeroporia) — Hellenic Air Force
- ΠΝ (Πολεμικό Ναυτικό, Polemiko Naftiko) — Hellenic Navy
- ΠΣ (Πυροσβεστικό Σώμα, Pyrosvestiko Soma) — Fire Guard
- ΠΚ (Πρόεδρος της Κυβέρνησης, Próedros tis Kyvérnisis) — President of the Government, i.e. the Prime Minister of Greece

The following categories are conflicting: The same letter combinations are used for both public services and specific regions:

- ΑΜ (Αγροτικά Μηχανήματα, Agrotika Mekhanemata) — Agricultural vehicles
- ΚΥ (Κρατική Υπηρεσία, Kratiki Ypiresia) — State
- ΜΕ (Μηχανήματα Έργων, Mekhanimata Ergon) — Public works vehicles (yellow coloured)

For truck trailers over 3.5 tonnes without a prime mover:

The letter P followed by a hyphen and 5 or 4 numerals is used.

Also:

- T* (Τρέιλερ, Trailer) — New trailer plates for private owners, since 2022 (white coloured with black lettering, combinations from TA to TX, 5 digits)
- IO (Ιστορικά Οχήματα, Istorika Ochimata) — New official plates for oldtimer vehicles, since 2023 (white coloured with blue lettering, 5 digits)

== Allied Forces in Greece (AFG) plates ==
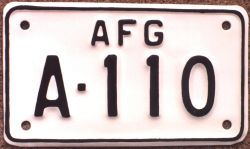
An AFG motorcycle license plate

Very similarly to AFI plates in Italy, AFG plates have the same structure with four digits (instead of five in Italy) for cars and three digits for motorcycles. The first letter indicates the military base (A: Athens, I: Heraklion, T: Thessaloniki). AFG plates are solely distributed to US service members on Greek soil.
