= Kazakovtsy =

Village in Grodno County, Belarus

- Village
- Location within Belarus
- Country: Belarus
- Region: Grodno
- District: Masty
- Selsoviet: Dubno

Population (2009)
  - Total: 16

Kazakovtsy (Note: Belarusian: Казакоўцы; transcription: Kazakoŭcy; Russian: Казаковцы; Polish: Kozakowce.) is a village in Grodno Region, Belarus located in the Dubno Selsoviet, Masty District. In 2009 the population was 16 people.

== History ==
During the interwar period, the village was located in Poland in Gmina Dubno, Grodno County, Białystok Voivodeship. In 1921 the village was inhabited by 112 people, all of which were Belarusians and belonged to Belarusian Orthodox Church.
