= Roman Werfel =

Polish politician

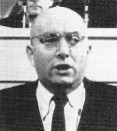
Roman Werfel

Roman Karol Werfel (24 May 1906 in Lwów – 2003, United Kingdom), was a Polish Communist politician of Jewish descent, active during the reign of Stalinism in the People's Republic of Poland. He was an editor-in-chief of "Nowe Drogi", the leading organ of the Central Committee of the communist United Workers' Party (1952–1959), and from 1948 director of party publishing house Książka i Wiedza.

Roman Werfel took part in preparing the acts of indictment in practically all major political trials (Rzepecki, Mierzwa & Niepokolczycki, Puzak, Tatar, bishop Kaczmarek) and had this to say about the much-hated Communist secret police, the UB or Bezpieka: "There's one principle you have to stick to, in beating: Johnny has to be beaten by Johnny, and not by Moshe." (Torańska, p. 109).

Werfel was one of the older members of the Polish Communist Party. Following the onset of World War II he escaped to the Soviet Union, and actively connected with Nowe Widnokręgi, a Communists periodical published in Moscow. In the post-war period Werfel was twice chief editor of Głos Ludu (up to 1949 official party daily before the Trybuna Ludu was started). In spring 1955 he was appointed chief editor of Trybuna Ludu, and removed from that position on 11 May 1956. From the first Party congress, deputy member of the party's Politbiuro. At the second congress in March 1954 re-elected to that position.

== Sources ==
- Teresa Torańska, Them: Stalin's Polish Puppets, HarperCollins Publishers (May 1988), 384 pages, translated by Agnieszka Kolakowska, ISBN 978-0-06-091493-6 (paperback, hardcover)
- About Roman Werfel at the Blinken Open Society Archives
