= Teresa Torańska =

Polish journalist and writer

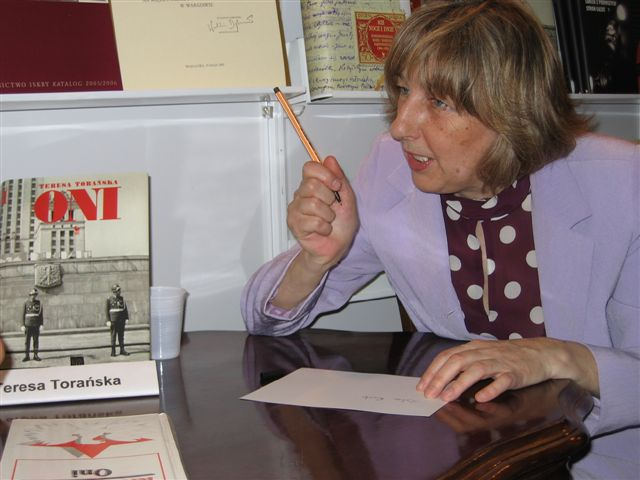
- Teresa Torańska, Warsaw, May 22, 2005
- Born: January 1, 1944; Wołkowysk, Poland
- Died: January 2, 2013 (aged 69); Warsaw, Poland
- Occupations: Journalist, writer

Teresa Sławomira Torańska (January 1, 1944 – January 2, 2013) was a Polish journalist and writer. She was perhaps best known for her award winning monograph, Oni (English: Them: Stalin's Polish Puppets).

== Biography ==
Teresa Torańska was born on January 1, 1944, in Wołkowysk (since 1945 in Belarus), which was then part of the Second Polish Republic occupied by the Soviet Union. Following World War II she graduated from the Warsaw University's Department of Law. She worked as a journalist for the popular Polish weekly "Kultura" in the 1970s, and then throughout the following decade, for the leading Polish émigré literary journal Kultura paryska, banned in communist Poland and published in Paris, France. Her book Them (Pl:Oni) was a breakthrough best seller that led to frequent parallels with Oriana Fallaci as a superb interviewer. Her probing interviewing style is perhaps best demonstrated by her disrobing on camera expose of the communist strongman General Wojciech Jaruzelski. In the 1990s, Torańska hosted two television programs for Telewizja Polska (TVP): socio-political "Teraz Wy" (Now You) and historical "Powtórka z PRL-u" (Rehash from the PRL). Torańska wrote the screenplay for a documentary film Dworzec gdański (Gdańsk Main Station) directed by Maria Zmarz-Kozanowicz. The movie, which premiered in 2007, told a story of the Polish Jews forced to leave Poland after the political crisis of March 1968.

Before her death in 2013, she was a contributor to Poland's second-largest daily newspaper Gazeta Wyborcza, conducting interviews with the leading Polish political figures.

Torańska was perhaps best known for her award winning book Them: Stalin's Polish Puppets (Oni), published in the United States by HarperCollins.

This book, which could not be published in Poland (except in samizdat), contains interviews conducted in 1981-1984 with five formerly prominent Polish Communists (Edward Ochab, Jakub Berman, Roman Werfel, Stefan Staszewski, and Julia Minc, wife of Hilary Minc) who had leading roles in the Stalinist system in Poland in the years 1944-1956. Their frank statements and recollections, under the sharp questioning of a talented journalist, are remarkably revealing both of their mentality as loyal Stalinists (still loyal, for the most part, despite all the subsequent events) and of the political issues and struggles of that time, including the dramatic events of 1956.
— John C. Campbell, Foreign Affairs, Fall 1987.

Teresa Torańska died on January 2, 2013, a day after her 69th birthday, after a long struggle with lung cancer. Torańska was buried on January 9, 2013, at Powązki Military Cemetery.

== Works ==
- Widok z dolu (The View from Below) (reportage), publisher: Iskry; 1 edition (1980), 162 pages, language: Polish, ISBN 978-83-207-0236-1
- Oni (Them: Stalin's Polish Puppets), HarperCollins Publishers (May 1988), 384 pages, translated by Agnieszka Kołakowska, ISBN 978-0-06-091493-6 (paperback, hardcover)
- My (We), publisher: Oficyna Wydawnicza MOST; 1st edition (1994), 295 pages, language: Polish, ISBN 978-83-85611-23-3, also published as e-book
- Byli (Bygones), (reportage), publisher: Świat Książki, Warsaw 2006, 318 pages, language: Polish, ISBN 83-247-0246-6 (hardcover)
- Są – Rozmowa o dobrych uczuciach (They are – Conversation about Good Feelings), Świat Książki, Warsaw 2007, 288 pages, language: Polish ISBN 978-83-247-0791-1 (hardcover)
- Dworzec gdański (Gdańsk Train Station) documentary directed by Maria Zmarz-Kozanowicz, Poland, 2007
- Jesteśmy (We are), Świat Książki – Bertelsmann Media, Warsaw 2008, ISBN 978-83-247-1027-0
- Śmierć spóźnia się o minutę (Death is a minute too late), Biblioteka Gazety Wyborczej, Warsaw 2010, ISBN 978-83-268-0049-8

== Awards ==
- In 2000 Teresa Torańska received the Ksawery Pruszyński Award of the Polish PEN Club for the book Them: Stalin's Polish Puppets.
- Torańska was the first recipient of the annual Barbara Łopieńska Award for the best press interview, received in 2005 for her conversation with Wojciech Jaruzelski.
