= Ludwik Benoit =

Polish film and television actor

Ludwik Benoit (18 July 1920 Wołkowysk, Poland – 4 November 1992, Łódź) was a Polish film and theatre actor.

== Biography ==
Benoit was born on 18 July 1920 in Wołkowysk. He was of French descent through his father.

Benoit was a graduate of the Actor's Studio Gall in Gdańsk in 1946 and from the National Film School in Łódź. He followed in his father's footsteps, who was also an actor. He took roles in both comedic and dramatic movies, in some cases hindered him somewhat distinctive from other actors. According to critics, the best fell on emotional roles, which showed a whole range of feelings.

He was married to actress Maria Zbyszewska. Their son, Mariusz Benoit, is also an actor. In 1970, he married again to Jadwiga Jędrzejczak. They have a daughter, Anna Benoit-Kołosko, a Łódź-based radio journalist.

He was buried in the Alley of Merit at the municipal cemetery pits in Łódź (XI quarters, the government 43, grave 1).
