= Paul Khomich =

Belarusian Servant of God (1893–1942)

Paul Khomich (Belarusian: Paval Homich, 17 October 1893, Volkovysk, Grodno Region – 10 September 1942, Saint Petersburg, now Russian Federation) was a priest of the Roman Catholic Church, the head of the Apostolic Administration of Leningrad.

== Family and education ==
Born into a family of an employee of the district treasury belonging to the Russian Orthodox Church and being baptized Orthodox, Khomich converted to Catholicism in 1905 (when the adoption of the Decree on religious tolerance transition from Orthodoxy to another religion was no longer a criminal offense, a lot of people whose ancestors were Roman Catholic or Greek Catholics left the Orthodox Church). He graduated from Catholic Petrograd Theological Seminary (1916), studied at the Catholic Theological Academy of Petrograd but did not complete his studies there following the closure of the institution in 1918.

== The beginning of the church ==
Khomich was ordained a Catholic priest in 1916 and served in Petrograd and Vyritsa. In 1920, he became head of the Church of the Holy Trinity in Pskov, and conducted services in the branch chapels Island, Day and Porkhov. In 1923, several members of the Catholic clergy of Petrograd were arrested. At this time, a young priest from Pskov became the rector of Saint Casimir's Church in Saint Petersburg, and then as administrator of Our Lady of Czestochowa Church in Ligovo and Saint Alexis in Peterhof. Khomich worked with the youth, organizing for her educational and religious circles, teaching young people the commandment of God. In 1926, he headed the third Franciscan order in Leningrad, which consisted of several hundred people.

== Prison and exile ==
In December 1926, he was arrested, released but was soon re-arrested in January 1927. Initially sentenced to three years in prison, and on 27 June 1927 followed by a new sentence of 10 years in prison on charges of "counter-revolutionary religious conduct activities among the youth and the faithful of the parish, as well as the creation of an illegal anti-Soviet brotherhood member of the Third Order Franciscan." On 3 July 1927, he was sent to the Solovki prison camp. Participated in church services held in Herman, preached in Polish and Russian. Unofficially Khomich was considered the head of the community of Catholic priests of the Latin Rite. After the ban of worship, he continued to celebrate Mass in secret. In March 1929, along with other Catholic priests, he was transferred on a penal trip to the Anzer island, where he was held under harsh conditions. Despite this he continued to celebrate mass daily. In 1932, along with other Catholic priests, he was accused of anti-Soviet propaganda among the prisoners – one of the main charges were conducting secret worship. Also priests accused of being "influenced by other prisoners – Catholics by giving cash benefits of amounts received from their colleagues and organizations in the wild in the form of remittances, led talks on religious subjects, recruiting in this way like-minded people in the camp ". During the interrogation, said: "In my letters, I emphasized the fact that he is satisfied with his lot, that is what my God said that bear suffering, enhancing feelings of believers." Khomich was transferred to the prison in Leningrad on 27 May 1933, sentenced to a year of punishment cells and was imprisoned in Siverskoye camps, the Far East, and from 1935 to 1936 again at Solovki prison camp.

== In later years ==
In November 1936, Khomich was released. He lived in the cities of Kostroma, Kaluga and in Siberia. In August 1939, he continued celebrating mass secretly in Leningrad. From 1941 to 1942, secretly took care of the Apostolic Administration of Leningrad. He remained with his parishioners in the city during the siege.

== The last arrest and death ==
On 15 July 1942, at the re-registration of passports he was arrested, accused of organizing the underground church, anti-Soviet and defeatist propaganda and defamation of the Soviet government. On 1 September 1942, he was sentenced to death, nine days later he was executed.

== Beatification ==
In 2003 officially began the process of beatification of Paul Khomich.
