= Masty, Belarus =

Masty Масты (Belarusian) Мосты (Russian) Мosty
- Town
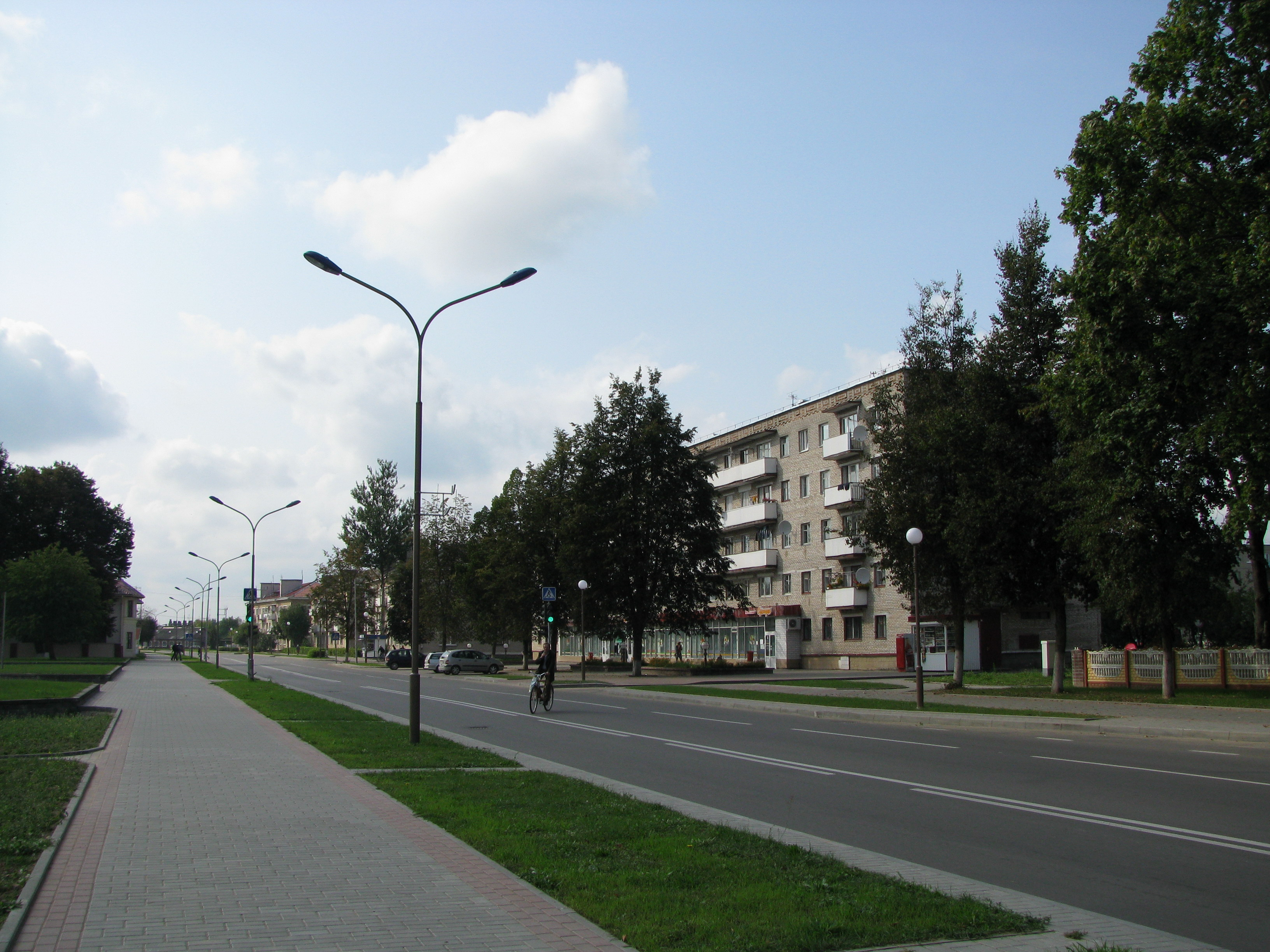

- Flag Coat of arms

- Location within Belarus
- Coordinates: 53°25′1.2″N 24°33′0″E
- Country: Belarus
- Region: Grodno Region
- District: Masty District

Population (2025)
  - Total: 14,239
- Time zone: UTC+3 (MSK)
- Postal code: 231591
- Area code: +375 1515
- Car plates: 4

Masty or Mosty (Note: Belarusian: Масты; Russian: Мосты; Polish: Mosty.) is a town in Grodno Region, Belarus. It serves as the administrative centre of Masty District. As of 2025, it has a population of 14,239.

== History ==
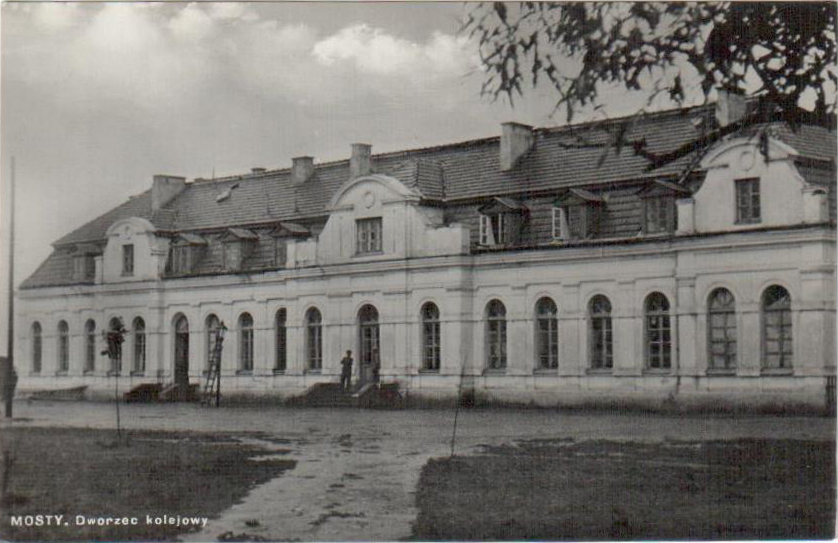
Railway station in the interwar period

Within the Grand Duchy of Lithuania, Masty was part of Trakai Voivodeship. It was located on a trade route connecting Grodno and Slonim. In 1539, Queen consort of Poland Bona Sforza founded the Saint John the Baptist church. In 1795, Masty was acquired by the Russian Empire as a result of the Third Partition of Poland.

From 1921 until 1939, Mosty, as it was known in Polish, was part of the Second Polish Republic, within which it was administratively located in the Grodno County in the Białystok Voivodeship. In the 1921 census, the entire population declared Polish nationality, of which 88.4% were Catholics and 11.3% were of Jewish faith.

At the start of World War II, in September 1939, the town was occupied by the Red Army and, on 14 November 1939, incorporated into the Byelorussian SSR. From 25 June 1941 until 13 July 1944, Masty was occupied by Nazi Germany and administered as a part of Bezirk Bialystok.
