= Masty district =

District of Grodno region, Belarus

Masty district Мастоўскі раён (Belarusian) Мостовский район (Russian)
- District
- Flag Coat of arms

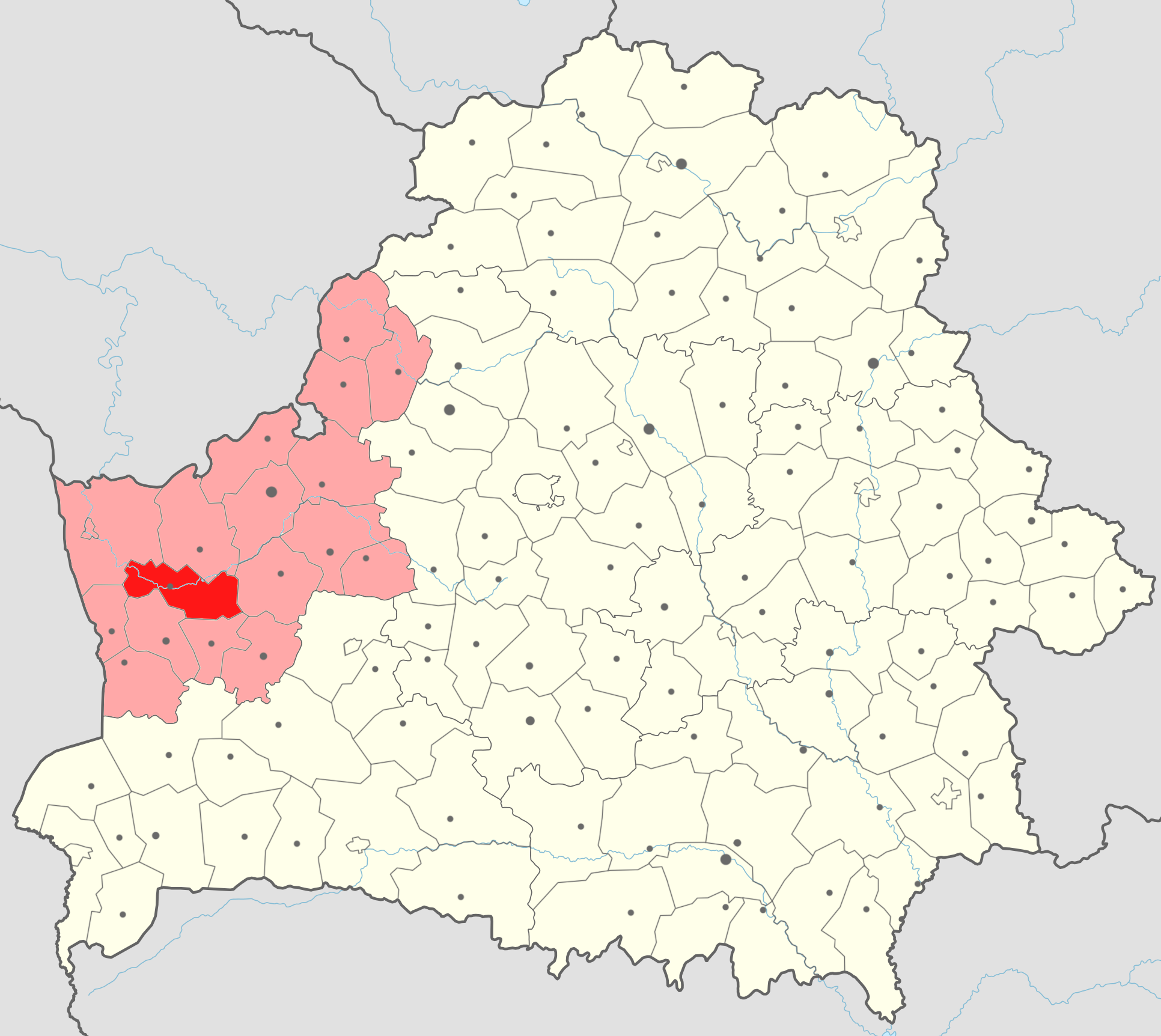
- Coordinates: 53°24′N 24°32′E
- Country: Belarus
- Region: Grodno region
- Administrative center: Masty

Area
  - District: 1,342.04 km^{2} (518.16 sq mi)

Population (2024)
  - District: 25,210
  - Density: 18.78/km^{2} (48.65/sq mi)
  - Urban: 14,447
  - Rural: 10,763
- Time zone: UTC+3 (MSK)

Masty district (Belarusian: Мастоўскі раён; Russian: Мостовский район) is a district (raion) of Grodno region in Belarus. The administrative centre is Masty. As of 2024, it has a population of 25,210.

== Notable residents ==
- Piotra Krecheuski (1879, Dubna village – 1928), Belarusian statesman and president of the Rada of the Belarusian Democratic Republic
