= Vehicle registration plates of Belarus =

Republic of Belarus
- Currently issued Belarus plate for passenger cars - pre-green BY letters.
- Country: Belarus
- Country code: BY

Current series
- Size: 520 mm × 110 mm 20.5 in × 4.3 in
- Serial format: 1234 AB-5 (5 being the regional code)
- Colour (front): Black on white (for standard non-EV plates)
- Colour (rear): Black on white (for standard non-EV plates)

Belarusian vehicle registration plates are currently mainly composed of four digits – the vehicle identifier, two letters – the number plate series, and the region code – a final digit indicating the region of Belarus in which the vehicle was registered. The placement of the series letters varies for the weight class or type of the vehicle:

- 1234 AB-5 - for automobiles with up to 7 seats and up to 3.5 tonnes maximum authorised mass, and two-wheeled vehicles such as motorcycles (categories A, B);
  - E123 AB-5 – for electric automobiles;
- AB 1234-5 - for automobiles with more than 3.5 tonnes of weight, trucks and buses (categories C, D);
  - AB E123-5 – for electric trucks and buses;
- A1234B-5 - for trailers.
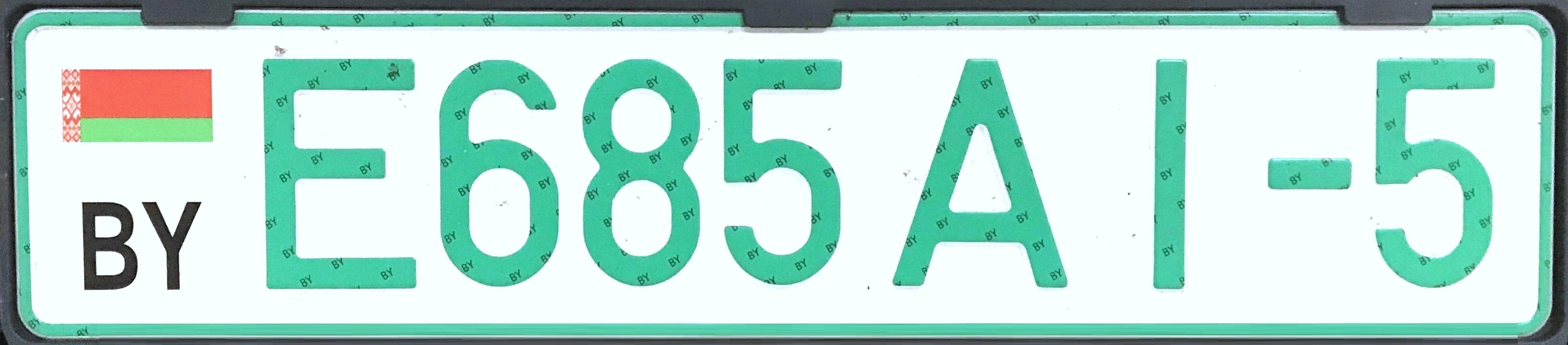
Currently issued Belarus plate for passenger electric cars

Currently issued Belarus plate for trailers (rear)

Currently issued Belarus plate for trucks and buses
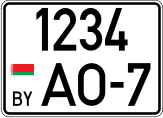
Currently issued Belarus plate for passenger cars, trailers and semitrailers (small rear plate version)

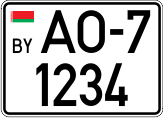
Currently issued Belarus plate for trucks and buses (small rear plate version)

Currently issued Belarus plate for Motorcycles, Mopeds, Scooters, sidecars.

Currently issued Belarus plate for Tractors, Tractor Trailers and Semitrailers.

== Car registration ==
The letters used for plate series are confined to those appearing in both the Belarusian Cyrillic and Latin alphabets – A, E, I, O, B, C, H, K, P, T, X.

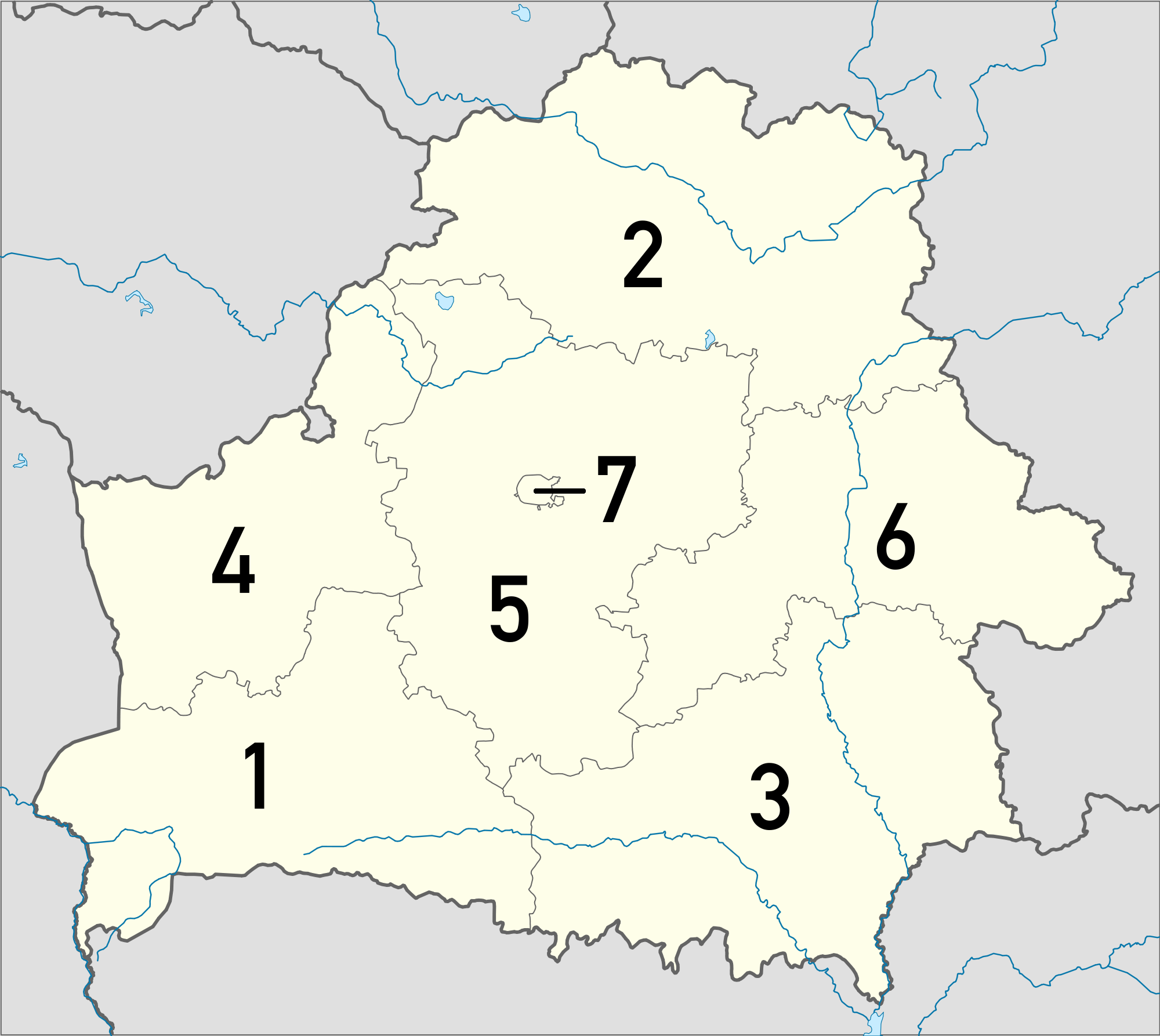
Map of regions of Belarus with associated region codes

Following region codes are used:

- 1 - Brest Region

(Belarusian: Брэсцкая вобласць, Russian: Брестская область)

- 2 - Viciebsk Region

(Belarusian: Віцебская вобласць, Russian: Витебская область)

- 3 - Homieĺ Region

(Belarusian: Гомельская вобласць, Russian: Гомельская область)

- 4 - Hrodna Region

(Belarusian: Гродзенская вобласць, Russian: Гродненская область)

- 5 - Minsk Region

(Belarusian: Мінская вобласць, Russian: Минская область)

- 6 - Mahilioŭ Region

(Belarusian: Магілёўская вобласць, Russian: Могилёвская область)

- 7, 8* - Minsk (city)

(Belarusian: горад Мінск, Russian: город Минск)

*On 4 March 2025, the head of the State Traffic Police Viktar Ratchankow announced that all possible combinations of license plate numbers for region code 7 have been exhausted. Due to this, a reserve code "8" will be issued for vehicles registered in city of Minsk.

The codes are assigned by alphabetic order of region names in Russian, with Minsk city outside of this order. It mostly coincides with the same order in Belarusian, except for Mahilioŭ Region preceding Minsk Region in the latter.

Occasionally, the digit 0 is used instead of region code to indicate that the vehicle is property of Ministry of Defense, State Border Committee or Internal Troops of Ministry of Internal Affairs.

== Special plates ==
Front and rear plates for cars and buses diplomatic missions, representatives of international organizations

Front and rear plates for cars and buses of consular offices

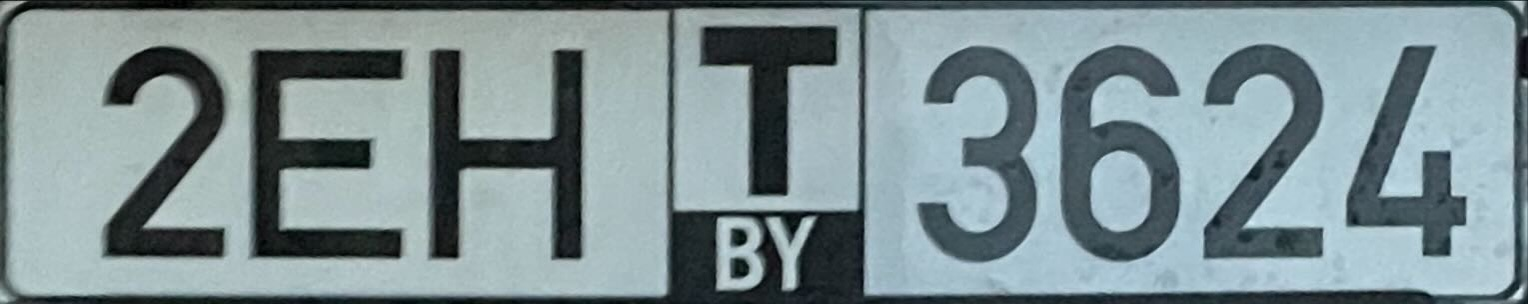
Temporary/transit plate

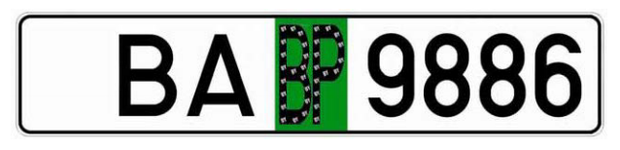
Temporary plate (for new cars)

Taxi plate

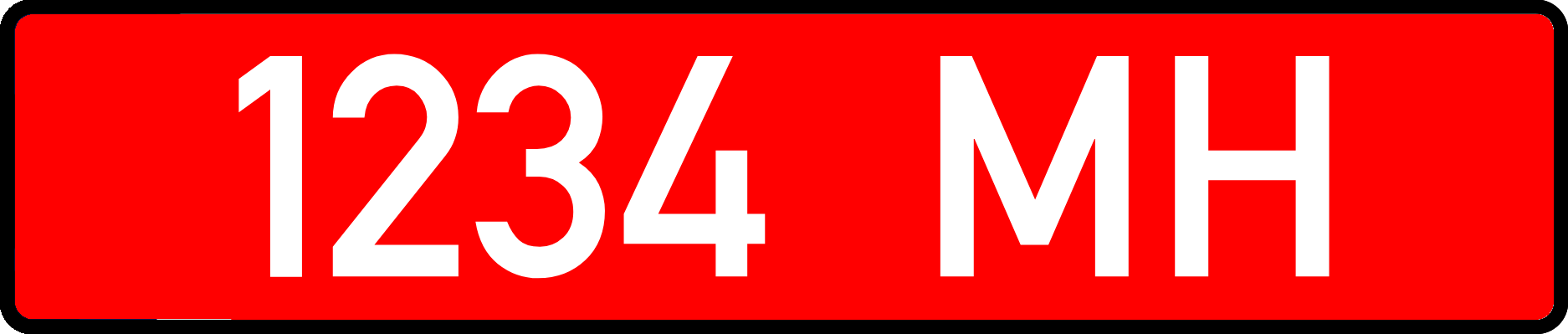
Ministry of Internal Affairs

Ministry of Defense

State Border Committee

Diplomatic plates have the represented country or organization stated using the first 2 digits.

=== List of codes ===
First digits	Country or organization
01	Executive Committee of the CIS
02	Armenia
03	Brazil
04	Bulgaria
05	United Kingdom
06	Hungary
07	Germany
08	Georgia
09	Israel
10	India
11	Iraq
12	Iran
13	Italy
14	Kazakhstan
15	China
16	North Korea
17	Cuba
18	Kyrgyzstan
19	Latvia
20	Libya
21	Lithuania
22	Moldova
23	Nepal
24	Netherlands
25	South Korea
26	Poland
27	Russia
28	Romania
29	Vatican
30	Slovenia
31	United States
32	Tajikistan
33	Turkmenistan
34	Turkey
35	Ukraine
36	France
37	Czech Republic
38	Switzerland
39	Sweden
40	Estonia
41	Serbia
42	Japan
43	International Science and Technology Center
44	Economic Court of the CIS
45	Ministry of Foreign Affairs
46	Palestine
47	Azerbaijan
48	Sweden
49	Vietnam
50	Malta
51	United Nations
52	World Bank
53	European Bank for Reconstruction and Development
54	Organization for Security and Cooperation in Europe
55	Red Cross
56	International Organization for Migration
57	International Monetary and Financial Committee
58	International Monetary Fund
59	European Union
60	Syria
61	Venezuela
62	United Arab Emirates
63	Sri Lanka
64	Mongolia
65	Belgium
66	Executive Committee of the CIS
67	Germany
68	Russia
69	United States
70	Cyprus
71	Libya
72	Iceland
73	Uruguay
74	Oman
75	South Africa
76	Peru
77	Bahrain
78	UNICEF
79	Dominican Republic
80	North Macedonia
81	Austria
82	Finland
83	Kazakhstan
84	Eurasian Development Bank
85	Croatia
86	Spain

== History ==
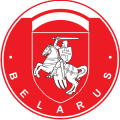
Plate seal (1992–1996)

Licence plate of Belarus, 1992–1996

Soviet-era registration plates for Belarus carried a pair of two-digit numbers followed by letters in Cyrillic (e.g. 12 34 MББ). Following independence, in 1992 the format of Belarusian registration plates became red characters — four digits and two letters on a white background — with the national crest (Pahonia) in the centre, separating the digits from the letters. After the controversial change of the symbols of Belarus in 1995, in 1996 it was replaced by a sticker with the inscription "BELARUS" surrounded by the folk motif found on the current official flag of Belarus.

TX used on registered vehicles driven in foreign countries.

Suffix	Region
БН	Brest
BT	Vitebsk
ГК	Grodno
ГС	Gomel
МБ	Minsk (region)
МГ	Mogilev
МИ	Minsk (city)

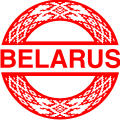
Plate seal (1996–2004)

Vehicles owned by foreign companies used black-on-yellow plates, and the numbers and letters appeared in a different order (e.g. M 1223).

Until 2004, the first letter of the plate series was used to indicate the region of the vehicle's registration, with the rest of the letters being taken from the series A, B, C, E, I, K, M, H, P, O, T, X:

- A Brest
- B Vitebsk
- C Grodno
- E Gomel
- HA, HB, HC, HE, HH, HI, HM, HO, HP, HT, HX Gomel
- HK Minsk
- IA, IB, IC, IE, IH, II Brest
- IK, IM, IO, IT, IX Vitebsk
- IP Minsk (city)
- K, M Minsk (city)
- O, P Minsk (region)
- T Mogilev
- XA, XB, XC, XE, XH, XI Grodno
- XK Minsk (city)
- XM, XO, XP, XT, XX Mogilev
