= List of rural localities in Oryol Oblast =

Map of Russia with Oryol Oblast highlighted

This is a list of rural localities in Oryol Oblast. Oryol Oblast (Russian: Орло́вская о́бласть, Orlovskaya oblast) is a federal subject of Russia (an oblast). Its administrative center is the city of Oryol. Population: 786,935 (2010 Census).

== Dmitrovsky District ==
Rural localities in Dmitrovsky District:

- Alyoshinka

== Dolzhansky District ==
Rural localities in Dolzhansky District:

- Lebyodki

== Khotynetsky District ==
Rural localities in Khotynetsky District:

- Telegino

== Korsakovsky District ==
Rural localities in Korsakovsky District:

- Grunets
- Korsakovo

== Krasnozorensky District ==
Rural localities in Krasnozorensky District:

- Krasnaya Zarya

== Kromskoy District ==
Rural localities in Kromskoy District:

- Venderevo

== Livensky District ==
Rural localities in Livensky District:

- Navesnoye

== Novoderevenkovsky District ==
Rural localities in Novoderevenkovsky District:

- Domny

== Orlovsky District ==
Rural localities in Orlovsky District:

- Kuliki

== Pokrovsky District ==
Rural localities in Pokrovsky District:

- Droskovo
- Fyodorovka
- Kritovo
- Nizhny Turovets
- Setenyovo

== Shablykinsky District ==
Rural localities in Shablykinsky District:

- Petrushkovo

== Soskovsky District ==
Rural localities in Soskovsky District:

- Pechki
- Soskovo
- Yelkovo

== Trosnyansky District ==
Rural localities in Trosnyansky District:

- Trosna

== Zalegoshchensky District ==
Rural localities in Zalegoshchensky District:

- Gusevo
- Ivan
- Mokhovoye

== Znamensky District ==
Rural localities in Znamensky District:

- Znamenskoye

== See also ==
- Lists of rural localities in Russia
