= Krasnaya Zarya (rural locality) =

Krasnaya Zarya (Russian: Кра́сная Заря́) is the name of several rural localities in Russia.

== Modern localities ==
- Krasnaya Zarya, Arkhangelsk Oblast, a village under the administrative jurisdiction of Privodino Urban-Type Settlement with Jurisdictional Territory in Kotlassky District of Arkhangelsk Oblast
- Krasnaya Zarya, Republic of Bashkortostan, a village in Usen-Ivanovsky Selsoviet of Belebeyevsky District in the Republic of Bashkortostan; 54°15′N 54°20′E
- Krasnaya Zarya, Chelyabinsk Oblast, a settlement in Novouralsky Selsoviet of Varnensky District in Chelyabinsk Oblast
- Krasnaya Zarya, Chuvash Republic, a settlement in Berezovskoye Rural Settlement of Ibresinsky District in the Chuvash Republic
- Krasnaya Zarya, Republic of Crimea, a selo in Bakhchisaraysky District of Republic of Crimea
- Krasnaya Zarya, Kostroma Oblast, a settlement in Stepanovskoye Settlement of Galichsky District in Kostroma Oblast; 58°26′N 42°32′E
- Krasnaya Zarya, Krasnodar Krai, a settlement in Pervomaysky Rural Okrug of Kushchyovsky District in Krasnodar Krai; 46°26′N 39°32′E
- Krasnaya Zarya, Krasnoyarsk Krai, a village in Bychkovsky Selsoviet of Bolsheuluysky District in Krasnoyarsk Krai
- Krasnaya Zarya, Lgovsky District, Kursk Oblast, a khutor in Banishchansky Selsoviet of Lgovsky District in Kursk Oblast
- Krasnaya Zarya, Manturovsky District, Kursk Oblast, a khutor in Ostaninsky Selsoviet of Manturovsky District in Kursk Oblast
- Krasnaya Zarya, Sovetsky District, Kursk Oblast, a village in Gorodishchensky Selsoviet of Sovetsky District in Kursk Oblast
- Krasnaya Zarya, Leningrad Oblast, a settlement under the administrative jurisdiction of Sverdlovskoye Settlement Municipal Formation in Vsevolozhsky District of Leningrad Oblast; 59°50′N 30°35′E
- Krasnaya Zarya, Lipetsk Oblast, a village in Bigildinsky Selsoviet of Dankovsky District in Lipetsk Oblast; 53°28′N 39°5′E
- Krasnaya Zarya, Novgorod Oblast, a village in Pestovskoye Settlement of Pestovsky District in Novgorod Oblast
- Krasnaya Zarya, Glazunovsky District, Oryol Oblast, a settlement in Taginsky Selsoviet of Glazunovsky District in Oryol Oblast; 52°23′N 36°2′E
- Krasnaya Zarya, Krasnozorensky District, Oryol Oblast, a settlement in Krasnozorensky Selsoviet of Krasnozorensky District in Oryol Oblast; 52°47′N 37°40′E
- Krasnaya Zarya, Kromskoy District, Oryol Oblast, a settlement in Kutafinsky Selsoviet of Kromskoy District in Oryol Oblast; 52°39′N 35°34′E
- Krasnaya Zarya, Shablykinsky District, Oryol Oblast, a settlement in Navlinsky Selsoviet of Shablykinsky District in Oryol Oblast; 52°56′N 35°4′E
- Krasnaya Zarya, Azovsky District, Rostov Oblast, a khutor in Alexandrovskoye Rural Settlement of Azovsky District in Rostov Oblast; 46°50′N 38°58′E
- Krasnaya Zarya, Millerovsky District, Rostov Oblast, a khutor in Verkhnetalovskoye Rural Settlement of Millerovsky District in Rostov Oblast; 48°53′N 40°25′E
- Krasnaya Zarya, Saratov Oblast, a stopping platform in Balashovsky District of Saratov Oblast
- Krasnaya Zarya, Kamensky District, Tula Oblast, a village in Molchanovsky Rural Okrug of Kamensky District in Tula Oblast
- Krasnaya Zarya, Yefremovsky District, Tula Oblast, a village in Pushkarsky Rural Okrug of Yefremovsky District in Tula Oblast
- Krasnaya Zarya, Tver Oblast, a settlement in Luzhnikovskoye Rural Settlement of Vyshnevolotsky District in Tver Oblast
- Krasnaya Zarya, Vladimir Oblast, a settlement in Gus-Khrustalny District of Vladimir Oblast
- Krasnaya Zarya, Volgograd Oblast, a khutor in Panfilovsky Selsoviet of Novoanninsky District in Volgograd Oblast
- Krasnaya Zarya, Vologda Oblast, a settlement in Velikoselsky Selsoviet of Kaduysky District in Vologda Oblast
- Krasnaya Zarya, Voronezh Oblast, a settlement in Maloalabukhskoye Rural Settlement of Gribanovsky District in Voronezh Oblast

== Alternative names ==
- Krasnaya Zarya, alternative name of Zarya, a settlement in Korzhovogolubovsky Rural Administrative Okrug of Klintsovsky District in Bryansk Oblast; 52°46′N 32°19′E
- Krasnaya Zarya, alternative name of Krasny Kotelshchik, a village in Leontyevskoye Rural Settlement of Stupinsky District in Moscow Oblast; 55°2′N 38°16′E
- Krasnaya Zarya, alternative name of Krasnoye Znamya, a settlement in Mokhovskoy Selsoviet of Pokrovsky District in Oryol Oblast; 52°45′N 36°42′E
