= 399th Rifle Division =

399th Rifle Division (September 1941) 399th Rifle Division (March 1, 1942 – August 1945)
- Active: 1941–1945
- Country: Soviet Union
- Branch: Red Army
- Type: Division
- Role: Infantry
- Engagements: Battle of Stalingrad; Battle of Kursk; Operation Kutuzov; Gomel-Rechitsa offensive Parichi-Bobryusk offensive Operation Bagration; Bobruisk Offensive; Lublin-Brest Offensive; Vistula-Oder Offensive; East Prussian Offensive
- Decorations: Order of the Red Banner; Order of Suvorov
- Battle honours: Novozybkov

Commanders
- Notable commanders: Col. Nikolai Gregorovich Travnikov; Col. Andrei Ivanovich Surchenko; Col. Dmitry Mikhailovich Ponomarev; Col. Pyotr Ivanovich Skachkov; Maj. Gen. Daniil Vasilevich Kazakevich

The 399th Rifle Division was an infantry division of the Red Army. Partially raised in 1941, this formation was abandoned until a second formation began in February 1942, this time in the far east of Siberia. The formation lasted until July, after which it was moved west to join the Stalingrad Front in the great bend of the Don River. Badly mauled in its first actions, it was rebuilt west of the Don in late July, and went on to contest the German advance right into the center of the city. The remnants of the division were pulled out and sent north to Bryansk Front, and the once-again rebuilt division went on to serve in the winter offensive against the German forces in the salient around Oryol. It was present on the right flank of the Kursk salient during the German offensive in July 1943 but saw little action until the Soviet forces went on the counterattack later that month. During the advance into western Russia it earned a battle honor. Through the winter of 1943-44 it helped to make incremental gains against the forces of Army Group Center, setting the stage for the summer offensive, during which the division would win its first decoration. Later that year it advanced into Poland and in early 1945 it took part in the battles for East Prussia, and won the Order of the Red Banner for its efforts. The division was disbanded shortly thereafter.

== 1st Formation ==
The 399th Rifle Division began forming in September 1941 in an unknown military district. Very little is known about this formation:

"Twenty other divisions were formed in September 1941 in various locations (table 5.21). Very few data have been found on the last seven divisions [including the 399th] formed in September. These divisions were never assigned to a frontline unit. They may have been used on the Turkish border, in Iran, or in the Far East."

== 2nd Formation ==
The second 399th Rifle Division began forming from February to March 1, 1942 near Chita in the Transbaikal Military District. Its order of battle, based on the first wartime shtat (table of organization and equipment) for rifle divisions, was as follows:

- 1343rd Rifle Regiment
- 1345th Rifle Regiment
- 1348th Rifle Regiment
- 1046th Artillery Regiment
- 436th Antitank Battalion
- 232nd Reconnaissance Company
- 345th Sapper Battalion (from April 23, 1945 313th Sapper Battalion)
- 918th Signal Battalion (later 451st Signal Company)
- 511th Medical/Sanitation Battalion
- 220th Chemical Protection (Anti-gas) Company
- 566th Motor Transport Company
- 400th Field Bakery
- 831st Divisional Veterinary Hospital
- 1858th Field Postal Station
- 1177th Field Office of the State Bank

Col. Nikolai Gregorovich Travnikov took command of the division on March 1. During that month its personnel were noted as being mostly Siberian. The new division began moving west by rail in July.

=== Battle of Stalingrad ===
As soon as it reached the front it was thrown into battle as part of the 1st Tank Army west of Stalingrad, in the great bend of the Don River. As a fresh division it was much needed in the line, but its inexperience soon led to heavy losses. On July 28, in an unusual procedure, it was disbanded, then reformed the same day with replacement troops and the same commander and staff; due to the latter fact this was not officially considered a new formation. When 1st Tank Army was disbanded on August 6, the 399th was transferred to 62nd Army, and had a strength of 12,322 men. At this time the division was defending against German Sixth Army, immediately west of Kalach-na-Donu. A renewed German offensive drive succeeded in encircling much of 62nd Army by the end of August 8; surviving elements of the division made their way east of the river. Over the next two weeks the rebuilding division defended along the Don to the south of Lake Peschanoe.

This position became compromised between August 21 – 23 when XIV Panzer Corps thrust from the Don to the Volga just north of Stalingrad. By the following day, the 399th was being threatened with encirclement by the 295th Infantry Division. At this time the division had a strength of somewhere between 2,000 – 3,000 men. On August 25 the German 71st Infantry Division crossed the Don north of Kalach with two regiments, and the 399th was forced to withdraw five to eight kilometres to the east. Despite this, the two German divisions nearly had the Soviet division encircled again by late on the 27th, but due to 62nd Army counterattacks elsewhere, this pressure was relieved and the 399th, along with the rest of the army's left wing, withdrew to the Rossoshka River.

By September 3 the division was under command of 23rd Tank Corps, continuing to fall back to the city. By September 7 it had been forced back to the western outskirts of the suburban villages of Gorodishche and Aleksandrovka; at this time it had a reported infantry strength of just 195 men. On the 9th, Gorodishche was lost to the German 389th Infantry Division. As it continued to fall back towards the center of Stalingrad, the remnants of the 399th were ordered by the new commander of 62nd Army, Lt. Gen. V.I. Chuikov, to withdraw to new defensive positions in the wooded hills west of Krasnyi Oktiabr village as a scant reserve.

By September 13 the remaining forces of the division were being referred to as a "composite regiment", and many accounts of the fighting in this period mention a "399th Rifle Regiment". On the following day, the German 71st Infantry Division began its assault into central Stalingrad, and the 399th was redeployed southwards, as one of Chuikov's few reserves. By the end of the next day, the division was reported as having just 36 men in the line. At this point, discipline collapsed. On September 16, the chief of Stalingrad Front's NKVD, N. N. Selivanovsky, sent a report to Moscow which included the following:

"From 13 through 15 September, the blocking detachment of 62nd Army's Special Department detained 1,218 men... The majority of those detained came from 10th NKVD Division and the associated regiment of 399th Rifle Division, which was abandoned on the field by the regiment commander and commissar. For displayed cowardice – fleeing from the field of battle and abandoning units to the mercy of their fate, the commander of the associated regiment of 399th Rifle Division, Major Zhukov, and the commissar, Senior Politruk Raspopov, have been shot in front of the ranks."

Following this, the remnants of the division were relieved and ordered north to the 3rd Tank Army in the Reserve of the Supreme High Command south of Moscow. On October 2 Colonel Travnikov was replaced in command by Col. Andrei Ivanovich Surchenko. In December the 399th was assigned to Bryansk Front. In January, 1943 the division joined the 48th Army in that Front, and remained with that army for the duration of the war, with the exception of a few months in early 1944.

== Battles for Oryol and Kursk ==
In heavy fighting during February 8 - 12 the 48th Army liberated the village of Droskovo. Following this it formed a powerful shock group consisting of the 6th Guards Rifle Division, 9th Ski Brigade, three tank regiments and later the 399th and committed it in the Pokrovskoye sector. Attacking the German defenses at the boundary between the 2nd Panzer Army's XXXV and LV Army Corps on February 14 the group advanced almost 30 km (19 mi) in four days of heavy fighting, reaching the Neruch River by the end of the 17th. The Army continued a steady advance against German defenses at the eastern tip of the Oryol salient, by February 22 reaching positions from 70 km (43 mi) east of Oryol to the northern outskirts of Maloarkhangelsk, 70 km (43 mi) southeast of the city. On the same day Colonel Surchenko handed his command to Col. Dmitry Mikhailovich Ponomarev. The commander of 2nd Panzer sent his 216th Infantry Division from Oryol to reinforce the sector and the advance was brought to a halt three days later.

In early March Bryansk Front prepared for another attempt to force the Neruch and drive towards Oryol. 48th Army formed two shock groups, one of which was composed of the 399th, 6th Guards and 16th Rifle Divisions, 9th Ski Brigade, the 42nd and 43rd tank regiments and over half of the Front's available artillery. However, after more than a month of continuous combat all three divisions were reduced to 3,000 - 4,500 men each. The assault began on March 6, on a sector north of Maloarkhangelsk, but the two shock groups failed to even dent the German defenses and it was called off a few days later. Following this both sides went into a relative lull to rebuild and prepare for the summer offensives.

By the start of the Battle of Kursk 48th Army had been transferred to Central Front where it was located on that Front's right (north) flank next to Bryansk Front on the north shoulder of the salient. The 399th was now in the 42nd Rifle Corps, where it would remain for the duration of the war. On July 9 Col. Pyotr Ivanovich Skachkov took over command of the division from Colonel Ponomarev. 48th Army did not see much action during this battle, but following the German defeat it did play an important role in the counteroffensive, Operation Kutuzov, which finally liberated Oryol. During the subsequent advance into western Russia the division was recognized for its part in the liberation of the town of Novozybkov on September 25, and received the town's name as an honorific. Three days later Colonel Skatchkov was in turn replaced by Col. Daniil Vasilevich Kazakevich. He would be promoted to the rank of major general on June 3, 1944 and would be named a Hero of the Soviet Union on April 6, 1945; he remained in command for the duration of the war.

== Into Belarus ==
By the start of October, Central Front had arrived along the Sozh River, as well as part of the Dniepr south of the Sozh. Its next objectives were the cities of Gomel and Rechitsa. The preliminary plan for the offensive called for 65th Army's 19th Rifle Corps to begin an attack against the German XXXV Corps' defenses at Gomel on October 7. Following a regrouping, four of 48th Army's separate divisions would join the offensive as soon as possible, with 42nd Corps and one other division to follow. This regrouping transferred the first three divisions into the bridgehead at Loev (the confluence of the Dniepr and the Sozh) between October 8 and 14. Soon after this 42nd Corps also entered the bridgehead, assigned to the first echelon on a 5-kilometre-wide sector between the village of Bushatin and the Dniepr.

The Gomel-Rechitsa Offensive was launched from the Loev bridgehead early on November 10 on a front of 38 km (24 mi). In three days of fighting the forces of 48th and 65th Armies managed to tear a gap 15 kilometres (9.3 mi) wide and from 8 to 12 kilometres (5.0 to 7.5 mi) deep in the German defenses, and were halfway to Rechitsa. Over the next four days, 42nd Corps drove XXXV Corps back into Rechitsa, and on November 20 the Germans evacuated the city, crossing to the east bank of the Dniepr under pressure from the rifle Corps and 1st Guards Tank Corps to the north. Army Group Center's southern defenses were in a state of crisis by this point, and Ninth Army had been forced out of Gomel. As the German retreat continued, 42nd Corps also crossed the Dniepr and linked up with the rest of 48th Army.

In January, 1944 the commander of the renamed Belorussian Front, Army Gen. Konstantin Rokossovsky, planned another offensive to continue his drive towards Parichi and, in the best case, Bobruisk. Beginning on January 16, 29th and 42nd Corps, along with a corps of 65th Army and backed by two separate tank regiments and the SU-76s of 1897th SU Regiment, were to attack on a 15-kilometre-wide sector from Shatsilki on the Berezina River southwestward to Zherd Station on the Shatsilki – Kalinkovichi rail line. They faced the German 253rd Infantry Division and roughly half of the 36th Infantry Division. On the overall attack sector the Red Army had, with reserves, about a 3 to 1 advantage in infantry, but was weak in armor. The 399th was shifted southward across the Berezina River into its Corps' second echelon. From the outset, the two rifle corps struggled to penetrate the German forward defenses. On January 19 one regiment of the division, which was now in first echelon, was able to exploit the success of the neighboring 95th Rifle Corps and advance on the German strongpoint at Medved from the west. The next day the fresh 170th Rifle Division took up the battle for Medved, and under immense pressure the defenders had no choice but to abandon that village and the nearby position at Pechishche.

Exploiting this success the 172nd Rifle Division of 95th Corps, with the 399th on its right flank, burst open the German defenses at the boundary between the 134th and 36th Infantry Divisions east of Zareche on January 20. The two rifle divisions then pushed forward 3 km (1.9 mi) west of the village of Molcha by the end of the next day. After six days of intense fighting, 48th Army's shock group managed to advance between five and ten kilometres on a front of roughly 20 km (12 mi). 42nd Corps was regrouped and ordered to attack northwestward toward Dubrova, Yasvin and Sosnovka, 15–25 km (9.3–15.5 mi) west and northwest of Shatsilki, beginning on January 24. This renewed attack caught the Germans off-balance as they were preparing new defenses. In four more days of heavy fighting the 399th captured Zareche the next day, then fought a seesaw battle for Dubrova on January 26/27. Despite giving up considerable ground the 36th Infantry finally halted the Corps' advance at Sosnovka. By day's end on January 27 the most advanced elements of 48th Army were just 15 km (9.3 mi) from the outskirts of Parichi. But this had come at a cost, and Rokossovsky called a temporary halt on that date, with the offensive to resume on February 2. The new effort, during which 42nd Corps was in second echelon, made only limited gains in four days of combat, and another halt was called on February 6. On the 14th the Army began the first of two local offensives to improve its positions, gaining only about 2 km (1.2 mi) before being stalled again by German reinforcements. The second began early in the morning of February 22. The 399th was one of eight understrength rifle divisions, backed by about 70 tanks of the 1st Guards Tank Corps, that again struck a German divisional boundary and then drove 4–5 km (2.5–3.1 mi) north and northwest before being halted on the 24th.

During this winter the division was receiving infantry replacements from the 146th Reserve Rifle Regiment. In March the 42nd Corps, with the 399th, came under the command of 50th Army in the renamed 1st Belorussian Front. During April the Corps was again reassigned, now to the Front's 3rd Army, before returning to 48th Army in June.

=== Operation Bagration ===
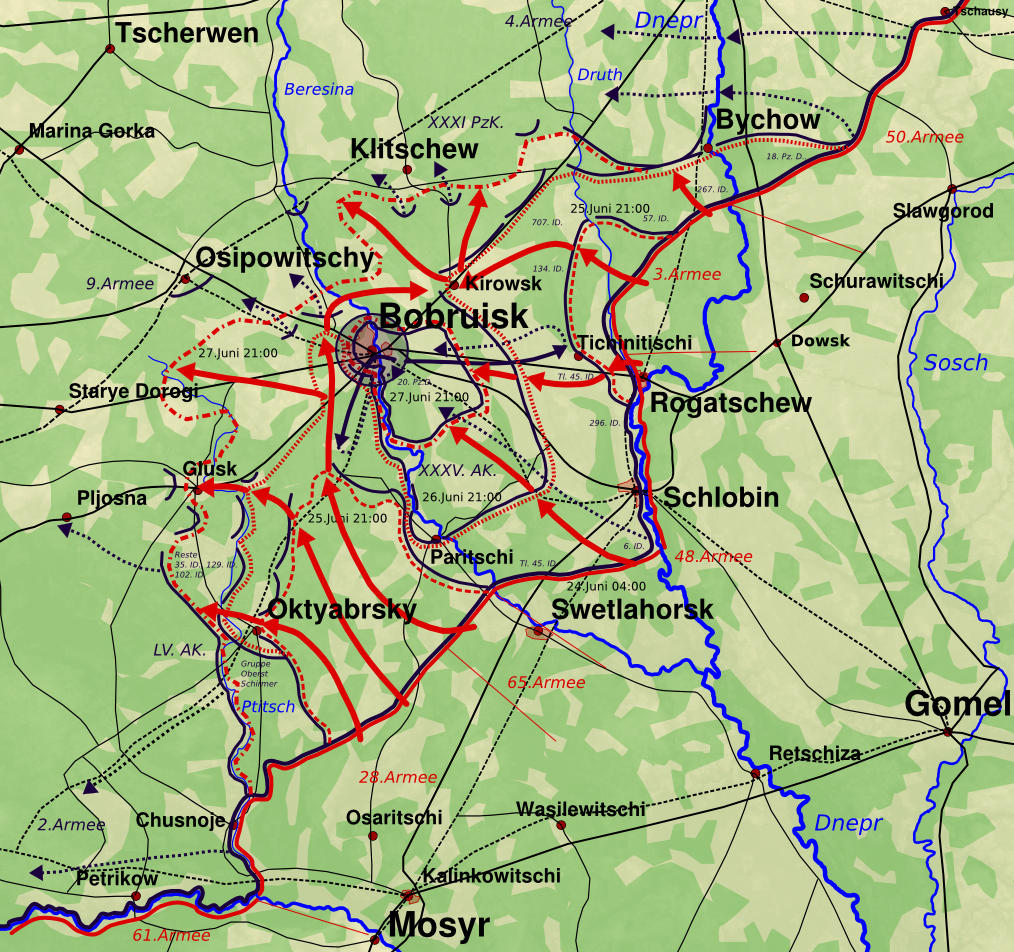
Development of the Bobruisk Operation. Note that nearly all of 48th Army began north of Rogachev.

During the Soviet summer offensive the 42nd Corps, now consisting of the 399th, 170th and 137th Rifle Divisions, was concentrated north of Rogachev to assist its partner 29th Corps and units of the 3rd Army to break through the positions of the German 134th and 296th Infantry Divisions. The 48th Army command chose to make its main attack with the two rifle corps, reinforced with artillery and tanks, along the 7 km (4.3 mi) Kostyashevo - Kolosy sector, in the direction of Repki, Turki and Bobruisk, break through the German defense and then reach the rear of its Zhlobin group of forces, cut it off from the crossings over the Berezina and then encircle and destroy it in conjunction with the 65th Army. The Corps was specifically assigned to a 1,000m front north of the line from Kostyashevo to outside of Kolosy, backed by the 22nd Breakthrough Artillery Division, and after rupturing the German front would develop the offensive in the direction of Koshary with the aim of gaining bridgeheads over the Dobysna River by the end of the second day. When the offensive began on June 23 both corps faced the difficult task of crossing the broad, swampy floodplain of the Drut River, but after heavy fighting the leading troops managed to capture the second German trench line by 1100 hours. Fighting for the third line continued unsuccessfully until evening.

The second day began with another 2-hour artillery preparation against XXXV Corps' positions at Rogachev. Following this the 399th was one of 11 rifle divisions that attacked the two shaken German divisions and by evening the shock groups had advanced 5 km (3.1 mi) west of the city. With the Germans overwhelmed the 9th Tank Corps began exploiting to the rear, gaining 10 km (6.2 mi). By midnight on the 25th 42nd Corps was part of a force driving due west towards Bobriusk and threatening to cut off six German divisions southwest of the city. This encirclement was completed over the next two days, and overnight on June 27/28 the 48th Army launched concentric attacks with its three rifle corps (42nd Corps from the east towards Savichi) to split the pocketed force. By 1300 hours all but a small number, hiding in the city, had been killed or captured.

Early on the morning of June 29 the Corps relieved units of the 3rd Army along the Vlasovichi to Titovka sector and prepared to attack Bobruisk from the northeast and east. However, reconnaissance by 356th Rifle Division discovered that the garrison had withdrawn to the city's center while a prisoner revealed that a breakout to the northwest was planned. The Corps' attack began at 0400 hours, crossing the Berezina with the help of the Dniepr Flotilla, and fighting in the eastern part of the city by 0800. The partially-successful breakout considerably reduced German resistance in the city and it was cleared by 1000 hours. Within Bobruisk alone the German 9th Army lost 7,000 officers and men killed and 2,000 captured, 400 guns (100 in working order), 60 knocked-out tanks and assault guns, 500 other motor vehicles, plus six supply depots and 12 trainloads of supplies and equipment. With the defenses of Army Group Center shattered, the division trekked westward towards Poland. On July 2 the 399th was recognized for its part in the defeat of 9th Army at Bobruisk with the Order of Suvorov, 2nd Degree.

By the end of July 11 the 48th Army had reached the east bank of the Zelvyanka River, with its forward detachments forcing crossings on a number of sectors; 42nd Corps was in the Army's second echelon at this time. The next day the Corps was committed into the fighting in the direction of Mezhreche, crushed German resistance along the river and at 0700 hours, in conjunction with 9th Tank Corps and the 40th Rifle Corps of 3rd Army, liberated Zelva. Fighting off several counterattacks by German infantry and tanks, 42nd Corps continued to advance on July 13, reaching a line from Kholstovo to Yuzefuv. Over the next three days 48th Army continued to advance through difficult wooded and swampy terrain up to 30 km (19 mi), reaching the approaches to Bialystok and Brest.

== Into Poland and East Prussia ==
48th Army was transferred to 2nd Belorussian Front in September. In preparation for the Vistula-Oder Offensive 48th Army was moved into the bridgehead over the Narew River at Rozan. It was tasked with launching the Front's main attack in conjunction with 2nd Shock Army on a 6 km (3.7 mi) front with the immediate goal of reaching Mlawa. 42nd Corps had two divisions in the first echelon and the third in second echelon. On the first day of the offensive, January 14, 1945, the Army's forces advanced 3–6 km (1.9–3.7 mi) against stubborn resistance and reached the approaches to Makow, which was taken the next day. A further gain of up to 10 km (6.2 mi) was made on January 16, aided by clearing weather which allowed greater air support. While 48th Army covered another 16 km (9.9 mi) the following day, the 8th Mechanized Corps, which was exploiting through the Army's breakthrough, captured the outer ring of the Mlawa fortified area. On the 18th the 5th Guards Tank Army completed the blockade of the town and by the evening elements of 48th Army reached its outskirts. The German garrison, consisting of remnants of 7th and 299th Infantry Divisions and the 30th Panzergrenadier Regiment, contested the major brick structures and a series of concrete pillboxes, but despite this units of 42nd Corps soon broke into the town. Heavy fighting continued overnight, widely employing artillery firing over open sights and extensive use of tanks and mortars, and by morning the garrison had been destroyed with its remnants taken prisoner.

By now the mobile formations of the Front were pushing north towards the Frisches Haff. On January 26 the 42nd Corps assisted 5th Guards Tank in capturing the towns of Tolkemit and Mühlhausen, severing land communications to the Germans' East Prussian group of forces. 48th Army now turned its front to the northeast to securely close this group's escape route. German attacks to restore communications began almost immediately and on the next day the Corps was transferred to direct command of 5th Guards. By January 30 the escape attempts had been beaten off and 5th Guards began advancing, reaching the Passarge River and fighting for Frauenburg.

By February 1 the Corps had returned to 48th Army but during that month the Army was once again transferred, this time to 3rd Belorussian Front, and the 399th was assigned to 53rd Rifle Corps. The division fought in the East Prussian Offensive, and ended the war near Elbing. On April 5 the division was awarded the Order of the Red Banner for its role in the liberation of the Danzig region and the capture of Marienburg and other East Prussian cities.

Twelve men of the division were named as Heroes of the Soviet Union, two of them posthumously. At the end of the war the men and women of the division carried the full title 399th Rifle, Novozybkov, Order of the Red Banner, Order of Suvorov Division. (Russian: 399-я стрелковая Новозыбковская Краснознамённая ордена Суворова дивизия.) The division had returned to the 42nd Corps in March. It was disbanded in August, under the command of Lieutenant Colonel Shopovalov after Major General Kazakevich left the division on July 7.
