= Korsakovo =

Korsakovo (Russian: Корсаково) is the name of several rural localities in Russia:

- Korsakovo, Republic of Buryatia, a selo in Korsakovsky Somon of Kabansky District of the Republic of Buryatia
- Korsakovo, Kineshemsky District, Ivanovo Oblast, a village in Kineshemsky District, Ivanovo Oblast
- Korsakovo, Lukhsky District, Ivanovo Oblast, a village in Lukhsky District, Ivanovo Oblast
- Korsakovo, Kaluga Oblast, a village in Zhukovsky District of Kaluga Oblast
- Korsakovo, Krasnoyarsk Krai, a village in Sivokhinsky Selsoviet of Taseyevsky District of Krasnoyarsk Krai
- Korsakovo, Moscow Oblast, a village in Kostrovskoye Rural Settlement of Istrinsky District of Moscow Oblast
- Korsakovo, Pervomaysk, Nizhny Novgorod Oblast, a settlement under the administrative jurisdiction of the city of oblast significance of Pervomaysk in Nizhny Novgorod Oblast
- Korsakovo, Perevozsky District, Nizhny Novgorod Oblast, a selo in Ichalkovsky Selsoviet of Perevozsky District of Nizhny Novgorod Oblast
- Korsakovo, Korsakovsky District, Oryol Oblast, a selo in Korsakovsky Selsoviet of Korsakovsky District of Oryol Oblast
- Korsakovo, Trosnyansky District, Oryol Oblast, a village in Trosnyansky Selsoviet of Trosnyansky District of Oryol Oblast
- Korsakovo, Pskov Oblast, a village in Nevelsky District of Pskov Oblast
- Korsakovo, Tula Oblast, a village in Korsakovsky Rural Okrug of Bogoroditsky District of Tula Oblast
