= Kromskoy =

Kromskoy or Kromsky (masculine), Kromskaya (feminine), or Kromskoye (neuter) may refer to:

- Kromskoy District, a district of Oryol Oblast, Russia
- Kromskoy (inhabited locality) (Kromskaya, Kromskoye), name of several rural localities in Russia
