= Soskovo =

Set index of articles associated with the same name

Soskovo (Russian: Сосково) is the name of several rural localities in Russia:

- Soskovo, Moscow Oblast, a village in Guslevskoye Rural Settlement of Taldomsky District of Moscow Oblast
- Soskovo, Oryol Oblast, a selo in Soskovsky Selsoviet of Soskovsky District of Oryol Oblast
- Soskovo, Perm Krai, a village in Yusvinsky District of Perm Krai
