= Agibalov =

Agibalov (Russian: Агиба́лов; masculine) or Agibalova (Агиба́лова; feminine) is a Russian last name. Variants of this surname include Ogibalov/Ogibalova (Огиба́лов/Огиба́лова) and Ogibenin/Ogibenina (Огибе́нин/Огибе́нина).

All these surnames derive from the nicknames "Огибало" (Ogibalo) - or "Агибало" (Agibalo) in dialects with akanye - and "Огибеня" (Ogibenya). The nicknames were in turn derived from the dialectal words "огибала" (ogibala), meaning a sycophant, a flatterer, a trickster, and "огибенить" (ogibenit), meaning to deceive, to swindle. The following people bear this surname:

- Irina Agibalova, a contestant on Dom-2, a Russian reality TV show
- V. I. Agibalov, one of the designers of the statue to Vladimir Lenin in Vynnitsia, Ukraine

== See also ==
- Agibalovo, several rural localities in Russia
- Ogibalovo, several rural localities in Russia
