= Korsakovsky =

Korsakovsky (masculine), Korsakovskaya (feminine), or Korsakovskoye (neuter) may refer to:

- Korsakovsky District, name of several districts in Russia
- Korsakovsky Urban Okrug, a municipal formation in Sakhalin Oblast, Russia, which Korsakovsky District is incorporated as
