= Zelvyanka =

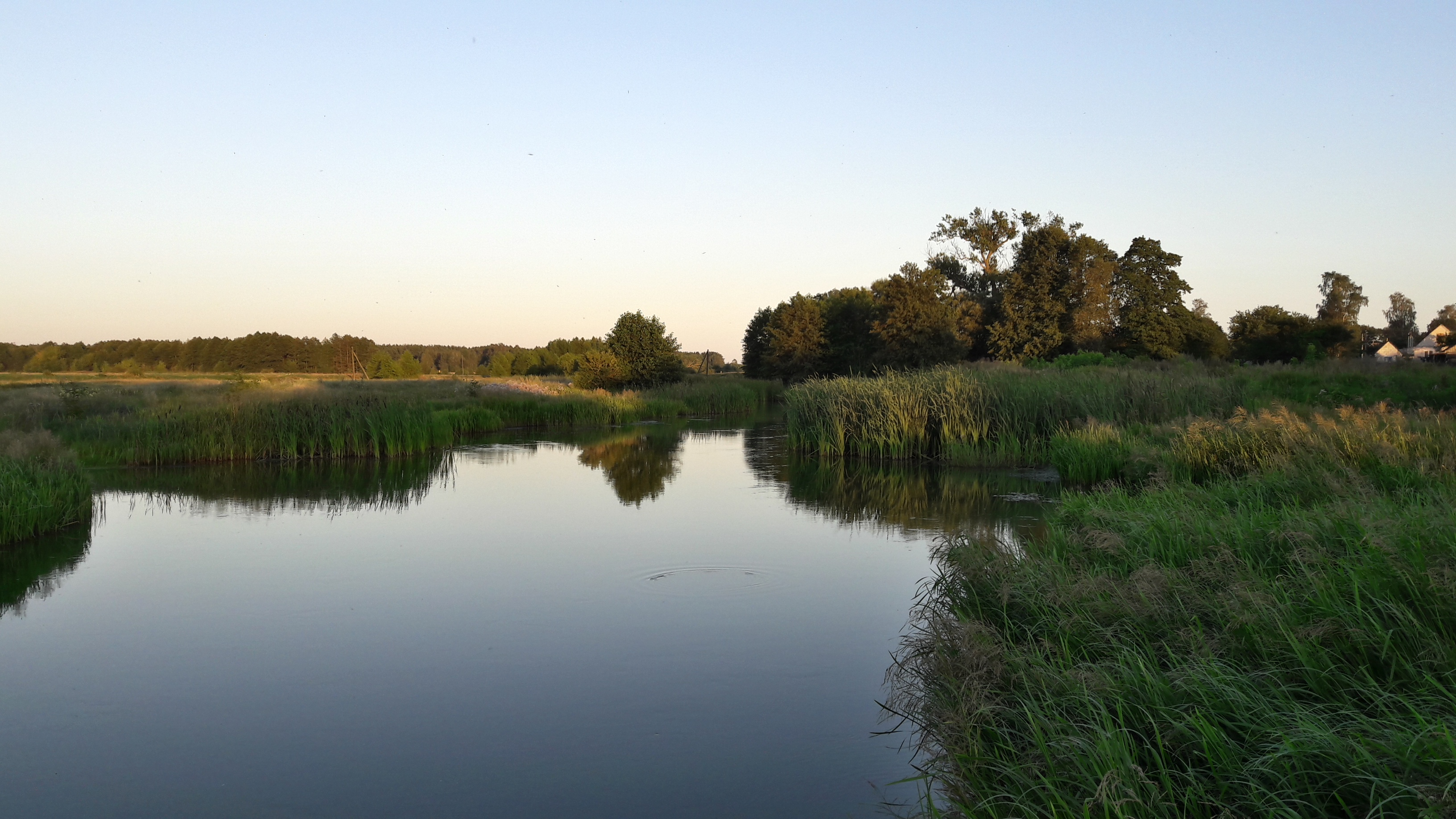

Location
- Country: Belarus

Physical characteristics
- Source
  - location: Belarus
- Mouth: Neman
  - coordinates: 53.4026°N 24.5379°E
- Length: 170 km (110 mi)
- Basin size: 1,940 km^{2} (750 sq mi)

Basin features
- Progression: Neman→ Baltic Sea

The Zelvyanka (Belarusian: Зальвянка/Зэльвянка; Russian: Зельвянка; Lithuanian: Zelva) is a river in Belarus, a left tributary of the Neman.

The river originates between the villages of Lidzyany (Лідзяны, Лидяны) and Kulyavichy (Кулявічы, Кулёвичи) in Svislach District and flows through Grodno Region and Brest Region (Vawkavysk District, Pruzhany District, Zelva District and Masty District).

Its tributaries are Shchyba, Ruzhanka, Ivanawka, Sasva, Samarawka, and Yukhnawka.

Settlements: Masty (by the mouth), Zelva, Papyernya.
