= Kromskoy (inhabited locality) =

Kromskoy (Russian: Кромской; masculine), Kromskaya (Кромская; feminine), or Kromskoye (Кромское; neuter) is the name of several rural localities in Russia:

- Kromskoy (rural locality), a settlement in Bolshekolchevsky Selsoviet of Kromskoy District of Oryol Oblast
- Kromskaya, Kursk Oblast, a village in Kromskoy Selsoviet of Fatezhsky District of Kursk Oblast
- Kromskaya, Oryol Oblast, a village in Topkovsky Selsoviet of Pokrovsky District of Oryol Oblast
