= Telegino =

Telegino may refer to:

- Telegino, Oryol Oblast, a village in Oryol Oblast, Russia
- Telegino, Pskov Oblast, a village in Pskov Oblast, Russia
- Telegino, name of several other rural localities in Russia
