= Golovkino =

Golovkino (Russian: Головкино) is the name of several rural localities in Russia:

- Golovkino, Kaliningrad Oblast, a settlement in Golovkinsky Rural Okrug of Polessky District of Kaliningrad Oblast
- Golovkino, Leningrad Oblast, a village in Nezhnovskoye Settlement Municipal Formation of Kingiseppsky District of Leningrad Oblast
- Golovkino, Oryol Oblast, a village in Gagarinsky Selsoviet of Korsakovsky District of Oryol Oblast
- Golovkino, Pskov Oblast, a village in Dedovichsky District of Pskov Oblast
- Golovkino, Smolensk Oblast, a village in Selenskoye Rural Settlement of Tyomkinsky District of Smolensk Oblast
- Golovkino, Tambov Oblast, a village in Fedorovsky Selsoviet of Sosnovsky District of Tambov Oblast
- Golovkino, Staritsky District, Tver Oblast, a village in Novo-Yamskoye Rural Settlement of Staritsky District of Tver Oblast
- Golovkino, Vyshnevolotsky District, Tver Oblast, a village in Dyatlovskoye Rural Settlement of Vyshnevolotsky District of Tver Oblast
