= Ogibalovo =

Ogibalovo (Russian: Огибалово) is the name of several rural localities in Russia:

- Ogibalovo, Kaluga Oblast, a village in Yukhnovsky District of Kaluga Oblast
- Ogibalovo, Mikhaylovsky District, Ryazan Oblast, a selo in Ivankovsky Rural Okrug of Mikhaylovsky District in Ryazan Oblast
- Ogibalovo, Ryazansky District, Ryazan Oblast, a village in Iskrovsky Rural Okrug of Ryazansky District in Ryazan Oblast
- Ogibalovo, Tver Oblast, a village in Likhachevskoye Rural Settlement of Krasnokholmsky District in Tver Oblast
- Ogibalovo, Vologodsky District, Vologda Oblast, a village in Pudegsky Selsoviet of Vologodsky District in Vologda Oblast
- Ogibalovo, Vozhegodsky District, Vologda Oblast, a village in Ogibalovsky Selsoviet of Vozhegodsky District in Vologda Oblast
