= Fyodorovka, Russia =

Fyodorovka (Russian: Фёдоровка), also spelled Fedorovka, is the name of several inhabited localities in Russia:

- Fyodorovka Microdistrict, a microdistrict in Komsomolsky City District and former urban-type settlement in Samara Oblast; merged into the city of Tolyatti in 2006
- Fyodorovka, a former urban-type settlement in Chelyabinsk Oblast; since 2004—a part of the city of Chelyabinsk
- Fyodorovka, Fyodorovsky District, Republic of Bashkortostan, a rural locality (a selo) in Fyodorovsky District of the Republic of Bashkortostan
- Fyodorovka, Ufimsky District, Republic of Bashkortostan, a rural locality (a village) in Ufimsky District of the Republic of Bashkortostan
- Fyodorovka, Oryol Oblast, a rural locality (a selo) in Oryol Oblast
