= Fyodorovka =

Fyodorovka may refer to the following places:

== Kazakhstan ==
- Fyodorovka, Fyodorov District, Kostanay Region
- Fyodorovka, Uzunkol District, Kostanay Region
- Fyodorovka, West Kazakhstan Region

== Russia ==
- Fyodorovka, Russia, several inhabited localities

== Ukraine ==
- Fedorovka, Ukraine
