= Pechki =

Pechki may refer to:

- Pechki, Oryol Oblast, a village (selo) in Oryol Oblast, Russia
- Pechki, Pskov Oblast, a village in Pskov Oblast, Russia
