= Papyernya rural council =

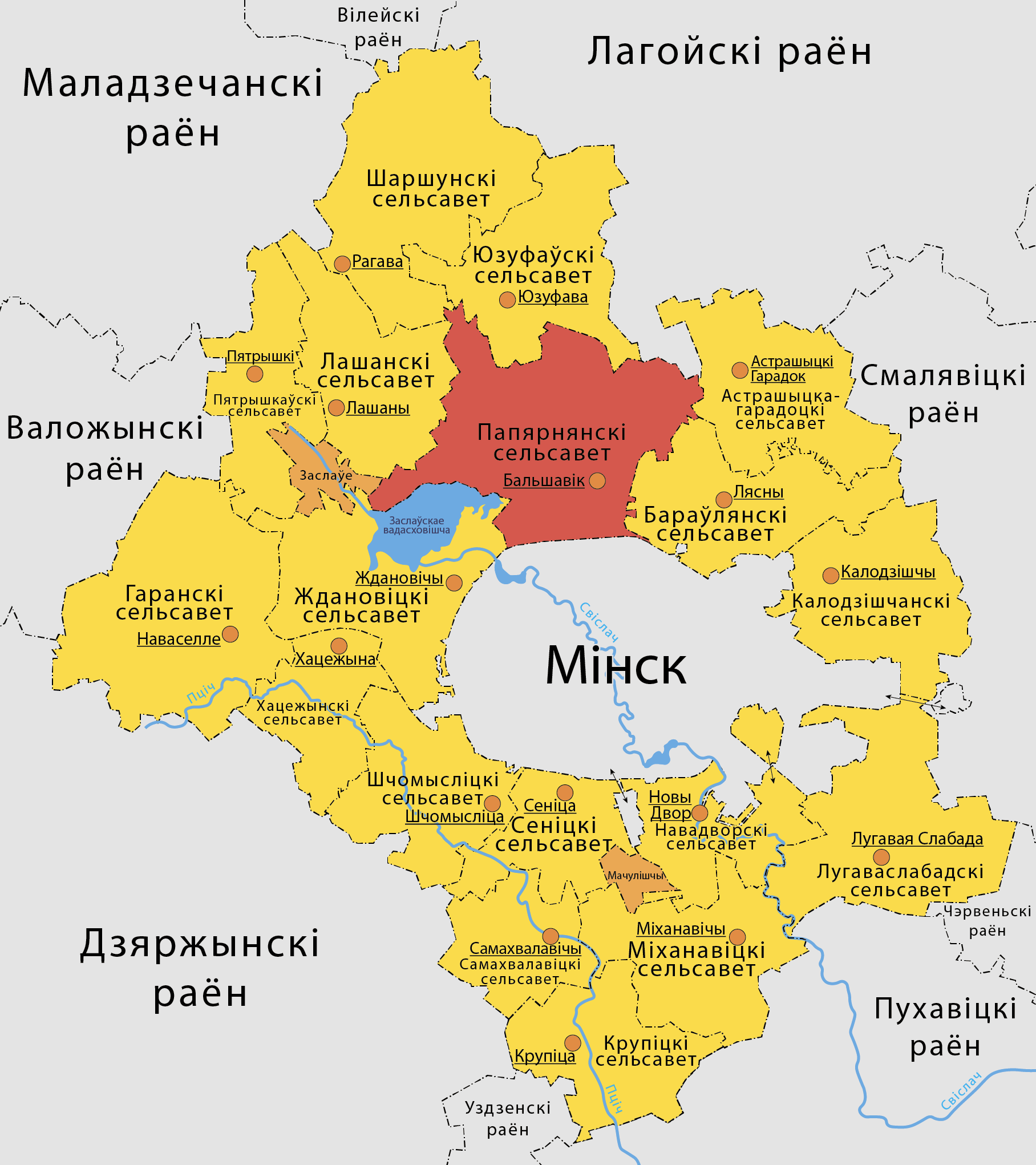
Map of Minsk District

Papyernya rural council (Belarusian: Папярнянскі сельсавет; Russian: Папернянский сельсовет) is a lower-level subdivision (selsoviet) of Minsk district, Minsk region, Belarus. Its administrative center is the agrotown of Balshavik.

== Rural localities ==
The populations are from the 2009 Belarusian census (9,612 total) and 2019 Belarusian census (10,478 total):

Russian name	Belarusian name	Pop. 2009	Pop. 2019
д Аронова Слобода	в Аронава Слабада	357	308
д Ашмянцы	в Ашмянцы	29	39
аг Большевик (Bolshevik)	аг Бальшавік (Balshavik)	3589	3171
д Боровцы	в Бараўцы	49	53
аг Вишнёвка (Vishnyovka)	аг Вішнёўка (Vishnyowka)	1030	1069
д Дофаренция	в Дафарэнцыя	37	64
д Дубовляны	в Дубаўляны	259	244
д Зацень	в Зацань	131	217
д Касынь	в Касынь	86	140
д Лапоровичи	в Лапаравічы	226	293
д Нелидовичи	в Нялідавічы	89	138
д Осово	в Восава	71	54
д Паперня	в Паперня (Papyernya)	506	444
д Пильница	в Пільніца	66	121
д Приморье	в Прымор'е	94	133
д Рахманьки	в Рахманькі	172	136
д Селюты	в Сялюты	38	29
д Сёмков Городок	в Сёмкаў Гарадок	193	192
аг Сёмково	аг Сёмкава (Syomkava)	1579	2399
д Цна	в Цна	66	49
д Цнянка	в Цнянка	814	1025
д Чижовка	в Чыжоўка	30	27
д Чучаны	в Чучаны	44	64
д Якубовичи	в Якубовічы	57	69
