= Kromy, Oryol Oblast =

Kromy Кромы
- Urban-type settlement
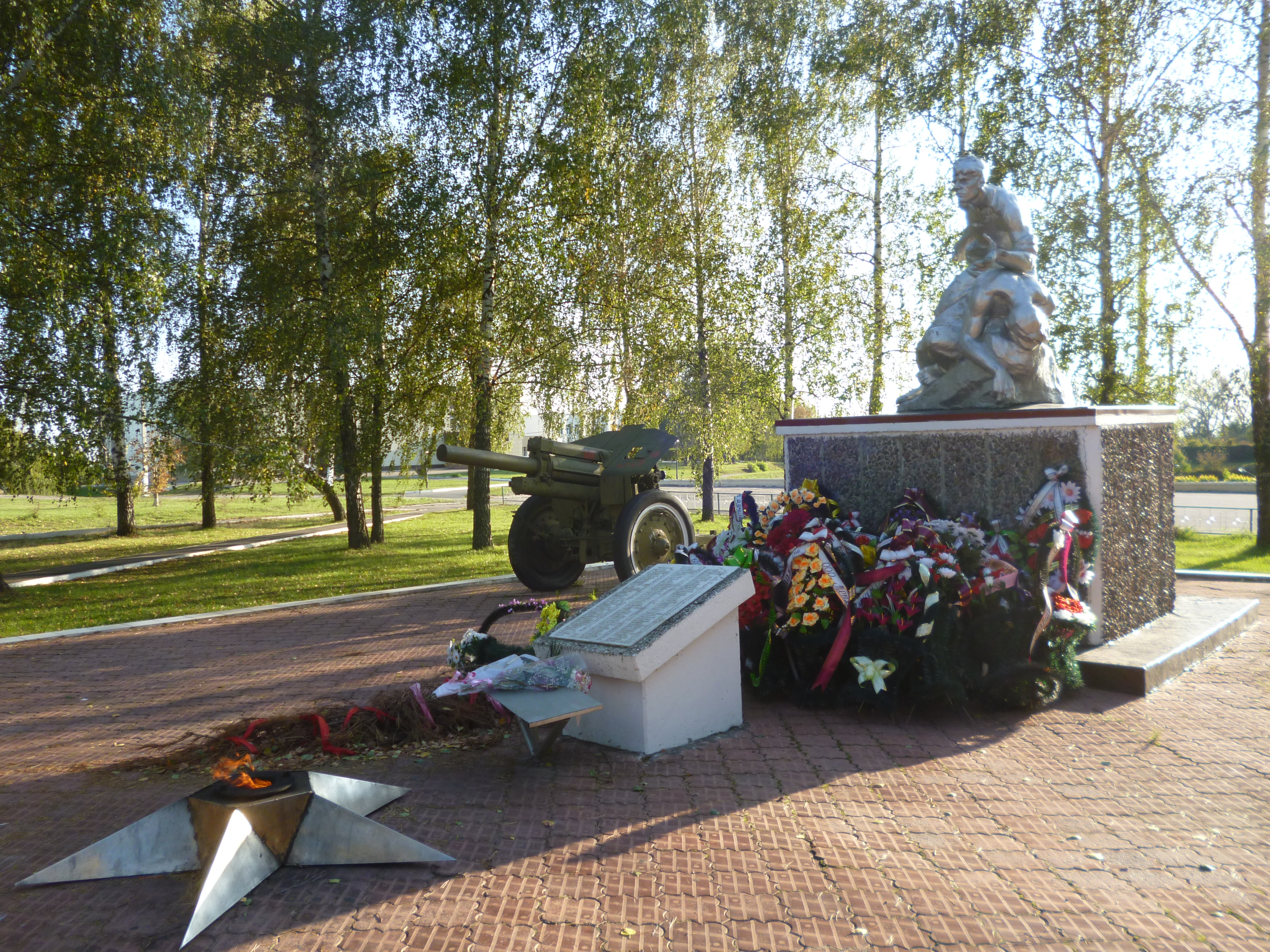

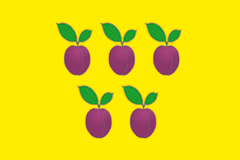
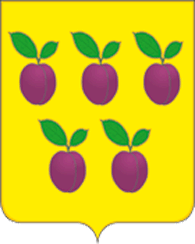
- Flag Coat of arms
- Interactive map of Kromy
- Location of Kromy Kromy (European Russia) Kromy (Russia)
- Coordinates: 52°41′23″N 35°46′03″E
- Country: Russia
- Federal subject: Oryol Oblast
- Administrative district: Kromskoy District
- Elevation: 170 m (560 ft)

Population (2010 Census)
  - Total: 6,733
  - Estimate (2023): 7,017 (+4.2%)
- Time zone: UTC+3 (MSK)
- Postal code: 303200
- Dialing code: +7 48643
- OKTMO ID: 54625151051

Kromy (Russian: Кромы) is an urban locality (an urban-type settlement) and the administrative center of Kromskoy District of Oryol Oblast, Russia, located on the Kroma River (a tributary of the Oka) 36 kilometers (22 mi) southwest of Oryol. Population: 6,733 (2010 census); 7,194 (2002 census); 7,082 (1989 Soviet census).

== History ==
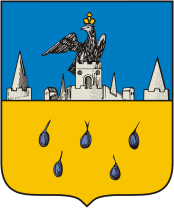
The historical coat of arms

It was first chronicled in 1147, the same year as Moscow. It was a seat of one of the Upper Oka Principalities of the 15th century. In 1595, it was fortified by Boris Godunov in order to defend the Grand Duchy of Moscow from the Tatar raids. During the Time of Troubles, it gained nationwide renown as a major stronghold of the rebels such as the Don Cossacks led by Andrey Korela and Ivan Bolotnikov's generals.

Kromy was an important agricultural center throughout the 19th century. A railway from Moscow to Kharkov reached it in the 1850s. A large Neoclassical cathedral dates from this period. Kromy was contested by Anton Denikin's forces and the Red Army in October 1919.

Kromy lost its town status and was demoted to an urban-type settlement in 1924.

During the German occupation in World War II, in 1943, the occupiers operated the Stalag 397 prisoner-of-war camp in Kromy for some 300–600 POWs.
