= Agibalovo =

Agibalovo (Russian: Агибалово) is the name of several rural localities in Russia:

- Agibalovo, Sudbishchensky Selsoviet, Novoderevenkovsky District, Oryol Oblast, a village in Sudbishchensky Selsoviet of Novoderevenkovsky District in Oryol Oblast
- Agibalovo, Surovsky Selsoviet, Novoderevenkovsky District, Oryol Oblast, a village in Surovsky Selsoviet of Novoderevenkovsky District in Oryol Oblast
- Agibalovo, Smolensk Oblast, a village in Agibalovskoye Rural Settlement of Kholm-Zhirkovsky District in Smolensk Oblast
