= Setenyovo =

Rural locality in Pokrovsky District, Oryol Oblast, Russia

Setenyovo (Russian: Сетенёво) is a village (selo) in Pokrovsky District of Oryol Oblast, Russia.
