= Grunets =

- Interactive map of Grunets
- Location of Grunets
- Coordinates: 53°07′30″N 37°16′17″E
- Country: Russia
- Federal subject: Oryol Oblast

Population
  - Estimate (2010): 1 )
- Time zone: UTC+3 (MSK)
- Postal code: 303585
- OKTMO ID: 54626420111

Grunets (Russian: Грунец) is a village in Korsakovsky District of Oryol Oblast, Russia.
