= Syomkava =

Agrotown in Minsk Region, Belarus

Syomkava Сёмкава (Belarusian) Сёмково (Russian)
- Agrotown
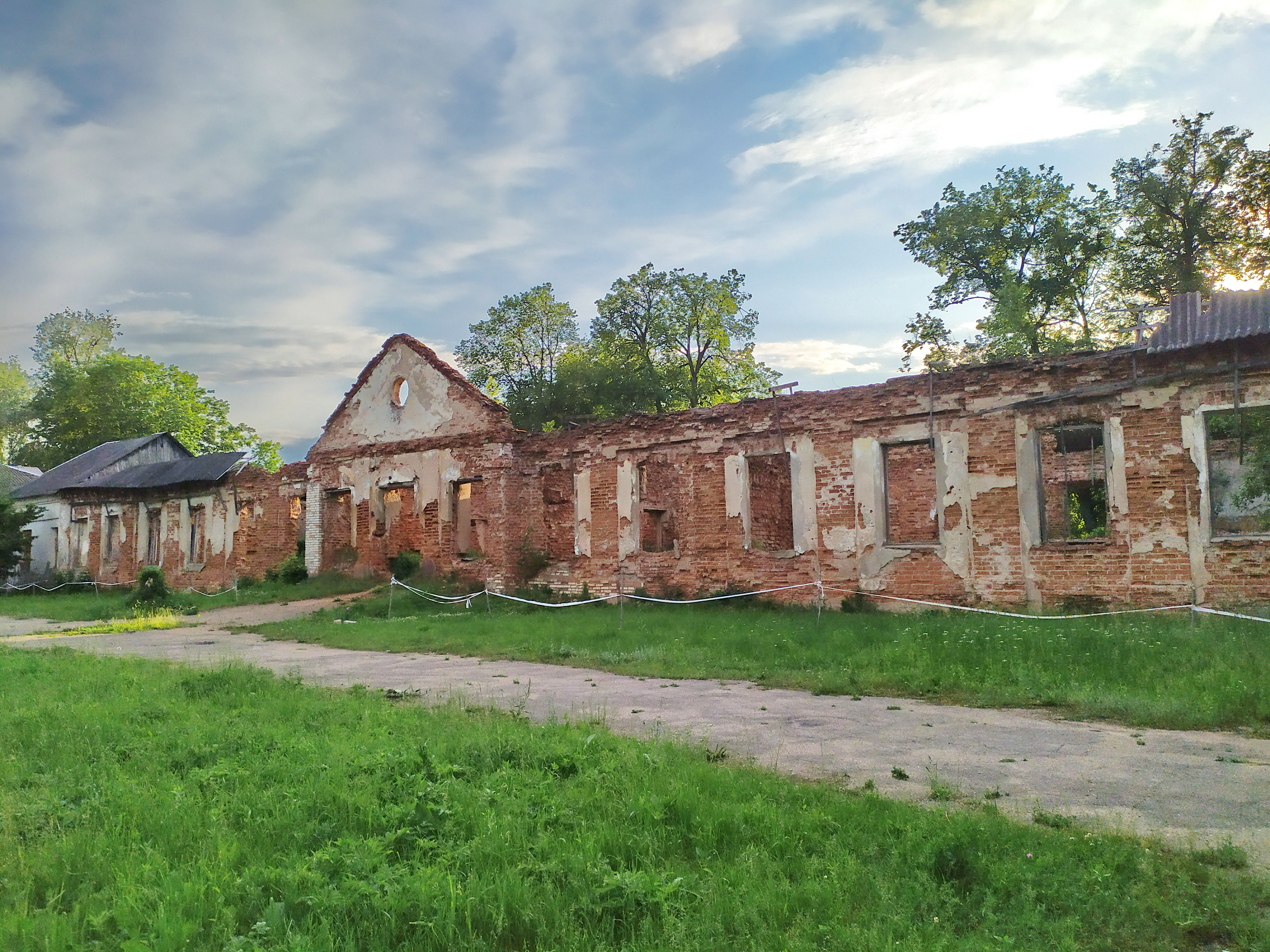

- Location within Belarus
- Coordinates: 54°00′59″N 27°25′55″E
- Country: Belarus
- Region: Minsk Region
- District: Minsk District

Population (2010)
  - Total: 1,625
- Time zone: UTC+3 (MSK)

Syomkava (Belarusian: Сёмкава, romanized: Siomkava; Russian: Сёмково, romanized: Syomkovo) is an agrotown in Minsk District, Minsk Region, Belarus. It is administratively part of Papyernya rural council. It is located 16 kilometres (9.9 mi) northwest of the capital Minsk. In 2001, it had a population of 1,461. In 2010, it had a population of 1,625.
