= Kritovo =

Rural locality in Pokrovsky District, Oryol Oblast, Russia

Coordinates: 52°43′05″N 36°41′22″E

Kritovo (Russian: Критово) is a village in Pokrovsky District of Oryol Oblast, Russia.
