= Venderevo =

Coordinates: 52°32′38″N 36°01′12″E

Venderevo Вендерево
- Village
- Interactive map of Venderevo
- Country: Russia
- Oblast: Oryol
- Raion: Kromskoy

Area
  - Total: 0.321 km^{2} (0.124 sq mi)

Venderevo (Russian: Вендерево) is a village (selo) in Kromskoy District of Oryol Oblast, Russia.
