= Khomutovo, Novoderevenkovsky District, Oryol Oblast =

Khomutovo Хомутово
- Urban-type settlement
- Interactive map of Khomutovo
- Location of Khomutovo Khomutovo (Oryol Oblast)
- Coordinates: 52.8540°N 37.4473°E
- Country: Russia
- Federal subject: Oryol Oblast
- Administrative district: Novoderevenkovsky District

Population (2010 Census)
  - Total: 4,231
  - Estimate (2023): 3,874 (−8.4%)
- Time zone: UTC+3 (MSK)
- Postal code: 303620
- OKTMO ID: 54639151051

Khomutovo (Russian: Хомутово) is an urban locality (an urban-type settlement) in Novoderevenkovsky District of Oryol Oblast, Russia. Population: 4,231 (2010 census); 4,710 (2002 census); 4,753 (1989 Soviet census).
