= Nizhny Turovets =

Rural locality in Pokrovsky District, Oryol Oblast, Russia

Coordinates: 52°40′N 37°02′E

Nizhny Turovets (Russian: Нижний Туровец) is a village in Pokrovsky District of Oryol Oblast, Russia.
