= Pokrovskoye, Pokrovsky District, Oryol Oblast =

Pokrovskoye Покровское
- Urban-type settlement
- Interactive map of Pokrovskoye
- Location of Pokrovskoye Pokrovskoye (Oryol Oblast)
- Coordinates: 52.6079°N 36.8664°E
- Country: Russia
- Federal subject: Oryol Oblast
- Administrative district: Pokrovsky District
- Elevation: 200 m (660 ft)

Population (2010 Census)
  - Total: 4,432
  - Estimate (2023): 3,751 (−15.4%)
- Time zone: UTC+3 (MSK)
- Postal code: 303170
- OKTMO ID: 54650151051

Pokrovskoye (Russian: Покро́вское) is an urban locality (an urban-type settlement) in Pokrovsky District of Oryol Oblast, Russia. Population: 4,432 (2010 census); 4,628 (2002 census); 4,301 (1989 Soviet census).
