= Antonina Sofronova =

Russian artist (1892–1966)

Antonina Fedorovna Sofronova
- Born: 14 March 1892; Oryol Governorate, Russian Empire
- Died: 14 May 1966 (aged 74); Moscow, Russian SFSR

Antonina Fedorovna Sofronova (14 March 1892 – 14 May 1966) was a Russian artist and illustrator.

== Biography ==
Sofronova was born in Droskovo, Oryol Governorate. She went to the Girls' Commercial College in Kyiv, finishing in 1909 when she moved to Moscow to study under the direction of Fedor Ivanovich Rerberg from 1910 until 1913 when she changed to work with Ilya Mashkov in the Moscow School of Art. Sofronova took part in the Jack of Diamonds, Mir iskusstva and “Moscow Association of Artists” exhibitions from 1914 to 1917. Sofronova married painter Guenrikh Blumenfeld in 1915. She became a teacher at the State Art Studios in Orel, between 1919 and 1920, and Tver, from 1920 to 1921. In 1923 she returned to Moscow where she became a member of IZO.

In 1929 she became a member of the group "13", a group of Russian impressionist artists. However by 1931 the group was coming under increasingly negative attitudes and they stopped exhibiting. All such groups were abolished in 1932. Sofronova was also subject to criticism from the government and mostly was not allowed to exhibit.

In the 1910s, Sofronova created figurative paintings before moving to more Expressionist, abstract styles. In the 1920s she created Expressionist landscapes and Cubist portraits. Her Moscow Street Types were a series of watercolors and ink drawings in the mid twenties which juxtaposed sunflowers and the homeless. She worked as a book illustrator as well and experimented with constructivist styles. Sofronova died in Moscow in 1966.
