= Pechki, Oryol Oblast =

Rural locality in Soskovsky District, Oryol Oblast, Russia

Coordinates: 52°39′33″N 35°17′53″E

Pechki (Russian: Пе́чки) is a rural locality (a selo) in Soskovsky District of Oryol Oblast, Russia.
