= Domny =

- Interactive map of Domny
- Location of Domny
- Coordinates: 52°55′45″N 37°38′35″E
- Country: Russia
- Federal subject: Oryol Oblast

Population
  - Estimate (2010): 40 )
- Time zone: UTC+3 (MSK)
- Postal code: 303643
- OKTMO ID: 54639422111

Domny (Russian: Домны) is a village in Novoderevenkovsky District of Oryol Oblast, Russia.
