= Zelva district =

District of Grodno Region, Belarus

Zelva district Зэльвенскі раён (Belarusian) Зельвенский район (Russian)
- District
- Flag Coat of arms

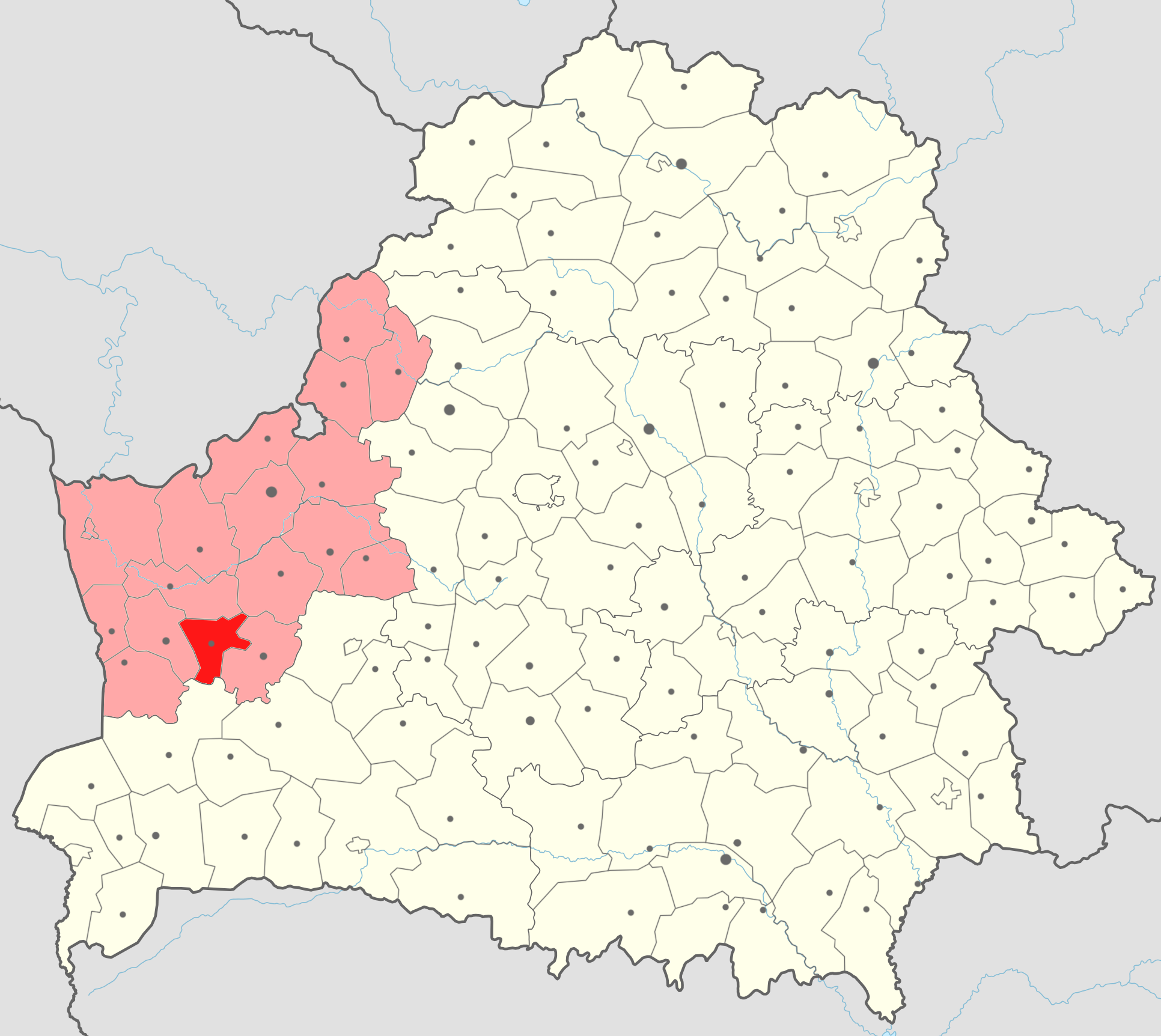
- Coordinates: 53°09′N 24°49′E
- Country: Belarus
- Region: Grodno region
- Administrative center: Zelva

Area
  - District: 869.69 km^{2} (335.79 sq mi)

Population (2024)
  - District: 12,851
  - Density: 14.777/km^{2} (38.271/sq mi)
  - Urban: 6,296
  - Rural: 6,555
- Time zone: UTC+3 (MSK)

Zelva district or Zeĺva district (Belarusian: Зэльвенскі раён; Russian: Зельвенский район) is a district (raion) of Grodno region in Belarus. The administrative center is Zelva. As of 2024, it has a population of 12,851.

== Notable residents ==
- Vasil Zacharka (1877–1943), Belarusian statesman and president of the Rada of the Belarusian Democratic Republic
- Raphael Lemkin (1900–1959), drafter of the Genocide Convention
