= Korsakovo, Korsakovsky District, Oryol Oblast =

Rural locality in Oryol Oblast, Russia

Korsakovo Корсаково
- Selo
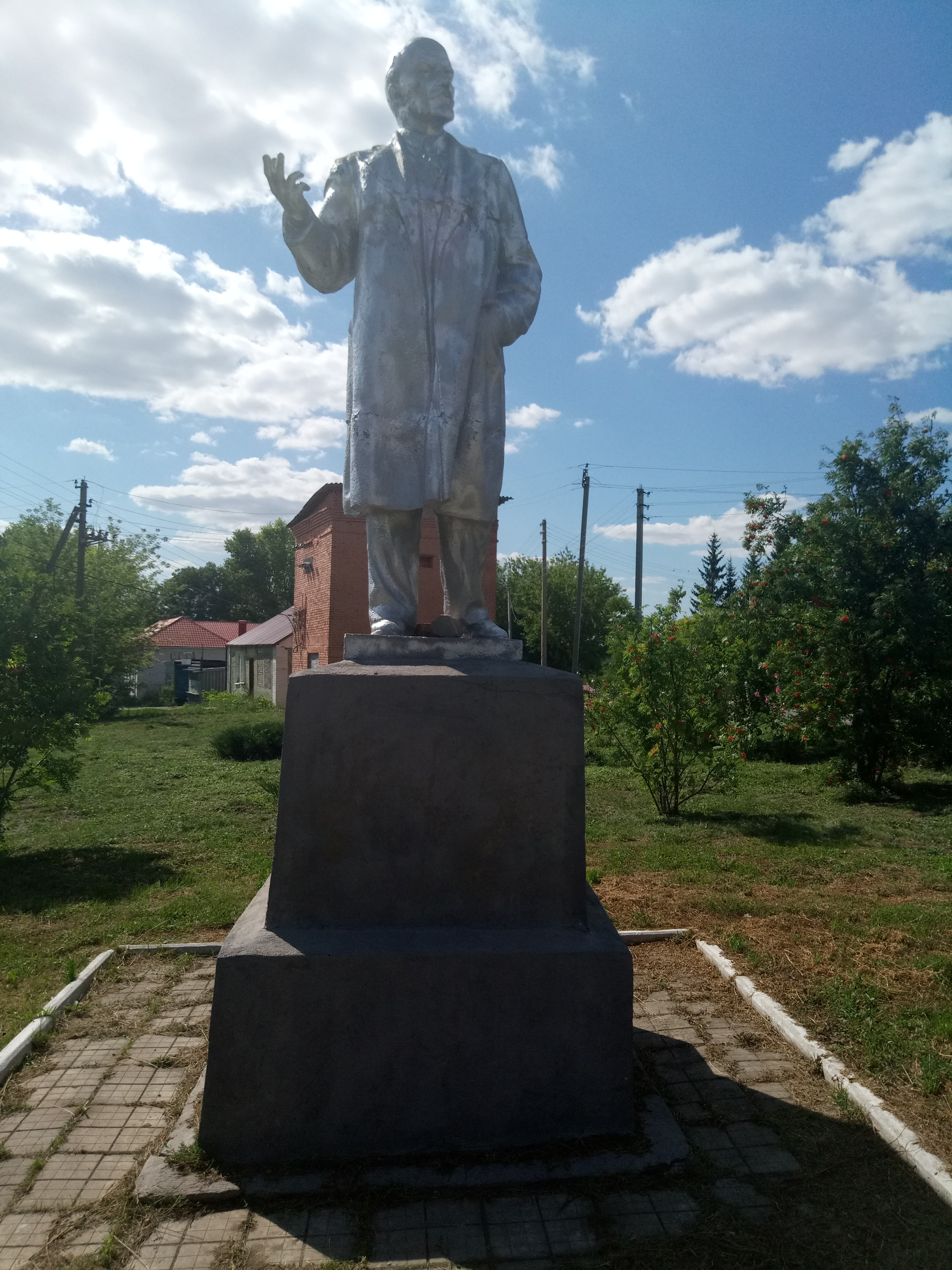
- Statue of Lenin at the village
- Interactive map of Korsakovo
- Location of Korsakovo Korsakovo (Oryol Oblast)
- Coordinates: 53°16′02″N 37°21′34″E
- Country: Russia
- Federal subject: Oryol Oblast
- Administrative district: Korsakovsky District
- First mentioned: 1861

Population (2010 Census)
  - Total: 1,452
  - Estimate (2010): 1,452 (0%)

Administrative status
  - Capital of: Korsakovsky District, Korsakovsky Selsoviet

Municipal status
  - Municipal district: Korsakovsky Municipal District
  - Rural settlement: Korsakovskoye Selsoviet Rural Settlement
  - Capital of: Korsakovsky Municipal District, Korsakovskoye Selsoviet Rural Settlement
- Time zone: UTC+3 (MSK)
- Postal code: 303580
- OKTMO ID: 54626410101

Korsakovo (Russian: Корсаково) is a rural locality (a selo) and the administrative center of Korsakovsky District, Oryol Oblast, Russia. Population: 1,452 (2010 census); 1,485 (2002 census);
