= Fyodorovka, Oryol Oblast =

- Interactive map of Fyodorovka, Oryol Oblast
- Location of Fyodorovka, Oryol Oblast
- Coordinates: 52°31′30″N 36°47′02″E
- Country: Russia
- Federal subject: Oryol Oblast

Population
  - Estimate (2010): 311 )
- Time zone: UTC+3 (MSK)
- Postal code: 303176
- OKTMO ID: 54650407101

Fyodorovka (Russian: Фёдоровка) is a village (selo) in Pokrovsky District of Oryol Oblast, Russia.
