= Papyernya =

Village in Minsk Region, Belarus

Papyernya Паперня
- Village
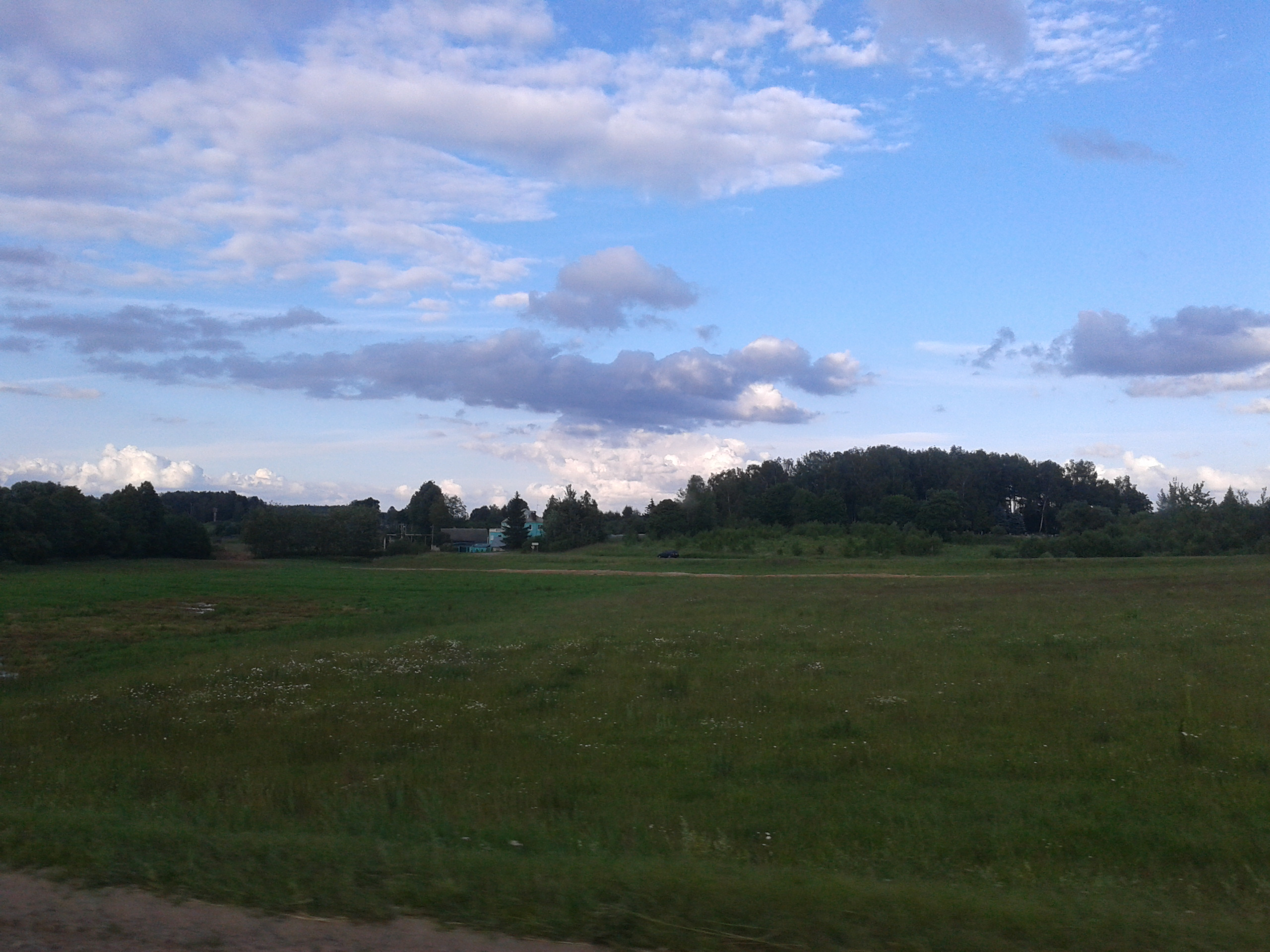

- Location within Belarus
- Coordinates: 54°02′16″N 27°33′55″E
- Country: Belarus
- Region: Minsk Region
- District: Minsk District

Population (2010)
  - Total: 486
- Time zone: UTC+3 (MSK)

Papyernya (Belarusian: Паперня, romanized: Papiernia; Russian: Паперня, romanized: Papernya) is a village in Minsk District, Minsk Region, Belarus. It is administratively part of Papyernya rural council. It is located about eight kilometres (five miles) from the Minsk Ring Road, north of the capital Minsk. In 2010, it had a population of 486.
