= Yelkovo =

Village in Russia

Coordinates: 52°43′34″N 35°20′03″E

Yelkovo (Russian: Ельково) is a village in Soskovsky District of Oryol Oblast, Russia.
