= Lebyodki =

Rural locality in Dolzhansky District, Oryol Oblast, Russia

Coordinates: 52°09′08″N 37°21′13″E

Lebyodki (Russian: Лебёдки) is a village in Dolzhansky District of Oryol Oblast, Russia.
