= Balshavik, Minsk region =

Agrotown in Minsk Region, Belarus

Balshavik Бальшавік (Belarusian) Большевик (Russian)
- Agrotown
- Location within Belarus
- Coordinates: 54°00′11″N 27°33′48″E
- Country: Belarus
- Region: Minsk Region
- District: Minsk District
- Time zone: UTC+3 (MSK)

Balshavik (Belarusian: Бальшавік, romanized: Baĺšavik; Russian: Большевик, romanized: Bolshevik) is an agrotown in Minsk District, Minsk Region, Belarus. It serves as the administrative center of Papiernya selsoviet.
