= Ogibalovo, Vologodsky District, Vologda Oblast =

Ogibalovo Огибалово
- Village
- Location within Vologda Oblast Location within Russia
- Coordinates: 59°07′N 39°22′E
- Country: Russia
- Region: Vologda Oblast
- District: Vologodsky District
- Time zone: UTC+3:00

Ogibalovo (Russian: Огибалово) is a rural locality (a village) in Staroselskoye Rural Settlement, Vologodsky District, Vologda Oblast, Russia. The population was 8 as of 2002.

== Geography ==
Ogibalovo is located 35 km southwest of Vologda (the district's administrative centre) by road. Dorki is the nearest rural locality.
