= Petrushkovo =

Rural locality in Shablykinsky District, Russia

Coordinates: 52°50′18″N 35°03′57″E

Petrushkovo (Russian: Петрушково) is a village (selo) in Shablykinsky District of Oryol Oblast, Russia.
