= Navesnoye =

Rural locality in Livensky District, Oryol Oblast, Russia

Coordinates: 52°17′N 37°57′E

Navesnoye (Russian: Навесное) is a village (selo) in Livensky District of Oryol Oblast, Russia.
