= Mokhovoye, Zalegoshchensky District, Oryol Oblast =

Rural locality in Zalegoshchensky District, Oryol Oblast, Russia

Coordinates: 52°56′44″N 36°34′29″E

Mokhovoye (Russian: Моховое) is a settlement in Zalegoshchensky District, Oryol Oblast, the administrative center of the Mokhovskoye Rural Settlement. It had a population of 904 according to the 2010 Census.
