= Krasnaya Zarya, Republic of Bashkortostan =

Krasnaya Zarya Красная Заря
- Village
- Location within Bashkortostan Location within Russia
- Coordinates: 54°14′N 54°19′E
- Country: Russia
- Region: Bashkortostan
- District: Belebeyevsky District
- Time zone: UTC+5:00

Krasnaya Zarya (Russian: Красная Заря) is a rural locality (a village) in Usen-Ivanovsky Selsoviet, Belebeyevsky District, Bashkortostan, Russia. The population was 39 as of 2010. There is 1 street.

== Geography ==
Krasnaya Zarya is located 27 km northeast of Belebey (the district's administrative centre) by road. Sosnovy Bor is the nearest rural locality.
