= Krasnaya Zarya, Vologda Oblast =

Krasnaya Zarya Красная Заря
- Settlement
- Location within Vologda Oblast Location within Russia
- Coordinates: 59°38′N 37°07′E
- Country: Russia
- Region: Vologda Oblast
- District: Kaduysky District
- Time zone: UTC+3:00

Krasnaya Zarya (Russian: Красная Заря) is a rural locality (a settlement) in Nikolskoye Rural Settlement, Kaduysky District, Vologda Oblast, Russia. The population was 9 as of 2002.

== Geography ==
Krasnaya Zarya is located 64 km north of Kaduy (the district's administrative centre) by road. Danilkovo is the nearest rural locality.
