= Krasnaya Zarya, Volgograd Oblast =

Krasnaya Zarya Красная Заря
- Khutor
- Location within Volgograd Oblast Location within Russia
- Coordinates: 50°24′N 42°51′E
- Country: Russia
- Region: Volgograd Oblast
- District: Novoanninsky District
- Time zone: UTC+4:00

Krasnaya Zarya (Russian: Красная Заря) is a rural locality (a khutor) in Panfilovskoye Rural Settlement, Novoanninsky District, Volgograd Oblast, Russia. The population was 296 as of 2010. There are 6 streets.

== Geography ==
Krasnaya Zarya is located 240 km from Volgograd, 28 km southeast of Novoanninsky (the district's administrative centre) by road. Panfilovo is the nearest rural locality.
