= Ogibalovo, Vozhegodsky District, Vologda Oblast =

Ogibalovo Огибалово
- Village
- Location within Vologda Oblast Location within Russia
- Coordinates: 60°33′N 39°40′E
- Country: Russia
- Region: Vologda Oblast
- District: Vozhegodsky District
- Time zone: UTC+3:00

Ogibalovo Church

Ogibalovo (Russian: Огибалово) is a rural locality (a village) in Tiginskoye Rural Settlement, Vozhegodsky District, Vologda Oblast, Russia. The population was 97 as of 2002.

== Geography ==
Ogibalovo is located 39 km northwest of Vozhega (the district's administrative centre) by road. Kurshiyevskaya is the nearest rural locality.
