= Korsakovo, Republic of Buryatia =

Korsakovo Корсаково
- Selo
- Location within Republic of Buryatia Location within Russia
- Coordinates: 52°15′N 106°37′E
- Country: Russia
- Region: Republic of Buryatia
- District: Kabansky District
- Time zone: UTC+8:00

Korsakovo (Russian: Корсаково) is a rural locality (a selo) in Kabansky District, Republic of Buryatia, Russia. The population was 635 as of 2010. There are 7 streets.

== Geography ==
Korsakovo is located 51 km north of Kabansk (the district's administrative centre) by road. Kudara is the nearest rural locality.
