= Zelva =

Zelva Зэльва (Belarusian) Зельва (Russian)
- Urban-type settlement
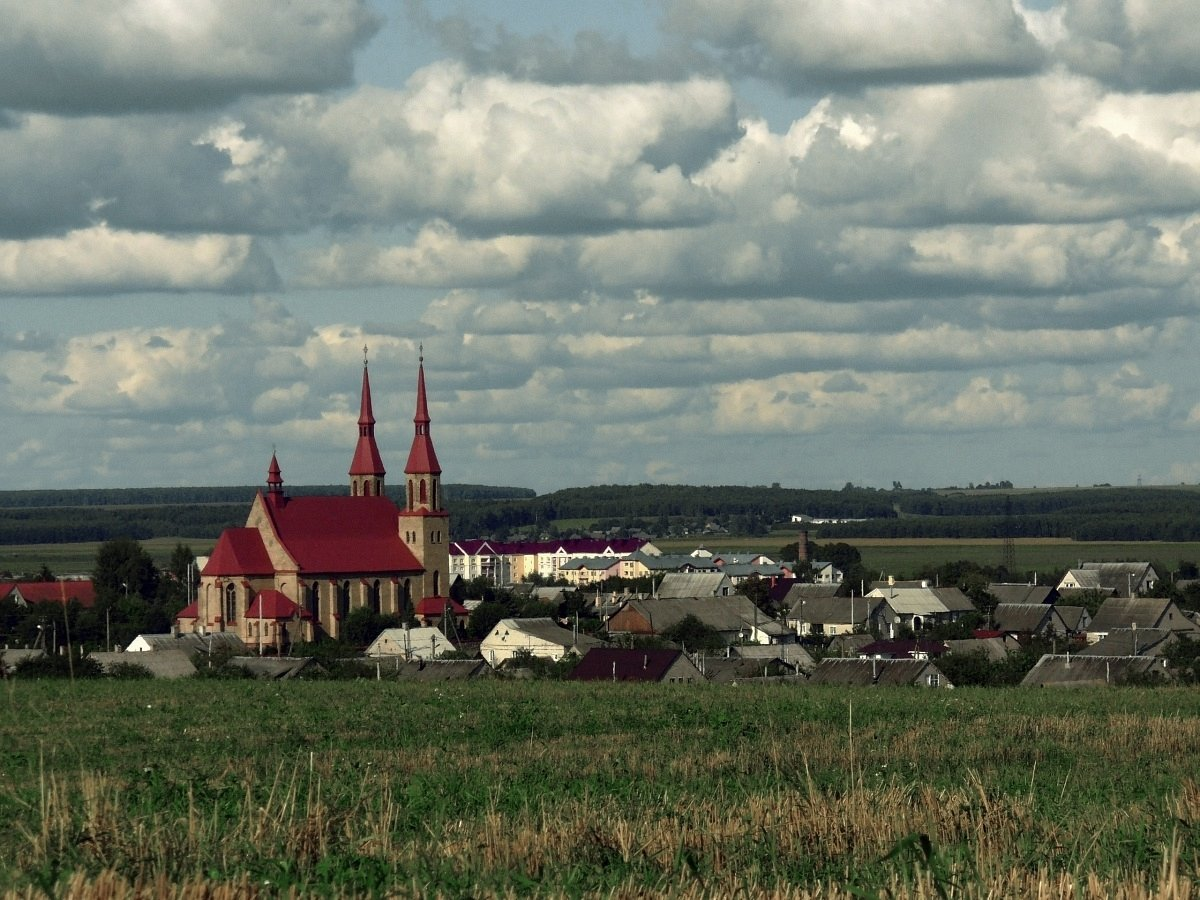

- Flag Seal

- Location within Belarus
- Coordinates: 53°09′N 24°49′E
- Country: Belarus
- Region: Grodno Region
- District: Zelva District
- First mentioned: 1258

Area
  - Total: 15 km^{2} (5.8 sq mi)
- Elevation: 138 m (453 ft)

Population (2025)
  - Total: 6,193
- Time zone: UTC+3 (MSK)
- Postal codes: 231930, 231939, 231940
- Area code: +375-1564

Zelva (Note: Belarusian: Зэ́льва, romanized: Zeĺva; Russian: Зе́льва; Polish: Zelwa; Yiddish: זעלווא.) is an urban-type settlement in Grodno Region, in western Belarus. It serves as the administrative center of Zelva District. It is situated by the Zelvyanka River. As of 2025, it has a population of 6,193.

== History ==
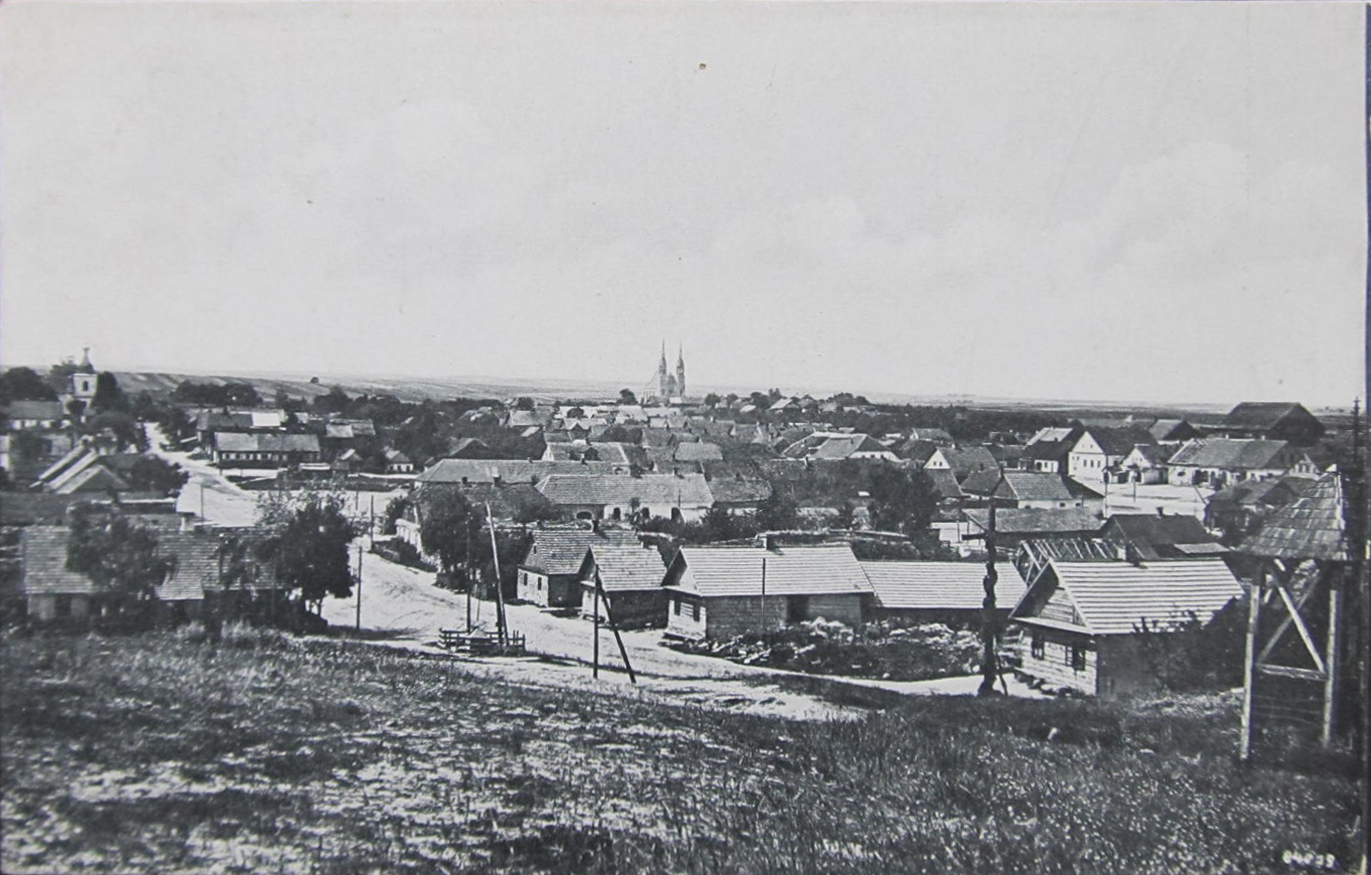
Panorama from the 1910s

Initially Zelwa was a private possession of various nobles, by the mid-16th century it became a possession of the Polish Crown, and in the 17th century it became again a private possession of nobility, including the Sapieha, Połubiński, Radziwiłł, Jarmołowicz and Konarzewski families. In 1720 weekly markets and annual fairs were established. In 1739 a Piarist monastery was founded.

In the interbellum, it was administratively located in the Wołkowysk County in the Białystok Voivodeship of Poland. According to the 1921 census, the population was 63.4% Jewish, 31.1% Polish and 5.3% Belarusian.

Following the joint German-Soviet invasion of Poland in September 1939, it was first occupied by the Soviet Union until 1 July 1941, and then by Nazi Germany until 12 July 1944 and administered as a part of Bezirk Bialystok. When the Germans entered the town, they killed 40 to 50 Jewish men and kept the Jews of the town imprisoned in a ghetto in very harsh conditions. In November 1942, the Jews were deported and murdered at the Treblinka extermination camp.
