= Fyodorovka, Ufimsky District, Republic of Bashkortostan =

Village in Ufimsky District, Russia

Coordinates: 54.5711°N 55.9630°E

Fyodorovka (Russian: Фёдоровка, Bashkir: Фёдоровка) is a village in Ufimsky District, Russia.

== Population ==
National composition

According to the Russian Census of 2002, prevailing nationalities — are Tatars (37%) and Bashkirs (49%).
