= Sverdlovskoye =

Sverdlovskoye Свердловское
- Selo
- Location within Altai Krai Location within Russia
- Coordinates: 53°19′N 79°40′E
- Country: Russia
- Region: Altai Krai
- District: Khabarsky District
- Time zone: UTC+7:00

Sverdlovskoye (Russian: Свердловское) is a rural locality (a selo) and the administrative center of Sverdlovsky Selsoviet, Khabarsky District, Altai Krai, Russia. The population was 713 as of 2013. It was founded in 1900. There are 5 streets.

== Geography ==
Sverdlovskoye is located 37 km south of Khabary (the district's administrative centre) by road. Dobrovolshchina is the nearest rural locality.
