= Krasnaya Zarya, Vladimir Oblast =

Krasnaya Zarya Красная Заря
- Settlement
- Location within Vladimir Oblast Location within Russia
- Coordinates: 55°12′N 41°04′E
- Country: Russia
- Region: Vladimir Oblast
- District: Gus-Khrustalny District
- Time zone: UTC+3:00

Krasnaya Zarya (Russian: Красная Заря) is a rural locality (a settlement) in Kupreyevskoye Rural Settlement, Gus-Khrustalny District, Vladimir Oblast, Russia. The population was 17 as of 2010.

== Geography ==
Krasnaya Zarya is located on the right bank of the Kolp River, 70 km southeast of Gus-Khrustalny (the district's administrative centre) by road. Kolp is the nearest rural locality.
