= Korsakovsky District =

Location of Oryol Oblast in Russia

Location of Sakhalin Oblast in Russia

Korsakovsky District is the name of several administrative and municipal districts in Russia:

- Korsakovsky District, Oryol Oblast, an administrative and municipal district of Oryol Oblast
- Korsakovsky District, Sakhalin Oblast, an administrative district of Sakhalin Oblast

== See also ==
- Korsakov (disambiguation)
