= Novoderevenkovsky District =

Novoderevenkovsky District Новодеревеньковский район
- District
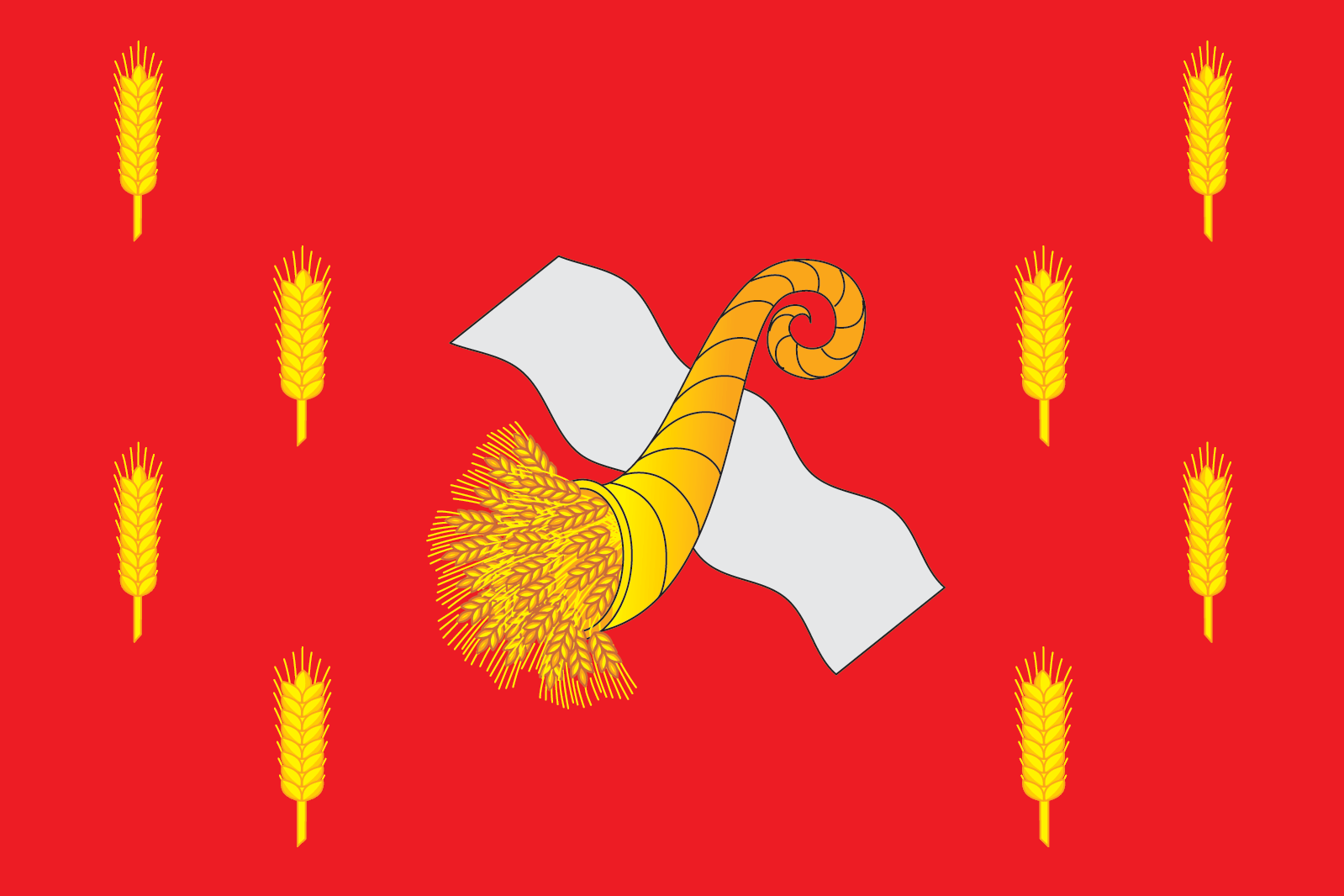
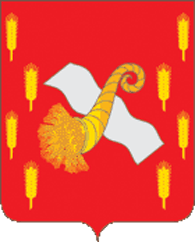
- Flag Coat of arms
- Location of Novoderevenkovsky District in Oryol Oblast
- Coordinates: 52°51′23″N 37°26′35″E
- Country: Russia
- Federal subject: Oryol Oblast
- Established: 18 January 1935
- Administrative center: Khomutovo

Area
  - Total: 1,024.9 km^{2} (395.7 sq mi)

Population (2010 Census)
  - Total: 10,704
  - Density: 10.444/km^{2} (27.050/sq mi)
  - Urban: 39.5%
  - Rural: 60.5%

Administrative structure
  - Administrative divisions: 1 Urban-type settlements, 7 Selsoviets
  - Inhabited localities: 1 urban-type settlements, 84 rural localities

Municipal structure
  - Municipally incorporated as: Novoderevenkovsky Municipal District
  - Municipal divisions: 1 urban settlements, 7 rural settlements
- Time zone: UTC+3 (MSK)
- OKTMO ID: 54639000
- Website: http://adminnovod.ru/

Novoderevenkovsky District (Russian: Новодеревеньковский райо́н) is an administrative and municipal district (raion), one of the twenty-four in Oryol Oblast, Russia. It is located in the northeast of the oblast. The area of the district is 1,024.9 square kilometers (395.7 sq mi). Its administrative center is the urban locality (an urban-type settlement) of Khomutovo. Population: 10,704 (2010 Census); 13,486 (2002 Census); 14,672 (1989 Soviet census). The population of Khomutovo accounts for 39.5% of the district's total population.

== Notable residents ==
- Grigoriy Myasoyedov (1834–1911), Realist painter, born in Pankovo

== See also ==
- Domny
