= Droskovo =

- Interactive map of Droskovo
- Location of Droskovo
- Coordinates: 52°29′N 37°05′E
- Country: Russia
- Federal subject: Oryol Oblast

Population
  - Estimate (2010): 751 )
- Time zone: UTC+3 (MSK)
- Postal code: 303180
- OKTMO ID: 54650416101

Droskovo (Russian: Дросково) is a village (selo) in Pokrovsky District of Oryol Oblast, Russia. It had a population of 751 according to the 2010 Census.

== Notable people ==
- Antonina Fedorovna Sofronova (1892 – 1966) was a Russian artist
