= Soskovo, Oryol Oblast =

Rural locality in Oryol Oblast, Russia

Soskovo Сосково
- Selo
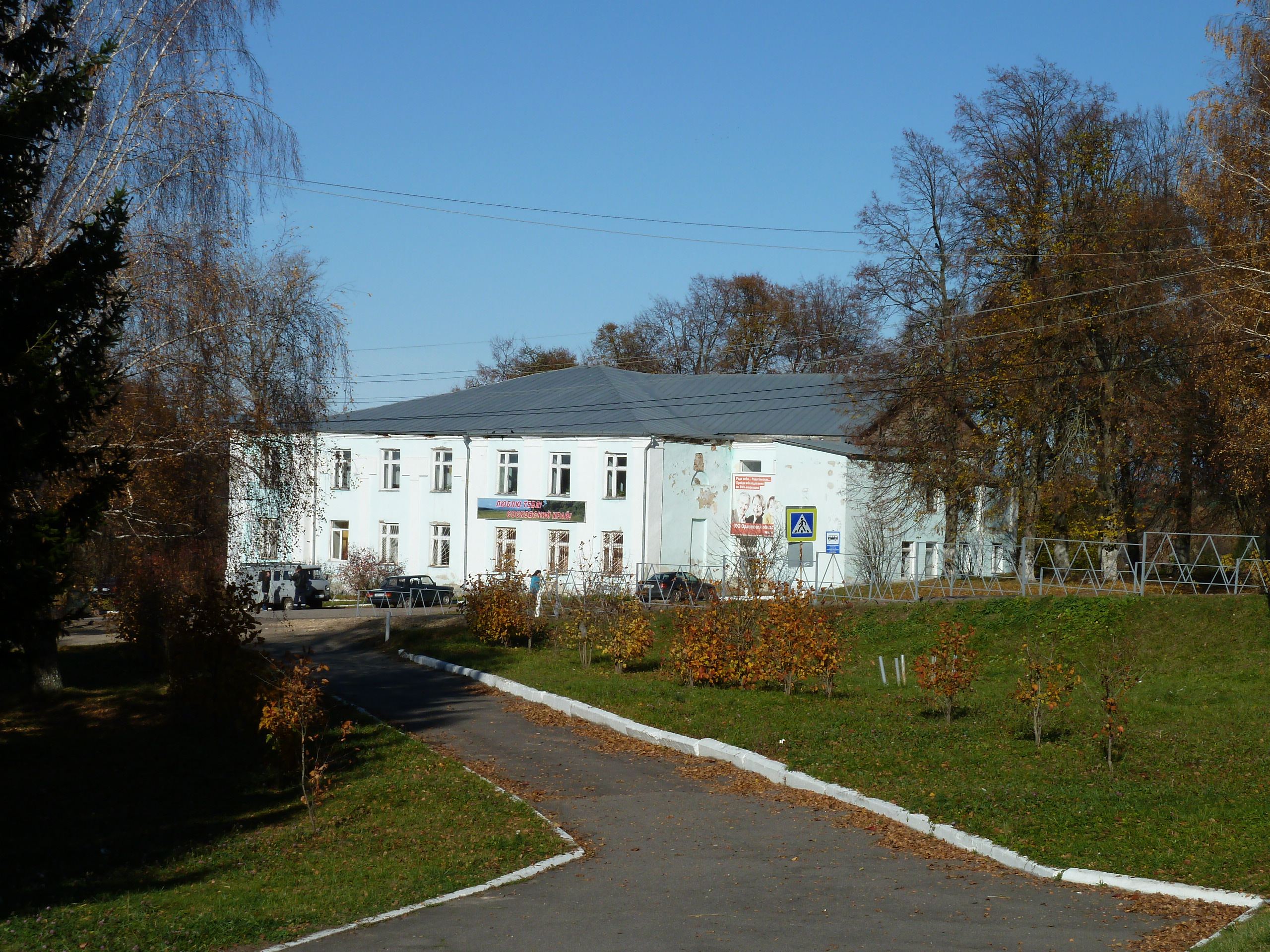
- Village hall and House of culture
- Interactive map of Soskovo
- Location of Soskovo Soskovo (Oryol Oblast)
- Coordinates: 52°44′56″N 35°23′11″E
- Country: Russia
- Federal subject: Oryol Oblast
- Administrative district: Soskovsky District
- First mentioned: 1734

Population (2010 Census)
  - Total: 1,794
  - Estimate (2010): 1,794 (0%)

Administrative status
  - Capital of: Soskovsky District, Soskovskoye Selsoviet

Municipal status
  - Municipal district: Soskovsky Municipal District
  - Rural settlement: Soskovskoye Selsoviet Rural Settlement
  - Capital of: Soskovsky Municipal District, Soskovskoye Selsoviet Rural Settlement
- Time zone: UTC+3 (MSK)
- Postal code: 303980
- Dialing code: +7 48665
- OKTMO ID: 54653425101

Soskovo (Russian: Сосково) is a rural locality (a selo) and the administrative center of Soskovsky District, Oryol Oblast, Russia. Population: 1,794 (2010 census); 2,122 (2002 census); 1,759 (1989 Soviet census).
