= Krasnaya Zarya, Krasnozorensky District, Oryol Oblast =

Rural locality in Oryol Oblast, Russia

Krasnaya Zarya Красная Заря
- Selo
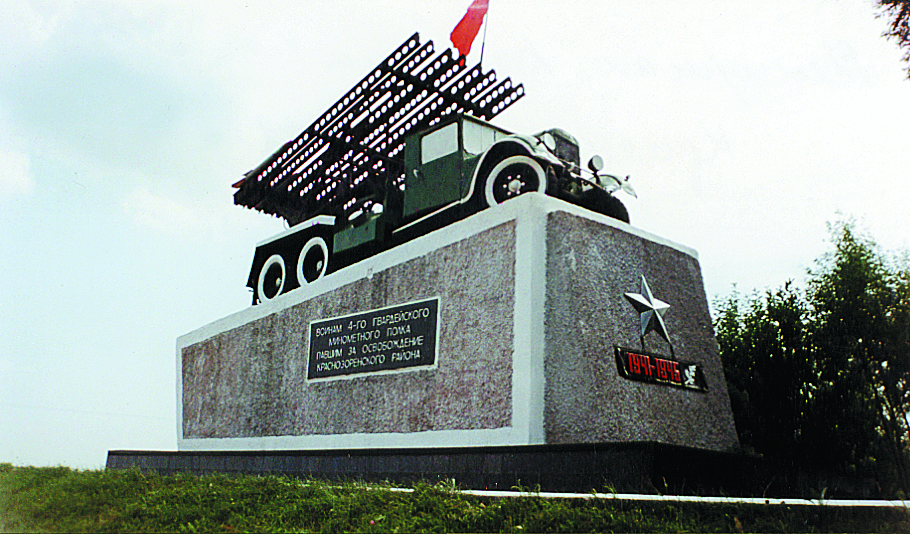
- Katyusha statue at the village
- Interactive map of Krasnaya Zarya
- Location of Krasnaya Zarya Krasnaya Zarya (Oryol Oblast)
- Coordinates: 52°47′02″N 37°40′52″E
- Country: Russia
- Federal subject: Oryol Oblast
- Administrative district: Krasnozorensky District

Population (2010 Census)
  - Total: 1,565
  - Estimate (2010): 1,565 (0%)

Administrative status
  - Capital of: Korsakovsky District, Krasnozorensky Selsoviet

Municipal status
  - Municipal district: Krasnozorensky Municipal District
  - Rural settlement: Krasnozorenskoye Selsoviet Rural Settlement
  - Capital of: Krasnozorensky Municipal District, Krasnozorenskoye Selsoviet Rural Settlement
- Time zone: UTC+3 (MSK)
- Postal code: 303650
- OKTMO ID: 54624407101

Krasnaya Zarya (Russian: Красная Заря) is a rural locality (a settlement) and the administrative center of Krasnozorensky District, Oryol Oblast, Russia. Population: 1,565 (2010 census); 1,826 (2002 census); 1,821 (1989 Soviet census).
