= Telegino, Oryol Oblast =

Rural locality in Khotynetsky District, Oryol Oblast, Russia

Coordinates: 53°11′15″N 35°21′57″E

Telegino (Russian: Теле́гино) is a village in Khotynetsky District of Oryol Oblast, Russia.
