= Krasnozorensky District =

Krasnozorensky District Краснозоренский район (Russian)
- District
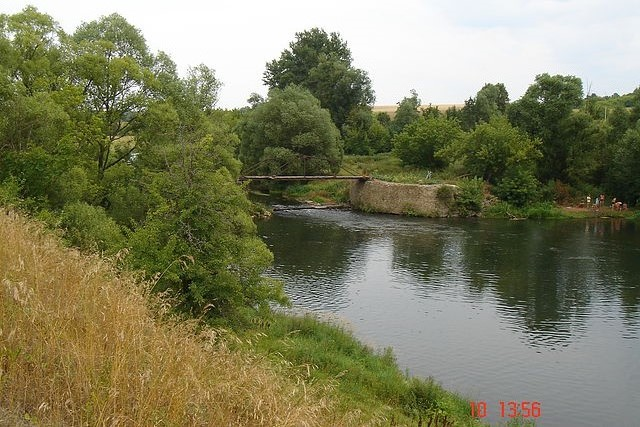
- Bridge to mill, Krasnozorensky District

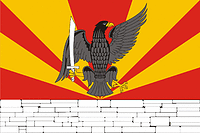
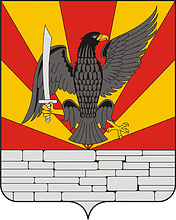
- Flag Coat of arms
- Location of Krasnozorensky District in Oryol Oblast
- Coordinates: 52°47′05″N 37°40′47″E
- Country: Russia
- Federal subject: Oryol Oblast
- Established: 18 January 1935
- Administrative center: Krasnaya Zarya

Area
  - Total: 650.0 km^{2} (251.0 sq mi)

Population (2010 Census)
  - Total: 6,504
  - Density: 10.01/km^{2} (25.92/sq mi)
  - Urban: 0%
  - Rural: 100%

Administrative structure
  - Administrative divisions: 5 selsoviet
  - Inhabited localities: 53 rural localities

Municipal structure
  - Municipally incorporated as: Krasnozorensky Municipal District
  - Municipal divisions: 0 urban settlements, 5 rural settlements
- Time zone: UTC+3 (MSK)
- OKTMO ID: 54624000
- Website: http://www.krzarya.ru/

Krasnozorensky District (Russian: Краснозоренский райо́н) is an administrative and municipal district (raion), one of the twenty-four in Oryol Oblast, Russia. It is located in the east of the oblast. The area of the district is 650.0 square kilometers (251.0 sq mi). Its administrative center is the rural locality (a selo) of Krasnaya Zarya. Population: 6,504 (2010 Census); 8,610 (2002 census); 9,344 (1989 Soviet census). The population of Krasnaya Zarya accounts for 24.1% of the district's total population.

== Notable residents ==
- Viktor Kulikov (1921–2013), Warsaw Pact commander-in-chief 1977–1989, born in the village of Verkhnyaya Lyubovsha
