= Soskovsky District =

Soskovsky District Сосковский район (Russian)
- District
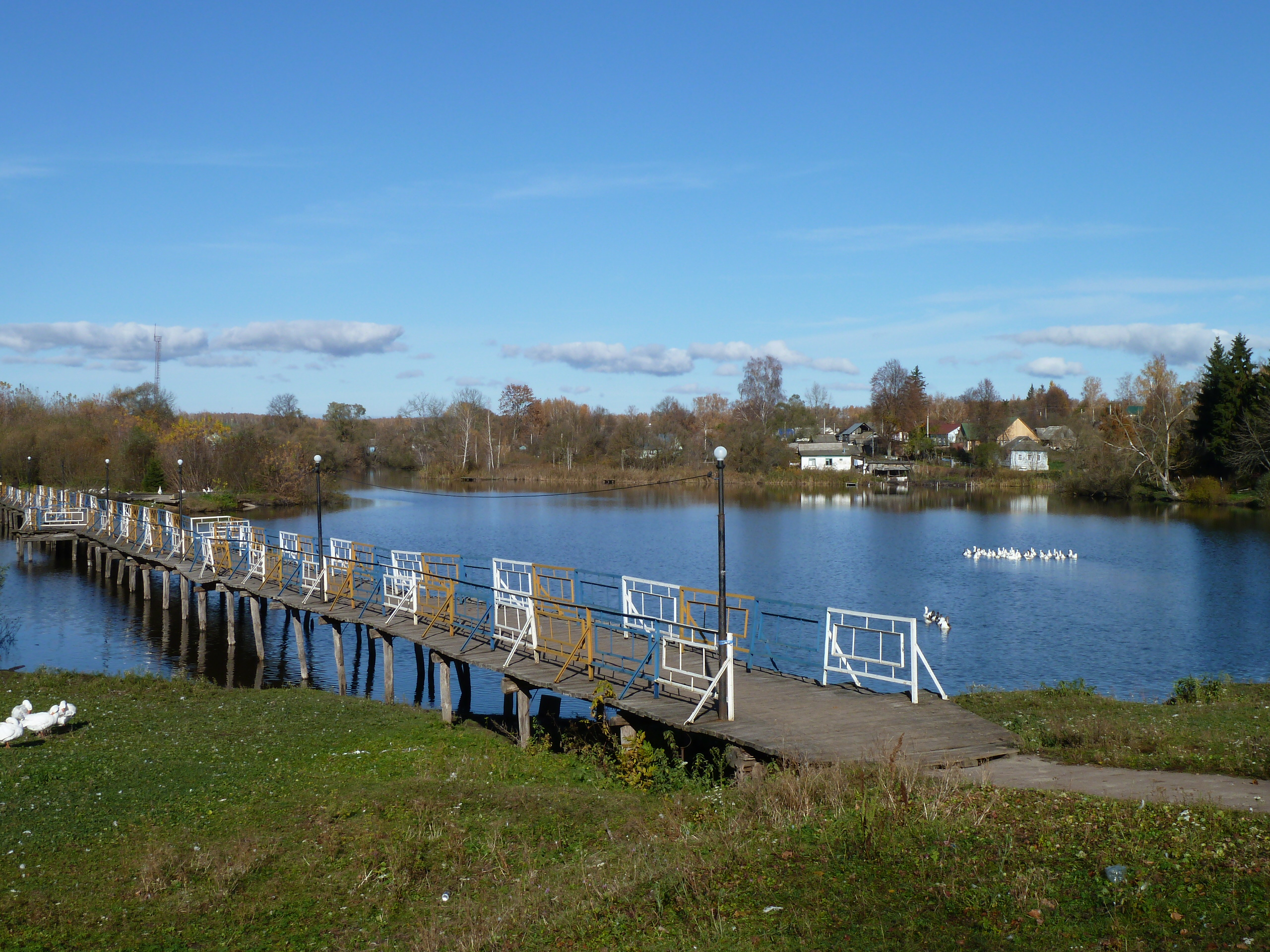
- Pond and village, Soskovsky District

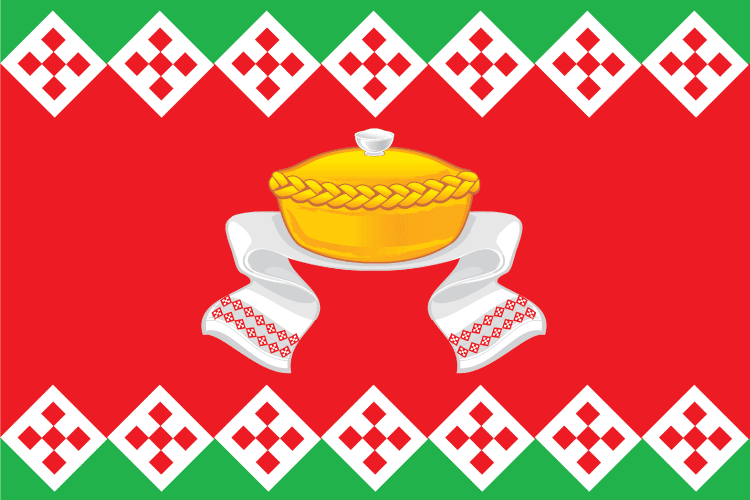
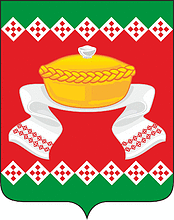
- Flag Coat of arms
- Location of Soskovsky District in Oryol Oblast
- Coordinates: 52°44′45″N 35°23′11″E
- Country: Russia
- Federal subject: Oryol Oblast
- Established: 30 July 1928
- Administrative center: Soskovo

Area
  - Total: 611.6 km^{2} (236.1 sq mi)

Population (2010 Census)
  - Total: 5,982
  - Density: 9.781/km^{2} (25.33/sq mi)
  - Urban: 0%
  - Rural: 100%

Administrative structure
  - Administrative divisions: 7 selsoviet
  - Inhabited localities: 82 rural localities

Municipal structure
  - Municipally incorporated as: Soskovsky Municipal District
  - Municipal divisions: 0 urban settlements, 7 rural settlements
- Time zone: UTC+3 (MSK)
- OKTMO ID: 54653000
- Website: http://adminsoskov.57ru.ru/

Soskovsky District (Russian: Сосковский райо́н) is an administrative and municipal district (raion), one of the twenty-four in Oryol Oblast, Russia. It is located in the west of the oblast. The area of the district is 611.6 square kilometers (236.1 sq mi). Its administrative center is the rural locality (a selo) of Soskovo. Population: 5,982 (2010 Census); 8,214 (2002 census); 9,122 (1989 Soviet census). The population of Soskovo accounts for 30.0% of the district's total population.

== See also ==
- Yelkovo
