= Korsakovsky District, Oryol Oblast =

Korsakovsky District Корсаковский район (Russian)
- District
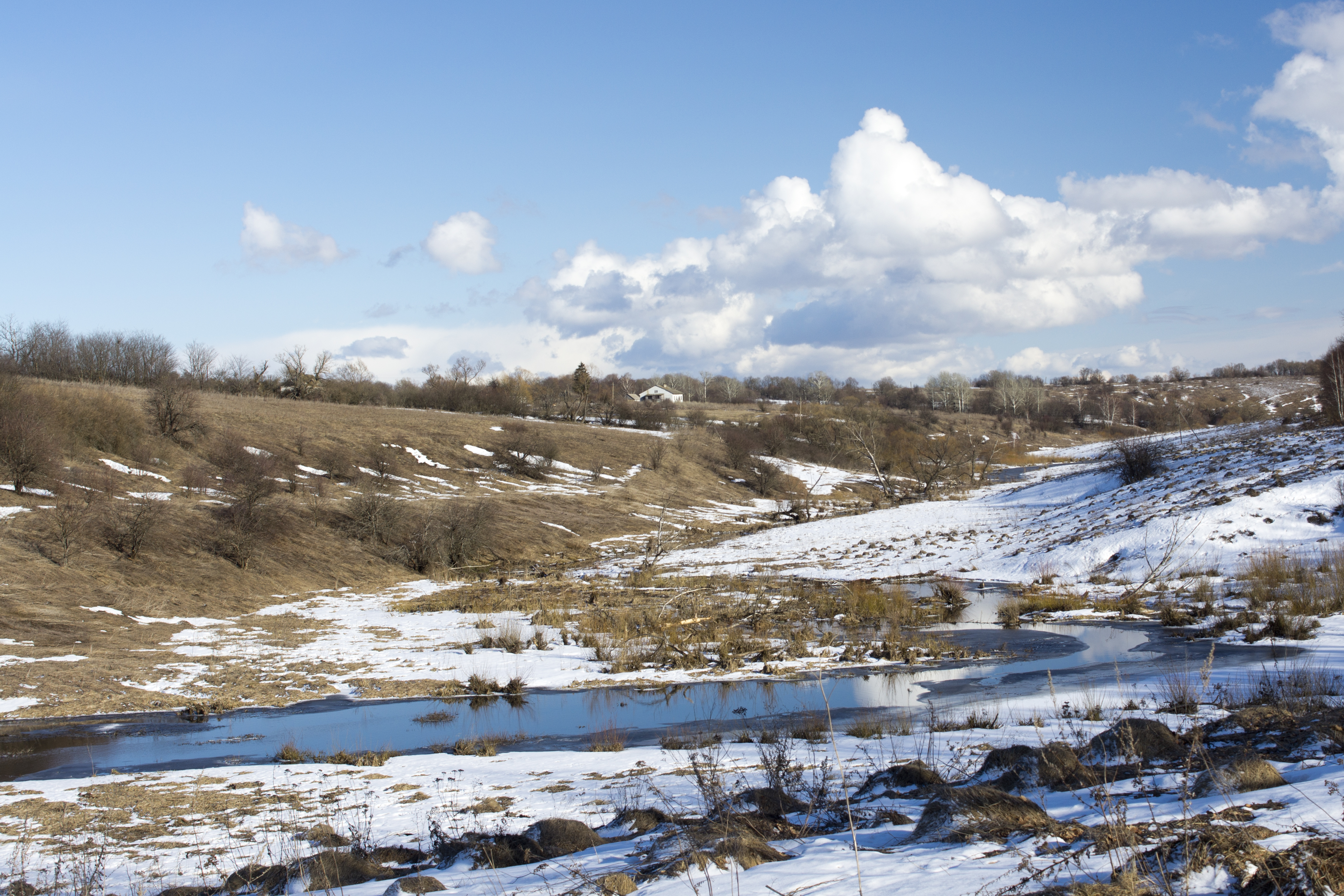
- Landscape in Korsakovsky District

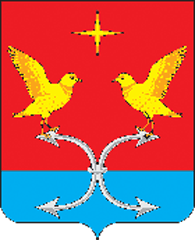
- Flag Coat of arms
- Location of Korsakovsky District in Oryol Oblast
- Coordinates: 53°16′01″N 37°21′34″E
- Country: Russia
- Federal subject: Oryol Oblast
- Established: 30 July 1928
- Administrative center: Korsakovo

Area
  - Total: 690.9 km^{2} (266.8 sq mi)

Population (2010 Census)
  - Total: 4,798
  - Density: 6.945/km^{2} (17.99/sq mi)
  - Urban: 0
  - Rural: 100%

Administrative structure
  - Administrative divisions: 7 selsoviet
  - Inhabited localities: 72 rural localities

Municipal structure
  - Municipally incorporated as: Korsakovsky Municipal District
  - Municipal divisions: 0 urban settlements, 7 rural settlements
- Time zone: UTC+3 (MSK)
- OKTMO ID: 54626000
- Website: https://корсаково57.рф/

Korsakovsky District (Russian: Корса́ковский райо́н) is an administrative and municipal district (raion), one of the twenty-four in Oryol Oblast, Russia. It is located in the northeast of the oblast. The area of the district is 690.9 square kilometers (266.8 sq mi). Its administrative center is the rural locality (a selo) of Korsakovo. Population: 4,798 (2010 Census); 5,586 (2002 census). The population of Korsakovo accounts for 30.3% of the district's total population.
