= Kromskoy District =

Kromskoy District Кромской район (Russian)
- District
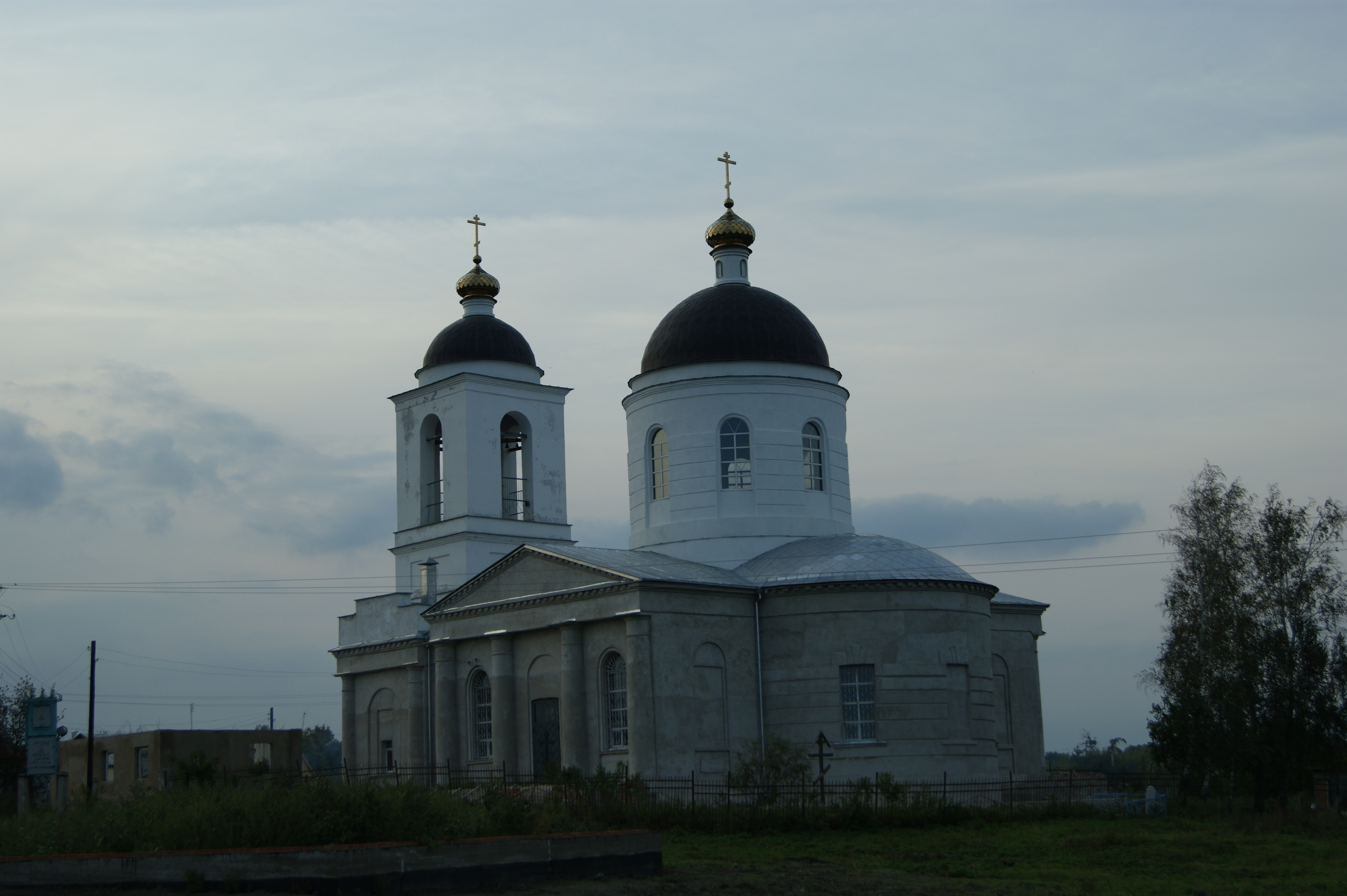
- Trinity Church, Kromskoy District

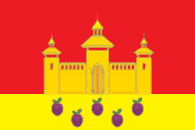
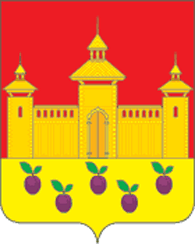
- Flag Coat of arms
- Location of Kromskoy District in Oryol Oblast
- Coordinates: 52°41′N 35°46′E
- Country: Russia
- Federal subject: Oryol Oblast
- Administrative center: Kromy

Area
  - Total: 969 km^{2} (374 sq mi)

Population (2010 Census)
  - Total: 21,346
  - Density: 22.0/km^{2} (57.1/sq mi)
  - Urban: 31.5%
  - Rural: 68.5%

Administrative structure
  - Administrative divisions: 1 Urban-type settlements, 12 Selsoviets
  - Inhabited localities: 1 urban-type settlements, 136 rural localities

Municipal structure
  - Municipally incorporated as: Kromskoy Municipal District
  - Municipal divisions: 1 urban settlements, 12 rural settlements
- Time zone: UTC+3 (MSK)
- OKTMO ID: 54625000
- Website: http://admkrom.ru/

Kromskoy District (Russian: Кромской райо́н) is an administrative and municipal district (raion), one of the twenty-four in Oryol Oblast, Russia. It is located in the southwest of the oblast. The area of the district is 969 square kilometers (374 sq mi). Its administrative center is the urban locality (an urban-type settlement) of Kromy. Population: 21,346 (2010 Census); 24,400 (2002 census); 24,825 (1989 Soviet census). The population of Kromy accounts for 31.5% of the district's total population.
