= Pokrovsky District =

Pokrovsky District Покровский район (Russian)
- District
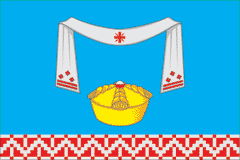
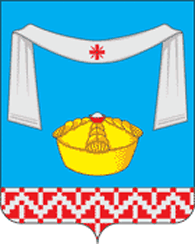
- Flag Coat of arms
- Location of Pokrovsky District in Oryol Oblast
- Coordinates: 52°36′44″N 36°52′05″E
- Country: Russia
- Federal subject: Oryol Oblast
- Established: 18 January 1935
- Administrative center: Pokrovskoye

Area
  - Total: 1,411 km^{2} (545 sq mi)

Population (2010 Census)
  - Total: 14,782
  - Density: 10.48/km^{2} (27.13/sq mi)
  - Urban: 30.0%
  - Rural: 70.0%

Administrative structure
  - Administrative divisions: 1 Urban-type settlements, 13 Selsoviets
  - Inhabited localities: 1 urban-type settlements, 164 rural localities

Municipal structure
  - Municipally incorporated as: Pokrovsky Municipal District
  - Municipal divisions: 1 urban settlements, 13 rural settlements
- Time zone: UTC+3 (MSK)
- OKTMO ID: 54650000
- Website: http://admpokrov.ru/

Pokrovsky District (Russian: Покро́вский райо́н) is an administrative and municipal district (raion), one of the twenty-four in Oryol Oblast, Russia. It is located in the southeastern central part of the oblast. The area of the district is 1,411 square kilometers (545 sq mi). Its administrative center is the urban locality (an urban-type settlement) of Pokrovskoye. Population: 14,782 (2010 Census); 18,027 (2002 Census); 20,056 (1989 Soviet census). The population of Pokrovskoye accounts for 30.0% of the district's total population.

== Notable residents ==
- Antonina Fedorovna Sofronova (1892–1966), artist and illustrator, born in Droskovo

== See also ==
- Droskovo
