= Belarusian icon-painting school of the 16th–18th centuries =

Icon-painting school

Belarusian icon-painting school of the 16th–18th centuries (Russian: Белорусская иконописная школа XVI—XVIII веков) is a school of icon painting that was formed under the influence of the Renaissance and based on the traditions of the Byzantine Empire and Old Russian art. The process of its formation and development lasted for several centuries. The school developed on the basis of Byzantine traditions, absorbing in the New Time the features of Western European art — the Renaissance (14th–16th centuries), Baroque (late 16th–18th centuries), Classicism (second half of the 18th century). The works of Belarusian icon painting are characterized by adherence to the canon, conventionality and symbolism of the pictorial language, characteristic type, wide use of ethnographic elements, the desire to reflect the surrounding reality.

== Origins ==
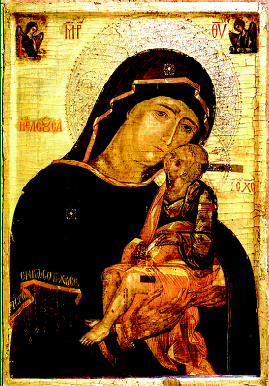
Malorita Icon of the Mother of God

According to researchers, the first icons to appear on the territory of Belarus were in the large cities of Polotsk and Turov. They were probably of Byzantine origin (according to legend, Euphrosyne of Polotsk received an icon of the Mother of God from the Byzantine Emperor Manuel I Komnenos). The tradition of local canonical writing may date back to the time of the adoption of Christianity by the local population, approximately in the 9th century. The foundation for the formation of the Belarusian school of icon painting was, as in many other Christian countries, the Byzantine style that was widespread at that time. Its influence persisted throughout the 11th–15th centuries.

The formation of a local school of icon painting dates back to the 15th–16th centuries. By this time, local artists had not only mastered the experience of Byzantine traditions and painting technologies, but had also acquired an individual style, types, characters, their own vision of colours, and had begun to create their own iconographic images. At the initial stage, Belarusian icon painting developed under the significant influence of Polish culture.

Information from archival sources and the high level of surviving individual monuments indicate the flourishing of medieval fine art in the Belarusian lands in the 14th–15th centuries. Icons were painted using the technique of tempera painting or in relief plastic. They could also be found as miniatures in liturgical books

The earliest surviving works of icon painting belong to the Polesie-Volyn region. Among them is the Malorita Icon of the Mother of God from the turn of the 14th–15th centuries. The work combines the main features of medieval art with elements of the Renaissance: light colors, ornamentation that helps to reveal the volume and lyricism of the image.

The late Byzantine artistic tradition of the 15th century, represented by the Greek-Byzantine or Italian-Cretan school, was well known in the Belarusian lands and influenced the formation of local icon painting. Unlike other Slavic painters, Belarusian masters began to use chiaroscuro to reveal form.

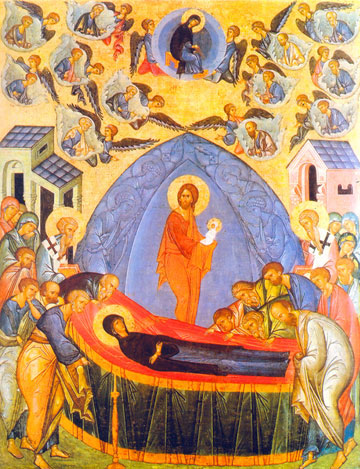
Blue Assumption icon

The 15th-century Blue Dormition icon, taken from Minsk in 1914–1917, was painted from a canopy and a veil. At the bottom of the composition, on a bed covered with a canopy and a blanket, lies the Mother of God in a chiton and maphorion. Behind the bed stands Christ, holding a white-swaddled figurine in front of him — a symbol of Mary's soul. The name of the icon comes from the blue background of the figures of Christ and Mary in heaven (the rest of the background is golden), which was usually used in Byzantine iconography, but was rare among the Eastern Slavs. The iconography, style and technique of the Blue Dormition do not allow us to unambiguously attribute it to a specific artistic centre or school. The similarity of the religious scene to a genre composition, the light soft colours, the calm and benevolent faces of the apostles – all this is characteristic of the Palaeologus period of Byzantium. The Blue Dormition has features characteristic of many regional schools (including Tver, Moscow, Volyn). However, as Alyaksandr Yaroshevich pointed out, the origin of the icon and the historical and cultural situation of the 15th century give reason to assert that the reinterpretation of the Palaeologus style in it took place in the south of Belarus and that the customer of the Dormition was most likely one of the Turov-Pinsk bishops.

== History ==
=== 16th century ===
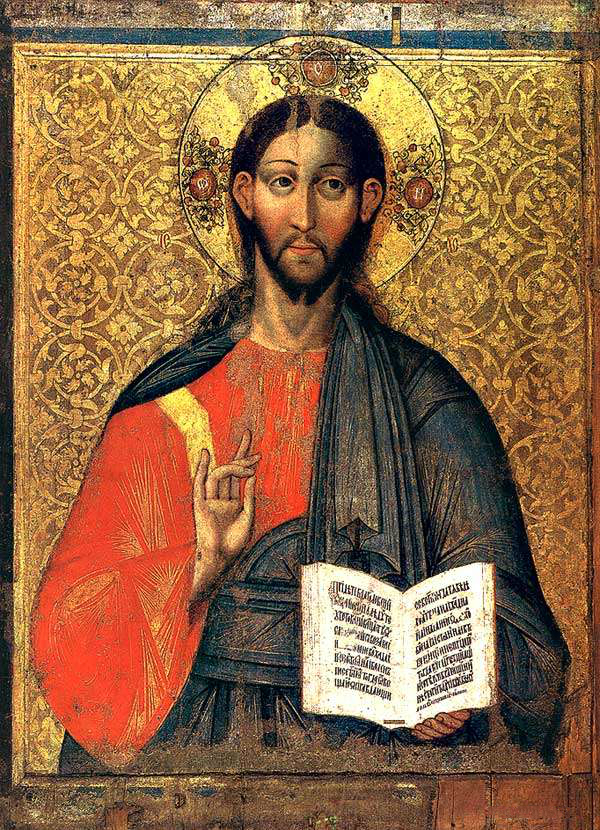
Icon of Christ the Almighty. Assumption Church (1654), Byteń

Since the 16th century, the Belarusian school of icon painting has acquired its own figurative and plastic language and style. The influence of Western European art was felt in the Belarusian lands, and new expressive means were sought for a more lifelike interpretation of the images of saints. During this period, Belarusian icons acquired features of the late Renaissance and early Baroque. However, this did not affect the sacred essence of the images, but only concerned the aesthetic side of the icon. Icons were created in Brest, Grodno, Pinsk, Mogilev, Vitebsk, Polotsk, Minsk and others. They were painted on boards (usually from linden), on glue-chalk ground, egg tempera with oil paints. A striking feature is altar icons, combining features of Gothic, Renaissance, and Baroque. Restrained plastic interpretations are becoming more widespread. The masters often resort to silhouette interpretation of images, limit the molding of forms, model the environment, the clothes of the characters with local spots, cover the background with carved ornament. In the color structure, red-brown, ochre and contrasting blue, greenish colors dominate, the combination of which gives them an emphasized decorative character. The influence of the Renaissance is expressed in the fact that the canonical reflection of pictorial images is diluted with more realistic scenes from life, people look more appropriate and specific. The gradualness of this process is confirmed by the fact that in some samples canonical techniques coexist with a new plastic solution. Another feature of Belarusian icon painting was the combination of Catholic and Orthodox traditions. With the establishment of Uniatism, the mutual influence of the two faiths increased.

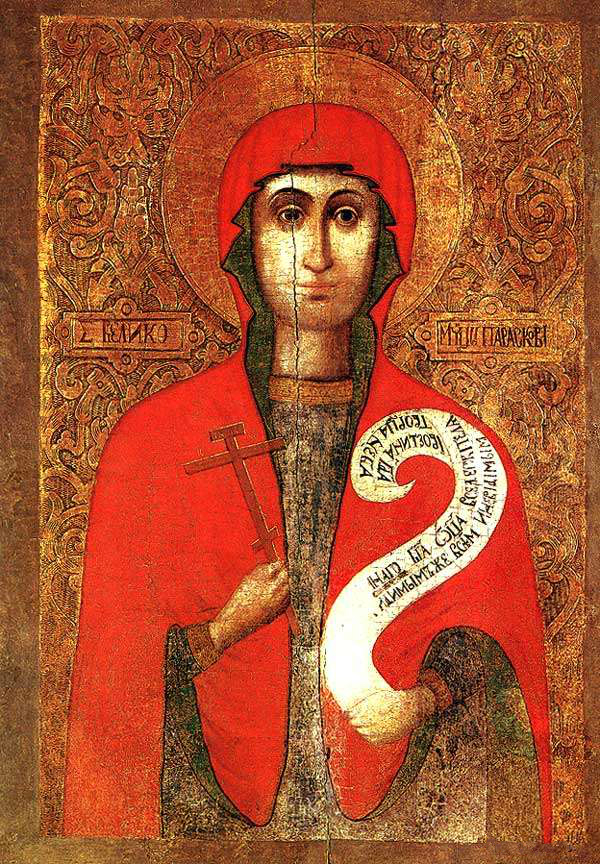
Icon of Saint Paraskeva

According to sources from the 14th–16th centuries, many religious and secular works of art were in use in Belarus, brought from abroad or made according to their model. This also could not but affect the creative style of Belarusian icon painters. The early works of the 16th century were characterized by a combination of distinctive features of medieval art with elements of the Renaissance: light colors, lyricism of the image ("Our Lady of Jerusalem" from Brest Oblast). The tendency to model volume and perspective, which began in the 15th century, continued and developed in the 16th century, which is well illustrated by such works as Paraskeva and the Byteń Christ Pantocrator.

The iconographic image of "Paraskeva" from Slutsk goes back to the engraving "Petka" from the book "Micah the Chosen", published by the Serb colony in Venice in 1538. The Belarusian artist preserved the proportions and outline of the figure, but significantly rethought this engraving. In this monument of the middle-second half of the 16th century. For the first time, a carved plant background appeared, the image of which originated in Renaissance Italian fabrics. Important shifts occurred in the artist's understanding of depth and volume. The former graphic quality was replaced by soft modeling of the folds of clothing, emphasizing the volume of the figure. The work is based on a natural drawing. The icon "Paraskeva" is of great importance for the characteristics of easel painting in the middle and second half of the 16th century. The work became a striking example of the creative searches of the masters of Belarus in the 16th century, who worked on creating their own artistic style.

=== 17th century ===
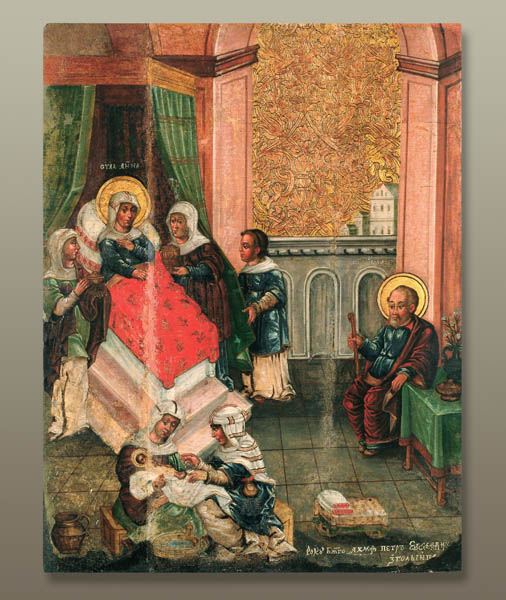
Birth of the Mother of God. Pyotr Evseevich, 1649

At the turn of the 16th and 17th centuries, there was a desire to convey space and natural proportions, and individual characters began to be depicted in secular clothing. The icons "Saint Paraskeva" from Pod Mosty, "Umilenie", "Pokrov", "Dormition" from Brest region were characterized by optimism, a bright mood, and faith in higher justice. Icon painting in the 17th century remained the most common type of painting. It was in the 17th century that the West Polesie icon painting school began to flourish with its characteristic features.

The icon of Pyotr Yevseyevich from Golynets, Birth of the Mother of God from 1649 is considered a masterpiece. This is the only icon whose author is known, because he left his last name on it. The icons "Old Testament Trinity" (Brest region), "Descent into Hell" from Chachersk. Since the 17th century, they began to paint on canvas. The Belynichi Icon of the Mother of God, have survived while generally preserving the canonicity of forms, does not limit the artistic language of the author.

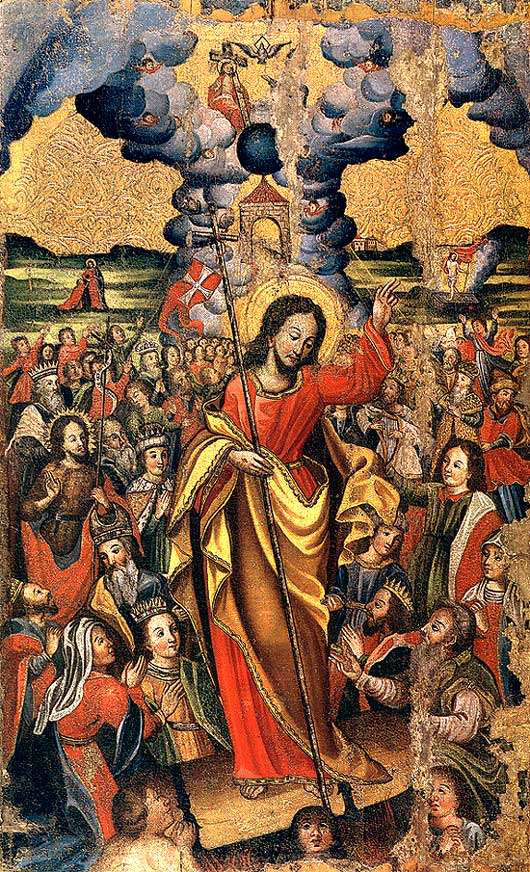
The Descent into Hell. Last quarter of the 17th century. Fragment

The development of the "Trinity" theme in Belarusian icon painting can be judged by the surviving monuments, the earliest of which dates back to the last quarter of the 17th century. In the icon from Krichev, the main geometric forms that give the work clarity, stability, and completeness are easily discernible. The figures of angels are inscribed in a circle, which shows their unity and indivisibility. This figure is repeated in the form of the table where the sacrament of the Divine Meal is performed – a prototype of the Eucharist. In the center of the circle, an isosceles triangle can be guessed, which since early Christian times has been a symbol of the trinity of God.

The icon of the last quarter of the 17th century Descent into Hell from Disna stands out for its expanded composition and richness of characters. It contains the entire gospel story. The work is a transfer of a Western European altar painting of the Renaissance era into the space of a Belarusian icon.

=== 18th century ===
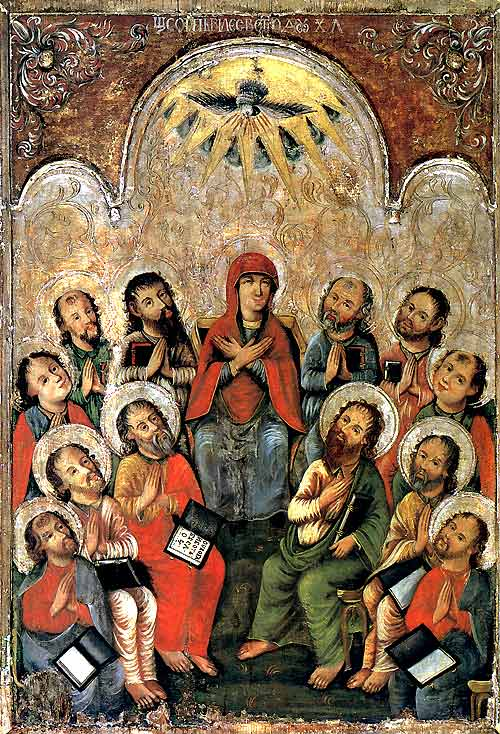
Pentecost, second half of the 18th century.

In the 18th century, Belarusian icon painting was notable for its increased manifestations of folk art and realism. The masters adhered to the traditions of both Old Russian and local painting.

In this century, icon painting in various regions of Belarus was marked by the manifestation of the Baroque style, the desire to reveal the psychology and character of the characters, their emotional state. Genre painting, landscape, and still life, which were widespread at that time, are present to varying degrees in the sacred subjects of local masters.

At the beginning of the 18th century, Belarusian icon painting (as well as easel painting in general) showed a departure from the principles and canons accepted in religious painting. Masters during this period adhered to the traditions of both Old Russian and local painting, which did not correspond to the position of the official Orthodox Church. The originality of Belarusian icon painting in the 18th century is emotional expressiveness, colourist decorativeness, richness of ornamentation, immediacy of the disclosure of the plot, folklore reflection of the action, the desire for a real transfer of reality

One of the most famous Belarusian icon painters of the 18th century was the master Grigory Medvedsky. He painted churches, painted icons ("Christ Almighty" and others) for the iconostasis of the church in Popova Gora. In 1783, he created the iconostasis of the Ilyinskaya Church in Zhuravichi (Rogachev district).

The icon of the Mother of God of Zhirovichi is widely known. This is an artistic copy of a Roman fresco icon, which is painted on canvas. In 1730, she was crowned with papal crowns. Today, the icon is venerated in the Church of St. Andrew in Slonim.

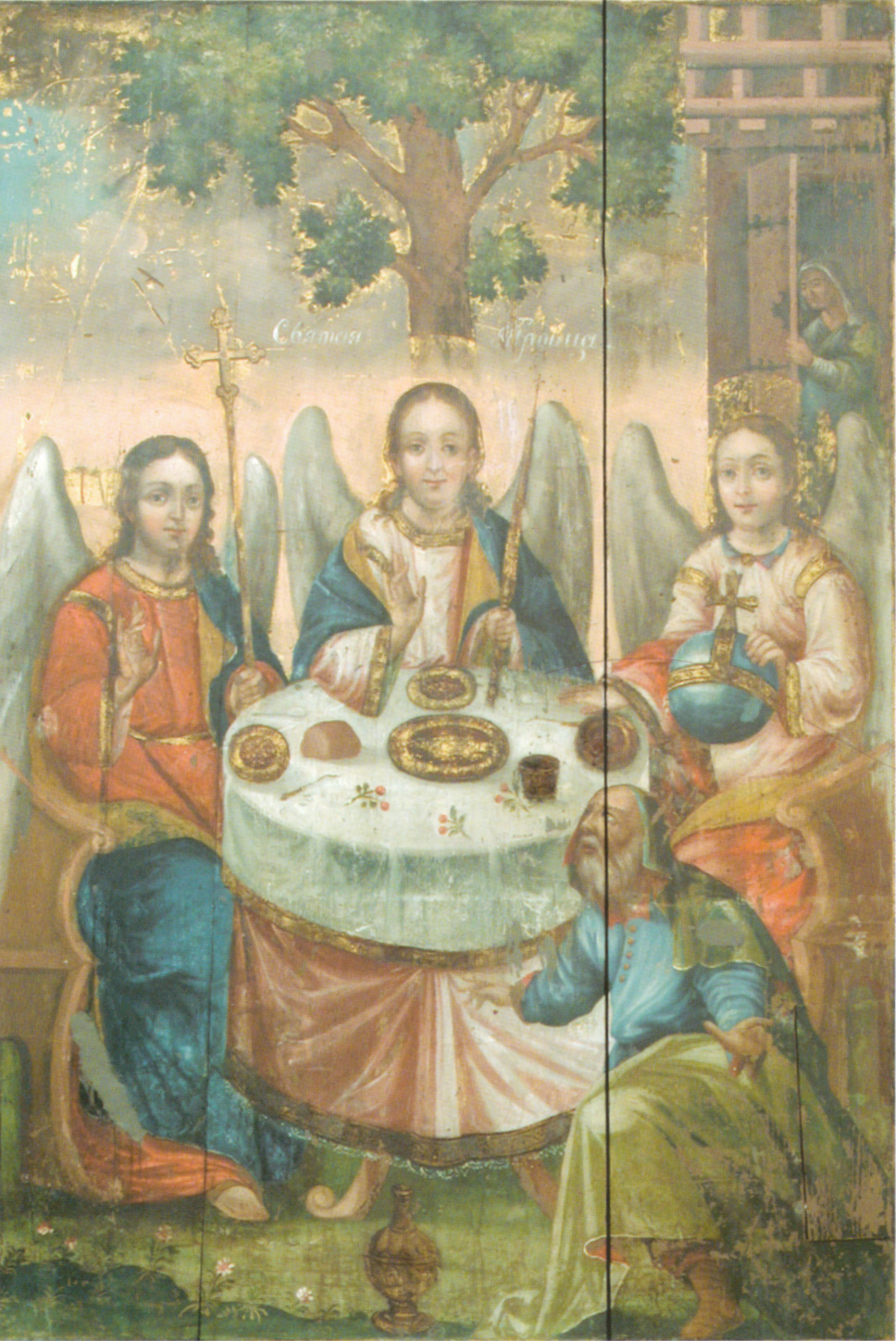
Old Testament Trinity

A rare and little-studied iconographic version of Nikola the Abominable has become widespread in Belarus. It appeared no earlier than the 18th century and was especially widespread in the Old Believer spiritual and artistic center of the city of Vetka and its environs, where it was included in the local icon-painting tradition. In these Old Believer communities, this image was surrounded by special veneration. The iconographic version of Nikola the Abominable existed in the icon painting of Vetka until the middle of the 20th century. "Nikola the Abominable" is most often a shoulder-length image of the saint. Nikola the Abominable turns his head to the right of the viewer, but the gaze of his large eyes is directed, on the contrary, to the left. The lower line of the image often cuts off the Gospel and the hand blessing the viewer in halfу.

Engravings by old printers played a significant role in the writing of icons - artists who used the compositions of book miniatures. This made the icon more understandable and accessible to understanding among ordinary people, but at the same time violated traditional religious canons, since it did not correspond to the structural compositional iconographic schemes. One such example of borrowing from book engravings is the icon "Trinity" from Velikoye Maleshev in the Brest region, the image of which turned out to be as if in a mirror image: the angels on the icon bless with their left hand, and hold staffs in their right hand.

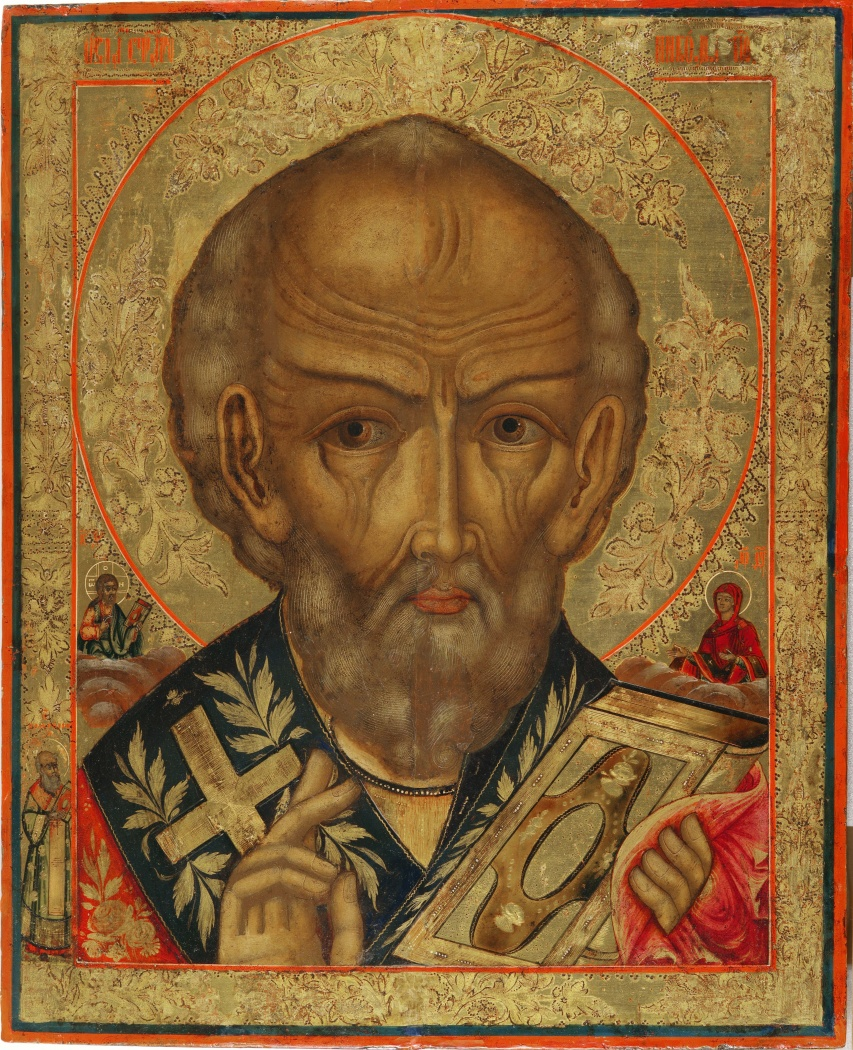
Saint Nicholas the Abominable. Third quarter of the 19th century. 44 × 36.2 cm

By the end of the 18th century, icon painting acquired a more decorative rather than pictorial character. Artists painted only the hands and faces of saints, and the background and the entire compositional space were filled with metal, silver or gilded overlay with carving on gesso. Such examples can be seen on the icons "The Miracle of Yuri and the Serpent" (1729), "The Nativity of Christ" (1746), in the three-leaf syllable Natalia. Mother of God Hodegetria (1760) from Turov. However, the departure from the standard canons of iconographic subjects worried the clergy, who saw in the folk icon an undermining of faith. The official church tried to resist folk icon painting, and a campaign was conducted to prohibit the distribution of non-canonical works.

=== Decline ===
By the 19th century, a certain decline was evident, characteristic of most icon-painting schools. The active development of printed graphics in a sense contributed to this. The decline began at the end of the 18th century, as Belarusian icon painting gradually lost its originality and ceased to exist as a separate artistic school. The Belarusian icon itself disappeared after 1839, when the Union of Brest was liquidated.
