= Słonim Ghetto =

Nazi ghetto in occupied Belarus

- Slonim location during the Holocaust in Eastern Europe

- Slonim in modern-day Belarus
- Location: Slonim, Western Belarus, German-occupied Poland; 53°05′49″N 25°19′29″E
- Incident type: Imprisonment, slave labor, mass killings
- Organizations: SS, Einsatzgruppe C, Belarusian Auxiliary Police, Wehrmacht
- Executions: Pietrolewicze, Czepielów
- Victims: 22,000–25,000 Jews

The Słonim Ghetto (Polish: getto w Słonimiu; Belarusian: Слонімскае гета; German: Ghetto von Slonim; Yiddish: סלאָנים) was a Nazi German ghetto established in 1941 by the SS in Slonim, Western Belarus, German-occupied Poland during World War II. Prior to 1939, the town (Słonim) was part of the Second Polish Republic. The town was captured in late June 1941 by the Wehrmacht in the early stages of Operation Barbarossa. Anti-Jewish measures were promptly put into place, and a barb-wire surrounded ghetto had been created by 12 July. The killings of Jews by mobile extermination squads began almost immediately. Mass killings took place in July and November. The survivors were used as slave labor. After each killing, significant looting by the Nazis occurred. A Judenrat was established to pay a large ransom; after paying out 2 million roubles of gold, its members were then executed. In March 1942, ghettos in the surrounding areas were merged into the Słonim ghetto.

On 29 June 1942, the ghetto revolted, families went into hiding underground, and armed struggle broke out. Five Germans were killed; they retaliated by killing between 8,000 and 55,000 Jews (based on figures by Nazis). By August the ghetto was nearly empty, and the last few hundred inhabitants were killed. Some Jews had escaped to a nearby Catholic Church, which was revealed by the collaborationist local government. The Nazis raided the church and killed the priest and two nuns, all who would later be beatified. Słonim was recaptured by the Soviets in 1944, and would eventually become part of Belarus. According to the Encyclopedia of the Holocaust, some 22,000 people died in the Słonim ghetto.

== Background ==
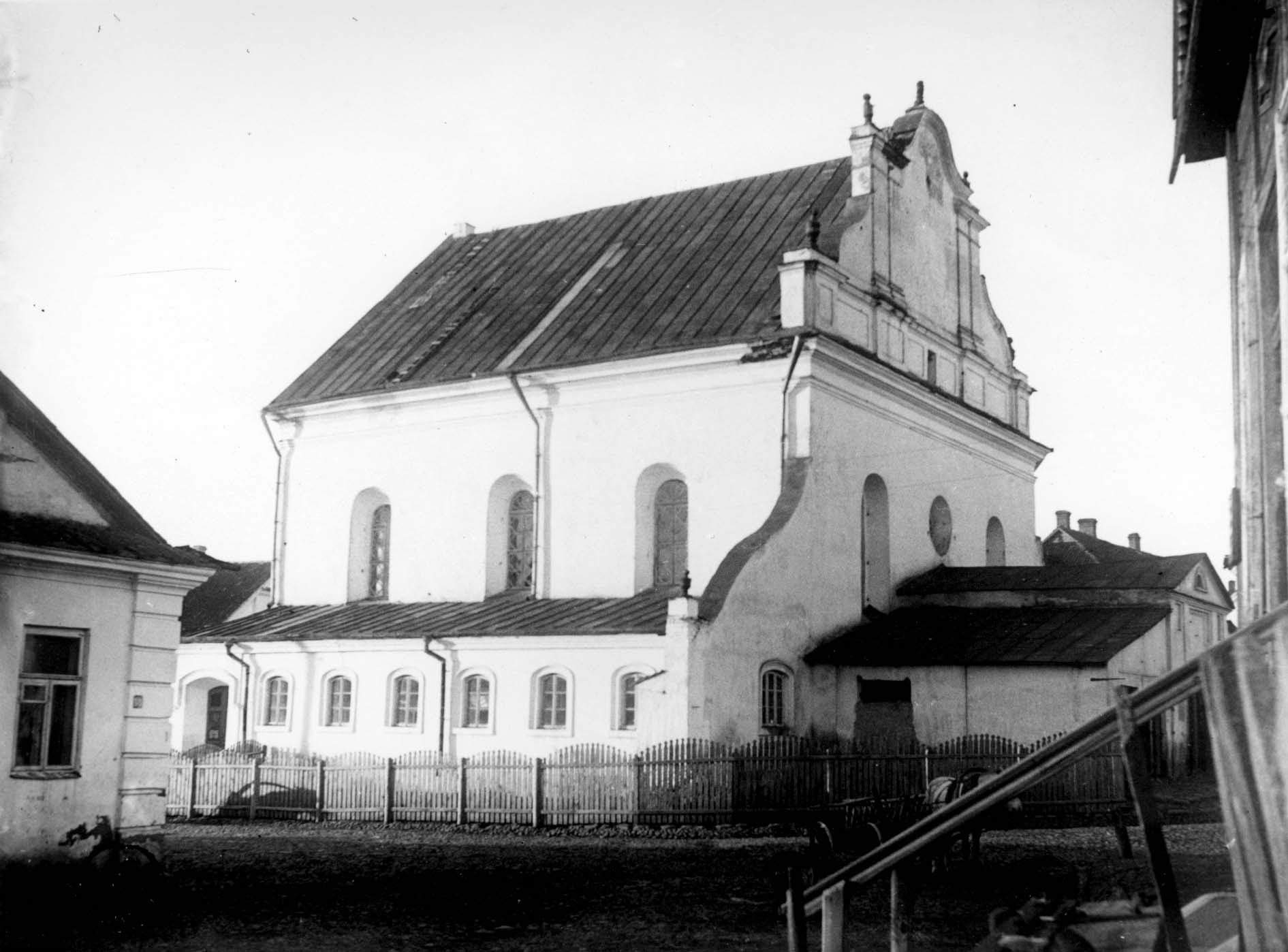
The Grand Synagogue of Slonim in 1930

After the establishment of the Second Polish Republic at the end of the First World War, and according to Polish census of 1921, there were 6,917 Jews in the city. According to the Polish census of 1931, the Jewish population grew again to 8,605 or 64% of the rapidly expanding population of 16,251 with 4,899 Catholics. There were 10 new Jewish schools in Słonim, including the Yiddish high school.

During the Nazi-Soviet invasion of Poland in September 1939 Słonim was taken over by the Red Army. Słonim turned into a destination for Polish-Jewish refugees escaping from the German-controlled territory of western Poland. Living conditions became very difficult. While the number of refugees in the fall of 1939 was around 2,000 by local count, their total had grown to 15,216 just one year later. The oppressive conditions of the Soviet system made the majority of newcomers unable to find work. Others collaborated; chiefly the young men with nothing to lose.

== Slonim ghetto formation ==
The Germans rolled into the city on 24–26 June 1941 amid bombing and shelling. Anti-Jewish measures were imposed right away to ensure isolation. Hundreds of men were rounded up and brought into the municipal stadium where they were beaten and killed during interrogations which lasted for one week. Soon thereafter, Gebietskommissar Gerhard Erren, the German commandant of Słonim, appointed in August, ordered the creation of the Judenrat with eleven members, to carry out his orders. Judenrat president, Wolf Berman, an 80-year-old former bank director, was forced to collect a ransom of 2 million roubles in gold. The lump-sum payment went into private hands and the entire Jewish council was executed. Other prominent members of the community feared to join the Judenrat lest they share their fate. The new council was made responsible for organizing and supplying forced labour. The Jewish Ghetto Police was also created, with 30 uniformed men. As of 12 July 1941 Słonim Jews were ordered to wear the Star of David on their outer garments. All Jews living around the city centre were evicted, and moved across the bridge over the Szczara River to a brand new ghetto in the Na Wyspie (literally On Island) neighbourhood, surrounded by barbed wire and guards at both gates. Meanwhile, the second group of Judenrat members were all, like their predecessors, executed on 14 November 1941. After each shooting, self-enrichment among the perpetrators began immediately. On one occasion, Oberleutnant Glück sent a full boxcar with Jewish valuables to his hometown of Rosenheim under armed escort, particularly fur coats and articles made from precious metals. A Belarusian auxiliary policeman, Stanislaw Chrzanowski (died 2017 in England), is alleged to have been involved with the Slonim ghetto and to have been a postwar spy for MI6

=== Nazi atrocities ===
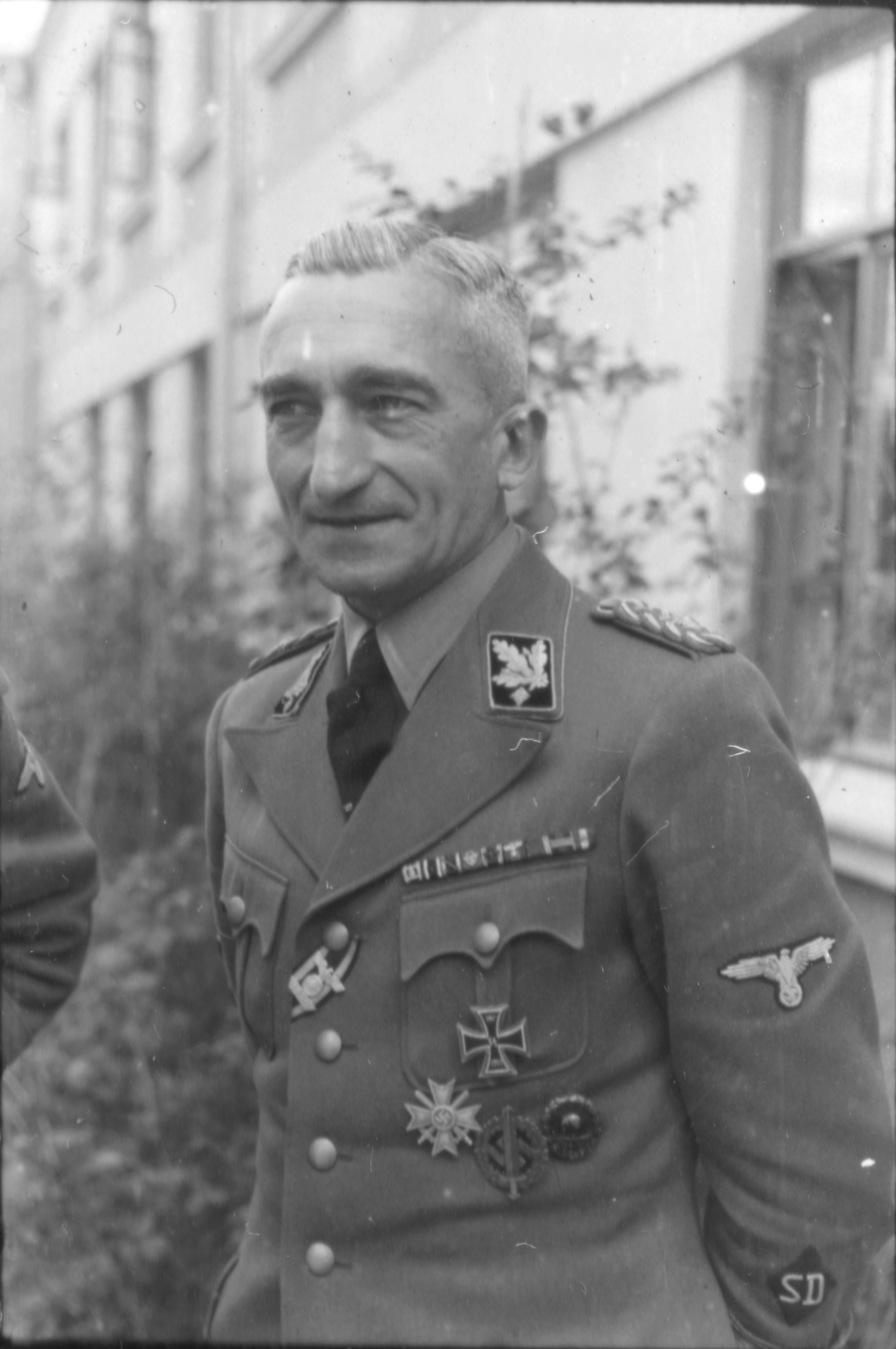
Arthur Nebe, head of the SS Einsatzgruppe B

The first large-scale extermination of Jews in Słonim took place on 17 July 1941, as soon as the EG-B's Einsatzkommando 8 under the command of Otto Badfisch arrived in the town along with the Order Police battalion stationing in Minsk. Just prior to the massacre, burial pits were prepared on the outskirts of the village Pietrolewicze nearby. Some 2,000 Jews were rounded up in the square, and 1,075 of them, or 1,200 by Polish estimates, were loaded into lorries, never to return. The role of the collaborationist Belarusian Auxiliary Police (established on 7 July 1941) was crucial in the totality of procedures, as only they – wrote Martin Dean – knew the identity of the Jews. After that, the count of the Jewish population was ordered, and the selection of craftsmen and qualified labourers took place. The workers were issued Kennkarte and moved; in October 1941 a special ghetto zone was set up for them at the 'Na Wyspie' neighbourhood. Some hoped that over the long run the knowledge of German coupled with professional skills would save them from imminent death. More Jews were brought in from neighbouring settlements. In March 1942 the makeshift ghettos in Iwacewicze, Dereczyn, Gołynka, Byteń, and Kosów in the vicinity were liquidated. All inmates were marched on foot to the Słonim ghetto to perish there.

The second mass murder of Słonim Jews by Einsatzgruppe B took place five months later, on 14 November 1941. In the so-called second sweep, the ghetto was cordoned off and 9,000 people were taken by lorries to the village of Czepielów, 7 kilometres (4.3 mi) distance, where they were shot in the pits by rifle fire. The ghettoised Jews were fully aware of the progress of the massacre because a few prisoners escaped back. During the course of the operation, the Belarusian Schutzmannschaft-Einzeldienst (formed by Max von Schenckendorff) forced the Jews out of their homes and convoyed them to Czepielów under armed escort. They also took part in the shooting by the SS, aided by the Latvian and Lithuanian auxiliaries. After the mass killings, they actively searched for the Jews in hiding. By 13 November 1941 only 7,000 skilled workers remained alive inside the ghetto, all bound into the forced labour process. The testimonies, written by the Jewish-Polish survivors, are currently held at the Archives of the Jewish Historical Institute in Warsaw.

=== The revolt ===
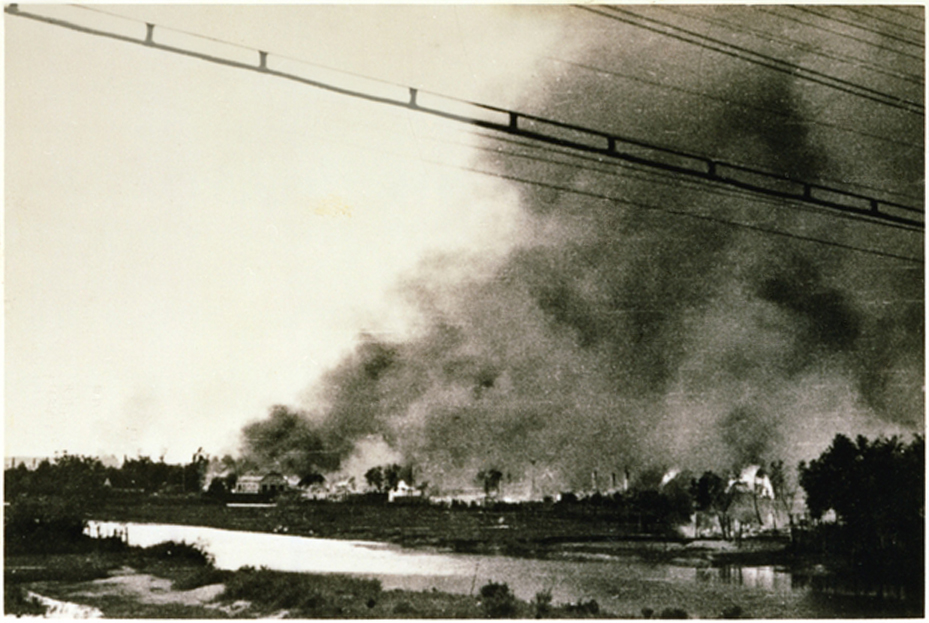
The burning Słonim Ghetto across the Szczara River during the Jewish revolt which erupted in the course of the final ghetto extermination action, 29 June 1942

On the morning of 29 June 1942 the Jews staged a revolt to defend themselves from further deportations. All families descended into the secret bunkers. Tunnels were also dug leading outside. Members of the underground led by David Epshtein shot at the arriving troops using stockpiled firearms refurbished at the Beutelager. At least five Germans were killed and many others wounded. The Nazis set fire to the ghetto in retaliation. The Jewish hospital with patients inside was blown up by the SS. The extermination actions leading to subsequent ghetto complete eradication continued between 29 June and 15 July 1942. For two weeks, the fugitives were hunted down and trucked from Słonim to the killing fields near the village of Pietrolewicze by the SS, Orpo, and Belarusian police. The revolt was crushed with the help of arriving reinforcements which included Latvian, Lithuanian and Ukrainian Schutzmannschaft. Head of the Jewish Arbeitsamt, Gerszon Kvint, was shot point blank by Rittmaier. Between 8,000 (Kube) and up to 13,000 people were murdered in their homes or out in the streets and in the killing fields. Saved by the Polish nuns in a Catholic convent 62 miles from Słonim, Oswald Rufeisen remembered: "I did not see Poles there murdering Jews, although I did see Poles being murdered." The size of the Słonim Ghetto was greatly reduced after that. One month later, on 31 July 1942, Generalkommissar for Weissruthenien Wilhelm Kube, delivered a report to Hinrich Lohse summarising the ghetto liquidation action and subsequent "Jew-hunts". According to him, in the preceding ten weeks some 55,000 Jews were exterminated in the region.

The fourth and final ghetto extermination action took place on 20 August 1942, during which the last 700 men and 100 women performing various tasks (such as clean-up as well as mass burials) were rounded up and murdered. The Słonim Ghetto was no more. Many Jews had fled into the woods; 30 people formed an autonomous Jewish fighting group called Schtorrs 51 (Shchors) in the vicinity of Kosovo, helped by Pavel Proniagin in defiance of Soviet orders. Others had remained in hiding on the Aryan side. According to Encyclopedia of the Holocaust, 22,000 Jews in and around Słonim had been murdered.

== Aftermath ==
Four months after the last ghetto massacre, during the night of 18 December 1942 Nazi forces raided the Catholic church and Monastery of the Sisters of the Poor, among other locations. The Germans had obtained information from the collaborationist Belarusian Central Council, regarding Christian Poles harbouring Jewish fugitives who had managed to escape. The Jewish families were hiding in attics, and in stables, in storerooms, and in greenhouses. The next morning, a priest, Adam Sztark, posthumously recognized as a Righteous Among the Nations, and two nuns that helped him shelter Jewish children, were trucked to Pietrolewicze, on the outskirts of Słonim, and executed by the Germans.

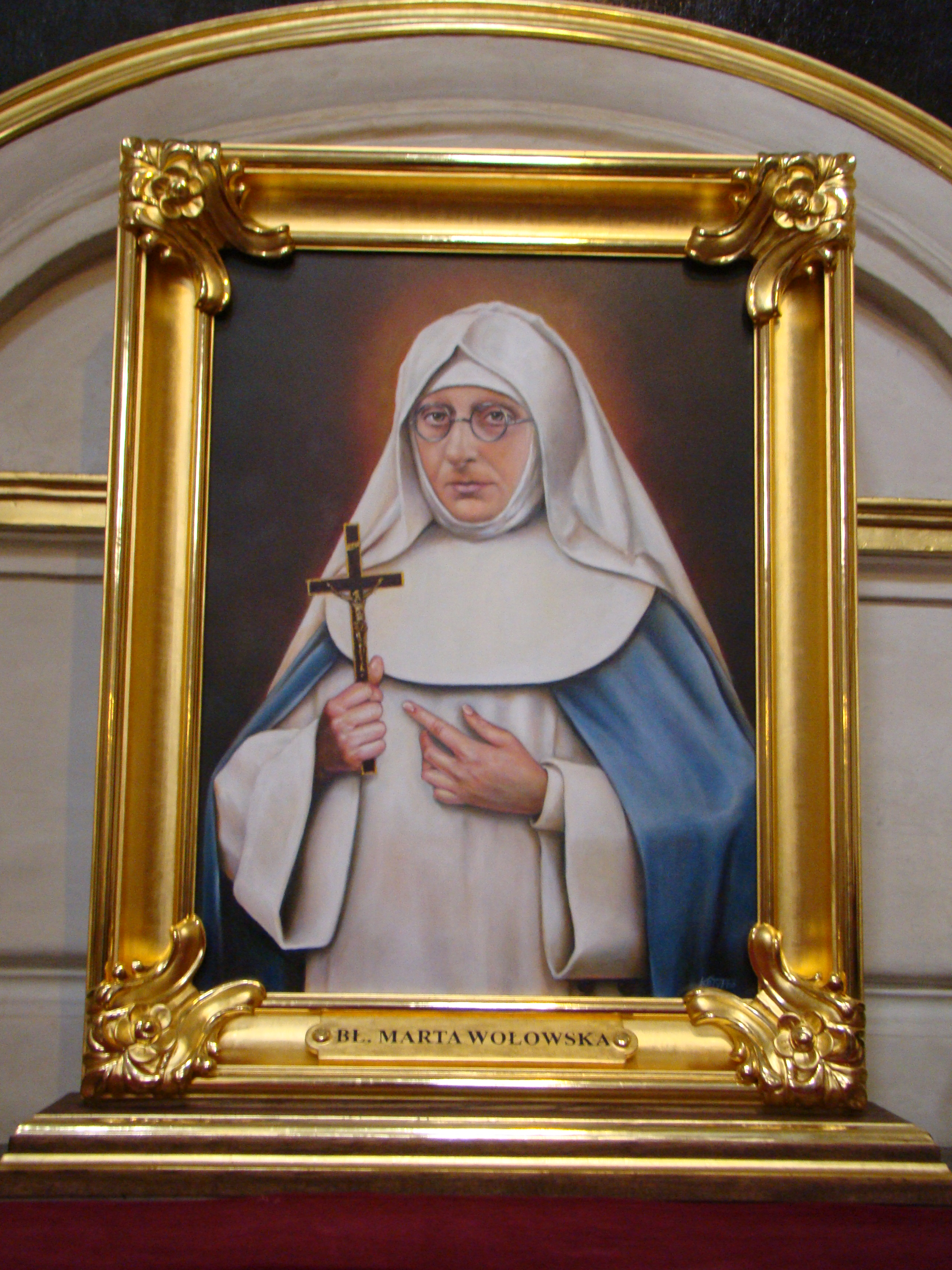
Beatified Marta Wołowska of Słonim, murdered for saving Jews

Three of the Christian victims were beatified by Pope John Paul II on 13 June 1999 in Warsaw, among the 108 Martyrs of World War II. Two of the beatified were Polish nuns from Słonim, executed at Górki Pantalowickie hill on 19 December 1942: Bogumiła Noiszewska, and Maria Marta Kazimiera Wołowska. They had helped and sheltered Jews. Also beatified was the priest, Adam Sztark, who was killed along with them. In 2001, Sztark became the first Polish Jesuit awarded the title of Righteous Among the Nations by the state of Israel. He had delivered food to the ghetto, purchased with cash donations. He also issued false certificates, personally sheltered Jewish refugees, and called upon all his parishioners to help to save the ghetto residents.

The Red Army reached Słonim in mid-July 1944 during Operation Bagration. After World War II ended, Poland's borders were redrawn, according to the demands made by Josef Stalin during Tehran Conference confirmed (as not negotiable) at the Yalta Conference of 1945. Słonim (Cyrillic: Сло́ним) was then incorporated into the Byelorussian SSR of the Soviet Union. The Polish population was expelled and forcibly resettled within the new borders of Poland before the end of 1946. The Jewish community was never restored. Since 1991, Slonim has been one of the district centres of the Grodno Region in sovereign Belarus.

== See also ==
- Łachwa Ghetto and Zdzięcioł Ghetto in occupied eastern Poland
- The emergence of West Belarus
