= Haim Lensky =

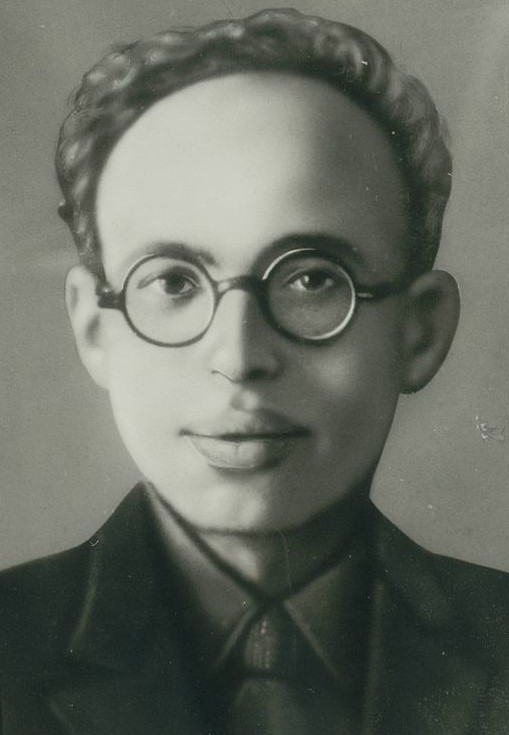
Haim Lensky

Haim Lensky (1905–1943), also Hayyim Lensky, was a Russian poet who wrote in Hebrew. He wrote the bulk of his verse while imprisoned in several Soviet labor camps from 1934 onward.

Lensky was born in the Belarusian town of Slonim and lived in Dziarečyn, Leningrad, and elsewhere. He was one of few Russian Jewish poets to write in Hebrew. Lensky's poems reflect the realities of the camps in which he was imprisoned, the Russian landscape, and literature in a variety of languages and national traditions. He was able to receive books through friends while in the camps, and read poets such as Afanasy Fet and Fyodor Tyutchev.

A few of Lensky's poems were published in Israel during his lifetime, and were first collected there under the title Beyond the River Lethe in 1960.
