= Yehuda Leib Don Yihye =

Belarusian rabbi (1869–1941)

Rabbi Yehuda Leib Don Yihye
- יהודה ליב דון יחיא
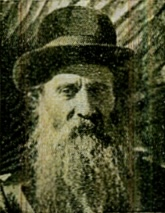
- Yehuda Leib Don Yihye

Personal life
- Born: 14 Elul 5629 (August 1869) Dreyczin, Russian Empire
- Died: 9 Heshvan 5702 (27 November 1941) Tel Aviv, Mandatory Palestine
- Spouse: Musha Sheine (m. 1899)
- Children: Shulamit, Shoshana
- Known for: Combining Hasidism with Litvish eruditeness and Zionism
- Other names: Bródy Henrik, Haim Brody
- Occupation: Rabbi, hasidic leader

Religious life
- Religion: Judaism
- Denomination: Orthodox

Yehuda Leib Don Yihye (14 Elul 5629, August 1869 Dreyczin – 9 Heshvan 5702, 27 November 1941 Tel Aviv) was a Rabbi, Hassid and student of Volozhin Yeshiva affiliated with the Mizrahi Movement. He was a unique rabbinical character, and combined Hassidism with Litvish and Brisker eruditeness and with Zionism.

== Biography ==
Don Yihye was born in Dreyczin (today in Belarus) to a Chabad family, his father serving as the town rabbi. In his youth he studied at his uncle Eliezer Don Yihye, the chief rabbi of Lucyn (who taught Rabbi Kook for a certain period), and later at Volozhin Yeshiva where he learned mostly from Rabbi Hayim of Brisk and was deeply influenced by his unique teaching method – the Brisk Method. During his studies at the Yeshiva, Don Yihye joined the secret Zionist Netzah Israel association where he met future renowned poet Hayim Nahman Bialik.

Abba Balosher in his essay "Bialik at Volozhin" describes an anonymous student, probably Don Yihye, in the following way: "A second man from Poland, of a Hassidic family, who has become despaired of the rabbinite, master of the Bible, Aggadah and Hebrew language, dealt with writing a Hebrew grammar and prepared himself for teaching, not of what is forbidden and permitted, but of reading and writing. He was a Hovev Zion and joined a secret association at the Yeshiva which existence was known only to a distinguished few". Balosher continues "there was a man at the Yeshiva who was called "the Zhytomiran" and his friends would call him Hayim Nahman. A distinct friend of the Polish man". Don Yihye adored his rabbi, Hayim of Brisk, to the point that even after the shutdown of the Yeshiva in 1892 he returned with him to Brisk where Hayim served as the town rabbi. In 1899 he married Musha Sheine (born 1875), the daughter of rabbi Shlomo HaCohen who was the rabbi of Vilna, and later served at the rabbinite of his birthplace Dreyczin, Chernigov and Shklov where he was the rabbi of the hassidic community for 10 years between 1901–1911.

Later, Don Yihye became an enthusiastic activist for Zionism and supported the Mizrahi Movement. He participated in the founding convention of the movement in 1902 with his father-in-law, rabbi Shlomo HaCohen, and his brother-in-law, rabbi Nahum Grinhoiz who was the rabbi of Troki, and signed the foundational declaration of the movement along with 67 other renowned rabbis from across Europe. With the help of Rabbi Kook, Don Yihye made aliyah to the Land of Israel and lived in Tel Aviv until his death in 1941.

The Don Yihye couple had two daughters: Shulamit (born 1911) and Shoshana (born 1913), who married rabbi Yitzhak Neiman.

== See also ==
- Don Yihye Family
