= Slonim district =

District of Grodno region, Belarus

Slonim district Слонімскі раён (Belarusian) Слонимский район (Russian)
- District
- Flag Coat of arms

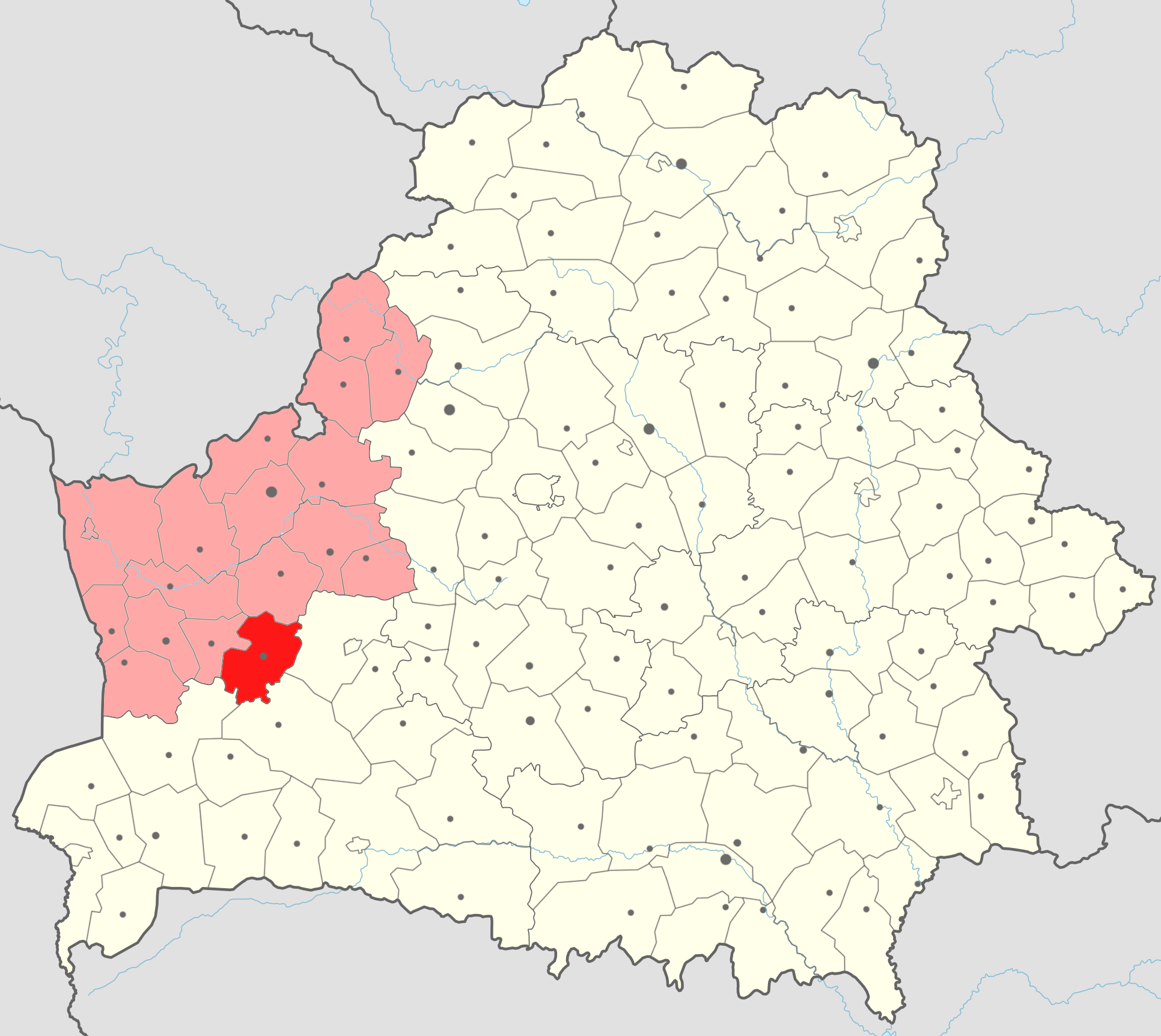
- Coordinates: 53°05′N 25°19′E
- Country: Belarus
- Region: Grodno region
- Administrative center: Slonim

Area
  - District: 1,470.63 km^{2} (567.81 sq mi)

Population (2024)
  - District: 60,845
  - Density: 41.373/km^{2} (107.16/sq mi)
  - Urban: 48,907
  - Rural: 11,938
- Time zone: UTC+3 (MSK)

Slonim district (Belarusian: Слонімскі раён; Russian: Слонимский район) is a district (raion) of Grodno region in Belarus. The administrative center is Slonim. As of 2024, it has a population of 60,845.

== Notable residents ==
- Michał Wołłowicz (1806, Parečča estate — 1833) - participant of the November Uprising
