= Isa (river) =

- Native name: Іса (Belarusian)

Location
- Country: Belarus

Physical characteristics
- Mouth: Shchara
  - coordinates: 53.1068°N 25.3299°E

Basin features
- Progression: Shchara→ Neman→ Baltic Sea

The Isa (Belarusian: Іса) is a river of Belarus. It is a right tributary of the Shchara, which it joins in the city of Slonim in western Belarus.
