= Miriam Raskin =

Belarusian-born Yiddish-language writer

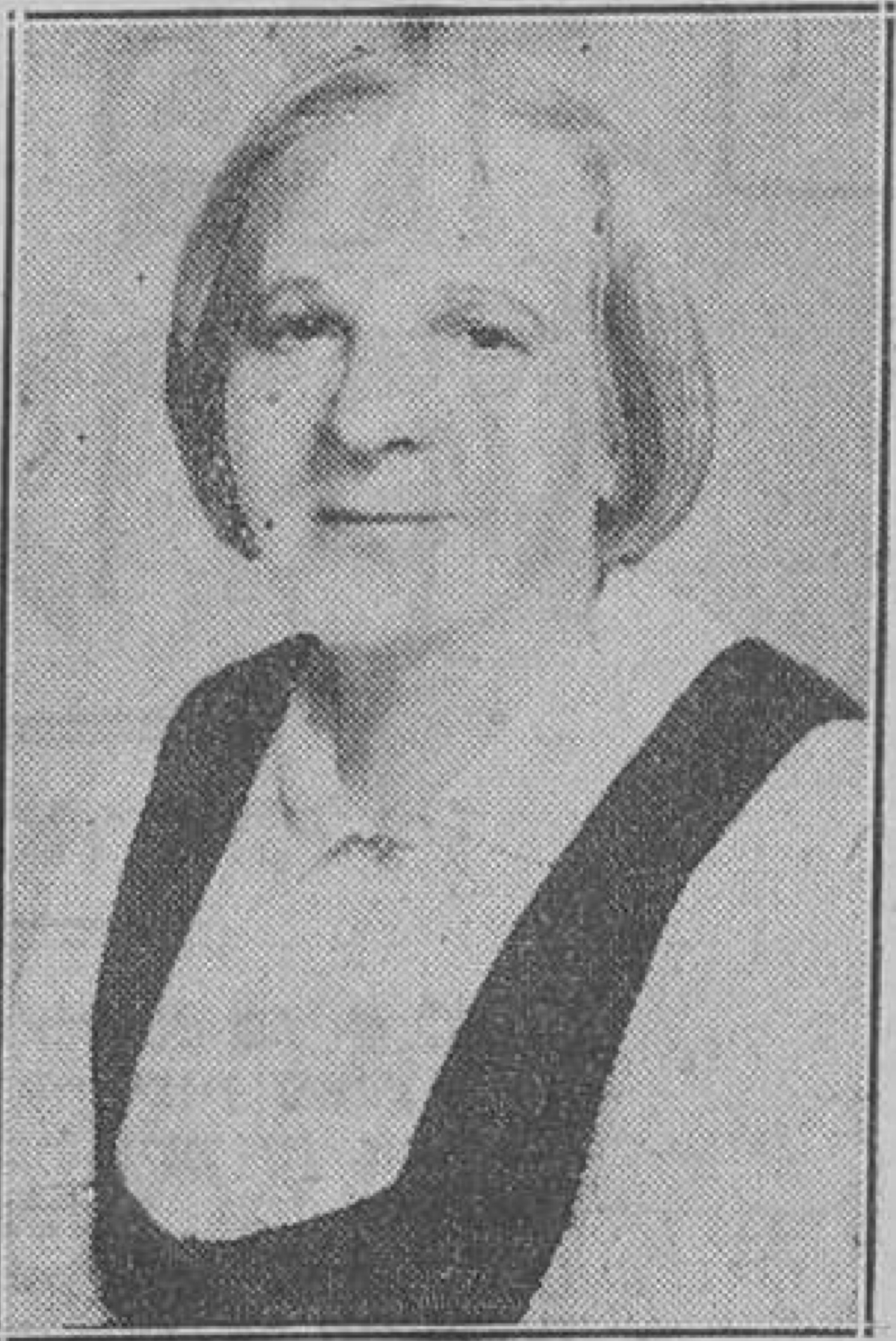

Miriam Raskin (1889 – October 18, 1973) was a Yiddish-language writer.

== Biography ==
Raskin was born in Slonim, Belarus in 1889. As a teenager, Raskin was an active member of the socialist General Jewish Labor Bund, participating in the 1905 Revolution. As a result of this political activism, she was imprisoned for a year in St. Petersburg. Raskin would fictionalize this experience in her 1951 novel Zlatke. The book used "religious language and metaphor to express Zlatke's revolutionary fevour" She also addressed her Bundist activism in her later book Tsen yor lebn, written as a series of diary entries.

In 1920 Raskin emigrated to America, where she began to publish short stories in Di Tsukunft and Forverts. In her later years she lived in the Shalom Aleichem Houses in the Bronx, run by the Arbeter-Ring.

== Bibliography ==
Novels:

- Tsen yor lebn: di finfte yorn. New York: Frayhayt, 1927.
- A farshpetigte libe. Serialized in Forverts from December 5, 1948.
- A lebn fun troymen. Serialized in Forverts from December 9, 1950.
- Zlatke. New York: Unzer tsayt, 1951.
- Bay a fremdn fayer. Serialized in Forverts from July 1, 1951.
- Zeyn tsveyte veyb. Serialized in Forverts from December 6, 1952.
- A yor nokh der khsunh. Serialized in Forverts from October 22, 1954.
- A farbotene libe. Serialized in Forverts from April 20, 1956.
- Di mishpokhe Epelboym. Serialized in Forverts from February 28, 1958.
- Di shenste teg fun ir lebn. Serialized in Forverts from January 29, 1960.
- A hoyz in di Bronks. Serialized in Forverts from August 17, 1962.

Short story collections:

- Shtile lebns. New York: A grupe fraynt, 1941.

Stories in English translation:

- "Zlatke" in Found Treasures: Stories by Yiddish Women Writers
- "At a Picnic" in Found Treasures: Stories by Yiddish Women Writers
- "In the Shadows" in New Yorkish: And Other American Yiddish Stories
- "No Way Out" in New Yorkish: And Other American Yiddish Stories
- "Generation of the Wilderness" in New Yorkish: And Other American Yiddish Stories
- "In the Automat" in Have I Got a Story for You: More Than a Century of Fiction from The Forward
- "She Wants to be Different" in Have I Got a Story for You: More Than a Century of Fiction from The Forward
