= Slonim =

Town in Grodno Region, Belarus

Slonim Слонім (Belarusian) Слоним (Russian)
- Town
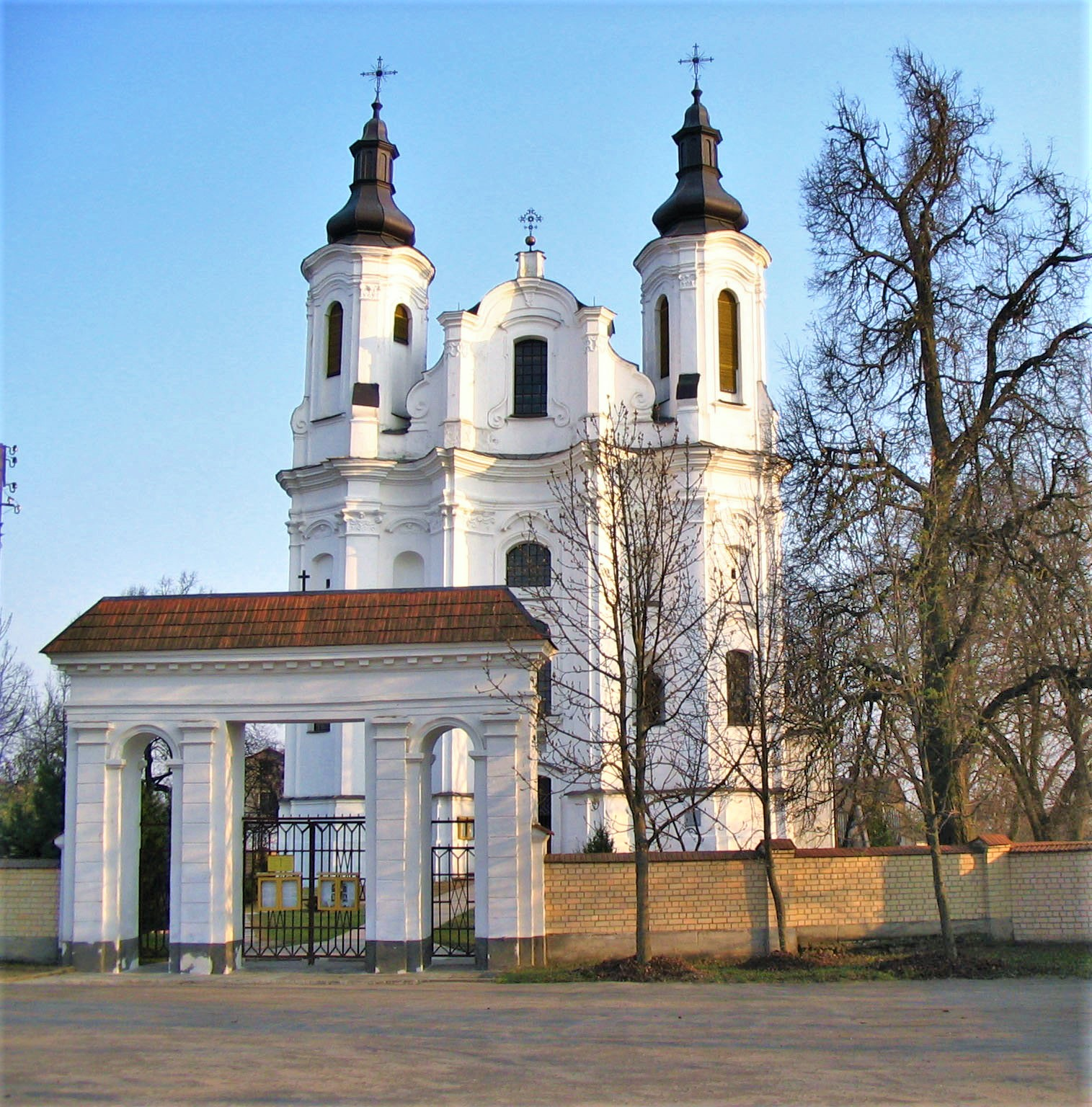
- St Andrew's Church

- Flag Coat of arms

- Location within Belarus
- Coordinates: 53°05′N 25°19′E
- Country: Belarus
- Region: Grodno Region
- District: Slonim District
- Founded: 1036
- Town rights: 1532

Government
  - Mayor: Aleh Tarhonsky
- Elevation: 156 m (512 ft)

Population (2025)
  - Total: 48,402
- Time zone: UTC+3 (MSK)
- Postal code: 231800
- Area code: +375 1562
- License plate: 4
- Website: Official website

Slonim (Note: Belarusian: Слонім; Russian: Слоним; Lithuanian: Slanimas; Latvian: Sloņima; Polish: Słonim; Yiddish: סלאָנים.) is a town in Grodno Region, in western Belarus. It serves as the administrative center of Slonim District. It is located at the junction of the Shchara and Isa rivers, 143 km (89 mi) southeast of Grodno. As of 2025, it has a population of 48,402.

== Etymology and historical names ==
Slonim has been known by several versions of its name as spoken by speakers of various languages: Сло́нім ( Belarusian), Słonim (Polish), Сло́ним (Russian). Slonim was first mentioned by scribes in chronicles in 1252 as Uslonim and in 1255 as Vslonim. According to one account (which is also considered by some to be an official one), the name of the city originates from the Slavic word zaslona (a screen), implying that the city once functioned as an outpost at the southern border of the Grand Duchy of Lithuania.

== History ==
=== Middle Ages ===
The earliest record is of a wooden fort on the left bank of the Shchara river in the 11th century, although there may have been earlier settlement.

The area was disputed between the Grand Duchy of Lithuania and Kievan Rus' in early history and it changed hands several times. In 1040, the Kievans won control of the area after a battle but lost Slonim to the Lithuanians in 1103. The Ruthenians retook the area early in the 13th century but were expelled by a Tatar invasion in 1241 and the town was pillaged. When, later in the year, the Tatars withdrew, Slonim became part of the Grand Duchy of Lithuania once again, in personal union with the Kingdom of Poland after the Union of Krewo of 1385.

=== Early modern period ===
Slonim was the location of one of many Roman Catholic churches where the priests had to know the Lithuanian language according to the Grand Duke of Lithuania Alexander Jagiellon in 1501. In 1532 King Sigismund I of Poland granted Slonim town rights. In 1558, King Sigismund II Augustus, in a privilege issued in Vilnius, established two two-week fairs.

In 1569, the Polish–Lithuanian union was transformed into a single state and Słonim became an important regional centre within the newly established Polish–Lithuanian Commonwealth. Administratively it was part of the Nowogródek Voivodeship. Thanks to the efforts of nobleman, statesman and Słonim starost Lew Sapieha, King Sigismund III Vasa renewed the town rights of Słonim and granted the city coat of arms, which included the Lis coat of arms of Sapieha. Also thanks to Lew Sapieha, from 1631 to 1685 the city flourished as the seat of the Lithuanian diet.

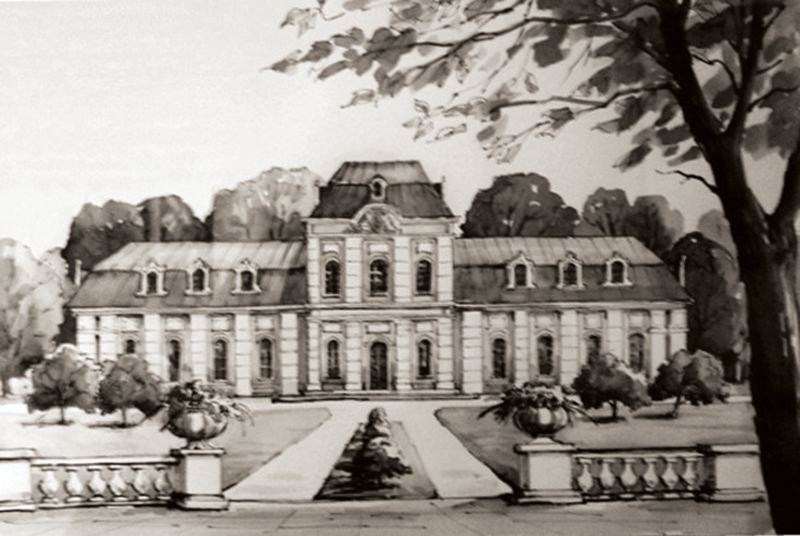
The Ogiński Theater around 1800

The wars had damaged Slonim, but in the 18th century, a local landowner, count Ogiński, encouraged the recovery of the area; a canal was dug to connect the Shchara with the Dnieper river, now known as the Oginski Canal. Ogiński also built a greater complex, combining an opera theater, a school of music and a school of ballet, and a printing house.

=== Late modern period ===
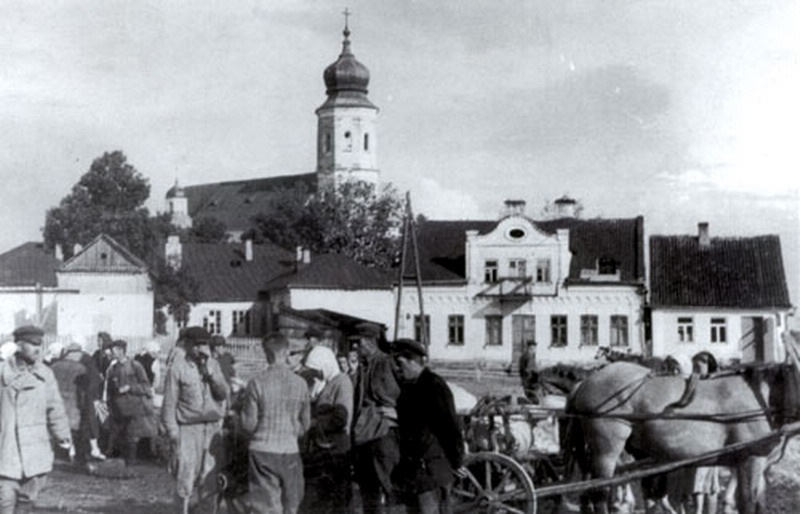
Polish Słonim in the 1930s, market at Bernardyńska Street before World War II

The Polish–Lithuanian Commonwealth was dismantled in a series of three "partitions" in the second half of the 18th century and divided among its neighbours, Prussia, Habsburg Austria and Russian Empire which took the largest portion of the territory. Slonim was in the area annexed by Russia in 1795. Administratively it was part of the Slonim Governorate until 1797, Vilna Governorate until 1801 and Grodno Governorate until World War I. In 1897 it was the fourth largest city of the governorate after the leading cities of Białystok, Grodno and Brześć.

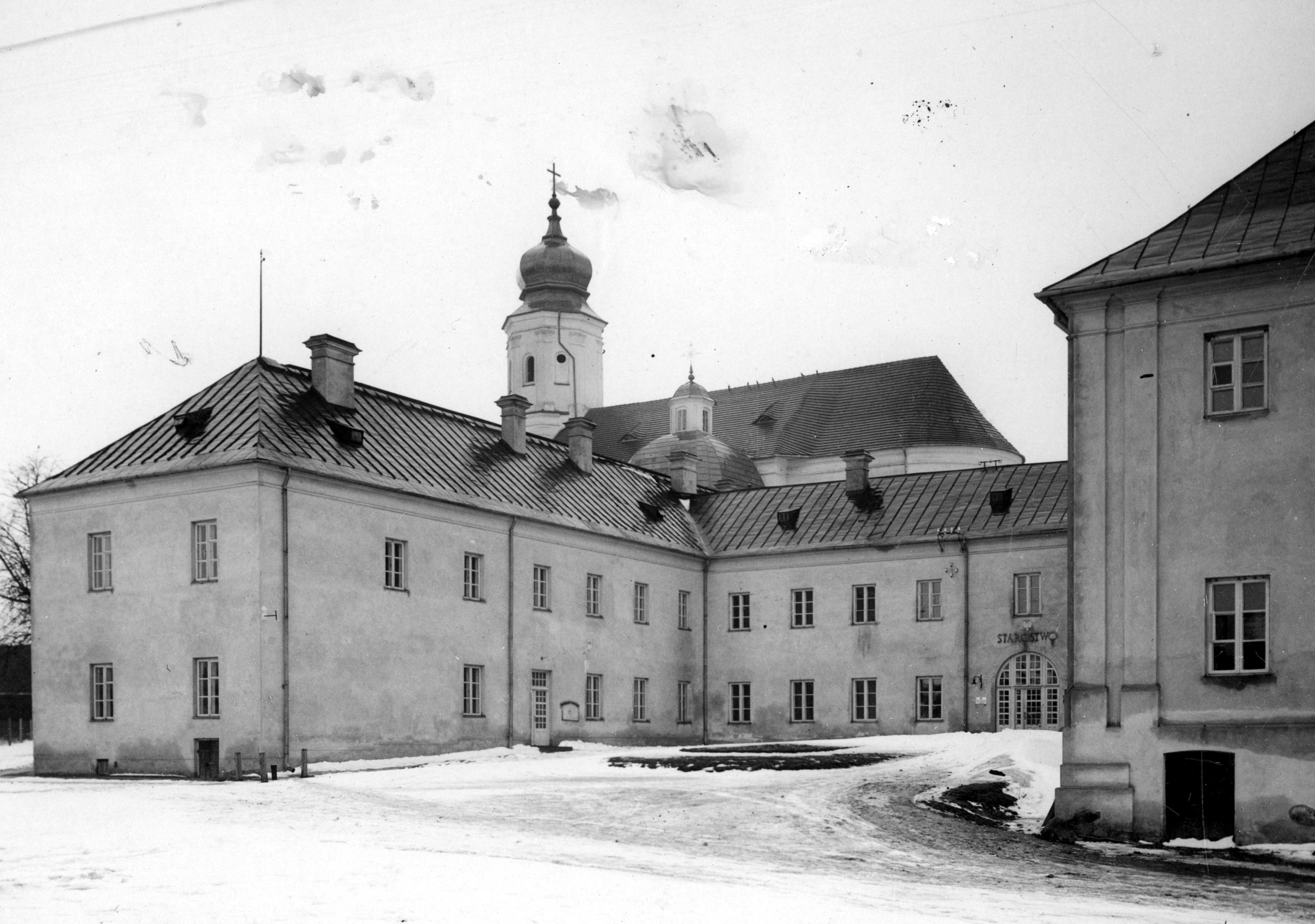
Pre-war Polish county office

Russian control lasted until 1915, when the German army captured the town. After the First World War, the Slonim area was disputed between the Soviet Union and the newly recreated state of Poland. The town suffered badly in the Polish-Soviet war of 1920. It was ceded by the Bolsheviks to Poland in the 1921 Peace of Riga and became a part of Nowogródek Voivodeship of the Second Polish Republic.

Slonim was one of the many towns in Poland that had a significant Jewish population. The imposing Great Synagogue, built in 1642, survived the destruction and brutal Nazi liquidation of the Słonim Ghetto with 10,000 Jews massacred in 1942 alone. The 10 small synagogues around the Great Synagogue called Stiblach did not survive.

=== World War II and the post-war period ===
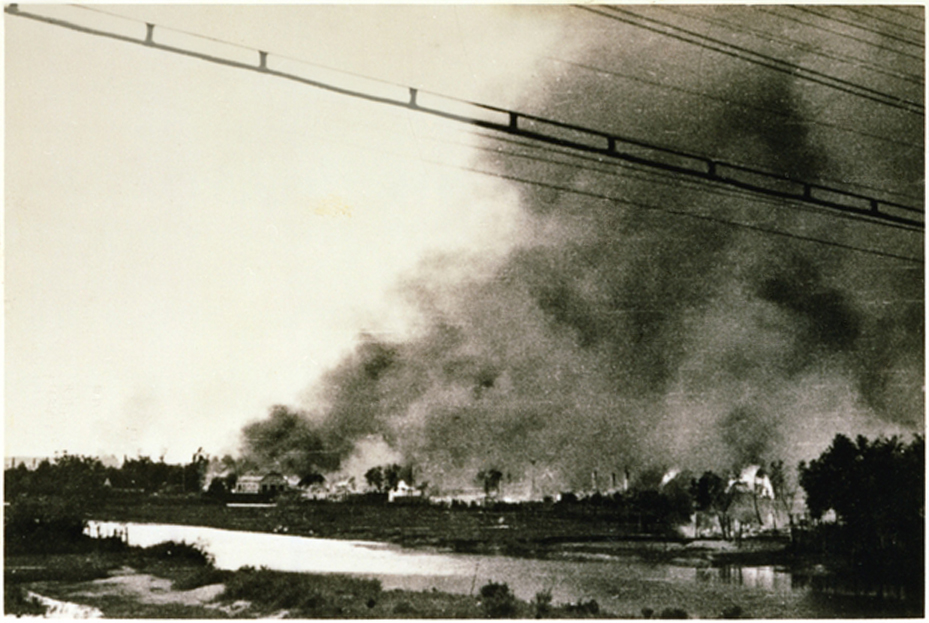
Słonim Ghetto burning in 1942 during the Jewish revolt during German occupation of Poland

In 1939, the Molotov–Ribbentrop Pact between Nazi Germany and the Soviet Union resulted in the invasion of Poland by the two powers and its division between them. Slonim was in the area designated by the Pact to fall within the Soviet sphere of influence. The Soviets placed that area within the Byelorussian SSR. Two years later, Germany invaded the Soviets (Operation Barbarossa) and Slonim was captured. The Słonim Jews were herded into the Słonim Ghetto set up at the Na Wyspie neighbourhood across the bridge on the Szczara River. Soon thereafter, 70% of Slonim's Jews had been killed by the Einsatzgruppen, including 9,000 on 14 November 1941. The second mass murder of 8,000 Jews took place in 1942. From August 1942 to November 1943, the occupiers operated a forced labour camp for Jewish men in the town.

In 1944, on the insistence of Joseph Stalin in Yalta the Soviet Union retained possession of the eastern parts of pre-war Poland including Słonim, as agreed between the Allies. The Polish population was forcibly resettled to new post-war Polish boundaries before the end of 1946.

After the dissolution of the Soviet Union, Slonim became part of an independent state of Belarus.

In 2019 a Soviet-era statue of Vladimir Lenin in the city center was replaced with a new monument of Lew Sapieha.

=== Historic population ===
The population of Slonim fluctuated, influenced by local prosperity and wars {1883, 21,110; 1897 15,893}. Jewish settlement in Slonim appears to have started in 1388, following encouragement from the Lithuanian authorities. They were credited with the development of local commerce in the 15th century, nonetheless, they were temporarily expelled by the Duchy in 1503. In the late 19th century, Slonim's Jewish population had risen to more than 10,000. The Slonimer Hasidic dynasty came from there. Michael and Ephraim Marks (of Marks & Spencer) were born in Slonim.

The wealthiest family in Slonim before World War II were the Rabinowicz brothers, Vigdor and Yossel. Their parents were Dov-Ber and Rivka Rochel (née Kancepolski). After World War I, they entered the forestry business together with Yaakov Milikowski, and were known as the Rabmils. They escaped the Nazi atrocities by flying to Mandatory Palestine.

== Economy ==
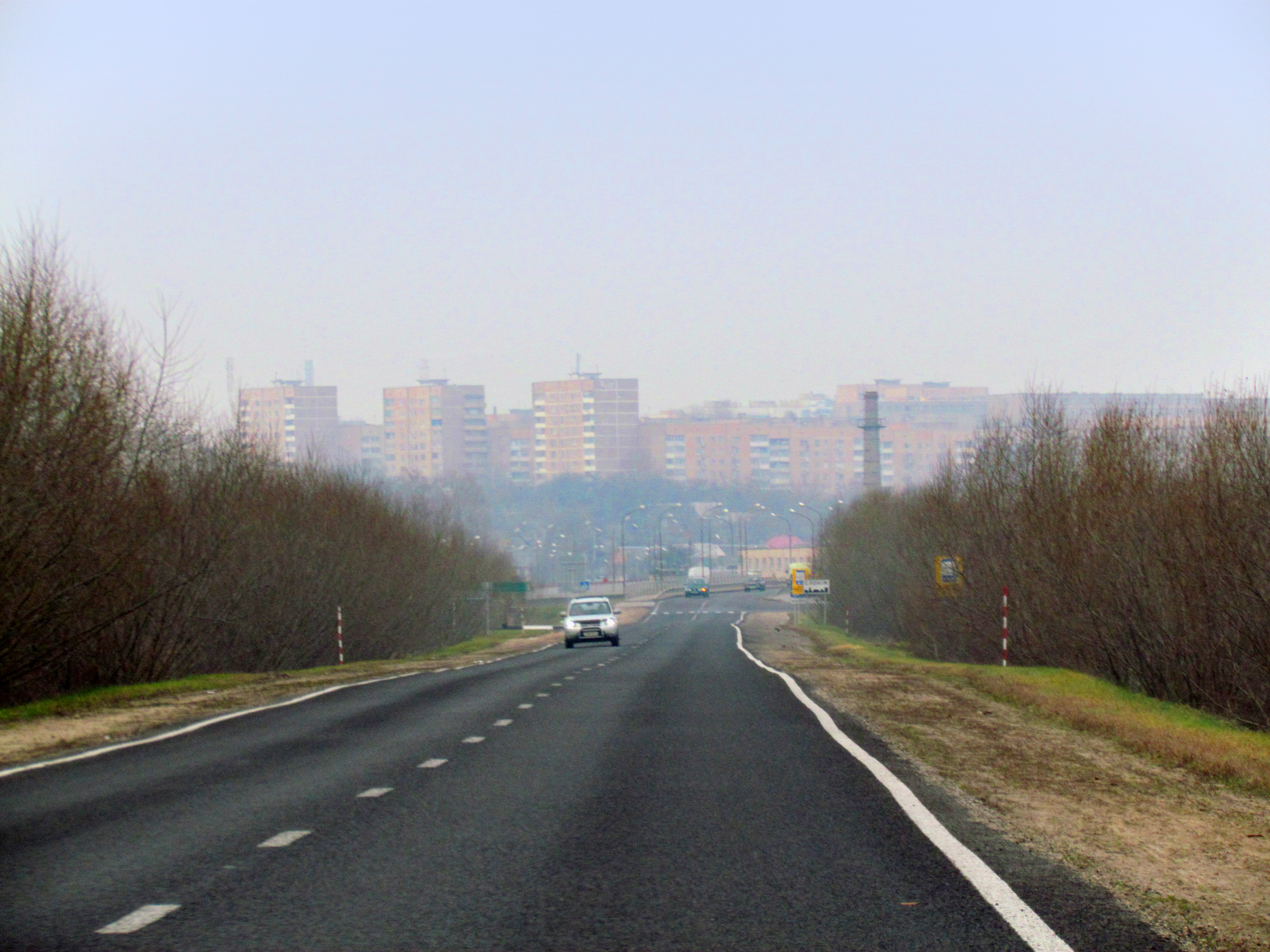
Slonim skyline from the road to Baranavichy

Slonim's importance derives from the river, which is navigable and joins the Oginski canal, connecting the Niemen with the Dnieper.

Slonim has varied food, consumer, and engineering industries. Corn, tar, and especially timber are exported. There is the Slonim artistic goods factory, a worsted factory and “Textilschik”, a paperboard factory, motor- and car-repair plants, a dry non-fat milk factory and meat processing plant. There are also flax preprocessing, feed mill and woodworking enterprises in the town.

The 11th Guards Mechanized Brigade, withdrawn from Germany in 1992, is stationed in the town.

== Media ==
Slonim's biggest newspaper is the independent Gazeta Slonimskaya (Газета Слонімская). Founded in 1997, it is a weekly newspaper with a circulation over 5,000 copies. It is published every Wednesday, and contains local and regional news, sections on sport, culture and lifestyle, and local advertising. It is currently 40 pages, plus an additional weekly 8-page supplement called Otdushina (Отдушина), focusing on youth, culture and religious affairs. The newspaper is written in both Russian and Belarusian.

An earlier Gazeta Slonimskaya was originally published in 1938 and 1939, at that time in Polish.

Another local newspaper is Slonimski Vesnik. Being a state owned newspaper, it is run and censored by local authorities. Slonimski Vesnik is published three times a week and has a circulation of around 3,000 copies.

== Transport and infrastructure ==
Slonim has road-links with Baranovichi, Ivatsevichi, Ruzhany, Volkovysk, and Lida. There are around a dozen bus routes in Slonim and half a dozen of mini-bus routes. Taxi services are widely available. Slonim is on the railway line between Baranavichy and Vaukavysk.

== Notable buildings ==
Historic sights of Slonim (examples)

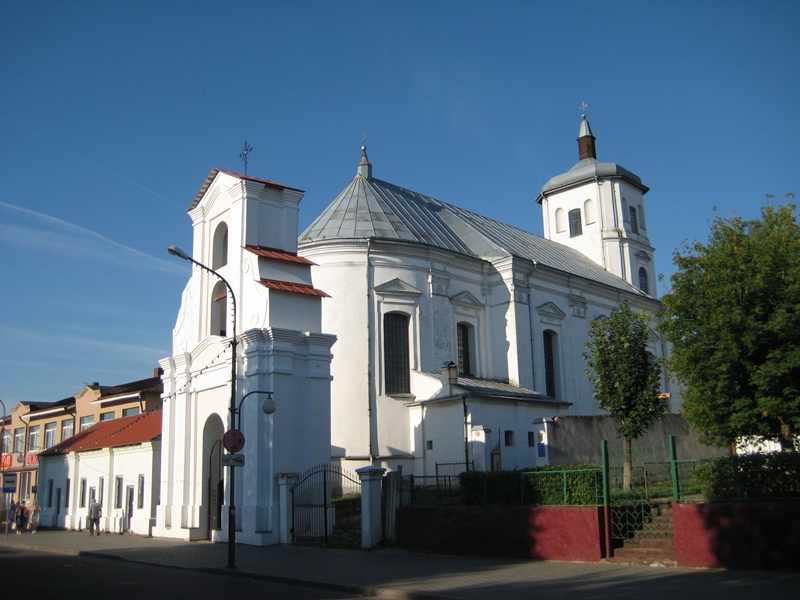
Church of the Immaculate Conception

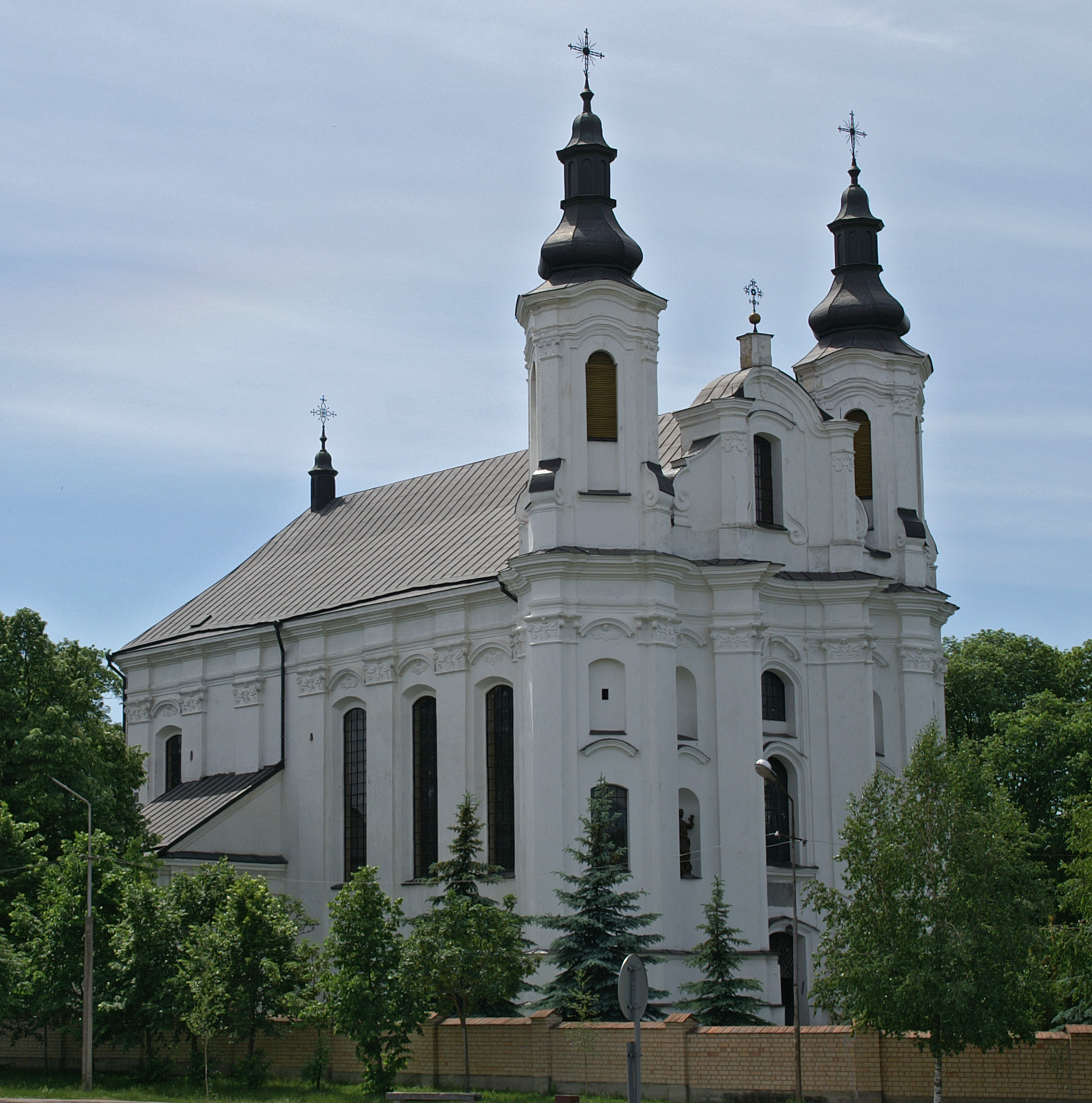
Saint Andrew church

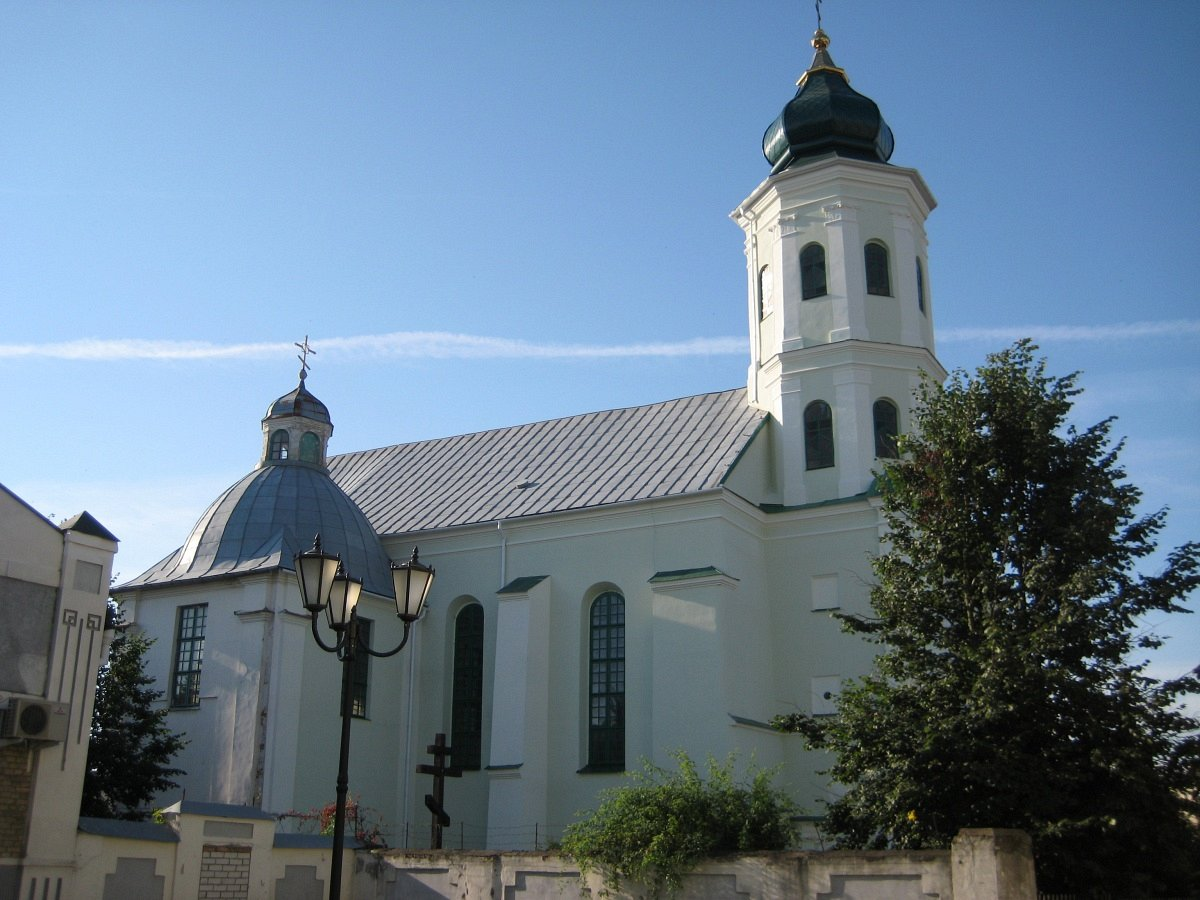
Holy Trinity church

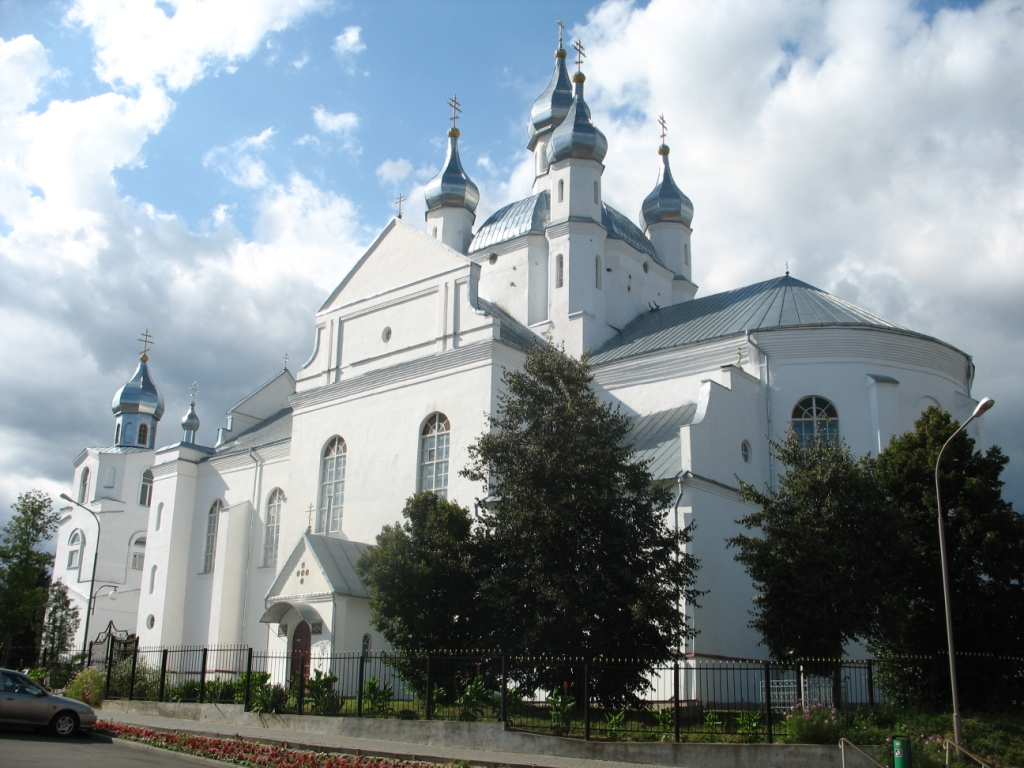
Church of the Transfiguration

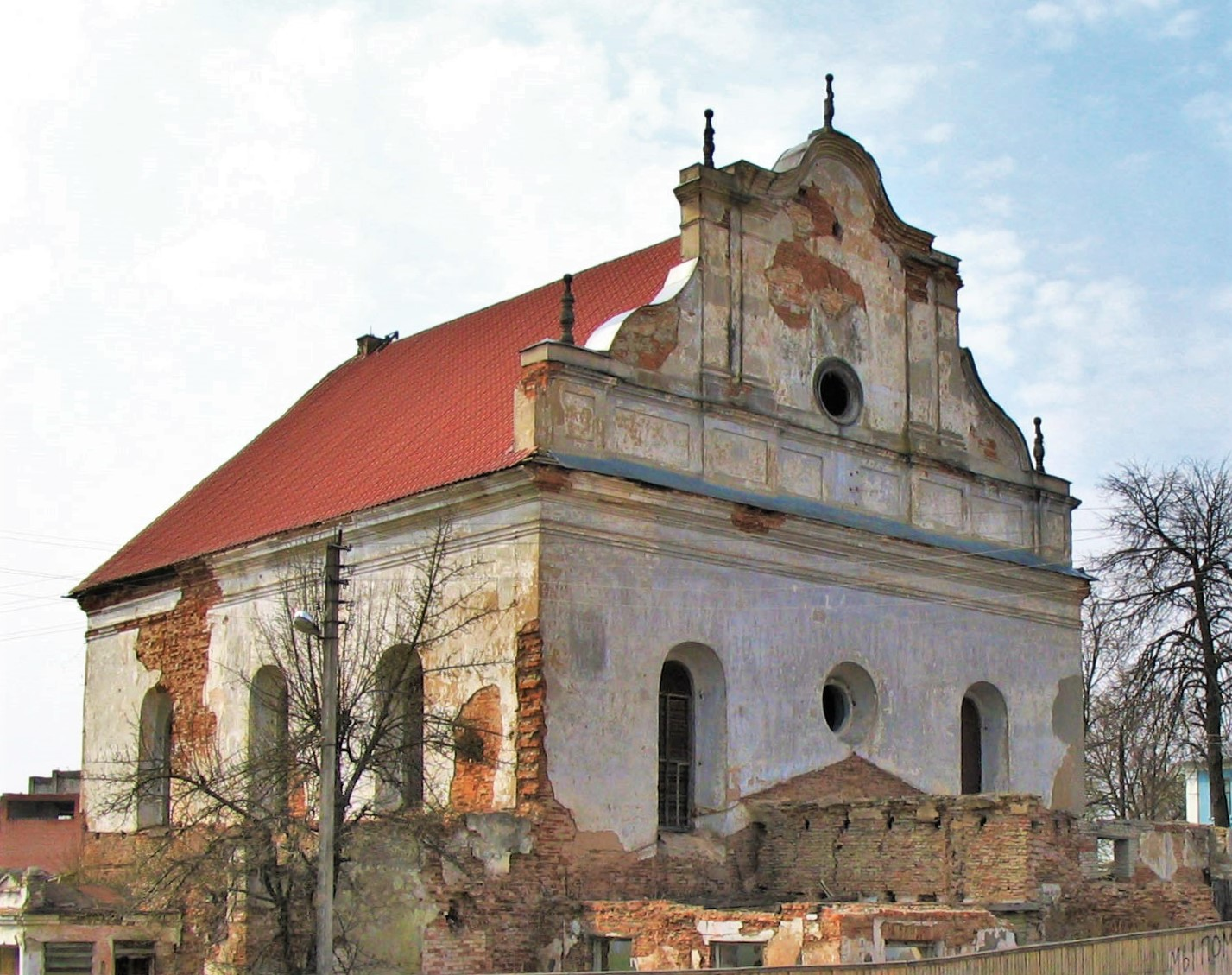
Great Synagogue of Slonim

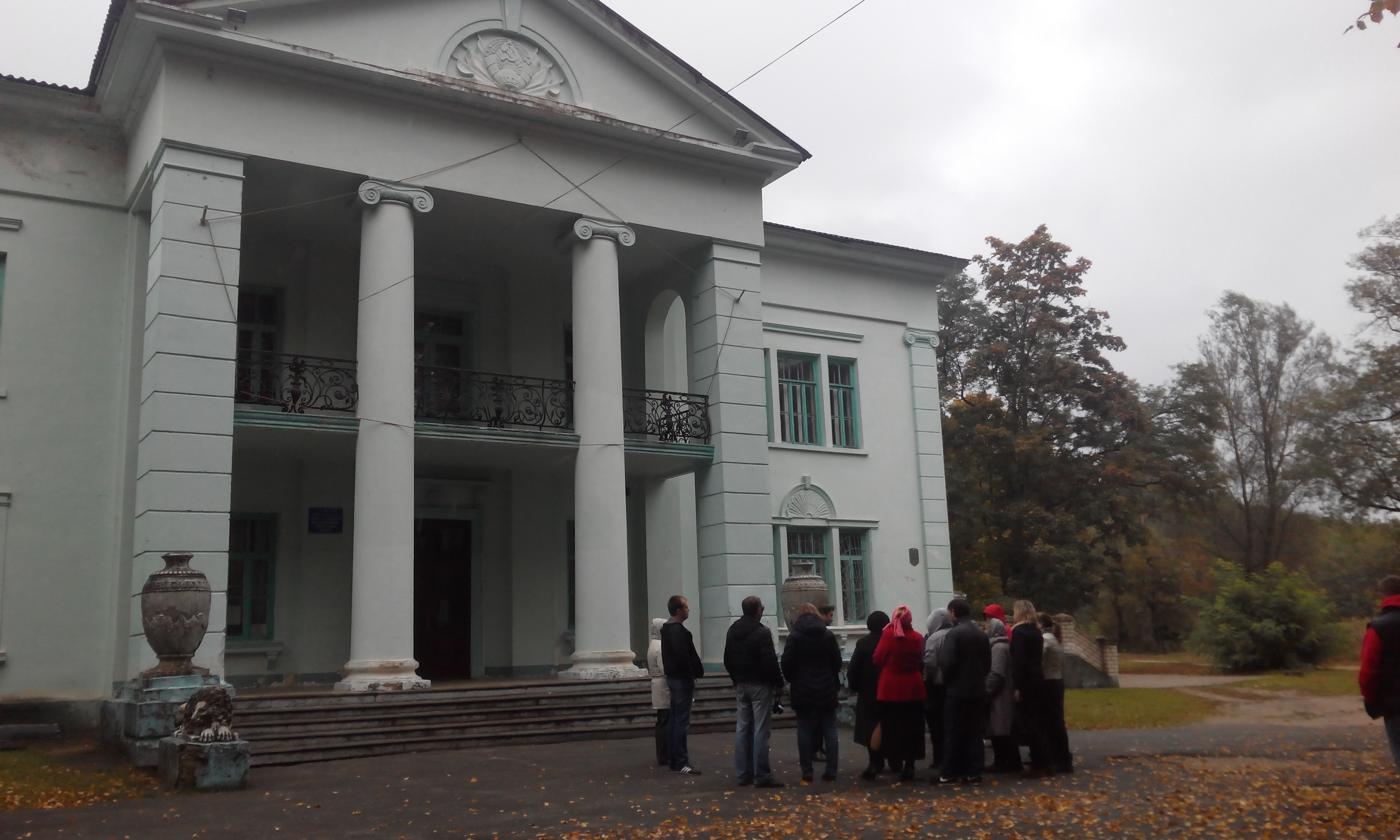
Puslouski Palace

- Orthodox church of the Holy Trinity (former Catholic church of the Holy Trinity, Baroque)
- Convent of the Benedictines
- Chapel of St. Dominick
- St Andrew's Church (Baroque)
- Catholic church of the Immaculate Conception of Blessed Virgin Mary and the convent of Bernardine
- Orthodox church of Transfiguration (former Catholic church), Baroque, dating back to the 17th century
- The Great Synagogue of Slonim, building of a former major synagogue of a large Jewish community that used to live in Slonim before the Second World War. The building is in a dilapidated condition. It is listed by the private World Monuments Fund as their top priority site of Jewish interest in Eastern Europe that requires restoration. The building was left untouched by the German Luftwaffe during World War II, but it has subsequently deteriorated and is now in urgent need of protection and restoration. British TV personality Natasha Kaplinsky was the subject of one of a series of BBC television programmes, Who Do You Think You Are?. Kaplinsky visited the synagogue, it having been the place of worship of her great-grandparents. Her cousin sang a lament in Hebrew in the synagogue.

Slonim has also a theatre and a museum of regional studies, as well as a medical school. There is a new recreation area development in north-east Slonim called Enka. The main sports are: running, gymnastics, football and ice hockey. The telecommunication guyed mast, 350 metres (1,150 ft) tall, for FM-/TV-broadcasting is located at Novaya Strazha (53°03′53″N 25°28′31″E). Northeast of Slonim, there is a CHAYKA-transmitter.

== Notable people ==
- Samuel Hirszhorn (1876–1942), Polish-Jewish writer, journalist, and politician, born in Slonim
- Haim Lensky (1905–1943), Russian-Jewish poet
- Michael Marks (1859–1907), Jewish businessman and entrepreneur, and co-founder of the British retail chain Marks & Spencer
- Miriam Raskin (1889–1973), Yiddish writer, born in Slonim.
- Michal Smajewski, known as Michel Sima (1912-1987), sculptor, photographer

== See also ==
- Anshe Slonim Synagogue on the Lower East Side of Manhattan, New York

== Sources ==
- Cholawski, Shalom. Slonim in Encyclopaedia of the Holocaust vol. 4, pp. 1363–1364. Map.
