= St Andrew's Church, Slonim =

St Andrew's Church
- Касцёл святога Андрэя апостала
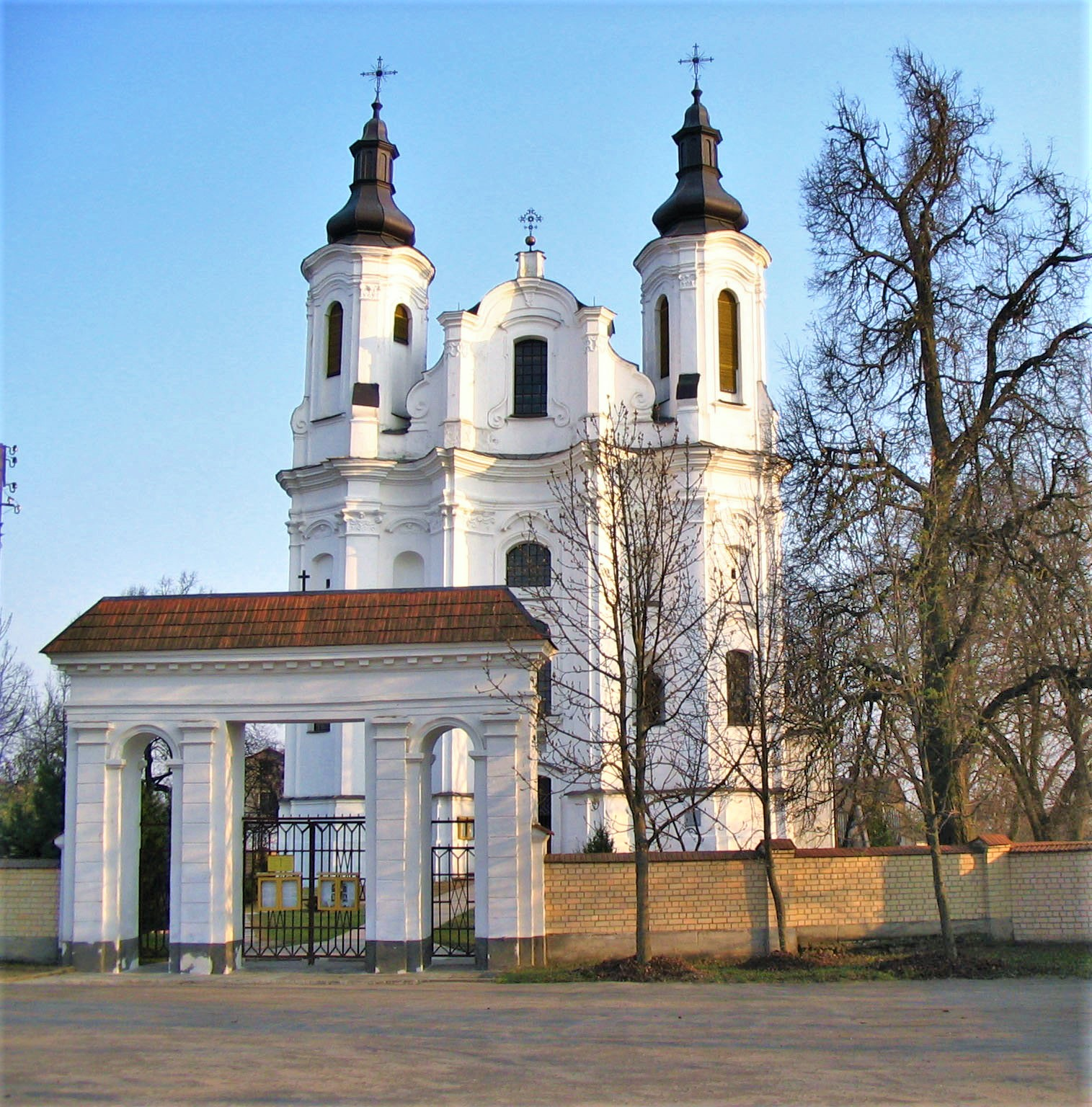
- St Andrew's Church
- 53°05′51″N 25°19′48″E
- Location: Slonim
- Country: Belarus
- Denomination: Roman Catholic church

History
- Status: Active

Architecture
- Style: Baroque
- Completed: 1770—1775

Administration
- Diocese: Roman Catholic Diocese of Grodno

St Andrew's Church (Belarusian: Касцёл Святога Андрэя, Polish: Kościół św. Andrzeja) in Slonim is a Roman Catholic church built in 1775, a monument of Belarusian cultural heritage.

== Description ==
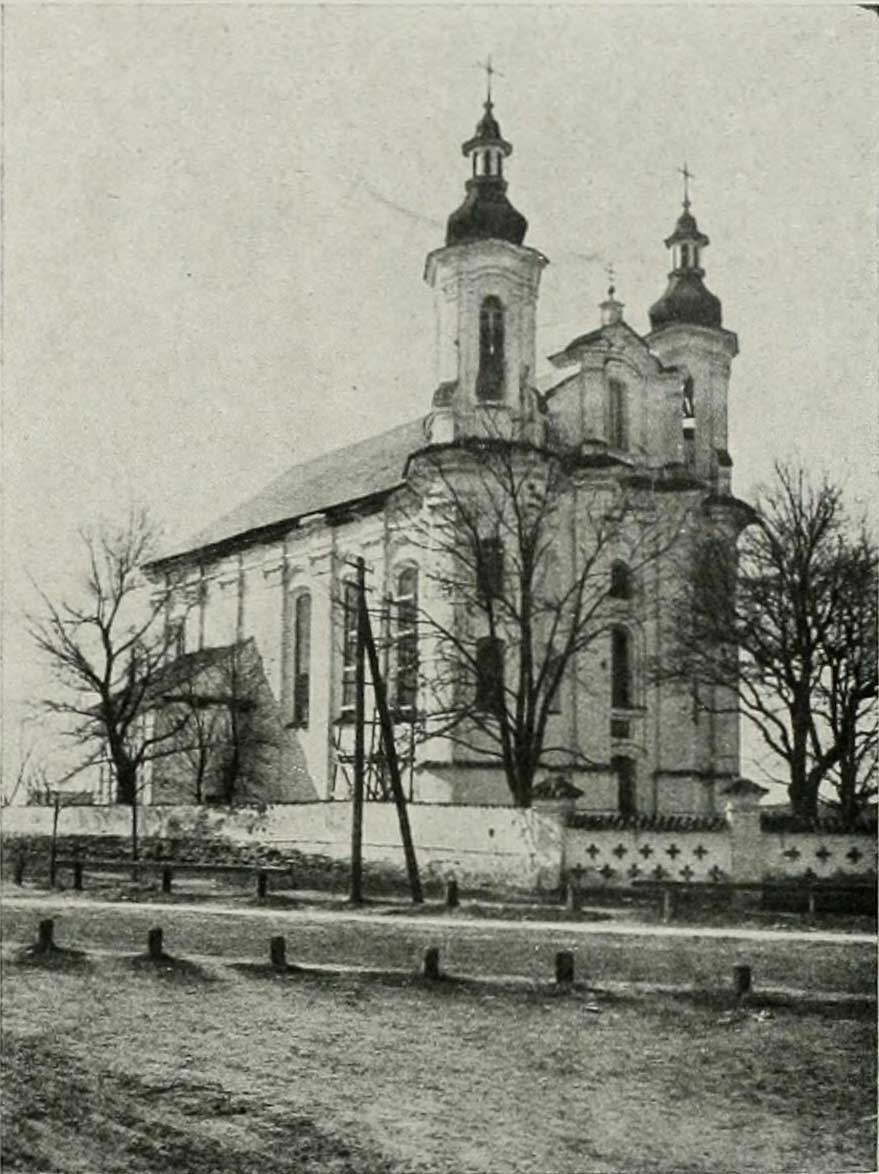
The church before 1917

In 1490 the king Casimir IV Jagiellon constructed the first wooden Catholic church in Slonim. It was consecrated in 1493 and worked until the Russo-Polish war of 1654-1667 when it was destroyed by fire. After that catholic masses in Slonim were served in a small chapel. The construction of a new stone church started in 1770 and lasted five years. The new building was completed and consecrated in 1775.

The church has 14 meters high nave and two small sacristies on both sides of the chancel. The facade is supported by two symmetrical towers. Statues of St Peter and St Paul are placed in the niches near the main entrance. The main altar is decorated in Rococo style.

The church was almost destroyed during World War I but reconstructed after the war. After World War II Slonim became a part of the USSR and was soon closed by order of the Soviet government. The building was used as a food storage facility.

After the dissolution of the Soviet Union and restoration of Catholicism in Belarus, the church was returned to the local parish, reconstructed and re-opened in 1993.
