= Shchara =

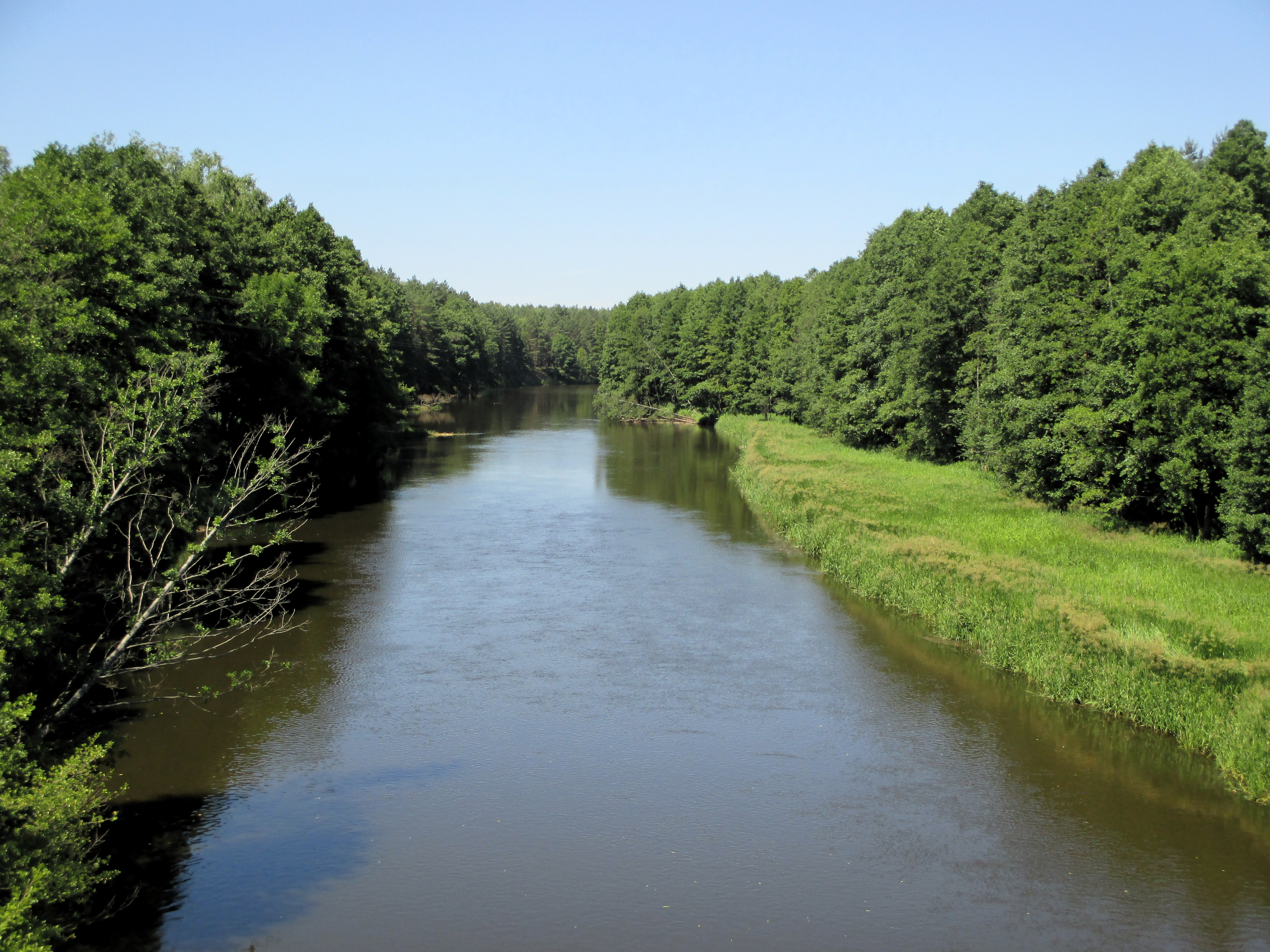

Location
- Country: Belarus

Physical characteristics
- Source
  - location: Grodno Region
- Mouth: Neman
  - coordinates: 53.4402°N 24.7388°E
- Length: 300 km (190 mi)
- Basin size: 6,730 km^{2} (2,600 sq mi)
- Discharge
  - average: 31 m^{3}/s (1,100 cu ft/s)

Basin features
- Progression: Neman→ Baltic Sea

The Shchara (Belarusian: Шчара, romanized: Ščara, pronounced [ˈʂtʂara]; Russian: Щара) is a river in Belarus, and a left tributary of the Neman. This 300 km (190 mi) long river's catchment area is 6,730 km^{2} (2,600 mi^{2}). The Shchara is the 5th longest river in Belarus.

It flows through the city of Slonim.

== Main tributaries ==
Right: Lipnyanka, Myshanka, Lakhazva, Isa, Padyavarka.

Left: Vedma, Grivda, Lukonitsa, Sipa.
