= Dzyarechyn =

Dzyarechyn Дзярэчын (Belarusian)
- Agrotown
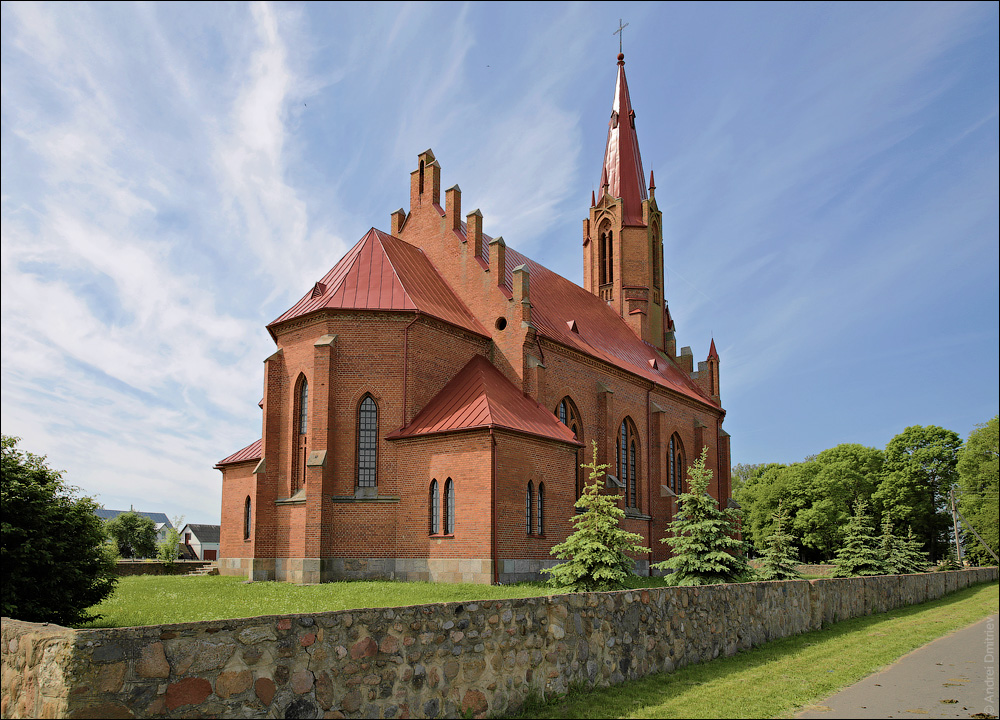
- Church of the Assumption

- Location within Belarus
- Coordinates: 53°14′49″N 24°55′11″E
- Country: Belarus
- Region: Grodno Region
- District: Zelva District

Area
  - Total: 2.33 km^{2} (0.90 sq mi)

Population
  - Total: 495
  - Density: 212/km^{2} (550/sq mi)
- Time zone: UTC+3 (MSK)
- Postal code: 231952
- Area code: +375-1564

Dzyarechyn (Belarusian: Дзярэчын, romanized: Dziarečyn; (Note: Official transliteration.) Russian: Деречин, romanized: Derechin; Polish: Dereczyn) is an agrotown in Zelva District, Grodno Region, Belarus. It serves as the administrative center of Dzyarechyn rural council (selsoviet).

== History ==
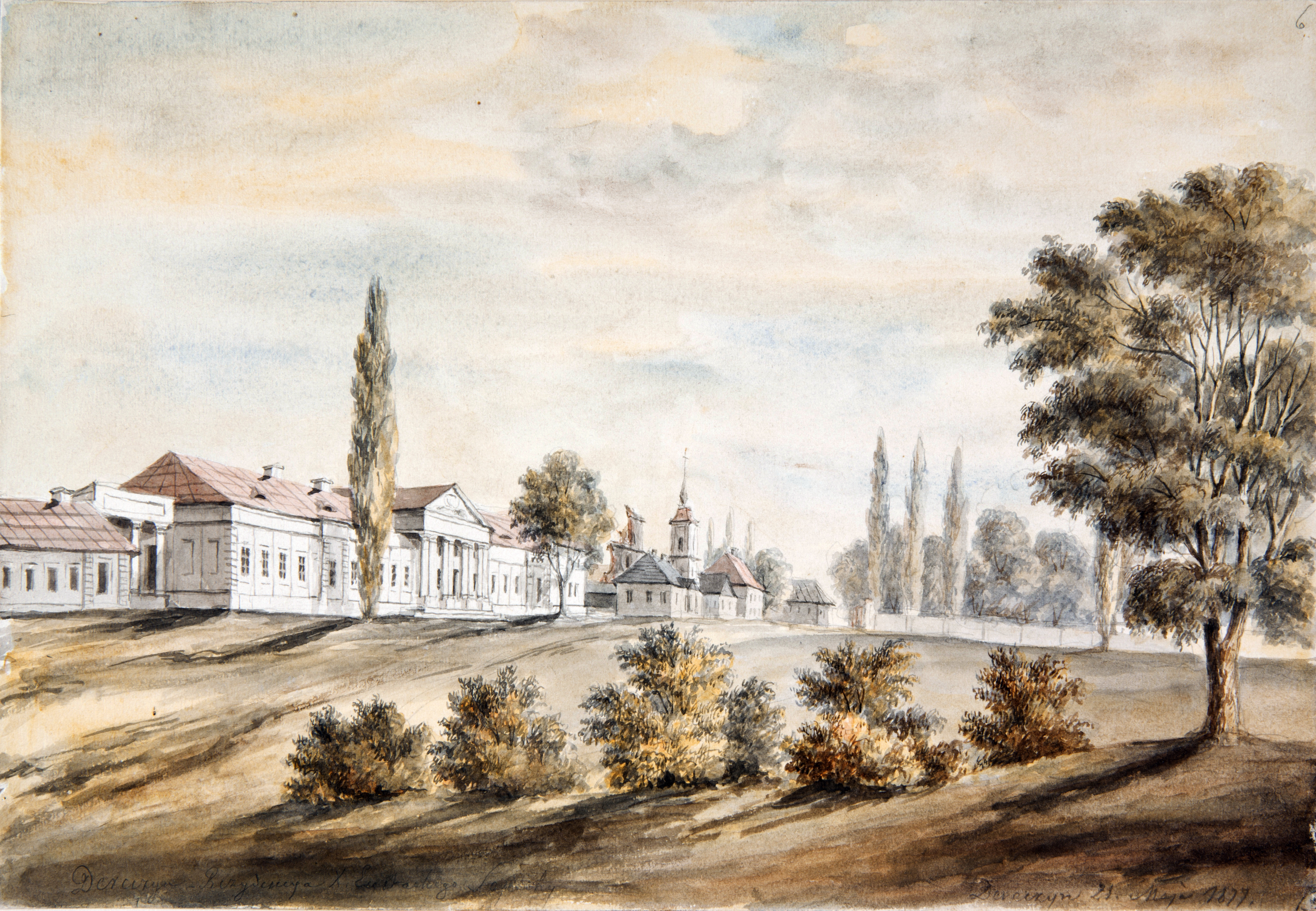
Sapieha Palace in the 19th century

Dereczyn was a private town, owned by the Kopoczewicz, Połubiński and Sapieha families, administratively located in the Słonim County in the Nowogródek Voivodeship of the Polish–Lithuanian Commonwealth. In 1629, Konstanty Połubiński with his wife Zofia founded a Dominican monastery, whereas the Sapiehas built a palace in 1786.

Prior to World War II, it was part of Nowogródek Voivodeship in Poland. In the 1921 census, 60.0% people declared Polish nationality, 33.9% people declared Jewish nationality, and 6.2% declared Belarusian nationality.
