= Wacław Michniewicz =

Polish and Lithuanian architect (1866 – 1947)

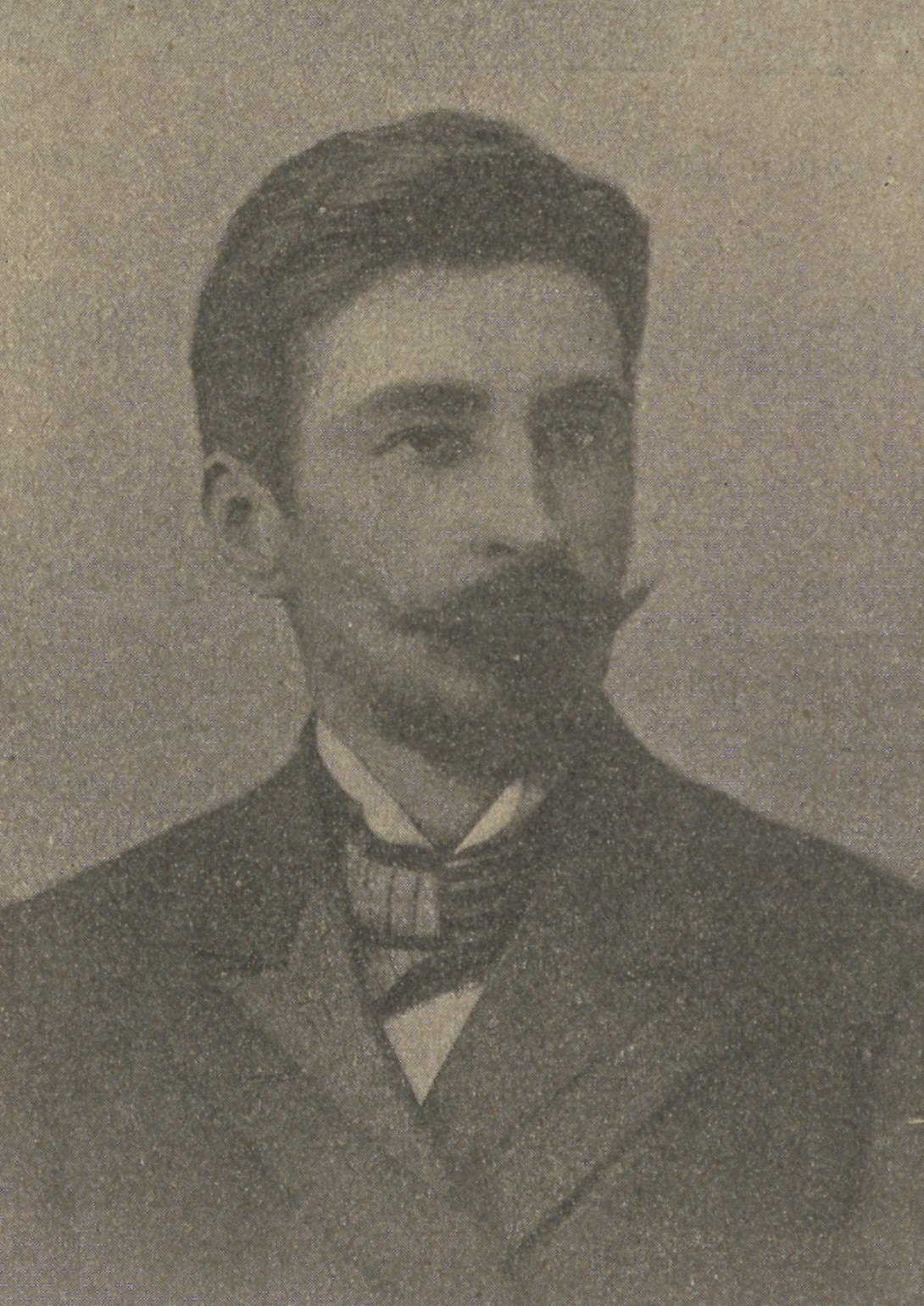
- Born: 15 October 1866; Vaitkuškis
- Died: 14 January 1947
- Occupation: Architect
- Buildings: Church of the Holy Trinity, Hyervyaty; Pohulanka Theatre, Vilnius; Church of the Immaculate Conception of the Blessed Virgin Mary, Vilnius

Wacław Michniewicz (Lithuanian: Vaclovas Michnevičius; 15 October 1866 – 14 January 1947) was a Polish-Lithuanian architect active in Vilnius, Lithuania.

== Early life and education ==
Wacław Michniewicz was born on 15 October 1866 in the village of Vaitkuškis (Pabaiskas parish), around 4 km (2.5 mi) south of Ukmergė. At that time, Lithuania part of the Russian Empire.

He graduated from the Russian Real School in Vilnius in 1888, then studied at the Institute of Civil Engineers in St. Petersburg. He graduated in 1893 and returned to Vilnius.

== Career ==
In Vilnius, Michniewicz was first an assistant to Cyprian Maculewicz, then from 1904 an architect and chief engineer of the city of Vilnius. He was a member of the Vilnius branch of the Imperial Russian Technical Society. When the possibility of establishing Polish societies arose in 1905, he was one of the founding members of the Association of Technicians in Vilnius, established on 26 April 1905.

In 1912, Michniewicz left the city service and, together with Aleksander Parczewski, founded the design and construction bureau "Architekt". At the outbreak of the Great War, he was drafted into the Imperial Russian army to serve in road construction. He survived the war in Russia. After returning to Lithuania, he bought back the family house in Strebeikiai from relatives, where he settled, dividing his time between it and his work in Kaunas.

Until 1925, he worked for the Kaunas City Road and Highway Administration. At that time he wrote a textbook on road repair and construction ("Vieškeliai ir pasraštijie keliai, mai tymas ir laikams"). For political reasons, he was not given the position of architect of the city of Kaunas.

== Projects ==
In Vilnius, he designed at least 30 buildings, and nearly 30 churches built by him have been established in Lithuania and Belarus. Michniewicz is also the author of designs for several private houses, villas, chapels and tombstones.

Among his best-known designs in Vilnius are the Market Halls, built between 1904 and 1906, and the Pohulanka Theatre, designed along with Aleksander Parczewski, which was built between 1912 and 1914 on the initiative of Hipolit Korwin-Milewski and funded by Polish residents of Vilnius. The theatre is now called the Old Theatre, situated in Vilnius Old Town, which is a UNESCO world heritage site. It has had various names since inception:

In Kaunas, his best-known project is the Tatar mosque.

== Later life and death ==
Michniewicz retired in 1936. He escaped occupation to Soviet Russia during World War II, but after the war his daughter Irena with her family and his wife Karolina were deported to Krasnoyarsk. His son emigrated to Poland.

He died on 14 January 1947 in Žeimiai, Lithuania, and was buried in the churchyard of a church he himself had designed there.

== Personal life ==
He married Karolina Feige, a German teacher from Bavaria, and they had two children, Kazimierz and Irena.

== Bibliography ==
- Ilgiewicz, Henryka (2010). "Udział ziemian w wileńskich towarzystwach rolniczych i technicznych na początku XX w." [Participation of landowners in Vilnius agricultural and technical societies in the early 20th century.] (PDF). Studia z Historii Społeczno-Gospodarczej. 7.
