= Church of the Immaculate Conception of the Blessed Virgin Mary, Vilnius =

Roman Catholic church in Vilnius, Lithuania built in 1925

Church of the Immaculate Conception of the Blessed Virgin Mary Švč. Mergelės Marijos Nekaltojo Prasidėjimo bažnyčia
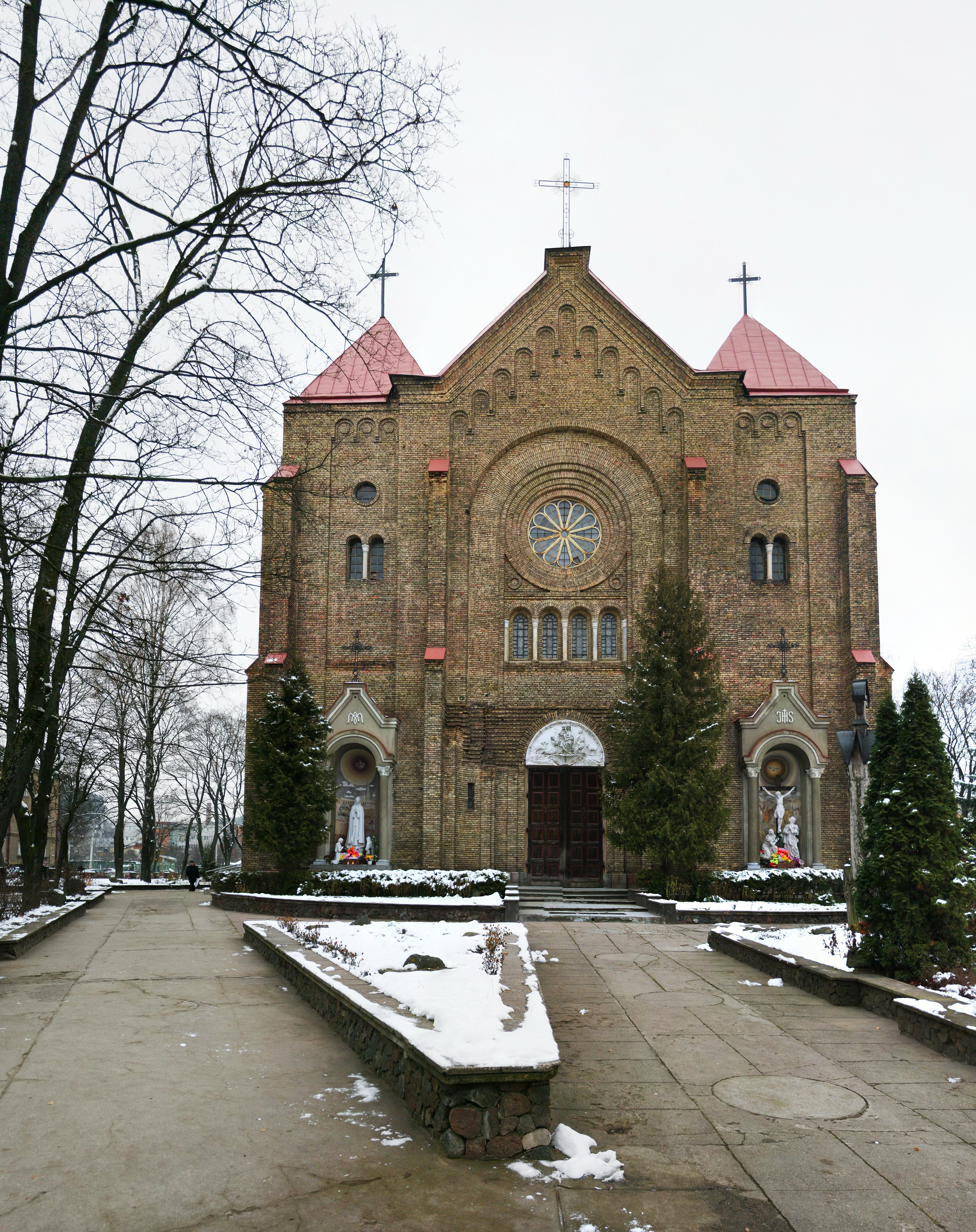
- Façade of the church in 2007

Religion
- Affiliation: Roman Catholic
- Diocese: Žvėrynas
- Leadership: Roman Catholic Archdiocese of Vilnius
- Year consecrated: 1925

Location
- Location: Vilnius, Lithuania
- Interactive map of Church of the Immaculate Conception of the Blessed Virgin Mary; Švč. Mergelės Marijos Nekaltojo Prasidėjimo bažnyčia
- Coordinates: 54°41′54″N 25°15′10″E

Architecture
- Architect: Wacław Michniewicz
- Type: Church
- Style: Historicism, Neo-romanticism
- Completed: 1925
- Materials: Brick masonry

Website
- Zverynoparapija.lt

Church of the Immaculate Conception of the Blessed Virgin Mary (Lithuanian: Švč. Mergelės Marijos Nekaltojo Prasidėjimo bažnyčia) is a Roman Catholic church in Žvėrynas, one of the neighborhoods of Vilnius, which was for the most part completed in 1925. The initial project of the church was only partly implemented as due to the Great Depression and World War II the towers of the church were not built.

== Gallery ==
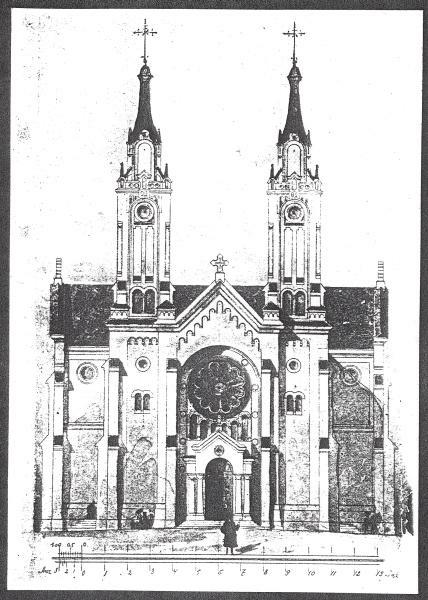
Initial project of the church with towers, 1907

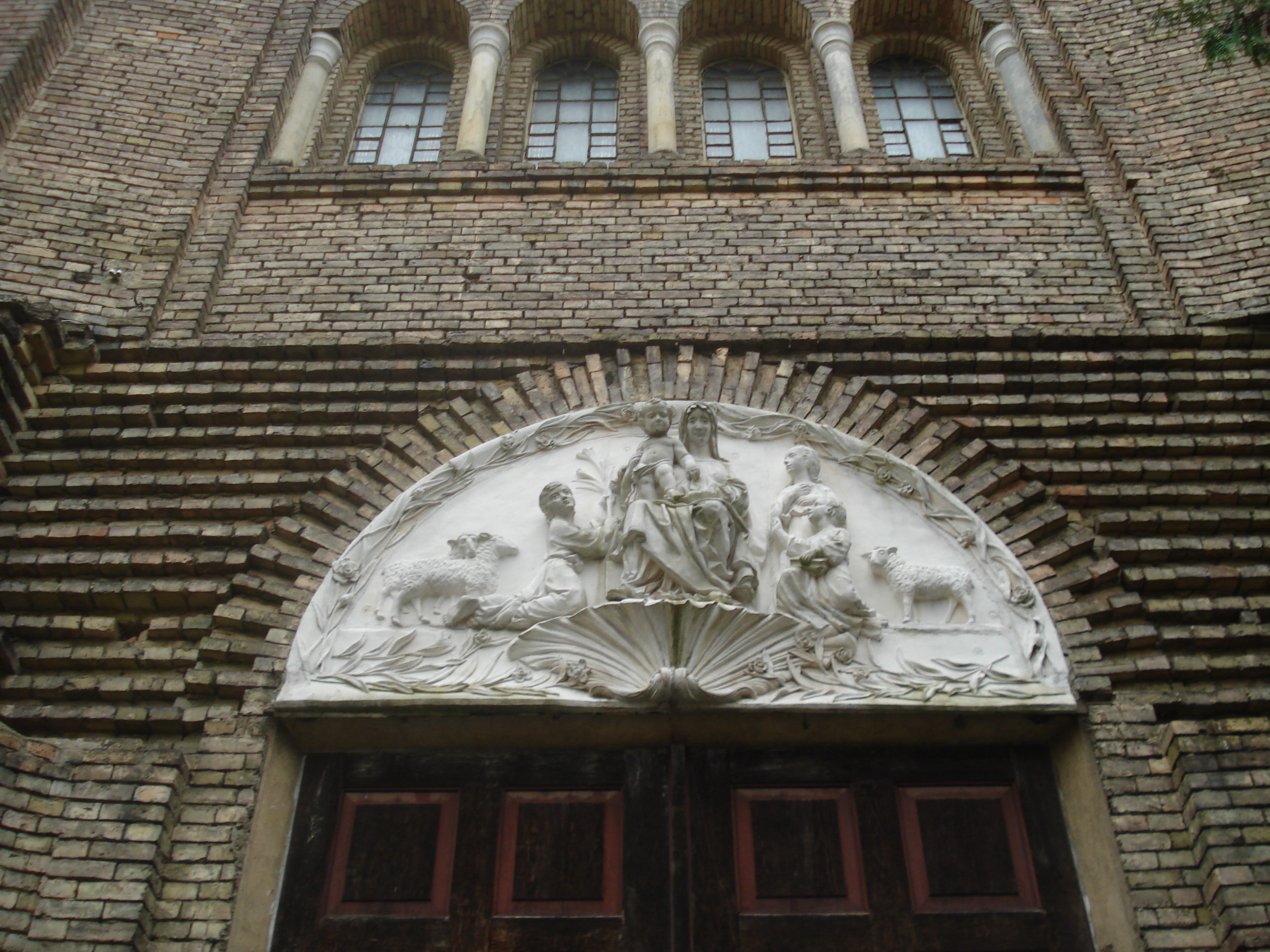
Pediment above the entrance to the church

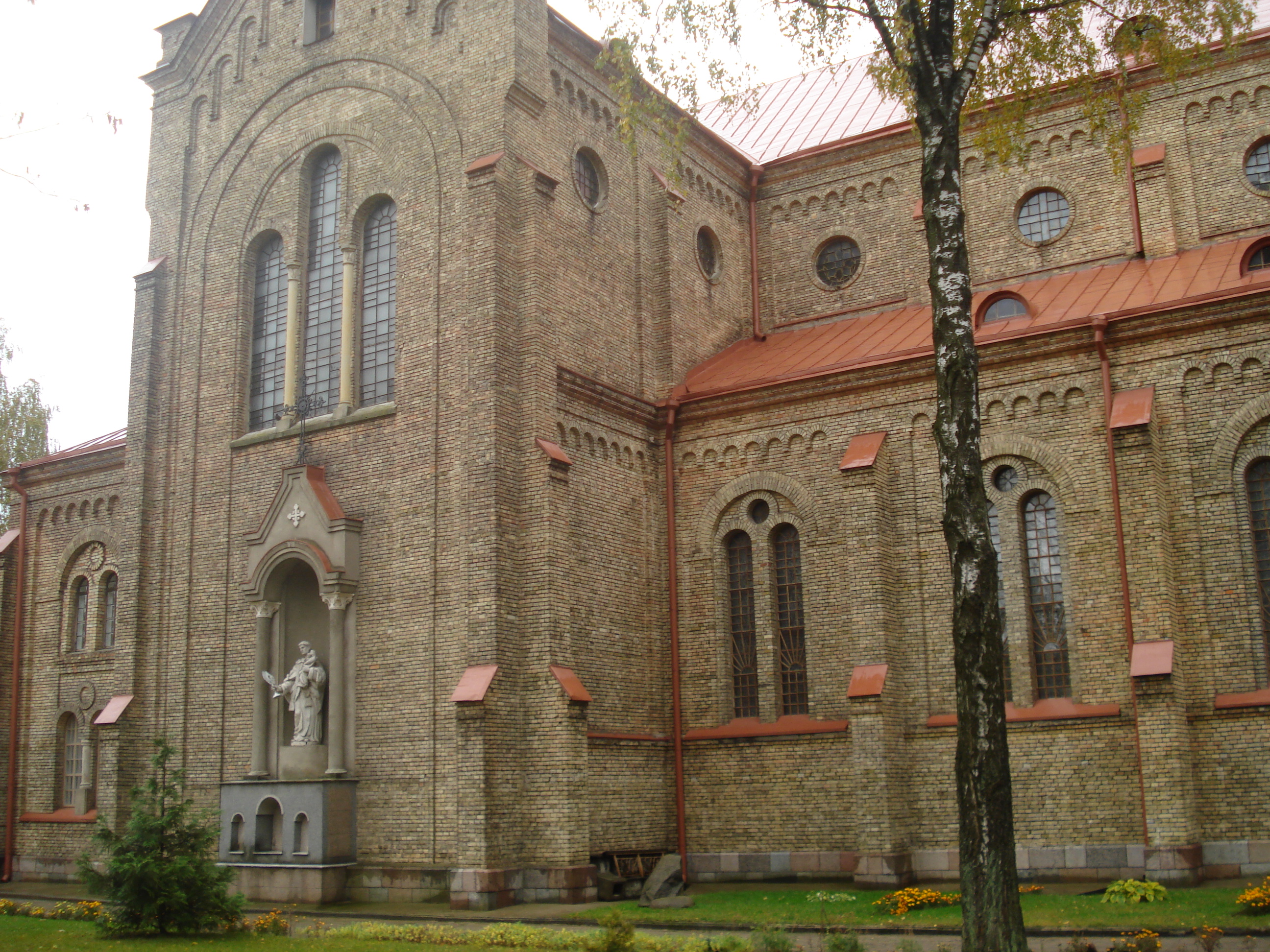
Side-view of the church

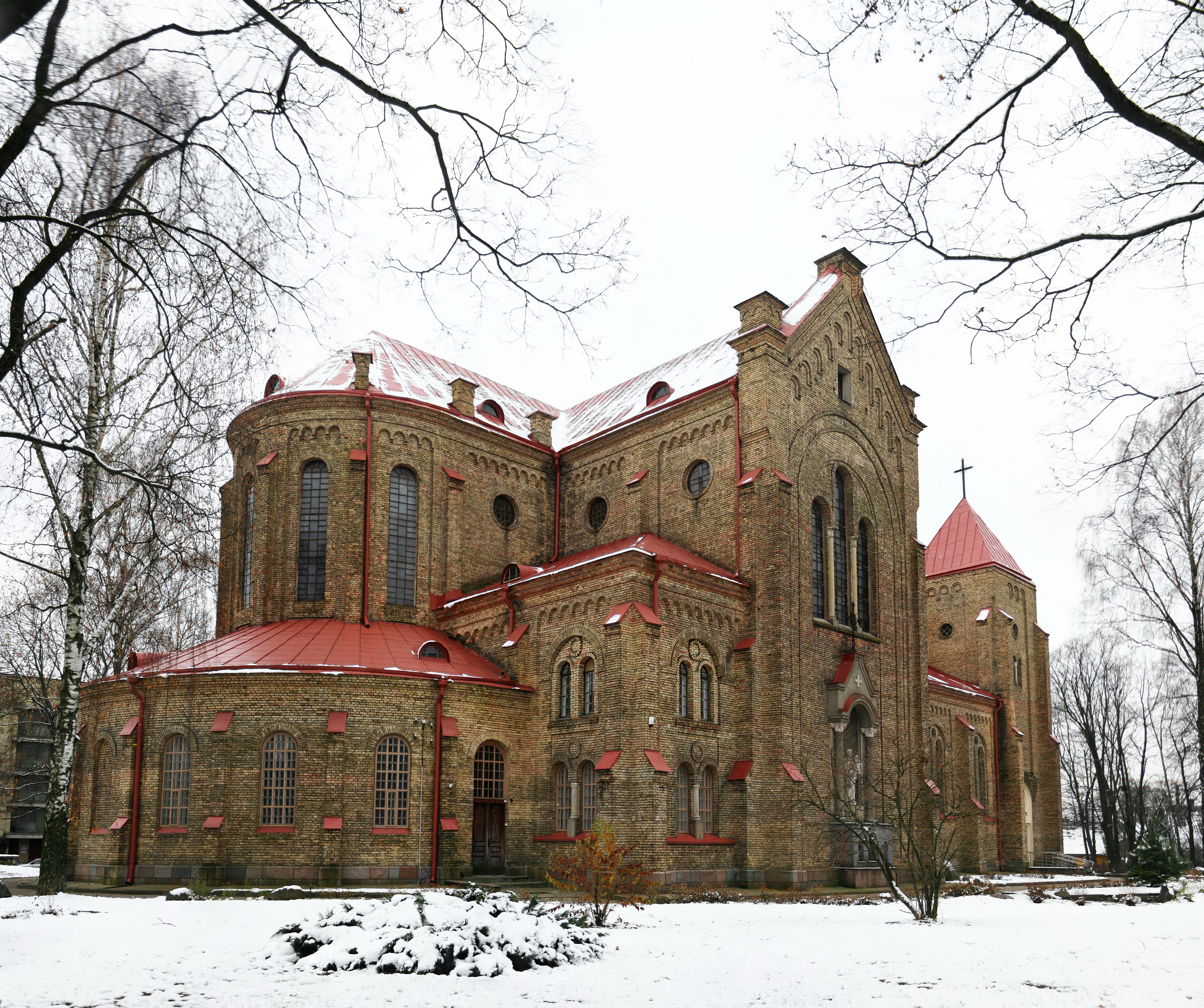
Rear-view of the church
