= Church of the Holy Trinity, Hyervyaty =

Church of the Holy Trinity
- Касцёл Святой Тройцы
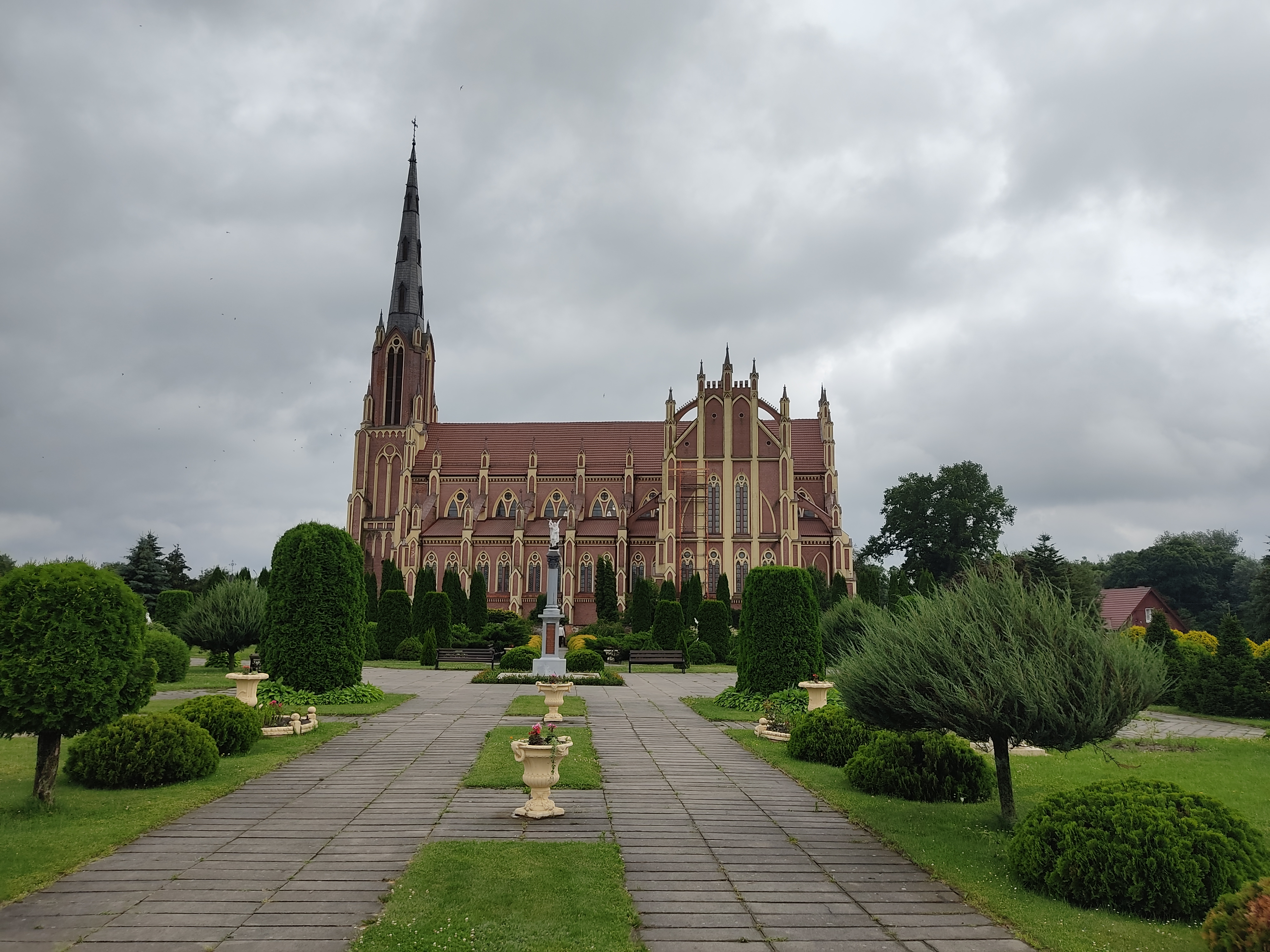

- Location within Belarus
- 54°41′13″N 26°08′38″E
- Location: Hyervyaty, Astravyets District, Grodno Region
- Country: Belarus
- Denomination: Roman Catholic
- Website: Official website

History
- Status: Parish church

Architecture
- Functional status: Active
- Architect(s): Alaksiej Połazaŭ, Wacław Michniewicz
- Style: Neogothic
- Completed: 1899—1903

Specifications
- Height: 61 m
- Materials: Brick

The Church of the Holy Trinity (Belarusian: Касцёл Найсвяцейшай Тройцы; Polish: Kościół Trójcy Przenajświetszej, Lithuanian: Gervėčių Švenčiausiosios Trejybės bažnyčia) is a Roman Catholic church in Hyervyaty, Grodno Region, Belarus. It is an example of the Belarusian Neogothic architecture and was built in 1899–1903. The church is a site of cultural heritage of Belarus.

== History ==
The first parish in Hyervyaty was established in 1526 by the archbishop John. Gradually it fell into decline and in 1621 Eustachy Wołłowicz constructed the new wooden church. It was destroyed by fire in 1736. Almost a hundred years later the philanthropist reconstructed the church. In 1860, Kazimir Domeyko founded the stone bell tower and reconstructed the church in 1862. The last restoration was executed in 1894-1895, but three years later the church was demolished.

The modern building was constructed in place of the old one in 1899—1903. Usually the authorship is attributed to architects Wacław Michniewicz and Alaksiej Połazaŭ (1820-1903). However, some sources claim that the design was created by Ignatiy Olshansky, brother of a local priest. According to the year books, every day 70 men worked at the construction site. Specially for the church a brick factory was built near the village. Lime was mined near the Losha, to make limestone more solid thousands of eggs were bought from local farmers. Roof tiles were imported from Germany. Mostly the funds for construction were donated by Vazlav Domeyko and his mother Anjela, nee Naruszewicz. Her son-in-law brought from Germany the ceramic tiles to the church.

The new church was consecrated on September 8, 1904.

== Architecture ==
The Church of the Holy Trinity is a typical example of the Neogothic style. Its height is 61 meter, and it's one of the tallest churches in Belarus. The temple has three naves and a small transept, the naves are separated from each other by two rows of five columns each. There is no apse behind the presbytery. A characteristic element of the architecture of the temple are multi-stage buttresses, turning into flying buttresses. The walls of the temple are cut through with narrow lancet window openings in niches.

In front of the temple there are several wooden crosses with rich carvings, which is typical for Lithuanian temples. Around the temple there is a landscape park with rare plants and figures of the apostles. The church is acknowledged as one of the most beautiful in Belarus, nicknamed ‘Little Switzerland’ and ‘Belarusian Notre-Dame. The church is the main tourist attraction in Hyervyaty.

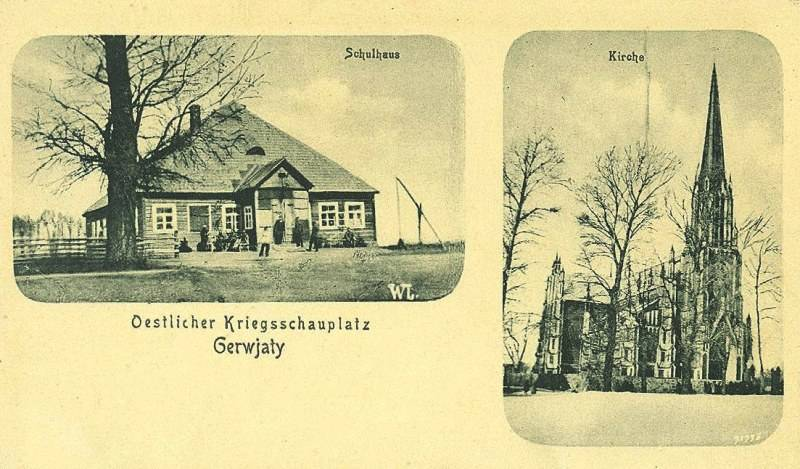
Postcard, 1916

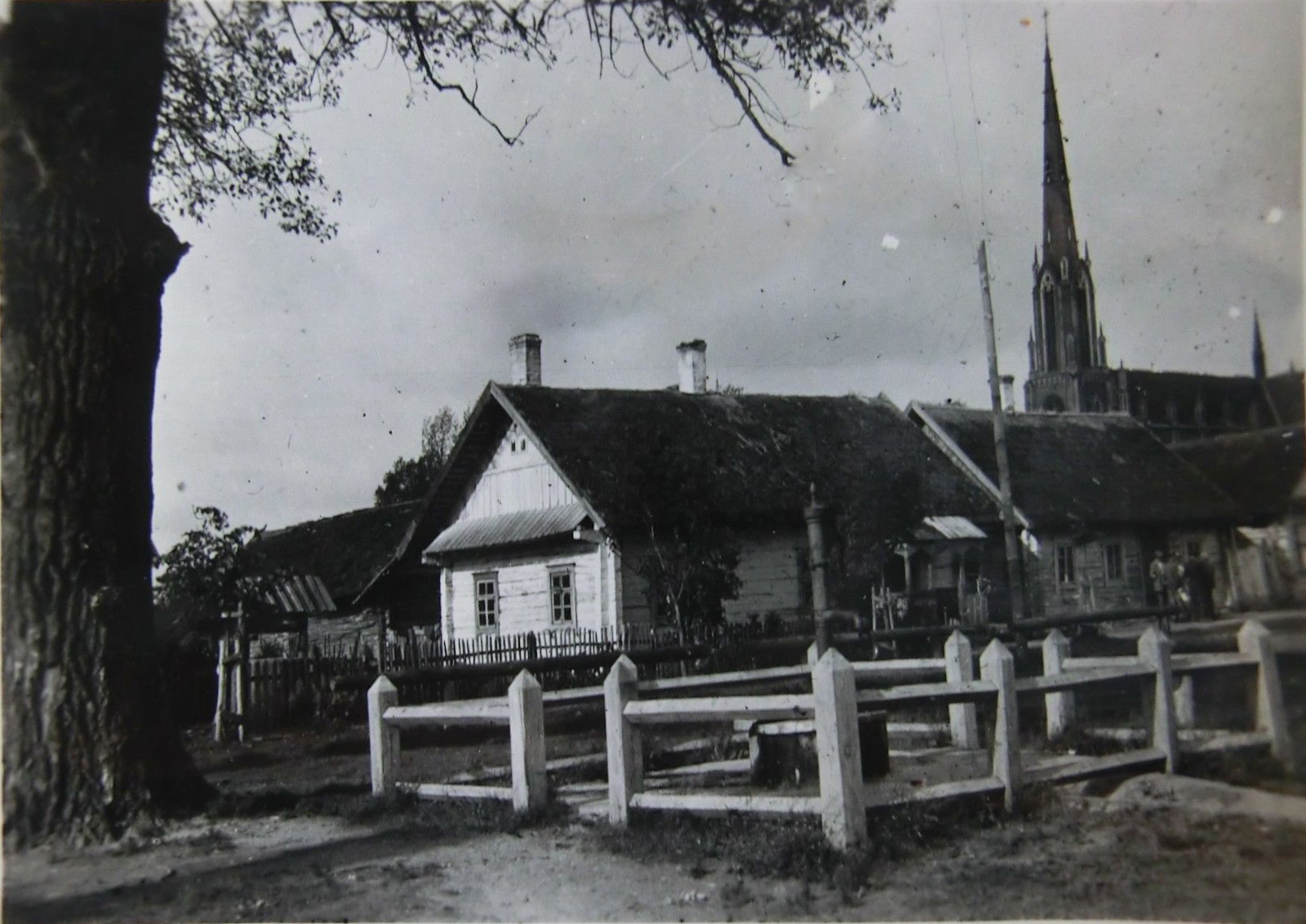
1941-1944

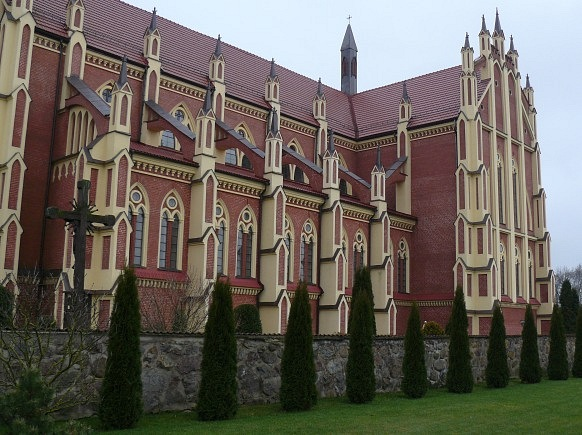
Details

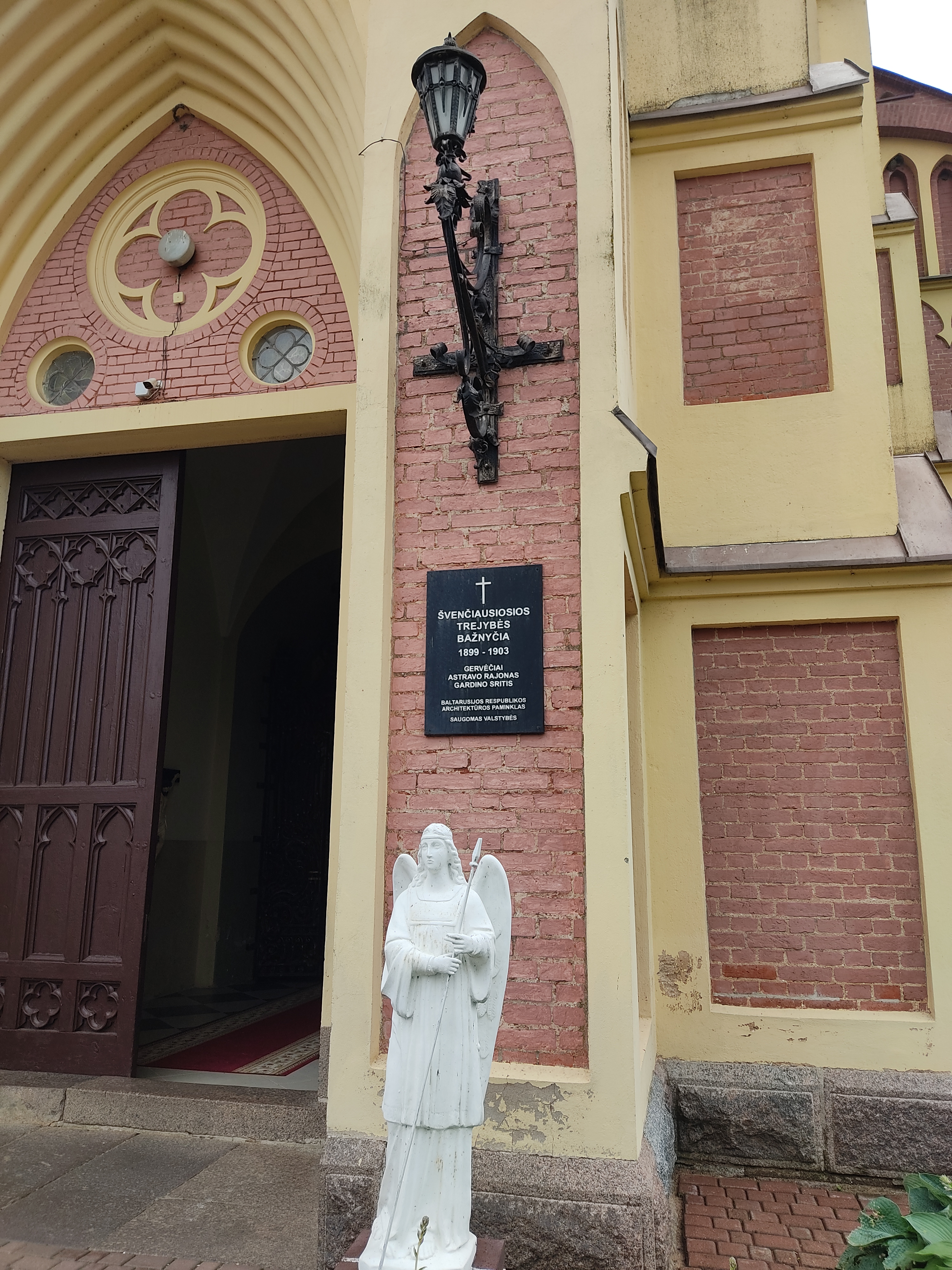
Church note fragment in Lithuanian

== Plan of the church ==
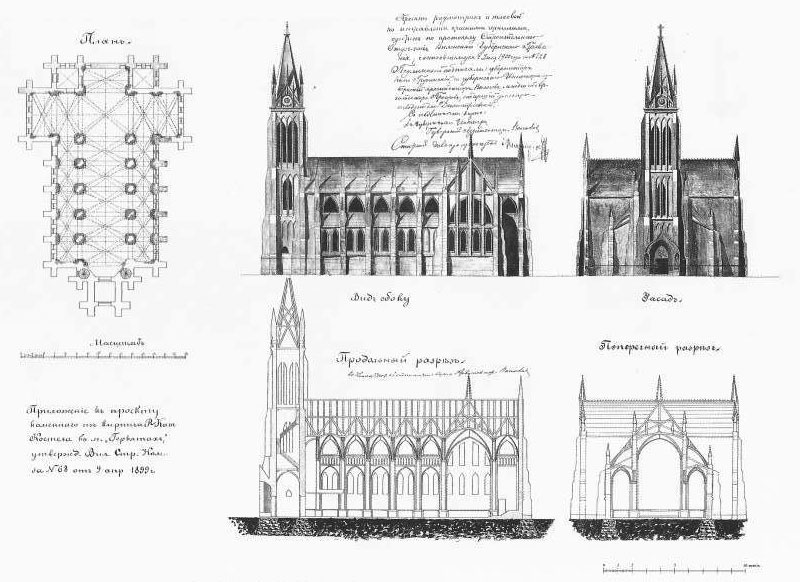
Plan of the church by its architect A. Połazaŭ, 1900
