= Church of Saint Anthony of Padua, Kamyenka =

Coordinates: 53°33′9″N 24°30′28″E

Church of Saint Anthony of Padua in Kamienka
- Касцёл Святога Антонія Падуанскага
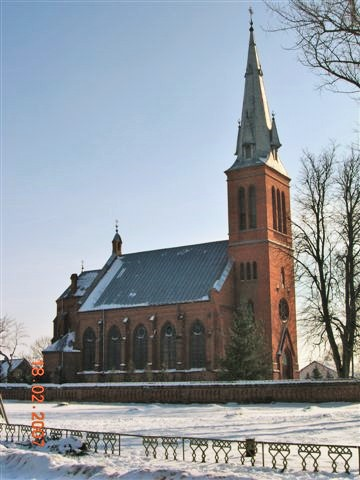
- Church of Saint Anthony of Padua in Kamienka
- Location: Kamienka
- Country: Belarus
- Denomination: Roman Catholic church

Architecture
- Style: Gothic Revival architecture
- Completed: 1908

Administration
- Diocese: Roman Catholic Diocese of Grodno

Church of Saint Anthony of Padua is a Catholic church in Kamienka, Belarus, built in 1908. The church is a landmark of the Grodno Region; it is listed as an object of Belarusian cultural heritage.

== Sources ==
- Gabrus, T. V. (1993). Архітэктура Беларусі. Энцыклапедычны даведнік [Encyclopedia Architecture of Belarus]. Minsk: «Беларуская Энцыклапедыя імя Петруся Броўкі». p. 233. ISBN 5-85700-078-5.
