= Grodno region =

Region of Belarus

Coordinates: 53°45′N 25°20′E

Grodno Region Гродзенская вобласць (Belarusian) Гродненская область (Russian)
- Region
- Grodno Oblast
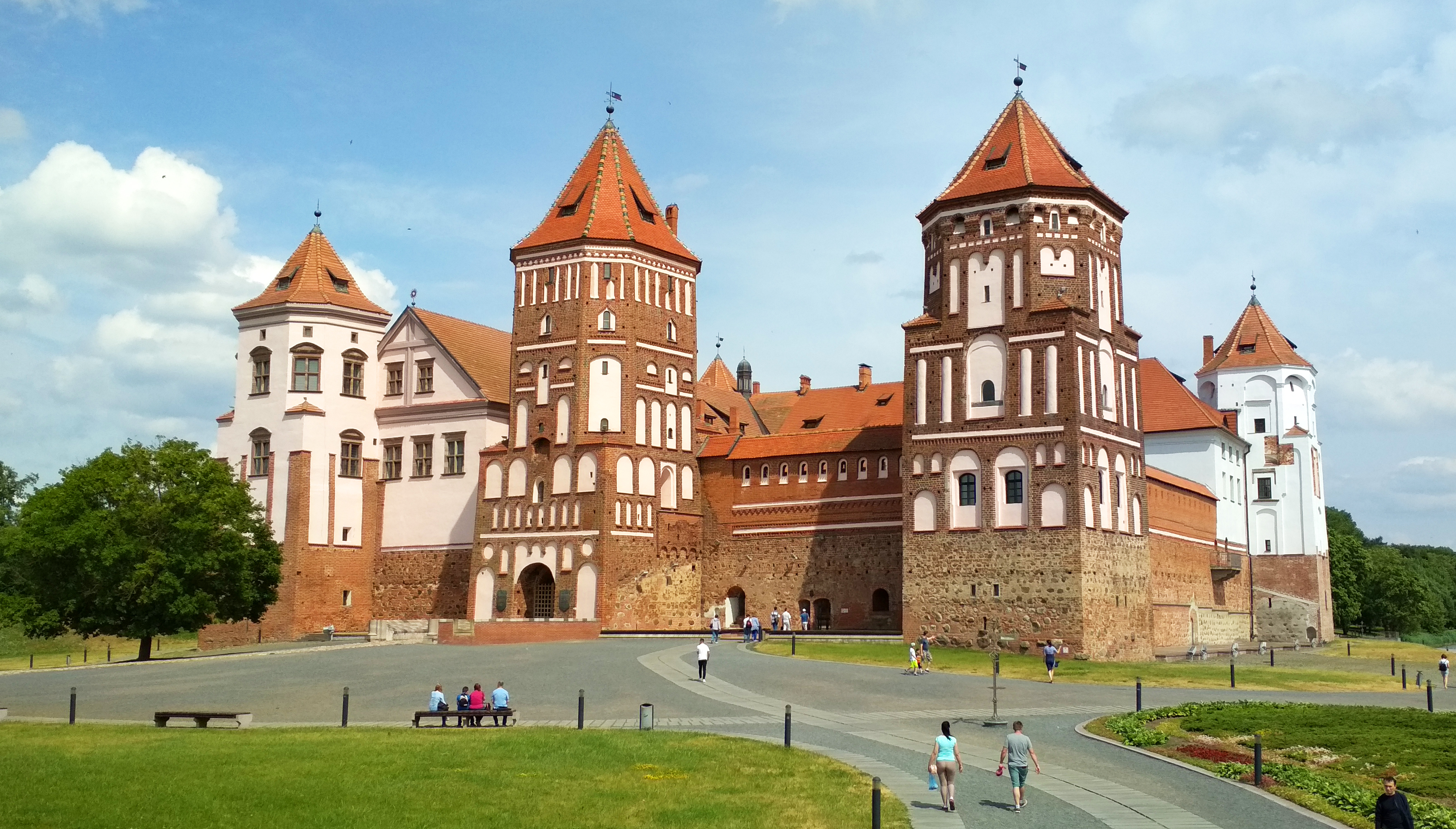
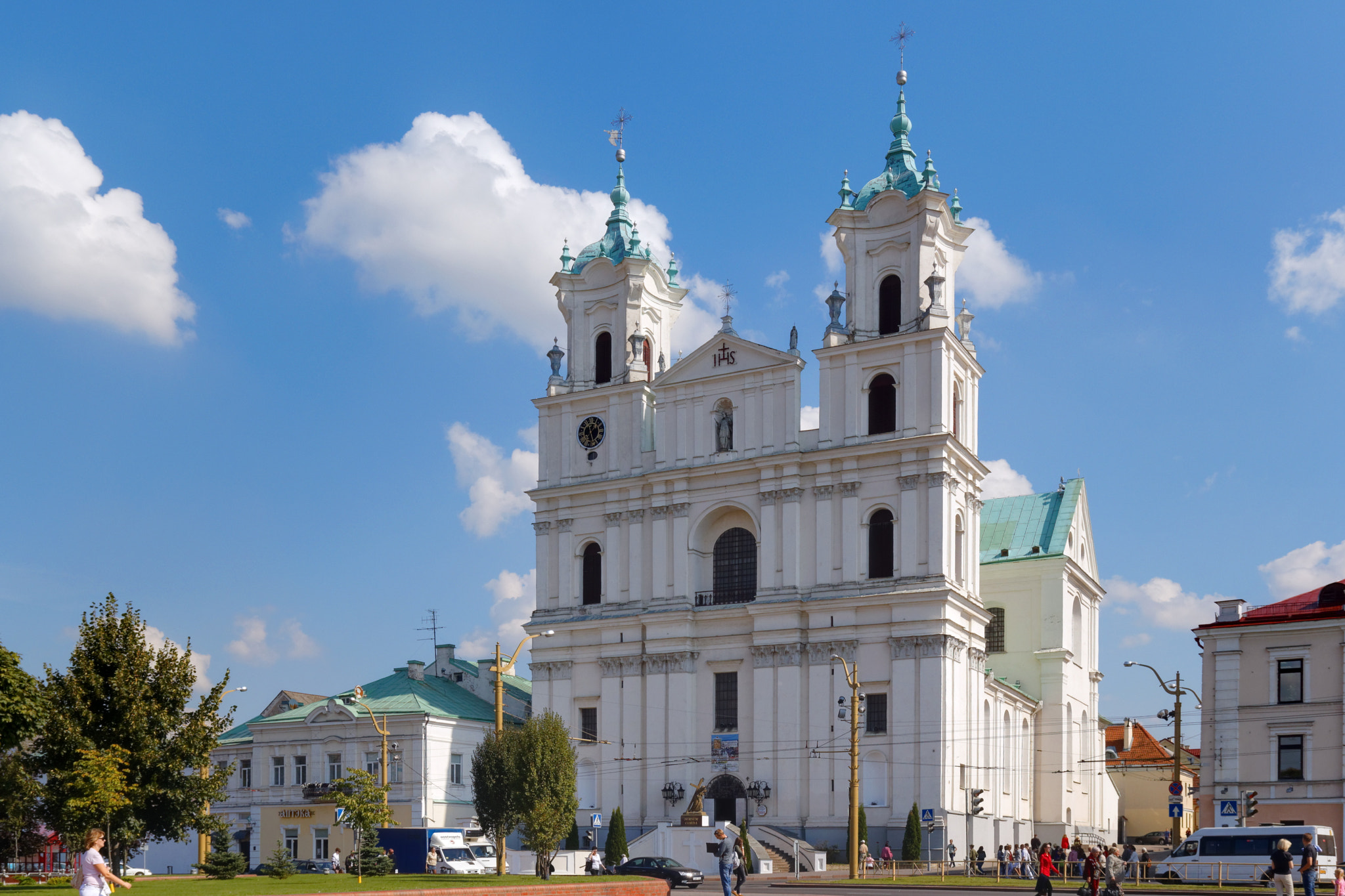
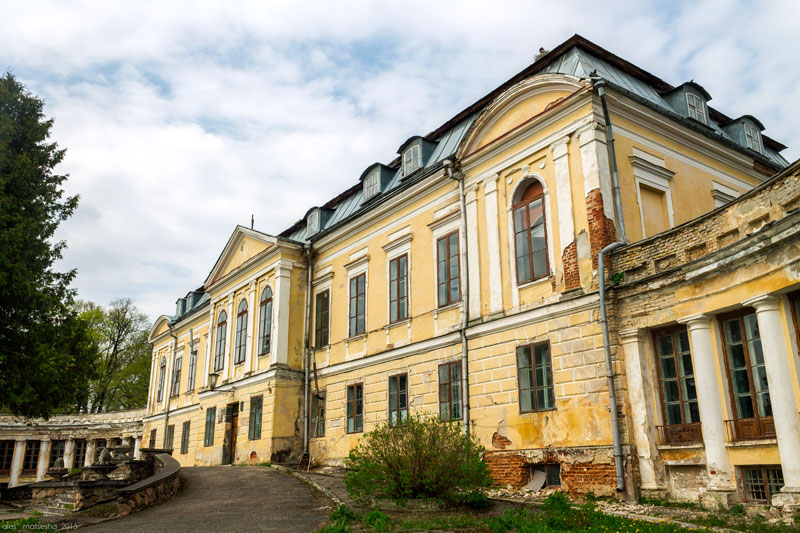
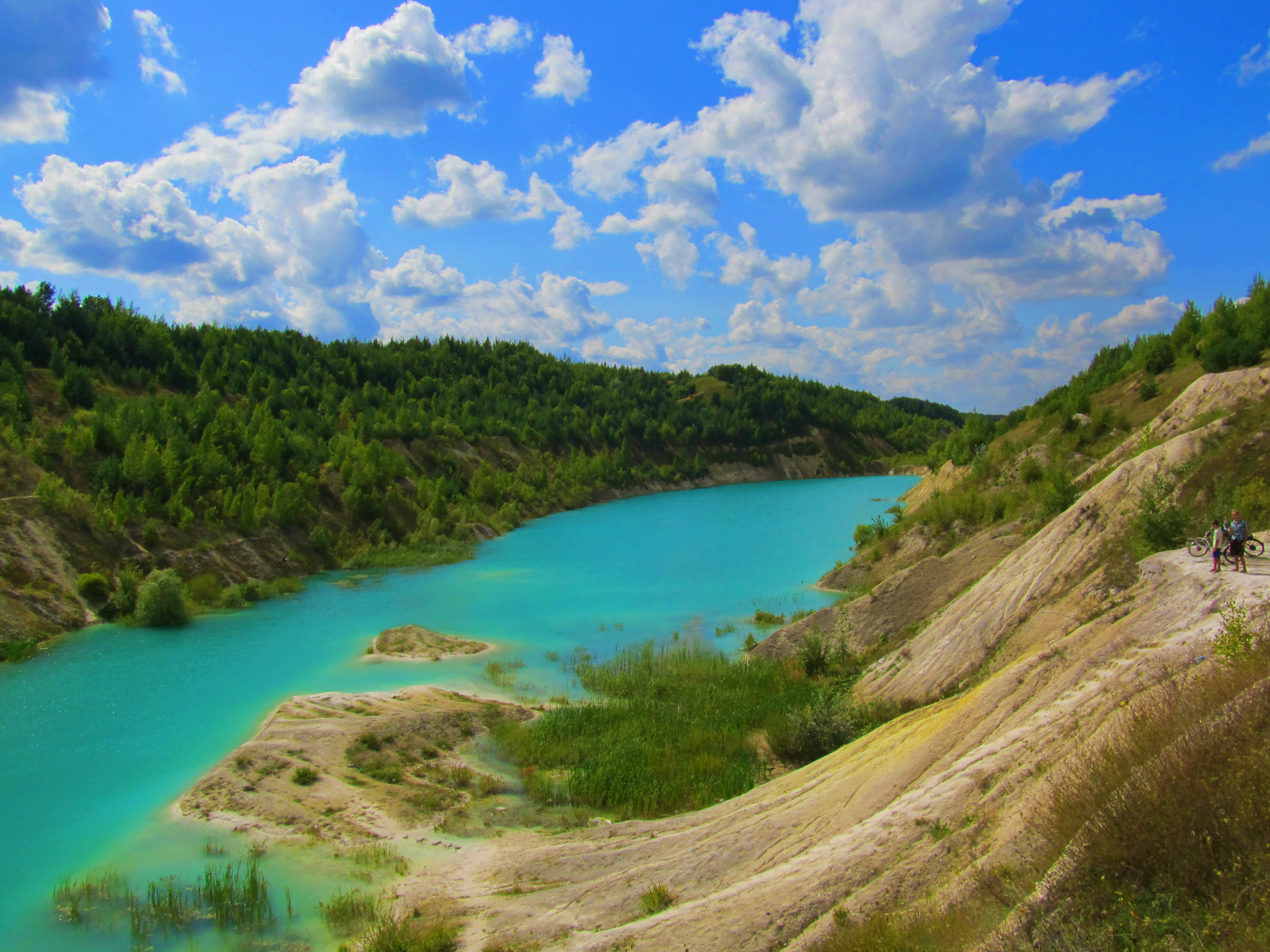
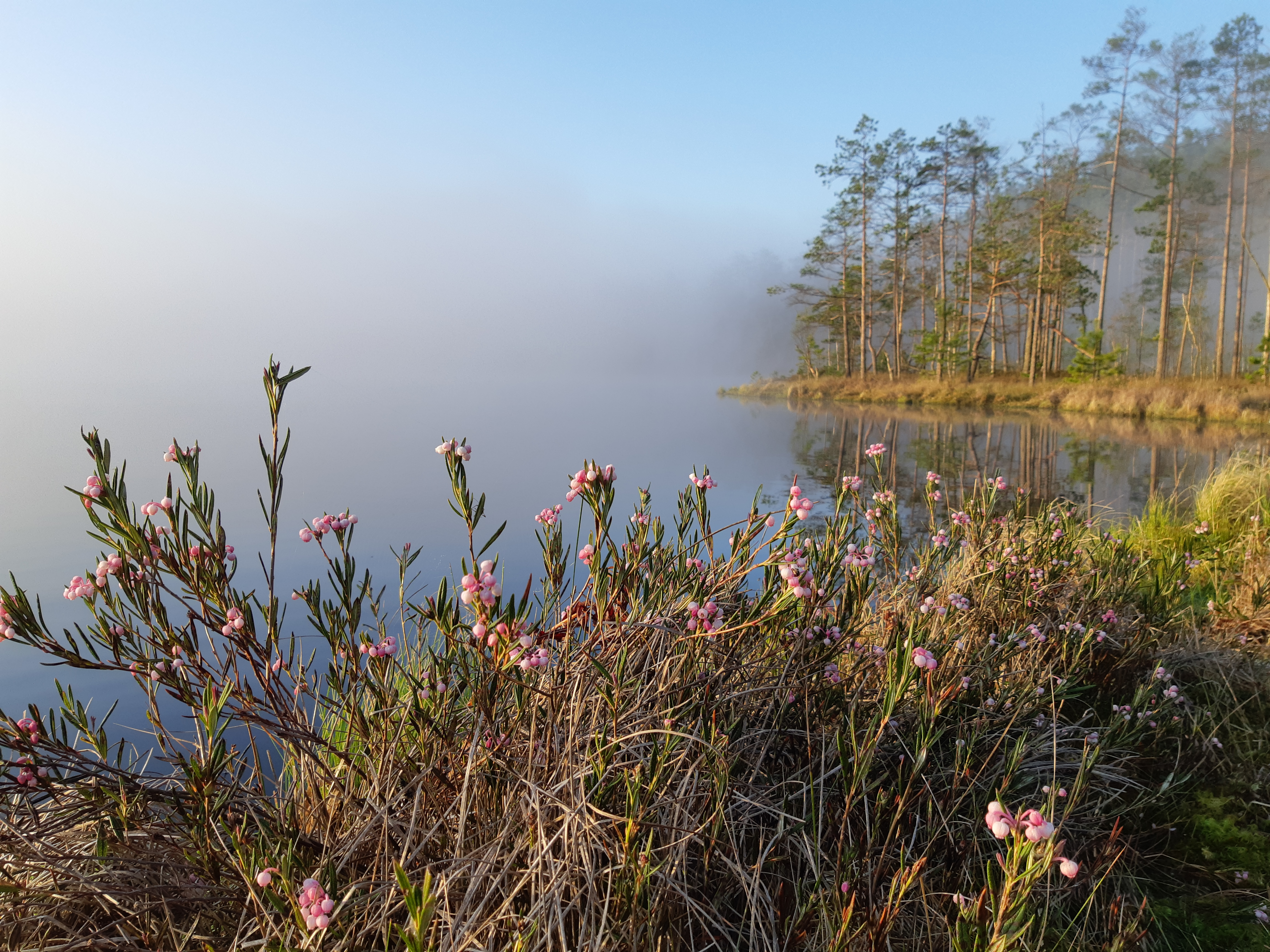
- From the top to bottom-right: Mir Castle Complex, St. Francis Xavier Cathedral, Sviack Palace, Vawkavysk District, Devil's Lake

- Flag Coat of arms

- Interactive map of Grodno Region
- Country: Belarus
- Administrative center: Grodno
- Largest cities: Grodno - 373,547; Lida - 101,616; Slonim - 49,441
- Districts: 17; Cities: 12; Urban localities: 21
- City districts: 2

Government
  - Chairman: Yury Karayeu

Area
  - Total: 25,118.07 km^{2} (9,698.14 sq mi)
- Highest elevation: 323 m (1,060 ft)
- Lowest elevation: 80 m (260 ft)

Population (2024)
  - Total: 992,556
  - Density: 39.5156/km^{2} (102.345/sq mi)

GDP (nominal,2024)
  - Total: Br 27.072 billion (US$8.292 billion)
  - Per capita: Br 27,381 (US$8,387)
- ISO 3166 code: BY-HR
- HDI (2022): 0.798 high · 3rd
- Website: www.region.grodno.by

Grodno Region, also known as Grodno Oblast (Note: Russian: Гродненская область, romanized: Grodnenskaya oblast'; Polish: Obwód Grodzieński.) or Hrodna Voblasts, (Note: Belarusian: Гродзенская вобласць, romanized: Hrodzienskaja voblasć.) is a region of Belarus. Its administrative centre and its namesake, Grodno, is the largest city in the whole region. As of 2024, it has a population of 992,556.

Located in western Belarus, it lies on the Neman River. The region borders the Minsk region to the east, the Brest region to the south, Poland (Podlaskie Voivodeship) to the west and the Vitebsk region and Lithuania (Alytus and Vilnius counties) to the north.

== History ==
This region comprised the westernmost "borderlands" of the early East Slavs (possibly the tribal union Dregoviches) on the lands of the Balts in the 6th–9th centuries CE. The city of Grodno is first mentioned in the Primary Chronicle under the year 1127 as Goroden. It was located at the crossing of numerous trading routes, possibly originating as far as the late 10th century. It also became the capital of a poorly attested but separate principality. In the 12th–14th centuries, it formed part of the area sometimes known as Black Ruthenia, which was fully incorporated into the Grand Duchy of Lithuania in the 13th century. The Baltic Yotvingians who inhabited the Grodno region became increasingly Lithuanized, especially during the formation of the State of Lithuania in the 13th century. As a result, Grodno and its surroundings were included in Ethnographic Lithuania for long thereafter. (e.g. in the 19th century the Lithuanian-inhabited areas were still nearby the present-day suburbs of Grodno city).

In 1413, the area became administratively divided between the newly established Trakai Voivodeship and the Vilnius Voivodeship. In 1507, the southern part of the current oblast became part of the newly formed Nowogródek Voivodeship. Historical cities of notable importance were Grodno (seat of Grodno County and one of the main royal residences of the Polish-Lithuanian Commonwealth), Nowogródek (provincial capital since 1507), county seats of Vawkavysk, Slonim, Lida, and Mir, (a private town of the Radziwiłł family). These cities were granted the Magdeburg Law charters in 1441, 1511, 1503, 1532, 1590, and 1579 respectively.

The strong economic development of the area continued during the reign of King Casimir's son — Duke Alexander Jagiellon of Lithuania (r. 1492–1506) — who founded the first solid bridge over the Neman River, as well as the monasteries of the Order of Saint Augustine and of the Polish Order of Friars Minor. Later, Bona Sforza, Queen-Consort of Poland and Grand Duchess-Consort of Lithuania (r. 1518–1548), established her royal residence in Grodno. According to medieval surveys, Grodno had 35 streets and 700 houses in 1558.

The golden age of Grodno came with the reign of Stephen Báthory, King of Poland (r. 1576–1586). During his reign, Grodno became a royal headquarters and began to host sessions of the Polish–Lithuanian Commonwealth Senate and Parliament (Sejm). In 1580, on the king's order, the castle of Grodno was rebuilt in Renaissance architectural style by Scoto di Parma.

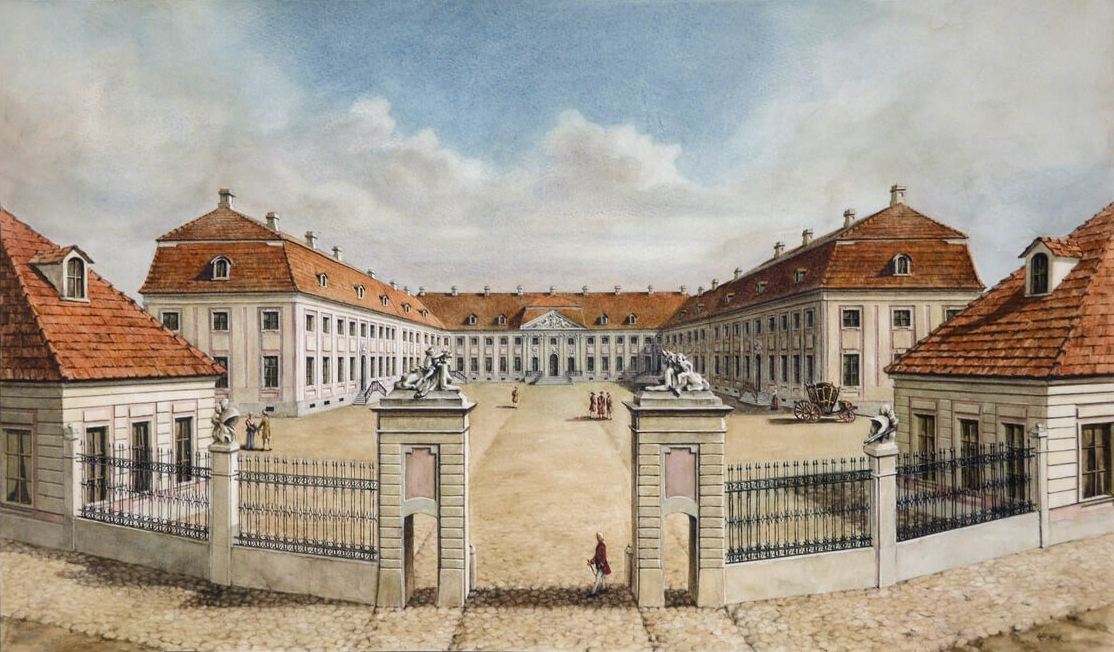
18th-century view of the New Castle in Grodno

At the beginning of the 17th century, Grodno, one of the most developed and important cities in the Polish–Lithuanian Commonwealth, was traditionally recognized as the third capital of the commonwealth. Deterioration of the province's status began with the Livonian War between 1558 and 1583, which pitted the Polish–Lithuanian Commonwealth and the Swedish Empire in a lengthy and exhausting military conflict against the Tsardom of Russia. Between 1765 and 1780, the province regained some of its previous status when Antoni Tyzenhaus, the Treasurer of the Grand Duchy of Lithuania and administrator of Polish royal estates, governed the capital and the province. Tyzenhaus fostered around 50 new commercial endeavors in the region with the building of manufactures, mills and workshops.

As part of the Polish-Lithuanian Commonwealth, and due to subsequent Partitions of Poland, the whole of the Grodno region was annexed by the Russian Empire by the end of 1795. The city of Grodno then became a seat for the Grodno Governorate.

During World War I, the governorate was occupied by the German Empire. German troops entered Grodno city on 3 September 1915, plundering the Library of Dominicans Order. During the German occupation, Polish citizens were persecuted and had restricted civil rights. Towards the end of the war, the Belarusian People's Republic (BNR) declared its independence from Soviet Russia in March 1918 in Minsk. Grodno was the site of the last stand of the BNR's Council (Rada). Soon, the council was forced to flee as Soviet troops invaded the region and the city in 1919 in a prelude to the Polish–Soviet War.

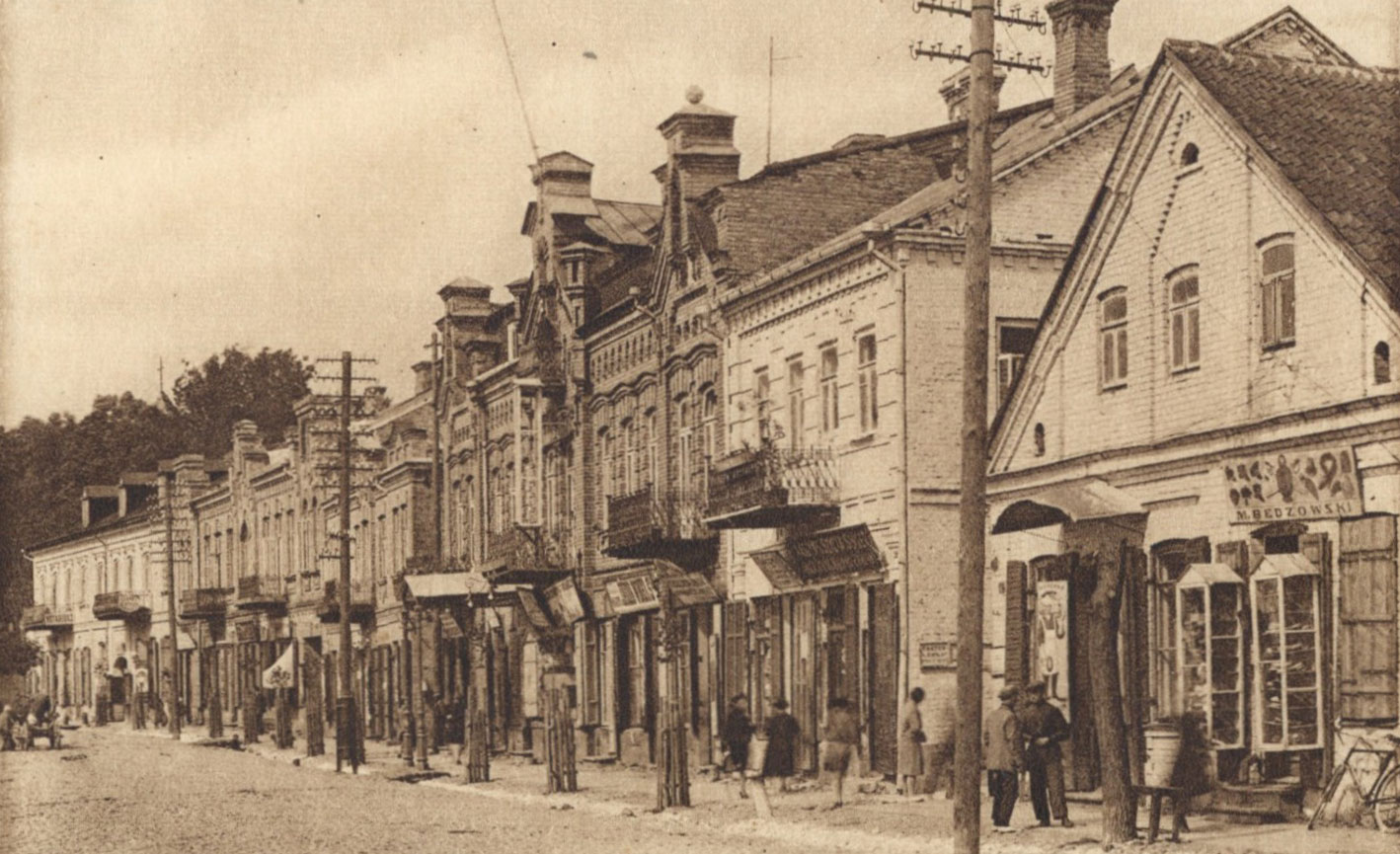
Lida in the 1930s

Under the terms of the Peace Treaty of Riga, the region and the city returned to the Second Polish Republic which claimed rights to this territory as a successor to the Polish–Lithuanian Commonwealth and as a victorious side of the Polish–Soviet War. By 1939, Grodno city had 60,000 inhabitants, with Poles and Jews accounting for 60% and 37% of the population, respectively. During Polish rule, Grodno was the center of Grodno County in Białystok Voivodeship, but some parts of present Grodno region were in the voivodeships of Nowogródek and Wilno.

After World War II started, on 17 September 1939 (Soviet Invasion of Poland), the Grodno area was invaded by the Soviet Union, and forcibly incorporated into the Byelorussian Soviet Socialist Republic. Over 300 captured Polish defenders of Grodno, including Polish Army officers and youth, were summarily executed by Soviet forces. Grodno was located in the newly established Belastok region. Thousands were imprisoned or deported to Siberia and Kazakhstan. In the early summer of 1941, the region fell under German occupation as part of Operation Barbarossa. During the Soviet retreat, more executions of Polish prisoners of war occurred in Grodno.

In November 1941, the occupation forces established the Grodno Ghetto for Jewish citizens of Grodno and the rest of the region. In 1942, after a year of severe persecution and planned starvation of ghetto inhabitants, 10,000 Jews from Grodno were deported to the German concentration camp of Auschwitz-Birkenau to be killed. The following year, in 1943, 17,000 of the surviving ghetto inhabitants were also deported to Auschwitz-Birkenau, as well as to the Treblinka extermination camp and the Białystok Ghetto.

As of 13 March 1943, German troops reported the completion of the extermination and declared Grodno city judenfrei (free of Jews). However, around 50 Jews had survived, some hidden by non-Jewish families. Polish and Soviet underground forces acted in the region. Villages like Dziarečyn, which originally had large Jewish populations, were greatly reduced.

As a result of Joseph Stalin's policy of expansion to the west, it was decided (during the Yalta Conference) that the Polish eastern border would be set roughly along the Curzon Line. Based on this decision, the left-bank part of Grodno town would be kept within the borders of Poland. It is not clear how the original Curzon Line near Grodno was moved by around 20 km to the west. When the so-called "mistake" (today regarded rather as sabotage within British ministry structures) became obvious to negotiators, Stalin refused to correct the mistaken line. Despite multiple and desperate appeals from Polish citizens of Grodno, the whole Grodno region, including the Sapotskin Triangle (still ethnically Polish today), was incorporated to the Soviet Belarus and many Poles emigrated or were expelled.

In 1944, the Belastok Region was dissolved and the Grodno region was established.

Since 1991, the Grodno region constitutes one of the six regions of independent Belarus.

== Heritage and tourism ==
The main tourist attractions in the region are numerous old architectural constructions such as castles in Mir, Lida, and Novogrudok. A part of the Białowieża Forest is situated here, but the tourist excursions start from the Brest region part of the National Park. Zhyrovichy Monastery is also a destination for religious travellers.

The Mir Castle Complex and Belovezhskaya Pushcha National Park are UNESCO World Heritage Sites. There are also sites from the Belarusian cultural heritage list, such as the Church of Saint Anthony of Padua in Kamienka; St. Francis Xavier Cathedral in Grodno; St Andrew's Church in Slonim; and the Church of the Holy Trinity in Hyervyaty. Two castles dating from the 14th to 18th centuries are located in Grodno on the steep right bank of the Neman. One of the city's surviving masterpieces is the 12th century Orthodox Church of St Boris & St Gleb (Kalozhskaya Church), which is the second oldest in Belarus. There is a museum dedicated to poet Adam Mickiewicz in his childhood home in Novogrudok.

There are about 45 travel agencies in Grodno region, half of them provide agent activity, the other half are tour operators.

== Demographics ==
The province covers an area of 25,100 km^{2} and has a population of 1,065,100, giving a population density of 42/km^{2}. About 63.5% live in cities and towns, while 36.5% live in rural areas. Females account for 53% of the region's population and men 47%. There are about 310,000 children under 19, and about 240,000 people aged 60 or over as of 2025.

Nowadays, Belarusians account for 62.3% of the population. The region is a home to significant minority populations.

Population (1930)

- Poles (60.5%)
- Jews (37.5%)
- Belarusians (0.5%)
- Russians (0.5%)
- Ukrainians (0.2%)
- Lithuanians (0.2%)
- Tatars (0.2%)
- other nationalities (0.2%)

Population (2002)

- Belarusians (62.3%)
- Poles (24.8%)
- Russians (10%)
- Ukrainians (1.8%)
- Jews (0.4%)
- Tatars (0.2%)
- Lithuanians (0.2%)
- other nationalities (0.4%)

Whereas Belarus as a whole is primarily Russian Orthodox, Grodno region has two major religions, Roman Catholic and Russian Orthodox. There are 449 religious communities and 18 denominations, 2 Russian Orthodox eparchial districts, 1 Orthodox nun sorority, 2 Catholic monk brotherhoods, 1 Catholic nun sorority, 2 Orthodox and 4 Catholic monasteries, 165 Orthodox and 169 Catholic churches. The Catholic minority is made up mostly of Poles, although the identifier "Pole" has also been historically applied to Catholic Belarusians.

There are a number on national minority associations: 6 Polish, 6 Lithuanian, 4 Jewish, 1 Ukrainian, 1 Russian, 1 Tatar, 1 Georgian, 1 Chuvash.

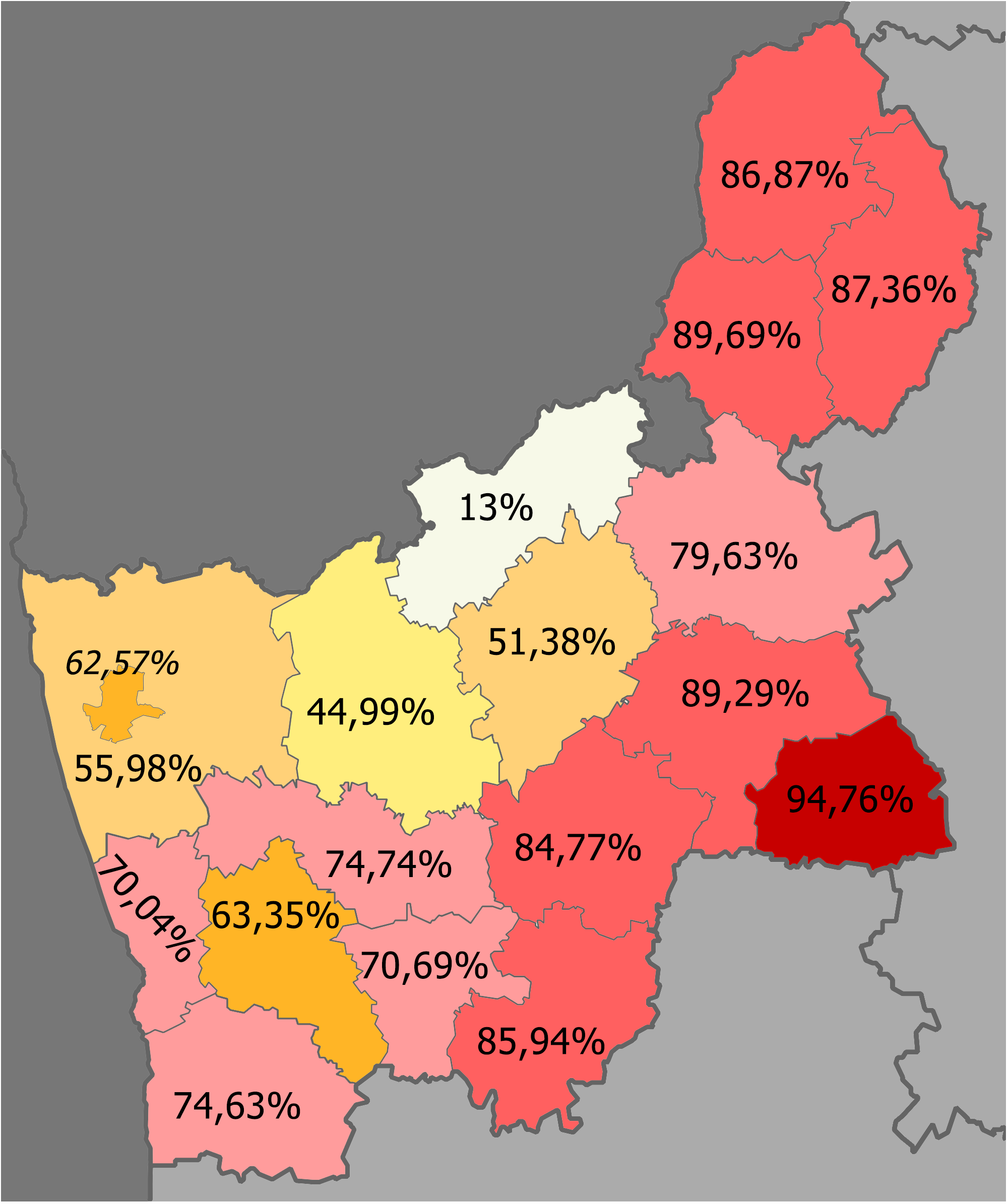
Belarusians in the region
>90%
80–90%
70–80%
60–70%
50–60%
40–50%
<40%

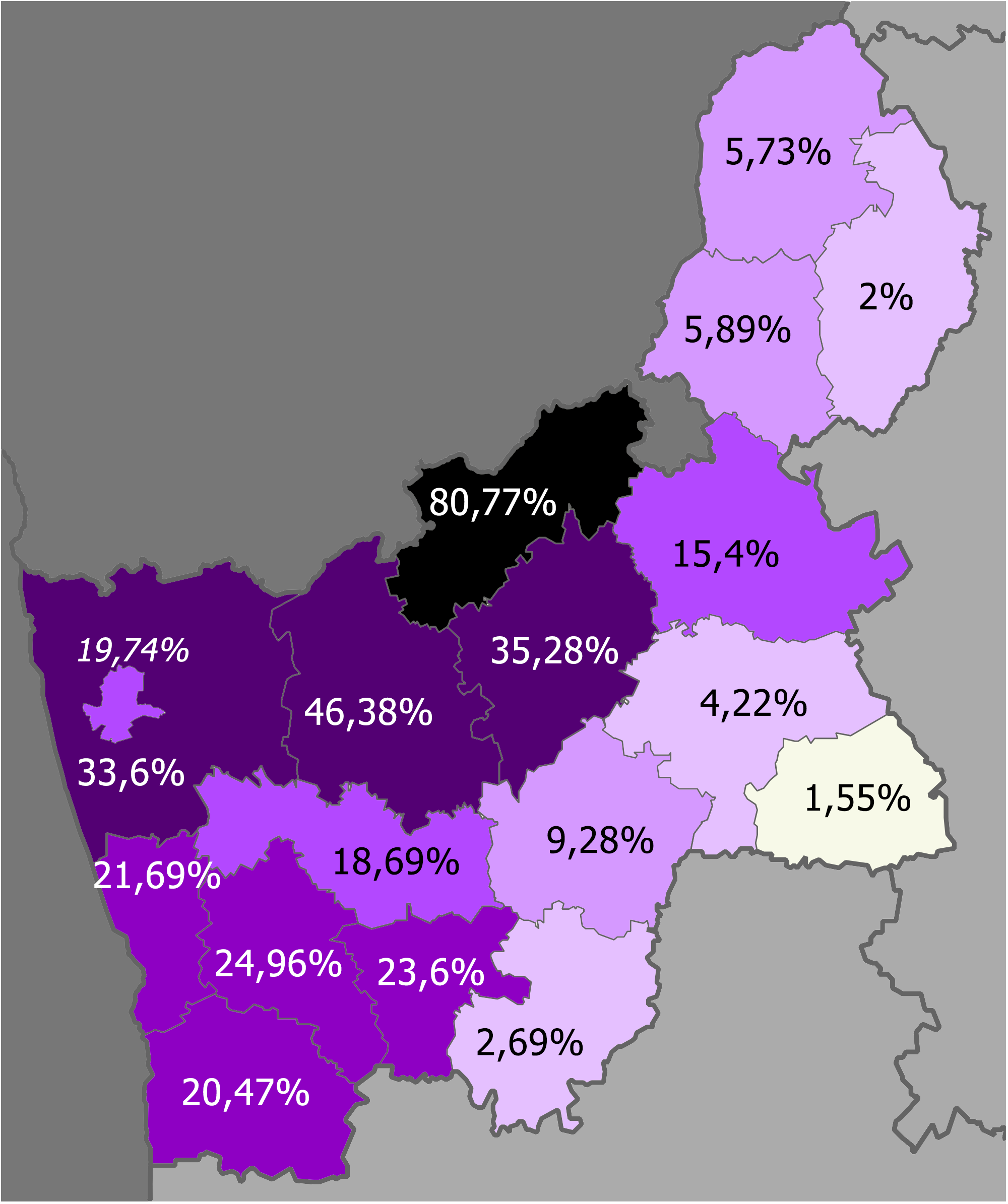
Poles in the region
>50%
30–50%
20–30%
10–20%
5–10%
2–5%
<2%

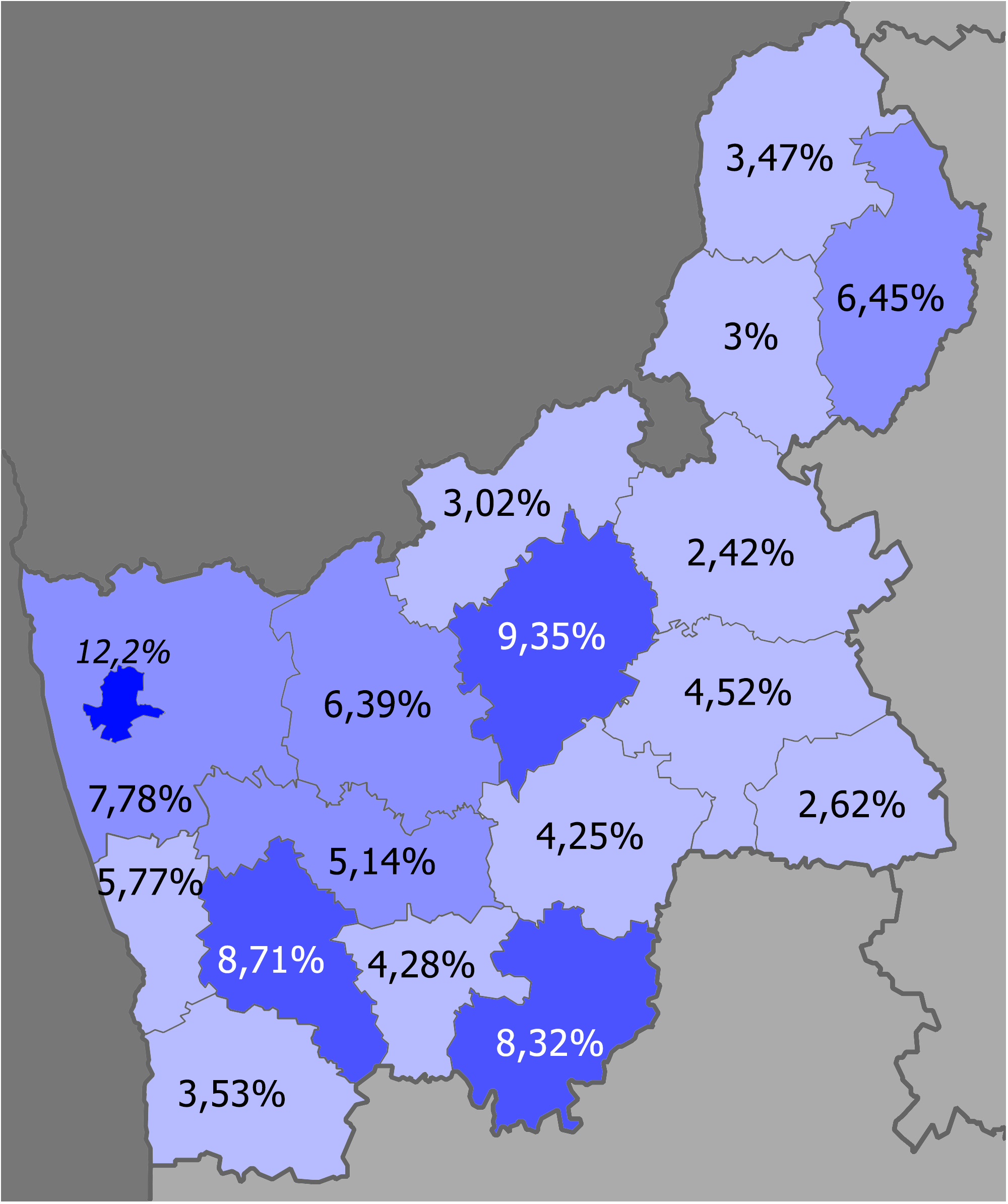
Russians in the region
>10%
8–10%
5–8%
<5%

== Administrative subdivisions ==
Grodno region is subdivided into 17 districts (rajons), 194 selsoviets, 12 cities, 6 city municipalities, and 21 urban-type settlements.

=== Districts of Grodno region ===
- Ashmyany District
- Astravyets District
- Byerastavitsa District
- Dzyatlava District
- Grodno District
- Iwye District
- Karelichy District
- Lida District
- Masty District
- Novogrudok District
- Shchuchyn District
- Slonim District
- Smarhon District
- Svislach District
- Vawkavysk District
- Voranava District
- Zelva District

=== Cities and towns ===
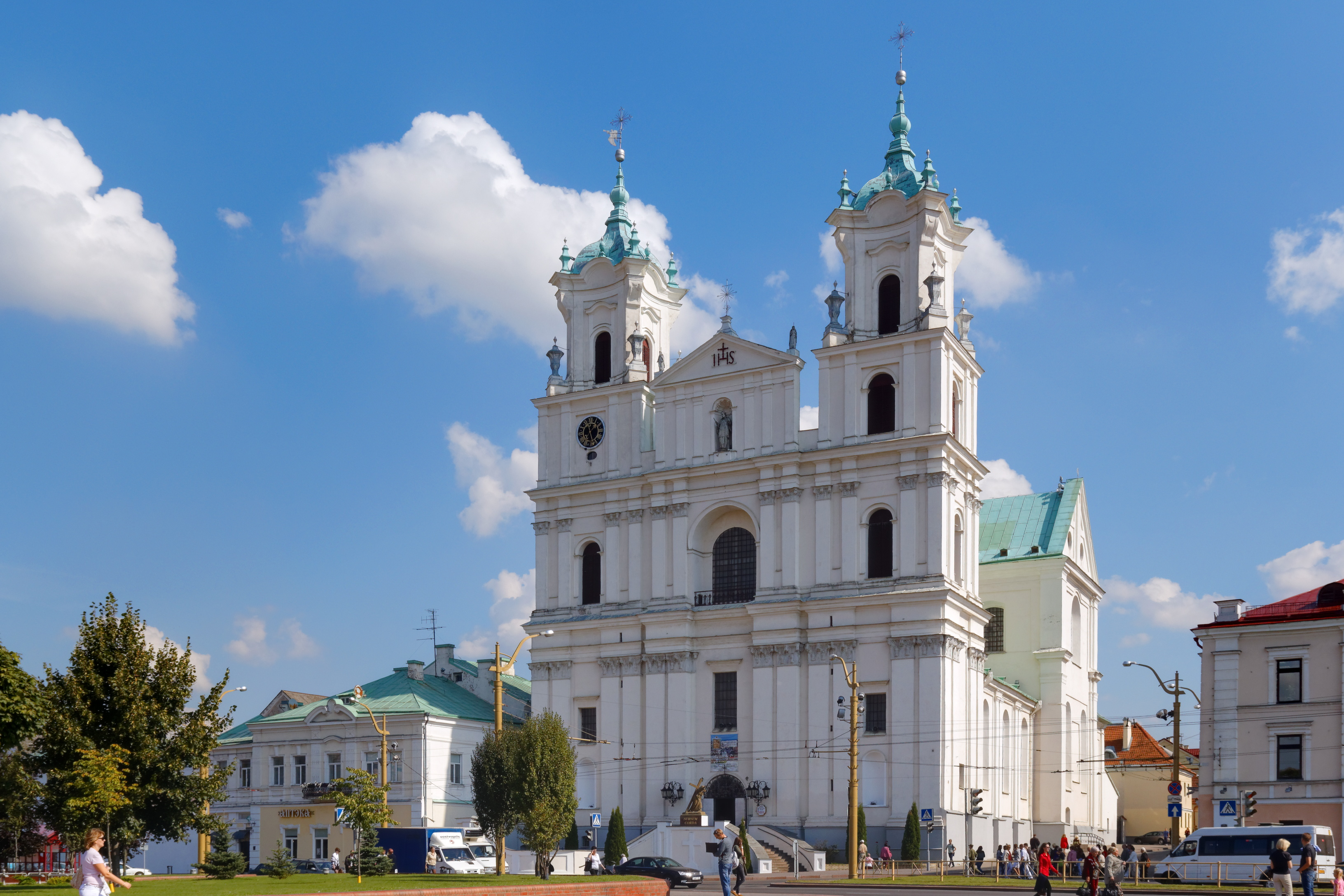
Grodno

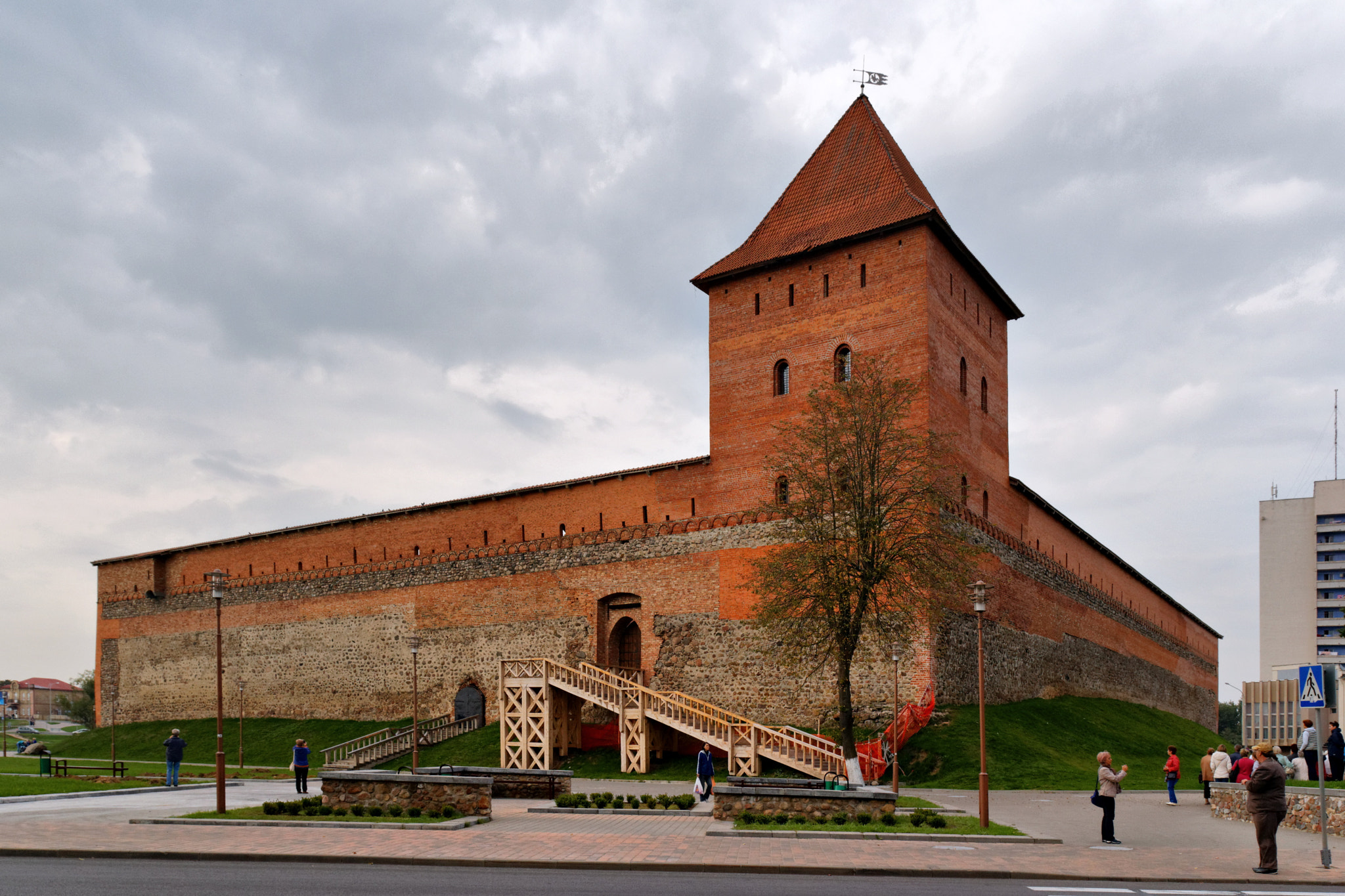
Lida

Population of cities and towns in Grodno region:

English	Belarusian	Pop. (2023)	Pop. (2018)
Grodno	Гродна	358,717	373,547
Lida	Ліда	103,915	101,616
Slonim	Слонім	49,113	49,441
Vawkavysk	Ваўкавыск	41,991	44,004
Smarhon	Смаргонь	35,781	37,527
Novogrudok	Навагрудак	28,021	29,424
Ashmyany	Ашмяны	16,870	16,875
Shchuchyn	Шчучын	15,653	15,475
Masty	Масты	14,683	15,838
Astravyets	Астравец	14,805	10,878
Skidzyelʹ	Скідзель	9,742	10,713
Byarozawka	Бярозаўка	9,657	10,311
Dzyatlava	Дзятлава	7,881	7,624
Iwye	Іўе	7,243	7,702
Svislach	Свiслач	6,098	6,426

== Economy ==
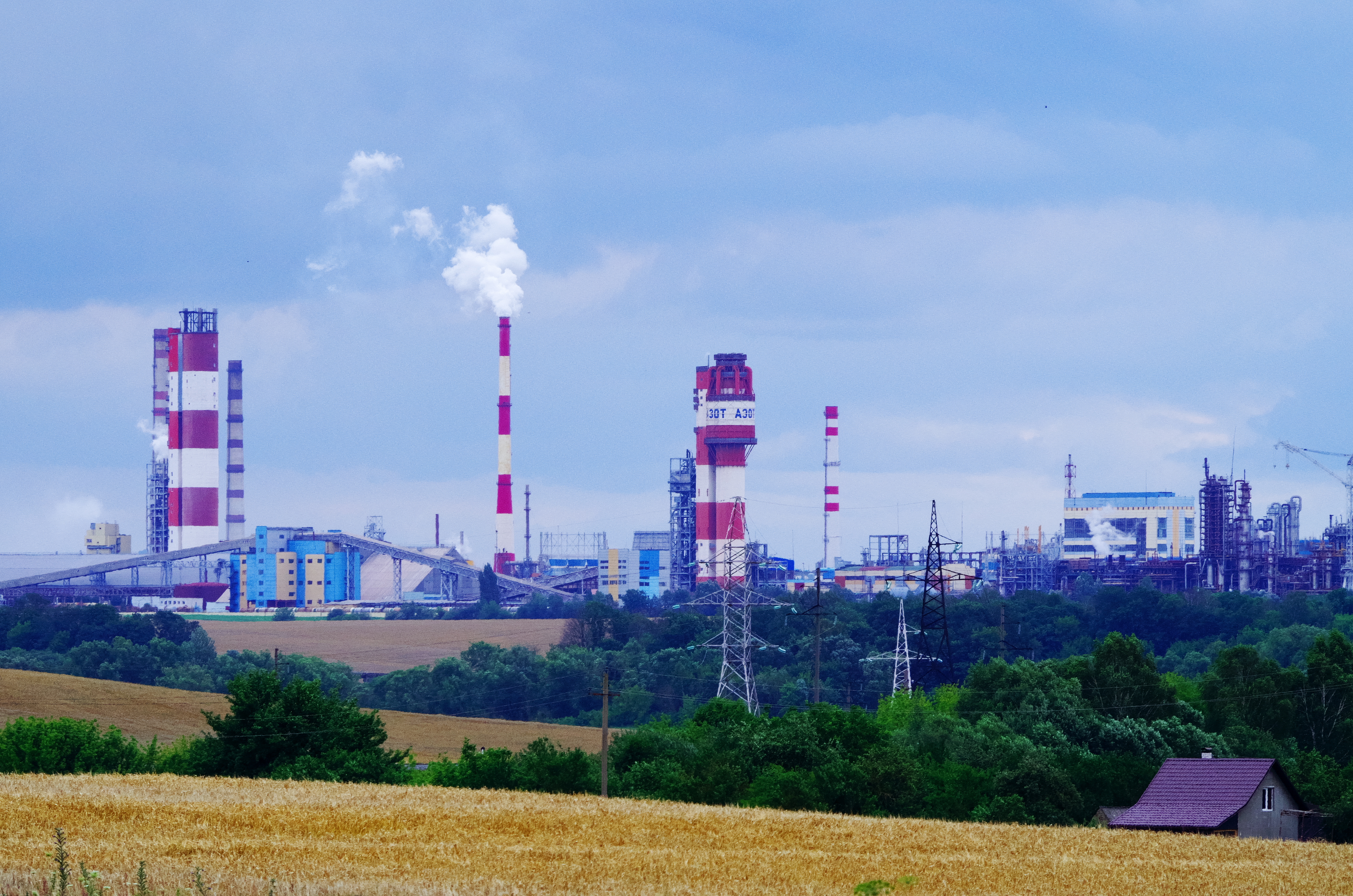
JSC Grodno Azot, the largest industrial company in the region

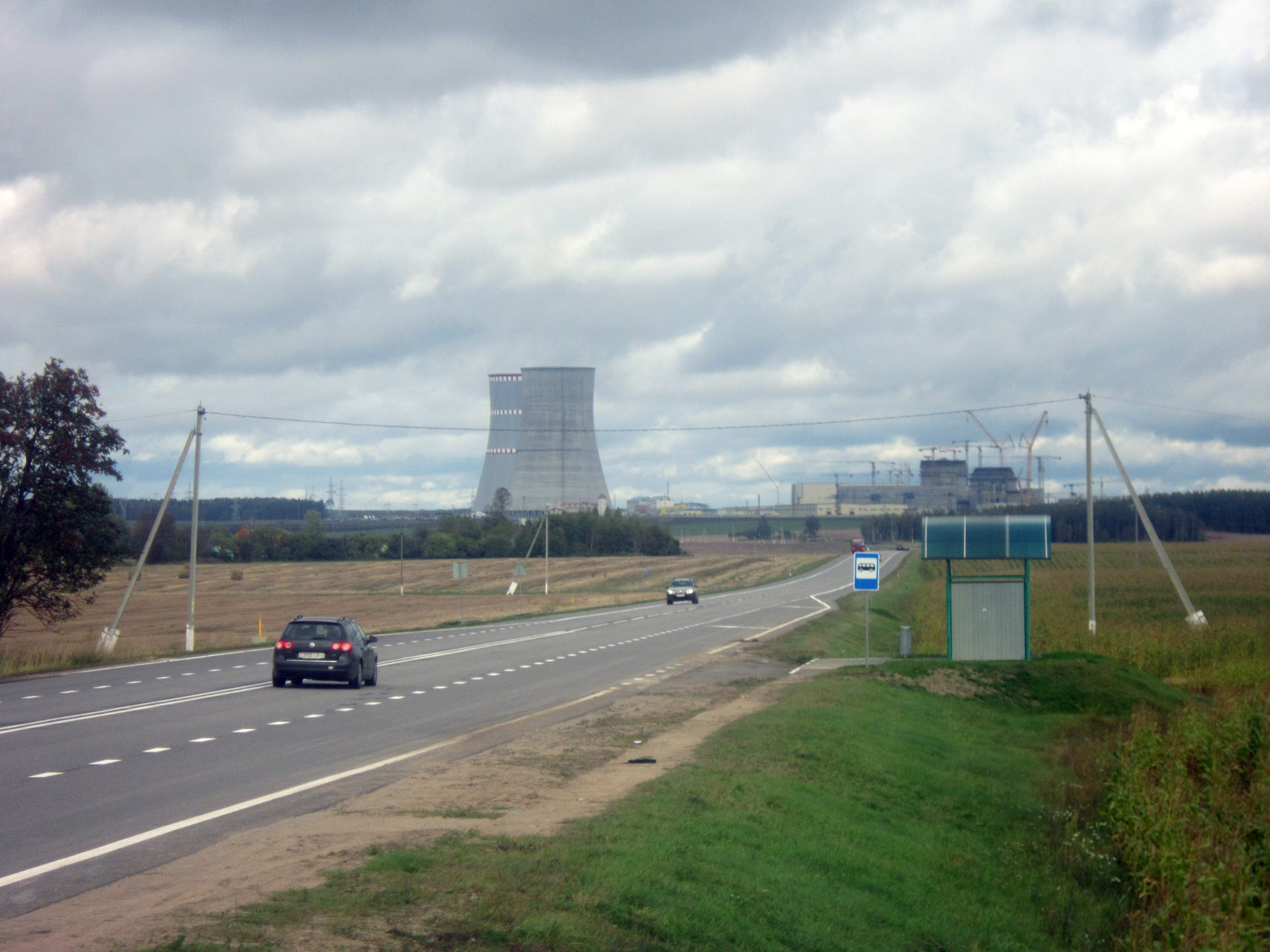
Belarusian nuclear power plant (under construction)

In 2016, Grodno region produced 10.9% of the industrial output of Belarus. The biggest company was a nitrogen fertilizer producer, Grodno Azot (16% of regional industrial output). In 2017, the biggest taxpayer of the region was Grodno tobacco factory.

The average salary (before income tax) in the region in 2017 was 700 BYN, lower than the average salary in Belarus (820 BYN). The highest salary in the region was recorded in Grodno (810 BYN).

The unemployment rate in 2017 was estimated at 4.4%, but only 0.8% of the population of employable age was registered as unemployed.

== See also ==
- Second Polish Republic’s Nowogródek Voivodeship (1919-1939)
- Second Polish Republic’s Białystok Voivodeship (1919–1939)
- Second Polish Republic’s Wilno Voivodeship (1926–39)
