= Hyervyaty =

Agrotown in Grodno Region, Belarus

Hyervyaty Гервяты
- Agrotown
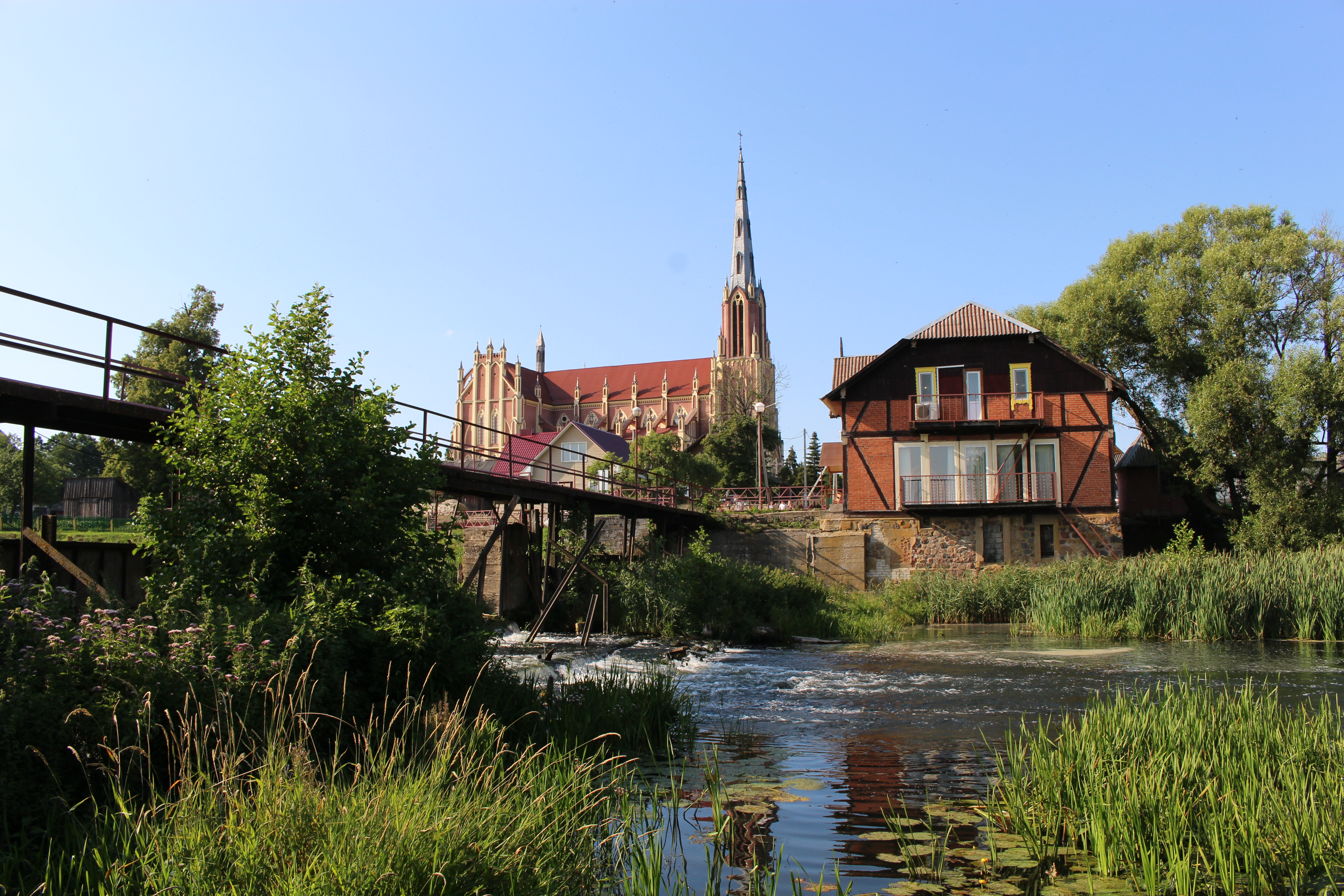

- Location within Belarus
- Coordinates: 54°41′33″N 26°08′28″E
- Country: Belarus
- Region: Grodno Region
- District: Iwye District
- Time zone: UTC+3 (MSK)

Hyervyaty (Belarusian: Гервяты, romanized: Hierviaty; Russian: Гервяты, romanized: Gervyaty; Lithuanian: Gervėčiai) is an agrotown in Astravyets District, Grodno Region, Belarus. It serves as the administrative center of Hyervyaty selsoviet. It is located 24 kilometres (15 mi) from Astravyets and 226 kilometres (140 mi) from Grodno. In 1996, it had a population of 586.

== See also ==
- Church of the Holy Trinity, Hyervyaty
